= List of association football competitions =

This is a list of the association football competitions past and present for international teams and for club football, in individual countries and internationally. Confirmed future competitions are also included.

The competitions are grouped by organising authority: FIFA (international association), the six confederations (continental associations), and the federations (national associations)

== Worldwide and intercontinental competitions ==
Continental confederations

This section lists the worldwide and intercontinental competitions ruled by the FIFA, by two or more confederations or by two or more federations member of different confederations.

=== National Teams ===
==== Worldwide ====
- FIFA World Cup: Final tournament determined by Qualifiers held within the six FIFA continental zones.
- FIFA Women's World Cup: Women's; Final tournament determined by Qualifiers held within the six FIFA continental zones.
- Olympic Football Tournament: Final tournament determined by Qualifiers held within the six FIFA continental zones.

==== Intercontinental ====
- Pan American Games: Under-20
- Finalissima: officially the CONMEBOL–UEFA Cup of Champions (formerly known as European/South American Nations Cup and also called Artemio Franchi Cup); the ceremonial match between winners of Copa America and UEFA European Championship.
- Women's Finalissima: Women's

===== Defunct =====
- FIFA Confederations Cup
- Panamerican Championship
- Afro-Asian Cup of Nations
- AFC/OFC Challenge Cup

==== Invitational tournaments ====
Invitational tournaments are competitions that feature a cup, sometimes holding the name of the host country. The host country invites other nations to participate in the tournament.

- Aisha Buhari Cup: Women's
- Algarve Cup: Women's
- Algeria International Football Tournament
- Aphrodite Women Cup：Women's
- Arnold Clark Cup: Women's
- Balaton Cup： Women's
- Bangabandhu Cup
- Cyprus Women's Cup: Women's
- FIFA Series
- FFA Cup of Nations：Women's
- Flying Officers Cup Women's
- Four Nations Tournament (Zambia)
- Four Nations Tournament: Women's
- Intercontinental Cup (India)
- Istria Cup: Women's
- King's Cup
- Kirin Cup Soccer: Invitational tournament / Kirin Challenge Cup: International friendly match
- Lunar New Year Cup: once known as the Carlsberg Challenge or the Carlsberg Cup.
- Pestabola Merdeka
- Pinatar Cup: Women's
- SheBelieves Cup: Women's
- Sud Ladies Cup：Women's
- Torneio Internacional de Futebol Feminino ： Women's
- Tournoi de France ： Women's
- Tri-Nation Series (India)
- Turkish Women's Cup: Women's
- Unity Cup
- VFF Cup
- Women's Baltic Cup：Women's
- Yongchuan International Tournament: Women's

===== Defunct =====
- Albena Cup： Women's
- Australia Bicentenary Gold Cup
- Balkan Cup
- Brazil Independence Cup
- Canada Cup
- China Cup
- Corsica Football Cup
- Coupe de l'Outre-Mer
- CTFA International Tournament
- Cyprus International Football Tournament
- FA Summer Tournament
- Four Nations Tournament (China)
- Friendship Tournament
- Fuchs International Tournament
- Hassan II Trophy
- Indonesian Independence Cup
- England Challenge Cup
- International Friendship Championship
- Jakarta Anniversary Tournament
- Korea Cup
- Kuneitra Cup
- LG Cup
- Malta women's tournament: Women's
- Marlboro Cup
- Merlion Cup
- Mundialito ： Women's
- Nehru Cup
- Nordic Football Championship
- Peace Queen Cup Women's
- Quaid-e-Azam International Tournament
- Rous Cup
- South Vietnam Independence Cup
- Taça das Nações
- Tournament of Nations: Women's
- Umbro Cup
- Unity Cup
- U.S.A. Bicentennial Cup Tournament
- World Champions' Gold Cup
- World Cup of Masters
- Women's World Invitational Tournament Women's

==== Arab ====
- FIFA Arab Cup
- Arab Games
- Arab Women's Cup: Women's
- Arab Cup U-20: Under-20

===== Defunct =====
- Palestine Cup

==== Muslim ====
- Islamic Solidarity Games

==== Indian Ocean Island ====
- Indian Ocean Island Games

==== National youth teams ====
- FIFA U-20 World Cup: under-20 men; once known as the FIFA World Youth Championship.
- FIFA U-17 World Cup: under-17 men; once known as the FIFA U-16 World Championship or FIFA U-17 World Championship.
- FIFA U-20 Women's World Cup: under-20 women; once known as the FIFA U-19 Women's World Championship.
- FIFA U-17 Women's World Cup: under-17 women
- Summer Universiade
- Danone Nations Cup: between the ages of 10 and 12
- Montaigu Tournament: Under-16
- Panda Cup
- SBS Cup
- SuperCupNI
- Tournoi Maurice Revello: Maurice Revello Tournament; Commonly known as Toulon Tournament

===== Defunct =====
- Youth Olympic Football Tournament
- International Youth Soccer in Niigata: Under-17
- Sendai Cup: Under-19

=== Clubs ===
==== Worldwide ====
- FIFA Club World Cup
- FIFA Intercontinental Cup: beginning in 2024; tournament between the winners of that year's AFC, CAF, CONCACAF, CONMEBOL, OFC and UEFA.

==== Intercontinental ====
- UEFA–CONMEBOL Club Challenge: tournament between the winners of the Copa Sudamericana and the UEFA Europa League
- International Women's Club Championship
- Intercontinental Futsal Cup

===== Defunct =====
- Intercontinental Cup: competition endorsed between UEFA and CONMEBOL; known as Toyota Cup (Note: From 1980 to 2004, when played in Japan, the competition was known as the Toyota European/South American Cup (Japanese: トヨタ ヨーロッパ/サウスアメリカ カップ) due to sponsorship from Toyota. This was often shortened to Toyota Cup (Japanese: トヨタカップ).) from 1980 to 2004.
- Copa Rio: competition between teams of CONMEBOL and UEFA, created by the CBD and endorsed by FIFA in 1951 and changed in 1952.
- Copa Interamericana: between CONCACAF and CONMEBOL
- Afro-Asian Club Championship: between AFC and CAF
- Intercontinental Champions' Supercup: contested by the past winners of the Intercontinental Cup
- Supercopa Euroamericana: until 2016; friendly tournament between the winners of the Copa Sudamericana and the UEFA Europa League

==== Pre-season friendly / invitational tournaments ====
- ANFA Cup
- Audi Cup
- BTV Cup
- Coupang Play Series
- Emirates Cup
- Eusébio Cup
- Florida Cup
- Friendship Trophy
- Geoff Harvey Memorial Vase: 4-team tournament presented by Corinthian-Casuals F.C.
- HKFC Soccer Sevens
- J.League Asia Challenge
- J.League World Challenge
- Lunar New Year Cup
- Maradona Cup: scheduled to start in 2021
- MLS All-Star Game
- Orange Trophy
- Premier League Summer Series
- Ramón de Carranza Trophy
- Riyadh Season Cup
- Saitama City Cup
- Soccer Champions Tour
- Sydney Super Cup
- Telekom Cup: Originally, only Bundesliga teams participated.
- Teresa Herrera Trophy
- The Atlantic Cup
- The Women's Cup: Women's
- Torneo di Viareggio
- Trofeo Colombino
- Trofeo Costa del Sol
- Trofeo Joan Gamper
- Trofeo Santiago Bernabéu
- Uhrencup
- Women's International Champions Cup: Women's

===== Defunct =====
- Amsterdam Tournament
- Copa del Sol: 2010–2014
- Copa Euro-América
- Dubai Cup
- Edmonton Cup
- Football World Championship
- Global Tour for Peace
- International Champions Cup
- La Manga Cup: winter tournament 1999–2015; Usual between clubs from countries with a summer football season (Sweden, Finland, Denmark, Norway, Russia, Ukraine, United States and Canada)
- Marbella Cup: 2004–2017
- Mohammed V Cup
- Opel Master Cup
- Pan-Pacific Championship
- Peace Cup
- Premier League Asia Trophy
- Russian Railways Cup
- Queen's Cup
- Small Club World Cup
- Tournoi de Paris
- Uli Hoeneß Cup
- Vodacom Challenge
- Wembley Cup
- Wembley International Tournament
- World Football Challenge

==== Arab ====
- Arab Club Champions Cup

===== Defunct =====
- Arab Cup Winners' Cup
- Arab Super Cup

==== Japanese-South American ====
===== Defunct =====
- J.League Cup / Copa Sudamericana Championship: previously officially called the Suruga Bank Championship (Note: between 2008 and 2018 due to Sponsorship reasons.).

==== Saudi-Egyptian ====
- Lusail Super Cup

===== Defunct =====
- Saudi-Egyptian Super Cup

==== Youth teams ====
- Alkass International Cup: Under-17
- Balcom BMW CUP Prayer for Peace; Hiroshima International Youth Soccer Games
- Dallas Cup
- Gothia Cup
- J.League International Youth Cup
- K League International Youth Cup; from the 2023 season
- Manchester United Premier Cup
- Montaigu Tournament: Under-16
- Otten Cup
- Torneo di Viareggio

== AFC (Asian competitions) ==
This section lists the competitions ruled by the AFC (Asian Football Confederation), or by federations member the AFC.

=== National teams ===
==== AFC competitions ====
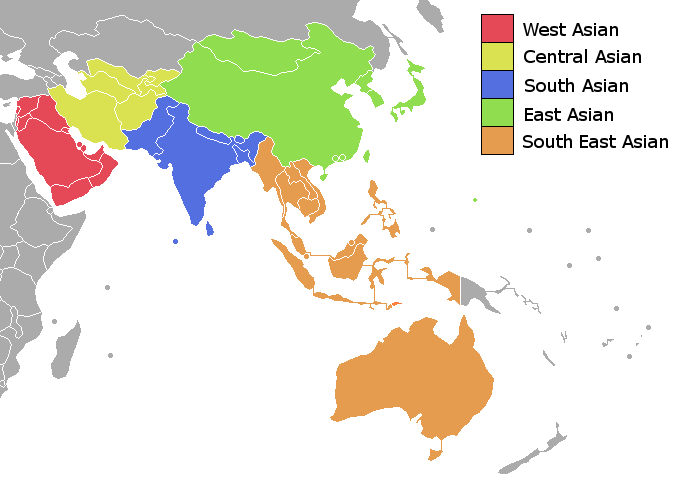
Federations member the Asian Football Confederation

- AFC Asian Cup: Qualification is linked with AFC Asian Qualifiers for the FIFA World Cup.
- AFC Nations League: Upcoming competition.
- AFC U23 Asian Cup: Linked with Qualifiers for the Men's Olympic Football Tournament; once known as the AFC U-22 Championship or AFC U-23 Championship
- AFC U20 Asian Cup: once known as the AFC Youth Championship or AFC U-19 Championship
- AFC U17 Asian Cup: once known as the AFC U-16 Championship or AFC U-17 Championship
- AFC Women's Asian Cup: Women's cup; Linked with Qualifiers for the FIFA Women's World Cup.
- AFC Women's Olympic Qualifying Tournament: Women's
- AFC U20 Women's Asian Cup: Women's
- AFC U17 Women's Asian Cup: Women's
- Asian Games

===== Defunct =====
- AFC Solidarity Cup
- AFC Challenge Cup

==== Sub-federation competitions ====
- ASEAN Championship: formerly known as the AFF Championship or AFF Cup
- FIFA ASEAN Cup: 1st-tier ; For the men's national football teams of Southeast Asia.
- FIFA ASEAN Challenge Cup: 2nd-tier ; For the men's national football teams of Southeast Asia.
- CAFA Nations Cup
- EAFF E-1 Football Championship (men) / (women): once known as the Dynasty Cup , East Asian Football Championship or EAFF East Asian Cup
- SAFF Championship
- WAFF Championship
- AFF–EAFF Champions Trophy: Not yet held
- Arabian Gulf Cup: Hosted by the GFF
- Gulf Cup for Veteran Players: Hosted by the GFF
- East Asian Youth Games
- South Asian Games
- Southeast Asian Games
- West Asian Games

===== Defunct =====
- East Asian Games
- Three Nations Cup: Hosted by the KFU
- Three Nations Cup: Hosted by the ANFA

=== Clubs ===
==== AFC competitions ====
- AFC Champions League Elite: 1st-tier cup; once known as AFC Champions League, Asian Club Championship or Asian Champion Club Tournament
- AFC Champions League Two: 2nd-tier cup; once known as AFC Cup
- AFC Challenge League: 3rd-tier cup; once known as AFC President's Cup
- AFC Women's Champions League: Women's

===== Defunct =====
- Asian Cup Winners' Cup
- Asian Super Cup
- Afro-Asian Club Championship
- AFC Women's Club Championship

==== Sub-federation competitions ====
- ASEAN Club Championship
- GFF Gulf Club Champions League: Hosted by the GFF
- GFF Gulf Club Super Cup: Hosted by the GFF
- Sheikh Kamal International Club Cup
- Marianas Club Championship
- SAFF Club Championship
- WAFF Women's Clubs Championship: Women's
- SAFF Women's Club Championship: Women's

===== Defunct =====
- ASEAN Champions' Cup
- A3 Champions Cup
- Mekong Club Championship

==== UAE-Qatar ====
The UAE–Qatar Super Cup Series (Super Cup, Super Shield, Challenge Cup, Challenge Shield) is a set of annual football competitions contested by top professional club teams from the UAE and Qatar.

=== Domestic ===
==== Afghanistan ====
(Afghanistan)	Competitions	League/Cup	Notes
^{[Sen.Men]} ^{[L]}	Afghanistan Champions League	1st-tier league	Started in 2021; Each year; Each team plays every other team once
^{[Sen.Men]} ^{[L]}	Afghan Premier League	1st-tier league	Held between 2012 and 2020; Each year; Each team plays every other team once
^{[Sen.Men]} ^{[L]}	Kabul Premier League	1st-tier league	Each team plays every other team once
^{[Sen.Men]} ^{[L]}	Kabul City League
^{[Sen.Men]} ^{[Cup]}	Afghanistan Republic Day Festival Cup	Conmemorative Cup	Held during 1970's
^{[Sen.Women]} ^{[L]}	Women Kabul League	1st-tier league

==== Australia ====
(Australia)	Competitions	League/Cup
^{[Sen.Men]} ^{[L]}	A-League Men	1st-tier league	Until 2020–21 season, known as A-League. Each year (October→April); Each team plays every other team three times; Playoffs (May→June). Also includes two team from New Zealand.
^{[Sen.Men]} ^{[L]}	National Premier Leagues	2nd-tier league	Includes the post-season Australian Championship competition
^{[Sen.Men]} ^{[Cup]}	Australia Cup	National cup	Each year (February→October)
^{[Sen.Women]} ^{[L]}	A-League Women	Women's 1st-tier league	Until 2020–21 season, known as W-League. Each year (November→February); Playoffs (March).
^{[Youth_Men]} ^{[L]}	A-League Youth	Youth (U-21) league	Defunct:2008→2020, known as the Y-League
^{[Sen.Men]} ^{[L]}	National Soccer League	National league	Defunct: 1977→2004, each year
^{[Sen.Men]} ^{[Cup]}	NSL Cup	National cup	Defunct: 1977→1997, each year
^{[Futsal]} ^{[L]}	F-League	1st-tier futsal league	Defunct: 2011→2016; Professional and Semi-Professional Futsal Clubs
Australian Capital Territory
^{[Sen.Men]} ^{[L]}	National Premier Leagues Capital Football	2nd-tier league	Each year (April→September); Each team plays every other team twice; Playoffs (September)
^{[Sen.Men]} ^{[L]}	Capital Premier League	(Defunct 2nd-tier league)	Each year (April→September); Each team plays every other team three times; Playoffs (September)
^{[Sen.Men]} ^{[L]}	Capital Football State League 1	3rd-tier league	Each year (April→September); Each team plays every other team twice; Playoffs (September)
^{[Sen.Men]} ^{[Cup]}	Capital Football Federation Cup	State cup	Each year (February→July)
^{[Futsal]} ^{[L]}	A.C.T Futsal Premier League	1st-tier futsal league	Professional and Semi-Professional Futsal Clubs
^{[Sen.Women]} ^{[L]}	National Premier Leagues ACT Women's	Women's 2nd-tier league	Each year (March→September) since 2017.
New South Wales
^{[Sen.Men]} ^{[L]}	National Premier Leagues NSW	2nd-tier league	Each year (February→July); Each team plays every other team twice; Playoffs (July→August)
^{[Sen.Men]} ^{[L]}	NSW League One	3rd-tier league	Each year (March→August); Each team plays every other team twice; Playoffs (September)
^{[Sen.Men]} ^{[L]}	NSW League Two	4th-tier league	Each year (March→August); Each team plays every other team twice; Playoffs (August→September)
^{[Sen.Men]} ^{[L]}	New South Wales Regional Leagues	5th-tier league
^{[Sen.Men]} ^{[L]}	NSW League Three	(Defunct league)	Each year (March→August); Each team plays every other team twice; Playoffs
^{[Sen.Men]} ^{[Cup]}	Waratah Cup	State cup	Each year (February→July)
^{[Sen.Women]} ^{[L]}	National Premier Leagues NSW Women's	Women's 2nd-tier league	Each year (March→September) since 2014.
^{[Sen.Women]} ^{[L]}	NSW League One Women's	Women's 3rd-tier league	Each year (March→September).
Northern New South Wales
^{[Sen.Men]} ^{[L]}	National Premier Leagues Northern NSW	2nd-tier league	Each year (April→August); Each team plays every other team twice; Playoffs (August→September)
^{[Sen.Men]} ^{[L]}	Northern NSW State League Division 1	3rd-tier league	Each year (March→August); Each team plays every other team twice; Playoffs (August→September)
Northern Territory
^{[Sen.Men]} ^{[L]}	NorZone Premier League	2nd-tier league	Each year (April→September); Each team plays every other team three times; Playoffs (September)
^{[Sen.Men]} ^{[Cup]}	NT Australia Cup	State cup
Queensland
^{[Sen.Men]} ^{[L]}	National Premier Leagues Queensland	2nd-tier league	Each year (March→August); Each team plays every other team twice; Playoffs (August)
^{[Sen.Men]} ^{[L]}	Football Queensland Premier League	3rd-tier league	Each year (March→August); Each team plays every other team twice; Playoffs (August)
^{[Sen.Men]} ^{[L]}	Football Queensland Premier League 2	4th-tier league	Each year (March→August); Each team plays every other team twice; Playoffs (August)
^{[Sen.Women]} ^{[L]}	National Premier Leagues Queensland Women's	Women's 2nd-tier league	Each year (March→September) since 2015.
Brisbane
^{[Sen.Men]} ^{[L]}	Football Queensland Premier League 3 − Metro	5th-tier league	Each year (March→September); Each team plays every other team twice; Playoffs (September)
^{[Sen.Men]} ^{[L]}	Football Queensland Premier League 4 − Metro	6th-tier league	Each year (March→September); Each team plays every other team twice; Playoffs (September)
^{[Sen.Men]} ^{[L]}	Football Queensland Premier League 5 − Metro	7th-tier league	Each year (March→September); Each team plays every other team twice; Playoffs (September)
^{[Sen.Men]} ^{[L]}	Football Queensland Premier League 6 − Metro	8th-tier league	Each year (March→September); Each team plays every other team twice; Playoffs (September)
^{[Sen.Men]} ^{[Cup]}	Canale Cup	Regional cup	Each year (February→July)
Far North Queensland
^{[Sen.Men]} ^{[L]}	Far North Queensland Premier League	5th-tier league	Each year (April→September); Each team plays every other team three times; Playoffs (September)
Gold Coast
^{[Sen.Men]} ^{[L]}	Football Queensland Premier League 3 − South Coast	5th-tier league	Each year (March→August); Each team plays every other team three times; Playoffs (September)
^{[Sen.Men]} ^{[L]}	Football Queensland Premier League 4 − South Coast	6th-tier league	Each year (March→August); Each team plays every other team three times; Playoffs (September)
Sunshine Coast
^{[Sen.Men]} ^{[L]}	Football Queensland Premier League 3 – Sunshine Coast	5th-tier league	Each year (March→August); Each team plays every other team twice; Playoffs (September)
South Australia
^{[Sen.Men]} ^{[L]}	National Premier Leagues South Australia	2nd-tier league	Each year (March→September); Each team plays every other team twice
^{[Sen.Men]} ^{[L]}	SA State League One	3rd-tier league	Each year (February/March→September); Each team plays every other team twice
^{[Sen.Men]} ^{[L]}	SA State League Two	4th-tier league	Each year (February/March→September); Each team plays every other team twice
^{[Sen.Men]} ^{[Cup]}	Federation Cup	State cups	Each year (March→July); Includes various amateur teams
^{[Sen.Women]} ^{[L]}	Women's National Premier Leagues South Australia	Women's 2nd-tier league	Each year (February/March→September); Each team plays each other team twice
^{[Sen.Women]} ^{[L]}	Women's State League South Australia	Women's 3rd-tier league	Each year (February/March→September); Each team plays each other team twice
Tasmania
^{[Sen.Men]} ^{[L]}	National Premier Leagues Tasmania	2nd-tier league	1977–2004, each year
^{[Sen.Men]} ^{[Cup]}	Milan Lakoseljac Cup	State cup	One of several state cups organized each year
^{[Sen.Men]} ^{[L]}	Northern Championship	3rd-tier league	Northern Tasmania: Each year (March→August); Each team plays every other team twice
^{[Sen.Men]} ^{[L]}	Southern Championship	3rd-tier league	Southern Tasmania: Each year (March→August); Each team plays every other team twice; Playoffs (September)
Victoria
^{[Sen.Men]} ^{[L]}	National Premier Leagues Victoria	2nd-tier league	Each year (March→September); Each team plays every other team twice; Playoffs (September→October)
^{[Sen.Men]} ^{[L]}	Victorian Premier League 1	3rd-tier league	Each year (April→September); Each team plays every other team twice
^{[Sen.Men]} ^{[L]}	Victorian Premier League 2	4th-tier league	Each year (April→September); Each team plays every other team twice
^{[Sen.Men]} ^{[L]}	Victorian State League 1	5th-tier league	Each year (April→September); Each team plays every other team twice; 2 groups: North West and South East
^{[Sen.Men]} ^{[Cup]}	Dockerty Cup	State cup	1909–1996, 2004, annually thereafter.
^{[Sen.Women]} ^{[L]}	National Premier Leagues Victoria Women	Women's 2nd-tier league	Each year (March→September) since 2016.
Western Australia
^{[Sen.Men]} ^{[L]}	National Premier Leagues Western Australia	2nd-tier league	Each year (April→September); Each team plays every other team twice
^{[Sen.Men]} ^{[L]}	Football West State League Division 1	3rd-tier league	Each year (April→September); Each team plays every other team twice
^{[Sen.Men]} ^{[L]}	Football West State League Division 2	4th-tier league	Each year (April→September); Each team plays every other team twice
^{[Sen.Men]} ^{[Cup]}	Football West State Cup	State cup	Each year (February→July)
^{[Sen.Women]} ^{[L]}	National Premier Leagues WA Women	Women's 2nd-tier league	Each year (March→September) since 2021.

==== Bahrain ====
(Bahrain)	Competitions	League/Cup
^{[Sen.Men]} ^{[L]}	Bahraini Premier League	1st -tier league	Each year; Each team plays every other team twice
^{[Sen.Men]} ^{[L]}	Bahraini Second Division	2nd-tier league
^{[Sen.Men]} ^{[Cup]}	Bahraini King's Cup	National Cup
^{[Sen.Men]} ^{[Cup]}	Bahraini FA Cup	FA Cup
^{[Sen.Men]} ^{[Cup]}	Bahraini Crown Prince Cup	Knock-out Cup
^{[Sen.Men]} ^{[Cup]}	Bahraini Super Cup	Super Cup
^{[Sen.Men]} ^{[Cup]}	Bahraini Elite Cup	Cup defunct	Cup competition by top six teams held in 2018 and 2019; the top six teams will be the clubs ranked 1–5 in the Bahraini Premier League and the Bahraini King's Cup winners.

==== Bangladesh ====
(Bangladesh)	Competitions	League/Cup
^{[Sen.Men]} ^{[L]}	Bangladesh Football League	National pro league	Each year; Each team plays every other team twice
^{[Sen.Men]} ^{[L]}	Bangladesh Championship League	2nd-tier Professional Football League	Each year; Each team plays every other team twice
^{[Sen.Men]} ^{[L]}	Dhaka Senior Division Football League	3rd-tier Semi-Professional Football League	Each year; Each team plays every other team twice
^{[Sen.Men]} ^{[L]}	Dhaka Second Division Football League	4th-tier Semi-Professional Football League	Each year; Includes two phases
^{[Sen.Men]} ^{[L]}	Dhaka Third Division Football League	5th-tier Semi-Professional Football League	Each year; Includes two phases
^{[Sen.Men]} ^{[L]}	Pioneer Football League	6th-tier Youth Football League	Each year; Includes two phases
^{[Sen.Men]} ^{[Cup]}	Independence Cup	National cup	Each year; Teams from Bangladesh Premier League (football) participate in this competition from group stage
^{[Sen.Men]} ^{[Cup]}	Federation Cup	National cup	Each year; Teams from Bangladesh Premier League (football)& Bangladesh Championship League participate in this competition from group stage
^{[Sen.Men]} ^{[Cup]}	Super Cup	Super cup	Each year; Non relegated teams in Bangladesh Premier League (football) participate in this competition from group stage
^{[Sen.Men]} ^{[Cup]}	Aga Khan Gold Cup	International cup	discontinued after 1981 and replaced by the President's Gold Cup
^{[Sen.Men]} ^{[Cup]}	President Gold Cup	International cup	This tournament succeeded the Aga Khan Gold Cup until 1993
^{[Sen.Men]} ^{[Cup]}	Bangabandhu Cup	International cup	re-launch tournament in the 2015
^{[Sen.Women]} ^{[L]}	Bangladesh Women's Football League	National pro league	Each year; Each team plays every other team twice

==== Bhutan ====
(Bhutan)	Competitions	League/Cup
^{[Sen.Men]} ^{[L]}	Bhutan Premier League	1st-tier
^{[Sen.Men]} ^{[L]}	Bhutan Super League	2nd-tier
^{[Sen.Men]} ^{[L]}	Dzongkhag	3rd-tier	District League
^{[Sen.Men]} ^{[Cup]}	Jigme Dorji Wangchuk Memorial Gold Cup	National cup

==== Brunei ====
(Brunei)	Competitions	League/Cup
^{[Sen.Men]} ^{[L]}	Brunei Super League	1st-tier
^{[Sen.Men]} ^{[L]}	District leagues	2nd-tier
^{[Sen.Men]} ^{[L]}	Brunei Premier League	1st-tier, defunct
^{[Sen.Men]} ^{[Cup]}	Brunei FA Cup	National cup
^{[Sen.Men]} ^{[Cup]}	Brunei Super Cup	Super cup
^{[Sen.Men]} ^{[Cup]}	Borneo Cup	defunct

==== Cambodia ====
(Cambodia)	Competitions	League/Cup
^{[Sen.Men]} ^{[L]}	Cambodian Premier League	1st-tier
^{[Sen.Men]} ^{[L]}	Cambodian League 2	2nd-tier
^{[Sen.Men]} ^{[Cup]}	Hun Sen Cup	National cup
^{[Sen.Men]} ^{[Cup]}	CNCC Charity Cup	Super cup
^{[Sen.Men]} ^{[Cup]}	CNCC League Cup	League Cup
^{[Sen.Men]} ^{[Cup]}	FFC Cup
^{[Sen.Men]} ^{[Cup]}	FFC Challenge Cup

==== China PR ====
(mainland China)	Competitions	League/Cup
^{[Sen.Men]} ^{[L]}	Chinese Super League	1st-tier league
^{[Sen.Men]} ^{[L]}	China League One	2nd-tier league
^{[Sen.Men]} ^{[L]}	China League Two	3rd-tier league
^{[Sen.Men]} ^{[L]}	Chinese Champions League	4th-tier league
^{[Sen.Men]} ^{[L]}	Member Football Association leagues	5th-tier & below leagues	Regional
^{[Sen.Men]} ^{[Cup]}	CFA Cup	National cup
^{[Sen.Men]} ^{[Cup]}	CFA Super Cup	Super cup	Between winners of Chinese Super League and CFA Cup
^{[Sen.Men]} ^{[Cup]}	Chinese Super League Cup	(Defunct cup)
^{[Sen.Men]} ^{[Cup]}	Guangdong–Hong Kong Cup	Sub-continental cup
^{[Sen.Men]} ^{[Cup]}	Jingjinji Champions Cup	(Defunct cup)
^{[Sen.Men]} ^{[Cup]}	Hong Kong–Shanghai Inter Club Championship	(Defunct cup)
^{[Sen.Women]} ^{[L]}	Chinese Women's Super League	Women's 1st-tier league
^{[Sen.Women]} ^{[L]}	Chinese Women's Football League	Women's 2nd-tier league

==== Guam ====
===== Leagues =====
- Guam Soccer League: 1st-tier
  - Division 1
  - Division 2

===== Cups =====
- Guam FA Cup: National cup

==== Hong Kong ====
===== Leagues =====
- ^{[Sen.Men]} ^{[L]} Hong Kong Premier League: 1st-tier
- ^{[Sen.Men]} ^{[L]} First Division: 2nd-tier
- ^{[Sen.Men]} ^{[L]} Second Division: 3rd-tier
- ^{[Sen.Men]} ^{[L]} Third Division: 4th-tier

===== Cups =====
- ^{[Sen.Men]} ^{[Cup]} Hong Kong Community Cup: Super cup
- ^{[Sen.Men]} ^{[Cup]} Hong Kong FA Cup: National cup
- ^{[Sen.Men]} ^{[Cup]} Hong Kong FA Cup Junior Division: Lower cup
- ^{[Sen.Men]} ^{[Cup]} Senior Shield: National cup
- ^{[Sen.Men]} ^{[Cup]} Sapling Cup: League cup
- ^{[Sen.Men]} ^{[Cup]} Viceroy Cup: defunct
- ^{[Sen.Men]} ^{[Cup]} Hong Kong League Cup: defunct

==== India ====
(India)	Competitions	League/Cup
All India Football Federation
^{[Sen.Men]} ^{[L]}	Indian Super League	1st-tier
^{[Sen.Men]} ^{[L]}	I-League	2nd-tier	(started as National Football League)
^{[Sen.Men]} ^{[L]}	I-League 2	3rd-tier
^{[Sen.Men]} ^{[L]}	I-League 3	4th-tier
^{[Sen.Men]} ^{[Cup]}	AIFF Super Cup	National cup	(Previously as Federation Cup)
^{[Sen.Men]} ^{[Cup]}	Durand Cup
^{[Sen.Men]} ^{[Cup]}	IFA Shield
^{[Sen.Men]} ^{[Cup]}	Rovers Cup	defunct
^{[Sen.Men]} ^{[Cup]}	Indian Super Cup	Super Cup	defunct
^{[Youth_Men]} ^{[L]}	Elite League
^{[Youth_Men]} ^{[L]}	Youth League: U18
^{[Youth_Men]} ^{[L]}	Juniors League: U15
^{[Youth_Men]} ^{[L]}	Sub-Juniors League: U13
^{[Futsal]} ^{[L]}	Futsal Club Championship
International domestic competition
^{[Sen.Men]} ^{[National]}	Intercontinental Cup
^{[Sen.Men]} ^{[National]}	Nehru Cup		defunct

===== Inter-state national competition =====
- Santosh Trophy

===== State Leagues =====
Indian State Leagues

===== Regional Leagues =====
Region/State	League
Assam	Assam State Premier League
Arunachal Pradesh	Indrajit Namchoom Arunachal League
Delhi	Delhi Football League
Goa	Goa Professional League
Himachal Pradesh	Himachal Football League
Jammu and Kashmir	J&K Premier Football League
Karnataka	Bangalore Football League
Kerala	Kerala Premier League
Madhya Pradesh	Madhya Pradesh Premier League
Maharashtra	Mumbai Football League
Manipur	Manipur State League
Meghalaya	Shillong Premier League
Mizoram	Mizoram Premier League
Nagaland	Nagaland Premier League
Odisha	FAO League
Punjab	Punjab State Super Football League
Rajasthan	R-League A Division
Tamil Nadu	Chennai Football League
Uttarakhand	Uttarakhand Super League
West Bengal	Calcutta Football League

===== Leagues =====
- ^{[Sen.Women]} ^{[National]} Indian Women's League 1st-tier
- ^{[Sen.Women]} ^{[National]} Indian Women's League 2 2nd-tier

===== Inter-state national competition =====
- Indian Women's National Championship

===== State Leagues =====
Indian State Leagues

===== Regional Leagues =====
Region/State	League
Delhi	FD Women's League
Goa	Goa Women's League
Karnataka	Karnataka Women's League
Kerala	Kerala Women's League
Maharashtra	WIFA Women's Football League
Manipur	Manipur Women's League
Meghalaya	SSA Women's Football League
Odisha	Odisha Women's League
Punjab	Punjab Women's League
Tamil Nadu	Tamil Nadu Women's League
West Bengal	Calcutta Women's Football League

==== Indonesia ====
(Indonesia) Competitions	League/Cup
Super League	1st-tier league
Championship	2nd-tier league
Liga Nusantara	3rd-tier league
Liga 4	4th-tier league
Elite Pro Academy	Youth league
Piala Indonesia	National cup
Piala Liga	League cup
Community Shield Indonesia	Super Cup
Piala Presiden	Special Tournament
Soeratin Cup	Youth cup
Indonesia Women's League	Woman's league
Pertiwi Cup	Women's cup

==== Iran ====
(Iran) Competitions	League/Cup
Persian Gulf Pro League	1st-tier league	Premier League
Azadegan League	2nd-tier league	League 1, Iran Football's 1st Division
League 2	3rd-tier league	Iran Football's 2nd Division
League 3	4th/5th-tier leagues	Iran Football's 3rd Division
Provincial Leagues	6th-tier league
Hazfi Cup	National cup	Knockout Cup
Iranian Super Cup	Super cup	Between winners of Persian Gulf Pro League and Hazfi Cup
Takht Jamshid Cup	(Defunct cup)
Kowsar Women Football League	Women's 1st-tier league

==== Iraq ====
===== Leagues =====
- Iraq Stars League: 1st-tier
- Iraqi Premier Division League: 2nd-tier
- Iraqi First Division League: 3rd-tier
- Iraqi Second Division League: 4th-tier
- Iraqi Third Division League: 5th-tier

===== Cups =====
- Iraq FA Cup: National cup
- Iraqi Super Cup: Super cup

===== Defunct =====
- Baghdad Championship
- Iraqi National First Division
- Iraq FA Baghdad Cup
- Iraq Central FA Premier League
- Iraq Central FA Perseverance Cup
- Independent Baghdad Tournament
- Iraq FA Basra Premier League
- Iraq FA Kirkuk Premier League

==== Japan ====
(Japan) Competitions	League/Cup
J1 League	1st-tier league	Organising body: J.League; known as the J.League from 1993 to 1998 before becoming a two-division league, and as J.League Division 1 from 1999 to 2014.
J2 League	2nd-tier league	Organising body: J.League; known as J.League Division 2 until 2014
J3 League	3rd-tier league	Organising body: J.League
J.League 100 Year Vision League	Special tournament	The J1 100 Year Vision League and J2/J3 100 Year Vision League will be held as two separate leagues only during the first half of 2026.
Japan Football League	4th-tier league	Treated as equal to J3 League in theory, but in practice it is considered equivalent to a 4th-tier division.
JFL CUP	Special tournament	Will be held only during the first half of 2026.
Japan Regional Football Champions League	Promotion play-offs to 4th-tier league	Until 2015, known as Regional Football League Competition
Japanese Regional Leagues	5th/6th-tier leagues	5th-tier: Hokkaido League, Tohoku League Division 1, Kanto League Division 1, Tokai League Division 1, Hokushin'etsu League Division 1, Kansai League Division 1, Chugoku League, Shikoku League, Kyushu League; 6th tier: Tohoku League Division 2 North and South, Kanto League Division 2, Tokai League Division 2, Hokushin'etsu League Division 2, Kansai League Division 2.
Prefectural Leagues	6th/7th-tier & below leagues
Emperor's Cup	National cup
J.League Cup	League cup	Organising body: J.League; Until the 2023, only J1 League and J2 League teams participate, but from the 2024, J3 League teams will also join.
Japanese Super Cup	Super cup	Between winners of J1 League and Emperor's Cup
J.League All-Star Soccer	Special competitions	Recently, the name of the competition has been changed and many irregular events are held as charity matches.
All Japan Adults Football Tournament	Non-league cup	Also known as the Zensha or Shakaijin Cup; Only the teams from 5th-tier league and below participate can enter this cup.
All Japan Club Teams Football Tournament	Non-league cup	Only the teams from 7th-tier league enter this cup
National Sports Festival (Football)	Inter-prefectural tournament
All Japan University Football Championship	University tournament
Prime Minister's Cup All Japan University Football Tournament	University tournament
Prince Takamado Trophy	U18 & U15 league
All Japan High School Soccer Tournament	High school tournament
Inter High School Sports Festival	High school tournament
Japan Club Youth U-18 Championship	U-18 cup
J.Youth Cup	Youth cup
WE League	Women's 1st-tier league	Beginning from the 2021–22 season as 1st-tier league
Nadeshiko League	Women's 2nd/3rd-tier leagues	2nd-tier: Nadeshiko League Division 1; 3rd-tier: Nadeshiko League Division 2
Empress's Cup	Women's national cup
WE League Cup	Women's league cup	Organising body: WE League; All teams from the WE League
Nadeshiko League Cup	(Defunct women's league cup)	Organising body: Nadeshiko League; All teams from the Nadeshiko League
Japan Soccer League	(Defunct national league)	1965–1992, each year;
Japan Football League (former)	(Defunct national league)	1992–1998, each year;
Japan Soccer League Cup	(Defunct league cup)	1973, 1976–1991, each year; only the teams from both divisions of Japan Soccer League participated
Japanese Super Cup	(Defunct super cup)	1977–1984, each year; between Japan Soccer League and Emperor's Cup winners
F.League	Futsal 1st/2nd-tier league
All Japan Futsal Championship	Futsal national cup
F.League Ocean Cup	Futsal league cup

==== Jordan ====
===== Leagues =====
- Jordanian Pro League: 1st-tier
- Jordan League Division 1: 2nd-tier

===== Cups =====
- FA Cup: National cup
- Super Cup: Super cup
- FA Shield: Pre-season cup

==== Kuwait ====
===== Leagues =====
- Kuwait Premier League: 1st-tier
- Kuwaiti Division One: 2nd-tier

===== Cups =====
- Kuwait Emir Cup: National cup
- Kuwait Crown Prince Cup: National cup
- Kuwait Federation Cup: League cup
- Kuwait Super Cup: Super cup
- Al Kurafi Cup: defunct

==== Kyrgyzstan ====
===== Leagues =====
- Kyrgyz Premier League: 1st-tier
- Kyrgyz First League: 2nd-tier
- Qyrğyz Ekinçi Ligasy: 3rd-tier

===== Cups =====
- Kyrgyzstan Cup: National cup
- Kyrgyzstan Super Cup: Super cup

==== Laos ====
===== Leagues =====
- Lao League 1: 1st-tier
- Lao League 2: 2nd-tier

===== Cups =====
- Laotian Prime Minister's Cup
- Lao FF Cup: National cup
- Lao FF Super Cup

==== Lebanon ====
===== Leagues =====
- Lebanese Premier League: 1st-tier
- Lebanese Second Division: 2nd-tier
- Lebanese Third Division: 3rd-tier
- Lebanese Fourth Division: 4th-tier
- Lebanese Fifth Division: 5th-tier

===== Cups =====
- Lebanese FA Cup: National cup
- Lebanese Federation Cup: League cup
- Lebanese Super Cup: Super cup
- Lebanese Elite Cup: defunct
- Lebanese Challenge Cup: defunct

==== Macau ====
===== Leagues =====
- Liga de Elite: 1st-tier
- Campeonato da 2ª Divisão do Futebol: 2nd-tier
- Campeonato da 3ª Divisão do Futebol: 3rd-tier

===== Cups =====
- Taça de Macau em futebol: National cup

==== Malaysia ====
===== Leagues =====
- Malaysia Super League: 1st-tier
- Malaysia A1 Semi-Pro League: 2nd-tier
- Malaysia A2 Amateur League: 3rd-tier
- Malaysia A3 Community League: 4th to 9th tier

===== Cups =====
- Malaysia FA Cup: National Cup
- Piala Sumbangsih: Super cup
- Malaysia Cup: Domestic Cup
- MFL Challenge Cup: Domestic Cup
- Malaysia FAM Cup: Domestic Cup
- Airmarine Cup: National Team Cup
- Merdeka Cup: National Team Cup

==== Maldives ====
===== Leagues =====
- Dhivehi Premier League: 1st-tier
- Second Division: 2nd-tier
- Third Division: 3rd-tier

===== Cups =====
- FA Cup: National cup
- President's Cup
- FA Charity Shield: Super cup

==== Mongolia ====
===== Leagues =====
- Mongolian Premier League: 1st-tier
- Mongolian First League: 2nd-tier
- Mongolia Second League: 3rd-tier
- National Amateur Cup: 4th-tier

===== Cups =====
- MFF Cup: National cup
- MFF Super Cup: Super cup

==== Myanmar ====
(Myanmar) Competitions	League/Cup
Myanmar National League	1st-tier league
MNL II	2nd-tier league
MNL II Promotion Amateur Club Tournament	4th-tier league	Competition for promotion to MNL II
MNL (U-21) Youth League	Youth league
FIFA-MFF U15 Youth League	Youth league
General Aung San Shield	National cup	After the 2021 coup, the competition was suspended. It is currently being held under the new name MNL League Cup
MFF Charity Cup	Super cup	Between winners of Myanmar National League and General Aung San Shield. After the 2021 coup, the competition was suspended.
MNL League Cup	Domestic Cup
Myanmar Women League	Women's 1st-tier league
Myanmar Futsal League	1st-tier Futsal League

==== Nepal ====
===== Leagues =====
- Martyr's Memorial A-Division League: 1st-tier
- Martyr's Memorial B-Division League: 2nd-tier
- Martyr's Memorial C-Division League: 3rd-tier

===== Cups =====
- Aaha Gold Cup
- Budda Subba Gold Cup
- Pokhara Cup
- Simara Gold Cup
- Udayapur Gold Cup
- Ncell Cup: National cup
- Birat Gold Cup

==== Northern Mariana Islands ====
===== Leagues =====
- M★League: 1st-tier
- M*League Division 2

==== North Korea ====
===== Leagues =====
- DPR Korea Premier Football League: 1st-tier
- DPR Korea Football League 2: 2nd-tier
- DPR Korea Football League 3: 3rd-tier
- Technical Innovation Contests: defunct

===== Cups =====
- Hwaebul Cup: National cup
- Man'gyŏngdae Prize
- Osandŏk Prize
- Paektusan Prize
- Poch'ŏnbo Torch Prize
- Republican Championship

==== Oman ====
===== Leagues =====
- Oman Professional League: 1st-tier
- Oman First Division League: 2nd-tier
- Oman Second Division League: 3rd-tier

===== Cups =====
- Sultan Qaboos Cup: National cup
- Super Cup: Super cup
- Oman Professional League Cup
- Omani Prince Cup: defunct

==== Palestine ====
===== Leagues =====
- Gaza Strip Premier League: 1st-tier
- Gaza Strip First League: 2nd-tier
- Gaza Strip Second League: 3rd-tier
- West Bank Premier League: 1st-tier
- West Bank First League: 2nd-tier
- West Bank Second League: 3rd-tier

===== Cups =====
- Palestine Cup: National cup
  - Gaza Strip Cup
  - West Bank Cup
- Gaza Strip Super Cup: Super cup
- West Bank Super Cup: Super cup
- Yasser Arafat Cup: Domestic cup

==== Pakistan ====
(Pakistan)	Competitions	League/Cup
Pakistan Football Federation
^{[Sen.Men]} ^{[L]}	Pakistan Premier League	1st-tier league	Started in 2004
^{[Sen.Men]} ^{[L]}	PFF League	2nd-tier league	Started in 2004
^{[Sen.Men]} ^{[L]}	National Football Championship	1st-tier league (Defunct league)	Held between 1948 and 2003
^{[Sen.Men]} ^{[L]}	Karachi Football League	Regional league
^{[Sen.Men]} ^{[L]}	Super Football League	Franchise based league (defunct)	Held in 2007 and 2010
^{[Sen.Men]} ^{[Cup]}	PFF National Challenge Cup	Domestic Cup	Started in 1979
^{[Sen.Women]} ^{[L]}	National Women Football Championship	1st-tier	Annual top-tier cup competition started in 2005
International domestic competition
^{[Sen.Men]} ^{[National]}	Quaid-e-Azam International Tournament	(Defunct cup)	Held during 1970's and 1980's

==== Philippines ====
(Philippines)	Competitions	League/Cup
^{[Sen.Men]} ^{[L]}	Philippines Football League	1st-tier league
^{[Sen.Men]} ^{[Cup]}	Copa Paulino Alcantara	National cup	It's also the League Cup
^{[Sen.Women]} ^{[L]}	PFF Women's League	Women's 1st-tier league
^{[Sen.Women]} ^{[Cup]}	PFF Women's Cup	Women's cup
^{[Sen.Men]} ^{[Cup]}	PFF National Men's Club Championship	National cup	2011–2015
^{[Sen.Men]} ^{[Cup]}	United Football League Cup	League cup	2009–2016
^{[Youth_Men]} ^{[Cup]}	PFF National Men's Under-23 Championship	National U-23 cup	2011–2013
^{[Youth_Men]} ^{[Cup]}	PFF National Men's Under-19 Championship	National U-19 cup	2011–2013
^{[Sen.Men]} ^{[L]}	Philippine Football League	National league	2017-present
^{[Sen.Men]} ^{[L]}	Filipino Premier League	National league	2008
^{[Sen.Men]} ^{[L]}	United Football League	National league	2009–2016
^{[Sen.Men]} ^{[L]}	Philippine Premier League	National league	2018–2019
Manila
^{[Sen.Men]} ^{[Cup]}	University Athletic Association of the Philippines	Collegiate league
^{[Sen.Men]} ^{[L]}	Manila Premier Football League	1st-tier league	1997
Cebu
^{[Sen.Men]} ^{[Cup]}	Aboitiz Football Cup	Cup	Each year (November→March)

==== Qatar ====
(Qatar) Competitions	League/Cup
Qatar Stars League	1st-tier league
Second Division League	2nd-tier league
Reserve League	(Defunct league)
Amir Cup	National cup	formally known as the Emir Cup
Qatari Stars Cup	Cup	Only Stars League
Qatar Cup	Cup	Only top 4 teams of Stars League
Sheikh Jassim Cup	Super cup	Between winners of Stars League and Amir Cup

==== Saudi Arabia ====
(Saudi Arabia) Competitions	League/Cup
Saudi Pro League	1st-tier league
First Division League	2nd-tier league
Second Division League	3rd-tier league
Saudi League 3rd Division	4th-tier league
Saudi League 4th Division	5th-tier leagues	Najran Region League, Jizan Region League, Asir Region League, Bahah Region League, Ha'il Region League, Jawf Region League, Tabuk Region League, Northern Borders Region League, Madinah Region League, Makkah Region League, Makkah Region League((Taif Province League)), Qassim Region League((Rass Province League)), Riyadh Region League((al-Duwadmi Province League, Al Zulfi Province League, Al-Kharj Province League, Al Majma'ahProvince League)), Eastern Province Region League((Dammam Province League, Al-Ahsa Province League, Qatif Province League)).
King's Cup	National cup	officially known as The Custodian of the Two Holy Mosques' Cup
Saudi Crown Prince Cup	League cup	Only the teams from Saudi Pro League and First Division League
Saudi Super Cup	Super cup	Between winners of Saudi Pro League and King's Cup
Saudi Federation Cup	Defunct 2011	Saudi Federation Cup 1975/2001, Prince Faisal Bin Fahad Cup 2001/2011, Faisal Bin Fahad U-23 League 2011
Saudi Women's Premier League	1st-tier women's league

==== Singapore ====
(Singapore)	Competitions	League/Cup
^{[Sen.Men]} ^{[L]}	Singapore Premier League	1st-tier league	Each year; Each team plays every other team twice
^{[Sen.Men]} ^{[L]}	Singapore Football League Division 1	2nd-tier league	Each year; Each team plays every other team in a 1.5 rounds robin
^{[Sen.Men]} ^{[L]}	Singapore Football League Division 2	3rd-tier league	Each year; Each team plays every other team in a 1.5 rounds robin
^{[Sen.Men]} ^{[L]}	Singapore Island Wide League	4th-tier league	Each year; 16-clubs of 2 groups
^{[Sen.Men]} ^{[L]}	Cosmopolitan Football League	Expat league	Each year; Expat clubs consisting of mainly expat players
^{[Sen.Men]} ^{[L]}	Cosmopolitan League Cup	Expat league	Each year; Expat clubs consisting of mainly expat players
^{[Sen.Men]} ^{[L]}	Equatorial Football League	Expat league	Each year; Expat clubs consisting of mainly expat players
^{[Sen.Men]} ^{[L]}	Singapore Cup	National cup	Each year
^{[Sen.Men]} ^{[L]}	Singapore FA Cup	Cup	Each year; 2nd-tier,3rd-tier and 4th-tier clubs' cup compeitition
^{[Sen.Men]} ^{[L]}	Singapore Community Shield	National super cup	Each year
^{[Youth_Men]} ^{[L]}	FAS Centre of Excellence Developmental Leagues	Youth league	Each year; youth football clubs affiliated with Football Association of Singapore
^{[Sen.Women]} ^{[L]}	FAS Women's Premier League	1st-tier women's league	Each year; women's football clubs affiliated with Football Association of Singapore
^{[Sen.Women]} ^{[L]}	FAS Women's National League	2nd-tier women's league	Each year; women's football clubs affiliated with Football Association of Singapore
^{[Futsal]} ^{[L]}	ESPZEN Futsal League	Futsal 5-a-side (4 divisions)	Each year; private futsal league affiliated with Football Association of Singapore
^{[Futsal]} ^{[L]}	D2D International Futsal League	Futsal 5-a-side/4-a-side	Each year; nation top private futsal league
^{[Futsal]} ^{[L]}	D2D Arena Futsal League	Futsal 5-a-side/4-a-side	Each year; nation top private futsal league
^{[Futsal]} ^{[Cup]}	D2D Futsal Cup	Futsal cup	Each year; futsal clubs from International and Arena futsal league

==== South Korea ====
(South Korea) Competitions	League/Cup
K League 1	1st-tier league	Organising body: K League; once known as the Korean Super League, Korean Football Festival, Korean Professional Football League, K League or K League Classic.
K League 2	2nd-tier league	Organising body: K League; known as K League Challenge until 2017
K3 League	3rd-tier league	Semi-professional first level
K4 League	4th-tier league	Semi-professional second level
K5 League (ko)	5th-tier league	Amateur first level
K6 League	6th-tier league	Amateur second level
K7 League	7th-tier league	Amateur third level
Regional competitions	8th-tier and below league
Korea National League	(Defunct league)	held annually from 2003 to 2019
Korea Cup	National cup	Formerly the Korean FA Cup
K League Super Cup	Super cup	between the champions of K League 1 and Korea Cup
K3-K4 Championship	Lower cup
K League All-Star Game	Special competitions	Irregularly held
Korean League Cup	(Defunct cup)
Challengers Cup	(Defunct Lower cup)
Korea National League Championship	(Defunct cup)
Adidas Cup	(Defunct cup)
Daehan Fire Insurance Cup	(Defunct cup)
Phillip Morriss Cup	(Defunct cup)
Prospecs Cup	(Defunct cup)
Hauzen Cup	(Defunct cup)
WK League	Women 1st-tier league	Professional women first level

==== Sri Lanka ====
===== Leagues =====
- S1 League: 1st-tier
- Kit Premier League Division I: 2nd-tier
- Kit Premier League Division II: 3rd-tier

===== Cups =====
- Sri Lanka FA Cup: National cup

==== Syria ====
===== Leagues =====
- Syrian Premier League: 1st-tier
- Syrian League 1st Division: 2nd-tier
- Syrian League 2nd Division: 3rd-tier

===== Cups =====
- Syrian Cup: National cup
- Syrian Super Cup: Super cup

==== Taiwan (Chinese Taipei) ====
(Taiwan) Competitions	League/Cup
Taiwan Football Premier League	1st-tier league
Taiwan Football Challenge League	2nd-tier league	Taiwan Second Division Football League
Intercity Football League	(Defunct league)	Replaced by Taiwan Football Premier League
Enterprise Football League	(Defunct league)	Replaced by Intercity Football League
Highschool Football League	Youth league	Under-19 men
National Youth Cup	Youth cup	Under-19 men, under-17 men, and under-19 women
National High School Games	Youth competition
Chinese Taipei FA Cup	National cup
Taiwan Mulan Football League	Women's 1st-tier league

==== Tajikistan ====
===== Leagues =====
- Vysshaya Liga: 1st-tier
- Tajikistan First League: 2nd-tier
- Tajikistan Second League: 3rd-tier
- Tajikistan Regional Leagues: 4th-tier

===== Cups =====
- Tajikistan Cup: National cup
- Tajikistan Super Cup: Super cup
- TFF Cup: Pre-season cup

==== Thailand ====
(Thailand) Competitions	League/Cup
Thai League 1	1st-tier league
Thai League 2	2nd-tier league	(The top 3 teams promotion to the Thai League.)
Thai League 3	3rd-tier league	3rd-tier:North Eastern Region, Northern Region, Central & Eastern Region, Central & Western Region, Bangkok & field Region, Southern Region. (The league winners and runners up of 6 regional groups would enter the championships stage. Twelve teams were split into two groups of A & B, with the top two teams from group A & B gaining promotion to the Thai Division 1 League)
Thailand Semi-Pro League	4th-tier league
Thailand Amateur League	5th-tier league
Thai League 4	(Defunct 4th-tier league until 2020)
Thai FA Cup	National Cup
Thai League Cup	League Cup
Thailand Champions Cup	Super Cup	Between winners of Thai League 1 and Thai FA Cup.
Thai League All-Star Football	Special competition
Provincial League	(Defunct national League)	1999–2008, each year;
Kor Royal Cup	(Defunct super Cup)	1916–2016, each year;
Khǒr Royal Cup	(Defunct non-league cup)	1916–2015, each year;
Khor Royal Cup	(Defunct non-league cup)	1962–2015, each year;
Ngor Royal Cup	(Defunct non-league cup)	1962–2015, each year;

==== Timor-Leste ====
===== Leagues =====
- Liga Futebol Timor-Leste
  - Liga Futebol Amadora Primeira Divisão: 1st-tier
  - Liga Futebol Amadora Segunda Divisão: 2nd-tier
  - Liga Futebol Amadora Terceira Divisão: 3rd-tier

===== Cups =====
- Taça 12 de Novembro: National cup
- LFA Super Taça: Super cup

==== Turkmenistan ====
===== Leagues =====
- Ýokary Liga: 1st-tier
- Birinji Liga: 2nd-tier

===== Cups =====
- Turkmenistan Cup: National cup
- Turkmenistan Super Cup: Super cup

==== United Arab Emirates ====
===== Leagues =====
====== Professional Leagues ======
- UAE Pro League: 1st-tier
- UAE First Division League: 2nd-tier
- UAE Second Division League: 3rd-tier

====== Semi Professional Leagues ======
- UAE Third Division League: 4th-tier

===== Cups =====
- UAE President's Cup: National cup
- UAE League Cup: League cup
- UAE FA cup: League cup
- UAE Super Cup: Super cup

==== Uzbekistan ====
===== Leagues =====
- Uzbekistan Super League: 1st-tier
- Uzbekistan Pro League: 2nd-tier
- Uzbekistan Pro-B League: 3rd-tier
- Uzbekistan Second League: 4th-tier
- Uzbekistan Regional Championships: 5th and below

===== Cups =====
- Uzbekistan Cup: National cup
- Uzbekistan League Cup: League cup
- Uzbekistan Super Cup: Super cup
- Uzbekistan PFL Cup

==== Vietnam ====
===== Leagues =====
- V.League 1: 1st-tier
- V.League 2: 2nd-tier
- Vietnamese League Two: 3rd-tier
- Vietnamese League Three: 4th-tier
- Vietnamese Women's Football Championship

===== Cups =====
- Vietnamese National Football Cup: National cup
- Vietnamese Super Cup: Super cup

==== Yemen ====
===== Leagues =====
- Yemeni League: 1st-tier
- Yemeni Second Division: 2nd-tier

===== Cups =====
- Yemeni President Cup: National cup
- Yemeni Super Cup: Super cup

== CAF (African competitions) ==
This section lists the competitions ruled by the Confederation of African Football (CAF), or by federation members of the CAF.

=== National teams ===
- Africa Cup of Nations
- African Nations League: Upcoming competition.
- U-23 Africa Cup of Nations: Linked with Qualifiers for the Men's Olympic Football Tournament.
- U-20 Africa Cup of Nations
- U-17 Africa Cup of Nations
- Women's Africa Cup of Nations: Women's cup; Linked with Qualifiers for the FIFA Women's World Cup.
- CAF Women's Olympic Qualifying Tournament: Women's
- African U-20 Women's World Cup qualification: Women's
- African U-17 Women's World Cup qualification: Women's
- African Games

==== Defunct ====
- African Nations Championship
- Afro-Asian Cup of Nations

==== Sub-federation competitions ====
- CECAFA Cup
- COSAFA Cup
- COSAFA Women's Championship: Women's
- WAFU Nations Cup
- U-17 UNIFFAC Cup
- UNAF U-23 Tournament

===== Defunct =====
- CEMAC Cup
- Amílcar Cabral Cup

=== Clubs ===
- CAF Champions League: 1st-tier cup
- CAF Confederation Cup: 2nd-tier cup
- CAF Super Cup: Super cup
- CAF Women's Champions League: Women's

==== Defunct ====
- CAF Cup
- African Football League
- African Cup Winners' Cup
- Afro-Asian Club Championship

==== Sub-federation competitions ====
- UNAF Nessma Cup
- West African Club Championship
- CECAFA Club Cup

=== Domestic ===
==== Algeria ====
(Algeria)	Competitions	League/Cup
^{[Sen.Men]} ^{[L]}	Algerian Ligue Professionnelle 1	1st-tier league	Each year (August→June); Each team plays every other team twice
^{[Sen.Men]} ^{[L]}	Algerian Ligue Professionnelle 2	2nd-tier league	Each year (August→June); Each team plays every other team twice
^{[Sen.Men]} ^{[L]}	Ligue Nationale	3rd-tier league	Each year (August→June); Each team plays every other team twice
^{[Sen.Men]} ^{[L]}	Ligue Inter-Régions	4th-tier league	Each year (August→June); Each team plays every other team twice
^{[Sen.Men]} ^{[L]}	Ligue Régional I & II	5th/6th-tier leagues	Each year (August→June); Each team plays every other team twice
^{[Sen.Men]} ^{[Cup]}	Algerian Cup	National cup	Each year (National phase: January→June)
^{[Sen.Men]} ^{[Cup]}	Algerian Super Cup	Super cup	Each year (November); Between Algerian Championnat National and Algerian Cup winners
^{[Sen.Men]} ^{[Cup]}	Algerian League Cup	League cup	1992–2000
^{[Youth_Men]} ^{[L]}	Argerian U21 League	U21 league
^{[Youth_Men]} ^{[Cup]}	U21 Cup
^{[Sen.Women]} ^{[L]}	Algerian Women's Championship	Women 1st-tier league	Each year (August→June); Each team plays every other team twice
^{[Sen.Women]} ^{[Cup]}	Algerian Women's Cup	Women National cup	Each year

==== Angola ====
(Angola)	Competitions	League/Cup
^{[Sen.Men]} ^{[L]}	Girabola	1st-tier league	Each year (February→October); Each team plays every other team twice
^{[Sen.Men]} ^{[L]}	Segundona	2nd-tier league	Each year (February→October); Each team plays every other team twice
^{[Sen.Men]} ^{[L]}	Angolan Provincial Football Stage	3rd-tier league	Each year (February→October); Each team plays every other team twice
^{[Sen.Men]} ^{[Cup]}	Angolan SuperCup	Super cup	Each year (February); Between Girabola and Angolan Cup winners
^{[Sen.Men]} ^{[Cup]}	Angolan Cup	National cup	Each year (National phase: June→November)
^{[Sen.Women]} ^{[L]}	Angolan Women's Football League	Women's 1st-tier league
^{[Sen.Women]} ^{[L]}	Campeonato Provincial de Futebol Feminino de Angola	Women's 2nd-tier league

==== Benin ====
===== Leagues =====
- Benin Premier League: 1st-tier
- Benin Second Division: 2nd-tier

===== Cups =====
- Benin Cup: National cup
- Benin Super Cup: Super cup

==== Botswana ====
===== Leagues =====
- Botswana Premier League: 1st-tier
- Botswana First Division North: 2nd-tier
- Botswana First Division South: 2nd-tier
- Botswana Division One: 3rd-tier

===== Cups =====
- FA Challenge Cup (Botswana): National cup
- Botswana Independence Cup
- Orange Kabelano Charity Cup
- Mascom Top 8 Cup: Cup (Top 8 of 1st-tier League)

==== Burkina Faso ====
===== Leagues =====
- Burkinabé Premier League: 1st-tier

===== Cups =====
- Coupe du Faso: National cup
- Burkinabé SuperCup: Super cup

==== Burundi ====
===== Leagues =====
- Burundi Premier League: 1st-tier

===== Cups =====
- Burundian Cup: National cup
- Burundi Super Cup: Super cup

==== Cameroon ====
===== Leagues =====
- Championnat du Cameroun de football: 1st-tier
- Cameroon Deuxième Division: 2nd-tier

===== Cups =====
- Cameroon Cup: National cup
- Super Coupe Roger Milla: Super cup

==== Cape Verde ====
===== Leagues =====
- Cape Verdean Football Championship: 1st-tier
- 2nd level football leagues in Cape Verde : 2nd-tier

===== Cups =====
- Taça Nacional de Cabo Verde: National cup
- Cape Verdean Super Cup: Super cup
- Cape Verde Independence Cup

==== Central African Republic ====
===== Leagues =====
- Central African Republic League: 1st-tier
- Central African Republic League D2: 2nd-tier

===== Cups =====
- Coupe Nationale: National cup
- Central African Republic Supercoupe: Super cup

==== Chad ====
===== Leagues =====
- Chad Premier League: 1st-tier
- Chad Division 2: 2nd-tier

===== Cups =====
- Chad Cup: National cup
- Chad Super Cup: Super cup
- Coupe de Ligue de N'Djaména

==== Comoros ====
===== Leagues =====
- Comoros Premier League: 1st-tier
  - Mwali league
  - Ndzuwani league
  - Ngazidja league

===== Cups =====
- Comoros Cup: National cup
- Comoros Super Cup: Super cup

==== Congo ====
===== Leagues =====
- Congo Premier League: 1st-tier

===== Cups =====
- Coupe du Congo: National cup
- Super Coupe du Congo: Super cup

==== DR Congo ====
===== Leagues =====
- Linafoot: 1st-tier
- Linafoot Ligue 2: 2nd-tier

===== Cups =====
- Coupe du Congo: National cup
- Super Coupe du Congo: Super cup

==== Djibouti ====
===== Leagues =====
- Djibouti Premier League: 1st-tier

===== Cups =====
- Djibouti Cup: National cup
- Djibouti Super Cup: Super cup

==== Egypt ====
(Egypt)	Competitions	League/Cup
^{[Sen.Men]} ^{[L]}	Egyptian Premier League	1st-tier league
^{[Sen.Men]} ^{[L]}	Egyptian Second Division A	2nd-tier league
^{[Sen.Men]} ^{[L]}	Egyptian Second Division B	3rd-tier league
^{[Sen.Men]} ^{[L]}	Egyptian Third Division	4th-tier league
^{[Sen.Men]} ^{[L]}	Egyptian Fourth Division	5th-tier league
^{[Sen.Men]} ^{[L]}	Egypt Development League	Development league
^{[Sen.Men]} ^{[Cup]}	Egypt Cup	National cup
^{[Sen.Men]} ^{[Cup]}	Egyptian Super Cup	Super cup
^{[Sen.Men]} ^{[Cup]}	Egyptian League Cup	League cup
^{[Sen.Men]} ^{[Cup]}	Egypt's Love Cup	cup tournament
^{[Sen.Men]} ^{[Cup]}	EFA League Cup	defunct cup
^{[Sen.Men]} ^{[Cup]}	Sultan Hussein Cup	defunct cup

==== Equatorial Guinea ====
===== Leagues =====
- Equatoguinean Primera División: 1st-tier
- Equatorial Guinea Segunda División: 2nd-tier

===== Cups =====
- Equatoguinean Cup: National cup
- Equatoguinean SuperCup: Super cup

==== Eritrea ====
===== Leagues =====
- Eritrean Premier League: 1st-tier

===== Cups =====
- Eritrean Cup: National cup

==== Eswatini ====
===== Leagues =====
- Premier League of Eswatini: 1st-tier

===== Cups =====
- Swazi Cup: National cup
- Swazi Charity Cup: Super cup

==== Ethiopia ====
===== Leagues =====
- Ethiopian Premier League: 1st-tier
- Ethiopian Higher League: 2nd-tier
- Ethiopian First League: 3rd-tier

===== Cups =====
- Ethiopian Cup: National cup
- Addis Ababa City Cup
- Ethiopian Super Cup: Super cup

==== Gabon ====
===== Leagues =====
- Gabon Championnat National D1: 1st-tier
- Gabon Championnat National D2: 2nd-tier

===== Cups =====
- Coupe du Gabon Interclubs: National cup
- Supercoupe du Gabon: Super cup

==== The Gambia ====
===== Leagues =====
- GFF League First Division: 1st-tier
- GFF League Second Division: 2nd-tier
- GFA League Third Division: 3rd-tier

===== Cups =====
- Gambian Cup: National cup
- Gambian Super Cup: Super cup

==== Ghana ====
===== Leagues =====
- Ghana Premier League: 1st-tier
- Ghana Football Leagues: 2nd/3rd/4th-tier

===== Cups =====
- Ghanaian FA Cup: National cup
- Ghana Super Cup: Super cup

==== Guinea ====
===== Leagues =====
- Guinée Championnat National: 1st-tier

===== Cups =====
- Guinée Coupe Nationale: National cup
- Supercoupe de Guinée: Super cup

==== Guinea-Bissau ====
===== Leagues =====
- Campeonato Nacional da Guiné-Bissau: 1st-tier

===== Cups =====
- Taça Nacional da Guiné Bissau: National cup
- SuperTaça Nacional da Guiné-Bissau: Super cup

==== Ivory Coast ====
===== Leagues =====
- Ligue 1: 1st-tier
- Ligue 2: 2nd-tier
- Championnat Division 3: 3rd-tier
- Division Regionale

===== Cups =====
- Coupe de Côte d'Ivoire de football: National cup
- Coupe Houphouët-Boigny: Super cup

==== Kenya ====
===== Leagues =====
- Kenyan Premier League: 1st-tier
- Kenyan National Super League: 2nd-tier
- FKF Division One: 3rd-tier
- Kenyan Regional Leagues: 4th-tier
- Kenyan County Champions League: 5th-tier
- Kenyan Sub-County Leagues: 6th-tier

===== Cups =====
- FKF President's Cup: National cup
- Kenyan Super Cup: Super cup
- KPL Top 8 Cup: Cup (Top 8 of 1st-tier League)

==== Lesotho ====
===== Leagues =====
- Lesotho Premier League: 1st-tier
- Lesotho A Division: 2nd-tier

===== Cups =====
- Lesotho Independence Cup: National cup
- MGC Supa 8

==== Liberia ====
===== Leagues =====
- Liberian First Division: 1st-tier
- Liberian Second Division League: 2nd-tier
- LFA Sub-Committee League: 3rd-tier

===== Cups =====
- Liberian Cup: National cup
- Liberian National County Meet
- Liberian Super Cup: Super cup

==== Libya ====
===== Leagues =====
- Libyan Premier League: 1st-tier
- Libyan Second Division: 2nd-tier
- Libyan Third Division: 3rd-tier
- Libyan Fourth Division: 4th-tier

===== Cups =====
- Libyan Cup: National cup
- Libyan League Cup
- Libyan Super Cup: Super cup

==== Madagascar ====
===== Leagues =====
- Malagasy Pro League: 1st-tier

===== Cups =====
- Coupe de Madagascar: National cup
- Super Coupe de Madagascar: Super cup

==== Malawi ====
===== Leagues =====
- Super League: 1st-tier ; also known as the FDH Bank Premiership
- Airtel Top 8 Malawi: tournament; 8 teams from the previous Super League season
- SRF League
- FMB Under 20 Youth League

===== Cups =====
- FDH Bank Cup: National cup
- Malawi Charity Shield
- Malawi Carlsberg Cup
- Malawi Presidential Cup

==== Mali ====
===== Leagues =====
- Malian Première Division: 1st-tier
- Malian Division 1: 2nd-tier

===== Cups =====
- Malian Cup: National cup
- Super Coupe National du Mali: Super cup

==== Mauritania ====
===== Leagues =====
- Ligue 1 Mauritania: 1st-tier
- Ligue 2 Mauritania: 2nd-tier

===== Cups =====
- Mauritanian President's Cup: National cup
- Mauritanian Super Cup: Super cup

==== Mauritius ====
===== Leagues =====
- Mauritian League: 1st-tier
- Mauritian First Division: 2nd-tier

===== Cups =====
- Mauritian Cup: National cup
- Mauritian Republic Cup
- Millenium Cup
- Ram Ruhee Memorial Cup
- MFA Super Cup: Super cup

==== Morocco ====
(Morocco)	Competitions	League/Cup
^{[Sen.Men]} ^{[L]}	Botola Pro	1st-tier league	Each year (August→May); Each team plays every other team twice
^{[Sen.Men]} ^{[L]}	Botola Pro 2	2nd-tier league	Each year (August→May); Each team plays every other team twice
^{[Sen.Men]} ^{[L]}	Amateur National Championship	3rd-tier league	Each year (August→May); Each team plays every other team twice
^{[Sen.Men]} ^{[Cup]}	Moroccan Throne Cup	National cup	also known as Coupe du Trône; Each year (National phase: August→November)
^{[Sen.Men]} ^{[Cup]}	Moroccan Super Cup	Super cup	Each year – Contested by the winners of the Botola and the Moroccan Throne Cup.

==== Mozambique ====
===== Leagues =====
- Moçambola: 1st-tier

===== Cups =====
- Taça de Moçambique: National cup
- Supertaça de Moçambique: Super cup

==== Namibia ====
===== Leagues =====
- Namibia Premier League: 1st-tier
- Namibia First Division: 2nd-tier
- Namibia Women's Super League

===== Cups =====
- Namibia FA Cup: National cup
- Namibian Newspaper Cup: Youth cup
- Namibia Super Cup: Super cup

==== Niger ====
===== Leagues =====
- Super Ligue: 1st-tier

===== Cups =====
- Niger Cup: National cup
- Niger Super Cup: Super cup

==== Nigeria ====
===== Leagues =====
- Nigeria Premier Football League: 1st-tier
- Nigeria National League: 2nd-tier
- Nigeria Nationwide League One: 3rd-tier
- Nigeria Nationwide League Division Two: 4th-tier
- Nigeria Nationwide League Division Three: 5th-tier
- Non-League regional amateur leagues: 6th-tier

===== Cups =====
- Nigerian FA Cup: National cup
- Nigerian Super Cup: Super cup
- Super 4 (Nigeria)

==== Réunion ====
===== Leagues =====
- Réunion Premier League: 1st-tier

===== Cups =====
- Coupe de la Réunion: National cup
- Coupe de France

==== Rwanda ====
===== Leagues =====
- Rwanda Premier League: 1st-tier
- Rwandan Second Division: 2nd-tier
- Rwandan Third Division: 3rd-tier
- Rwanda Women's Football League

===== Cups =====
- Rwandan Cup: National cup
- Rwandan Super Cup: Super cup

==== São Tomé and Príncipe ====
===== Leagues =====
- São Tomé and Príncipe Championship: 1st-tier
- São Tomé Island League
- Príncipe Island League

===== Cups =====
- Taça Nacional de São Tomé e Principe: National cup
- São Tomé Island Cup
- Príncipe Island Cup
- São Tomé and Príncipe Super Cup

==== Senegal ====
===== Leagues =====
- Senegal Premier League: 1st-tier
- Senegal Ligue 1
- Senegal Ligue 2
- Senegal Nationale 1
- Senegal Nationale 2

===== Cups =====
- Senegal FA Cup: National cup
- Senegalese Super Cup: Super cup
- Senegalese League Cup

==== Seychelles ====
===== Leagues =====
- Seychelles First Division: 1st-tier
- Seychelles Division Two: 2nd-tier
- Seychelles Division Three: 3rd-tier

===== Cups =====
- Airtel Cup
- Seychelles FA Cup: National cup

==== Sierra Leone ====
===== Leagues =====
- Sierra Leone National Premier League: 1st-tier
- Sierra Leone FA Division One: 2nd-tier
- Sierra Leone FA Division Two: 3rd-tier

===== Cups =====
- Sierra Leonean FA Cup: National cup
- Sierra Leonean Charity Shield

==== Somalia ====
===== Leagues =====
- Somali First Division: 1st-tier
- Somali Second Division: 2nd-tier
- Somali Third Division: 3rd-tier
- Somalia Fourth League: 4th-tier

===== Cups =====
- Somalia Cup: National cup
- Somalia Super Cup: Super cup

==== South Africa ====
===== Leagues =====
- Premier Soccer League: Leagues administrator
  - South African Premiership: 1st-tier
  - South African Championship: 2nd-tier
- SAFA Second Division: 3rd-tier
- SAFA Regional League: 4th-tier
- LFA Super League: 5th-tier
- PSL Reserve League: Youth league

===== Cups =====
- Knockout Cup
- Nedbank Cup: National cup
- MTN 8

==== South Sudan ====
===== Leagues =====
- South Sudan Football Championship: 1st-tier
- South Sudan Premier League: 2nd-tier

===== Cups =====
- South Sudan National Cup: National cup
- S.S.D Super Cup: Super cup

==== Sudan ====
===== Leagues =====
- Sudan Premier League: 1st-tier
- Khartoum League (defunct)

===== Cups =====
- Sudan Cup: National cup
- Sudan Super Cup: Super cup

==== Tanzania ====
===== Leagues =====
- Tanzanian Premier League: 1st-tier
- Tanzanian Championship League: 2nd-tier
- Tanzanian First League: 3rd-tier

===== Cups =====
- Tanzania FA Cup: National cup
- Tanzania Community Shield

==== Togo ====
===== Leagues =====
- Championnat National de Premiere Division: 1st-tier

===== Cups =====
- Coupe du Togo: National cup
- Supercoupe du Togo: Super cup

==== Tunisia ====
(Tunisia)	Competitions	League/Cup
^{[Sen.Men]} ^{[L]}	Tunisian Ligue Professionnelle 1	1st-tier league	Each year (August→May); Each team plays every other team twice
^{[Sen.Men]} ^{[L]}	Tunisian Ligue Professionnelle 2	2nd-tier league	Each year (August→May); Each team plays every other team twice
^{[Sen.Men]} ^{[L]}	Tunisian Ligue 3	3rd-tier league	Each year (August→May); Each team plays every other team twice
^{[Sen.Men]} ^{[L]}	Tunisian Ligue Amateur 4	4th-tier league	Each year (August→May); Each team plays every other team twice
^{[Sen.Men]} ^{[L]}	Tunisian Ligue Amateur 5	5th-tier league	Each year (August→May); Each team plays every other team twice
^{[Sen.Men]} ^{[Cup]}	Tunisian Cup	National cup	Each year (National phase: August→January)
^{[Sen.Men]} ^{[Cup]}	Tunisian Super Cup	Super cup

==== Uganda ====
===== Leagues =====
- Uganda Premier League: 1st-tier - Men
- FUFA Big League: 2nd-tier - Men
- FUFA Regional Leagues: 3rd-tier
- FUFA Women Super League: 1st-tier-Women
- FUFA Women Elite League: 2nd-tier-women

===== Cups =====
- Ugandan Cup: National cup
- Uganda Super 8 Cup

==== Zambia ====
===== Leagues =====
- Zambia Super League: 1st-tier
- Zambia National League: 2nd-tier

===== Cups =====
- Zambian Cup: National cup
  - Zambian Independence Cup: defunct
  - Northern Rhodesia Castle Cup: defunct
- ABSA Cup
- Zambian Challenge Cup
- Zambian Coca-Cola Cup
- Zambian Charity Shield: Super cup

==== Zanzibar ====
===== Leagues =====
- Zanzibar Premier League: 1st-tier

===== Cups =====
- Zanzibar Cup: National cup
- Zanzibari Charity Shield

==== Zimbabwe ====
===== Leagues =====
- Zimbabwe Premier Soccer League: 1st-tier
- Zimbabwe Division 1: 2nd-tier
- Zimbabwe Third Division: 3rd-tier

===== Cups =====
- Zimbabwean Independence Trophy
- Cup of Zimbabwe: National cup
- BancABC Super8 Cup
- NetOne Charity Shield
- Bob 91 Super Cup
- Uhuru Cup
- Zimbabwe National Army Charity Shield

== CONCACAF (North American, Central American, and Caribbean competitions) ==
This section lists competitions overseen either by CONCACAF (Confederation of North, Central America, and Caribbean Association Football) or its member federations.

=== National teams ===
- CONCACAF Gold Cup
- CONCACAF Nations League: also determine qualify for the next edition of the CONCACAF Gold Cup; in the top league, League A, the winners of each groups go on to play in the CONCACAF Nations League Finals.
- CONCACAF Series: meant to provide matches for member nations that were already eliminated from FIFA World Cup qualifiers.
- CONCACAF Men's Olympic Qualifying
- CONCACAF Under-20 Championship: Linked with Qualifiers for the Men's Olympic Football Tournament.
- Pan American Games
- CONCACAF Under-17 Championship
- CONCACAF Boys' Under-15 Championship
- CONCACAF W Championship: Women's cup; Linked with Qualifiers for the FIFA Women's World Cup and Women's Olympic Football Tournament.
- CONCACAF W Gold Cup: Women's
- CONCACAF Women's Olympic Qualifying: Women's
- CONCACAF Women's Under-20 Championship: Women's
- CONCACAF Women's Under-17 Championship: Women's
- CONCACAF Girls' Under-15 Championship: Women's

==== Defunct ====
- CONCACAF Championship
- CONCACAF Cup

==== Sub-federation competitions ====
- ABCS Tournament (CFU)

===== Defunct =====
- North American Nations Cup
- Copa Centroamericana
- Caribbean Cup

=== Clubs ===
- CONCACAF Champions Cup: 1st-tier cup; known as CONCACAF Champions League from 2008 to 2023.
- CONCACAF Under-13 Champions League: youth

==== Defunct ====
- CONCACAF League
- CONCACAF Cup Winners Cup
- CONCACAF Giants Cup
- SuperLiga
- Copa Interamericana
- UNCAF Interclub Cup

==== Sub-federation competitions ====
- Leagues Cup: Mexico–US cup (NAFU)
- Campeones Cup: Mexico-US super cup (NAFU)
- CONCACAF Central American Cup (UNCAF)
- CONCACAF Caribbean Cup (CFU)
- CFU Club Shield (CFU)

===== Defunct =====
- UNCAF Interclub Cup (UNCAF)
- CONCACAF Caribbean Club Championship (CFU)

=== Domestic ===
==== Anguilla ====
===== Leagues =====
- AFA Senior Male League: 1st-tier
- AFA Senior Female League

===== Cups =====
- AFA Knockout Cup

==== Antigua and Barbuda ====
===== Leagues =====
- Antigua and Barbuda Premier Division: 1st-tier
- Antigua and Barbuda First Division: 2nd-tier

===== Cups =====
- Antigua and Barbuda FA Cup: National cup

==== Aruba ====
===== Leagues =====
- Aruban Division di Honor: 1st-tier
- Aruban Division Uno: 2nd-tier
- Aruban Division Dos: 3rd-tier
- Aruban Liga Hubenil

===== Cups =====
- Torneo Copa Betico Croes: National cup

==== Bahamas ====
===== Leagues =====
- BFA Senior League: 1st-tier
- Grand Bahama Football League: 2nd-tier
- New Providence Football League: 2nd-tier

===== Cups =====
- Bahamas President's Cup: National cup
- Grand Bahama FA Cup
- New Providence FA Cup

==== Barbados ====
===== Leagues =====
- Barbados Premier League: 1st-tier
- Barbados Division One: 2nd-tier
- Barbados Division Two: 3rd-tier

===== Cups =====
- Barbados FA Cup: National cup

==== Belize ====
===== Leagues =====
- Premier League of Belize: 1st-tier
- Belize Premier Football League: defunct
- Super League of Belize: defunct

==== Bermuda ====
===== Leagues =====
- Bermudian Premier Division: 1st-tier
- Bermuda First Division: 2nd-tier

===== Cups =====
- Bermuda FA Cup: National cup

==== Bonaire ====
===== Leagues =====
- Bonaire League: 1st-tier

===== Cups =====
- Kopa MCB: National cup

==== British Virgin Islands ====
===== Leagues =====
- BVIFA National Football League: 1st-tier
- Tortola League
- Virgin Gorda League

===== Cups =====
- Terry Evans Knockout Cup
- Wendol Williams Cup

==== Canada ====
===== Leagues =====
(Canada) League	Tier	Teams	Schedule	Description
Canadian Premier League	1st	8 teams	28 regular-season matches (April→October)	Each team playing all other teams twice home and twice away. The top four teams compete in the league playoffs (Canadian Premier League Finals) at the end of the season, with the CPL champion and the regular season winner qualifying for the CONCACAF Champions League.
Major League Soccer	1st (US)	27 teams total, 3 from Canada: Vancouver Whitecaps, Toronto FC, CF Montréal	34 regular-season matches (March→October)	Each team playing all other teams in its conference home and away, plus all teams in the other conference once. Playoffs (October→November). Includes 24 teams from the United States.
Ontario Premier League	3rd (regional)	22 teams	21 regular-season matches (May→October)	Each team playing one match against all other teams. The top six teams compete in the league playoffs at the end of the season, with the champion qualifying for the Canadian Championship.
LS Pro	3rd (regional)	12 teams	22 regular-season matches (May→October)	Each team playing all other teams once home and once away, with the regular season winner qualifying for the Canadian Championship. The top four teams compete in the Coupe PLSQ at the end of the season.
British Columbia Premier League	3rd (regional)	7 teams	12 regular-season matches (May→July)	Each team playing all other teams once home and once away. The top six teams compete in the championship match, with the champion qualifying for the Canadian Championship.
Alberta Premier League	3rd (regional)	8 teams	14 regular-season matches (May→August)	Each team playing all other teams once home and once away, with the regular season winner qualifying for the Canadian Championship.
Prairies Premier League	3rd (regional)	6 teams	10 regular-season matches (May→July)	Each team playing all other teams once home and once away, with the regular season winner.

===== Cups =====
- Canadian Championship: National cup for professional and semi-professional teams; determines one of the country's qualifiers for the CONCACAF Champions League.
- Challenge Trophy: National cup for amateur teams.

==== Cayman Islands ====
===== Leagues =====
- Cayman Islands Premier League: 1st-tier
- Cayman Islands First Division: 2nd-tier

===== Cups =====
- Cayman Islands FA Cup: National cup
- Cayman Islands Digicel Cup

==== Costa Rica ====
===== Leagues =====
- Liga FPD: 1st-tier
- Liga de Ascenso: 2nd-tier
- Linafa: 3rd-tier
- Costa Rican women's football championship

===== Cups =====
- Costa Rican Cup: National cup
- Supercopa de Costa Rica: Super cup

==== Cuba ====
===== Leagues =====
- Liga Nacional de Fútbol de Cuba: 1st-tier
- Torneo de Ascenso

==== Curaçao ====
===== Leagues =====
- Curaçao Promé Divishon: 1st-tier
- Sekshon Amatùr

==== Dominica ====
===== Leagues =====
- Dominica Premier League: 1st-tier
- Dominica First Division: 2nd-tier

===== Cups =====
- CFU Club Championship

==== Dominican Republic ====
===== Leagues =====
- Liga Dominicana de Fútbol: 1st-tier
- Primera División de Republica Dominicana: defunct

===== Cups =====
- Copa Dominicana de Fútbol: National cup

==== El Salvador ====
===== Leagues =====
- Salvadoran Primera División: 1st-tier
- Segunda División de Fútbol Salvadoreño: 2nd-tier
- Tercera Division de Fútbol Salvadoreño: 3rd-tier
- Salvadoran women's football championship

===== Cups =====
- Copa Presidente: National cup

==== French Guiana ====
===== Leagues =====
- French Guiana Honor Division: 1st-tier
- French Guiana Promotion of Honor: 2nd-tier

===== Cups =====
- Coupe de Guyane: National cup

==== Guatemala ====
(Guatemala) Competitions	League/Cup
Liga Guate	1st-tier league	Also known as the Liga Nacional de Guatemala
Primera División de Ascenso	2nd-tier league
Segunda División de Ascenso	3rd-tier league
Tercera División de Guatemala	4th-tier league
Copa de Guatemala	National cup	Features teams from Liga Guate and Primera División de Ascenso.
National Women's Football League of Guatemala	Women's first-tier league

==== Grenada ====
===== Leagues =====
- GFA Premier Division: 1st-tier
- GFA First Division: 2nd-tier
- GFA Second Division: 3rd-tier

===== Cups =====
- GFA Super Knockout Cup: National cup

==== Guadeloupe ====
===== Leagues =====
- Guadeloupe Division of Honor: 1st-tier
- Guadalupe Honorary Promotion Championship: 2nd-tier

===== Cups =====
- Coupe de Guadeloupe: National cup
- Coupe de France

==== Guyana ====
===== Leagues =====
- GFF National Super League: 1st-tier
- Guyana FA Divisions: 2nd-tier

===== Cups =====
- Guyana Mayors Cup: National cup
- GFF Super 8 Cup
- Georgetown Regional Cup

==== Haiti ====
===== Leagues =====
- Ligue Haitienne: 1st-tier

===== Cups =====
- Coupe d'Haïti: National cup

==== Honduras ====
===== Leagues =====
- Liga Nacional de Fútbol Profesional de Honduras: 1st-tier
- Liga Nacional de Ascenso de Honduras: 2nd-tier
- Liga Mayor de Futbol de Honduras: 3rd-tier

===== Cups =====
- Honduran Cup: National cup
- Honduran Supercup: Super cup

==== Jamaica ====
===== Leagues =====
- Jamaica National Premier League: first level
- KSAFA Super League: second level
- South Central Confederation Super League: second level
- Eastern Confederation Super League: second level
- Western Confederation Super League: second level

===== Cups =====
- JFF Champions Cup: National cup

==== Martinique ====
===== Leagues =====
- Martinique Championnat National: 1st-tier
- Martinique Promotion d'Honneur: 2nd-tier

===== Cups =====
- Coupe de la Martinique: National cup
- Coupe de France

==== Mexico ====
(Mexico) Competitions	League/Cup
Liga MX	1st-tier league	Also known as the Primera División de México
Liga de Expansión MX	2nd-tier league	looking to be promoted to Liga MX
Liga Premier de México	3rd-tier leagues	3rd-tier:Serie A de México (looking to be promoted to Liga de Expansión MX); 3rd-tier:Serie B de México (looking to be promoted to Serie A de México)
Liga TDP	4th-tier league
Ascenso MX	(Defunct 2nd-tier league)
Copa MX	National cup	Features teams from Liga MX and Liga de Expansión MX.
Campeón de Campeones	Super cup	Between winners of the previous Liga MX Apertura and Clausura seasons.
Supercopa MX	Super cup	Between winners of the previous Copa MX Apertura and Clausura seasons.
Liga MX Femenil	Women's first-tier league
Super Liga Femenil de Fútbol	Women's second-tier league	Not linked to Liga MX Femenil

==== Montserrat ====
===== Leagues =====
- Montserrat Championship: 1st-tier

==== Nicaragua ====
===== Leagues =====
- Liga Primera de Nicaragua: 1st-tier
- Liga de Ascenso de Nicaragua: 2nd-tier
- Campeonato Nacional de Segunda División: 3rd-tier
- Nicaraguan women's football championship: Women's 1st-tier

===== Cups =====
- Copa de Nicaragua: National cup

==== Panama ====
===== Leagues =====
- Liga Panameña de Fútbol: 1st-tier
- Liga Nacional de Ascenso: 2nd-tier
- Copa Rommel Fernández: 3rd-tier

===== Cups =====
- Copa Panamá: National cup

==== Puerto Rico ====
===== Leagues =====
- Liga Puerto Rico: 1st-tier
- Puerto Rico Soccer League
- Liga Mayor de Fútbol Nacional: defunct
- Campeonato Nacional de Fútbol de Puerto Rico: defunct
- Liga Nacional de Fútbol de Puerto Rico: defunct

===== Cups =====
- Torneo de Copa de Puerto Rico
- Copa Luis Villarejo: National cup
- Puerto Rico Soccer League Regular Season Cup
- Puerto Rico Soccer League PlayOff Cup
- Puerto Rico Cup of Excellence

==== Saint Kitts and Nevis ====
===== Leagues =====
- SKNFA Super League: 1st-tier
- SKNFA Division 1: 2nd-tier

===== Cups =====
- Saint Kitts and Nevis National Cup: National cup

==== Saint Lucia ====
===== Leagues =====
- SLFA First Division: 1st-tier
- SLFA Second Division: 2nd-tier

===== Cups =====
- Saint Lucia FA Cup: National cup
- SLFA President's Cup

==== Saint-Martin ====
===== Leagues =====
- Saint-Martin Senior League: 1st-tier

===== Cups =====
- Coupe des Îles du Nord
- Coupe de Saint-Martin

==== Saint Vincent and the Grenadines ====
===== Leagues =====
- Saint Vincent and the Grenadines Football Federation

==== Sint Maarten ====
===== Leagues =====
- Sint Maarten Senior League: 1st-tier

==== Suriname ====
===== Leagues =====
- Suriname Major League: 1st-tier
- SVB Tweede Divisie: 2nd-tier
- SVB Derde Divisie: 3rd-tier

===== Cups =====
- Beker van Suriname: National cup
- Suriname President's Cup: Super cup

==== Turks and Caicos Islands ====
===== Leagues =====
- Provo Premier League: 1st-tier

===== Cups =====
- Turks and Caicos FA Cup

==== Trinidad and Tobago ====
===== Leagues =====
- TT Premier Football League: 1st-tier
- TT Super League: 2nd-tier
- Tobago Premier Division

===== Cups =====
- Trinidad and Tobago FA Trophy: National cup
- Trinidad and Tobago Charity Shield: Super cup
- Trinidad and Tobago League Cup
- Trinidad and Tobago Classic
- Trinidad and Tobago Goal Shield
- Trinidad and Tobago Pro Bowl
- Trinidad and Tobago Super League Cup

==== U.S Virgin Islands ====
===== Leagues =====
- U.S. Virgin Islands Championship: 1st-tier
- St Croix Soccer League: 2nd-tier
- St Thomas League: 2nd-tier

==== United States ====
Outdoor

(United States) Competitions	League/Cup
Major League Soccer	1st-tier league	Each year (March→October). 34 regular-season matches, with each team playing all other teams in its conference home and away, plus some teams in the other conference once. Playoffs: MLS Cup Playoffs and MLS Cup (October→December). Includes three teams from Canada.
USL Championship	2nd-tier league	1st division of the United Soccer League; each year (March→October). 34 regular-season matches, with each team playing all other teams in its conference home and away. Playoffs: USL Championship playoffs, USL Championship Final (October→December).
MLS Next Pro	3rd-tier league	Launched in 2022 with 21 teams, being reserve sides of MLS.
National Independent Soccer Association	3rd-tier league	Abbreviated as NISA
USL League One	3rd-tier league	2nd division of the United Soccer League; began play in 2019. 32-game regular-season (March→October).
National Premier Soccer League	Amateur leagues(National Leagues)	Each year (May→July); Each team plays every other team once; Playoffs (July→August).
NISA Nation	Amateur leagues(National Leagues)
USL League Two	Amateur leagues(National Leagues)	3rd division of the United Soccer League. Each year (May→July); each team plays every other team in its division home and away. Playoffs in July and August. Includes teams from Canada.
United Premier Soccer League Premier Division	Amateur leagues(National Leagues)
USASA Regional Elite Amateur and State Premier Leagues	Amateur leagues(Regional and Local Leagues)
USASA State Leagues	Amateur leagues(Regional and Local Leagues)
United Premier Soccer League Division 1	Amateur leagues(Regional and Local Leagues)
U.S. Open Cup	National cup	Each year (May→September)
MLS All-Star Game	Special competitions
George F. Donnelly Cup	Amateur cup
Hank Steinbrecher Cup	Amateur cup
National Amateur Cup	Amateur cup
MLS Next	Youth-tier leagues	The under-13, under-14, under-15, under-16, under-17 and under-19 age groups.; MLS NEXT Cup will be held in the U-15, U-16, U-17 and U-19 category.
United States Club Soccer	Youth-tier leagues
Super-20 League	Youth-tier leagues	Youth division of the United Soccer League.
Super Y-League	Youth-tier leagues	Youth division of the United Soccer League.
National Women's Soccer League	Women's 1st-tier league	Each year (March→September); each team plays every other team twice; playoffs (October). 2020 season abbreviated due to COVID-19.
United Women's Soccer	Women's 2nd-tier league	Each year (May→July); each team plays every other team at least once; Playoffs (July); also includes one team from Canada.
Women's Premier Soccer League	Women's 2nd-tier league	Each year (May→July); each team plays every other team once; Playoffs (July); Also includes two teams from Canada and Puerto Rico.
United States Adult Soccer Association	Women's Lower-tier leagues
NWSL Challenge Cup	Women's league cup	Each year (April→September)
USASA National Women's Cup	Women's Amateur cup
USASA National Women's Amateur	Women's Amateur cup
US Soccer National Amateur Championships	Women Amateur cup
United Soccer Association; National Professional Soccer League	Defunct 1st-tier leagues	1967, each year;
North American Soccer League (former)	Defunct 1st-tier league	1968–1984, each year;
American Soccer League (1933–83)	Defunct 2nd-tier league	1933–1983, each year;
United Soccer League (former)	Defunct 2nd-tier league	1984–1985, each year;
Western Soccer Alliance	Defunct 2nd-tier league	1985–1989, each year;
American Soccer League (1988–89)	Defunct 2nd-tier league	1988–1989, each year;
American Professional Soccer League	Defunct 2nd-tier league	1990–1996, each year;
A-League	Defunct 2nd-tier league	1995–2004, 1st division of United Soccer Leagues
USL First Division	Defunct 2nd-tier league	2005–2010, 1st division of United Soccer Leagues.
USSF Division 2 Professional League	Defunct 2nd-tier league	2010, each year;
USL Second Division	Defunct 3rd-tier league	1995–2010, 2nd division of United Soccer Leagues.
Women's United Soccer Association	Defunct Women 1st-tier league	2000–2003, each year;
Women's Professional Soccer	Defunct Women 1st-tier league	2007–2012, each year;
Women's Premier Soccer League Elite	Defunct Women 1st-tier league	2012–2013, each year;
USL W-League	Defunct Women 2nd-tier league	1995–2015, 1st women division of United Soccer Leagues

Indoor

(United States) Competitions	League/Cup
Major Arena Soccer League	1st-tier league	Each year (October→March); Each team plays every other team once; Playoffs (March); Also includes two team from Canada and Mexico.
Major Arena Soccer League 2	2nd-tier league	Each year (December→March); Each team plays every other team once; Playoffs (March).
Premier Arena Soccer League	3rd-tier league	Each year (March); Each team plays every other team once; Playoffs (March); Also includes one team from Mexico.
United States Open Cup for Arena Soccer	National Cup
North American Soccer League (1968–1984)	National League	1968–1984, each year;
Major Indoor Soccer League (1978–92)	National League	1978–1992, each year;
Continental Indoor Soccer League	National League	1989–1997, each year;
National Professional Soccer League (1984–2001)	National League	1984–2001, each year;
Major Indoor Soccer League (2001–08)	National League	2001–2008, each year;
Major Indoor Soccer League (2008–14)	National League	2008–2014, each year;
American Indoor Soccer League	National League	2002–2008, each year;
Xtreme Soccer League	National League	2008–2009, each year;

== CONMEBOL (South American competitions) ==
This section lists the competitions ruled by the CONMEBOL (Confederación Sudamericana de Fútbol), or by federations member the CONMEBOL.

=== National teams ===
- CONMEBOL Copa América
- CONMEBOL Preolímpico: Olympic/Under-23 team; Linked with Qualifiers for the Men's Olympic Football Tournament.
- CONMEBOL Sudamericano Sub20
- CONMEBOL Sudamericano Sub17
- CONMEBOL Sudamericano Sub15
- CONMEBOL Copa América Femenina: Women's cup; Linked with Qualifiers for the FIFA Women's World Cup and Women's Olympic Football Tournament.
- CONMEBOL Sudamericano Sub20 Femenino: Women's
- CONMEBOL Sudamericano Sub17 Femenino: Women's
- Pan American Games
- Copa del Pacífico: tournament between Chile and Peru

==== Defunct ====
- Panamerican Championship
- Superclásico de las Américas: tournament between Brazil and Argentina

=== Clubs ===
- CONMEBOL Libertadores: 1st-tier cup ; also referred to as the Copa Libertadores
- CONMEBOL Sudamericana: 2nd-tier cup ; also known as Copa Sudamericana
- CONMEBOL Recopa: Super cup ; also known as Recopa Sudamericana
- CONMEBOL Libertadores Femenina: Women's cup

==== Defunct ====
- Supercopa Libertadores
- Copa Conmebol
- Copa Mercosur
- Copa Merconorte
- Copa Simón Bolívar
- Copa Ganadores de Copa
- Copa Interamericana
- Copa de Oro
- Copa Master de CONMEBOL
- Copa Master de Supercopa
- Copa Iberoamericana
- Intercontinental Champions' Supercup
- South American Championship of Champions
- J.League Cup / Copa Sudamericana Championship
- Intercontinental Cup

=== Domestic ===
==== Argentina ====
(Argentina)	Competitions	League/Cup
^{[Sen.Men]} ^{[L]}	Liga Profesional de Fútbol	1st-tier league	Also known as the Primera División; August→June; each team plays all others once;
^{[Sen.Men]} ^{[L]}	Primera Nacional	2nd-tier league	Twice a year (August→December/January→June); Each team plays every other team once; Playoffs (June)
^{[Sen.Men]} ^{[Cup]}	Copa Argentina	National cup	National Cup with the winner qualifying for the Copa Libertadores
^{[Sen.Men]} ^{[Cup]}	Trofeo de Campeones de la Liga Profesional	National cup	National Cup between the last Primera División Apertura and the last Primera División Clausura champions.
^{[Sen.Men]} ^{[Cup]}	Supercopa Argentina	Super cup	National Supercup between the last Trofeo de Campeones de la Liga Profesional and Copa Argentina champions.
^{[Sen.Men]} ^{[Cup]}	Supercopa Internacional	Super cup	National Supercup between the last Primera División and Trofeo de Campeones de la Liga Profesional champions.
^{[Sen.Women]} ^{[L]}	Campeonato de Fútbol Femenino de Primera División A	Women's 1st-tier league
^{[Sen.Women]} ^{[L]}	Campeonato de Fútbol Femenino de Primera División B	Women's 2nd-tier league
^{[Sen.Women]} ^{[L]}	Campeonato de Fútbol Femenino de Primera División C	Women's 3rd-tier league
^{[Sen.Women]} ^{[Cup]}	Copa Federal de Fútbol Femenino (es)	Women's cup
Clubs directly affiliated to AFA
^{[Sen.Men]} ^{[L]}	Primera B	3rd-tier league	Twice a year (July→December/January→May); Each team plays every other team once; Playoffs (June→July);
^{[Sen.Men]} ^{[L]}	Primera C	4th-tier league	Twice a year (July→November/November→May); Each team plays every other team once; Playoffs (May→June)
^{[Sen.Men]} ^{[L]}	Torneo Promocional Amateur	5th-tier league	Twice a year (July→November/November→April); Each team plays every other team once; Playoffs (April→May)
Clubs indirectly affiliated to AFA
^{[Sen.Men]} ^{[L]}	Torneo Federal A	3rd-tier league	Twice a year (July→December/January→May); Each team plays every other team twice; Playoffs (May→June); 2 groups: Zone A, Zone B
^{[Sen.Men]} ^{[L]}	Torneo Regional Federal	4th-tier league	The contest consists of four rounds. The first, second and third make up the qualifying stage; 8 groups. The winners of each face in the stage or final round paired according to a predetermined scheme, two games, and the four winners get promotion to the Torneo Federal A
^{[Sen.Men]} ^{[L]}	Regional Leagues	5th-tier league

==== Bolivia ====
(Bolivia)	Competitions	League/Cup
^{[Sen.Men]} ^{[L]}	División de Fútbol Profesional	1st-tier league
^{[Sen.Men]} ^{[L]}	Copa Simón Bolívar	2nd-tier league	Also known as the Copa Simón Bolívar Nacional B
^{[Sen.Men]} ^{[L]}	Bolivian Football Regional Leagues (9 regional leagues)	3rd and below tier leagues
^{[Sen.Men]} ^{[L]}	Liga Nacional B	(Defunct 2nd-tier league)
^{[Sen.Men]} ^{[Cup]}	Copa Bolivia	Cup	National Cup with the winner qualifying for the Copa Sudamericana

==== Brazil ====
(Brazil)	Competitions	League/Cup
^{[Sen.Men]} ^{[L]}	Campeonato Brasileiro Série A	Top-tier league
^{[Sen.Men]} ^{[L]}	Campeonato Brasileiro Série B	2nd-tier league
^{[Sen.Men]} ^{[L]}	Campeonato Brasileiro Série C	3rd-tier league	Teams are divided into 2 regional groups. Top 4 of each group advance to the Quarter-finals, with the winners promoted to Série B.
^{[Sen.Men]} ^{[L]}	Campeonato Brasileiro Série D	4th-tier league
^{[Sen.Men]} ^{[Cup]}	Copa do Brasil	Domestic cup	A Knockout-tournament contested by best-placed teams from each of the State Championships, the winners of Copa Verde, the winners of Copa do Nordeste, the top 10 non-qualified teams according to the CBF Rankings and the 7-9 Brazilian clubs contesting the Copa Libertadores.
^{[Sen.Men]} ^{[Cup]}	Supercopa do Brasil	Super cup	Match between the winners of Copa do Brasil and the champions of Série A.
^{[Sen.Men]} ^{[Cup]}	Copa Verde	Regional cup	Contested by teams from the North and Midwest regions.
^{[Sen.Men]} ^{[Cup]}	Copa do Nordeste	Regional cup	Contested by teams from the Northeast region.
^{[Sen.Men]} ^{[Cup]}	Copa Paulista	State cup	Contested by teams from São Paulo state, which do not participate at any Campeonato Brasileiro level; teams from 'Campeonato Brasileiro' can compete using a "B" team.
^{[Sen.Men]} ^{[Cup]}	Copa Centro-Oeste	Regional cup	Contested by teams from Midwest region.
^{[Sen.Men]} ^{[Cup]}	Copa Norte	Regional cup	Contested by teams from North region.
^{[Youth_Men]} ^{[National]}	Campeonato Brasileiro Sub-23	U23 league
^{[Youth_Men]} ^{[National]}	Campeonato Brasileiro Sub-20	U20 league
^{[Youth_Men]} ^{[L]}	Copa do Brasil Sub-20	U20 cup
^{[Youth_Men]} ^{[L]}	Supercopa do Brasil Sub-20	U20 super cup
^{[Youth_Men]} ^{[National]}	Campeonato Brasileiro Sub-17	U17 league
^{[Youth_Men]} ^{[L]}	Copa do Brasil Sub-17	U17 cup
^{[Youth_Men]} ^{[L]}	Supercopa do Brasil Sub-17	U17 super cup
^{[Sen.Women]} ^{[L]}	Campeonato Brasileiro de Futebol Feminino Série A1	Women's 1st-tier league
^{[Sen.Women]} ^{[L]}	Campeonato Brasileiro de Futebol Feminino Série A2	Women's 2nd-tier league
^{[Sen.Women]} ^{[L]}	Campeonato Brasileiro de Futebol Feminino Série A3	Women's 3rd-tier league
^{[Sen.Women]} ^{[Cup]}	Copa do Brasil de Futebol Feminino	Women's cup
^{[Sen.Men]} ^{[Cup]}	Copa Sul-Minas	Regional cup	(Defunct) Contested by teams from South region and Minas Gerais state.
^{[Sen.Men]} ^{[Cup]}	Torneio Rio-São Paulo	Regional cup	(Defunct) Contested by teams from São Paulo and Rio de Janeiro states.
^{[Sen.Men]} ^{[Cup]}	Primeira Liga	Inter-state Cup	(Defunct)
^{[Sen.Men]} ^{[Cup]}	Copa dos Campeões	Inter-state cup	(Defunct).

===== Brazilian states football championships =====
North

- Campeonato Acreano
- Campeonato Amazonense
- Campeonato Roraimense
- Campeonato Paraense
- Campeonato Rondoniense
- Campeonato Tocantinense
- Campeonato Amapaense

Northeast

- Campeonato Baiano
- Campeonato Pernambucano
- Campeonato Alagoano
- Campeonato Sergipano
- Campeonato Potiguar
- Campeonato Maranhense
- Campeonato Piauiense
- Campeonato Cearense
- Campeonato Paraibano

Midwest

- Campeonato Matogrossense
- Campeonato Sul-Matogrossense
- Campeonato Goiano
- Campeonato Brasiliense

Southeast

- Campeonato Paulista
- Campeonato Carioca
- Campeonato Mineiro
- Campeonato Capixaba

South

- Campeonato Gaúcho
- Campeonato Catarinense
- Campeonato Paranaense

==== Chile ====
(Chile)	Competitions	League/Cup
^{[Sen.Men]} ^{[L]}	Liga de Primera	1st-tier league
^{[Sen.Men]} ^{[L]}	Liga de Ascenso	2nd-tier league
^{[Sen.Men]} ^{[L]}	Segunda División	3rd-tier league
^{[Sen.Men]} ^{[L]}	Tercera División A	4th-tier league
^{[Sen.Men]} ^{[L]}	Tercera División B	5th-tier league
^{[Sen.Men]} ^{[Cup]}	Copa Chile	Cup	National Cup with the winner qualifying for the Copa Libertadores
^{[Sen.Men]} ^{[Cup]}	Supercopa de Chile	Super cup	Match between the winners of Copa Chile and the champions of Primera División
^{[Sen.Women]} ^{[L]}	Primera División Femenina	Women's 1st-tier league
^{[Sen.Women]} ^{[L]}	Primera División B Femenina	Women's 2nd-tier league

==== Colombia ====
(Colombia)	Competitions	League/Cup
^{[Sen.Men]} ^{[L]}	Primera A	1st-tier league
^{[Sen.Men]} ^{[L]}	Primera B	2nd-tier league
^{[Sen.Men]} ^{[Cup]}	Copa Colombia	Cup	National Cup with the winner qualifying for the Copa Libertadores
^{[Sen.Men]} ^{[Cup]}	Superliga Colombiana	Super cup	Match between the winners of the Apertura and Finalización tournaments of the Colombian Categoría Primera A.

==== Ecuador ====
(Ecuador)	Competitions	League/Cup
^{[Sen.Men]} ^{[L]}	Serie A	1st-tier league
^{[Sen.Men]} ^{[L]}	Serie B	2nd-tier league
^{[Sen.Men]} ^{[L]}	Segunda Categoría	3rd-tier league
^{[Sen.Men]} ^{[Cup]}	Copa Ecuador	Cup	National Cup with the winner qualifying for the Copa Sudamericana
^{[Sen.Men]} ^{[Cup]}	Supercopa Ecuador	Super cup	Match between the winners of Copa Ecuador and the champions of Serie A

==== Paraguay ====
(Paraguay)	Competitions	League/Cup
^{[Sen.Men]} ^{[L]}	Primera División	1st-tier league
^{[Sen.Men]} ^{[L]}	Segunda División	2nd-tier league
^{[Sen.Men]} ^{[L]}	Tercera División	3rd-tier league	divided into 3 leagues: Primera División B Metropolitana, Paraguayan Primera División B Nacional, Campeonato Nacional de Interligas.
^{[Sen.Men]} ^{[L]}	Cuarta División	4th-tier league	divided into 3 leagues: Primera División C, Primera División C Nacional, Paraguay's regional leagues.
^{[Sen.Men]} ^{[Cup]}	Copa Paraguay	Cup	National Cup with the winner qualifying for the Copa Sudamericana
^{[Sen.Men]} ^{[Cup]}	Supercopa Paraguay	Cup	Match between the winners of Copa Paraguay and the champions of Primera División

==== Peru ====
(Peru)	Competitions	League/Cup
^{[Sen.Men]} ^{[L]}	Liga 1	1st-tier league
^{[Sen.Men]} ^{[L]}	Liga 2	2nd-tier league
^{[Sen.Men]} ^{[L]}	Liga 3	3rd-tier league
^{[Sen.Men]} ^{[L]}	Copa Perú	4th-tier league
^{[Sen.Men]} ^{[L]}	Ligas Departamentales del Perú	5th-tier league
^{[Sen.Men]} ^{[L]}	Ligas Provinciales del Peru	6th-tier league
^{[Sen.Men]} ^{[L]}	Ligas Distritales del Peru	7th-tier league
^{[Sen.Men]} ^{[Cup]}	Copa LFP - FPF	Cup	National Cup with the winner qualifying for the Copa Sudamericana
^{[Sen.Men]} ^{[Cup]}	Copa Bicentenario	Cup	Replaced by the Copa LFP - FPF in 2025
^{[Sen.Men]} ^{[Cup]}	Torneo del Inca	Cup	National Cup with the winner qualifying for the Copa Sudamericana
^{[Sen.Men]} ^{[Cup]}	Supercopa Peruana	Super cup	Match between the winners of Copa Bicentenario and the champions of Liga 1
^{[Sen.Men]} ^{[Cup]}	Copa Federación	Cup	Match between the winners of Torneo del Inca and the champions of Peruvian Primera División
^{[Sen.Men]} ^{[Cup]}	Copa de Campeones del Perú	Cup	Match between the champions of Peruvian Primera División

==== Uruguay ====
(Uruguay)	Competitions	League/Cup
^{[Sen.Men]} ^{[L]}	Primera División	1st-tier league
^{[Sen.Men]} ^{[L]}	Segunda División	2nd-tier league
^{[Sen.Men]} ^{[L]}	Primera División Amateur	3rd-tier league
^{[Sen.Men]} ^{[L]}	Uruguayan Liga Metropolitana Amateur	4th-tier league
^{[Sen.Men]} ^{[Cup]}	Supercopa Uruguaya	Super cup	Match between the winners of Torneo Intermedio and the champions of Primera División
^{[Sen.Men]} ^{[Cup]}	Copa Uruguay	Cup	National Cup with the winner qualifying for the Copa Sudamericana
^{[Sen.Men]} ^{[Cup]}	Torneo Intermedio(Uruguay)	Cup	League Cup with the winner qualifying for the Copa Sudamericana

==== Venezuela ====
(Venezuela)	Competitions	League/Cup
^{[Sen.Men]} ^{[L]}	Primera División	1st-tier league
^{[Sen.Men]} ^{[L]}	Segunda División	2nd-tier league
^{[Sen.Men]} ^{[L]}	Tercera Division	3rd-tier league
^{[Sen.Men]} ^{[Cup]}	Copa Venezuela	Cup	National Cup with the winner qualifying for the Copa Sudamericana

== OFC (Oceanian competitions) ==
This section lists the competitions ruled by the OFC (Oceania Football Confederation), or by federations member the OFC.

=== National teams ===
- OFC Men's Nations Cup
- Pacific Games
- OFC Men's Olympic Qualifier
- OFC U-19 Championship
- OFC U-16 Championship
- OFC Women's Nations Cup: Women's cup; Linked with Qualifiers for the FIFA Women's World Cup and Women's Olympic Football Tournament.
- OFC U-19 Women's Championship: Women's
- OFC U-16 Women's Championship: Women's
- MSG Prime Minister's Cup (revival of Melanesia Cup)

==== Defunct ====
- Wantok Cup
- Polynesia Cup

=== Clubs ===
- OFC Men's Champions League
- OFC Pro League
- OFC Women's Champions League: Women's continental cup

==== Defunct ====
- Oceania Cup Winners' Cup
- OFC President's Cup
- Melanesian Super Cup

=== Domestic ===
==== American Samoa ====
(American Samoa)	Competitions	League/Cup
^{[Sen.Men]} ^{[L]}	ASFA Soccer League	1st-tier league	Each year (October→November); Each team plays every other team once; Playoffs (December); 2 groups: 1 and 2
	FFAS President's Cup	Domestic cup	Each year – knockout competition

==== Cook Islands ====
===== Leagues =====
- Cook Islands Round Cup: 1st-tier

===== Cups =====
- Cook Islands Cup: National cup

==== Fiji ====
===== Leagues =====
- Fiji Premier League: 1st-tier
- Fiji Senior League: 2nd-tier
- Inter-District Championship
- Club Franchise League

===== Cups =====
- FF Cup: National cup
- Fiji Battle of the Giants
- Fiji Champion versus Champion: Super cup
- Girmit Soccer Tournament

==== Kiribati ====
===== Leagues =====
- Kiribati National Championship: 1st-tier

==== New Caledonia ====
===== Leagues =====
- New Caledonia Super Ligue: 1st-tier
- New Caledonia Second Level: 2nd-tier

===== Cups =====
- Coupe de Calédonie: National cup

==== New Zealand ====
(New Zealand)	Competitions	League/Cup
^{[Sen.Men]} ^{[L]}	National League	1st-tier league	Each year (September→December); Each team plays every other team once; Single match playoff final.
^{[Sen.Men]} ^{[L]}	Northern League	2nd-tier league	Each year (March→September); Each team plays every other team twice. Top 4 teams qualify for National League.
^{[Sen.Men]} ^{[L]}	Central League	2nd-tier league	Each year (March→September); Each team plays every other team twice. Top 3 teams qualify for National League.
^{[Sen.Men]} ^{[L]}	Southern League	2nd-tier league	Each year (March→September); Each team plays every other team twice. Top 2 teams qualify for National League.
^{[Sen.Men]} ^{[Cup]}	Chatham Cup	National cup	Each year (April→September); Knockout
^{[Sen.Men]} ^{[Cup]}	Charity Cup	Super cup	Between winners of New Zealand National League and Chatham Cup.
^{[Sen.Women]} ^{[L]}	Women's National League	Women's 1st-tier league	Each year (September→December); Each team plays every other team once; Single match playoff final.
^{[Sen.Women]} ^{[Cup]}	Kate Sheppard Cup	Women's national cup	Each year (April→September); Knockout
Northern Region Football/WaiBOP Football
^{[Sen.Men]} ^{[L]}	NRFL Championship	3rd-tier league	Each year (March/April→September); Each team plays every other team twice.
^{[Sen.Men]} ^{[L]}	NRFL Conference	4th-tier league	Each year (March/April→September); Each team plays every other team twice. Two Conference Northern and Southern
^{[Sen.Men]} ^{[L]}	NRF League One	5th-tier league	Each year (March/April→September); Each team plays every other team twice.
Central Football/Capital Football
^{[Sen.Men]} ^{[L]}	Central League 2	3rd-tier league	Each year (March/April→September); Each team plays every other team twice.
^{[Sen.Men]} ^{[L]}	Central Federation League	4th-tier league	Each year (March/April→September); Each team plays every other team twice. Two Conference Eastern and Western
^{[Sen.Men]} ^{[L]}	Capital Premier	4th-tier league	Each year (March/April→September); Each team plays every other team twice.
^{[Sen.Men]} ^{[Cup]}	Central Federation Cup	Federation cup	Each year (March/April→September); Knockout; Only the teams from Central Football can enter this cup.
Mainland Football/Southern Football
^{[Sen.Men]} ^{[L]}	Canterbury Premiership League	3rd-tier league	Each year (March/April→September); Each team plays every other team twice.
^{[Sen.Men]} ^{[L]}	Nelson Bays Premiership League	3rd-tier league	Each year (March/April→September); Each team plays every other team four times.
^{[Sen.Men]} ^{[L]}	Southern Premiership League	3rd-tier league	Each year (March/April→September); Each team plays every other team twice.
^{[Sen.Men]} ^{[L]}	Canterbury Championship League	4th-tier league	Each year (March/April→September); Each team plays every other team twice.
^{[Sen.Men]} ^{[L]}	South Canterbury Division 1	4th-tier league	Each year (March/April→September); Each team plays every other team four times.
^{[Sen.Men]} ^{[L]}	Fletcher Cup	4th-tier league	Each year (March/April→September); Each team plays every other team twice.
^{[Sen.Men]} ^{[L]}	Donald Gray Memorial Cup	4th-tier league	Each year (March/April→September); Each team plays every other team four times.
^{[Sen.Men]} ^{[Cup]}	English Cup	Federation cup	Each year (April→September); Knockout; Only the teams from Mainland Football can enter this cup.
^{[Sen.Women]} ^{[Cup]}	Reta Fitzpatrick Cup	Women's federation cup	Each year (April→September); Knockout; Only the teams from Mainland Football can enter this cup.

==== Papua New Guinea ====
===== Leagues =====
- Papua New Guinea National Soccer League: 1st-tier
- Papua New Guinea National Club Championship: Amateur division

===== Cups =====
- Papua New Guinea FA Cup: National cup

==== Samoa ====
===== Leagues =====
- Samoa National League: 1st-tier

===== Cups =====
- Samoa Cup: National cup

==== Solomon Islands ====
===== Leagues =====
- Solomon Islands S-League: 1st-tier
- Honiara FA League
- The Solomon Islands Knockout Championship
- Solomon Islands National Club Championship (2000–10)
- Interprovincial Tournament 1977–1985

===== Cups =====
- Solomon Cup: National cup
- Malaita Cup

==== Tahiti ====
===== Leagues =====
- Tahitian Ligue 1: 1st-tier
- Tahitian Ligue 2: 2nd-tier

===== Cups =====
- Tahiti Cup: National cup
- Tahiti Coupe des Champions: Super cup

==== Tonga ====
===== Leagues =====
- Tonga Major League: 1st-tier
- Tonga Division II: 2nd-tier

===== Cups =====
- Tonga Cup: National cup

==== Tuvalu ====
===== Leagues =====
- Tuvalu A-Division League: 1st-tier
- Tuvalu B-Division League: 2nd-tier
- Tuvalu A-Division League (women's)

===== Cups =====
- Taganoa Cup
- NBT Cup: National cup
- Independence Cup
- Christmas Cup
- Tuvalu Games Football Cup

==== Vanuatu ====
===== Leagues =====
- Port Vila Football League
  - Port Vila Premier League: 1st-tier
  - Port Vila First Division: 2nd-tier
  - Port Vila Second Division: 3rd-tier
- VFF National Super League

===== Cups =====
- Port Vila Shield
- Port Vila FA Cup: National cup

== UEFA (European competitions) ==
This section lists the competitions ruled by the UEFA (Union of European Football Associations), or by federations member the UEFA.

=== National teams ===
	Competitions	Teams/Clubs
^{[Sen.Men]} ^{[National]}	UEFA European Championship	National teams	Each 4 years (doubly even years); The individual events are branded in the form of "UEFA Euro [ year ]".
^{[Sen.Men]} ^{[National]}	UEFA Nations League	National teams	Each 2 years (odd years); Linked with entry to the UEFA Euro and the European Qualifiers for the FIFA World Cup. In the top league, League A, the winners of each groups go on to play in the UEFA Nations League Finals.
^{[Sen.Men]} ^{[National]}	Baltic Cup	Sub-continental cup	1928–1940, 1948–1976, 1991–2005, nearly each year; Between the Estonian, Latvian and Lithuanian national teams.
^{[Youth_Men]} ^{[National]}	UEFA Under-21 Championship	U-21 teams	Each 2 years (odd years); Linked with Qualifiers for the Men's Olympic Football Tournament.
^{[Youth_Men]} ^{[National]}	UEFA Under-19 Championship	U-19 teams	Each year (July)
^{[Youth_Men]} ^{[National]}	UEFA Under-17 Championship	U-17 teams	Each year (May)
^{[Sen.Women]} ^{[National]}	UEFA Women's Championship	Women's national teams	Each 4 years (years following doubly even years); The individual events are branded in the form of "UEFA Women's Euro [ year ]".
^{[Sen.Women]} ^{[National]}	UEFA Women's Nations League	Women's national teams	Each 2 years; Linked with entry to the UEFA Women's Championship, FIFA Women's World Cup and Women's Olympic Football Tournament.
^{[Sen.Women]} ^{[National]}	Baltic Women's Cup	Women's sub-continental cup	Between the Estonian, Latvian and Lithuanian women's national teams.
^{[Youth_Women]} ^{[National]}	UEFA Women's Under-19 Championship	Women's U-19 teams	Each year (July)
^{[Youth_Women]} ^{[National]}	UEFA Women's Under-17 Championship	Women's U-17 teams	Each year (May or June)
^{[Futsal]} ^{[National]}	UEFA Futsal Championship	National teams	Each 4 years; The individual events are branded in the form of "UEFA Futsal Euro [ year ]".
^{[Sen.Men]} ^{[National]}	UEFA Amateur Cup	(Defunct National teams)	Each 4 years
^{[Sen.Men]} ^{[National]}	4 Associations' Tournament	(Defunct sub-continental cup)	Each 2 years (odd years) starting in 2011, between the men's national teams of Northern Ireland, the Republic of Ireland, Scotland and Wales; The name of the competition is Nations Cup.
^{[Sen.Men]} ^{[National]}	Balkan Cup	(Defunct sub-continental cup)	1929–1936, 1946–1948; 1973–1980, irregular; Between the national teams from the Balkan region.
^{[Sen.Men]} ^{[National]}	British Home Championship	(Defunct sub-continental cup)	1883–1984, nearly each year; Between the national teams from the United Kingdom.
^{[Sen.Men]} ^{[National]}	Central European International Cup	(Defunct sub-continental cup)	1927–1960, irregular; Between 5 or 6 Central European national teams.
^{[Sen.Men]} ^{[National]}	Nordic Football Championship	(Defunct sub-continental cup)	1924–1983, 2000–2001, each 4 years; Between the national teams from Scandinavia.

=== Clubs ===
	Competitions	Teams/Clubs
^{[Sen.Men]} ^{[Cup]}	UEFA Super Cup	Super cup	Each year (August); Between UEFA Champions League and UEFA Europa League winners.
^{[Sen.Men]} ^{[Cup]}	UEFA Champions League	1st-tier cup	Each year (September→May); once known as European Champion Clubs' Cup .
^{[Sen.Men]} ^{[Cup]}	UEFA Europa League	2nd-tier cup	Each year (September→May); From 1971 to 2009, known as UEFA Cup.
^{[Sen.Men]} ^{[Cup]}	UEFA Conference League	3rd-tier cup	Each year (September→May); From 2021–22 to 2023–24 season, known as UEFA Europe Conference League.
^{[Sen.Men]} ^{[Cup]}	UEFA Regions' Cup	Amateur teams' tournament	Each 2 years (odd years); The previous competition was for representative amateur national teams.
	FENIX Trophy	semi-professional and amateur clubs
^{[Sen.Men]} ^{[Cup]}	Livonia Cup	Sub-continental cup	Each year (January); Between the Estonian and Latvian champions.
^{[Sen.Men]} ^{[Cup]}	Champions Cup (All-Ireland)	Sub-continental cup	inaugurated in 2019; Super cup between the league champions from League of Ireland Premier Division from Ireland and the NIFL Premiership from Northern Ireland
^{[Youth_Men]} ^{[Cup]}	UEFA Youth League	U-19 cup
^{[Sen.Women]} ^{[Cup]}	UEFA Women's Champions League	Women's continental cup	Each year (August→May); From 2001 to 2009, Known as UEFA Women's Cup.
^{[Futsal]} ^{[Cup]}	UEFA Futsal Champions League	1st-tier futsal cup	Each year
^{[Sen.Men]} ^{[Cup]}	UEFA Intertoto Cup	(Defunct 3rd-tier cup)	Each year (June→July); 2008 was the last tournament.
^{[Sen.Men]} ^{[Cup]}	UEFA Cup Winners' Cup	(Defunct level 1-Major cup – Continental cup)	1960–1999, each year
^{[Sen.Men]} ^{[Cup]}	Intercontinental Cup	(Defunct trans-continental cup)	1960–2004, each year; Between UEFA and CONMEBOL.
^{[Sen.Men]} ^{[Cup]}	Baltic League	(Defunct sub-continental cup)	Each year (March→November); Between 4 Estonian, 4 Latvian and 4 Lithuanian clubs.
^{[Sen.Men]} ^{[Cup]}	Royal League	(Defunct sub-continental cup)	2004–2007 (November→April); Between 4 Danish, 4 Norwegian and 4 Swedish clubs.
^{[Sen.Men]} ^{[Cup]}	Setanta Sports Cup	(Defunct sub-continental cup)	2005–2014 annually (February→October); Between 6 Irish and 6 Northern Irish clubs.
^{[Sen.Men]} ^{[Cup]}	Blaxnit Cup	(Defunct sub-continental cup)	1967–1974, each 2 years; Between 4 Irish and 4 Northern Irish clubs.
^{[Sen.Men]} ^{[Cup]}	Inter-Cities Fairs Cup	(Defunct continental cup)	1955–1971, each year
^{[Sen.Men]} ^{[Cup]}	Balkans Cup	(Defunct sub-continental cup)	1960–1994, nearly each year; Between clubs from the Balkan region.
^{[Sen.Men]} ^{[Cup]}	Latin Cup	(Defunct sub-continental cup)	1949–1957, nearly each year; Between the French, Italian, Portuguese and Spanish.
^{[Sen.Men]} ^{[Cup]}	Mitropa Cup	(Defunct sub-continental cup)	1927–1939, 1951–1992, nearly each year; Between central European clubs champions.
^{[Sen.Men]} ^{[Cup]}	Anglo-Italian Cup	(Defunct sub-continental cup)	1970–1973; 1976–1986; 1993–1996; Between Italian and English teams.

=== Domestic ===
==== Albania ====
(Albania)	Competitions	League/Cup
^{[Sen.Men]} ^{[L]}	Kategoria Superiore	1st-tier league	Each year (August→May); Each team plays every other team twice
^{[Sen.Men]} ^{[L]}	Kategoria e Parë	2nd-tier league	Each year (September→May); Each team plays every other team twice
^{[Sen.Men]} ^{[L]}	Kategoria e Dytë	3rd-tier league	2 groups: A and B
^{[Sen.Men]} ^{[L]}	Kategoria e Tretë	4th-tier league
^{[Sen.Men]} ^{[Cup]}	Superkupa e Shqipërisë	Super cup	Each year (August); Between Kategoria Superiore and Kupa e Shqipërisë winners
^{[Sen.Men]} ^{[Cup]}	Kupa e Shqipërisë	National cup	Each year (September→May)
^{[Youth_Men]} ^{[L]}	Albanian U-19 Superliga	U-19 1st-tier league
^{[Youth_Men]} ^{[L]}	Albanian U-19 First Division	U-19 2nd-tier league
^{[Youth_Men]} ^{[L]}	Albanian U-17 Superliga	U-17 1st-tier league
^{[Youth_Men]} ^{[L]}	Albanian U-17 First Division	U-17 2nd-tier league
^{[Sen.Women]} ^{[L]}	Albanian women's football championship	Women 1st-tier league	Each year
^{[Sen.Women]} ^{[Cup]}	Albanian Women's Cup	Women National cup	Each year
^{[Futsal]} ^{[L]}	Albanian Futsal Championship	Futsal 1st-tier league
^{[Futsal]} ^{[Cup]}	Albanian Futsal Cup	Futsal National cup

==== Andorra ====
(Andorra)	Competitions	League/Cup
^{[Sen.Men]} ^{[L]}	Primera Divisió	1st-tier league	Each year (September→March); Each team plays every other team twice; Playoffs (March→April)
^{[Sen.Men]} ^{[L]}	Segona Divisió	2nd-tier league	Each year (September→April); Each team plays every other team twice; Playoffs (March→April)
^{[Sen.Men]} ^{[Cup]}	Andorran Supercup	Super cup	Each year (September); Between Campionat de Lliga and Copa Constitució winners
^{[Sen.Men]} ^{[Cup]}	Copa Constitució	National cup	Each year (January→May)

==== Armenia ====
(Armenia)	Competitions	League/Cup
^{[Sen.Men]} ^{[L]}	Armenian Premier League	1st-tier league	Each year (April→November); Each team plays every other team four times
^{[Sen.Men]} ^{[L]}	Armenian First League	2nd-tier league	Each year (April→November); Each team plays every other team three times
^{[Sen.Men]} ^{[Cup]}	Armenian Supercup	Super cup	Each year (May); Between Armenian Premier League and Armenian Cup winners
^{[Sen.Men]} ^{[Cup]}	Armenian Cup	National cup	Each year (September→May)

==== Austria ====
(Austria)	Competitions	League/Cup
^{[Sen.Men]} ^{[L]}	Bundesliga	1st-tier league	Each year (July→December/February→May); Each team plays every other team four times
^{[Sen.Men]} ^{[L]}	2. Liga	2nd-tier league	Each year (July→May); Each team plays every other team three times
^{[Sen.Men]} ^{[L]}	Austrian Regionalliga	3rd-tier league	Each year (July→June); Each team plays every other team twice; 3 groups: Central, East and West
^{[Sen.Men]} ^{[L]}	Austrian Landesliga	4th-tier league	9 groups: Vorarlberg, Tirol, Salzburg, Oberösterreich, Steiermark, Kärnten, Niederösterreich, Wien and Burgenland
^{[Sen.Men]} ^{[L]}	Austrian 2. Landesliga	5th-tier league
^{[Sen.Men]} ^{[Cup]}	ÖFB-Cup	National cup	Each year (July→May)
^{[Sen.Men]} ^{[Cup]}	ÖFB-Supercup	Super cup	1986–2004, each year; Between ÖFB:Bundesliga and ÖFB-Cup winners
^{[Sen.Men]} ^{[Cup]}	Niederösterreichischer Landespokal	Lower cup

==== Azerbaijan ====
(Azerbaijan)	Competitions	League/Cup
^{[Sen.Men]} ^{[L]}	Azerbaijan Premier League	1st-tier league	Each year (August→May); Each team plays every other team twice
^{[Sen.Men]} ^{[L]}	Azerbaijan First Division	2nd-tier league	Each year (August→April); Each team plays every other team twice; Playoffs (April→June); 2 groups: A and B
^{[Sen.Men]} ^{[L]}	Azerbaijan Regional League	3rd-tier league
^{[Sen.Men]} ^{[L]}	AFFA Amateur League	Amateur League
^{[Sen.Men]} ^{[Cup]}	Azerbaijan Cup	National cup	Each year (September→May)
^{[Sen.Men]} ^{[Cup]}	Azerbaijan Supercup	Super cup	Between Azerbaijan Premier League and Azerbaijan Cup winners

==== Belarus ====
(Belarus) Competitions	League/Cup
Belarusian Premier League	1st-tier league
Belarusian First League	2nd-tier league
Belarusian Second League	3rd-tier league
Belarus regional league	Regional league
Belarusian Cup	National cup
Belarusian Super Cup	Super cup	Between Belarusian Premier League and Belarusian Cup winners

==== Belgium ====
(Belgium) Competitions	League/Cup
Belgian Pro League	1st-tier league	known as the 1A Pro League
Challenger Pro League	2nd-tier league	previously known as the 1B Pro League
Belgian National Division 1	3rd-tier league
Belgian Division 2	4th-tier league	3 groups: Flemish A, Flemish B, Francophone A
Belgian Division 3	5th-tier league	4 groups: Flemish A, Flemish B, Francophone A, Francophone B
Belgian Provincial Leagues	Lower-tier leagues	10 regional league systems: West Flanders, East Flanders, Antwerp, Limburg, Brabant & Brussels (Flemish speaking clubs), Brabant & Brussels (French speaking clubs), Hainaut, Namur, Luxembourg and Liège
Belgian Cup	National cup
Belgian Super Cup	Super cup	known as the Pro League Supercup; Between Belgian First Division A and Belgian Cup winners

==== Bosnia and Herzegovina ====
(Bosnia and Herzegovina) Competitions	League/Cup
Premier League of Bosnia and Herzegovina	1st-tier league
Prva Liga Federacija Bosne i Hercegovine	2nd-tier league
First League of the Republika Srpska	2nd-tier league
Druga Liga Federacija Bosne i Hercegovine	3rd-tier league	4 groups: Sjever, Centar, Jug, Zapad
Druga Liga Republike Srpske	3rd-tier league	2 groups: Istok, Zapad
Prva Liga TK	4th-tier league	4 groups and 2 groups
Druga Liga TK	5th-tier league	3 groups: Zapad, Sjever and Jug
Kup Bosne i Hercegovine	National cup
Kup Federacija Bosne i Hercegovine	Sub-national cup
Kup Federacija Republike Srpske	Sub-national cup
Bosnian Supercup	Super cup (discontinued)	Between Premier League of Bosnia and Herzegovina and Kup Bosne i Hercegovine winners
First League of Herzeg-Bosnia	Defunct League	1993–2000: Croatian clubs in Bosnia and Herzegovina

==== Bulgaria ====
(Bulgaria) Competitions	League/Cup
Bulgarian First League	1st-tier league
Bulgarian Second League	2nd-tier league
Bulgarian Third Amateur Football League	3rd-tier league	4 groups: North-West, North-East, South-West and South-East
Bulgarian Regional Football Groups	4th/5th-tier leagues	4th-tier:41 A groups 5th-tier:17 B groups
Bulgarian Army Championship	amateur league	Army teams
Bulgarian Student Championship	amateur league	Student teams
Bulgarian Cup	National cup	Divided in two phases – the Qualification phase and the Final phase.
Bulgarian Supercup	Super cup	Between Bulgarian A Professional Football Group and Bulgarian Cup winners
Bulgarian Amateur Football League cup	Amateur cup	Teams from V AFG and Regional Leagues
Bulgarian Village Championship	Defunct amateur league	Village teams, 1951–1984, 2006, each year
Bulgarian Railway-man's Championship	Defunct amateur league	Railway-man's teams
Bulgarian State Championship	Defunct 1st-tier league cup	1924–1938, 1940–1944, each year
Bulgarian National Football Division	Defunct 1st-tier league	1938–1940, each year
Bulgarian Republican Championship	Defunct 1st-tier league cup	1944–1948, each year
Bulgarian Premier League	Defunct 1st-tier league	2000–2003, each year
Bulgarian Second League	Defunct 2nd-tier league	2000–2001, each year
Bulgarian First League	Defunct 2nd-tier league	2001–2003, each year
Bulgarian Tsar's Cup	Defunct national cup	1924–1944, each year
Soviet Army Cup	Defunct national cup (until 1982)	1946–1990, each year
Bulgarian Football Union Cup	Defunct cup	1990–1991, once
Bulgarian Profesional Football League Cup	Defunct League cup	1994–1997, each year
Bulgarian Women Championship	1st-tier women league	Women teams

==== Croatia ====
(Croatia) Competitions	League/Cup
HNL	1st-tier league
Prva NL	2nd-tier league
Druga NL	3rd-tier league
Treća NL	4th-tier league	5 groups: Center, East, North, South and West
Inter-County Football Leagues / First County Football League	5th/6th-tier league	up to 21 groups
Hrvatski nogometni kup	National cup
Croatian Football Super Cup	Super cup	Between HNL and Hrvatski nogometni kup winners
Croatian Regional Cup	Regional cup
Eternal derby	Derby	Between Hajduk Split and Dinamo Zagreb

==== Cyprus ====
(Cyprus) Competitions	League/Cup
Cypriot First Division	1st-tier league
Cypriot Second Division	2nd-tier league
Cypriot Third Division	3rd-tier league
Cypriot Fourth Division	4th-tier league
Cypriot Cup	1st and 2nd division cup
Cypriot Cup for lower divisions	3rd and 4th division cup
Cyprus FA Shield	Super cup	Between Cypriot First Division and Cypriot Cup winners

==== Czech Republic ====
(Czech Republic) Competitions	League/Cup
Czech First League	1st-tier league
Czech National League	2nd-tier league
Bohemian Football League	3rd-tier league
Moravian–Silesian Football League	3rd-tier league
Czech Fourth Division	4th-tier league	6 groups: A, B, C, D, E and F
Regional Championship	5th-tier league
Prague Championship	5th-tier league
Football I. A class	6th-tier league
Football I. B class	7th-tier league
Football II. class	8th-tier league
Prague II. class	8th-tier league
Football III. class	9th-tier league
Football IV. class	10th-tier league
Czech Cup	National cup
Czech Supercup	Super cup	Between Czech First League and Czech Cup winners
Tipsport liga	Annual winter football tournament	For clubs from the Czech Republic and occasionally surrounding countries
Women's Czech First Division	Women's 1st-tier league
Czech Women's Cup	Women's national cup

==== Denmark ====
(Denmark) Competitions	League/Cup
Danish Superliga	1st-tier league
Danish 1st Division	2nd-tier league
Danish 2nd Division	3rd-tier league	1 group. From 2021 to 2022 (2 groups. until 2020–21)
Danish 3rd Division	4th-tier league	1 group. From 2021 to 2022
Denmark Series	5th-tier league	4 groups. From 2021 to 2022
Danish Cup	National cup
Danish League Cup	(Defunct league cup)
The Football Tournament	(Defunct league)	1889–1903
Baneklubberne Tournaments	(Defunct league)	1911
Copenhagen football champions	(Defunct league)	1903–1936
Copenhagen Cup	(Defunct cup)	1910–1953
Danish Supercup	(Defunct cup)	1994–2004
Fionia Bank Cup	(Defunct cup)	2006
Viasat Cup	(Defunct cup)	2006
Elitedivisionen	Women's 1st-tier league
Kvinde 1. division	Women's 2nd -tier league
Danish Women's Cup	Women's national cup

==== England ====
(England)	Competitions	League/Cup
^{[Sen.Men]} ^{[L]}	Premier League	1st-tier league	The English Premier League (EPL for short) is sometimes used to distinguish it from the Premier League in other countries.
^{[Sen.Men]} ^{[L]}	EFL Championship	2nd-tier league	1st division of English Football League
^{[Sen.Men]} ^{[L]}	EFL League One	3rd-tier league	2nd division of English Football League
^{[Sen.Men]} ^{[L]}	EFL League Two	4th-tier league	3rd division of English Football League
^{[Sen.Men]} ^{[L]}	National League	5th/6th-tier leagues	5th-tier: National League; 6th-tier: National League North and National League South
^{[Sen.Men]} ^{[L]}	Northern Premier League	7th/8th-tier leagues	7th-tier: Premier Division; 8th-tier: Division One East and Division One West
^{[Sen.Men]} ^{[L]}	Southern Football League	7th/8th-tier leagues	7th-tier: Premier Division; 8th-tier: Division One Midlands and Division One South & West
^{[Sen.Men]} ^{[L]}	Isthmian League	7th/8th-tier leagues	7th-tier: Premier Division; 8th-tier: Division One North and Division One South
^{[Sen.Men]} ^{[L]}	Several interconnected sub-regional leagues	9th/10th-tier leagues	9th-tier: Combined Counties League Premier Division North, Combined Counties League Premier Division South, Eastern Counties League Premier Division, Essex Senior League, Hellenic League Premier Division, Midland League Premier Division, North West Counties League Premier Division, Northern Counties East League Premier Division, Northern League Division One, Southern Combination League Premier Division, Southern Counties East League Premier Division, Spartan South Midlands League Premier Division, United Counties League Premier Division North, United Counties League Premier Division South, Wessex League Premier Division, Western League Premier Division; 10th-tier: Combined Counties League Division One, Eastern Counties League Division One North, Eastern Counties League Division One South, Hellenic League Division One, Midland League Division One, North West Counties League Division One North, North West Counties League Division One South, Northern Counties East League Division One, Northern League Division Two, South West Peninsula League Premier Division East, South West Peninsula League Premier Division West, Southern Combination Football League Division One, Southern Counties East League Division One, Spartan South Midlands League Division One, United Counties League Division One, Wessex League Division One, Western League Division One
^{[Sen.Men]} ^{[L]}	Several regional/county feeder leagues	11th-tier leagues	11th-tier: Anglian Combination Premier Division, Bedfordshire County League Premier Division, Cambridgeshire County League Premier Division, Central Midlands Alliance Premier Division North, Central Midlands Alliance Premier Division South, Cheshire League Premier Division, Devon Football League, Essex Alliance League, Essex & Suffolk Border League Premier Division, Essex Olympian League Premier Division, Gloucestershire County League, Hampshire Premier League, Herefordshire football League Premier Division, Hertfordshire Senior County League Premier Division, Humber Premier League Premier Division, Isle of Wight Saturday League Division One, Kent County League Premier Division, Leicestershire Senior League Premier Division, Lincolnshire League, Liverpool County Premier League Premier Division, Manchester League Premier Division, Mid-Sussex League Premier Division, Middlesex County League Premier Division, Midland League Division Two, Northamptonshire Combination League Premier Division, Northern Alliance Premier Division, North Riding League Premier Division, Nottinghamshire Senior League Senior Division, Oxfordshire Senior League Premier Division, Peterborough & District League Premier Division, Sheffield & Hallamshire County Senior League Premier Division, Shropshire County Football League Premier Division, Shropshire County Football League Premier Division, Somerset County League Premier Division, Southern Combination League Division Two, Spartan South Midlands League Division Two, St Piran League Premier Division East, St Piran League Premier Division West, Staffordshire County Senior League Premier Division, Suffolk & Ipswich League Senior Division, Surrey Premier County Football League, Thames Valley Premier League Premier Division, Wearside League Premier Division, West Cheshire League Division One, West Lancashire League Premier Division, West Midlands (Regional) League Division One, West Yorkshire League Premier Division, Wiltshire Senior League Premier Division, York League Premier Division, Yorkshire Amateur League Supreme Division
^{[Sen.Men]} ^{[Cup]}	FA Cup	National cup
^{[Sen.Men]} ^{[Cup]}	EFL Cup	League cup	Only the teams from Premier League and English Football League can enter this cup
^{[Sen.Men]} ^{[Cup]}	FA Community Shield	Super cup	Between winners of Premier League and FA Cup
^{[Sen.Men]} ^{[Cup]}	EFL Trophy	Lower cup	Only the teams from EFL League One, EFL League Two, and academy teams of the EFL Championship and Premier League can enter this cup
^{[Sen.Men]} ^{[Cup]}	FA Trophy	Lower cup	Only the teams from the 5th, the 6th, the 7th and the 8th-tier leagues can enter this cup
^{[Sen.Men]} ^{[Cup]}	FA Vase	Lower cup	Only the teams from the 9th-tier and lower leagues can enter this cup
^{[Sen.Men]} ^{[Cup]}	FA Inter-League Cup	Lower cup	Representative teams of leagues at the 11th-tier and lower can enter this cup
^{[Sen.Men]} ^{[Cup]}	County Cup	Lower cup	organised by county football associations.
^{[Men]} ^{[L]}	Premier League 2	U21 league	Until 2015–16 season, known as the U21 Premier League
^{[Men]} ^{[L]}	Professional Development League	U21 league	Until 2015–16 season, known as the U21 Professional Development League 2
^{[Men]} ^{[Cup]}	National League Cup	Lower cup	Competition abolished in 2009, brought back in 2024 including Premier League 2 teams
^{[Men]} ^{[Cup]}	Premier League International Cup	U23 international cup	English football competition for U23 players from across Europe
^{[Men]} ^{[Cup]}	Premier League Cup	U23 cup	Until 2015–16 season, known as the U21 Premier League Cup
^{[Men]} ^{[L]}	U18 Premier League	U18 league
^{[Men]} ^{[L]}	U18 Professional Development League	U18 league
^{[Men]} ^{[Cup]}	FA Youth Cup	U18 cup
^{[Sen.Women]} ^{[L]}	Women's Super League	Women's 1st-tier league	Until 2021–22 season, known as the FA Women's Super League
^{[Sen.Women]} ^{[L]}	FA Women's Championship	Women's 2nd-tier league	Until 2017–18 season, known as the FA Women's Super League 2
^{[Sen.Women]} ^{[L]}	FA Women's National League	Women's 3rd/4th-tier leagues	3rd-tier: National Division; 4th-tier: Northern Division and Southern Division
^{[Sen.Women]} ^{[Cup]}	Women's FA Cup	Women's national cup
^{[Sen.Women]} ^{[Cup]}	FA Women's League Cup	Women's league cup
^{[Sen.Women]} ^{[Cup]}	FA Women's National League Cup	Women's lower cup	Only the teams from FA Women's National League plus the four regional Division One leagues can enter this cup.
^{[Sen.Women]} ^{[Cup]}	Women's FA Community Shield	Women's Super cup	Between winners of Women's Super League and Women's FA Cup

==== Estonia ====
===== Leagues =====
- ^{[Sen.Men]} ^{[L]} Meistriliiga: Men's 1st-tier league
- ^{[Sen.Men]} ^{[L]} Esiliiga: Men's 2nd-tier league
- ^{[Sen.Men]} ^{[L]} Esiliiga B: Men's 3rd-tier league
- ^{[Sen.Men]} ^{[L]} II liiga: Men's 4th-tier league
- ^{[Sen.Men]} ^{[L]} III liiga: Men's 5th-tier league
- ^{[Sen.Men]} ^{[L]} IV liiga: Men's 6th-tier league
- ^{[Sen.Women]} ^{[L]} Naiste Meistriliiga: Women's 1st-tier league

===== Cups =====
- ^{[Sen.Men]} ^{[L]} Estonian Cup: Men's National cup
- ^{[Sen.Men]} ^{[L]} Estonian Supercup: Men's super cup
- ^{[Sen.Men]} ^{[L]} Estonian Small Cup: Men's lower league cup
- ^{[Sen.Women]} ^{[Cup]} Estonian Women's Cup: Women's National cup

==== Faroe Islands ====
===== Leagues =====
- Faroe Islands Premier League: 1st-tier
- 1. Deild: 2nd-tier
- 2. Deild: 3rd-tier
- 3. Deild: 4th-tier
- 1. delid kvinnur: Women's league

===== Cups =====
- Faroe Islands Cup: National cup
- Faroe Islands Super Cup: Super cup
- FSF Trophy: defunct
- Faroese Women's Cup
- Faroese Women's Super Cup

==== Finland ====
(Finland) Competitions	League/Cup
Veikkausliiga	1st-level league
Ykkönen	2nd-level league
Kakkonen	3rd-level league
Kolmonen	4th-level league
Nelonen	5th-level league
Finnish Cup	National cup
Finnish League Cup	League cup

==== France ====
(France) Competitions	League/Cup
Ligue 1	1st-level league	Ruled by the Ligue de Football Professionnel
Ligue 2	2nd-level league	Ruled by the Ligue de Football Professionnel
Ligue 3	3rd-level league	Ruled by the Ligue de Football Professionnel
National 1	4th-level league	Semi-professional league: 3 groups of 16
National 2	5th-level league	Semi-professional league: 8 groups of 14
Régional 1	6th-level league
Coupe de France	National cup
Trophée des Champions	Super cup	Between Ligue 1 and Coupe de France winners
Coupe de la Ligue	(Defunct league cup)	1994–2020; Ruled by the Ligue de Football Professionnel
Championnat National U19	U-19 league
Coupe Gambardella	U-19 cup
Championnat National U17	U-17 league
Division 1 Féminine	Women 1st-level league
Division 2 Féminine	Women 2nd-level league
Coupe de France féminine	Women's national cup

==== Georgia ====
===== Leagues =====
- Erovnuli Liga: 1st-tier
- Erovnuli Liga 2: 2nd-tier
- Georgian Liga 3: 3rd-tier
- Liga 4: 4th-tier
- Regionuli Liga: 5th-tier
- Women's football championship

===== Cups =====
- Georgian Cup: National cup
- Georgian Super Cup: Super cup

==== Germany ====
(Germany)	Competitions	League/Cup
^{[Sen.Men]} ^{[L]}	Bundesliga	1st-tier league	Each year (August→May); Each team plays every other team twice
^{[Sen.Men]} ^{[L]}	2. Bundesliga	2nd-tier league	Each year (August→May); Each team plays every other team twice
^{[Sen.Men]} ^{[L]}	3. Liga	3rd-tier league	Each year (July→May); Each team plays every other team twice
^{[Sen.Men]} ^{[L]}	Regionalliga	4th-tier league	Each year (August→June); Each team plays every other team twice; 5 groups: Nord, Nordost, West, Südwest and Bayern
^{[Sen.Men]} ^{[L]}	Oberliga	5th-tier league	14 groups: Schleswig-Holstein, Hamburg, Bremen, Niedersachsenliga, Nordost-Nord, Nordost-Süd, Westfalen, Südwest, Hessen, Baden-Württemberg, Bayernliga North, Bayernliga South, Mittelrhein and Niederrhein
^{[Sen.Men]} ^{[L]}	Landesliga	6th/7th/8th-tier leagues
^{[Sen.Men]} ^{[L]}	Verbandsliga	6th/7th-tier leagues
^{[Sen.Men]} ^{[L]}	Gruppenliga	7th-tier leagues
^{[Sen.Men]} ^{[L]}	Bezirksliga	7th/8th/9th-tier leagues
^{[Sen.Men]} ^{[L]}	Kreisliga	From 8th to 14th-tier leagues
^{[Sen.Men]} ^{[Cup]}	DFB-Pokal	National cup	Each year (August→May)
^{[Sen.Men]} ^{[Cup]}	Verbandspokal	Regional cup (Association Cup)
^{[Sen.Men]} ^{[Cup]}	Franz Beckenbauer Supercup	Super cup	Each year; Between Bundesliga and DFB Pokal winners; From 1987 to 1996, known as DFB-Supercup, and from 1997 to 2024, was known as the DFL-Supercup. Since 2025, known by its current name.
^{[Youth_Men]} ^{[L]}	Under 19 Bundesliga	Under-19 league	German: A-Junioren Bundesliga
^{[Youth_Men]} ^{[L]}	Under 17 Bundesliga	Between the ages of 15 and 17 league
^{[Sen.Women]} ^{[L]}	Frauen-Bundesliga	Women's 1st-tier league	Each year (September→May); Each team plays every other team twice
^{[Sen.Women]} ^{[L]}	2. Frauen-Bundesliga	Women's 2nd-tier league
^{[Sen.Women]} ^{[L]}	Frauen-Regionalliga	Women's 3rd-tier league
^{[Sen.Women]} ^{[Cup]}	DFB-Pokal Frauen	Women's national cup
^{[Sen.Women]} ^{[Cup]}	Frauen Verbandspokal	Women's regional cup
^{[Sen.Men]} ^{[L]}	Gauliga	National league	1934–1945, each year; Third Reich
^{[Sen.Men]} ^{[L]}	DDR-Oberliga	National league	1947–1991, nearly each year; East Germany, before the reunification
^{[Sen.Men]} ^{[Cup]}	FDGB-Pokal	National cup	1949–1991, nearly each year; East Germany, before the reunification
^{[Sen.Men]} ^{[Cup]}	DFL-Ligapokal	Defunct national cup	Nearly each year (June→August)

==== Gibraltar ====
===== Leagues =====
- Gibraltar Football League: 1st-tier
- Gibraltar Premier Division: defunct
- Gibraltar Second Division: defunct
- Gibraltar Intermediate League
- Gibraltar women's football championship

===== Cups =====
- Rock Cup: National cup
- Pepe Reyes Cup: Super cup
- Gibraltar Division 2 Cup: defunct
- Gibraltar Intermediate Cup
- Gibraltar Premier Cup: defunct
- Women's Rock Cup

==== Greece ====
(Greece) Competitions	League/Cup
Super League 1	1st-tier league
Super League 2	2nd-tier league
Gamma Ethniki	3rd-tier league
Hellenic Amateur Divisions (local championships)	4th/below-tier league
Football League Greece	(Defunct 3rd-tier league)
Delta Ethniki	(Defunct league)
Greek Cup	National cup	Commonly known as the Kypello Elladas
Cup of Friendship and Solidarity	Super cup	Between winners of Super League 1 and Greek Cup
Greek Football Amateur Cup	Lower cup
Amateurs' Super Cup Greece	Lower super cup
Greek League Cup	(Defunct cup)
Gamma Ethniki Cup	(Defunct cup)
Greek A Division (women's football)	Women's league
Greek Women's Cup	Women's cup

==== Hungary ====
===== Leagues =====
- NBI: 1st-tier
- NBII: 2nd-tier
- NBIII: 3rd-tier
- Megyei Bajnokság I: 4th-tier
- Megyei Bajnokság II: 5th-tier
- Női NB I: Women's league

===== Cups =====
- Magyar Kupa: National cup
- Szuperkupa: Super cup
- Hungarian Women's Cup

==== Iceland ====
===== Leagues =====
- Men's
  - Besta deild karla: 1st-tier
  - 1. deild karla: 2nd-tier
  - 2. deild karla: 3rd-tier
  - 3. deild karla: 4th-tier
  - 4. deild karla: 5th-tier
- Women's
  - Besta deild kvenna
  - 1. deild kvenna
  - 2. deild kvenna

===== Cups =====
- Men's
  - Icelandic Men's Football Cup: National cup
  - Icelandic Men's Football Super Cup: Super cup
  - Icelandic Men's Football League Cup: Pre-season cup
  - Fótbolti.net Cup: Annual pre-season tournament
  - Reykjavik Tournament: Annual pre-season tournament
- Women's
  - Icelandic Women's Football Cup
  - Icelandic Women's Super Cup
  - Icelandic Women's Football League Cup

==== Israel ====
===== Leagues =====
- Men
  - Ligat Ha`Al: the top division operates at the national level and has 14 member clubs
  - Liga Leumit: the 2nd division operates at the national level and has 16 member clubs
  - Liga Alef: the 3rd division is split into 2 regional leagues (north and south) and has 32 member clubs (16 in each division)
  - Liga Bet: the 4th division is split into 4 regional leagues (2 in the north, 2 in the south) and has 64 member clubs (16 in each division)
  - Liga Gimel: the 5th division is split into 6 regional leagues and has 94 member clubs
- Women
  - Ligat Nashim Rishona: the top division operates at the national level and has 8 member clubs
  - Ligat Nashim Shniya: the 2nd division operates at the national level and has 5 member clubs
- Youth
  - Noar Premier League: the top division operates at the national level and has 16 member clubs
  - Noar Leumit League: the 2nd division is split into 2 regional leagues (north and south).
  - Noar Arzit: the 3rd division is split into 2 regional leagues (north and south).

===== Cups =====
- Men
  - Israel State Cup: National cup
  - Israel Super Cup: Super cup
  - Toto Cup: one for each of the top 2 divisions. (Ligat Ha`Al and Liga Leumit)
- Women
  - Israeli Women's Cup
- Youth
  - Israel Noar State Cup

==== Italy ====
(Italy) Competitions	League/Cup
Serie A	1st-tier league	Organising body: Lega Serie A; formerly Lega Nazionale Professionisti
Serie B	2nd-tier league	Organising body: Lega B
Serie C	3rd-tier league	Organising body: Lega Italiana Calcio Professionistico; 3 divisions (3 division winners of Serie C will compete in the Supercoppa Serie C); formerly Lega Pro Prima Divisione & Lega Pro Seconda Divisione
Serie D	4th-tier league	9 divisions; interregional committee: Lega Nazionale Dilettanti
Eccellenza	5th-tier league	Regional committees: Lega Nazionale Dilettanti
Promozione	6th-tier league	Regional committees: Lega Nazionale Dilettanti
Prima Categoria	7th-tier league	Regional committees: Lega Nazionale Dilettanti
Seconda Categoria	8th-tier league	Regional committees: Lega Nazionale Dilettanti
Terza Categoria	9th-tier league	Provincial committees: Lega Nazionale Dilettanti
Trofeo delle Regioni	(Defunct amateur tournament)	Merger with Coppa Italia Primavera
Coppa Italia	National cup
Supercoppa Italiana	Super cup	Between winners of Serie A and Coppa Italia
Coppa Italia Serie C	Lower cup	Organising body: Lega Italiana Calcio Professionistico
Supercoppa Serie C	Lower super cup	Organising body: Lega Italiana Calcio Professionistico
Supercoppa di Lega di Seconda Divisione	(Defunct lower cup)
Coppa Italia Serie D	Lower cup
Coppa Italia Dilettanti	Lower cup
Campionato Primavera 1	Youth 1st-tier league	Formerly Campionato Nazionale Primavera
Campionato Primavera 2	Youth 2nd-tier league	Formerly Campionato Nazionale Primavera
Campionato Nazionale Dante Berretti	Youth competition	Organising body: Lega Italiana Calcio Professionistico
Campionato Primavera 3	Youth 3rd-tier league
Campionato Regionale Allievi	Youth regional championships	Organising body: Lega Nazionale Dilettanti
Campionato Regionale Giovanissimi	Youth regional championships	Organising body: Lega Nazionale Dilettanti
Campionato Provinciale Allievi	Youth provincial and local championships	Organising body: Lega Nazionale Dilettanti
Campionato Provinciale Giovanissimi	Youth provincial and local championships	Organising body: Lega Nazionale Dilettanti
Torneo Piccoli Amici (Esordienti e Pulcini)	Unofficial youth championships
Coppa Italia Primavera	Youth national cup
Supercoppa Primavera	Youth super cup	Between winners of Campionato Primavera 1 and Coppa Italia Primavera
Torneo di Viareggio	Youth tournament
Campionato Regionale Juniores	Qualifications to the Campionato Nazionale Juniores
Campionato di Terza Categoria Under 21 (pura)
Campionato di Terza Categoria Under 18 (pura)
Campionato Provinciale Juniores		Provincial committees: Lega Nazionale Dilettanti
Campionato Juniores Nazionali
Serie A (women's football)	Women's 1st-tier league
Serie B (women's football)	Women's 2nd-tier league
Serie C (women's football)	Women's 3rd-tier league
Eccellenza (women's football)	Women's 4th-tier league
Coppa Italia di calcio femminile	Women's national cup
Supercoppa Italiana di calcio femminile	Women's Super cup	Between winners of Serie A (women's football) and Coppa Italia di calcio femminile
Campionato Primavera	Women's youth league

==== Kazakhstan ====
===== Leagues =====
- Kazakhstan Premier League: 1st-tier
- Kazakhstan First Division: 2nd-tier
- Kazakhstan Second League: 3rd-tier

===== Cups =====
- Kazakhstan Cup: National cup
- Kazakhstan Super Cup: Super cup

===== Women competitions =====
- Kazakhstani women's football championship
- Kazakhstani Women's Cup

==== Kosovo ====
(Kosovo)	Competitions	League/Cup
^{[Sen.Men]} ^{[L]}	Superliga	1st-tier league	Each year; Each team plays every other team three times
^{[Sen.Men]} ^{[L]}	Liga e Parë	2nd-tier league	2 groups: A and B
^{[Sen.Men]} ^{[L]}	Liga e Dytë	3rd-tier league
^{[Sen.Men]} ^{[L]}	Liga e Tretë	4th-tier league	2 groups: A and B
^{[Sen.Men]} ^{[Cup]}	Kosovar Cup	National cup
^{[Sen.Men]} ^{[Cup]}	Kosovar Supercup	Super cup	Each year; Between Kosovar Cup and Superliga winners
^{[Youth_Men]} ^{[L]}	Superliga – Juniorët	Youth 1st-tier league
^{[Youth_Men]} ^{[L]}	Liga e Parë – Juniorët	Youth 2nd-tier league
^{[Sen.Women]} ^{[L]}	Liga e Femrave	Women 1st-tier league
^{[Futsal]} ^{[L]}	Superliga – Futsall	Futsal 1st-tier league
^{[Futsal]} ^{[L]}	Liga e parë – Futsall	Futsal 2nd-tier league

==== Latvia ====
===== Leagues =====
- Virslīga: 1st-tier
- 1. līga: 2nd-tier
- 2. līga: 3rd-tier
  - Austrumu zona (East Zone)
  - Rietumu zona (West Zone)
- 3. līga: 4th-tier
  - Centra zona (Central Zone)
  - Rietumu zona (Western Zone)
  - Dienvidu zona (Southern Zone)
  - Austrumu zona (Eastern Zone)
- Sieviešu futbola līga: 1st-tier, women's
- Sieviešu futbola 1. līga: 2nd-tier, women's

===== Cups =====
- Latvijas kauss: National cup
- Latvian Supercup: Super cup
- Virslīga Winter Cup: Defunct

==== Liechtenstein ====
- Liechtenstein Cup—This is the only competition exclusively featuring clubs from Liechtenstein. All seven clubs in the country play their league football in the Swiss league system.

==== Lithuania ====
(Lithuania)	Competitions	League/Cup
^{[Sen.Men]} ^{[L]}	A Lyga	1st-tier league
^{[Sen.Men]} ^{[L]}	I Lyga	2nd-tier league
^{[Sen.Men]} ^{[L]}	II Lyga	3rd-tier league	3 groups: East, South and West
^{[Sen.Men]} ^{[L]}	III Lyga	4th-tier league	1-10 groups organized by counties football federations
^{[Sen.Men]} ^{[L]}	SFL	Lower-tier leagues
^{[Sen.Men]} ^{[Cup]}	Lithuanian Football Cup	National cup
^{[Sen.Men]} ^{[Cup]}	Lithuanian Supercup	Super cup	Between A Lyga and LFF Cup winners
^{[Sen.Men]} ^{[Cup]}	SFL Cup	League cup	Played between teams of Sunday Football League
^{[Youth_Men]} ^{[L]}	Lithuanian U-19 Elite League	U-19 1st-tier league
^{[Youth_Men]} ^{[L]}	Lithuanian U-19 I League	U-19 2nd-tier league
^{[Youth_Men]} ^{[L]}	Lithuanian U-19 II League	U-19 3rd-tier league
^{[Youth_Men]} ^{[L]}	Lithuanian U-17 Elite League	U-17 1st-tier league
^{[Youth_Men]} ^{[L]}	Lithuanian U-17 I League	U-17 2nd-tier league	2 groups: South and West
^{[Youth_Men]} ^{[L]}	Lithuanian U-16 I League	U-16 1st-tier league
^{[Youth_Men]} ^{[L]}	Lithuanian U-16 II League	U-16 2nd-tier league	2 groups: East and West
^{[Youth_Men]} ^{[L]}	Lithuanian U-15 I League	U-15 1st-tier league
^{[Youth_Men]} ^{[L]}	Lithuanian U-15 II League	U-15 2nd-tier league	3 groups: East, South and West
^{[Youth_Men]} ^{[L]}	Lithuanian U-14 I League	U-14 1st-tier league
^{[Youth_Men]} ^{[L]}	Lithuanian U-14 II League	U-14 2nd-tier league	3 groups: East, South and West
^{[Sen.Women]} ^{[L]}	A Lyga	Women 1st-tier league
^{[Sen.Women]} ^{[L]}	I Lyga	Women 2nd-tier league	2 groups: East and West
^{[Futsal]} ^{[L]}	A Lyga	Futsal 1st-tier league
^{[Futsal]} ^{[Cup]}	Lithuanian Futsal Cup	Futsal national cup

==== Luxembourg ====
(Luxembourg)	Competitions	League/Cup
^{[Sen.Men]} ^{[L]}	Luxembourg National Division	1st-tier league
^{[Sen.Men]} ^{[L]}	Luxembourg Division of Honour	2nd-tier league
^{[Sen.Men]} ^{[L]}	Luxembourg 1. Division	3rd-tier league	2 "Series" (groups)
^{[Sen.Men]} ^{[L]}	Luxembourg 2. Division	4th-tier league	2 "Series" (groups)
^{[Sen.Men]} ^{[L]}	Luxembourg 3. Division	5th-tier league
^{[Sen.Men]} ^{[Cup]}	Luxembourg Cup	National cup
^{[Sen.Men]} ^{[Cup]}	Luxembourg FLF Cup	Lower cup	Only the teams from the 3rd, the 4th, and the 5th-tier leagues can enter this cup
^{[Sen.Women]} ^{[L]}	Luxembourg Women's Ligue 1	Women 1st-tier league
^{[Sen.Women]} ^{[L]}	Luxembourg Women's Ligue 2	Women 2nd-tier league
^{[Sen.Women]} ^{[L]}	Luxembourg Women's Ligue 3	Women 3rd-tier league	2 "Series" (groups)
^{[Sen.Women]} ^{[Cup]}	Luxembourg Women's Cup	Women's National cup

==== Malta ====
===== Leagues =====
- Maltese Football League
  - Maltese Premier League: 1st-tier
  - Maltese Challenge League: 2nd-tier
  - Maltese National Amateur League: 3rd-tier

For Gozo competitions, see non FIFA competitions section

===== Cups =====
- Maltese FA Trophy: National cup
- Maltese Super Cup: Super cup

==== Moldova ====
(Moldova)	Competitions	League/Cup
^{[Sen.Men]} ^{[L]}	Divizia Națională	1st-tier league
^{[Sen.Men]} ^{[L]}	Moldovan "A" Division	2nd-tier league
^{[Sen.Men]} ^{[L]}	Moldovan "B" Division	3rd-tier league	3 regions: South, Central and North
^{[Sen.Men]} ^{[Cup]}	Moldovan Cup	National Cup
^{[Sen.Men]} ^{[Cup]}	Moldovan Super Cup	Super Cup

==== Montenegro ====
(Montenegro)	Competitions	League/Cup
^{[Sen.Men]} ^{[L]}	Montenegrin First League	1st-tier league
^{[Sen.Men]} ^{[L]}	Montenegrin Second League	2nd-tier league
^{[Sen.Men]} ^{[L]}	Montenegrin Third League	3rd-tier league	3 regions: South, Central and North
^{[Sen.Men]} ^{[Cup]}	Montenegrin Cup	National cup
^{[Sen.Women]} ^{[L]}	Montenegrin Women's League	Women 1st-tier league

==== Netherlands ====
(Netherlands) Competitions	League/Cup
Eredivisie	1st-tier league
Eerste Divisie	2nd-tier league
Tweede Divisie	3rd-tier league
Derde Divisie	4th-tier league
Hoofdklasse	5th-tier league
Eerste Klasse	6th-tier league
Tweede Klasse	7th-tier league
Derde Klasse	8th-tier league
Vierde Klasse	9th-tier league
Vijfde Klasse	10th-tier league
KNVB Beker	National cup
Johan Cruijff Schaal	Super cup	Between winners of Eredivisie and KNVB Beker
KNVB Beker voor beloften	Lower cup
KNVB Beker voor amateurs	Lower cup
Districtsbeker	(Defunct lower cup)
Vrouwen Eredivisie	Women's 1st-tier league
Topklasse	Women's 2nd-tier league
Hoofdklasse	Women's 3rd-tier league
KNVB Beker voor Vrouwen	Women's national cup

==== Northern Ireland ====
(Northern Ireland)	Competitions	League/Cup
^{[Sen.Men]} ^{[L]}	Irish Premiership	1st-tier
^{[Sen.Men]} ^{[L]}	NIFL Championship	2nd-tier
^{[Sen.Men]} ^{[L]}	NIFL Premier Intermediate League	3rd-tier
^{[Sen.Men]} ^{[Cup]}	Irish Cup	National cup
^{[Sen.Men]} ^{[Cup]}	Northern Ireland Football League Cup	League cup
^{[Sen.Men]} ^{[Cup]}	NIFL Charity Shield	Super cup
^{[Sen.Men]} ^{[Cup]}	County Antrim Shield
^{[Sen.Men]} ^{[Cup]}	Mid-Ulster Cup
^{[Sen.Men]} ^{[Cup]}	North West Senior Cup
^{[Sen.Men]} ^{[Cup]}	Irish Intermediate Cup
^{[Sen.Men]} ^{[Cup]}	Steel & Sons Cup
^{[Sen.Men]} ^{[Cup]}	Bob Radcliffe Cup
^{[Sen.Men]} ^{[Cup]}	Craig Memorial Cup
^{[Sen.Men]} ^{[Cup]}	George Wilson Cup

==== North Macedonia ====
===== Leagues =====
- 1. MFL: 1st-tier
- 2. MFL: 2nd-tier
- 3. MFL: 3rd-tier
- Macedonian Regional Football Leagues: 4th/5th-tier
- Macedonian women's football championship

===== Cups =====
- Macedonian Football Cup: National cup
- Macedonian Supercup: Super cup
- Macedonian Women's Football Cup

==== Norway ====
(Norway)	Competitions	League/Cup
^{[Sen.Men]} ^{[L]}	Eliteserien	1st-tier league
^{[Sen.Men]} ^{[L]}	Norwegian First Division	2nd-tier league
^{[Sen.Men]} ^{[L]}	Norwegian Second Division	3rd-tier league
^{[Sen.Men]} ^{[L]}	Norwegian Third Division	4th-tier league
^{[Sen.Men]} ^{[L]}	Norwegian Fourth Division	5th-tier league
^{[Sen.Men]} ^{[Cup]}	NM Cupen	National cup	commonly known as Cupen ("The Cup"), NM or NM Cup
^{[Sen.Men]} ^{[Cup]}	Mesterfinalen	Super cup
^{[Sen.Men]} ^{[Cup]}	Northern Norwegian Cup	(Defunct cup)
^{[Youth_Men]} ^{[Cup]}	Norwegian Youth Cup	Under-19 cup
^{[Youth_Men]} ^{[Cup]}	Norwegian Under-16 Cup	Under-16 cup
^{[Sen.Women]} ^{[L]}	Toppserien	Women's 1st-tier league
^{[Sen.Women]} ^{[L]}	Norwegian First Division (women)	Women's 2nd-tier league
^{[Sen.Women]} ^{[L]}	Norwegian Second Division (women)	Women's 3rd-tier league
^{[Sen.Women]} ^{[Cup]}	Norwegian Women's Cup	Women's national cup
^{[Futsal]} ^{[L]}	NFF Futsal Eliteserie	1st-tier futsal league

==== Poland ====
(Poland) Competitions	League/Cup
Ekstraklasa	1st-tier league
I liga	2nd-tier league
II liga	3rd-tier league
III liga	4th-tier league	4 parallel groups: Group I (North-East), Group II (North-West), Group III (South-West), Group IV (South-East)
IV liga	5th-tier league	16 parallel groups
V liga	6th-tier league
Liga okręgowa	6th-tier league
Klasa A	7th-tier league
Klasa B	8th-tier league
Klasa C	9th-tier league
Polish Cup	National cup
Polish Super Cup	Super cup	Between winners of Ekstraklasa and Polish Cup
Ekstraklasa Cup	(Defunct cup)

==== Portugal ====
(Portugal) Competitions	League/Cup
Primeira Liga	1st-tier league	Organising body: Liga Portugal; also written as Liga Portugal
Liga Portugal 2	2nd-tier league	Organising body: Liga Portugal
Liga 3	3rd-tier league	Beginning from the 2021–22 season as 3rd-tier league
Campeonato de Portugal	4th-tier league	Held with the 3rd-tier league until 2020–21, and from 2021 to 2022 it was held as the 4th-tier league
Portuguese District Championships First Levels	5th-tier league
Portuguese District Championships Second Levels	6th-tier league
Portuguese District Championships Third Levels	7th-tier league
Portuguese District Championships Fourth Levels	8th-tier league
Taça de Portugal	National cup
Taça da Liga	League cup	Organising body: Liga Portugal
Supertaça Cândido de Oliveira	Super cup	Between winners of Primeira Liga and Taça de Portugal
Revelation League	U23 league
Campeonato Nacional Feminino	Women's 1st-tier league
Campeonato Nacional II Divisão Feminino	Women's 2nd-tier league
Taça de Portugal Feminina	Women's national cup
Taça da Liga Feminina	Women's league cup
Supertaça de Portugal Feminina	Women's super cup

==== Republic of Ireland ====
===== Leagues =====
- League of Ireland Premier Division: 1st-tier
- League of Ireland First Division: 2nd-tier
- Women's National League

===== Cups =====
- FAI Cup: National cup
- League of Ireland Cup: League cup
- President of Ireland's Cup: Super cup
- Leinster Senior Cup
- Munster Senior Cup
- FAI Women's Cup

==== Romania ====
(Romania) Competitions	League/Cup
Liga I	1st-tier league	Officially known as the SuperLiga
Liga II	2nd-tier league
Liga III	3rd-tier league	Seria I, II, III, IV, V, VI, VII, VIII, IX & X
Liga IV	4th-tier league	County championship
Liga V	5th-tier league
Liga VI	6th-tier league
Cupa României	National cup
Supercupa României	Super cup	Between winners of Liga I and Cupa României

==== Russia ====
(Russia) Competitions	League/Cup
Russian Premier League	1st-tier league	Also written as Russian Premier Liga
Russian Football National League	2nd-tier league
Russian Football National League 2	3rd-tier league	Centre, East, South, Ural-Povolzhye, West (2021–2022 season consists of Group 1, Group 2, Group 3, and Group 4)
Russian championship among amateur football clubs (III division)	4th-tier league	Regional & sub-regional amateur championship:Russian Amateur Football Championship (LFK)
Russian Cup	National cup
Russian Super Cup	Super cup	Between winners of Russian Premier League and Russian Cup
FNL Cup	(Defunct cup)
Russian Premier League Cup	(Defunct league cup)
Football Cup of the Russian SFSR	(Defunct cup)
Youth football championship of Russia	Youth league	Also known as M-Liga or Russian Premier Liga U-21.

==== San Marino ====
===== Leagues =====
- Campionato Sammarinese di Calcio: 1st-tier

===== Cups =====
- Coppa Titano: National cup
- Super Coppa Sammarinese: Super cup
- Trofeo Federale: defunct
- Torneo Repubblica di San Marino – Defunct friendly tournament held in San Marino

==== Scotland ====
(Scotland)	Competitions	League/Cup
^{[Sen.Men]} ^{[L]}	Scottish Premiership	1st-tier league	1st division of the Scottish Professional Football League; Until 2012–13 season, held as Scottish Premier League.
^{[Sen.Men]} ^{[L]}	Scottish Championship	2nd-tier league	2nd division of the Scottish Professional Football League; Until 2012–13 season, held as Scottish Football League First Division.
^{[Sen.Men]} ^{[L]}	Scottish League One	3rd-tier league	3rd division of the Scottish Professional Football League; Until 2012–13 season, held as Scottish Football League Second Division.
^{[Sen.Men]} ^{[L]}	Scottish League Two	4th-tier league	4th division of the Scottish Professional Football League; Until 2012–13 season, held as Scottish Football League Third Division.
^{[Sen.Men]} ^{[L]}	Highland Football League	5th-tier league
^{[Sen.Men]} ^{[L]}	Lowland Football League	5th-tier league
^{[Sen.Men]} ^{[Cup]}	Scottish Cup	National cup
^{[Sen.Men]} ^{[Cup]}	Scottish League Cup	League cup	Only teams from Scottish Professional Football League can enter this cup.
^{[Sen.Men]} ^{[Cup]}	Scottish Challenge Cup	Lower cup	Teams from SPFL tiers 2-4 and Highland & Lowland league champions can enter this cup. Under 20 teams from the Premier League enter. Invited teams from Republic of Ireland, Northern Ireland, Wales and England compete also.
^{[Sen.Women]} ^{[L]}	Scottish Women's Premier League	Women 1st-tier league
^{[Sen.Women]} ^{[L]}	Scottish Women's First Division	Women 2nd-tier league
^{[Sen.Women]} ^{[L]}	Scottish Women's Second Divisions	Women 3rd-tier leagues	4 regions: North, East & Central, Southeast, West & Southwest.
^{[Sen.Women]} ^{[Cup]}	Scottish Women's Cup	Women National cup
^{[Sen.Women]} ^{[Cup]}	Scottish Women's Premier League Cup	1st-tier League cup	Only teams from Scottish Women's Premier League can enter this cup.
^{[Sen.Women]} ^{[Cup]}	Scottish Women's First Division Cup	2nd-tier League cup	Only teams from Scottish Women's First Division can enter this cup.
^{[Sen.Women]} ^{[Cup]}	Scottish Women's Second Division Cup	3rd-tier League cup	Only teams from Scottish Women's Second Divisions can enter this cup.

==== Serbia ====
(Serbia)	Competitions	League/Cup
^{[Sen.Men]} ^{[L]}	SuperLiga	1st-tier league	16 clubs; Each year July–May; Regular Season+Play-off/Play-out
^{[Sen.Men]} ^{[L]}	Prva Liga Srbije	2nd-tier league	16 clubs; Each year August–May; Each team plays against other twice
^{[Sen.Men]} ^{[L]}	Srpska Liga	3rd-tier league	4 regions: East, West, Vojvodina and Belgrade
^{[Sen.Men]} ^{[L]}	Serbian Zone League	4th-tier league
^{[Sen.Men]} ^{[Cup]}	Kup Srbije	National Cup
^{[Sen.Women]} ^{[L]}	Serbian Super Liga (women)	1st-tier Women's league	8 clubs
^{[Sen.Women]} ^{[Cup]}	Serbian Women's Cup	Women's National Cup
^{[Futsal]} ^{[L]}	Prva Futsal Liga	1st-tier Futsal league	12 clubs

==== Slovakia ====
===== Leagues =====
- Niké Liga: 1st-tier
- 2. liga: 2nd-tier
- 3. liga: 3rd-tier
  - Západ: West
  - Východ: East
- 4. liga: 4th-tier
  - Bratislava
  - Západ: West
  - Stred: Central
  - Východ: East
- 5. liga: 5th-tier
  - 7 groups
- 6. liga: 6th-tier
  - 16 groups
- 7. liga: 7th-tier
- 8. liga: 8th-tier
- 9. liga: 9th-tier
- Slovak Women's First League

===== Cups =====
- Slovak Cup: National cup
- Slovak Super Cup: Super cup
- Slovak Women's Cup

==== Slovenia ====
===== Leagues =====
- 1.SNL: 1st-tier
- 2.SNL: 2nd-tier
- 3.SNL: 3rd-tier
  - 3.SNL-zahod
  - 3.SNL-vzhod
- Slovenian Regional Leagues: 4th-tier
- Regional FA Leagues
- Slovenian Women's League

===== Cups =====
- Hervis Pokal: National cup
- Slovenian Women's Cup

==== Spain ====
(Spain)	Competitions	League/Cup
^{[Sen.Men]} ^{[L]}	La Liga	1st-tier league	Organising body: Liga Nacional de Fútbol Profesional; commonly known as Primera División
^{[Sen.Men]} ^{[L]}	Segunda División	2nd-tier league	Organising body: Liga Nacional de Fútbol Profesional; commonly known as La Liga 2
^{[Sen.Men]} ^{[L]}	Primera Federación	3rd-tier league	2 groups, beginning from the 2021–22 season
^{[Sen.Men]} ^{[L]}	Segunda Federación	4th-tier league	5 groups, beginning from the 2021–22 season
^{[Sen.Men]} ^{[L]}	Tercera Federación	5th-tier league	18 groups, beginning from the 2021–22 season
^{[Sen.Men]} ^{[L]}	Divisiones Regionales	6th to 10th-tier leagues	5th to 9th tiers until 2020–21 season
^{[Sen.Men]} ^{[L]}	Segunda División B	(Defunct 3rd-tier league)
^{[Sen.Men]} ^{[L]}	Tercera División	(Defunct 4th-tier league)
^{[Sen.Men]} ^{[Cup]}	Copa del Rey	National cup
^{[Sen.Men]} ^{[Cup]}	Supercopa de España	Super Cup	Between the winners of La Liga and Copa del Rey and their respectives runners-up.
^{[Sen.Men]} ^{[Cup]}	Copa Federación	Lower cup	Popularly known as the Copa RFEF
^{[Sen.Men]} ^{[Cup]}	Teresa Herrera Trophy	Pre-season cup	Friendly competition
^{[Youth_Men]} ^{[L]}	División de Honor Juvenil	Youth 1st-tier league	7 groups
^{[Youth_Men]} ^{[L]}	Liga Nacional Juvenil	Youth 2nd-tier league	21 groups
^{[Youth_Men]} ^{[L]}	Divisiones Regionales	Youth 3rd-tier league
^{[Youth_Men]} ^{[Cup]}	Copa del Rey Juvenil	Youth cup
^{[Youth_Men]} ^{[Cup]}	Copa de Campeones Juvenil	Youth cup	The winners of the seven groups of the División de Honor Juvenil and the best runner-up qualify for this competition.
^{[Sen.Women]} ^{[L]}	Liga F	Women's 1st-tier league
^{[Sen.Women]} ^{[L]}	Primera Federación	Women's 2nd-tier league
^{[Sen.Women]} ^{[L]}	Segunda Federación	Women's 3rd-tier league
^{[Sen.Women]} ^{[L]}	Primera Nacional de Fútbol	Women's 4th-tier league
^{[Sen.Women]} ^{[L]}	Divisiones Regionales de Fútbol Femenino	Women's 5th and lower-tier league
^{[Sen.Women]} ^{[Cup]}	Copa de la Reina	Women's National cup

==== Sweden ====
===== Leagues =====
- Allsvenskan: 1st-tier
- Superettan: 2nd-tier
- Division 1: 3rd-tier
- Division 2: 4th-tier
- Division 3: 5th-tier
- Division 4: 6th-tier
- Division 5: 7th-tier
- Division 6: 8th-tier
- Division 7: 9th-tier
- Division 8: 10th-tier
- Damallsvenskan: women's premier league (1st-tier)
- Elitettan: women's 2nd-tier

===== Cups =====
- Svenska Cupen: National cup
- Svenska Cupen (women)

==== Switzerland ====
===== Leagues =====
- Swiss Super League: 1st-tier
- Swiss Challenge League: 2nd-tier
- Promotion League: 3rd-tier
- 1. Liga Classic: 4th-tier
- 2. Liga Interregional: 5th-tier
- 2. Liga: 6th-tier
- 3. Liga: 7th-tier
- 4. Liga: 8th-tier
- 5. Liga: 9th-tier
- Swiss Women's Super League: women's football
- Nationalliga B

===== Cups =====
- Schweizer Cup: National cup
- Uhrencup
- Cup of the Alps
- Swiss League Cup: defunct
- Swiss Super Cup: defunct
- Swiss Women's Cup

==== Türkiye ====
(Turkey)	Competitions	League/Cup
^{[Sen.Men]} ^{[L]}	Süper Lig	1st-tier league
^{[Sen.Men]} ^{[L]}	TFF 1. Lig	2nd-tier league
^{[Sen.Men]} ^{[L]}	TFF 2. Lig	3rd-tier league	2 groups
^{[Sen.Men]} ^{[L]}	TFF 3. Lig	4th-tier league	3 groups
^{[Sen.Men]} ^{[L]}	Bölgesel Amatör Ligi	5th-tier league
^{[Sen.Men]} ^{[L]}	Süper Amatör Ligleri	6th-tier league
^{[Sen.Men]} ^{[L]}	Birinci Amatör Küme	7th-tier league
^{[Sen.Men]} ^{[L]}	İkinci Amatör Küme	8th-tier league
^{[Sen.Men]} ^{[Cup]}	Turkish Cup	National cup
^{[Sen.Men]} ^{[Cup]}	Turkish Super Cup	Super Cup
^{[Sen.Men]} ^{[Cup]}	Chancellor Cup	Defunct Cup
^{[Sen.Men]} ^{[Cup]}	Atatürk Cup	Defunct Cup
^{[Sen.Women]} ^{[L]}	Kadınlar Süper Ligi	Women's 1st-tier league
^{[Sen.Women]} ^{[L]}	Kadınlar 1. Ligi	Women's 2nd-tier league
^{[Sen.Women]} ^{[L]}	Kadınlar 2. Ligi	Women's 3rd-tier league
^{[Sen.Women]} ^{[L]}	Kadınlar 3. Ligi	Women's 4th-tier league

==== Ukraine ====
(Ukraine) Competitions	League/Cup
Ukrainian Premier League	1st-tier league
Ukrainian First League	2nd-tier league	Also known as the Persha Liha
Ukrainian Second League	3rd-tier league	Also known as the Druha Liha
Ukrainian Amateur Football Championship	4th-tier league
Regional championships	5th-tier league
Ukraine regional league	Regional league
Ukrainian Cup	National cup
Ukrainian Super Cup	Super cup	Between Ukrainian Premier League and Ukrainian Cup winners
Ukrainian Amateur Cup	Amateur cup
FFU Region's Cup	Amateur cup

==== Wales ====
(Wales)	Competitions	League/Cup
^{[Sen.Men]} ^{[L]}	Cymru Premier	1st-tier
^{[Sen.Men]} ^{[L]}	Cymru North	2nd-tier
^{[Sen.Men]} ^{[L]}	Cymru South	2nd-tier
^{[Sen.Men]} ^{[L]}	Ardal Leagues	3rd-tier	North East; North West; South East; South West
^{[Sen.Men]} ^{[L]}	Area leagues	4th-tier
^{[Sen.Men]} ^{[L]}	Lower tier leagues	5th-tier–Lower Division
^{[Sen.Women]} ^{[L]}	Welsh Premier Women's Football League	1st-tier league
^{[Sen.Men]} ^{[Cup]}	Welsh Cup	National cup
^{[Sen.Men]} ^{[Cup]}	FAW Premier Cup
^{[Sen.Men]} ^{[Cup]}	Welsh League Cup
^{[Sen.Men]} ^{[Cup]}	FAW Trophy
^{[Sen.Men]} ^{[Cup]}	Welsh Blood Service League Cup
^{[Sen.Men]} ^{[Cup]}	Welsh Football League Cup	defunct
^{[Sen.Men]} ^{[Cup]}	Cymru Alliance League Cup	defunct
^{[Sen.Women]} ^{[Cup]}	FAW Women's Cup
^{[Men]} ^{[Cup]}	FAW Welsh Youth Cup

== Non-FIFA competitions ==
This section lists the competitions ruled by associations outside FIFA or its confederations. This includes nations, territories, regions and dependencies. This does not include competitions in continental confederations who may not be a part of FIFA.

=== Worldwide ===
- Clericus Cup: organised by Centro Sportivo Italiano
- CONIFA World Football Cup: organised by Confederation of Independent Football Associations
- Viva World Cup: organised by New Football Federations-Board
- FIFI Wild Cup: organised by Federation of International Football Independents
- Island Games
- UNPO Cup: organised by Unrepresented Nations and Peoples Organization
- Europeada: organised by Federal Union of European Nationalities
- ELF Cup: organised by Cyprus Turkish Football Federation
- Homeless World Cup
- Unofficial Football World Championships
- Women's Unofficial Football World Championships: Women's

=== Abkhazia ===
==== Leagues ====
- Abkhazian Premier League: 1st-tier

==== Cups ====
- Abkhazian Cup: National cup
- Abkhazia Super Cup: Super cup

=== Ascension Island ===
==== Leagues ====
- Ascension Island Football League: 1st-tier

==== Cups ====
- Ascension Island League Cup
- Ascension Island District Cup
- J. Lawrence Knock-out Cup
- Flipper Cup

=== Christmas Island ===
==== Leagues ====
- Christmas Island Soccer League

=== Crimea ===
==== Leagues ====
- Crimean Premier League: 1st-tier

=== Donetsk People's Republic ===
==== Leagues ====
- Master-Torg DPR Premier League: 1st-tier

=== Falkland Islands ===
==== Leagues ====
- Falkland Islands Football League: 1st-tier

=== Federated States of Micronesia ===
- Pohnpei Premier League
- Micronesian Games Football Tournament

=== Gozo ===
==== Leagues ====
- Gozo Football League First Division: 1st-tier
- Gozo Football League Second Division: 2nd-tier
- Gozo Football Female League

==== Cups ====
- G.F.A. Cup: National cup
- Independence Cup
- Freedom Day Cup
- Second Division Knock-Out

=== Greenland ===
==== Leagues ====
- Greenlandic Men's Football Championship: 1st-tier
- Greenlandic Women's Football Championship

==== Cups ====
- Greenland Cup

=== Guernsey ===
==== Leagues ====
- Priaulx League: 1st-tier
- FNB Jackson League: 1st-tier
- Railway League 1
- Railway League 2
- Guernsey Veterans League
- Guernsey Women's League

==== Cups ====
- Guernsey FA Cup
- Frederick Martinez Cup
- Stranger Charity Cup
- Mauger Cup
- Rouget Cup
- Rawlinson Cup
- Le Vallee Cup
  - Upton Park Trophy – Held between champions of Guernsey and champions of Jersey
- Guernsey Women's Knock-out Cup
- Guernsey Women's Secondary Cup

=== Iraqi Kurdistan ===
==== Leagues ====
- Kurdistan Premier League: 1st-tier

==== Cups ====
- Kurdistan Cup
- Kurdistan Super Cup

=== Isle of Man ===
==== Leagues ====
- Isle of Man Football League
  - Isle of Man Premier League: 1st-tier
  - Isle of Man Division 2: 2nd-tier
- Isle of Man Football Combination

==== Cups ====
- Isle of Man FA Cup: National cup
- Isle of Man Hospital Cup
- Isle of Man Railway Cup
- Isle of Man Gold Cup
- Isle of Man Woods Memorial Cup
- Isle of Man Charity Shield: Super cup

=== Isles of Scilly ===
==== Leagues ====
- Isles of Scilly Football League: 1st-tier

==== Cups ====
- Wholesalers Cup
- Foredeck Cup

=== Jersey ===
==== Leagues ====
- Jersey Football Combination: 1st-tier
- Jersey Championship: 2nd-tier

==== Cups ====
- Le Riche Cup: Domestic cup
- Wheway Trophy: JFC league cup
- Jersey Charity Cup: Community/charity trophy
- Alex Scott Cup
- Brian Beckett Cup
- Colin Welsh cup
- Cory Cup
- David Melton Memorial Trophy
- Eric Amy Cup
- G4S Cup
- Jason Lee Memorial Trophy
- Lady Bingham Cup
- Presidents Trophy
- Riche Broken Memorial Cup
- Touzel Cup
- Tradesmen Trophy
- Tregear Cup
- Trinity Shield
- Willis Cup
- Zenith Cup
  - Upton Park Trophy – Held between champions of Guernsey and champions of Jersey

=== Luhansk People's Republic ===
==== Leagues ====
Luhansk Football League

=== Marshall Islands ===
==== Leagues ====
- Marshallese Soccer League

=== Mayotte ===
==== Leagues ====
- Mayotte Division Honneur: 1st-tier

==== Cups ====
- Coupe de Mayotte

=== Mexico ===
==== Competitions ====
- Liga de Balompié Mexicano

=== Monaco ===
==== Competitions ====
- Challenge Prince Rainier III: 1st-tier
- Trophée Ville de Monaco: 2nd-tier
- Challenge Monégasque: 3rd-tier

=== Nauru ===
==== Leagues ====
- Nauru Soccer League

=== Niue ===
==== Leagues ====
- Niue Soccer Tournament: 1st-tier

=== Northern Cyprus ===
==== Leagues ====
- KTFF Süper Lig (English: CTFA Super League): 1st-tier
- KTFF 1. Lig: 2nd-tier
- KTFF 2. Lig: 3rd-tier
- KTFF Women's League

==== Cups ====
- Cypriot Cup: National cup
- KTFF Super Cup: Super cup

=== Palau ===
==== Leagues ====
- Palau Soccer League: 1st-tier
- Palau Youth Soccer League

=== Sahrawi Arab Democratic Republic ===
Also known as Western Sahara

==== Cups ====
- Sahrawi Republic Cup

=== Saint Barthélemy ===
==== Leagues ====
- Saint-Barthelemy Championships: 1st-tier

==== Cups ====
- Coupe de Saint-Barth
- Trophée José da Silva

=== Saint Helena ===
==== Leagues ====
- St. Helena Island Football League: 1st-tier
  - Division 2
  - Division 3

=== Saint Pierre and Miquelon ===
==== Leagues ====
- Ligue de Football de Saint Pierre et Miquelon: 1st-tier

=== Singapore ===
==== Leagues ====
Cosmopolitan Football League: 1st tier

=== Somaliland ===
==== Leagues ====
- Somaliland Football League

==== Cups ====
- Telesom Cup
- Somaliland Regional Games

=== South Ossetia ===
==== Leagues ====
- South Ossetian Football League
- South Ossetia Youth League

=== Tokelau ===
==== Leagues ====
See Soccer in Tokelau.

=== Tuvalu ===
==== Leagues ====
- Tuvalu A-Division League: 1st-tier
- Tuvalu B-Division League: 2nd-tier
- Tuvalu A-Division League (women's)

==== Cups ====
- Taganoa Cup
- NBT Cup: National cup
- Independence Cup
- Christmas Cup
- Tuvalu Games Football Cup

=== Vatican City ===
==== Leagues ====
- Vatican City Championship: 1st-tier

==== Cups ====
- Coppa Sergio Valci: National cup
- Supercoppa: Super cup
  - Other – Clericus Cup

=== Wallis and Futuna ===
==== Leagues ====
- Wallis Première Division
- Wallis Deuxième Division
- Futuna Première Division
- Futuna Deuxième Division

==== Cups ====
- Coupe de l'Outre-Mer: Defunct
- Outremer Champions Cup: Both of these cups were held for territories of France, both are now defunct

== Competitions in former nations ==
This section lists competitions in former nations, unions, empires, protectorates and territories, all of which are defunct.

Austria-Hungary | Commonwealth of Independent States | Czechoslovakia | German Democratic Republic | Mandatory Palestine | Netherlands Antilles | North Vietnam | Ottoman Empire | People's Democratic Republic of Yemen | Republic of Artsakh | Saar Protectorate | Serbia and Montenegro | South Vietnam | Soviet Union | Yemen Arab Republic | Yugoslavia

=== Austria-Hungary ===
==== Leagues ====
- Tagblatt Pokal

==== Cups ====
- Austria-Hungary Challenge Cup

=== Commonwealth of Independent States ===
- CIS Super League: Proposed
- United Tournament
- United Supercup

=== Czechoslovakia ===
==== Leagues ====
- Czechoslovak First League
- Czechoslovak Second League
- Czechoslovak Third League

==== Cups ====
- Czechoslovak Cup

=== German Democratic Republic ===
Also known as East Germany

==== Leagues ====
- DDR-Oberliga
- DDR-Liga Staffel A
- DDR-Liga Staffel B
- II. DDR-Liga
- Bezirksliga: 15 Regional leagues
  - Bezirksliga Schwerin
  - Bezirksliga Rostock
  - Bezirksliga Neubrandenburg
  - Bezirksliga Magdeburg
  - Bezirksliga Potsdam
  - Bezirksliga Berlin
  - Bezirksliga Frankfurt/Oder
  - Bezirksliga Cottbus
  - Bezirksliga Halle
  - Bezirksliga Gera
  - Bezirksliga Erfurt
  - Bezirksliga Dresden
  - Bezirksliga Leipzig
  - Bezirksliga Karl-Marx-Stadt / Chemnitz
  - Bezirksliga Suhl

==== Cups ====
- FDGB-Pokal
- DFV-Supercup

=== Mandatory Palestine ===
==== Leagues ====
- Mandatory Palestine League: 1923–1947
- Palestine Premier League (1945–1947)
- Mis'chakei HaBechora
- Haifa League
- Jerusalem Services and Police League
- Jerusalem League: 1940
- Liga Bet (Division 2)
  - Samaria Division
  - Sharon Division
- Liga Gimel (Division 3)
- Palestine Youth League

==== Cups ====
- Palestine Cup (1922–1947)
- Hebrew Cup: 1922–1925
- People's Cup (1928)
- Tel Aviv District Cup
- Palestine Mond Cup
- Jerusalem Cup
- Nashashibi Cup
- Jaffa Mayor Cup
- Mr. Guth Cup
- Melchett Cup
- Palestine Autumn Cup
- Palestine National Shield
- Nesher Cup: Cup for winners of the Samaria and Sharon Divisions
- Haifa Cup: Following the cancellation of the Haifa league
- Palestine North Cup
- Jezreel Valley Cup
- Jordan Valley Cup
- The Wartime Cup

=== Netherlands Antilles ===
==== Leagues ====
- Netherlands Antilles Championship

=== North Vietnam ===
==== Leagues ====
- North Vietnam V-League

=== Ottoman Empire ===
The İstanbul Lig and İstanbul Profesyonel Futbol Ligi ran after the collapse of the Ottoman Empire but continued under the Constantinople Football League and has since been defunct.

==== Leagues ====
- Constantinople Football League
  - İstanbul Pazar Ligi
  - İstanbul Cuma Ligi
  - İstanbul Ligi
  - İstanbul Profesyonel Futbol Ligi

=== People's Democratic Republic of Yemen ===
==== Leagues ====
- South Yemeni League

==== Cups ====
- South Yemen Cup

=== Republic of Artsakh ===
==== Leagues ====
- Artsakh Football League: 1st-tier

==== Cups ====
- Artsakh Cup

=== Saar Protectorate ===
- Amateurliga Saarland: The representing league of the Saar Protectorate 1947–1956, of Saarland, Germany

=== Serbia and Montenegro ===
==== Leagues ====
- First League of Serbia and Montenegro
- Second League of Serbia and Montenegro
- Serbian First League (2004–2006)
- Montenegrin First League (2004–2006)

==== Cups ====
- Serbia and Montenegro Cup

=== South Vietnam ===
==== Leagues ====
- South Vietnam V-League
- South Vietnam V-League Division 2

==== Cups ====
- South Vietnam League Cup

=== Soviet Union ===
Also known as the USSR. See also: Soviet Union football league system

==== Leagues ====
- Soviet Top League
- Soviet First League
- Soviet Second League
- Soviet Second League B

==== Cups ====
- Soviet Cup
- Soviet Super Cup
- USSR Federation Cup
- All-Union Committee of Physical Culture and Sports Tournament
- Soviet Season Opener Cup
- Nedel Cup
- USSR 60th Anniversary Cup
- Valentin Granatkin Memorial Tournament
- Snowdrop Tournament
- Soviet Sport Prize

=== Yemen Arab Republic ===
Also known as North Yemen

==== Leagues ====
- North Yemeni League

==== Cups ====
- North Yemen Cup of the Republic

=== Yugoslavia ===
==== Leagues ====
- Yugoslav First League
- Yugoslav Second League
- Yugoslav Third League
- Yugoslav Republic Regional Leagues

==== Cups ====
- Yugoslav Cup
- Yugoslav Super Cup

== See also ==
- International competitions in women's association football
- List of women's national association football teams
- List of association football competitions using VAR
- List of men's national association football teams
- List of women's association football clubs
- Geography of women's association football
- Geography of association football
- Lists of association football clubs
- List of futsal competitions
- Beach Soccer Worldwide
