= Football at the 2015 Island Games – Men's tournament =

Men's Football at the Island Games 2015
Tournament details
- Host country: Jersey
- Dates: 28 June – 3 July
- Teams: 16

Final positions
- Champions: Guernsey (3rd title)
- Runners-up: Isle of Man
- Third place: Menorca
- Fourth place: Shetland

The 2015 Island Games in Jersey was the fourteenth edition in which a football tournament was played at the multi-games competition.

== Participants ==
- Åland
- Alderney
- Falkland Islands
- Gibraltar (development squad)
- Gotland
- Greenland
- Guernsey
- Hitra Municipality
- Isle of Man
- Isle of Wight
- Jersey
- Menorca
- Saare County
- Shetland
- Western Isles
- Ynys Môn

== Venues ==
Ground	Locale
Le Boulivot	Grouville
Le Squendez	St. Brelade
La Coeffardiere	St. Clement
Springfield Stadium	St. Helier
Le Couvent	St. Lawrence
La Rue des Vignes	St. Peter
Recreation Centre	St. John
La Cache es Fresnes	St. Ouen

Men's football venues of the 2015 Island Games

== Group Phase ==
=== Group A ===
Rank	Nation	Pld	W	D	L	GF	GA	GD	Pts
1	Menorca	3	2	1	0	8	3	5	7
2	Greenland	3	2	1	0	6	3	3	7
3	Åland	3	1	0	2	3	6	–3	3
4	Saare County	3	0	0	3	2	7	–5	0

28 June
12:30

Greenland	2–2	Menorca
Frederik Funch; John-Ludvig Broberg	Report	Pablo Rioja; Izan Canet

Le Boulivot, Grouville

28 June
16:30

Saare County	1–2	Åland
Elari Valmas	Report	Erik Lundberg; Rezgar Amani

Le Boulivot, Grouville
Attendance: 64

29 June
12:30

Åland	0–2	Greenland
	Report	Frederik Funch; Malik Juhl

La Coeffardiere, St. Clement
Attendance: 84

29 June
12:30

Menorca	3–0	Saare County
	Report

La Coeffardiere, St. Clement

30 June
15:00

Åland	1–3	Menorca
Rezgar Amani	Report	Carlos Febrer; Helenio Olives; Juan Pons

La Coeffardiere, St. Clement

30 June
15:00

Greenland	2–1	Saare County
Frederik Funch; John-Ludvig Broberg	Report

Le Boulivot, Grouville

=== Group B ===
Rank	Nation	Pld	W	D	L	GF	GA	GD	Pts
1	Guernsey	3	3	0	0	12	2	10	9
2	Ynys Môn	3	1	1	1	6	8	–2	4
3	Gibraltar	3	1	1	1	3	6	–3	4
4	Gotland	3	0	0	3	3	8	–5	0

28 June
13:30

Gibraltar	2–1	Gotland
Nathan Santos	Report	Christian Zachrisson

La Rue des Vignes, St. Peter
Attendance: 107

28 June
17:30

Ynys Môn	2–5	Guernsey
Dewi Thomas; Gareth Own	Report	Craig Young; Ross Allen; Dominic Heaume; Liam Mahon

La Rue des Vignes, St. Peter
Attendance: 205

29 June
13:30

Guernsey	3–0	Gotland
Marc McGrath; Tom Strawbridge; Glyn Dyer	Report

Le Squendez, St. Brelade
Attendance: 288

29 June
14:00

Gibraltar	1–1	Ynys Môn
Alain Pons	Report	Ryan Booth

Springfield Stadium, St. Helier

30 June
13:00

Gotland	2–3	Ynys Môn
Jonathan Bogren	Report	Gareth Owen; Own goal Ryan Booth

La Rue des Vignes, St. Peter
Attendance: 186

30 June
13:00

Gibraltar	0–4	Guernsey
	Report	Dominic Heaume; Ryan-Zico Black

Springfield Stadium, St. Helier

=== Group C ===
Rank	Nation	Pld	W	D	L	GF	GA	GD	Pts
1	Shetland	3	2	1	0	9	1	8	7
2	Isle of Wight	3	2	1	0	6	1	5	7
3	Falkland Islands	3	1	0	2	2	9	–7	3
4	Hitra Municipality	3	0	0	3	3	9	–6	0

28 June
16:30

Falkland Islands	2–1	Hitra Municipality
Chipunza; Sotomayor	Report	Sondre Fiskvik

Recreation Centre, St. John
Attendance: 131

28 June
16:30

Shetland	0–0	Isle of Wight
	Report

Le Couvent, St. Lawrence
Attendance: 130

29 June
17:30

Isle of Wight	3–0	Falkland Islands
Craig Insley; Michael McEnery; Jared Wetherick	Report

La Cache es Fresnes, St. Ouen
Attendance: 207

29 June
17:30

Hitra Municipality	1–4	Shetland
Simen Eide	Report	Leighton Flaws; Erik Thomson

Le Squendez, St. Brelade
Attendance: 135

30 June
16:30

Isle of Wight	3–1	Hitra Municipality
Joe Butcher; Jared Wetherick; Max Draper	Report

Le Couvent, St. Lawrence

30 June
16:30

Falkland Islands	0–5	Shetland
	Report	Shane Jamieson; Erik Thomson; Leighton Flaws

La Rue des Vignes, St. Peter

=== Group D ===
Rank	Nation	Pld	W	D	L	GF	GA	GD	Pts
1	Isle of Man	3	3	0	0	18	1	17	9
2	Jersey	3	2	0	1	10	2	8	6
3	Western Isles	3	1	0	2	3	14	–11	3
4	Alderney	3	0	0	3	2	16	–14	0

28 June
13:00

Western Isles	0–9	Isle of Man
	Report	Ian Harrion; Dan Bell; Ciaran McNulty; Ashley Webster; Josh Myers; Frank Jones; Conor Doyle; Sam Caine

Le Couvent, St. Lawrence
Attendance: 97

28 June
13:00

Jersey	6–0	Alderney
Jake Baker; Jack Boyle; Luke Watson; Karl Hinds; Jack Cannon; Cavaghn Miley	Report

Springfield Stadium, St. Helier

29 June
13:30

Isle of Man	7–0	Alderney
Ashley Webster; Sam Carne; Chris Bass; Dominic McGreery; Conor Doyle	Report

La Cache es Fresnes, St. Ouen
Attendance: 105

29 June
17:30

Jersey	3–0	Western Isles
Jack Boyle; James MacLeod (o.g.); Luke Watson	Report

Springfield Stadium, St. Helier
Attendance: 1,400

30 June
16:30

Jersey	1–2	Isle of Man
Karl Hinds	Report	Frank Jones; Ciaran McNulty

Recreation Centre, St. John
Attendance: 1,800

30 June
16:30

Alderney	2–3	Western Isles
Ross Benfield	Report	Stuart Munro; Robert Jones; Angus Campbell

La Rue des Vignes, St. Peter
Attendance: 118

== Placement play-off matches ==
=== 15th place match ===
2 July
16:00

Hitra Municipality	5–1	Alderney
Eirik Jørgensen; Sondre Fiskvik; Eirik Althammer; Sindre Kvakland	Report	Damien Larkin

La Cache es Fresnes, St. Ouen
Attendance: 62

=== 13th place match ===
2 July
12:00

Gotland	2–3	Saare County
	Report

La Cache es Fresnes, St. Ouen

=== 11th place match ===
2 July
17:30

Falkland Islands	1–2	Western Isles
Alejandro Santana	Report	Stuart Munro; Alasdair Gillies

Le Squendez, St. Brelade
Attendance: 68

=== 9th place match ===
2 July
13:30

Gibraltar	0–0	Åland
	Report
Penalties
	5–6

Le Squendez, St. Brelade
Attendance: 61

=== 7th place match ===
2 July
16:00

Jersey	1–0	Ynys Môn
Daryl Wilson	Report

La Coeffardiere, St. Clement

=== 5th place match ===
2 July
12:00

Isle of Wight	1–2	Greenland
Nathan Lewis	Report	Norsaq Mathæussen; Kaali Mathæussen

La Coeffardiere, St. Clement
Attendance: 70

== Final stage ==
=== Bracket ===
Semi-finals
2 July – (St. Helier)
Menorca	1
Guernsey	2
2 July – (St. Helier)
Shetland	1
Isle of Man	3

Final
3 July – (St. Helier)
Guernsey	3
Isle of Man	0
Third place
3 July – (St. Peter)
Menorca	1
Shetland	0

==== Semi-finals ====
2 July
14:00

Menorca	1–2	Guernsey
Izan Canet	Report	Ryan-Zico Black; Tom De La Mare

Springfield Stadium, St. Helier

2 July
18:00

Shetland	1–3	Isle of Man
Shane Jamieson	Report	Lee Gale; Frank Jones

Springfield Stadium, St. Helier

==== Third place match ====
3 July
12:00

Menorca	1–0	Shetland
	Report

La Rue des Vignes, St. Peter

==== Final ====
3 July
14:00

Guernsey	3–0	Isle of Man
Craig Young; Ross Allen; Kieran Mahon	Report

Springfield Stadium, St. Helier
Attendance: 1,320

2015 Island Games Winners
Guernsey
Third Title

== Final rankings ==
Rank	Team
Gold medal	Guernsey
Silver medal	Isle of Man
Bronze medal	Menorca
4	Shetland
5	Greenland
6	Isle of Wight
7	Jersey
8	Ynys Môn
9	Åland
10	Gibraltar
11	Western Isles
12	Falkland Islands
13	Saare County
14	Gotland
15	Hitra Municipality
16	Alderney

== See also ==
- Women's Football at the 2015 Island Games
- Football at the 2015 Island Games
