= Peter Vincenti =

Jèrriais footballer (born 1986)

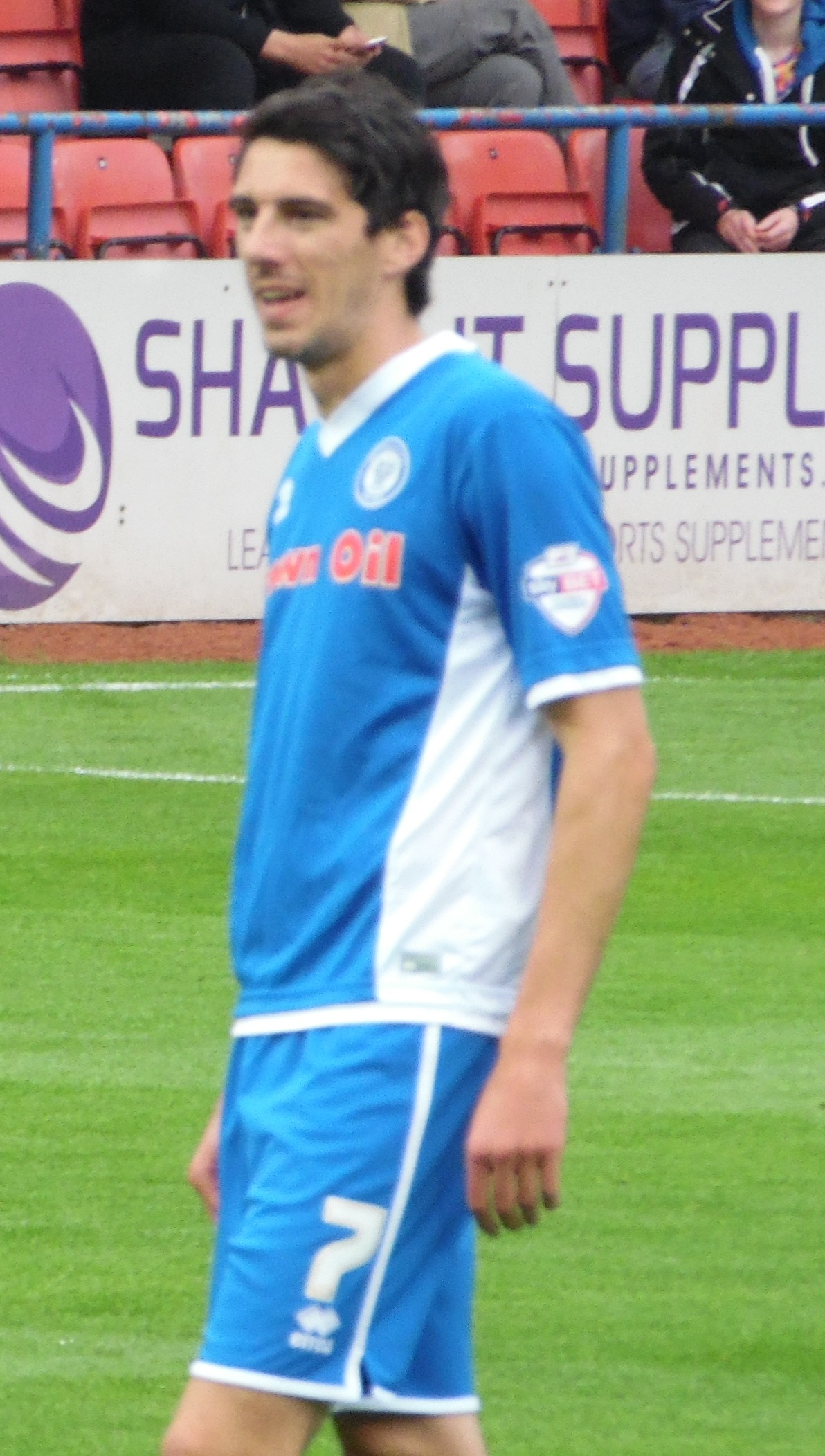
- Vincenti playing for Rochdale in 2015

Personal information
- Full name: Peter Ian Vincenti
- Date of birth: 7 July 1986 (age 40)
- Place of birth: Saint Peter, Jersey
- Height: 6 ft 4 in (1.93 m)
- Positions: Attacking midfielder; winger

Team information
- Current team: St. Peter

Youth career
- 2003–2004: First Tower United
- 2004–2005: St. Peter

Senior career*
Years	Team	Apps	(Gls)
2005–2007	St. Peter		
2007–2008	Millwall	0	(0)
2008–2011	Stevenage	64	(5)
2010	→ Mansfield Town (loan)	3	(0)
2011–2013	Aldershot Town (Note: Soccerbase's stats for the match between Aldershot Town and Stockport County on 19 March 2011 fail to include Vincenti's appearance for Aldershot. The website has incorrectly given the appearance to Jamie Vincent, as opposed to Vincenti. Therefore, until and unless they correct it, he should have one more appearance for Aldershot than given on his Soccerbase page.)	103	(14)
2013–2017	Rochdale	131	(27)
2017–2018	Coventry City	24	(3)
2018–2020	Macclesfield Town	16	(1)
2019–2020	→ Hereford (loan)	13	(4)
2020–	St. Peter	60	(18)

International career
- Jersey U18
- Jersey
- * Club domestic league appearances and goals as of 16:26, 28 July 2026 (UTC)

Peter Ian Vincenti (born 7 July 1986) is a Jèrriais professional footballer who plays for Jersey Football Combination club St. Peter. Deployed as a winger, he has also been utilised in attacking midfield and as a forward. He is also vice-chairman of the Professional Footballers' Association (PFA).

Vincenti began his career in Jersey with First Tower United and St. Peter, before joining Millwall in July 2007. He moved to Stevenage Borough the following year, helping the club win the FA Trophy in 2009 and promotion to the Football League in the 2009–10 season. After a loan spell at Mansfield Town, he signed for Aldershot Town in January 2011, making 117 appearances during two and a half seasons.

He joined Rochdale in May 2013, achieving promotion to League One in his first season and scored 32 goals in 152 appearances across four years at the club. Vincenti then signed for Coventry City in July 2017, where he was part of the squad that won promotion to League One via the play-offs. He subsequently played for Macclesfield Town, including a loan spell at Hereford, before rejoining St. Peter in September 2020. He has also represented the Jersey national team, playing at the 2007 Island Games.

== Early life ==
Vincenti was born in Saint Peter, Jersey. His father, also named Peter Vincenti, played as a midfielder and later managed the Jersey national football team. Despite his father's involvement in football, Vincenti stated his parents were "never obsessive" about him playing and placed greater emphasis on the importance of education. He studied Business Studies at Liverpool Hope University prior to beginning his professional football career. He later earned a master's degree in Business Administration from the Open University.

== Club career ==
=== Early career ===
Vincenti was a product of the Jersey Football Association's centre of excellence, and began his football career as a youth player at First Tower United juniors before moving to his local team, St. Peter. He progressed into the first team at St. Peter, playing on a part-time basis. After graduating from Liverpool Hope University, during which he played only socially for the university's second team, Vincenti had planned to move to Dublin to pursue a career in finance. Brian Foulser, the academy director at St. Peter, had contacts at English club Millwall and arranged a trial for Vincenti in July 2007. He played in three pre-season friendlies for the club, against Tooting & Mitcham United, Kingstonian, and Sutton United, and earned a four-month contract that ran until December 2007. Vincenti did not make a first-team appearance for Millwall, making the substitutes' bench once in a League One match against Swindon Town.

=== Stevenage ===
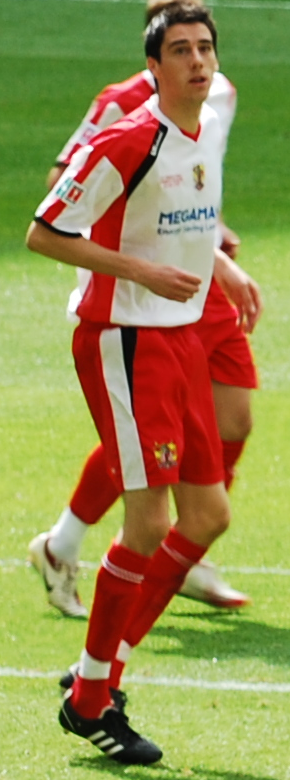
Vincenti playing for Stevenage Borough in the 2009 FA Trophy final

When his contract at Millwall expired, Vincenti joined Stevenage Borough on a free transfer on 4 January 2008. He made his debut for the club in a 5–0 victory over Droylsden on 19 January 2008. Five days later, on 24 January 2008, he signed a contract extension until 2010, having impressed manager Peter Taylor. Vincenti made 12 appearances for Stevenage towards the latter stages of the club's 2007–08 season, scoring his first goal for the club in a 3–1 win against Crawley Town on 1 March 2008. He was transfer-listed following the reappointment of Graham Westley as manager in May 2008.

After Stevenage began the 2008–09 season by losing three out of their first four matches, conceding 13 goals in the process, Vincenti made his first appearance in the club's fifth game, a 1–1 draw with Crawley Town. Vincenti's return to the first team coincided with an upturn in form, and he was removed from the transfer list by Westley in September 2008. He scored the winning goal against Stevenage's rivals Woking on 1 November 2008, scoring from 25 yards in a 1–0 away victory. Vincenti also scored a last-minute winner in the second leg of the FA Trophy semi-final against Ebbsfleet United on 21 March 2009. The win secured Stevenage's place in the final at Wembley Stadium, which Vincenti started, as Stevenage defeated York City 2–0. In doing so, he became the first player from the Channel Islands to appear in a competitive match at the new Wembley Stadium. Vincenti made 31 appearances during his first full season with the club, scoring four goals.

Before the start of the 2009–10 season, Vincenti was loaned to Conference South club Woking on a three-month deal after playing in a trial match for the club. The following day, Stevenage played out a 0–0 draw with Woking in their final pre-season fixture, and despite having joined the latter on loan, Vincenti played for his parent club. Shortly after the match, Westley concluded he could not afford to release Vincenti, and the loan agreement was cancelled. Vincenti played in five of the first six matches of the season, all of which as a substitute, and started the following game against Histon on 31 August 2009, during which he was sent off in the sixth minute for violent conduct. In October 2009, he came on as a substitute to score a 94th-minute winner in the FA Cup against Chelmsford City. Vincenti made 26 appearances in all competitions that season, as Stevenage earned promotion to the Football League for the first time in the club's history.

He started in Stevenage's first Football League match, a 2–2 draw against Macclesfield Town on 7 August 2010, scoring the club's first-ever goal in the Football League in the sixth minute by heading in Charlie Griffin's cross from close range. His goal was also the first goal of the 2010–11 League Two season. During his three years at Stevenage, Vincenti scored seven times in 77 appearances. In October 2010, Vincenti joined Conference Premier club Mansfield Town on an initial three-month loan, with a view to the agreement being made permanent in January 2011. He made his Mansfield debut in the club's 4–1 home defeat to Crawley Town, playing 75 minutes before being substituted. Vincenti made four appearances during the loan spell.

=== Aldershot Town ===
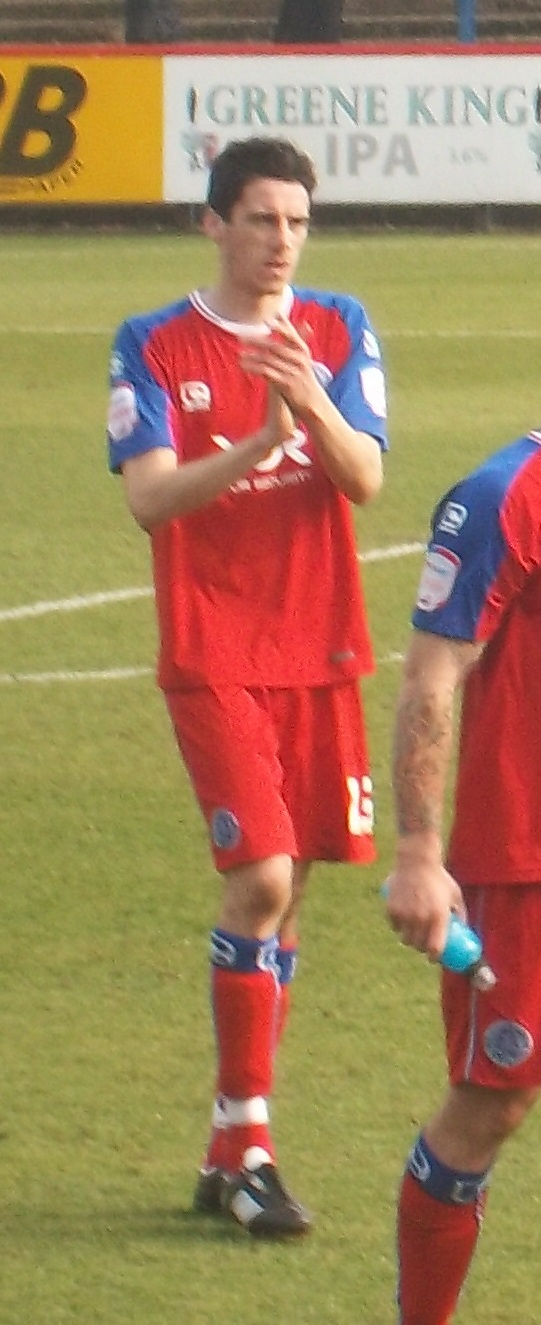
Vincenti playing for Aldershot Town in 2011

Vincenti signed for Aldershot Town on a free transfer on 14 January 2011, joining the League Two club on an 18-month contract. He was Dean Holdsworth's first signing for Aldershot, with Vincenti having previously played under Dean's brother, David, at Mansfield Town. He made his debut for Aldershot on 15 January 2011, playing 78 minutes in the club's 1–1 away draw at Bury. Vincenti scored his first goal for Aldershot a week later in a 3–2 home victory against Crewe Alexandra. He scored two goals within the space of a week in February 2011, scoring a late equaliser in a 1–1 draw with Northampton Town, followed by a consolation strike in a 2–1 home loss to Port Vale. Vincenti scored six goals in 22 appearances for Aldershot during the season, as the club finished 14th in League Two.

He remained at Aldershot for the 2011–12 season and scored his first goal of the season on 13 September 2011, heading in Alex Rodman's cross to double Aldershot's lead in a 2–0 away win at Hereford United. A month later, Vincenti scored in a 5–2 win against Dagenham & Redbridge on 22 October 2011. It was his final goal for nearly five months, ending a 21-match goal drought when he scored from just inside the area in a 2–2 draw with Crawley Town on 13 March 2012. Vincenti signed a one-year contract extension with Aldershot on 30 March 2012, keeping him at the club until June 2013. Vincenti made 49 appearances during the season, scoring six goals.

His third season at Aldershot began with a 7–6 penalty shootout defeat to Wolverhampton Wanderers at Molineux in the League Cup on 11 August 2012, with Vincenti playing the full 90 minutes of the match. It took him 20 matches to register his first goal of the season, scoring with a 30-yard shot just before half-time in Aldershot's 3–2 FA Cup victory away at Fleetwood Town on 1 December 2012. Vincenti made 46 appearances in his final season with the club, as Aldershot were relegated back to the Conference Premier after finishing bottom of League Two. During two and a half years at the Hampshire club, he scored 15 goals in 117 appearances in all competitions.

=== Rochdale ===
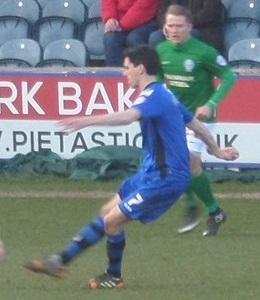
Vincenti playing for Rochdale in 2015

Shortly after the end of the 2012–13 season, on 10 May 2013, Vincenti agreed to join League Two club Rochdale on a two-year deal, following the expiration of his contract at Aldershot on 1 July 2013. He made his Rochdale debut in the club's opening match of the 2013–14 season, playing the full 90 minutes in a 3–0 win over Hartlepool United at Spotland on 3 August 2013. He scored his first goal for the club in a 3–0 win against Newport County on 12 October 2013, with "a stunning 30-yard strike". Vincenti also scored the opening goal of the match in a 2–0 victory against Cheltenham Town on 26 April 2014, a result that secured the club's promotion to League One after finishing in second place in League Two. Vincenti was a regular starter throughout the season, making 49 appearances and scoring seven goals in his first season with the club. Following the conclusion of the season, on 30 June 2014, Vincenti signed a contract extension until 2016.

He started the 2014–15 season by scoring four goals in the opening month, including two goals in a 4–0 away victory at Crawley Town on 6 September 2014. Vincenti's first-half goal in a 1–1 draw with Gillingham on 18 October 2014 would serve as the catalyst for one of the player's most prolific goalscoring runs of his career. He scored seven times in the club's next nine matches, including a penalty in Rochdale's 1–0 FA Cup victory against Championship club Nottingham Forest on 3 January 2015. Vincenti scored 16 times in 44 appearances during the season, finishing as the club's second-highest goalscorer that season, as Rochdale consolidated their position in League One with an eighth-place finish.

Ahead of the 2015–16 season, on 15 July 2015, Vincenti signed a two-year contract extension, keeping him at the club until 2018. As in the previous season, Vincenti went on a run of scoring seven times within the space of nine matches, spanning from August to October 2015. The run earned him the EFL League One Player of the Month for October 2015. Following this early-season scoring streak, Vincenti did not score again for four months, ending this run when he came on as a second-half substitute to open the scoring in an eventual 2–0 victory over Sheffield United on 27 February 2016. He played 43 times during the season, scoring eight goals, as Rochdale finished outside the play-off positions, placing tenth in League One.

A recurring ankle injury limited Vincenti to just four appearances in the opening half of the 2016–17 season. He underwent ankle surgery in October 2016, with the club estimating a recovery period of up to four months. Vincenti returned to the first team on 21 January 2017, coming on as a half-time substitute in Rochdale's 4–0 home defeat to Oxford United. He scored his only goal of the season in the club's 4–1 win over Gillingham on 18 March 2017. Vincenti made 16 appearances during the injury-disrupted season. During his four years at Rochdale, Vincenti scored 32 goals in 152 appearances, with the club gaining promotion and establishing themselves as a League One team during his time there.

=== Coventry City ===
Despite having a year remaining on his contract, Vincenti left Rochdale by mutual consent and signed a two-year contract with recently relegated League Two club Coventry City on 21 June 2017. Coventry manager Mark Robins cited Vincenti's versatility and experience as key factors in the decision to sign him. He made his debut in the club's opening match of the 2017–18 season, playing the full 90 minutes in a 3–0 win against Notts County at the Ricoh Arena. Vincenti scored his first goal in a 2–0 home victory against Carlisle United on 12 September 2017. He played much of the season with an ankle injury, which Robins stated would require surgery in the summer. Vincenti made 29 appearances during his only season at Coventry, scoring three goals, as the club won promotion to League One via the play-offs.

=== Macclesfield Town ===
Vincenti was released from his contract at Coventry ahead of the 2018–19 season to join newly promoted League Two club Macclesfield Town on a two-year deal on 9 August 2018. He made his debut for Macclesfield on 1 September 2018, appearing as a 79th-minute substitute in a 3–0 away loss to Crewe Alexandra. Vincenti scored his first goal for Macclesfield in the club's 4–1 away defeat to Accrington Stanley in the EFL Trophy on 9 October 2018. He scored in a 2–1 victory over Carlisle United on 20 October 2018. Vincenti's 83rd-minute winning goal in the game ended Macclesfield's run of 36 consecutive Football League matches without a win, dating back to their previous spell in League Two in 2012, and prevented the club from setting a new record for the longest winless run in Football League history. The goal proved to be Vincenti's last of the season, and he did not appear for Macclesfield during the second half of the season. Vincenti made 19 appearances for the club, scoring twice.

Having not played first-team football for eight months, Vincenti joined National League North club Hereford on a loan deal until January, on 20 September 2019. A day later, he scored on his debut in a 5–2 home victory over Truro City in the FA Cup. He scored five times in 15 appearances during the loan agreement. Vincenti departed Macclesfield upon the expiry of his contract in June 2020.

=== Return to Jersey ===
Without a club at the start of the 2020–21 season, Vincenti returned to his hometown and began training with St. Peter, the club he first represented at senior level, in September 2020. He signed an initial short-term contract while seeking employment on the island. He made his second debut in St. Peter's 2–2 draw with St. Brelade's in the Wheway Memorial Trophy on 30 September 2020, which St. Peter ultimately won 8–7 in a penalty shootout. Vincenti made 17 appearances and scored four goals during the 2022–23 season, as St. Peter secured the Jersey Football Combination title, as well as the Upton Park Trophy. The following season, St. Peter won the Jeremie Cup and Wheway Memorial Trophy with Vincenti scoring once in 17 appearances.

== International career ==
In March 2004, Vincenti represented Jersey's under-18 team in their first international fixture, a 1–1 draw against Northern Ireland. He was later selected for the senior team at the 2007 Island Games, finishing as Jersey's top goalscorer in the tournament, and being named Jersey Footballer of the Year the same year.

== Style of play ==
Vincenti has described himself as a "utility player" and considers his versatility as an asset. Upon signing him for Coventry City, manager Mark Robins highlighted Vincenti's adaptability as a primary reason for the acquisition. Vincenti stated that his preferred position is as an attacking midfielder, where he can "make late runs into the box and hope to get on the end of any crosses". Also comfortable playing in central midfield and as a forward, Vincenti emphasised a willingness to "play anywhere the manager tells him to". He considers his height to be an attacking advantage, particularly when arriving late into the penalty area. Mansfield Town manager David Holdsworth noted that Vincenti's stature "means he is very much a threat from set pieces".

== Coaching career ==
A UEFA B Licence coach, Vincenti was appointed academy director at St. Peter on 24 January 2021, later becoming the club's head of academy. He stepped down from the role in February 2024, due to his responsibilities as vice-chairman of the Professional Footballers' Association. St. Peter stated that Vincenti would continue to act in an advisory capacity to the academy, as well as serve as a coach.

== Personal life ==
Following his return to Jersey at the conclusion of his professional playing career, Vincenti began working in the finance industry, initially with the Sanne Group before moving to JTC Group in 2023. He is also a qualified referee.

== Career statistics ==
As of match played on 6 May 2026

Appearances and goals by club, season and competition
Club	Season	League			FA Cup		League Cup		Other		Total	
Club	Season	Division	Apps	Goals	Apps	Goals	Apps	Goals	Apps	Goals	Apps	Goals
Millwall	2007–08	League One	0	0	0	0	0	0	0	0	0	0
Stevenage	2007–08	Conference Premier	12	1	—		—		—		12	1
Stevenage	2008–09	Conference Premier	26	3	2	0	—		6 (Note: Five appearances and one goal in FA Trophy; one appearance in Conference League Cup)	1	34	4
Stevenage	2009–10	Conference Premier	21	0	3	1	—		2 (Note: Appearances in FA Trophy)	0	26	1
Stevenage	2010–11	League Two	5	1	—		0	0	0	0	5	1
Stevenage	Total		64	5	5	1	0	0	8	1	77	7
Mansfield Town (loan)	2010–11	Conference Premier	3	0	1	0	—		—		4	0
Aldershot Town	2010–11	League Two	22	6	—		—		—		22	6
Aldershot Town	2011–12	League Two	42	6	2	0	4	0	1 (Note: Appearance(s) in EFL Trophy)	0	49	6
Aldershot Town	2012–13	League Two	39	2	4	1	1	0	2	0	46	3
Aldershot Town	Total		103	14	6	1	5	0	3	0	117	15
Rochdale	2013–14	League Two	42	5	4	2	1	0	2	0	49	7
Rochdale	2014–15	League One	37	13	4	2	1	0	2	1	44	16
Rochdale	2015–16	League One	38	8	2	0	2	0	1	0	43	8
Rochdale	2016–17	League One	14	1	1	0	0	0	1	0	16	1
Rochdale	Total		131	27	11	4	4	0	6	1	152	32
Coventry City	2017–18	League Two	24	3	2	0	0	0	3	0	29	3
Macclesfield Town	2018–19	League Two	16	1	1	0	0	0	2	1	19	2
Macclesfield Town	2019–20	League Two	0	0	0	0	0	0	0	0	0	0
Macclesfield Town	Total		16	1	1	0	0	0	2	1	19	2
Hereford (loan)	2019–20	National League North	13	4	2	1	—		0	0	15	5
St. Peter	2020–21	Jersey Football Combination	9	3	—		—		3 (Note: Appearances in Wheway Memorial Trophy)	1	12	4
St. Peter	2021–22	Jersey Football Combination	9	1	—		—		6	2	15	3
St. Peter	2022–23	Jersey Football Combination	9	4	—		—		8	0	17	4
St. Peter	2023–24	Jersey Football Combination	12	1	—		—		5	0	17	1
St. Peter	2024–25	Jersey Football Combination	7	2	—		—		1 (Note: Appearance(s) in Jersey Charity Cup)	1	8	3
St. Peter	2025–26	Jersey Football Combination	14	7	—		—		3 (Note: One appearance in Jersey Charity Cup; two appearances in Jersey FA Cup)	0	17	7
St. Peter	Total		60	18	0	0	0	0	26	4	86	22
Career totals			412	72	28	7	9	0	48	7	497	86

== Honours ==
Stevenage Borough

- Conference Premier: 2009–10
- FA Trophy: 2008–09; runner-up: 2009–10

Rochdale

- Football League Two second-place promotion: 2013–14

Coventry City

- EFL League Two play-offs: 2018

St. Peter

- Jersey Football Combination: 2022–23
- Upton Park Trophy: 2023
- Jeremie Cup: 2024
- Wheway Memorial Trophy: 2024

Individual

- Football League One Player of the Month: October 2015
