= Jack Boyle (footballer) =

Jèrriais footballer (born 1990)

Personal information
- Date of birth: 1990 (age 35–36)
- Place of birth: Jersey
- Position: Winger

Team information
- Current team: Jersey Bulls

Youth career
- 2008–2010: Southampton

Senior career*
Years	Team	Apps	(Gls)
2011	Salisbury City		
2012	Jersey Scottish		
2012–2013	Airdrie United	13	(1)
- Jersey Scottish
- St. Paul's
2019–	Jersey Bulls	1	(0)

International career^{‡}
2017–	Jersey	4+	
2018–	Parishes of Jersey	1	(1)
- * Club domestic league appearances and goals as of 19:05, 24 October 2018 (UTC) ‡ National team caps and goals as of 19:05, 24 October 2018 (UTC)

Jack Boyle (born 1990) is a Jèrriais footballer who plays as a winger for Jersey Bulls in the Combined Counties Football League Division One.

== Club career ==
After trialling with Oldham Athletic in February 2008, Boyle signed a six-month contract with Southampton in November 2008. He left the club in May 2010, following injury, and signed for Salisbury City in January 2011. After playing back in Jersey for Jersey Scottish, Boyle signed for Scottish club Airdrie United in August 2012. He left the club in March 2013, following injury, having made 14 appearances in all competitions for the club.

By May 2017 he had returned to Jersey Scottish. By August 2018 he was playing for St. Paul's.

In 2019–20 he was playing for the newly formed Jersey Bulls in the Combined Counties Football League Division One.

== International career ==
He was a squad member for Jersey at the 2017 Island Games.

In October 2018, he made his debut for the Parishes of Jersey football team as captain, scoring on his debut as they beat Yorkshire 2–1.
