= St. John F.C. =

Association football club in Jersey

Coordinates: 49.244252°N 2.120137°W

St. John
- Founded: 1919
- Ground: St John's Recreation Centre
- Capacity: 1,800
- League: Jersey Football Combination Premiership
- 2024–25: Jersey Football Combination Premiership 2, 2nd of 7 (promoted)
- Website: http://www.clubwebsite.com/stjohnsfc123/310720/Home

St. John F.C. is a football club based in Jersey in the Channel Islands, which was founded in 1919. They are affiliated with the Jersey Football Association and play in the Jersey Football Combination Premiership. Their ground hosted matches during the 2015 Island Games, including a match between Jersey and the Isle of Man which attracted 1,800 fans. Jersey born YouTuber Chris Dixon (known by his online alias ChrisMD) played for St. John F.C. and created a series of videos about his and the club's past seasons. On 22 July 2017, St. John played Isthmian League side Hashtag United in an exhibition match at Springfield Stadium which was won by Hashtag 3–1.
