= St. Martin F.C. =

Association football club in Jersey

Coordinates: 49.220702°N 2.055421°W

St. Martin
- Full name: St. Martin Football Club
- Founded: 1894
- Ground: St Martin's School, St. Martin
- 2013-14: Jersey Football Combination Premiership 7th of 9

St. Martin F.C. was a football club based on the Channel Island of Jersey. They were affiliated to the Jersey Football Association.

== History ==
St. Martin F.C. was founded in 1894 in the parish of St. Martin, Jersey, establishing it as the island's oldest continuously operating football club and one of the earliest in the Channel Islands.

They historically participated in local leagues, including the Jersey Saturday Football League where the club won titles in the 1942–43 and 1943–44 seasons and shared the 1972-73 championship. A notable aspect of its history occurred during the German occupation of Jersey in World War II, when the team defeated a side from the occupying forces 3–2 and 3–0 in 1943 matches.

The 1930s and 40s saw the club winning the Le Riche Cup three times.

In 2004 the club merged with Sporting Club Francais to form St Martin Sporting Club Francais, which continued until February 2012 when they club's officials decided to end their amalgamation.

The club also faced losing their ground in the same year after the school applied for permission to rebuild the school on the club's pitch. They did subsequently lose their pitch, and in 2015 struggled to recruit players before making a decision to pull out of the league.

The club continued as an Over 35's team.

== Honours ==
- Jersey Saturday Football League – Champions (3): 1942–43, 1943–33, 1972–73 (shared)
- Le Riche Cup – Winners (3): 1937, 1944, 1946
- Dog Club Trophy – Winners (5): 1932, 1936, 1954, 1961, 1971
