= Grouville F.C. =

Association football club in Jersey

Coordinates: 49.188043°N 2.062749°W

Grouville
- Full name: Grouville Football Club
- Founded: 1882
- Ground: Le Boulivot, Grouville
- Manager: Mike Rossano Teruggi
- League: Jersey Football Combination Premiership
- 2025–26: 4th of 8
- Website: http://www.grouville-fc.co.uk/

Grouville Football Club is a football club based on the Channel Island of Jersey. They are affiliated to the Jersey Football Association and play in the Jersey Football Combination Premiership.

The 2024–25 season saw Grouville F.C. claim its first ever Premiership 1 title, as well as win the Le Riche Cup. As winners of the Premiership 1 they subsequently made their first appearance in the Upton Park Trophy game at Springfield Stadium in St Helier, Jersey, against Priaulx League champion St. Martins A.C., who Grouville would lose to 1-0.

== Honours ==
- Jersey Football Combination Premiership – Champions: 2024–25
- Le Riche Cup – Winners (10): 1953, 1959, 1960, 1961. 1962, 1963. 1971, 2005, 2022, 2024
- Jersey Football Combination Championship - Champions (2): 2022-23 (Reserves), 2023-24 (Reserves)
