= Trinity F.C. =

Association football club in Jersey

Coordinates: 49.229215°N 2.095581°W

Trinity
- Full name: Trinity Football Club
- Nickname: Trinogs
- Founded: 1930
- Ground: The Riley Field, Trinity
- Chairman: Joey Morley
- Manager: Tim Aubert
- League: Jersey Football Combination Premiership 2
- 2025–26: Jersey Football Combination Premiership 2, 5th of 7
- Website: www.trinityfootballclub.com

Trinity F.C. is a football club based on the Channel Island of Jersey. They are affiliated to the Jersey Football Association and play in the Jersey Football Combination Premiership.

== History ==
Trinty Football and Social Club are based at Riley Field, opposite Trinity School in Jersey. The club formed in 1930, making the team part of Jersey's football history.

== Stadium ==
Riley Field, opposite Trinity School in Jersey.

== Honours ==
- Le Riche Cup – Winners (2): 1976, 2003
- Tradesmens Cup – 2026
