= Sol Solomon =

Jèrriais footballer

Personal information
- Full name: Sol William Leonard Solomon
- Date of birth: 17 March 2001 (age 25)
- Height: 1.78 m (5 ft 10 in)
- Position: Forward

Team information
- Current team: Southport
- Number: 9

Youth career
- St. Peter

Senior career*
| Years | Team | Apps | (Gls) |
| 2018–2019 | St. Peter | | |
| 2019–2022 | Jersey Bulls | 71 | (60) |
| 2022–2024 | Marine | 62 | (29) |
| 2024–2026 | Tranmere Rovers | 27 | (2) |
| 2026– | Southport | 0 | (0) |

International career
- Jersey U18
- Jersey U21
| 2023– | Jersey | 5 | (3) |
- * Club domestic league appearances and goals as of 14:52, 27 May 2026 (UTC)

Sol William Leonard Solomon is a Jèrriais footballer who plays as a forward for National League North club Southport.

A youth product of St. Peter, Solomon left for Jersey Bulls in 2019 and became their record goalscorer over the course of three years, having scored 60 goals in 71 games in the Combined Counties Football League. He subsequently joined National League North side Marine, before joining League Two club Tranmere Rovers. Following the expiry of his contract, he joined National League North side Southport.

== Club career ==
Solomon began his football career playing for St. Peter on the Channel Island of Jersey, before joining Jersey Bulls after a season.

=== Jersey Bulls ===
Whilst still a teenager, Solomon scored fifteen goals in his first twenty games for the side telling BBC Sport in September 2020: "Playing for the Bulls is great for me personally because as a squad we demand so much from each other and you know you can't drop your performance around them."

Solomon kept playing for Jersey Bulls during the 2021–22 season, even after he enrolled at University in Liverpool, and would try and fly back to Jersey for games. He then switched his academic studies to Highlands College, Jersey, telling BBC Radio Jersey "I tried to play as many games as I could, like I was doing before when I was at university, but it was a bit hard flying back every weekend." Solomon achieved a degree of viral media attention for a goal he scored goal against Sutton Common Rovers in the FA Cup in 2021, which was described as a “mid-air back-heeled volley”. Solomon finished the 2021-22 season having scored 38 goals in the campaign.

Solomon had trials with Luton Town early in 2022, however, it was not until September 2022 that he left Jersey Bulls for Marine who play two divisions higher in the English football pyramid. He played the final game of his spell at Jersey Bulls on 24 September 2022. He left the club having become Jersey Bull’s highest ever goal scorer, with a record 60 goals in 71 games in the Combined Counties Football League.

=== Marine ===
Solomon scored his first goals for Marine when he netted a brace away at Whitby Town on 20 October 2022 in a Northern Premier League fixture. He played in the 2023 Liverpool Senior Cup final, which Marine won on penalties against Runcorn Linnets. In the 2023–24 season, he played and scored in the Liverpool Senior Cup final against City of Liverpool, which Marine won 2–0, and played a part in Marine's promotion to the National League North via the playoffs. He turned down a new contract at Marine in 2024.

=== Tranmere Rovers ===
On 1 July 2024, Tranmere Rovers announced the signing of Solomon on an initial one-year contract. He picked up his first league goal for the club in a 3-1 away defeat to Doncaster Rovers on 21 December 2024. On 12 May 2026, the club announced he would be leaving in the summer once his contract expired.

=== Southport ===
Following the expiry of his contract at Tranmere, it was announced on 19 June 2026 that Solomon had signed for Southport.

== International career ==
In May 2018, Solomon represented Jersey's under-18 in the Junior Muratti against their counterparts from Guernsey, having played for Jersey's under-21's a month prior.

On April 27 2019, he played in a match against the Solomon Islands U17s, scoring a brace in a match that Jersey U18s lost 3-2.

In the summer of 2023, Solomon represented Jersey at the 2023 Island Games, scoring three goals as Jersey won the competition.

== Personal life ==
He is a fan of Liverpool and Rangers through family connections.
