= Jersey official football team =

Association football team representing Jersey

Jersey
- Nickname: Crapauds or Beans
- Association: Jersey Football Association
- Head coach: Jack Cannon
- Most caps: Greg Curtis (55)
- Top scorer: Mike Harper (24)
- Home stadium: Springfield Stadium
- FIFA code: JER
| First colours | Second colours | Third colours |

First international
- Jersey 0–1 Guernsey (Saint Helier, Jersey; 27 April 1905)

Biggest win
- Jersey 18–0 Alderney (Saint Helier, Jersey; 19 March 1994)

Biggest defeat
- Jersey 1–7 Guernsey (Saint Helier, Jersey; 18 April 1929)

The Jersey official football team represents the British Crown Dependency of Jersey in non-FIFA international matches.

The Jersey Football Association is affiliated to the English Football Association.

Jersey's main football stadium is Springfield Stadium located in Saint Helier, Jersey. Matches have been played at that site for over a century; the current stadium has grandstand capacity for 982.

== Channel Islands competitions ==
The Jersey Men's Team's main fixtures are currently the annual Muratti Vase against fellow Channel Islanders Alderney and Guernsey. As of the 2025 Muratti Vase, Jersey has won the tournament 57 times out of the 107 times the tournament has been held.

== Island Games ==
The team participates in the biennial Island Games, having first entered in the 1991 Island Games. They have won the competition on four occasions, in 1993, 1997, 2009, and 2023.

== UEFA and FIFA national team competitions ==
As they are not affiliated to either FIFA or UEFA, the Jersey official football team is not eligible to take part in qualification for both the FIFA World Cup and the European Football Championship.

Players from Jersey are however known to be eligible for all four Home Nations national teams (England, Scotland, Wales, and Northern Ireland) in those competitions. Graeme Le Saux chose England among those options.

In December 2015 an application was submitted to UEFA to allow Jersey to take part in international matches, following on from Gibraltar's admission two years earlier. In October 2016, Jersey's bid to join UEFA was rejected, but this decision was appealed to the Court of Arbitration for Sport (CAS) in June 2017. In September 2017, the CAS ordered the UEFA Congress to hear Jersey's case. In February 2018 a majority of the member associations of UEFA voted against admitting Jersey as a member. An independent Parishes of Jersey team subsequently formed in August 2018, joining ConIFA in September that year.

In 2023, it was rumoured by Greenland Manager Morten Rutkjær, that Jersey were interested in joining CONCACAF.

== FA Inter-League Cup ==
A technically separate team operated by the island's top league, the Jersey Football Combination, have entered several editions of the FA Inter-League Cup against representative teams of various English tier 11 leagues and Crown Dependency leagues, winning the cup twice (2011–12 and 2019–20) and qualifying for an international UEFA tournament, the UEFA Regions' Cup, by virtue of that. Their best placement in the Regions' Cup has been being 2nd in their group in the 2013 UEFA Regions' Cup intermediary round. Many players have played on both Jersey teams, and some have played on both teams and on the Jersey Bulls that have entered the English league systems.

Players known to have played in the 2023 Island Games, the 2023 UEFA Regions' Cup, and for the Bulls in the 2024–25 Combined Counties Football League season include Adam Trotter, Euan van der Vliet, Jay Giles, Jonny Le Quesne, and Luke Campbell.

== Current squad ==
Squad was picked for the 2023 Island Games in July 2023.

| No. | Pos. | Player | Date of birth (age) | Caps | Club |
|---|---|---|---|---|---|
| | GK | Euan van der Vliet | 11 August 1996 (aged 26) | | Jersey Bulls |
| | GK | Pierce Roche | 1 January 2005 (aged 18) | | Jersey Bulls |
| | DF | Jay Giles | 22 November 1995 (aged 27) | | Jersey Bulls |
| | DF | Luke Campbell | 4 May 1989 (aged 34) | | Jersey Bulls |
| | DF | James Carr | 28 December 2001 (aged 21) | | Jersey Bulls |
| | DF | Paul McCafferty | 1 January 2000 (aged 23) | | Jersey Bulls |
| | DF | Harry Curtis | 23 February 1999 (aged 24) | | Jersey Bulls |
| | DF | James Queree | 23 July 1990 (aged 32) | | (Jersey) St. Brelade |
| | MF | Miguel Carvalho | 18 June 2005 (aged 18) | | Jersey Bulls |
| | MF | Joe Kilshaw | 8 August 2000 (aged 22) | | Jersey Bulls |
| | MF | Luke Watson | 29 January 1987 (aged 36) | | Jersey Bulls |
| | MF | Toby Ritzema | 1 January 2002 (aged 21) | | (England) Basford United |
| | MF | Jonny Le Quesne | 12 December 1996 (aged 26) | | Jersey Bulls |
| | MF | Francis Lekimamati | 1 January 1997 (aged 26) | | Jersey Bulls |
| | FW | Lorne Bickley | 9 January 1998 (aged 25) | | Jersey Bulls |
| | FW | Sol Solomon | 17 March 2001 (aged 22) | | (England) Tranmere Rovers |
| | FW | Karl Hinds | 10 December 1998 (aged 24) | | Jersey Bulls |
| | FW | Adam Trotter | 15 January 1996 (aged 27) | | Jersey Bulls |

=== Recent call-ups ===
The following players have also been called up to the Jersey squad within the last twelve months.

| No. | Pos. | Player | Date of birth (age) | Caps | Club |
|---|---|---|---|---|---|
| | GK | Danny Birrell | 4 April 2000 (aged 23) | | Jersey Wanderers |
| | DF | Michael Weir | 18 February 1991 (aged 32) | | (Jersey) St. Paul's |
| | DF | Stuart Andre | 18 March 1984 (aged 39) | | (Jersey) St. Paul's FmmSt.Paul's |
| | MF | Jack Cannon | 17 February 1987 (aged 36) | | (Jersey) St. Paul's |
| | MF | Jay Reid | 29 October 1990 (aged 32) | | (Jersey) St.Paul's |
| | MF | Jack Boyle | 9 July 1990 (aged 33) | | Jersey Bulls |
| | MF | Jake Baker | 9 December 1992 (aged 30) | | (Jersey) St. Peter |
| | MF | Kamen Nafkha | 28 November 1998 (aged 24) | | Jersey Wanderers |
| | MF | Cav Miley | 29 April 1995 (aged 28) | | (England) Southend United |
| | MF | Ben Gallichan | 12 August 1988 (aged 34) | | (Jersey) St. Peter |
| | FW | Kieran Lester | 19 July 1991 (aged 31) | | (Jersey) St. Paul's |
| | FW | Craig Russell | 4 November 1987 (aged 35) | | (Jersey) St. Paul's |

== Honours ==
- Muratti Vase: 58 (57 outright, 1 shared)
  - 1908, 1910, 1911, 1921, 1924, 1926, 1928, 1931, 1937*, 1939, 1947, 1948, 1949, 1953, 1955, 1956, 1958, 1959, 1960, 1961, 1962, 1963, 1964, 1965, 1967, 1968, 1970, 1971, 1973, 1976, 1977, 1981, 1982, 1984, 1986, 1987, 1989, 1990, 1993, 1994, 1995, 1996, 1998, 2000, 2002, 2003, 2004, 2006, 2007, 2008, 2009, 2011, 2015, 2016, 2018, 2019, 2022, 2023 (* shared)
- Island Games: 4
  - 1993, 1997, 2009, 2023
- FA Inter League Champions
  - 2021

== Youth teams ==
Jersey under-16s have competed in their own Muratti Cup since 2007.

=== Honours ===
- U-16 Muratti Cup: 2007, 2008, 2009, 2010, 2014, 2015 (shared), 2016, 2018, 2019, 2022

== Women's team ==
Beginning in 1997, the Jersey official women's team have competed in their version of the Muratti Vase against the Guernsey women's team. The competition was paused when the Guernsey women's team was disbanded in 2017, then resumed six years later.

=== Honours ===
- Island Games: 2015
- Muratti Cup: 2002, 2003, 2004, 2005, 2006, 2007, 2009, 2010, 2011, 2012, 2013, 2014, 2015, 2016, 2022, 2023

== See also ==
- Parishes of Jersey football team
- Jersey Bulls F.C.
