= Sporting Academics F.C. =

Association football club in Jersey

Coordinates: 49.204673°N 2.063652°W

Sporting Academics
- Full name: Sporting Academics F. C.
- Nickname: Accies
- Founded: 1973
- Ground: Inverness John Bathe Field, La Rue du Trot, St Saviour, Jersey
- Chairman: John North
- League: Jersey Football Combination Premiership 2
- 2025–26: Jersey Football Combination Premiership 2, 2nd of 7
Home colours

Sporting Academics F.C. is a football club based on the Channel Island of Jersey. They are affiliated to the Jersey Football Association and play in the Jersey Football Combination Premiership 2.
