= St. Lawrence F.C. =

Association football club in Jersey

Coordinates: 49.219006°N 2.139439°W

St. Lawrence
- Full name: St. Lawrence Football Club
- Founded: 1919
- Ground: Three Oaks, Saint Lawrence
- Capacity: 1,000
- League: Jersey Football Combination Premiership 2
- 2025-26: Jersey Football Combination Premiership 2, 7th of 7
- Website: http://www.stlawrencefc.com/

St. Lawrence F.C. is a football club based on the Channel Island of Jersey, United Kingdom. They are affiliated to the Jersey Football Association and play in the Jersey Football Combination Premiership 2.
