= Michael Weir (footballer) =

Jèrriais footballer (born 1991)

Personal information
- Full name: Michael John Weir
- Date of birth: 18 February 1991 (age 35)
- Place of birth: Jersey
- Height: 1.81 m (5 ft 11 in)
- Position: Defender

Team information
- Current team: St. Paul's

Youth career
- 2004–2006: Southampton
- 2008–2010: Nacional

Senior career*
Years	Team	Apps	(Gls)
2010–2012	Nacional	0	(0)
2010–2012	→ Camacha (loan)	49	(0)
2012–2013	Doxa	10	(0)
2013–2014	Bognor Regis Town	2	(0)
2014	Dulwich Hamlet	6	(0)
2014	Bognor Regis Town		
2014	Ontinyent	2	(0)
2015–	St. Paul's		

International career^{‡}
2009–	Jersey	3+	(0)
2018–	Parishes of Jersey	1	(0)
- * Club domestic league appearances and goals as of 5 April 2013 ‡ National team caps and goals as of 16:20, 21 October 2018 (UTC)

Michael John Weir (born 18 February 1991) is a Jèrriais footballer who plays as a defender for St. Paul's.

== Club career ==
Weir spent two years with the Southampton academy between 2004 and 2006 before agreeing a two-year scholarship deal with Portuguese side Nacional in March 2008. After two years, Weir spent two seasons out on loan at Campeonato de Portugal side Camacha. In May 2012, Weir joined Cypriot top-flight side Doxa. In the summer of 2014, Weir joined Spanish side Ontinyent, playing two league matches before leaving the club in October.

== International career ==
Weir represented Jersey at the 2009 Island Games, playing three matches on the way to winning the gold medal in the men's football competition. In 2018, whilst playing for St. Paul's, Weir was called up to the new Parishes of Jersey football team for their fixture against Yorkshire.
