= Sammy Henia-Kamau =

Kenyan footballer

Personal information
- Full name: Samuel Anthony Henia Kamau
- Date of birth: 17 February 2006 (age 20)
- Place of birth: Jersey
- Position: Forward

Team information
- Current team: Jersey Bulls

Youth career
- Jersey Bulls
- 2023–2025: Swansea City
- 2025–2026: Hull City

Senior career*
Years	Team	Apps	(Gls)
2026–	Jersey Bulls		

International career^{‡}
2026–	Kenya	1	(0)
- * Club domestic league appearances and goals as of 16:42, 8 June 2026 (UTC) ‡ National team caps and goals as of 16:42, 8 June 2026 (UTC)

Samuel Anthony Henia Kamau (born 17 February 2006) is a footballer who plays as a forward for Jersey Bulls Born in England, Henia-Kamau plays for the Kenya national team.

== Club career ==
Henia-Kamau began his football development at Jersey Bulls, where he quickly established himself as a prolific goalscorer, netting 20 goals in 15 matches for the club's under-16 side and six more for the under-18s. He became the youngest player in the club's history to score a hat-trick for the senior team, and in June 2022 won the Sid Guy Award for the most outstanding player at the Jersey FA Centre of Excellence.

In July 2023, his form earned him a scholarship at Swansea City, where he joined the under-18 side and scored a hat-trick against rivals Cardiff City in the Under-18 Professional Development League Cup, helping Swansea reach the final. He finished his debut season with 10 goals before stepping up to the under-21 side, featuring in the Professional Development League, Premier League Cup, and Welsh League Cup.

In August 2025, after impressing in two appearances as an unnamed trialist for Hull City under-21s in matches against Cardiff and Millwall at the end of the 2024–25 season, Henia-Kamau signed a one-year contract with Hull City, with the club holding an option for an additional year. Hull City's Lead Professional Development Phase Coach Conor Sellars described him as having made a strong impression during his trial, showing excellent qualities in both training and matches. He scored 4 goals for Hull City's under-21 side during the 2025–26 season, also netting a free-kick against Grimsby Borough during pre-season.

On 10 June 2026, Hull said it was releasing the player.

Following his release by Hull City Henia-Kamau resigned for Jersey Bulls.

== International career ==
Born in England to an English mother and a Kenyan father from Makadara, Nairobi, Henia-Kamau opted to represent Kenya. In May 2026, he received his first senior call-up to the Harambee Stars, named in the squad by head coach Benni McCarthy as one of five uncapped players selected ahead of upcoming 2027 AFCON qualifying fixtures, with friendlies against Kyrgyzstan and Palestine scheduled for the June window.
