= Jersey Portuguese F.C. =

Association football club in Jersey

Coordinates: 49.195349°N 2.204456°W

Jersey Portuguese
- Full name: Jersey Portuguese Football Club
- Nickname: The Grease Monkeys
- Founded: 1971
- Ground: Les Quennevais Sports Centre, St. Brelade
- League: Jersey Football Combination Premiership
- 2016-17: 8th of 8 (relegated)

Jersey Portuguese F.C. is a football club based on the Channel Island of Jersey. They are affiliated to the Jersey Football Association. They formerly played in the Jersey Football Combination Championship.

The club was formed in 1971 and played in the Jersey Football League and its successor, the Jersey Football Combination.

In the 2015–16 season the club were handed a suspended sentence by the Jersey Football Association for repeated disciplinary issues, which saw them threatened with being expelled from the league for any re-occurrences. In April 2017 they were involved in an on-pitch brawl which saw the club investigated again. The outcome of this investigation saw the club suspended from football on the island for a year. In June 2020 it was reported that the club was considering a return for the 2020–21 season.

The club, known as Portuguese Football Club of Jersey, competes in the Over 35’s League.
