= Jersey Bulls F.C. =

Association football club in the Channel Islands

Jersey Bulls
- Full name: Jersey Bulls Football Club
- Nickname: The Bulls
- Founded: 7 August 2018
- Ground: Springfield Stadium, Saint Helier
- Capacity: 2,000 (982 seated)
- Chairman: Russell Le Feuvre
- Manager: Elliot Powell
- League: Isthmian League South Central Division
- 2025–26: Isthmian League South East Division, 3rd of 22 (transferred)
- Website: bulls.je
Home colours	Away colours	Third colours

Jersey Bulls Football Club is a football club located in Saint Helier, Jersey, Channel Islands. They are currently members of the Isthmian League South Central Division. They play at Springfield Stadium.

== History ==
Location of Jersey

The Jersey Football Combination, operated by the Jersey Football Association, has been the top level of football in the island of Jersey since 1975 and operates with 13 teams in two leagues, Premiership and Championship. Although affiliated with The Football Association, the league does not form part of the English football league system with teams unable to progress from the Jersey Football Combination or enter any cups, unless invited. The league leaders from Jersey would play the league leaders from the Guernsey Priaulx League in the Upton Park Trophy.

In 2015 the Jersey Football Association applied to UEFA and FIFA to allow them to play other teams, in a similar arrangement to Gibraltar. This was rejected on the basis Jersey was not an independent country. A Parishes of Jersey football team was formed and applied and accepted to ConIFA to play international matches with other teams not able to join UEFA and FIFA.

Jersey Bulls Football Club was formed on 7 August 2018, and in September it was announced that the club would apply to join the English football league system, via The Football Association. In November 2018, The Football Association approved the club's bid to join Division One of the Combined Counties League for the 2019–20 season.

Former Muratti Vase winner Gary Freeman was appointed as the club's first manager in January 2019. Freeman was manager at St Peter from February 2015 and took on the Jersey Bulls role from the end of the 2018–19 season.

The first eight fixtures of the league were announced by the Combined Counties Football League on 5 June to allow clubs preparation in booking transport to or from Jersey, with Ash United being the first team to visit Jersey and Deportivo Galicia being the first away fixture.

Jersey Bulls announced on 13 June 2019 that they had signed 30 players at the beginning of the season with all players dual registered with their current clubs in Jersey.

=== Abandoned 2019–20 season ===
The 2019–20 season started with two friendly games, the first with League Two side Stevenage on 6 July which was won by Stevenage 3–4, followed by Leicester City Under-23's on 16 July won by Leicester 3–0.

Their 2019–20 league campaign in the Combined Counties League Division One began with a 3–0 win over Ash United. By 16 November they had 15 straight victories in all competitions. Their 16th victory came on 23 November in a 7–0 victory, and after their 19th victory on 16 December they were 24 points clear at the top of the table. They ended 2019 with their 20th straight victory, despite their flight being delayed by two hours and the coach being delayed in traffic and running onto the pitch straight from the coach, they beat Farnham Town 2–0 and began 2020 with another victory, their 21st straight win.

On 7 March 2020, Forward Lorne Bickley signed a short-term contract with National League side Hartlepool United. The next day Jersey Bulls set a new record in the Combined Counties League on 27 consecutive wins, beating Withdean 2000's record which was set during the 2002–03 season. With 81 points on the table, they were statistically eligible for promotion to step 5 football. A few days later, most sporting leagues in the United Kingdom were halted due to the COVID-19 pandemic. It was later confirmed that the Combined Counties League had been abandoned with all results null and voided. On 30 March 2020, Jersey Bulls were one of sixty-six non-league clubs who sent an open letter to the Football Association requesting that they reconsider their decision. The request within this letter was denied and Jersey Bulls would return to Division One for the 2020–21 season.

=== 2020–21 season ===
On 5 September, Jersey Bulls began their second season in Division One away to Bedford & Feltham with a 4–1 victory. The Bulls subsequently defeated British Airways 2–0, Fleet Spurs 1-0 and Ash United 3–2, all away from home. Jersey Bulls are again unbeaten in Division One as of 1 January 2021, extending their unbeaten run to 31 games under inaugural manager Gary Freeman. In March the Football Association announced that the 2020–21 season at Step 3 to step 7 would be curtailed, prematurely ending Jersey Bulls' second season in Division One again. However, the FA later confirmed that the planned restructuring of the National League System would take place as planned, with teams allowed to apply for promotion.

=== 2021 to present ===
Jersey Bulls were promoted into the new Premier Division South for the 2021–22 season, finishing 4th. They improved to 3rd for the 2022–23 season. In the 2023-24 season they achieved 2nd place and entered the playoffs but were eliminated by AFC Croydon Athletic.

On the night prior to the final match of the 2024–25 season, Jersey Bulls were deducted three points for fielding an ineligible player, this deduction seeing them move from first position to third.

They went on to finish second in the league, eventually facing Fleet Town in a crucial play-off match. The game ended 1–1 after regular time, leading to a penalty shootout in which Jersey's goalkeeper, Euan Van De Vliet, delivered a standout performance by saving all three penalties, securing a 3–0 shootout victory and the Man Of The Match Award.

On 28 May 2025, Jersey clinched promotion with a 2–1 victory over fifth-placed Cobham in the play-off final—a match originally scheduled to be played over a month earlier. Forward Lorne Bickley was among the goalscorers on the night, helping the side earn promotion to the Isthmian League South East Division for the 2025–26 season.

This triumph also confirmed Jersey as the highest-ranked football team in the Channel Islands, following Guernsey FC’s relegation from the same division that year.

== Colours and badge ==
In September 2018, the club announced their logo and kit, stating:

"Our logo and proposed home kit, reflects our proud Jersey roots and the island's dairy heritage. Jersey may be most famous for its cows, but they'd be nowhere without the bulls. The bull is animated to show our passion for football, passion for Jersey and its community, and our desire to make this football club succeed. The kit and logo is red and white, obvious Jersey colours, and also includes a nod to the Jersey flag."

The home kit is a white shirt with a red cross, resembling the Flag of Jersey, with red shorts and socks, whilst the away kit is a red shirt with white shorts and socks. In April 2020, The Bulls launched a competition to choose the third kit and the winning designed was announced on 1 May 2020 on their social media as a dark blue shirt with pink trim, based on the colours of their second biggest sponsor, Butterfield Bank.

=== Kit suppliers and shirt sponsors ===
Period	Kit supplier	Shirt sponsor
2019–2020	Kappa	CPA Global
2021–2022	Kappa	SHUFL Capital
2023–2026	Kappa	JTC Group
2026–Present	Adidas	JTC Group

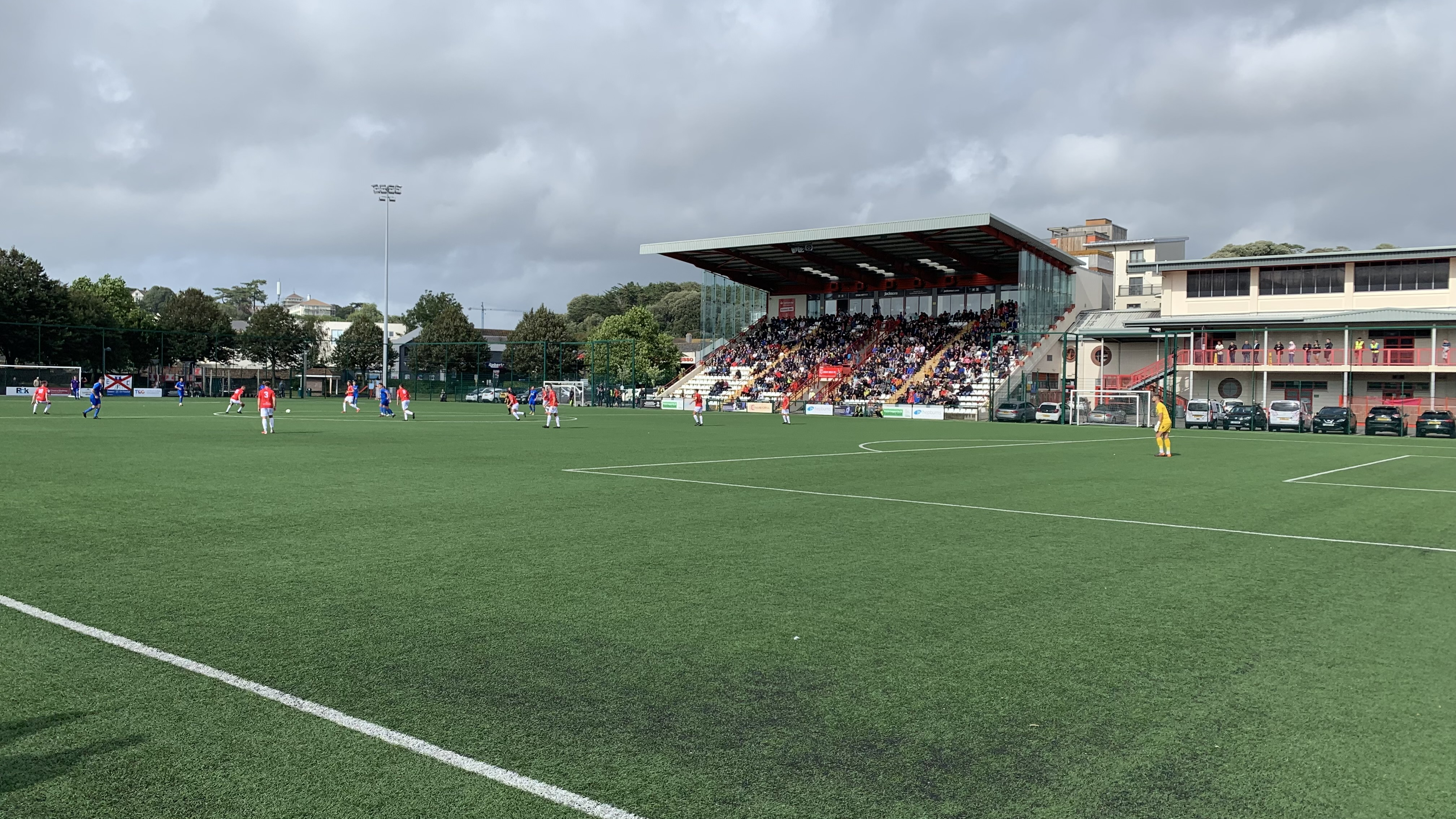
Jersey Bulls at Springfield Stadium

== Stadium ==
The club play at Springfield Stadium in St. Helier. Although situated in St. Helier, the stadium is about one mile from the town centre.

First used by the Royal Jersey Agricultural and Horticultural Society (RJA&HS) as a showground in 1885 for agricultural shows and was first used for the Muratti Vase in 1905 and has been held regularly since the 1930s, with a few exceptions. The RJA&HS proposed a sale in 1993 for housing development but it was bought by the Sport, Leisure and Recreation Committee of the States Assembly who stepped in to preserve it for sports and purchased the site in December 1994.

The capacity of the stadium holds up to 7,000 spectators and the grandstand, built in 1997, has seating for 992.

The stadium and the multi-purpose sports facility attached to it is owned by the Government of Jersey, and is also home to the Jersey Football Association and the Jersey official football team. A children's play area and an all-weather ball court was also built within the park.

== Club officials ==
=== Boardroom staff ===
Position	Name
Chairman	(England) Adam Budworth
Secretary	(England) Gary Powell
CEO	(England) Ian Horswell

=== First-team coaching staff ===
Position	Name
Manager	(England) Elliot Powell
Assistant Manager	(England) Dan Garton
First Team Coach	(England) Dan Garton
First Team Coach	Adam Lester
Fitness Coach	(England) Jan Bentley
Goalkeeping Coach	(England) Richard Hebert
Physio	(England) Steve Martin
Analyst	(England) Dyland Buesnel

== Management history ==
Stats as of 19 April 2025, league games only

Name	From	To	Duration	Games	Won	Drawn	Lost	Win %	Honors	Notes
(England) Gary Freeman	1 June 2019	6 May 2024	4 years, 340 days	145	102	26	17	70.34		
(England) Elliot Powell	28 May 2024	Present	2 years, 132 days	38	30	6	2	78.95		

== Records ==
=== Cup runs ===
- Best FA Cup performance: 3rd Qualifying round (2021–22)
- Best FA Trophy performance: 2nd Qualifying round (2025–26)
- Best FA Vase performance: 5th Round proper (2022–23, 2023–24)

=== Goals ===
- Record league win: 8–0 Sheerwater, 12 February 2022
- Record win: 10–1 Horsham YMCA, 7 August 2021
- Worst league defeat: 1–3 Balham FC, 30 March 2022
- Most goals in a game: 11 Goals: 10–1 Horsham YMCA 7 August 2021

=== Attendance ===
- Highest attendance: 1,862 – Sandhurst Town 19 April 2025
- Lowest attendance: 499 – Alton, 17 August 2024
- Seasons average highest attendance: 839 2024-25

=== Player ===
- Highest individual scorer in a competitive match: 3 goals; Karl Hinds against FC Deportivo Galicia 14 August 2019, Sol Solomon against Chessington & Hook United 1 February 2020, Lorne Bickley against Horsham YMCA F.C. 7 August 2021, Sol Solomon against Horsham YMCA F.C. 7 August 2021, Sol Solomon against Crowborough Athletic F.C. 26 September 2021, Sol Solomon against AFC Croydon Athletic 15 January 2022, Sol Solomon against Frimley Green F.C. 29 January 2022, Lorne Bickley against Sheerwater F.C. 12 February 2022, Miguel Carvalho against Frimley Green F.C. 29 October 2022, Jonny Le Quesne against Athletic Newham F.C. 3 December 2022, Sammy Henia-Kamau against Romford F.C. 14 January 2023, Francis Lekimamati against Balham F.C. 15 March 2023, Lorne Bickley against Redhill F.C. 22 April 2023, Lorne Bickley against Guilford City F.C. 21 October 2023, Lorne Bickley against Colliers Wood United F.C. 3 February 2024, Rai Dos Santos against Hassocks F.C. 7 March 2026, Rai Dos Santos against Crowborough Athletic F.C. 28 March 2026, Sammy Henia-Kamau against Sheerwater F.C. 22 August 2026

Most Competitive Hat-tricks
Number of Hat-tricks	Player name	Opposition(s)
5	Sol Solomon	Chessington & Hook United; Horsham YMCA F.C.; Crowborough Athletic F.C.; AFC Croydon Athletic; Frimley Green F.C.
5	Lorne Bickley	Horsham YMCA F.C.; Sheerwater F.C.; Redhill F.C.; Guilford City F.C.; Colliers Wood United F.C.
2	Sammy Henia-Kamau	Romford F.C.; Sheerwater F.C.
2	Rai Dos Santos	Hassocks F.C.; Crowborough Athletic F.C.
1	Karl Hinds	FC Deportivo Galicia
1	Miguel Carvalho	Frimley Green F.C.
1	Jonny Le Quesne	Athletic Newham F.C.
1	Francis Lekimamati	Balham F.C.

- Most league goals in a season: 19, Karl Hinds (as of 28 February 2020)
- All-Time Leading Goalscorers:

Rank	Player name	Goals	Position
1	Sol Solomon	60	FWD
2	Lorne Bickley	33	FWD
3	Fraser Barlow	32	FWD
4	Luke Campbell	25	DEF
5	Karl Hinds	19	FWD
6	Kieran Lester	15	MID
	Jonny Le Quesne	15	DEF
8	Daryl Wilson	13	FWD
9	Harry Cardwell	12	FWD
10	Jake Prince	11	FWD

== See also ==
- Jersey official football team
