= Jersey Wanderers F.C. =

Association football club in Jersey

Coordinates: 49.204469°N 2.182655°W

Jersey Wanderers
- Full name: Jersey Wanderers Football Club
- Founded: 1895
- Ground: Jersey Wanderers Park, St. Peter
- League: Jersey Football Combination Premiership
- 2025-26: 1st of 8
- Website: http://www.jerseywanderers.com/

Jersey Wanderers F.C. is a football club based on the Channel Island of Jersey. They are affiliated to the Jersey Football Association and play in the Jersey Football Combination Premiership.

== History ==
The club was founded in the 1894–85 season and in 1898, they were one of six teams who came together to form the Jersey Football League. In addition to being one of the most successful clubs in the top tier of Jersey Football, the club has also been and been winners of the Upton Park Trophy (Channel Islands Champions) on 11 occasions.

At the end of the 2005–06 season the club was relegated from the top division for the first time.

In 2013, the club came close to closure before being saved.

The 2019–20 season saw the club win their first top-tier title in 30 years, winning a season curtailed by the Coronavirus pandemic on an average-points-per-game basis. It was their 21st top-tier title.

== Honours ==
Information sourced from RSSSF.

- Jersey Football League/ Jersey Football Combination – Champions (22): 1905–06, 1912–13, 1920–21, 1921–22, 1927–28, 1929–30, 1930–31, 1931–32, 1934–35, 1947–48, 1951–52, 1961–62, 1962–63, 1967–68, 1970–71, 1980–81, 1984–85, 1985–86, 1988–89, 1989–90, 2019–20, 2025–26
- Le Riche Cup – Winners (8): 1980, 1986, 1988, 1989, 1995, 2017, 2018, 2026
- Upton Park Trophy – Winners (12): 1908, 1909, 1912, 1913, 1921 (shared), 1931, 1932, 1948, 1968, 1986, 1989, 2026
- W.E. Guiton Memorial Trophy - Winners (9): 1937–38, 1938–39, 1948–49, 1951–52, 1954–55, 1966–67, 1968-69 (shared), 1984–85, 2010–11
- St. Paul's Trophy – Winners: 1976–77, 2009–10
- Charity Cup – Winners (20): 1908–09, 1909–10, 1919–20, 1924–25, 1926–27, 1928–29, 1929–30, 1930–31, 1934–35, 1936–37, 1948–49, 1962–63, 1973–74, 1975–76, 1990–91, 1991–92, 2016–17, 2019–20, 2024–25, 2025–26
