= Jersey Scottish F.C. =

Association football club in Jersey

Coordinates: 49.195349°N 2.204456°W

Jersey Scottish
- Full name: Jersey Scottish Football Club
- Founded: 1960; 66 years ago
- Ground: Les Quennevais Sports Centre, St. Brelade
- League: Jersey Football Combination Premiership
- 2016–17: 3rd of 8

Jersey Scottish Football Club is a football club based on the Channel Island of Jersey. They are affiliated to the Jersey Football Association. They formerly played in the Jersey Football Combination Premiership.

== History ==
The club is the fourth most successful club in Jersey, with their last title in the 2012-13 season.

The Scots had to pull out of the league as they were unable to find a manager to replace their retiring manager Pat Brennan, and due to declining club membership for the senior team team. The youth teams continue to play.

== Honours ==
Information sources from RSSSF.

- Jersey Football League/ Jersey Football Combination – Champions (11): 1991–92, 1992–93, 1995–96, 1996–97, 1997–98, 1998–99, 2003–04, 2004–05, 2006–07, 2011–12, 2012–13
- Le Riche Cup – Winners (7): 1998, 2002, 2004, 2006, 2008, 2009, 2013
- Upton Park Trophy – Winners (5): 1993, 1999, 2005, 2007, 2013
