= Le Riche Cup =

Association football competition in Jersey

- Founded: 1921
- Region: Jersey
- Current champions: Jersey Wanderers (2025–65)
- Most championships: St. Paul's (14 wins)

Le Riche Cup (also known as The Jersey FA Cup/ JFA Cup) is the foremost football cup competition for teams playing on the island of Jersey. It is overseen by the Jersey Football Association.

== History ==
The trophy was first presented in 1921 and is engraved - Le Riche Trophy / Presented by / Le Riche's Stores Ltd. / 1921 / C.P.F.A.

The Country Parishes Football Association; covered 11 Jersey parishes excluding St. Helier. Between 1921 and 1929, teams repreesentaive teams for Jersey's CPFA and Guernsey's Sarnia League competed for the trophy. The trophy is not engraved for 1930 and 1931, and from 1932, it was re-assigned as a club competition. The Saturday Football League was formed in 1933 and it became their Knock-Out competition trophy from that season.

With the formation of the Jersey Football Combination in 1975 it became their Division 1 knock-out trophy. After 1980 it was opened up to all first teams, regardless of divisional status.

In 2011, Vale Recreation became the first club from Guernsey to enter the competition, winning their first round game against Jersey Portuguese.

== Winners ==
=== 1930s ===
- 1931: – Not engraved
- 1932: – Gas Works Athletic
- 1933: – St. Ouen
- 1934: – Ryan's
- 1935: – Ryan's
- 1936: – Troys
- 1937: – St. Martin
- 1938: – Ryan's
- 1939: – Ryan's

=== 1940s ===
- 1940: – Oaks
- 1941: – Not engraved
- 1942: – St. Peter
- 1943: – St. Peter
- 1944: – St. Martin
- 1945: – Not engraved
- 1946: – St. Martin
- 1947: – Sylvans
- 1948: – Springfield
- 1949: – Sylvans

=== 1950s ===
- 1950: – Sylvans
- 1951: – St. Brelade
- 1952: – Sylvans
- 1953: – Grouville
- 1954: – Sylvans
- 1955: – Sylvans
- 1956: – St. Clement
- 1957: – St. Saviour
- 1958: – St. Saviour
- 1959: – Grouville

=== 1960s ===
- 1960: – Grouville
- 1961: – Grouville
- 1962: – Grouville
- 1963: – Grouville
- 1964: – Sylvans
- 1965: – St. Ouen
- 1966: – St. Brelade
- 1967: – St. Ouen
- 1968: – St. Ouen
- 1969: – Springfield

=== 1970s ===
- 1970: – Springfield
- 1971: – Grouville
- 1972: – St. Peter
- 1973: – St. Peter
- 1974: – Rozel Rovers
- 1975 – St. Peter
- 1976 – Trinity
- 1977 – First Tower United
- 1978 – St. Paul's
- 1979 – Oaklands

=== 1980s ===
- 1980 – Jersey Wanderers
- 1981: – St. Paul's
- 1982: – First Tower United
- 1983: – St. Paul's
- 1984: – First Tower United
- 1985: – St. Paul's
- 1986: – Jersey Wanderers
- 1987: – St. Paul's
- 1988: – Jersey Wanderers
- 1989: – Jersey Wanderers

=== 1990s ===
- 1990: – St. Peter
- 1991: – St. Peter
- 1992: – St. Peter
- 1993: – St. Paul's
- 1994: – St. Paul's
- 1995: – Jersey Wanderers
- 1996: – Rozel Rovers
- 1997: – Rozel Rovers
- 1998: – Jersey Scottish
- 1999: – First Tower United

=== 2000s ===
- 2000: – Rozel Rovers
- 2001: – St. Peter
- 2002: – Jersey Scottish
- 2003: – Trinity
- 2004: – Jersey Scottish
- 2005: – Grouville
- 2006: – Jersey Scottish
- 2007: – St. Peter
- 2008: – Jersey Scottish ^{AET}
- 2009: – Jersey Scottish ^{AET}

=== 2010s ===
- 2010: – St. Paul's
- 2011: – St. Paul's
- 2012: – St. Paul's
- 2013: – Jersey Scottish
- 2014: – St. Paul's
- 2015: – St. Paul's
- 2016: – St. Paul's
- 2017: – Jersey Wanderers
- 2018: – Jersey Wanderers
- 2019: – St. Peter

=== 2020s ===
- 2020: – St. Paul's vs. Rozel Rovers not played - Coronavirus Pandemic restrictions
- 2021: – St. Paul's ^{replayed match}
- 2022: – Grouville
- 2023: – St. Peter
- 2024: – St. Brelade
- 2025: – Grouville
- 2026: – Jersey Wanderers

Notes

^{AET} – After Extra Time
^{replayed match} – this game was replayed following a problem with player ineligibility in the first final

== Wins by club ==
Since 1932 when the trophy became a club competition:

Club	Number of wins	Years
St. Paul's	14	1978, 1981, 1983, 1985, 1978, 1993. 1994, 2010, 2011, 2012, 2014, 2015, 2016, 2021
St. Peter	12	1942, 1943, 1972, 1973, 1975, 1990, 1991, 1992. 2001, 2007, 2019, 2023
Grouville	10	1953, 1959, 1960, 1961, 1962, 1963, 1971, 2005, 2022, 2025
Jersey Wanderers	8	1980, 1986, 1988, 1989, 1995, 2017, 2018, 2026
Jersey Scottish	7	1998, 2002, 2004, 2006, 2008, 2009, 2013
Sylvans	7	1947, 1949, 1950, 1952, 1954, 1955, 1964
First Tower United	4	1977, 1982, 1984, 1999
Rozel Rovers	4	1974, 1996, 1997, 2000
Ryan's	4	1934, 1935, 1938, 1939
St. Ouen	4	1933, 1965, 1967, 1968
Springfield	3	1948, 1969, 1970
St. Brelade	3	1951, 1966, 2024
St. Martin	3	1937, 1944, 1946
St. Saviour	2	1957, 1958
Trinity	2	1976, 2003
Gas Works Athletic	1	1932
Oaklands	1	1979
Oaks	1	1940
St. Clement	1	1956
Troys	1	1936
