= Rozel Rovers F.C. =

Association football club in Jersey

Coordinates: 49.218354°N 2.125084°W

Rozel Rovers
- Full name: Rozel Rovers Football Club
- Founded: 1943; 83 years ago
- Ground: Le Couvent, Saint Lawrence
- League: Jersey Football Combination Premiership 2
- 2025–26: 1st of 7
- Website: http://rozelroversfc.co.uk/

Rozel Rovers F.C. is a football club based on the Channel Island of Jersey. They are affiliated to the Jersey Football Association and play in the Jersey Football Combination Premiership 2.

== Honours ==
- Le Riche Cup – Winners (4): 1974, 1996, 1997, 2000
