= St. Ouen F.C. =

Association football club in Jersey

Coordinates: 49.228528°N 2.202449°W

- Full name: St. Ouen Football & Sports Club
- Founded: 1919
- Ground: La Cache es Fresnes, St. Ouen
- League: Jersey Football Combination Premiership
- 2025–26: Jersey Football Combination Premiership, 7th of 8
- Website: http://www.clubwebsite.co.uk/stouen/Home

St. Ouen F.C. is an amateur association football club in Saint Ouen, Jersey, Channel Islands who play in the Jersey Premiership. The club plays in yellow and blue. They play the majority of their games at their home ground in St. Ouen.

== History ==
The club was founded in 1919. They won their first honour in Jersey football in 1939, winning the Trinity Shield. Under the supervision of Richard Collinson, who arrived in Jersey in 1977 to coach the Old Victorians and moved next to First Tower United before arriving at St. Ouen, the club set up Jersey's first football school of excellence.

On 4 December 1972, St. Ouen played a friendly match against Scottish Old Firm team, Celtic at Springfield Stadium, Saint Helier. The game was intended as a preparation for Celtic's Scottish League Cup Final match against Hibernian. This meant that Celtic played their first team, which included Kenny Dalglish and Pat McCluskey, in the match. Celtic won the match 11–1. St. Ouen's team on that day also included several professional guest players, including Southampton's Jim Steele and Mick Channon.

In 2006, St. Ouen were promoted into Division One after becoming champions of Division Two. However they were relegated back into Division Two the following season before again being promoted back into Division One the next season.

In 2008, St. Ouen received planning permission from the States of Jersey for a new training pitch to be built, which overturned the decision from the planning officer of Jersey because of the perceived benefits of inclusiveness with the community. In 2012, St. Ouen's goalkeeper, Paul Kemp scored two goals in St. Ouen's league game against Rozel Rovers. This was the first time a goalkeeper had scored twice in a match in Jersey. Also in 2012, they won the Trinity Shield for the first time since 1939.

== Teams ==
St. Ouen have three men's teams playing in the Jersey Football Combination. St. Ouen also run teams ranging from under 12s up to under 18 levels. They have also represented Jersey in the Channel Islands Champions League against teams from Guernsey. St. Ouen also ran a cricket club for its members during the off-season however the cricket club split from the football club in 1968 to become an independent club but retained the St. Ouen name.

== Honours ==
- Jersey Football Combination Division 2
  - Champions: – 2005–06, 2007–08
- Jersey Saturday Football League
  - Champions: – 1962–63, 1963–64, 1954–65, 1966–67, 1967–68, 1969-70, 1971–72, 1972–73 (shared)
- Wheway Cup
  - Winners: – 2016
  - Runners Up: – 2014
- Jeremie Cup
  - Winners: – 2016
- PW Touzel Memorial Trophy
  - Winners: – 2006
- WJ Collins Cup
  - Winners: – 2008
- Le Riche Cup
  - Winners: – 1933, 1965, 1967, 1968
  - Runners Up: – 2011
- Willis Cup
  - Winners: – 2007
  - Runners Up: – 2016
- Trinity Shield
  - Winners: – 1939, 2012
