= St. Clement S.C. =

Association football club in Jersey

Coordinates: 49.172719°N 2.046763°W

St. Clement
- Full name: St. Clement Sports Club
- Founded: 1960
- Ground: La Coeffardiere, Saint Clement
- League: Jersey Football Combination Premiership
- 2025–26: 2nd of 8
- Website: www.stclementsc.co.uk

St. Clement S.C. is a football club based on the Channel Island of Jersey. They are affiliated to the Jersey Football Association and play in the Jersey Football Combination Premiership.

== Honours ==
- Le Riche Cup – Winners (1): 1956
- Community Shield – Winners: 2025
