= St. Paul's F.C. =

Association football club in Jersey

St. Paul's
- Full name: St. Paul's Football Club
- Founded: 1919; 107 years ago
- Ground: Clos des Pauvres, Saint Saviour
- Manager: Robbie Whittaker
- League: Jersey Football Combination Premiership
- 2025–26: 3rd of 8

St. Paul's F.C. is a football club based on the Channel Island of Jersey. They are affiliated to the Jersey Football Association and play in the Jersey Football Combination Premiership.

The club has won the top tier of league football in Jersey 21 times, a joint record, and has won the top Channel Islands competition, The Upton 15 times, second only to Northerners.

== History ==
The club was formed on 10 May 1919 at a meeting of the Old St Paul's Association at St Paul's School. On 5 June 2019 they made the decision to play in yellow and black, the colours on the Old St Paul's Association. The first competitive match was against YMCA and the club lost 7–1 and was played at West Mount.

The club has a rich history of producing some of Jersey's most notable players, with the likes of Graeme Le Saux and Brett Pitman coming through the ranks to become established professional footballers. In the 2009–10 season, they became the first club to win all six competitions in one season, by winning the league, four cups and the Upton (an inter-island cup final between the league champions of Jersey and Guernsey).

In 2015, the club created history by winning the Upton 9–0 against Guernsey Northerners, the biggest win in the history of the competition.

In 2018, two club players represented the England national football C team, Euan Van De Vliet and Harry Curtis.

== Honours ==
Information sourced from RSSSF.

- Jersey Football League / Jersey Football Combination – Champions (21): 1922–23, 1935–36, 1948–49, 1949–50, 1950–51, 1979–80, 1981–82, 1986–87, 1987–88, 1999–2000, 2007–08, 2008–09, 2009–10, 2010–11, 2013–14, 2014–15, 2015–16, 2016–17, 2017–18, 2018–19, 2020–21
- Le Riche Cup – Winners (14): 1978, 1981, 1983, 1985, 1978, 1993. 1994, 2010, 2011, 2012, 2014, 2015 2016, 2021
- Upton Park Trophy – Winners (15): 1923, 1949, 1951, 1980, 1982, 1987, 2000, 2009, 2010, 2014, 2015, 2016, 2017, 2018, 2019
- W.E. Guiton Memorial Trophy – Winners (19): 1960–61, 1963–64, 1967–68, 1968–69 (shared), 1971–72, 1973–74, 1975–76, 1976–77, 1978–79, 1979–80, 1980–81, 1983–84, 1986–87, 1988–89, 2000–01, 2001–02, 2007–08, 2008–09, 2014–15
