= St. Peter F.C. =

Association football club in Jersey

Coordinates: 49.208121°N 2.179919°W

St. Peter
- Full name: St. Peter Football & Sports Club
- Short name
- Founded: 1919
- Ground: La Rue des Vignes, St. Peter
- Capacity: 1,000
- League: Jersey Football Combination Premiership 1
- 2025–26: Jersey Football Combination Premiership, 6th of 8
- Website: http://stpeterfc.com/

St. Peter F.C. is a football club based on the Channel Island of Jersey. They are affiliated to the Jersey Football Association and play in the Jersey Football Combination Premiership 2. The club hosted matches during the 2015 Island Games, including the 3rd/4th place play off match.

== Honours ==
- Jersey Football Combination
  - Champions – (4): 2000–01, 2001–02, 2005–06, 2022–23
- Le Riche Cup
  - Winners – (12): 1942, 1943, 1972, 1973, 1975, 1990, 1991, 1992. 2001, 2007, 2019, 2023
