= Jersey Football Combination =

Association football league in Jersey

- Founded: 1975; 51 years ago
- Country: (Jersey)
- Number of clubs: 28 (in 2025–26)
- Level on pyramid: 1–4
- Relegation to: Jersey Championship
- Domestic cup: Le Riche Cup
- League cup(s): Wheway Trophy; Charity Cup
- Current champions: Grouville (2024-25)
- Most championships: St. Paul's (16 titles)
- Broadcaster: ITV
- Website: fulltime.thefa.com/index.html?league=8379530

The Jersey Football Combination is the senior football league on the island of Jersey and is run by the Jersey Football Association.

Although the league is affiliated with the English FA, it does not form a part of the English football league system.

Each year, the league champion plays the champions of Guernsey's Priaulx League for the Upton Park Trophy.

== History ==
The Jersey Football Combination League (JCFL) was established in 1975 after a merger between the Jersey Football League and the Jersey Saturday Football League. The JFCL were initially independent from the Jersey Football Association.

Originally, the Jersey Football Combination consisted of five divisions, with the Premiership and Championship open to first teams, with separate leagues for reserve sides. However, from the start of the 2015-16 season all first-team sides play in the Premiership, with a mid-season split into two divisions. After one season, this was scrapped and the format changed again. From the 2016-17 season onwards the top 8 teams play in the Premiership and the other 7 teams play in the Championship.

The Jersey Football Combination also selects a side to play in the FA Inter-League Cup. In 2012, the Jersey team qualified for the 2013 UEFA Regions' Cup, where they were eliminated in the group stage.

In 2019, after nearly 20 years of discussions, it was finally agreed that the JFA and Jersey Football Combination would merge, with the JFA assuming responsibility for the administrative and organization of league football on the island. The 2019–20 season was the first to be organized of the FFA.

== Clubs ==
The following clubs are in the league for the 2026-27 season.

=== Premiership ===
- Grouville
- Jersey Wanderers
- Rosele Rovers
- St. Brelade
- St. Clement
- St. Ouen
- St. Paul's
- St. Peter

=== Premiership 2 ===
- Dragoes de Jersey
- St. John
- St. Lawrence
- Sporting Academics
- Sports Club of Jersey
- Trinity

=== Championship 1 ===
- Grouville (reserves)
- Jersey Wanderers (reserves)
- Madiera FC
- Sports Club of Jersey
- St. Clement (reserves)
- Saint Lawrence
- St. Ouen (reserves)
- St. Paul (reserves)
- Trinity

=== Championship 2 ===
- First Tower United
- Grouville (C's)
- Jersey Wanderers (C's)
- Rozel Rovers (reserves)
- St. Brelade F.C. (reserves)
- St. John
- St Lawrence (reserves)
- St. Ouen (C's)
- St. Peter (reserves)
- Trinity (reserves)

== Premiership ==
=== Champions ===
No.	Season	Champion	Notes
1	1975-76	First Tower United	1st Title
2	1976-77	First Tower United	2nd Title
3	1977-78	First Tower United	3rd Title
4	1978-79	Oaklands	1st Title
5	1979-80	St. Paul's	1st Title
6	1980-81	Jersey Wanderers	1st Title
7	1981-82	St. Paul's	2nd Title
8	1982-83	First Tower United	4th Title
9	1983-84	First Tower United	5th Title
10	1984-85	Jersey Wanderers	2nd Title
11	1985-86	Jersey Wanderers	3rd Title
12	1986-87	St. Paul's	3rd Title
13	1987-88	St. Paul's	4th Title
14	1988-89	Jersey Wanderers	4th Title
15	1989-90	Jersey Wanderers	5th Title
16	1990-91	Sporting Academics	1st Title
17	1991-92	Jersey Scottish	1st Title
18	1992-93	Jersey Scottish	2nd Title
19	1993-94	First Tower United	6th Title
20	1994-95	First Tower United	7th Title
21	1995-96	Jersey Scottish	3rd Title
22	1996-97	Jersey Scottish	4th Title
23	1997-98	Jersey Scottish	5th Title
24	1998-99	Jersey Scottish	6th Title
25	1999-00	St Paul's	5th Title
26	2000-01	St. Peter	1st Title
27	2001-02	St Peter	2nd Title
28	2002-03	Trinity	1st Title
29	2003-04	Jersey Scottish	7th Title
30	2004-05	Jersey Scottish	8th Title
31	2005-06	St Peter	3rd Title
32	2006-07	Jersey Scottish	9th Title
33	2007-08	St Paul's	6th Title
34	2008-09	St Paul's	7th Title
35	2009-10	St Paul's	8th Title
36	2010-11	St Paul's	9th Title
37	2011-12	Jersey Scottish	10th Title
38	2012-13	Jersey Scottish	11th Title
39	2013-14	St. Paul's	10th Title
40	2014-15	St. Paul's	11th Title
41	2015-16	St. Paul's	12th Title
42	2016-17	St. Paul's	13th Title
43	2017-18	St. Paul's	14th Title
44	2018-19	St. Paul's	15th Title
45	2019-20	Jersey Wanderers	6th Title
46	2020-21	St. Paul's	16th Title
47	2021-22	St. Clement	1st Title
48	2022-23	St. Peter	4th Title
49	2023-24	St. Clement	2nd Title
50	2024-25	Grouville	1st Title
51	2025-26		

=== All-Time Premiership Table ===
All-Time Jersey Premiership table from the start of the 2011-12 season up to the end of 2017-18 season.

Pos.	Club	Seasons	Pld	Win	Draw	Loss	GF	GA	GD	Pts	1st	2nd	3rd	Relegated	Pts per Match	Best Pos.
1	**St. Paul's**	**7**	**119**	**89**	18	12	**404**	122	282	**282**	**5**	2			**2.37**	**1**
2	Jersey Scottish	6	101	74	13	14	389	103	**286**	235	2	**3**	1		2.33	**1**
3	**Jersey Wanderers**	**7**	**119**	68	13	38	275	155	92	217		1	**6**		1.82	2
4	**St. Ouen**	**7**	**119**	46	21	**52**	214	219	-5	158					1.33	4
5	**St. Peter**	**7**	**119**	41	**32**	46	221	**223**	-2	155		1			1.30	2
6	**Trinity**	5	85	32	13	40	158	188	-30	109				1	1.28	4
7	**Rozel Rovers**	5	89	20	20	49	117	196	-79	80				2	0.90	6
8	**St. Clement**	4	66	18	8	40	89	178	-89	62				1	0.94	4
9	Grouville	4	66	12	12	42	67	211	-144	51				2	0.77	4
10	St. Brelade	3	50	12	9	29	62	108	-46	42				1	0.84	5
11	St. Lawrence	2	34	6	5	23	33	107	-74	23				2	0.68	9
12	Jersey Portuguese	1	21	2	3	16	18	88	-70	9				1	0.43	8
13	St. John	1	14	2	2	10	12	44	-32	8				1	0.57	7
14	First Tower United	1	16	1	3	12	17	50	-33	6				1	0.38	9

Numbers in bold are the record (highest either positive or negative) numbers in each column.

League or status at 2018-19:

2018-19 Jersey Premiership
2018-19 Jersey Championship
Defunct or not competing in 2018-19

=== All-time top scorers ===
Records began from the start of the 2011-12 season

As of 6 April 2019.

Rank	Name	Years	Goals	Seasons Played
1	(Jersey) **Kieran Lester**	2011, 2014–	107	6
2	(Jersey) **Craig Russell**	2011–	98	8
3	(Jersey) **Daryl Wilson**	2011, 2013–	79	7
4	(Jersey) **Karl Hinds**	2013–	78	6
5	(Jersey) **Jack Boyle**	2011, 2013–	63	7
6	(Jersey) **Matt Rawlings**	2011, 2014–2016, 2017–	59	5
7	(Jersey) Jack Cannon	2011–2018	52	7
8	(Jersey) **Charlie Petulla**	2011–	46	8
9	(Jersey) **Stewart Daynes**	2011–2017, 2018–	43	7
10	(Jersey) Rupert Murray	2011–2017	42	6

Bold denotes players currently playing in the Jersey Premiership.

== Records ==
Since the start of the 2011-12 season

As of the end of 2017-18 season.

=== Titles ===
- Most titles: 5, St. Paul's
- Most consecutive title wins: 5, St. Paul's (2013-14 to 2017-18)
- Biggest title-winning margin: 14 points, twice; 2011–12 Jersey Scottish (41 points) over St. Paul's (27 points) and 2016-17 St Paul's (54 points) over Jersey Wanderers (40 points)
- Smallest title-winning margin: 0 points and 7 goal difference – 2015-16; St. Paul's (+33) over Jersey Scottish (+26).

=== Goals ===
- Most goals scored in a season: 88, St. Paul's (2016–17)
- Fewest goals scored in a season: 9, Grouville (2017–18)
- Most goals conceded in a season: 92, Grouville (2017–18)
- Fewest goals conceded in a season: 10, St. Paul's (2014–15)
- Best goal difference in a season: 71, St. Paul's (2016–17)
- Most goals scored at home in a season: 37, St. Paul's (2016–17)
- Fewest goals scored at home in a season: 5
  - Rozel Rovers (2012–13)
  - Grouville (2013–14)
  - St. Clement (2015–16)
- Most goals conceded at home in a season: 40, Grouville (2017–18)
- Fewest goals conceded at home in a season: 3, St. Paul's (2014–15)
- Most goals scored away in a season: 51, St. Paul's (2016–17)
- Fewest goals scored away in a season: 3, Grouville (2017–18)
- Most goals conceded away in a season: 54, Jersey Portuguese (2016–17)
- Fewest goals conceded away in a season: 5, Jersey Scottish (2014–15)

=== Points ===
- Most points in a season: 54, St. Paul's (2016–17)
- Fewest points in a season: 1, Grouville (2017–18)
- Most points in a season without winning the league: 44, Jersey Scottish (2014–15)
- Fewest points in a season while winning the league: 34, St. Paul's (2015–16)
- Most points in a season while being relegated: 20, Trinity (2015–16)
- Fewest points in a season while surviving relegation: 14, St. Ouen (2013–14)

== Le Riche Cup ==
The Le Riche Cup is the main cup competition in Jersey. Every final has been played at Springfield Stadium, St Helier.

== Wheway Trophy ==
The Wheway Trophy is the second most important cup competition in Jersey, which also includes the top 3 clubs from Guernsey. Every final has been played at Springfield Stadium, St Helier.

=== Finals ===
Wheway Trophy winners
Season	Winners	Score	Runners–up
2011-12	St. Paul's	2 - 0	Grouville
2012-13	Jersey Scottish	3 - 0	Northerners (Guernsey)
2013-14	Jersey Scottish	6 - 1	St. Ouen
2014-15	St. Paul's	1 - 0	Jersey Wanderers
2015-16	St. Ouen	4 - 2	Sylvans (Guernsey)
2016-17	St. Paul's	3 - 0	St. Ouen
2017-18	St. Paul's	3 - 2	St. Peter
2018-19	St. Paul's	3 - 1	St. Peter

Key to list of winners:
*	Match went to extra time
†	Match decided by a penalty shootout after extra time

== Championship ==
=== Promotions to Premiership ===
A record of every club to have been promoted to the Jersey Premiership

Season	Champion	Other Promotions
2011-12	St. Brelade	St. Lawrence
2012-13	Trinity	St. Clement
2013-14	First Tower United	St. Lawrence, Rozel Rovers
2014-15	St. John	none
2015-16	Rozel Rovers	Jersey Portuguese
2016-17	St. Clement	Grouville
2017-18	Trinity	none^{a}

- a. Rozel Rovers beat St. Lawrence 3 - 0 (AET) in the Premiership Play-Off.

== List of Premiership Seasons ==
=== 2017-18 ===
Extended content

Jersey Premiership
- Season: 2017–18
- Dates: 9 September 2017 – 26 May 2018
- Champions: St. Paul's
- Relegated: Grouville
- Matches: 62
- Goals: 260 (4.19 per match)
- Top goalscorer: Matt Rawlings (21 goals)
- Biggest home win: Jersey Wanderers 11–0 Grouville (24 March 2018)
- Biggest away win: Grouville 1–11 St. Peter (19 April 2018)
- Highest scoring: Grouville 1–11 St. Peter (19 April 2018)
- Longest winning run: 5 matches St. Paul's
- Longest unbeaten run: 14 matches St. Paul's
- Longest winless run: 18 matches Grouville
- Longest losing run: 17 matches Grouville
- All statistics correct as of 26 May 2018.

The 2017–18 Jersey Premiership is the 43rd season of the Jersey Football Combination, the top Jersey professional league for Jersey clubs, since its establishment in 1975. The season started on 9 September 2017 and finished on 26 May 2018.

St. Paul's are the defending champions, while St. Clement and Grouville have entered as the promoted teams from the 2016-17 Jersey Championship.

==== League table ====
As of 26 May 2018.

Pos	Team	Pld	W	D	L	GF	GA	GD	Pts
1	(Jersey) St. Paul's (C)	18	14	2	2	59	20	+39	44
2	(Jersey) St. Peter	18	10	5	3	55	22	+33	35
3	Jersey Wanderers	18	9	2	7	56	28	+28	29
4	(Jersey) St. Clement	18	9	2	7	41	38	+3	29
5	(Jersey) St. Ouen	18	9	1	8	34	31	+3	28
6	(Jersey) Rozel Rovers	18	4	3	11	21	44	-23	15
7	(Jersey) Grouville (R)	18	0	1	17	9	92	-83	1

(C) = Champions, (R) = Relegated

==== Results ====
Each team plays each other three times meaning that each team will play 18 games in total

===== 1st set of results =====
Home \ Away	GRO	JER	ROZ	STC	STO	SPA	SPE
Grouville	—	0–2	0–0	1–5	0–1	1–9	1–11
Jersey Wanderers	8–0	—	6–1	1–1	1–2	2–1	1–3
Rozel Rovers	2–1	2–8	—	1–2	1–2	0–1	1–1
St. Clement	6–0	2–0	1–3	—	1–3	5–2	3–1
St. Ouen	4–1	3–2	5–1	1–2	—	1–4	0–2
St. Paul's	10–0	3–0	1–0	8–2	3–2	—	2–1
St. Peter	9–0	1–1	4–1	4–2	0–0	1–1	—

Updated to match(es) played on 26 May 2018. Source:
Legend: Blue = home team win; Yellow = draw; Red = away team win.

===== 2nd set of results =====
Home \ Away	GRO	JER	ROZ	STC	STO	SPA	SPE
Grouville	—		1–2	2–4			0–6
Jersey Wanderers	11–0	—	3–1		3–4		
Rozel Rovers			—	2–2		1–3	1–3
St. Clement		0–3		—	2–1		1–2
St. Ouen	2–1		0–1		—	2–3	
St. Paul's	H - W^{a}	3–0		3–0		—	
St. Peter		1–4			3–1	2–2	—

Updated to match(es) played on 26 May 2018. Source:
Legend: Blue = home team win; Yellow = draw; Red = away team win.

^{a} Home Walkover given to St. Paul's

==== Players ====
===== Top scorers =====
As of 26 May 2018.

Rank	Name	Club	Goals
1	(Jersey) Matt Rawlings	St. Clement	21
2=	(Jersey) Jake Prince	St. Peter	18
2=	(Jersey) Karl Hinds	St. Paul's	18
4	(Jersey) Jack Boyle	St. Paul's	13
5	(Jersey) Arthur Illingworth	Jersey Wanderers	11
6=	(Jersey) Dom Pougeolle	St. Ouen	9
6=	(Jersey) Jules Gabbiadini	Jersey Wanderers	9
6=	(Jersey) Harrison Moon	Jersey Wanderers	9
9=	(Jersey) Craig Russell	St. Paul's	8
9=	(Jersey) Sol Solomon	St Peter	8
11=	(Jersey) Kieran Lester	St. Paul's	7
11=	(Jersey) George Glithero	Rozel Rovers	7
13=	(Jersey) Ben Gallichan	St Peter	5
13=	(Jersey) Daryl Wilson	St Peter	5

===== Hat-tricks =====
Player	For	Against	Result	Date
(Jersey) Dom Pougeolle	St. Ouen	Rozel Rovers	5–0 (H)	4 November 2017
(Jersey) Karl Hinds^{7}	St. Paul's	Grouville	9–1 (A)	18 November 2017
(Jersey) Jake Prince	St. Peter	St. Ouen	3–1 (H)	27 January 2018
(Jersey) Matt Rawlings^{4}	St. Clement	Grouville	4–2 (A)	24 February 2018
(Jersey) Karl Hinds	St. Paul's	Grouville	10–0 (H)	7 March 2018
(Jersey) Arthur Illingworth	Jersey Wanderers	Grouville	11–0 (H)	24 March 2018
(Jersey) Ben Gallichan	St. Peter	Grouville	9–0 (H)	4 April 2018
(Jersey) Jake Prince	St. Peter	Grouville	9–0 (H)	4 April 2018
(Jersey) Jake Prince^{4}	St. Peter	Grouville	11–1 (A)	19 April 2018
(Jersey) Sol Solomon	St. Peter	Grouville	11–1 (A)	19 April 2018
(Jersey) Jake Prince	St. Peter	Grouville	6–0 (A)	24 April 2018
(Jersey) Matt Rawlings	St. Clement	Grouville	6–0 (H)	10 May 2018
(Jersey) Liam Spencer	St. Clement	Grouville	6–0 (H)	10 May 2018
(Jersey) Matt Rawlings^{4}	St. Clement	St. Paul's	5–2 (H)	17 May 2018

Note

^{4} Player scored 4 goals; ^{7} Player scored 7 goals; (H) – Home; (A) – Away

=== 2018-19 ===
Jersey Premiership
- Season: 2018–19
- Matches: 61
- Goals: 255 (4.18 per match)
- Top goalscorer: Kieran Lester (15 goals)
- Biggest home win: St. Peter 6-1 Jersey Wanderers (8 September 2018); Jersey Wanderers 6-1 Rozel Rovers (21 September 2018); St. Peter 6-1 Jersey Wanderers (14 November 2018); St. Paul's 6-1 St. Clement (8 December 2018); Trinity 7-2 St. Peter (20 April 2019)
- Biggest away win: Rozel Rovers 0-9 St. Peter (5 January 2019)
- Highest scoring: St. Paul's 7-4 Rozel Rovers (2 March 2019)
- Longest winning run: 10 matches St. Paul's
- Longest unbeaten run: 10 matches St. Paul's
- Longest winless run: 12 matches Trinity
- Longest losing run: 6 matches Rozel Rovers; Trinity
- All statistics correct as of 20 April 2019.

The 2018-19 Jersey Premiership is the 44th season of the Jersey Football Combination, the top Jersey professional league for Jersey clubs, since its establishment in 1975.

St. Paul's are the defending champions, while Trinity have entered as the promoted team from the 2017-18 Jersey Championship.

==== League table ====
As of 20 April 2019.

Pos	Team	Pld	W	D	L	GF	GA	GD	Pts
1	(Jersey) St. Paul's (C)	18	17	0	1	61	13	+48	51
2	(Jersey) St. Peter	17	13	1	3	58	24	+34	40
3	Jersey Wanderers	17	9	1	7	38	36	+2	28
4	(Jersey) St. Clement	17	5	4	8	28	36	-8	19
5	(Jersey) St. Ouen	18	5	1	12	18	44	-26	16
6	(Jersey) Rozel Rovers	17	3	3	11	25	56	-31	12
7	(Jersey) Trinity	18	3	2	13	26	45	-19	11

(C) = Champions

==== Results ====
Each team plays each other three times meaning that each team will play 18 games in total

===== 1st set of results =====
Home \ Away	JER	ROZ	STC	STO	SPA	SPE	TRI
Jersey Wanderers	—	6–1	3–2	3–1	1–3	3–4	3–2
Rozel Rovers	1–4	—	1–2	0–0	0–2	0–9	4–0
St. Clement	2–2	2–1	—	4–0	0–5	2–3	1–1
St. Ouen	2–1	4–1	2–4	—	1–3	0–2	1–3
St. Paul's	2–0	7–4	6–1	2–0	—	2–1	2–1
St. Peter	6–1	3–0		4–1	2–0	—	5–2
Trinity	1–2	0–2	2–4	0–1	0–4	0–3	—

Updated to match(es) played on 20 April 2019. Source:
Legend: Blue = home team win; Yellow = draw; Red = away team win.

===== 2nd set of results =====
Home \ Away	JER	ROZ	STC	STO	SPA	SPE	TRI
Jersey Wanderers	—			4–1			2–1
Rozel Rovers		—	2–2		1–8	3–3	
St. Clement	0–2		—	0–1		0–2	
St. Ouen	1–0	1–2		—	0–8		2–1
St. Paul's			1–0		—		3–0
St. Peter	6–1			2–0		—	
Trinity		3–2	2–2			7–2	—

Updated to match(es) played on 20 April 2019. Source:
Legend: Blue = home team win; Yellow = draw; Red = away team win.

==== Players ====
===== Top scorers =====
As of 20 April 2019.

Rank	Name	Club	Goals
1	(Jersey) Kieran Lester	St. Paul's	15
2	(Jersey) Sol Solomon	St. Peter	14
3	(Jersey) Matt Rawlings	St. Clement	12
4	(Jersey) Harry Cardwell	St. Peter	11
5=	(Jersey) Fraser Barlow	St. Paul's	10
5=	(Jersey) Karl Hinds	Trinity and St. Peter	10
7=	(Jersey) Jack Boyle	St. Paul's	9
7=	(Jersey) Jules Gabbiadini	Jersey Wanderers	9
7=	(Jersey) George Glithero	Rozel Rovers	9
10=	(Jersey) Jake Prince	St. Peter	7
10=	(Jersey) Jody Byrne	St. Ouen	7

===== Hat-tricks =====
Player	For	Against	Result	Date
(Jersey) Matt Rawlings	St. Clement	St. Ouen	4 - 0 (H)	7 September 2018
(Jersey) Dom Pougeolle	St. Ouen	Rozel Rovers	4 - 1 (H)	26 October 2018
(Jersey) Karl Hinds	Trinity	Rozel Rovers	3 - 2 (H)	3 November 2018
(Jersey) Matt Rawlings	St. Clement	St. Ouen	4 - 2 (A)	13 November 2018
(Jersey) Sol Solomon	St. Peter	Jersey Wanderers	6 - 1 (H)	14 November 2018
(Jersey) Fraser Barlow^{4}	St. Paul's	St. Clement	6 - 1 (H)	8 December 2018
(Jersey) Kieran Lester^{4}	St. Paul's	Rozel Rovers	8 - 1 (A)	11 December 2018
(Jersey) Harry Cardwell^{4}	St. Peter	Rozel Rovers	9 - 0 (A)	5 January 2019
(Jersey) Sol Solomon	St. Peter	Rozel Rovers	9 - 0 (A)	5 January 2019
(Jersey) Ethan Boudin	Rozel Rovers	St. Paul's	4 - 7 (A)	2 March 2019
(Jersey) Ricky Figueira	Trinity	St. Peter	7 - 2 (H)	20 April 2019
(Jersey) Connor Maher	Trinity	St. Peter	7 - 2 (H)	20 April 2019

Note

^{4} Player scored 4 goals;

== See also ==
- List of association football competitions
