= Springfield Stadium =

Multi-purpose stadium in St. Helier, Jersey

Coordinates: 49.191°N 2.100°W

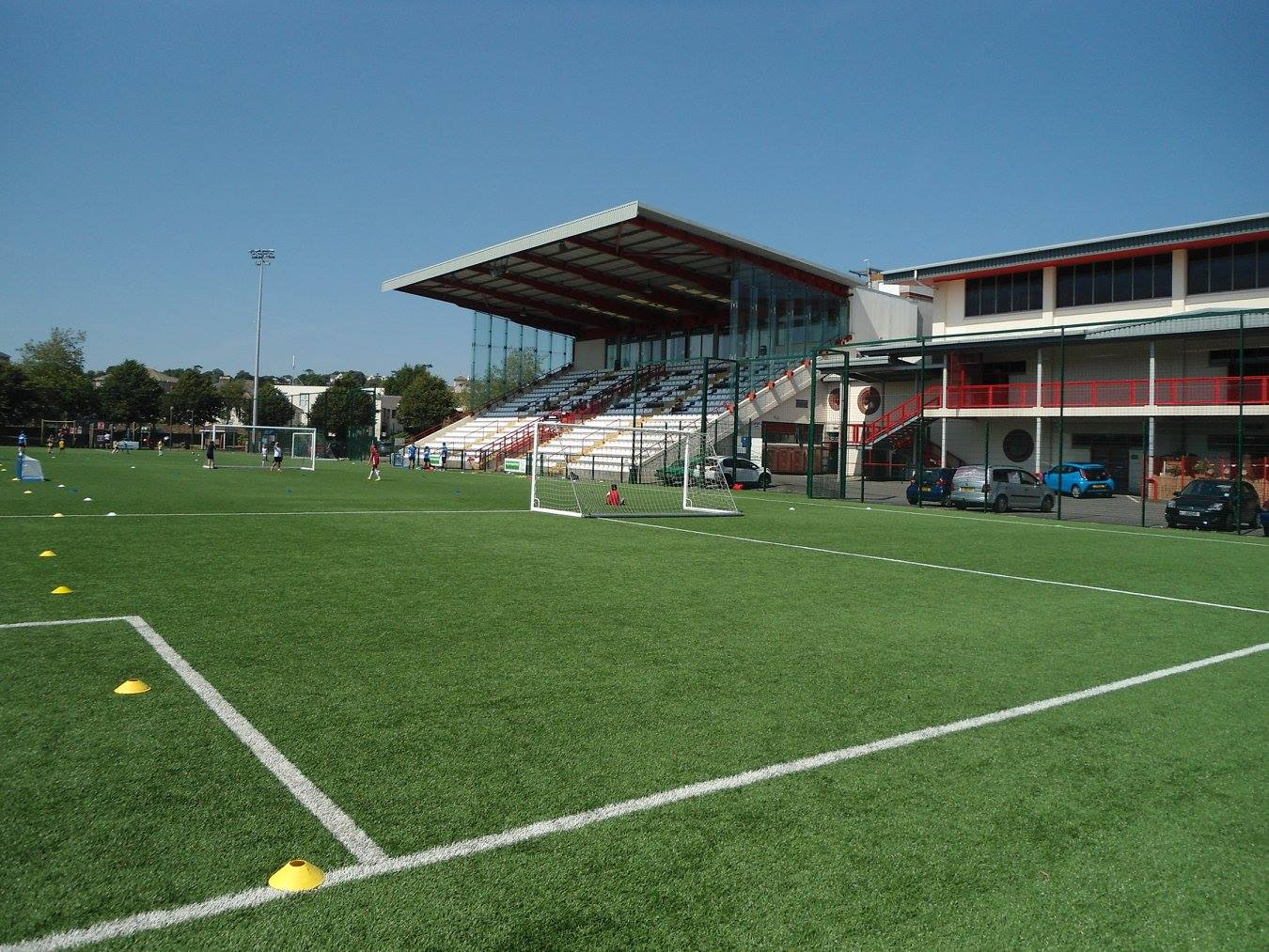
- Interactive map of Springfield Stadium
- Former names: Springfield Stadium and Sports Centre
- Location: St Helier, Jersey
- Owner: States of Jersey
- Operator: States of Jersey
- Capacity: 2,000

Construction
- Opened: 1885
- Renovated: 1997

Tenants
- Jersey Football Association; Jersey official football team Jersey Bulls (2019–)

Website
- Springfield on gov.je

Springfield Stadium is a multi-purpose stadium in St Helier, Jersey, set in a public park.

== History ==
The meadow area on which the showground was laid out gained the name of Springfield from the vernacular hydronymy. The land borders Le Grand Douet and Rouge Bouillon (modern Jèrriais spelling: Rouoge Bouoillon: red spring) and floods regularly. Significant flooding was recorded in 1881, 1977 and 1980. The Royal Jersey Agricultural and Horticultural Society was founded in 1833 and had held its Jersey cattle shows at various venues until its jubilee in 1883, when it was decided to acquire a ground of its own for the holding of exhibitions and the examination of cattle for registration. Seven sites in Saint Helier were considered and out of these Springfield was chosen on 10 September 1884. The site at that time covered five vergées and comprised gardens and two cottages. The RJA&HS purchased the property from Tom Charles Le Gros on 6 December 1884 for the sum of £1,384 11s 10d. Between the initial purchase and 1939 the RJA&HS acquired adjacent properties to expand the site. In 1904, adjacent land used by the Caesarean Archery, Croquet and Lawn Tennis Club since the 1860s was acquired from the Rector of Saint Helier – evidence of early use of the site for sporting activities.

The RJA&HS constructed the first hall on the site in 1888.

Springfield became the venue for agricultural shows, as well as hosting social and sporting events, including the Battle of Flowers. The Royal Jersey Militia used the ground as a parade ground from the early 20th century, and the hall was taken over by the military at the outbreak of the First World War.

The first Muratti final took place at Springfield on 27 April 1905, but after two years the venue for Muratti matches moved elsewhere until 1923 when Springfield became host in alternate years. Since 1930 Muratti matches have been regularly held at Springfield with few exceptions.

The first hall was demolished in 1922 and a new Springfield Hall was opened in 1924. It was an early concrete building with geometric Art Nouveau details.

The first Battle of Flowers to be held at Springfield was in 1928 with an attendance of 10,000 spectators and it continued to be held there until the Occupation 1940–45. During the German occupation it was used as a repair depot and parking area for tanks.

In 1939 the hall was taken over as a first aid post. Following the Liberation in 1945, the hall regularly hosted trade exhibitions, plays, pantomimes, shows, the Jersey Eisteddfod and other attractions.

In the 1960s the ballroom was the venue for concerts, including early performances by the Beatles and the Rolling Stones, and in 1969 the final live performance of the original line-up of the Small Faces. The performance by the Rolling Stones in Springfield Ballroom on 21 August 1964 was notable for an incident when a member of the audience, Peter Smith, threw a tomato at the band as a protest against their attitude when appearing on Juke Box Jury. Mick Jagger stopped the band playing and challenged the tomato thrower to face him.

In 1969 the RJA&HS moved their offices to a new building on the Springfield site.

On 30 November 1971 a record crowd of more than 11,100 spectators packed into Springfield to watch a match involving Manchester United.

In 1993 the RJA&HS proposed the sale of the site, now totalling 12 vergées in area, to La Pouclée Farm Developments, a company that planned to build housing on the site. The Sport, Leisure and Recreation Committee of the States of Jersey took action to preserve the facility for sport and leisure use and proposed that the property be acquired by the public.

== Modern use ==
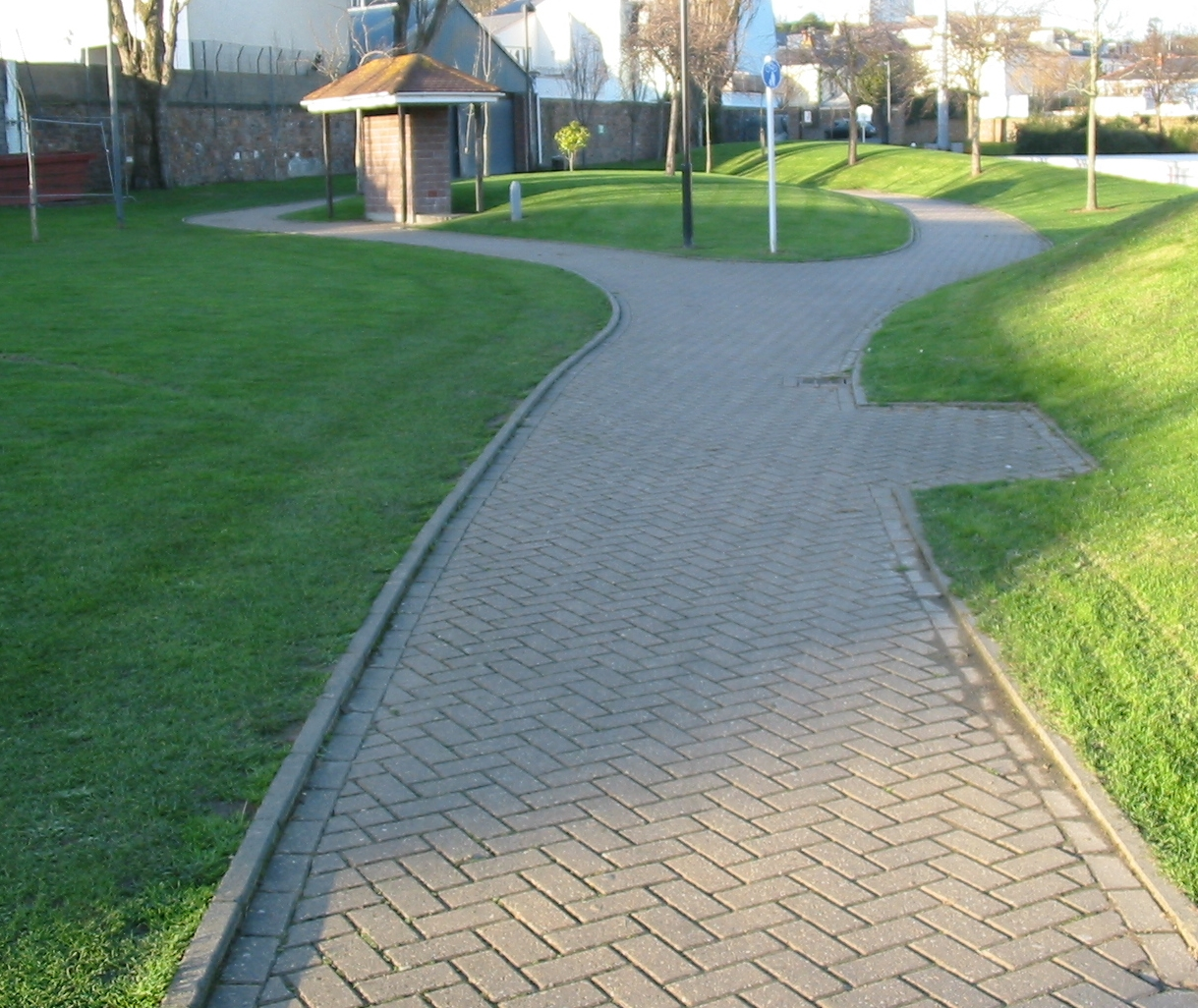
Shared use path through Springfield Park. The raised bank at right provides an informal vantage over the pitch for standing spectators as well as a slope for sunbathers.

The States of Jersey purchased the site from the RJA&HS on 9 December 1994. Part of the site was used for the construction of a new road, La Petite Rue du Val Plaisant. The layout was altered and the pitch reoriented. The hall was demolished, and the current community hall and grandstand opened in 1997.

The main pitch is currently used mostly for football matches, most notably the Muratti, and the Upton Park Trophy, and has hosted the Island Games opening ceremony. The grandstand seats 960 people and up to 1,000 people can watch from around the pitch. It is the headquarters of the Jersey Football Association. On 31 July 2005, approximately 7,000 spectators – largely drawn from the island's Portuguese community – attended an exhibition match between Portuguese Primeira Liga team Marítimo and a Jersey Select team, with the visitors winning 6–0.

In 2015 the stadium once again hosted events in the Island Games.

A children's playground and all-weather ball court are also situated in the park. A shared-use footpath/cycleway through the park provides a link in the St Helier Town Cycle Network. Springfield currently acts as the polling station for Saint Helier district No. 2.

Jersey Bulls F.C. joined the 2019–20 Combined Counties Football League and play their home games at the stadium.

== Gallery ==
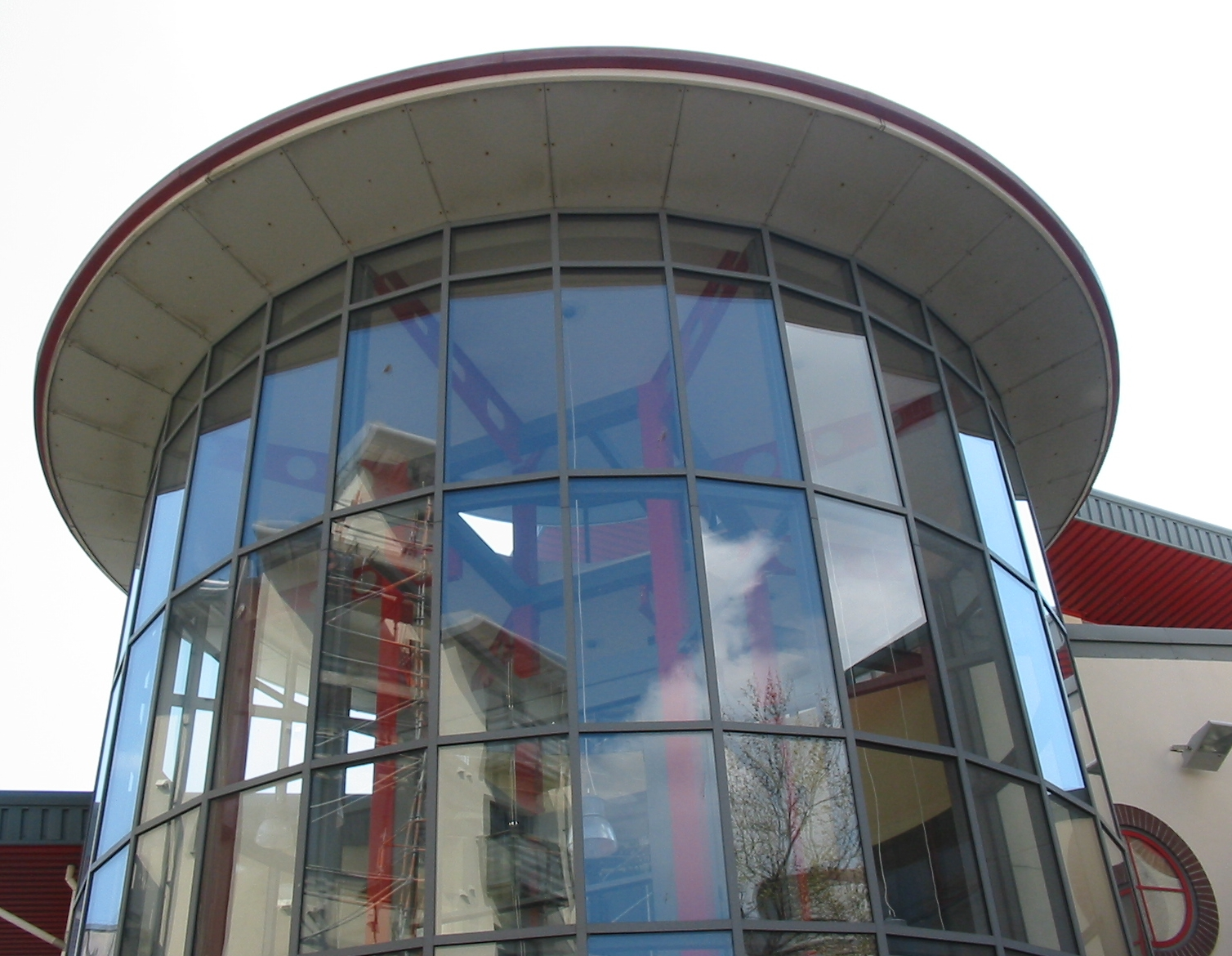

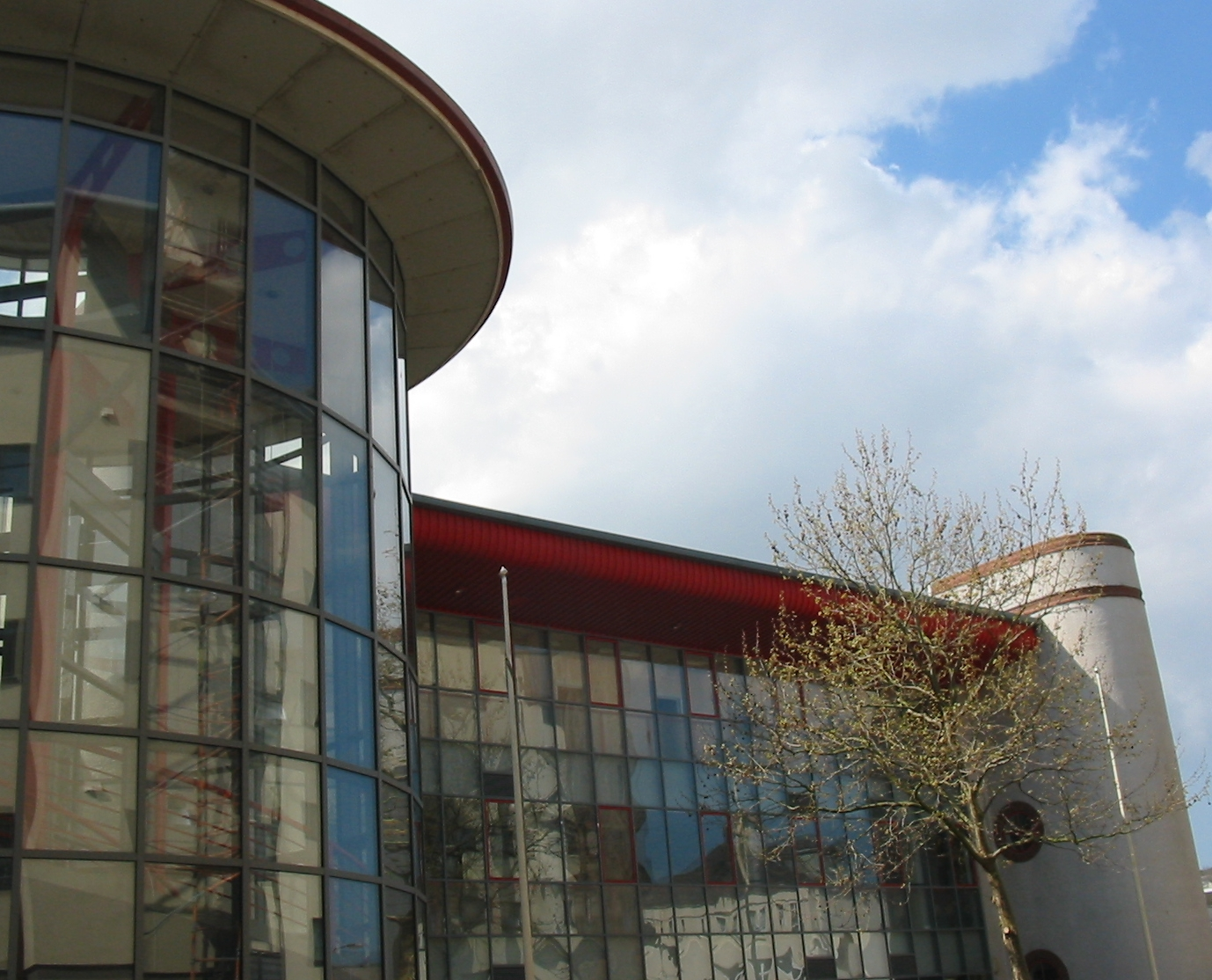

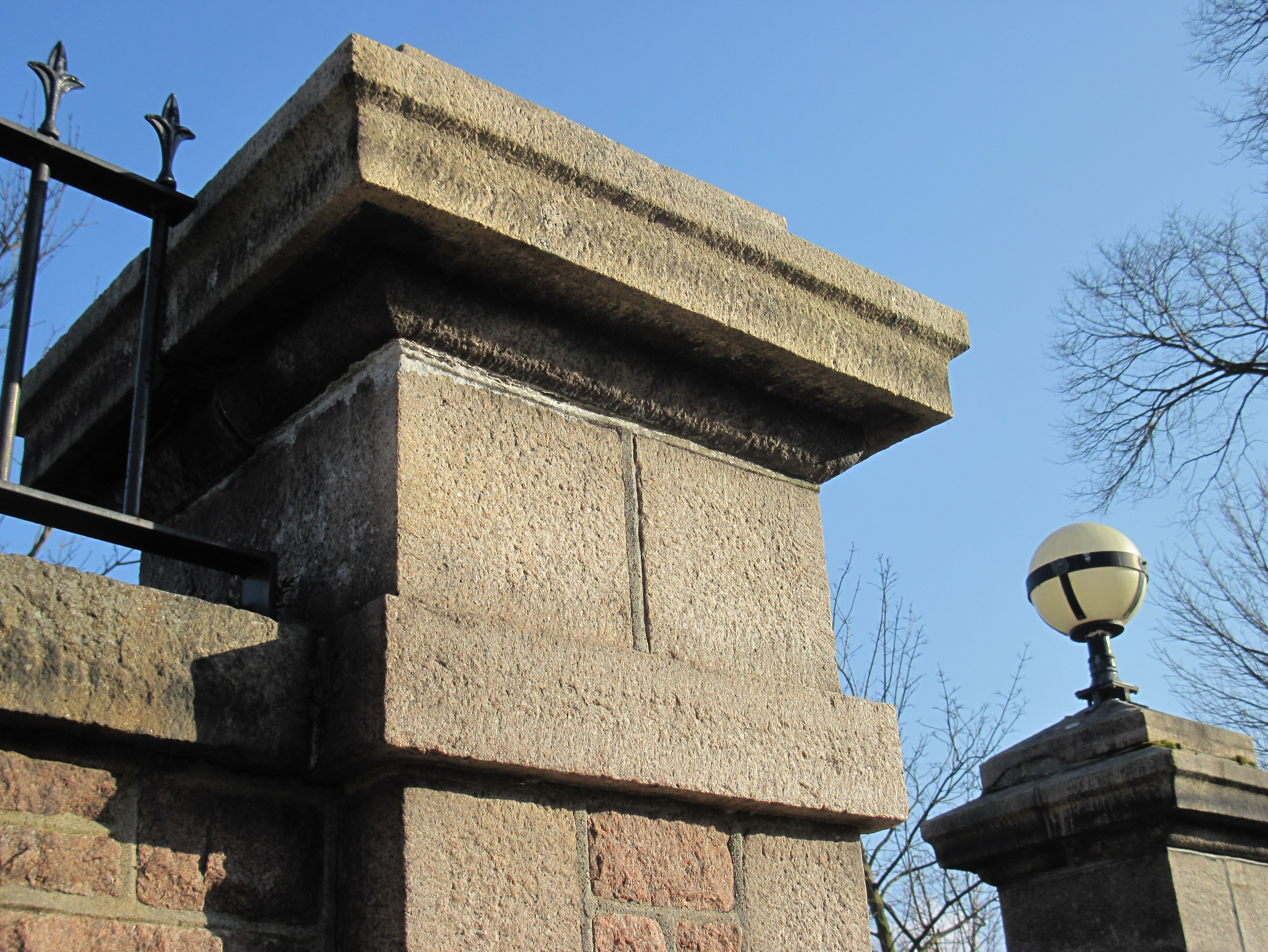
Entrance gates

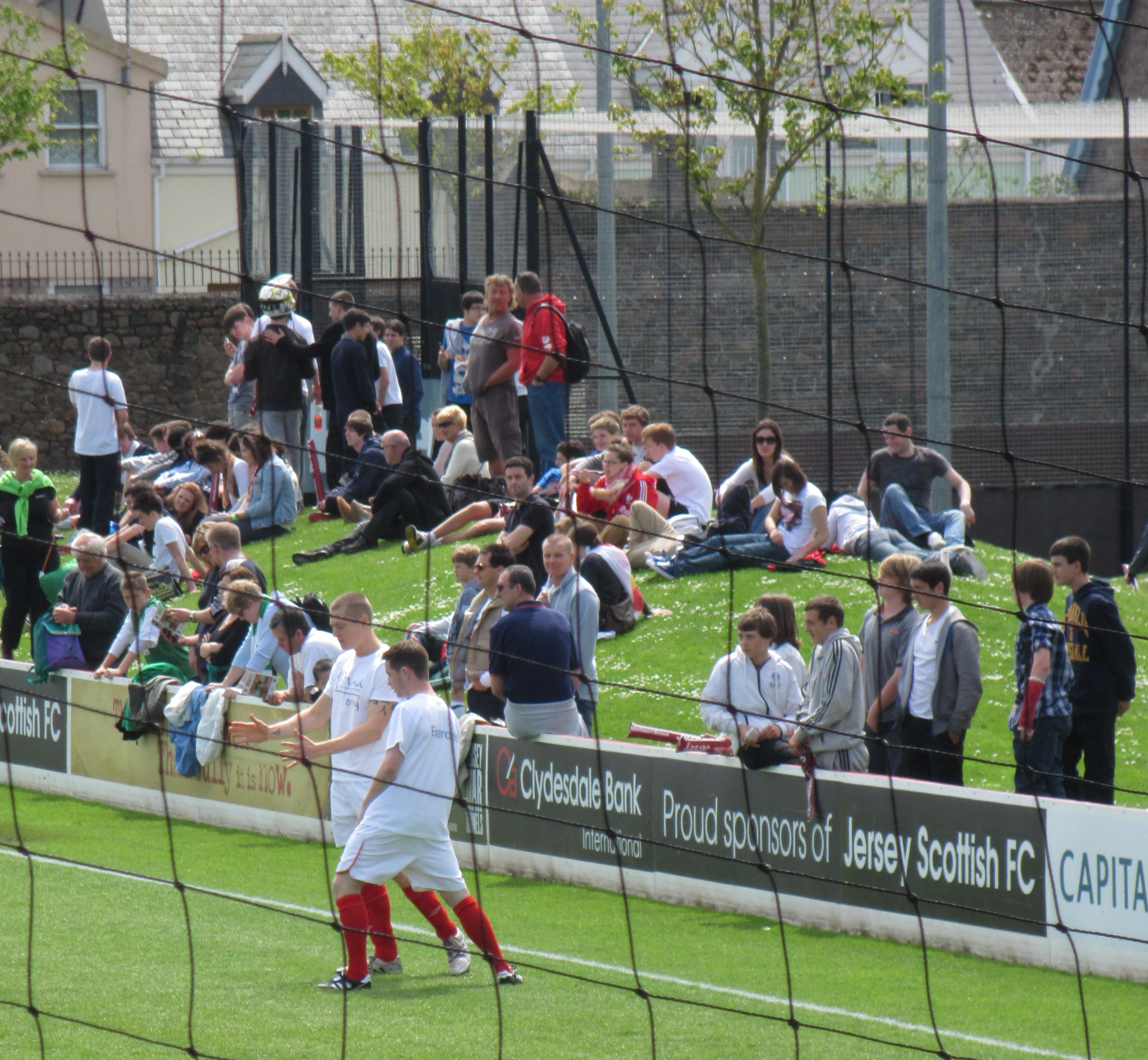
Spectators at the 2012 Muratti final

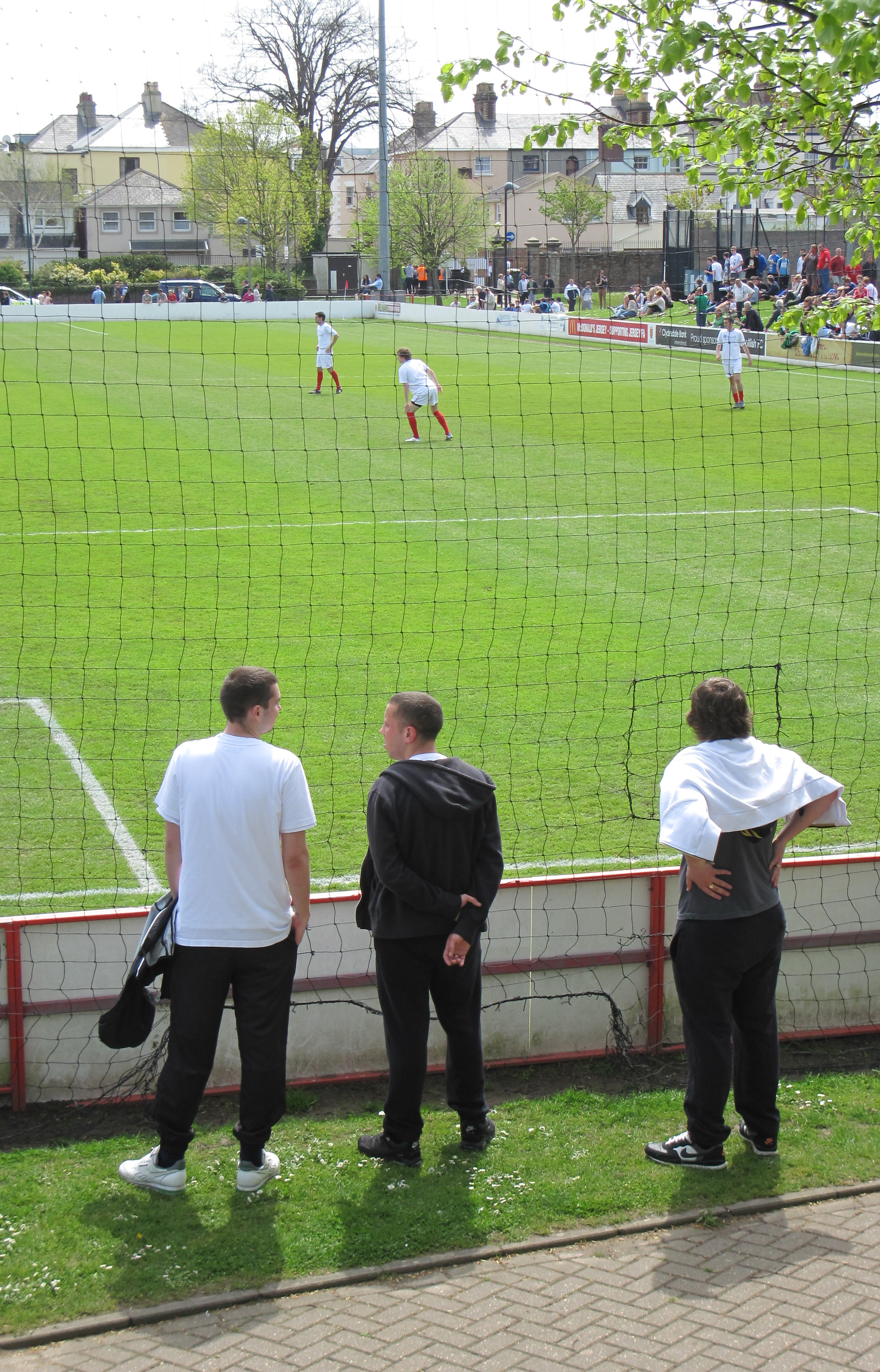
View of the pitch at the 2012 Muratti final

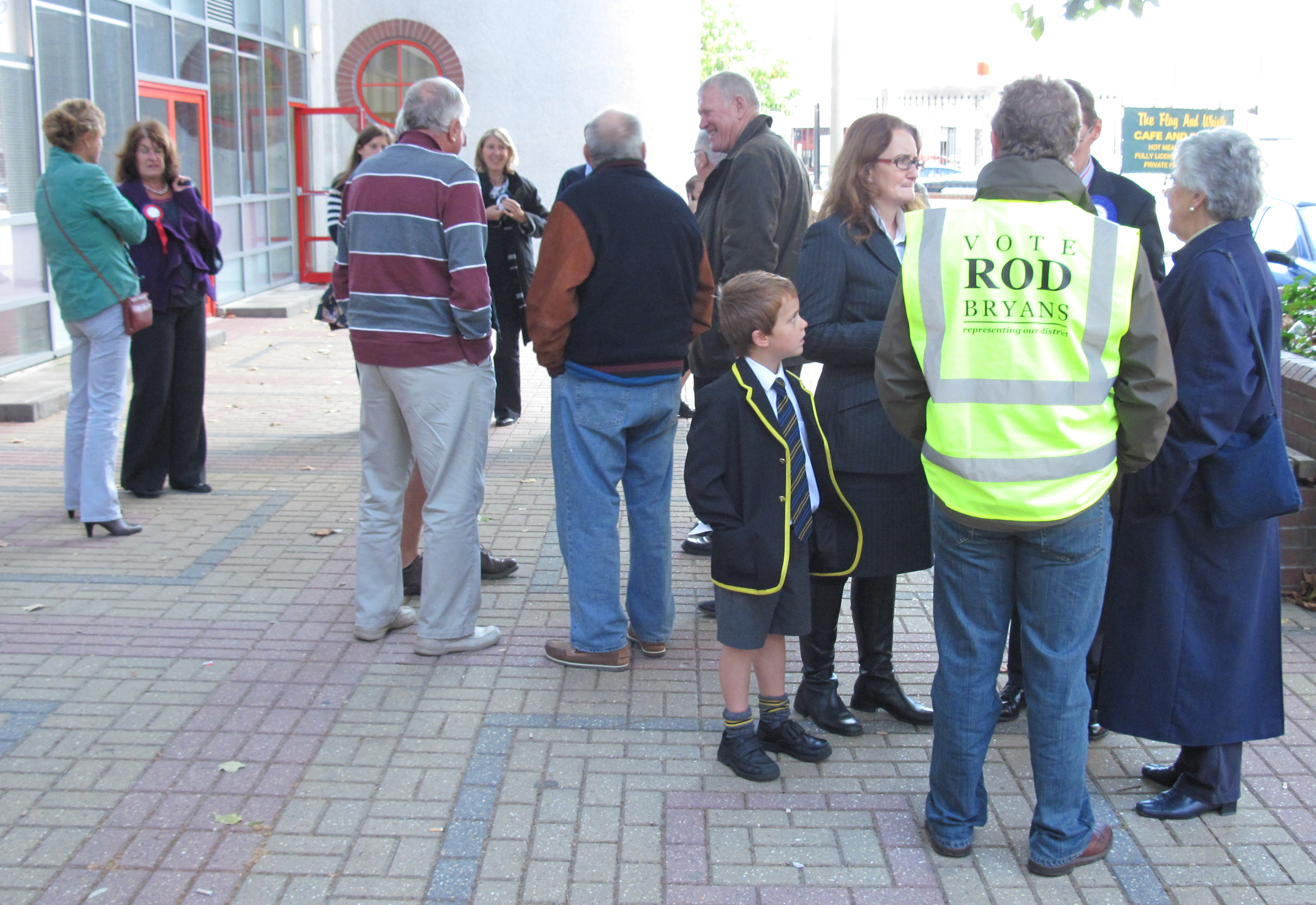
Candidates and supporters outside the polling station, 2011 general election

== See also ==
- FB Playing Fields
