= Jersey Football Association =

- Formation: 1905, 120 Years ago
- Headquarters: Springfield Stadium
- President: Bradley Vowden
- Website: www.jerseyfa.com

The Jersey Football Association (JFA) is the body which co-ordinates football in Jersey. The Jersey FA acts as a County football association of The Football Association, although in 2015 it applied to join UEFA as a full member. The Jersey Football Combination is overseen by the Jersey FA, as is the Jersey official football team.

== History ==
The Jersey Football Association was founded in 1905 and affiliated itself with The Football Association based in England. This became a practice that the other British Crown Dependencies would follow. Though The FA treat Jersey like a county football board, the JFA run their own league system independent from the English football pyramid. During the Occupation of the Channel Islands by Nazi Germany, the JFA was not permitted to function by the Nazis and their pitches were confiscated. At the Liberation, the JFA organised a celebratory match between local Jerseymen and the British Army.

== UEFA application ==
In 2015, the JFA applied for membership in FIFA and UEFA which would allow them to play against other international teams, independent of England. They opted to choose this route versus creating a club side for the English leagues, as neighbouring Guernsey had done with Guernsey F.C. They based their application on the success of the Gibraltar Football Association in the latter's application for Gibraltar to join UEFA. However, UEFA changed its rules following Gibraltar joining to state that membership would only be granted to independent countries. UEFA rejected JFA's application without presenting it to their congress on those grounds.

The JFA took the case against UEFA to the Court of Arbitration for Sport, which ruled in their favour that UEFA must give the JFA the chance to apply. Though Jersey was initially hopeful, the FA, which Jersey had viewed as a key body, declined to support them. Jersey lost the vote in congress with 49 out of 55 against, Iceland abstaining and five not registering a vote. Despite losing the vote, the UEFA president Aleksander Čeferin said he would be prepared to look into assisting Jersey.

=== Aftermath ===
In the aftermath, Jersey player James Scott applied for a Jersey team independent of the JFA to join ConIFA. The application was accepted for the Parishes of Jersey football team to play in ConIFA matches. Also as a result, Jersey Bulls were founded to enter the English football pyramid and were affiliated to the JFA. In 2019, the JFA merged with the Jersey Football Combination, with the JFA taking over the running of league football in Jersey.

In 2023, it was rumored by Greenland Manager Morten Rutkjær, that Jersey were interested in joining CONCACAF.

== Presidents of the Jersey Football Association ==
| # | Name | Period |
|---|---|---|
| 1 | (Jersey) Thos. F. Adderson | 1905–1920 |
| 2 | (Jersey) H. A. Dupre | 1920–1921 |
| 3 | (Jersey) J. Marquis | 1921–1928 |
| 4 | (Jersey) C. W. Duret-Aubin | 1928–1934 |
| 5 | (Jersey) W. P. Le Bas | 1934–1938 |
| 6 | (Jersey) P. Le Quense | 1938–1946 |
| 7 | (Jersey) G. C. H. Le Cocq | 1946–1951 |
| 8 | (Jersey) T. F. Garnier | 1951–1964 |
| 9 | (Jersey) C. J. Dupre | 1964–1976 |
| 10 | (Jersey) J. A. Sherry | 1976–1988 |
| 11 | (Jersey) V. A. Tomes | 1988–1991 |
| 12 | (Jersey) G. A. Mourant | 1991–1994 |
| 13 | (Jersey) Brian Ahier | 1994–2000 |
| 14 | (Jersey) C. Tostevin | 2000–2006 |
| 15 | (Jersey) R. T. Weir | 2006–2012 |
| 16 | (Jersey) Phil J. Austin | 2012–2019 |
| 17 | (Jersey) Bradley Vowden | 2019– |

== Football stadiums in Jersey ==
| Stadium | Capacity | City |
|---|---|---|
| Springfield Stadium | 2,000 | St Helier |

== See also ==
- The Football Association
- Muratti Vase
- Jersey official football team
