= Upton Park Trophy =

Annual association football match in the Channel Islands

- Founded: 1907
- Teams: 2
- Current champions: Jersey Wanderers
- Most championships: (Guernsey) Northerners (18 titles)

The Upton Park Trophy is awarded to the winners of an annual association football match in the Channel Islands between the champions of Guernsey's Priaulx League and Jersey's Football Combination. The venue alternates each year between Guernsey and Jersey: in Guernsey it is usually held at The Track, and in Jersey at Springfield Stadium. Whilst the match is between the Guernsey and Jersey league champions, the trophy belongs to the Guernsey F.A. and the competition is run by them.

The trophy was donated to the Guernsey F.A. by Upton Park F.C. to mark their tenth consecutive annual visit to the island, which they made in 1906.

The term "Upton" is often used to describe other inter-insular sporting events between Channel Island clubs. There is also an under 18s "Upton" called the Portsmouth Trophy and also one for under 16s called the John Leatt Trophy.

== Past results ==
The home club is listed first.

Key to colours
Hosted by Guernsey
Hosted by Jersey

Year	Final			Notes
1907	Northerners (Guernsey)	3 – 0	(Jersey) Caesareans	
1908	Jersey Wanderers	2 – 1	(Guernsey) Northerners	
1909	Northerners (Guernsey)	0 – 1	Jersey Wanderers	
1910	Jersey Wanderers	0 – 1	(Guernsey) Northerners	
1911	Competition suspended			
1912	Jersey Wanderers	1 – 0	(Guernsey) Northerners	
1913	Northerners (Guernsey)	0 – 1	Jersey Wanderers	
1914	Jersey Wanderers	1 – 2	(Guernsey) Northerners	
1915	Competition suspended due to World War I			
1916	Competition suspended due to World War I			
1917	Competition suspended due to World War I			
1918	Competition suspended due to World War I			
1919	Competition suspended due to World War I			
1920	Belgrave Wanderers (Guernsey)	0 – 1	(Jersey) National Rovers	
1921				(Note: Jersey Wanderers & Northerners shared title after a 2 – 2 draw)
1922	Northerners (Guernsey)	1 – 0	Jersey Wanderers	
1923	Old St. Paul's (Jersey)	2 – 1	(Guernsey) Athletics	
1924	Northerners (Guernsey)	4 – 0	Jersey Mechanics	
1925	Jersey Mechanics	4 – 1	Guernsey Rangers	
1926	Northerners (Guernsey)	1 – 0	Jersey Mechanics	
1927	First Tower United (Jersey)	0 – 1	(Guernsey) Northerners	
1928	Northerners (Guernsey)	3 – 0	Jersey Wanderers	
1929	First Tower United (Jersey)	2 – 1	(Guernsey) Northerners	
1930	Northerners (Guernsey)	3 – 2	Jersey Wanderers	
1931	Jersey Wanderers	4 – 0	Guernsey Rangers	
1932	Northerners (Guernsey)	2 – 5	Jersey Wanderers	
1933	Jersey YMCA	2 – 1	(Guernsey) Northerners	
1934	Guernsey Rangers	2 – 0	Jersey YMCA	
1935	Jersey Wanderers	0 – 7	Guernsey Rangers	
1936	Northerners (Guernsey)	3 – 1	(Jersey) Old St Paul's	
1937	First Tower United (Jersey)	2 – 4	(Guernsey) Northerners	
1938	Guernsey Rangers	0 – 4	(Jersey) First Tower United	
1939	Magpies (Jersey)	0 – 1	Guernsey Rangers	
1940	Competition suspended due to World War II			
1941	Competition suspended due to World War II			
1942	Competition suspended due to World War II			
1943	Competition suspended due to World War II			
1944	Competition suspended due to World War II			
1945	Competition suspended due to World War II			
1946	Competition suspended due to World War II			
1947	Beeches OB (Jersey)	0 – 3	(Guernsey) Belgrave Wanderers	
1948	Northerners (Guernsey)	2 – 5	Jersey Wanderers	
1949	Old St Paul's (Jersey)	3 – 0	Guernsey Rangers	
1950	Guernsey Rangers	2 – 1	(Jersey) Old St Paul's	
1951	Old St Paul's (Jersey)	2 – 0	Guernsey Rangers	
1952	Guernsey Rangers	2 – 1	Jersey Wanderers	
1953	Beeches OB (Jersey)	4 – 1	(Guernsey) Northerners	
1954	Guernsey Rangers	1 – 4	(Jersey) Magpies	
1955	Magpies (Jersey)	4 – 1	Guernsey Rangers	
1956	Guernsey Rangers	0 – 1	(Jersey) Beeches OB	
1957	Magpies (Jersey)	3 – 0	(Guernsey) Northerners	
1958	Guernsey Rangers	2 – 3	(Jersey) Beeches OB	
1959	First Tower United (Jersey)	2 – 1	Guernsey Rangers	
1960	Belgrave Wanderers (Guernsey)	2 – 1	Jersey Oaklands	
1961	Beeches OB (Jersey)	0 – 2	(Guernsey) Northerners	
1962	Northerners (Guernsey)	2 – 1	Jersey Wanderers	
1963	Jersey Wanderers	3 – 4	(Guernsey) Northerners	
1964	St. Martins (Guernsey)	4 – 1	Jersey Oaklands	
1965	Georgetown (Jersey)	1 – 3	(Guernsey) St. Martins	
1966	St. Martins (Guernsey)	4 – 1	(Jersey) First Tower United	
1967	Georgetown (Jersey)	0 – 1	(Guernsey) St. Martins	

Year	Final			Notes
1968	Jersey Wanderers	3 – 0	(Guernsey) St. Martins	(Note: Replayed final after a 1 – 1 draw in Guernsey)
1969	First Tower United (Jersey)	2 – 3	(Guernsey) St. Martins	
1970	St. Martins (Guernsey)	3 – 2	(Jersey) First Tower United	
1971	Jersey Wanderers	1 – 2	(Guernsey) St. Martins	
1972	St. Martins (Guernsey)	0 – 4	(Jersey) First Tower United	
1973	First Tower United (Jersey)	3 – 1	(Guernsey) Vale Recreation	
1974	Vale Recreation (Guernsey)	2 – 0	(Jersey) First Tower United	
1975	First Tower United (Jersey)	2 – 0	(Guernsey) Vale Recreation	
1976	Vale Recreation (Guernsey)	2 – 0	(Jersey) First Tower United	
1977	First Tower United (Jersey)	2 – 0	(Guernsey) Vale Recreation	
1978	Guernsey Rangers	1 – 2	(Jersey) First Tower United	
1979	Jersey Oaklands	2 – 3	(Guernsey) St. Martins	
1980	Guernsey Rangers	1 – 2	(Jersey) St. Paul's	
1981	Jersey Wanderers	1 – 2	(Guernsey) Vale Recreation	
1982	Vale Recreation (Guernsey)	0 – 2	(Jersey) St. Paul's	
1983	First Tower United (Jersey)	4 – 2	(Guernsey) Vale Recreation	
1984	Vale Recreation (Guernsey)	1 – 3	(Jersey) First Tower United	
1985	Jersey Wanderers	0 – 3	(Guernsey) St. Martins	
1986	Vale Recreation (Guernsey)	2 – 3	Jersey Wanderers	
1987	St. Paul's (Jersey)	3 – 1	(Guernsey) Vale Recreation	
1988	Vale Recreation (Guernsey)	4 – 2	(Jersey) St. Paul's	
1989	Jersey Wanderers	2 – 1	(Guernsey) Vale Recreation	
1990	Northerners (Guernsey)	4 – 0	Jersey Wanderers	
1991	Sporting Academics (Jersey)	3 – 1	(Guernsey) Northerners	
1992	Jersey Scottish	2 – 0	(Guernsey) Northerners	(Note: Replayed final after a 1 – 1 draw in Guernsey)
1993	Jersey Scottish	5 – 4	(Guernsey) Vale Recreation	
1994	Sylvans (Guernsey)	0 – 1	(Jersey) First Tower United	
1995	First Tower United (Jersey)	1 – 0	(Guernsey) Sylvans	
1996	Sylvans (Guernsey)	1 – 0	Jersey Scottish	
1997	Jersey Scottish	0 – 1	(Guernsey) Sylvans	
1998	Sylvans (Guernsey)	4 – 3	Jersey Scottish	
1999	Jersey Scottish	3 – 1	(Guernsey) Sylvans	
2000	Sylvans (Guernsey)	1 – 2	(Jersey) St. Paul's	
2001	St. Peter (Jersey)	5 – 0	(Guernsey) Sylvans	
2002	St. Peter (Jersey)	3 – 0	(Guernsey) Sylvans	(Note: Replayed final after a 2 – 2 draw in Guernsey)
2003	Trinity (Jersey)	1 – 0	(Guernsey) Vale Recreation	
2004	St. Martins (Guernsey)	0 – 0	Jersey Scottish	(Note: St. Martins won 4-2 on penalties)
2005	Jersey Scottish	2 – 1	(Guernsey) Syvlans	
2006	Belgrave Wanderers (Guernsey)	4 – 1	(Jersey) St. Peter	
2007	Jersey Scottish	3 – 2	(Guernsey) Northerners	
2008	Belgrave Wanderers (Guernsey)	2 – 0	(Jersey) St. Paul's	
2009	St. Paul's (Jersey)	2 – 1	(Guernsey) Northerners	
2010	Belgrave Wanderers (Guernsey)	1 – 3	(Jersey) St. Paul's	
2011	St. Paul's (Jersey)	1 – 2	(Guernsey) St. Martins	
2012	Northerners (Guernsey)	4 – 0	Jersey Scottish	
2013	Jersey Scottish	4 – 0	(Guernsey) Belgrave Wanderers	
2014	Belgrave Wanderers (Guernsey)	0 – 3	(Jersey) St. Paul's	
2015	St. Paul's (Jersey)	9 – 0	(Guernsey) Northerners	
2016	Northerners (Guernsey)	1 – 3	(Jersey) St. Paul's	
2017	St. Paul's (Jersey)	3 – 1	Guernsey Rovers	
2018	Guernsey Rovers	0 – 2	St. Paul's (Jersey)	
2019	St. Paul's (Jersey)	3 – 0	St. Martins (Guernsey)	
2020	Competition suspended due to Coronavirus Pandemic restrictions			
2021	Competition suspended due to Coronavirus Pandemic restrictions			
2022	St. Martins (Guernsey)	2 – 0	St. Clement (Jersey)	
2023	St. Peter (Jersey)	5 – 0	Guernsey Rovers	
2024	Vale Recreation (Guernsey)	1 – 1	St. Clement (Jersey)	(Note: Vale Recreation won 8-7 on penalties)
2025	Grouville (Jersey)	0 – 1	St. Martins (Guernsey)	
2026	Northerners (Guernsey)	1 – 3	Jersey Wanderers	

== Winners/runners-up by club ==
Club	Winners	Runners-up
Northerners (Guernsey)	18 (one shared with Jersey Wanderers)	17
First Tower United (Jersey)	12	7
Jersey Wanderers	12 (one shared with Northerners)	13
St. Martin's (Guernsey)	11	2
St. Pauls (Jersey)	9	2
Jersey Scottish	6	4
Guernsey Rangers	5	12
Vale Recreation (Guernsey)	4	11
Belgrave Wanderers (Guernsey)	4	4
Sylvans (Guernsey)	3	7
Beeches Old Boys (Jersey)	3	2
Old St. Pauls (Jersey)	3	2
Magpies (Jersey)	3	1
St. Peter (Jersey)	2	1
Jersey Mechanics	1	2
Jersey YMCA	1	1
National Rovers (Jersey)	1	1
Sporting Academics (Jersey)	1	0
Trinity (Jersey)	1	0
Jersey Oaklands	0	3
Georgetown (Jersey)	0	2
Althetics (Guernsey)	0	1
Caesareans (Jersey)	0	1
