= Ryan-Zico Black =

Guernsey footballer (born 1981)

Personal information
- Date of birth: 4 August 1981 (age 45)
- Place of birth: Guernsey
- Positions: Midfielder; forward

Team information
- Current team: Guernsey

Youth career
- Vale Recreation
- Southampton
- Bournemouth
- 1998–2000: Morecambe

Senior career*
Years	Team	Apps	(Gls)
1999–2003	Morecambe	94	(14)
2003	Northwich Victoria	6	(0)
2004	Glenavon	8	(2)
2004–2005	Lancaster City		
2005–2006	Kettering Town		
2006	Lancaster City		
2007	Barrow		
2007–2008	Lancaster City	24	(4)
2008–2009	Bamber Bridge	7	(0)
2009	Sunshine George Cross		
2009	Morwell Pegasus		
2009	Bamber Bridge		
2009–2010	AFC Fylde		
2010	Rossendale United		
2010	San Fulgencio		
2011	Vale Recreation		
2011–	Guernsey		
2013	→Vale Recreation (guest)		

International career
2000	Northern Ireland U18	1	(0)
2002	Northern Ireland U21	2	(0)
2005–2017	Guernsey	12	(4)
- * Club domestic league appearances and goals as of 16 October 2020

Ryan-Zico Black (born 4 August 1981) is a Guernsey footballer who plays as a midfielder for Guernsey in the Isthmian League.

He is named after Zico, a Brazilian footballer admired by Black's father. Brazilian broadcaster Globo interviewed Black and presented him with a video message from his famous namesake as well as a signed shirt. In 2012 Black was invited to participate in Zico's annual charity match in Brazil, but had to pull out through injury. However, in 2013 Ryan-Zico was again invited and this time played in midfield and then defence in a match in front of 70,000 fans at Brazil's famous Maracanã Stadium. Although his team lost 7–3, Black scored a goal and afterwards said of the experience "it has to be the highlight of my career".

He released an autobiography in 2008.

== Early life and career ==
Ryan-Zico's father Dessie Black is an Irish Celtic supporter from Belfast. Dessie played football for the Star of the Sea youth club in north Belfast, where he was teammates with Bobby Sands and Raymond McCord as well as players who went on to join Loyalist paramilitary organisations. After moving to England, Dessie played for Fareham and Eastleigh while Black's mother Sue was training to be a nurse in Southampton. The couple returned to Sue's native Guernsey when she had finished her studies and was pregnant with Ryan-Zico.

When Black was born on 4 August 1981, his father wanted to name him Zico in homage to the star Brazilian footballer. Black's mother insisted on Ryan, in case the child disliked football, and a compromise was reached with Ryan-Zico. A sister, Dionne-Maire, was born in 1984 and the family lived in homes with the football-inspired names Rio de Janeiro and San Siro Milan. Black was brought up as a Roman Catholic and attended Notre Dame du Rosaire Primary School and St Peter Port Secondary School.

Black inherited his father's obsession for football and was attached to Southampton between the ages of 11 and 14, travelling over from Guernsey in the school holidays. In Southampton Black stayed in "digs" with the family of one of the club's scouts. When the scout fell into dispute with Southampton and moved to Bournemouth, Black followed him and signed schoolboy forms with the Dorset club.

Bournemouth refused permission for Black to trial with Premier League Leeds United, but at the end of the season did not offer a Youth Training Scheme (YTS) contract. He had already begun playing senior football for Vale Recreation and had broken his arm in a Priaulx League match three weeks before his last training stint at Bournemouth. Also suffering from an ear infection, Black was below par in two under 18 matches before being given the bad news by youth coach Sean O'Driscoll.

Returning to play at Vale Recreation, Black found himself "back at square one". He was still determined to get a YTS contract and embarked on a series of trials with clubs in southern England. He damaged ankle ligaments one day into a six-week stay with Plymouth Argyle then spent two days with Reading. After twice being invited to Exeter City to play in trial games, Black was frustrated to receive a letter stating the club would only take on local players.

At the end of that season, with Black about to turn 17, his hopes of a professional career were receding. His childhood friend Scott Bradford lived in Lancashire after he had won a YTS contract with Preston North End. Calculating that his own chances would be improved if he was based in England, Black moved in with his friend's parents. Bradford had been released due to injury but was allowed to do his preseason training with Preston, and the club allowed Black to join him.

After leaving Preston, the duo played in two preseason friendlies for North West Counties League minnows Squires Gate. Bradford was then offered a trial with Morecambe, of the Football Conference. While watching his friend Black heard about Morecambe starting a new academy. After a successful two week trial he was offered a place on the two year course which combined full-time training under Morecambe's manager Jim Harvey with study at Lancaster and Morecambe College.

During the first season Black left his lodgings abruptly after a controversial bedroom flooding incident. In season 1999–00, Black represented the Lancashire County Football Association at under 19 level, while attending Lancaster and Morecambe College. The College were also runners-up in the English Schools' Football Association under 18 Colleges' Trophy, losing 2–1 to Cirencester College in the final at The Hawthorns.

== Club career ==
=== Morecambe ===
==== 1998–99 ====
In his first season at the academy, Black had broken into the reserve team. After being called into the Northern Ireland youth team, he was pulled aside after training and put on a professional contract: £20-per-week basic with a £30 appearance bonus. Grateful if underwhelmed by the money on offer, Black understood the club's rationale: "I suppose it was in case we done well and got snapped up by another club, Morecambe wouldn't get a penny for us."

==== 1999–2000 ====
In summer 1999 Black was called into pre-season training with Morecambe's first team. He was in the squad for the first game of the 1999–2000 Football Conference season, at home to wealthy bookmakers' favourites Rushden & Diamonds. During the second half he emerged from the substitutes' bench to make his senior debut. He made a further five substitute appearances in the Football Conference, mostly towards the end of the season. At the culmination of his academy course, Black signed a one-year professional contract with another year's option. His wages increased to £120-per-week with an £1,000 signing-on fee. Black was also forced to change lodgings under inauspicious circumstances for a second time, when the hosts – a lesbian couple in their fifties – pummelled youth team player Carl Stanford.

==== 2000–01 ====
Black scored his first senior goal in August 2000, turning in Stewart Drummond's cross for the fourth goal in Morecambe's 4–2 home win over Nuneaton Borough. In October 2000 he then scored one goal and created the other for Phil Eastwood in Morecambe's 2–1 win over Rushden & Diamonds. "Ryan-Zico is full of trickery and inspiration", enthused Harvey to The Daily Telegraph.

When Morecambe faced Ipswich Town in the third round of the 2000–01 FA Cup in January, Black's exotic moniker provided the national media with a useful angle for editorial coverage of the event. Ipswich were third in the Premier League and non-League Morecambe required a "giant killing" to beat them. Black started the match on the left wing and missed Morecambe's best chance in their 3–0 defeat; a moment of hesitation allowed Ipswich's England goalkeeper Richard Wright to smother the chance. Black made a total of 34 league appearances in the 2000–01 Football Conference season, as Morecambe finished in 19th place and narrowly escaped relegation.

==== 2001–02 ====
Morecambe fared better the following season, finishing sixth in the table. During the campaign Black engaged the services of an agent, hoping to facilitate a transfer to a Football League club. But the move backfired by causing a rift with manager Jim Harvey: "The fact was I didn't benefit one little bit and was worse off because Jim had the hump with me for ages and wouldn't play me."

==== 2002–03 ====
In April 2003 Black scored twice in a 3–2 win at Farnborough Town after entering play as a substitute, securing Morecambe's place in the promotion play-offs.

Black left Morecambe with a reputation for being versatile, talented but inconsistent.

=== Kettering Town ===
In November 2005, Black garnered national media attention in becoming Paul Gascoigne's first signing as manager of Conference North club Kettering Town. The move involved a £10,000 transfer fee and made Black one of two full-time professional players at the club, on a two-and-a-half-year contract with an annual salary of £20,000. Somewhat hampered by a hamstring injury, Black was unable to make an impression as Kettering performed poorly and Gascoigne was sacked after 39 days.

Gascoigne's predecessor Kevin Wilson was re-installed as manager and quickly consigned Black to the reserve team. Disheartened, Black asked for his contract to be paid off, only to be told: "no chance". A prospective transfer back to the North West with Barrow also fell through when Kettering demanded a fee to recoup at least part of their outlay. After a month on the sidelines, Black came back into favour with Wilson and scored in a 2–0 win over Lancaster. His enthusiastic goal celebrations upset some players and supporters at his former club.

When Wilson was also sacked shortly afterwards, Morrell Maison became Black's third manager in a matter of weeks. Unimpressed with Maison, Black again requested a transfer at the end of the season: "I didn't feel I could play another season under him. He was a likeable person, but he did my head in at times." Black accepted two months' salary as settlement of the remaining two years on his contract and returned to Lancaster City.

=== Barrow ===
Black immediately negotiated a contract with Barrow, at £60-a-week less than his basic Lancaster City deal, but the difference was more than made up by a lump sum signing-on fee to be paid in three instalments. He started his Barrow career in good form; scoring three goals in his first six games and playing in his favoured central role alongside loanee Tom Pope.

A red card in an FA Trophy defeat at Worcester City, for elbowing Dennis Pearce, led to a three match ban which derailed Black's progress. He returned to the starting line-up two months later but was sent-off again, much to the fury of his manager Phil Wilson. In the next match Black came on as a substitute, but was himself substituted later in the same game; "probably one of the most humiliating things that can happen to you as a footballer."

Frozen out by his manager and with his enthusiasm for the English non-League scene abating, he went on holidays during the season to Guernsey, Rome and Prague with girlfriend Becky. He also stepped-up his social activities, including fondly remembered team nights out in Leeds and Barrow-in-Furness, while considering a fresh challenge in his football career.

=== Spain ===
In the summer of 2007 – after a holiday to India – Black went to Spain with the intention of landing a contract with a local lower division club. The first team he visited, Santa Pola CF, said they already had their squad of 25 and were a closed shop. After approaching around eight different teams, Black was annoyed by their refusal to even let him train: "It's like racism, but not black and white. They don't like the English and want to keep their teams Spanish." CD Jávea eventually did offer terms but Black calculated it was not enough to live on. He was also baffled by the actions of Jávea's English manager Kenny Brown who proffered the contract offer without watching Black play or train.

=== Back in Lancashire ===
Back in Lancashire with renewed respect for English non-League football, Black accepted an offer to rejoin Lancaster City. The club were languishing in the Northern Premier League First Division after reforming in the wake of their financial collapse. He made his debut in a 2–1 home win over FC United of Manchester in front of 2,300 fans. Black continued playing on non-contract terms to keep fit and earn some money while looking to return to a higher level.

In March 2008, out of favour Black was released by City to allow him to join their local Division One rivals Bamber Bridge. Another debut against FC United saw Black set up two goals, but his side lost the promotion play-off 3–2 at Gigg Lane. Early in the following season, Black rejected suggestions that he was returning to Guernsey to play for a new Guernsey United team in the Kent League: "I wouldn't think about dropping any lower than what I'm playing in now. I've dropped a couple of divisions to play in this league."

=== Australia ===
Black quit Bamber Bridge in February 2009, to join Australian club Sunshine George Cross of the Victorian Premier League. When his appearances became sporadic, Black moved on to nearby Morwell Pegasus who played at the lower level Victorian State League Division 2. "I was in and out of Sunshine George Cross because they had a massive squad. Morwell offered me a good deal and the opportunity to play every week. I jumped at the chance."

=== Lancashire again ===
The 2009–10 campaign began with Black back at Bamber Bridge. He was banned for 56 days for being sent-off in a reserve game then arguing with the referee. In November 2009, he signed for AFC Fylde who played in the same division. Injuries caused further disruption to Black's season, before he accepted an offer to join Rossendale United, also of the Northern Premier League First Division North but at the bottom of the table, in March 2010.

=== Return to Guernsey, via Spain ===
In October 2010 Black realised his ambition of playing in Spain, when he joined San Fulgencio CF after recovering from an operation. The team was based on the Costa Blanca and managed by former Morecambe player Gary Williams. He returned to Guernsey in January 2011, signing for Vale Recreation. After receiving clearance from the Royal Spanish Football Federation (RFEF), Black scored three goals in his first two games but was then sent-off in Vale's Guernsey FA Cup semi-final defeat.

For 2011–12, Black signed up with Guernsey; a new club who were joining the English Combined Counties Football League. He scored the club's first ever goal in a 6–5 preseason friendly defeat to AFC Wimbledon at Footes Lane. After scoring eight goals in 32 appearances as Guernsey FC secured a league and cup double, manager Tony Vance told the BBC that Black's contribution to the team was "phenomenal".

A film crew from Globo TV were dispatched from Brazil to film Black in March 2012. The visitors presented Black with a video message and signed shirt from his famous Brazilian namesake. In September 2012, delighted Black received an invitation to play in Zico's annual charity match, which features all-time great footballers from past and present.

Black suffered a badly broken leg in an FA Vase tie at Erith Town in November 2012. The match was delayed for an hour while an ambulance made its way to the ground. Although Guernsey came back from 3–0 down to win 4–3 in extra time, the thoughts of manager Vance were with his injured player: "It's a nasty break unfortunately, I feel devastated for the lad, he's such a cracking guy and so pivotal to us." Black opted to have a metal rod inserted into his leg, in preference to a plaster cast. He intended to come back stronger than ever but was particularly disappointed to be missing the Zico charity match. Luckily, he played the next year and scored as his team lost 7–3.

In August 2013, Black returned to training with Guernsey having been promoted again into the Isthmian League. After 10 months out, he played some games for Vale Recreation to recover his fitness and was recalled to the Guernsey squad in September 2013. He returned to the first team as a substitute in a 3–0 win at Burgess Hill Town.

== International career ==
=== Northern Ireland ===
One of Black's teammates at the Morecambe academy was Matt Spence, whose father Derek had been a professional in the Football League and played for Northern Ireland. The elder Spence had been a neighbour of Black's father Dessie in Belfast. A few months into their academy course, both boys were called to trials for the Northern Ireland national under-18 football team at Lilleshall Hall. As well as running the Morecambe academy and managing the first team, Jim Harvey was assistant to Northern Ireland manager Sammy McIlroy.

I felt extremely proud to be running on the pitch at Dynamo Kiev's stadium for Northern Ireland, my father's country [...] I was representing all my family there and my Dad's friends who were born in Ireland.

— Black on playing for Northern Ireland

At Lilleshall Black was excited but experienced some apprehension because most other players were from bigger Football League or Premier League clubs. But after scoring in all three trial games he played, he was "a bit gutted" to only be named on standby for upcoming UEFA European Under-18 Championship matches with Sweden and the Milk Cup. In April 2000, Black made the squad for the two-legged qualification play-off against Ukraine. (Note: Black's autobiography recalls that he was an unused substitute for the first leg at Seaview and he made his debut in the second leg in Ukraine (both 1–0 defeats). Records indicate that the 1–0 away leg was played first, then the home leg finished 2–2. Ukraine went on to the final where they lost 1–0 to France.) He made his debut in the away leg at Olympic Stadium in Kiev. In an eventful 18-minute substitute cameo he had a goal wrongfully disallowed and was fortunate not to be sent-off. Black had been desperate to play some part in the tie; his last chance to play at under-18 level.

In October 2001 Black was drafted into the Northern Ireland U21 squad by coach Roy Millar. Black bolstered the ranks for the final 2002 UEFA European Under-21 Football Championship qualifier away to Malta U21. The original squad had been depleted when Ciarán Toner, Grant McCann and Owen Morrison were promoted into the senior squad and Warren Feeney and Mo Harkin withdrew with injuries. In meeting up with the squad Black was surprised to encounter his friend from Guernsey Chris Tardif, who had been called up on the strength of a British passport despite having no connection with Ireland. Black was an unused substitute in the 2–2 draw.

A year later Black was called-up for the opening qualifiers of the next Under-21 European Championships. He watched from the substitutes' bench as Northern Ireland lost 1–0 to Spain in their first match, as Tony Capaldi scored a late own goal in Almansa. Black got his first competitive cap for the under-21s in the next qualifier, playing the last 25 minutes of a 1–1 draw with Ukraine at the Ballymena Showgrounds. His only other cap came against Germany in a 1–0 friendly defeat at Windsor Park. Black started the game wearing the number 10 shirt, playing alongside debutant Paddy McCourt. (Note: Black recalls the Ukraine game as his first cap and the Germany game as his last. But the former took place in October 2002 and the latter in February 2002.)

Until 4 October 2013, the Association of Football Statisticians (AFS) website reported that Black won a cap for the Northern Ireland B national football team in February 1999. Although a report in the Daily Mirror suggested it was not Ryan-Zico Black but Kingsley Black who was included in the B squad. The AFS amended the page after the intervention of Wikipedia editors, but continued to attribute two under-18 appearances to Black – against Austria in May 2001 – which were made by Aaron Black of Ayr United.

In November 2001 Sammy McIlroy took a Northern Ireland B team to play Macclesfield Town. Black was named in the squad but could not take part because Morecambe failed to insure him for the match, leaving him "fuming". Black harboured ambitions of playing for the senior Northern Ireland national team, but recognised he would need to be playing at a higher level in his club career before he would be considered.

=== Guernsey ===
Black expressed a desire to play for the Guernsey official football team in March 2003. Despite a shortage of fit strikers, coach Phil Corbet did not give Black a favourable response and named the 2003 Island Games squad without him.

In January 2005 Black publicly restated his interest in representing the Guernsey team. This time he was included in the squad for July's 2005 Island Games, only to suffer an insect bite the day before the tournament began. This ruled him out of Guernsey's opening match against Orkney, but he returned to the team for the next match and scored both goals in a 2–1 win over the Western Isles. He also featured in the final as Guernsey lost 2–0 to hosts Shetland.

In April 2011 Black was recalled to the Island Games squad. He was sent-off in the final group game and was suspended for the semi-final, but returned to play in the 4–2 final defeat to the Isle of Wight.

May 2012 saw Black make his debut in the Muratti competition. He was named man of the match in Guernsey's 2–0 win over perennial rivals Jersey.

== Style of play ==
As an attacking flair player, Black played much of his football for Morecambe as a winger on either side. He was often deployed as an impact substitute while doubts persisted about his stamina and fitness. At times in his career, particularly at Glenavon and during his first spell with Lancaster City, Black has played as a centre forward.

Black's favoured position is that of a playmaker or trequartista, playing centrally between midfield and attack: "My position was just behind the front striker and in front of the midfield. This is my best position and I enjoyed playing here and getting on the ball linking things between midfield and attack." He repeatedly expressed frustration at being dropped or shunted to the wing despite performing well in a central role.

Upon making Black his first signing for Kettering Town, Paul Gascoigne noted his new charge's ability to play in midfield or attack: "He is a versatile player who can score goals from midfield and up front. He will be a great asset".

In an interview with Globo Esporte, Black suggested that a lack of consistency had stopped him reaching the higher levels of the sport. Recalling that transfer rumours had once linked him with Manchester City and Blackburn Rovers, he admitted that although he played very well in spells he had more bad games than top professional players, who have almost none.

== Personal life ==
Black has expressed pride in his unusual name: "I love being called Zico. People sometimes have a go but it's all harmless fun." His mentor from Morecambe, Jim Harvey, believed that Black thrived on the attention brought by his name: "It would be a handicap for some kids to live with, but Ryan loves it. In fact it suits his character. He just loves the publicity it brings."

After Guernsey's promotion in 2012, Black had the club logo tattooed onto his thigh. While convalescing from his leg break sustained in November 2012, Black became a father and got engaged to his girlfriend.

As a 27-year-old, Black had a testicular cancer scare but got the all-clear after visiting his doctor and having an ultrasound scan. In 2013, he joined other prominent island sportsmen in backing the Male Uprising Guernsey (MUG) charity's Check Your Balls campaign.

== Career statistics ==
=== International ===
Appearances and goals by national team and year
National team	Year	Apps	Goals
Guernsey	2005	3	2
Guernsey	2006	–	
Guernsey	2007	–	
Guernsey	2008	–	
Guernsey	2009	–	
Guernsey	2010	–	
Guernsey	2011	3	0
Guernsey	2012	–	
Guernsey	2013	–	
Guernsey	2014	–	
Guernsey	2015	3	2
Guernsey	2016	–	
Guernsey	2017	3	0
Total		12	4

Scores and results list Guernsey's goal tally first, score column indicates score after each Black goal.

List of international goals scored by Ryan-Zico Black
No.	Date	Venue	Opponent	Score	Result	Competition
1	11 July 2005	Public Hall, Cunningsburgh, Shetland	Western Isles	1–1	2–1	2005 Island Games
2	11 July 2005	Public Hall, Cunningsburgh, Shetland	Western Isles	2–1	2–1	2005 Island Games
3	30 June 2015	Springfield Stadium, St Helier, Jersey	Gibraltar	?–0	4–0	2015 Island Games
4	2 July 2015	Springfield Stadium, St Helier, Jersey	Menorca	?–?	2–1	2015 Island Games

== Bibliography ==
- Black, Ryan-Zico (2008). Zico: An Autobiography of a Non-League Footballer. Milton Keynes, England: AuthorHouse. ISBN 978-1434353412.
- Pitts, Steve (2009). "The Strange Case of Ryan Zico Black". 39 Days of Gazza. London, England: John Blake Publishing. ISBN 978-1906015442.
