= Guernsey FA Cup =

- Founded: 2004; 22 years ago
- Region: Guernsey
- Teams: 15 (2023–24)
- Current champions: Vale Recreation (3rd title)
- Most championships: Northerners (7 titles)

The Guernsey FA Cup is the foremost football cup competition for teams playing on the island of Guernsey.

== Teams ==
A total of 15 teams competed for the 2023–24 season. Guernsey Rangers, Guernsey Rovers, St. Martins and Sylvans had multiple teams entering in the tournament that included reserves, veterans, C and D teams.

- Guernsey Rovers (TH)
- Belgrave Wanderers
- CF Independent
- Northerners
- Guernsey Rangers
- Guernsey Rangers C
- Guernsey Rovers C
- St. Martins
- St. Martins D
- St. Martins Vets
- Sylvans
- Sylvans C
- Sylvans res.
- Sylvans Vet
- Vale Recreation

== List of finals ==
=== Finals ===
Following is the list of finals.

| Season | Winners | Result | Runner-up | Notes |
|---|---|---|---|---|
| 2004–05 | St. Martins | 1–0 | Northerners | |
| 2005–06 | Northerners | 2–1 | Belgrave Wanderers | |
| 2006–07 | Sylvans | 2–0 | St. Martins | |
| 2007–08 | Northerners | 2–1 | Belgrave Wanderers | |
| 2008–09 | Belgrave Wanderers | 4–2 | St. Martins | |
| 2009–10 | Guernsey Rangers | 2–1 | Belgrave Wanderers | |
| 2010–11 | Northerners | 3–2 | Belgrave Wanderers | After extra-time |
| 2011–12 | St. Martins | 3–1 | Sylvans | |
| 2012–13 | Belgrave Wanderers | 5–2 | Northerners | |
| 2013–14 | Guernsey Rangers | 3–1 | Belgrave Wanderers | |
| 2014–15 | St. Martins | 3–1 | Sylvans | |
| 2015–16 | Northerners | 2–1 | St. Martins | |
| 2016–17 | Vale Recreation | 4–1 | Formula Scaffolding | |
| 2017–18 | Northerners | 2–1 | St. Martins | |
| 2018–19 | Northerners | 6–0 | St. Martins | |
| 2019–20 | Competition abandoned due to COVID-19 pandemic. | | | |
| 2020–21 | Sylvans | 3–2 | St. Martins | |
| 2021–22 | Northerners | 3–1 | Guernsey Rovers | |
| 2022–23 | Guernsey Rovers | 2–2 | Northerners | Rovers won 5–3 on penalties after extra-time. |
| 2023–24 | Vale Recreation | 2–0 | Northerners | |
| 2024–25 | Northerners | 3–2 | Guernsey Rovers | |
| 2025–26 | Northerners | 3–3 | St. Martins | Northerners won 4–3 on penalties after extra-time. |

=== Winners ===
| Club | Wins | First final won | Last final won | Runner-up | Last final lost | Total final apps. |
|---|---|---|---|---|---|---|
| Northerners | 9 | 2005–06 | 2025–26 | 4 | 2023–24 | 13 |
| St. Martins | 3 | 2004–05 | 2014–15 | 7 | 2025–26 | 10 |
| Belgrave Wanderers | 2 | 2008–09 | 2012–13 | 5 | 2013–14 | 7 |
| Sylvans | 2 | 2006–07 | 2020–21 | 2 | 2014–15 | 4 |
| Guernsey Rangers | 2 | 2009–10 | 2013–14 | 0 | – | 2 |
| Vale Recreation | 2 | 2016–17 | 2023–24 | 0 | – | 2 |
| Guernsey Rovers | 1 | 2022–23 | 2022–23 | 2 | 2024–25 | 3 |

== Sponsorship ==
| Period | Sponsor |
|---|---|
| 2015–16 | AG Accounting |
| 2016–17 | Rossborough Insurance |
| 2021–22 | Fletcher Sport |
| 2022–23 | Offshore Commercial |
