= James Hamon =

English footballer (born 1995)

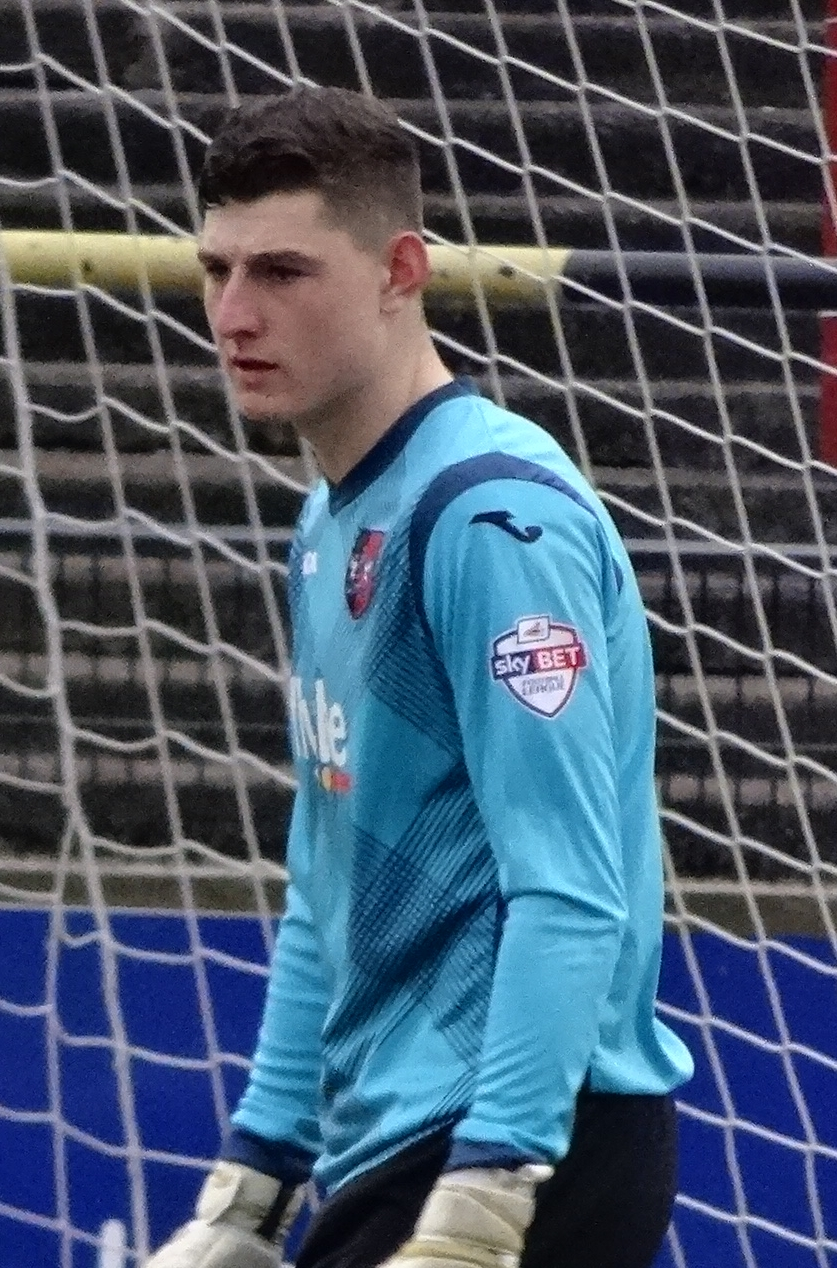
- Hamon playing for Exeter City in 2015

Personal information
- Full name: James Charles Hamon
- Date of birth: 1 July 1995 (age 31)
- Place of birth: Guernsey
- Height: 6 ft 1 in (1.85 m)
- Position: Goalkeeper

Team information
- Current team: Torquay United
- Number: 1

Senior career*
Years	Team	Apps	(Gls)
2011	St. Martins		
2011–2013	Guernsey	14	(0)
2013–2019	Exeter City	27	(0)
2016	→ Hayes & Yeading United (loan)	14	(0)
2018	→ Gloucester City (loan)	13	(0)
2019–2024	Truro City	154	(0)
2021	→ Torquay United (loan)	1	(0)
2024–	Torquay United	74	(0)
- * Club domestic league appearances and goals as of 19:17, 1 February 2026 (UTC)

James Charles Hamon (born 1 July 1995) is a Guernsey-born footballer who plays as a goalkeeper for National League South club Torquay United. He has previously played in the Football League for Exeter City.

== Career ==
Born in Guernsey, Hamon was fast-tracked from Guernsey FA's youth setup to St. Martins, where he made his first-team debuts in 2011, aged only 16; he subsequently moved to Guernsey in the summer, but was mainly a backup to veteran Chris Tardif. He previously had trials at Southampton.

Hamon was invited to a trial at Exeter City in April 2013, signing a deal with the club in September, being assigned number 33. He renewed his link with the Grecians on 30 June 2014.

Hamon played his first match as a professional on 7 October, starting in a 1–3 away loss against Coventry City, for the season's Football League Trophy. He made his League Two debut on 22 November, starting in a 3–2 home win against Shrewsbury Town. He contested the starting goalkeeper place with fellow 19-year-old Christy Pym over the season, finishing with 21 appearances to the latter's 25.

Before the 2015–16 season, Exeter manager Paul Tisdale signed Austrian goalkeeper Bobby Olejnik, who became the regular first-choice goalkeeper at the expense of both Hamon and Pym. On 25 February 2016, Hamon was loaned to Hayes & Yeading United of the National League South for a month. It was later extended for the rest of the season.

Pym later moved back into contention, and made the starting position his own after Olejnik's release in June 2017. On 5 January 2018, Hamon joined Gloucester City, also of the sixth tier, on a three-month loan. He was released by Exeter at the end of the 2018–19 season.

On 30 July 2019, he signed a 12-month contract with Truro City.

On 21 January 2021, Hamon joined National League side Torquay United on a one-month loan deal. On 22 February 2021, the loan was extended for a further month.

On 4 June 2024, Hamon joined Torquay United on a one-year contract.

== Career statistics ==
As of match played 31 January 2026

Appearances and goals by club, season and competition
Club	Season	League			FA Cup		League Cup		Other		Total	
Club	Season	Division	Apps	Goals	Apps	Goals	Apps	Goals	Apps	Goals	Apps	Goals
Guernsey	2011–12	Combined Counties Division One	1	0	0	0	—		0	0	1	0
Guernsey	2012–13	Combined Counties Premier Division	11	0	0	0	—		0	0	11	0
Guernsey	2013–14	Isthmian Division One South	2	0	0	0	—		0	0	2	0
Guernsey	Total		14	0	0	0	—		0	0	14	0
Exeter City	2014–15	League Two	21	0	0	0	0	0	1 (Note: Appearances in the Football League Trophy)	0	22	0
Exeter City	2015–16	League Two	1	0	0	0	0	0	0	0	1	0
Exeter City	2016–17	League Two	1	0	0	0	0	0	1	0	2	0
Exeter City	2017–18	League Two	0	0	0	0	0	0	3	0	3	0
Exeter City	2018–19	League Two	4	0	1	0	0	0	4	0	9	0
Exeter City	Total		27	0	1	0	0	0	9	0	37	0
Hayes & Yeading United (loan)	2015–16	National League South	14	0	—		—		—		14	0
Gloucester City (loan)	2017–18	National League South	13	0	—		—		1 (Note: Appearance in Gloucestershire Senior Challenge Cup)	0	14	0
Truro City	2019–20	SL Premier Division South	29	0	2	0	—		2 (Note: Appearances in FA Trophy)	0	33	0
Truro City	2020–21	SL Premier Division South	8	0	3	0	—		3	0	14	0
Truro City	2021–22	SL Premier Division South	39	0	2	0	—		3	0	44	0
Truro City	2022–23	SL Premier Division South	42	0	1	0	—		4 (Note: Two appearances in FA Trophy, two appearances in Southern League Premier Division South play-offs)	0	44	0
Truro City	2023–24	National League South	36	0	1	0	—		1	0	38	0
Truro City	Total		154	0	9	0	—		13	0	176	0
Torquay United (loan)	2020–21	National League	1	0	—		—		—		1	0
Torquay United	2024–25	National League South	46	0	1	0	—		4 (Note: Three appearances in FA Trophy, one appearance in National League South play-offs)	0	51	0
Torquay United	2025–26	National League South	28	0	1	0	—		1	0	30	0
Torquay United	Total		74	0	2	0	—		5	0	81	0
Career total			297	0	12	0	0	0	28	0	337	0
