= Jersey Football League =

Former Association football league in Jersey

- Founded: 1904
- Folded: 1975
- Country: (Jersey)
- Level on pyramid: 1
- Domestic cup: Le Riche Cup
- Most championships: Jersey Wanderers (14 titles)

The Jersey Football League was the senior football league on the island of Jersey which operated between 1904 and 1975.

Each year, the league champions played the champions of Guernsey's Priaulx League for the Upton Park Trophy.

== History ==
The league was founded in 1904, with the first competition taking place for the 1904–05 season. All winners prior to World War One were military sides, except in 1906 and 1913.

Clubs that won the league three times were awarded trophies outright. 2nd Battalion King's Own Regiment were awarded the original McLean Cup at the end of the 1909–10 season, whilst Jersey Wanderers also were permanently awarded its replacement, The 2nd McLean Cup, at the end of 1921–22 season. The next divisional cup was the Jackson Trophy, with Wanderers again being awarded this one at the end of the 1930–31 season for another three league wins.

From the 1931–32 season the league trophy was known as the James Marquis Memorial Trophy and existed as a perpetual trophy. The trophy was presented by Young Men's Christian Association Football Club in memory of the president of the Jersey Football Association and their club.

The league was succeeded by Jersey Football Combination League in 1975, a merger between the Jersey Football League and the Jersey Saturday League.

== Champions ==
=== 1900s ===
- 1904–05: – 20th Company Royal Garrison Artillery
- 1905–06: – Jersey Wanderers
- 1906–07: – 1st Battalion East Surrey Regiment
- 1907–08: – 1st Battalion East Surrey Regiment
- 1908–09: – 2nd Battalion King's Own Regiment
- 1909–10: – 2nd Battalion King's Own Regiment

=== 1910s ===
- 1910–11: – 2nd Battalion King's Own Regiment
- 1911–12: – 1st Battalion Devon Regiment
- 1912–13: – Jersey Wanderers
- 1913–14: – 1st Battalion Devon Regiment
- 1914–15: – Football suspended due to the First World War
- 1915–16: – Football suspended due to the First World War
- 1916–17: – Football suspended due to the First World War
- 1917–18: – Football suspended due to the First World War
- 1919–19: – Football suspended due to the First World War
- 1919–20: – National Rovers

=== 1920s ===
- 1920–21: – Jersey Wanderers
- 1921–22: – Jersey Wanderers
- 1922–23: – St Paul's
- 1923–24: – Mechanics
- 1924–25: – Mechanics
- 1925–26: – 2nd Battalion East Surrey Regiment
- 1926–27: – First Tower United
- 1927–28: – Jersey Wanderers
- 1928–29: – First Tower United
- 1929–30: – Jersey Wanderers

=== 1930s ===
- 1930–31: – Jersey Wanderers
- 1931–32: – Jersey Wanderers
- 1932–33: – Y.M.C.A.
- 1933–34: – Y.M.C.A.
- 1934–35: – Jersey Wanderers
- 1935–36: – St. Paul's
- 1936–37: – First Tower United
- 1937–38: – First Tower United
- 1938–39: – Magpies
- 1939–40: – No competition due to the Second World War

=== 1940s ===
- 1940–41: – No competition due to the Second World War
- 1941–42: – No competition due to the Second World War
- 1942–43: – No competition due to the Second World War
- 1943–44: – No competition due to the Second World War
- 1944–45: – No competition due to the Second World War
- 1945–46: – No competition due to the Second World War
- 1946–47: – Beeches Old Boys
- 1947–48: – Jersey Wanderers
- 1948–49: – St. Paul's
- 1949–50: – St. Paul's

=== 1950s ===
- 1950–51: – St. Paul's
- 1951–52: – Jersey Wanderers
- 1952–53: – Beeches Old Boys
- 1953–54: – Magpies
- 1954–55: – Magpies
- 1955–56: – Beeches Old Boys
- 1956–57: – Magpies
- 1957–58: – Beeches Old Boys
- 1958–59: – First Tower United
- 1959–60: – Oaklands

=== 1960s ===
- 1960–61: – Beeches Old Boys
- 1961–62: – Jersey Wanderers
- 1962–63: – Jersey Wanderers
- 1963–64: – Oaklands
- 1964–65: – Georgetown
- 1965–66: – First Tower United
- 1966–67: – Georgetown
- 1967–68: – Jersey Wanderers
- 1968–69: – First Tower United
- 1969–70: – First Tower United

=== 1970s ===
- 1970–71: – Jersey Wanderers
- 1971–72: – First Tower United
- 1972–73: – First Tower United
- 1973–74: – First Tower United
- 1974–75: – First Tower United

=== Number of titles by winning clubs ===
- Jersey Wanderers – 14 titles
- First Tower United – 12 titles
- Beeches Old Boys – 5 titles
- St Paul's – 5 titles
- Magpies – 4 titles
- 2nd Battalion King's Own Regiment – 3 titles
- 1st Battalion Devon Regiment – 2 titles
- 1st Battalion East Surrey Regiment – 2 titles
- Georgetown – 2 titles
- Mechanics – 2 titles
- Oaklands – 2 titles
- Y.M.C.A. – 2 titles
- 2nd Battalion East Surrey Regiment – 1 title
- 20th Company Royal Garrison Artillery – 1 title
- National Rovers – 1 title
