= First Tower United F.C. =

Association football club in Jersey

Coordinates: 49.216346°N 2.177542°W

First Tower United
- Full name: First Tower United Football Club
- Founded: 1920
- League: Jersey Football Combination Championship 2
- 2025–26: 5th of 7

First Tower United F.C. is a football club based on the Channel Island of Jersey. They are affiliated to the Jersey Football Association. They formerly played in Jersey Football Combination Premiership, and are currently playing in Championship 2. The club plays in white and blue. They were the second most successful club in the island after Jersey Wanderers, having won the Jersey League 19 times.

== History ==
The club was founded in 1920 and won their first championship in 1927 in the Jersey Football League. This entitled them to take on the winners of the Guernsey Priaulx League, Northerners A.C. in the Upton Park Trophy, though they lost 1–0. They won the championship again in 1929 and this time followed it up by winning the Upton Park Trophy, beating Northerners 2–1 after extra time. The club won back-to-back championships in 1937 and 1938, and won the trophy again in 1938. Another double was completed in 1959, and another championship, but no trophy, in 1966.

The 1968–69 season marked the start of a golden age for the club. The championship was won again in 1969 (though the trophy final ended in defeat), with the same result in the 1969–70 season. Following a year without a trophy, the club won seven consecutive championships from 1972 until 1978, doing the double on five occasions. This period of success coincided with steel magnate, and later owner of Blackburn Rovers, Jack Walker becoming a patron of the club in 1975, following a conversation with his postman. Financial input from Walker meant the club were consistently the best in Jersey, but did not have their own ground. Seven years after becoming involved with the club, Walker bought La Hague Manor for £1.2 million, leasing it back to St George's Preparatory School on the condition that part of the site was developed into a new stadium for the club. Walker was later made an Honorary Life Vice President of the club.

The club won back-to-back championships in 1983 and 1984 and again in 1994 and 1995, also winning the trophy on each occasion. However, the 1995 trophy win has been their last honour to date.

Between 1978 and 1998 the club also played in the FA Vase, a competition for Non-League football clubs in England, with three of their cup runs reaching the third round.

The club suffered a first top flight relegation in its history, with mathematical relegation confirmed with a 4–0 defeat at the hands of Jersey Scottish on Tuesday 26 February 2008. That was the club's twelfth defeat in twelve league games, and meant that La Hague Manor hosted Division Two football for the first time in the 2008–09 season.

After one season in Division 1, First Tower Utd FC was promoted to Jersey's Premier League in 2009.

The 2011–12 season again saw them relegated from the top tier.

In the 2014–15 season the club were demoted from the Premiership to the Championship before the season commenced. They were unable to raise enough players for the reserve team, and Jersey regulations prevent sides without second teams from competing in the island's top-flight.

== Stadium ==
The club's home is in the grounds of La Hague Manor, which is also the site of St George's Preparatory School, in the parish of St Peter. The pitch is lined on one side by a stand that can accommodate just under 80 people. On the opposite side of the pitch stand the two team dugouts, with a training and warm-up area located behind this with floodlights. Towards the corner of the complex are the changing rooms, club house and car park. The achievements and glories of the club's past adorn the walls of the clubhouse reflecting the club's rich history.

== Records ==
- Best FA Vase performance: Third round, 1979–80, 1992–93 (replay), 1996–97

== Honours ==
- Jersey Football League & Jersey Football Combination
  - Champions 1926–27, 1928–29, 1936–37, 1937–38, 1958–59, 1965–66, 1968–69, 1969–70, 1971–72, 1972–73, 1973–74, 1974–75, 1975–76, 1976–77, 1977–78, 1982–83, 1983–84, 1993–94, 1994–95
- Le Riche Cup
  - Winners 1977, 1982, 1984, 1999
- Upton Park Trophy
  - Winners 1929, 1938, 1959, 1972, 1973, 1975, 1977, 1978, 1983, 1984, 1994, 1995
  - Runners-up 1927, 1937, 1966, 1969, 1970, 1974, 1976
