= Football at the 2015 Island Games =

Tournament details
- Host country: Jersey
- Dates: 28 June – 3 July
- Teams: Men's 16; Women's 11
- Venue: 8 (in 1 host city)

Football at the 2015 Island Games took place from 28 June – 3 July 2015 in Jersey. Matches were played at Springfield Stadium.

== Events ==
=== Medal table ===
* Host nation (Jersey)

Rank	Nation	Gold	Silver	Bronze	Total
1	Guernsey	1	0	0	1
1	Jersey*	1	0	0	1
3	Isle of Man	0	1	0	1
3	Åland	0	1	0	1
5	Gotland	0	0	1	1
5	Menorca	0	0	1	1
Totals (6 entries)		2	2	2	6

=== Medal summary ===
Event	Gold	Silver	Bronze
Men	Guernsey; Ross Allen; Ryan-Zico Black; Scott Bougourd; Sam Cochrane; Tom De La Mare; Jamie Dodd; Glyn Dyer; Simon Geall; Dominic Heaume; Jacques Isabelle; Alex Le Prevost; Matthew Loaring; Jakub Machlowski; Angus Mackay; Kieran Mahon; Liam Mahon; Marc Mcgrath; Thomas Strawbridge; Chris Tardif; Craig Young	Isle of Man; Chris Bass; Daniel Bell; Sam Caine; Liam Cowin; Adam Cregeen; Andrew Crenell; Conor Doyle; Lee Gale; Alex Harrison; Frank Jones; Josh Kelly; Marc Kelly; Dominic McGreery; Ciaran McNulty; Jack McVey; John Myers; Damyan Petkov; Max Thomas; Ashley Webster; Matty Woods	Menorca; Josep Arguimbau Genestar; Sergi Mercaqdal Aruimbau; Izam Canet Castell; Miquel Capo Payeras; Jose Enrich Arguimbau; Carlos Febrer Pons; Victor Finestres Cabo; Victor Lebrero Fernández; Helenio Olives España; Joan Pons Mora; Isaias Pons Pons; Pablo Rioja Moll; David Seguí Gomila; Albert Segui Pons; Cristian Triay Sintes; Marc Urbina Rubio
Women	Jersey; Catarina Andrade; Marta Ascensao; Chantelle Audrain; Liberty Barnett; Michelle Bichard; Jodie Botterill; Sophie Botterill; Rose Corbett; Lara Couvert; Jemma Daniel; Kelly Hughes; Aimee Louise Le Quelenec; Fiona McKinnon; Holly Muirhead; Catherine Overbury; Candice Parsons; Lauren Quemard; Sylvia Spinola; Jessica Viera; Eva Watson	Åland Islands; Ellen Ahlström; Nona Bamberg; Josefine Danielsson; Carin Ekström; Josefine Flöjt; Mimmi Hellsten; Lina Holm; Michaela Holmborg; Moa Holmström; Hanna Karlsson; Maryette Karring; Melanie Karring; Felicia Lampen; Maja Lindqvist; Elin Lindström; Sofia Lindström; Fanny Måsabacka; Anna Mattsson; Annica Sjölund; Daiela Svebelius	Gotland; Sissela Andersson; Ellinor Ericsson; Ronja Fröberg; Anna Gottfridsson; Hilda Gustafsson; Erica Henriksson; Marie Höglund; Jennie Karlsson; Maritza Liljeström; Ejla Lillro; Viktoria Nygren; Mikaela Orleifsson; Amanda Rohnström; Camilla Ronström; Louise Ruthström; Ellen Sandström; Frida Starkenberg
