= Dave Waterman =

Footballer (born 1977)

Personal information
- Full name: David Graham Waterman
- Date of birth: 16 May 1977 (age 49)
- Place of birth: Guernsey
- Height: 1.78 m (5 ft 10 in)
- Positions: Defender; midfielder

Youth career
- Belgrave Wanderers
- Northerners
- 1993–1996: Portsmouth

Senior career*
| Years | Team | Apps | (Gls) |
| 1996–2002 | Portsmouth | 80 | (0) |
| 2002–2004 | Oxford United | 47 | (1) |
| 2004–2006 | Weymouth | 39 | (0) |
| 2006–2007 | Gosport Borough | | |
| 2008–2009 | Bognor Regis Town | | |

International career
| 1998–1999 | Northern Ireland U21 | 14 | (0) |
- * Club domestic league appearances and goals as of 17:51, 29 August 2018 (UTC)

David Graham Waterman (born 16 May 1977) is a former footballer who played professionally as a defender and midfielder for Portsmouth and Oxford United.

Born in Guernsey, he represented Northern Ireland at youth International level.

== Club career ==
Waterman began to play youth football his native Guernsey at the age of five, playing for Belgrave Wanderers before switching to Northerners three years later. Following being spotted by Portsmouth scout Dave Hurst on a trip to England, Waterman joined Portsmouth as a trainee in 1993.

On 25 August 1996, Waterman made his professional debut for Portsmouth as a substitute in a 1–0 loss against Ipswich Town. Waterman made 88 appearances in all competitions for Portsmouth.

On 28 March 2002, Waterman signed for Oxford United. On 22 October 2002, Waterman scored his first goal in professional football in a 3–2 away loss to Bournemouth in the Football League Trophy.

In July 2004, Waterman signed for non-league club Weymouth. In January 2006, Waterman left the club.

Waterman finished his career playing at south-coast clubs Gosport Borough and Bognor Regis Town.

== International career ==
Waterman played 14 times for Northern Ireland U21, for whom he qualified for through his mother.
