= Division 1 (Guernsey) =

- Founded: 1896; 130 years ago
- Country: Guernsey
- Divisions: 1
- Number of clubs: 8
- Feeder to: Priaulx League
- Domestic cup: Mauger Cup
- Current champions: Sylvans Reserves (2025–26)
- Most championships: Northerners (36)
- Website: Results website

Division 1, formerly Jackson League, is a Guernsey, (Channel Islands) amateur league for association football clubs. It is the reserve league for Priaulx League clubs in Guernsey along with Bavaria Nomads from Alderney and Centrals, with no automatic relegation or promotion, but if a club wins the league they can apply for election to the Priaulx League. New clubs can also apply for membership through Guernsey Football League Management LBG, (prior to 2016 the Guernsey Football Association), who run the league along with all other football on the island.

The competition was known as the Jackson League until the beginning of the 2017–18 season, after which it was renamed to Division 1.

The current holders are Rovers Reserves.

== Sponsors ==
The league has had a number of sponsors over the years, the first being Rothmans International and the current sponsors being FNB International Wealth Management Limited, a financial institution based in Guernsey.

== Member teams 2023–24 ==
The current member clubs are:

- Belgrave Wanderers Reserves
- Northerners Reserves
- Rangers Reserves
- Rocquaine Pirates
- Rovers Reserves
- St Martin's Reserves
- Sylvans Reserves
- Vale Recreation Reserves

== Past league winners ==
Past winners of the league are:

=== 1896 to 1900 ===
1896-97 Guernsey Rangers

1897-98 Northerners

1898-99 Northerners

1899-1900 Guernsey Rangers

=== 1900 to 1910 ===
1900-01 Guernsey Rangers

1901-02 Northerners

1902-03 Northerners

1903-04 Belgrave Wanderers

1904-05 Guernsey Rangers

1905-06 Northerners

1906-07 Northerners

1907-08 Northerners

1908-09 Northerners

1909-10 Northerners

=== 1910 to 1920 ===
1910-11 Belgrave Wanderers & Progressives (joint holders)

1911-12 Guernsey Rangers

1912-13 St Martin's

1913-14 Northerners

1914-19 No Competition due to outbreak of World War I

1919-20 Northerners

=== 1920 to 1930 ===
1920-21 Northerners

1921-22 Northerners

1922-23 Northerners

1923-24 Northerners

1924-25 Northerners

1925-26 Northerners

1926-27 Northerners

1927-28 Guernsey Rangers

1928-29 Northerners

1929-30 Athletics

=== 1930 to 1940 ===
1930-31 Gasco AC

1931-32 Guernsey Rangers

1932-33 Belgrave Wanderers

1933-34 Guernsey Rangers

1934-35 Northerners

1935-36 Northerners

1936-37 Northerners

1937-38 2nd Batt. The Sherwood Foresters

1938-39 Northerners

1939-40 No Competition due to outbreak of World War II

=== 1940 to 1950 ===
1940-46 No Competition due to outbreak of World War II

1946-47 Vauxbelets Old Boys

1947-48 Sylvans

1948-49 Centrals

1949-50 Centrals & Vale Recreation (Joint holders)

=== 1950 to 1960 ===
1950-51 Vale Recreation

1951-52 Centrals

1952-53 Northerners

1953-54 Vale Recreation

1954-55 Pessimists

1955-56 Northerners

1956-57 Guernsey Rangers

1957-58 Guernsey Rangers

1958-59 Northerners

1959-60 Northerners

=== 1960 to 1970 ===
1960-61 Belgrave Wanderers

1961-62 Sylvans

1962-63 Sylvans

1963-64 Northerners

1964-65 Belgrave Wanderers

1965-66 Vale Recreation

1966-67 Centrals

1967-68 St Martin's

1968-69 Vale Recreation

1969-70 Belgrave Wanderers

=== 1970 to 1980 ===
1970-71 Belgrave Wanderers

1971-72 Vale Recreation

1972-73 Vale Recreation

1973-74 Vale Recreation

1974-75 St Martin's

1975-76 St Martin's

1976-77 St Martin's

1977-78 St Martin's

1978-79 Vale Recreation

1979-80 St Martin's

=== 1980 to 1990 ===
1980-81 Vale Recreation

1981-82 Vale Recreation

1982-83 Rovers

1983-84 Northerners

1984-85 Vale Recreation

1985-86 Northerners

1986-87 Sylvans

1987-88 St Martin's

1988-89 Belgrave Wanderers

1989-90 Northerners

=== 1990 to 2000 ===
1990-91 St Martin's

1991-92 Sylvans

1992-93 Sylvans

1993-94 St Martin's

1994-95 Sylvans

1995-96 St Martin's

1996-97 Northerners

1997-98 Belgrave Wanderers

1998-99 Vale Recreation

1999-2000 Vale Recreation

=== 2000 to 2010 ===
2000-01 Northerners

2001-02 St Martin's

2002-03 Northerners

2003-04 Northerners

2004-05 Vale Recreation

2005-06 Belgrave Wanderers

2006-07 Northerners

2007-08 Belgrave Wanderers

2008-09 No competition due to restructuring of Guernsey Football

2009-10 St. Martins

=== 2010 to 2020 ===
- 2010–11: – Guernsey Rangers
- 2011–12: – Northerners
- 2012–13: – Belgrave Wanderers
- 2013–14: – Edmundsons North
- 2014–15: – Alderney Nomads
- 2015–16: – Northerners AC Reserves
- 2016–17: – Rovers AC Reserves
- 2017–18: – Vale Recreation
- 2018–19: – Vale Recreation
- 2019–20: – Void due to COVID-19 pandemic restrictions

=== 2020 to 2026 ===
- 2020–21: – Northerners Reserves - Red Lion
- 2021–22: – Rocquaine Pirates
- 2022–23: – Rovers Reserves
- 2023–24: – Rocquaine Pirates
- 2024–25: – St Martin's Reserves
- 2025–26: – Sylvans Reserves

== Titles by club ==
| Club | Jackson League Titles |
|---|---|
| Northerners | 36 |
| Vale Recreation | 15 (Once jointly with Centrals) |
| St. Martin's | 13 |
| Belgrave Wanderers | 11 (Once jointly with Progressives) |
| Guernsey Rangers | 11 |
| Sylvans | 7 |
| Centrals | 4 (Once jointly with Vale Recreation) |
| 2nd Batt. The Sherwood Foresters | 1 |
| Athletics | 1 |
| Gasco AC | 1 |
| Pessimists | 1 |
| Progressives | 1 (Jointly with Belgrave Wanderers) |
| Guernsey Rovers | 1 |
| Vauxbelete Old Boys | 1 |

== Other Guernsey football leagues ==
- Priaulx League
- Under 18 Development League
- Under 16 Development League
- Under 14 Development League
- Veterans League
- Deloitte Corbet Cup
- Women's League
