= Northerners A.C. =

Association football club in Guernsey

Coordinates: 49.483747°N 2.546985°W

Northerners
- Full name: Northerners Athletic Club
- Founded: 1892
- Ground: Northfield, Saint Sampson
- League: Priaulx League
- 2025–26: 1st of 7

Northerners AC is a football club based on the Channel Island of Guernsey. They are affiliated to the Guernsey Football Association and play in the FNB Priaulx League.

== History ==
Formed in 1892, Northerners AC is the oldest club in Guernsey. Their 33 league championships and eight Guernsey FA Cups also makes them the most successful club on the island.

They won the Upton Park Trophy in 2012, the most recent of their 18 wins in the competition.

== Honours ==
- Priaulx League – Champions (33): 1899–1900, 1900–01, 1902–03, 1907–08, 1909–10, 1912–13, 1920–21, 1921–22, 1923–24, 1925–26, 1926–27, 1927–28, 1928–29, 1929–30, 1931–32, 1932–33, 1935–36, 1936–37, 1947–48, 1952–53, 1956–57, 1960–61, 1961–62, 1962–63, 1989–90, 1990–91, 1991–92, 2006–07, 2008–09, 2011–12, 2014–15, 2015–16, 2025–26
- Division 1 (Note: Division 1 is predominantly the reserve league in Guernsey, with no automatic relegation or promotion, but if a club's first team wins the league they can apply for election to the Priaulx League) – Champions (38): 1897–98, 1898–99, 1901–02, 1902–03, 1905–06, 1906–07, 1907–08, 1908–09, 1909–10, 1913–14, 1919–20, 1920–21, 1921–22, 1922–23, 1923–24, 1924–25, 1925–26, 1926–27, 1928–29, 1934–35, 1935–36, 1936–37, 1938–39, 1952–53, 1958–59, 1959–60, 1963–64, 1983–84, 1985–86, 1989–90, 1996–97, 2000–01, 2002–03, 2003–04, 2006–07, 2011–12, 2015–16 (reserves), 2020–21 (Red Lion)
- Guernsey FA Cup – Winners (9): 2005–06, 2007–08, 2010–11, 2015–16, 2017–18, 2018–19, 2021–22, 2024–25, 2025–26
- Upton Park Trophy – Winners (18): 1907, 1910, 1914, 1921 (shared), 1922, 1924, 1926, 1927, 1928, 1930, 1936, 1937, 1961, 1962, 1963, 1990, 1992, 2012
