= Magpies F.C. =

Former association football club in Jersey

Magpies
- Full name: Magpies Football Club
- Founded: 24 May 1924
- Dissolved: 2015

Magpies F.C. was a football club based on the Channel Island of Jersey. They were affiliated to the Jersey Football Association and played in the Jersey Football League and the Jersey Football Combination.

== History ==
The club was formed on 24 May 1924 and played in the Jersey Football League, claiming their first league title in 1938–39. The club's heyday in the mid 1950s, winning titles in 1954, 1955 and 1957 and The Upton three times.

In July 2014 the club withdrew from the Jersey Football Combination Championship, unable to find a manager and sufficient players. They kept their affiliation to the league but the club chose to fold in April 2015.

== Honours ==
Information sourced from RSSSF.

- Jersey Football League – Champions (4): 1938–39, 1953–54, 1954–55, 1956–57
- Upton Park Trophy – Winners (3): 1954, 1955, 1957
- W.E. Guiton Memorial Trophy – Winners: (4) 1933–34, 1946–47, 1952–53, 1953–54
- St. Paul's Trophy/ Jersey Football Combination Division Two – Winners (2): 1986–87, 1995–96
- Charity Cup – Winners (9): 1935–36, 1938–39, 1949–50, 1950–51, 1951–52, 1955–56, 1956–57, 1959–60, 1971–72
