= The Track (stadium) =

Multi-use stadium in Saint Sampson, Guernsey

Coordinates: 49.4740°N 2.5410°W

- Interactive map of The Track
- Full name: The Track
- Location: Saint Sampson, Guernsey
- Owner: Guernsey Amalgamated Football Committee
- Capacity: 3,000
- Surface: Grass
- Record attendance: 12,692

Tenants
- Belgrave Wanderers; Guernsey official football team

The Track is a multi-use stadium in Saint Sampson, Guernsey. It is the home ground of association football team Belgrave Wanderers F.C. and is also used to host Guernsey official football team's home Muratti games. It also has Guernsey's only kart racing track around the outside.

== Ownership ==
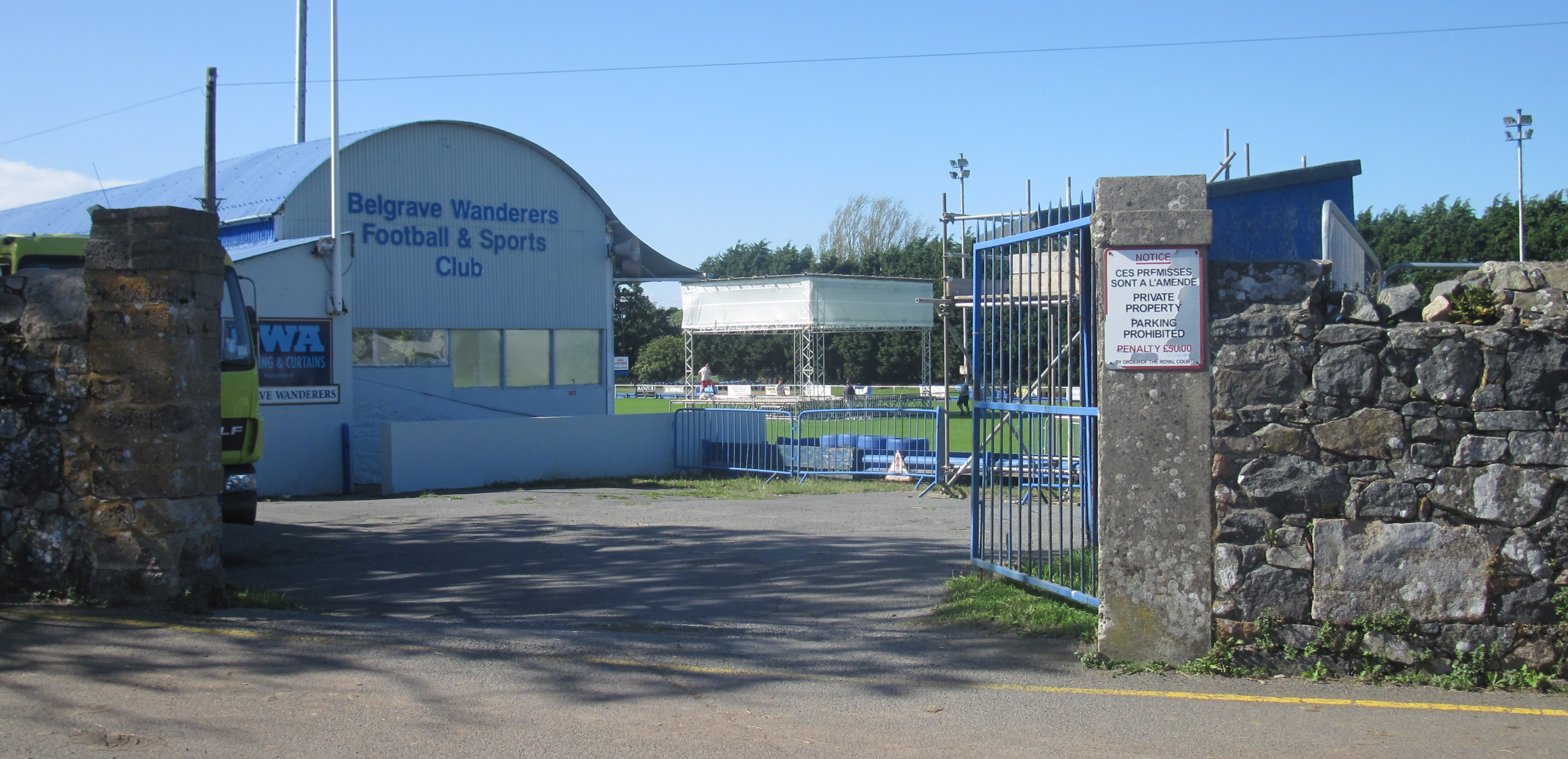
Entrance to The Track

The Track is owned by the Guernsey Amalgamated Football Committee. Belgrave Wanderers used to share The Track with Guernsey Rangers until 2007 when Guernsey Rangers sold their share in the Guernsey Amalgamated Football Committee after they moved their home games to St. Andrew's. Northerners AC also used to play their games here until 1973 when they moved to their current home at Northfield.

== Capacity ==
The Track's capacity is 3,000. Its record attendance was 12,692 in 1951 for the Muratti Final between Guernsey and Jersey.

== Usage ==
The Track was the main stadium that hosted Guernsey's Muratti tournament games until 2003, when Guernsey's Muratti games were moved to Footes Lane. Because of poor performances at Footes Lane and criticism from fans regarding the stadium's athletics track impairing views of games and affecting the atmosphere, Guernsey's Muratti games were moved back to The Track in 2009. The Track has also been used as the home ground for the Guernsey Senior County League representative side in the English FA Inter-League Cup.

In 2012, it was suggested that Guernsey F.C. would move from Footes Lane to The Track if they continued to rise through the English football league system as Footes Lane would require further development. This, however, was denied by Guernsey F.C. chairman, Steve Dewsnip.

The Track has also been used to host boxing.

A kart track circles the football pitch and karts are available for hire.

=== Famous games at the Track ===
- 12 May 1948 Guernsey v Tottenham Hotspur F.C.

== Reception ==
The Track had originally been considered as the best place to watch team sport in Guernsey, but this idea is changing in favour of Footes Lane. It has a reputation of being dusty and having an uneven surface.
