= Manor Farm Saints F.C. =

Association football club in Guernsey

Manor Farm Saints
- Full name: Manor Farm Saints Football Club

Manor Farm Saints F.C. is a football club based on the Channel Island of Guernsey. They reached the quarter-finals of the Guernsey FA Cup in 2015.
