= GFCTV =

GFCTV is an internet streaming setup within Guernsey F.C. Guernsey FC play in the fourth step of the English football pyramid in England. Guernsey F.C. is based on the island of Guernsey so the club have to pay for flights over to the mainland and for teams to come to them. As many of the matches are in England, the fans are unable to go to every match. So the communications team at Guernsey FC set up a system so they could film every match and stream it live online.

Filming matches started with live broadcasts in August 2012.

At the start of the 2013/2014 season GFCTV received satellite uplink unit to speed up the streaming.
