= Belgrave Wanderers F.C. =

Association football club in Guernsey

Coordinates: 49.4739°N 2.5412°W

Belgrave Wanderers
- Full name: Belgrave Wanderers Football Club
- Founded: 1897
- Ground: The Track, Saint Sampson
- League: Priaulx League
- 2025–26: 6th/7
- Website: Club website

Belgrave Wanderers F.C. is a football club based on the Channel Island of Guernsey. They are affiliated to the Guernsey Football Association and play in the FNB Priaulx League.

== History ==
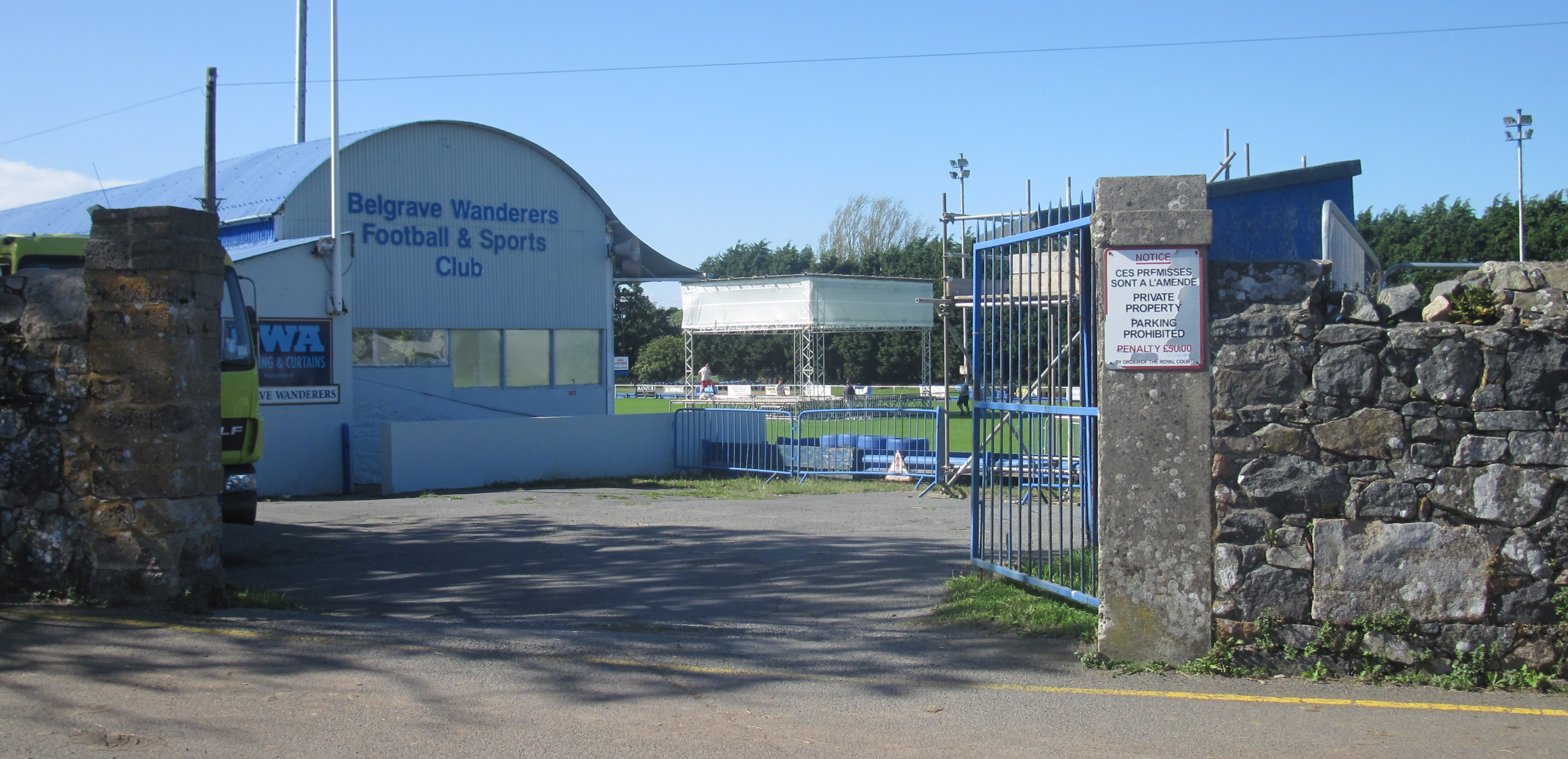
The club premises

The club first won the Priaulx League title in 1920 but it was not until the turn of the 21st century that they became a real force in the game on the island, winning the league five times between 2005 and 2014.

== Honours ==
- Priaulx League
  - Winners (8): 1919/20, 1946/47, 1959/60, 2005/06, 2007/08, 2009/10, 2012/13 & 2013/14
- Guernsey FA Cup
  - Winners (2): 2008/09 & 2012/13
- Frederick Martinez Cup
  - Winners (13): 1932/33, 1935/36 (Shared), 1946/47 (Shared), 1954/55, 1955/56, 1958/59, 1959/60 (Shared), 1963/64, 1964/65, 1969/70, 1971/72 (Shared), 2005/06, 2009/10, 2010/11 & 2013/14
- Rawlinson Cup
  - Winners (7): 1994/95, 1996/97, 2006/07, 2008/09, 2009, 2012 & 2013
- Stranger Charity Cup
  - Winners (11): 1905/06 (Shared), 1932/33, 1947/48, 1950/51, 1955/56, 1957/58, 1969/70, 1971/72, 1995/96, 2004/05 & 2007/08
- Upton Park Trophy
  - Winners (4): 1947, 1960, 2006 & 2008
