= Beeches Old Boys F.C. =

Association football club in Jersey

Beeches Old Boys
- Full name: Beeches Old Boys Football Club
- Founded: 1924
- League: Jersey Football Combination Championship
- 2013-14: 6th/9

Beeches Old Boys F.C. is a football club based on the Channel Island of Jersey. They are affiliated to the Jersey Football Association. They last played in the Jersey Football Combination Championship.

The club continued as an Over 35s team.

== Honours ==
- Jersey Football League – Champions (5): 1946–47, 1952–53. 1955–56, 1957–58, 1960–61,
- Upton Park Trophy – Winners (3): 1953, 1956, 1958
- Charity Cup – Winners (7): 1947–48, 1952–53, 1953–54, 1954–55, 1957–58, 1958–59, 1961–62
