= The Corbet Field =

Multi-use stadium in St Sampson, Guernsey

Coordinates: 49.485°N 2.546°W

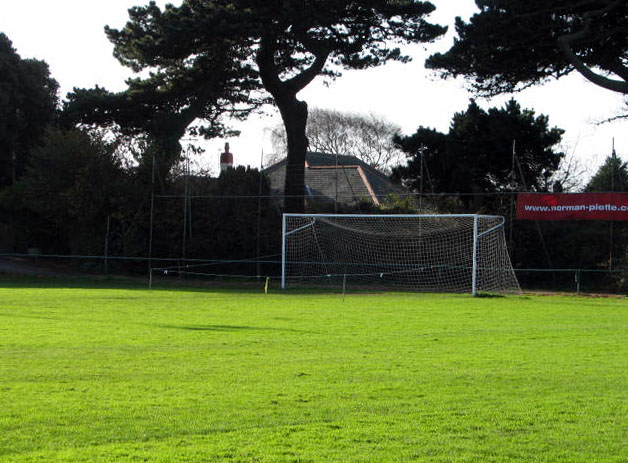
- Interactive map of The Corbet Field
- Location: Saint Sampson, Guernsey
- Owner: The Corbet Family Trust
- Operator: Vale Recreation FC
- Capacity: 3000
- Surface: Grass

Construction
- Opened: 1932

Tenants
- Vale Recreation FC, Vale Recreation Bowls Club, Guernsey F.A.

The Corbet Field is a multi-use stadium in St Sampson, Guernsey. It is currently used for football matches and Crown Green Bowling. The field is the home of Vale Recreation FC, Vale Recreation Bowls Club and serves as the home of the Guernsey national football team administration centre.

== History ==
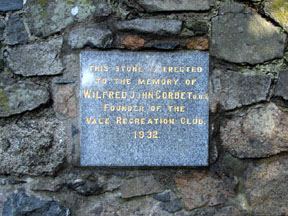

The stadium was built in 1932 by Jurat Wilfred John Corbet OBE (1893–1971) who donated the land for such use.
