= Vale Recreation F.C. =

Association football club in Guernsey

Coordinates: 49.485622°N 2.546021°W

Vale Recreation
- Full name: Vale Recreation Football Club
- Founded: 1932; 94 years ago
- Ground: Corbet Field
- Capacity: 3,000
- President: Anthony (Tony) Smith
- Chairman: David Stoddart
- Head Coach: Mark Romeril
- League: Priaulx League
- 2025–26: 5th/7
- Website: Club website
Home colours

Vale Recreation F.C. is a football club which was formed in 1932 by Wilfred J. Corbet and is based in the Channel Island of Guernsey.

The club is affiliated to the Guernsey Football Association and plays in its leagues; the club has won the top league, the FNB Priaulx League, on sixteen occasions, making them the third most successful club. In the Upton Park Trophy they have one of the worst records in the Channel Islands, losing eleven of the fifteen finals they have reached. They also compete in the Reserve Division, called the Jackson League, as well as in the Railway League (third team) and the Veterans League (over 35s).

The club is one of the few Channel Islands clubs to have competed in the FA Vase, competing in the four seasons from 1987 to 1991; in 1987–88 they got to the fourth round, the best ever by a Channel Island club until Guernsey FC reached the semi-final in 2012–13.

== Teams and FA Status ==
The club consists of a senior first team (Priaulx League) and reserve team (Jackson League), third/ fourth teams (Railway League Div 1 & Div 2), a veterans' team and junior teams for Under 18s, Under 16s, Under 14s, Under 13s and Under 12s.

Vale Recreation has achieved the Football Association's Charter Standard Development status which is awarded when a club is able to demonstrate that it meets the FA's criteria as to playing programme; child protection; sports equity and ethics and club management. Through their Standard Development status they are able provide opportunities for players from the age of five to receive coaching and competition in junior and senior men's and ladies' football. Coaching is by qualified coaches who are trained and have been screened for their suitability for working with young people.

In 2015–16 the club finished third in the Priaulx League and won the Stanger Cup 3–1 versus Rovers AC at the Corbet Field. They also reached cup semi-finals in the Wheway Cup (Jersey) losing 3–1 to Sylvans, the Jeremie Cup losing 2–1 to Trinity (Jersey) and the Le Riches Cup (Jersey) losing 2–0 to Trinity.

In 2016–17 they lost the Rawlinson Cup 3–2 to Sylvans at the Cycling Ground.

== Colours and badge ==
Vale Recreation FC's home colours are yellow shirts, green shorts and white socks. They used to play in Gold shirts, but Gold coloured shirts proved too difficult to get hold of. Their change kit is white shirts, green shorts and white socks.

The Vale Recreation FC badge has a green background with a white "VR" for the club's initials. The current sponsors of the team are Marks and Spencers.

== Stadium ==
The team plays its home games at Corbet Field, a 3,000 capacity dual-use sports facility in St Sampson, Guernsey. The ground is also used for Flat Green Bowls by Vale Recreation Bowls Club.

== Records ==
- Best FA Vase performance: Fourth round, 1987–88

== Honours ==
Honour	Titles	Years
Priaulx League Champions	16	1972–73, 1973–74, 1974–75, 1975–76, 1976–77, 1980–81, 1981–82, 1982–83, 1983–84, 1985–86, 1986–87, 1987–88, 1988–89, 1992–93, 2002–03, 2023–24
Upton Park Trophy (Channel Islands Championship) Winners	5	1974, 1976, 1981, 1988, 2024
Upton Park Trophy Runners-up	11	1973, 1975, 1977, 1982, 1983, 1984, 1986, 1987, 1989, 1993, 2003
Jeremie Cup Winners (open to Jersey and Guernsey clubs)	8	1973–74, 1974–75, 1981–82, 1982–83, 1984–85, 1987–88, 1988–89, 1993–94
Jeremie Cup Runners-up	7	1965–66, 1968–69, 1971–72, 1976–77, 1986–87, 1989–90, 1998/99
Stranger Charity Cup Winners	21	1956–57, 1965–66, 1968–69, 1972–73, 1973–74, 1974–75, 1975–76, 1976–77, 1977–78, 1978–79, 1979–80, 1980–81, 1981–82, 1982–83, 1983–84, 1984–85, 1985–86, 1998–99, 2015–16, 2022–23, 2023–24
Guernsey FA Cup	3	2016–17, 2017–18, 2023–24
Frederick Martinez Cup Winners	10	1967–68, 1972–73, 1973–74, 1981–82, 1982–83, 1983–84, 1984–85, 1985–86, 1988–89, 1993–94
Rawlinson Cup Winners	4	1995–96, 1998–99, 2000–01, 2004–05
Le Vallee Cup Winners	15	1962–63, 1970–71, 1972–73, 1974–75, 1975–76, 1976–77, 1979–80, 1980–81, 1981–82, 1982–83, 1983–84, 1986–87, 1988–89, 1989–90, 1993–94
W J Collins Memorial Cup Winners	1	2001–02
Willis Cup (Jersey) Cup Winners	1	2014–15

== Former players ==
The club has produced four players who have gone on to play professionally or semi-professionally, Matthew Le Tissier also played International football for England and Ryan-Zico Black played under 21 for Northern Ireland

- (Northern Ireland) Ryan-Zico Black
- (England) Matthew Le Tissier
- (Guernsey) Lee Luscombe
- (Guernsey) Chris Tardif
