= Sylvans S.C. =

Association football club in Guernsey

Coordinates: 49.438022°N 2.624211°W

Sylvans
- Full name: Sylvans Sports Club
- Founded: 1922
- Ground: La Route du Longfrie, St Saviour
- League: Priaulx League
- 2025-26: 4th/7
- Website: Club website

Sylvans S.C. is a football club located in the western parish of St Peter (also known as Saint Pierre du Bois) on the Channel Island of Guernsey. They are affiliated to the Guernsey Football Association and play in the FNB Priaulx League.

== History ==
The club was formed in 1922.
