= Footes Lane =

Sports stadium in Guernsey

Footes Lane Stadium
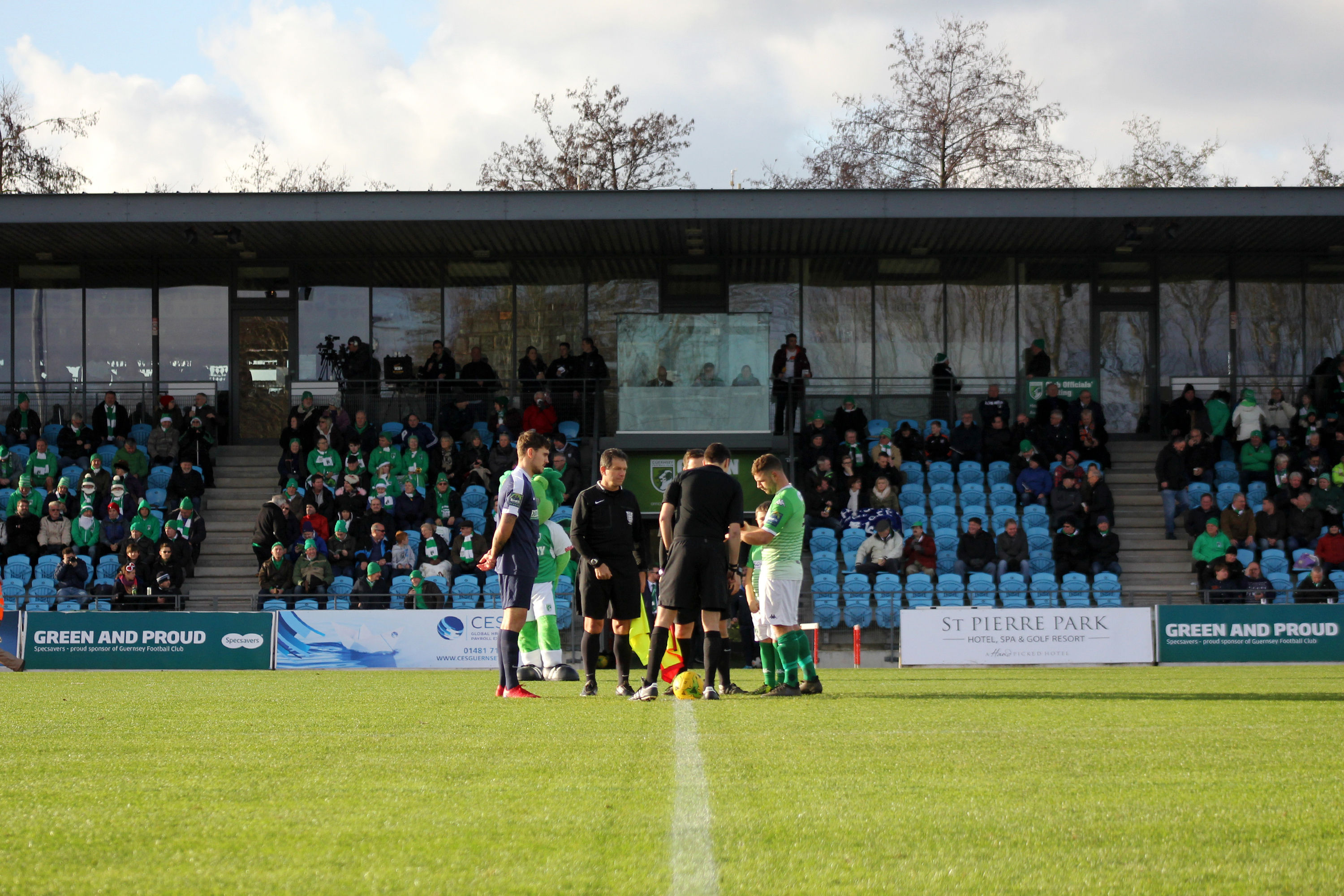
- Guernsey hosting Walton Casuals in December 2017
- Interactive map of Footes Lane Stadium
- Full name: Footes Lane Stadium
- Location: Saint Peter Port, Guernsey
- Coordinates: 49.4646°N 2.5629°W
- Capacity: 5,000 (720 seated)
- Surface: Grass
- Record attendance: 6,000 4 July 2003 (Island Games Football Final)

Tenant
- Guernsey Island Amateur Athletics Club Guernsey RFC Guernsey F.C.

Footes Lane is a multi-use sports stadium in Saint Peter Port, Guernsey and is the main sports venue on the island. It has a capacity of 5,000 with 720 seated. The stadium is the national stadium of the Bailiwick of Guernsey.

== Usage ==
The stadium is used for a number of sports and by the rugby union team, Guernsey RFC who play in National League 2 South following promotion in the 2019-20 season. The stadium also hosts Guernsey's annual Siam Cup games against Jersey Reds when the match is played in Guernsey.

The stadium also hosts association football and hosted a Hampshire Cup match in 2010 with Guernsey side Guernsey Rangers defeating Hamble 4–2. It is the home ground of Guernsey who play in the Isthmian League Division 1 South. The team's first competitive match against Knaphill F.C. ended in a 5–0 win to Guernsey. In addition, the ground from 2003 to 2009 hosted Guernsey's Muratti games before the future games were moved to The Track due to fans complaining that the presence of the athletics track between the grandstands and the pitch put the spectators too far away from the game action. It is also noted that Guernsey did not win a single Muratti while playing at Footes Lane.

The ground is also used for athletics as seen by the running track around the outside of the pitch. Footes Lane in addition hosts the annual Guernsey Marathon and was also used for the athletics events at the 2003 Island Games and 2023 Island Games.

In addition, field hockey is also played there, mainly hosting Guernsey's representative team.

== Grandstand ==
Footes Lane's grandstand was completed in time for the 2003 Island Games at a cost of £1.2 million. Within its first year of construction it won a Civic Trust award for architectural design. Additional club and function room facilities were added in 2011.
