= Guernsey Rovers A.C. =

Association football club in Guernsey

Coordinates: 49.485559°N 2.580147°W

Guernsey Rovers
- Full name: Guernsey Rovers Athletic Club
- Founded: 1931
- Ground: Port Soif, Vale
- League: Priaulx League
- 2025–26: 3rd/7
- Website: Club website

Guernsey Rovers Athletic Club is a multi-sport club based in Guernsey, at Port Soif.

Association football, cricket and archery currently take place on the 11 acres that make up their Port Soif home with 7 acres maintained for sport.

The football teams are affiliated to the Guernsey Football Association and play in all of the GFA affiliated leagues.

The cricket teams are affiliated to Guernsey Cricket, which itself is an associate member of the International Cricket Council (ICC).

Archery is undertaken on a dedicated 110-metre range with an annual international shoot taking place each September.

== Association football history ==
The club won the Priaulx League (1st team) for the first time in their history on 6 May 2017. They had won the Jackson League (2nd team) three weeks prior, resulting in them achieving a rare double in Guernsey football.
