= Chris Tardif =

English footballer (born 1979)

Personal information
- Full name: Christopher Luke Tardif
- Date of birth: 19 September 1979 (age 47)
- Place of birth: Guernsey
- Height: 6 ft 1 in (1.85 m)
- Position: Goalkeeper

Team information
- Current team: Guernsey F.C.

Youth career
- 1990–1996: Vale Recreation F.C.
- 1996–1998: Portsmouth

Senior career*
Years	Team	Apps	(Gls)
1998–2004	Portsmouth	5	(0)
1999	→ Havant & Waterlooville (loan)	8	(0)
2000	→ Newport (IOW) (loan)	0	(0)
2002–2003	→ AFC Bournemouth (loan)	9	(0)
2003–2004	→ Havant & Waterlooville (loan)	5	(0)
2004–2008	Oxford United	58	(0)
2007–2008	Basingstoke Town	14	(0)
2008	Maidenhead United	9	(0)
2008	Farnborough	0	(0)
2008–2009	Bognor Regis Town	?	(?)
2009–2010	Maidenhead United	0	(0)
2010	Basingstoke Town	10	(0)
2010	St. Martin's A.C.	0	(0)
2011–	Guernsey F.C.	169	(0)

International career
–2001	Northern Ireland U19		
2011–2015	Guernsey	12	(0)
- * Club domestic league appearances and goals as of 16:17, 14 August 2013 (UTC)

Christopher Luke Tardif (born 19 September 1979) is an English former professional footballer, who is currently the first team coach of the Guernsey Rangers Priaulx side. He has represented Northern Ireland at youth level, through a now closed loophole in the Home Nations agreement, and Guernsey at senior level.

== Career ==
Tardif began his career in Guernsey with Vale Recreation F.C. before joining Portsmouth, turning professional in the 1998 close season. He joined Havant & Waterlooville on loan in August 1999, playing in the first eight league games of Havants' first season in the Southern League Premier Division. He also had a spell on loan with Newport (Isle of Wight) from March to May 2000 and finally made his Portsmouth debut in their 2–1 defeat at home to Tranmere in the FA Cup on 6 January 2001. He made four further appearances for Portsmouth that season, all in the Championship as Portsmouth successfully avoided relegation. His only other appearance for Portsmouth came on 27 August 2001 when Tardif played in their 4–2 win at home to Grimsby Town.

He spent the 2002–03 season on loan with AFC Bournemouth, playing 14 games in all competitions and, after a spell on loan with Newport (Isle of Wight), in October 2003 joined Havant & Waterlooville on a month's loan, as cover for the injured Gareth Howells.

Released by Portsmouth, he joined Oxford United in May 2004, on a two-year contract. He was a regular the following season. However, he found first-team football hard to come by in later seasons, particularly under Jim Smith when Billy Turley kept him out of the side to the extent that he had a transfer request accepted by Oxford in December 2006. In September 2007, he retired from professional football to start a new career, although planned to continue playing semi-professionally.

Tardif played one game as a triallist for Eastleigh in October 2007, and joined Basingstoke Town in December 2007, moving to Maidenhead United in March 2008. He was an integral part of the Maidenhead side that narrowly avoided relegation at the end of the season, Tardif keeping four sheets in the final five games. He became a father shortly after the end of the season and chose to reduce the time spent travelling from his Portsmouth home by joining Farnborough in May 2008. He joined Bognor Regis Town in September 2008. He returned to Maidenhead United in the summer of 2009.

On 2 June 2010, Tardif rejoined Basingstoke Town. On 26 August 2010, Tardif had his Basingstoke Town contract terminated by mutual consent and returned to his home island, signing with St. Martins A.C.

Joining Guernsey F.C. when it was formed in 2011, Chris became Captain in 2016 following the resignation of Sam Cochrane, however in October 2016 Tardif suffered a double leg break at the home match against Godalming Town F.C. which would see him out of the team.

On February 28, 2022, Tardif was announced as the new First Team Coach for Guernsey Rangers for the next Priaulx League Season, starting August 2022. After two seasons in charge, having finished 7th and 6th in the league table, respectively, Chris left this position in June 2024.

=== International career ===
A loophole in the FIFA statutes, which has now been closed, allowed footballers who were British citizens, but born outside the UK, to play for any home nation, regardless of whether or not they have any previous connection to it. As none of the Channel Islands are affiliated to FIFA — although have county football association status within England's Football Association — and Tardif was born in Guernsey, he was therefore eligible to play for any home nation, and represented Northern Ireland at U19 level. He was called into the U21 squad in September 2001, for a European Championship qualifier against Malta, but did not play.

Since returning to Guernsey, Tardif has represented Guernsey, in the 2011 Muratti Vase Final, losing on penalties to Jersey, at the 2011 Island Games and then won the 2012 Muratti Vase Final after Guernsey beat Jersey by two goals to nil Also, in 2011 Tardiff joined the newly formed Guernsey F.C. as their goalkeeper. In 2012, he played one match as a forward for Media United in the Guernsey FA Cup to ensure his eligibility for the Muratti.
