= Guernsey F.C. =

Association football club in the Channel Islands

Guernsey
- Full name: Guernsey Football Club
- Nickname: The Green Lions
- Founded: 2011; 15 years ago
- Ground: Victoria Park
- Capacity: 3,000 (600 seated)
- Coordinates: 49°28′26″N 2°32′20″W
- Chairman: Julia Hands
- Manager: Tony Vance
- League: Southern Combination Premier Division
- 2025–26: Southern Combination Premier Division, 3rd of 20
- Website: www.guernseyfc.com
Home colours	Away colours

Guernsey Football Club is a community football club located in St. Peter Port, Guernsey, Channel Islands. The club was formed in 2011 and became a member of the Combined Counties Football League Division One for the 2011–12 season.

== History ==
=== Background ===
The FNB Priaulx League, currently operated by the Guernsey Football Association, has been the top level of football on Guernsey since 1893. In addition, a Guernsey team has competed in the annual Muratti trophy against fellow Channel Islands sides since 1905 and at the Island Games since 1991. In June 2011 the Combined Counties Football League accepted Guernsey into its Combined Counties Football League Division One. Level 10 in the English football league system. This made Guernsey the first team from the Channel Islands to compete in mainland British football, and the club funds the cost of both its own and other teams' travel to and from the island.

Guernsey-born former England international Matt Le Tissier was the club's president until his resignation in August 2014, whilst his brother Mark held the role until January 2023.

=== 2011–12 ===
Guernsey played their first game on 16 July 2011, Sky Sports came to Footes Lane to film Guernsey v Feltham 2–0 on 12 November 2011. The club beat Bedfont Sports 7–1 on 24 March 2012 to win the Combined Counties Division One at the first attempt and gain promotion.

On 30 March the club also reached the final of the Premier Cup, beating Guildford City 4–2 after extra time. They went on to beat Colliers Wood United in the final after extra time 2–0.

=== 2012–13 ===
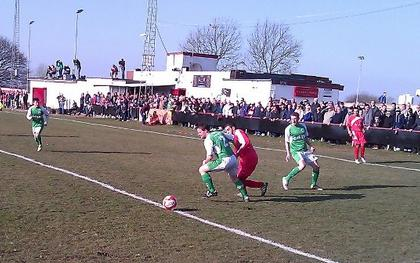
Guernsey (in green) playing Walsall Wood in the quarter-finals of the FA Vase

Guernsey started their second League campaign in August when they played Croydon with an 8–0 win in the Combined Counties Football League Premier Division after securing promotion in the previous season. They also entered the FA Vase for the first time. Sky Sports returned to Footes Lane to film the Semi final first leg against Spennymoor Town on 23 March 2013. To get the pitch playable, a novel way to dry the pitch was tried, using a helicopter, copying an idea tried in Melbourne, Australia, 50 years earlier.

With 27 games postponed in the season due to Cup matches and the terrible winter weather, Guernsey were scheduled to play 17 games in April 2013, 23 games in 43 days. the last four matches of the season in four days. League results: 2012–13 Combined Counties Football League. Finishing the season in style, Guernsey earned promotion for the second season in succession.

=== 2013–14 ===
Guernsey's entry into the FA Cup competition was confirmed, with certain conditions, including strict financial obligations, which have been alleviated with the 60Saviours campaign, whereby 60 individuals or groups pledge to support each game in the FA Cup and FA Trophy competitions.

During the FA Trophy match against Barkingside on 6 October, Ross Allen scored the 350th competitive goal since forming, in just 111 games and little more than two seasons. Advancing to the first round qualifying, Guernsey had their first FA Trophy match at home where they met Billericay Town but lost 1–2.

With promotion, Guernsey competes in the 2013–14 Isthmian League Division One South, with 46 league matches in the season, coming 4th in the league and reaching the playoffs for promotion to the Isthmian League Premier Division but losing out to Leatherhead 3–2.

=== 2014–15 ===
Playing in the 2014–15 Isthmian League Division One South for the second year. Five friendly games were played before the start of the season. GFC lost its FA Cup preliminary-round match against Worthing 2–0 but in the preliminary round of the FA Trophy won 4–0 against Barton Rovers before crashing out of the competition in the next round. In the league, the season has seen some disappointing results including a record 8–0 loss against Merstham, reaching the season's half way mark with only seven wins in 23 games. A marked improvement in the number of wins from mid December coincided with the club's 500th competitive goal on 17 January resulting in the next seven wins in just 10 games. Guernsey's 8–1 September win over Three Bridges proving to be the highest scoring match in the league during the year, Guernsey finishing the season safe, in the second quartile.

Guernsey have now played 197 matches since their formation, winning 122, drawing 28 and losing 47. They have scored 529 goals, conceding 281. The Green Lions have been victorious in 103 league games, drawing 26 and losing 39. They have scored 454 times (Matt Loaring got the 450th against Worthing) and shipped 237.

The club's head physiotherapist, Mike Thomas died on 21 May after battling with motor neurone disease.

=== 2015–16 ===
For the 2015–16 season, Guernsey is playing in the Isthmian League Division One South for the third consecutive year. Most Guernsey players participated in the 2015 Island Games where the Island team won Gold. Two friendly games being played before the season starts, winning the second which contested the newly created Mike Thomas Memorial Trophy. Guernsey has entered the FA Cup and FA Trophy competitions for the third consecutive year. Drawing their first FA Cup match 2–2 against Phoenix Sports before losing the replay 1–2. Guernsey FC exited the FA Trophy at the first hurdle, losing 2–0 against Thurrock. On 21 November, a goal was scored by Ross Allen, his 199th and the club's 500th league goal. GFC reaching the half way mark, 23 games, in a better position than last season, with 11 wins and 36 points putting them in eighth place. Ross Allen moved to the top scorer in the division by picking up his 200th and 201st goals in the next match against Dorking Wanderers. A great run up to the end of the year with a 6–2 victory over Tooting & Mitcham United, then coming from two down to get a 4–4 draw against South Park putting Guernsey in a play-off position, becoming the top goal scoring team in the division, with Ross Allen not surprisingly being the Ryman Isthmian League's top scorer after nine goals in the last four games. Guernsey's 100th home league match saw the unbeaten run increase to nine matches with a 2–1 victory over Whyteleafe F.C. This was followed with a long sequence of games lost, especially away games, resulting in Guernsey dropping to a disappointing 13th place.

The season ended with the following statistics, 246 matches have been played since the club was formed, 143 have been won and 34 drawn, 626 goals scored, 375 conceded. 63 players have represented the club, of whom 30 have scored a goal.

=== 2016–17 ===
Guernsey is playing in the Isthmian League Division One South for the fourth consecutive year with a new captain, following the resignation of Sam Cochrane who wished to stand down after five years in the post. The first FA Cup match at home, on 20 August against Thamesmead Town FC, with the FA Cup Trophy being brought to the well attended match. The result was a 2:2 draw resulting in a replay which was lost on a penalty shootout. The FA Vase match on 8 October being played away at South Park FC was equally disappointing, losing 2:0. An October match, held on the 950th anniversary of the Battle of Hastings, failed to see Guernsey repeat the success against Hastings United F.C. A tragic collision resulted in the Captain goalkeeper, Chris Tardif suffering a double leg break at the home match against Godalming Town F.C. which ruled him out of the team for the rest of the season. In December 2016 it was announced that Guernsey had formed an official link with Bristol City F.C. with regard to training and with the possibility of young Bristol City players gaining experience in away games of Guernsey F.C. Cameron Pring and Jake Andrews, on loan from Bristol F.C. played at away games during December and January, Pring boosting the defence on four occasions and Andrews scoring eight goals in eight games for Guernsey. The season progressed with three away wins, sufficient to keep Guernsey out of the relegation zone. Thomas Dodds picked up the majority of awards at the end of season event. Guernsey FC were chosen by the FA as one of eight clubs that had, for the FA Cup, "provided the competition with standout stories and moments in a memorable season.". This was in recognition of the fact that the FA Cup trophy left the mainland to attend a fixture for the first time ever in the competition's history. Former captain Sam Cochrane was nominated by the club to represent them, and was welcomed on to the pitch at Wembley, sporting the club's colours, for the singing of ‘Abide with Me’ at the FA Cup final.

== Stadium ==
The team played its home games at Footes Lane, a 5,000 capacity multi-use sports facility in St Peter Port, Guernsey. The stadium is also used as an athletics track, by the Guernsey Rugby Club and was a venue for the 2003 Island Games and 2023 Island Games.

In 2023, plans were announced for Guernsey FC to relocate from Footes Lane to a new stadium at Victoria Avenue. The new ground, named Victoria Park, opened on 29 March 2025. The £10 million facility features a 600-seat stadium and an all-weather 3G pitch. Guernsey FC played their final match at Footes Lane on 15 March 2025. 8 years in the planning, the buildings, including a clubhouse with bar and kitchen, and a changing room block, will be next to a new 3G pitch with a 400 seats stadium and terracing behind each goal. In July 2024, this was unveiled as Victoria Park with 600 seats and was scheduled to open in March 2025. The team played their final match at Footes Lane on 15 March 2025.

== Players ==
For the 2011–12 season, the team was composed of players from the seven senior teams of the Guernsey Football Association (GFA). The first player officially signed was the Guernsey national side's captain, Sam Cochrane. Following this, all twenty members of Guernsey's 2011 Island Games squad which earned a silver medal were signed. The club currently operates a squad rotation policy, allowing the players to represent their respective GFA league clubs when called upon. Channel Islander-born players are eligible to play for any of the Home Nations. Former England international footballer and then GFC President Matt Le Tissier signed up as a player for the 2012–13 season, with his first and only appearance on 24 April 2013.

=== First-team squad ===
As of 9 November 2024.

Note: Flags indicate national team as defined under FIFA eligibility rules; some limited exceptions apply. Players may hold more than one non-FIFA nationality.

No.	Pos.	Nation	Player
1	GK	ENG	Josh Addison
2	DF	ENG	Niall Hainsworth
3	DF	ENG	Jamie Dodd
4	DF	ENG	Tom Dodds
5	DF	ENG	Tom Vaudin
6	MF	ENG	Seb Vance
7	MF	ENG	Charlton Gauvain
8	MF	ENG	Matt Loaring
9	FW	ENG	Sam Murray
10	FW	ENG	Ross Allen
11	MF	ENG	Brandon Wallace
12	MF	ENG	Fin Du Port

No.	Pos.	Nation	Player
14	MF	ENG	Simon Arnold
15	DF	ENG	Ben Solway
16	MF	ENG	Alex Rihoy
17	FW	ENG	Callum Le Lacheur
18	DF	ENG	Dave Merris
19	FW	ENG	Will Fazakerley
21	DF	ENG	Jacques Cauvin
22	FW	ENG	Fin Patterson
23	MF	ENG	Frazer Maginnis
24	DF	ENG	Jacob Fallaize
25	FW	ENG	Tyrese Kelly

== Non-playing staff ==
The team is coached by Tony Vance, who also coached the Guernsey national football team until he resigned in December 2011, and is assisted by Steve Sharman. The club's head physiotherapist was Mike Thomas, who died in May 2015. He was assisted by his son Dan Thomas and the consultant club doctor is Richard Weiler.

The club chairman from establishment to August 2016 was Steve Dewsnip and club secretary was Mark Le Tissier, brother of former England international footballer Matt Le Tissier. Mark Le Tissier took over as chairman in September 2016 and held the role until January 2023. The club's patron is Sir Geoffrey Rowland, the ex-Bailiff of Guernsey.

GFC TV record and broadcast matches to subscribers over the internet. On occasions they have produced live broadcasts which have been shown in various Guernsey locations.

== Honours ==
=== League honours ===
- Isthmian League Division One South
  - Non-League Paper's National Game Awards 2013–14 Ross Allen Golden Boot Award with 54 goals
  - Pro Direct Soccer Golden Boot 2013–14 Ross Allen
  - Isthmian League Division One South 2013–14 Team Performance of the Year Award
  - Isthmian League Division One South 2013–14 Ross Allen (46) – Golden Boot Award
- Combined Counties Football League Division One
  - Champions 2011–12
  - Fair Play Trophy Winner 2011–12
  - Leading Scorer Trophy 2011–12 Ross Allen with 51 league goals
- Southern Combination Football League Premier Division
  - Playoff Finalists: 2025-26

=== Cup Honours ===
- Combined Counties Football League Premier Challenge Cup
  - Winner 2011–12

== Records ==
- Goals
  - Record league win: by 11 goals – 11–0 Crawley Down Gatwick, Isthmian League Division One South, 1 January 2014
  - Record win: by 11 goals – 11–0 Crawley Down Gatwick, Isthmian League Division One South, 1 January 2014
  - Worst league defeat: by 8 goals – 0–8 Merstham, Isthmian League Division One South, 18 November 2014, 0–8 Basingstoke, Isthmian League Division One South Central, 3 December 2022
  - Most goals in a game: 13 goals: 7–6 Shoreham FC, Southern Combination Football League Premier Division, 14 October 2025
  - Highest individual scorer in a competitive match: Ross Allen with six against Crawley Down Gatwick, Isthmian League Division One South, 1 January 2014
- Attendance
  - Highest attendance: 4,290, 1–3 v Spennymoor Town, FA Vase Semi Final first leg, 23 March 2013
  - Lowest attendance: 297, 4–3 v Sutton Common Rovers, Isthmian League Division One South Central Division, 1 January 2025
  - Seasons average highest attendance: 1,310, season 2011–12
- League consecutive winning games
  - Combined Counties Football League Division One, 11 consecutive league games won 2011–12
  - Combined Counties Football League Premier Division, 9 consecutive league games won 2012–13
  - Isthmian League Division One South, 5 consecutive league games won 2013–14, 2014–15
  - Southern Combination Football League Premier Division, 7 consecutive games won 2025-26
- Highest Position
  - FA Cup – Second round qualifying 2013–14
  - FA Trophy – First round qualifying 2013–14, 2014–15
  - FA Vase – Semi Final 2012–13
  - Combined Counties Premier Challenge Cup – Winner 2011–12
  - League – Isthmian League Division One South – level 8 of the English football pyramid – 4th 2013–14

== League results ==
Season	Level	League	Played	Won	Drawn	Lost	GF	GA	GD	Points	Final
2011–12	10	Combined Counties Football League Division One	34	31	1	2	138	22	+116	94	1st promoted
2012–13	9	Combined Counties Football League Premier Division	42	30	6	6	131	56	+75	96	2nd promoted
2013–14	8	Isthmian League Division One South	46	23	12	11	93	65	+28	81	4th playoffs
2014–15	8	Isthmian League Division One South	46	19	7	20	92	94	-2	64	10th
2015–16	8	Isthmian League Division One South	46	21	5	20	94	88	+6	68	13th
2016–17	8	Isthmian League Division One South	46	9	11	26	66	112	-46	38	21st
2017–18	8	Isthmian League Division One South	46	13	10	23	65	98	-33	49	18th
2018–19	8	Isthmian League Division One South East	36	7	9	20	50	77	-27	30	18th
2019–20	8	Isthmian League Division One South East	28	9	9	10	39	47	-8	36	Results expunged
2020–21	8	Isthmian League Division One South East	Hiatus								Results expunged
2021–22	8	Isthmian League South Central Division	36	9	9	18	60	79	19	36	14th
2022–23	8	Isthmian League South Central Division	38	10	10	18	42	73	-31	40	15th
2023–24	8	Isthmian League South Central Division	40	9	7	26	68	97	-29	34	18th
2024–25	8	Isthmian League South Central Division	42	11	9	22	61	95	-34	42	19th Relegated
2025-26	9	Southern Combination Football League	38	27	0	11	126	77	+49	81	4th Playoff Finalist

== Cup performance timeline ==
Tournament	2011–12	2012–13	2013–14	2014–15	2015–16	2016–17	2025-26
FA Cup	A	A	2QR	PR	PR	PR	EPR
FA Trophy	A	A	1QR	1QR	PR	PR	A
FA Vase	A	SF	A	A	A	A	3R
Combined Counties Premier Challenge Cup	W	3R	A	A	A	A	A
Combined Counties Division 1 Challenge Cup	QF	A	A	A	A	A	A

(A Absent, PR Preliminary round, QR Qualifying round, 3R 3rd round, QF Quarter Final, SF Semi Final, F Finalist, W Winner)

== Players who have turned professional ==
- Rhys Jordan – 2012 – Bristol City
- James Hamon – 2014 – Exeter City
- Alex Scott – 2019 – AFC Bournemouth and England
- Jack Griffin – 2024 – Bristol City

== See also ==
- Guernsey official football team
