= Saint Sampson, Guernsey =

Parish in northeastern Guernsey

Coordinates: 49°28′55″N 2°32′28″W

Saint Sampson
- Parish
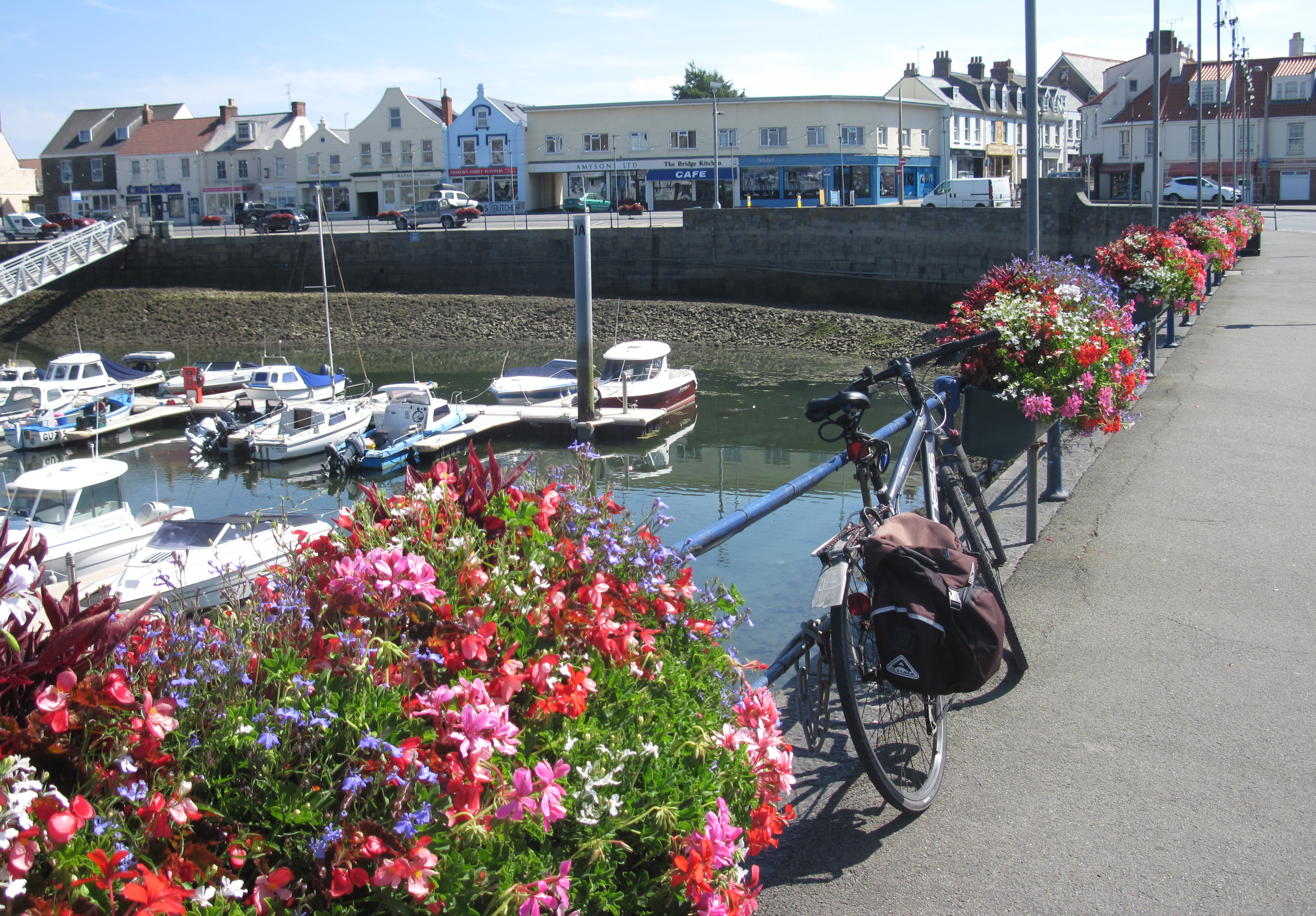

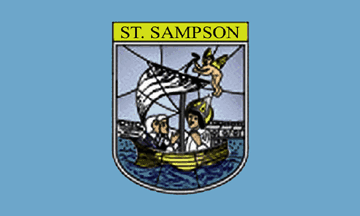
- Flag

- Location of Saint Sampson in Guernsey
- Crown Dependency: Guernsey, Channel Islands

Government
  - Electoral district: St Sampson

Area
  - Total: 6.0 km^{2} (2.3 sq mi)

Population (2019)
  - Total: 8,966
  - Density: 1,500/km^{2} (3,900/sq mi)
- Time zone: GMT
  - Summer (DST): UTC+01
- Postal code: GY2

St Sampson (Guernésiais: Saint Samsaon) is a parish of Guernsey, an island in the Bailiwick of Guernsey, directly north of St Peter Port. It is on the north-west and north-east coasts of the island and is split into two sections, intersected by Vale.

The parish has a population of 8,966. Its residents are known as roînes (the Guernésiais for frogs).

What is currently the northern boundary of the parish originally ran along the south coast of Le Braye du Valle, a tidal channel that made the northern extremity of Guernsey, Le Clos du Valle, a tidal island. La Braye du Valle was drained and reclaimed in 1806 by the British Government as a defence measure. The eastern end of the former channel became the town and harbour (from 1820) of St. Sampson's, now the second biggest port in Guernsey. The western end of La Braye is now Le Grand Havre. The roadway called The Bridge across the end of the harbour at St. Sampson's recalls the bridge that formerly linked the two parts of Guernsey at high tide.

== Historical facts ==
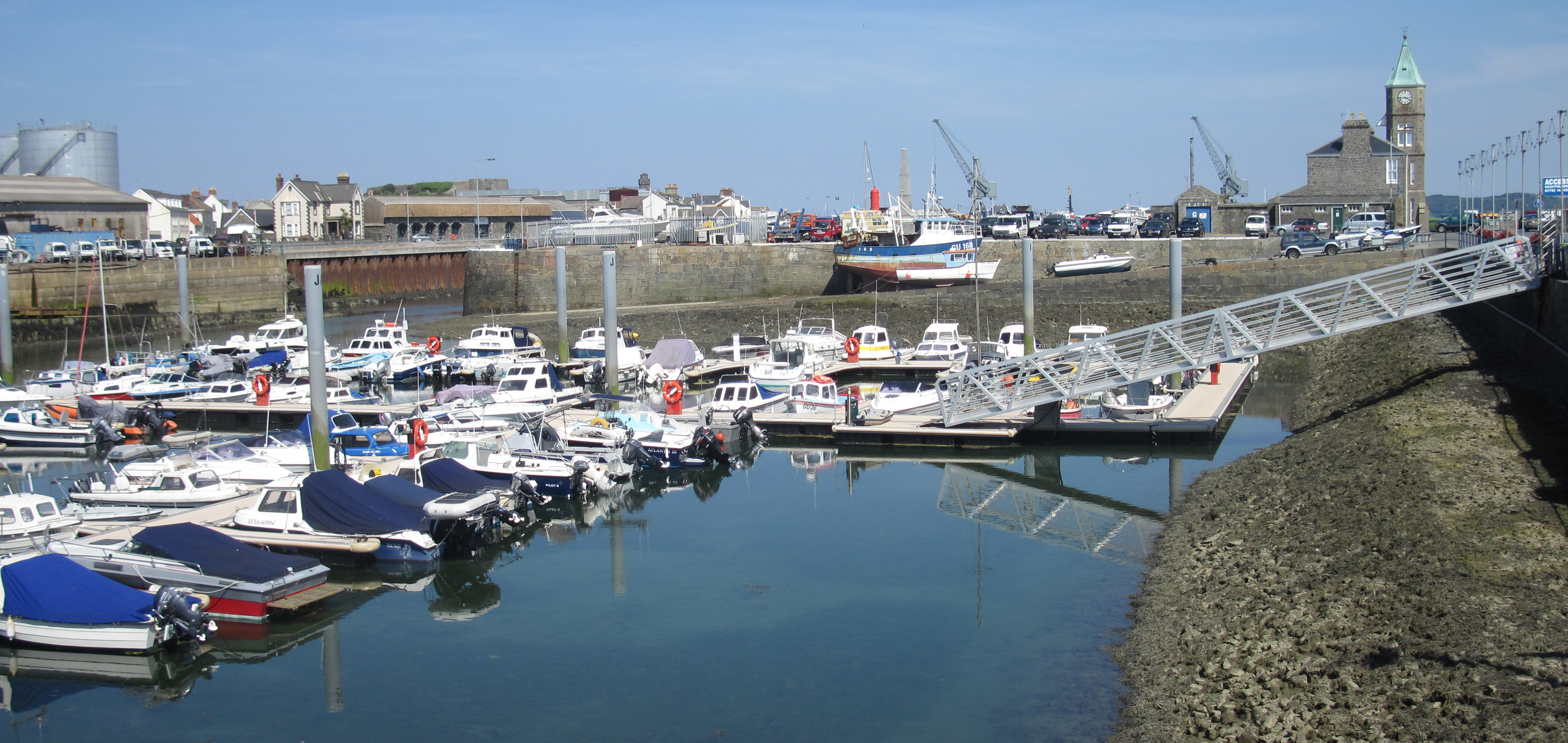
St Sampson Harbour

The parish church of St. Sampson claims to be the oldest of Guernsey's parish churches, standing on the coast where Samson of Dol arrived from Brittany in the sixth century, intending to convert Islanders to Christianity. The church was consecrated on 22 May 1111 by Antony Susar the Bishop of Coutances. The ceremony was witnessed by notable figures of the time including Julien De Prade, the governor of the island, Richard D'Anneville, son of Sampson D'Anneville, and other dignitaries.

St Sampson is the Patron Saint of Guernsey.

In 1814 there were 125 dwellings, housing 788 residents of Saint Sampson. The parish providing 1/13th of all taxes collected in Guernsey.

Harbour facilities improved as trade using the harbour increased. In 1822, 7,000 tons of granite cobbles were exported in 90 ships. By 1836 annual exports had increased to 57,584 tons. In 1841 the south quay was completed and by 1851, 542 ships were using the harbour each year. By 1861 granite exports had risen to 142,866 tons on 737 ships. Today the harbour is used for non-containerised freight, including liquid and gas fuel.

Shipbuilding took place in Saint Sampson, from local trading craft to a tea clipper called Golden Spur and a steamship, the Commerce built in 1874. The Lydia, a local 173 ton brig, sailed in March 1853 from Saint Sampson to Adelaide with 60 emigrants, it took 132 days.

Trams used to run from Saint Sampson to Saint Peter Port from 1879, taking over from a horse-drawn bus that had started operation in 1837. Originally the trams were steam powered, changing to electric in 1891 and continuing in service until 1934.

== Features ==
The features of the parish include:

- Churches:
  - St Sampson's Parish Church
  - The Rock Community Church
  - Our Lady Star of the Sea
  - Delancey Elim Church
  - Les Capelles Methodist Church
  - Kingdom Hall of Jehovah's Witnesses
- Saint Sampson Harbour (southern half)
- Delancey Park
- Longue Hougue quarry, in use until 1969 and now a water reservoir
- Military:
  - Parish war memorial inside the parish church
  - Chateau des Marais, a Motte-and-bailey castle
  - Guernsey loophole towers- Mont Crevelt Tower
  - German fortifications, built during the occupation 1940-45
- Archaeology:
  - A ruined megalith at Delancey park
  - A cist in circles at Sandy Hook, L'Islet
- Bays
  - Grande Havre
  - Port Grat
  - Pulias
  - Pecqueries
- A number of protected buildings

The parish of St. Sampson hosts:

- The St. Sampson Douzaine
- The island prison
- The Track
- The island's skate park
- Giving Opportunities (GO Charity)
- The Guernsey studio of Channel Television and BBC Radio Guernsey
- Numerous industrial premises and a fuel farm
- Corbet Field – home of Vale Recreation F.C.
- Hautes Capelles Primary School
- St Mary & St Michael Catholic Primary School
- St. Sampson High School
- Le Murier special needs secondary school
- Oatlands Craft Centre
- White Rock Brewery

== Politics ==
Prior to the States decision to introduce Island Wide Voting St Sampson comprised the whole of the St Sampson administrative division

In the 2016 Guernsey general election there was a 3,509 or 78% turnout to elect six deputies. Those elected (in order of votes received) being Lyndon Trott, Paul Le Pelley, Jennifer Merrett, Gavin St Pier, Jane Stephens and Carl Meerveld.

== In literature ==
Toilers of the Sea (1866) by French author Victor Hugo is set in the Saint Sampson surroundings.
