= St. Martins A.C. =

Association football club in Guernsey

Coordinates: 49.437185°N 2.551235°W

St. Martins
- Full name: St. Martins Athletic Club
- Nickname: Saints
- Founded: 1894
- Ground: Blanche Pierre Lane
- League: Priaulx League
- 2025-26: 2nd of 7
- Website: Club website
Home colours

St. Martins A.C. is a football club based on the Channel Island of Guernsey. They are affiliated to the Guernsey Football Association and play in the FNB Priaulx League.

The club is one of the few Channel Islands clubs to have competed in the FA Vase, competing in the four seasons from 1978 to 1981.

== Records ==
- Best FA Vase performance: Third round, 1978–79 (replay)
