= Guernsey Football Association =

- Founded: 1893; 132 years ago
- Headquarters: The Corbet Field
- President: Chris Schofield (title is Chairman)
- Website: www.guernseyfa.com

The Guernsey Football Association, also simply known as the Guernsey FA or the GFA, is the body that co-ordinates and organises the sport of football in Guernsey. Although, as a Crown Dependency, Guernsey is not a part of the United Kingdom, the local FA is affiliated with the English FA, and acts as a county football association.

== Organisation ==
The organisation runs the Guernsey national football team (which competes in the Muratti Vase and the Island Games), the Guernsey league representative XI (which competes in the FA National League System Cup) and the Priaulx League, the main league competition on the island.

The representative XI won the National League Cup in 2010 and qualified for the UEFA Regions Cup, where they were eliminated in the group stages in Macedonia. Following this run, the GFA proposed to establish a club which would join the English Football Pyramid in an attempt to offer the island's senior elite players the opportunity to progress further and test themselves at a higher level. In 2011 Guernsey F.C. was created.

The Guernsey FA is based at The Corbet Field (home of Member Club Vale Recreation F.C.), in Saint Sampson, Guernsey.

Chris Schofield was appointed Chairman in 2010 and replaced Mark Le Tissier who left to set up Guernsey F.C.

In March 2012, former Oxford United FC trainee, Angus Mackay, was appointed as the football development officer.

== Competitions ==
=== Leagues ===
- Priaulx League
- Division 1 (formerly Jackson League)
- Division 2 (formerly Railway League 1)
- Division 3 (formerly Railway League 2)
- Under 18 Development League
- Under 16 Development League
- Under 14 Development League
- Under 13 Development League
- Women's League
- Veterans League

=== Cups ===
- Guernsey FA Cup
- Stranger Charity Cup (Priaulx League teams and U18's)
- Mauger Cup (Jackson League teams)
- Rouget Cup (Railway League teams)
- Old Vic Cup (Under 18 Development League)
- Loveridge Cup (Under 18 Development League)
- Normandie Cup (Under 16 Development League teams)
- Duquemin Cup (Under 16 Development League teams)
- MJ Le Prevost Cup (Under 14 Development League teams)
- Le Vallee Cup (under 14's)
- Corbet Cup (under 12's)
- Women's Knock-out Cup
- Women's Secondary Cup
- Frederick Martinez Cup (for top two Priaulx League sides from the previous season)
- Rawlinson Cup (Priaulx league pre-season competition)

== Presidents of the Guernsey Football Association ==
| Name | Périod |
|---|---|
| (Guernsey) Alec Le Noury | 1984 - 2004 |
| (Guernsey) Dave Dorey | 2004 - 2005 |
| (Guernsey) Dave Nussbaumer | 2005 - 2008 |
| (Guernsey) Mark Le Tissier | 2008 - 2011 |
| (Guernsey) Chris Schofield | 2011 - |

== Football stadiums in Guernsey ==
| Stadium | Capacity | City |
|---|---|---|
| Footes Lane | 5,000 | Saint Peter Port |

In July 2023 it was announced that a new headquarters would be built at Victoria Avenue, St Peter Port, adjacent to The Track. 8 years in the planning, the buildings, including a clubhouse with bar and kitchen, and a changing room block, will be next to a new 3G pitch with a 400 seats stadium and terracing behind each goal. The £10m funding has come from grants and private donations. Guernsey FC will make the new stadium its home when it opens in 2025.

== See also ==
- Guernsey national football team
