= Guernsey Rangers F.A.C. =

Association football club in Guernsey

Coordinates: 49.449163°N 2.565621°W

Guernsey Rangers
- Full name: Guernsey Rangers Football Athletic Club
- Founded: 1893
- Ground: Route de Saint Andrew, St Andrew
- League: Priaulx League
- 2025-26: 7th/7
- Website: Club website

Guernsey Rangers F.A.C is a football club formed in 1893 and based in Guernsey, Channel Islands. They currently play in the FNB Priaulx League. Guernsey Rangers are the oldest club in the Channel Islands and are a founder member of the Guernsey Football Association.

The club traditionally plays in red and black and the club currently plays its home games at St Andrew, Guernsey. At the start of the 2017–18 league season they will be playing their home games on the 3G Astro pitch at KG5.

Guernsey Rangers are recognised as an FA Chartered Standard Club – this is a club standard that has to be passed by The Football Association.

On 6 April 2010, Guernsey Rangers won the Guernsey FA Cup for the first time, beating Belgrave Wanderers 2–1. The second occasion they won the cup was in the 2013–14 season.
