= Priaulx League =

Football league in Guernsey, UK

- Founded: 1893; 133 years ago
- Country: Guernsey
- Divisions: 1
- Number of clubs: 7
- Current champions: Northerners (2025–26)
- Most championships: Northerners (33 titles)
- Website: Results website
- Current: 2024-25 Priaulx League

The Priaulx League /ˈpriː.oʊ/ is the senior football league on the island of Guernsey, and is run by the Guernsey Football League Management LBG, (prior to 2016 the Guernsey Football Association). Although the league is affiliated with the English FA, it does not form a part of the English football league system. The winners of the Priaulx League go on to play the champions of the Jersey Combination for the Upton Park Trophy.

== History ==
The competition was first held in 1893; it is named in honour of O. Priaulx of Bury St. Edmunds, who donated £5 to purchase a trophy.

There are two other league competitions on the island (the Jackson League and Veterans League), but there is no promotion or relegation into or from these leagues.

In 2010 the league representative side (then called then Guernsey County League) defeated the Liverpool County Premier League 5–2 in the final of the FA National League System Cup and went on to represent England in the UEFA Regions Cup, being eliminated in the group stage in Macedonia.

== Teams ==
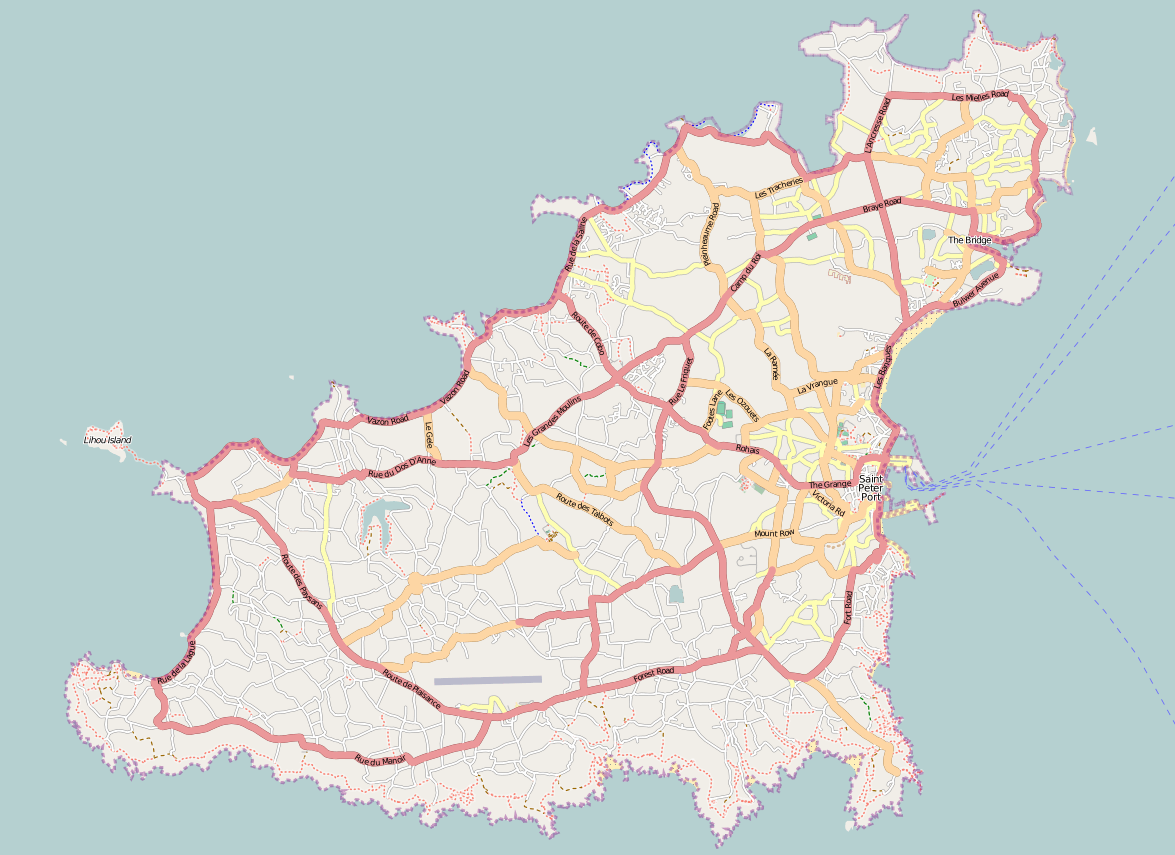
Location of the clubs in the 2025–26 Priaulx League

The league lined up with the following teams for the 2025–26 season.

- Belgrave Wanderers
- Guernsey Rangers
- Guernsey Rovers
- Northerners
- St. Martins AC
- Sylvans
- Vale Recreation

== Winners ==
Past winners of the league are:

Season-	
1893-94	Band Company, 2nd Batt. Royal Fusilliers
1894-95	G & H Company Royal Fusilliers
1895-96	10 Company, W Division, R.A.
1896-97	2nd Batt. P.A. Somerset L.I.
1897-98	2nd Batt. Wilts.
1898-99	2nd Batt. Wilts.
1899-1900	Northerners
1900-01	Northerners
1901-02	Grange
1902-03	Northerners
1903-04	2nd Batt. Leicesters
1904-05	2nd Batt. Manchesters
1905-06	2nd Batt. Manchesters
1906-07	2nd Batt. Manchesters
1907-08	Northerners
1908-09	2nd Middlesex Regiment
1909-10	Northerners
1910-11	2nd Batt. Royal Irish Regiment
1911-12	2nd Batt. Royal Irish Regiment
1912-13	Northerners
1913-14	Yorkshire Regiment
1914-19	No football due to World War I
1919-20	Belgrave Wanderers
1920-21	Northerners
1921-22	Northerners
1922-23	Athletics
1923-24	Northerners
1924-25	Guernsey Rangers

Season	
1925-26	Northerners
1926-27	Northerners
1927-28	Northerners
1928-29	Northerners
1929-30	Northerners
1930-31	Guernsey Rangers
1931-32	Northerners
1932-33	Northerners
1933-34	Guernsey Rangers
1934-35	Guernsey Rangers
1935-36	Northerners
1936-37	Northerners
1937-38	Guernsey Rangers
1938-39	Guernsey Rangers
1939-46	No football due to World War II
1946-47	Belgrave Wanderers
1947-48	Northerners
1948-49	Guernsey Rangers
1949-50	Guernsey Rangers
1950-51	Guernsey Rangers
1951-52	Guernsey Rangers
1952-53	Northerners
1953-54	Guernsey Rangers
1954-55	Guernsey Rangers
1955-56	Guernsey Rangers
1956-57	Northerners
1957-58	Guernsey Rangers
1958-59	Guernsey Rangers
1959-60	Belgrave Wanderers

Season	
1960-61	Northerners
1961-62	Northerners
1962-63	Northerners
1963-64	St. Martins
1964-65	St. Martins
1965-66	St. Martins
1966-67	St. Martins
1967-68	St. Martins
1968-69	St. Martins
1969-70	St. Martins
1970-71	St. Martins
1971-72	St. Martins
1972-73	Vale Recreation
1973-74	Vale Recreation
1974-75	Vale Recreation
1975-76	Vale Recreation
1976-77	Vale Recreation
1977-78	Guernsey Rangers
1978-79	St. Martins
1979-80	Guernsey Rangers
1980-81	Vale Recreation
1981-82	Vale Recreation
1982-83	Vale Recreation
1983-84	Vale Recreation
1984-85	St. Martins
1985-86	Vale Recreation
1986-87	Vale Recreation
1987-88	Vale Recreation
1988-89	Vale Recreation
1989-90	Northerners

Season	
1990-91	Northerners
1991-92	Northerners
1992-93	Vale Recreation
1993-94	Sylvans
1994-95	Sylvans
1995-96	Sylvans
1996-97	Sylvans
1997-98	Sylvans
1998-99	Sylvans
1999-2000	Sylvans
2000-01	Sylvans
2001-02	Sylvans
2002-03	Vale Recreation
2003-04	St. Martins
2004-05	Sylvans
2005-06	Belgrave Wanderers
2006-07	Northerners
2007-08	Belgrave Wanderers
2008-09	Northerners
2009-10	Belgrave Wanderers
2010-11	St. Martins
2011-12	Northerners
2012-13	Belgrave Wanderers
2013-14	Belgrave Wanderers
2014-15	Northerners
2015-16	Northerners
2016-17	Guernsey Rovers
2017-18	Guernsey Rovers
2018-19	St. Martins
2019-20	Null and Void
2020-21	St. Martins
2021-22	St. Martins
2022-23	Guernsey Rovers
2023-24	Vale Recreation
2024-25	St. Martins
2025-26	Northerners

=== Winners Tally ===
Up to and including 2025-26 Season:

Team	Winners Tally
Northerners	33
Guernsey Rangers	17
St. Martins	17
Vale Recreation	16
Sylvans	10
Belgrave Wanderers	8
Guernsey Rovers	3
2nd Batt. Manchesters	3
2nd Batt. Royal Irish Regiment	2
2nd Batt. Wilts.	2
10 Company, W Division, R.A.	1
2nd Batt. Leicesters	1
2nd Batt. P.A. Somerset L.I.	1
2nd Middlesex Regiment	1
Athletics	1
Band Company, 2nd Batt. Royal Fusilliers	1
G & H Company Royal Fusilliers	1
Grange	1
Yorkshire Regiment	1
