= County football association =

Local governing bodies of association football in England and the Crown dependencies

The county football associations are the local governing bodies of association football in England and the Crown dependencies. County FAs exist to govern all aspects of football in England. They are responsible for administering club and player registration as well as promoting development amongst those bodies and referees.

There are currently 50 county FAs. Most county FAs align roughly along historic county boundaries, although some cover more than one county, and some of the major cities, particularly those with a strong football tradition, have their own FAs. The Sheffield FA was the first to be created, in 1867. Additionally, the three branches of the British Armed Forces, as well as the Amateur Football Alliance, which has a strong presence in the south-east of England, are listed as having their own County FAs not corresponding to geography.

County football associations host 'county cups' – knockout cup competitions held at a sub-regional level, which are open to affiliated members of the county FA. Typically, county FAs will host cup competitions at the following levels: senior, intermediate, junior, women's, veterans, senior Sunday football, intermediate Sunday football and junior Sunday football.

== List of county FAs ==
Association	Area	Founded	Main county cup
Amateur Football Alliance	No	1907	AFA Senior Cup
Army	No	1888	Army FA Challenge Cup
Bedfordshire	Bedfordshire	1894	Bedfordshire Senior Cup
Berks & Bucks	Berkshire; Buckinghamshire	1878	Berks & Bucks Senior Cup
Birmingham	Black Country (within 30 miles of Stevenson Place, Birmingham); Warwickshire	1875	Birmingham Senior Cup
Cambridgeshire	Cambridgeshire	1884	Cambridgeshire Invitation Cup
Cheshire	Cheshire	1878	Cheshire Senior Cup
Cornwall	Cornwall	1889	Cornwall Senior Cup
Cumberland	Cumberland	1885	Cumberland Senior Cup
Derbyshire	Derbyshire	1883	Derbyshire Senior Cup
Devon	Devon	1887	Devon St Lukes Cup
Dorset	Dorset	1887	Dorset Senior Cup
Durham	County Durham	1883	Durham Challenge Cup
Essex	Essex	1882	Essex Senior Cup
Gloucestershire	Gloucestershire	1886	Gloucestershire Senior Cup
Guernsey	Guernsey	1893	Guernsey FA Cup
Hampshire	Hampshire	1887	Hampshire Senior Cup
Herefordshire	Herefordshire	1893	Herefordshire Senior Cup
Hertfordshire	Hertfordshire	1885	Herts Senior Cup
Huntingdonshire	Huntingdonshire	1894	Huntingdonshire Senior Cup
Isle of Man	Isle of Man	1890	Isle of Man FA Cup
Jersey	Jersey	1905	Le Riche Cup
Kent	Kent	1881	Kent Senior Cup
Lancashire	Lancashire	1878	Lancashire Senior Cup
Leicestershire & Rutland	Leicestershire; Rutland	1887	Leicestershire and Rutland Senior Cup
Lincolnshire	Lincolnshire	1881	Lincolnshire Senior Cup
Liverpool	Merseyside; 18 mile radius / 8 miles on the Wirral from Liverpool Town Hall	1882	Liverpool Senior Cup
London	Greater London (within 12 miles of Charing Cross)	1882	London Senior Cup
Manchester	Greater Manchester (within 12 miles of Manchester Town Hall in historic Lancashire)	1884	Manchester Senior Cup
Middlesex	Middlesex	1883	Middlesex Senior Cup
Norfolk	Norfolk	1881	Norfolk Senior Cup
Northamptonshire	Northamptonshire	1887	Northamptonshire Senior Cup
Northumberland	Northumberland	1882	Northumberland Senior Cup
Nottinghamshire	Nottinghamshire	1882	Nottinghamshire Senior Cup
Oxfordshire	Oxfordshire	1884	Oxfordshire Senior Cup
Royal Air Force	No	1920	RAF Challenge Cup
Royal Navy	No	1904	Royal Navy Cup
Shropshire	Shropshire	1877	Shropshire Senior Cup
Somerset	Somerset	1885	Somerset Premier Cup
Staffordshire	Staffordshire	1877	Staffordshire Senior Cup
Suffolk	Suffolk	1885	Suffolk Senior Cup
Surrey	Surrey	1882	Surrey Senior Cup
Sussex	Sussex	1882	Sussex Senior Challenge Cup
Westmorland	Westmorland	1897	Westmorland Senior Challenge Cup
Wiltshire	Wiltshire	1884	Wiltshire County FA Senior Cup
Worcestershire	Worcestershire	1893	Worcestershire Senior Cup
East Riding	East Riding of Yorkshire	1902	East Riding Senior Cup
North Riding	North Riding of Yorkshire	1881	North Riding Senior Cup
Sheffield and Hallamshire	20 mile radius from Sheffield Cathedral	1867	Sheffield and Hallamshire Senior Cup
West Riding	West Riding of Yorkshire (except within 20 miles of Sheffield Cathedral)	1896	West Riding County Cup

== Other FAs with equivalent status ==
There are an additional five recognised bodies that have representation on the FA Council on the same level as County FAs.

Association	Founded
Cambridge University	1856
English Schools	1904
Independent Schools	1960s
Oxford University	1872
Women's Football Conference	1983

== See also ==
- English football league system
- The Football Association
- The FA Council
