= Julie Hemsley =

England women's international footballer

Personal information
- Place of birth: Whitehawk, England

Senior career*
Years	Team	Apps	(Gls)
1973	Brighton & Hove Albion		
- Surahammar IFK

International career
1982	England	1	(0)

Managerial career
- 1999–2000: New Hampshire Lady Phantoms
- * Club domestic league appearances and goals

Julie Hemsley is a former England women's international footballer who played for Brighton & Hove Albion. Hemsley become the first female to be a member of the FA Council.

In 1999 and 2000 Hemsley coached New Hampshire Lady Phantoms of the USL W-League. English Goalkeeper Layla Young was named team MVP in 1999. In 2000 Hemlsey recruited several other English players to the American club.

== International career ==
In November 2022, Hemsley was recognized by The Football Association as one of the England national team's legacy players, and as the 58th women's player to be capped by England.
