= 2010 FA Cup final =

English football match

- The match programme cover
- Event: 2009–10 FA Cup
Chelsea	Portsmouth
1	0
- Date: 15 May 2010
- Venue: Wembley Stadium, London
- Man of the Match: Didier Drogba (Chelsea)
- Referee: Chris Foy (Merseyside)
- Attendance: 88,335

The 2010 FA Cup final was the 129th final of the FA Cup, the world's oldest domestic football cup competition. The match took place on 15 May 2010, at Wembley Stadium, London, in front of a crowd of over 88,000 and a British television audience of over 5 million. The match was contested between the two most recent FA Cup winners, Chelsea (2009, also cup holders) and Portsmouth (2008), and was refereed by Chris Foy from Merseyside. Chelsea won 1–0.

Chelsea entered the final looking to complete the Double for the first time in their history, having been crowned as the winners of the 2009–10 Premier League the week before. Portsmouth entered the final in a markedly different position; they faced an uncertain future, having already been relegated from the Premier League on 10 April following financial troubles, which saw them become the first ever Premier League club to enter administration, incurring an automatic nine-point deduction.

After Kevin-Prince Boateng saw his penalty saved by Petr Čech in the 54th minute, Didier Drogba scored from a free kick in the 58th minute to lead Chelsea to a 1–0 victory, and their first Double despite a later penalty miss from Frank Lampard. Chelsea's Ashley Cole won the FA Cup for a record 6th time. It was the first final in which both teams missed a penalty. Frank Lampard's penalty miss was the first penalty to completely miss the target in an FA Cup Final since Charlie Wallace in 1913; Wallace's team also won 1–0. David James was the oldest goalkeeper to play in an FA Cup final, aged nearly 40.

The UEFA Europa League qualifying place normally given to the winners of the FA Cup became irrelevant for the 2010 final, after Chelsea qualified for the Champions League and Portsmouth were refused a UEFA licence due to their financial situation. With Manchester United having won the League Cup and qualified for the Champions League, the qualifying place due to the finalists instead passed to Liverpool, the seventh-placed Premier League team.

== Background ==
Up to the 2010 final, Chelsea had reached the FA Cup Final nine times, winning five of them, while Portsmouth had won two of their four finals. Portsmouth were the latest side to reach the final of the FA Cup in the same season as being relegated from Premier League; the last team to do the same was Middlesbrough in 1997 who, coincidentally, were also beaten by Chelsea.

Chelsea won both of the games between the two sides in the 2009–10 Premier League, winning 2–1 at Stamford Bridge and 5–0 at Fratton Park. Chelsea and Portsmouth had been drawn together in the FA Cup twice before, each winning one tie; their first FA Cup encounter came in the Fifth Round in 1928–29, when Portsmouth won 1–0 in a replay at Fratton Park after they had drawn 1–1 at Stamford Bridge; Portsmouth went on to reach the final. Their next meeting was 68 years later, in the Sixth Round of the 1996–97 competition; Chelsea won the match 4–1 and went on to win the trophy.

Because Chelsea won the 2009–10 Premier League, and Portsmouth's appeal for a UEFA licence was rejected by the FA, their 2010–11 UEFA Europa League berth went to the team that finished in seventh place in the league, Liverpool.

== Route to the final ==
Chelsea		Round	Portsmouth	
Watford [C] H 5–0	Sturridge 5', 68', Eustace 15' (o.g.), Malouda 22', Lampard 64'	Third Round	Coventry City [C] H 1–1	Boateng 45+1'
Watford [C] H 5–0	Sturridge 5', 68', Eustace 15' (o.g.), Malouda 22', Lampard 64'	replay	Coventry City [C] A 2–1	Wright 90' (o.g.), Mokoena 120+1'
Preston North End [C] A 2–0	Anelka 37', Sturridge 47'	Fourth Round	Sunderland [PL] H 2–1	Utaka 42', 57'
Cardiff City [C] H 4–1	Drogba 2', Ballack 51', Sturridge 69', Kalou 86'	Fifth Round	Southampton [L1] A 4–1	Owusu-Abeyie 66', Dindane 75', Belhadj 82', O'Hara 85'
Stoke City [PL] H 2–0	Lampard 35', Terry 67'	Sixth Round	Birmingham City [PL] H 2–0	Piquionne 67', 70'
Aston Villa [PL] Wembley Stadium, London; 3–0	Drogba 68', Malouda 89', Lampard 90+5'	Semi-finals	Tottenham Hotspur [PL] Wembley Stadium, London; 2–0 (aet)	Piquionne 99', Boateng 117'

[PL] = Premier League, [C] = Championship, [L1] = League One

== Pre-match ==
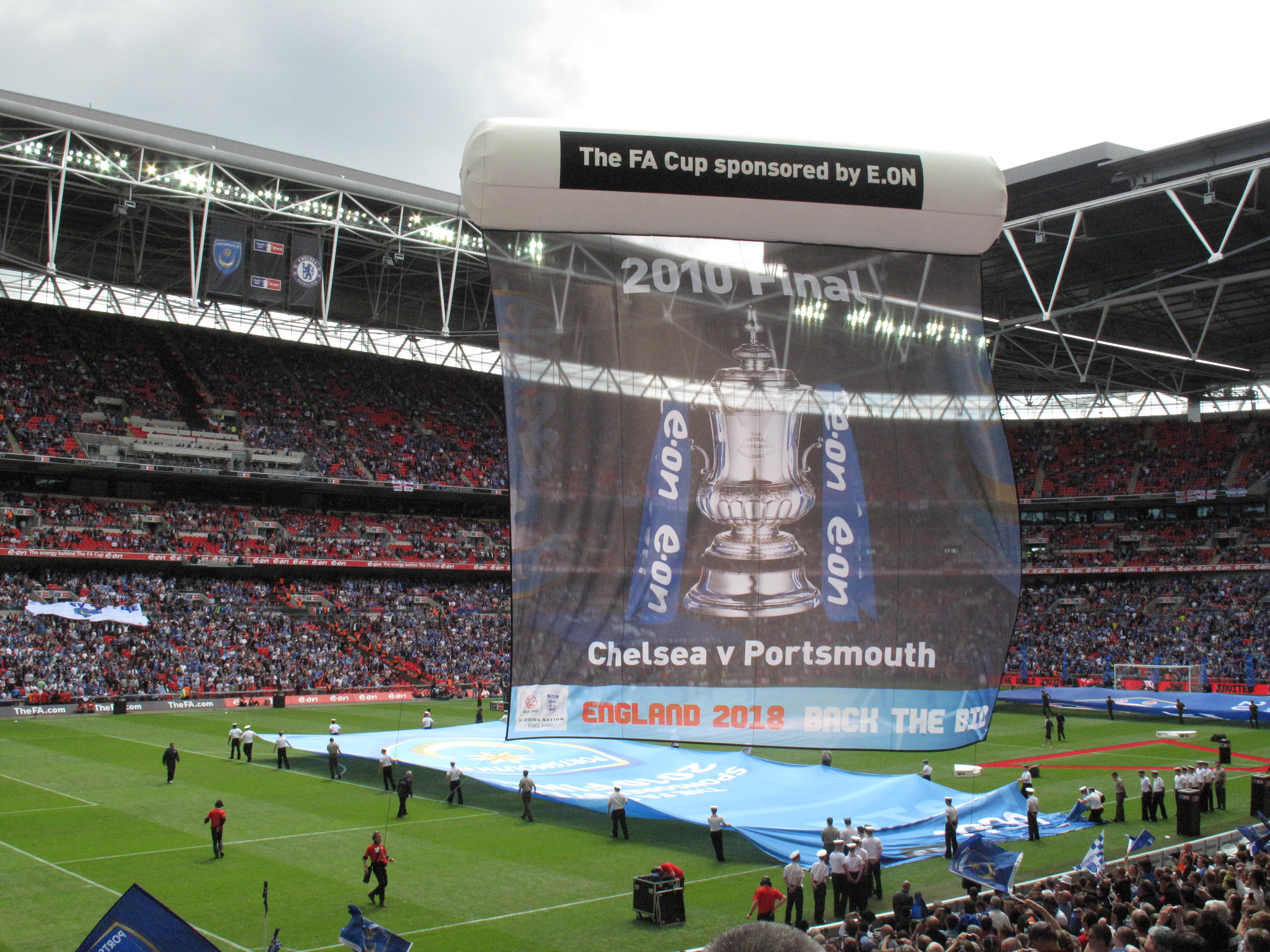
2010 FA Cup Final banner

=== Match ball ===
The match ball for the 2010 FA Cup Final was the Umbro NeoPro. The ball has an irregular 14-panel configuration, and the panels are cut using lasers, which Umbro claim cause the ball to have a smoother flight through the air. The ball will be used for all matches in the 2010–11 FA Cup from the Second Round onwards.

=== Officials ===
Merseyside-based referee Chris Foy was named as the referee for the 2010 FA Cup Final on 13 April 2010. Foy's previous assignments as the primary referee at Wembley Stadium included the 2007 FA Trophy Final and the 2009 FA Community Shield. He was also the fourth official for the 2008 FA Cup Final.

His assistants for the 2010 final were John Flynn, representing the Royal Air Force Football Association, Shaun Procter-Green of the Lincolnshire Football Association, with Andre Marriner of the Birmingham County Football Association as the fourth official. The reserve match official was the Northamptonshire Football Association's Stuart Burt.

=== Kits ===
Since both sides' first-choice kits are blue, the toss of a coin was used to decide which team had choice of kit. Chelsea won the toss and wore their new blue home kit, while Portsmouth wore a new white change kit with burgundy and salmon pink trim.

=== Opening ceremony ===
Throughout the 2009–10 FA Cup season, the Football Association took the FA Cup trophy on a nationwide tour covering 30 venues. The tour began at AFC Bournemouth's Dean Court stadium on 12 November 2009 and culminated at Trafalgar Square on 13 May 2010, two days before the final. At the events, fans were able to have photos taken with the trophy as well as take part in other interactive activities.

Immediately before the match kicked off, there was a short opening ceremony in which the traditional FA Cup anthem, Abide with Me, was sung by 14-year-old Faryl Smith. The trophy was then placed on a plinth at the mouth of the players' tunnel before the players emerged and lined up along a red carpet. The players were then introduced to the final's chief guest and the official party, after which the national anthem was sung.

== Match ==
=== Details ===
15 May 2010
15:00

Chelsea	1–0	Portsmouth
Drogba 59'; Lampard (penalty missed) 89	Report	Boateng (penalty missed) 54

Wembley Stadium, London
Attendance: 88,335
Referee: Chris Foy (Merseyside)

Chelsea	Portsmouth

GK	1	(Czech Republic) Petr Čech
RB	2	(Serbia) Branislav Ivanović
CB	33	(Brazil) Alex
CB	26	(England) John Terry (c)
LB	3	(England) Ashley Cole
CM	8	(England) Frank Lampard
CM	13	(Germany) Michael Ballack	(substituted off) 44'
CM	15	(France) Florent Malouda
RW	21	(Ivory Coast) Salomon Kalou	(substituted off) 71'
LW	39	(France) Nicolas Anelka	(substituted off) 90'
CF	11	(Ivory Coast) Didier Drogba
Substitutes:
GK	40	(Portugal) Hilário
DF	19	(Portugal) Paulo Ferreira
DF	35	(Brazil) Juliano Belletti	(substituted on) 44'
MF	10	(England) Joe Cole	(substituted on) 71'
MF	18	(Russia) Yuri Zhirkov
MF	24	(Serbia) Nemanja Matić
FW	23	(England) Daniel Sturridge	(substituted on) 90'
Manager:
(Italy) Carlo Ancelotti

GK	1	(England) David James (c)
RB	16	(Republic of Ireland) Steve Finnan
CB	3	(Portugal) Ricardo Rocha	(yellow card) 90+1'
CB	4	(South Africa) Aaron Mokoena
LB	6	(England) Hayden Mullins		(substituted off) 81'
RM	24	(Ivory Coast) Aruna Dindane
CM	11	(England) Michael Brown
CM	8	(Senegal) Papa Bouba Diop		(substituted off) 81'
LM	23	(Ghana) Kevin-Prince Boateng	(yellow card) 36'	(substituted off) 73'
SS	5	(England) Jamie O'Hara	(yellow card) 90+1'
CF	9	(France) Frédéric Piquionne
Substitutes:
GK	21	(England) Jamie Ashdown
DF	18	(Belgium) Anthony Vanden Borre
DF	26	(Israel) Tal Ben Haim
DF	39	(Algeria) Nadir Belhadj		(substituted on) 81'
MF	22	(Scotland) Richard Hughes
FW	17	(Nigeria) John Utaka		(substituted on) 73'
FW	27	(Nigeria) Nwankwo Kanu		(substituted on) 81'
Manager:
(Israel) Avram Grant

Man of the match

- Didier Drogba (Chelsea)

Match officials

- Assistant referees:
  - John Flynn (Royal Air Force)
  - Shaun Procter-Green (Lincolnshire)
- Fourth official: Andre Marriner (West Midlands)

Match rules

- 90 minutes.
- 30 minutes of extra-time if necessary.
- Penalty shoot-out if scores still level.
- Seven named substitutes.
- Maximum of three substitutions.

=== Statistics ===
	Chelsea	Portsmouth
Total shots	24	2
Shots on target	10	1
Ball possession	56%	44%
Corner kicks	6	2
Penalty kicks	1	1
Fouls committed	16	14
Offsides	1	2
Yellow cards	0	3
Red cards	0	0

Source: BBC Sport

== Reactions ==
=== Criticism of pitch ===
The much-maligned Wembley pitch came in for criticism from Chelsea captain John Terry following the match. He said, "The pitch ruined the final. It's probably the worst pitch we've played on all year. It was not good enough for a Wembley pitch."

== See also ==
- 2009–10 FA Cup
- 2010 Football League Cup Final
- 2010 FA Trophy Final
