= Maurice McLafferty =

Scottish footballer

Personal information
- Full name: Maurice McLafferty
- Date of birth: 7 August 1922
- Place of birth: Baillieston, Scotland
- Date of death: January 1999 (aged 76)
- Place of death: Worthing, England
- Height: 5 ft 10 in (1.78 m)
- Position: Defender

Senior career*
Years	Team	Apps	(Gls)
1945–1947	Celtic	0	(0)
1947–1950	Glenavon		
1950–1951	St Mirren	1	(0)
1951–1952	Sheffield United	18	(0)
1952–1954	Brighton & Hove Albion	21	(0)
1954–195?	Dartford		
- Hastings United
1958–195?	Newhaven		
- * Club domestic league appearances and goals

Maurice McLafferty (7 August 1922 – January 1999) was a Scottish professional footballer who played in the Scottish League for St Mirren and in the English Football League as a defender for Sheffield United and Brighton & Hove Albion.

== Life and career ==
McLafferty was born in Baillieston, Scotland, in 1922. He was on Celtic's books after the Second World War, represented the Royal Air Force at football in 1946, and signed for Irish League club Glenavon in August 1947. He played twice for the Irish League representative team in March 1948, before returning to Scotland to sign for St Mirren in 1950. He made one appearance in the 1950–51 Scottish Division One season, and then moved to England to join Second Division club Sheffield United. Despite making 18 Second Division appearances, he was transfer-listed at the end of the season at a fee of £1,000. He rejected a return to Scottish football with Aberdeen in favour of remaining in England and dropping down a division with Brighton & Hove Albion.

Initially a reserve, McLafferty shared the left-back position with Reg Fox once Jack Mansell left the club in October 1952, and made 22 appearances in league and FA Cup combined. Both men lost their place to new arrival Jim Langley, and McLafferty moved into Southern League football with Dartford and Hastings United. After losing out to Frank Neary for the appointment as player-coach of Lewes, McLafferty took up the corresponding post at another Sussex County League club, Newhaven.

Off the field, McLafferty worked in Brighton & Hove Albion's fund-raising office and as steward of a gentlemen's social club. He died in Worthing, West Sussex, in 1999 at the age of 76.
