= Reg Fox =

English footballer

Personal information
- Full name: Reginald Allan Fox
- Date of birth: 16 October 1929
- Place of birth: Tufnell Park, England
- Date of death: 19 April 2010 (aged 80)
- Place of death: Brighton, England
- Height: 5 ft 8 in (1.73 m)
- Position: Full back

Youth career
- Tottenham Hotspur

Senior career*
Years	Team	Apps	(Gls)
- Tufnell Park
194?–1952	Fulham	0	(0)
1949	Dover		
1952–1956	Brighton & Hove Albion	20	(0)
1956	Mansfield Town	0	(0)
1956–1957	Hastings United		
1957–1958	Tonbridge Angels	5	(0)
- Folkestone Town
- Lewes
- * Club domestic league appearances and goals

Reginald Allan Fox (16 October 1929 – 19 April 2010) was an English professional footballer who played in the Football League as a full back for Brighton & Hove Albion. He was on the books of Fulham and Mansfield Town without appearing for their League team, and played non-league football for Tufnell Park, Dover, Hastings United, Tonbridge Angels, Folkestone Town and Lewes.

== Life and career ==
Fox was born in Tufnell Park, London, in 1929. He was with Tottenham Hotspur as a youngster and played amateur football for Isthmian League club Tufnell Park. During his National Service with the Royal Signals, he represented the Army team, as well as playing Kent League football for Dover while stationed locally. He was at that time on Fulham's books as an amateur, and signed professional forms in December 1949. He remained with the club for three years without appearing for their Football League team, then joined Brighton & Hove Albion of the Third Division South on 1 October 1952 as replacement for Jack Mansell who was leaving for First Division football with Cardiff City. He went straight into the team for the next day's visit to Bournemouth & Boscombe Athletic and performed well, albeit in a losing cause.

Competition at full back was such that he and Maurice McLafferty shared the left-back position for 1952–53, and in the following three seasons Fox made just ten appearances in league and FA Cup combined. He rejected Brighton's offer of terms for 1956–57, and joined Mansfield Town on a month's trial in August 1956; his performances for the club's junior teams earned him the offer of a contract, but Brighton wanted a higher fee than Mansfield were prepared to pay. Soon afterwards, Fox moved on to Hastings United of the Southern League on a free transfer.

He spent the 1957–58 season with Tonbridge Angels as captain of the reserves and occasional first-teamer, making five appearances in the Southern League and one in the Kent Senior Cup., and later played for Folkestone Town and Lewes.

Fox settled in Brighton, where he died in 2010 at the age of 80.
