= Army Football Association =

English county football association for football within the British Army

- Army FA logo
- Formation: 1888; 138 years ago
- Purpose: Football association
- Headquarters: Aldershot Military Stadium
- Location: Aldershot
- President: General Sir P A Wall KCB CBE
- Website: armyfa.com

The Army Football Association (Army FA) is a county football association affiliated to The Football Association of England, for the administration of football within the British Army in the United Kingdom, Cyprus and Germany. The Army FA is based at Clayton Barracks in Aldershot, Hampshire. As well as organising inter-corps leagues and cups, the Army FA also organises representative games against the Royal Navy, Royal Air Force and civilian teams, with home games being played at the Aldershot Military Stadium.

== Army FA Cup ==
The "Army FA Challenge Cup" is the foremost football cup competition for teams affiliated to the Army FA.

The competition is held annually, with four exceptions, 1888–1900, 1914–19 (World War I), 1939–45 (World War II) and 2020–21 (COVID-19 pandemic).

The current holders are 3rd Battalion Parachute Regiment who beat 23 Parachute Engineer Regiment in the 2023 final.

SEME (Note: School of Electrical & Mechanical Engineering) is the most winning team with 8 titles.

=== Finals ===
Season	Winner	Result	Runner-up	Notes
1888–89	2nd Bn Argyll & Sutherland Highlanders	2–0	2nd Bn South Staffordshire Regiment	
1889–90	2nd Bn Black Watch	3–1	2nd Bn Scots Guards	
1890–91	2nd Bn Scots Guards	2–0	2nd Bn Argyll & Sutherland Highlanders	
1891–92	2nd Bn Scots Guards	2–1	1st Bn Scots Guards	
1892–93	2nd Bn Queen's Own Royal West Kent Regiment	1–0	1st Bn Sherwood Foresters	(Note: First match ended 0–0.)
1893–94	2nd Bn Black Watch	7–2	Royal Artillery Gosport	
1894–95	Royal Artillery Portsmouth	2–0	2nd Bn Black Watch	
1895–96	1st Bn Royal Scots	3–1	2nd Bn Queen's Own Royal West Kent Regiment	
1896–97	Royal Artillery Portsmouth	1–0	1st Bn Lancashire Fusiliers	
1897–98	Royal Artillery Portsmouth	1–0	Gordon Highlanders	
1898–99	1st Bn South Lancashire Regiment	3–0	Army Service Corps Aldershot	
1899–00	No competition held.			
1900–01	2nd Highland Light Infantry	1–0	3rd Bn Coldstream Guards	
1901–02	2nd Bn Black Watch	1–0	4th Bn Lancashire Fusiliers	(Note: First match ended 0–0.)
1902–03	Service Bn Royal Engineers	2–0	2nd Bn North Staffordshire Regiment	(Note: First match ended 1–1.)
1903–04	Royal Marine Artillery	1–0	Service Bn Royal Engineers	
1904–05	2nd Grenadier Guards	2–1	Service Bn Royal Engineers	
1905–06	Depot & District Bn Royal Engineers	1–0	1st Bn Cheshire Regiment	
1906–07	Depot Bn Royal Engineers	3–0	2nd Bn Bedfordshire Regiment	
1907–08	4th Bn King's Royal Rifle Corps	1–0	2nd Bn Lancashire Fusiliers	
1908–09	2nd Bn Royal Irish Rifles	1–0	Royal Artillery Shoeburyness	
1909–10	Royal Marine Light Infantry Gosport	2–0	1st Bn Royal Irish Fusiliers	
1910–11	2nd Bn Sherwood Foresters	3–1	2nd Bn Durham Light Infantry	
1911–12	2nd Bn Sherwood Foresters	5–1	4th Bn Middlesex Regiment	
1912–13	2nd Bn Durham Light Infantry	1–0	1st Bn East Yorkshire Regiment	
1913–14	Army Service Corps Woolwich	1–0	1st Bn Hampshire Regiment	
1914–19	No competition held due to World War I.			
1919–20	Royal Army Medical Corps Aldershot	1–0	1st Bn Hampshire Regiment	
1920–21	Royal Army Medical Corps Aldershot	1–0	4th Res. Brigade Royal Field Artillery	
1921–22	1st Bn Wiltshire Regiment	3–1	2nd Bn Royal Welch Fusiliers	
1922–23	Royal Army Service Corps (Training Establishment)	1–0	2nd Bn Queen's Own Cameron Highlanders	(Note: After extra-time.)
1923–24	1st Bn Wiltshire Regiment	1–0	Royal Artillery Shoeburyness	
1924–25	1st Bn Queen's Royal Regiment West Surrey	3–0	1st Bn Somerset Light Infantry	
1925–26	2nd Bn South Staffordshire Regiment	2–1	2nd Bn Leicestershire Regiment	
1926–27	2nd Bn Leicestershire Regiment	2–1	Royal Army Ordnance Corps Southern Comm	
1927–28	Royal Army Ordnance Corps Southern Comm	2–1	1st Brigade Royal Horse Artillery	
1928–29	1st Bn King's Own Scottish Borderers	3–2	1st Bn Warwickshire Regiment	
1929–30	1st Bn Sherwood Foresters	3–2	2nd Bn Rifle Brigade	
1930–31	1st Bn Sherwood Foresters	2–1	4th Divisional Signals Royal Corps of Signals	
1931–32	1st Bn Sherwood Foresters	3–1	1st Bn Duke of Wellington's Regiment	
1932–33	2nd Bn Queen's Own Cameron Highlanders	3–2	2nd Bn Rifle Brigade	(Note: First match ended 2–2.)
1933–34	2nd Bn King's Own Royal Regiment	3–0	2nd Bn Royal Tank Corps	
1934–35	4th Bn Royal Tank Corps	6–3	2nd Bn Royal Ulster Rifles	
1935–36	10th Field Brigade Royal Artillery	1–0	5th Royal Inniskilling Dragoon Guards	
1936–37	Royal Army Service Corps Training Centre Aldershot	2–1	Training Bn Royal Engineers	
1937–38	Royal Artillery Shoeburyness	4–0	1st Bn Royal Welch Fusiliers	
1938–39	9th Field Regiment Royal Artillery	1–0	2nd Bn Durham Light Infantry	
1939–46	No competition held due to World War II.			
1946–47	Royal Engineers Barton Stacey	1–0	2nd Bn Irish Guards British Army of the Rhine	
1947–48	Royal Armoured Corps Bovington; 121st Training Regiment RA	–		(Note: First match ended 0–0. Second match abandoned after 20 minutes as the lightning struck the field and caused the death of two players. Trophy shared. 121st Training Regiment in now 64th Training Regiment)
1948–49	Depot & Training Establishment Royal Army Medical Corps	6–0	64th Training Regiment RA	
1949–50	3rd Bn Training Basic Royal Army Ordnance Corps	2–1	64th Training Regiment RA	
1950–51	4th Bn Training Royal Electrical & Mechanical Engineers	2–1	1st Bn East Yorkshire Regiment	
1951–52	67th Training Regiment Royal Armoured Corps	2–1	7th Training Regiment Royal Corps of Signals	
1952–53	7th Training Regiment Royal Corps of Signals	3–2	28th Bn Training Basic Royal Army Ordnance Corps	
1953–54	9th Bn Training Basic Royal Army Ordnance Corps	4–3	6th CIC Army Catering Corps	
1954–55	2nd Bn Durham Light Infantry	1–0	Training Centre Royal Army Pay Corps	
1955–56	2nd Training Regiment Royal Corps of Signals	3–2	1st Bn Argyll & Sutherland Highlanders	
1956–57	4th Bn Army Training Royal Electrical & Mechanical Engineers	2–1	Training Centre Royal Army Pay Corps	
1957–58	4th Bn Army Training Royal Electrical & Mechanical Engineers	1–0	Training Centre Royal Army Pay Corps	
1958–59	16th/5th The Queen's Royal Lancers	6–2	1st Bn Royal Scots	
1959–60	29th Coy Royal Army Ordnance Corps	2–1	6th Bn Training Royal Army Service Corps	
1960–61	2nd Bn Training Royal Army Service Corps	4–1	6th Bn Training Royal Army Service Corps	
1961–62	6th Bn Royal Army Ordnance Corps	2–1	6th Bn Training Royal Army Service Corps	
1962–63	10th Royal Hussars	2–1	1st Bn Sherwood Foresters	
1963–64	6th Para RAOC/REME	2–1	13th/18th Queen's Royal Irish Hussars	(Note: First match ended 2–2.)
1964–65	School of Electrical & Mechanical Engineering	6–3	1st Bn Royal Highland Fusiliers	
1965–66	24th Regiment Royal Corps of Signals	4–1	13th/18th Queen's Royal Irish Hussars	
1966–67	11th Hussars Prince of Wales's Own	3–0	1st Bn King's Regiment	
1967–68	1st Bn Parachute Regiment	1–0	HQ British Army of the Rhine	
1968–69	1st Bn Royal Highland Fusiliers	3–0	4th Divisional Engineers	
1969–70	1st Bn Royal Highland Fusiliers	4–2	32nd Engineer Regiment	
1970–71	School of Electrical & Mechanical Engineering	3–1	32nd Engineer Regiment	
1971–72	Royal Army Pay Corps Worthy Town	2–1	36th Heavy Air Defence Regiment	
1972–73	Training Centre Royal Corps of Transport	2–1	28th Signal Regiment (NORTHAG)	
1973–74	School of Electrical & Mechanical Engineering	4–2	28th Signal Regiment (NORTHAG)	
1974–75	8th Signal Regiment	4–2	28th Signal Regiment (NORTHAG)	
1975–76	School of Electrical & Mechanical Engineering	2–0	22nd Signal Regiment	
1976–77	28th Signal Regiment (NORTHAG)	2–0	School of Electrical & Mechanical Engineering	
1977–78	39th Regiment Royal Artillery	1–0	28th Signal Regiment (NORTHAG)	(Note: First match ended 1–1.)
1978–79	1st Bn Royal Highland Fusiliers	1–0	22nd Royal Corps of Signal Regiment	
1979–80	Training Regiment Royal Engineers	1–0	39th Regiment Royal Artillery	
1980–81	28th Amphibious Regiment	2–0	School of Electrical & Mechanical Engineering	
1981–82	28th Signal Regiment (NORTHAG)	1–0	School of Electrical & Mechanical Engineering	
1982–83	School of Electrical & Mechanical Engineering	1–0	28th Amphibious Regiment	
1983–84	School of Electrical & Mechanical Engineering	1–0	45th Field Regiment Royal Artillery	
1984–85	1st Bn King's Regiment	3–2	40th Army Engineer Support Group	
1985–86	School of Electrical & Mechanical Engineering	3–0	28th Amphibious Regiment	
1986–87	28th Signal Regiment (NORTHAG)	4–3	School of Electrical & Mechanical Engineering	(Note: First match ended 4–4.)
1987–88	School of Electrical & Mechanical Engineering	4–3	28th Amphibious Regiment	
1988–89	10th Royal Corps of Transport	5–0	Royal School of Signals	
1989–90	28th Amphibious Regiment	7–1	School of Electrical & Mechanical Engineering	
1990–91	8th Amphibious Regiment	2–1	1st & 3rd Training Regiment Royal Engineers	(Note: First match ended 0–0.)
1991–92	28th Engineer Regiment	2–0	2nd Royal Corps of Signal Regiment	
1992–93	28th Engineer Regiment	1–0	Training Regiment Royal Engineers	
1993–94	28th Engineer Regiment	2–1	2nd Royal Corps of Signal Regiment	
1994–95	2nd Royal Corps of Signal Regiment	1–0	3rd Royal School of Military Engineering	
1995–96	28th Engineer Regiment	2–0	1st Bn Cheshire Regiment	
1996–97	3rd Royal School of Military Engineering	3–0	1st Bn Argyll and Sutherland Highlanders	
1997–98	3rd Bn Royal Electrical and Mechanical Engineers	2–0	3rd Bn Royal School of Military Engineering	
1998–99	3rd Bn Royal Electrical and Mechanical Engineers	2–1	1st Bn Cheshire Regiment	
1999–00	28th Engineer Regiment	1–0	1st Bn Cheshire Regiment	
2000–01	28th Engineer Regiment	3–3	3rd Bn Royal School of Military Engineering	(Note: 28th Engineer Regiment won 5–4 on penalties.)
2001–02	28th Engineer Regiment	2–1	1st Bn King's Regiment	
2002–03	6th Bn Royal Electrical and Mechanical Engineers	4–0	11th Royal Corps of Signal Regiment	
2003–04	2nd Bn Royal Irish	1–0	6th Bn Royal Electrical and Mechanical Engineers	
2004–05	6th Bn Support Royal Electrical and Mechanical Engineers	2–2	4th Line Support Royal Logistic Corps	(Note: 6th Bn Royal Electrical and Mechanical Engineers won 4–2 on penalties.)
2005–06	4th Line Support Royal Logistic Corps	5–5	4th Bn Royal Irish	(Note: 4th Line Support won 4–3 on penalties.)
2006–07	3rd Bn UK Division HQ/Royal Corps of Signal Regiment	2–0	5th Bn Royal Scots	
2007–08	9th Regiment Army Air Corps	3–0	3rd Royal Yorkshire Regiment	
2008–09	3rd Bn UK Division HQ/Royal Corps of Signal Regiment	3–0	7th Air Assault Bn Royal Electrical & Mechanical Engineers	
2009–10	2nd Parachute Regiment	3–1	6th Bn Royal Electrical and Mechanical Engineers	
2010–11	3rd Royal Yorkshire Regiment	1–1	9th Regiment Army Air Corps	(Note: 3rd Royal Yorkshire Regiment won 4–3 on penalties.)
2011–12	2nd Royal Corps of Signal Regiment	2–0	2nd Royal Fusiliers	
2012–13	22nd Royal Corps of Signal Regiment	4–1	3rd Royal School of Military Engineering	
2013–14	22nd Royal Corps of Signal Regiment	4–0	1st Bn Royal Yorkshire Regiment	
2014–15	7th Regiment Royal Logistic Corps	4–2	30th Royal Corps of Signal Regiment	
2015–16	7th Regiment Royal Logistic Corps	3–1	1st Bn Royal Yorkshire Regiment	
2016–17	1st Bn Royal Yorkshire Regiment	3–2	30th Royal Corps of Signal Regiment	
2017–18	1st Bn Royal Yorkshire Regiment	2–1	3rd Royal School of Military Engineering	
2018–19	21st Royal Engineer Regiment	4–2	3rd Regiment Army Air Corps	
2019–20	7th Regiment Royal Logistic Corps	4–0	3rd Royal School of Military Engineering	
2020–21	No competition due to COVID-19 pandemic.			
2021–22	4th Regiment Royal Logistic Corps	3–2	1st Merican	(Note: Merican is a historical nickname given to Royal Artillery.)
2022–23	3rd Para Regiment	3–2	23rd Para Regiment	
2023–24	1 Bn Mercian Regiment	3–0	Royal Tank Regiment	
2024–25	23 PARA Engineer Regiment		7th Parachute RHA	

== Gallery ==
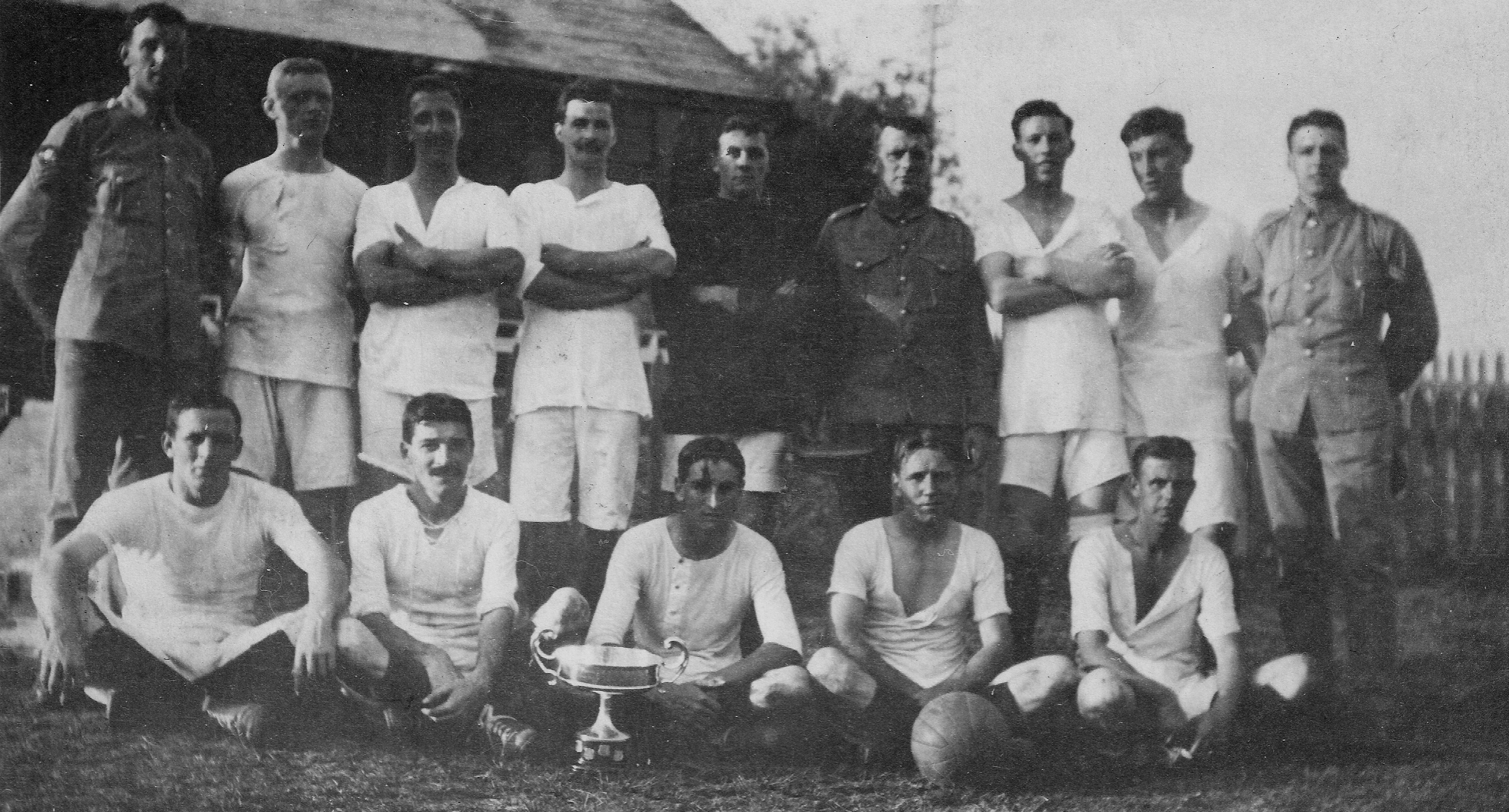
The football team of 95 Company, Royal Garrison Artillery, victors in the 1917 Governor's Cup football match, contested by teams from the Royal Navy and the British Army's Bermuda Garrison.

== See also ==
- Royal Air Force Football Association
- Royal Marines Football Association
- Royal Navy Football Association
