= 2008–09 Conference League Cup =

Tournament details
- Country: England; Wales
- Teams: 68

Final positions
- Champions: A.F.C. Telford United (1st title)
- Runners-up: Forest Green Rovers

The Conference League Cup 2008–09, known as the Setanta Shield 2008–09 for sponsorship reasons, is the second season of the Conference League Cup competition after its resurrection by Conference sponsors Blue Square and competition sponsors Setanta. With the entrance of all Conference teams from every division, there will be 68 entries into the tournament. The total prize money is £200,000. Teams in the Conference's two regional divisions enter in the first round, are joined by the six lowest-ranked Conference National teams in the second with the competition completed by the final eighteen clubs for the third round. The tournament was abolished upon the completion of this edition.

== Calendar ==
| Round | Date | Matches | Clubs | New entries this round | Prize money |
|---|---|---|---|---|---|
| First Round | 8 September 2008 | 22 | 68 → 46 | 44 | £2,000 |
| Second Round | 6 October 2008 | 14 | 46 → 32 | 6 | £3,000 |
| Third Round | 4 November 2008 | 16 | 32 → 16 | 18 | £3,500 |
| Fourth Round | 2 December 2008 | 8 | 16 → 8 | none | £4,500 |
| Quarter-finals | 12 January 2009 | 4 | 8 → 4 | none | £7,000 |
| Semi-finals | 2009 | 2 | 4 → 2 | none | £10,000 |
| Final | 2009 | 1 | 2 → 1 | none | Winner: £16,000; Loser: £8,000 |

== First round ==
The First Round was contested by all 44 teams from the Northern and Southern Divisions, which were divided into a Northern and Southern section. Matches were played in the week commencing 8 September 2008, with the exceptions of the Alfreton Town versus Stafford Rangers and Redditch United versus Solihull Moors games, which were played on 16 September and 23 September respectively, after both fixtures were postponed due to waterlogged pitches.

=== Northern Section ===
| Tie no | Home team | Score | Away team | Attendance |
|---|---|---|---|---|
| 1 | Hyde United | 1–2 | Vauxhall Motors | 97 |
| 2 | Droylsden | 1–2 | Gateshead | 190 |
| 3 | Stalybridge Celtic | 1–4 | Southport | 231 |
| 4 | Harrogate Town | 1–1 | Fleetwood Town | 174 |
Fleetwood won 5–4 on penalties
| 5 | Farsley Celtic | 3–1 | Workington | 101 |
| 6 | Burscough | 1–4 | Blyth Spartans | 160 |
| 7 | Hucknall Town | 1–3 | Hinckley United | 192 |
| 8 | A.F.C. Telford United | 3–2 | Gainsborough Trinity | 652 |
| 9 | Redditch United | 0–1 | Solihull Moors | 157 |
| 10 | Alfreton Town | 2–3 | Stafford Rangers | 201 |
| 11 | King's Lynn | 1–2 | Tamworth | 510 |

=== Southern Section ===
| Tie no | Home team | Score | Away team | Attendance |
|---|---|---|---|---|
| 12 | Dorchester Town | 4–5 | Newport County | 178 |
| 13 | Team Bath | 1–2 | Bath City | |
| 14 | Basingstoke Town | 1–3 | Fisher Athletic | 139 |
| 15 | Maidenhead United | 1–2 | Havant & Waterlooville | 171 |
| 16 | Bognor Regis Town | 2–0 | Worcester City | 168 |
| 17 | Eastleigh | 4–4 | Weston-super-Mare | 173 |
Eastleigh won 5–4 on penalties
| 18 | St. Albans City | 0–1 | Hayes and Yeading | 165 |
| 19 | Thurrock | 2–0 | Welling United | |
| 20 | Chelmsford City | 1–0 | AFC Wimbledon | 575 |
| 21 | Bishop's Stortford | 2–1 | Bromley | 201 |
| 22 | Braintree Town | 3–0 | Hampton & Richmond Borough | 127 |

== Second round ==
The Second Round was contested by the remaining 22 teams from the Northern and Southern Divisions and the six lowest-ranking teams from Conference National. It was divided into a Northern and Southern section. Matches will be played in the week commencing 6 October 2008.

=== Northern Section ===
| Tie no | Home team | Score | Away team | Attendance |
|---|---|---|---|---|
| 1 | Blyth Spartans | 1–2 | Gateshead | 632 |
| 2 | Barrow | 3–2 | Fleetwood Town | 618 |
| 3 | Hinckley United | 2–1 | Tamworth | 267 |
| 4 | A.F.C. Telford United | 2–1 | Solihull Moors | 692 |
| 5 | Vauxhall Motors | 0–3 | Southport | 163 |
| 6 | Altrincham | 1–1 | Farsley Celtic | 259 |
Altrincham won 4–2 on penalties
| 7 | Stafford Rangers | 3–1 | Northwich Victoria | 327 |

=== Southern Section ===
| Tie no | Home team | Score | Away team | Attendance |
|---|---|---|---|---|
| 8 | Bath City | 4–1 | Newport County | 241 |
| 9 | Lewes | 0–2 | Bognor Regis Town | 222 |
| 10 | Kettering Town | 4–2 | Bishop's Stortford | 450 |
| 11 | Fisher Athletic | 2–3 | Eastbourne Borough | 35 |
| 12 | Eastleigh | 2–3 | Havant & Waterlooville | 489 |
| 13 | Chelmsford City | 3–1 | Braintree Town | 474 |
| 14 | Thurrock | 3–3 | Hayes and Yeading | |
Thurrock won 5–4 on penalties

== Third round ==
The Third Round was contested by the remaining 14 teams from the previous fixtures with the addition of the 18 highest-ranked teams from the Conference National. Unlike previous rounds, the draw was not officially divided into a Northern and Southern section although some geographical grouping occurred in the draw. Matches will be played in the week commencing 3 November 2008.

| Tie no | Home team | Score | Away team | Attendance |
|---|---|---|---|---|
| 1 | Barrow | 3–1 | Gateshead F.C | 551 |
| 2 | York City | 1–1 | Mansfield Town | 608 |
York won 4–2 on penalties
| 3 | Forest Green Rovers | 2–1 | Oxford United | 383 |
| 4 | Altrincham | 1–2 | Wrexham | 537 |
| 5 | Stafford Rangers | 1–2 | Southport | 261 |
| 6 | Bath City | 0–1 | Salisbury City | 230 |
| 7 | Weymouth | 0–3 | Torquay United | 621 |
| 8 | Woking | 3–0 | Bognor Regis Town | 480 |
| 9 | Crawley Town | 3–0 | Havant & Waterlooville | 239 |
| 10 | Eastbourne Borough | 1–3 | Ebbsfleet United | 300 |
| 11 | Hinckley United | 2–1 | Histon | 202 |
| 12 | Rushden & Diamonds | 0–3 | Stevenage Borough | 430 |
| 13 | A.F.C. Telford United | 4–3 | Cambridge United | 941 |
| 14 | Kettering Town | 4–1 | Thurrock | 438 |
| 15 | Grays Athletic | 2–4 | Chelmsford City | 262 |
| 16 | Burton Albion | 3–2 | Kidderminster Harriers | 554 |

== Fourth round ==
The Fourth Round was contested by the remaining 16 teams from across the three divisions. Unlike the previous round the draw was officially divided into a Northern and Southern section. Matches will be played in the week commencing 2 December 2008.

=== Northern Section ===
| Tie no | Home team | Score | Away team | Attendance |
|---|---|---|---|---|
| 1 | A.F.C. Telford United | 3–0 | Burton Albion | 875 |
| 2 | Barrow | 3–1 | York City | 596 |
| 3 | Hinckley United | 2 – 3 (aet) | Kettering Town | 270 |
| 4 | Wrexham | 1 – 2 (aet) | Southport | 1,023 |

=== Southern Section ===
| Tie no | Home team | Score | Away team | Attendance |
|---|---|---|---|---|
| 1 | Crawley Town | 2–1 | Chelmsford City | 304 |
| 2 | Ebbsfleet United | 3–0 | Stevenage Borough | 286 |
| 3 | Forest Green Rovers | 1–0 | Torquay United | 421 |
| 4 | Salisbury City | 0–3 | Woking | 297 |

== Quarter-finals ==
The draw for the quarter-finals was held on 9 December 2008. Ties were to be played w/c 12 January 2009 but due to postponements two games were played in January, February and March 2009

=== Northern Section ===
| Tie no | Home team | Score | Away team | Attendance |
|---|---|---|---|---|
| 1 | A.F.C. Telford United | 3 – 2 (aet) | Kettering Town | 874 |
| 2 | Barrow | 3–1 | Southport | 678 |

=== Southern Section ===
| Tie no | Home team | Score | Away team | Attendance |
|---|---|---|---|---|
| 1 | Crawley Town | 1–2 | Ebbsfleet United | 844 |
| 2 | Woking | 2–2 | Forest Green Rovers | 499 |
Forest Green won 5–4 on penalties

== Semi-finals ==
Due to the weather disrupted winter, the semi-finals were delayed and eventually played on 26 March 2009.

=== Northern Section ===
| Tie no | Home team | Score | Away team | Attendance |
|---|---|---|---|---|
| 1 | Barrow | 0–1 | AFC Telford United | 2,109 |

=== Southern Section ===
| Tie no | Home team | Score | Away team | Attendance |
|---|---|---|---|---|
| 1 | Ebbsfleet United | 0–1 | Forest Green Rovers | 431 |

== Final ==
The 2009 Conference League Cup Final took place on 9 April 2009 and was contested by Forest Green Rovers and AFC Telford United at The New Lawn, the home of Forest Green. Rovers had the best of the game but they lacked a cutting edge to see off Telford and ultimately they went on to lose in a penalty shoot-out. Telford goalkeeper Ryan Young saved penalties from Andy Mangan, Conal Platt, and Paul Lloyd, whilst Jon Adams, Mark Danks, and Gavin Cowan were all successful from the spot for United.

9 April 2009
20:00 BST

| Forest Green Rovers | 0–0 (a.e.t.) | AFC Telford United |
|---|---|---|
| | Report |
Penalties
| Mangan (penalty missed); Platt (penalty missed); Lloyd (penalty missed) | 0–3 | (penalty scored) Adams; (penalty scored) Danks; (penalty scored) Cowan |

The New Lawn, Nailsworth, Gloucestershire
Attendance: 2323
Referee: Steve Creighton (Berkshire)
