= Mark Danks =

English footballer (born 1984)

Personal information
- Full name: Mark James Danks
- Date of birth: 8 February 1984 (age 42)
- Place of birth: Warley, England
- Height: 5 ft 9 in (1.75 m)
- Position: Striker

Team information
- Current team: Telford Town

Senior career*
Years	Team	Apps	(Gls)
2001–2002	Wolverhampton Wanderers	0	(0)
2002–2003	Bradford City	3	(0)
2003	→ Halesowen Town (loan)	12	(3)
2003–2004	Hednesford Town	35	(13)
2004–2006	Forest Green Rovers	17	(0)
2004	→ Stafford Rangers (loan)	6	(0)
2005	→ Kettering Town (loan)	9	(0)
2005	→ Bromsgrove Rovers (loan)	7	(2)
2005–2006	→ Cirencester Town (loan)	7	(4)
2006–2008	Worcester City	50	(25)
2008–2009	Halesowen Town		
2009	AFC Telford United		
2009–2010	Northwich Victoria	12	(6)
2010–2011	Worcester City		
2011–2012	Hednesford Town		
2012	Stourbridge	1	(0)
2012	Airbus UK Broughton		
2012	Redditch United		
2012	Evesham United		
2012–2014	Sutton Coldfield Town		
2014	Halesowen Town		
2014	Rushall Olympic		
2014	AFC Bridgnorth		
2014	Lye Town		
2014	Hednesford Town		
2014–2015	Chasetown		
2015	Sutton Coldfield Town		
2015	→ Boldmere St. Michaels (loan)		
2015–2016	Tividale		
2016	Romulus		
2016–2017	Lye Town		
2017–2018	Worcester City		
2018	→ Worcester Raiders (dual registration)		
2018–	Stourport Swifts		
- * Club domestic league appearances and goals as of 20:39, 26 November 2012 (UTC)

Mark James Danks (born 8 February 1984) is an English footballer currently with Telford Town

He had previous professional experience with Bradford City in the 2002–03 season and won the FA Trophy with Hednesford Town in the 2003–04 season and also won the Conference League Cup with A.F.C. Telford United in the 2008–09 season.

== Career ==
=== Football League ===
Danks began his career at Wolverhampton Wanderers, where he played for England U15 and U16, before joining Bradford City for a season in August 2002. Although restricted to four substitute appearances he scored his first goal in senior football in an FA Cup match against West Bromwich Albion, which Bradford lost 3–1.

=== Non-League career ===
He went to Halesowen Town of the Southern League Premier Division on a month loan in March 2003 where he scored on his debut at Ilkeston Town. He was released by Bradford City at the end of the 2002–03 season.

Danks joined Hednesford Town in July 2003 and went on to win the FA Trophy with them in 2004. He joined Conference National club Forest Green Rovers in August 2004, where he did not have the best of times, going out on loan for a month to Stafford Rangers in September 2004, on loan to Kettering Town in the Conference North in March 2005, on loan for two months to Bromsgrove Rovers in September 2005 and on loan for a month to Cirencester Town in December 2005.

He joined Worcester City on a non-contract basis and then signed a contract until the end of the 2007–08 season in March 2006.

In May 2008, Danks joined Halesowen Town.

In February 2009, Danks joined Conference North side Telford United on a contract until the end of the season. He scored a penalty in the Conference League Cup final against his former club, Forest Green, as Telford won the final 3–0 on penalties.

In June 2010 Danks re-signed for Conference North club Worcester City from Northwich Victoria.

On 18 June 2011 Danks rejoined Hednesford Town for the 2011–12 season. In January 2012 he joined Stourbridge on a non-contract basis, then Airbus UK Broughton later that month.

During the summer of 2012 he moved to Redditch United, being released in October, followed by an even shorter spell with Evesham United until November 2012. Also in November 2012 he joined Sutton Coldfield Town, scoring four times on his debut for Sutton Coldfield in a Doodson Sports Cup game against Loughborough Dynamo, and then scored the winning goal on his league debut on 1 December 2012 against Carlton Town.

In March 2014, he joined Halesowen Town, extending the deal in May 2014 to be committed for the 2014–15 campaign.

However, following a preseason game between Tamworth and Rushall Olympic on 2 August 2014, he signed for the latter. Following appearances for AFC Bridgnorth, Lye Town, and Hednesford Town for the third time, all during the autumn of 2014, and finally joined Chasetown in December 2014. In February 2015, he switched back to Sutton Coldfield Town for the remainder of the season, although he has a loan spell at Boldmere St. Michaels in March 2015. In May 2015, he agreed terms with The Royals to stay on for another season.

Only weeks into the 2015–16 season he moved to Tividale of the Northern Premier League Division One South. He left in February 2016 to join Romulus, and in October 2016 he rejoined Lye Town. He returned to Worcester City once more in July 2017, after a pre-season stint with Midland League Premier Division rivals Boldmere St. Michaels. In February 2018, he joined Worcester Raiders of the West Midlands (Regional) League Division One on dual registration terms, in order to gain match fitness. They reside in the 11th tier of the English football pyramid.

In June 2018, City manager John Snape revealed that Danks had turned down an offer to commit himself to them for the upcoming season, and instead moved to Black Country Rangers of West Midlands (Regional) League Premier Division. He eventually opted out of the deal to take the role as a player-assistant manager at City's league rivals Stourport Swifts.

In February 2024 Danks joined West Midlands Regional League side Telford Town.

== Honours ==
=== Club ===
Hednesford Town

- FA Trophy: 2003-04

AFC Telford United

- Conference League Cup: 2008–09

=== Individual ===
- 2009–10 FA Cup Player of the Round: First Qualifying Round
