= Royal Marines Football Association =

The Royal Marines Football Association (RMFA), also known as the Royal Marines FA, is the governing body for association football in the Royal Marines.

== History ==
See footnote.

== Inter Services Championships ==
See footnote.

== Inter Regional Competition ==
The Inter Regional Competition – formerly called the Royal Navy Inter Command Competition – is an annual competition for the Inter Regional Cup.

== Tunney Cup ==
The Royal Marines Annual Football Competition began in 1928, following the presentation of a challenge cup – the USMC Challenge Trophy – to the Corps of Royal Marines, from the United States Marine Corps (USMC), in the hope that the cup would be competed for by RM association football teams. The Royal Marines named the cup the "Tunney Cup," in honour of the presenter, US Navy Captain J.J. "Gene" Tunney, a former US Marine and former world heavyweight boxing champion.

== Wall of Fame ==
The Royal Marines Football Association (RMFA) Wall of Fame was established in 1968.

== See also ==
- Royal Marines A.F.C.
- Royal Marines Museum
- Royal Navy Football Association
- Army Football Association
- Royal Air Force Football Association
- R.M.L.I. Gosport F.C.
