= 2009–10 FA Cup =

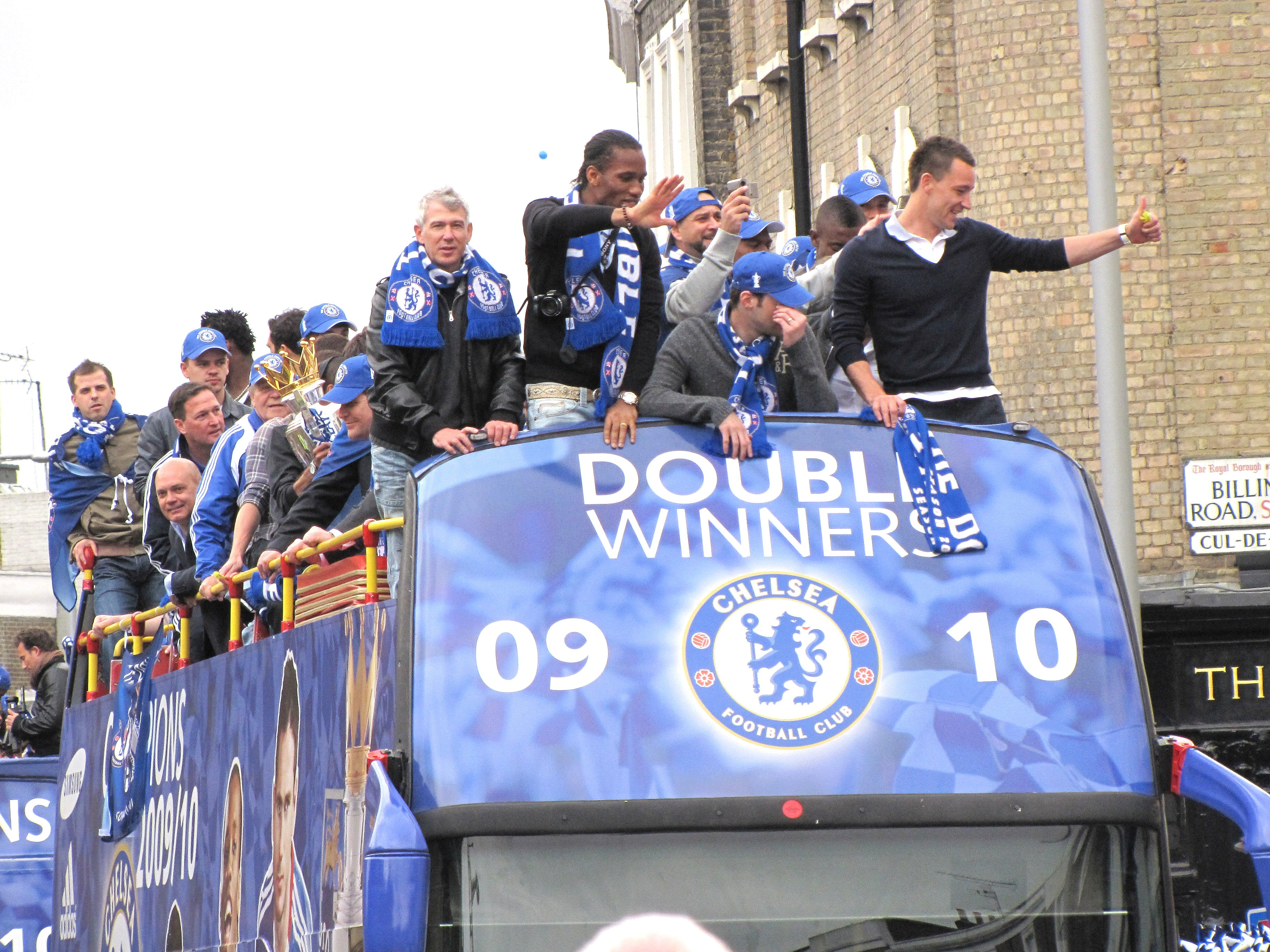
- Chelsea parading their sixth FA Cup title

Tournament details
- Country: England; Wales
- Teams: 762

Final positions
- Champions: Chelsea F.C. (6th title)
- Runners-up: Portsmouth

Tournament statistics
- Top goal scorer: John Carew (6 goals)

The 2009–10 FA Cup (known as the FA Cup sponsored by E.ON for sponsorship reasons) was the 129th season of the world's oldest football knockout competition; the FA Cup. As in the previous year, 762 clubs were accepted for the competition. One club, Newcastle Blue Star, folded before the fixtures were released. As they were scheduled to enter the competition in the first round qualifying, their opponents in this round received a walkover.

The competition commenced on 15 August 2009 with the Extra preliminary round and concluded on 15 May 2010 with the Final, held at Wembley Stadium. The final was contested by 2009 winners Chelsea and 2008 winners Portsmouth. Originally, the winners were to qualify for the play-off round of the 2010–11 UEFA Europa League. However, as Chelsea won the 2009–10 Premier League (and did not need the FA Cup winners' berth), and Portsmouth failed to apply for a UEFA licence for the 2010–11 season in time (making them ineligible to compete in UEFA competitions), the berth was given to Liverpool, the seventh-placed team in the Premier League. Chelsea won 1–0 in the final to retain the trophy.

== Teams ==
Round	Clubs remaining	Clubs involved	Winners from previous round	New entries this round	Leagues entering at this round
Extra preliminary round	762	406	none	406	Levels 9 and 10 in football league pyramid
Preliminary round	559	334	203	131	Northern Premier League Division One North; Northern Premier League Division One South Southern Football League Division One Midlands; Southern Football League Division One South & West; Isthmian League Division One North; Isthmian League Division One South
First round qualifying	392	232	167	65	Northern Premier League Premier Division; Southern Football League Premier Division; Isthmian League Premier Division
Second round qualifying	276	160	116	44	Conference North; Conference South
Third round qualifying	196	80	80	none	none
Fourth round qualifying	156	64	40	24	Conference National
First round proper	124	80	32	48	Football League One; Football League Two
Second round proper	84	40	40	none	none
Third round proper	64	64	20	44	Premier League; Football League Championship
Fourth round proper	32	32	32	none	none
Fifth round proper	16	16	16	none	none
Sixth round proper	8	8	8	none	none
Semi-finals	4	4	4	none	none
Final	2	2	2	none	none

== Calendar ==
The calendar for the 2009–10 FA Cup, as announced by The Football Association:

Round	Main date	Number of fixtures	Clubs	New entries this round	Prize money	Player of the Round
Extra preliminary round	15 August 2009	203	762 → 559	406: 357th–762nd	£750	
Preliminary round	29 August 2009	167	559 → 392	131: 226th–356th	£1,500	
First round qualifying	12 September 2009	116	392 → 276	65: 161st–225th	£3,000	Bobby Traynor (Kingstonian)
Second round qualifying	26 September 2009	80	276 → 196	44: 117th–160th	£4,500	Mark Danks (Northwich Victoria)
Third round qualifying	10 October 2009	40	196 → 156	none	£7,500	Adam Webster (Hinckley United)
Fourth round qualifying	24 October 2009	32	156 → 124	24: 93rd–116th	£12,500	Danny Kedwell (AFC Wimbledon)
First round proper	7 November 2009	40	124 → 84	48: 45th–92nd	£18,000	Richard Brodie (York City)
Second round proper	28 November 2009	20	84 → 64	none	£27,000	Leon Legge (Brentford)
Third round proper	2 January 2010	32	64 → 32	44: 1st–44th	£67,500	Jermaine Beckford (Leeds United)
Fourth round proper	23 January 2010	16	32 → 16	none	£90,000	Jermaine Beckford (Leeds United)
Fifth round proper	13 February 2010	8	16 → 8	none	£180,000	Gareth Bale (Tottenham Hotspur)
Sixth round proper	6 March 2010	4	8 → 4	none	£360,000	Frédéric Piquionne (Portsmouth)
Semi-finals	10–11 April 2010	2	4 → 2	none	Winners: £900,000; Losers: £450,000	Didier Drogba (Chelsea)
Final	15 May 2010	1	2 → 1	none	Winner: £1,800,000; Loser: £900,000	

== Qualifying rounds ==
All teams that entered the competition, but were not members of the Premier League or The Football League, had to compete in the qualifying rounds to secure one of 32 places available in the first round proper.

The winners from the fourth qualifying round were Hinckley United, Nuneaton Town, Wrexham, Gateshead, Rushden & Diamonds, Mansfield Town, Stourbridge, AFC Telford United, Ilkeston Town, Cambridge United, Kettering Town, Northwich Victoria, Barrow, Fleetwood Town, York City, Woking, Lowestoft Town, Salisbury City, AFC Wimbledon, Forest Green Rovers, Oxford City, Bromley, Stevenage Borough, Wealdstone, Eastleigh, Staines Town, Luton Town, Oxford United, Bath City, Paulton Rovers, Tooting & Mitcham United and Sutton United.

Stourbridge, Eastleigh and Paulton Rovers were appearing in the competition proper for the first time. Of the others, Gateshead and Ilkeston Town had last featured at this stage in 2000–01, Oxford City had last done so in 1999-2000, Wealdstone had last done so in 1986-87 and Lowestoft Town and Tooting & Mitcham United had last done so in 1977-78.

== First round proper ==
Teams from Leagues One and Two entered at this stage, along with the 32 non-league clubs from the qualifying rounds. The draw was made on 25 October 2009 with ties played in the week beginning 7 November 2009.

Lowestoft Town and Paulton Rovers of the eighth tier were the lowest ranked teams left in the competition at this stage, but both failed to make it through to the second round.

Tie no	Home team	Score	Away team	Attendance
1	Gillingham (3)	3–0	Southend United (3)	4,605
2	Grimsby Town (4)	0–2	Bath City (6)	2,103
3	Gateshead (5)	2–2	Brentford (3)	1,150
replay	Brentford (3)	5–2	Gateshead (5)	1,960
4	Chesterfield (4)	1–3	AFC Bournemouth (4)	3,277
5	AFC Telford United (6)	1–3	Lincoln City (4)	2,809
6	Stockport County (3)	5–0	Tooting & Mitcham United (7)	3,076
7	Burton Albion (4)	3–2	Oxford City (7)	2,207
8	Barrow (5)	2–1	Eastleigh (6)	1,655
9	Oldham Athletic (3)	0–2	Leeds United (3)	5,552
10	Cambridge United (5)	4–0	Ilkeston Town (6)	2,395
11	York City (5)	3–2	Crewe Alexandra (4)	3,070
12	Wycombe Wanderers (3)	4–4	Brighton & Hove Albion (3)	2,749
replay	Brighton & Hove Albion (3)	2–0	Wycombe Wanderers (3)	3,383
13	Hereford United (4)	2–0	Sutton United (7)	1,713
14	Nuneaton Town (7)	0–4	Exeter City (3)	2,452
15	Bristol Rovers (3)	2–3	Southampton (3)	6,646
16	Carlisle United (3)	2–2	Morecambe (4)	4,181
replay	Morecambe (4)	0–1	Carlisle United (3)	3,307
17	Forest Green Rovers (5)	1–1	Mansfield Town (5)	1,149
replay	Mansfield Town (5)	1–2	Forest Green Rovers (5)	2,496
18	Oxford United (5)	1–0	Yeovil Town (3)	6,144
19	Paulton Rovers (8)	0–7	Norwich City (3)	2,070
20	Swindon Town (3)	1–0	Woking (6)	4,805

Tie no	Home team	Score	Away team	Attendance
21	Port Vale (4)	1–1	Stevenage Borough (5)	3,999
replay	Stevenage Borough (5)	0–1	Port Vale (4)	2,894
22	Luton Town (5)	3–3	Rochdale (4)	3,167
replay	Rochdale (4)	0–2	Luton Town (5)	1,982
23	Bromley (6)	0–4	Colchester United (3)	4,242
24	Accrington Stanley (4)	2–1	Salisbury City (5)	1,379
25	Millwall (3)	4–1	AFC Wimbledon (5)	9,453
26	Stourbridge (7)	0–1	Walsall (3)	2,014
27	Shrewsbury Town (4)	0–1	Staines Town (6)	3,359
28	Wealdstone (7)	2–3	Rotherham United (4)	1,638
29	Torquay United (4)	3–1	Cheltenham Town (4)	2,370
30	Barnet (4)	3–1	Darlington (4)	1,654
31	Notts County (4)	2–1	Bradford City (4)	4,213
32	Huddersfield Town (3)	6–1	Dagenham & Redbridge (4)	5,858
33	Milton Keynes Dons (3)	1–0	Macclesfield Town (4)	4,868
34	Rushden & Diamonds (5)	3–1	Hinckley United (6)	1,540
35	Northwich Victoria (6)	1–0	Charlton Athletic (3)	2,153
36	Aldershot Town (4)	2–0	Bury (4)	2,519
37	Wrexham (5)	1–0	Lowestoft Town (8)	2,402
38	Hartlepool United (3)	0–1	Kettering Town (5)	2,645
39	Tranmere Rovers (3)	1–1	Leyton Orient (3)	3,180
replay	Leyton Orient (3)	0–1	Tranmere Rovers (3)	1,518
40	Northampton Town (4)	2–1	Fleetwood Town (6)	3,077

== Second round proper ==
The matches took place on 28 and 29 November 2009 and involved the 40 winning teams from the previous round.

Bath City and Staines Town from the Conference South, and Northwich Victoria from the Conference North (6th tier) were the lowest ranked teams left at this stage, but none made it through to the third round.

Tie no	Home team	Score	Away team	Attendance
1	Northwich Victoria (6)	1–3	Lincoln City (4)	3,544
2	Northampton Town (4)	2–3	Southampton (3)	4,858
3	Hereford United (4)	0–1	Colchester United (3)	2,225
4	Tranmere Rovers (3)	0–0	Aldershot Town (4)	3,742
replay	Aldershot Town (4)	1–2	Tranmere Rovers (3)	4,060
5	Kettering Town (5)	1–1	Leeds United (3)	4,837
replay	Leeds United (3)	5–1†	Kettering Town (5)	10,670
6	Gillingham (3)	1–0	Burton Albion (4)	4,996
7	Wrexham (5)	0–1	Swindon Town (3)	3,011
8	Brighton & Hove Albion (3)	3–2	Rushden & Diamonds (5)	3,638
9	Rotherham United (4)	2–2	Luton Town (5)	3,210
replay	Luton Town (5)	3–0	Rotherham United (4)	2,518
10	Milton Keynes Dons (3)	4–3	Exeter City (3)	4,867

Tie no	Home team	Score	Away team	Attendance
11	Brentford (3)	1–0	Walsall (3)	2,611
12	Carlisle United (3)	3–1	Norwich City (3)	3,946
13	Accrington Stanley (4)	2–2	Barnet (4)	1,501
replay	Barnet (4)	0–1	Accrington Stanley (4)	1,288
14	Oxford United (5)	1–1	Barrow (5)	6,082
replay	Barrow (5)	3–1	Oxford United (5)	2,754
15	AFC Bournemouth (4)	1–2	Notts County (4)	6,082
16	Stockport County (3)	0–4	Torquay United (4)	1,690
17	Cambridge United (5)	1–2	York City (5)	3,505
18	Bath City (6)	1–2	Forest Green Rovers (5)	3,325
19	Port Vale (4)	0–1	Huddersfield Town (3)	5,311
20	Staines Town (6)	1–1	Millwall (3)	2,753
replay	Millwall (3)	4–0	Staines Town (6)	3,452

† – After extra time

== Third round proper ==
The draw was held on Sunday 29 November 2009 at Wembley Stadium. Premier League and Football League Championship teams entered at this stage, joining the winners from the previous round and completing the entrants. The majority of fixtures took place on 2 and 3 January 2010, with snow postponing several matches until mid-January.

Barrow, Forest Green Rovers, Luton Town and York City from the Conference National (5th tier) were the only non-league teams left at this stage, but none made it through to the fourth round.

Manchester United were knocked out in the third round for the first time since they lost to AFC Bournemouth in 1984, when they lost to third-tier rivals Leeds United. It was also Manchester United's first defeat to a lower league side since defeat at Bournemouth. They were joined by rivals and fellow 'Big Four' club Liverpool, who lost at home to second-flight Reading in a replay.

Tie no	Home team	Score	Away team	Attendance
1	Tottenham Hotspur (1)	4–0	Peterborough United (2)	35,862
2	Brentford (3)	0–1	Doncaster Rovers (2)	2,883
3	Middlesbrough (2)	0–1	Manchester City (1)	12,474
4	Stoke City (1)	3–1	York City (5)	15,586
5	Notts County (4)	2–1	Forest Green Rovers (5)	4,389
6	Huddersfield Town (3)	0–2	West Bromwich Albion (2)	13,472
7	Sheffield United (2)	1–1	Queens Park Rangers (2)	11,461
replay	Queens Park Rangers (2)	2–3	Sheffield United (2)	5,780
8	Milton Keynes Dons (3)	1–2	Burnley (1)	11,816
9	Chelsea (1)	5–0	Watford (2)	40,912
10	Nottingham Forest (2)	0–0	Birmingham City (1)	20,975
replay	Birmingham City (1)	1–0	Nottingham Forest (2)	9,399
11	Preston North End (2)	7–0	Colchester United (3)	7,621
12	West Ham United (1)	1–2	Arsenal (1)	25,549
13	Aston Villa (1)	3–1	Blackburn Rovers (1)	25,453
14	Portsmouth (1)	1–1	Coventry City (2)	11,214
replay	Coventry City (2)	1–2†	Portsmouth (1)	7,097
15	Sunderland (1)	3–0	Barrow (5)	25,190
16	Wigan Athletic (1)	4–1	Hull City (1)	5,335
17	Everton (1)	3–1	Carlisle United (3)	31,196

Tie no	Home team	Score	Away team	Attendance
18	Sheffield Wednesday (2)	1–2	Crystal Palace (2)	8,690
19	Tranmere Rovers (3)	0–1	Wolverhampton Wanderers (1)	7,476
20	Blackpool (2)	1–2	Ipswich Town (2)	7,332
21	Fulham (1)	1–0	Swindon Town (3)	19,623
22	Torquay United (4)	0–1	Brighton & Hove Albion (3)	4,028
23	Scunthorpe United (2)	1–0	Barnsley (2)	5,457
24	Southampton (3)	1–0	Luton Town (5)	18,786
25	Bristol City (2)	1–1	Cardiff City (2)	7,289
replay	Cardiff City (2)	1–0	Bristol City (2)	6,731
26	Reading (2)	1–1	Liverpool (1)	23,656
replay	Liverpool (1)	1–2†	Reading (2)	31,063
27	Millwall (3)	1–1	Derby County (2)	10,531
replay	Derby County (2)	1–1	Millwall (3)	7,183
Derby County won 5 – 3 on penalties
28	Plymouth Argyle (2)	0–0	Newcastle United (2)	16,451
replay	Newcastle United (2)	3–0	Plymouth Argyle (2)	15,805
29	Leicester City (2)	2–1	Swansea City (2)	12,307
30	Bolton Wanderers (1)	4–0	Lincoln City (4)	11,193
31	Accrington Stanley (4)	1–0	Gillingham (3)	1,322
32	Manchester United (1)	0–1	Leeds United (3)	74,526

† – After extra time

== Fourth round proper ==
The draw was held on Sunday 3 January 2010 at Wembley Stadium. Fixtures took place over the weekend of 23 and 24 January 2010.

Accrington Stanley and Notts County from League Two (4th tier) were the lowest ranked teams left at this stage; Accrington Stanley did not proceed further, whilst Notts County defeated Wigan Athletic in a replay at the DW Stadium.

Tie no	Home team	Score	Away team	Attendance
1	Southampton (3)	2–1	Ipswich Town (2)	20,446
2	Reading (2)	1–0	Burnley (1)	12,910
3	Derby County (2)	1–0	Doncaster Rovers (2)	11,316
4	Cardiff City (2)	4–2	Leicester City (2)	10,961
5	Stoke City (1)	3–1	Arsenal (1)	19,735
6	Notts County (4)	2–2	Wigan Athletic (1)	9,073
replay	Wigan Athletic (1)	0–2	Notts County (4)	5,519
7	Scunthorpe United (2)	2–4	Manchester City (1)	8,861
8	West Bromwich Albion (2)	4–2	Newcastle United (2)	16,102
9	Everton (1)	1–2	Birmingham City (1)	30,875
10	Accrington Stanley (4)	1–3	Fulham (1)	3,712
11	Bolton Wanderers (1)	2–0	Sheffield United (2)	14,572
12	Portsmouth (1)	2–1	Sunderland (1)	10,315
13	Preston North End (2)	0–2	Chelsea (1)	23,119
14	Aston Villa (1)	3–2	Brighton & Hove Albion (3)	39,725
15	Wolverhampton Wanderers (1)	2–2	Crystal Palace (2)	14,449
replay	Crystal Palace (2)	3–1	Wolverhampton Wanderers (1)	10,282
16	Tottenham Hotspur (1)	2–2	Leeds United (3)	35,750
replay	Leeds United (3)	1–3	Tottenham Hotspur (1)	37,704

== Fifth round proper ==
The draw was conducted by Geoff Thomas and Stephanie Moore MBE on Sunday 24 January 2010 at Wembley Stadium. Fixtures took place over the weekend of 13 and 14 February 2010. Notts County from the Football League Two (4th tier) were the lowest-ranked team left at this stage, but they went out 4–0 to Premier League side Fulham.

Tie no	Home team	Score	Away team	Attendance
1	Crystal Palace (2)	2–2	Aston Villa (1)	20,486
replay	Aston Villa (1)	3–1	Crystal Palace (2)	31,874
2	Manchester City (1)	1–1	Stoke City (1)	28,019
replay	Stoke City (1)	3–1†	Manchester City (1)	21,813
3	Derby County (2)	1–2	Birmingham City (1)	21,043
4	Bolton Wanderers (1)	1–1	Tottenham Hotspur (1)	13,596
replay	Tottenham Hotspur (1)	4–0	Bolton Wanderers (1)	31,436
5	Chelsea (1)	4–1	Cardiff City (2)	40,827
6	Fulham (1)	4–0	Notts County (4)	16,132
7	Reading (2)	2–2	West Bromwich Albion (2)	18,008
replay	West Bromwich Albion (2)	2–3†	Reading (2)	13,985
8	Southampton (3)	1–4	Portsmouth (1)	31,385

† – After extra time

== Sixth round proper ==
The draw was conducted by former England striker Luther Blissett and TV presenter Tim Lovejoy on 14 February 2010 at Football Association headquarters at Wembley Stadium. Fixtures took place over the weekend of 6 and 7 March 2010. Reading from the Championship (2nd tier) were the lowest ranked team left at this stage.

7 March 2010	Chelsea (1)	2–0	Stoke City (1)	Stamford Bridge, London
16:00	Lampard 35'; Terry 67'	Report		Attendance: 41,322; Referee: Martin Atkinson (West Yorkshire)

6 March 2010	Fulham (1)	0–0	Tottenham Hotspur (1)	Craven Cottage, London
17:20		Report		Attendance: 24,533; Referee: Mark Clattenburg (County Durham)

24 March 2010 Replay	Tottenham Hotspur (1)	3–1	Fulham (1)	White Hart Lane, London
19:45	Bentley 47'; Pavlyuchenko 60'; Guðjohnsen 66'	Report	Zamora 17'	Attendance: 35,432; Referee: Martin Atkinson (West Yorkshire)

7 March 2010	Reading (2)	2–4	Aston Villa (1)	Madejski Stadium, Reading
13:45	Long 27', 42'	Report	A. Young 47'; Carew 51', 57', 90+3' (pen.)	Attendance: 23,175; Referee: Mike Dean (Cheshire)

6 March 2010	Portsmouth (1)	2–0	Birmingham City (1)	Fratton Park, Portsmouth
12:30	Piquionne 67', 70'	Report		Attendance: 20,456; Referee: Steve Bennett (Kent)

== Semi-finals ==
The draw was conducted by David Ginola and Jason Cundy at Wembley Stadium on Sunday, 7 March 2010. Both matches took place at Wembley Stadium over the weekend of 10 and 11 April.

10 April 2010	Aston Villa (1)	0–3	Chelsea (1)	Wembley Stadium, London
17:00		Report	Drogba 68'; Malouda 89'; Lampard 90+5'	Attendance: 81,869; Referee: Howard Webb (South Yorkshire)

11 April 2010	Tottenham Hotspur (1)	0–2 (a.e.t.)	Portsmouth (1)	Wembley Stadium, London
16:00		Report	Piquionne 99'; Boateng 117' (pen.)	Attendance: 84,602; Referee: Alan Wiley (Staffordshire)

== Final ==
The final was played on 15 May 2010 at Wembley Stadium, London

15 May 2010
15:00

Chelsea	1–0	Portsmouth
Drogba 59'; Lampard (penalty missed) 89	Report	Boateng (penalty missed) 54

Wembley Stadium, London
Attendance: 88,335
Referee: Chris Foy (Merseyside)

== Top scorers ==
Rank	Player	Club	Goals
1	(Norway) John Carew	Aston Villa	6
2	(Jamaica) Jermaine Beckford	Leeds United	5
2	(England) Jermain Defoe	Tottenham Hotspur	5
4	(Jamaica) Ricardo Fuller	Stoke City	4
4	(Scotland) Chris Martin	Norwich City	4
4	(Russia) Roman Pavlyuchenko	Tottenham Hotspur	4
4	(England) Daniel Sturridge	Chelsea	4

== Media coverage ==
In the United Kingdom, ITV were the sole network broadcasters for the season as subscription broadcasters Setanta Sports entered administration and ceased operations before the start of the season. S4C broadcast in Wales, The Football Association streamed select games live on its website for free.

The matches shown live on ITV were:

• Paulton Rovers 0–7 Norwich City (R1)

• Northwich Victoria 1–0 Charlton Athletic (R1)

• Rochdale 0–2 Luton Town (R1 Replay)

• Northwich Victoria 1–3 Lincoln City (R2)

• Kettering Town 1–1 Leeds United (R2)

• Leeds United 5–1 Kettering Town (R2 Replay)

• Reading 1–1 Liverpool (R3)

• Manchester United 0–1 Leeds United (R3)

• West Ham United 1–2 Arsenal (R3)

• Coventry City 1–2 Portsmouth (R3 Replay)

• Liverpool 1–2 Reading (R3 Replay)

• Preston North End 0–2 Chelsea (R4)

• Tottenham Hotspur 2–2 Leeds United (R4)

• Stoke City 3–1 Arsenal (R4)

• Scunthorpe United 2–4 Manchester City (R4)

• Crystal Palace 3–1 Wolverhampton Wanderers (R4 Replay)

• Leeds United 1–3 Tottenham Hotspur (R4 Replay)

• Southampton 1–4 Portsmouth (R5)

• Manchester City 1–1 Stoke City (R5)

• Bolton Wanderers 1–1 Tottenham Hotspur (R5)

• Crystal Palace 2–2 Aston Villa (R5)

• Stoke City 3–1 Manchester City (R5 Replay)

• Portsmouth 2–0 Birmingham City (QF)

• Fulham 0–0 Tottenham Hotspur (QF)

• Reading 2–4 Aston Villa (QF)

• Chelsea 2–0 Stoke City (QF)

• Tottenham Hotspur 3–1 Fulham (QF Replay)

• Aston Villa 0–3 Chelsea (SF)

• Tottenham Hotspur 0–2 Portsmouth (SF)

• Chelsea 1–0 Portsmouth (Final)

The matches shown live on S4C were:

• Bristol City 1–1 Cardiff City (R3)

• Cardiff City 1–0 Bristol City (R3 Replay)

• Chelsea 4–1 Cardiff City (R5)

The matches shown live on the website of The Football Association were:

• Oldham Athletic 0–2 Leeds United (R1)

• Millwall 4–1 AFC Wimbledon (R1)

• Stevenage 0–1 Port Vale (R1 Replay)

• Carlisle United 3–1 Norwich City (R2)

• Millwall 4–0 Staines Town (R2 Replay)

• Tranmere Rovers 0–1 Wolverhampton Wanderers (R3)

• Bristol City 1–1 Cardiff City (R3)

• Reading 1–0 Burnley (R4)

• Chelsea 4–1 Cardiff City (R5)

• Tottenham Hotspur 4–0 Bolton Wanderers (R5 Replay)

International broadcasters

Country	Broadcaster
Albania	Tring Sport
Belgium	Prime
Canada	Setanta Sports
France	France Télévisions
Italy	SKY Italia
