= Layla Young =

English footballer

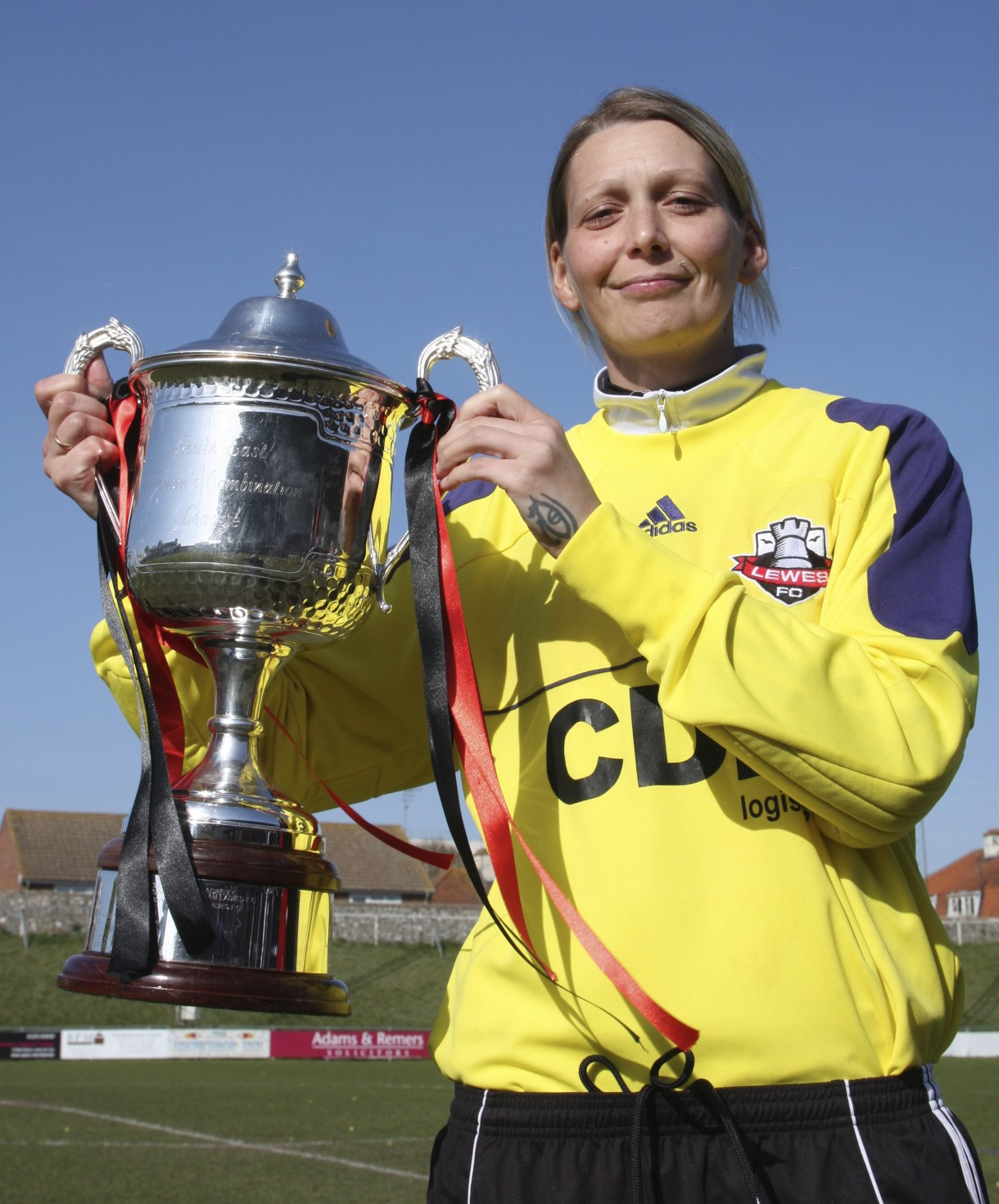
- Layla Young in 2012

Personal information
- Full name: Layla Young
- Date of birth: 29 January 1979 (age 47)
- Place of birth: England
- Position: Goalkeeper

Youth career
- Henfield FC
- Brighton & Hove Albion

College career
Years	Team	Apps	(Gls)
2000	University of Kansas	12	(0)

Senior career*
Years	Team	Apps	(Gls)
1999	New Hampshire Lady Phantoms		
2001	Fulham		
2001–2002	Brighton & Hove Albion		
2002–2004	Doncaster Rovers Belles		
2004–2005	Leeds United		
–2012	Lewes		

International career^{‡}
2000	England	1	(0)
- * Club domestic league appearances and goals ‡ National team caps and goals as of 11:13, 29 July 2011 (UTC)

Layla Young (born 29 January 1979) is an English former footballer. She most recently played as a goalkeeper for Lewes, having previously played at the top level for Fulham, Doncaster Belles and Leeds United. She also played at full international level for England.

== Club career ==
Originally from Bewbush in Crawley, Young represented Brighton & Hove Albion while still a student at Durham University, flying home every weekend to play with Albion. She later played for the University of Kansas in the USA.

In 1999 Young played for New Hampshire Lady Phantoms of the USL W-League under English coach Julie Hemsley, and was named team MVP.

== International career ==
Young represented England, playing once at international level. She made her senior debut in August 2000, in a 1–0 friendly defeat to France, before 50,000 spectators at Stade Vélodrome.

She was allotted 136 when the FA announced their legacy numbers scheme to honour the 50th anniversary of England’s inaugural international.
