= R.M.L.I. Gosport F.C. =

Former association football club in England

RMLI Gosport
- Full name: RMLI Gosport Football Club
- Nickname: Lillywhites
- Founded: circa 1900
- Dissolved: 1960
- Ground: Forton Army Barracks, Gosport
Home colours	Away colours

RMLI Gosport F.C. were a military football club based in Gosport, Hampshire who won the FA Amateur Cup in 1910. They were latterly known as Royal Marines Portsmouth.

== History ==
=== RMLI Gosport ===
The club were formed in the early 1900's as the football team of the Royal Marine Light Infantry - based at Forton Army Barracks in Gosport. During this time there were a number of short-lived regimental sides from the military playing in various local competitions, but they were the most successful.

RMLI Gosport joined the United Services Portmouth League and soon emerged as a force, winning the title three times. In 1908 they reached the Hampshire Senior Cup Final but lost 0–1 against Southampton Reserves at Fratton Park, Portsmouth in front of a 5,000 crowd.

Their most successful season was in 1909/10 when they won a famous cup double. RMLI Gosport won the Army Cup after a 2-0 victory against the 87th Royal Irish Fusiliers. The match was played at the Army Athletic Ground in Aldershot in front of 20,000 fans including the Prince and Princess of Wales with Princess Mary. After the game, the Commander organized a bicycle ride to rally Bandsmen living in the area so that the returning team would be properly greeted on their arrival back at Gosport railway station. The Marines then made the long journey to the North East to Bishop Auckland where they defeated South Bank 2–1 to win the FA Amateur Cup, this achievement was made more remarkable after progressing through nine rounds without playing a single home game. Crowds gathered in the streets to again welcome the victorious team home.

After the First World War, the team reformed and again won the United Services League title in 1921. There was another triumph a year later when they won the Hampshire Senior Cup - beating Bournemouth Poppies in the final (the score is not known). These successes led to them joining the Hampshire League for the 1922–23 campaign when they finished 6th in the County Division (later to be renamed Division 1). That season they again enjoyed a good county cup run, but lost a semi-final 0–2 against Thornycrofts (Woolston).

=== Royal Marines Portsmouth ===
In 1923 it was decided that the Royal Marines should become a single fighting force. It meant that the RMLI would amalgamate with the Royal Marine Artillery and just be known as the Royal Marines. Consequently, that year everything was transferred across to the Eastney Barracks in Portsmouth, thus ending the association with Forton, which then became a new home for the Royal Navy.

This saw RMLI Gosport merge with RMA Eastney (who had just reached the quarter finals of the FA Amateur Cup) to create Royal Marines Portsmouth and they remained in the Hampshire League until 1928. However, despite this they continued to enter the same cup competitions, and in 1930 reached another Hampshire Senior Cup final, losing 1-3 to Cowes at the The Dell, Southampton. In 1938 they returned to the county set-up and finished runners-up in Division 2 before the outbreak of the Second World War a year later. Despite numerous changes in personnel, the Marines still participated in war-time competitions and were twice beaten finalists in the Hampshire Senior Cup.

The post-war era saw success achieved in the Navy FA Cup, winning the competition on three occasions before disbanding.

A successor team called Royal Marines Eastney would later play throughout the sixties and seventies, winning the United Services League title twice and its cup once.

== Honours ==
- FA Amateur Cup
  - Winners 1909/10
- Army Cup
  - Winners 1909/10
- Navy Cup
  - Winners 1946/47, 1948/49 and 1956/57
- Hampshire Football Association
  - Senior Cup Winners 1921/22, Finalists 1907/08, 1929/30, 1940/41 and 1943/44
- Hampshire League
  - Division 2 Runners-up 1938/39
- United Services League
  - Champions 1906/07, 1907/08, 1908/09, 1912/13, 1920/21, 1938/39 and 1939/40
  - Charity Cup Winners 1907/08, 1910/11, 1922/23, 1923/24, 1927/28, 1939/40 and 1943/44.

== Playing records ==
=== Hampshire League ===
Season	Division	Position	Significant events
1922/23	County Division	6/17	
1923/24	County Division	6/16	Became Royal Marines Portsmouth
1924/25	County Division	4/16	
1925/26	County Division	11/16	
1926/27	County Division	11/16	
1927/28	County Division	13/16	Left competition
1922-38			
1938/39	Division 2	2/15	Runners-up

=== FA Cup ===
Season	Round	Opponents	Result
1925/26	Extra-Preliminary Round	H v East Cowes Victoria	W 3-1
	Preliminary Round	H v Gosport Athletic	W 2-0
	1st Qualifying Round	A v Gosport Albion	W 5-3
	2nd Qualifying Round	A v Southampton Civil Service	W 2-1
	3rd Qualifying Round	A v Salisbury City	L 1-4
1926/27	1st Qualifying Round	H v Ryde Sports	W 3-1
	2nd Qualifying Round	A v Portland United	W 4-3
	3rd Qualifying Round	H v Poole Town	D 2-2
	Replay	A v Poole Town	L 0-2
1927/28	Preliminary Round	A v Sandown	W 14-0
	1st Qualifying Round	H v Portsmouth Gas Co	W 3-1
	2nd Qualifying Round	H v Ryde Sports	D 1-1
	Replay	H v Ryde Sports	D 1-1
1928/29	1st Qualifying Round	H v Blandford United	W 2-0
	2nd Qualifying Round	A v RAOC Hilsea	L 0-1
1929/30	Preliminary Round	H Gosport	W 4-3
	1st Qualifying Round	H v Portsmouth Gas Co	W 3-0
	2nd Qualifying Round	A v Salisbury Corinthians	L 1-2
1933/34	Extra-Preliminary Round	H v Totton	D 0-0
	Replay	A v Totton	L 1-5
1934/35	Extra-Preliminary Round	A v Osborne Athletic	W 6-1
	Preliminary Round	A v Blandford United	L 1-3

=== FA Amateur Cup ===
Season	Round	Opponents	Result
1908/09	1st Qualifying Round	A v Ryde Sports	L 0-2
1909/10	1st Qualifying Round	A v 16th Company RGA	W 4-3
	2nd Qualifying Round	A v 37th Company RGA	W 4-0
	3rd Qualifying Round	A v RAMC Aldershot	W 2-1
	4th Qualifying Round	A v 2nd Scottish Rifles	W 2-0
	Round 1	A v Worthing	W 4-0
	Round 2	A v Bournemouth	W 3-1
	Round 3	A v Bromley	W 2-1
	Round 4	A v Custom House	W 2-0
	Semi-Final	N v Tufnell Park	W 4-0
	Final	N v South Bank	W 2-1
1910/11	Round 1	H v Dulwich Hamlet	L 0-2
1911/12	Round 1	A v 1st Kings Royal Rifles	L 1-5
1912/13	3rd Qualifying Round	A v 1st Heavy Brigade RGA	W 3-2
	4th Qualifying Round	A v Gosport United	W 5-1
	Round 1	A v 1st Loyal Lancs Regiment	D 1-1
	Replay	H v 1st Loyal Lancs Regiment	W 3-1
	Round 2	A v 1st Kings Royal Rifles	L 0-1
1913/14	2nd Qualifying Round	A v Southsea St Simons	W 3-1
	3rd Qualifying Round	H v HMS Excellent	W 3-2
	4th Qualifying Round	A v Portsmouth Amateurs	L 1-4
1919/20	2nd Qualifying Round	A v RMA Portsmouth	W 3-1
	3rd Qualifying Round	H v Portsmouth Amateurs	D 0-0
	Replay	H v Portsmouth Amateurs	W 2-0
	4th Qualifying Round	H v Bournemouth Tramways	W 2-1
	Round 1	A v Guildford City	W 4-3
	Round 2	H v Ilford	L 1-2
1920/21	Round 1	A v Gosport Athletic	W 3-2
	Round 2	H v Swindon Victoria	L 0-1
1921/22	Preliminary Round	A v Portsmouth Caledonians	W 3-0
	1st Qualifying Round	A v RGA Gosport	D 2-2
	Replay	H v RGA Gosport	W 3-1
	2nd Qualifying Round	A v Bournemouth	L 1-4
1922/23	1st Qualifying Round	H v Newport	W 6-0
	2nd Qualifying Round	A v RN Depot Portsmouth	W 4-1
	3rd Qualifying Round	H v RE Southampton	W 4-1
	4th Qualifying Round	A v HMS Excellent	L 1-3
1923/24	1st Qualifying Round	H v HMS Excellent	W 1-0
	2nd Qualifying Round	H v Southampton CS	W 1-0
	3rd Qualifying Round	H v RN Depot Portsmouth	W 2-1
	4th Qualifying Round	H v Gosport Athletic	W 1-0
	Round 1	A v Worthing	W 2-1
	Round 2	A v Nunhead	D 1-1
	Replay	H v Nunhead	D 1-1
	2nd Replay	N v Nunhead	W 2-1
	Round 3	A v Clapton	L 1-6
1924/25	Round 1	A v Bournemouth	W 5-3
	Round 2	A v Nunhead	L 0-2
1925/26	1st Qualifying Round	H v RAOC Portsmouth	W 5-1
	2nd Qualifying Round	H v Gosport Albion	W 5-2
	3rd Qualifying Round	A v 2nd Argyl & Sutherland Highlanders	L 0-3
1926/27	2nd Qualifying Round	H v Newport	W 3-0
	3rd Qualifying Round	H v 2nd Argyl & Sutherland Highlanders	W 2-0
	4th Qualifying Round	H v HMS Excellent	D 2-2
	Replay	A v HMS Excellent	L 1-2
1927/28	1st Qualifying Round	A v Lymington Town	W 5-4
	2nd Qualifying Round	H v RAOC Hilsea	W 4-2
	3rd Qualifying Round	A v Fareham	W 3-2
	4th Qualifying Round	A v HMS Excellent	D 0-0
	Replay	A v HMS Excellent	W 1-0
1928/29	1st Qualifying Round	H v Fareham	D 3-3
	Replay	A v Fareham	L 1-6
1929/30	1st Qualifying Round	H v Osborne Athletic	W 6-3
	2nd Qualifying Round	A v Dorchester Town	D 2-2
	Replay	H v Dorchester Town	W 3-0
	3rd Qualifying Round	A v Bournemouth Gasworks Athletic	L 2-3
1930/31	1st Qualifying Round	A v Fareham	L 0-2
1931/32	1st Qualifying Round	A v Dorchester Town	W 6-1
	2nd Qualifying Round	A v Bournemouth Gasworks Athletic	L 0-4
1932/33	1st Qualifying Round	H v Portsmouth Gas Co	L 2-6
1933/34	1st Qualifying Round	A v Poole Town	L 0-3
1934/35	1st Qualifying Round	H v RAOC Hilsea	L 1-3
1935/36	Preliminary Round	A v Totton	L 1-3

== Successor Club ==
The Royal Marines Football Association continues to run football teams for its bases and training centres across the country. The present day Portsmouth squad regularly participates in inter-service matches, combat cups, and the Royal Navy Inter-Regional/Inter-Command competitions. Players now also play for United Services Portsmouth F.C.
