= 28 Engineer Regiment (C-CBRN) =

Engineer regiment of the British Army

- Active: 1951–1957; 1971–2014; 2019–present
- Country: United Kingdom
- Branch: British Army
- Type: Regiment
- Role: C-CBRN regiment
- Part of: Royal Engineers
- Garrison/HQ: Rock Barracks, Suffolk and RAF Honington

28 Engineer Regiment (C-CBRN), Royal Engineers is a regiment of the British Army that focuses on countering chemical, biological, radiological and nuclear (C-CBRN) hazards in the environment. Its operational chain of command is 29 (Explosive Ordnance Disposal and Search) Group, under 8th Engineer Brigade as part of Allied Rapid Reaction Corps.

== History ==
28 Engineer Regiment was formed on 15 April 1951. It saw service in Benghazi, Libya and in Korea with the 1st Commonwealth Division in the Korean War. In 1956, 28 Engineer Regiment deployed to Christmas Island in support of the original Operation Grapple. The primary task of the regiment was the construction of the airfield and the 'Main-Camp', from which nuclear tests would be facilitated. In January 1957, on completion of their tasks in the Pacific Ocean, a letter was received from the War Office announcing the disbandment of the regiment and the subordination of its sub-units.

In 1971, the regiment was re-formed as 28 Amphibious Engineer Regiment, coming under operational control of Commander, Royal Engineers, I (BR) Corps in West Germany, and equipped with the M2 Amphibious Bridging Equipment.

In 1992, the regiment was re-organised under the Options for Change reforms. 28 Amphibious Engineer Regiment was re-roled as a general support regiment tasked with supporting the 1st Armoured Division with its amphibious commitment remaining but reduced to a single squadron (23 Amphibious Engineer Squadron). The regiment saw deployments to the former Republic of Yugoslavia, in 1995. It was also deployed on the initial invasion during Operation Telic, Iraq in 2003.

Before the initial Army 2020 changes, the regiment was re-roled as a close support engineer regiment, attached to the 11th Light Brigade. In 2014 the unit was disbanded as a result of the Army 2020 reforms.

=== Reformation ===
The regiment reformed on 1 April 2019 as a counter-chemical, biological, radiological and nuclear (C-CBRN) regiment with dismounted RE elements to be based at Rock Barracks in Woodbridge, Suffolk, whilst mounted RTR elements remain in Harman Lines, Warminster, Wiltshire.

The sub-units of 28 Engineer Regiment (C-CBRN) are:

- 64 Headquarters & Support Squadron (C-CBRN), Royal Engineers, at RAF Honington
- Falcon Area Surveillance and Reconnaissance Squadron, Royal Tank Regiment, at Harman Lines, Warminster Garrison
- 42 Field Squadron (C-CBRN), Royal Engineers, at Rock Barracks, Woodbridge
- 77 Field Squadron (C-CBRN), Royal Engineers, at Rock Barracks, Woodbridge

== The regimental emblem ==
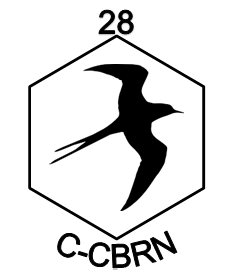
Regimental emblem featuring benzene ring and frigate bird.

The emblem on the 28 Engineer Regiment flag is a Christmas Island Frigatebird emblazoned on a hexagon. The hexagon was used as an emblem by a number of Royal Engineer Special Warfare Groups in WW1, and draws inspiration from the chemical diagram for the benzene ring, a chemical structure found in a large number of chemical warfare agents. The hexagon remains part of the symbology and iconography adorning identifying badges and emblems of CBRN units and organisations of many NATO partners.

The Christmas Island Frigatebird is endemic to the Christmas Islands and was the motif for the original Operation Grapple on which 28 Engineer Regiment deployed.
