= FA Council =

The FA Council consists of 92 elected representatives, from the FA Premier League, the Football League, County FAs, and the non-executive board of The Football Association. The council meets to decide the major policies of The FA, which is the governing body of English football.

== Members of the FA Council ==
- President
- Chairman
- Vice-chairman
- Life vice-presidents
- Vice-presidents
- Divisional representatives
- County Football Association representatives
- Representatives of The FA Premier League
- Representatives of The Football League

== Controversy ==
The British Government expressed concern in 2016 over the governance of the FA, which receives £30 million p.a. public funding, as only eight women and four black and ethnic minorities are on the 122 strong FA Council. A proposal for reform was tabled in February 2017 by Greg Clarke, Chairman of the FA. Mr Clarke has threatened to resign if his reform proposals are not accepted.
