= Royal Air Force Football Association =

Governing body of football within the Royal Air Force

- Royal Air Force FA logo
- Formation: 1920
- Purpose: Football association
- Headquarters: RAF Brize Norton
- Location: Carterton, Oxford
- Coordinates: 51.762168°N 1.577885°W
- President: Air Marshal Sir Stephen Hillier KCB CBE DFC RAF
- Website: www.royalairforcefa.com

The Royal Air Force Football Association, also known as the RAF FA, is the governing body of football within the Royal Air Force.

== RAF Challenge Cup ==
The RAF Challenge Cup, held since 1920, is the foremost football cup competition for teams affiliated to the RAF FA. As of 2024, the current holders are RAF Brize Norton, making them the most successful team in the competition with seven wins since its inception.

The competition has been held annually since its inception in 1920, with one exception, from 1939 to 1948 due to World War II and its aftermath.

=== Winners ===
Season	Winners (Number of wins.)
1920–21	RAF Cranwell (1)
1921–22	RAF Henlow (1)
1922–23	RAF Cranwell (2)
1923–24	RAF Manston (1)
1924–25	RAF Cranwell (3)
1925–26	RAF Flowerdown (1)
1926–27	RAF Martlesham Heath (1)
1927–28	RAF Eastchurch (1)
1928–29	RAF Henlow (2)
1929–30	RAF Henlow (3)
1930–31	RAF Martlesham Heath (2)
1931–32	RAF Boscombe Down (1)
1932–33	RAF Martlesham Heath (3)
1933–34	RAF Henlow (4)
1934–35	RAF Upper Heyford (1)
1935–36	RAF Leuchars (1)
1936–37	RAF Cranwell (4)
1937–38	RAF Manston (2)
1938–39	RAF Shawbury (1)
1948–49	RAF Halton (1)
1949–50	RAF Halton (2)
1950–51	RAF Cosford (1)
1951–52	RAF St Mawgan (1)
1952–53	RAF Cosford (1)
1953–54	RAF Innsworth (1)
1954–55	RAF Kinloss (1)
1955–56	RAF Melksham (1)
1956–57	RAF Innsworth (2)
1957–58	RAF Kirkham (1)
1958–59	RAF High Wycombe (1)
1959–60	RAF Melksham (2)
1960–61	RAF Yatesbury (1)
1961–62	RAF Cranwell (5)
1962–63	RAF Yatesbury (2)
1963–64	RAF Ballykelly (1)
1964–65	RAF Finningley (1)
1965–66	RAF Benson (1)
1966–67	RAF Finningley (2)
1967–68	RAF Scampton (1)
1968–69	RAF Waddington (1)
1969–70	RAF Scampton (2)
1970–71	RAF Marham (1)
1971–72	RAF Thorney Island (1)
1972–73	RAF Kinloss (2)
1973–74	RAF Lyneham (1)
1974–75	RAF Lyneham (2)
1975–76	RAF Henlow (5)
1976–77	RAF Lyneham (3)
1977–78	RAF Brize Norton (1)
1978–79	RAF Wattisham (1)
1979–80	RAF Brize Norton (2)
1980–81	RAF Marham (2)
1981–82	RAF Brize Norton (3)
1982–83	RAF Wyton (1)
1983–84	RAF Wyton (2)
1984–85	RAF Abingdon (1)
1985–86	RAF Brize Norton (4)
1986–87	RAF Kinloss (3)
1987–88	RAF Locking (1)
1988–89	RAF Wyton (3)
1989–90	RAF Brize Norton (5)
1990–91	RAF St Athan (1)
1991–92	RAF Lyneham (4)
1992–93	RAF Coningsby (1)
1993–94	RAF Kinloss (4)
1994–95	RAF Waddington (1)
1995–96	RAF Coltishall (1)
1996–97	RAF Bruggen (1)
1997–98	RAF Leeming (1)
1998–99	RAF Bruggen (2)
1999–00	RAF Boulmer (1)
2000–01	RAF Leeming (2)
2001–02	RAF Leeming (3)
2002–03	RAF Marham (3)
2003–04	RAF Lyneham (5)
2004–05	RAF Lyneham (6)
2005–06	RAF Leeming (4)
2006–07	RAF Coningsby (2)
2007–08	RAF Wittering (1)
2008–09	RAF Cosford (2)
2009–10	RAF Cosford (3)
2010–11	RAF Wittering (2)
2011–12	RAF Cosford (4)
2012–13	RAF Coningsby (3)
2013–14	RAF Benson (2)
2014–15	RAF Waddington (2)
2015–16	RAF Marham (4)
2016–17	RAF Honington (1)
2017–18	RAF Coningsby (4)
2018–19	RAF Brize Norton (6)
2019–20	RAF Odiham (1)
2020–21	RAF Honington (2)
2021–22	RAF Cosford (5)
2022–23	RAF Boulmer (2)
2023–24	RAF Brize Norton (7)

== See also ==
- Army Football Association
- Royal Marines Football Association
- Royal Navy Football Association
