= Royal Navy Football Association =

FA
- Founded: 1904
- Website: www.royalnavyfa.com

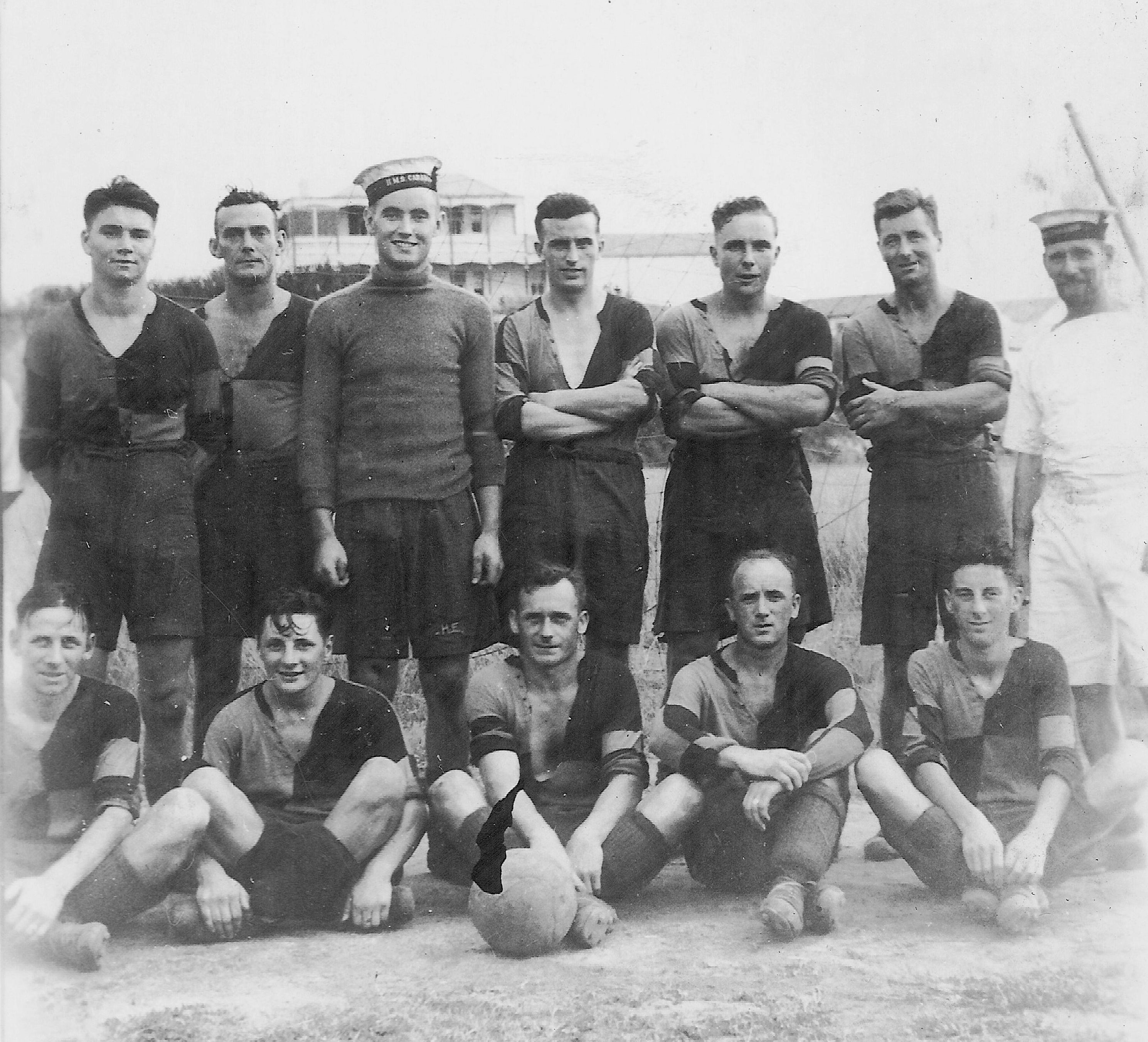
HMS Caradoc football team on Moresby Plain at the Royal Naval Dockyard in Bermuda, circa 1928

The Royal Navy Football Association, also simply known as the Royal Navy FA, is the governing body of football for the Royal Navy.

== Royal Navy Cup ==
The Royal Navy Cup is the foremost football cup competition for teams affiliated to the Royal Navy FA.

== See also ==
- Royal Marines Football Association
