= Malta national amateur football team =

Malta
- Association: Malta Football Association
- Confederation: UEFA (Europe)
- Head coach: Alfred Attard
- FIFA code: MLT

UEFA Regions' Cup
- Appearances: 8 (first in 2001)

The Malta national amateur football team is the amateur representative team for Malta at football. It is controlled by the Malta Football Association.

== History ==
The team's first reported appearance came at the 1960 Summer Olympics African qualifiers, where Malta was eliminated in the first round. Subsequently, the team also participated in the 1963 Mediterranean Games and in two editions of the now defunct UEFA Amateur Cup.

The team also faced Canada in September 1973 in a friendly match at the Empire Stadium, as part of the Canada's preparation for the 1976 Summer Olympics. The match ended in a nil-nil draw.

Nowadays, it alternates with Gozo representative football team in representing Malta in the UEFA Regions' Cup. It debuted in the 2001 and has since participated in the 2003, 2005, 2007, 2009 and 2011. Moreover, following a hiatus of 11 years due to the combination of the participation by the Gozitan team and the COVID-19 pandemic, the team returned to the fore and participated in the 2023 edition of the UEFA Regions' Cup.

== Tournament records ==
=== UEFA Amateur Cup ===
Year	Round	GP	W	D	L	GF	GA
(Spain) 1967	Did not enter						
(Italy) 1970	Qualifying	4	1	1	2	2	10
(Socialist Federal Republic of Yugoslavia) 1974	Qualifying	4	0	0	4	0	12
(Greece) 1978	Did not enter						
Total	2/4	8	1	1	6	2	22

=== UEFA Regions Cup ===
Year	Round	GP	W	D	L	GF	GA
(Italy) 1999	Did not enter						
(Czech Republic) 2001	Preliminary	2	0	0	2	0	6
(Italy) 2003	Preliminary	3	0	0	3	1	9
(Spain) 2005	Preliminary	3	1	0	2	2	9
(Poland) 2007	Intermediary	3	0	0	3	0	31
(Spain) 2009	Intermediary	6	4	0	2	10	7
(Portugal) 2011	Intermediary	3	0	1	2	0	7
(Italy) 2013	Did not enter						
(Republic of Ireland) 2015	Did not enter						
(Turkey) 2017	Did not enter						
(Germany) 2019	Did not enter						
2021	Cancelled due to COVID-19 pandemic						
(Spain) 2023	Intermediary	3	1	0	2	4	5
(San Marino) 2025	Did not enter						
2027	Intermediary	3	0	0	3	1	14
Total		26	6	1	19	18	88

== Tournament performances ==
=== 2001 UEFA Regions' Cup ===
==== Preliminary ====
Team	Pld	W	D	L	GF	GA	GD	Pts
(Croatia) Dalmatia	2	2	0	0	2	0	+2	6
(Italy) Abruzzo	2	1	0	1	5	1	+4	3
Malta (H)	2	0	0	2	0	6	−6	0
Israel	withdrew							

==== Results ====
7 December 2000 2001 UEFA Regions' Cup, Preliminary Round	Malta	0–1	(Croatia) Dalmatia	Ta' Qali, Malta
		[ Report]	Bjelos 90+' (pen.)	Stadium: Centenary Stadium

9 December 2000 2001 UEFA Regions' Cup, Preliminary Round	Malta	0–5	(Italy) Abruzzo	Ta' Qali, Malta
		[ Report]	Maggiore 18', 59'; Aureli 30'; Castellano; Pilone 80'	Stadium: Centenary Stadium

==== Squad ====
The following 18 players were called up for the 2001 UEFA Regions' Cup by coach Horst Heese.

Position	Players
Goalkeepers	Jason Cordina (Marsa), Paul Psaila (Luqa St. Andrew's)
Defenders	Kevin Attard (Mqabba), Jeffrey Fenech (Pembroke Athleta), Stephen Micallef (Mġarr United), Robert Sammut (Lija Athletic), Heathcliff Schembri (St. George's), Johann Zammit (Marsa)
Midfielders	Dino Cachia (Msida St. Joseph), Paul Camilleri (Birżebbuġa St. Peter's), Gordon Chetcuti (Sirens), Donald Gatt (Marsa), Stefan Farrugia (Marsaxlokk), Clive Formosa (Birżebbuġa St. Peter's), Mark Tanti (St. George's)
Forwards	Alistair Camilleri (Kirkop United), Joe Sapiano (Dingli Swallows), Alan Spiteri (San Ġwann)

=== 2003 UEFA Regions' Cup ===
==== Preliminary ====
Team	Pld	W	D	L	GF	GA	GD	Pts
(Netherlands) District Noord (H)	3	3	0	0	6	2	+4	9
(Portugal) Algarve	3	2	0	1	5	2	+3	6
Northern Ireland	3	1	0	2	4	3	+1	3
Malta	3	0	0	3	1	9	−9	0

=== 2005 UEFA Regions' Cup ===
==== Preliminary ====
Team	Pld	W	D	L	GF	GA	GD	Pts
(England) Mid-Cheshire	3	2	1	0	8	1	+7	7
Northern Ireland	3	1	1	1	6	3	+3	4
(Slovenia) Primorska (H)	3	1	0	2	5	8	−3	3
Malta	3	1	0	2	2	9	−7	3

=== 2007 UEFA Regions' Cup ===
==== Intermediary ====
Team	Pld	W	D	L	GF	GA	GD	Pts
(Poland) Lower Silesia (H)	3	2	1	0	14	2	+12	7
(Italy) Tuscany	3	2	0	1	11	2	+9	6
(Germany) Saxony	3	1	1	1	12	2	+10	4
Malta	3	0	0	3	0	31	−31	0

=== 2009 UEFA Regions' Cup ===
==== Preliminary ====
Team	Pld	W	D	L	GF	GA	GD	Pts
Malta	3	3	0	0	6	0	+6	9
(Israel) Maccabi Tzur Shalom (H)	3	2	0	1	6	2	+4	6
(Czech Republic) South Bohemia	3	1	0	2	4	8	−4	3
(Wales) Gwent	3	0	0	3	4	10	−6	0

==== Intermediary ====
Team	Pld	W	D	L	GF	GA	GD	Pts
(Belgium) Kempen	3	2	0	1	4	2	+2	6
(Germany) Lower Rhine (H)	3	1	1	1	5	4	+1	4
(Northern Ireland) Eastern Region	3	1	1	1	3	3	0	4
Malta	3	1	0	2	4	7	−3	3

=== 2011 UEFA Regions' Cup ===
==== Intermediary ====
Team	Pld	W	D	L	GF	GA	GD	Pts
(Germany) Württemberg	3	2	1	0	16	2	+14	7
(Spain) Galicia	3	2	1	0	10	2	+ 8	7
Malta (H)	3	0	1	2	0	7	7	1
(Greece) Phthiotis	3	0	1	2	2	17	-15	1

==== Results ====
7 December 2010 2011 UEFA Regions' Cup, Intermediary Round	Malta	0–1	(Germany) Württemberg	Ta' Qali, Malta
		Report	Molinari 40'	Stadium: Centenary Stadium; Referee: David Malcolm (Northern Ireland)

9 December 2010 2011 UEFA Regions' Cup, Intermediary Round	Malta	0–0	(Greece) Phthiotis	Ta' Qali, Malta
		Report		Stadium: Centenary Stadium; Referee: Pavle Radovanovic (Macedonia)

11 December 2010 2011 UEFA Regions' Cup, Intermediary Round	Galicia (Spain)	6–0	Malta	Ta' Qali, Malta
	Rey-Cabarcos 15' (pen.); Rodriguez 18', 30', 65', 73'; Souto 38'	Report		Stadium: Centenary Stadium; Referee: Pavle Radovanovic (Macedonia)

==== Squad ====
The following 18 players were called up for the 2011 UEFA Regions' Cup by coach Edwin Camilleri.

Position	Players
Goalkeepers	Noel Attard (Mosta), Julian Azzopardi (Żurrieq)
Defenders	Bjorn Bondin (Balzan Youths), Adrian Borg (Mosta), William Camilleri (St. Andrews), Alex Cini (Mosta), George Gribbon (Melita), Andy Mangion (San Gwann), Kane William Micallef (Melita)
Midfielders	Aaron Agius (Balzan Youths), Jonathan Briscoe White (St. Andrews), Mark Camilleri (Siġġiewi), Luke Micallef (Melita), Julian Galea (Melita)
Forwards	Ronnie Celeste (Birżebbuġa St. Peter's), Lyden Micallef (Mosta), Chris Pace (Naxxar Lions), Josef Vassallo (Siġġiewi)

=== 2023 UEFA Regions' Cup ===
==== Intermediary ====
Pos	Team	Pld	W	D	L	GF	GA	GD	Pts	Qualification
1	(Serbia) Belgrade	2	1	1	0	7	1	+6	4	Final tournament
2	(Croatia) Split Region (H)	2	1	1	0	6	2	+4	4	
3	Malta	3	1	0	2	4	5	−1	3	
4	(Ukraine) Ivano-Frankivsk Oblast	3	0	0	3	0	9	−9	0	

Source: UEFA
Rules for classification: Tiebreakers
(H) Hosts

==== Results ====
28 September 2022 2023 UEFA Regions' Cup, Intermediary Round	Split Region (Croatia)	2–1	Malta	Dugopolje, Croatia
16:30	Škarić 7'; Andrić 41'	Report	Cutajar 65' (pen.)	Stadium: Stadion Hrvatski vitezovi Referee: Nikola Popov (Bulgaria)

1 October 2022 2023 UEFA Regions' Cup, Intermediary Round	Ivano-Frankivsk (Ukraine)	0–3 w/o	Malta	Dugopolje, Croatia
16:30		Report		Stadium: Stadion Hrvatski vitezovi

4 October 2022 2023 UEFA Regions' Cup, Intermediary Round	Malta	0–3	(Serbia) Belgrade	Zadar, Croatia
16:30		Report	Šarić 50'; Gavrilović 62'; Vuković 71' (pen.)	Stadium: Stanovi Stadium; Referee: Jonathan Lardot (Belgium)

=== Group 8 ===
Pos	Team	Pld	W	D	L	GF	GA	GD	Pts	Qualification
1	(Republic of Ireland) Munster (H)	3	2	0	1	12	3	+9	6 (Note: Tied on head-to-head points, ranked on head-to-head goal difference: Munster: +1, Uzda Region: 0, Split: –1)	Final tournament
2	(Belarus) Uzda Region	3	2	0	1	7	4	+3	6	
3	(Croatia) Split	3	2	0	1	5	4	+1	6	
4	Malta	3	0	0	3	1	14	−13	0	

Source: UEFA
Rules for classification: Tiebreakers
(H) Hosts
Notes:

1 November 2026	Split (Croatia)	2–0	Malta	Knockgriffin Park, Midleton
15:00	Bjeliš 56'; Prizmić 90+2'	Report		Referee: Aaron Wyn Jones (Wales)

4 November 2026	Munster (Republic of Ireland)	8–0	Malta	Turners Cross Stadium, Cork
20:30	Kilgannon 2', 70'; Crowley 14', 89', 90+2' (pen.); Tamen 45'; Hayes 54'; Abela 64' (o.g.)	Report		Referee: Ioannis Christodoulou (Cyprus)

7 November 2026	Malta	1–4	(Belarus) Uzda Region	Knockgriffin Park, Midleton
16:00	Cassar 41'	Report	Baranau 7', 28'; Montewka 11'; Karaliou 63'	Referee: Vilhjalmur Thorarinsson (Iceland)

==== Squad ====
The following 18 players were called up for the 2023 UEFA Regions' Cup by coach Alfred Attard.

Position	Players
Goalkeepers	Leon Seisun (Għaxaq), Jonathan Grech (Żabbar St. Patrick)
Defenders	Gianluca Bugeja (Marsa), Dylan Micallef (Marsa), Andrea Azzopardi (Żurrieq), Daniel Sant (captain) (Lija Athletic), Ian Montanaro (Marsa), Ismael Colombo (Marsascala)
Midfielders	Josuel Spiteri (Marsascala), Shalon Diacono (Żabbar St. Patrick), Samuel Buhagiar (Fgura United), Damon Hili (Victoria Hotspurs ( (Gozo) ), Josmar Galea (Marsascala), Ryan Dalli (Mgarr United), Thomas Giles (Lija Athletic)
Forwards	Saturday Nanapere (Mgarr United), Nicholas Schembri (Attard), Andre Joe Cutajar (Żabbar St. Patrick)

== See also ==
- UEFA Regions' Cup
- Gozo representative football team
