= Scottish Amateur Football Association =

- Founded: 1909
- Country: Scotland
- Confederation: UEFA
- Level on pyramid: N/A
- Promotion to: None
- Relegation to: None
- Domestic cup: Scottish Amateur Cup
- Website: Official website

The Scottish Amateur Football Association (SAFA) is the organising body for amateur football across Scotland. An affiliate of the Scottish Football Association, the SAFA has in turn 50 regional associations affiliated to it and some 67 different league competitions organised by these associations. There is estimated to be over 35,000 amateur footballers in Scotland, and all of their competitions are co-ordinated at some level by the Scottish Amateur Football Association. The SAFA was formed in 1909 with the purpose of legislating for and fostering the amateur level of football in Scotland.

== History ==
The Scottish Amateur Football Association (SAFA) was formed in 1909. After an initial meeting held in February, attended by 80 clubs from throughout Scotland, Queen's Park, Glasgow & District FP Football League and the Glasgow & District Secondary Schools League met and agreed on the Association's formation. James Allison, President of Queens Park FC, took the chair. The first office bearers were appointed in January 1910. On 28 May 1909, the Scottish Football Association (SFA) discussed a request for membership to the body from the SAFA. This was referred to the Special Committee who reported back in November of that year that a decision would be deferred until a full list of SAFA member clubs was submitted for approval. At this time five SAFA clubs had applied for direct membership of the SFA. It was not at all unusual to have joint membership as it permitted clubs to participate in competitions organised by the SFA. At a meeting on 14 December 1909, the SFA approved the membership of the SAFA.

The SAFA AGM in May 1914 reported three Associations and thirty two clubs in membership, and the Treasurer advised the Association was £21 in credit. The first round of the Scottish Cup was set for 16 January 1915, but amateur football literally stopped for the duration of the war. In October 1917, the SAFA advised the SFA that it was dormant as it had only one club in membership. At the May 1919 AGM, there were three Associations and 43 clubs in membership. By October 1919, 23 new clubs had entered the Association though five others had dropped out.

In December 1926, the SFA announced that they would be altering their Articles of Association. This meant that, from season 1927–28, the Scottish Junior Football Association (SJFA) and the SAFA were to be National Associations affiliated to the SFA. Each Association would be given a vote at SFA Council Meetings and the SFA was to set up an Appeals Committee to deal with appeals from each body.

Due to the outbreak of the Second World War in September 1939, the SFA declared all football in Scotland be suspended but minor associations could continue. During the war years an Emergency Committee was formed to run the SAFA affairs. By 1943, 12 Associations/Leagues had rejoined the SAFA including Lothian AFA, the Scottish Amateur Football League, the West of Scotland AFA, and 98 teams entered a "West Cup". The 1945 AGM attracted only 14 Associations/Leagues and was not quorate though by July that year it was agreed to restart Scottish and District Cups together with the under-18 and under-16 national competitions.

Immediately after the war, most Leagues and Associations struggled to resurrect and made stuttering progress caused by loss of personnel, lack of equipment and kit, problems due to travel, effects of rationing. The SAFA AGM of 1946 saw 37 delegates attend and there were 126 entries for the Scottish Cup. The 1950 AGM saw membership rise to 58 Associations/ Leagues with 822 clubs and 242 Youth teams. A record 259 entries for the Scottish Cup in 1962 was exceeded in 1965 when 284 entered. At the 1970 AGM, there were 61 Associations/Leagues and 1,100 clubs in membership, while there were 413 entries for the Scottish Amateur Cup and the Association funds stood at £3,694.75.

Throughout the 1980s the SAFA grew at a great pace, and at the end of the decade it had 150 Associations/Leagues with 2,950 clubs and 3,700 teams. Between 1975 and 1983 the Association had doubled in size. This growth was due in the main to the popularity of Sunday football and the rapid growth of youth football. The Scottish Cup entries had reached 802, with 650 for the Famous Grouse Scotch Whisky Amateur Football Trophy.

The 100th year (2008–09) started with an entry of 598 teams for the Scottish Amateur Cup, despite falling numbers still the largest football competition in the country and continued on a bright financial note when a sponsorship agreement was signed with Scottish Brewers, using the brand name Fosters, for the Scottish Amateur Cup and the Scottish Amateur Sunday Trophy for a two-year period with an option for a further year.

== Amateur international team ==
In November 1910, the SAFA asked the permission of the SFA to play an international match against England only to be told their request was premature. When the SAFA endeavoured to arrange a meeting with the SFA to discuss the matter, this was refused. In November 1912, the SAFA again requested permission to play an international match against England and were again turned down. The SFA advised the SAFA that in future if there were to be such a game, it would be under their jurisdiction. In March 1913, the SAFA requested the permission of the SFA to play teams on the continent. This was agreed to provided they played teams in membership of FIFA and all details were submitted to the SFA for approval. The SFA tried to arrange a game against England for December 1913, but this date was changed several times and then abandoned due to the outbreak of the First World War in 1914.

In May 1919, the (English) Football Association (FA) asked the SFA to play the elusive first international amateur match in the following season, but they had to decline as Queen's Park refused to release their first team players. In March 1922, the SFA turned down the offer of an amateur international fixture against France and a further approach from the FA was met with a similar response. In April 1924, the SAFA again asked to play an international match against England, only to be told that a team without Queen's Park players was not in the national interest.

However the SAFA agreed in August 1926 that an amateur international match would take place against England on 18 December 1926 in Leicester. The Scottish team consisted of seven Queens Park players, one from the Army and the other three from English senior teams. Scotland won 4–1 and the expenses came to £291.19.2 (£291,97). The second international match against England took place in May 1928, with Scotland winning 3–2 and showing a profit of £446.7.0 (£446.35). On this occasion there were eight Queens Park players, two anglos and I McDonald from Murrayfield Amateurs in the team. In early 1929, the SAFA asked the SFA if they could play internationals against Ireland and Wales, and these went ahead in October 1929, when Scotland beat Ireland 3–0, and in February 1930, when Wales were defeated 1–0.

In 1932 the SAFA were invited to have two representatives on the SFA Selection Committee and dates for the internationals against the three other home countries were established. The SFA decided that the players who represented their country would receive a gold medal. R Gillespie of Queens Park, who had captained Scotland in the historic first amateur international against England, was once again selected for the forthcoming international and was also capped and captained Scotland in the full international against France later that year.

The SAFA played the (English) Northern League and Northern Ireland (in Belfast) in 1947. The SAFA applied to the SFA to resume internationals against England and Wales but were refused on the grounds of "not full strength teams" and "a team without Queen's Park players would be deluding the public". The SAFA were again granted permission to play Northern League and Northern Ireland (in Dumfries) in May 1948. In an about turn by the SFA, the SAFA were told they could arrange future internationals against the other home countries. The SAFA arranged its first amateur international against Ireland in Aberdeen. There were seven Queen's Park players in the team, but there was no happy ending to the first international match as Scotland were defeated.

In 1949 the SAFA received an invitation to play their French counterparts in Paris the following year but had to decline the offer as they could not afford to finance the trip nor could the players take the necessary five days off work to participate. In 1952, the SFA turned down a request from the SAFA to permit the televising of the amateur international v England. A first international match v Éire was arranged for Dublin in May 1953, with a return at Celtic Park the following year. In 1954 the SFA again resumed responsibility for amateur internationals.

== UEFA Regions' Cup ==
Since 1999, the SAFA has provided a representative team to compete for Scotland in the biennial UEFA Regions' Cup for amateur footballers. This is usually made up of a squad from member clubs in one or more of the stronger regional leagues such as the Central Scottish AFL. Scotland do not have a strong record in the tournament, having never reached the Final tournament (last eight), although the quantity and quality of players available to the selectors is arguably lower than some other Regions' Cup entrants due to the unusual way non-professional football is organised in the country, whereby the many players involved in the game at Junior level are not considered for the amateur squads.

=== Progress ===
Year	Round	GP	W	D	L	GS	GA
1999 (Note: Represented by West Scotland.)	Qualifying Round (Republic of Ireland)	3	1	0	2	2	5
2001 (Note: Represented by Central Scotland.)	Qualifying Round (Luxembourg)	3	1	1	1	5	8
2003	Qualifying Round (Sweden)	3	0	1	2	1	9
2005 (Note: Represented by Highland and Islands.)	Qualifying Round (France)	3	0	0	3	0	10
2007	Qualifying Round (Northern Ireland)	3	1	1	1	5	3
2009 (Note: Represented by East of Scotland.)	Intermediate Round (Italy)	3	0	0	3	2	11
2011 (Note: Represented by EWC Scotland.)	Intermediate Round (Portugal)	3	1	0	2	4	8
2013 (Note: Represented by West Central Scotland.)	Intermediate Round (Czech Republic)	3	0	0	3	5	16
2015 (Note: Represented by East, West and Central Scotland.)	Intermediate Round (Slovakia)	6	1	1	4	4	8
2017 (Note: Represented by East West Central Scotland.)	Intermediate Round (Malta)	6	3	1	2	16	8
2019	Preliminary Round (Slovenia)	3	0	2	1	5	6
2021	Did not enter / tournament cancelled						
2023	Intermediate Round (Bosnia and Herzegovina)	3	1	1	1	5	9
	Total	42	9	8	25	54	101

== Amateur Cup ==
In February 1910, the SAFA asked the SFA to donate a Challenge Cup and badges (winners' medals) for annual competition, but in early March of that year the SFA advised the SAFA they understood that some of their member clubs had registered professional players and they must be investigated. Three clubs were expelled from the SAFA, and on 30 March 1910, the SFA agreed to present a cup to the value of £20 and the secretary was asked to obtain quotations for the design and cost. The cup was finally presented to the SAFA on 27 May 1910, to be known as the Scottish Amateur Cup.

Regardless of the outcome of the request to the SFA, the SAFA proceeded with a national cup competition. Twenty-three teams entered the first ever Scottish Amateur Cup competition in 1910. The competition got off to an inauspicious start when Kilmacolm protested about the ground conditions at their first round tie against Paisley Grammar School. The tie was replayed the following week with Paisley Grammar School winning. The first winners were John Neilson Institution FP AFC who defeated Paisley Academicals by 2–0 at Love Street Paisley in April 1910. No cup or medals were presented after the final. The cup was eventually presented to the winning side in December 1911 and the SAFA had specially commissioned solid gold badges presented to the winners. One of the teams, Vale of Atholl, current members of the Perthshire Amateur Football Association, are still in existence.

The Amateur Cup trophy was replaced by a replica in 2005, purchased by the SAFA at a cost of £13,550. The original was placed on permanent exhibit in the Scottish Football Museum at Hampden Park. The Amateur Cup is open for competition annually by all member clubs within the SAFA.

== The Scottish Amateur Sunday Trophy ==
Presented by the SAFA to replace the Famous Grouse Scotch Whisky Amateur Football Trophy in 2005 at a cost of £1,675. Established in 2005 and competed for annually by teams in the Associations/Leagues affiliated to the SAFA who play Sunday football.

Season	Winners
2004–05	Cavendish A.F.C.
2005–06	Rowantree A.F.C.
2006–07	Finnart A.F.C.
2007–08	Finnart A.F.C.
2008–09	Gantry A.F.C.
2009–10	Finnart A.F.C.
2010–11	Tower A.F.C.
2011–12	Finnart A.F.C.
2012–13	Rutherglen Vogue A.F.C.
2013–14	Harvester A.F.C.
2014–15	Cranhill United A.F.C.
2015–16	Dundee Argyle A.F.C.
2016–17	Harvester A.F.C.
2017–18	Drumchapel United A.F.C.
2018-19	Castlemilk Dynamo A.F.C
2019-20	Bullwood A.F.C (Played in 2022)
2020-21	(NO COMPETITION COVID 19)
2021-22	FC Pather A.F.C
2022-23	Edinburgh East A.F.C
2023-24	Westside A.F.C
2024-25	Ferniebahce Thistle A.F.C
2025-26	Caledonian Spartans A.F.C
