= Northern Ireland national junior football team =

Northern Ireland Juniors
- Nickname(s): Green and White Army, Norn Iron
- Association: Irish Football Association
- Confederation: UEFA (Europe)
- Head coach: Harry McConkey
- Captain: William Armstrong
- Most caps: Brian Hylands (25)
- Home stadium: various
- FIFA code: NIR
First colours	Second colours

First international
- Ireland 0–11 Scotland (Glasgow; 15 February 1890)

Biggest win
- Northern Ireland 5–0 Luxembourg (Luxembourg; 1 October 2000)

Biggest defeat
- Ireland 0–11 Scotland (Glasgow; 15 February 1890)

UEFA Regions Cup
- Appearances: 2 (first in 2007)
- Best result: Finals Group Stage

The Northern Ireland Junior national football team, commonly referred to as Northern Ireland Juniors, represents Northern Ireland in international association football matches for teams selected outside national professional leagues. Originally selected on an all-Ireland basis, the team is now limited to selecting players appearing in intermediate and junior leagues within Northern Ireland. A number of players have graduated from the Junior international side to the senior international side, notably Norman Uprichard and Dick Keith who played at the 1958 World Cup. The most recent player to graduate to the senior team was Stuart Dallas.

== History ==
Ireland Juniors played their first representative match against Scotland in 1890. The Scots became the primary opponents for Ireland Juniors through to the 1990s with only occasional matches against Wales and the Republic of Ireland for variety.

== Today ==
The main competition for junior level national teams in Europe is the UEFA Regions Cup. Northern Ireland Juniors first entered in 2000 but a change in the rules mean that since 2007 the national team has been unable to enter and a regional select has entered in its stead. Since this change the Eastern Region have been the representatives five times and the Western Region once having won a play-off.

In addition Northern Ireland Juniors regularly compete in the International Quadrangular Tournament along with Scotland, the Republic of Ireland and the Isle of Man. Northern Ireland have won this competition three times, in 1995, 1996 and 2017.

=== Current squad ===
The following players were selected for the Junior International Quadrangular Tournament held in Glasgow, Scotland from 11–14 October 2017.

Kit Number	Position	Name	Club
1	GK	Jordan Williamson	PSNI
12	GK	Paul Wells	Limavady United
2		Dale Montgomery	Loughgall
3		William Armstrong (C)	Harland & Wolff Welders
4		Scott McMillan	Harland & Wolff Welders
5		Dean Curry	Institute
6		Ryan Deans	Harland & Wolff Welders
7		Dylan Wilson	PSNI
8		Jordan Gibson	Lurgan Celtic
9		Warner Mullen	Lurgan Celtic
10		Ryan Campbell	Dergview
11		Ricky Thompson	Dollingstown
13		Ryan Morrow	Institute
14		Aaron Walsh	Maiden City
15		Ryan Arthurs	Knockbreda
16		Adam Gray	Ballyclare Comrades
17		Stewart Nixon	Ballyclare Comrades
18		Stephen Curry	Institute
19		Mark Kelly	Ballyclare Comrades
20		Craig Harris	Harland & Wolff Welders

== Competition Records ==
=== UEFA Regions' Cup ===
Year	Round	GP	W	D	L	GS	GA
1999	did not enter						
2001	Qualifying Round (Luxembourg)	3	1	1	1	8	4
2003	Qualifying Round (Netherlands)	3	1	0	2	4	3
2005	Qualifying Round (Slovenia)	3	1	1	1	6	3
2007^{1}	Finals – Group Stage (Bulgaria)	9	5	3	1	11	6
2009^{1}	Intermediate Round (Germany)	3	1	1	1	3	3
2011^{1}	Intermediate Round (North Macedonia)	6	2	1	3	6	6
2013^{1}	Finals – Group Stage (Italy)	9	5	2	2	15	12
2015^{1}	Finals – Group Stage (Republic of Ireland)	6	4	1	1	15	7
2017^{2}	Intermediate Round (Moldova)	3	0	0	3	2	6
2019^{1}	Intermediate Round (Northern Ireland)	3	1	0	2	3	4
Total		48	21	10	135	70	49

Since 2007, Northern Ireland has been represented by the winner of a play-off between the Eastern Region^{1} and Western Region^{2}.

=== Quadrangular Tournament ===
Year	Round	Position	GP	W	D	L	GS	GA
(Republic of Ireland) 1993–94	did not enter^{1}							
(Scotland) 1994–95	Final	1st	2	1	1	0	4	3
(Isle of Man) 1995–96	Final	1st	2	2	0	0	3	1
(Northern Ireland) 1996–97	Final	2nd	2	0	1	1	2	3
(Republic of Ireland) 1997–98	3rd place play-off	4th	2	0	1	1	1	4
(Scotland) 1998–99	3rd place play-off	4th	2	0	0	2	1	8
(Isle of Man) 1999–2000	3rd place play-off	4th	2	0	0	2	1	3
(Northern Ireland) 2000–01	League	3rd	3	1	0	2	2	5
(Republic of Ireland) 2002-03	League	4th	3	0	1	2	3	9
(Scotland) 2004–05	League	3rd	3	1	1	1	3	4
(Isle of Man) 2007–08	League	3rd	3	0	2	1	6	7
(Northern Ireland) 2009–10	League	4th	3	0	2	1	2	4
(Republic of Ireland) 2013–14	League	3rd	3	1	0	2	3	6
(Scotland) 2017–18	League	1st	3	2	1	0	8	3
Total			33	8	10	15	39	60

^{1} A Mid Ulster side represented Northern Ireland
