= 1964 Tripoli Fair Tournament =

Tournament details
- Host country: Libya
- City: Tripoli
- Dates: 8–17 March 1964
- Teams: 5 (from 3 confederations)
- Venue: 1 (in 1 host city)

Final positions
- Champions: Lebanon (1st title)
- Runners-up: Libya
- Third place: Morocco B
- Fourth place: Sudan B

Tournament statistics
- Matches played: 10
- Goals scored: 22 (2.2 per match)

The 1964 Tripoli Fair Tournament was the 3rd edition of the Tripoli Fair Tournament, and was held from 8 to 17 March 1964 in Tripoli, Libya.

Initially, four teams were due to participate: Lebanon, Libya, Malta B, and Sudan B. Morocco B later joined. Lebanon won the tournament with three wins and one draw.

== Matches ==
| Pos | Team | Pld | W | D | L | GF | GA | GD | Pts | |
|---|---|---|---|---|---|---|---|---|---|---|
| 1 | Lebanon | 4 | 3 | 1 | 0 | 5 | 2 | +3 | 7 | Champions |
| 2 | Libya | 4 | 2 | 1 | 1 | 5 | 3 | +2 | 5 | |
| 3 | Morocco B | 4 | 2 | 0 | 2 | 5 | 5 | 0 | 4 | |
| 4 | Sudan B | 4 | 1 | 1 | 2 | 4 | 3 | +1 | 3 | |
| 5 | Malta B | 4 | 0 | 1 | 3 | 3 | 9 | −6 | 1 | |

Source: RSSSF
8 March 1964

| Sudan B | 0–1 | Morocco B |

8 March 1964

| Lebanon | 1–0 | Libya |
|---|---|---|
| Itani 90' (pen.) |

10 March 1964

| Malta B | 0–1 | Lebanon |

10 March 1964

| Morocco B | 0–2 | Libya |
|---|---|---|
| | | Shamisa; Al-Sanoussi |

13 March 1964

| Lebanon | 2–1 | Morocco B |

13 March 1964

| Sudan B | 3–0 | Malta B |

15 March 1964

| Sudan B | 1–1 | Lebanon |

15 March 1964

| Malta B | 2–2 | Libya |
|---|---|---|
| Goal | | Al-Biski |

17 March 1964

| Sudan B | 0–1 | Libya |

17 March 1964

| Malta B | 1–3 | Morocco B |
