= Paisley & District Amateur Football Association =

- Founded: 1953
- Folded: 2018
- Country: Scotland
- Confederation: UEFA
- Divisions: Premier Division; Division One (A); Division One (B)
- Number of clubs: 28
- Level on pyramid: N/A
- Promotion to: None
- Relegation to: None
- Domestic cup(s): Scottish Amateur Cup
- Last champions: Paisley Athletic
- Website: Official website

The Paisley & District Amateur Football Association (PAFA) was a football (soccer) league competition for amateur clubs in the Paisley area of Scotland. The association was affiliated to the Scottish Amateur Football Association.

The association was composed of three divisions.

== League membership ==
In order to join the association, clubs must apply and are then voted in by current member clubs.

== 2014–15 league members ==
=== Premier Division ===
- AFC Fubar
- Apex
- Arkleston Athletic
- Elderslie
- Fordbank Star
- Gallowhill
- Glenburn Athletic
- Hazelwood
- Linwood Thistle
- Thorn Athletic

=== Division One (A) ===
- Brucehill United
- FC Renfrew Alba
- G-Rock
- Glencoats
- Houston
- Johnstone Thistle
- Linwood Spartans
- Tannahill
- West End Athletic

=== Division One (B) ===
- Boswell
- Glasgow Deaf
- Glentyan Thistle
- Glenvale
- Hillwood
- Langcraigs
- Shortroods
- Stanley Athletic
- Tannahill 'A'
