= San Marino national amateur football team =

San Marino
- Nickname: La Serenissima
- Association: Federazione Sammarinese Giuoco Calcio
- Confederation: UEFA (Europe)
- Head coach: Luigi Bizzotto
- FIFA code: SMR
First colours	Second colours

First international
- Vatican City 0–0 San Marino (Rome, Italy; 22 November 1994)

Biggest win
- San Marino 4–0 South Wales (San Marino, San Marino; 3 June 2016); San Marino 4–0 Anenii Noi (Moldova) (Ptuj, Slovenia; 18 October 2026)

Biggest defeat
- San Marino 0–6 Ligue de Normandie (France) (Bray, Republic of Ireland; 23 October 2010)

UEFA Regions' Cup
- Appearances: 11 (first in 1999)
- Best result: Final tournament (2025)

The San Marino national amateur football team (Italian: Nazionale di calcio amatoriale di San Marino) represents San Marino in the UEFA Regions' Cup and it is controlled by the San Marino Football Federation (FSGC). The team represents the smallest population of any UEFA member.

== Competitive record ==
=== UEFA Regions' Cup ===
UEFA Regions' Cup record									Intermediate round record						Preliminary round record					
Year	Round	Pld	W	D	L	GF	GA	Pts	Pld	W	D	L	GF	GA	Pld	W	D	L	GF	GA
(Italy) 1999	Did not qualify								Did not qualify						3	0	0	3	1	8
(Czech Republic) 2001	Did not qualify								Did not qualify						3	0	0	3	1	8
(Germany) 2003	Did not qualify								Did not qualify						3	1	0	2	2	5
(Poland) 2005	Did not qualify								3	0	0	3	1	7	—N/a					
(Bulgaria) 2007	Did not qualify								3	0	0	3	1	7	—N/a					
(Croatia) 2009	Did not qualify								3	0	1	2	2	10	2	1	1	0	2	1
(Portugal) 2011	Did not qualify								3	0	0	3	0	9	—N/a					
(Italy) 2013	Did not qualify								3	0	1	2	0	2	—N/a					
(Republic of Ireland) 2015	Did not qualify								Did not qualify						3	0	3	0	2	2
(Turkey) 2017	Did not qualify								3	2	0	1	3	5	3	2	1	0	8	1
(Germany) 2019	Did not qualify								3	0	0	3	3	7	—N/a					
(Spain) 2023	Did not qualify								3	1	1	1	4	5	—N/a					
(San Marino) 2025	Group stage	3	0	1	2	1	3	1	3	3	0	0	8	2	—N/a					
2027	Did not qualify								3	1	1	1	5	5	—N/a					
Total	Group stage	3	0	1	2	1	3	1	30	7	4	19	27	59	17	4	5	8	16	25

== Matches ==
27 June 1999 1999 – Preliminary	San Marino	1–3	(Spain) Madrid	Algarve, Portugal

28 June 1999 1999 – Preliminary	Algarve (Portugal)	3–0	San Marino	Algarve, Portugal

30 June 1999 1999 – Preliminary	San Marino	0–2	(France) Auvergne	Algarve, Portugal

10 October 2000 2001 – Preliminary	San Marino	0–1	(Germany) Schleswig-Holstein	San Marino

12 October 2000 2001 – Preliminary	San Marino	0–5	(Portugal) Braga	San Marino

14 October 2000 2001 – Preliminary	MNZ Celje (Slovenia)	2–1	San Marino	San Marino

9 September 2002 2003 – Preliminary	Kent (England)	0–2	San Marino	Tallinn, Estonia

11 September 2002 2003 – Preliminary	South Estonia	2–0	San Marino	Tallinn, Estonia

13 September 2002 2003 – Preliminary	Central Bohemia (Czech Republic)	3–0	San Marino	Tallinn, Estonia

8 November 2004 2005 – Intermediate	San Marino	0–4	Republic of Ireland	Ugljevik, Bosnia and Herzegovina

10 November 2004 2005 – Intermediate	Semberija (Bosnia and Herzegovina)	2–1	San Marino	Bijeljina, Bosnia and Herzegovina

12 November 2004 2005 – Intermediate	Mid-Cheshire (England)	1–0	San Marino	Bijeljina, Bosnia and Herzegovina

29 October 2006 2007 – Intermediate	South-East Region (Bulgaria)	1–0	San Marino	Teteven, Bulgaria

31 October 2006 2007 – Intermediate	San Marino	1–3	(Romania) Oltenia	Pravets, Bulgaria

2 November 2006 2007 – Intermediate	East Attica (Greece)	3–0	San Marino	Pravets, Bulgaria

27 September 2008 2009 – Preliminary	San Marino	1–0	(Hungary) Dráva	San Marino

29 September 2008 2009 – Preliminary	South-East (North Macedonia)	1–1	San Marino	San Marino

4 April 2009 2009 – Intermediate	Atlantique (France)	1–1	San Marino	France

6 April 2009 2009 – Intermediate	San Marino	1–5	(Portugal) Braga	France

8 April 2009 2009 – Intermediate	San Marino	0–4	(Spain) Castile and León	France

23 October 2010 2011 – Intermediate	San Marino	0–6	(France) Ligue de Normandie	Bray, Republic of Ireland
14:30 (WEST)		Report	Cibelli 27' (o.g.); Gilbert 67'; Affagard 69', 73', 85', 88'	Stadium: Carlisle Grounds; Referee: Elmir Pilav (Bosnia & Herzegovina)

25 October 2010 2011 – Intermediate	Leinster & Munster (Republic of Ireland)	2–0	San Marino	Dublin, Republic of Ireland
14:30 (WEST)	Carrig 3'; Lacey 8'	Report		Stadium: Tolka Park; Referee: Elmir Pilav (Bosnia & Herzegovina)

27 October 2010 2011 – Intermediate	Abruzzo (Italy)	1–0	San Marino	Dublin, Republic of Ireland
14:30 (WEST)	Lalli 44'	Report		Stadium: UCD Bowl; Referee: Alan Mario Sant (Malta)

6 March 2013 2013 – Intermediate	San Marino	0–1	(Northern Ireland) Eastern Region	Serravalle, San Marino
20:30 (CET)		Report	Ryan 66'	Stadium: Stadio Olimpico; Referee: Sergey Tsinkevich (Belarus)

8 March 2013 2013 – Intermediate	San Marino	0–0	(Republic of Ireland) Leinster & Munster	San Marino, San Marino
16:00 (CET)		Report		Stadium: Montecchio; Referee: Þóroddur Hjaltalín (Iceland)

10 March 2015 2013 – Intermediate	Jersey (England)	1–0	San Marino	San Marino, San Marino
16:00 (CET)	Watson 70'	Report		Stadium: Montecchio; Referee: Þóroddur Hjaltalín (Iceland)

15 June 2014 2015 – Preliminary	San Marino	0–0	East West Central Scotland	Radenci, Slovenia
17:30 CET		Report		Stadium: Radenci Sports Park; Referee: Petur Reinert (Faroe Islands)

17 June 2014 2015 – Preliminary	Murska Sobota (Slovenia)	1–1	San Marino	Bakovci, Slovenia
17:30 CET	Čontala 66' (pen.)	Report	Mikhaylovski 7'	Stadium: Bakovci Stadium; Referee: Lorenc Jemini (Albania)

19 June 2014 2015 – Preliminary	Euboea (Greece)	1–1	San Marino	Radenci, Slovenia
17:30 CET	Vezirtzoglou 89'	Report	Della Valle 70'	Stadium: Radenci Sports Park; Referee: Petur Reinert (Faroe Islands)

3 June 2016 2017 – Preliminary	San Marino	4–0	South Wales	San Marino, San Marino
16:00 CEST	Jaupi 45', 53'; Bernardi 65'; Battistini 77'	Report		Stadium: Stadio Montecchio; Referee: Lasha Silagava (Georgia)

5 June 2016 2017 – Preliminary	ZSMK Shymkent (Kazakhstan)	0–3	San Marino	Serravalle, San Marino
19:00 CEST		Report	Jaupi 7'; Bernardi 12', 16'	Stadium: Stadio Olimpico; Referee: Ignasi Villamayor Rozados (Andorra)

7 June 2016 2017 – Preliminary	Xanthi (Greece)	1–1	San Marino	San Marino, San Marino
16:00 CEST	Lipen 21' (o.g.)	Report	Jaupi 72'	Stadium: Stadio Montecchio; Referee: Fedayi San (Switzerland)

27 October 2016 2017 – Intermediate	Tuzla Canton (Bosnia and Herzegovina)	0–1	San Marino	Razlog, Bulgaria
13:00 EEST		Report	Jaupi 63'	Stadium: Stadion Septemvri; Referee: Aleksandr Gauzer (Kazakhstan)

29 October 2016 2017 – Intermediate	San Marino	1–5	(Bulgaria) South-West Region	Razlog, Bulgaria
13:00 EET	Jaupi 90'	Report	Syunetchiev 13'; Yurukov 54'; Hadzhiev 72', 74'; Dzhondzhorov 90+2'	Stadium: Stadion Septemvri; Referee: Sergey Tsinkevich (Belarus)

31 October 2016 2017 – Intermediate	San Marino	1–0	(Spain) Castile and León	Razlog, Bulgaria
13:00 EET	Cuttone 27'	Report		Stadium: Stadion Septemvri; Referee: Aleksandr Gauzer (Kazakhstan)

16 June 2018 2019 – Intermediate	Győr-Moson-Sopron County (Hungary)	2–1	San Marino	Vrchlabí, Czech Republic
17:00 CEST	Rigó 7'} Honyák 52'	Report	Angelini 89' (pen.)	Stadium: Atletický stadion Vejsplachy; Referee: Giorgi Kruashvili (Georgia)

17 June 2018 2019 – Intermediate	Hradec Králové Region (Czech Republic)	2–0	San Marino	Vrchlabí, Czech Republic
11:00 CEST	Kejzlar 7'; Holec 90+1'	Report		Stadium: Atletický stadion Vejsplachy; Referee: Giorgi Kruashvili (Georgia)

20 June 2018 2019 – Intermediate	San Marino	2–3	(Bosnia and Herzegovina) East Sarajevo	Vrchlabí, Czech Republic
17:00 CEST	Angelini 20'; Ceccaroli 77'	Report	Blagojević 68', 79'; Damjanović 81'	Stadium: Atletický stadion Vejsplachy; Referee: Fyodor Zammit (Malta)

25 October 2022 2023 – Intermediate	San Marino	0–2	Republic of Ireland	Albena, Bulgaria
		Report	Casey 75'; Murphy 81'	Stadium: Stadion Albena 1 Referee: Zaven Hovhannisyan (Armenia)

28 October 2022 2023 – Intermediate	San Marino	1–1	SW Bulgaria	Albena, Bulgaria
	Mema 84' (pen.)	Report	Krastev 41'	Stadium: Stadion Albena 1 Referee: Peter Kralović (Slovakia)

31 October 2022 2023 – Intermediate	San Marino	3–2	(Romania) Prahova Muntenia	Albena, Bulgaria
	Mema 58' (pen.); Comuniello 67'; Oprea 72' (o.g.)	Report	Nicolae 52'; Anghel 86'	Stadium: Stadion Albena 1 Referee: Zaven Hovhannisyan (Armenia)
