= 2023 UEFA Regions' Cup =

Tournament details
- Host country: Final tournament: Spain
- Dates: Qualifying rounds: 23 June – 8 November 2022; Final tournament: 9–17 June 2023
- Teams: Final tournament: 8 Total: 35 (from 35 associations)

Final positions
- Champions: (Spain) Galicia (1st title)
- Runners-up: (Serbia) Belgrade

Tournament statistics
- Top scorer(s): (Belarus) Siarhei Lizunou (Kolos Cherven) (7 goals)

The 2023 UEFA Regions' Cup was the 12th edition of the UEFA Regions' Cup, a football competition for amateur teams in Europe organized by UEFA.

Lower Silesia from Poland was the title holder. In the final, Galicia from Spain defeated Belgrade.

== Teams ==
A total of 35 teams entered the tournament. Clubs/teams from Russia were barred from participation.

Associations were ranked according to their UEFA coefficients, computed based on results of the last three seasons (2015, 2017, 2019), to decide on the round their teams entered and their seeding pots in the preliminary and intermediate round draws. The top 35 associations entered the intermediate round, while the bottom 5 associations (ranked 32–36) entered the preliminary round.

The draw for the preliminary and intermediate rounds was held on 8 December 2021, 16:00 CET (UTC+1), at the UEFA headquarters in Nyon, Switzerland. The mechanism of the draws for each round was as follows:

- In the preliminary round, the five teams were drawn into two groups of two and three without any seeding.
- In the intermediate round, the 31 teams were drawn into eight groups of four. Each group contained one team from Pot A, one team from Pot B, one team from Pot C, and either one team from Pot D or one team which advanced from the preliminary round (whose identity was not known at the time of the draw).

For political reasons, teams from Russia and Ukraine would not be drawn in the same group. The hosts for each group in the preliminary and intermediate rounds would be selected after the draw. On 28 February 2022, UEFA suspended all Russian clubs from participating in UEFA competitions. Russia's spot will be replaced by the preliminary round runners-up.

Qualified teams for 2023 UEFA Regions' Cup
Entry round	Rank	Association	Team	Qualifying competition	Coeff	Pot
Intermediate round	1	Turkey	Kayseri	2022 Turkish stage of the UEFA Regions' Cup	14.333	A
Intermediate round	2	Croatia	(Split, Croatia) Split-Dalmatia		14.000	A
Intermediate round	3	Republic of Ireland			12.667	A
Intermediate round	4	Poland	(Lower Silesian Voivodeship) Lower Silesia		12.333	A
Intermediate round	5	Germany	Bavaria		12.333	A
Intermediate round	6	Czech Republic	Zlín Region		12.333	A
Intermediate round	7	Spain	(Galicia (Spain)) Galicia	2019–20 Spanish stage of the UEFA Regions' Cup	12.000	A
Intermediate round	8	~~Russia~~	excluded		~~11.667~~	A
Intermediate round	9	Portugal	Lisbon		10.333	B
Intermediate round	10	Ukraine	Ivano-Frankivsk Oblast	2022 UAF Regions' Cup	10.000	B
Intermediate round	11	Hungary	Pest County		9.333	B
Intermediate round	12	Italy	Lazio		9.000	B
Intermediate round	13	Slovakia	Western Slovakia		8.667	B
Intermediate round	14	Bulgaria	South West Bulgaria	Regional amateur team	8.000	B
Intermediate round	15	Northern Ireland	Eastern Region		8.000	B
Intermediate round	16	Bosnia and Herzegovina	Zenica-Doboj Canton		8.000	B
Intermediate round	17	Switzerland	(Canton of Geneva) Geneva		7.667	C
Intermediate round	18	Serbia	Belgrade		7.667	C
Intermediate round	19	England	Jersey		6.667	C
Intermediate round	20	Israel	Hapoel Bik'at HaYarden		5.833	C
Intermediate round	21	Latvia	Latvia	National amateur team	5.333	C
Intermediate round	22	Romania	Prahova Muntenia		5.000	C
Intermediate round	23	Wales	Tîm Rhanbarthol Cymru		5.000	C
Intermediate round	24	Finland	Tampere		5.000	C
Intermediate round	25	San Marino	San Marino	National amateur team	4.667	D
Intermediate round	26	Slovenia	Ljubljana		4.333	D
Intermediate round	27	Moldova	Ialoveni		4.333	D
Intermediate round	28	Malta	Malta	National amateur team	4.333	D
Intermediate round	29	North Macedonia	North Macedonia	National amateur team	4.167	D
Intermediate round	30	Scotland	Central Scotland	Regional amateur team	4.000	D
Intermediate round	31	Sweden	Gothenburg		4.000	D
Preliminary round	32	Belarus	Kolos Cherven		3.333	1
Preliminary round	33	Azerbaijan	Jabrayil		3.000	1
Preliminary round	34	Kazakhstan	Kaskelen		2.000	1
Preliminary round	35	Estonia	Tallinna FC Zapoos	2021 Estonian Small Cup	1.000	1
Preliminary round	36	Georgia	Basiani		0.333	1

Associations which did not enter
Albania	Andorra	Armenia	Austria	Belgium
Cyprus	Denmark	Faroe Islands	France	Gibraltar
Greece	Iceland	Kosovo	Liechtenstein	Lithuania
Luxembourg	Montenegro	Netherlands	Norway	

== Preliminary round ==
The group winners advance to the intermediate round to join the 30 teams which receive byes to the intermediate round.

Times are CEST (UTC+2), as listed by UEFA (local times, if different, are in parentheses).

=== Group A ===
Pos	Team	Pld	W	D	L	GF	GA	GD	Pts	Qualification
1	(Georgia (country)) Basiani	2	2	0	0	6	1	+5	6	Advance to Intermediate round
2	(Kazakhstan) Kaskelen	2	1	0	1	5	3	+2	3	
3	(Estonia) Tallinna Zapoos	2	0	0	2	1	8	−7	0	

Source: UEFA
23 June 2022
14:00 (16:00 AZT)

Basiani (Georgia (country))	3–1	(Estonia) Tallinna Zapoos
Khidesheli 37'; Tevzadze 71'; Lepsaia 90+4'	Report	Väljas 20'

ASK Arena, Baku
Attendance: 40
Referee: David Smajc (Slovenia)

25 June 2022
14:00 (16:00 AZT)

Tallinna Zapoos (Estonia)	0–5	(Kazakhstan) Kaskelen
	Report	Chulagov 8'; Zhumabekov 16' (pen.); Orazbekov 29'; Yessimkhanov 32'; Sauranbayev 63' (pen.)

ASK Arena, Baku
Attendance: 45
Referee: Elchin Masiyev (Azerbaijan)

27 June 2022
14:00 (16:00 AZT)

Kaskelen (Kazakhstan)	0–3 (Awarded) (originally 2–1)	(Georgia (country)) Basiani
Chulagov 7'; Kazybekov 30'	Report	Makasarashvili 57'

ASK Arena, Baku
Attendance: 41
Referee: Damian Sylwestrzak (Poland)

=== Group B ===
Pos	Team	Pld	W	D	L	GF	GA	GD	Pts	Qualification
1	(Belarus) Kolos Cherven	2	2	0	0	8	3	+5	6	Advance to Intermediate round
2	(Azerbaijan) Jabrayil (H)	2	0	0	2	3	8	−5	0	

Source: UEFA
(H) Hosts
24 June 2022
14:00 (16:00 AZT)

Kolos Cherven (Belarus)	2–1	(Azerbaijan) Jabrayil
Simanchyk 62'; Paliashchuk 74'	Report	Süleymanlı 10'

Shamakhi City Stadium, Shamakhi
Attendance: 1,550
Referee: Damian Sylwestrzak (Poland)

26 June 2022
14:00 (16:00 AZT)

Jabrayil (Azerbaijan)	2–6	(Belarus) Kolos Cherven
Hamidov 10', 30'	Report	Hurynovich 6'; Lizunou 31', 61', 77' (pen.); Simanchyk 72'; Karatkevich 86'

Shamakhi City Stadium, Shamakhi
Attendance: 1,753
Referee: David Smajc (Slovenia)

=== Final ===
29 June 2022
14:00 (16:00 AZT)

Kaskelen (Kazakhstan)	0–5	(Belarus) Kolos Cherven
	Report	Lizunou 77', 83' (pen.), 90+2'; Karatkevich 88', 89'

Shamakhi City Stadium, Shamakhi
Attendance: 1,150
Referee: Luca Cibelli (Switzerland)

== Intermediate round ==
The eight group winners advance to the final tournament. The winners of each group qualify for the finals, which in principle will be held in the last two weeks of June 2023, with the hosts to be decided when the qualifiers are known.

Times are CEST (UTC+2), as listed by UEFA (local times, if different, are in parentheses).

=== Group 1 ===
Pos	Team	Pld	W	D	L	GF	GA	GD	Pts	Qualification
1	(Bosnia and Herzegovina) Zenica-Doboj (H)	3	2	1	0	5	2	+3	7	Final tournament
2	(Israel) Hapoel Bik'at HaYarden	3	2	0	1	10	3	+7	6	
3	Central Scotland	3	1	1	1	5	9	−4	4	
4	(Georgia (country)) Basiani	3	0	0	3	4	10	−6	0	

Source: UEFA
Rules for classification: Tiebreakers
(H) Hosts
22 August 2022
11:00

Hapoel Bik'at HaYarden (Israel)	0–1	(Bosnia and Herzegovina) Zenica-Doboj
	Report	Nuhanović 2'

FF BH Football Training Centre, Zenica
Attendance: 50
Referee: Miguel Bertolo Nogueira (Portugal)
22 August 2022
16:00

Basiani (Georgia (country))	1–4	Central Scotland
Shengelia 88'	Report	Mckenzie 48'; Lawson 50'; Buchanan 70'; Mcelroy 78'

FF BH Football Training Centre, Zenica
Attendance: 20
Referee: Martin Dohál (Slovakia)

25 August 2022
11:00

Zenica-Doboj (Bosnia and Herzegovina)	0–0	Central Scotland
	Report

FF BH Football Training Centre, Zenica
Attendance: 100
Referee: Jan Petřík (Czechia)
25 August 2022
16:00

Basiani (Georgia (country))	1–2	(Israel) Hapoel Bik'at HaYarden
Silakadze 80'	Report	Yosef 90+1' (pen.); Azulay 90+3'

FF BH Football Training Centre, Zenica
Attendance: 70
Referee: Martin Dohál (Slovakia)

28 August 2022
11:00

Central Scotland	1–8	(Israel) Hapoel Bik'at HaYarden
Paterson 90'	Report	Yosef 10' (pen.); Benbenistu 12', 73'; Salilih 42', 57', 77', 81'; Maduel 84'

Mladost Stadium, Kakanj
Attendance: 10
Referee: Miguel Bertolo Nogueira (Portugal)
28 August 2022
11:00

Zenica-Doboj (Bosnia and Herzegovina)	4–2	(Georgia (country)) Basiani
Jupić 24', 45'; Šijerkić 59'; Hajdić 77'	Report	Khidesheli 44'; Silakadze 71'

FF BH Football Training Centre, Zenica
Attendance: 150
Referee: Jan Petřík (Czechia)

=== Group 2 ===
Pos	Team	Pld	W	D	L	GF	GA	GD	Pts	Qualification
1	(Poland) Lower Silesia	3	3	0	0	11	2	+9	9	Final tournament
2	West Slovakia	3	2	0	1	15	4	+11	6	
3	Latvia (H)	3	0	1	2	0	10	−10	1	
4	(Moldova) Ialoveni	3	0	1	2	0	10	−10	1	

Source: UEFA
Rules for classification: Tiebreakers
(H) Hosts
24 August 2022
16:00

West Slovakia	2–4	(Poland) Lower Silesia
Holíček 45+1' (pen.); Domasta 49'	Report	Bohdanowicz 21'; Tragarz 65'; Šoky 74' (o.g.); Bońkowski 83'

LNK Sporta Parks, Riga
Attendance: 20
Referee: Miloš Savović (Montenegro)
24 August 2022
09:00

Latvia	0–0	(Moldova) Ialoveni
	Report

LNK Sporta Parks, Riga
Attendance: 30
Referee: Nenad Minaković (Serbia)

27 August 2022
16:00

Lower Silesia (Poland)	2–0	(Moldova) Ialoveni
Kotyla 36'; Slonecki 80'	Report

LNK Sporta Parks, Riga
Attendance: 20
Referee: Miloš Savović (Montenegro)
27 August 2022
09:00

Latvia	0–5	West Slovakia
	Report	Holíček 3' (pen.); Matuškovič 10'; Molnár 21'; Janek 76'; Londák 79'

LNK Sporta Parks, Riga
Attendance: 40
Referee: Oleksii Derevinskyi (Ukraine)

30 August 2022
18:00

Lower Silesia (Poland)	5–0	Latvia
Moseičenko 53' (o.g.); Bońkowski 80'; Wojciechowski 81', 90+2'; Sadowski 89'	Report

BSS Stadium, Salaspils
Attendance: 30
Referee: Nenad Minaković (Serbia)
30 August 2022
18:00

Ialoveni (Moldova)	0–8	West Slovakia
	Report	Popov 10' (o.g.); Londák 11'; Matuškovič 15'; Gáborík 45+2'; Dvorák 50', 68'; Domasta 54'; Polevka 80'

LNK Sporta Parks, Riga
Attendance: 16
Referee: Oleksii Derevinskyi (Ukraine)

=== Group 3 ===
Pos	Team	Pld	W	D	L	GF	GA	GD	Pts	Qualification
1	(Portugal) Lisbon	3	2	0	1	6	2	+4	6	Final tournament
2	(Belarus) Kolos Cherven	3	1	1	1	5	4	+1	4	
3	(Finland) Tampere	3	1	1	1	5	5	0	4	
4	(Turkey) Kayseri (H)	3	1	0	2	2	7	−5	3	

Source: UEFA
Rules for classification: Tiebreakers
(H) Hosts
2 November 2022
10:30

Kayseri (Turkey)	0–3	(Belarus) Kolos Cherven
	Report	Lizunou 30'; Paliashchuk 45+1'; Karatkevich 52'

Beylerbeyi 75. Yıl Stadium, Istanbul
Attendance: 34
Referee: Donald Robertson (Scotland)
2 November 2022
14:30

Tampere (Finland)	2–1	(Portugal) Lisbon
Bullock 65'; Toijala 73'	Report	Cardoso 59' (pen.)

Beylerbeyi 75. Yıl Stadium, Istanbul
Attendance: 47
Referee: Walter Altmann (Austria)

5 November 2022
11:30

Kayseri (Turkey)	2–1	(Finland) Tampere
Yıldız 2'; Karaboğa 5'	Report	Raittinen 39'

Beylerbeyi 75. Yıl Stadium, Istanbul
Attendance: 91
Referee: Volen Chinkov (Bulgaria)
5 November 2022
15:30

Lisbon (Portugal)	2–0	(Belarus) Kolos Cherven
Cardoso 20' (pen.); Oliveira 59'	Report

Beylerbeyi 75. Yıl Stadium, Istanbul
Attendance: 34
Referee: Walter Altmann (Austria)

8 November 2022
13:30

Kolos Cherven (Belarus)	2–2	(Finland) Tampere
Haliuk 53'; Semkin 85'	Report	Ivashkin 20' (o.g.); Bright 90+1'

Bulvar Mimar Kubilay Kose Stadium, Kartal
Attendance: 48
Referee: Donald Robertson (Scotland)
8 November 2022
13:30

Lisbon (Portugal)	3–0	(Turkey) Kayseri
Dias 9'; Martins 65'; Cardoso 83' (pen.)	Report

Beylerbeyi 75. Yıl Stadium, Istanbul
Attendance: 57
Referee: Volen Chinkov (Bulgaria)

=== Group 4 ===
Pos	Team	Pld	W	D	L	GF	GA	GD	Pts	Qualification
1	(Czech Republic) Zlín	3	2	1	0	12	4	+8	7	Final tournament
2	(Wales) Tîm Rhanbarthol Cymru	3	2	0	1	13	5	+8	6	
3	(Northern Ireland) Eastern Region (H)	3	1	1	1	6	4	+2	4	
4	(Sweden) Gothenburg	3	0	0	3	1	19	−18	0	

Source: UEFA
Rules for classification: Tiebreakers
(H) Hosts
10 October 2022
15:00

Zlín (Czech Republic)	8–1	(Sweden) Gothenburg
Juřica 9'; Gojš 30', 48'; Glozyga 58'; Jakubowicz 71', 90'; Kašík 80'; Goňa 87'	Report	Lindström 34'

Inver Park, Larne
Attendance: 28
Referee: Gal Leibovitz (Israel)
10 October 2022
21:00

Tîm Rhanbarthol Cymru (Wales)	3–2	(Northern Ireland) Eastern Region
Roberts 12'; Cathrall 33'; Allshorn 87'	Report	Mckervey 9' (pen.), 76'

Inver Park, Larne
Attendance: 178
Referee: Kai Eric Steen (Norway)

13 October 2022
15:00

Zlín (Czech Republic)	3–2	(Wales) Tîm Rhanbarthol Cymru
Gojš 24'; Juřica 60'; Jakubowicz 64'	Report	Williams 38', 48'

Seaview, Belfast
Attendance: 60
Referee: Juri Frischer (Estonia)
13 October 2022
21:00

Eastern Region (Northern Ireland)	3–0	(Sweden) Gothenburg
Neale 50'; Newell 90'; Devine 90+2'	Report

Inver Park, Larne
Attendance: 142
Referee: Kai Erik Steen (Norway)

16 October 2022
15:00

Eastern Region (Northern Ireland)	1–1	(Czech Republic) Zlín
Downey 46'	Report	Gorman 80' (o.g.)

Solitude, Belfast
Attendance: 196
Referee: Juri Frischer (Estonia)
16 October 2022
15:00

Gothenburg (Sweden)	0–8	(Wales) Tîm Rhanbarthol Cymru
	Report	Landström 8' (o.g.); Hyne 18'; Allshorn 41'; Downey 50', 83'; Williams 51', 66'; Parry 86'

Inver Park, Larne
Attendance: 20
Referee: Gal Leibovitz (Israel)

=== Group 5 ===
Pos	Team	Pld	W	D	L	GF	GA	GD	Pts	Qualification
1	(Germany) Bavaria	3	2	0	1	5	2	+3	6	Final tournament
2	(Italy) Lazio (H)	3	1	1	1	2	3	−1	4 (Note: Head-to-head points: Lazio 3, Jersey 0.)	
3	(England) Jersey	3	1	1	1	2	2	0	4	
4	North Macedonia	3	0	2	1	1	3	−2	2	

Source: UEFA
Rules for classification: Tiebreakers
(H) Hosts
Notes:
29 September 2022
09:00

Lazio (Italy)	1–0	(England) Jersey
Rossi 80'	Report

Aprilia Stadium, Aprilia
Attendance: 81
Referee: Christopher Jaeger (Austria)
29 September 2022
09:00

Bavaria (Germany)	2–0	North Macedonia
Winkler 13'; Mayer 24'	Report

Stadio Comunale Domenico Francioni, Latina
Attendance: 20
Referee: Abdulkadir Bitigen (Turkey)

2 October 2022
09:00

Lazio (Italy)	1–1	North Macedonia
Damiani 90+4'	Report	Andonov 71' (pen.)

Aprilia Stadium, Aprilia
Attendance: 84
Referee: Christopher Jaeger (Austria)
2 October 2022
09:00

Bavaria (Germany)	1–2	(England) Jersey
Mayer 66'	Report	Mendes 62'; Giles 90+4'

Stadio Comunale Domenico Francioni, Latina
Attendance: 50
Referee: Robertas Valikonis (Lithuania)

5 October 2022
09:00

Lazio (Italy)	0–2	(Germany) Bavaria
	Report	Gashi 45' (pen.), 61'

Stadio Comunale Domenico Francioni, Latina
Attendance: 96
Referee: Robertas Valikonis (Lithuania)
5 October 2022
09:00

Jersey (England)	0–0	North Macedonia national amateur football team
	Report

Aprilia Stadium, Aprilia
Attendance: 15
Referee: Abdulkadir Bitigen (Turkey)

=== Group 6 ===
Pos	Team	Pld	W	D	L	GF	GA	GD	Pts	Qualification
1	Republic of Ireland	3	3	0	0	7	0	+7	9	Final tournament
2	San Marino	3	1	1	1	4	5	−1	4	
3	SW Bulgaria (H)	3	0	2	1	2	3	−1	2	
4	(Romania) Prahova Muntenia	3	0	1	2	3	8	−5	1	

Source: UEFA
Rules for classification: Tiebreakers
(H) Hosts
25 October 2022

Republic of Ireland	2–0	San Marino
Casey 75'; Murphy 81'	Report

Stadion Albena 1, Albena
Attendance: 20
Referee: Zaven Hovhannisyan (Armenia)
25 October 2022

Prahova Muntenia (Romania)	1–1	SW Bulgaria
Baciu 60' (pen.)	Report	Stoynev 44' (pen.)

Stadium Albena 1, Albena
Attendance: 50
Referee: Peter Kráľovič (Slovakia)

28 October 2022

Republic of Ireland	4–0	(Romania) Prahova Muntenia
Mcmullan 37'; Burgess 53'; Murphy 61'; Chambers 68' (pen.)	Report

Stadium Albena 1, Albena
Attendance: 35
Referee: Vassilis Fotias (Greece)
28 October 2022

SW Bulgaria	1–1	San Marino
Krastev 41'	Report	Mema 84' (pen.)

Stadium Albena 1, Albena
Attendance: 50
Referee: Peter Kráľovič (Slovakia)

31 October 2022

SW Bulgaria	0–1	Republic of Ireland
	Report	Chambers 70'

Stadion Spartak, Varna
Attendance: 75
Referee: Vassilis Fotias (Greece)
31 October 2022

San Marino	3–2	(Romania) Prahova Muntenia
Mema 58' (pen.); Comuniello 67'; Oprea 72' (o.g.)	Report	Nicolae 52'; Anghel 86'

Stadion Albena 1, Albena
Attendance: 25
Referee: Zaven Hovhannisyan (Armenia)

=== Group 7 ===
Pos	Team	Pld	W	D	L	GF	GA	GD	Pts	Qualification
1	(Spain) Galicia (H)	3	2	1	0	6	2	+4	7	Final tournament
2	(Hungary) Pest Region	3	1	1	1	2	2	0	4	
3	(Switzerland) Geneve	3	1	0	2	4	3	+1	3 (Note: Head-to-head points: Geneve 3, Ljubljana 0.)	
4	(Slovenia) Ljubljana	3	1	0	2	1	6	−5	3	

Source: UEFA
Rules for classification: Tiebreakers
(H) Hosts
Notes:
6 October 2022
10:30

Genève (Switzerland)	0–1	(Hungary) Pest Region
	Report	Horváth 18'

Estadio de Baltar, Sanxenxo
Attendance: 60
Referee: Joonas Jaanovits (Estonia)
6 October 2022
13:00

Galicia (Spain)	3–0	(Slovenia) Ljubljana
Rial 47'; Rey 72'; Martínez 89'	Report

Estadio de A Lomba, Villagarcia de Arousa
Attendance: 367
Referee: Jørgen Burchardt (Denmark)

9 October 2022

Galicia (Spain)	2–1	(Switzerland) Genève
Rial 32'; Rey 43'	Report	Lhoneux 90+2'

Estadio de Baltar, Sanxenxo
Attendance: 442
Referee: Ian McNabb (Northern Ireland)
9 October 2022

Pest Region (Hungary)	0–1	(Slovenia) Ljubljana
	Report	Klančar 90+4'

Campo Municipal de A Lomba, Villagarcia de Arousa
Attendance: 79
Referee: Joonas Jaanovits (Estonia)

12 October 2022

Ljubljana (Slovenia)	0–3	(Switzerland) Genève
	Report	Ibongo 57'; Munishi 81', 90+2'

Estadio de Baltar, Sanxenxo
Attendance: 50
Referee: Jørgen Burchardt (Denmark)
12 October 2022

Galicia (Spain)	1–1	(Hungary) Pest Region
Otero 52'	Report	Orbán 90+5'

Campo Municipal de A Lomba, Villagarcia de Arousa
Attendance: 1,600
Referee: Ian McNabb (Northern Ireland)

=== Group 8 ===
Pos	Team	Pld	W	D	L	GF	GA	GD	Pts	Qualification
1	(Serbia) Belgrade	2	1	1	0	4	1	+3	4	Final tournament
2	(Croatia) Split Region (H)	2	1	1	0	3	2	+1	4	
3	Malta	2	0	0	2	1	5	−4	0	
4	(Ukraine) Ivano-Frankivsk Oblast	0	0	0	0	0	0	0	0	

Source: UEFA
Rules for classification: Tiebreakers
(H) Hosts
28 September 2022
10:30

Belgrade (Serbia)	Cancelled	(Ukraine) Ivano-Frankivsk Oblast
	Report

Stanovi Stadium, Zadar
28 September 2022
10:30

Split Region (Croatia)	2–1	Malta
Škarić 7'; Andrić 41'	Report	Cutajar 65' (pen.)

Stadion Hrvatski vitezovi, Dugopolje
Attendance: 160
Referee: Nikola Popov (Bulgaria)

1 October 2022
10:30

Split Region (Croatia)	1–1	(Serbia) Belgrade
Jurić 45+2'	Report	Gavrilović 24'

Stanovi Stadium, Zadar
Attendance: 200
Referee: Irakli Kvirikashvili (Georgia)
1 October 2022
10:30

Malta	Cancelled	(Ukraine) Ivano-Frankivsk Oblast
	Report

Stadion Šubićevac, Šibenik

4 October 2022
10:30

Malta	0–3	(Serbia) Belgrade
	Report	Šarić 50'; Gavrilović 62'; Vuković 71' (pen.)

Stanovi Stadium, Zadar
Attendance: 40
Referee: Jonathan Lardot (Belgium)
4 October 2022
10:30

Split Region (Croatia)	Cancelled	(Ukraine) Ivano-Frankivsk Oblast
	Report

Stadion Šubićevac, Šibenik

== Final tournament ==
The hosts of the final tournament will be selected by UEFA from the eight qualified teams.

=== Qualified teams ===
The following teams qualified for the final tournament.

Team	Method of qualification	Date of qualification
(Bosnia and Herzegovina) Zenica-Doboj	Intermediate round Group 1 winners	28 August 2022
(Poland) Lower Silesia	Intermediate round Group 2 winners	30 August 2022
(Serbia) Belgrade	Intermediate round Group 8 winners	4 October 2022
(Germany) Bavaria	Intermediate round Group 5 winners	5 October 2022
(Spain) Galicia	Intermediate round Group 7 winners	12 October 2022
(Czech Republic) Zlín	Intermediate round Group 4 winners	16 October 2022
Republic of Ireland	Intermediate round Group 6 winners	28 October 2022
(Portugal) Lisbon	Intermediate round Group 3 winners	8 November 2022

=== Group A ===
Pos	Team	Pld	W	D	L	GF	GA	GD	Pts	Qualification
1	(Spain) Galicia (H)	3	3	0	0	5	1	+4	9	Final
2	(Germany) Bavaria	3	2	0	1	7	1	+6	6	Bronze medal
3	(Bosnia and Herzegovina) Zenica-Doboj	3	0	1	2	2	8	−6	1	
4	Republic of Ireland	3	0	1	2	1	5	−4	1	

Source: UEFA
Rules for classification: Tiebreakers
(H) Hosts
9 June 2023
19:00

Galicia (Spain)	2–0	Republic of Ireland
Martinez 9'; Magisano 90'	Report

Campo Municipal de Burgáns, Cambados
Attendance: 1,114
Referee: Ádám Farkas (Hungary)
9 June 2023
19:00

Zenica-Doboj (Bosnia and Herzegovina)	0–5	(Germany) Bavaria
	Report	Kania 27' (pen.), 33', 73'; Sauer 90', 90+3'

Campo de Fútbol de A Senra, Ribadumia
Attendance: 97
Referee: Kristoffer Karlsson (Sweden)

11 June 2023
17:00

Bavaria (Germany)	2–0	Republic of Ireland
Mcmullan 8' (o.g.); Kania 72'	Report

Campo Municipal de Burgáns, Cambados
Attendance: 304
Referee: Luis Teixeira (Andorra)
11 June 2023
19:00

Galicia (Spain)	2–1	(Bosnia and Herzegovina) Zenica-Doboj
Rey 24'; Otero 50'	Report	Subašić 69'

Estadio de Baltar, Portonovo
Attendance: 1,000
Referee: Trustin Farrugia Cann (Malta)

14 June 2023
19:00

Republic of Ireland	1–1	(Bosnia and Herzegovina) Zenica-Doboj
Carr 90+3'	Report	Krehmić 45+2'

Campo de Fútbol de A Senra, Ribadumia
Attendance: 102
Referee: Antti Munukka (Finland)
14 June 2023
19:00

Bavaria (Germany)	0–1	(Spain) Galicia
	Report	Rey 7' (pen.)

Campo Municipal de A Lomba, Vilagarcía de Arousa
Attendance: 2,200
Referee: Sigurd Kringstad (Norway)

=== Group B ===
Pos	Team	Pld	W	D	L	GF	GA	GD	Pts	Qualification
1	(Serbia) Belgrade	3	2	1	0	4	2	+2	7	Final
2	(Czech Republic) Zlín	3	1	2	0	2	1	+1	5	Bronze medal
3	(Portugal) Lisbon	3	1	0	2	2	3	−1	3	
4	(Poland) Lower Silesia	3	0	1	2	0	2	−2	1	

Source: UEFA
Rules for classification: Tiebreakers
9 June 2023
17:00

Zlín (Czech Republic)	1–1	(Serbia) Belgrade
Sopůšek 74'	Report	Pavlović 80'

Campo Municipal de A Lomba, Vilagarcía de Arousa
Attendance: 83
Referee: Luis Teixeira (Andorra)
9 June 2023
17:00

Lisbon (Portugal)	1–0	(Poland) Lower Silesia
Rodrigo 43'	Report

Estadio de Baltar, Portonovo
Attendance: 100
Referee: Trustin Farrugia Cann (Malta)

11 June 2023
17:00

Belgrade (Serbia)	1–0	(Poland) Lower Silesia
Miljković 32'	Report

Campo Municipal de A Lomba, Vilagarcía de Arousa
Attendance: 97
Referee: Antti Munukka (Finland)
11 June 2023
19:00

Lisbon (Portugal)	0–1	(Czech Republic) Zlín
	Report	Krajča 60'

Campo de Fútbol de A Senra, Ribadumia
Attendance: 180
Referee: Sigurd Kringstad (Norway)

14 June 2023
19:00

Lower Silesia (Poland)	0–0	(Czech Republic) Zlín
	Report

Campo Municipal de Burgáns, Cambados
Attendance: 144
Referee: Ádám Farkas (Hungary)
14 June 2023
19:00

Belgrade (Serbia)	2–1	(Portugal) Lisbon
Gavrilović 42', 68'	Report	Henriques 90+5'

Estadio de Baltar, Portonovo
Attendance: 80
Referee: Kristoffer Karlsson (Sweden)

=== Final ===
In the final, extra time and penalty shoot-out are used to decide the winner if necessary.

17 June 2023
19:00

Galicia (Spain)	3–1	(Serbia) Belgrade
Rial 9'; Rey 41' (pen.); Martinez 74'	Report	Kolarević 57'

Campo Municipal de A Lomba, Vilagarcía de Arousa
Attendance: 4,085
Referee: Kristoffer Karlsson (Sweden)

== Top goalscorers ==
- Preliminary round: There were 28 goals scored in 6 matches, for an average of 4.67 goals per match.
- Intermediate round: There were 50 goals scored in 12 matches, for an average of 4.17 goals per match.

— Team eliminated / inactive for this stage.

Rank	Player	Team	PR	IR	FT	Total
1	Siarhei Lizunou	(Belarus) Kolos Cherven	6	1	—	7
2	Agegnegnew Salilih	(Israel) Hapoel Bik'at HaYarden	—	4	—	4
2	Rhys Alun Williams	(Wales) Tîm Rhanbarthol Cymru	—	4	—	4
2	Mikhail Karatkevich	(Belarus) Kolos Cherven	3	1	—	4
5	David Cardoso	(Portugal) Lisbon	—	3		3
5	Jan Gojš	(Czech Republic) Zlín	—	3		3
5	Adam Jakubowicz	(Czech Republic) Zlín	—	3		3

Source: UEFA.com
