= Alain Arroyo =

Spanish footballer

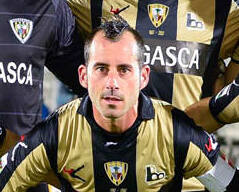
- Arroyo in 2017

Personal information
- Full name: Alain Arroyo Martínez de la Cuadra
- Date of birth: 5 July 1982 (age 44)
- Place of birth: Bilbao, Spain
- Height: 1.71 m (5 ft 7 in)
- Position: Forward

Team information
- Current team: Mirandés (assistant)

Youth career
- Getxo

Senior career*
Years	Team	Apps	(Gls)
2001–2002	Getxo		
2002–2005	Portugalete		
2005–2006	Alavés B	4	(0)
2006	→ Portugalete (loan)	17	(4)
2006–2007	Sestao	35	(6)
2007–2009	Lemona	60	(18)
2009–2010	Guadalajara	34	(10)
2010–2013	Mirandés	104	(20)
2013–2014	Oviedo	27	(6)
2014–2018	Barakaldo	93	(20)
2018–2019	Zamudio	32	(9)
2019–2020	Somorrostro	12	(2)
Total		418	(95)

International career
2005	Basque Country Amateur	11	(1)
2013	Biscay	1	(1)

Managerial career
- 2020–2021: Somorrostro
- 2021–2025: Urduliz
- 2026–: Mirandés (assistant)
- * Club domestic league appearances and goals

Alain Arroyo Martínez de la Cuadra (born 5 July 1982) is a Spanish former professional footballer who played mainly as a forward, and the current assistant manager of CD Mirandés.

== Club career ==
Arroyo was born in Bilbao, Biscay. Starting out in amateur football in his native Basque Country, he scored the winning goal in the final of the 2005 UEFA Regions' Cup while playing for the Basque Country amateur team, and subsequently signed for Deportivo Alavés B of Segunda División B, remaining in that tier the next six seasons representing Club Portugalete (a club he had already played for), Sestao River Club, SD Lemona, CD Guadalajara and CD Mirandés.

In his second season with Mirandés, Arroyo scored a career-best 13 goals to help the Castille and León side achieve promotion to Segunda División for the first time in their history. He played his first match in the competition on 17 August 2012, coming on as a substitute in a 1–0 home loss against SD Huesca, and scored his first goal roughly one month later in a 2–2 draw at Real Murcia.

On 5 June 2013, playing for a Biscay XI in a friendly against Athletic Bilbao, Arroyo scored the last ever goal at the San Mamés Stadium before it was torn down to make way for a new ground.

== Honours ==
Basque Country

- UEFA Regions' Cup: 2005
