= 2005 UEFA Regions' Cup =

UEFA Regions' Cup Poland 2005

Tournament details
- Host country: Poland
- Dates: 3 July – 9 July
- Teams: 8

Final positions
- Champions: (Spain) Basque Country (1st title)
- Runners-up: (Bulgaria) South-West Sofia

The 2005 UEFA Regions' Cup was the fourth UEFA Regions' Cup. It was held in Poland and won by the Basque Country team from Spain, which beat Bulgaria's South-West Sofia 1–0 in the final.

== Preliminary round ==
The eight teams in the preliminary round were drawn into two groups of four, with the fixtures for each group being played in the same country. Group East's matches were played in Romania and those for Group West were played in Slovenia. The two group winners and the best runner-up advanced to the intermediary round.

=== Group East ===
Team	Pld	W	D	L	GF	GA	GD	Pts
Central Slovakia	3	3	0	0	11	1	+10	9
(Romania) Dacia (H)	3	2	0	1	7	2	+5	6
Latvia	3	1	0	2	3	8	−5	3
Estonia	3	0	0	3	2	12	−10	0

20 September 2004
Estonia	0 – 5	Central Slovakia	Strejnicu
Dacia	2 – 0	Latvia	Ploiești
22 September 2004
Latvia	1 – 5	Central Slovakia	Strejnicu
Dacia	5 – 1	Estonia	Câmpina
24 September 2004
Central Slovakia	1 – 0	Dacia	Câmpina
Latvia	2 – 1	Estonia	Ploiești

=== Group West ===
Team	Pld	W	D	L	GF	GA	GD	Pts
(England) Mid-Cheshire	3	2	1	0	8	1	+7	7
Northern Ireland	3	1	1	1	6	3	+3	4
(Slovenia) Primorska (MNZ Koper and Nova Gorica) (H)	3	1	0	2	5	8	−3	3
Malta	3	1	0	2	2	9	−7	3

20 September 2004
Primorska	1 – 4	Mid-Cheshire	Koper
Malta	0 – 4	Northern Ireland	Sežana
22 September 2004
Primorska	1 – 2	Malta	Izola
Mid-Cheshire	0 – 0	Northern Ireland	Dekani
24 September 2004
Northern Ireland	2 – 3	Primorska	Sežana
Malta	0 – 4	Mid-Cheshire	Koper

== Intermediary round ==
The 29 teams which went straight through to the intermediary round were joined by England's Mid-Cheshire, the Central team of Slovakia and the Romanian Dacia team. The 32 teams were drawn into eight groups of four, with the following countries hosting each group's matches:

Group 1 – France
Group 2 – Croatia
Group 3 – Bosnia and Herzegovina
Group 4 – Czech Republic
Group 5 – Ukraine
Group 6 – Poland
Group 7 – Bulgaria
Group 8 – Hungary

The winners of each group qualified for the final tournament.

=== Group 1 ===
Team	Pld	W	D	L	GF	GA	GD	Pts
(Spain) Basque Country	3	2	1	0	9	1	+8	7
(Belgium) Kempen	3	1	2	0	6	3	+3	5
(France) Nord-Pas-de-Calais (H)	3	1	1	1	4	5	−1	4
(Scotland) Highlands and Islands	3	0	0	3	0	10	−10	0

16 November 2004
Highlands and Islands	0 – 3	Kempen	Rang-du-Fliers
Nord-Pas de Calais	0 – 3	Basque Country	Le Touquet
18 November 2004
Basque Country	1 – 1	Kempen	Écuires
Nord-Pas de Calais	2 – 0	Highlands and Islands	Boulogne-sur-Mer
20 November 2004
Kempen	2 – 2	Nord-Pas de Calais	Berck
Basque Country	5 – 0	Highlands and Islands	Berck

=== Group 2 ===
Team	Pld	W	D	L	GF	GA	GD	Pts
(Romania) Dacia	3	3	0	0	18	5	+13	9
(Croatia) Rijeka (H)	3	1	0	2	8	4	+4	3
Northwestern Switzerland	3	1	0	2	6	8	−2	3
Liechtenstein	3	1	0	2	3	18	−15	3

14 March 2005
Rijeka	6 – 0	Liechtenstein	Labin
Dacia	5 – 3	Northwestern Switzerland	Čavle
16 March 2005
Rijeka	1 – 2	Northwestern Switzerland	Čavle
Liechtenstein	1 – 11	Dacia	Kostrena
18 March 2005
Dacia	2 – 1	Rijeka	Krk
Northwestern Switzerland	1 – 2	Liechtenstein	Novi Vinodolski

=== Group 3 ===
Team	Pld	W	D	L	GF	GA	GD	Pts
Republic of Ireland	3	2	1	0	10	4	+6	7
(England) Mid-Cheshire	3	2	0	1	5	5	0	6
(Bosnia and Herzegovina) Semberija (H)	3	1	1	1	5	5	0	4
San Marino	3	0	0	3	1	7	−6	0

8 November 2004
Semberija	1 – 2	Mid-Cheshire	Bijeljina
San Marino	0 – 4	Republic of Ireland	Ugljevik
10 November 2004
Mid-Cheshire	2 – 4	Republic of Ireland	Ugljevik
Semberija	2 – 1	San Marino	Bijeljina
12 November 2004
Mid-Cheshire	1 – 0	San Marino	Bijeljina
Republic of Ireland	2 – 2	Semberija	Ugljevik

=== Group 4 ===
Team	Pld	W	D	L	GF	GA	GD	Pts
(Czech Republic) Brno (H)	3	1	2	0	8	2	+6	5
(Sweden) Väsby	3	1	2	0	3	2	+1	5
(Portugal) Portalegre	3	0	3	0	1	1	0	3
(Netherlands) District Zuid 1	3	0	1	2	1	8	−7	1

15 October 2004
Brno	1 – 1	Väsby	Břeclav
Portalegre	0 – 0	District Zuid 1	Lanžhot
17 October 2004
Brno	1 – 1	Portalegre	Mikulov
Väsby	2 – 1	District Zuid 1	Hustopeče
19 October 2004
District Zuid 1	0 – 6	Brno	Velké Pavlovice
Väsby	0 – 0	Portalegre	Lanžhot

=== Group 5 ===
Team	Pld	W	D	L	GF	GA	GD	Pts
(Ukraine) KZESO Kakhovka (H)	3	3	0	0	15	3	+12	9
(Georgia (country)) Tbilisi	3	2	0	1	10	5	+5	6
(Moldova) Chişinău	3	1	0	2	5	14	−9	3
(Belarus) Brest	3	0	0	3	3	11	−8	0

22 August 2004
Tbilisi	5 – 1	Brest	Kakhovka
KZESO Kakhovka	8 – 2	Chişinău	Kakhovka
24 August 2004
Chişinău	0 – 5	Tbilisi	Kakhovka
KZESO Kakhovka	3 – 1	Brest	Kakhovka
26 August 2004
Brest	1 – 3	Chişinău	Kakhovka
Tbilisi	0 – 4	KZESO Kakhovka	Kakhovka

=== Group 6 ===
Team	Pld	W	D	L	GF	GA	GD	Pts
Lesser Poland (H)	3	2	1	0	18	3	+15	7
Southwest Germany	3	2	0	1	5	6	−1	6
(Serbia and Montenegro) Eastern Serbia	3	1	1	1	8	6	+2	4
(Azerbaijan) Beyləqan	3	0	0	3	3	19	−16	0

1 August 2004
Lesser Poland	13 – 1	Beyləqan	Wolbrom
Eastern Serbia	2 – 3	Southwest Germany	Proszowice
3 August 2004
Lesser Poland	2 – 2	Eastern Serbia	Brzesko
Beyləqan	1 – 2	Southwest Germany	Proszowice
5 August 2004
Southwest Germany	0 – 3	Lesser Poland	Brzesko
Beyləqan	1 – 4	Eastern Serbia	Wolbrom

=== Group 7 ===
Team	Pld	W	D	L	GF	GA	GD	Pts
(Bulgaria) South-West Sofia (H)	3	2	1	0	8	2	+6	7
(Italy) Tuscany	3	2	0	1	8	3	+5	6
(Russia) Chernozemie	3	0	2	1	4	7	−3	2
(Finland) Järvenpää	3	0	1	2	1	9	−8	1

21 September 2004
Chernozemie	1 – 4	Tuscany	Pravets
South-West Sofia	4 – 0	Järvenpää	Botevgrad
23 September 2004
Tuscany	4 – 0	Järvenpää	Pravets
Chernozemie	2 – 2	South-West Sofia	Botevgrad
25 September 2004
Tuscany	0 – 2	South-West Sofia	Botevgrad
Chernozemie	1 – 1	Järvenpää	Pravets

=== Group 8 ===
Team	Pld	W	D	L	GF	GA	GD	Pts
Central Slovakia	3	3	0	0	10	1	+9	9
(Hungary) Tisza (H)	3	2	0	1	7	4	+3	6
(Greece) Achaea	3	0	1	2	1	5	−4	1
(Lithuania) Kvintencija	3	0	1	2	2	10	−8	1

19 April 2005
Tisza	1 – 3	Central Slovakia	Tiszaújváros
Kvintencija	1 – 1	Achaea	Tiszaújváros
21 April 2005
Tisza	4 – 1	Kvintencija	Tiszaújváros
Central Slovakia	2 – 0	Achaea	Tiszaújváros
23 April 2005
Achaea	0 – 2	Tisza	Tiszaújváros
Central Slovakia	5 – 0	Kvintencija	Tiszaújváros

== Final tournament ==
Poland was chosen to host the final tournament, with matches being played from 3 July to 9 July 2005.

=== Group stage ===
The eight intermediary group winners were drawn into two groups of four, with the two group winners advancing to the final.

==== Group A ====
Team	Pld	W	D	L	GF	GA	GD	Pts
(Bulgaria) South-West Sofia	3	2	1	0	9	3	+6	7
Central Slovakia	3	1	2	0	9	3	+6	5
Lesser Poland (H)	3	1	1	1	4	6	−2	4
(Czech Republic) Brno	3	0	0	3	2	12	−10	0

3 July 2005
South-West Sofia	3 – 1	Brno	Zabierzów
Lesser Poland	1 – 1	Central Slovakia	Brzesko
5 July 2005
Central Slovakia	6 – 0	Brno	Proszowice
Lesser Poland	0 – 4	South-West Sofia	Libiąż
7 July 2005
Central Slovakia	2 – 2	South-West Sofia	Zabierzów
Brno	1 – 3	Lesser Poland	Wolbrom

==== Group B ====
Team	Pld	W	D	L	GF	GA	GD	Pts
(Spain) Basque Country	3	2	0	1	7	5	+2	6
(Ukraine) KZESO Kakhovka	3	2	0	1	8	7	+1	6
Republic of Ireland	3	1	1	1	6	6	0	4
(Romania) Dacia	3	0	1	2	3	6	−3	1

3 July 2005
Dacia	1 – 1	Republic of Ireland	Proszowice
Basque Country	4 – 1	KZESO Kakhovka	Wolbrom
5 July 2005
Republic of Ireland	2 – 4	KZESO Kakhovka	Brzesko
Dacia	1 – 2	Basque Country	Wolbrom
7 July 2005
Republic of Ireland	3 – 1	Basque Country	Brzesko
KZESO Kakhovka	3 – 1	Dacia	Libiąż

=== Final ===
9 July 2005

South-West Sofia (Bulgaria)	0 – 1	(Spain) Basque Country
	(Report)	Arroyo 33'

KS Proszowianka Stadium, Proszowice
Attendance: ~1,300
Referee: Novo Panić (Bosnia and Herzegovina)

2005 UEFA Regions' Cup
Winners

Basque Country

== See also ==
- UEFA Regions' Cup
