= Kněžpole =

- Municipality
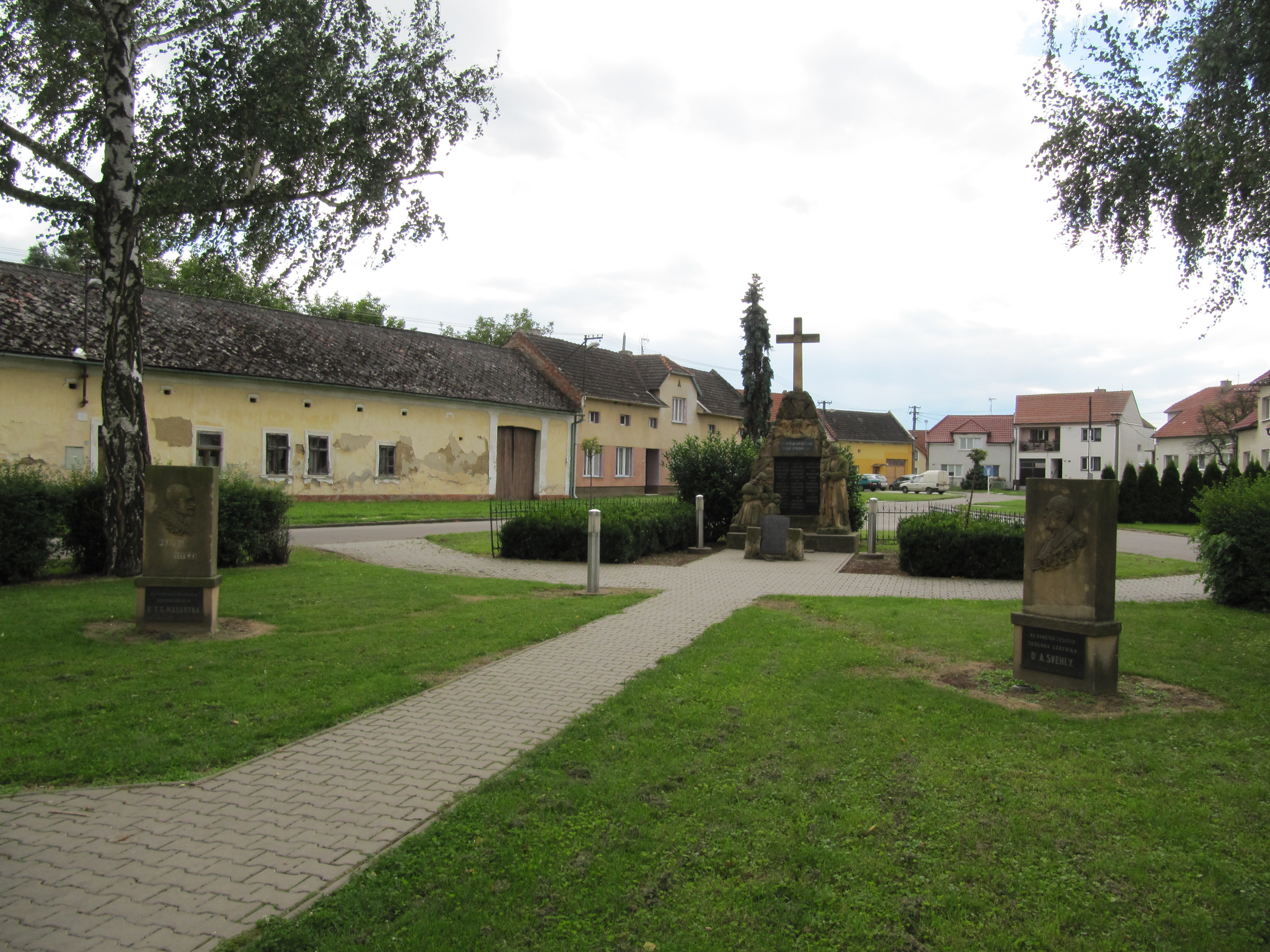
- A park in Kněžpole

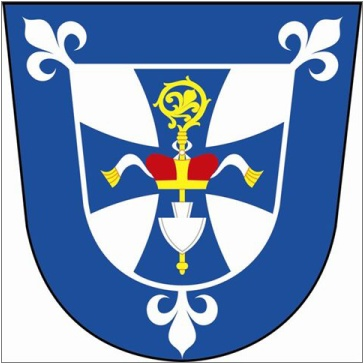
- Flag Coat of arms

- Location in the Czech Republic
- Coordinates: 49°5′55″N 17°31′0″E
- Country: Czech Republic
- Region: Zlín
- District: Uherské Hradiště
- First mentioned: 1220

Area
  - Total: 9.27 km^{2} (3.58 sq mi)
- Elevation: 180 m (590 ft)

Population (2026-01-01)
  - Total: 1,039
  - Density: 112/km^{2} (290/sq mi)
- Time zone: UTC+1 (CET)
  - Summer (DST): UTC+2 (CEST)
- Postal code: 687 12
- Website: www.knezpole.cz

Kněžpole is a municipality and village in Uherské Hradiště District in the Zlín Region of the Czech Republic. It has about 1,000 inhabitants.

== Geography ==
Kněžpole is located about 4 kilometres (2 mi) northeast of Uherské Hradiště and 17 km (11 mi) southwest of Zlín. It lies in the northern part of the Lower Morava Valley. The highest point is the Rovnice hill at 340 m (1,120 ft) above sea level. The rivers Morava and Březnice flow through the municipality (outside the village) and meet at its eastern tip.

== Demographics ==
Historical population
Year	Pop.	±%
1869	603	—
1880	664	+10.1%
1890	687	+3.5%
1900	714	+3.9%
1910	804	+12.6%
1921	832	+3.5%
1930	788	−5.3%
1950	849	+7.7%
1961	979	+15.3%
1970	1,009	+3.1%
1980	1,098	+8.8%
1991	1,025	−6.6%
2001	1,059	+3.3%
2011	1,098	+3.7%
2021	1,074	−2.2%
Source: Censuses
