= 2001 UEFA Regions' Cup =

UEFA Regions' Cup Czech Republic 2001

Tournament details
- Host country: Czech Republic
- Dates: 18 June – 24 June
- Teams: 8

Final positions
- Champions: (Czech Republic) Central Moravia (1st title)
- Runners-up: (Portugal) Braga

The 2001 UEFA Regions' Cup was the second UEFA Regions' Cup. It was held in the Czech Republic and won by the Central Moravia team from the host nation, which beat Portugal's Braga 4–2 on penalties, after drawing 2–2 after extra time, in the final.

== Preliminary round ==
The 35 teams entered were drawn into eight groups of four and one group of three, with the following countries hosting each group's matches:

Group 1 – Bulgaria
Group 2 – Czech Republic
Group 3 – Finland
Group 4 – France
Group 5 – Luxembourg
Group 6 – Malta
Group 7 – Russia
Group 8 – San Marino
Group 9 – Bosnia and Herzegovina

Seven group winners automatically qualified for the final tournament, with the two "worst winners" playing against each other in a playoff for the remaining place.

=== Group 1 ===
Team	Pld	W	D	L	GF	GA	GD	Pts
(Bulgaria) Plovdiv (H)	3	2	1	0	7	4	+3	7
(Ukraine) Odessa	3	2	1	0	6	3	+3	7
(Slovakia) East	3	1	0	2	3	5	−2	3
(Hungary) Bakony	3	0	0	3	3	7	−4	0

All matches played in Pleven.

22 October 2000
Odessa	2 – 1	East
Plovdiv	3 – 2	Bakony
24 October 2000
Bakony	0 – 2	Odessa
East	0 – 2	Plovdiv
26 October 2000
East	2 – 1	Bakony
Odessa	2 – 2	Plovdiv

=== Group 2 ===
Team	Pld	W	D	L	GF	GA	GD	Pts
(Czech Republic) Central Moravia (H)	3	3	0	0	12	2	+10	9
Latvia	3	2	0	1	6	4	+2	6
(Moldova) Chişinău	3	0	1	2	0	3	−3	1
(Belarus) Gomel	3	0	1	2	1	10	−9	1

23 September 2000
Latvia	1 – 0	Chişinău
Central Moravia	7 – 0	Gomel
25 September 2000
Gomel	1 – 3	Latvia
Chişinău	0 – 2	Central Moravia
27 September 2000
Chişinău	0 – 0	Gomel
Latvia	2 – 3	Central Moravia

=== Group 3 ===
Team	Pld	W	D	L	GF	GA	GD	Pts
Republic of Ireland	3	3	0	0	7	2	+5	9
(Poland) Masovia	3	1	1	1	2	2	0	4
(Finland) East (H)	3	1	0	2	2	5	−3	3
(Lithuania) Marijampolė	3	0	1	2	0	2	−2	1

All matches played in Joensuu.

3 September 2000
Marijampolė	0 – 0	Masovia
East	1 – 4	Republic of Ireland
5 September 2000
Republic of Ireland	1 – 0	Marijampolė
Masovia	1 – 0	East
7 September 2000
Marijampolė	0 – 1	East
Masovia	1 – 2	Republic of Ireland

=== Group 4 ===
Team	Pld	W	D	L	GF	GA	GD	Pts
(Spain) Madrid	3	3	0	0	17	5	+12	9
(Belgium) South	3	1	1	1	5	8	−3	4
(France) Méditerranée (H)	3	1	0	2	7	9	−2	3
(Switzerland) Zürich	3	0	1	2	6	13	−7	1

Matches played in Fos-sur-Mer, Martigues and Istres.

28 October 2000
Méditerranée	1 – 3	South
Madrid	7 – 3	Zürich
30 October 2000
South	1 – 1	Zürich
Méditerranée	1 – 4	Madrid
1 November 2000
South	1 – 6	Madrid
Zürich	2 – 5	Méditerranée

=== Group 5 ===
Team	Pld	W	D	L	GF	GA	GD	Pts
(Netherlands) District Midden	3	1	2	0	5	1	+4	5
Central Scotland	3	1	1	1	5	8	−3	4
Northern Ireland	3	1	1	1	8	4	+4	4
Luxembourg (H)	3	0	2	1	2	7	−5	2

29 September 2000
Northern Ireland	2 – 3	Central Scotland
Luxembourg	0 – 0	District Midden
1 October 2000
Northern Ireland	5 – 0	Luxembourg
District Midden	4 – 0	Central Scotland
3 October 2000
Central Scotland	2 – 2	Luxembourg
Northern Ireland	1 – 1	District Midden

=== Group 6 ===
Team	Pld	W	D	L	GF	GA	GD	Pts
(Croatia) Dalmatia	2	2	0	0	2	0	+2	6
(Italy) Abruzzo	2	1	0	1	5	1	+4	3
Malta (H)	2	0	0	2	0	6	−6	0
Israel	withdrew							

7 December 2000
Malta	0 – 1	Dalmatia
9 December 2000
Abruzzo	5 – 0	Malta
11 December 2000
Dalmatia	1 – 0	Abruzzo

=== Group 7 ===
Team	Pld	W	D	L	GF	GA	GD	Pts
(Federal Republic of Yugoslavia) Vojvodina	3	2	1	0	11	1	+10	7
(Russia) Centre (H)	3	2	1	0	10	2	+8	7
(Greece) Kilkis	3	1	0	2	5	8	−3	3
(Estonia) North	3	0	0	3	2	17	−15	0

9 August 2000
Kilkis	0 – 2	Vojvodina
Centre	5 – 0	North
11 August 2000
North	0 – 8	Vojvodina
Kilkis	1 – 4	Centre
13 August 2000
Kilkis	4 – 2	North
Vojvodina	1 – 1	Centre

=== Group 8 ===
Team	Pld	W	D	L	GF	GA	GD	Pts
(Portugal) Braga	3	3	0	0	8	0	+8	9
(Germany) Schleswig-Holstein	3	2	0	1	5	2	+3	6
(Slovenia) MNZ Celje	3	1	0	2	3	7	−4	3
San Marino (H)	3	0	0	3	1	8	−7	0

10 October 2000
Braga	2 – 0	MNZ Celje
San Marino	0 – 1	Schleswig-Holstein
12 October 2000
San Marino	0 – 5	Braga
MNZ Celje	1 – 4	Schleswig-Holstein
14 October 2000
MNZ Celje	2 – 1	San Marino
Braga	1 – 0	Schleswig-Holstein

=== Group 9 ===
Team	Pld	W	D	L	GF	GA	GD	Pts
Bosnia and Herzegovina (H)	3	2	1	0	4	1	+3	7
(Romania) Dacia	3	1	1	1	5	2	+3	4
(Georgia (country)) Kakheti	3	1	1	1	2	3	−1	4
(Azerbaijan) Western	3	0	1	2	3	8	−5	1

18 September 2000
Kakheti	0 – 0	Dacia
Bosnia and Herzegovina	1 – 1	Western
20 September 2000
Bosnia and Herzegovina	2 – 0	Kakheti
Western	1 – 5	Dacia
22 September 2000
Dacia	0 – 1	Bosnia and Herzegovina
Western	1 – 2	Kakheti

== Playoff ==
The two teams which won their groups with the fewest available points went through to compete in a playoff for the remaining final tournament place. In the event of multiple teams sharing the same number of points, the points margin and score between first and second places was taken into account. The two legs were played in both teams' home regions.

Team 1	Agg.	Team 2	1st leg	2nd leg
Vojvodina (Federal Republic of Yugoslavia)	3–0	(Netherlands) District Midden	2–0	1–0

First leg

11 April 2001
Vojvodina	2 – 0	District Midden

Second leg

25 April 2001
Midden	0 – 1	Vojvodina

== Final tournament ==
The Czech Republic was chosen to host the final tournament, with matches being played from 18 June to 24 June 2001.

=== Group stage ===
The seven automatic preliminary group winners and the playoff winner Vojvodina were drawn into two groups of four, with the two group winners advancing to the final.

==== Group A ====
Team	Pld	W	D	L	GF	GA	GD	Pts
(Portugal) Braga	3	2	0	1	4	3	+1	6
(Spain) Madrid	3	2	0	1	5	1	+4	6
(Croatia) Dalmatia	3	1	0	2	3	7	−4	3
(Federal Republic of Yugoslavia) Vojvodina	3	1	0	2	5	6	−1	3

18 June 2001
Madrid	2 – 0	Dalmatia	Zlín
Braga	0 – 3	Vojvodina	Kyjov
20 June 2001
Madrid	0 – 1	Braga	Služovice
Dalmatia	3 – 2	Vojvodina	Bzenec
22 June 2001
Vojvodina	0 – 3	Madrid	Bystřice pod Hostýnem
Dalmatia	0 – 3	Braga	Bojkovice

==== Group B ====
Team	Pld	W	D	L	GF	GA	GD	Pts
(Czech Republic) Central Moravia (H)	3	2	1	0	4	0	+4	7
(Bulgaria) Plovdiv	3	2	0	1	5	3	+2	6
Bosnia and Herzegovina	3	1	1	1	3	3	0	4
Republic of Ireland	3	0	0	3	0	6	−6	0

18 June 2001
Central Moravia	0 – 0	Bosnia and Herzegovina	Brumov
Republic of Ireland	0 – 2	Plovdiv	Šardice
20 June 2001
Central Moravia	2 – 0	Republic of Ireland	Veselí nad Moravou
Bosnia and Herzegovina	1 – 3	Plovdiv	Kněžpole
22 June 2001
Plovdiv	0 – 2	Central Moravia	Kyjov
Bosnia and Herzegovina	2 – 0	Republic of Ireland	Kroměříž

=== Final ===
24 June 2001

Braga (Portugal)	2 – 2 (aet) (2 – 4 p)	(Czech Republic) Central Moravia
Ferreira 55'; Freitas 84'	(Report); Report Story	David 12'; Svach 90+4' (pen.)

Letná Stadion, Zlín
Attendance: 2,820
Referee: Tony Chapron (France)

2001 UEFA Regions' Cup
Winners

Central Moravia

== See also ==
- UEFA Regions' Cup
