= 2021 UEFA Regions' Cup =

Tournament details
- Dates: Cancelled
- Teams: Final tournament: 8 Total: 36 (from 36 associations)

The 2021 UEFA Regions' Cup was originally to be held as the 12th edition of the UEFA Regions' Cup, a football competition for amateur teams in Europe organized by UEFA, before being cancelled due to the COVID-19 pandemic.

The final tournament of this edition would originally be held in June 2021, with the qualifying rounds originally taking place in 2020. However, on 17 June 2020, UEFA announced that the tournament had been cancelled due to the COVID-19 pandemic. Lower Silesia from Poland were the title holders.

== Teams ==
A total of 36 teams entered the tournament. Each of the 55 UEFA member associations could enter a regional amateur representative team which qualified through a national qualifying competition, or when applicable, their national amateur representative team.

Associations were ranked according to their UEFA coefficients, computed based on results of the last three seasons (2015, 2017, 2019), to decide on the round their teams entered and their seeding pots in the preliminary and intermediate round draws. The top 28 associations entered the intermediate round, while the bottom 8 associations (ranked 29–36) entered the preliminary round.

The draws for the preliminary and intermediate rounds was held on 3 December 2019, 14:00 CET (UTC+1), at the UEFA headquarters in Nyon, Switzerland. The mechanism of the draws for each round was as follows:

- In the preliminary round, the eight teams were drawn into two groups of four without any seeding.
- In the intermediate round, the 32 teams were drawn into eight groups of four. Each group contained one team from Pot A, one team from Pot B, one team from Pot C, and either one team from Pot D or one of the four teams which advanced from the preliminary round (whose identity was not known at the time of the draw):
  - Preliminary round Group A winner would be assigned to Group 1.
  - Preliminary round Group B winner would be assigned to Group 2.
  - Preliminary round Group A runner-up would be assigned to Group 3.
  - Preliminary round Group B runner-up would be assigned to Group 4.
  - The four teams from Pot D would be drawn to Groups 5–8.

Based on the decisions taken by the UEFA Emergency Panel, teams from Russia and Ukraine could not be drawn in the same group.

The hosts for each group in the preliminary and intermediate rounds would be selected after the draw.

Qualified teams for 2021 UEFA Regions' Cup
Entry round	Rank	Association	Team	Qualifying competition	Coeff.	Pot
Intermediate round	1	Turkey			14.333	A
Intermediate round	2	Croatia			14.000	A
Intermediate round	3	Republic of Ireland			12.667	A
Intermediate round	4	Poland	Kuyavian–Pomeranian Voivodeship	National Final Tournament	12.333	A
Intermediate round	5	Germany			12.333	A
Intermediate round	6	Czech Republic			12.333	A
Intermediate round	7	Spain	Galicia	2019–20 Spanish stage of the UEFA Regions' Cup	12.000	A
Intermediate round	8	Russia			11.667	A
Intermediate round	9	France			10.667	B
Intermediate round	10	Portugal			10.333	B
Intermediate round	11	Ukraine			10.000	B
Intermediate round	12	Hungary			9.333	B
Intermediate round	13	Italy			9.000	B
Intermediate round	14	Slovakia			8.667	B
Intermediate round	15	Bulgaria			8.000	B
Intermediate round	16	Northern Ireland			8.000	B
Intermediate round	17	Bosnia and Herzegovina			8.000	C
Intermediate round	18	Switzerland			7.667	C
Intermediate round	19	Serbia			7.667	C
Intermediate round	20	England			6.667	C
Intermediate round	21	Lithuania			5.833	C
Intermediate round	22	Israel			5.833	C
Intermediate round	23	Romania			5.000	C
Intermediate round	24	Wales			5.000	C
Intermediate round	25	Finland			5.000	D
Intermediate round	26	San Marino	San Marino	National amateur team	4.667	D
Intermediate round	27	Slovenia			4.333	D
Intermediate round	28	Moldova			4.333	D
Preliminary round	29	Malta	Gozo	Regional amateur team	4.333	1
Preliminary round	30	North Macedonia			4.167	1
Preliminary round	31	Sweden			4.000	1
Preliminary round	32	Belarus			3.333	1
Preliminary round	33	Azerbaijan			3.000	1
Preliminary round	34	Kazakhstan			2.000	1
Preliminary round	35	Estonia	Saue JK	2018 Estonian Small Cup	1.000	1
Preliminary round	36	Georgia			0.333	1

Associations which did not enter
Albania	Andorra	Armenia	Austria	Belgium
Cyprus	Denmark	Faroe Islands	Gibraltar	Greece
Iceland	Kosovo	Latvia	Liechtenstein	Luxembourg
Montenegro	Netherlands	Norway	Scotland	

== Format ==
In the preliminary round and intermediate round, each group is played as a round-robin mini-tournament at one of the teams selected as hosts after the draw.

In the final tournament, the eight qualified teams play a group stage (two groups of four) followed by the final between the group winners, at a host selected by UEFA from one of the teams.

== Preliminary round ==
The winners and runners-up of each group advance to the intermediate round to join the 28 teams which receive byes. The preliminary round was originally to be played by 2 August 2020, but was postponed due to the COVID-19 pandemic before being cancelled.

Times are CEST (UTC+2), as listed by UEFA (local times, if different, are in parentheses).

=== Group A ===
Pos	Team	Pld	W	D	L	GF	GA	GD	Pts	Qualification
1	(Georgia (country)) Team 1	0	0	0	0	0	0	0	0	Intermediate round
2	(Estonia) Saue JK	0	0	0	0	0	0	0	0	Intermediate round
3	(Sweden) Team 3 (H)	0	0	0	0	0	0	0	0	
4	(Azerbaijan) Team 4	0	0	0	0	0	0	0	0	

Source: UEFA
Rules for classification: Tiebreakers
(H) Hosts
21 July 2020

Team 1 (Georgia (country))	Cancelled	(Azerbaijan) Team 4
	Report

21 July 2020

Team 3 (Sweden)	Cancelled	(Estonia) Saue JK
	Report

24 July 2020

Team 1 (Georgia (country))	Cancelled	(Sweden) Team 3
	Report

24 July 2020

Saue JK (Estonia)	Cancelled	(Azerbaijan) Team 4
	Report

27 July 2020

Saue JK (Estonia)	Cancelled	(Georgia (country)) Team 1
	Report

27 July 2020

Team 4 (Azerbaijan)	Cancelled	(Sweden) Team 3
	Report

=== Group B ===
Pos	Team	Pld	W	D	L	GF	GA	GD	Pts	Qualification
1	(Kazakhstan) Team 1	0	0	0	0	0	0	0	0	Intermediate round
2	(Malta) Gozo (H)	0	0	0	0	0	0	0	0	Intermediate round
3	(Belarus) Team 3	0	0	0	0	0	0	0	0	
4	(North Macedonia) Team 4	0	0	0	0	0	0	0	0	

Source: UEFA
Rules for classification: Tiebreakers
(H) Hosts
24 May 2020

Team 1 (Kazakhstan)	Cancelled	(North Macedonia) Team 4
	Report

24 May 2020

Team 3 (Belarus)	Cancelled	(Malta) Gozo
	Report

27 May 2020

Team 1 (Kazakhstan)	Cancelled	(Belarus) Team 3
	Report

27 May 2020

Gozo (Malta)	Cancelled	(North Macedonia) Team 4
	Report

30 May 2020

Gozo (Malta)	Cancelled	(Kazakhstan) Team 1
	Report

30 May 2020

Team 4 (North Macedonia)	Cancelled	(Belarus) Team 3
	Report

== Intermediate round ==
The winners of each group advance to the final tournament. The intermediate round was originally to be played by 13 December 2020.

Times up to 24 October 2020 are CEST (UTC+2), thereafter times are CET (UTC+1), as listed by UEFA (local times, if different, are in parentheses).

=== Group 1 ===
Pos	Team	Pld	W	D	L	GF	GA	GD	Pts	Qualification
1	(Czech Republic) Team 1	0	0	0	0	0	0	0	0	Final tournament
2	(Ukraine) Team 2	0	0	0	0	0	0	0	0	
3	(Bosnia and Herzegovina) Team 3 (H)	0	0	0	0	0	0	0	0	
4	Preliminary round Group A winner	0	0	0	0	0	0	0	0	

Source: UEFA
Rules for classification: Tiebreakers
(H) Hosts
23 September 2020

Team 1 (Czech Republic)	Cancelled	Preliminary round Group A winner

23 September 2020

Team 3 (Bosnia and Herzegovina)	Cancelled	(Ukraine) Team 2

26 September 2020

Team 1 (Czech Republic)	Cancelled	(Bosnia and Herzegovina) Team 3

26 September 2020

Team 2 (Ukraine)	Cancelled	Preliminary round Group A winner

29 September 2020

Team 2 (Ukraine)	Cancelled	(Czech Republic) Team 1

29 September 2020

Preliminary round Group A winner	Cancelled	(Bosnia and Herzegovina) Team 3

=== Group 2 ===
Pos	Team	Pld	W	D	L	GF	GA	GD	Pts	Qualification
1	(Croatia) Team 1	0	0	0	0	0	0	0	0	Final tournament
2	(Italy) Team 2 (H)	0	0	0	0	0	0	0	0	
3	(Lithuania) Team 3	0	0	0	0	0	0	0	0	
4	Preliminary round Group B winner	0	0	0	0	0	0	0	0	

Source: UEFA
Rules for classification: Tiebreakers
(H) Hosts
9 October 2020

Team 1 (Croatia)	Cancelled	Preliminary round Group B winner

9 October 2020

Team 3 (Lithuania)	Cancelled	(Italy) Team 2

12 October 2020

Team 1 (Croatia)	Cancelled	(Lithuania) Team 3

12 October 2020

Team 2 (Italy)	Cancelled	Preliminary round Group B winner

15 October 2020

Team 2 (Italy)	Cancelled	(Croatia) Team 1

15 October 2020

Preliminary round Group B winner	Cancelled	(Lithuania) Team 3

=== Group 3 ===
Pos	Team	Pld	W	D	L	GF	GA	GD	Pts	Qualification
1	(Russia) CFCB	0	0	0	0	0	0	0	0	Final tournament
2	(Bulgaria) Team 2 (H)	0	0	0	0	0	0	0	0	
3	(Wales) Team 3	0	0	0	0	0	0	0	0	
4	Preliminary round Group A runner-up	0	0	0	0	0	0	0	0	

Source: UEFA
Rules for classification: Tiebreakers
(H) Hosts
22 September 2020

Team 1 (Russia)	Cancelled	Preliminary round Group A runner-up

22 September 2020

Team 3 (Wales)	Cancelled	(Bulgaria) Team 2

25 September 2020

Team 1 (Russia)	Cancelled	(Wales) Team 3

25 September 2020

Team 2 (Bulgaria)	Cancelled	Preliminary round Group A runner-up

28 September 2020

Team 2 (Bulgaria)	Cancelled	(Russia) Team 1

28 September 2020

Preliminary round Group A runner-up	Cancelled	(Wales) Team 3

=== Group 4 ===
Pos	Team	Pld	W	D	L	GF	GA	GD	Pts	Qualification
1	(Spain) Galicia	0	0	0	0	0	0	0	0	Final tournament
2	(Northern Ireland) Team 2	0	0	0	0	0	0	0	0	
3	(Serbia) Team 3	0	0	0	0	0	0	0	0	
4	Preliminary round Group B runner-up	0	0	0	0	0	0	0	0	

Source: UEFA
Rules for classification: Tiebreakers
2020

Galicia (Spain)	Cancelled	Preliminary round Group B runner-up

2020

Team 3 (Serbia)	Cancelled	(Northern Ireland) Team 2

2020

Galicia (Spain)	Cancelled	(Serbia) Team 3

2020

Team 2 (Northern Ireland)	Cancelled	Preliminary round Group B runner-up

2020

Team 2 (Northern Ireland)	Cancelled	(Spain) Galicia

2020

Preliminary round Group B runner-up	Cancelled	(Serbia) Team 3

=== Group 5 ===
Pos	Team	Pld	W	D	L	GF	GA	GD	Pts	Qualification
1	(Turkey) Team 1	0	0	0	0	0	0	0	0	Final tournament
2	(Slovakia) Team 2	0	0	0	0	0	0	0	0	
3	(Israel) Team 3	0	0	0	0	0	0	0	0	
4	San Marino (H)	0	0	0	0	0	0	0	0	

Source: UEFA
Rules for classification: Tiebreakers
(H) Hosts
2020

Team 1 (Turkey)	Cancelled	San Marino

2020

Team 3 (Israel)	Cancelled	(Slovakia) Team 2

2020

Team 1 (Turkey)	Cancelled	(Israel) Team 3

2020

Team 2 (Slovakia)	Cancelled	San Marino

2020

Team 2 (Slovakia)	Cancelled	(Turkey) Team 1

2020

San Marino	Cancelled	(Israel) Team 3

=== Group 6 ===
Pos	Team	Pld	W	D	L	GF	GA	GD	Pts	Qualification
1	(Germany) Team 1 (H)	0	0	0	0	0	0	0	0	Final tournament
2	(Hungary) Team 2	0	0	0	0	0	0	0	0	
3	(Switzerland) Team 3	0	0	0	0	0	0	0	0	
4	(Moldova) Team 4	0	0	0	0	0	0	0	0	

Source: UEFA
Rules for classification: Tiebreakers
(H) Hosts
2020

Team 1 (Germany)	Cancelled	(Moldova) Team 4

2020

Team 3 (Switzerland)	Cancelled	(Hungary) Team 2

2020

Team 1 (Germany)	Cancelled	(Switzerland) Team 3

2020

Team 2 (Hungary)	Cancelled	(Moldova) Team 4

2020

Team 2 (Hungary)	Cancelled	(Germany) Team 1

2020

Team 4 (Moldova)	Cancelled	(Switzerland) Team 3

=== Group 7 ===
Pos	Team	Pld	W	D	L	GF	GA	GD	Pts	Qualification
1	(Poland) Kuyavian-Pomeranian Voivodeship	0	0	0	0	0	0	0	0	Final tournament
2	(Portugal) Team 2	0	0	0	0	0	0	0	0	
3	(Romania) Team 3 (H)	0	0	0	0	0	0	0	0	
4	(Finland) Team 4	0	0	0	0	0	0	0	0	

Source: UEFA
Rules for classification: Tiebreakers
(H) Hosts
2020

Kuyavian-Pomeranian Voivodeship (Poland)	Cancelled	(Finland) Team 4

2020

Team 3 (Romania)	Cancelled	(Portugal) Team 2

2020

Kuyavian-Pomeranian Voivodeship (Poland)	Cancelled	(Romania) Team 3

2020

Team 2 (Portugal)	Cancelled	(Finland) Team 4

2020

Team 2 (Portugal)	Cancelled	(Poland) Kuyavian-Pomeranian Voivodeship

2020

Team 4 (Finland)	Cancelled	(Romania) Team 3

=== Group 8 ===
Pos	Team	Pld	W	D	L	GF	GA	GD	Pts	Qualification
1	(Republic of Ireland) Team 1	0	0	0	0	0	0	0	0	Final tournament
2	(France) Team 2	0	0	0	0	0	0	0	0	
3	(England) Team 3	0	0	0	0	0	0	0	0	
4	(Slovenia) Team 4	0	0	0	0	0	0	0	0	

Source: UEFA
Rules for classification: Tiebreakers
2020

Team 1 (Republic of Ireland)	Cancelled	(Slovenia) Team 4

2020

Team 3 (England)	Cancelled	(France) Team 2

2020

Team 1 (Republic of Ireland)	Cancelled	(England) Team 3

2020

Team 2 (France)	Cancelled	(Slovenia) Team 4

2020

Team 2 (France)	Cancelled	(Republic of Ireland) Team 1

2020

Team 4 (Slovenia)	Cancelled	(England) Team 3

== Final tournament ==
In principle, the final tournament would originally take place in the last two weeks of June 2021.

=== Venues ===
The hosts of the final tournament would originally be selected by UEFA from the eight qualified teams.

=== Qualified teams ===
The following eight teams qualify for the final tournament.

Team	Method of qualification	Date of qualification
TBD	Intermediate round Group 1 winners	29 September 2020 (or 26 September 2020)
TBD	Intermediate round Group 2 winners	15 October 2020 (or 12 October 2020)
TBD	Intermediate round Group 3 winners	28 September 2020 (or 25 September 2020)
TBD	Intermediate round Group 4 winners	2020
TBD	Intermediate round Group 5 winners	2020
TBD	Intermediate round Group 6 winners	2020
TBD	Intermediate round Group 7 winners	2020
TBD	Intermediate round Group 8 winners	2020

=== Final draw ===
The draw for the final tournament would originally be held in early 2021.

=== Group stage ===
The winners of each group advance to the final, while the runners-up of each group receive bronze medals.

Times are CEST (UTC+2), as listed by UEFA (local times, if different, are in parentheses).

==== Group A ====
Pos	Team	Pld	W	D	L	GF	GA	GD	Pts	Qualification
1	A1 (H)	0	0	0	0	0	0	0	0	Final
2	A2	0	0	0	0	0	0	0	0	Bronze medal
3	A3	0	0	0	0	0	0	0	0	
4	A4	0	0	0	0	0	0	0	0	

Source: UEFA
Rules for classification: Tiebreakers
(H) Hosts
June 2021

A1	Cancelled	A4

June 2021

A3	Cancelled	A2

June 2021

A1	Cancelled	A3

June 2021

A2	Cancelled	A4

June 2021

A2	Cancelled	A1

June 2021

A4	Cancelled	A3

==== Group B ====
Pos	Team	Pld	W	D	L	GF	GA	GD	Pts	Qualification
1	B1	0	0	0	0	0	0	0	0	Final
2	B2	0	0	0	0	0	0	0	0	Bronze medal
3	B3	0	0	0	0	0	0	0	0	
4	B4	0	0	0	0	0	0	0	0	

Source: UEFA
Rules for classification: Tiebreakers
June 2021

B1	Cancelled	B4

June 2021

B3	Cancelled	B2

June 2021

B1	Cancelled	B3

June 2021

B2	Cancelled	B4

June 2021

B2	Cancelled	B1

June 2021

B4	Cancelled	B3

=== Final ===
In the final, extra time and penalty shoot-out are used to decide the winner if necessary.

June 2021

Winner Group A	Cancelled	Winner Group B
