= UEFA Amateur Cup =

Amateur football competition in Europe

The UEFA Amateur Cup was a football competition for amateur teams in Europe.

== All tournaments ==
Year	Host	Final			Third Place Match		
Year	Host	Winner	Score	Runner-up	3rd Place	Score	4th Place
1967	Spain	Austria	2−1	Scotland	Spain	2−0	Turkey
1970	Italy	Spain	1−1 aet	Netherlands	Yugoslavia	3−0	Italy
1970	Italy	replay: 2−1			Yugoslavia	3−0	Italy
1974	Yugoslavia	Yugoslavia West Germany	-	-	Spain	2−2 aet	Netherlands
1974	Yugoslavia	Title shared			4−2 (Penalty shootout)		
1978	Greece	Yugoslavia	2−1 aet	Greece	West Germany	3−0	Ireland

== See also ==
- UEFA Regions' Cup
