= 1999 UEFA Regions' Cup =

UEFA Regions' Cup Italy 1999

Tournament details
- Host country: Italy
- Dates: 1 June – 30 June (preliminary); 31 October – 5 November (finals)
- Teams: 32 (preliminary) / 8 (finals)

Final positions
- Champions: (Italy) Veneto (1st title)
- Runners-up: (Spain) Madrid

The 1999 UEFA Regions' Cup was the first UEFA Regions' Cup. It was held in Italy and won by the Veneto team from the host nation, which beat Spain's Madrid 3–2, after extra time, in the final.

== Preliminary round ==
The 32 teams entered were drawn into eight groups of four, with the following countries hosting each group's matches:

Group 1 – Georgia
Group 2 – Poland
Group 3 – Ukraine
Group 4 – Italy
Group 5 – Greece
Group 6 – Portugal
Group 7 – Germany
Group 8 – Republic of Ireland

The winners of each group qualified for the final tournament.

=== Group 1 ===
Team	Pld	W	D	L	GF	GA	GD	Pts
(Georgia (country)) Tbilisi (H)	3	1	2	0	3	2	+1	5
(Azerbaijan) Baku	3	1	1	1	4	3	+1	4
(Russia) Yug	3	0	3	0	4	4	0	3
(Turkey) Marmara	3	0	2	1	2	4	−2	2

- (H) – Host

Notes:

- All games played in Tbilisi, Georgia

12 June 1999
Tbilisi	1 – 0	Baku
Yug	1 – 1	Marmara
13 June 1999
Tbilisi	2 – 2	Yug
Baku	3 – 1	Marmara
15 June 1999
Marmara	0 – 0	Tbilisi
Baku	1 – 1	Yug

=== Group 2 ===
Team	Pld	W	D	L	GF	GA	GD	Pts
Lesser Poland (H)	3	3	0	0	10	3	+7	9
(Latvia) Latgale	3	1	1	1	5	5	0	4
(Lithuania) Klaipėda	3	1	0	2	9	11	−2	3
(Finland) Tampere	3	0	1	2	2	7	−5	1

- (H) – Host

Notes:

- All games played in Kraków, Poland

26 June 1999
Lesser Poland	1 – 0	Tampere
Latgale	4 – 1	Klaipėda
27 June 1999
Lesser Poland	3 – 0	Latgale
Tampere	1 – 5	Klaipėda
29 June 1999
Klaipėda	3 – 6	Lesser Poland
Tampere	1 – 1	Latgale

=== Group 3 ===
Team	Pld	W	D	L	GF	GA	GD	Pts
(Ukraine) Kyiv Oblast (H)	3	3	0	0	9	0	+9	9
(Moldova) Ialoveni	3	1	1	1	5	5	0	4
Armenia	3	1	1	1	5	5	0	4
(Belarus) Minsk (forfeited)	3	0	0	3	0	9	−9	0

22 June 1999
Minsk	0 – 3	Ialoveni (f)
Kyiv Oblast	3 – 0	Armenia
23 June 1999
Armenia	2 – 2	Ialoveni
Kyiv Oblast	3 – 0	Minsk (f)
25 June 1999
Armenia	3 – 0	Minsk (f)
Ialoveni	0 – 3	Kyiv Oblast

Note
It was discovered that the Minsk team played with at least two players who participated in the Belarusian Premier League. The match between the Kyiv Oblast and Minsk ended in a 2-1 victory for the Belarusian side, but was reversed.

=== Group 4 ===
Team	Pld	W	D	L	GF	GA	GD	Pts
(Italy) Veneto (H)	3	3	0	0	10	3	+7	9
(Bulgaria) Sofia	3	2	0	1	5	4	+1	6
(Switzerland) Geneva	3	1	0	2	3	4	−1	3
(Slovenia) MNZ Ljubljana	3	0	0	3	4	11	−7	0

3 June 1999
Veneto	3 – 2	Sofia
Geneva	3 – 2	MNZ Ljubljana
4 June 1999
Veneto	1 – 0	Geneva
Sofia	2 – 1	MNZ Ljubljana
6 June 1999
MNZ Ljubljana	1 – 6	Veneto
Sofia	1 – 0	Geneva

=== Group 5 ===
Team	Pld	W	D	L	GF	GA	GD	Pts
Israel	3	3	0	0	14	2	+12	9
(Greece) Macedonia (H)	3	2	0	1	12	5	+7	6
(Federal Republic of Yugoslavia) Western Serbia	3	1	0	2	6	9	−3	3
(Malta) Gozo	3	0	0	3	2	18	−16	0

21 June 1999
Macedonia	1 – 2	Israel
Western Serbia	4 – 0	Gozo
22 June 1999
Israel	6 – 0	Gozo
Macedonia	3 – 1	Western Serbia
24 June 1999
Gozo	2 – 8	Macedonia
Israel	6 – 1	Western Serbia

=== Group 6 ===
Team	Pld	W	D	L	GF	GA	GD	Pts
(Spain) Madrid	3	3	0	0	7	2	+5	9
(France) Auvergne	3	1	1	1	3	2	+1	4
(Portugal) Algarve (H)	3	1	1	1	3	2	+1	4
San Marino	3	0	0	3	1	8	−7	0

27 June 1999
San Marino	1 – 3	Madrid
Algarve	0 – 0	Auvergne
28 June 1999
Auvergne	1 – 2	Madrid
Algarve	3 – 0	San Marino
30 June 1999
San Marino	0 – 2	Auvergne
Madrid	2 – 0	Algarve

=== Group 7 ===
Team	Pld	W	D	L	GF	GA	GD	Pts
(Czech Republic) Prague	3	2	1	0	3	1	+2	7
(Belgium) Regio Noord	3	2	0	1	6	2	+4	6
(Germany) Westphalia (H)	3	1	0	2	6	3	+3	3
Luxembourg	3	0	1	2	1	10	−9	1

1 June 1999
Westphalia	5 – 0	Luxembourg
Prague	1 – 0	Regio Noord
2 June 1999
Westphalia	0 – 1	Prague
Luxembourg	0 – 4	Regio Noord
4 June 1999
Regio Noord	2 – 1	Westphalia
Luxembourg	1 – 1	Prague

=== Group 8 ===
Team	Pld	W	D	L	GF	GA	GD	Pts
(Netherlands) District West	3	2	0	1	5	3	+2	6
(England) Cheshire	3	1	1	1	4	3	+1	4
Republic of Ireland (H)	3	1	1	1	3	3	0	4
West Scotland Region	3	1	0	2	2	5	−3	3

14 June 1999
Cheshire	1 – 2	District West
Republic of Ireland	2 – 0	West Scotland Region
16 June 1999
Cheshire	1 – 1	Republic of Ireland
District West	1 – 2	West Scotland Region
18 June 1999
West Scotland Region	0 – 2	Cheshire
Republic of Ireland	0 – 2	District West

== Final tournament ==
Italy was chosen to host the final tournament, with matches being played from 31 October to 5 November 1999.

=== Group stage ===
The eight preliminary group winners were drawn into two groups of four, with the two group winners advancing to the final.

==== Group A ====
Team	Pld	W	D	L	GF	GA	GD	Pts
(Spain) Madrid	3	2	1	0	6	2	+4	7
(Czech Republic) Prague	3	1	2	0	5	4	+1	5
Lesser Poland	3	0	2	1	3	5	−2	2
(Netherlands) District West	3	0	1	2	3	6	−3	1

31 October 1999
Madrid	1 – 1	Prague
District West	1 – 1	Lesser Poland
1 November 1999
Madrid	2 – 0	District West
Prague	1 – 1	Lesser Poland
3 November 1999
Lesser Poland	1 – 3	Madrid
Prague	3 – 2	District West

==== Group B ====
Team	Pld	W	D	L	GF	GA	GD	Pts
(Italy) Veneto (H)	3	2	1	0	5	2	+3	7
(Ukraine) Kyiv Oblast	3	1	1	1	6	4	+2	4
(Georgia (country)) Tbilisi	3	1	1	1	4	6	−2	4
Israel	3	0	1	2	2	5	−3	1

31 October 1999
Israel	1 – 1	Kyiv Oblast
Tbilisi	1 – 1	Veneto
1 November 1999
Israel	1 – 2	Tbilisi
Kyiv Oblast	1 – 2	Veneto
3 November 1999
Veneto	2 – 0	Israel
Kyiv Oblast	4 – 1	Tbilisi

=== Final ===
5 November 1999

Veneto	3 – 2 (aet)	Madrid
Borriero (<45); Giaretti (>45); De Toni 120'	(Report)	Moreno 9'; Sanz Pascual 71'

Stadio Comunale delle Terme, Abano Terme
Attendance: ~700
Referee: Guido Wildhaber (Switzerland)

1999 UEFA Regions' Cup
Winners

Veneto

== See also ==
UEFA Regions' Cup
