= 2009 UEFA Regions' Cup =

UEFA Regions' Cup Croatia 2009

Tournament details
- Host country: Croatia
- Dates: 15 June – 22 June
- Teams: 8

Final positions
- Champions: (Spain) Castile and León (1st title)
- Runners-up: (Romania) Oltenia

The 2009 UEFA Regions' Cup was the sixth UEFA Regions' Cup. It was held in Croatia and won by the Castile and León team from Spain, which beat Romania's Oltenia 2–1 in the final.

== Preliminary round ==
The eleven teams in the preliminary round were drawn into two groups of four and one group of three, with the following countries hosting each group's matches:

Group 1 – San Marino
Group 2 – Israel
Group 3 – Lithuania

The winners of each group advanced to the intermediary round.

=== Group 1 ===
Team	Pld	W	D	L	GF	GA	GD	Pts
San Marino (H)	2	1	1	0	2	1	+1	4
(Hungary) Dráva	2	1	0	1	2	1	+1	3
(North Macedonia) South-East	2	0	1	1	1	3	−2	1
Liechtenstein	withdrew							

25 September 2008
Dráva	2 – 0	South-East
27 September 2008
San Marino	1 – 0	Dráva
29 September 2008
South-East	1 – 1	San Marino

=== Group 2 ===
Team	Pld	W	D	L	GF	GA	GD	Pts
Malta	3	3	0	0	6	0	+6	9
(Israel) Maccabi Tzur Shalom (H)	3	2	0	1	6	2	+4	6
(Czech Republic) South Bohemia	3	1	0	2	4	8	−4	3
(Wales) Gwent	3	0	0	3	4	10	−6	0

3 September 2008
Maccabi Tzur Shalom	2 – 0	South Bohemia
Malta	2 – 0	Gwent
5 September 2008
Maccabi Tzur Shalom	0 – 1	Malta
South Bohemia	4 – 3	Gwent
7 September 2008
Gwent	1 – 4	Maccabi Tzur Shalom
South Bohemia	0 – 3	Malta

=== Group 3 ===
Team	Pld	W	D	L	GF	GA	GD	Pts
(Turkey) Marmara	3	2	1	0	4	1	+3	7
(Lithuania) FK Alytis (H)	3	1	2	0	6	4	+2	5
(Georgia (country)) Tbilisi	3	1	1	1	4	4	0	4
(Sweden) Växjö	3	0	0	3	0	5	−5	0

31 August 2008
FK Alytis	2 – 0	Växjö
Tbilisi	0 – 1	Marmara
2 September 2008
FK Alytis	3 – 3	Tbilisi
Växjö	0 – 2	Marmara
4 September 2008
Marmara	1 – 1	FK Alytis
Växjö	0 – 1	Tbilisi

== Intermediary round ==
The 29 teams which went straight through to the intermediary round were joined by San Marino, Malta and Turkey's Marmara. The 32 teams were drawn into eight groups of four, with the following countries hosting each group's matches:

Group 1 – Germany
Group 2 – Italy
Group 3 – Croatia
Group 4 – France
Group 5 – Russia
Group 6 – Romania
Group 7 – Serbia
Group 8 – Slovakia

The winners of each group qualified for the final tournament.

=== Group 1 ===
Team	Pld	W	D	L	GF	GA	GD	Pts
(Belgium) Kempen	3	2	0	1	4	2	+2	6
(Germany) Lower Rhine (H)	3	1	1	1	5	4	+1	4
(Northern Ireland) Eastern Region	3	1	1	1	3	3	0	4
Malta	3	1	0	2	4	7	−3	3

17 March 2009
Eastern Region	2 – 1	Malta
Lower Rhine	0 – 2	Kempen
19 March 2009
Malta	1 – 0	Kempen
Lower Rhine	0 – 0	Eastern Region
21 March 2009
Lower Rhine	5 – 2	Malta
Kempen	2 – 1	Eastern Region

=== Group 2 ===
Team	Pld	W	D	L	GF	GA	GD	Pts
(Republic of Ireland) Region I	3	1	2	0	7	3	+4	5
(England) Southern Amateur League	3	1	2	0	3	0	+3	5
(Italy) Piedmont–Aosta Valley (H)	3	1	2	0	5	3	+2	5
East of Scotland	3	0	0	3	2	11	−9	0

27 October 2008
Southern Amateur League	0 – 0	Region I
Piedmont–Aosta Valley	3 – 1	East of Scotland
29 October 2008
East of Scotland	0 – 3	Southern Amateur League
Region I	2 – 2	Piedmont–Aosta Valley
31 October 2008
Piedmont–Aosta Valley	0 – 0	Southern Amateur League
East of Scotland	1 – 5	Region I

=== Group 3 ===
Team	Pld	W	D	L	GF	GA	GD	Pts
(Croatia) Zagreb (H)	3	3	0	0	6	2	+4	9
(Netherlands) District West	3	1	1	1	4	3	+1	4
(Switzerland) Ticino	3	1	1	1	2	2	0	4
(Slovenia) MNZ Lendava	3	0	0	3	1	6	−5	0

25 September 2008
Zagreb	2 – 0	MNZ Lendava
District West	0 – 0	Ticino
27 September 2008
Zagreb	2 – 1	District West
MNZ Lendava	0 – 1	Ticino
29 September 2008
Ticino	1 – 2	Zagreb
MNZ Lendava	1 – 3	District West

=== Group 4 ===
Team	Pld	W	D	L	GF	GA	GD	Pts
(Spain) Castile and León	3	3	0	0	8	0	+8	9
(Portugal) Braga	3	1	1	1	7	4	+3	4
(France) Atlantique (H)	3	0	2	1	3	6	−3	2
San Marino	3	0	1	2	2	10	−8	1

4 April 2009
Castile and León	1 – 0	Braga
Atlantique	1 – 1	San Marino
6 April 2009
San Marino	1 – 5	Braga
Atlantique	0 – 3	Castile and León
8 April 2009
Braga	2 – 2	Atlantique
San Marino	0 – 4	Castile and León

=== Group 5 ===
Team	Pld	W	D	L	GF	GA	GD	Pts
(Russia) Privolzhie (H)	3	3	0	0	13	3	+10	9
(Turkey) Marmara	3	1	1	1	5	6	−1	4
(Belarus) Brest	3	1	0	2	3	8	−5	3
(Greece) Larissa	3	0	1	2	1	5	−4	1

1 October 2008
Marmara	1 – 1	Larissa
Privolzhie	6 – 1	Brest
3 October 2008
Brest	2 – 0	Larissa
Privolzhie	5 – 2	Marmara
5 October 2008
Larissa	0 – 2	Privolzhie
Brest	0 – 2	Marmara

=== Group 6 ===
Team	Pld	W	D	L	GF	GA	GD	Pts
(Romania) Oltenia (H)	3	2	1	0	6	1	+5	7
(Ukraine) Bastion Illichivsk	3	1	1	1	7	4	+3	4
(Moldova) Ialoveni	3	1	0	2	3	10	−7	3
(Bulgaria) South-East Region	3	0	2	1	2	3	−1	2

22 September 2008
Oltenia	0 – 0	South-East Region
Ialoveni	1 – 5	Bastion Illichivsk
24 September 2008
Oltenia	4 – 0	Ialoveni
South-East Region	1 – 1	Bastion Illichivsk
26 September 2008
Bastion Illichivsk	1 – 2	Oltenia
South-East Region	1 – 2	Ialoveni

=== Group 7 ===
Team	Pld	W	D	L	GF	GA	GD	Pts
(Bosnia and Herzegovina) Gradiška	3	2	1	0	3	0	+3	7
Eastern Serbia (H)	3	1	2	0	4	1	+3	5
Greater Poland	3	1	1	1	3	1	+2	4
(Finland) Uusimaa	3	0	0	3	1	9	−8	0

15 October 2008
Eastern Serbia	0 – 0	Gradiška
Greater Poland	3 – 0	Uusimaa
17 October 2008
Eastern Serbia	0 – 0	Greater Poland
Gradiška	2 – 0	Uusimaa
19 October 2008
Uusimaa	1 – 4	Eastern Serbia
Gradiška	1 – 0	Greater Poland

=== Group 8 ===
Team	Pld	W	D	L	GF	GA	GD	Pts
(Slovakia) Bratislava (H)	3	3	0	0	10	2	+8	9
(Azerbaijan) Avey Ağstafa	3	1	1	1	5	5	0	4
(Latvia) Kurzeme	3	1	1	1	2	5	−3	4
(Estonia) Ararat Tallinn	3	0	0	3	0	5	−5	0

11 September 2008
Bratislava	4 – 2	Avey Ağstafa
Ararat Tallinn	0 – 1	Kurzeme
13 September 2008
Bratislava	2 – 0	Ararat Tallinn
Avey Ağstafa	1 – 1	Kurzeme
15 September 2008
Kurzeme	0 – 4	Bratislava
Avey Ağstafa	2 – 0	Ararat Tallinn

== Final tournament ==
Croatia was chosen to host the final tournament, with matches being played 15 June to 22 June 2009.

=== Group stage ===
The eight intermediary group winners were drawn into two groups of four, with the two group winners advancing to the final.

==== Group A ====
Team	Pld	W	D	L	GF	GA	GD	Pts
(Romania) Oltenia	3	2	1	0	5	1	+4	7
(Russia) Privolzhie	3	2	0	1	7	2	+5	6
(Croatia) Zagreb (H)	3	1	1	1	3	3	0	4
(Slovakia) Bratislava	3	0	0	3	0	9	−9	0

15 June 2009
Zagreb	2 – 0	Bratislava
Privolzhie	0 – 2	Oltenia
17 June 2009
Zagreb	0 – 2	Privolzhie
Bratislava	0 – 2	Oltenia
20 June 2009
Oltenia	1 – 1	Zagreb
Bratislava	0 – 5	Privolzhie

==== Group B ====
Team	Pld	W	D	L	GF	GA	GD	Pts
(Spain) Castile and León	3	3	0	0	7	1	+6	9
(Belgium) Kempen	3	2	0	1	4	5	−1	6
(Republic of Ireland) Region I	3	1	0	2	4	4	0	3
(Bosnia and Herzegovina) Gradiška	3	0	0	3	0	5	−5	0

15 June 2009
Region I	0 – 2	Castile and León
Gradiška	0 – 1	Kempen
17 June 2009
Gradiška	0 – 3	Region I
Kempen	1 – 4	Castile and León
20 June 2009
Castile and León	1 – 0	Gradiška
Kempen	2 – 1	Region I

=== Final ===
22 June 2009

Oltenia (Romania)	1 – 2	(Spain) Castile and León
Sîrbu 25'	(Report)	Ramírez 20'; Robles 81'

Stadion NK Inter Zaprešić, Zaprešić
Attendance: 200
Referee: Radek Příhoda (Czech Republic)

2009 UEFA Regions' Cup
Winners

Castile and León

== See also ==
- UEFA Regions' Cup
