= UEFA Regions' Cup =

- Organiser(s): UEFA
- Founded: 1996; 30 years ago
- Region: Europe
- Teams: Up to 53 (qualifiers); 8 (finals)
- Current champions: (Spain) Aragon (1st title)
- Website: uefa.com/regionscup
- 2027 UEFA Regions' Cup

The UEFA Regions' Cup is a football competition for amateur teams in Europe, run by UEFA. It was held for the first time in 1999 and has been played biennially since. The 2025 champions are the Aragon team from Spain.

The competition was created in 1996 as there was no European level competition for amateur teams. The UEFA Amateur Cup, a previous attempt to organise a continental competition for amateurs, had run from 1966 to 1978, but ceased due to lack of interest from both the public and amateur teams themselves. In contrast to today's Regions' Cup, in which amateur regions are represented, the previous competition was for representative amateur national teams.

Each UEFA member nation may enter one representative amateur team into the competition, with regions having to win a domestic amateur competition (such as the FA Inter-League Cup) in order to qualify.

The first two finals were won by teams from the host nation. Thus far, Spain has been the most successful nation in the competition, with its representatives winning four of the thirteen editions.

== Format ==
All of the 55 UEFA-affiliated associations are eligible to submit a team to compete in the Regions' Cup, provided they hold a domestic qualifying competition to decide which team will represent that nation. Smaller member nations, however, are permitted to enter a representative national side. 8 associations have never entered a team as of the 2025 Regions' Cup: Austria, Denmark, Norway, Kosovo, Cyprus, Iceland, Faroe Islands, and Gibraltar.

Teams were entered by 32 nations for the inaugural tournament in 1999 and competed in one qualifying round. As interest in the tournament grew over the years, the qualifying stage was enlarged and an extra group round added in 2005, scrapping the playoffs added in 2001.

The preliminary round consists of a small number of teams split into groups, with the best from each group being included in the draw for the intermediary round. In the intermediary round, the teams are placed into eight groups of four teams. The teams in each group play each other once and the team finishing top of the group qualifies for the Regions' Cup finals. The eight group winners are placed into two groups of four for the final tournament and the winners of these two final groups, after each team has played one another once, play in the final, with the winners being crowned champions. Third place is shared between the two teams which finish second in their respective groups.

One aspect of the Regions' Cup that is different from most other international club tournaments is the hosting of games. As teams play each other once in the preliminary and intermediary rounds, in contrast to the more common two-legged fixtures, each group has all its matches held in one particular region. For example, in the 2009 tournament, all the preliminary Group 1 matches were played in San Marino. Another unusual feature of the Regions' Cup is the choice of host for the final tournament. In most football tournaments, the host nation or city is decided by the governing body before qualification begins. In the Regions' Cup, however, the host is chosen only after most of the eight finalist teams have qualified, with one of the qualified regions selected as host.

== Results ==
Edition	Year	Hosts	Winners	Score	Runners-up	Bronze medalists	
1	1999 details	Italy	Veneto	3–2 (a.e.t.)	Madrid	Prague	Kyiv Oblast
2	2001 details	Czech Republic	Central Moravia	2–2; 4–2 (p)	Braga	Madrid	Plovdiv
3	2003 details	Germany	Piedmont-Aosta Valley	2–1	Maine	Szabolcs Gabona	Württemberg
4	2005 details	Poland	Basque Country	1–0	South-West Sofia	Kzeso	Central Slovakia
5	2007 details	Bulgaria	Lower Silesia	2–1 (a.e.t.)	South-East Region	Aveiro	Tuzla Canton
6	2009 details	Croatia	Castile and León	2–1	Oltenia	Privolzhie	Kempen
7	2011 details	Portugal	Braga	2–1	Leinster & Munster	Zlín	Belgrade
8	2013 details	Italy	Veneto	0–0; 5–4 (p)	Catalonia	Eastern Region	Isloch
9	2015 details	Republic of Ireland	Eastern Region	1–0	Zagreb	Ankara	Württemberg
10	2017 details	Turkey	Zagreb	1–0	Munster/Connacht	Istanbul	Rostov Oblast
11	2019 details	Germany	Lower Silesia	3–2	Bavaria	Istanbul	Castile and León
–	2021 details	N/A	Cancelled due to COVID-19 pandemic in Europe			Cancelled due to COVID-19 pandemic in Europe	
12	2023 details	Spain	Galicia	3–1	Belgrade	Bavaria	Zlín
13	2025 details	San Marino	Aragon	1–0 (a.e.t.)	Lower Silesia	Rijeka	Vojvodina
14	2027 details						

== Finals ==
5 November 1999

Veneto (Italy)	3–2 (a.e.t.)	(Spain) Madrid
Borriero (<45); Giaretti (>45); De Toni 120'	Report	Moreno 9'; Sanz Pascual 71'

Stadio Comunale delle Terme, Abano Terme
Attendance: 700
Referee: Guido Wildhaber (Switzerland)

24 June 2001

Braga (Portugal)	2–2 (a.e.t.)	(Czech Republic) Central Moravia
Ferreira 55'; Freitas 84'	Report	David 12'; Svach 90+4' (pen.)
Penalties
	2–4

Letná Stadion, Zlín
Attendance: 2,820
Referee: Tony Chapron (France)

28 June 2003

Maine (France)	1–2	(Italy) Piedmont–Aosta Valley
Kharraz 83'	Report	Borgna 24', 29'

Albstadion, Heidenheim
Attendance: 800
Referee: Kris Hermans (Belgium)

9 July 2005

South-West Sofia (Bulgaria)	0–1	(Spain) Basque Country
	Report	Arroyo 33'

KS Proszowianka Stadium, Proszowice
Attendance: 1,300
Referee: Novo Panić (Bosnia and Herzegovina)

26 June 2007

South-East Region (Bulgaria)	1–2 (a.e.t.)	(Poland) Lower Silesia
Stoyanov 66'	Report	Sudoł 78'; Jaskułowski 114'

Hadzhi Dimitar Stadium, Sliven
Attendance: 3,500
Referee: Paolo Tagliavento (Italy)

22 June 2009

Oltenia (Romania)	1–2	(Spain) Castile and León
Sîrbu 25'	Report	Ramírez 20'; Robles 81'

Stadion NK Inter Zaprešić, Zaprešić
Attendance: 200
Referee: Radek Příhoda (Czech Republic)

28 June 2011

Braga (Portugal)	2–1	(Republic of Ireland) Leinster & Munster
Nobre 62'; Fortunato 84'	Report	O'Sullivan 68'

Cidade de Barcelos, Barcelos
Attendance: 1,036
Referee: Ken Henry Johnson (Norway)

29 June 2013

Veneto (Italy)	0–0	(Spain) Catalonia
	Report
Penalties
	5–4

Comunale Delle Terme, Abano Terme
Attendance: 800
Referee: Artur Soares Dias (Portugal)

4 July 2015

Eastern Region (Republic of Ireland)	1–0	(Croatia) Zagreb
David Lacey 10'	Report

Tallaght Stadium, Dublin
Attendance: 1,172
Referee: Nikolaj Hänni (Switzerland)

9 July 2017

Zagreb (Croatia)	1–0	(Republic of Ireland) Munster/Connacht
Adžić 26'	Report

TFF Riva Stadium, Istanbul
Attendance: 175
Referee: Artyom Kuchin (Kazakhstan)

26 June 2019

Bavaria (Germany)	2–3	(Poland) Lower Silesia
Türk 35' (pen.); Ekin 90' (pen.)	Report	Jaros 41'; Traczyk 47' (pen.); Bohdanowicz 80' (pen.)

Wacker-Arena, Burghausen
Attendance: 1,224
Referee: Sebastian Colţescu (Romania)

17 June 2023
19:00

Galicia (Spain)	3–1	(Serbia) Belgrade
Rial 9'; Rey 41' (pen.); Martinez 74'	Report	Kolarević 57'

Campo Municipal de A Lomba, Vilagarcía de Arousa
Attendance: 4,085
Referee: Kristoffer Karlsson (Sweden)

1 July 2025
20:45

Aragon (Spain)	1–0 (a.e.t.)	(Poland) Lower Silesia
Torcal 120+1'	Report

Acquaviva Stadium, Acquaviva
Attendance: 248
Referee: Robertas Valikonis (Lithuania)

== Titles by country ==
Country	Titles	Runners-up	Winning teams	Second-placed teams
Spain	4	2	Basque Country (2005)	Madrid (1999)
Spain	4	2	Castile and León (2009)	Madrid (1999)
Spain	4	2	Galicia (2023*)	Catalonia (2013)
Spain	4	2	Aragon (2025)	Catalonia (2013)
Italy	3	0	Veneto (1999*, 2013*)	None
Italy	3	0	Piedmont–Aosta Valley (2003)	None
Poland	2	1	Lower Silesia (2007, 2019)	Lower Silesia (2025)
Ireland	1	2	Eastern Region (2015*)	Leinster & Munster (2011)
Ireland	1	2	Eastern Region (2015*)	Munster/Connacht (2017)
Portugal	1	1	Braga (2011*)	Braga (2001)
Croatia	1	1	Zagreb (2017)	Zagreb (2015)
Czech Republic	1	0	Central Moravia (2001*)	None
Bulgaria	0	2	None	South-West Sofia (2005)
Bulgaria	0	2	None	South-East Region (2007*)
France	0	1	None	Maine (2003)
Romania	0	1	None	Oltenia (2009)
Germany	0	1	None	Bavaria (2019*)
Serbia	0	1	None	Belgrade (2023)

* = Hosts

== See also ==
- List of UEFA Regions' Cup qualifying competitions
- Inter-Cities Fairs Cup
- UEFA Amateur Cup
- FENIX Trophy
