= 2025 UEFA Regions' Cup =

Tournament details
- Host country: Final tournament: San Marino
- Dates: Qualifying rounds: 20 May – 19 November 2024; Final tournament: 23 June – 1 July 2025
- Teams: Final tournament: 8 Total: 36 (from 36 associations)

Final positions
- Champions: (Spain) Aragon (1st title)
- Runners-up: (Poland) Lower Silesia

Tournament statistics
- Matches played: 50
- Goals scored: 165 (3.3 per match)
- Top scorer(s): (Czech Republic) Jakub Slavík (6 goals)

The 2025 UEFA Regions' Cup was the 13th edition of the UEFA Regions' Cup, a football competition for amateur teams in Europe organized by UEFA.

Galicia from Spain were the title holders, defeating Belgrade in the final.

== Teams ==
A total of 35 teams entered the tournament. Any sides from Russia were barred from participation.

Associations were ranked according to their UEFA coefficients, computed based on results of the last three seasons (2017, 2019, 2023), to decide on the round their teams entered and their seeding pots in the preliminary and intermediate round draws. The top 35 associations entered the intermediate round, while the bottom 6 associations (ranked 31–36) entered the preliminary round.

The draw for the preliminary and intermediate rounds was held on 7 December 2023, at the UEFA headquarters in Nyon, Switzerland. The mechanism of the draws for each round was as follows:

- In the preliminary round, the five teams were drawn into two groups of two and three without any seeding.
- In the intermediate round, the 31 teams were drawn into eight groups of four. Each group contained one team from Pot A, one team from Pot B, one team from Pot C, and either one team from Pot D or one team which advanced from the preliminary round (whose identity was not known at the time of the draw).

Qualified teams for 2025 UEFA Regions' Cup
Entry round	Rank	Association	Team	Qualifying competition	Coeff	Pot
Intermediate round	1	Spain	Aragon	2023–24 Spanish stage of the UEFA Regions' Cup	14.333	A
Intermediate round	2	Poland	(Lower Silesian Voivodeship) Lower Silesia		13.000	A
Intermediate round	3	Czech Republic	(Hradec Králové Region) Hradec Králové		12.333	A
Intermediate round	4	Portugal	Lisbon		12.333	A
Intermediate round	5	Croatia	Rijeka		12.333	A
Intermediate round	6	Republic of Ireland	Munster		11.667	A
Intermediate round	7	Turkey	Istanbul	2024 Turkish stage of the UEFA Regions' Cup	11.333	A
Intermediate round	8	Serbia	Vojvodina		10.333	A
Intermediate round	9	Ukraine	Withdrew		9.000	
Intermediate round	10	Slovakia	Western Slovakia	Regional amateur team	8.667	B
Intermediate round	11	Hungary	Hungary	National amateur team	8.667	B
Intermediate round	12	Italy	Liguria		8.333	B
Intermediate round	13	Switzerland	Vaud		8.000	B
Intermediate round	14	Bulgaria	South West Bulgaria	Regional amateur team	7.667	B
Intermediate round	15	Bosnia and Herzegovina	Tuzla		7.333	B
Intermediate round	16	England	Arthurian League	2023–24 FA Inter-League Cup	7.000	B
Intermediate round	17	Israel	Ironi Nesher		6.833	C
Intermediate round	18	Finland	Länsi-Vantaan Ylpeys	2024 Suomen Regions’ Cup	6.333	C
Intermediate round	19	Wales	Tim Rhanbarthol y De		6.000	C
Intermediate round	20	San Marino	San Marino	National amateur team	6.000	C
Intermediate round	21	Northern Ireland	NI Western Region	Regional amateur team	5.333	C
Intermediate round	22	Scotland	Central Scotland	Regional amateur team	5.167	C
Intermediate round	23	Belarus	(Ivatsevichy) Ivatsevichi-Duss		5.000	C
Intermediate round	24	Romania	Romanian Amateur Squad	Regional amateur team	5.000	C
Intermediate round	25	Slovenia	Ljubljana		5.000	D
Intermediate round	26	Moldova	Anenii Noi		4.667	D
Intermediate round	27	North Macedonia	North Macedonia	National amateur team	4.500	D
Intermediate round	28	Malta	Gozo		4.333	D
Intermediate round	29	Latvia	Latvia	National amateur team	3.667	D
Intermediate round	30	Kazakhstan	Akbet		3.000	D
Preliminary round	31	Sweden	Gothenburg		2.333	1
Preliminary round	32	Georgia	Bridge		2.133	1
Preliminary round	33	Azerbaijan	Shimal		2.000	1
Preliminary round	34	Estonia	Saue		0.000	1
Preliminary round	35	Albania	Albania	National amateur team	–	1
Preliminary round	36	Armenia	Vayk		–	1

Associations which did not enter
Andorra	Austria	Belgium	Cyprus	Denmark
Faroe Islands	France	Germany	Gibraltar	Greece
Iceland	Kosovo	Liechtenstein	Lithuania	Luxembourg
Montenegro	Netherlands	Norway		

Banned associations
Russia

== Preliminary round ==
The group winners advance to the intermediate round to join the 30 teams which receive byes to the intermediate round.

Times are CEST (UTC+2), as listed by UEFA (local times, if different, are in parentheses).

=== Group A ===
Pos	Team	Pld	W	D	L	GF	GA	GD	Pts	Qualification
1	Albania (H)	2	2	0	0	5	0	+5	6	Advance to Intermediate round
2	(Armenia) Vayk	2	1	0	1	1	4	−3	3	
3	(Estonia) Saue	2	0	0	2	0	2	−2	0	

Source: UEFA
(H) Hosts
20 May 2024
17:45

Vayk (Armenia)	0–4	Albania
	Report	Alushi 12' (pen.), 46'; Paci 32'; Shehu 42'

Elbasan Arena, Elbasan
Attendance: 200
Referee: Marcel Birsan (Romania)

23 May 2024
17:45

Saue (Estonia)	0–1	(Armenia) Vayk
	Report	Margaryan 90+1'

Elbasan Arena, Elbasan
Referee: Jason Barcelo (Gibraltar)

26 May 2024
16:00

Albania	1–0	(Estonia) Saue
Kote 27'	Report

Elbasan Arena, Elbasan
Attendance: 50
Referee: Vilhjálmur Þórarinsson (Iceland)

=== Group B ===
Pos	Team	Pld	W	D	L	GF	GA	GD	Pts	Qualification
1	(Georgia (country)) Bridge (H)	2	2	0	0	10	1	+9	6	Advance to Intermediate round
2	(Sweden) Gothenburg	2	0	1	1	3	7	−4	1	
3	(Azerbaijan) Shimal	2	0	1	1	2	7	−5	1	

Source: UEFA
(H) Hosts
28 June 2024
17:00

Bridge (Georgia (country))	5–0	(Azerbaijan) Shimal
Bitsadze 14'; Botkoveli 30'; Jobinashvili 41'; Khidesheli 70', 72'	Report

GFF Kutaisi Football Academy, Kutaisi
Attendance: 150
Referee: Miloš Bošković (Montenegro)

1 July 2024
17:00

Shimal (Azerbaijan)	2–2	(Sweden) Gothenburg
Kafarov 44'; Sadiyev 58'	Report	Ursholm 12'; Árnason 60'

GFF Kutaisi Football Academy, Kutaisi
Attendance: 50
Referee: Dumitri Muntean (Moldova)

4 July 2024
17:00

Gothenburg (Sweden)	1–5	(Georgia (country)) Bridge
Árnason 90+2'	Report	Botkoveli 10', 41', 58'; Zibzibadze 55'; Jolokhava 86'

GFF Kutaisi Football Academy, Kutaisi
Attendance: 120
Referee: Robertas Valikonis (Lithuania)

== Intermediate round ==
The eight group winners advance to the final tournament. The winners of each group qualify for the finals, which in principle will be held in the last two weeks of June 2023, with the hosts to be decided when the qualifiers are known.

Times are CEST (UTC+2), as listed by UEFA (local times, if different, are in parentheses).

=== Group 1 ===
Pos	Team	Pld	W	D	L	GF	GA	GD	Pts	Qualification
1	(Poland) Lower Silesia	1	1	0	0	3	1	+2	3	Final tournament
2	(Kazakhstan) Akbet (H)	1	0	0	1	1	3	−2	0	
3	(Israel) Ironi Nesher	0	0	0	0	0	0	0	0	Withdrew due to Gaza war

Source: UEFA
Rules for classification: Tiebreakers
(H) Hosts
25 August 2024
14:00

Akbet (Kazakhstan)	1–3	(Poland) Lower Silesia
Marat 36'	Report	Marcjan 18'; Kurianowicz 39' (pen.); Poswistajlo 64'

Sports and training base of the Kazakhstan Football Federation, Talgar
Attendance: 46
Referee: Vitālijs Spasjoņņikovs (Latvia)

=== Group 2 ===
Pos	Team	Pld	W	D	L	GF	GA	GD	Pts	Qualification
1	(Finland) Länsi-Vantaan Ylpeys (H)	3	2	1	0	8	2	+6	7	Final tournament
2	(England) Arthurian League	3	1	2	0	6	5	+1	5	
3	(Portugal) Lisbon	3	1	1	1	6	5	+1	4	
4	Latvia	3	0	0	3	2	10	−8	0	

Source: UEFA
Rules for classification: Tiebreakers
(H) Hosts
31 July 2024
12:00

Arthurian League (England)	3–3	(Portugal) Lisbon
Semedo 3' (o.g.); Raine 32'; Brooking 86'	Report	Gavino 35'; Bastos 48'; Botas 56'

Myyrmäen jalkapallostadion, Vantaa
Attendance: 57
Referee: Juri Frischer (Estonia)
31 July 2024
17:30

Länsi-Vantaan Ylpeys (Finland)	5–1	Latvia
Rahkola 19'; Partanen 23'; Nyholm 25'; Nurmi 39'; Jmaali 80'	Report	Lērme 48'

Myyrmäen jalkapallostadion, Vantaa
Attendance: 354
Referee: Zaven Hovhannisyan (Armenia)

3 August 2024
11:00

Lisbon (Portugal)	3–0	Latvia
Botas 13'; Kiala 22'; Job 86'	Report

Myyrmäen jalkapallostadion, Vantaa
Attendance: 38
Referee: Zaven Hovhannisyan (Armenia)
3 August 2024
16:00

Länsi-Vantaan Ylpeys (Finland)	1–1	(England) Arthurian League
Nyholm 44'	Report	Riley 90+3'

Myyrmäen jalkapallostadion, Vantaa
Attendance: 396
Referee: Volen Chinkov (Bulgaria)

6 August 2024
11:00

Latvia	1–2	(England) Arthurian League
Geidāns 43'	Report	Bonnar 15'; Thomas 59'

Myyrmäen jalkapallostadion, Vantaa
Attendance: 48
Referee: Volen Chinkov (Bulgaria)
6 August 2024
16:30

Lisbon (Portugal)	0–2	(Finland) Länsi-Vantaan Ylpeys
	Report	Nurmi 54'; Gädda 81'

Myyrmäen jalkapallostadion, Vantaa
Attendance: 754
Referee: Juri Frischer (Estonia)

=== Group 3 ===
Pos	Team	Pld	W	D	L	GF	GA	GD	Pts	Qualification
1	(Serbia) Vojvodina (H)	3	3	0	0	7	2	+5	9	Final tournament
2	Western Slovakia	3	2	0	1	5	4	+1	6	
3	(Wales) Tim Rhanbarthol y De	3	1	0	2	5	7	−2	3	
4	North Macedonia	3	0	0	3	2	6	−4	0	

Source: UEFA
Rules for classification: Tiebreakers
(H) Hosts
13 September 2024
12:00

Tim Rhanbarthol y De (Wales)	1–3	Western Slovakia
Bonthron 28' (pen.)	Report	Mego 77'; Gašpar 86'; Domasta 89' (pen.)

Serbian FA Sports Center, Stara Pazova
Attendance: 7
Referee: Marcel Birsan (Romania)
13 September 2024
16:00

Vojvodina (Serbia)	2–0	North Macedonia
Barić 80'; Bačvanski 90+2'	Report

Serbian FA Sports Center, Stara Pazova
Attendance: 50
Referee: Dragomir Draganov (Bulgaria)

16 September 2024
12:00

Western Slovakia	2–1	North Macedonia
Mego 70'; Stovička 78'	Report	Spasov 51'

Serbian FA Sports Center, Stara Pazova
Attendance: 2
Referee: Marcel Birsan (Romania)
16 September 2024
16:00

Vojvodina (Serbia)	3–2	(Wales) Tim Rhanbarthol y De
Allen 65' (o.g.); Jelić 85'; Mitrović 90+6'	Report	Eason 8'; Bonthron 62'

Serbian FA Sports Center, Stara Pazova
Attendance: 45
Referee: Kadir Sağlam (Türkiye)

19 September 2024
16:00

Western Slovakia	0–2	(Serbia) Vojvodina
	Report	Topić 36'; Mitrović 55'

Serbian FA Sports Center, Stara Pazova
Attendance: 150
Referee: Kadir Sağlam (Türkiye)
19 September 2024
16:00

North Macedonia	1–2	(Wales) Tim Rhanbarthol y De
Spasov 53'	Report	Bonthron 32'; Eason 85'

Serbian FA Sports Center, Stara Pazova
Attendance: 10
Referee: Dragomir Draganov (Bulgaria)

=== Group 4 ===
Pos	Team	Pld	W	D	L	GF	GA	GD	Pts	Qualification
1	(Switzerland) Vaud (H)	3	2	1	0	5	1	+4	7	Final tournament
2	(Republic of Ireland) Munster	3	1	2	0	3	2	+1	5	
3	(Northern Ireland) NI Western Region	3	1	0	2	2	3	−1	3	
4	(Georgia (country)) Bridge	3	0	1	2	0	4	−4	1	

Source: UEFA
Rules for classification: Tiebreakers
(H) Hosts
21 October 2024
11:30

Munster (Republic of Ireland)	0–0	(Georgia (country)) Bridge
	Report

Colovray Sports Centre, Nyon
Attendance: 24
Referee: Eldorjan Hamiti (Albania)
21 October 2024
14:30

NI Western Region (Northern Ireland)	0–1	(Switzerland) Vaud
	Report	Goncalves 48'

Colovray Sports Centre, Nyon
Attendance: 67
Referee: Miloš Gigovic (Bosnia and Herzegovina)

24 October 2024
11:30

Munster (Republic of Ireland)	2–1	(Northern Ireland) NI Western Region
O'Dwyer 28'; Delurey 75'	Report	Sherry 57'

Colovray Sports Centre, Nyon
Attendance: 68
Referee: Joni Hyytiä (Finland)
24 October 2024
14:30

Vaud (Switzerland)	3–0	(Georgia (country)) Bridge
Mamadou 26'; Mast 69', 82'	Report

Colovray Sports Centre, Nyon
Attendance: 98
Referee: Miloš Gigovic (Bosnia and Herzegovina)

27 October 2024
16:00

Vaud (Switzerland)	1–1	(Republic of Ireland) Munster
Rullo 12'	Report	Murphy 84'

Colovray Sports Centre, Nyon
Attendance: 264
Referee: Joni Hyytiä (Finland)
27 October 2024
16:00

Bridge (Georgia (country))	0–1	(Northern Ireland) NI Western Region
	Report	Byrne 33'

Colovray Sports Centre, Nyon
Attendance: 15
Referee: Eldorjan Hamiti (Albania)

=== Group 5 ===
Pos	Team	Pld	W	D	L	GF	GA	GD	Pts	Qualification
1	(Czech Republic) Hradec Králové	3	3	0	0	10	1	+9	9	Final tournament
2	(Bosnia and Herzegovina) Tuzla (H)	3	2	0	1	5	3	+2	6	
3	Albania	3	0	1	2	0	4	−4	1	
4	Central Scotland	3	0	1	2	1	8	−7	1	

Source: UEFA
Rules for classification: Tiebreakers
(H) Hosts
14 August 2024
17:00

Hradec Králové (Czech Republic)	3–0	Albania
Slavík 3', 41', 51'	Report

Gradski stadion Luke, Gračanica
Attendance: 55
Referee: Jason Barcelo (Gibraltar)
14 August 2024
17:00

Central Scotland	1–3	(Bosnia and Herzegovina) Tuzla
O'Neill 82'	Report	Musić 38'; Mustafic 51' (pen.); Kukic 70'

Stadion FK Budućnost, Banovići
Attendance: 250
Referee: Vitaliy Romanov (Ukraine)

17 August 2024
17:00

Hradec Králové (Czech Republic)	5–0	Central Scotland
Strasser 19'; Franc 54'; Čechovič 76'; Štěpánek 81'; Slavík 84'	Report

Gradski stadion Luke, Gračanica
Attendance: 25
Referee: Sigurd Kringstad (Norway)
17 August 2024
17:00

Tuzla (Bosnia and Herzegovina)	1–0	Albania
Mustafic 55'	Report

Stadion FK Budućnost, Banovići
Attendance: 120
Referee: Vitaliy Romanov (Ukraine)

20 August 2024
17:00

Tuzla (Bosnia and Herzegovina)	1–2	(Czech Republic) Hradec Králové
Kadić 62'	Report	Slavík 10', 75'

Gradski stadion Luke, Gračanica
Attendance: 300
Referee: Sigurd Kringstad (Norway)
20 August 2024
17:00

Albania	0–0	Central Scotland
	Report

Stadion FK Budućnost, Banovići
Attendance: 11
Referee: Jason Barcelo (Gibraltar)

=== Group 6 ===
Pos	Team	Pld	W	D	L	GF	GA	GD	Pts	Qualification
1	San Marino (H)	3	3	0	0	8	2	+6	9	Final tournament
2	(Turkey) Istanbul	3	1	1	1	3	4	−1	4	
3	Hungary	3	0	2	1	6	7	−1	2	
4	(Slovenia) Ljubljana	3	0	1	2	2	6	−4	1	

Source: UEFA
Rules for classification: Tiebreakers
(H) Hosts
13 November 2024
11:00

Istanbul (Turkey)	1–0	(Slovenia) Ljubljana
Firat 58'	Report

Stadio di Montecchio, San Marino
Attendance: 12
Referee: Tim Marshall (Northern Ireland)
13 November 2024
14:30

San Marino	3–2	Hungary
Pancotti 31'; Lisi 59'; Benincasa 61'	Report	Lehota 20'; Laczkó 86'

Stadio di Montecchio, San Marino
Attendance: 56
Referee: Vilhjálmur Þórarinsson (Iceland)

16 November 2024
11:00

Hungary	2–2	(Slovenia) Ljubljana
Laczkó 1'; Szentes 17'	Report	Brus 73'; Veiss 85' (pen.)

Stadio di Montecchio, San Marino
Attendance: 31
Referee: Vilhjálmur Þórarinsson (Iceland)
16 November 2024
14:30

Istanbul (Turkey)	0–2	San Marino
	Report	Benincasa 14' (pen.); Merli 59'

Stadio di Montecchio, San Marino
Attendance: 94
Referee: Visar Kastrati (Kosovo)

19 November 2024
11:00

Hungary	2–2	(Turkey) Istanbul
Ulrich 13', 39'	Report	Firat 72' (pen.); Çay 90'

Stadio di Montecchio, San Marino
Attendance: 31
Referee: Visar Kastrati (Kosovo)
19 November 2024
14:30

Ljubljana (Slovenia)	0–3	San Marino
	Report	Gori 24'; Babboni 33'; Merli 81'

Stadio di Montecchio, San Marino
Attendance: 41
Referee: Tim Marshall (Northern Ireland)

=== Group 7 ===
Pos	Team	Pld	W	D	L	GF	GA	GD	Pts	Qualification
1	(Spain) Aragon	3	3	0	0	15	0	+15	9	Final tournament
2	South West Bulgaria (H)	3	2	0	1	10	3	+7	6	
3	(Belarus) Ivatsevichi-Duss	3	1	0	2	4	11	−7	3	
4	(Moldova) Anenii Noi	3	0	0	3	0	15	−15	0	

Source: UEFA
Rules for classification: Tiebreakers
(H) Hosts
29 October 2024
10:00

Aragon (Spain)	8–0	(Moldova) Anenii Noi
Samitier 2', 8', 14'; Romeo 40'; Baquero 49'; García 62' (pen.); Millán 82'; Guiu 90'	Report

Albena 1 Stadium, Albena
Attendance: 28
Referee: Philip Farrugia (Malta)
29 October 2024
14:00

Ivatsevichi-Duss (Belarus)	1–6	South West Bulgaria
Karaliou 13'	Report	Petrov 21', 66'; Milovanovic 25'; Roshkov 36'; Bozev 44'; Rodopski 74'

Albena 1 Stadium, Albena
Attendance: 78
Referee: Martin Dohal (Slovakia)

1 November 2024
10:00

Aragon (Spain)	5–0	(Belarus) Ivatsevichi-Duss
Kinakh 12' (o.g.); Muñoz 37'; Samitier 49'; Torcal 88'; Sales 90'	Report

Albena 1 Stadium, Albena
Attendance: 33
Referee: Miloš Bošković (Montenegro)
1 November 2024
14:00

South West Bulgaria	4–0	(Moldova) Anenii Noi
Petrov 14', 16'; Milovanovic 51'; Ergin 89'	Report

Albena 1 Stadium, Albena
Attendance: 59
Referee: Martin Dohal (Slovakia)

4 November 2024
14:00

South West Bulgaria	0–2	(Spain) Aragon
	Report	Samitier 17'; Charlez 90+4'

Stadion Spartak, Varna
Attendance: 350
Referee: Miloš Bošković (Montenegro)
4 November 2024
14:00

Anenii Noi (Moldova)	0–3	(Belarus) Ivatsevichi-Duss
	Report	Abramchuk 39', 78'; Karanau 90'

Albena 1 Stadium, Albena
Attendance: 18
Referee: Philip Farrugia (Malta)

=== Group 8 ===
Pos	Team	Pld	W	D	L	GF	GA	GD	Pts	Qualification
1	(Croatia) Rijeka	3	3	0	0	12	3	+9	9	Final tournament
2	(Italy) Liguria (H)	3	2	0	1	8	5	+3	6	
3	(Romania) Romanian Amateur Squad	3	1	0	2	4	9	−5	3	
4	(Malta) Gozo	3	0	0	3	0	7	−7	0	

Source: UEFA
Rules for classification: Tiebreakers
(H) Hosts
17 September 2024
17:00

Rijeka (Croatia)	3–0	(Malta) Gozo
Matković 9'; Prizmić 34'; Ivetić 76'	Report

Stadio Giuseppe Sivori, Sestri Levante
Attendance: 40
Referee: Iwan Arwel Griffith (Wales)
17 September 2024
17:00

Romanian Amateur Squad (Romania)	0–5	(Italy) Liguria
	Report	Costache 4' (o.g.); Cicirello 6'; Spano 15'; Travella 30'; Costa 44'

Stadio Comunale, Chiavari
Attendance: 50
Referee: Miloš Savović (Montenegro)

20 September 2024
17:00

Rijeka (Croatia)	4–1	(Romania) Romanian Amateur Squad
Ivetić 36', 50'; Lagumdžija 41'; Bogdanić 72'	Report	Sorea 64'

Stadio Comunale, Chiavari
Attendance: 25
Referee: Gal Leibovitz (Israel)
20 September 2024
17:00

Liguria (Italy)	1–0	(Malta) Gozo
Damonte 47'	Report

Stadio Giuseppe Sivori, Sestri Levante
Attendance: 88
Referee: Miloš Savović (Montenegro)

23 September 2024
17:00

Liguria (Italy)	2–5	(Croatia) Rijeka
Damonte 41'; Travella 45+3'	Report	Antanasković 14'; Klenovšek 38', 53'; Ivetić 68'; Matković 75'

Stadio Comunale, Chiavari
Attendance: 60
Referee: Gal Leibovitz (Israel)
23 September 2024
17:00

Gozo (Malta)	0–3	(Romania) Romanian Amateur Squad
	Report	Gaiceanu 7'; Bedo 82'; Voiniciuc 90+3'

Stadio Giuseppe Sivori, Sestri Levante
Attendance: 22
Referee: Iwan Arwel Griffith (Wales)

== Final tournament ==
The hosts of the final tournament were selected by UEFA from the eight qualified teams. The eight teams were drawn into two groups of four on 6 March at San Marino Stadium, Serravalle. The two group winners will meet in the final.

=== Qualified teams ===
The following teams qualified for the final tournament.

Team	Method of qualification	Date of qualification
(Poland) Lower Silesia	Intermediate round Group 1 winners	25 August 2024
(Finland) Länsi-Vantaan Ylpeys	Intermediate round Group 2 winners	6 August 2024
(Serbia) Vojvodina	Intermediate round Group 3 winners	19 September 2024
(Switzerland) Vaud	Intermediate round Group 4 winners	27 October 2024
(Czech Republic) Hradec Králové	Intermediate round Group 5 winners	20 August 2024
San Marino	Intermediate round Group 6 winners	16 November 2024
(Spain) Aragon	Intermediate round Group 7 winners	4 November 2024
(Croatia) Rijeka	Intermediate round Group 8 winners	23 September 2024

=== Group A ===
Pos	Team	Pld	W	D	L	GF	GA	GD	Pts	Qualification
1	(Spain) Aragon	3	2	1	0	5	1	+4	7	Final
2	(Serbia) Vojvodina	3	1	1	1	3	5	−2	4 (Note: Head-to-head result: Hradec Králové 1–2 Vojvodina.)	Bronze medal
3	(Czech Republic) Hradec Králové	3	1	1	1	3	3	0	4	
4	San Marino (H)	3	0	1	2	1	3	−2	1	

Source: UEFA
Rules for classification: Tiebreakers
(H) Hosts
Notes:
23 June 2025
18:00

Aragon (Spain)	1–1	(Czech Republic) Hradec Králové
San Agustín 14' (pen.)	Report	Novotný 85'

Acquaviva Stadium, Acquaviva
Attendance: 133
Referee: Walter Altmann (Austria)
23 June 2025
21:30

San Marino	1–1	(Serbia) Vojvodina
Pancotti 53'	Report	Popov 49'

Acquaviva Stadium, Acquaviva
Attendance: 323
Referee: Eldorjan Hamiti (Albania)

25 June 2025
18:00

Hradec Králové (Czech Republic)	1–2	(Serbia) Vojvodina
Novotný 33'	Report	Jelić 65'; Vukas 90+4'

Acquaviva Stadium, Acquaviva
Attendance: 131
Referee: Robertas Valikonis (Lithuania)
25 June 2025
21:30

San Marino	0–1	(Spain) Aragon
	Report	San Agustín 29'

Acquaviva Stadium, Acquaviva
Attendance: 294
Referee: Mads Kristoffersen (Denmark)

28 June 2025
21:30

Hradec Králové (Czech Republic)	1–0	San Marino
Blažek 45'	Report

Acquaviva Stadium, Acquaviva
Attendance: 138
Referee: Dumitri Muntean (Moldova)
28 June 2025
21:30

Vojvodina (Serbia)	0–3	(Spain) Aragon
	Report	Chegu 22', 68'; Torcal 88'

Stadio di Montecchio, San Marino
Attendance: 81
Referee: Walter Altmann (Austria)

=== Group B ===
Pos	Team	Pld	W	D	L	GF	GA	GD	Pts	Qualification
1	(Poland) Lower Silesia	3	3	0	0	4	1	+3	9	Final
2	(Croatia) Rijeka	3	1	1	1	4	4	0	4	Bronze medal
3	(Switzerland) Vaud	3	1	0	2	5	6	−1	3	
4	(Finland) Länsi-Vantaan Ylpeys	3	0	1	2	4	6	−2	1	

Source: UEFA
Rules for classification: Tiebreakers
23 June 2025
18:00

Länsi-Vantaan Ylpeys (Finland)	1–1	(Croatia) Rijeka
Nurmi 24' (pen.)	Report	Lagumdžija 50'

Stadio di Montecchio, San Marino
Attendance: 51
Referee: Robertas Valikonis (Lithuania)
23 June 2025
21:30

Vaud (Switzerland)	0–1	(Poland) Lower Silesia
	Report	Olek 38'

Stadio di Montecchio, San Marino
Attendance: 36
Referee: Mads Kristoffersen (Denmark)

25 June 2025
18:00

Länsi-Vantaan Ylpeys (Finland)	2–3	(Switzerland) Vaud
Heinonen 64'; Uzun 68'	Report	Boillot 3'; Benkreira Hanchour 28', 36'

Stadio di Montecchio, San Marino
Attendance: 56
Referee: Dumitri Muntean (Moldova)
25 June 2025
21:30

Lower Silesia (Poland)	1–0	(Croatia) Rijeka
Bąk 81'	Report

Stadio di Montecchio, San Marino
Attendance: 22
Referee: Nikola Popov (Bulgaria)

28 June 2025
18:00

Lower Silesia (Poland)	2–1	(Finland) Länsi-Vantaan Ylpeys
Waliselwski 44' (pen.); Bońkowski 67'	Report	Merinen 83'

Acquaviva Stadium, Acquaviva
Attendance: 49
Referee: Nikola Popov (Bulgaria)
28 June 2025
18:00

Rijeka (Croatia)	3–2	(Switzerland) Vaud
Hodak 52'; Matković 90+3', 90+4'	Report	Benkreira Hanchour 11'; Grand 45+5' (pen.)

Stadio di Montecchio, San Marino
Attendance: 42
Referee: Eldorjan Hamiti (Albania)

=== Final ===
In the final, extra time and penalty shoot-out are used to decide the winners if necessary.

1 July 2025
20:45

Aragon (Spain)	1–0 (a.e.t.)	(Poland) Lower Silesia
Torcal 120+1'	Report

Acquaviva Stadium, Acquaviva
Attendance: 248
Referee: Robertas Valikonis (Lithuania)
