= 2019 UEFA Regions' Cup =

Tournament details
- Host country: Final tournament: Germany
- Dates: Qualifying rounds: 4 June – 24 October 2018; Final tournament: 18–26 June 2019
- Teams: Final tournament: 8 Total: 39 (from 39 associations)

Final positions
- Champions: (Poland) Lower Silesia (2nd title)
- Runners-up: (Germany) Bavaria
- Third place: (Turkey) Istanbul (Spain) Castile and León

Tournament statistics
- Matches played: 79
- Goals scored: 289 (3.66 per match)
- Top scorer(s): Season: (Lithuania) Aretas Gėgžna (7 goals); Final tournament: (Germany) Arif Ekin (3 goals)

The 2019 UEFA Regions' Cup was the 11th edition of the UEFA Regions' Cup, a football competition for amateur teams in Europe organized by UEFA.

In the final, Lower Silesia from Poland defeated hosts Bavaria to become the second two-time Regions' Cup winners (joining Veneto from Italy), after winning their first title in 2007. Zagreb from Croatia were the title holders, but were eliminated in the intermediate round.

== Teams ==
A total of 39 teams entered the tournament. Each of the 55 UEFA member associations could enter a regional amateur representative team which qualified through a national qualifying competition, or when applicable, their national amateur representative team.

Associations were ranked according to their UEFA coefficients, computed based on results of the last three seasons (2013, 2015, 2017), to decide on the round their teams entered and their seeding pots in the preliminary and intermediate round draws. The top 27 associations entered the intermediate round, while the bottom 12 associations (ranked 28–39) entered the preliminary round.

The draws for the preliminary and intermediate rounds was held on 6 December 2017, 13:30 CET (UTC+1), at the UEFA headquarters in Nyon, Switzerland. The mechanism of the draws for each round was as follows:

- In the preliminary round, the twelve teams were drawn into three groups of four without any seeding.
- In the intermediate round, the 32 teams were drawn into eight groups of four. Each group contained one team from Pot A, one team from Pot B, one team from Pot C, and either one team from Pot D or one of the five teams which advanced from the preliminary round (whose identity was not known at the time of the draw):
  - Preliminary round Group A winner would be assigned to Group 1.
  - Preliminary round Group B winner would be assigned to Group 2.
  - Preliminary round Group C winner would be assigned to Group 3.
  - Preliminary round best runner-up would be assigned to Group 4.
  - Preliminary round second best runner-up would be assigned to Group 5.
  - The three teams from Pot D would be drawn to Groups 6–8.

For political reasons, teams from Russia and Ukraine would not be drawn in the same group. The hosts for each group in the preliminary and intermediate rounds would be selected after the draw.

Qualified teams for 2019 UEFA Regions' Cup
| Entry round | Rank | Association | Team | Qualifying competition | Coeff | Pot |
|---|---|---|---|---|---|---|
| Intermediate round | 1 | Croatia | Zagreb | 2018 Croatian stage of the UEFA Regions' Cup | 13.667 | A |
| Intermediate round | 2 | Republic of Ireland | Munster/Ulster (Region 1) | 2018 Republic of Ireland play-off for UEFA Regions' Cup | 13.333 | A |
| Intermediate round | 3 | Spain | Castile and León | 2017–18 Spanish stage of the UEFA Regions' Cup | 12.667 | A |
| Intermediate round | 4 | Russia | Southern Region – SFedU (Rostov Oblast) | 2017/18 IV division Regional federations Winners' 2017 and 2018 Final Games | 12.333 | A |
| Intermediate round | 5 | Italy | Tuscany | 2017 Trofeo delle Regioni Juniores | 12.000 | A |
| Intermediate round | 6 | Turkey | Istanbul | 2018 Turkish stage of the UEFA Regions' Cup | 11.333 | A |
| Intermediate round | 7 | Hungary | Győr-Moson-Sopron County (West Region) | 2017 Hungarian stage of the UEFA Regions' Cup | 11.000 | A |
| Intermediate round | 8 | Germany | Bavaria | Regional amateur team | 10.667 | A |
| Intermediate round | 9 | Poland | (Lower Silesian Voivodeship) Lower Silesia | 2017 Polish stage of the UEFA Regions' Cup | 10.333 | B |
| Intermediate round | 10 | Czech Republic | Hradec Králové Region | 2018 Czech stage of the UEFA Regions' Cup | 10.000 | B |
| Intermediate round | 11 | Northern Ireland | Mid-Ulster/County Antrim (Eastern Region) | 2018 Northern Ireland play-off for UEFA Regions' Cup | 9.167 | B |
| Intermediate round | 12 | Ukraine | Lviv Oblast | 2018 FFU Regions' Cup | 9.000 | B |
| Intermediate round | 13 | Bulgaria | South-West Region | Regional amateur team | 9.000 | B |
| Intermediate round | 14 | France | Normandy | 2018 French stage of the UEFA Regions' Cup | 8.000 | B |
| Intermediate round | 15 | England | (North Riding of Yorkshire) North Riding | 2017–18 FA Inter-League Cup | 7.667 | B |
| Intermediate round | 16 | Serbia | Vojvodina | 2018 Serbian stage of the UEFA Regions' Cup | 7.667 | B |
| Intermediate round | 17 | Belarus | Energetik-BGATU Minsk | 2017 Belarusian stage of the UEFA Regions' Cup | 7.333 | C |
| Intermediate round | 18 | Bosnia and Herzegovina | (Istočno Sarajevo) East Sarajevo | 2018 Bosnian stage of the UEFA Regions' Cup | 7.333 | C |
| Intermediate round | 19 | Slovakia | West Slovakia | 2017 Slovak stage of the UEFA Regions' Cup | 7.000 | C |
| Intermediate round | 20 | Azerbaijan | Uğur Sumqayit | 2016–17 AFFA Amateur League | 7.000 | C |
| Intermediate round | 21 | Portugal | Braga | 2018 Taça das Regiões | 7.000 | C |
| Intermediate round | 22 | Switzerland | Vaud | 2018 Swiss stage of the UEFA Regions' Cup | 6.000 | C |
| Intermediate round | 23 | Latvia | LDZ Cargo/DFA | 2017 Latvian Second League | 5.667 | C |
| Intermediate round | 24 | Malta | Gozo | Regional amateur team | 5.667 | C |
| Intermediate round | 25 | San Marino | San Marino | National amateur team | 5.000 | D |
| Intermediate round | 26 | Moldova | Ialoveni | 2018 Moldovan stage of the UEFA Regions' Cup | 5.000 | D |
| Intermediate round | 27 | Finland | KaaPo (Turku District) | 2017 Finnish stage of the UEFA Regions' Cup | 5.000 | D |
| Preliminary round | 28 | Macedonia | (North Macedonia) Amateurs Macedonia | National amateur team | 4.833 | 1 |
| Preliminary round | 29 | Romania | Buzău County | 2018 Romanian stage of the UEFA Regions' Cup | 4.667 | 1 |
| Preliminary round | 30 | Israel | Ironi Tiberias | 2017–18 Liga Alef play-off | 4.667 | 1 |
| Preliminary round | 31 | Scotland | Central Scotland | Regional amateur team | 4.333 | 1 |
| Preliminary round | 32 | Lithuania | Nevėžis | 2017 LFF I lyga (chosen by association) | 4.333 | 1 |
| Preliminary round | 33 | Sweden | Kozara (Region of Gothenburg) | 2017 Swedish stage of the UEFA Regions' Cup | 4.000 | 1 |
| Preliminary round | 34 | Slovenia | Maribor | 2018 Slovenian stage of the UEFA Regions' Cup | 4.000 | 1 |
| Preliminary round | 35 | Wales | South Wales | 2018 Welsh stage of the UEFA Regions' Cup | 3.333 | 1 |
| Preliminary round | 36 | Greece | Euboea | 2018 Greek stage of the UEFA Regions' Cup | 2.667 | 1 |
| Preliminary round | 37 | Estonia | Paide Linnameeskond III | 2017 Estonian Small Cup | 2.000 | 1 |
| Preliminary round | 38 | Kazakhstan | Dostar Astana | 2017 Kazakh stage of the UEFA Regions' Cup | 1.000 | 1 |
| Preliminary round | 39 | Georgia | Chabonama | 2017 Georgian stage of the UEFA Regions' Cup | — | 1 |

Associations which did not enter
| Albania | Andorra | Armenia | Austria |
| Belgium | Cyprus | Denmark | Faroe Islands |
| Gibraltar | Iceland | Kosovo | Liechtenstein |
| Luxembourg | Montenegro | Netherlands | Norway |

== Format ==
In the preliminary round and intermediate round, each group is played as a round-robin mini-tournament at one of the teams selected as hosts after the draw.

In the final tournament, the eight qualified teams play a group stage (two groups of four) followed by the final between the group winners, at a host selected by UEFA from one of the teams.

In the preliminary round, intermediate round and final tournament, the schedule of each group is as follows, with two rest days between each matchday, except for between matchdays 1 and 2 in the final tournament where there is only one rest day (Regulations Articles 19.04 and 19.07):

Group schedule
| Matchday | Matches |
|---|---|
| Matchday 1 | 1 v 4, 3 v 2 |
| Matchday 2 | 1 v 3, 2 v 4 |
| Matchday 3 | 2 v 1, 4 v 3 |

=== Tiebreakers ===
In the preliminary round, intermediate round, and group stage of the final tournament, teams are ranked according to points (3 points for a win, 1 point for a draw, 0 points for a loss), and if tied on points, the following tiebreaking criteria are applied, in the order given, to determine the rankings (Regulations Articles 14.01, 14.02, 16.01 and 16.02):

1. Points in head-to-head matches among tied teams;
2. Goal difference in head-to-head matches among tied teams;
3. Goals scored in head-to-head matches among tied teams;
4. If more than two teams are tied, and after applying all head-to-head criteria above, a subset of teams are still tied, all head-to-head criteria above are reapplied exclusively to this subset of teams;
5. Goal difference in all group matches;
6. Goals scored in all group matches;
7. Penalty shoot-out if only two teams have the same number of points, and they met in the last round of the group and are tied after applying all criteria above (not used if more than two teams have the same number of points, or if their rankings are not relevant for qualification for the next stage);
8. Disciplinary points (red card = 3 points, yellow card = 1 point, expulsion for two yellow cards in one match = 3 points);
9. UEFA coefficient;
10. Drawing of lots.

== Preliminary round ==
The three group winners and the two best runners-up advance to the intermediate round to join the 27 teams which receive byes to the intermediate round. The preliminary round must be played by 31 July 2018.

Times are CEST (UTC+2), as listed by UEFA (local times, if different, are in parentheses).

=== Group A ===
| Pos | Team | Pld | W | D | L | GF | GA | GD | Pts | Qualification |
|---|---|---|---|---|---|---|---|---|---|---|
| 1 | (North Macedonia) Amateurs Macedonia | 3 | 2 | 0 | 1 | 3 | 2 | +1 | 6 (Note: Head-to-head result: South Wales 1–2 Amateurs Macedonia.) | Intermediate round |
| 2 | South Wales (H) | 3 | 2 | 0 | 1 | 10 | 2 | +8 | 6 | Intermediate round |
| 3 | (Greece) Euboea | 3 | 1 | 1 | 1 | 3 | 6 | −3 | 4 | |
| 4 | (Sweden) Kozara | 3 | 0 | 1 | 2 | 2 | 8 | −6 | 1 | |

Source: UEFA
Rules for classification: Tiebreakers
(H) Hosts
Notes:
4 June 2018
16:00 (15:00 BST)

| Amateurs Macedonia (North Macedonia) | 0–1 | (Greece) Euboea |
|---|---|---|
| | Report | Karantakis 8' |

Cyncoed Stadium, Cardiff
Referee: Alex Troleis (Faroe Islands)
4 June 2018
20:00 (19:00 BST)

| South Wales | 5–0 | (Sweden) Kozara |
|---|---|---|
| Jenkins 5' (pen.); Evans 16'; Colvin-Owen 36', 52'; Quick 54' | Report |

Jenner Park Stadium, Barry
Referee: Stanislav Todorov (Bulgaria)

7 June 2018
16:00 (15:00 BST)

| Euboea (Greece) | 2–2 | (Sweden) Kozara |
|---|---|---|
| Aggelatos 7'; Karantakis 64' | Report | Araya 71'; Coaney 87' |

Cyncoed Stadium, Cardiff
Referee: Alex Troleis (Faroe Islands)
7 June 2018
20:00 (19:00 BST)

| South Wales | 1–2 | (North Macedonia) Amateurs Macedonia |
|---|---|---|
| Quick 89' | Report | Lukarov 57'; Mirchevski 72' |

Jenner Park Stadium, Barry
Referee: Veaceslav Banari (Moldova)

10 June 2018
17:00 (16:00 BST)

| Euboea (Greece) | 0–4 | South Wales |
|---|---|---|
| | Report | Keating 1'; Long 51' (pen.); Lloyd 73'; Phillips 87' |

Jenner Park Stadium, Barry
Referee: Stanislav Todorov (Bulgaria)
10 June 2018
17:00 (16:00 BST)

| Kozara (Sweden) | 0–1 | (North Macedonia) Amateurs Macedonia |
|---|---|---|
| | Report | Hristov 62' |

Cyncoed Stadium, Cardiff
Referee: Veaceslav Banari (Moldova)

=== Group B ===
| Pos | Team | Pld | W | D | L | GF | GA | GD | Pts | Qualification |
|---|---|---|---|---|---|---|---|---|---|---|
| 1 | (Romania) Buzău County | 3 | 3 | 0 | 0 | 9 | 2 | +7 | 9 | Intermediate round |
| 2 | (Slovenia) Maribor (H) | 3 | 1 | 1 | 1 | 5 | 6 | −1 | 4 | |
| 3 | Central Scotland | 3 | 0 | 2 | 1 | 5 | 6 | −1 | 2 | |
| 4 | (Georgia (country)) Chabonama | 3 | 0 | 1 | 2 | 3 | 8 | −5 | 1 | |

Source: UEFA
Rules for classification: Tiebreakers
(H) Hosts
5 June 2018
13:30

| Buzău County (Romania) | 2–1 | Central Scotland |
|---|---|---|
| Bruce 67' (o.g.); Babageanu 84' | Report | Fotheringham 16' |

Dravograd Sports Centre, Dravograd
Referee: Jovan Kaluđerović (Montenegro)
5 June 2018
17:30

| Chabonama (Georgia (country)) | 1–2 | (Slovenia) Maribor |
|---|---|---|
| Korkia 62' | Report | Sredenšek 48'; Gajić 54' |

Dravograd Sports Centre, Dravograd
Referee: Nenad Đokić (Serbia)

8 June 2018
13:30

| Buzău County (Romania) | 5–1 | (Georgia (country)) Chabonama |
|---|---|---|
| Mihaescu 16', 30' (pen.), 69'; Serbanoiu 35'; Balan 90+2' | Report | Pargalava 11' |

Dravograd Sports Centre, Dravograd
Referee: Luis Teixeira (Portugal)
8 June 2018
17:30

| Maribor (Slovenia) | 3–3 | Central Scotland |
|---|---|---|
| Gajić 36'; Kogelnik 55', 59' | Report | McCracken 24', 57'; Moore 52' |

Dravograd Sports Centre, Dravograd
Referee: Jovan Kaluđerović (Montenegro)

11 June 2018
17:30

| Maribor (Slovenia) | 0–2 | (Romania) Buzău County |
|---|---|---|
| | Report | Mihaescu 19' (pen.), 79' |

Dravograd Sports Centre, Dravograd
Referee: Nenad Đokić (Serbia)
11 June 2018
17:30

| Central Scotland | 1–1 | (Georgia (country)) Chabonama |
|---|---|---|
| Moore 70' (pen.) | Report | Pargalava 21' |

Mestni Stadion, Ravne na Koroškem
Referee: Luis Teixeira (Portugal)

=== Group C ===
| Pos | Team | Pld | W | D | L | GF | GA | GD | Pts | Qualification |
|---|---|---|---|---|---|---|---|---|---|---|
| 1 | (Lithuania) Nevėžis (H) | 3 | 3 | 0 | 0 | 17 | 3 | +14 | 9 | Intermediate round |
| 2 | (Israel) Ironi Tiberias | 3 | 2 | 0 | 1 | 10 | 5 | +5 | 6 | Intermediate round |
| 3 | (Kazakhstan) Dostar Astana | 3 | 1 | 0 | 2 | 3 | 6 | −3 | 3 | |
| 4 | (Estonia) Paide Linnameeskond III | 3 | 0 | 0 | 3 | 1 | 17 | −16 | 0 | |

Source: UEFA
Rules for classification: Tiebreakers
(H) Hosts
17 July 2018
13:00 (14:00 EEST)

| Dostar Astana (Kazakhstan) | 1–0 | (Estonia) Paide Linnameeskond III |
|---|---|---|
| Myngatov 81' | Report |

Birštono sporto centro stadionas, Birštonas
Referee: Zaven Hovhannisyan (Armenia)
17 July 2018
13:00 (14:00 EEST)

| Nevėžis (Lithuania) | 4–1 | (Israel) Ironi Tiberias |
|---|---|---|
| Giedraitis 81', 83'; Kugys 85'; Lipnevicius 90+3' | Report | Abeles 29' |

Sūduva Stadium, Marijampolė
Referee: Paul Mclaughlin (Republic of Ireland)

20 July 2018
14:00 (15:00 EEST)

| Ironi Tiberias (Israel) | 6–0 | (Estonia) Paide Linnameeskond III |
|---|---|---|
| Brami 17', 46'; Mrad 32' (pen.), 45+2'; Maaravi 35'; Abeles 56' | Report |

Birštono sporto centro stadionas, Birštonas
Referee: Zaven Hovhannisyan (Armenia)
20 July 2018
18:00 (19:00 EEST)

| Dostar Astana (Kazakhstan) | 1–3 | (Lithuania) Nevėžis |
|---|---|---|
| Lapin 24' | Report | Rakasius 18'; Gėgžna 66' (pen.), 85' |

Sūduva Stadium, Marijampolė
Referee: Vasilis Dimitriou (Cyprus)

23 July 2018
16:00 (17:00 EEST)

| Ironi Tiberias (Israel) | 3–1 | (Kazakhstan) Dostar Astana |
|---|---|---|
| Elharar 32'; Brami 66'; Fahima 72' | Report | Goncharov 90+4' |

Birštono sporto centro stadionas, Birštonas
Referee: Vasilis Dimitriou (Cyprus)
23 July 2018
16:00 (17:00 EEST)

| Paide Linnameeskond III (Estonia) | 1–10 | (Lithuania) Nevėžis |
|---|---|---|
| Nurmik 56' | Report | Giedraitis 20', 53', 67', 86'; Gėgžna 23' (pen.), 26', 76' (pen.), 81'; Lipnevicius 31', 80' |

Sūduva Stadium, Marijampolė
Referee: Paul Mclaughlin (Republic of Ireland)

=== Ranking of second-placed teams ===
| Pos | Grp | Team | Pld | W | D | L | GF | GA | GD | Pts | Qualification |
|---|---|---|---|---|---|---|---|---|---|---|---|
| 1 | A | South Wales | 3 | 2 | 0 | 1 | 10 | 2 | +8 | 6 | Intermediate round |
| 2 | C | (Israel) Ironi Tiberias | 3 | 2 | 0 | 1 | 10 | 5 | +5 | 6 | Intermediate round |
| 3 | B | (Slovenia) Maribor | 3 | 1 | 1 | 1 | 5 | 6 | −1 | 4 | |

Source: UEFA
Rules for classification: Tiebreakers

== Intermediate round ==
The eight group winners advance to the final tournament. The intermediate round must be played by 16 December 2018.

Times are CEST (UTC+2), as listed by UEFA (local times, if different, are in parentheses).

=== Group 1 ===
| Pos | Team | Pld | W | D | L | GF | GA | GD | Pts | Qualification |
|---|---|---|---|---|---|---|---|---|---|---|
| 1 | (Russia) Southern Region – SFedU | 3 | 2 | 1 | 0 | 7 | 2 | +5 | 7 | Final tournament |
| 2 | (Portugal) Braga | 3 | 2 | 1 | 0 | 5 | 3 | +2 | 7 | |
| 3 | (Northern Ireland) Mid-Ulster/County Antrim (H) | 3 | 1 | 0 | 2 | 3 | 4 | −1 | 3 | |
| 4 | (North Macedonia) Amateurs Macedonia | 3 | 0 | 0 | 3 | 1 | 7 | −6 | 0 | |

Source: UEFA
Rules for classification: Tiebreakers
(H) Hosts
18 October 2018
15:00 (14:00 BST)

| Southern Region – SFedU (Russia) | 4–0 | (North Macedonia) Amateurs Macedonia |
|---|---|---|
| Bogdanov 39'; Zbrodov 46'; Nastavshev 64'; Tishchenko 89' | Report |

The Showgrounds, Coleraine
Referee: Eldorjan Hamiti (Albania)
18 October 2018
20:30 (19:30 BST)

| Braga (Portugal) | 2–1 | (Northern Ireland) Mid-Ulster/County Antrim |
|---|---|---|
| Carneiro 33'; Fernandes 61' (pen.) | Report | Gibson 13' |

Stangmore Park, Dungannon
Referee: Aleksandrs Golubevs (Latvia)

21 October 2018
13:00 (14:00 BST)

| Southern Region – SFedU (Russia) | 1–1 | (Portugal) Braga |
|---|---|---|
| Lednev 6' (pen.) | Report | Rocha 58' |

Windsor Park, Belfast
Referee: Thoroddur Hjaltalin (Iceland)
21 October 2018
18:30 (17:30 BST)

| Mid-Ulster/County Antrim (Northern Ireland) | 1–0 | (North Macedonia) Amateurs Macedonia |
|---|---|---|
| Wilson 42' | Report |

Windsor Park, Belfast
Referee: Aleksandrs Golubevs (Latvia)

24 October 2018
20:30 (19:30 BST)

| Mid-Ulster/County Antrim (Northern Ireland) | 1–2 | (Russia) Southern Region – SFedU |
|---|---|---|
| Gray 43' | Report | Nastavshev 34', 86' |

Mourneview Park, Lurgan
Referee: Thoroddur Hjaltalin (Iceland)
24 October 2018
20:30 (19:30 BST)

| Amateurs Macedonia (North Macedonia) | 1–2 | (Portugal) Braga |
|---|---|---|
| Mirchevski 80' | Report | Fernandes 39' (pen.); Rego 75' |

Shamrock Park, Portadown
Referee: Eldorjan Hamiti (Albania)

=== Group 2 ===
Note: Slovakia were originally to host.

| Pos | Team | Pld | W | D | L | GF | GA | GD | Pts | Qualification |
|---|---|---|---|---|---|---|---|---|---|---|
| 1 | West Slovakia | 3 | 1 | 2 | 0 | 7 | 4 | +3 | 5 | Final tournament |
| 2 | (Romania) Buzău County (H) | 3 | 1 | 1 | 1 | 5 | 7 | −2 | 4 | |
| 3 | (England) North Riding | 3 | 0 | 3 | 0 | 5 | 5 | 0 | 3 | |
| 4 | (Republic of Ireland) Munster/Ulster | 3 | 0 | 2 | 1 | 3 | 4 | −1 | 2 | |

Source: UEFA
Rules for classification: Tiebreakers
(H) Hosts
16 September 2018
14:00 (15:00 EEST)

| West Slovakia | 2–2 | (England) North Riding |
|---|---|---|
| Holíček 13'; Pilný 79' | Report | McQueeney 46'; Rose 50' |

Stadionul Municipal, Buzău
Referee: Jason Barcelo (Gibraltar)
16 September 2018
18:30 (19:30 EEST)

| Munster/Ulster (Republic of Ireland) | 1–2 | (Romania) Buzău County |
|---|---|---|
| Kelly 87' | Report | Ionita 50'; Modruz 80' |

Stadionul Municipal, Buzău
Referee: Suren Baliyan (Armenia)

19 September 2018
14:00 (15:00 EEST)

| Munster/Ulster (Republic of Ireland) | 1–1 | West Slovakia |
|---|---|---|
| Falvey 31' | Report | Martinko 51' |

Stadionul Municipal, Buzău
Referee: Denis Scherbakov (Belarus)
19 September 2018
18:30 (19:30 EEST)

| North Riding (England) | 2–2 | (Romania) Buzău County |
|---|---|---|
| Rose 79' (pen.); Bellamy 90+7' (pen.) | Report | Babageanu 33'; Visteanu 62' |

Stadionul Municipal, Buzău
Referee: Suren Baliyan (Armenia)

22 September 2018
16:00 (17:00 EEST)

| North Riding (England) | 1–1 | (Republic of Ireland) Munster/Ulster |
|---|---|---|
| Keenan 17' | Report | Ryan 87' |

Stadionul Municipal, Râmnicu Sărat
Referee: Denis Scherbakov (Belarus)
22 September 2018
16:00 (17:00 EEST)

| Buzău County (Romania) | 1–4 | West Slovakia |
|---|---|---|
| Balan 74' | Report | Hrenák 10'; Zavadzan 51'; Martinko 78'; Vaculík 90+1' |

Stadionul Municipal, Buzău
Referee: Jason Barcelo (Gibraltar)

=== Group 3 ===
| Pos | Team | Pld | W | D | L | GF | GA | GD | Pts | Qualification |
|---|---|---|---|---|---|---|---|---|---|---|
| 1 | (France) Normandy | 3 | 3 | 0 | 0 | 19 | 1 | +18 | 9 | Final tournament |
| 2 | (Croatia) Zagreb (H) | 3 | 2 | 0 | 1 | 17 | 4 | +13 | 6 | |
| 3 | (Lithuania) Nevėžis | 3 | 1 | 0 | 2 | 3 | 16 | −13 | 3 | |
| 4 | (Latvia) LDZ Cargo/DFA | 3 | 0 | 0 | 3 | 1 | 19 | −18 | 0 | |

Source: UEFA
Rules for classification: Tiebreakers
(H) Hosts
12 September 2018
16:30

| Zagreb (Croatia) | 8–0 | (Lithuania) Nevėžis |
|---|---|---|
| Petrénas 21' (o.g.); Colarić 35'; Štulec 41', 69', 71'; Brujić 59'; Kelava 81'; Čibarić 83' | Report |

Gradski stadion Zelina, Sveti Ivan Zelina
Attendance: 280
Referee: Sándor Andó-Szabó (Hungary)
12 September 2018
16:30

| LDZ Cargo/DFA (Latvia) | 0–8 | (France) Normandy |
|---|---|---|
| | Report | Roynel 42'; Vauvy 45+2', 54', 84'; Sahloune 65'; Mendy 73'; Levasseur 87'; Auzou 90' |

Gradski stadion Dugo Selo, Dugo Selo
Attendance: 50
Referee: Vitaliy Romanov (Ukraine)

15 September 2018
16:30

| Zagreb (Croatia) | 8–0 | (Latvia) LDZ Cargo/DFA |
|---|---|---|
| Ivkovčić 45+1'; Štulec 47', 58'; Slišković 60'; Martinović 67', 75', 84'; Krajačić 87' | Report |

Gradski stadion Dugo Selo, Dugo Selo
Attendance: 269
Referee: Rahim Hasanov (Azerbaijan)
15 September 2018
16:30

| Normandy (France) | 7–0 | (Lithuania) Nevėžis |
|---|---|---|
| Tessier 14'; Mendy 18', 78'; Roynel 44', 53'; Sahloune 54'; Vauvy 90+2' | Report |

Gradski stadion Zelina, Sveti Ivan Zelina
Attendance: 70
Referee: Vitaliy Romanov (Ukraine)

18 September 2018
16:30

| Normandy (France) | 4–1 | (Croatia) Zagreb |
|---|---|---|
| Roynel 32'; Vauvy 35', 39'; Mendy 90+3' | Report | Štulec 23' (pen.) |

Gradski stadion Zelina, Sveti Ivan Zelina
Attendance: 358
Referee: Sándor Andó-Szabó (Hungary)
18 September 2018
16:30

| Nevėžis (Lithuania) | 3–1 | (Latvia) LDZ Cargo/DFA |
|---|---|---|
| Sipavicus 2'; Gėgžna 69'; Kugys 89' | Report | Travkins 72' (pen.) |

Gradski stadion Dugo Selo, Dugo Selo
Attendance: 57
Referee: Rahim Hasanov (Azerbaijan)

=== Group 4 ===
| Pos | Team | Pld | W | D | L | GF | GA | GD | Pts | Qualification |
|---|---|---|---|---|---|---|---|---|---|---|
| 1 | (Turkey) Istanbul | 3 | 3 | 0 | 0 | 12 | 3 | +9 | 9 | Final tournament |
| 2 | (Bulgaria) South-West Region (H) | 3 | 2 | 0 | 1 | 9 | 6 | +3 | 6 | |
| 3 | South Wales | 3 | 1 | 0 | 2 | 7 | 12 | −5 | 3 | |
| 4 | (Belarus) Energetik-BGATU Minsk | 3 | 0 | 0 | 3 | 2 | 9 | −7 | 0 | |

Source: UEFA
Rules for classification: Tiebreakers
(H) Hosts
4 October 2018
14:30 (15:30 EEST)

| Istanbul (Turkey) | 6–2 | South Wales |
|---|---|---|
| Güner 4', 33'; Topal 18', 36', 90+3'; Yiten 43' | Report | Quick 74', 79' |

Hadzhi Dimitar Stadium, Sliven
Referee: Radek Příhoda (Czech Republic)
4 October 2018
14:30 (15:30 EEST)

| Energetik-BGATU Minsk (Belarus) | 1–3 | (Bulgaria) South-West Region |
|---|---|---|
| Avizhen 40' | Report | Tsakovski 16'; Kazakov 68' (pen.); Radev 71' |

Trace Arena, Stara Zagora
Referee: Jovan Kaluđerović (Montenegro)

7 October 2018
14:30 (15:30 EEST)

| Istanbul (Turkey) | 3–0 | (Belarus) Energetik-BGATU Minsk |
|---|---|---|
| Aydin 55', 90+4'; Öztürk 85' | Report |

Trace Arena, Stara Zagora
Referee: Besfort Kasumi (Kosovo)
7 October 2018
14:30 (15:30 EEST)

| South-West Region (Bulgaria) | 5–2 | South Wales |
|---|---|---|
| Graminov 2'; Long 29' (o.g.); Tsakovski 43'; Kazakov 66' (pen.); Iliev 90+1' | Report | Colvin-Owen 9'; Brogden 86' (pen.) |

Hadzhi Dimitar Stadium, Sliven
Referee: Radek Příhoda (Czech Republic)

10 October 2018
14:30 (15:30 EEST)

| South-West Region (Bulgaria) | 1–3 | (Turkey) Istanbul |
|---|---|---|
| Tsakovski 5' | Report | Gönen 30'; Güner 60'; Arslan 90+3' |

Trace Arena, Stara Zagora
Referee: Jovan Kaluđerović (Montenegro)
10 October 2018
14:30 (15:30 EEST)

| South Wales | 3–1 | (Belarus) Energetik-BGATU Minsk |
|---|---|---|
| Colvin-Owen 36', 49'; Gulley 78' | Report | Khrapko 33' |

Hadzhi Dimitar Stadium, Sliven
Referee: Besfort Kasumi (Kosovo)

=== Group 5 ===
| Pos | Team | Pld | W | D | L | GF | GA | GD | Pts | Qualification |
|---|---|---|---|---|---|---|---|---|---|---|
| 1 | (Germany) Bavaria (H) | 3 | 2 | 0 | 1 | 9 | 2 | +7 | 6 (Note: Head-to-head results: Bavaria 1–2 Ironi Tiberias, Vojvodina 1–0 Ironi Tiberias, Vojvodina 0–2 Bavaria. Head-to-head standings: Bavaria: 3 pts, +1 GD (3 GF, 2 GA); Ironi Tiberias: 3 pts, 0 GD (2 GF, 2 GA); Vojvodina: 3 pts, −1 GD (1 GF, 2 GA)) | Final tournament |
| 2 | (Israel) Ironi Tiberias | 3 | 2 | 0 | 1 | 5 | 3 | +2 | 6 | |
| 3 | (Serbia) Vojvodina | 3 | 2 | 0 | 1 | 5 | 2 | +3 | 6 | |
| 4 | (Malta) Gozo | 3 | 0 | 0 | 3 | 1 | 13 | −12 | 0 | |

Source: UEFA
Rules for classification: Tiebreakers
(H) Hosts
Notes:
27 September 2018
11:00

| Bavaria (Germany) | 1–2 | (Israel) Ironi Tiberias |
|---|---|---|
| Luburic 58' (pen.) | Report | Abu Raiya 68'; Cohen 82' |

Anton-Treffer-Stadion, Neustadt an der Donau
Referee: Mikhail Vilkov (Russia)
27 September 2018
17:00

| Gozo (Malta) | 0–4 | (Serbia) Vojvodina |
|---|---|---|
| | Report | Hađinac 13'; Grima 25' (o.g.); Šavija 58'; Papović 85' |

Anton-Treffer-Stadion, Neustadt an der Donau
Referee: Roomer Tarajev (Estonia)

30 September 2018
12:30

| Vojvodina (Serbia) | 1–0 | (Israel) Ironi Tiberias |
|---|---|---|
| Arbutina 15' | Report |

Stadion Hankofen, Leiblfing
Referee: Roomer Tarajev (Estonia)
30 September 2018
17:00

| Bavaria (Germany) | 6–0 | (Malta) Gozo |
|---|---|---|
| Marx 26'; Fromholzer 50'; Gebhart 55'; Fischer 60'; Nagengast 81'; Bauer 86' (pen.) | Report |

Stadion Hankofen, Leiblfing
Referee: Barbeno Luca (San Marino)

3 October 2018
14:00

| Vojvodina (Serbia) | 0–2 | (Germany) Bavaria |
|---|---|---|
| | Report | Luburic 9'; Bauer 51' |

Georg-Weber-Stadion, Rain
Referee: Mikhail Vilkov (Russia)
3 October 2018
14:00

| Ironi Tiberias (Israel) | 3–1 | (Malta) Gozo |
|---|---|---|
| Haker 10'; Yada'N 80'; Cohen 90' | Report | Mizzi 65' |

Anton-Treffer-Stadion, Neustadt an der Donau
Referee: Barbeno Luca (San Marino)

=== Group 6 ===
| Pos | Team | Pld | W | D | L | GF | GA | GD | Pts | Qualification |
|---|---|---|---|---|---|---|---|---|---|---|
| 1 | (Spain) Castile and León | 3 | 3 | 0 | 0 | 5 | 1 | +4 | 9 | Final tournament |
| 2 | (Ukraine) Lviv Oblast (H) | 3 | 2 | 0 | 1 | 5 | 1 | +4 | 6 | |
| 3 | (Finland) KaaPo | 3 | 1 | 0 | 2 | 3 | 4 | −1 | 3 | |
| 4 | (Azerbaijan) Uğur | 3 | 0 | 0 | 3 | 1 | 8 | −7 | 0 | |

Source: UEFA
Rules for classification: Tiebreakers
(H) Hosts
2 October 2018
12:00 (13:00 EEST)

| Castile and León (Spain) | 2–1 | (Finland) KaaPo |
|---|---|---|
| Taranilla Iglesias 61'; Sanz Bravo 76' | Report | Kuusio 40' (pen.) |

Bohdan Markevych Stadium, Vynnyky
Referee: Dimitrios Massias (Cyprus)
2 October 2018
14:00 (15:00 EEST)

| Uğur (Azerbaijan) | 0–4 | (Ukraine) Lviv Oblast |
|---|---|---|
| | Report | Kit-Kopyliak 17'; Tsyupka 75'; Mykhalchuk 84'; Fostakovskyi 89' |

Skif Stadium, Lviv
Referee: João Capela (Portugal)

5 October 2018
12:00 (13:00 EEST)

| Castile and León (Spain) | 2–0 | (Azerbaijan) Uğur |
|---|---|---|
| Rodríguez Álvarez 68'; Alonso López 85' | Report |

Bohdan Markevych Stadium, Vynnyky
Referee: Veaceslav Banari (Moldova)
5 October 2018
14:00 (15:00 EEST)

| Lviv Oblast (Ukraine) | 1–0 | (Finland) KaaPo |
|---|---|---|
| Mykhalchuk 5' (pen.) | Report |

Skif Stadium, Lviv
Referee: Dimitrios Massias (Cyprus)

8 October 2018
13:00 (14:00 EEST)

| Lviv Oblast (Ukraine) | 0–1 | (Spain) Castile and León |
|---|---|---|
| | Report | De la Iglesia Lerma 72' |

Skif Stadium, Lviv
Referee: João Capela (Portugal)
8 October 2018
13:00 (14:00 EEST)

| KaaPo (Finland) | 2–1 | (Azerbaijan) Uğur |
|---|---|---|
| Luoma 66'; Ruuskanen 84' | Report | Pashayev 72' |

Bohdan Markevych Stadium, Vynnyky
Referee: Veaceslav Banari (Moldova)

=== Group 7 ===
| Pos | Team | Pld | W | D | L | GF | GA | GD | Pts | Qualification |
|---|---|---|---|---|---|---|---|---|---|---|
| 1 | (Czech Republic) Hradec Králové Region (H) | 3 | 2 | 1 | 0 | 6 | 0 | +6 | 7 | Final tournament |
| 2 | (Hungary) Győr-Moson-Sopron County | 3 | 2 | 1 | 0 | 5 | 3 | +2 | 7 | |
| 3 | (Bosnia and Herzegovina) East Sarajevo | 3 | 1 | 0 | 2 | 5 | 9 | −4 | 3 | |
| 4 | San Marino | 3 | 0 | 0 | 3 | 3 | 7 | −4 | 0 | |

Source: UEFA
Rules for classification: Tiebreakers
(H) Hosts
14 June 2018
17:00

| Győr-Moson-Sopron County (Hungary) | 2–1 | San Marino |
|---|---|---|
| Rigó 7'; Honyák 52' | Report | Angelini 89' (pen.) |

Atletický stadion Vejsplachy, Vrchlabí
Referee: Giorgi Kruashvili (Georgia)
14 June 2018
17:00

| East Sarajevo (Bosnia and Herzegovina) | 0–4 | (Czech Republic) Hradec Králové Region |
|---|---|---|
| | Report | Hlava 27'; Kejzlar 32', 78'; Moravec 69' |

Stadion Osvobození Trutnov, Trutnov
Referee: Alexandros Aretopoulos (Greece)

17 June 2018
11:00

| Győr-Moson-Sopron County (Hungary) | 3–2 | (Bosnia and Herzegovina) East Sarajevo |
|---|---|---|
| Füleki 16'; Honyák 33'; Kiss 62' | Report | Blagojević 56', 81' |

Stadion Osvobození Trutnov, Trutnov
Referee: Fyodor Zammit (Malta)
17 June 2018
11:00

| Hradec Králové Region (Czech Republic) | 2–0 | San Marino |
|---|---|---|
| Kejzlar 7'; Holec 90+1' | Report |

Atletický stadion Vejsplachy, Vrchlabí
Referee: Giorgi Kruashvili (Georgia)

20 June 2018
17:00

| Hradec Králové Region (Czech Republic) | 0–0 | (Hungary) Győr-Moson-Sopron County |
|---|---|---|
| | Report |

Stadion Osvobození Trutnov, Trutnov
Referee: Alexandros Aretopoulos (Greece)
20 June 2018
17:00

| San Marino | 2–3 | (Bosnia and Herzegovina) East Sarajevo |
|---|---|---|
| Angelini 20'; Ceccaroli 77' | Report | Blagojević 68', 79'; Damjanović 81' |

Atletický stadion Vejsplachy, Vrchlabí
Referee: Fyodor Zammit (Malta)

=== Group 8 ===
| Pos | Team | Pld | W | D | L | GF | GA | GD | Pts | Qualification |
|---|---|---|---|---|---|---|---|---|---|---|
| 1 | (Poland) Lower Silesia | 3 | 2 | 0 | 1 | 8 | 3 | +5 | 6 (Note: Head-to-head results: Vaud 1–3 Lower Silesia, Tuscany 2–3 Vaud, Lower Silesia 1–2 Tuscany. Head-to-head standings: Lower Silesia: 3 pts, +1 GD (4 GF, 3 GA); Tuscany: 3 pts, 0 GD (4 GF, 4 GA); Vaud: 3 pts, −1 GD (4 GF, 5 GA)) | Final tournament |
| 2 | (Italy) Tuscany (H) | 3 | 2 | 0 | 1 | 8 | 5 | +3 | 6 | |
| 3 | (Switzerland) Vaud | 3 | 2 | 0 | 1 | 10 | 5 | +5 | 6 | |
| 4 | (Moldova) Ialoveni | 3 | 0 | 0 | 3 | 1 | 14 | −13 | 0 | |

Source: UEFA
Rules for classification: Tiebreakers
(H) Hosts
Notes:
9 October 2018
15:00

| Tuscany (Italy) | 4–1 | (Moldova) Ialoveni |
|---|---|---|
| Guidotti 16', 32'; Andreotti 62'; Gorelli 77' | Report | Demian 84' |

Stadio Comunale Daniele Mariotti, Montecatini Terme
Referee: Bojan Nikolić (Serbia)
9 October 2018
15:00

| Vaud (Switzerland) | 1–3 | (Poland) Lower Silesia |
|---|---|---|
| Bunjaku 8' | Report | Magdziak 68'; Traczyk 74'; Buryło 90+3' |

Centro Sportivo Giovanni Bui, San Giuliano Terme
Referee: Stanislav Todorov (Bulgaria)

12 October 2018
15:00

| Tuscany (Italy) | 2–3 | (Switzerland) Vaud |
|---|---|---|
| Barbero 45'; Guidotti 60' | Report | La Rosa 28' (o.g.); Bersier 74'; Brahimi 80' |

Stadio Comunale Germano Bellucci, Agliana
Referee: Georgi Vadachkoria (Georgia)
12 October 2018
15:00

| Lower Silesia (Poland) | 4–0 | (Moldova) Ialoveni |
|---|---|---|
| Traczyk 3'; Galas 43'; Bońkowski 53'; Kluzek 84' | Report |

Stadio Comunale Daniele Mariotti, Montecatini Terme
Referee: Bojan Nikolić (Serbia)

15 October 2018
15:00

| Lower Silesia (Poland) | 1–2 | (Italy) Tuscany |
|---|---|---|
| Jaros 44' | Report | Sciapi 77'; Rossi 90+1' |

Centro Sportivo Giovanni Bui, San Giuliano Terme
Referee: Stanislav Todorov (Bulgaria)
15 October 2018
15:00

| Ialoveni (Moldova) | 0–6 | (Switzerland) Vaud |
|---|---|---|
| | Report | Bunjaku 5' (pen.), 63', 67'; Jalba 33' (o.g.); Bersier 44' (pen.), 84' |

Stadio Comunale Germano Bellucci, Agliana
Referee: Georgi Vadachkoria (Georgia)

== Final tournament ==
The hosts of the final tournament were selected by UEFA from the eight qualified teams. Bavaria were announced as hosts on 18 December 2018, with the final tournament taking place between 18–26 June 2019.

=== Qualified teams ===
The following teams qualified for the final tournament.

| Team | Method of qualification | Date of qualification |
|---|---|---|
| (Russia) Southern Region – SFedU | Intermediate round Group 1 winners | 24 October 2018 |
| West Slovakia | Intermediate round Group 2 winners | 22 September 2018 |
| (France) Normandy | Intermediate round Group 3 winners | 18 September 2018 |
| (Turkey) Istanbul | Intermediate round Group 4 winners | 10 October 2018 |
| (Germany) Bavaria (hosts) | Intermediate round Group 5 winners | 3 October 2018 |
| (Spain) Castile and León | Intermediate round Group 6 winners | 8 October 2018 |
| (Czech Republic) Hradec Králové Region | Intermediate round Group 7 winners | 20 June 2018 |
| (Poland) Lower Silesia | Intermediate round Group 8 winners | 15 October 2018 |

=== Final draw ===
The draw for the final tournament was held on 13 March 2019, at half-time of the UEFA Champions League round of 16 second leg between Bayern Munich and Liverpool (kick-off 21:00 local time), at the Allianz Arena in Munich. The eight teams were drawn into two groups of four without any seeding, except that the hosts Bavaria were assigned to position A1 in the draw.

=== Venues ===
The tournament was held in five venues in Bavaria:

- Wacker-Arena, Burghausen
- Stadion Hankofen, Leiblfing
- Städtisches Stadion, Kelheim
- Hammerbachstadion, Landshut
- Anton-Treffer-Stadion, Neustadt an der Donau

=== Group stage ===
The schedule of the final tournament was announced on 28 March 2019.

The two group winners advance to the final, while the two group runners-up receive bronze medals.

Times are CEST (UTC+2), as listed by UEFA.

==== Group A ====
| Pos | Team | Pld | W | D | L | GF | GA | GD | Pts | Qualification |
|---|---|---|---|---|---|---|---|---|---|---|
| 1 | (Germany) Bavaria (H) | 3 | 2 | 1 | 0 | 3 | 1 | +2 | 7 | Final |
| 2 | (Turkey) Istanbul | 3 | 2 | 0 | 1 | 5 | 3 | +2 | 6 | Bronze medal |
| 3 | (France) Normandy | 3 | 1 | 0 | 2 | 3 | 3 | 0 | 3 | |
| 4 | West Slovakia | 3 | 0 | 1 | 2 | 2 | 6 | −4 | 1 | |

Source: UEFA
Rules for classification: Tiebreakers
(H) Hosts
18 June 2019
14:00

| West Slovakia | 1–3 | (Turkey) Istanbul |
|---|---|---|
| Bartoš 4' | Report | Topal 28', 45+4'; Geçgel 90+1' |

Städtisches Stadion, Kelheim
Referee: Roomer Tarajev (Estonia)
18 June 2019
18:45

| Bavaria (Germany) | 1–0 | (France) Normandy |
|---|---|---|
| Ekin 1' | Report |

Städtisches Stadion, Kelheim
Referee: Eitan Shmuelevitz (Israel)

20 June 2019
13:00

| Istanbul (Turkey) | 2–1 | (France) Normandy |
|---|---|---|
| Auzou 43' (o.g.); Güner 80' | Report | Sahloune 33' |

Stadion Hankofen, Leiblfing
Referee: Sebastian Colţescu (Romania)
20 June 2019
14:30

| Bavaria (Germany) | 1–1 | West Slovakia |
|---|---|---|
| Ekin 48' | Report | Krčula 62' |

Hammerbachstadion, Landshut
Referee: Sergei Tsinkevich (Belarus)

23 June 2019
10:30

| Istanbul (Turkey) | 0–1 | (Germany) Bavaria |
|---|---|---|
| | Report | Koudossou 90+2' |

Hammerbachstadion, Landshut
Referee: Georgi Vadachkoria (Georgia)
23 June 2019
10:30

| Normandy (France) | 2–0 | West Slovakia |
|---|---|---|
| Sahloune 54'; Flucher 68' | Report |

Anton-Treffer-Stadion, Neustadt an der Donau
Referee: Neil Doyle (Ireland)

==== Group B ====
| Pos | Team | Pld | W | D | L | GF | GA | GD | Pts | Qualification |
|---|---|---|---|---|---|---|---|---|---|---|
| 1 | (Poland) Lower Silesia | 3 | 1 | 2 | 0 | 4 | 3 | +1 | 5 | Final |
| 2 | (Spain) Castile and León | 3 | 1 | 1 | 1 | 5 | 3 | +2 | 4 (Note: Head-to-head result: Hradec Králové Region 0–3 Castile and León.) | Bronze medal |
| 3 | (Czech Republic) Hradec Králové Region | 3 | 1 | 1 | 1 | 3 | 5 | −2 | 4 | |
| 4 | (Russia) Southern Region – SFedU | 3 | 1 | 0 | 2 | 2 | 3 | −1 | 3 | |

Source: UEFA
Rules for classification: Tiebreakers
Notes:
18 June 2019
14:00

| Hradec Králové Region (Czech Republic) | 0–3 | (Spain) Castile and León |
|---|---|---|
| | Report | García Puente 12'; Amor García 43'; Rodríguez Álvarez 73' |

Anton-Treffer-Stadion, Neustadt an der Donau
Referee: Georgi Vadachkoria (Georgia)
18 June 2019
18:45

| Southern Region – SFedU (Russia) | 0–1 | (Poland) Lower Silesia |
|---|---|---|
| | Report | Jaros 60' |

Anton-Treffer-Stadion, Neustadt an der Donau
Referee: Neil Doyle (Ireland)

20 June 2019
16:00

| Hradec Králové Region (Czech Republic) | 1–0 | (Russia) Southern Region – SFedU |
|---|---|---|
| Kabeláč 67' | Report |

Städtisches Stadion, Kelheim
Referee: Eitan Shmuelevitz (Israel)
20 June 2019
18:00

| Lower Silesia (Poland) | 1–1 | (Spain) Castile and León |
|---|---|---|
| Slonecki 90+5' | Report | Juanan 18' |

Stadion Hankofen, Leiblfing
Referee: Roomer Tarajev (Estonia)

23 June 2019
17:30

| Lower Silesia (Poland) | 2–2 | (Czech Republic) Hradec Králové Region |
|---|---|---|
| Niewiadomski 48'; Traczyk 64' | Report | Petřík 50'; Pražák 90+5' |

Anton-Treffer-Stadion, Neustadt an der Donau
Referee: Sergei Tsinkevich (Belarus)
23 June 2019
17:30

| Castile and León (Spain) | 1–2 | (Russia) Southern Region – SFedU |
|---|---|---|
| Dani Burgos 40' | Report | Lednev 30'; Devadze 88' |

Stadion Hankofen, Leiblfing
Referee: Sebastian Colţescu (Romania)

=== Final ===
In the final, extra time and penalty shoot-out are used to decide the winner if necessary.

26 June 2019
18:30

| Bavaria (Germany) | 2–3 | (Poland) Lower Silesia |
|---|---|---|
| Türk 35' (pen.); Ekin 90' (pen.) | Report | Jaros 41'; Traczyk 47' (pen.); Bohdanowicz 80' (pen.) |

Wacker-Arena, Burghausen
Referee: Sebastian Colţescu (Romania)

== Top goalscorers ==
- Preliminary round: There were 71 goals scored in 18 matches, for an average of 3.94 goals per match.
- Intermediate round: There were 186 goals scored in 48 matches, for an average of 3.88 goals per match.
- Final tournament: There were 32 goals scored in 13 matches, for an average of 2.46 goals per match.

— Team eliminated / inactive for this stage.

| Rank | Player | Team | PR | IR | FT | Total |
|---|---|---|---|---|---|---|
| 1 | Aretas Gėgžna | (Lithuania) Nevėžis | 6 | 1 | — | 7 |
| 2 | Vilius Giedraitis | (Lithuania) Nevėžis | 6 | 0 | — | 6 |
| 2 | Željko Štulec | (Croatia) Zagreb | — | 6 | — | 6 |
| 2 | Thomas Vauvy | (France) Normandy | — | 6 | 0 | 6 |
| 5 | Christopher Colvin-Owen | South Wales | 5 | 0 | — | 5 |
| 5 | Gabriel Mihaescu | (Romania) Buzău County | 2 | 3 | — | 5 |
| 5 | Yunus Topal | (Turkey) Istanbul | — | 3 | 2 | 5 |
| 8 | Marko Blagojević | (Bosnia and Herzegovina) East Sarajevo | — | 4 | — | 4 |
| 8 | Gentian Bunjaku | (Switzerland) Vaud | — | 4 | — | 4 |
| 8 | Caner Güner | (Turkey) Istanbul | — | 3 | 1 | 4 |
| 8 | Stive Mendy | (France) Normandy | — | 4 | 0 | 4 |
| 8 | Christopher Quick | South Wales | 2 | 2 | — | 4 |
| 8 | Maxime Roynel | (France) Normandy | — | 4 | 0 | 4 |
| 8 | Abdejalil Sahloune | (France) Normandy | — | 2 | 2 | 4 |
| 8 | Kornel Traczyk | (Poland) Lower Silesia | — | 2 | 2 | 4 |

Source: UEFA.com
