= Hailing =

Hailing may refer to:

- Hail, a form of frozen precipitation
- Hailing District (海陵区), Taizhou, Jiangsu, China
- Hailing Island (海陵岛)
  - Hailing, Yangjiang (海陵镇), town in Jiangcheng District, Yangjiang, Guangdong, China
- Prince of Hailing (disambiguation), several Chinese princes
- Hailing, a municipal part of Leiblfing, Bavaria, Germany
