= Gozo representative football team =

Men's association football team representing Gozo

Gozo
- Nickname: Tat-Tlett Għoljiet
- Association: Gozo Football Association (Assoċjazzjoni tal-Futbol Għawdxija)
- Confederation: ConIFA
- Home stadium: Gozo Stadium
- FIFA code: GOZ
First colours	Second colours	Third colours

The Gozo representative football team (Maltese: It-tim rappreżentattiv Għawdxi tal-futbol) represents the island of Gozo, Malta, in football. It is organised by the Gozo Football Association and its home stadium is the Gozo Stadium.

It is not affiliated with FIFA or UEFA and therefore is not eligible to enter either the World Cup or the European Championship. The Gozo representative football team has however played a number of Non-FIFA international football matches featuring players who are considered as 'Gozitans' for matches of the Gozo Football League, including appearances at Island Games and, by virtue of Gozo's membership of the N.F.-Board in the past, two appearances at the now-defunct Viva World Cup, with one being as hosts. In December 2024, Gozo became a member of the Confederation of Independent Football Associations.

Moreover, as of 2024, Gozo has also participated in 6 editions of UEFA Regions' Cup as Malta's representative, with their debut appearance coming in the inaugural edition in 1999.

Over the years, a Gozo XI has also played friendlies against football clubs; particularly those from the mainland, fielding players playing in the Gozo Football League and, occasionally, Gozitans playing in Malta.

== History ==
Historical records suggest that a team representing the island of Gozo had already played two matches long before the turn of the millennium. Indeed, during the 1970s a side representing Gozo was invited to join in Malta's Independence celebrations and play two friendly matches against local sides. Other historical records indicate that a Gozitan team might have played more matches before that period. Indeed, the first ever match for a Gozitan representative team came in January 1937, where a Gozo XI faced Tarxien Rainbows in a friendly match played at the then Silver Jubilee Stadium.

For a period, a Gozitan representative team also played in the Maltese FA Trophy, but the Gozo Football Association's decision to organise Gozo F.C. and have it play in the Maltese football league system, eventually led to a lengthy hiatus of the Gozo representative team. Indeed, the next known Gozitan appearance came in 1999, when a selection representing Gozo played in the first edition of the UEFA Regions Cup. Ten years later, in 2009, the Gozo representative football team debuted in the Viva World Cup by playing in the 2009 Viva World Cup. In the following year, Gozo hosted the 2010 edition of the Viva World Cup and therefore, once again, Gozo had the opportunity to participate in that Cup. Overall, Gozo's performance was disappointing as they finished at the bottom of their group but the team could find solace in their win against Provence, their first ever win on the field against international opponents. Gozo's appearance in the 2010 Viva World Cup was, however, their last appearance in the now-defunct competition.

The launch of the Gozo Cup during the same year presented an opportunity for the representative side to play friendly matches against Maltese football clubs. The Gozo Cup ran for four consecutive years, and during that period the Gozo representative also played a number of friendlies, including their 17–1 victory against the Raetia national football team in Xewkija.

Since then, Gozo's appearances primarily came at the UEFA Regions' Cup. Indeed, the Gozitan representative football team appearance in the 2017 edition of the bi-annual UEFA Regions Cup marked Gozo's participation in, and hosting of, the tournament for the third edition running. They also participated in the subsequent edition, the 2019 edition.

In 2022 Gozo joined the Island Games Association and this made the Gozo representative football team eligible to participate in the biannual multi-sport event's football tournament. This marked Gozo's return to the international fuora following a hiatus of over a decade. In 2024, it was announced that the Gozitan representative football team will participating in both men's and women's football competitions in the 2025 Island Games.

== Non-FIFA international football ==
International Football - Men
- Head coach: Shaun Bajada
- Most caps: Milos Stojanovic (9)
- Top scorer: John Camilleri (5)

First international
- Provence 3–1 Gozo (Novara, Italy; 22 June 2009)

Biggest win
- Gozo 17–1 Raetia (Xewkija, Malta; 14 January 2012)

Biggest defeat
- (Sápmi) Sapmi 7–2 Gozo (Brescia, Italy; 24 June 2009); Gozo 0–5 Occitania (Xewkija, Gozo; 2 June 2010

VIVA World Cup
- Appearances: 2 (first in 2009)
- Best result: 5th place (2009 & 2010)

Island Games
- Appearances: 2 (first in 2023)
- Best result: 6th place (2023)

=== Tournament records ===
==== At VIVA World Cup ====
Year	Position	GP	W	D	L	GF	GA
(Occitania) 2006	did not enter						
(Sápmi) 2008	did not enter						
(Padania) 2009	5th	3	1	0	2	5	10
(Gozo) 2010	5th	3	1	0	2	3	8
(Kurdistan Region) 2012	did not enter						
Total		6	2	0	4	8	18

==== At Island Games ====
Year	Position	GP	W	D	L	GF	GA
(Guernsey) 2023	6th	4	2	0	2	4	2
(Orkney) 2025	7th	3	0	2	1	3	5

=== Match history ===
22 June 2009 2009 Viva World Cup	Provence	3–1	Gozo	Novara, Italy
17:00 CET	Enais Hammoud 36', 77'; Eddy Hammami 90+1'	Report	John Camilleri 73'	Stadium: Stadio Silvio Piola; Attendance: 100; Referee: Buonanno

24 June 2009 2009 Viva World Cup	Sápmi	7–2	Gozo	Brescia, Italy
17:00 CET	Svein Thomassen 12', 16', 17'; John Eira 48'; Daniel Reginiussen 52', 84'; Espen Bruer 78'	Report	Christian Bugeja 79', 86'	Stadium: Stadio Mario Rigamonti; Attendance: 80; Referee: Baker Seerwand Salman

26 June 2009 2009 Viva World Cup	Occitania	0–2 w/o	Gozo	Brescia, Italy
17:00 CET	Marc Ballue 19'; Julien Cantier 62'	Report	John Camilleri 80'	Stadium: Stadio Mario Rigamonti
Note: After the match Gozo protested with the organization claiming that Occitania affected more substitutions than the number stipulated by the regulations. The protest was upheld and Gozo were awarded a 2-0 victory.

31 May 2010 2010 Viva World Cup	Gozo	1–2	Padania	Xewkija, Gozo
20:15 CET	John Camilleri 40'	Report	Mauro Nannini 7'; Matteo Prandelli 82'	Stadium: Gozo Stadium; Referee: Per Anders Blind (Sweden)

2 June 2010 2010 Viva World Cup	Gozo	0–5	Occitania	Xewkija, Gozo
19:30 CET		Report	Marc Ballue 1' (pen.), 36'; Sebastian Taillan 61'; Jordan Amiel 88'; Guilhem Soro 90+2'	Stadium: Gozo Stadium; Referee: Per Anders Blind (Sweden)

4 June 2010 2010 Viva World Cup	Gozo	2–1	Provence	Xewkija, Gozo
15:30 CET	Rodney Buttigieg 59'; John Camilleri 89'	Report	Stephane Juan 19' (pen.)	Stadium: Gozo Stadium; Referee: Aaron Fenech (Malta)

23 September 2010 2010 Mediterranean Trophy	Two Sicilies	2–1	Gozo	Mercogliano, Italy
	Fabio Sperandeo 15', 25'	Report	John Camilleri 26'	Stadium: Stadio Comunale di Mercogliano; Referee: Fabio Festa

14 January 2012 Friendly	Gozo	17–1	Raetia	Xewkija, Gozo
	Milos Stojanovic 4', 7'; Claudio Antunes 6', 11', 21', 31'; Anthony Portelli 17'; Thiago Melo dos Santos 19'; Michael Bezzina 27'; Christian Debono 38', 84'; Victor Agius 52', 55'; Jeffrey Meilak 60'; Darko Stojanovic 73'; Alex Simoncic 80'; Joseph Grima 88'	Report	Fabio Pocas Martin 71'	Stadium: Gozo Stadium; Referee: Joe Bajada (Gozo)

28 December 2012 2012 Gozo Cup semi-final	Gozo	1–0	Cilento	Xewkija, Gozo
	Milos Stojanovic	Report		Stadium: Gozo Stadium; Referee: Emanuel Grech

30 May 2013 Friendly	Malta	Unknown	Gozo	Ta' Qali, Malta
		Report		Stadium: MFA Training Grounds

9 July 2023 2023 Island Games, Group Stage	Jersey	1–0	Gozo	Saint Sampson, Guernsey
15:30 CET	Solomon 36'	Report		Stadium: The Corbet Field

10 July 2023 2023 Island Games, Group Stage	Gozo	3–0	Saint Helena	Saint Sampson, Guernsey
15:30 CET	Keith Yon 27' (o.g.); Samuel Harland 36'; Jordi Panis 80'	Report		Stadium: The Track

11 July 2023 2023 Island Games, Group Stage	Menorca	0–1	Gozo	Saint Martin, Guernsey
11:30 CET		Report	Jordi Panis 53'	Stadium: Blanche Pierre Lane

13 July 2023 2023 Island Games, 5th place play-off	Guernsey	1–0	Gozo	Saint Martin, Guernsey
15:30 CET	Keene Domaille 52'	Report		Stadium: Blanche Pierre Lane

13 July 2025 2025 Island Games, Group Stage	Gozo	0–0 (4–3 p)	Shetland	Kirkwall, Orkney
16:30 CET		Report		Stadium: KGS 2

14 July 2025 2025 Island Games, Group Stage	Jersey	2–0	Gozo	Holm, Orkney
13:00 CET	Robert Martins-Figueira 24'; Harrison Moon 35'	Report		Stadium: Rockworks Community Playing Fields

17 July 2025 2025 Island Games, 7th place play-off	Gozo	3–3 (3–1 p)	Western Isles	Dounby, Orkney
16:30 CET	Nathan Njoku 4'; Kaio Lucas Nunes Santos 17', 19'	Report	Michael Jones 21'; Ross Macdonald 82'; Stephen Mutch 86'	Stadium: Dounby Community Centre

=== Individual statistics ===
- Players who represented both Malta and Gozo
  - Ferdinando Apap
  - Shaun Bajada
  - Daniel Bogdanovic

== Non-FIFA international football – Women ==
International Football - Women
- Head coach: Franklyn Cassar
- Most caps: Various (5)
- Top scorer: Joeline Camilleri (2)

First international
- Gozo 0–4 Padania (Xewkija, Gozo; 3 June 2010)

Biggest win
- Orkney 0–2 Gozo (Kirkstall, Orkney; 14 July 2025); Gozo 2–0 Frøya (Firth, Orkney; 15 July 2025)

Biggest defeat
- Gozo 0–4 Padania (Xewkija, Gozo; 3 June 2010)

VIVA World Cup
- Appearances: 1 (first in 2010)
- Best result: 2nd place (2010)

Island Games
- Appearances: 1 (first in 2025)
- Best result: 4th place (2025)

=== Tournament records ===
==== At VIVA World Cup ====
Year	Position	GP	W	D	L	GF	GA
(Sápmi) 2008	did not enter						
(Gozo) 2010	2nd	2	0	0	2	0	7

==== At Island Games ====
Year	Position	GP	W	D	L	GF	GA
(Guernsey) 2023	did not enter						
(Orkney) 2025	4th	5	2	1	2	4	6

=== Results ===
3 June 2010 2010 Viva World Cup Final – 1st leg	Gozo	0–4	Padania	Xewkija, Gozo
20:00 CET		Report	Lucrezia Lupi 13'; Martina Baroni 50'; Valentina Colamanco 68'; Lara Laterza 77'	Stadium: Gozo Stadium; Referee: Lawrence Azzopardi (Malta)

5 June 2010 2010 Viva World Cup Final – 2nd leg	Gozo	0–3	Padania	Xewkija, Gozo
16:00 CET		Report	Valentina Povia 10', 40'; Monica Iustioni 78'	Stadium: Gozo Stadium; Referee: Joe Bajada (Gozo)

13 July 2025 2025 Island Games, Group Stage	Isle of Man	0–0 (2–3 p)	Gozo	Dounby, Orkney
20:00 CET		Report		Stadium: Dounby Community Centre

14 July 2025 2025 Island Games, Group Stage	Orkney	0–2	Gozo	Kirkstall, Orkney
20:00 CET		Report	Joeline Camilleri 17'; Ana Mercieca 39'	Stadium: KGS 1

15 July 2025 2025 Island Games, Group Stage	Gozo	2–0	Frøya	Firth, Orkney
16:30 CET	Joeline Camilleri 30'; Georgiana Mifsud 75'	Report		Stadium: Firth Primary School

17 July 2025 2025 Island Games, Semi Final	Bermuda	3–0	Gozo	Kirkwall, Orkney
13:00 CET	Jaden Masters 56'; Emily Cabral 78'; Symira Lowe-Darrell 90'	Report	Shakira Bugeja (red card) 20'	Stadium: KGS 2

18 July 2025 2025 Island Games, Bronze Medal Game	Western Isles	3–0	Gozo	Kirkwall, Orkney
12:00 CET		Report		Stadium: KGS 2

=== Individual statistics ===
- Players who represented both Malta and Gozo
  - Emma Xuereb

== UEFA Regions Cup ==
Regions' Cup Team
- Confederation: UEFA
- Most caps: Michael Bezzina (10)
- Top scorer: Michael Bezzina; Andrew Mizzi; Claudio Antunes Pavlidis (2)

First international
- Provence 3–1 Gozo (Novara, Italy; 22 June 2009)

Biggest win
- Gozo 2–0 Vaasa (Xewkija, Gozo, Malta; 1 October 2014)

Biggest defeat
- (Macedonia (Greece)) Macedonia 8–2 Gozo (Thessaloniki, Greece; 24 June 1999) (Israel) Ironi Tiberias 6–0 Gozo (Thessaloniki, Greece; 22 June 1999); Gozo 0–6 Moscow Oblast (Xewkija, Gozo; 16 October 2012); Bavaria 6–0 Gozo (Leiblfing, Bavaria; 30 September 2018)

UEFA Regions' Cup
- Appearances: 6 (first in 1999)
- Best result: Intermediary Round (2013)

=== Tournament History ===
Year	Position	GP	W	D	L	GF	GA
(Italy) 1999	Preliminary	3	0	0	3	2	18
(Czech Republic) 2001	did not enter						
(Germany) 2003	did not enter						
(Poland) 2005	did not enter						
(Bulgaria) 2007	did not enter						
(Croatia) 2009	did not enter						
(Portugal) 2011	did not enter						
(Italy) 2013	Intermediary	3	1	1	1	5	10
(Republic of Ireland) 2015	Intermediary	3	1	0	2	4	5
(Turkey) 2017	Intermediary	3	0	1	2	1	8
(Germany) 2019	Intermediary	3	0	0	3	1	13
NA 2021	was not held due to the COVID-19 pandemic						
(Spain) 2023	did not enter						
(San Marino) 2025	Intermediary	3	0	0	3	0	7
Total		18	2	2	14	13	61

=== Results ===
21 June 1999 1999 UEFA Regions' Cup, Preliminary Round	Zapadne Srbije (Federal Republic of Yugoslavia)	4–0	Gozo	Thessaloniki, Greece
	Sobotovic 26', 39', 52'; Andric 60'	Report		Stadium: Toumba Stadium

22 June 1999 1999 UEFA Regions' Cup, Preliminary Round	Israel Amateur	6–0	Gozo	Thessaloniki, Greece
	Dabush 8'; Ben-ezra 13', 38'; 55' (o.g.); Haluani 83'; Maman 88'	Report		Stadium: Toumba Stadium

24 June 1999 1999 UEFA Regions' Cup, Preliminary Round	Macedonia (Macedonia (Greece))	8–2	Gozo	Thessaloniki, Greece
	Petrousis 4', 62'; Golias 44', 50', 73'; Panapolous 58'; Thomasiades 68'; Geragotis 75'	Report	Farrugia 15'; Lautier 31' (pen.)	Stadium: Toumba Stadium

14 October 2012 2013 UEFA Regions' Cup, Intermediary Round	Gozo	3–2	(Latvia) FK Rīnūži-Strong	Xewkija, Gozo
11:30 CET	Bezzina 49'; Mercieca 54'; Portelli 78'	Report	Puzirevskis 39'; Simanovskis 88'	Stadium: Gozo Stadium; Referee: Damir Batinić (Croatia)

16 October 2012 2013 UEFA Regions' Cup, Intermediary Round	Gozo	0–6	(Moscow Oblast) Olimp Moscow Region	Xewkija, Gozo
11:30 CET		Report	Orlov 27', 41', 56'; Asadov 34', 86'; Korobetc 83'	Stadium: Gozo Stadium; Referee: Richard Trutz (Slovakia)

18 October 2012 2013 UEFA Regions' Cup, Intermediary Round	Gozo	2–2	Ialoveni	Xewkija, Gozo
11:30 CET	Stojanovic 59'; Camilleri 63'	Report	Spinu 24'; Tonu 74'	Stadium: Gozo Stadium; Referee: Richard Trutz (Slovakia)

1 October 2014 2015 UEFA Regions' Cup, Intermediary Round	Gozo	2–0	Vaasa	Xewkija, Gozo
19:30 CET	Thiago Melo 67'; Bezzina 84'	Report		Stadium: Gozo Stadium; Referee: Nikola Popov (Bulgaria)

3 October 2014 2015 UEFA Regions' Cup, Intermediary Round	Gozo	1–2	Pinsk	Xewkija, Gozo
16:30 CET	Pavlidis 72'	Report	Muzaffer İlhan 24'; Nuri Kunduz 74'	Stadium: Gozo Stadium; Referee: Mitja Žganec (Slovenia)

5 October 2014 2015 UEFA Regions' Cup, Intermediary Round	Gozo	1–3	South Region – Russia	Xewkija, Gozo
16:30 CET	Pavlidis 10'	Report	Mochkarski 21'; Valiulin 22'; Obernibesov 80'	Stadium: Gozo Stadium; Referee: Nikola Popov (Bulgaria)

5 October 2016 2017 UEFA Regions' Cup, Intermediary Round	Gozo	0–5	East West Central Scotland	Xewkija, Gozo
16:30 CET		Report	Heaver 12' (pen.); Moore 56', 87'; Butler 77'; McClure 87'	Stadium: Gozo Stadium; Referee: Sascha Amhof (Switzerland)

7 October 2016 2017 UEFA Regions' Cup, Intermediary Round	Gozo	0–0	Ligue Paris Ile-de-France	Xewkija, Gozo
13:00 CET		Report		Stadium: Gozo Stadium; Referee: Georgi Vadachkoria (Georgia)

9 October 2016 2017 UEFA Regions' Cup, Intermediary Round	Gozo	1–3	(Ukraine) FC Inhulets	Xewkija, Gozo
15:00 CET	Mizzi 10'	Report	Bozhenko 20'; Horshchynskyi 62'; Sorokyn 90' (pen.)	Stadium: Gozo Stadium; Referee: Georgi Vadachkoria (Georgia)

27 September 2018 2019 UEFA Regions' Cup, Intermediary Round	Gozo	0–4	Vojvodina	Neustadt an der Donau, Bavaria
17:00 CET		Report	Hađinac 13'; Grima 25' (o.g.); Šavija 58'; Papović 85'	Stadium: Neustadt Stadium; Referee: Roomer Tarajev

30 September 2018 2019 UEFA Regions' Cup, Intermediary Round	Bavaria	6–0	Gozo	Leiblfing, Bavaria
17:00 CET	Marx 26'; Fromholzer 50'; Gebhart 55'; Fischer 60'; Nagengast 81'; Bauer 86' (pen.)	Report		Stadium: Leiblfing Stadium; Referee: Luca Barbeno

3 October 2018 2019 UEFA Regions' Cup, Intermediary Round	Ironi Tiberias (Israel)	3–1	Gozo	Neustadt an der Donau, Bavaria
14:00 CET	Zadok Haker 10'; Yada'N 80'; Cohen 90'	Report	Mizzi 65'	Stadium: Neustadt Stadium; Referee: Luca Barbeno

17 September 2024 2025 UEFA Regions' Cup, Intermediary Round	Rijeka	3–0	Gozo	Sestri Levante, Italy
17:00 CET	Matković 9'; Prizmić 34'; Ivetić 76'	Report		Stadium: Stadio Giuseppe Sivori; Referee: Iwan Arwel Griffith (Wales)

20 September 2024 2025 UEFA Regions' Cup, Intermediary Round	Liguria	1–0	Gozo	Sestri Levante, Italy
17:00 CET	Damonte 47'	Report		Stadium: Stadio Giuseppe Sivori; Referee: Miloš Savović (Montenegro)

23 September 2024 2025 UEFA Regions' Cup, Intermediary Round	Gozo	0–3	Romania Amateur	Sestri Levante, Italy
17:00 CET		Report	Gaiceanu 7'; Bedo 82'; Voiniciuc 90+3'	Stadium: Stadio Giuseppe Sivori; Referee: Iwan Arwel Griffith (Wales)

== Gozo XI - Selected non-international matches ==
=== FA Trophy ===
7 May 1978 Preliminary Round; 1977-78	St. George's (Malta)	2–1	Gozo	Gżira, Malta
			Eddie Vella 9'	Stadium: Empire Stadium

6 May 1979 Quarter-Final; 1978-79	Msida Saint-Joseph (Malta)	1–2	Gozo	Gżira, Malta
				Stadium: Empire Stadium; Referee: Anthony Willoughby

14 May 1979 Semi-Final; 1978-79	Floriana (Malta)	2–1	Gozo	Gżira, Malta
				Stadium: Empire Stadium; Referee: Tommy Restall

24 March 1983 Preliminary Round; 1982-83	Gżira United (Malta)	2–1	Gozo	Marsa, Malta
				Stadium: Marsa Stadium; Referee: Austin Pugliesvich

12 February 1984 Preliminary Round; 1983-84	Marsa (Malta)	2–1	Gozo	Ta' Qali, Malta
				Stadium: National Stadium, Ta' Qali; Referee: John Gulia

21 February 1985 Preliminary Round; 1984-85	Mqabba Hajduks (Malta)	3–1	Gozo	Marsa, Malta
				Stadium: Marsa Stadium; Referee: Charles Tabone

19 February 1986 Preliminary Round; 1985-86	Tarxien Rainbows (Malta)	4–0	Gozo	Marsa, Malta
				Stadium: Marsa Stadium; Referee: Patrick Fenech

25 February 1987 Preliminary Round; 1986-87	Birkirkara (Malta)	3–0	Gozo	Ta' Qali, Malta
				Stadium: National Stadium, Ta' Qali; Referee: Charles Ebejer

27 March 1988 Preliminary Round; 1987-88	Gozo	1–0	(Malta) Mqabba Hajduks	Xewkija, Gozo
				Stadium: Silver Jubilee Stadium; Referee: Victor Mintoff

3 April 1988 Second Round; 1987-88	Hibernians (Malta)	6–1	Gozo	Ta' Qali, Malta
				Stadium: National Stadium, Ta' Qali; Referee: Salvu Lanzon

22 February 1989 Preliminary Round; 1988-89	Lija Athletic (Malta)	1–2	Gozo	Paola, Malta
				Stadium: Pace Grasso Stadium; Referee: Joseph Cassar

1 April 1989 Second Round; 1988-89	Rabat Ajax (Malta)	7–0	Gozo	Ta' Qali, Malta
				Stadium: National Stadium, Ta' Qali; Referee: Joseph Cassar

14 February 1990 Preliminary Round; 1989-90	Gudja United (Malta)	1–0	Gozo	Ta' Qali, Malta
	Baldacchino 15'			Stadium: National Stadium, Ta' Qali

Preliminary Round; 1990-91	Zebbug Rangers (Malta)	2–3	Gozo
	J Barbara 38'; Gino Hili 45'		Victor Caruana 31', 65' (pen.), 83' (pen.)

Second Round; 1990-91	Floriana (Malta)	3–1	Gozo
	M Buttigieg 49' (o.g.); Tarhouni 65'; David Brincat		Ray Gafa 22'

=== Friendlies and tournaments ===
January 1937 Friendly	Gozo	1–2	(Malta) Tarxien Rainbows	Xewkija, Gozo
				Stadium: Silver Jubilee Stadium

February 1941 Friendly	Gozo	1–5	(Malta) Sliema Wanderers	Xewkija, Gozo
				Stadium: Silver Jubilee Stadium

April 1949 Friendly	Gozo	2–1	Malta Signals Unit XI	Xewkija, Gozo
				Stadium: Silver Jubilee Stadium

25 September 1949 Friendly	Gozo	3–5	(Malta) Luqa St. Andrew's	Xewkija, Gozo
	Gauci 50', 56', 80'		Scicluna 7', 32'; Psaila 35', 75'; Calleja 55'	Stadium: Silver Jubilee Stadium

30 May 1957 Friendly	Gozo	3–7	(Malta) Hamrun Spartans	Xewkija, Gozo
				Stadium: Silver Jubilee Stadium

19 January 1958 Friendly	Gozo	1–4	(Malta) Hibernians	Xewkija, Gozo
				Stadium: Silver Jubilee Stadium

22 November 1970 Friendly	Gozo	2–3	(Malta) Sliema Wanderers	Xewkija, Gozo
				Stadium: Silver Jubilee Stadium

12 April 1977 Friendly	Asswehly SC (Libya)	2–1	Gozo	Misurata, Libya

14 April 1977 Friendly	Misurata XI (Libya)	0–3	Gozo	Misurata, Libya

9 January 1983 Friendly	Gozo	1–1	(Malta) Sliema Wanderers	Xewkija, Gozo
				Stadium: Silver Jubilee Stadium

30 January 1983 Friendly	Gozo	1–0	(Malta) Floriana	Xewkija, Gozo
	Frank Muscat 40'			Stadium: Silver Jubilee Stadium

24 March 1985 Friendly	Gozo	0–1	(Malta) Zurrieq	Xewkija, Gozo
				Stadium: Silver Jubilee Stadium

May 1997 Friendly	Gozo	4–3	Malta XI	Xewkija, Gozo
	Mario Bonello 35'; Mark Buttigieg 40'; Sabri Rais 46'; Benneth Njoku		Noel Turner 1'; Carmel Busuttil 48'; Stefan Sultana 85'	Stadium: Gozo Stadium; Referee: Reno Refalo

30 January 2010 Friendly	Gozo	1–8	(Hungary) Ferencváros	Xewkija, Gozo
				Stadium: Gozo Stadium

19 February 2010 2010 Gozo Cup; Semi-final	Gozo	1–2	(Malta) Hibernians	Xewkija, Gozo
		Report		Stadium: Gozo Stadium

21 February 2010 2010 Gozo Cup; 3/4ths place	Gozo	2–3	(Malta) Valletta	Xewkija, Gozo
		Report		Stadium: Gozo Stadium

23 September 2010 2010 Mediterranean Trophy	S.C. Castellana (Italy)	0–4	Gozo	Mercogliano, Italy
		Report	Manwel Cordina 12'; Kenneth Mercieca 28'; Anthony Portelli 36' (pen.); Rodney Buttigieg 90'	Stadium: Stadio Comunale di Mercogliano; Referee: Joe Bajada

25 March 2011 2011 Gozo Cup; Group A	Gozo	0–1	(Malta) Valletta	Xewkija, Gozo
		Report	Denni 39'	Stadium: Gozo Stadium; Referee: Trustin Farrugia Cann

25 March 2011 2011 Gozo Cup; Group A	Gozo	0–3	(Malta) Hibernians	Xewkija, Gozo
		Report	Matt Clarke 16'; Winston Cosenza 30'; Paul McManus 34'	Stadium: Gozo Stadium; Referee: Fyodor Zammit

27 March 2011 2011 Gozo Cup; 5/6ths place	Gozo	4–1	(Malta) Qormi	Xewkija, Gozo
	Thiago Dos Santos 9', 25'; Claudio Antunes 18', 72'	Report	Josue Souza Santos 10'	Stadium: Gozo Stadium; Referee: Andre Arciola

30 December 2012 2012 Gozo Cup; Final	Gozo	2–2 (5-6 p)	(Malta) Valletta	Xewkija, Gozo
	Kalin Ganchev 9'; Milos Stojanovic 54'	Report	Jason Vandelannoite 11'; Demba Touré 39'	Stadium: Gozo Stadium

15 November 2013 2013 Gozo Cup; Semi-final	Gozo	0–1	(Malta) Sliema Wanderers	Xewkija, Gozo
		Report	Axl Xeureb 4'	Stadium: Gozo Stadium

17 November 2013 2013 Gozo Cup; 3/4ths place	Gozo	3–1	(Malta) Hibernians	Xewkija, Gozo
	Saturday Nanapere 72'; Dunstan Vella (o.g.); Sunday Baala 77'	Report	Obinna Obiefule 27'	Stadium: Gozo Stadium
