= Lower Silesian Football Association =

Provincial football association in Poland

UEFA
- Short name: DZPN
- Headquarters: ul. Oporowska 62
- Location: 53-434 Wrocław
- UEFA affiliation: PZPN
- General Secretary: Łukasz Czajkowski
- Website: dolzpn.pl

The Lower Silesian Football Association (Polish: Dolnośląski Związek Piłki Nożnej (DZPN)) is one of sixteen provincial football associations, part of the Polish Football Association. The association is headquartered in Wrocław and manages football competitions in the Lower Silesian province at all levels.

== Participation in the UEFA Regions’ Cup ==
The union's representative has successfully managed to win the 2007 and 2019 UEFA Regions' Cup. As the defending champion, they attempted to maintain their status by representing Poland in the 2023 UEFA Regions' Cup. With two defeats and one draw in the group, they came through in last place, with Galicia winning the title at the expense of Lower Silesia. In 2025, they reached the final of the tournament, losing 0–1 after extra time to Aragon.
