= North Macedonia national amateur football team =

National amateur football team

North Macedonia
- Confederation: UEFA
- Head coach: Zanko Savov
- Captain: Niki Zumrovski
- Most caps: Many players (6)
- Top scorer: David Spasov, Mirchevski (2)
- Home stadium: (none)

First international
- (North Macedonia) Amateurs Macedonia 0-1 Euboea (Greece) (Cardiff, Wales, 4 June 2018)

Biggest win
- South Wales Football Association 1-2 Amateurs Macedonia (North Macedonia) (Barry, Wales, 7 June 2018) (Sweden) Serbiska KoIF Kozara 0-1 Amateurs Macedonia (North Macedonia) (Cardiff, Wales, 10 June 2018)

Biggest defeat
- (Russia) Southern Federal University 4-0 Amateurs Macedonia (North Macedonia) (Coleraine, Northern Ireland, 18 October 2018)

Regions' Cup
- Appearances: 3 (first in 2019)
- Best result: Intermediate round (2019, 2023, 2025)

The North Macedonia national amateur football team represents North Macedonia in the UEFA Regions' Cup in men's international football, and is controlled by the Football Federation of Macedonia, the governing body for football in North Macedonia. As of the 2025 edition, the players are known to be picked from the Macedonian Second Football League, the tier 2 in the North Macedonia league system.

The team started play in its current form in 2018 as Amateurs Macedonia. They started in the preliminary round in the 2019 edition where they got 2 wins against Serbiska KoIF Kozara from Sweden and the South Wales Football Association from Wales to make it to the intermediate round. From 2023 onwards they've entered directly in the intermediate round. The team has yet to reach the Final 8 main phase of the Regions' Cup, and has yet to win a match in the intermediate round as of the 2025 edition.

North Macedonia has previously been represented by various regional sides, for instance a team representing the Northeastern Statistical Region in the 2017 UEFA Regions' Cup.

== Results and fixtures ==
4 June 2018 2019 UEFA Regions' Cup preliminary	Amateurs Macedonia (North Macedonia)	0–1	(Greece) Euboea	Cyncoed Stadium, Cardiff
16:00 UTC+1		Report	Karantakis 8'	Referee: Alex Troleis (Faroe Islands)

7 June 2018 2019 UEFA Regions' Cup preliminary	South Wales	1–2	(North Macedonia) Amateurs Macedonia	Jenner Park Stadium, Barry
20:00 UTC+1	Quick 89'	Report	Lukarov 57'; Mirchevski 72'	Referee: Veaceslav Banari (Moldova)

10 June 2018 2019 UEFA Regions' Cup preliminary	Kozara (Sweden)	0–1	(North Macedonia) Amateurs Macedonia	Cyncoed Stadium, Cardiff
17:00 UTC+1		Report	Hristov 62'	Referee: Veaceslav Banari (Moldova)

18 October 2018 2019 UEFA Regions' Cup intermediate	Southern Region – SFedU (Russia)	4–0	(North Macedonia) Amateurs Macedonia	The Showgrounds, Coleraine
15:00 UTC+1	Bogdanov 39'; Zbrodov 46'; Nastavshev 64'; Tishchenko 89'	Report		Referee: Eldorjan Hamiti (Albania)

21 October 2018 2019 UEFA Regions' Cup intermediate	Mid-Ulster/County Antrim (Northern Ireland)	1–0	(North Macedonia) Amateurs Macedonia	Windsor Park, Belfast
18:30 UTC+1	Wilson 42'	Report		Referee: Aleksandrs Golubevs (Latvia)

24 October 2018 2019 UEFA Regions' Cup intermediate	Amateurs Macedonia (North Macedonia)	1–2	(Portugal) Braga (region)	Shamrock Park, Portadown
20:30 UTC+1	Mirchevski 80'	Report	Fernandes 39' (pen.); Rego 75'	Referee: Eldorjan Hamiti (Albania)

29 September 2022 2023 UEFA Regions' Cup	Bavaria (Germany)	2–0	North Macedonia	Stadio Comunale Domenico Francioni, Latina
09:00 UTC+2	Winkler 13'; Mayer 24'	Report		Attendance: 20; Referee: Abdulkadir Bitigen (Turkey)

2 October 2022 2023 UEFA Regions' Cup	Lazio (region) (Italy)	1–1	North Macedonia	Aprilia Stadium, Aprilia
09:00 UTC+2	Damiani 90+4'	Report	Andonov 71' (pen.)	Attendance: 84; Referee: Christopher Jaeger (Austria)

5 October 2022 2023 UEFA Regions' Cup	Jersey (England)	0–0	North Macedonia	Aprilia Stadium, Aprilia
09:00 UTC+2		Report		Attendance: 15; Referee: Abdulkadir Bitigen (Turkey)

13 September 2024 2025 UEFA Regions' Cup	FK Vojvodina (Serbia)	2–0	North Macedonia	Serbian FA Sports Center, Stara Pazova
16:00 UTC+2	Barić 80'; Bačvanski 90+2'	Report		Referee: Dragomir Draganov (Bulgaria)

16 September 2024 2025 UEFA Regions' Cup	Western Slovakia	2–1	North Macedonia	Serbian FA Sports Center, Stara Pazova
12:00 UTC+2	Mego 70'; Stovička 78'	Report	Spasov 51'	Referee: Marcel Birsan (Romania)

19 September 2024 2025 UEFA Regions' Cup	North Macedonia	1–2	(Wales) Tim Rhanbarthol y De	Serbian FA Sports Center, Stara Pazova
16:00 UTC+2	Spasov 53'	Report	Bonthron 32'; Eason 85'	Referee: Dragomir Draganov (Bulgaria)

=== Current squad ===
The following players were called up for the 2025 UEFA Regions' Cup matches against FK Vojvodina, Western Slovakia, and Tîm Rhanbarthol y De on 13, 16, and 19 September 2024.

No.	Pos.	Player	Date of birth (age)	Caps	Goals	Club
1	GK	Antonio Stolevski	(22)	{{{caps}}}	0	(Football Federation of Macedonia) {{{club}}}
12	GK	Stefan Bogojevski	(20)	{{{caps}}}	0	(Football Federation of Macedonia) FK Pobeda
2	DF	Matej Mitrevski	(19)	{{{caps}}}	0	(Football Federation of Macedonia) {{{club}}}
3	DF	Kristijan Jordanovski	(26)	{{{caps}}}	0	(Football Federation of Macedonia) {{{club}}}
4	DF	Hristijan Bejkov	(26)	{{{caps}}}	0	(Football Federation of Macedonia) {{{club}}}
5	DF	Hristijan Mitrevski	(27)	{{{caps}}}	0	(Football Federation of Macedonia) KF Bashkimi
6	DF	Hristijan Krklinski	(28)	{{{caps}}}	0	(Football Federation of Macedonia) FK Novaci
13	DF	Vlatko Stojanovski	(21)	{{{caps}}}	0	(Football Federation of Macedonia) {{{club}}}
15	DF	Jovica Radevski	(25)	{{{caps}}}	0	(Football Federation of Macedonia) FK Detonit Plachkovica
8	MF	Kiril Nedelkov	(24)	{{{caps}}}	0	(Football Federation of Macedonia) FK Vardar Negotino
10	MF	Niki Zumrovski (captain)	(32)	{{{caps}}}	0	(Football Federation of Macedonia) FK Vardar Negotino
14	MF	David Debreslioski	(20)	{{{caps}}}	0	(Football Federation of Macedonia) FK Detonit Plachkovica
17	MF	Damjan Angelkovski	(21)	{{{caps}}}	0	(Football Federation of Macedonia) FK Pobeda
7	FW	Nikola Sareski	(20)	{{{caps}}}	0	(Football Federation of Macedonia) FK Kozhuf
9	FW	Angel Kochev	(26)	{{{caps}}}	0	(Football Federation of Macedonia) FK Kozhuf
11	FW	Muharem Mislimi	(25)	{{{caps}}}	0	(Football Federation of Macedonia) KF Bashkimi
16	FW	David Spasov	(19)	{{{caps}}}	2	(Football Federation of Macedonia) FK Vardar Negotino
18	FW	Hebib Saiti	(19)	{{{caps}}}	0	(Football Federation of Macedonia) KF Bashkimi

== Socialist Republic of Macedonia senior football team ==
An amateur team representing the Socialist Republic of Macedonia entered the 1975 intra-Yugoslav "Brotherhood and Unity Tournament", of which very little is known. The one match they are known to have played in that tournament was an 0-1 loss to Kosovo.
