= Dejan Mitrović =

Serbian footballer

Personal information
- Full name: Dejan Mitrović
- Date of birth: February 10, 1973 (age 53)
- Place of birth: Obrenovac, SFR Yugoslavia
- Height: 1.77 m (5 ft 9 1/2 in)
- Position: Midfielder

Youth career
- 1980-1987: Radnički Obrenovac
- 1987-1989: Partizan
- 1989-1991: Radnički Obrenovac

Senior career*
Years	Team	Apps	(Gls)
1991–1992	OFK Beograd		
1992–1994	SK Nijlen		
1994–1998	Cappellen	80	(19)
1998–2000	Westerlo	60	(11)
2000–2003	Mouscron	45	(7)
2003–2004	Anorthosis	5	(0)
2003	Anagennisi Deryneia	13	(1)
2004	União Madeira	15	(2)
2004–2005	Royal Antwerp	33	(4)
2005–2006	KFC Heidebloem Lille		
- * Club domestic league appearances and goals

Dejan Mitrović (Serbian Cyrillic: Дејан Митровић; born February 2, 1973) is a Serbian retired football player.

== Career ==
After playing with OFK Beograd still a youngster, he moved in 1992 to Belgium where he would spend most of his career. After playing initially with minor club Nijlen, he moved in 1994 to Cappellen and played thereafter for several other Belgian clubs such as Belgian First Division clubs Westerlo, Mouscron and later on, with FC Antwerp and lower league KFC Lille. In between, he will also have spells in Cyprus, with Anorthosis and Anagennisi Deryneia, and in Portugal, with União from Madeira.
