= Anton Treffer Stadion =

Stadium in Neustadt an der Donau, Germany

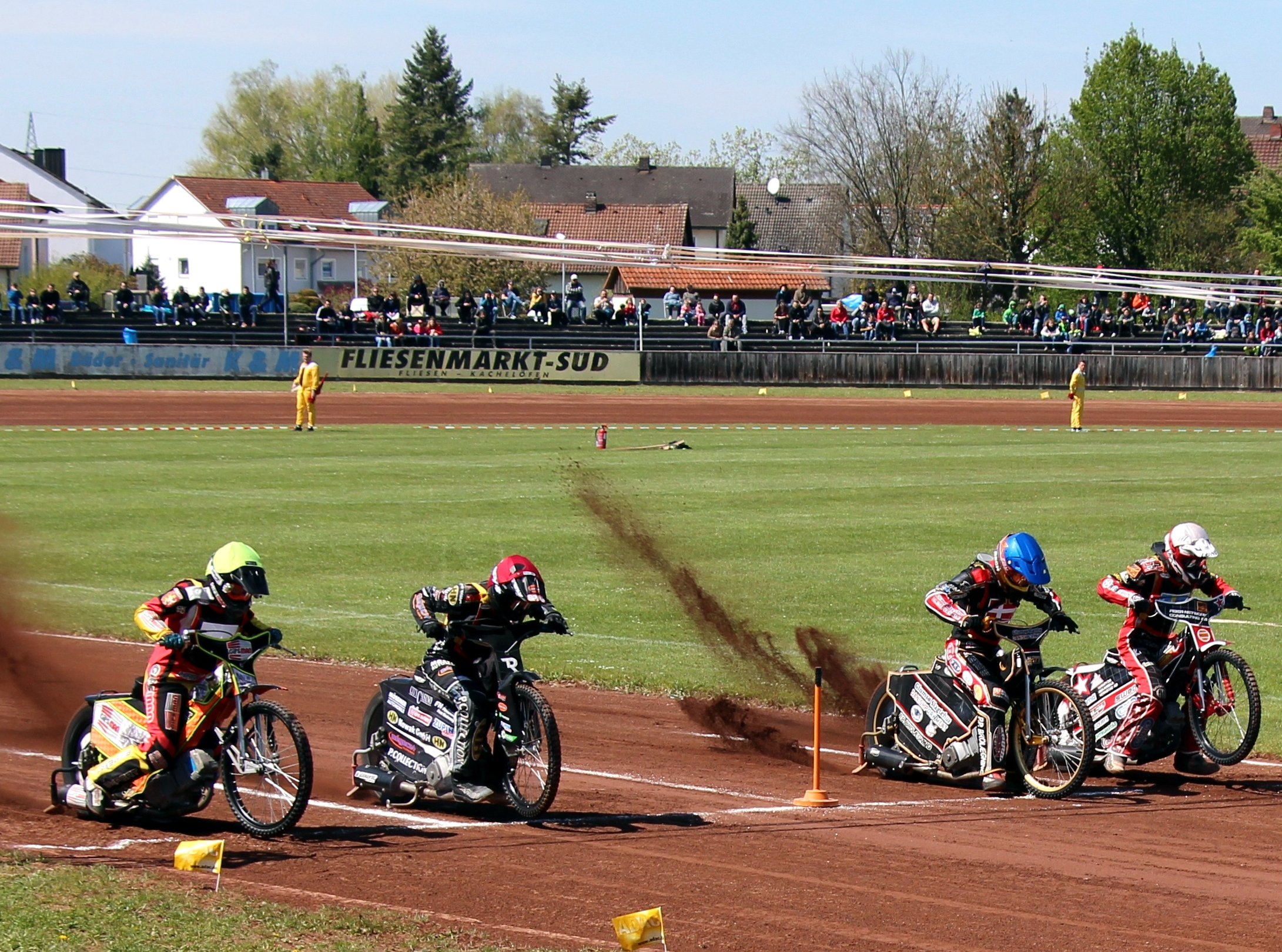
- 2017 race taking place at the stadium
- Location: 93333 Neustadt an der Donau, Germany
- Coordinates: 48°48′41″N 11°46′02″E
- Capacity: 10,000
- Opened: 11 August 1981
- Length: 0.396 km (0.246 mi)

The Anton Treffer Stadion is a multi-purpose stadium in Neustadt an der Donau. It is located on the north side of the town, on the intersection of Am Volksfestpl and Bad Gögginger Str. The stadium is used by the MSC Neustadt speedway team for motorcycle speedway and TSV Neustadt for football.

== History ==
The MSC Neustadt speedway club first organised speedway in the town from 1967 to 1976 at the equestrian club. The track did not meet international regulations, which forced the speedway club to seek alternative premises. A site was found and construction began. On the opening of the stadium on 11 August 1981, almost 15,000 spectators attended.

The stadium was a significant venue for speedway and hosted many important events, including qualifying rounds of the Speedway World Championship (starting in 1983) the Speedway World Pairs Championship in 1984 and a qualifying round of the Speedway World Team Cup in 1985.

In recent years due to noise complaints and legal disputes the stadium only hosts two motorsport events each year.

== MSC Neustadt ==
Th team MSC Neustadt competed in the West German Team Championship from circa.1983 to 1990. They won the team silver in 1985 and again in 1986.

Following the German reunification, the team joined the Speedway Bundesliga/Superliga, until the restrictions on the stadium usage forced the team to fold.
