= Stéphane Gonçalves =

Portuguese footballer

Personal information
- Full name: Stéphane Gomes Gonçalves
- Date of birth: 2 May 1996 (age 30)
- Place of birth: Funchal, Madeira
- Position: Midfielder

Team information
- Current team: Echallens
- Number: 10

Senior career*
Years	Team	Apps	(Gls)
2015–2016	Lausanne-Sport	3	(0)
2016	Stade Lausanne Ouchy		
2017–2018	Vevey Sports		
2018–2019	Azzurri 90 LS	15	(8)
2019–	Echallens	96	(11)
- * Club domestic league appearances and goals as of 1 July 2025

Stéphane Gomes Gonçalves (born 2 May 1996) is a Portuguese footballer who most recently played as a midfielder for Echallens.

== Career ==
On 22 May 2015, Gonçalves made his professional debut with Lausanne-Sport in a 2014–15 Swiss Challenge League match against Le Mont. He left Lausanne-Sport in 2015, going on to play for Stade Lausanne Ouchy, Vevey Sports, Azzurri 90 LS and FC Echallens
