= Stadion imeni Bohdana Markevycha =

Sports stadium in Vynnyky, Ukraine

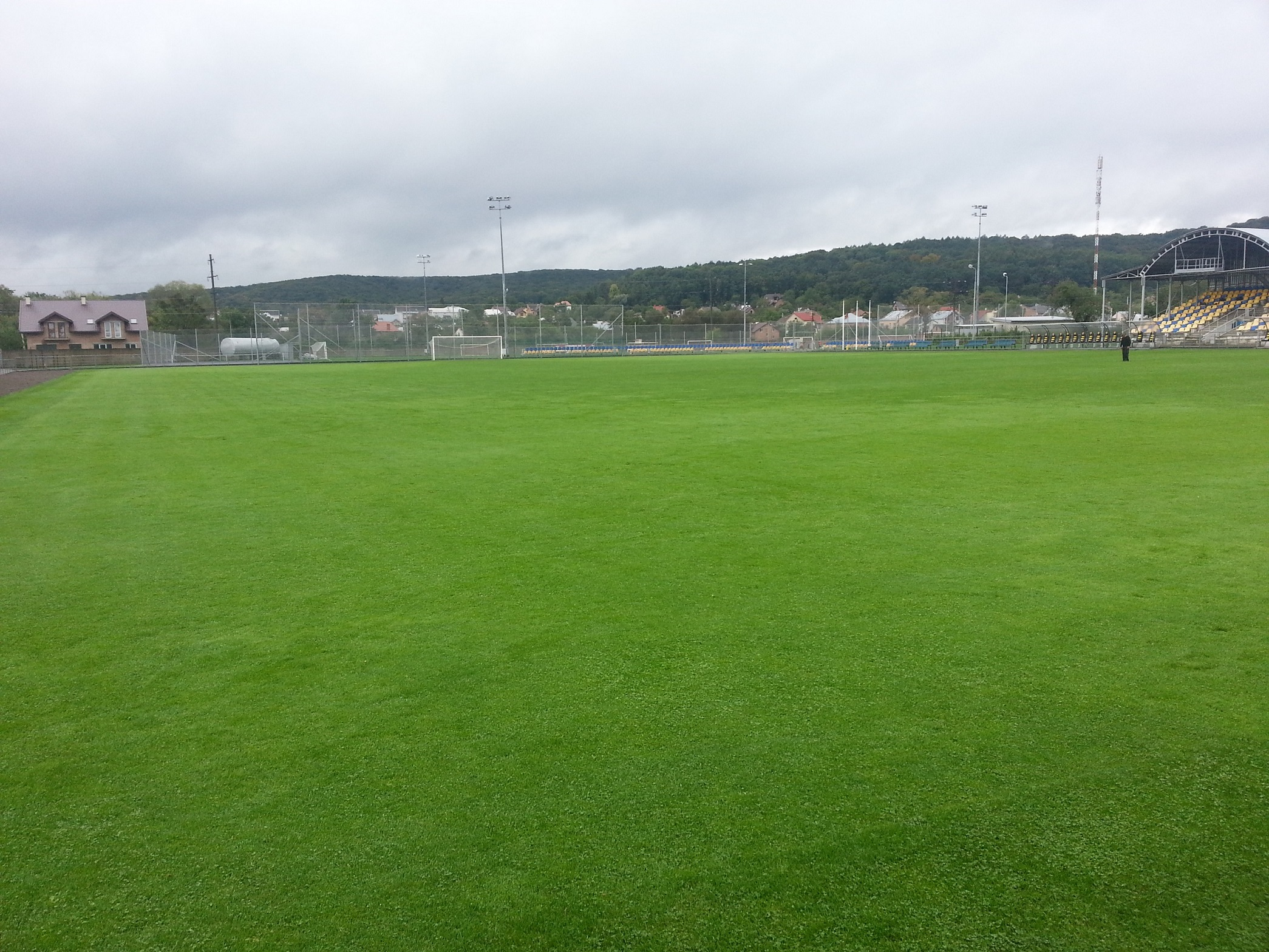
- Interactive map of Stadion imeni Bohdana Markevycha
- Location: vul. Sportova, 2, Vynnyky; Ukraine
- Owner: FC Rukh Vynnyky
- Operator: FC Rukh Vynnyky
- Capacity: 837
- Surface: Grass
- Field size: 105x68 m

Construction
- Built: 1939-1940

The Stadion imeni Bohdana Markevycha (Ukrainian: Стадіон імені Богдана Маркевича, Bohdan Markevych Stadium) is a sports stadium in Vynnyky, Ukraine. It is the home field for FC Rukh Vynnyky. Named after the youth coach Bohdan Markevych.

In honor of Bohdan Markevych (1925–2002) a bronze monument that was supposed to delineate the coach teaching his son Myron football was erected as a tribute and memorial.

The stadium hosted the football representative tournament of the Ukrainian Army.
