= Samuel Pancotti =

Sammarinese footballer (born 2000)

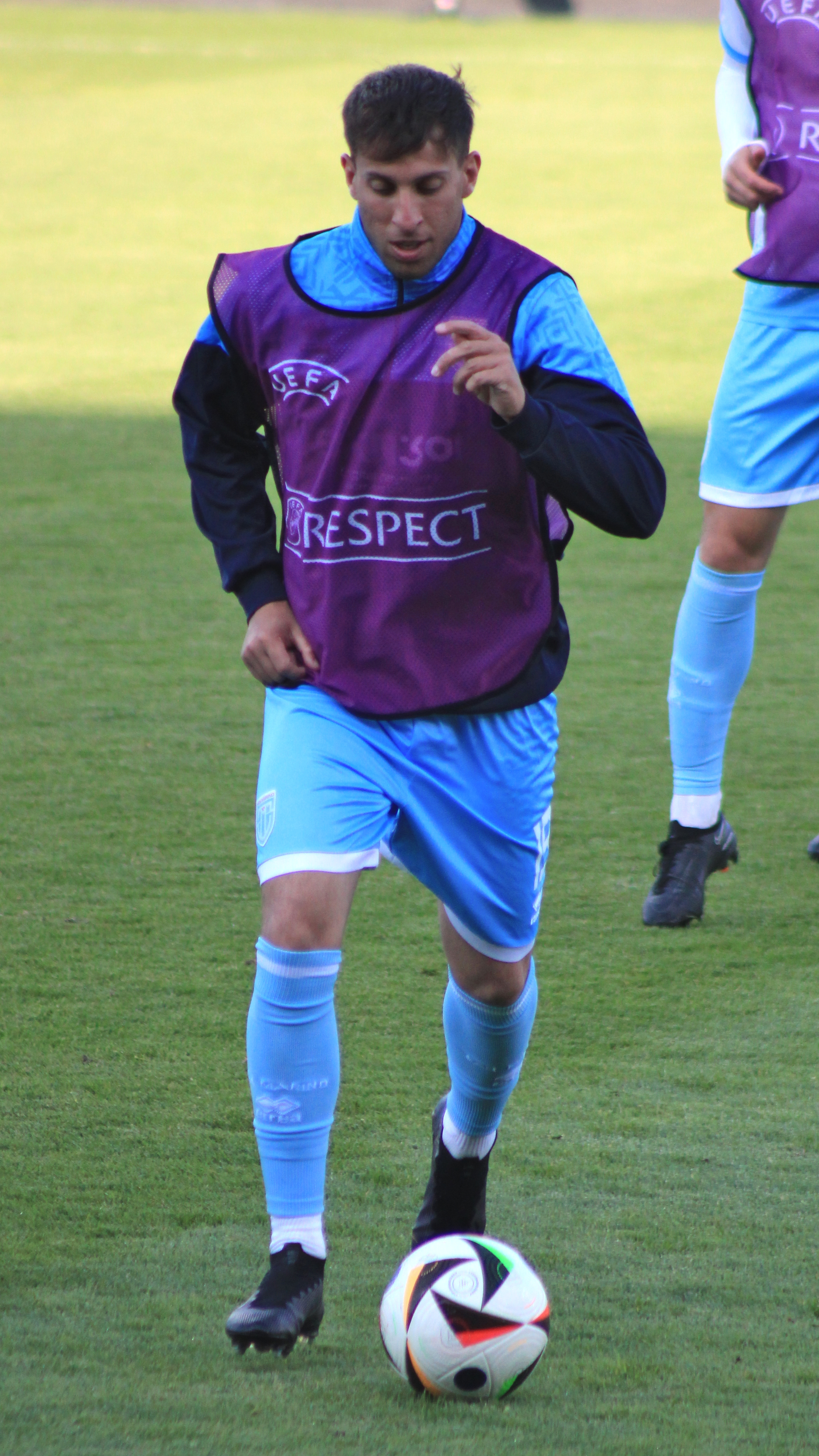
- Pancotti with San Marino against Slovakia (2024)

Personal information
- Full name: Samuel Pancotti
- Date of birth: 31 October 2000 (age 26)
- Place of birth: San Marino
- Position: Forward

Team information
- Current team: Folgore
- Number: 19

Youth career
- –2017: San Marino Academy

Senior career*
Years	Team	Apps	(Gls)
2017–2023	La Fiorita	100	(17)
2023–	Folgore	90	(25)

International career^{‡}
2016	San Marino U17	3	(1)
2018	San Marino U21	3	(0)
2018–2022	San Marino U21	25	(0)
2024–	San Marino Amateur	6	(2)
2022–	San Marino	17	(0)
- * Club domestic league appearances and goals as of 5 June 2026 ‡ National team caps and goals as of 15 November 2026

Samuel Pancotti (born 31 October 2000) is a Sammarinese professional footballer who plays as a forward for Folgore and the San Marino national team.

== Career ==
Pancotti made his international debut for San Marino on 17 November 2022 in a friendly match against Saint Lucia, which finished as a 1–1 away draw.

== Career statistics ==
=== International ===
As of 15 November 2026

San Marino
Year	Apps	Goals
2022	2	0
2023	1	0
2024	4	0
2025	1	0
2026	9	0
Total	17	0
