= Prince of Hailing =

Prince of Hailing may refer to:

- Xiao Zhaowen, demoted emperor of the Southern Qi dynasty
- Wanyan Liang, demoted emperor of the Jurchen Jin dynasty
