= 2007 UEFA Regions' Cup =

UEFA Regions' Cup Bulgaria 2007

Tournament details
- Host country: Bulgaria
- Dates: 20 June – 26 June
- Teams: 8

Final positions
- Champions: (Poland) Lower Silesia (1st title)
- Runners-up: (Bulgaria) South-East Region

The 2007 UEFA Regions' Cup was the fifth UEFA Regions' Cup. It was held in Bulgaria and won by the Lower Silesia team from Poland, which beat the host nation's South-East Region 2–1, after extra time, in the final.

== Preliminary round ==
The eight teams in the preliminary round were drawn into two groups of four, with the fixtures for each group being played in the same country. Group East's matches were played in Greece and those for Group West were played in Northern Ireland. The two group winners and the best runner-up advanced to the intermediary round.

=== Group East ===
Team	Pld	W	D	L	GF	GA	GD	Pts
(Greece) East Attica (H)	3	2	0	1	8	4	+4	6
(Russia) Southern Federal District	3	2	0	1	4	4	0	6
(Moldova) Chişinău	3	1	0	2	5	8	−3	3
(Belarus) Belcard Grodno	3	1	0	2	6	7	−1	3

19 September 2006
Belcard Grodno	2 – 3	Chişinău	Spata
East Attica	2 – 0	Southern Federal District	Keratea
21 September 2006
Southern Federal District	2 – 1	Chişinău	Keratea
East Attica	2 – 3	Belcard Grodno	Spata
23 September 2006
Southern Federal District	2 – 1	Belcard Grodno	Keratea
Chişinău	1 – 4	East Attica	Spata

=== Group West ===
Team	Pld	W	D	L	GF	GA	GD	Pts
(Northern Ireland) Eastern Region (H)	3	2	1	0	6	3	+3	7
(Finland) Uusimaa	3	1	2	0	5	4	+1	5
Central Scotland	3	1	1	1	5	3	+2	4
(Latvia) Vidzeme	3	0	0	3	1	7	−6	0

19 September 2006
Eastern Region	2 – 2	Uusimaa	Ballymena
Vidzeme	0 – 3	Central Scotland	Ballymena
21 September 2006
Uusimaa	2 – 2	Central Scotland	Loughgall
Eastern Region	3 – 1	Vidzeme	Newry
23 September 2006
Central Scotland	0 – 1	Eastern Region	Lurgan
Uusimaa	1 – 0	Vidzeme	Ballymena

== Intermediary round ==
The 29 teams which went straight through to the intermediary round were joined by Northern Ireland's Eastern Region, East Attica of Greece and the Russian Southern Federal District. The 32 teams were drawn into eight groups of four, with the following countries hosting each group's matches:

Group 1 – France
Group 2 – Netherlands
Group 3 – Bosnia and Herzegovina
Group 4 – Czech Republic
Group 5 – Ukraine
Group 6 – Azerbaijan
Group 7 – Bulgaria
Group 8 – Poland

The winners of each group qualified for the final tournament.

=== Group 1 ===
Team	Pld	W	D	L	GF	GA	GD	Pts
(France) Basse-Normandie (H)	3	2	1	0	4	1	+3	7
(Spain) Basque Country	3	1	1	1	3	3	0	4
Republic of Ireland	3	1	1	1	3	4	−1	4
(Lithuania) FK Alytis	3	0	1	2	1	3	−2	1

24 October 2006
Basse-Normandie	2 – 0	Republic of Ireland	Granville
Basque Country	1 – 0	FK Alytis	Saint-Lô
26 October 2006
Republic of Ireland	2 – 1	FK Alytis	Coutances
Basse-Normandie	2 – 1	Basque Country	Granville
28 October 2006
FK Alytis	0 – 0	Basse-Normandie	Saint-Lô
Republic of Ireland	1 – 1	Basque Country	Coutances

=== Group 2 ===
Team	Pld	W	D	L	GF	GA	GD	Pts
(Portugal) Aveiro	3	3	0	0	7	2	+5	9
(Netherlands) District West (H)	3	2	0	1	4	3	+1	6
East Estonia	3	0	1	2	1	4	−3	1
(Sweden) Kristinehamn	3	0	1	2	1	4	−3	1

23 October 2006
District West	1 – 2	Aveiro	Noordwijk
East Estonia	0 – 0	Kristinehamn	Lisse
25 October 2006
District West	1 – 0	East Estonia	Uithoorn
Aveiro	2 – 0	Kristinehamn	Noordwijk
27 October 2006
Kristinehamn	1 – 2	District West	Lisse
Aveiro	3 – 1	East Estonia	Uithoorn

=== Group 3 ===
Team	Pld	W	D	L	GF	GA	GD	Pts
(Bosnia and Herzegovina) Tuzla Canton (H)	3	1	2	0	3	2	+1	5
(Croatia) Varaždin	3	1	1	1	7	4	+3	4
(Russia) Southern Federal District	3	1	1	1	3	5	−2	4
(Hungary) Drava	3	0	2	1	4	6	−2	2

24 October 2006
Tuzla Canton	1 – 1	Southern Federal District	Tuzla
Drava	3 – 3	Varaždin	Banovići
26 October 2006
Tuzla Canton	1 – 1	Drava	Banovići
Southern Federal District	0 – 4	Varaždin	Tuzla
28 October 2006
Varaždin	0 – 1	Tuzla Canton	Tuzla
Southern Federal District	2 – 0	Drava	Banovići

=== Group 4 ===
Team	Pld	W	D	L	GF	GA	GD	Pts
(Northern Ireland) Eastern Region	3	2	1	0	4	1	+3	7
(Slovakia) Bratislava	3	1	1	1	3	3	0	4
(England) Isle of Man	3	1	0	2	4	5	−1	3
(Czech Republic) Hradec Králové (H)	3	1	0	2	5	7	−2	3

17 April 2007
Isle of Man	1 – 2	Bratislava	Trutnov
Hradec Králové	1 – 3	Eastern Region	Trutnov
19 April 2007
Eastern Region	0 – 0	Bratislava	Náchod
Hradec Králové	2 – 3	Isle of Man	Hradec Králové
21 April 2007
Bratislava	1 – 2	Hradec Králové	Trutnov
Eastern Region	1 – 0	Isle of Man	Hradec Králové

=== Group 5 ===
Team	Pld	W	D	L	GF	GA	GD	Pts
(Ukraine) Ivan Odesa (H)	3	2	1	0	2	0	+2	7
(Belgium) Centre	3	1	1	1	4	1	+3	4
(Slovenia) Ptuj & Celje	3	1	1	1	3	1	+2	4
Liechtenstein	3	0	1	2	0	7	−7	1

18 October 2006
Ivan Odesa	1 – 0	Centre	Odesa
Ptuj & Celje	3 – 0	Liechtenstein	Odesa
20 October 2006
Ivan Odesa	1 – 0	Ptuj & Celje	Odesa
Centre	4 – 0	Liechtenstein	Odesa
22 October 2006
Liechtenstein	0 – 0	Ivan Odesa	Odesa
Centre	0 – 0	Ptuj & Celje	Odesa

=== Group 6 ===
Team	Pld	W	D	L	GF	GA	GD	Pts
(Switzerland) Ticino	3	2	1	0	6	1	+5	7
(Serbia) Belgrade	3	2	1	0	4	0	+4	7
(Azerbaijan) Femida (H)	3	0	1	2	2	6	−4	1
(Georgia (country)) Tbilisi	3	0	1	2	1	6	−5	1

25 April 2007
Tbilisi	0 – 3	Ticino	Baku
Femida	0 – 2	Belgrade	Baku
27 April 2007
Ticino	0 – 0	Belgrade	Baku
Tbilisi	1 – 1	Femida	Baku
29 April 2007
Belgrade	2 – 0	Tbilisi	Baku
Ticino	3 – 1	Femida	Baku

=== Group 7 ===
Team	Pld	W	D	L	GF	GA	GD	Pts
(Bulgaria) South-East Region (H)	3	2	1	0	5	1	+4	7
(Romania) Oltenia	3	2	1	0	7	4	+3	7
(Greece) East Attica	3	1	0	2	5	6	−1	3
San Marino	3	0	0	3	1	7	−6	0

29 October 2006
South-East Region	1 – 0	San Marino	Teteven
Oltenia	3 – 2	East Attica	Pravets
31 October 2006
San Marino	1 – 3	Oltenia	Pravets
East Attica	0 – 3	South-East Region	Teteven
2 November 2006
South-East Region	1 – 1	Oltenia	Teteven
East Attica	3 – 0	San Marino	Pravets

=== Group 8 ===
Team	Pld	W	D	L	GF	GA	GD	Pts
(Poland) Lower Silesia (H)	3	2	1	0	14	2	+12	7
(Italy) Tuscany	3	2	0	1	11	2	+9	6
(Germany) Saxony	3	1	1	1	12	2	+10	4
Malta	3	0	0	3	0	31	−31	0

25 September 2006
Malta	0 – 11	Saxony	Wrocław
Lower Silesia	2 – 1	Tuscany	Wrocław
27 September 2006
Malta	0 – 11	Lower Silesia	Wrocław
Saxony	0 – 1	Tuscany	Wrocław
29 September 2006
Tuscany	9 – 0	Malta	Wrocław
Saxony	1 – 1	Lower Silesia	Wrocław

== Final tournament ==
Bulgaria was chosen to host the final tournament, with matches being played 20 June to 26 June 2007.

=== Group stage ===
The eight intermediary group winners were drawn into two groups of four, with the two group winners advancing to the final.

==== Group A ====
Team	Pld	W	D	L	GF	GA	GD	Pts
(Bulgaria) South-East Region (H)	3	1	2	0	2	1	+1	5
(Bosnia and Herzegovina) Tuzla Canton	3	1	1	1	3	3	0	4
(Northern Ireland) Eastern Region	3	1	1	1	1	2	−1	4
(France) Basse-Normandie	3	1	0	2	2	2	0	3

20 June 2007
South-East Region	1 – 1	Tuzla Canton	Sliven
Basse-Normandie	0 – 1	Eastern Region	Radnevo
22 June 2007
South-East Region	1 – 0	Basse-Normandie	Sliven
Tuzla Canton	2 – 0	Eastern Region	Radnevo
24 June 2007
Eastern Region	0 – 0	South-East Region	Sliven
Tuzla Canton	0 – 2	Basse-Normandie	Radnevo

==== Group B ====
Team	Pld	W	D	L	GF	GA	GD	Pts
(Poland) Lower Silesia	3	2	1	0	5	3	+2	7
(Portugal) Aveiro	3	1	1	1	3	3	0	4
(Ukraine) Ivan Odesa	3	1	0	2	2	4	−2	3
(Switzerland) Ticino	3	1	0	2	3	3	0	3

20 June 2007
Aveiro	0 – 2	Ticino	Stara Zagora
Ivan Odesa	1 – 2	Lower Silesia	Rakovski
22 June 2007
Aveiro	2 – 0	Ivan Odesa	Stadion Beroe, Stara Zagora
Ticino	1 – 2	Lower Silesia	Rakovski
24 June 2007
Lower Silesia	1 – 1	Aveiro	Stara Zagora
Ticino	0 – 1	Ivan Odesa	Rakovski

=== Final ===
26 June 2007

South-East Region (Bulgaria)	1 – 2 (aet)	(Poland) Lower Silesia
Stoyanov 66'	(Report)	Sudoł 78'; Jaskułowski 114'

Hadzhi Dimitar Stadium, Sliven
Attendance: ~3,500
Referee: Paolo Tagliavento (Italy)

2007 UEFA Regions' Cup
Winners
Lower Silesia

== See also ==
- UEFA Regions' Cup
