= Leiblfing =

- Municipality
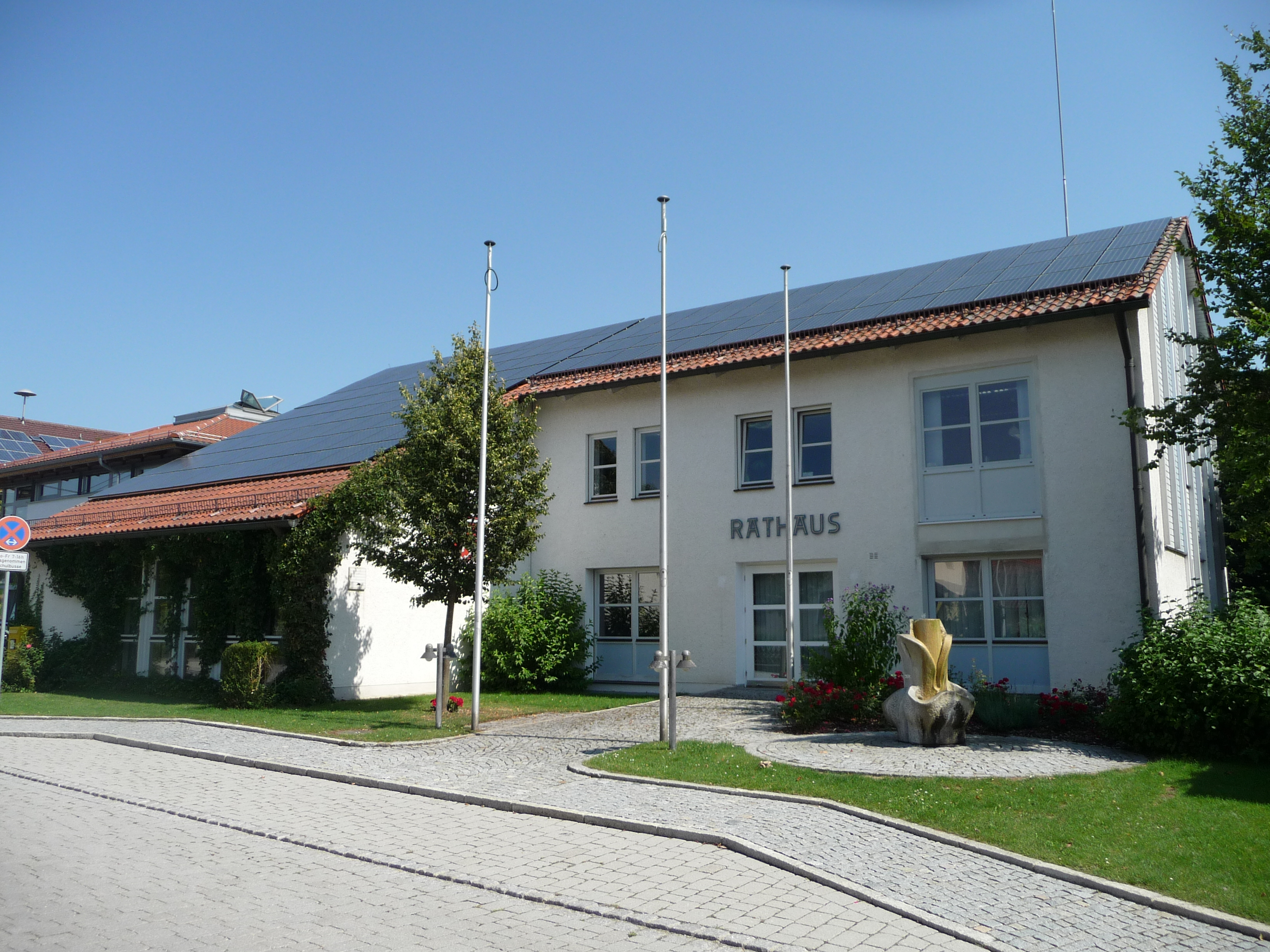
- Town hall

- Coat of arms

- Location of Leiblfing within Straubing-Bogen district
- Interactive map of Leiblfing
- Location within Germany Location within Bavaria
- Coordinates: 48°46′N 12°31′E
- Country: Germany
- State: Bavaria
- Admin. region: Niederbayern
- District: Straubing-Bogen

Government
  - Mayor (2020–26): Josef Moll (FW)

Area
  - Total: 78.41 km^{2} (30.27 sq mi)
- Elevation: 366 m (1,201 ft)

Population (2025-12-31)
  - Total: 4,370
  - Density: 55.7/km^{2} (144/sq mi)
- Time zone: UTC+01:00 (CET)
  - Summer (DST): UTC+02:00 (CEST)
- Postal codes: 94339
- Dialling codes: 09427
- Vehicle registration: SR
- Website: www.leiblfing.de

Leiblfing (German pronunciation: [ˈlaɪbl̩fɪŋ]) is a municipality in the district of Straubing-Bogen in Bavaria, Germany. It is famous as the birthplace of Anneliese Michel.
