= 2017 UEFA Regions' Cup =

Tournament details
- Host country: Final tournament: Turkey
- Dates: Preliminary round: 21 May – 7 June 2016; Intermediate round: 20 September – 18 November 2016; Final tournament: 1–9 July 2017
- Teams: Final tournament: 8 Total: 38 (from 38 associations)

Final positions
- Champions: (Croatia) Zagreb (1st title)
- Runners-up: (Republic of Ireland) Munster/Connacht
- Third place: (Turkey) Istanbul (Russia) Rostov Oblast

Tournament statistics
- Matches played: 73
- Goals scored: 223 (3.05 per match)
- Top scorer(s): Season total: Željko Štulec (8 goals); Final tournament: Roberto García Puente (4 goals)

The 2017 UEFA Regions' Cup was the 10th edition of the UEFA Regions' Cup, a football competition for amateur teams in Europe organized by UEFA.

Zagreb, which lost to Leinster/Munster (Eastern Region) in the previous edition's final, defeated Munster/Connacht (Region 2), also from the Republic of Ireland, in this edition's final to become the first team from Croatia to win the UEFA Regions' Cup.

== Teams ==
A total of 38 teams entered the tournament. Each of the 54 UEFA member associations could enter a regional amateur representative team which qualified through a national qualifying competition, or when applicable, their national amateur representative team.

Teams were ranked according to their UEFA coefficients, computed based on results of the last three seasons, to decide on the round they entered. The top 30 teams entered the intermediate round, and the bottom 8 teams (ranked 31–38) entered the preliminary round.

Rank	Association	Team	Qualified through	Coeff	Pot
Intermediate round
1	(Republic of Ireland) Republic of Ireland	Munster/Connacht (Region 2)	2016 Republic of Ireland play-off for UEFA Regions' Cup	13.333	A
2	Germany	Bremen	2015 U 18-Sichtungsturnier	12.333	A
3	Russia	Rostov Oblast (South Region)	2015–16 Russian Division IV play-offs (region of winning club)	12.333	A
4	Spain	Castile and León	2015–16 Spanish stage of the UEFA Regions' Cup	12.000	A
5	Italy	Lombardia	2015 Trofeo delle Regioni	11.667	A
6	Turkey	Istanbul	2016 Turkish stage of the UEFA Regions' Cup	10.667	A
7	Poland	Lower Silesia	2015 Polish stage of the UEFA Regions' Cup	10.667	A
8	(Czech Republic) Czech Republic	Olomouc Region	2016 Czech stage of the UEFA Regions' Cup	10.667	A
9	Hungary	Szabolcs-Szatmár-Bereg (East Region)	2016 Hungarian stage of the UEFA Regions' Cup	10.333	A
10	(Northern Ireland) Northern Ireland	Fermanagh & Western/North-West (Western Region)	2016 Northern Ireland play-off for UEFA Regions' Cup	9.833	A
11	Croatia	Zagreb	2016 Croatian stage of the UEFA Regions' Cup	9.000	A
12	Serbia	Vojvodina	2016 Serbian stage of the UEFA Regions' Cup	9.000	A
13	Ukraine	FC Inhulets (Kirovohrad Oblast)	2015–16 FFU Regions' Cup	9.000	A
14	Bulgaria	South-West Region	Regional amateur team	8.667	A
15	France	Paris Île-de-France	2015–16 French stage of the UEFA Regions' Cup	8.000	A
16	Portugal	Lisbon	2016 Taça das Regiões	8.000	A
17	Slovakia	West Slovakia	2015 Slovak stage of the UEFA Regions' Cup	7.667	B
18	Belarus	FC Zvezda-FOTS Victoria (Minsk)	2015 Belarusian stage of the UEFA Regions' Cup	7.000	B
19	Azerbaijan	Sharur FK	2014–15 AFFA Amateur League	7.000	B
20	Latvia	FC Caramba Riga	2015 Latvian Second League	6.333	B
21	England	West Yorkshire	2015–16 FA Inter-League Cup	6.333	B
22	(Bosnia and Herzegovina) Bosnia and Herzegovina	Tuzla Canton	2016 Bosnian stage of the UEFA Regions' Cup	6.333	B
23	(North Macedonia) Macedonia	North-East Macedonia	Regional amateur team	5.833	B
24	Malta	Gozo	Regional amateur team	5.667	B
25	Moldova	Soroca	2016 Moldovan stage of the UEFA Regions' Cup	5.667	B
26	Israel	FC Hapoel Bik'at HaYarden	2015–16 Liga Alef play-off for UEFA Regions' Cup	5.333	B
27	Switzerland	Geneva	2016 Swiss stage of the UEFA Regions' Cup	5.000	B
28	Finland	SC KuFu-98 (Eastern Finland)	2015 Finnish stage of the UEFA Regions' Cup	5.000	B
29	Romania	Prahova-Muntenia	2016 Romanian stage of the UEFA Regions' Cup	4.667	B
30	Slovenia	Maribor	2016 Slovenian stage of the UEFA Regions' Cup	4.667	B
Preliminary round
31	Lithuania	FK Nevėžis	2015 LFF I lyga (chosen by association)	4.333	1
32	Scotland	East West Central Scotland	Regional amateur team	4.167	1
33	Sweden	Kärra KIF (Region of Gothenburg)	2015 Swedish stage of the UEFA Regions' Cup	4.000	1
34	(San Marino) San Marino	San Marino	National amateur team	3.333	1
35	Greece	Xanthi Region	2016 Greek stage of the UEFA Regions' Cup	2.667	1
36	Wales	South Wales	2016 Welsh stage of the UEFA Regions' Cup	2.333	1
37	Estonia	Tartu FC Merkuur	2015 Estonian Small Cup	2.000	1
38	Kazakhstan	ZSMK	2013 Kazakhstan Second Division	0.000	1

Did not enter
Albania	Andorra	Armenia	Austria
Belgium	Cyprus	Denmark	(Faroe Islands) Faroe Islands
(Georgia (country)) Georgia	Gibraltar	Iceland	Liechtenstein
Luxembourg	Montenegro	Netherlands	Norway

The draws for the preliminary round and intermediate round were held on 3 December 2015, 14:00 CET (UTC+1), at the UEFA headquarters in Nyon, Switzerland. The mechanism of the draws for each round was as follows:

- In the preliminary round, the eight teams were drawn into two groups of four without any seeding.
- In the intermediate round, the 32 teams were drawn into eight groups of four with the following seeding:
  - Groups 1–2 contained two teams from Pot A (teams ranked 1–16), one team from Pot B (teams ranked 17–30), and one preliminary round winner (preliminary round Group A winner assigned to Group 1, preliminary round Group B winner assigned to Group 2)
  - Groups 3–8 contained two teams from Pot A and two teams from Pot B.

== Format ==
In the preliminary round and intermediate round, each group is played as a round-robin mini-tournament at one of the teams selected as hosts after the draw.

In the final tournament, the eight qualified teams play a group stage (two groups of four) followed by the final between the group winners, at a host selected by UEFA from one of the teams.

=== Tiebreakers ===
In the preliminary round, intermediate round, and group stage of the final tournament, teams are ranked according to points (3 points for a win, 1 point for a draw, 0 points for a loss), and if tied on points, the following tiebreaking criteria are applied, in the order given, to determine the rankings (regulations Articles 14.01, 14.02, 16.01 and 16.02):

1. Points in head-to-head matches among tied teams;
2. Goal difference in head-to-head matches among tied teams;
3. Goals scored in head-to-head matches among tied teams;
4. If more than two teams are tied, and after applying criteria 1 to 3, a subset of teams are still tied, criteria 1 to 3 are reapplied exclusively to this subset of teams;
5. Goal difference in all group matches;
6. Goals scored in all group matches;
7. If only two teams have the same number of points, and they met in the last round of the group and are tied after applying criteria 1 to 6, their rankings are determined by a penalty shoot-out (not used if more than two teams have the same number of points, or if their rankings are not relevant for qualification for the next stage);
8. Disciplinary points (red card = 3 points, yellow card = 1 point, expulsion for two yellow cards in one match = 3 points);
9. Drawing of lots.

== Preliminary round ==
The two group winners advance to the intermediate round to join the 30 teams which receive byes to the intermediate round. Matches must be played between 1 May and 31 July 2016.

All times are CEST (UTC+2).

=== Group A ===
Pos	Team	Pld	W	D	L	GF	GA	GD	Pts	Qualification
1	East West Central Scotland	3	2	1	0	11	1	+10	7	Intermediate round
2	(Lithuania) FK Nevėžis (H)	3	2	1	0	8	3	+5	7	
3	(Sweden) Kärra KIF	3	1	0	2	4	4	0	3	
4	(Estonia) Tartu FC Merkuur	3	0	0	3	3	18	−15	0	

Source: UEFA
Rules for classification: Tiebreakers
(H) Hosts
21 May 2016
11:00

Tartu FC Merkuur (Estonia)	1–4	(Sweden) Kärra KIF
Šatov 85'	Report	Konkell 20'; M. Andersson 27'; Nygård 31', 90+2'

National Football Academy Stadium, Kaunas
Referee: Martin Lundby (Norway)
21 May 2016
15:00

East West Central Scotland	1–1	(Lithuania) FK Nevėžis
Feaks 85'	Report	Ar. Gėgžna 87'

National Football Academy Stadium, Kaunas
Referee: Nicolas Laforge (Belgium)

23 May 2016
13:00

East West Central Scotland	9–0	(Estonia) Tartu FC Merkuur
MacPherson 14', 32'; Kneale 16', 19', 46'; Mclean 44'; Matthews 77', 78'; Bruce 84'	Report

National Football Academy Stadium, Kaunas
Referee: João Capela (Portugal)
23 May 2016
17:00

Kärra KIF (Sweden)	0–2	(Lithuania) FK Nevėžis
	Report	R. Lipnevicius 39'; Kugys 64'

National Football Academy Stadium, Kaunas
Referee: Martin Lundby (Norway)

25 May 2016
17:00

Kärra KIF (Sweden)	0–1	East West Central Scotland
	Report	Kneale 59'

National Football Academy Stadium, Kaunas
Referee: Nicolas Laforge (Belgium)
25 May 2016
17:00

FK Nevėžis (Lithuania)	5–2	(Estonia) Tartu FC Merkuur
Ai. Gėgžna 19'; Ar. Gėgžna 39'; R. Lipnevicius 40'; Petronis 72'; Kugys 87'	Report	Šatov 33', 65' (pen.)

Darius and Girėnas Stadium, Kaunas
Referee: João Capela (Portugal)

=== Group B ===
Pos	Team	Pld	W	D	L	GF	GA	GD	Pts	Qualification
1	San Marino (H)	3	2	1	0	8	1	+7	7	Intermediate round
2	(Greece) Xanthi Region	3	1	1	1	7	4	+3	4	
3	(Kazakhstan) ZSMK	3	1	0	2	3	9	−6	3	
4	South Wales	3	1	0	2	5	9	−4	3	

Source: UEFA
Rules for classification: Tiebreakers
(H) Hosts
3 June 2016
16:00

San Marino	4–0	South Wales
Jaupi 45', 53'; Bernardi 65'; Battistini 77'	Report

Stadio Montecchio, San Marino
Referee: Lasha Silagava (Georgia)
3 June 2016
19:00

ZSMK (Kazakhstan)	0–4	(Greece) Xanthi Region
	Report	Tourgaidis 4'; Karagkiozis 35'; Tourgaidis 38' (pen.); Mavropoulos 45+1'

San Marino Stadium, Serravalle
Referee: Fedayi San (Switzerland)

5 June 2016
16:00

South Wales	3–2	(Greece) Xanthi Region
Morris 27'; Long 45'; Lewis 90' (pen.)	Report	Kononas 48'; Karagkiozis 60'

Stadio Montecchio, San Marino
Referee: Lasha Silagava (Georgia)
5 June 2016
19:00

ZSMK (Kazakhstan)	0–3	San Marino
	Report	Jaupi 7'; Bernardi 12', 16'

San Marino Stadium, Serravalle
Referee: Ignasi Villamayor Rozados (Andorra)

7 June 2016
16:00

South Wales	2–3	(Kazakhstan) ZSMK
Jenkins 13'; Quick 54'	Report	Bogomolov 3'; Seissenbekov 23'; Duisekulov 90'

San Marino Stadium, Serravalle
Referee: Ignasi Villamayor Rozados (Andorra)
7 June 2016
16:00

Xanthi Region (Greece)	1–1	San Marino
Lipen 21' (o.g.)	Report	Jaupi 72'

Stadio Montecchio, San Marino
Referee: Fedayi San (Switzerland)

== Intermediate round ==
The eight group winners advance to the final tournament. Matches must be played between 15 August and 15 December 2016.

Times up to 29 October 2016 are CEST (UTC+2), thereafter times are CET (UTC+1).

=== Group 1 ===
Pos	Team	Pld	W	D	L	GF	GA	GD	Pts	Qualification
1	(Ukraine) FC Inhulets	3	3	0	0	8	2	+6	9	Final tournament
2	Paris Île-de-France	3	1	1	1	5	2	+3	4	
3	East West Central Scotland	3	1	0	2	5	7	−2	3	
4	(Malta) Gozo (H)	3	0	1	2	1	8	−7	1	

Source: UEFA
Rules for classification: Tiebreakers
(H) Hosts
5 October 2016
13:00

Paris Île-de-France	1–2	(Ukraine) FC Inhulets
Said 35'	Report	Bozhenko 30', 75'

Gozo Stadium, Xewkija
Referee: Ante Vučemilović (Croatia)
5 October 2016
16:30

Gozo (Malta)	0–5	East West Central Scotland
	Report	Heaver 12' (pen.); Moore 56', 87'; Butler 77'; McClure 87'

Gozo Stadium, Xewkija
Referee: Sascha Amhof (Switzerland)

7 October 2016
13:00

Paris Île-de-France	0–0	(Malta) Gozo
	Report

Gozo Stadium, Xewkija
Referee: Georgi Vadachkoria (Georgia)
7 October 2016
16:30

East West Central Scotland	0–3	(Ukraine) FC Inhulets
	Report	Sorokyn 13' (pen.); Petruk 24'; Horshchynskyi 79'

Gozo Stadium, Xewkija
Referee: Sascha Amhof (Switzerland)

9 October 2016
15:00

East West Central Scotland	0–4	Paris Île-de-France
	Report	Harel 53', 56'; Marpaux 62'; Methven 90+2' (o.g.)

Kercem Ajax Stadium, Kerċem
Referee: Ante Vučemilović (Croatia)
9 October 2016
15:00

FC Inhulets (Ukraine)	3–1	(Malta) Gozo
Bozhenko 20'; Horshchynskyi 62'; Sorokyn 90' (pen.)	Report	Mizzi 10'

Gozo Stadium, Xewkija
Referee: Georgi Vadachkoria (Georgia)

=== Group 2 ===
Pos	Team	Pld	W	D	L	GF	GA	GD	Pts	Qualification
1	(Spain) Castile and León	3	2	0	1	7	1	+6	6	Final tournament
2	(Bulgaria) South-West Region (H)	3	2	0	1	7	5	+2	6	
3	San Marino	3	2	0	1	3	5	−2	6	
4	(Bosnia and Herzegovina) Tuzla Canton	3	0	0	3	0	6	−6	0	

Source: UEFA
Rules for classification: Tiebreakers
(H) Hosts
27 October 2016
13:00

Castile and León (Spain)	4–0	(Bulgaria) South-West Region
Rodriguez Ramos 32'; Cabral 61', 90+1'; Cabral De Barros 90'	Report

Septemvri Stadium, Simitli
Referee: Sergey Tsinkevich (Belarus)
27 October 2016
13:00

Tuzla Canton (Bosnia and Herzegovina)	0–1	San Marino
	Report	Jaupi 63'

Septemvri Stadium, Razlog
Referee: Aleksandr Gauzer (Kazakhstan)

29 October 2016
13:00

Castile and León (Spain)	3–0	(Bosnia and Herzegovina) Tuzla Canton
Mato 23' (pen.); Coque Pérez 25'; Cabral De Barros 54'	Report

Septemvri Stadium, Simitli
Referee: Vasilis Dimitriou (Cyprus)
29 October 2016
13:00

San Marino	1–5	(Bulgaria) South-West Region
Jaupi 90'	Report	Syunetchiev 13'; Yurukov 54'; Hadzhiev 72', 74'; Dzhondzhorov 90+2'

Septemvri Stadium, Razlog
Referee: Sergey Tsinkevich (Belarus)

31 October 2016
13:00

San Marino	1–0	(Spain) Castile and León
Cuttone 27'	Report

Septemvri Stadium, Razlog
Referee: Aleksandr Gauzer (Kazakhstan)
31 October 2016
13:00

South-West Region (Bulgaria)	2–0	(Bosnia and Herzegovina) Tuzla Canton
Pushkarov 22'; Hadzhiev 43'	Report

Septemvri Stadium, Simitli
Referee: Vasilis Dimitriou (Cyprus)

=== Group 3 ===
Pos	Team	Pld	W	D	L	GF	GA	GD	Pts	Qualification
1	(Russia) Rostov Oblast	3	2	1	0	8	6	+2	7	Final tournament
2	(England) West Yorkshire	3	1	2	0	5	4	+1	5	
3	(Serbia) Vojvodina	3	1	1	1	7	6	+1	4	
4	(Romania) Prahova-Muntenia (H)	3	0	0	3	3	7	−4	0	

Source: UEFA
Rules for classification: Tiebreakers
(H) Hosts
20 September 2016
10:00

Prahova-Muntenia (Romania)	1–2	(England) West Yorkshire
Micu 7' (pen.)	Report	Greaves 14'; Frankland 44' (pen.)

Football Centre FRF, Buftea
Referee: Carlos Xistra (Portugal)
20 September 2016
16:00

Rostov Oblast (Russia)	4–3	(Serbia) Vojvodina
Parakhin 2'; Obernibesov 32' (pen.), 47'; Kartashov 35'	Report	Erak 21'; Simikić 27'; Savić 78'

Football Centre FRF, Buftea
Referee: Aleksandrs Golubevs (Latvia)

22 September 2016
10:00

West Yorkshire (England)	1–1	(Serbia) Vojvodina
Day 55'	Report	Vuković 11'

Football Centre FRF, Buftea
Referee: Carlos Xistra (Portugal)
22 September 2016
16:00

Rostov Oblast (Russia)	2–1	(Romania) Prahova-Muntenia
Kartashov 37'; Lomovtsev 75'	Report	Ciobanu 74'

Football Centre FRF, Buftea
Referee: Thoroddur Hjaltalin (Iceland)

24 September 2016
16:00

West Yorkshire (England)	2–2	(Russia) Rostov Oblast
Cunningham 34'; Day 61'	Report	Khodzhumyan 31', 46'

Football Centre FRF, Buftea
Referee: Aleksandrs Golubevs (Latvia)
24 September 2016
16:00

Vojvodina (Serbia)	3–1	(Romania) Prahova-Muntenia
Vuković 12' (pen.), 79'; Gudan 59'	Report	Pirvan 83'

Stadionul Anghel Iordănescu, Voluntari
Referee: Thoroddur Hjaltalin (Iceland)

=== Group 4 ===
Pos	Team	Pld	W	D	L	GF	GA	GD	Pts	Qualification
1	(Portugal) Lisbon	3	3	0	0	5	0	+5	9	Final tournament
2	(Poland) Lower Silesia (H)	3	2	0	1	10	3	+7	6	
3	(Belarus) FC Zvezda-FOTS Victoria	3	0	1	2	2	5	−3	1	
4	(Latvia) FC Caramba Riga	3	0	1	2	1	10	−9	1	

Source: UEFA
Rules for classification: Tiebreakers
(H) Hosts
24 September 2016
14:00

Lisbon (Portugal)	2–0	(Poland) Lower Silesia
Neves 19'; Pinto 31'	Report

Stadion Miejski, Legnica
Attendance: 228
Referee: Nikolai Yordanov (Bulgaria)
24 September 2016
17:00

FC Caramba Riga (Latvia)	1–1	(Belarus) FC Zvezda-FOTS Victoria
Grablovskis 90+1'	Report	Radziuk 27'

Stadion Miejski, Polkowice
Attendance: 20
Referee: Dag Vidar Hafsås (Norway)

26 September 2016
14:00

Lisbon (Portugal)	2–0	(Latvia) FC Caramba Riga
Alves 50'; Jalo 89'	Report

Stadion Miejski, Polkowice
Attendance: 20
Referee: Dag Vidar Hafsås (Norway)
26 September 2016
17:00

FC Zvezda-FOTS Victoria (Belarus)	1–3	(Poland) Lower Silesia
Hurynovich 49'	Report	Niedojad 68', 87'; Firlej 71'

Stadion Miejski, Legnica
Attendance: 102
Referee: Christos Nicolaides (Cyprus)

28 September 2016
17:00

FC Zvezda-FOTS Victoria (Belarus)	0–1	(Portugal) Lisbon
	Report	Alves 90+3'

Stadion Miejski, Polkowice
Attendance: 20
Referee: Nikolai Yordanov (Bulgaria)
28 September 2016
17:00

Lower Silesia (Poland)	7–0	(Latvia) FC Caramba Riga
Łuczak 15' (pen.), 90+1'; Jakóbczyk 38', 58'; Niewiadomski 55'; Niedojad 78', 85'	Report

Stadion Miejski, Legnica
Attendance: 115
Referee: Christos Nicolaides (Cyprus)

=== Group 5 ===
Pos	Team	Pld	W	D	L	GF	GA	GD	Pts	Qualification
1	(Turkey) Istanbul	3	2	1	0	3	0	+3	7	Final tournament
2	(Switzerland) Geneva	3	2	0	1	3	2	+1	6	
3	(Moldova) Soroca (H)	3	1	1	1	2	2	0	4	
4	(Northern Ireland) Fermanagh & Western/North-West	3	0	0	3	2	6	−4	0	

Source: UEFA
Rules for classification: Tiebreakers
(H) Hosts
14 November 2016
13:00

Istanbul (Turkey)	2–0	(Northern Ireland) Fermanagh & Western/North-West
Uysal 9'; Akgöz 35'	Report

CSR Orhei, Orhei
Referee: Pavle Radovanović (Montenegro)
14 November 2016
13:00

Soroca (Moldova)	0–1	(Switzerland) Geneva
	Report	Mbaye 70'

Zimbru-2 Stadium, Chișinău
Referee: Radek Příhoda (Czech Republic)

16 November 2016
13:00

Istanbul (Turkey)	0–0	(Moldova) Soroca
	Report

Zimbru-2 Stadium, Chișinău
Referee: Sven Bindels (Luxembourg)
16 November 2016
13:00

Geneva (Switzerland)	2–1	(Northern Ireland) Fermanagh & Western/North-West
Lhoneux 20', 77'	Report	Browne 87'

CSR Orhei, Orhei
Referee: Radek Příhoda (Czech Republic)

18 November 2016
13:00

Geneva (Switzerland)	0–1	(Turkey) Istanbul
	Report	Akgöz 74'

CSR Orhei, Orhei
Referee: Pavle Radovanović (Montenegro)
18 November 2016
13:00

Fermanagh & Western/North-West (Northern Ireland)	1–2	(Moldova) Soroca
Warnock 50'	Report	Anițoaie 23'; Rogac 32'

Zimbru-2 Stadium, Chișinău
Referee: Sven Bindels (Luxembourg)

=== Group 6 ===
Pos	Team	Pld	W	D	L	GF	GA	GD	Pts	Qualification
1	(Czech Republic) Olomouc Region (H)	3	1	2	0	5	2	+3	5	Final tournament
2	(Germany) Bremen	3	1	2	0	5	3	+2	5	
3	West Slovakia	3	0	3	0	1	1	0	3	
4	(Israel) FC Hapoel Bik'at HaYarden	3	0	1	2	2	7	−5	1	

Source: UEFA
Rules for classification: Tiebreakers
(H) Hosts
21 September 2016
13:00

FC Hapoel Bik'at HaYarden (Israel)	1–1	West Slovakia
Machpod 9' (pen.)	Report	Kočiš 23'

Stadion Řepčín, Olomouc
Referee: Artyom Kuchin (Kazakhstan)
21 September 2016
15:30

Olomouc Region (Czech Republic)	2–2	(Germany) Bremen
Woitek 51'; M. Navrátil 90+3'	Report	Grundmann 34'; Kurkiewicz 90+5'

Andrův stadion, Olomouc
Referee: Vlado Glođović (Serbia)

23 September 2016
13:00

West Slovakia	0–0	(Germany) Bremen
	Report

Stadion Řepčín, Olomouc
Referee: Vlado Glođović (Serbia)
23 September 2016
15:30

Olomouc Region (Czech Republic)	3–0	(Israel) FC Hapoel Bik'at HaYarden
P. Navrátil 18'; Woitek 24'; Bříza 77'	Report

Andrův stadion, Olomouc
Referee: Lorenc Jemini (Albania)

25 September 2016
11:00

West Slovakia	0–0	(Czech Republic) Olomouc Region
	Report

Andrův stadion, Olomouc
Referee: Artyom Kuchin (Kazakhstan)
25 September 2016
11:00

Bremen (Germany)	3–1	(Israel) FC Hapoel Bik'at HaYarden
Kurkiewicz 60' (pen.); Dressler 84'; Tietze 86'	Report	Yacov 13'

Stadion Řepčín, Olomouc
Referee: Lorenc Jemini (Albania)

=== Group 7 ===
Pos	Team	Pld	W	D	L	GF	GA	GD	Pts	Qualification
1	(Republic of Ireland) Munster/Connacht	3	2	1	0	3	0	+3	7	Final tournament
2	(Italy) Lombardia (H)	3	2	0	1	5	2	+3	6	
3	(Slovenia) Maribor	3	0	2	1	1	4	−3	2	
4	(North Macedonia) North-East Macedonia	3	0	1	2	0	3	−3	1	

Source: UEFA
Rules for classification: Tiebreakers
(H) Hosts
28 September 2016
15:30

Lombardia (Italy)	0–1	(Republic of Ireland) Munster/Connacht
	Report	Hayes 22' (pen.)

Stadio Città di Gorgonzola, Gorgonzola
Referee: Ken Henry Johnsen (Norway)
28 September 2016
15:30

Maribor (Slovenia)	0–0	(North Macedonia) North-East Macedonia
	Report

Stadio Ferruccio, Seregno
Referee: Aleksei Nikolaev (Russia)

30 September 2016
15:30

Lombardia (Italy)	4–1	(Slovenia) Maribor
Pagano 10'; Fall 15'; Talon 33' (pen.); Torri 90'	Report	Verhovnik 29' (pen.)

Stadio Breda, Sesto San Giovanni
Referee: Markus Hameter (Austria)
30 September 2016
15:30

North-East Macedonia (North Macedonia)	0–2	(Republic of Ireland) Munster/Connacht
	Report	Daly-Butz 19'; Hoban 49'

Centro Sportivo Comunale Inveruno, Inveruno
Referee: Aleksei Nikolaev (Russia)

2 October 2016
15:30

North-East Macedonia (North Macedonia)	0–1	(Italy) Lombardia
	Report	Bressanelli 90+3'

Stadio Felice Chinetti, Solbiate Arno
Referee: Ken Henry Johnsen (Norway)
2 October 2016
15:30

Munster/Connacht (Republic of Ireland)	0–0	(Slovenia) Maribor
	Report

Stadio Comunale di Caravaggio, Caravaggio
Referee: Markus Hameter (Austria)

=== Group 8 ===
Pos	Team	Pld	W	D	L	GF	GA	GD	Pts	Qualification
1	(Croatia) Zagreb	3	3	0	0	12	0	+12	9	Final tournament
2	(Hungary) Szabolcs-Szatmár-Bereg (H)	3	2	0	1	8	4	+4	6	
3	(Finland) SC KuFu-98	3	1	0	2	3	7	−4	3	
4	(Azerbaijan) Sharur FK	3	0	0	3	0	12	−12	0	

Source: UEFA
Rules for classification: Tiebreakers
(H) Hosts
24 October 2016
13:00

Szabolcs-Szatmár-Bereg (Hungary)	0–4	(Croatia) Zagreb
	Report	Lovrić 16', 18'; Štulec 39'; Ćibarić 65'

Kisvárdai Stadion, Kisvárda
Referee: Yuriy Mozharovskyy (Ukraine)
24 October 2016
13:00

Sharur FK (Azerbaijan)	0–3	(Finland) SC KuFu-98
	Report	Pöyhönen 5'; Tuovinen 72'; Räsänen 83'

Városi Stadion, Nyíregyháza
Referee: Dimitar Meckarovski (Macedonia)

26 October 2016
13:00

Szabolcs-Szatmár-Bereg (Hungary)	6–0	(Azerbaijan) Sharur FK
Orosz 24'; Kiss 43', 51'; Costea 60'; Szaffián 85', 90'	Report

Kisvárdai Stadion, Kisvárda
Referee: Veaceslav Banari (Moldova)
26 October 2016
13:00

SC KuFu-98 (Finland)	0–5	(Croatia) Zagreb
	Report	Štulec 50' (pen.), 59', 80'; Lovrić 71', 73'

Városi Stadion, Nyíregyháza
Referee: Yuriy Mozharovskyy (Ukraine)

28 October 2016
13:00

SC KuFu-98 (Finland)	0–2	(Hungary) Szabolcs-Szatmár-Bereg
	Report	Cseh 72'; József 86'

Városi Stadion, Nyíregyháza
Referee: Dimitar Meckarovski (Macedonia)
28 October 2016
13:00

Zagreb (Croatia)	3–0	(Azerbaijan) Sharur FK
Švigir 35'; Štulec 60', 68'	Report

Kisvárdai Stadion, Kisvárda
Referee: Veaceslav Banari (Moldova)

== Final tournament ==
The hosts of the final tournament was selected by UEFA from the eight qualified teams, with UEFA announcing on 21 December 2016 that it would be hosted in Istanbul, Turkey between 1 and 9 July 2017.

The draw for the final tournament was held on 2 March 2017, 17:00 TRT (UTC+3), at the Turkish Football Federation headquarters in Istanbul. The eight teams were drawn into two groups of four without any seeding, except that the hosts were assigned to position A1 in the draw. Based on the decisions taken by the UEFA Emergency Panel, teams from Russia and Ukraine would not be drawn into the same group. The final tournament schedule was confirmed on 4 May 2017.

The two group winners advance to the final, while the two group runners-up receive bronze medals. In the final, extra time and penalty shoot-out are used to decide the winner if necessary.

All times are CEST (UTC+2); local times, TRT (UTC+3), are in parentheses.

=== Group A ===
Pos	Team	Pld	W	D	L	GF	GA	GD	Pts	Qualification
1	(Croatia) Zagreb	3	2	1	0	8	3	+5	7	Final
2	(Turkey) Istanbul (H)	3	1	1	1	4	3	+1	4	Bronze medal
3	(Portugal) Lisbon	3	0	3	0	6	6	0	3	
4	(Ukraine) FC Inhulets	3	0	1	2	4	10	−6	1	

Source: UEFA
Rules for classification: Tiebreakers
(H) Hosts
1 July 2017
14:00
(15:00 UTC+3)

Zagreb (Croatia)	2–2	(Portugal) Lisbon
Štulec 24'; Adžić 41'	Report	Cardoso 36'; Honrado 57'

TFF Riva Stadium, Istanbul
Referee: Thoroddur Hjaltalin (Iceland)
1 July 2017
17:15
(18:15 UTC+3)

Istanbul (Turkey)	3–0	(Ukraine) FC Inhulets
Uysal 34'; Özcan 52'; Akgöz 90+2' (pen.)	Report

TFF Riva Stadium, Istanbul
Referee: Nikolai Yordanov (Bulgaria)

3 July 2017
14:00
(15:00 UTC+3)

FC Inhulets (Ukraine)	3–3	(Portugal) Lisbon
Horshchynskyi 8'; Sorokyn 33' (pen.); Bozhenko 78'	Report	Flecha 23', 38', 88'

TFF Riva Stadium, Istanbul
Referee: Lasha Silagava (Georgia)
3 July 2017
17:15
(18:15 UTC+3)

Istanbul (Turkey)	0–2	(Croatia) Zagreb
	Report	Adžić 16'; Šimunić 67'

TFF Riva Stadium, Istanbul
Referee: Dimitar Meckarovski (Macedonia)

6 July 2017
17:15
(18:15 UTC+3)

Lisbon (Portugal)	1–1	(Turkey) Istanbul
Cardoso 41'	Report	Kallıoğlu 90+5'

TFF Riva Stadium, Istanbul
Referee: Michael Tykgaard (Denmark)
6 July 2017
17:15
(18:15 UTC+3)

FC Inhulets (Ukraine)	1–4	(Croatia) Zagreb
Bozhenko 90'	Report	Filipović 43'; Mohač 45'; Štulec 83'; Krajačić 90+1'

Yusuf Ziya Öniş Stadium, Istanbul
Referee: Artyom Kuchin (Kazakhstan)

=== Group B ===
Pos	Team	Pld	W	D	L	GF	GA	GD	Pts	Qualification
1	(Republic of Ireland) Munster/Connacht	3	2	1	0	5	1	+4	7	Final
2	(Russia) Rostov Oblast	3	2	0	1	5	4	+1	6	Bronze medal
3	(Spain) Castile and León	3	1	1	1	6	4	+2	4	
4	(Czech Republic) Olomouc Region	3	0	0	3	3	10	−7	0	

Source: UEFA
Rules for classification: Tiebreakers
1 July 2017
14:00
(15:00 UTC+3)

Castile and León (Spain)	4–1	(Czech Republic) Olomouc Region
García Puente 3', 45'; Rodriguez Ramos 64'; Jorge Vegas 90+1'	Report	P. Navrátil 58'

Ümraniye İlçe Stadyumu, Istanbul
Referee: Lasha Silagava (Georgia)
1 July 2017
17:15
(18:15 UTC+3)

Munster/Connacht (Republic of Ireland)	1–0	(Russia) Rostov Oblast
Hayes 26'	Report

Yusuf Ziya Öniş Stadium, Istanbul
Referee: Dimitar Meckarovski (Macedonia)

3 July 2017
14:00
(15:00 UTC+3)

Castile and León (Spain)	0–0	(Republic of Ireland) Munster/Connacht
	Report

Ümraniye İlçe Stadyumu, Istanbul
Referee: Artyom Kuchin (Kazakhstan)
3 July 2017
17:15
(18:15 UTC+3)

Olomouc Region (Czech Republic)	1–2	(Russia) Rostov Oblast
Woitek 45'	Report	Donskov 14'; Lomovtsev 54'

Yusuf Ziya Öniş Stadium, Istanbul
Referee: Michael Tykgaard (Denmark)

6 July 2017
14:00
(15:00 UTC+3)

Rostov Oblast (Russia)	3–2	(Spain) Castile and León
Nastavshev 64'; Khodzhumyan 76' (pen.); Sokolov 90+2'	Report	García Puente 16', 19'

TFF Riva Stadium, Istanbul
Referee: Nikolai Yordanov (Bulgaria)
6 July 2017
14:00
(15:00 UTC+3)

Olomouc Region (Czech Republic)	1–4	(Republic of Ireland) Munster/Connacht
P. Navrátil 35'	Report	Kelly 22'; Hayes 39', 51'; Carr 83'

Ümraniye İlçe Stadyumu, Istanbul
Referee: Thoroddur Hjaltalin (Iceland)

=== Final ===
9 July 2017
15:30
(16:30 UTC+3)

Zagreb (Croatia)	1–0	(Republic of Ireland) Munster/Connacht
Adžić 26'	Report

TFF Riva Stadium, Istanbul
Referee: Artyom Kuchin (Kazakhstan)

== Top goalscorers ==
— Team eliminated / inactive for this stage.

Rank	Player	Team	PR	IR	FT	Total
1	Željko Štulec	(Croatia) Zagreb	—	6	2	8
2	Enea Jaupi	San Marino	4	2	—	6
3	Oleksandr Bozhenko	(Ukraine) FC Inhulets	—	3	2	5
4	Roberto García Puente	(Spain) Castile and León	—	0	4	4
4	Eoin Hayes	(Republic of Ireland) Munster/Connacht	—	1	3	4
4	David Kneale	East West Central Scotland	4	0	—	4
4	Kristijan Lovrić	(Croatia) Zagreb	—	4	0	4
4	Damian Niedojad	(Poland) Lower Silesia	—	4	—	4

Source: UEFA.com
