= List of UEFA Regions' Cup qualifying competitions =

This is a list of all qualifying competitions which are played to decide each national representative in the UEFA Regions' Cup.

Each UEFA member nation has one place in the biennial Regions' Cup, with the competitions in this list being organised by the respective nations' football associations. The winners of each tournament advance to either the preliminary or intermediary round of the Regions' Cup. Smaller members are allowed to submit representative national teams directly into the preliminary round, however.

== Teams ==
Nation	Qualifying competition
Albania	National amateur team
Andorra	National amateur team
Azerbaijan	AFFA Amateur League
Belarus	Belarusian stage of the UEFA Regions' Cup (club team)
Bosnia and Herzegovina	Bosnian stage of the UEFA Regions' Cup
Bulgaria	Regional amateur team
Croatia	Croatian stage of the UEFA Regions' Cup
Czech Republic	Czech stage of the UEFA Regions' Cup
England	FA Inter-League Cup
Estonia	Estonian Small Cup
Finland	Finnish stage of the UEFA Regions' Cup (club team)
France	French stage of the UEFA Regions' Cup
Germany	U21-Länderpokal
Greece	Greek stage of the UEFA Regions' Cup
Hungary	Hungarian stage of the UEFA Regions' Cup
Israel	Liga Alef play-off between eligible clubs
Italy	Trofeo delle Regioni
Kazakhstan	Kazakhstan Second Division
Latvia	Winner of Latvian Second League
Liechtenstein	National amateur team
Lithuania	I Lyga (not necessarily winners, may be chosen by association)
Luxembourg	National amateur team
Macedonia	Regional amateur team
Malta	National amateur team (2000–2010); Gozo representative team (2012–present)
Moldova	Moldovan stage of the UEFA Regions' Cup
Northern Ireland	National junior team (until 2007); East v West Regions Cup Play-off (from 2007)
Poland	Polish stage of the UEFA Regions' Cup
Portugal	Torneio Eusébio das Regiões
Republic of Ireland	Play-off between two regional teams formed among Connacht/Leinster/Munster/Ulster
Romania	Romanian stage of the UEFA Regions' Cup
Russia	Russian Division IV play-offs (region of winning club)
San Marino	National amateur team
Scotland	Regional amateur team
Serbia	Serbian stage of the UEFA Regions' Cup
Slovakia	Slovak stage of the UEFA Regions' Cup
Slovenia	Slovenian stage of the UEFA Regions' Cup
Spain	Spanish stage of the UEFA Regions' Cup
Sweden	Swedish stage of the UEFA Regions' Cup (club team)
Switzerland	Swiss stage of the UEFA Regions' Cup
Turkey	Turkish stage of the UEFA Regions' Cup
Ukraine	National amateur team (1999); AAFU champions/cup holders (2001–2015); UAF (FFU) Regions' Cup (2017–present)
Wales	Welsh stage of the UEFA Regions' Cup

== See also ==
- UEFA Regions' Cup
