= Robin Eriksson =

Swedish footballer

Personal information
- Full name: Bo Robin Eriksson
- Date of birth: 5 January 1991 (age 35)
- Place of birth: Gothenburg, Sweden
- Height: 1.90 m (6 ft 3 in)
- Position: Forward

Youth career
- –2007: Kärra KIF
- 2007–2010: Heerenveen

Senior career*
Years	Team	Apps	(Gls)
2010–2012	Heerenveen	0	(0)
2011	→ BK Häcken (loan)	1	(0)
2012	Kärra KIF	22	(30)
2013	IFK Mariehamn	0	(0)

International career
2007–2008	Sweden U17	7	(2)
2009	Sweden U19	7	(1)
- * Club domestic league appearances and goals as of 17:07, 19 October 2012 (UTC)

Bo Robin Eriksson (born 5 January 1991) is a Swedish footballer who plays as a forward.

Eriksson played for Kärra KIF as a youngster, then moved to the Netherlands as a 16-year-old to join Eredivisie club Heerenveen. Named player of the season in the 2009–10 Eredivisie under-19 league, his career was put on hold when he suffered a broken neck in a car crash. After a lengthy rehabilitation, he returned to Heerenveen's reserves, and spent time on loan at BK Häcken, with whom he played in the 2011 Allsvenskan. Released by Heerenveen, he had trials with Swedish clubs before returning to Kärra KIF in March 2012.

He represented his country at under-17 and under-19 level.

== Career ==
Eriksson was born in Gothenburg, and began his football career with local seventh-tier club Kärra KIF. The 15-year-old Eriksson attracted attention from bigger clubs in the locality, and trained with GAIS, before choosing to join the youth system of Eredivisie club Heerenveen. At 16, he moved to the Netherlands, initially on loan for a year, before the move was made permanent in 2008.

He developed through that club's youth system, and, with his initial contract due to expire in the summer of 2010, signed a new two-year contract with the option of a further year. Eriksson had chosen Heerenveen because of the club's approach to personalised training for development players, and thought of the club as a "warm family", expressing his particular appreciation of how working with coach Jeffrey Talan had improved his strength and stamina.

In 2009–10, he made his first appearances, and scored his first goal, for the club's reserve team, and finished the season as best player in the Eredivisie under-19 league, an honour determined by marks awarded by coaches to the best three opponents in each match. The award was due to be presented before the Johan Cruijff-schaal match in July, but Eriksson was unable to attend. In June, he was driving his girlfriend and a friend when his car was struck by another vehicle, left the road and overturned. His neck was broken, and doctors warned him that he might not walk again, let alone play football. After three months in a neck brace, and a total of nine months' rehabilitation, Eriksson returned to Heerenveen's reserve team.

Eriksson returned to Sweden in September 2011, on loan to BK Häcken, who had been interested in signing him before he went to Heerenveen. In his first game for the reserve side, he missed two chances but was fouled for a penalty, and made his Allsvenskan debut on 23 September as a second-half substitute in a 2–2 draw with local rivals IFK Göteborg. He was an unused substitute for the next game, but played in the reserves for the remainder of the season, and was then released back to Heerenveen.

Heerenveen cancelled his contract in January 2012. After trials with Swedish clubs including Örgryte IS, and still suffering lower back and groin pain which doctors have been unable to relieve, Eriksson returned to Kärra KIF in Division 4. He contributed 30 goals over the 22-game season to Kärra KIF finishing five points clear at the top of the division. On 10 December 2012 the forward, left his club Kärra KIF of the Swedish Football Division 3 and joined to Åland based IFK Mariehamn. He played only four League Cup matches and one Suomen Cup match for Mariehamn, before returned to Sweden in April 2013. He is since the release without a club, but keeps fit with Div 2 Norra Götaland club Nordvärmland FF.

== International career ==
Eriksson's first involvement with Sweden's representative teams came when he was called up for a national training camp as a 15-year-old. He went on to play for his country at under-17 and under-19 level.
