= SHFV =

SHFV may refer to:

- Simian hemorrhagic fever virus.
- Schleswig-Holsteinischer Fussball-Verband, the Schleswig-Holstein Football Association, in Germany.
