= Hamburg Rugby Union =

Sports Union

Hamburg Rugby Club
- Sport: Rugby union
- President: Klaus Merkle

Hamburg Rugby Union (Hamburger Rugby Verband (HHRV)) is the head organization of the rugby teams in and around Hamburg. The HHRV is the professional association in the Hamburg sports federation as well as the national association of the governing body of rugby union in Germany (Deutschen Rugby-Verband (DRV)).

== History ==
=== From the turn of the century until 1925 ===
In the second half of the nineteenth century, enthusiasm for the English football game slowly took hold of German youth. In many cities (such as Stuttgart, Heidelberg and Hannover) the first pioneers began to play football according to the laws of rugby. However, they faced opposition from the outset from members of association football who were in the majority in Hamburg. The first record of rugby activity can be seen as early as the 1880s, which continued right up until the early twentieth century. In 1913, Hamburg Rugby Club competed in a match against Hannover FC in 1897 but lost 3:11. The Hamburg Sports Club (since 1925) and the Hamburg Police Sports Club (SV Polizei) (1924–2005) were the first long-term active clubs that are still active to this day.

=== Up to World War II ===
It was not until the 1935/1936 season that the first regional championship took place. Numerous clubs from Hamburg and other north German cities, such as Wilhelmshaven, Lüneburg and Kiel competed for the then "Nordmarkmeisterschaft". Kiel's navy team was the first title holder. Hamburg's record-holder is FC St. Pauli rugby team, founded in 1933, who held a total of 33 titles from 1937 to 1996.

=== 1945–1960s – the founding years ===
Restarting after World War II was difficult, but with the positive help of many fixtures organised with teams from British occupation troops, the Hamburg Rugby Association could be established in 1952. Until then, rugby was a special division of the Hamburg Football Association. Among the founding members of the new rugby club were numerous clubs from the Hamburg sports scene: FC St.Pauli, Hamburg Rugby Club, HSV, Hamburg Police Sports Club, ASK, ETV, Altona 93, SV St. Georg, Fichte Langenhorn and Uhlenhorster Hockeyclub.

=== Since the 1970s – the formation of the Bundesliga ===
After the introduction of the Bundesliga in 1971, a more structured form of rugby appeared in Germany, during which Hamburg lost its excellence status. FC St. Pauli (1971–1975 and 1988–1990), SV Polizei (1972–1973), HSV (1978–1979) were able to maintain their titles for a short term. FC St. Pauli and Hamburg rugby club have been playing in the first Bundesliga (north) division since the 2012/13 season. Hamburg's women's team has also been successful. St. Pauli's women's team, founded in 1989, has won eight championships since 1995. More than 20 national players have since emerged from this team. In addition, the club is the only club in Germany to establish an U16 girls' team. Combined with FC St. Pauli (with around 600 members), Hamburg rugby is home to Germany's largest rugby club.

In 2006 the club reached another milestone: Hamburg rugby club gained the sole rights of use of the Hamburg Rugby Arena. With the deal of the rugby arena finalized, the Hamburg rugby organization, along with its affiliated clubs, went on to organize the athletic and administrative processes in the arena on Saarlandstraße in Hamburg Stadtpark. After further negotiations with the city of Hamburg, Hamburg rugby club was pleased to announce that the rugby pitch in Barmwisch, Hamburg- Bramfeld and the training ground 'Am Bären' at the Südring in Hamburg's Stadtpark was available for its members use.

After more than 44 years, the Hamburg Rugby organization set up a national match between Germany and Sweden on 6 April 2013, giving more than 3,500 spectators a glimpse of the potential successes of German rugby. In the same year there was an international youth meeting in Israel between the U18 selection of the Hamburg rugby club and the Kibbutz Yizre'el Rugby Club, which the Hamburg senate subsidized. Likewise, the senate was more than happy to support the men's and youth team's visits to Hansestadt in 2005, 2008 and 2012.

== Organization and structure ==
=== Members ===
The club had approximately 1180 members across 10 different teams. (2015)

Club	Postcode	Location
FC Sankt Pauli	20359	Hamburg
VfL Jesteburg Wombats	21224	Rosengarten
Hamburger SV	22525	Hamburg
Hamburger RC	22083	Hamburg
Hamburg Exiles RFC	22397	Hamburg
SC Varel	26316	Varel
TSV Karlshöfen	27442	Gnarrenburg
Old Boys Hamburg	22393	Hamburg
Eimsbütteler Koalas (from Eimsbütteler TV)	20144	Hamburg
Heidgrabener SV	25436	Heidgraben

=== Committee ===
- 1. President: Klaus Merkle, Hamburg Exiles RFC
- 2. President: Ralph Paukstat, FC St Pauli
- 3. Club Secretary: Horst Jahnke, Old Boys Hamburg
- 4. Treasurer: Aiko Böhm, Hamburg Exiles RFC
- 5. Youth Officer: Marco Schünemann, FC St Pauli
- 6. Coach: Friedrich Michau, FC St Pauli
- 7. Team manager: Dietmar Scharmann, Hamburger Rugby-Club
- 8. Representative for women's rugby: Sabine Schubert, FC St Pauli
- 9. Public relations: Timo Linck, Hamburg Exiles RFC

== Record ==
=== Rugby union ===
Tier	Name of Division	Place	Club
1	Bundesliga	2nd	FC St. Pauli, Hamburger RC
2	Women's Bundesliga	1st	FC St Pauli
3	Regional League North	3rd	FC St. Pauli II, Hamburg Exiles RFC, SC Varel
4	Club League	3rd	Hamburger RC II, Hamburger SV, FC St. Pauli III
5	Youth League	4th	Heidgrabener SV, FC St. Pauli, Hamburger RC, Eimsbütteler TV

=== 7's League ===
Name of Division	Place	Club
German 7's Women's League North	1st	FC St. Pauli

== Events ==
=== Holiday activities for children ===
Hamburg's rugby organization has been coordinating a rugby holiday camp in Hamburg StadtPark since 2011 as part of Hansestadt's holiday campaign. During the 2014 summer holidays, over 70 children took part. Some representatives of Hamburg rugby club were also responsible for organizing the "Sport Rallye" for the 100th anniversary of Hamburg Stadtpark. This was organised together with the Stadtpark, the Administration for Urban Development and the Environment (BSU), the Hamburg sports office and other surrounding associations.
