= St. Dumitru Church (Orhei) =

- Biserica Sf Dumitru
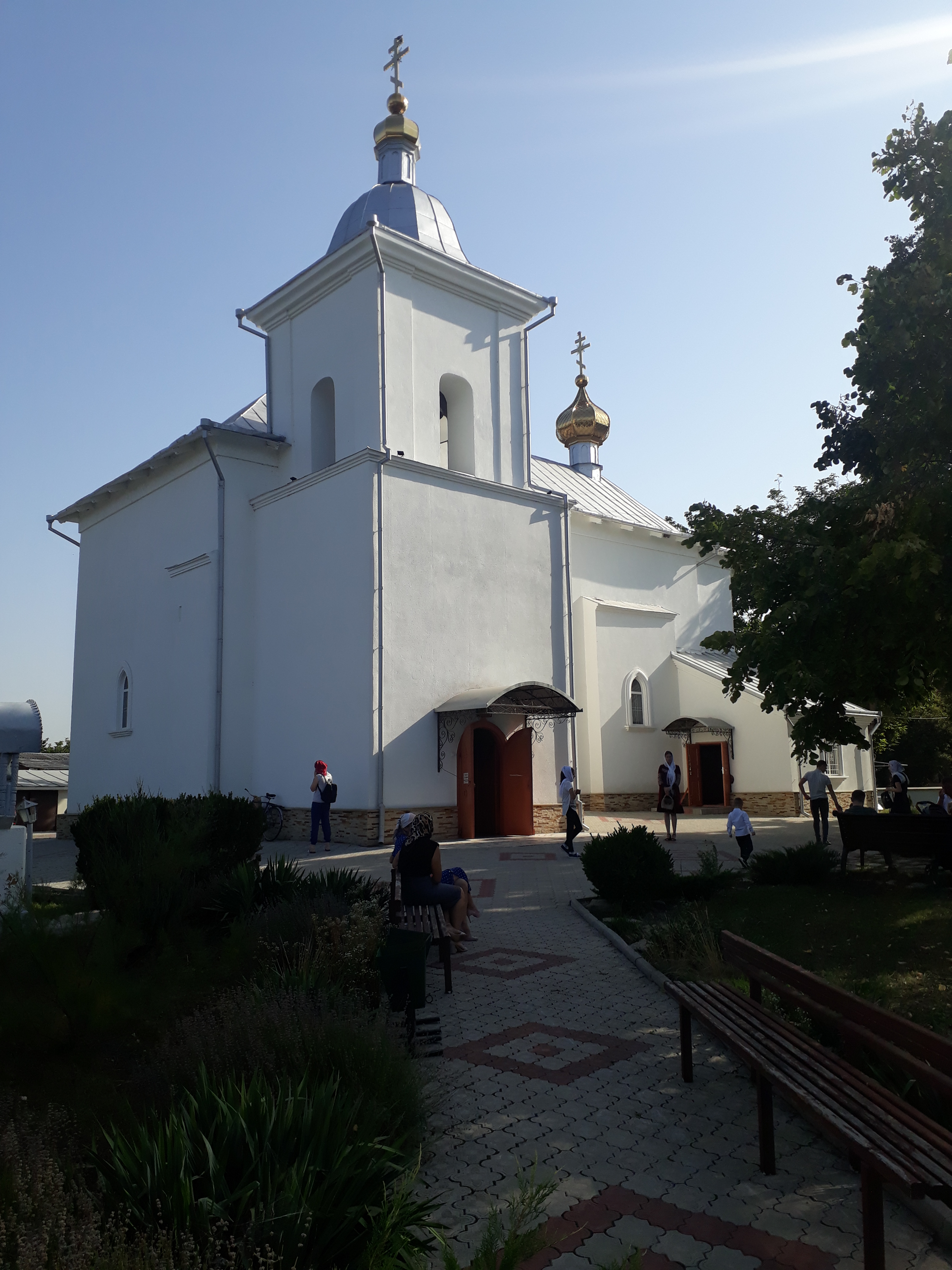
- St. Dumitru Church
- 47°22′15″N 28°49′5″E
- Location: Orhei
- Country: Moldova
- Denomination: Eastern Orthodoxy

History
- Status: Church
- Founder: Vasile Lupu
- Consecrated: 1637

Architecture
- Style: Byzantine Style
- Groundbreaking: 1632
- Completed: 1636

The St. Dumitru Church (Romanian: Biserica Sf. Dumitru) is a church in Orhei, Moldova.
