= Northern German Football Association =

Regional association of the German Football Association

- Formation: 1905 1948 (reformed)
- Type: Football association
- Location: Bremen, Germany
- Members: 1,052,406 (2017)
- President: Eugen Gehlenborg
- Parent organization: German Football Association
- Affiliations: Bremen Football Association; Hamburg Football Association; Lower Saxony Football Association; Schleswig-Holstein Football Association
- Website: www.nordfv.de

The Northern German Football Association (German: Norddeutscher Fußball-Verband; NFV) is one of the five regional associations of the German Football Association (German: Deutscher Fußball-Bund; DFB) and covers the four German states of Bremen, Hamburg, Lower Saxony and Schleswig-Holstein.

== Structure ==
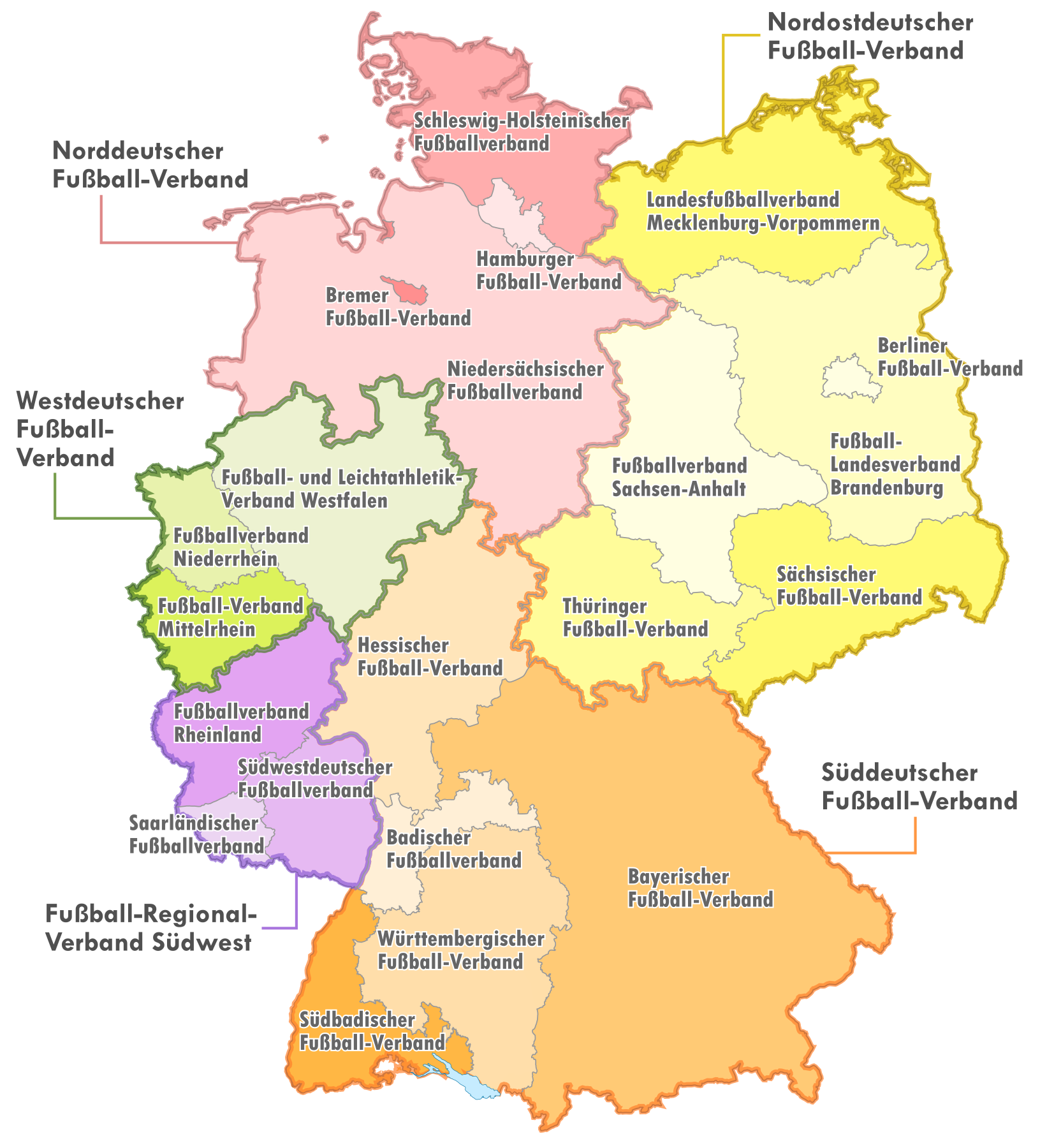
DFB, its five regional and 21 state associations

In 2017, the NFV had 1,052,406 members, 3,800 member clubs and 27,686 teams playing in all its men, women and junior league systems. Since the 2012–13 season, at the top of the NFV men's league system sits the Regionalliga Nord, a level four division in the German football league system.

The NFV itself is formed by the following state associations:

- Bremen Football Association (German: Bremer Fußball-Verband; BFV)
- Hamburg Football Association (German: Hamburger Fußball-Verband; HFV)
- Lower Saxony Football Association (German: Niedersächsischer Fußball-Verband; NFV)
- Schleswig-Holstein Football Association (German: Schleswig-Holsteinischer Fußball-Verband; SHFV)

== History ==
The NFV was founded in 1905 as a merger of several local football associations in Northern Germany and used to administer the Northern German football championship for the next decades. In 1933, the association along with all other regional associations was disbanded by the Nazi government, with all German football competitions now organized by the Reich. Soon after World War II, football competitions in Northern Germany typically restarted on an informal basis, with the NFV officially reintroduced in 1948. Until 1963, the NFV had the jurisdiction on the Oberliga Nord, the regional division of the former lop level German Oberliga. After the introduction of the Bundesliga in 1963, the NFV league system became a feeder to the nationwide divisions.
