= Kärra-Rödbo =

Borough of Gothenburg, Sweden

Kärra-Rödbo is one of the 21 boroughs of Gothenburg, Sweden. It is located in the northern part of the Hisingen island and has an area of 3 481 hectares, with about 11,000 inhabitants (2004).

== Sports ==
The following sports clubs are located in Hisings Kärra:

- Kärra KIF
