= Lower Saxony Football Association =

Governing body of association football in Lower Saxony

- Formation: 3 July 1947
- Type: Football association
- Headquarters: Schillerstraße 4
- Location: Barsinghausen, Lower Saxony
- Members: 642,556 (2017)
- President: Karl Rothmund
- Parent organization: German Football Association
- Website: www.nfv.de

The Lower Saxony Football Association (German: Niedersächsischer Fussball-Verband), the NFV, is one of 21 state organisations of the German Football Association, the DFB, and covers the state of Lower Saxony.

== Overview ==
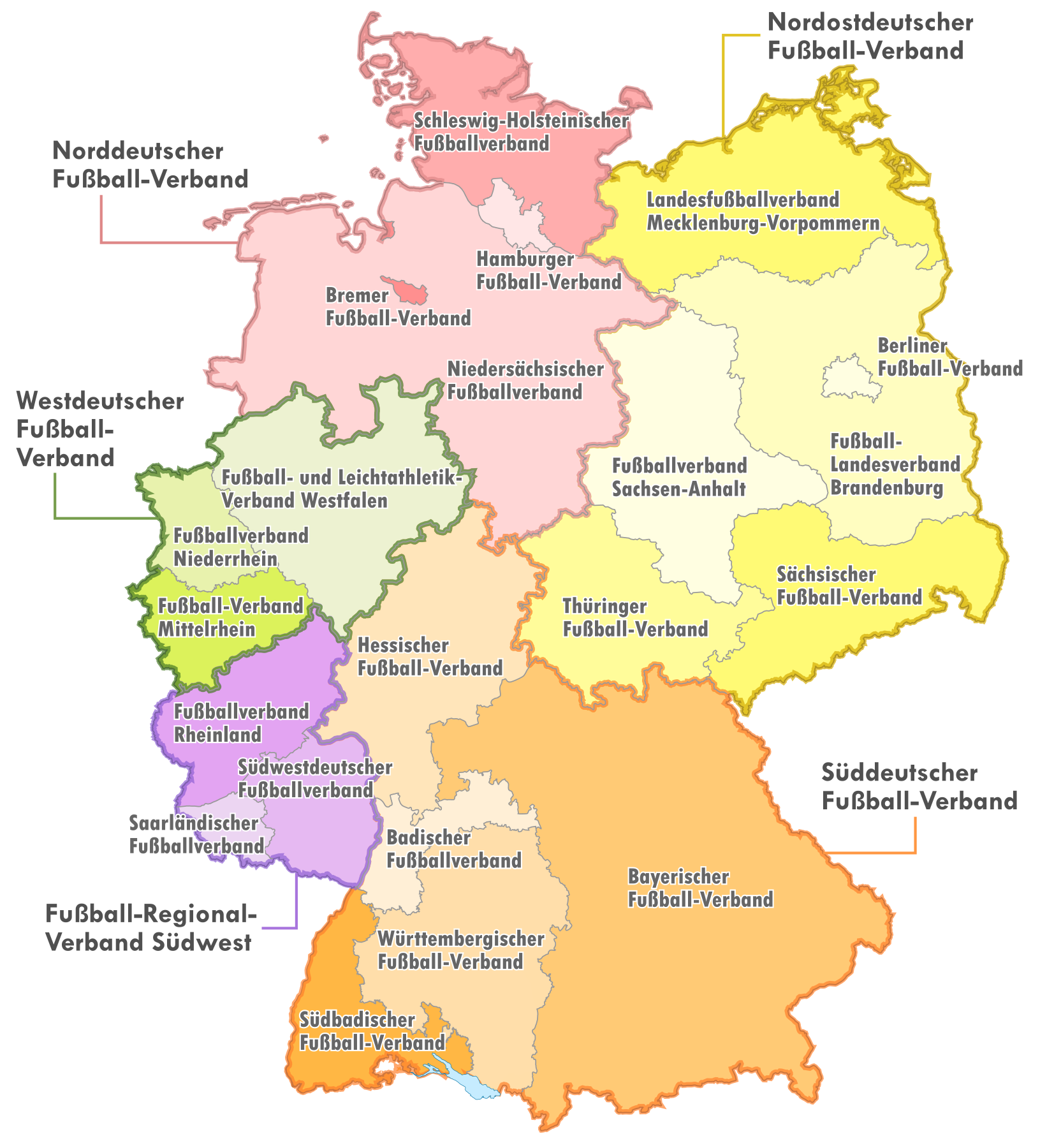
DFB, its five regional and 21 state associations

The NFV is also part of the Northern German Football Association, one of five regional federations in Germany. The other members of the regional association are the Bremen Football Association, the Hamburg Football Association and the Schleswig-Holstein Football Association.

In 2017, the NFV had 642,556 members, 2,661 member clubs and 17,975 teams playing in its league system. It is the third-largest of the German state associations.
