= FA Inter-League Cup =

- Founded: 2003
- Region: England; Isle of Man; Guernsey; Jersey
- Current champions: Cheshire Football League
- Website: FA Inter-League Cup

The FA Inter-League Cup (formerly known as the FA National League System Cup or FA NLS Cup) is a football competition run by The Football Association. It was created in the 2003–04 season to provide an English representative in the UEFA Regions' Cup.

== History ==
In previous Regions' Cups, the FA had nominated a team to take part; in the 2002–03 season it was a Kent County League XI. UEFA decreed that in the future all Regions' Cup entrants must have won a national competition, and so the NLS Cup was formed.

The cup is contested by representative sides from leagues at Step 7 of the National League System, with a few other leagues permitted by the FA. That is roughly at the county level or eleventh overall tier of the English football league system. The first final was held on 8 May 2004, and was won by the Mid Cheshire League, who beat the Cambridgeshire County League 2–0.

The second final was held on 7 May 2006 at Cambridge United's Abbey Stadium, and saw the Cambridgeshire County League and Isle of Man Football League compete. The Isle of Man comfortably won the fixture with four goals in the second half and claimed the trophy with a final score of 4–0. The team travelled to the Czech Republic in April 2007 for the Intermediary Round of the UEFA Regions' Cup. After a 1–2 defeat to the Bratislava team (Slovakia) a 3–2 win over the hosting Hradec Králové team left the side with a chance of qualifying for the finals. Unfortunately a 0–1 loss to Northern Ireland's Eastern Region ended their hopes.

The 2008 final was held at Coventry City's Ricoh Arena on Saturday 3 May. The Southern Amateur League won the competition at the first attempt after winning a penalty shoot-out 4–2 following a 1–1 draw. The SAL team travelled to Turin in October 2008 for the Intermediary Round of the UEFA Regions' Cup where they took on representatives from Italy, Scotland and the Republic of Ireland. The team finished second on goal difference, having not conceded any goals in their 3 group matches.

The 2010 final was held at The Track in Saint Sampson, Guernsey on 1 May 2010. The home side, the Guernsey Senior County League, defeated the Liverpool County Premier League 5–2. It was announced in November 2010 that the competition would be renamed from the "FA National League System Cup" to its present name.

The 2018 final was between York Football League and North Riding Football League on Sunday 6 May at the home of Sheffield United - Bramall Lane. North Riding Football League won 4-2.

Due to the COVID-19 pandemic the 2020 final was postponed. The final was between Jersey Football Combination and West Cheshire League on Monday 10 May 2021 at St George's Park National Football Centre. Jersey Football Combination won 5-1. This qualified Jersey for the 2023 UEFA Regions' Cup.

The competition returned in 2024, with the final taking place on Sunday 5th May 2024 between the Arthurian League and West Yorkshire Association Football League at Lincoln City FC's Sincil Bank Stadium. The Arthurian League won the final 1 - 0 after extra time and will now represent England at the 2024/25 UEFA Regions Cup.

== Finals ==
Season	Winners	Score	Runners-up	Venue	Qualification for
2003–04	Mid-Cheshire Association Football League	2 – 0	Cambridgeshire County League	Abbey Stadium	2005 UEFA Regions' Cup
2005–06	Isle of Man League	4 – 0	Cambridgeshire County League	Abbey Stadium	2007 UEFA Regions' Cup
2007–08	Southern Amateur League	1 – 1†	Midland Football Combination	Ricoh Arena	2009 UEFA Regions' Cup
2009–10	Priaulx League	5 – 2	Liverpool County Premier League	The Track	2011 UEFA Regions' Cup
2011–12	Jersey Football Combination	2 – 1‡	Isle of Man Football League	The Bowl	2013 UEFA Regions' Cup
2013–14	Isle of Man Football League	3 – 2	Hertfordshire Senior County League	The Bowl	2015 UEFA Regions' Cup
2015–16	West Yorkshire League	3 – 2	Teesside League	Bootham Crescent	2017 UEFA Regions' Cup
2017–18	North Riding Football League	4 – 2	York League	Bramall Lane	2019 UEFA Regions' Cup
2019–20	Jersey Football Combination	5 – 1	West Cheshire League	St George's Park National Football Centre	2023 UEFA Regions' Cup
2023–24	Arthurian League	1 – 0 ‡	West Yorkshire Association Football League	Sincil Bank	2025 UEFA Regions' Cup
2025–26	Cheshire Football League	3 – 1	Herts Senior County Football League	King Power Stadium	2027 UEFA Regions' Cup

† – After penalties ‡ – After extra time

== See also ==
- Trofeo delle Regioni (football)
- Polish stage of the UEFA Regions' Cup
- Spanish stage of the UEFA Regions' Cup
