= North-West F.A. =

The North-West Football Association, abbreviated to the NWFA, or the NWIFA, commonly referred to as the North-West F.A., is one of the four regional football associations affiliated with the Irish Football Association (IFA) in Northern Ireland. The other three associations covering the country are the County Antrim & District FA, Mid-Ulster F.A., and the Fermanagh & Western FA.

The NWIFA currently has an affiliation base of over 80 member clubs, which includes eight women's teams. The biggest competition that the North-West Football Association govern is the North West Senior Cup. It was founded in 1886, originally known as the County Londonderry F.A. Cup.

== History ==
The North-West Football Association was established in 1885 as one of the four Northern Ireland football governing bodies. They organized their first competition, the County Londonderry F.A. Cup. The inaugural winners are Limavady F.C., beating St Columb's Court F.C. 5-0. In 1892, the County Londonderry F.A. Cup was renamed to the North West Cup.

The North-West Football Association then established a second cup competition known as the North West City Cup.

In 1980, the North-West F.A. founded the Craig Memorial Cup. It was created to acknowledge the legacy E.H. Craig, a long-term secretary of the association. The competition is known colloquially as the "William Craig Cup" as a misnomer due to the initials being ambiguity of the honoree's initials. The inaugural winners are Tobermore United.

In 1981, the NWFA renamed the North West City Cup in memory of Matt Morrison, a long-standing figure in the North-West region. It is known as the Matt Morrison Memorial Cup.

In November 2025, the North West Football Association celebrated their 140th anniversary at the White Horse Hotel, Derry. Attendees included IFA President Conrad Kirkwood and politician Gregory Campbell and Maurice Bradley.

== Competitions ==
- North West Senior Cup (founded 1886 originally named the County Londonderry F.A. Cup)
- Craig Memorial Cup (founded 1927)
- Matt Morrison Memorial Cup (founded 1920s)
- Coleraine and District League (founded 1906)
- North West Junior League (founded in the early 20th century)

== Council and committee ==
The Association's business is managed by a council composed of representatives from senior, intermediate, junior, and women's football. They nominate six members to represent the NWFA in the Irish Football Association Council. The council also select an annual committee for the following bodies:

- Senior/Intermediate Cup Committee
- Junior Committee
- Disciplinary Committee

This is a list of the current North-West Football Association committee:

- President: Raymond Kennedy
- Honorary President: Jackie Morrison
- Chairman: Wayne Glenn
- Vice-President: Jerry Stewart
- Vice-Chairman: Dessie Bradley
- Treasurer: Charles Johnston
- Secretary: Jonathan McCunn
- Assistant Secretary: Andrew Milla
