= Bremen Football Association =

- Formation: 2 August 1946
- Type: Football association
- Headquarters: Franz-Böhmert-Strasse 1 b
- Location: Bremen
- Members: 44,066 (2017)
- President: Björn Fecker
- Parent organization: German Football Association
- Website: www.bremerfv.de

The Bremen Football Association (German: Bremer Fussball-Verband), the BFV, is one of 21 state organisations of the German Football Association, the DFB, and covers the state of Bremen.

== Overview ==
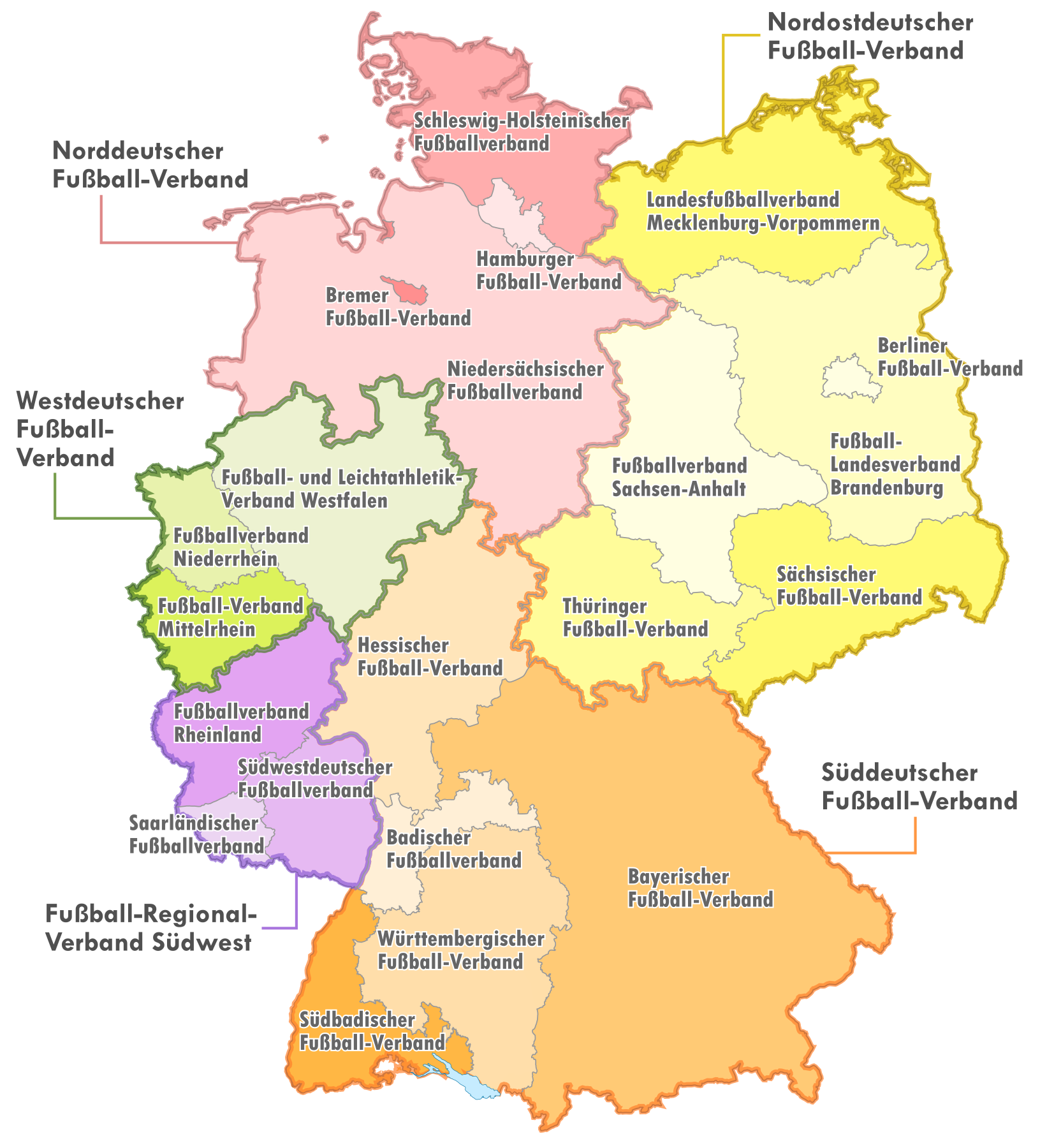
DFB, its five regional and 21 state associations

The BFV is also part of the Northern German Football Association, one of five regional federations in Germany. The other members of the regional association are the Hamburg Football Association, the Lower Saxony Football Association and the Schleswig-Holstein Football Association.

In 2017, the BFV had 44,066 members, 85 member clubs and 1,294 teams playing in its league system. It is the smallest of the 21 state associations in Germany.
