= Polish stage of the UEFA Regions' Cup =

The Polish stage of the UEFA Regions' Cup is the Polish football tournament for amateur teams who represent the Polish regions. It has been played since 1999 as qualification for the UEFA Regions' Cup.

== Champions ==
1999 - Małopolska (Lesser Poland)
2000/01 - Mazowsze (Masovia)
2002/03 - Małopolska (Lesser Poland)
2004/05 - Małopolska (Lesser Poland)
2006/07 - Dolny Śląsk (Lower Silesia)
2008/09 - Wielkopolska (Greater Poland)
2017/18 - Dolny Śląsk (Lower Silesia)

== See also ==
- FA Inter-League Cup
- UEFA Regions' Cup
- Spanish stage of the UEFA Regions' Cup
- Trofeo delle Regioni (football)
