= Turkish stage of the UEFA Regions' Cup =

- Country: Turkey
- Confederation: Europe (UEFA)
- International cup(s): UEFA Regions' Cup
- Current champions: Kayseri
- Current: 2022 Turkish stage of the UEFA Regions' Cup

The Turkish stage of the UEFA Region's Cup (Turkish: Türkiye Bölge Karmaları Birinciliği) is a Turkish football tournament for amateur teams which represent the Turkish regions. Its winner qualifies for the next UEFA Regions' Cup, played the following year.

== History ==
In 2022, Kayseri won the tournament.

== Finals ==
Years	Final host	Final			Third place game or losing semi-finalists (Note: If no third place match was played; losing semi-finalists are listed in alphabetical order.)		
Years	Final host	Winner	Score	Runner-up	Third place game or losing semi-finalists		
2010	Konya	Ankara	3–0	Samsun	Adana and Istanbul		
2012	Kayseri	Istanbul	1–1 (5–3 p)	Ankara	Samsun	2–0	Bursa
2014	Nevşehir	Ankara	1–0	Kayseri	Antalya and Samsun		
2016	Afyonkarahisar	Istanbul	1–0	Ankara	Adana and Sakarya		
2018	Erzurum	Istanbul	2–0	Diyarbakır	Antalya and Kayseri		
2020	Not played						
2022	Erzurum	Kayseri	1–1 (6–5 p)	Sakarya	Diyarbakır and Trabzon		
2024	Erzurum	Istanbul	3–2	Bursa			

== See also ==
- UEFA Regions' Cup
- List of UEFA Regions' Cup qualifying competitions
