= Orhei =

- Municipality
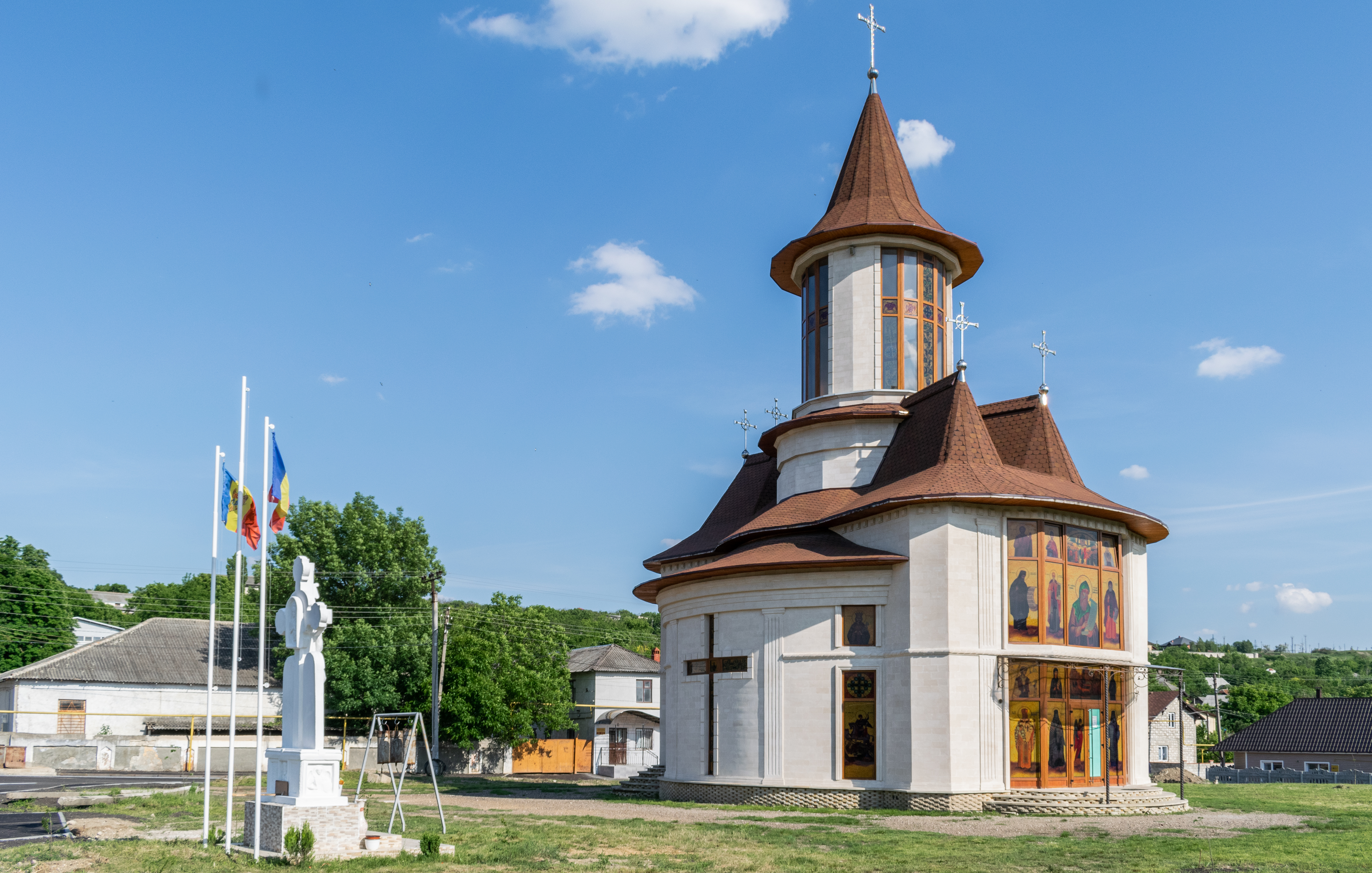
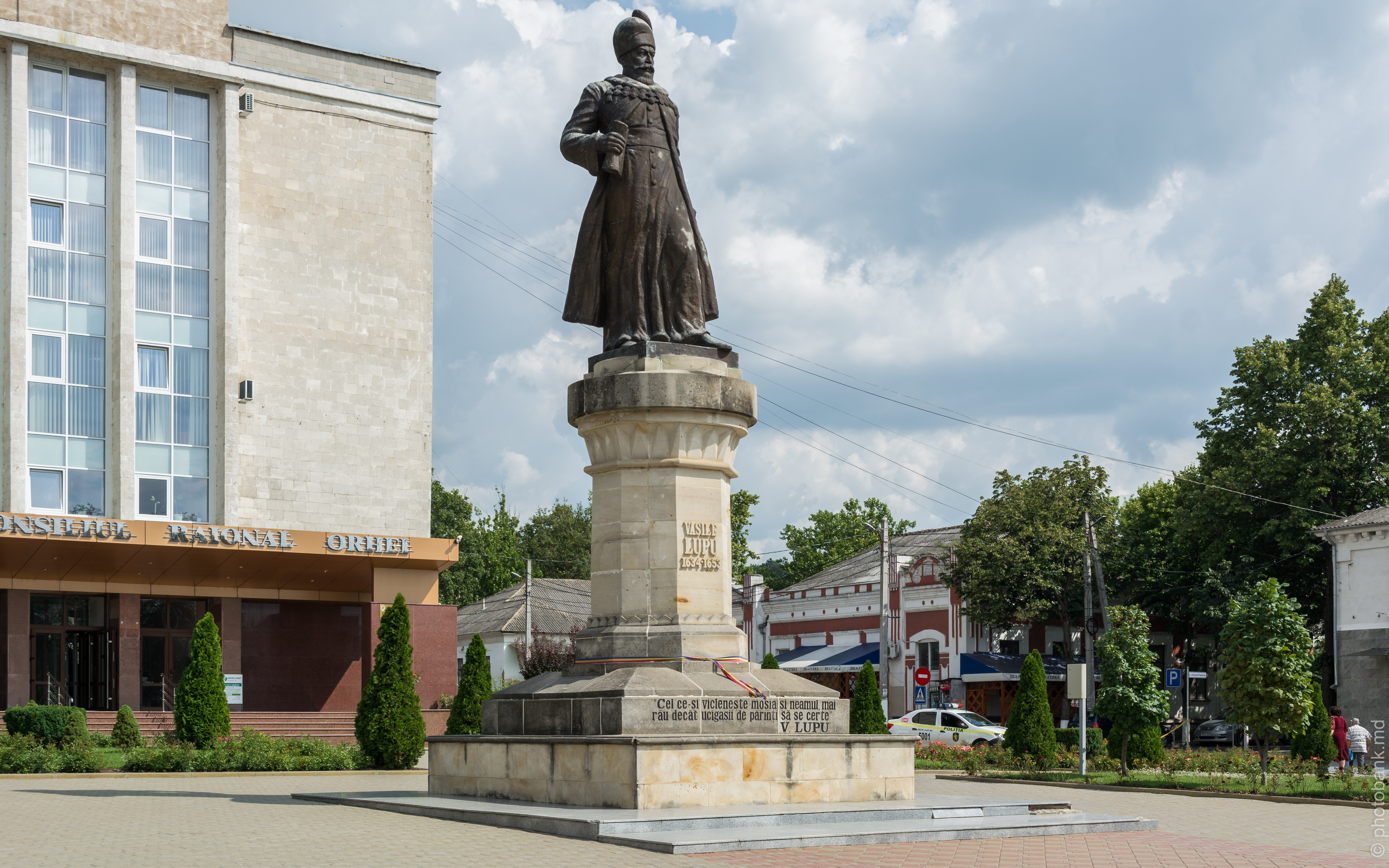
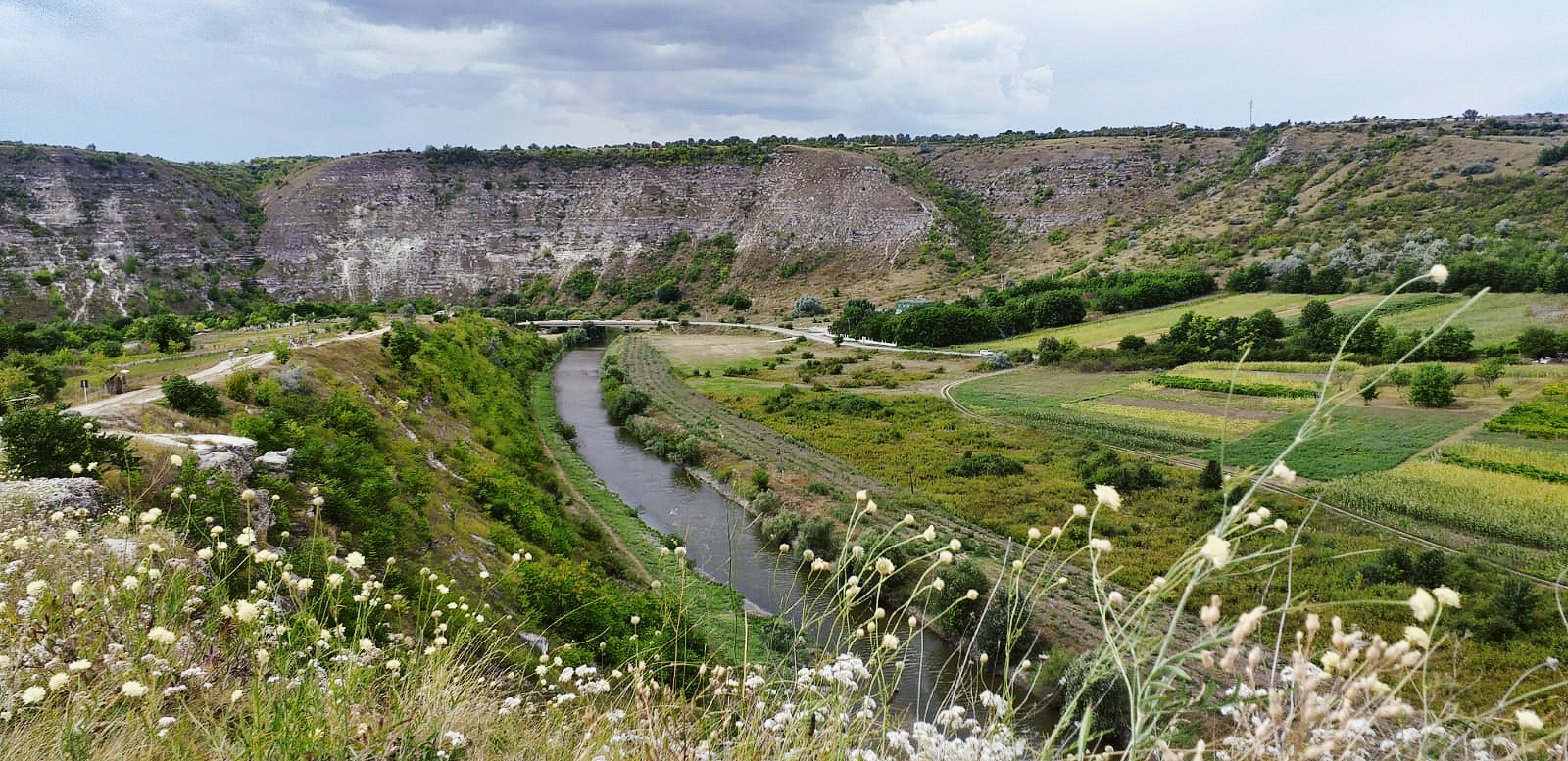
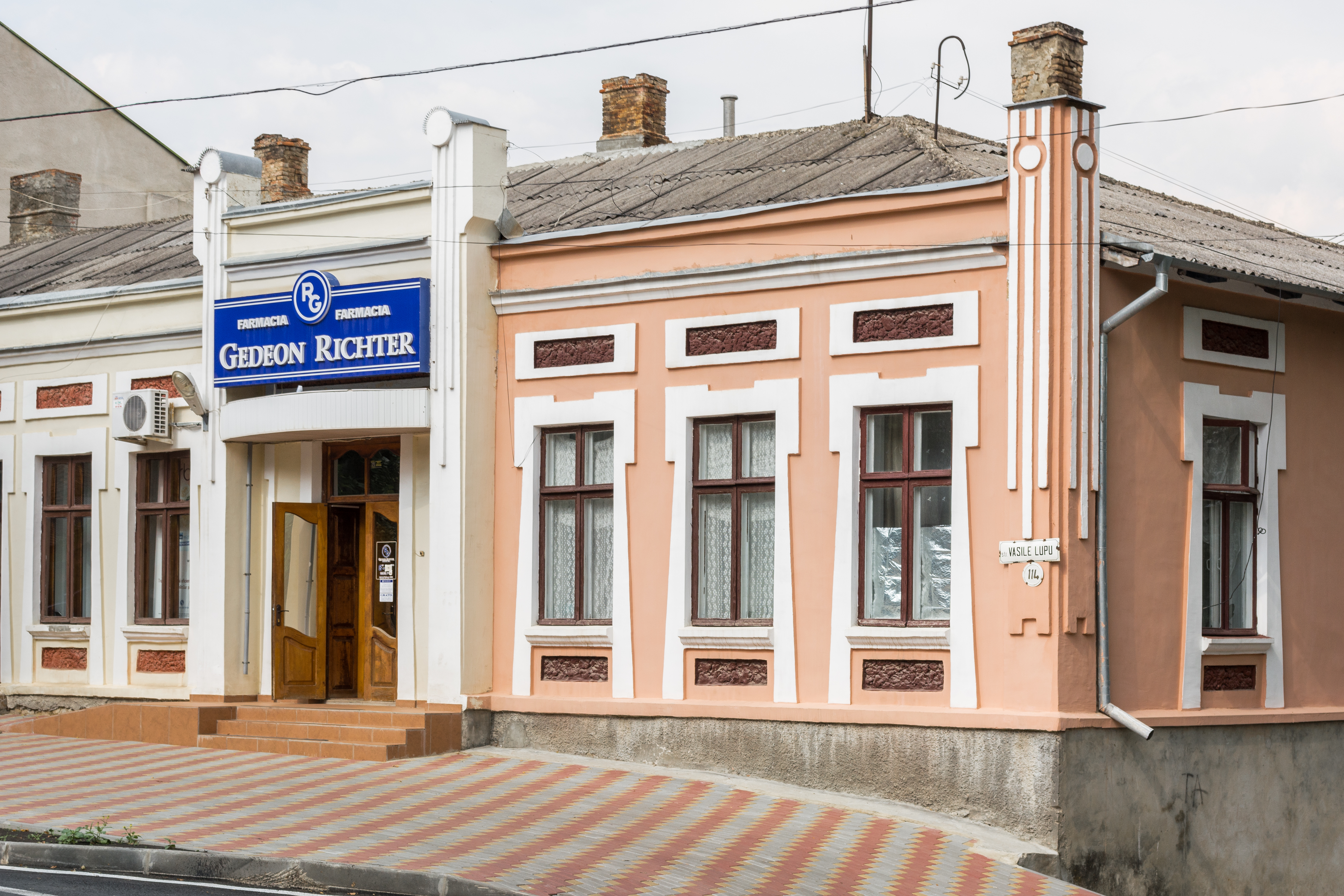
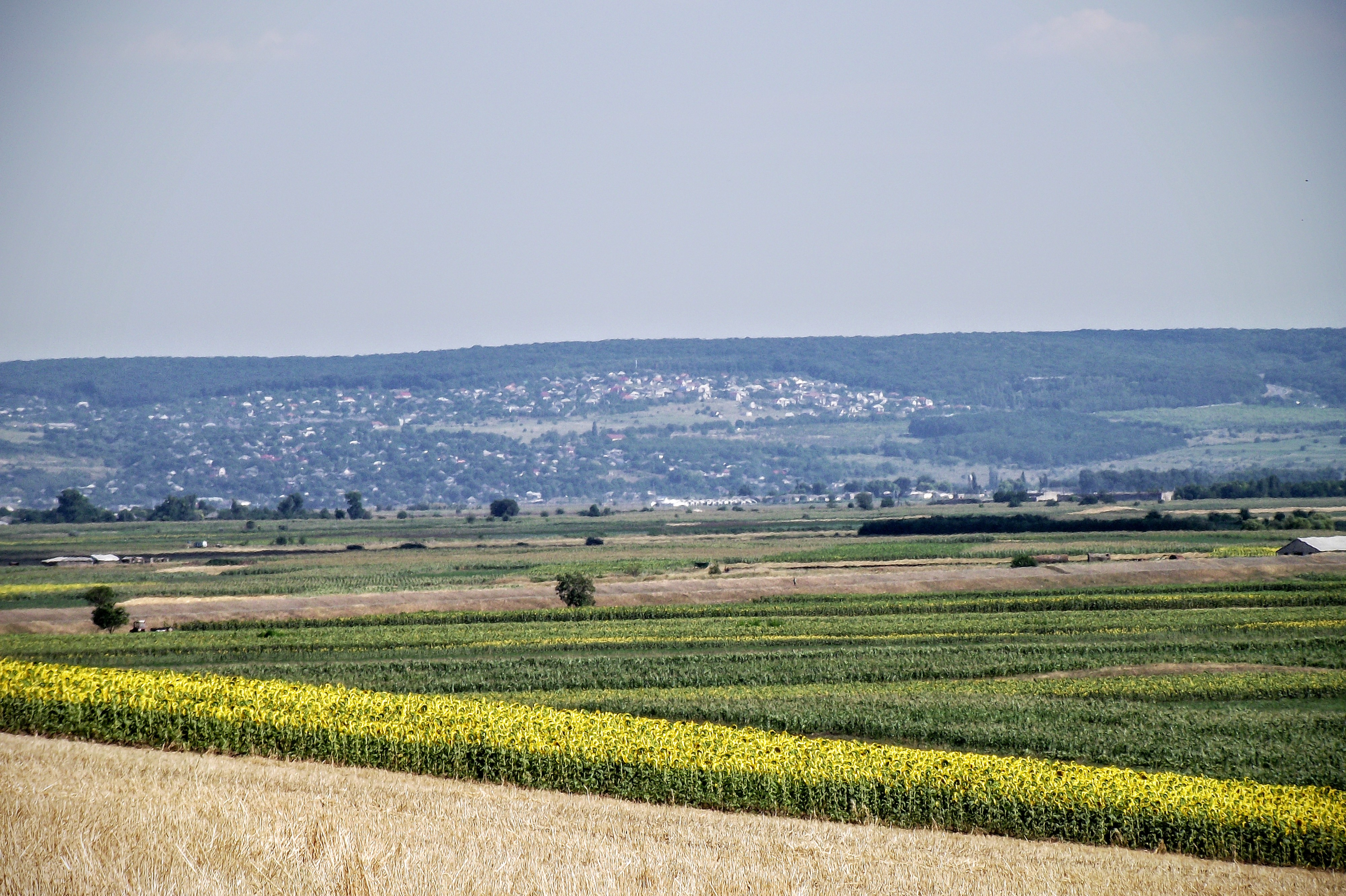

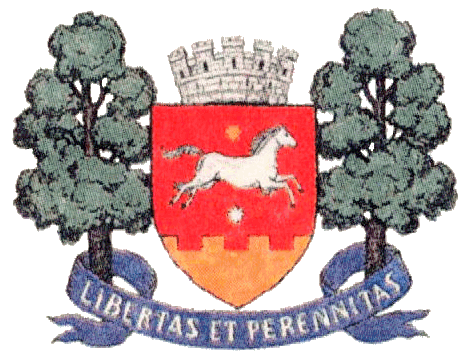
- Flag Coat of arms

- Location within Moldova
- Coordinates: 47°23′N 28°49′E
- Country: Moldova
- County: Orhei District

Government
  - Mayor: Tatiana Cociu (FASM)

Area
  - Total: 8.5 km^{2} (3.3 sq mi)

Population (2024)
  - Total: 22,183
  - Density: 2,600/km^{2} (6,800/sq mi)
- Time zone: UTC+2 (EET)
  - Summer (DST): UTC+3 (EEST)
- Postal code: 3505
- Website: Official website

Orhei (Romanian pronunciation: [orˈhej]) is a city, municipality and the administrative centre of Orhei District in the Republic of Moldova, with a population of 22,183. It lies roughly 40 kilometres (25 miles) north of the capital, Chișinău.

== History ==
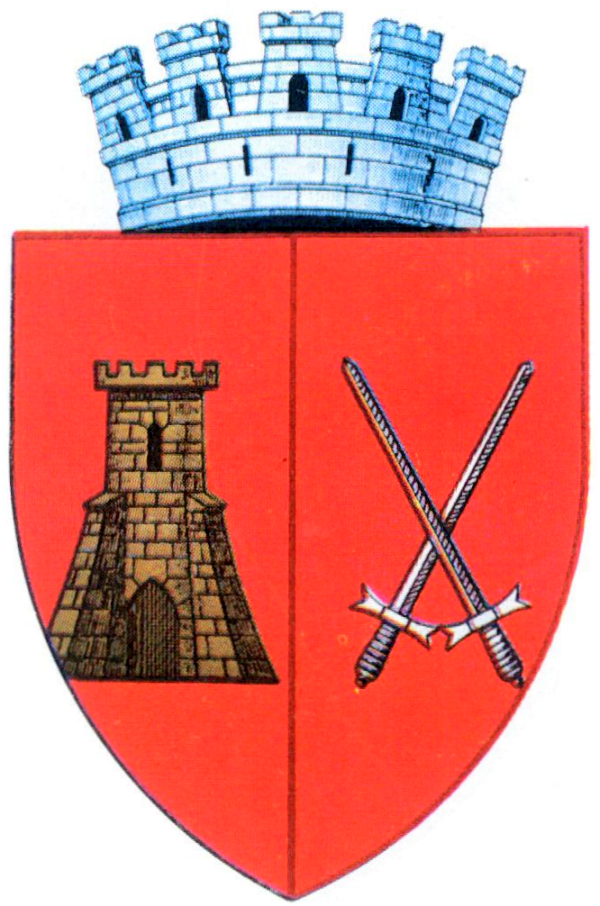
Interwar Coat of Arms of Orhei

Orhei is believed to derive its name from the Hungarian word Őrhely, meaning “guard post” or “lookout post,” and could be linked to a Hungarian army outpost guarding the gyepű. Locally, orhei was understood to mean “strengthened hill,” “fortress,” or “deserted courtyard.” The town historically served as an important defensive outpost on Moldavia’s eastern border.

In the 14th century, the Crimean Tatars established a settlement at Orheiul Vechi (Old Orhei), constructing baths, mosques, and other buildings, leaving a lasting cultural influence. By the early 15th century, the area was incorporated into the Moldavian principality, and Orhei gradually shifted to its present location, with the first documented mention in 1554 during the reign of Alexandru Lăpușneanu.

After centuries under Moldavian rule, Orhei was ceded to the Russian Empire in 1812 following the Russo-Turkish wars. Like the rest of Bessarabia, it became part of the Kingdom of Romania after World War I, was annexed by the Soviet Union in 1940, briefly recaptured by Romania in 1941, and re-occupied by the USSR in 1944 during the Uman–Botoșani offensive. After World War II, the town was rebuilt, and in 1991 it became part of the Republic of Moldova.

Before 2003, Orhei served as the capital of Orhei County, a large administrative region, until the country was reorganized into smaller raions (districts).

The St. Dumitru Church, constructed by Vasile Lupu, is located in the town. Lupu, who ruled from 1634 to 1653, is credited with ushering in the town's so-called golden age, and a statue in the central square honors his legacy.

Orhei has gained national and international attention as a political stronghold of fugitive Moldovan oligarch Ilan Shor. Since his election as mayor in 2015, Shor built a network of local support that has enabled his influence to endure even after he fled the country amid criminal investigations. His preferred candidates, such as Pavel Verejanu in the 2019 mayoral election, have continued to secure dominant victories in the city, often with overwhelming majorities.

== Demographics ==
According to the 2024 census, 22,183 inhabitants lived in Orhei (making it the ninth largest city in Moldova), an increase compared to the previous census in 2014, when 21,065 inhabitants were registered.

Ethnic composition of Orhei (2024)
1. Moldovans (Note: There is an ongoing controversy regarding the ethnic identification of Moldovans and Romanians.) (86.0%)
2. Romanians (9.20%)
3. Ukrainians (1.90%)
4. Russians (1.70%)
5. Others (1.00%)
Linguistic composition of Orhei (2024)
1. Moldovan (Note: In March 2023, the Parliament of Moldova passed a law updating all legislative texts and the constitution to refer to the national language as Romanian, effectively rendering the term "Moldovan" obsolete.) (56.6%)
2. Romanian (36.0%)
3. Russian (5.80%)
4. Ukrainian (1.00%)
5. Other (0.60%)

Historical population
Year	Pop.	±%
1897	12,336	—
1930	15,279	+23.9%
1959	14,131	−7.5%
1970	25,707	+81.9%
1979	30,260	+17.7%
1989	38,038	+25.7%
2004	25,641	−32.6%
2014	21,065	−17.8%
2024	22,183	+5.3%

At the onset of World War I, Orhei's population was estimated at 25,000. About two-thirds of the inhabitants were Jewish, while the remainder consisted primarily of Romanians, with smaller groups of Ruthenians, Russians, and others.

== Religion ==
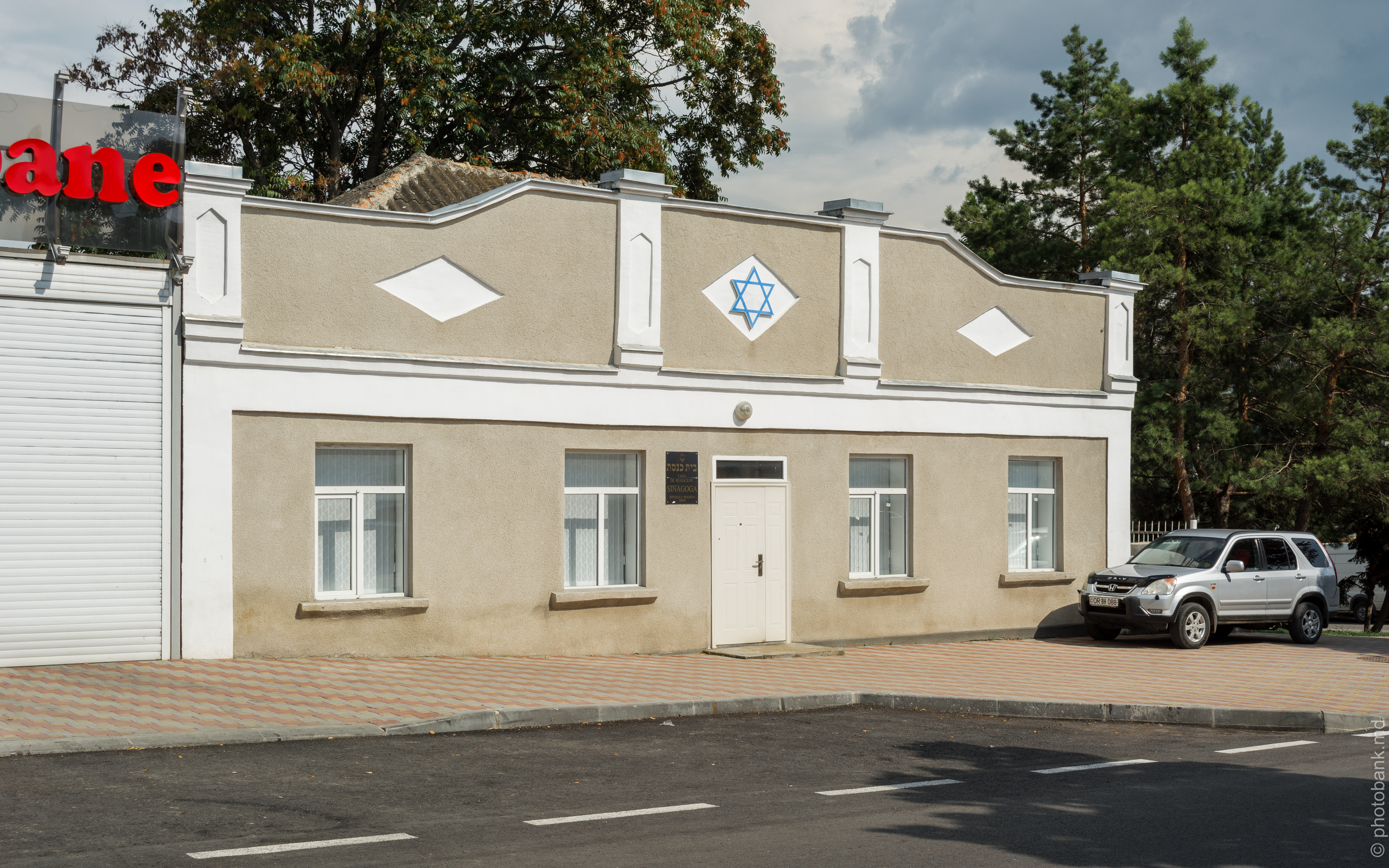
Synagogue

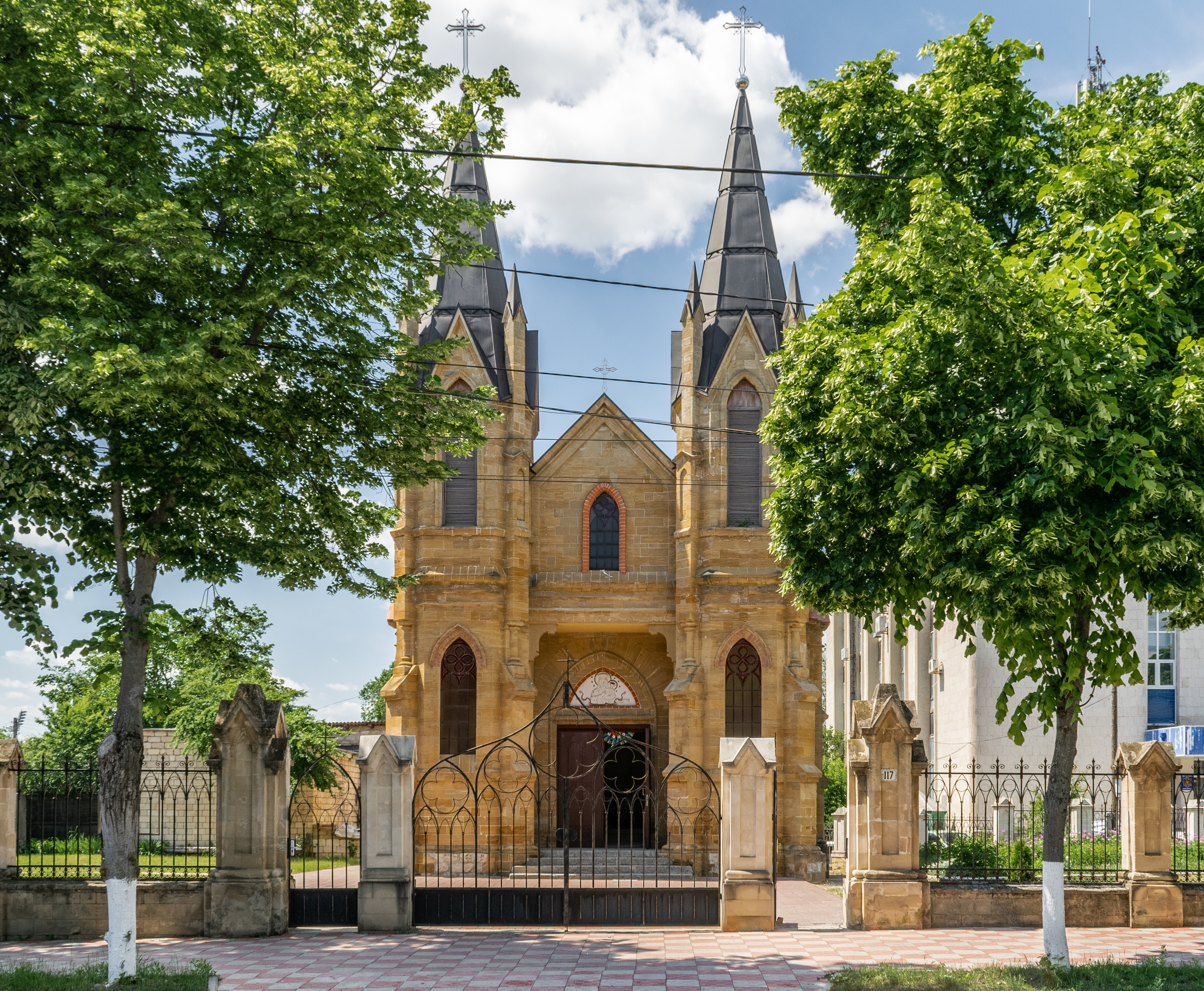
Roman Catholic Cathedral

Orhei was home to many Jews prior to World War II, and has a large Jewish cemetery. Currently, only one synagogue remains active in the community. The primary churches are the Romanian Orthodox Church and the Russian Orthodox Church. The area is also home to congregations of Baptists, Roman Catholics, Seventh-day Adventist Church, the Church of Jesus Christ of Latter-day Saints, the Salvation Army, and Jehovah's Witnesses.

== Economy ==
Orhei was the first place in what was then known as Bessarabia, to have a successful tobacco industry. The area is also known for wine production.

== Sport ==
FC Milsami Orhei is based in the city. The team won the Moldovan National Division in 2015 and 2025.

== Media ==
Orhei has two local radio stations: Radio Orhei (101.6 FM) founded in 2005, contains news from region and republic. In 2018, its name was cloned by a broadcaster affiliated to the Șor Party – Radio Orhei FM (97.5 FM). Radio Orhei FM broadcasts news from the Orhei region, Moldova national news, international news, and Russian, Moldovan, and Romanian music. There is also an Orhei City Hall site.

== Natives ==
- Jacobo Fijman
- Dovid Knut
- Lev Lieberman
- Mihail Maculețchi
- Alex Magala
- Rodica Mahu
- Pasha Parfeny

== International relations ==
=== Twin towns – Sister cities ===
Orhei is twinned with:

- Bicaz, Romania
- Piatra Neamț, Romania

== Gallery ==
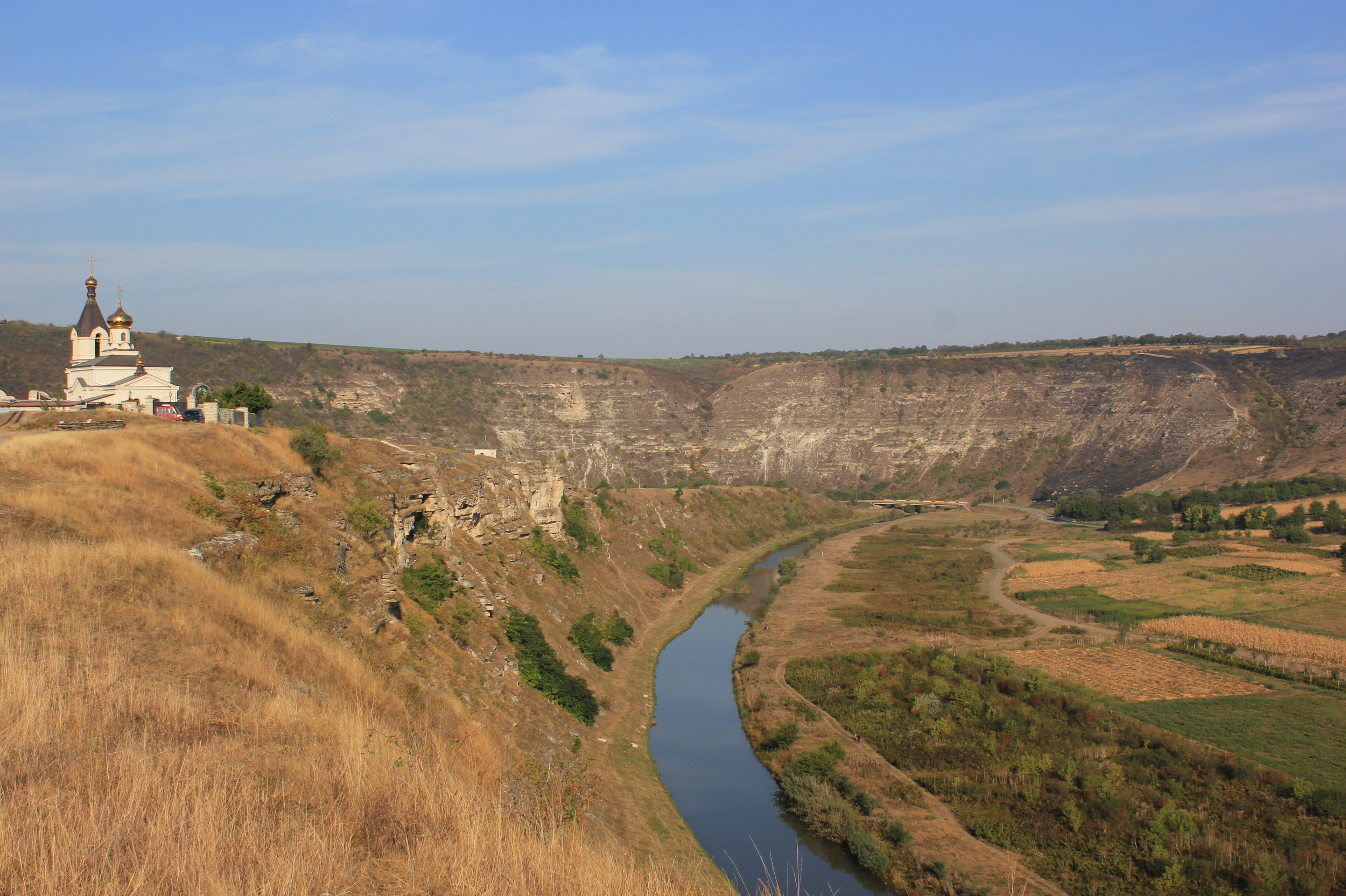
Old Orhei

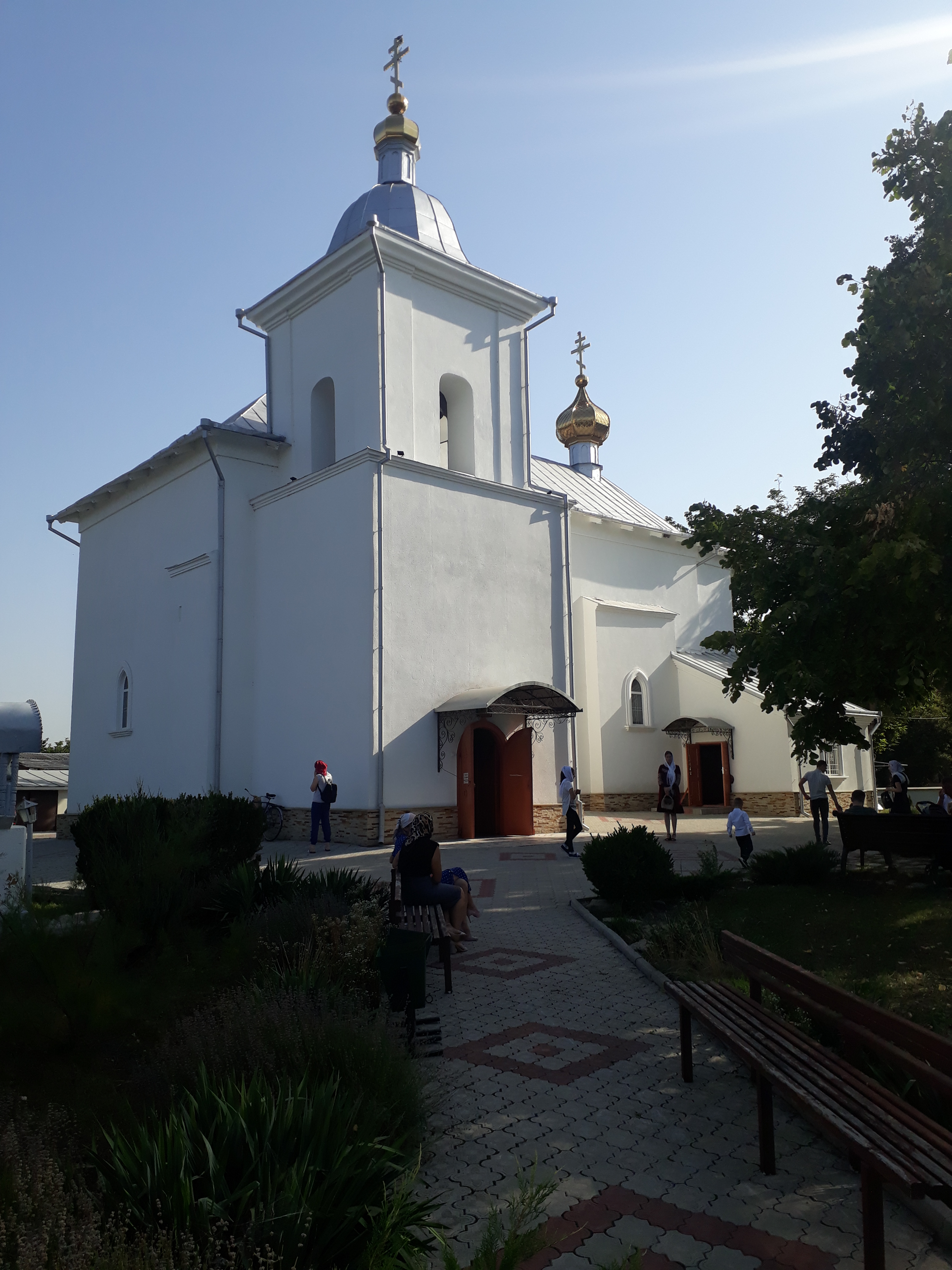
St. Dumitru Church

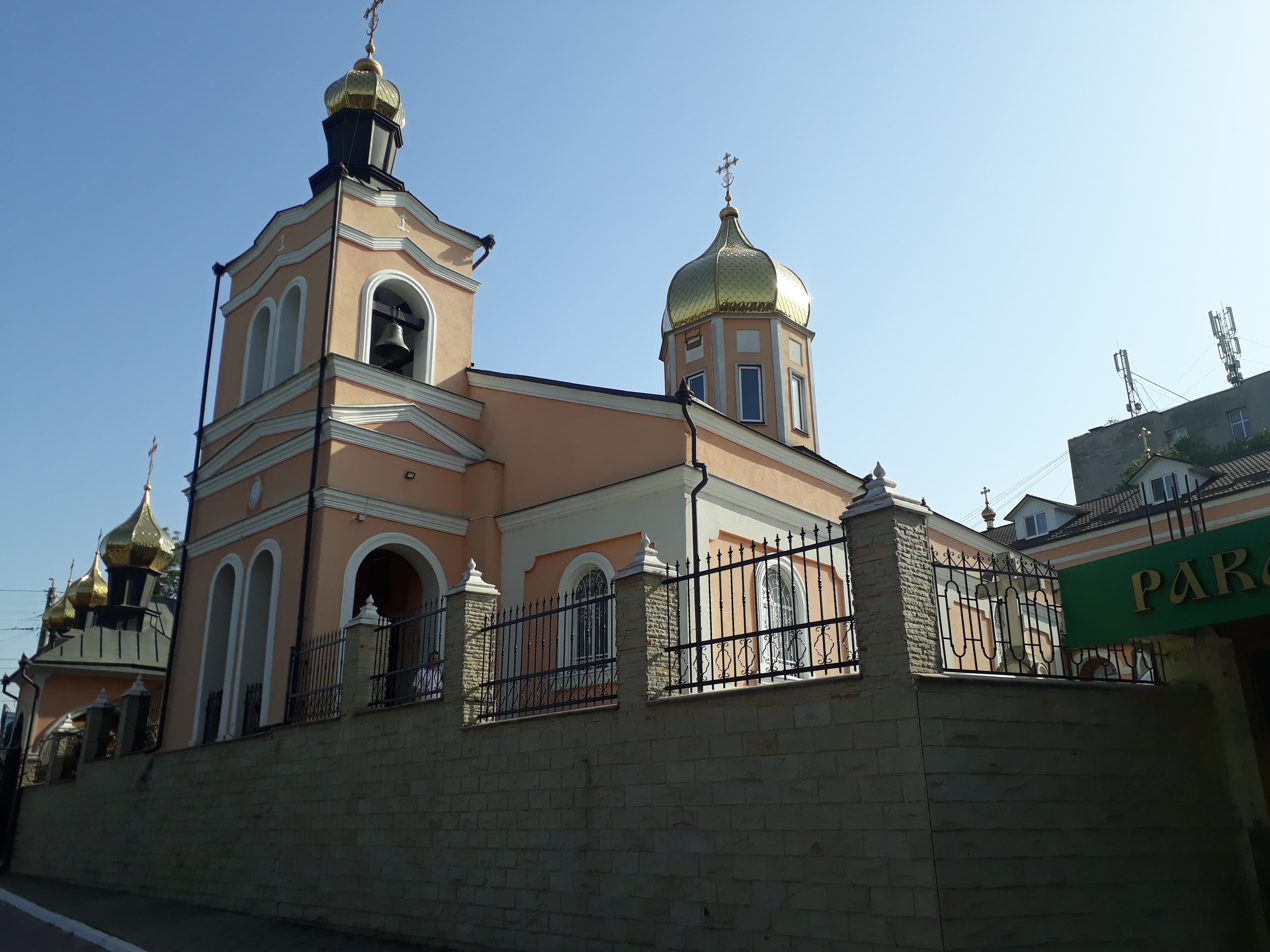
Saint Nicholas church

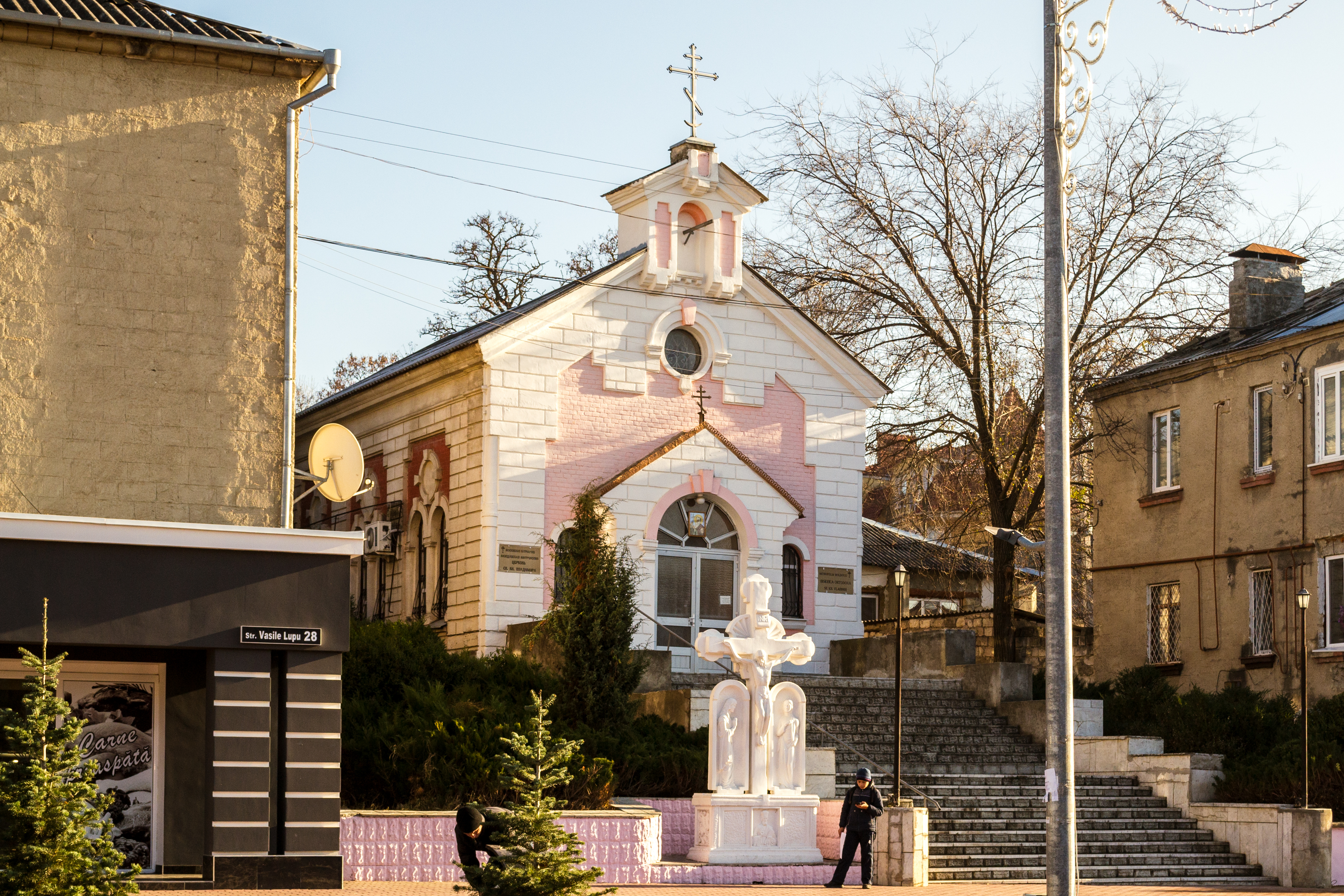
Armenian church
