= Hamburg Football Association =

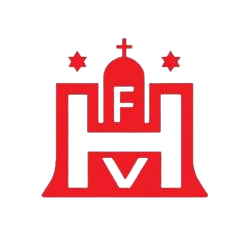
- Formation: 1 February 1947
- Type: Football association
- Headquarters: Jenfelder Allee 70 a-c
- Location: Hamburg
- Members: 181,233 (2017)
- President: Dirk Fischer
- Parent organization: German Football Association
- Website: www.hfv.de

The Hamburg Football Association (German: Hamburger Fußball-Verband), the HFV, is one of 21 state organisations of the German Football Association, the DFB, and covers the state of Hamburg and some parts of southern Schleswig-Holstein.

== Overview ==
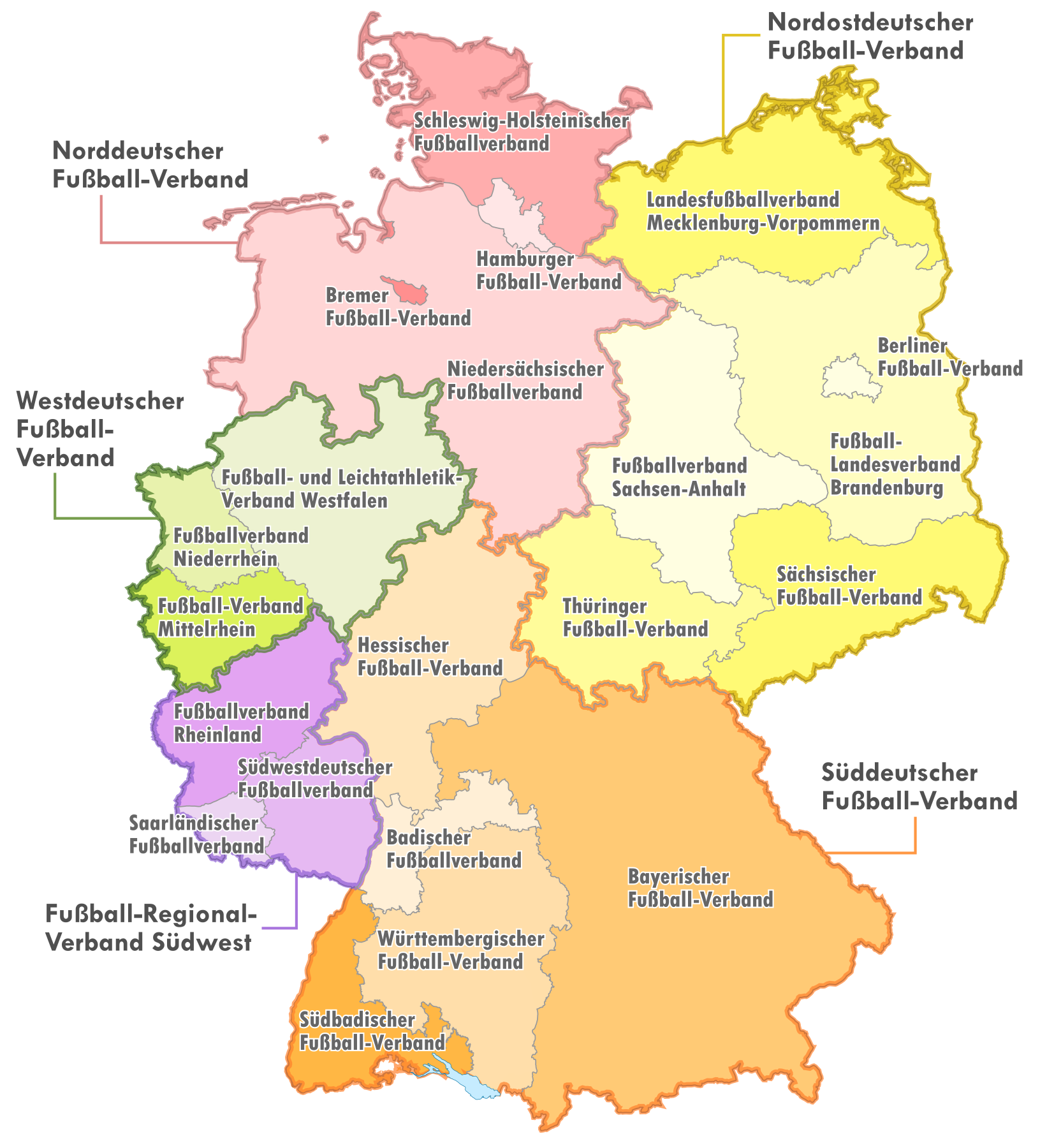
DFB, its five regional and 21 state associations

The HFV is also part of the Northern German Football Association, one of five regional federations in Germany. The other members of the regional association are the Bremen Football Association, the Lower Saxony Football Association and the Schleswig-Holstein Football Association.

In 2017, the HFV had 181,233 members, 469 member clubs and 3,371 teams playing in its league system.
