= Schleswig-Holstein Football Association =

- Formation: 30 August 1947
- Type: Football association
- Headquarters: Haus des Sportes Winterbeker Weg 49
- Location: Kiel, Schleswig-Holstein
- Members: 184,551 (2017)
- President: Hans-Ludwig Meyer
- Parent organization: German Football Association
- Website: www.shfv-kiel.de

The Schleswig-Holstein Football Association (German: Schleswig-Holsteinischer Fussball-Verband), the SHFV, is one of 21 state organisations of the German Football Association, the DFB, and covers most parts of the state of Schleswig-Holstein.

== Overview ==
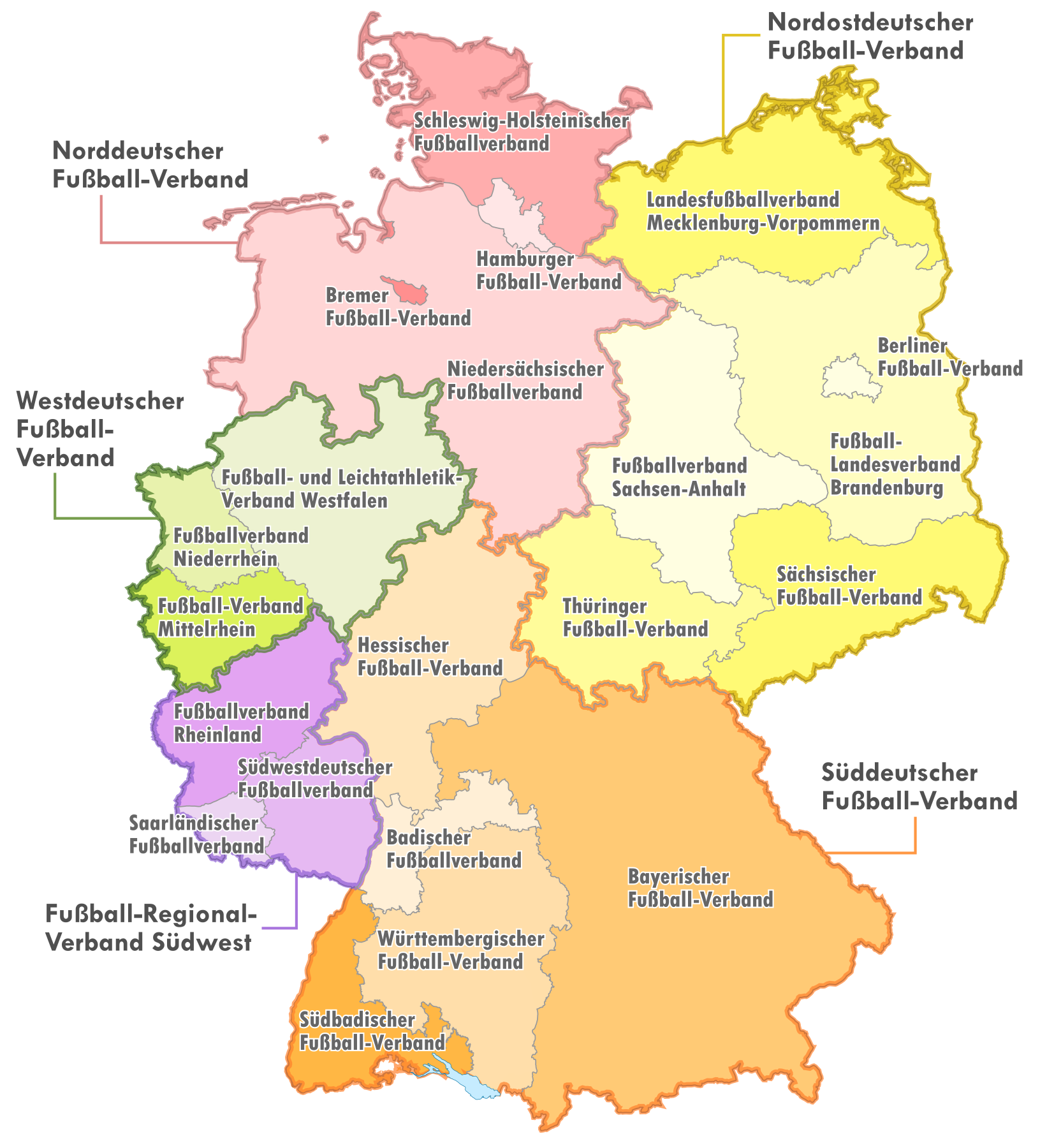
DFB, its five regional and 21 state associations

The SHFV is also part of the Northern German Football Association, one of five regional federations in Germany. The other members of the regional association are the Bremen Football Association, the Hamburg Football Association and the Lower Saxony Football Association.

In 2017, the SHFV had 184,551 members, 585 member clubs and 5,046 teams playing in its league system.
