= Kärra KIF =

Swedish football club

- Full name: Kärra/Klareberg Idrottsförening
- Nickname: KKIF
- Ground: Klarebergsvallen; Hisings Kärra; Gothenburg; Sweden
- Chairman: Ulf Jansson
- League: Division 4 Göteborg B
| Home colours | Away colours |

Kärra KIF (also known as Kärra/Klareberg IF) is a Swedish football club located in Hisings Kärra, Gothenburg.

== Background ==
Kärra KIF currently plays in Division 4 Göteborg B which is the sixth tier of Swedish football. They play their home matches at the Klarebergsvallen in Hisings Kärra.

The club is affiliated to Göteborgs Fotbollförbund. Kärra IF have competed in the Svenska Cupen on 5 occasions and have played 7 matches in the competition.

== Season to season ==
| Season | Level | Division | Section | Position | Movements |
|---|---|---|---|---|---|
| 2006* | Tier 8 | Division 6 | Göteborg D | 1st | Promoted |
| 2007 | Tier 7 | Division 5 | Göteborg A | 4th | |
| 2008 | Tier 7 | Division 5 | Göteborg A | 3rd | Promoted |
| 2009 | Tier 6 | Division 4 | Göteborg A | 1st | Promoted |
| 2010 | Tier 5 | Division 3 | Nordvästra Götalandd | 9th | Relegation Playoffs – Relegated |
| 2011 | Tier 6 | Division 4 | Göteborg B | 6th | |

* League restructuring in 2006 resulted in a new division being created at Tier 3 and subsequent divisions dropping a level.
