= Länderpokal =

German Football Cup

- Formerly: Kronprinzenpokal (1908–18); Bundespokal (1918–33); Reichsbundpokal (1935–42)
- Sport: Football
- Founded: 1908
- No. of teams: 21
- Country: Germany
- Most recent champion: South West
- Most titles: Bavaria

The Länderpokal (English: States Cup) is the oldest cup competition of the German Football Association. It came into existence as the Kronprinzenpokal (English:Crown Prince Cup) but has changed its name various times since. The cup is held annually at the Sportschule Duisburg-Wedau. Contestants in the cup are teams of the 21 regional football associations, composed of youth players from that area. Also guest teams are invited each year since 2005, which play in the competition but will not be awarded a place in the final standings.

In the past, the cup was contested by senior regional selections, later by senior amateur selections from the Amateur-Oberligas and below. In the mid-1990s, this was changed to Under-21 selections. In 1981 the a women's competition was introduced. Record titleholder for the men's competition is the Bavarian football association.

== History ==
William, the German Crown Prince

The competition was formed in 1908, when the German Crown Prince William donated a cup to the German Football Association - DFB, to initiate the Kronprinzenpokal. His only condition for the new competition was that the final was always to be played in Berlin.

The trophy had an inscription engraved which it still bears today:

"Seine Kaiserliche und Königliche Hoheit Wilhelm, Kronprinz des Deutschen Reiches und von Preußen stiftete im Jahre 1908 diesen Pokal als Wanderpreis für Fußball-Wettspiele zwischen den repräsentativen Mannschaften der Landesverbände des Deutschen Fußball-Bundes"

"His Imperial and Royal Highness William, Crown Prince of the German Empire and Prussia donated this trophy in 1908 as a reward for football competitions between the teams of the regional associations of the German Football Association"

The Kronprinzenpokal was initially contested by only seven teams, the selections of the seven regional German football associations, North, South, West, Brandenburg, Central, South East and Baltic.

With the end of the First World War, the name of the competition was altered to reflect the fact, that Germany was not a monarchy anymore. The trophy donated by William with its inscription is however still used and handed to the winner each season.

== Winners ==
=== Kronprinzenpokal ===
Held from 1909 to 1918, when the monarchy in Germany was abolished, the Crown Prince Cup was the first version of the tournament. It was contested between the selections of the seven regional football associations in Germany at the time. The competition was interrupted by the First World War and was not held in 1915 and 1916:

Year	Winner
1909	Central Germany
1910	Southern Germany
1911	Northern Germany
1912	Southern Germany
1913	Western Germany
1914	Northern Germany
1915	not held
1916	not held
1917	Northern Germany
1918	Brandenburg

=== Bundespokal ===
The competition continued in its previous form after the end of the monarchy, in the new German Republic, now renamed Federal Cup:

Year	Winner
1919	Northern Germany
1920	Western Germany
1921	Central Germany
1922	Southern Germany
1923	Southern Germany
1924	Southern Germany
1925	Northern Germany
1926	Southern Germany
1927	Central Germany
1928	South Eastern Germany
1929	Brandenburg
1930	Northern Germany
1931	Southern Germany
1932	Northern Germany
1933	Southern Germany

=== Reichsbundpokal ===
In 1933, with the rise of the Nazis to power, the old regional football federations were abolished, football in Germany was centralized and the Gauligas were introduced, 16 regional first divisions. A new competition to replace the Bundespokal was introduced in 1935, now contested by selections from the Gaue, the new administrative subdivisions of Germany. This competition lasted until 1942, when the consequences caused by the Second World War made football more and more difficult.

Year	Winner
1935	Gau Mitte
1936	Gau Sachsen
1937	Gau Niederrhein
1938	Gau Nordmark
1939	Gauliga Schlesien
1940	Gau Bayern
1941	Gau Sachsen
1942	Gau Niederrhein

=== Länderpokal ===
Staged for the first and only time after the Second World War, the State Cup was played in 1950 and won by Bavaria.

=== Amateur-Länderpokal ===
From 1951 onwards, the competition, now renamed Amateur State Cup, was open only to non-professional players. It started out with the selections of the fifteen regional football federations in West Germany, not including East German or Saarland selections, the later entering a team from 1957. Selections from the five East German federations only started to participate after the German reunion. The now twenty-one regional football federations are not always identical in size to the current sixteen German federal states; a number of states have more than one federation.

Year	Winner	Runners-up	Result
1951	Lower Rhine	Berlin	5–4 aet
1952	Bavaria	Lower Rhine	4–0
1953	Bavaria	Lower Saxony	5–2
1954	Bavaria	Schleswig-Holstein	3–0
1955	Bavaria	Westphalia	5–2
1956	Hesse	Lower Rhine	3–1
1957	Lower Saxony	Westphalia	3–2
1958	Lower Rhine	Lower Saxony	2–0
1959	Hamburg	Hesse	4–1
1960	Middle Rhine	Hesse	3–0
1961	Hamburg	Schleswig-Holstein	2–1
1962	Westphalia	Middle Rhine	2–1
1963	Bavaria	Hesse	3–1
1964	Middle Rhine	South Baden	4–0
1965	Bavaria	Westphalia	3–2
1966	Westphalia	Lower Saxony	1–0
1967	North Baden	Hesse	2–1
1968	Bavaria	Hamburg	5–0
1969	North Baden	Hamburg	2–1
1970	Bavaria	North Baden	2–1
1971	Bavaria	Lower Rhine	2–1 aet
1972	North Baden	Lower Saxony	2–1
1973	North Baden	Lower Rhine	1–1 aet ^{1}
1974	Middle Rhine	Westphalia	1–0
1975	South West	North Baden	0–0 aet (4–2 pso)
1976	Lower Saxony	Bavaria	1–0
1977	Bavaria	South West	4–2 aet
1978	Westphalia	Lower Saxony	1–0 / 1–0
1979	Württemberg	Berlin	2–1
1980	Bavaria	Lower Rhine	4–2
1981	South West	Hesse	1–1 aet (4–3 pso)
1982	South West	Lower Rhine	3–1
1983	Hesse	Schleswig-Holstein	2–1 aet
1984	Bremen	Bavaria	3–1
1985	Rhineland	Hamburg	1–1 aet (3–2 pso)
1986	Westphalia	Lower Rhine	0–0 aet (4–2 pso)
1987	Lower Saxony	Berlin	3–1
1988	Württemberg	Lower Rhine	2–0
1989	Bavaria	Hesse	2–2 aet (4–2 pso)
1990	Bavaria	Baden	3–0
1991	Lower Rhine	Hesse	1–1 aet (4–3 pso)
1992	Hesse	Bremen	3–2
1993	Westphalia	Hesse	5–2
1994	Westphalia	Bavaria	3–1 aet
1995	Lower Rhine	Rhineland	1–0
1996	Baden	Middle Rhine	1–0
1997	Westphalia	Rhineland	4–1
1998	Westphalia	Middle Rhine	5–2
1999	Schleswig-Holstein	Lower Saxony	4–1
2000	Bavaria	Westphalia	2–1
2001	Württemberg	Westphalia	3–0
2002	Middle Rhine	Westphalia	3–0
2003	South West	Lower Saxony	2–2 aet (4–2 pso)
2004	Middle Rhine	Bremen	1–0

Since 2005, a final is not played anymore and the competitions winner is determined by a group stage.

Year	Winner	Runners-up
2005	Saxony	Württemberg
2006	Lower Rhine	Middle Rhine
2007	Lower Rhine	Baden
2008	South West	Berlin
2009	Württemberg	Westphalia
2010	Middle Rhine	Württemberg

- ^{1} North Baden declared the winner because Lower Rhine was unable to field a team for the rematch.

== Competitors ==
=== 1950 onwards ===
The selections of the twenty-one regional German football federations take part in the cup, these being:

- Bavaria (Bayern), covering the state of Bavaria
- Berlin, covering the city state of Berlin ^{+}
- Brandenburg, covering the state of Brandenburg ^{+}
- Bremen, covering the city state of Bremen
- Hamburg covering the city state of Hamburg
- Hesse (Hessen), covering the state of Hesse
- Lower Rhine (Niederrhein), covering the north western part of the state of North Rhine-Westphalia
- Lower Saxony (Niedersachsen), covering the state of Lower Saxony
- Mecklenburg-Vorpommern, covering the state of Mecklenburg-Vorpommern ^{+}
- Middle Rhine (Mittelrhein), covering the south western part of the state of North Rhine-Westphalia
- North Baden (Nordbaden), covering the north western part of the state of Baden-Württemberg
- Rhineland (Rheinland), covering the northern half of Rhineland-Palatinate
- Saarland, covering the state of Saarland
- Saxony (Sachsen), covering the state of Saxony ^{+}
- Saxony-Anhalt (Sachsen-Anhalt), covering the state of Saxony-Anhalt ^{+}
- Schleswig-Holstein, covering the state of Schleswig-Holstein
- South Baden (Südbaden), covering the south western part of the state of Baden-Württemberg
- South West (Südwest), covering the southern half of Rhineland-Palatinate
- Thuringia (Thüringen), covering the state of Thuringia ^{+}
- Westphalia (Westfalen), covering the eastern part of the state of North Rhine-Westphalia
- Württemberg, covering the eastern part of the state of Baden-Württemberg, divided into north and south in the first edition in 1951.
  - ^{+} Formerly part of East Germany, except Berlin, which was divided between East and West.
  - German names in brackets, when different from English name.
