= Trofeo delle Regioni (football) =

Torneo delle Regioni is an annual Italian football tournament for amateur teams which represent the Italian regions. It has been played since 1959 and, from 1998, the winner has taken part in the UEFA Regions' Cup.

In 2010 it merged with Coppa Nazionale Primavera, an event for Allievi and Giovanissimi representative teams of Italian regions. The trophy now had 6 events, Juniores for U18 players, Allievi for U16 players and Giovanissimi for U15 players, as well as female representative teams and 5-a-side football (both male and female respectively).

== Champions ==
1959 Lazio
1960 Lazio
1961 Emilia Romagna
1962 Campania
1963 Puglia
1964 Lazio
1965 Campania
1966 Friuli Venezia Giulia
1967 Piemonte Val d’Aosta
1968 Toscana
1969 (not played)
1970 Toscana
1971 Lazio
1972 Sicilia
1973 Lombardia
1974 (not played)
1975 Abruzzo
1976 Veneto
1977 Veneto
1978 Calabria
1979 Lombardia
1980 Lombardia
1981 Marche
1982 Veneto
1983 Friuli Venezia Giulia
1984 Friuli Venezia Giulia
1985 Veneto
1986 Toscana
1987 Toscana
1988 Toscana
1989 Abruzzo
1990 Toscana
1991 Toscana
1992 Campania
1993 Toscana
1994 Sicilia
1995 Veneto
1996 Lazio
1997 Umbria
1998 Veneto
1999 Abruzzo
2000 Piemonte Valle d'Aosta
2001 Piemonte Valle d'Aosta
2002 Veneto

- 2003 Tuscany
- 2004 Lombardy
- 2005 Tuscany
- 2006/07 Piedmont Aosta Valley
- 2008 Piedmont Aosta Valley
- 2009 Abruzzo

=== Juniores ===
- 2010 Abruzzo
- 2011 Veneto
- 2012 Umbria

=== Allievi ===
Coppa Nazionale Primavera

- 2006 Campania
- 2007 Veneto
- 2008
- 2009 Sardinia

Allievi del Trofeo delle Regioni

- 2010
- 2011
- 2012

=== Giovanissimi ===
Coppa Nazionale Giovanissimi
Giovanissimi del Trofeo delle Regioni

== See also ==
- FA Inter-League Cup
- Spanish stage of the UEFA Regions' Cup
- UEFA Regions' Cup
