= Württemberg regional football team =

German association football team

Württemberg
- Association: Württemberg Football Association
- Head coach: Michael Rentschler
- Top scorer: Martin Kleinschrodt; Marian Asch (7)

First international
- Lesser Poland Voivodeship 0–1 Württemberg (Kingdom of Württemberg) (Marijampolė, Lithuania; 21 September 2002)

Biggest win
- (Kingdom of Württemberg) Württemberg 14–1 Phthiotis (Greece) (Ta' Qali, Malta; 11 December 2010)

Biggest defeat
- (Hungary) Eastern Region 6–1 Württemberg (Kingdom of Württemberg) (Brumov-Bylnice, Czech Republic; 28 October 2012)

UEFA Regions' Cup
- Appearances: 4 (first in 2003)
- Best result: Bronze (2003)

The Württemberg regional football team is the amateur association football team representing Württemberg, Germany. The team competes in the German Football Association's annual U21 Länderpokal under the auspices of the Württemberg Football Association. The team has also been Germany's representative in the UEFA Regions' Cup four times.

== Players ==
=== Current squad ===
The following players were selected for the 2015 UEFA Regions' Cup.

No.	Pos.	Player	Date of birth (age)	Caps	Goals	Club
	GK	Marcel Susser	17 March 1987 (aged 28)			
	GK	Julian Hauser	20 December 1989 (aged 25)			
	GK	Luis Loução	3 September 1989 (aged 25)			
	DF	Tizian Amon	15 March 1994 (aged 21)			
	DF	Valentin Asch	9 August 1991 (aged 23)			
	DF	Sven Franzen	21 April 1987 (aged 28)			
	DF	Andreas Grimmer	5 August 1988 (aged 26)			
	DF	Lukas Hartmann	25 July 1992 (aged 22)			
	DF	Nico Nierichlo	12 August 1989 (aged 25)			
	DF	Manuel Pflumm	18 July 1985 (aged 29)			
	DF	Benjamin Sturm	1 July 1988 (aged 26)			
	DF	Johannes Volk	16 May 1986 (aged 29)			
	MF	Mario Di Biccari	7 June 1985 (aged 30)			
	MF	Pierre Eiberger	13 July 1991 (aged 23)			
	MF	Martin Kleinschrodt	13 August 1985 (aged 29)			
	MF	Jonas Wiest	7 January 1992 (aged 23)			
	MF	Marc Wissmann	8 August 1990 (aged 24)			
	FW	Marian Asch	15 December 1987 (aged 27)			
	FW	David Braig	22 July 1991 (aged 23)			
	FW	Marcel Brandstetter	6 March 1988 (aged 27)			
	FW	Mario Marinić	9 September 1984 (aged 30)			
	FW	Daniel Schachtschneider	20 April 1989 (aged 26)			
	FW	Daniel Seemann	28 December 1991 (aged 23)			

== Honours ==
=== UEFA Regions’ Cup ===
- Bronze: 2003 (1)

=== Länderpokal ===
- Winner: 1979, 1988, 2001, 2009 (4)
- Runner-up: 2005, 2010, 2014, 2015, 2019 (5)

== UEFA Regions' Cup ==
=== 2003 ===
==== Preliminary round ====
21 September 2002 Group Stage	Lesser Poland (Lesser Poland Voivodeship)	0–1	(Kingdom of Württemberg) Württemberg	Marijampolė, Lithuania
		Report	Deligiannidis 6'

23 September 2002 Group Stage	Württemberg (Kingdom of Württemberg)	5–1	Tauragė	Kaunas, Lithuania
	Gärtner 5', 23'; Deligiannidis 44' (pen.); Raaf 45+2'; Peschel 61' (pen.)	Report	Dapkus 34'

25 September 2002 Group Stage	Brest (Brest, Belarus)	0–4	(Kingdom of Württemberg) Württemberg	Marijampolė, Lithuania
		Report	Raaf 17'; Mangold 19'; Berggötz 64'; Schuska 65'

==== Final tournament ====
22 June 2003 Group Stage	Württemberg (Kingdom of Württemberg)	4–0	Ticino	Heidenheim, Germany
	Intemperante 10'; Peschel 12'; Kaiser 47'; Mangold 85'	Report		Stadium: Albstadion

24 June 2003 Group Stage	Württemberg (Kingdom of Württemberg)	1–1	Asturias	Schwäbisch Gmünd, Germany
	Demirkiran 57'	Report	Quero 83'	Stadium: Jahnstadion

26 June 2003 Group Stage	Württemberg (Kingdom of Württemberg)	1–3	Piedmont–Aosta Valley	Oberkochen, Germany
	Kaiser 89'	Report	Bergantin 53', 90+3'; Capra 89'	Stadium: Carl-Zeiss-Stadion

Source: RSSSF

=== 2011 ===
==== Intermediary round ====
7 December 2010 Group Stage	Malta	0–1	(Kingdom of Württemberg) Württemberg	Ta' Qali, Malta
		Report	Molinari 40'	Stadium: Centenary Stadium; Referee: David Malcolm (Northern Ireland)

9 December 2010 Group Stage	Galicia (Galicia (Spain))	1–1	(Kingdom of Württemberg) Württemberg	Ta' Qali, Malta
	Álvarez Asch 87'	Report	Marian Asch 13'	Stadium: Centenary Stadium; Referee: Luc Wouters (Belgium)

11 December 2010 Group Stage	Württemberg (Kingdom of Württemberg)	14–1	(Greece) Phthiotis	Ta' Qali, Malta
	Laible 5', 23'; Hirning 12', 90'; Tunjić 41', 58'; Mangold 54'; Molinari 74', 85'; Schwarz 81', 87', 89'; Grimmer 84'; Marian Asch 90+4'	Report	Chymeftos 70'	Stadium: Centenary Stadium; Referee: David Malcolm (Northern Ireland)

==== Final tournament ====
21 June 2011 Group Stage	Plysky (Ukraine)	0–2	(Kingdom of Württemberg) Württemberg	Vila Verde, Portugal
		Report	Faber 10'; Martin Kleinschrodt 30'	Stadium: Estadio Municipal; Referee: Ján Valášek (Slovakia)

23 June 2011 Group Stage	Zlín	1–0	(Kingdom of Württemberg) Württemberg	Fão, Portugal
	Stojaspal 78'	Report		Stadium: Complexo Desportivo; Referee: Igor Pristovnik (Croatia)

26 June 2011 Group Stage	Württemberg (Kingdom of Württemberg)	1–3	(Portugal) Braga	Vila Verde
	Martin Kleinschrodt 67'	Report	Ferreira 37', 88'; Nobre 45+3'	Stadium: Estadio Municipal; Referee: Ken Henry Johnson (Norway)

Source: RSSSF

=== 2013 ===
==== Intermediary round ====
24 October 2012 Group Stage	Württemberg (Kingdom of Württemberg)	6–1	West Central Scotland	Otrokovice, Czech Republic
	Onesi 24'; Martin Kleinschrodt 39', 48'; Brandstetter 76'; Mähr 79'; Pflumm 88'	Report	Quigley 90+2'	Stadium: Areal Batov; Referee: Sergiy Dankovskyy (Ukraine)

26 October 2012 Group Stage	Zlín	0–4	(Kingdom of Württemberg) Württemberg	Morkovice-Slížany, Czech Republic
		Report	Onesi 29', 80'; Marian Asch 52', 60'	Stadium: Stadion v Morkovicích; Referee: Eiko Saar (Estonia)

28 October 2012 Group Stage	Eastern Region (Hungary)	6–1	(Kingdom of Württemberg) Württemberg	Brumov-Bylnice, Czech Republic
	Domokos 5', 45+1', 68'; Less 39'; Mészáros 70'; Pálvölgyi 90+3'	Report	Foelsch 84'	Stadium: Stadion FC Elseremo Brumov; Referee: Eiko Saar (Estonia)

=== 2015 ===
==== Intermediary round ====
23 September 2014 Group Stage	Württemberg (Kingdom of Württemberg)	2–1	Eastern Slovakia	Poprad, Slovakia
	Mario Marinić 13'; Jonas Wiest 82'	Report	Matúš Jurč 85'	Stadium: National Training Centre; Referee: Aleksandr Gauzer (Kazakhstan)

25 September 2014 Group Stage	Württemberg (Kingdom of Württemberg)	7–0	Isle of Man	Poprad, Slovakia
	Martin Kleinschrodt 20'; Marian Asch 37', 85'; Jonas Wiest 60', 61'; Mario Marinić 80', 87'	Report		Stadium: National Training Centre; Referee: Ville Nevalainen (Finland)

27 September 2014 Group Stage	East West Central Scotland	0–1	(Kingdom of Württemberg) Württemberg	Poprad, Slovakia
		Report	Martin Kleinschrodt 21'	Stadium: Stadium Velka; Referee: Denis Scherbakov (Belarus)

==== Final tournament ====
26 June 2015 Group Stage	Eastern Region (Northern Ireland)	2–2	(Kingdom of Württemberg) Württemberg	Dublin, Ireland
	Richard Thompson 12', 14'	Report	Manuel Pflumm 79' (pen.); Mario Marinić 81'	Stadium: Whitehall Stadium; Referee: Mikhail Vilkov (Russia

28 June 2015 Group Stage	Dolnośląskie (Poland)	0–1	(Kingdom of Württemberg) Württemberg	Dublin, Ireland
		Report	Marian Asch 82'	Stadium: Whitehall Stadium

1 July 2015 Group Stage	Württemberg (Kingdom of Württemberg)	1–2	Zagreb	Dublin, Ireland
	Martin Kleinschrodt 4'	Report	Antun Strjački 31'; Željko Štulec 76'	Stadium: Whitehall Stadium; Referee: Nikolaj Hänni (Switzerland)

Source: RSSSF
