= 2011 UEFA Regions' Cup =

UEFA Regions' Cup 2011

Tournament details
- Host country: Portugal
- Dates: 21–28 June 2011
- Teams: 8

Final positions
- Champions: (Portugal) Braga (1st title)
- Runners-up: (Republic of Ireland) Leinster & Munster

The 2011 UEFA Regions' Cup was the seventh edition of the UEFA Regions' Cup. The final tournament phase was held in Portugal, in the city of Braga. The cup was won by the hosts of the tournament, Braga, who beat Leinster & Munster from the Republic of Ireland in the final by 2 – 1.

== Preliminary round ==
The twelve teams in the preliminary round have been drawn into three group of four, with the following countries hosting each group's matches:

Group A – Croatia
Group B – Hungary
Group C – (North Macedonia) Macedonia

Matches in the preliminary round were played between 1 August and 30 September 2010. The three group winners and the two best runners-up advance to the intermediary round (only the results of the runners-up against the winners and third-ranked team in each group are taken into account).

=== Group A ===
Team	Pld	W	D	L	GF	GA	GD	Pts
(Turkey) Ankara	3	2	1	0	7	1	+ 6	7
(Croatia) Dalmatia (H)	3	1	2	0	7	4	+ 3	5
(England) Guernsey	3	1	1	1	4	4	0	4
(Wales) Gwent County FA	3	0	0	3	4	13	9	0

24 September 2010
16:30 UTC+1

Ankara (Turkey)	4 – 1	(Wales) Gwent County FA
Williams 35' (o.g.); Aydogan 42', 57'; Deniz 72'	Report	Lewis 13'

Stadion Park Mladeži, Split
Referee: Igor Satchi (Moldova)
24 September 2010
16:30 UTC+1

Dalmatia (Croatia)	1 – 1	(England) Guernsey
Njire 14'	Report	Allen 18'

Stadion Hrvatski vitezovi, Dugopolje
Referee: Tomasz Mikulski (Poland)

26 September 2010
16:30 UTC+1

Ankara (Turkey)	0 – 0	(Croatia) Dalmatia
	Report

Stadion Gospin dolac, Imotski
Referee: Vitaly Sevostyanik (Belarus)
26 September 2010
16:30 UTC+1

Guernsey (England)	3 – 0	(Wales) Gwent County FA
Allen 15', 54'; Dyer 25'	Report

Iza grada, Klis
Referee: Igor Satchi (Moldova)

28 September 2010
16:00 UTC+1

Guernsey (England)	0 – 3	(Turkey) Ankara
	Report	Çetin 67'; Yasin 90+3'; Deniz 90+5'

Stadion pokraj Jadra, Solin
Referee: Tomasz Mikulski (Poland)
28 September 2010
16:00 UTC+1

Gwent County FA (Wales)	3 – 6	(Croatia) Dalmatia
Williams 12', 28'; Hodges 77'	Report	Prizmić 24', 59'; Njire 42'; Jerković 52', 54', 58' (pen.)

Gradski stadion, Sinj
Referee: Vitaly Sevostyanik (Belarus)

=== Group B ===
Team	Pld	W	D	L	GF	GA	GD	Pts
(Israel) FC Karmiel Safed	3	3	0	0	8	0	+ 8	9
West Hungary (H)	3	2	0	1	6	3	+ 3	6
(Romania) Prahova–Muntenia	3	1	0	2	4	7	3	3
(Armenia) Malatia	3	0	0	3	2	10	8	0

31 August 2010
16:30 UTC+1

Malatia (Armenia)	0 – 5	(Israel) FC Karmiel Safed
	Report	Dahan 21'; Levi 31', 90+3'; Zalka 42'; Shteinberg 60'

Bük, Bük
Referee: Domagoj Vučkov (Croatia)
31 August 2010
16:30 UTC+1

West Hungary	4 – 1	(Romania) Prahova–Muntenia
Mészáros 5'; Kovács 32'; Flórián 45+2'; Marosvölgyi 54'	Report	Matei 14'

Városi stadion, Sopron
Referee: Yuriy Moseychuk (Ukraine)

2 September 2010
16:30 UTC+1

Malatia (Armenia)	1 – 2	West Hungary
Karapetyan 48'	Report	Flórián 11', 26'

Városi stadion, Sopron
Referee: Bobby Madden (Scotland)
2 September 2010
16:30 UTC+1

Prahova–Muntenia (Romania)	0 – 2	(Israel) FC Karmiel Safed
	Report	Zalka 79'; Hammudi 90+3'

Bük, Bük
Referee: Yuriy Moseychuk (Ukraine)

4 September 2010
16:30 UTC+1

Prahova–Muntenia (Romania)	3 – 1	(Armenia) Malatia
Stoian 64'; Vane 68'; Stroe 77' (pen.)	Report	Karapetyan 90+3' (pen.)

Bük, Bük
Referee: Domagoj Vučkov (Croatia)
4 September 2010
16:30 UTC+1

FC Karmiel Safed (Israel)	1 – 0	West Hungary
Zalka 15'	Report

Városi stadion, Sopron
Referee: Bobby Madden (Scotland)

=== Group C ===
Team	Pld	W	D	L	GF	GA	GD	Pts
(North Macedonia) South East FYR Macedonia (H)	3	2	1	0	12	2	+10	7
(Northern Ireland) Eastern Region	3	2	1	0	6	1	+ 5	7
(Sweden) Sandarna BK	3	1	0	2	2	4	2	3
(Estonia) FC HaServ Tartu	3	0	0	3	0	13	13	0

25 September 2010
15:00 UTC+1

South East FYR Macedonia (North Macedonia)	3 – 1	(Sweden) Sandarna BK
Todorov 3'; Atanasov 29', 71' (pen.)	Report	Skytting 72'

Stadion Mladost, Strumica
Referee: Alexander Kostadinov (Bulgaria)
25 September 2010
15:00 UTC+1

Eastern Region (Northern Ireland)	4 – 0	(Estonia) FC HaServ Tartu
Boyd 37', 65', 72'; Moffat 78' (pen.)	Report

FK Turnovo, Strumica
Referee: Aleksander Gauzer (Kazakhstan)

27 September 2010
15:00 UTC+1

South East FYR Macedonia (North Macedonia)	1 – 1	(Northern Ireland) Eastern Region
Todorov 33'	Report	McQuitty 32'

Stadion Mladost, Strumica
Referee: Aleksander Gauzer (Kazakhstan)
27 September 2010
15:00 UTC+1

FC HaServ Tartu (Estonia)	0 – 1	(Sweden) Sandarna BK
	Report	Sanden 89'

FK Turnovo, Strumica
Referee: Suren Baliyan (Armenia)

29 September 2010
15:00 UTC+1

FC HaServ Tartu (Estonia)	0 – 8	(North Macedonia) South East FYR Macedonia
	Report	Varelovski 10'; Dunimagloski 24', 61', 83'; Trajčev 28'; Gunev 80'; Dimitrioski 86'; Atanasov 90+1'

Stadion Mladost, Strumica
Referee: Aleksander Gauzer (Kazakhstan)
29 September 2010
15:00 UTC+1

Sandarna BK (Sweden)	0 – 1	(Northern Ireland) Eastern Region
	Report	McParland 8'

FK Turnovo, Strumica
Referee: Suren Baliyan (Armenia)

=== Best runners-up ===
Group	Runner-up Team	Pld	W	D	L	GF	GA	GD	Pts
C	(Northern Ireland) Eastern Region	2	1	1	0	2	1	+ 1	4
B	West Hungary	2	1	0	1	4	2	+ 2	3
A	(Croatia) Dalmatia^{1}	2	0	1	1	1	1	0	2

^{1} The competition rules state that the two best runners-up qualify to the intermediary round, with only the results of the runners-up against the winners and third-ranked team in each group being taken into account. However, due to the Bosnian-Herzegovinian Football Federation being suspended by UEFA and FIFA as of 1 April 2011, Dalmatia, the worst runner-up, was allowed to progress to the intermediary round, replacing Bosnia-Herzegovina's representative team, Kanton Sarajevo, in Group 6.

== Intermediary round ==
The 26 teams which went straight through to the intermediary round (after the exclusion of Kanton Sarajevo from Bosnia-Herzegovina, due to their suspension) were joined by the three group winners and three runners-up from the preliminary round. The 32 teams have been drawn into eight groups of four, with the following countries hosting each group's matches:

Group 1 – Malta
Group 2 – Portugal
Group 3 – Republic of Ireland
Group 4 – Slovenia
Group 5 – Bulgaria
Group 6 – Czech Republic
Group 7 – Poland
Group 8 – Ukraine

Matches in the intermediary round were played between 1 August 2010 and 30 April 2011. The winners of each group will qualify for the final tournament.

=== Group 1 ===
Team	Pld	W	D	L	GF	GA	GD	Pts
(Germany) Württemberg	3	2	1	0	16	2	+14	7
(Spain) Galicia	3	2	1	0	10	2	+ 8	7
Malta (H)	3	0	1	2	0	7	7	1
(Greece) Phthiotis	3	0	1	2	2	17	-15	1

7 December 2010
11:30 UTC+1

Phthiotis (Greece)	1 – 3	(Spain) Galicia
Adam 88'	Report	Álvarez 49'; Torres 60'; Souto 90+3'

Centenary Stadium, Ta'Qali
Referee: Luc Wouters (Belgium)
7 December 2010
14:30 UTC+1

Malta	0 – 1	(Germany) Württemberg
	Report	Molinari 40'

Centenary Stadium, Ta'Qali
Referee: David Malcolm (Northern Ireland)

9 December 2010
11:30 UTC+1

Galicia (Spain)	1 – 1	(Germany) Württemberg
Álvarez 87'	Report	Asch 13'

Centenary Stadium, Ta'Qali
Referee: Luc Wouters (Belgium)
9 December 2010
14:30 UTC+1

Malta	0 – 0	(Greece) Phthiotis
	Report

Centenary Stadium, Ta'Qali
Referee: Pavle Radovanović (Montenegro)

11 December 2010
14:30 UTC+1

Galicia (Spain)	6 – 0	Malta
Rey-Cabarcos 15' (pen.); Poratti 18'; Rodríguez 30', 65', 73'; Souto 38'	Report

National Stadium, Ta'Qali
Referee: Pavle Radovanović (Montenegro)
11 December 2010
14:30 UTC+1

Württemberg (Germany)	14 – 1	(Greece) Phthiotis
Laible 5', 23'; Hirning 12', 90'; Tunjić 41', 58'; Mangold 54'; Molinari 74', 85'; Schwarz 81', 87', 89'; Grimmer 84'; Asch 90+4'	Report	Chymeftos 70'

Centenary Stadium, Ta'Qali
Referee: David Malcolm (Northern Ireland)

=== Group 2 ===
Team	Pld	W	D	L	GF	GA	GD	Pts
(Portugal) Braga (H)	3	3	0	0	9	1	+ 8	9
(Belgium) Centre	3	1	0	2	5	7	2	3
East West Central Scotland	3	1	0	2	5	7	2	3
(Switzerland) Ticino	3	1	0	2	4	8	4	3

1 December 2010
15:00 UTC

Ticino (Switzerland)	2 – 3	(Belgium) Centre
Dell'Avo 22', 64'	Report	Bogemans 41'; Hmouda 69'; Bourguignon 74'

Estádio Padre Sá Pereira, Esposende
Referee: Halis Özkahya (Turkey)
1 December 2010
17:30 UTC

East West Central Scotland	1 – 3	(Portugal) Braga
Clarke 45+1'	Report	Nobre 3'; A. Gonçalves 33'; Veiga 89' (pen.)

Estádio Cidade de Barcelos, Barcelos
Referee: Gabriele Rossi (San Marino)

3 December 2010
15:00 UTC

East West Central Scotland	1 – 2	(Switzerland) Ticino
McKendry 31'	Report	Kukleci 16'; Rizzello 20'

Complexo Desportivo C.F. Fão, Fão
Referee: Tero Nieminen (Finland)
3 December 2010
17:30 UTC

Centre (Belgium)	0 – 2	(Portugal) Braga
	Report	Leite 14'; Novo 90+3'

Estádio Cidade de Barcelos, Barcelos
Referee: Gabriele Rossi (San Marino)

5 December 2010
15:30 UTC

Centre (Belgium)	2 – 3	East West Central Scotland
Walker 6' (o.g.); Mellebeek 13'	Report	McKendry 8'; Grant 55'; Paterson 85'

Estádio Padre Sá Pereira, Esposende
Referee: Halis Özkahya (Turkey)
5 December 2010
15:30 UTC

Braga (Portugal)	4 – 0	(Switzerland) Ticino
Ferreira 49' (pen.); A. Gonçalves 55'; M. Gonçalves 63', 75'	Report

Complexo Desportivo C.F. Fão, Fão
Referee: Tero Nieminen (Finland)

=== Group 3 ===
Team	Pld	W	D	L	GF	GA	GD	Pts
(Republic of Ireland) Leinster & Munster (H)	3	2	1	0	5	0	+ 5	7
(Italy) Abruzzo	3	1	2	0	2	1	+ 1	5
(France) Ligue de Normandie	3	1	1	1	7	4	+ 3	4
San Marino	3	0	0	3	0	9	9	0

23 October 2010
14:30 UTC

Leinster & Munster (Republic of Ireland)	0 – 0	(Italy) Abruzzo
	Report

Tolka Park, Dublin
Referee: Michael Svendsen (Denmark)
23 October 2010
14:30 UTC

San Marino	0 – 6	(France) Ligue de Normandie
	Report	Cibelli 27' (o.g.); Gilbert 67'; Affagard 69', 73', 85', 88'

Carlisle Grounds, Bray
Referee: Elmir Pilav (Bosnia & Herzegovina)

25 October 2010
14:30 UTC

Leinster & Munster (Republic of Ireland)	2 – 0	San Marino
Carrig 3'; Lacey 8'	Report

Tolka Park, Dublin
Referee: Elmir Pilav (Bosnia & Herzegovina)
25 October 2010
14:30 UTC

Ligue de Normandie (France)	1 – 1	(Italy) Abruzzo
Simon 20'	Report	Lalli 72'

Dalymount Park, Dublin
Referee: Alan Mario Sant (Malta)

27 October 2010
14:30 UTC

Ligue de Normandie (France)	0 – 3	(Republic of Ireland) Leinster & Munster
	Report	Walsh 9' (pen.), 79' (pen.); Whelehan 90+4'

Tallaght Stadium, Dublin
Referee: Michael Svendsen (Denmark)
27 October 2010
14:30 UTC

Abruzzo (Italy)	1 – 0	San Marino
Lalli 44'	Report

UCD Bowl, Dublin
Referee: Alan Mario Sant (Malta)

=== Group 4 ===
Team	Pld	W	D	L	GF	GA	GD	Pts
(Turkey) Ankara	3	3	0	0	7	1	+6	9
(Slovenia) MNZ Murska Sobota (H)	3	1	1	1	5	5	0	4
(North Macedonia) South East FYR Macedonia	3	1	1	1	3	4	-1	4
(Israel) FC Karmiel Safed	3	0	0	3	1	6	-5	0

5 April 2011
14:00 UTC+1

FC Karmiel Safed (Israel)	0 – 1	(Turkey) Ankara
	Report	Derin 90+2'

Križevci, Križevci
Referee: Vlado Glodjović (Serbia)
5 April 2011
16:00 UTC+1

MNZ Murska Sobota (Slovenia)	1 – 1	(North Macedonia) South East FYR Macedonia
Bokan 69'	Report	Imeri 3'

Veržej, Veržej
Referee: Suren Baliyan (Armenia)

7 April 2011
16:00 UTC+1

MNZ Murska Sobota (Slovenia)	3 – 1	(Israel) FC Karmiel Safed
Krpič 46'; Grah 47'; Sukič 64'	Report	Suissa 9' (pen.)

Križevci, Križevci
Referee: Ilias Spathas (Greece)
7 April 2011
16:00 UTC+1

Ankara (Turkey)	3 – 0	(North Macedonia) South East FYR Macedonia
Deniz 37', 90+3'; Isler 45+1'	Report

Veržej, Veržej
Referee: Suren Baliyan (Armenia)

9 April 2011
16:00 UTC+1

Ankara (Turkey)	3 – 1	(Slovenia) MNZ Murska Sobota
Çetin 12', 88'; Deniz 52'	Report	Z. Horvat 84'

Veržej, Veržej
Referee: Vlado Glodjović (Serbia)
9 April 2011
16:00 UTC+1

South East FYR Macedonia (North Macedonia)	2 – 0	(Israel) FC Karmiel Safed
Mojsovski 35'; Iliev 38'	Report

Križevci, Križevci
Referee: Ilias Spathas (Greece)

=== Group 5 ===
Team	Pld	W	D	L	GF	GA	GD	Pts
(Serbia) Belgrade^{2}	3	1	2	0	2	0	+2	5
(Bulgaria) South West Bulgaria^{2} (H)	3	1	2	0	2	0	+2	5
(Slovakia) Slovak Western Region	3	1	2	0	1	0	+1	5
(Northern Ireland) Eastern Region	3	0	0	3	0	5	-5	0

^{2} The group winner was decided by drawing of lots between Belgrade and South West Bulgaria.

16 April 2011
16:00 UTC+2

South West Bulgaria	0 – 0	(Slovakia) Slovak Western Region
	Report

Georgi Benkovski Stadium, Teteven
Referee: Dawid Piasecki (Poland)
16 April 2011
16:00 UTC+2

Belgrade (Serbia)	2 – 0	(Northern Ireland) Eastern Region
Stanojević 70'; Stefanović 90+3'	Report

Lokomotiv Stadium, Mezdra
Referee: Ignasi Villamayor Rozados (Andorra)

18 April 2011
16:00 UTC+2

South West Bulgaria	0 – 0	(Serbia) Belgrade
	Report

Georgi Benkovski Stadium, Teteven
Referee: Ignasi Villamayor Rozados (Andorra)
18 April 2011
16:00 UTC+2

Eastern Region (Northern Ireland)	0 – 1	(Slovakia) Slovak Western Region
	Report	Fulmek 34'

Lokomotiv Stadium, Mezdra
Referee: Goran Spirkoski (Macedonia)

20 April 2011
16:00 UTC+2

Eastern Region (Northern Ireland)	0 – 2	South West Bulgaria
	Report	Fikiyn 68'; Mihaylov 87' (pen.)

Georgi Benkovski Stadium, Teteven
Referee: Goran Spirkoski (Macedonia)
20 April 2011
16:00 UTC+2

Western Slovakia	0 – 0	(Serbia) Belgrade
	Report

Lokomotiv Stadium, Mezdra
Referee: Dawid Piasecki (Poland)

=== Group 6 ===
Team	Pld	W	D	L	GF	GA	GD	Pts
(Czech Republic) Zlín (H)	3	2	1	0	5	1	+4	7
Western Hungary	3	1	2	0	6	3	+3	5
(Lithuania) FK Alytis	3	1	1	1	6	4	+2	4
(Croatia) Dalmatia	3	0	0	3	1	10	-9	0

23 April 2011
13:00 UTC+2

Dalmatia (Croatia)	0 – 3 (f) (3 – 1)	(Lithuania) FK Alytis
(Jerković 6' (pen.)) (Bugarija 50', 58')	Report	(Laibinis 85')

cs:Stadion Širůch, Staré Město
Referee: Slavko Vinčić (Slovenia)

Result changed from 3–1 to 0–3, after fielding of an ineligible player by Dalmatia.

23 April 2011
16:00 UTC+2

Zlín (Czech Republic)	0 – 0	Western Hungary
	Report

Stadion FC Morkovice, Morkovice-Slížany
Referee: Yunus Yıldırım (Turkey)

25 April 2011
13:00 UTC+2

FK Alytis (Lithuania)	3 – 3	Western Hungary
Bunickij 4' (pen.); Miknevičius 23', 28'	Report	Dobesch 52'; Patkó 61'; Csorba 83'

Stadion FC Morkovice, Morkovice-Slížany
Referee: Þorvaldur Árnason (Iceland)
25 April 2011
16:00 UTC+2

Zlín (Czech Republic)	4 – 1	(Croatia) Dalmatia
Lukáš 9'; Vrága 37'; Huťka 85'; Valášek 90+2'	Report	Jakovčević 69'

Spytihněv, Spytihněv
Referee: Slavko Vinčić (Slovenia)

27 April 2011
16:00 UTC+2

FK Alytis (Lithuania)	0 – 1	(Czech Republic) Zlín
	Report	Stojaspal 51'

Stadion SK Hanácká Slavia Kroměříž, Kroměříž
Referee: Þorvaldur Árnason (Iceland)
27 April 2011
16:00 UTC+2

Western Hungary	3 – 0	(Croatia) Dalmaia
Mészáros 12'; Müllerlei 32'; Csorba 34'	Report

Stadion FC Morkovice, Morkovice-Slížany
Referee: Yunus Yıldırım (Turkey)

=== Group 7 ===
Team	Pld	W	D	L	GF	GA	GD	Pts
South Region Russia	3	2	1	0	11	1	+10	7
Lesser Poland (H)	3	2	1	0	8	3	+ 5	7
(Finland) Helsinki	3	1	0	2	4	11	7	3
(Belarus) FC Azot Grodno	3	0	0	3	3	11	8	0

3 August 2010
16:00 UTC+1

Lesser Poland	1 – 1	South Region Russia
Kusia 63' (pen.)	Report	Lednev 68'

GKS Janina, Libiąż
Referee: Liran Liany (Israel)
3 August 2010
18:00 UTC+1

Helsinki (Finland)	3 – 2	(Belarus) FC Azot Grodno
Tapola 59'; Vesterinen 71'; Telinkangas 87'	Report	Kot 27'; Zhegalo 57'

Przebój, Wolbrom
Referee: Anar Salmanov (Azerbaijan)

5 August 2010
17:00 UTC+1

Lesser Poland	4 – 1	(Finland) Helsinki
Zubel 20', 56'; Przenioslo 64'; Wojdala 90+4'	Report	Vesterinen 79'

Przebój, Wolbrom
Referee: Liran Liany (Israel)
5 August 2010
17:00 UTC+1

FC Azot Grodno (Belarus)	0 – 5	South Region Russia
	Report	Tiukalkin 16'; Taranenko 55'; Lednev 63', 70'; Pertiya 66'

Dalin, Myślenice
Referee: Stefano Podeschi (San Marino)

7 August 2010
17:00 UTC+1

FC Azot Grodno (Belarus)	1 – 3	Lesser Poland
Zhegalo 51'	Report	Kiwacki 19', 76'; Zubel 70'

Dalin, Myślenice
Referee: Stefano Podeschi (San Marino)
7 August 2010
17:00 UTC+1

South Region Russia	5 – 0	(Finland) Helsinki
Lednev 10', 27' (pen.), 89'; Deulin 45+2'; Tiukalkin 65'	Report

GKS Janina, Libiąż
Referee: Anar Salmanov (Azerbaijan)

=== Group 8 ===
Team	Pld	W	D	L	GF	GA	GD	Pts
(Ukraine) Yednist Plysky (H)	3	3	0	0	15	0	+15	9
(Moldova) Ialoveni	3	2	0	1	3	2	+1	6
(Latvia) Flaminko/RFS Riga	3	1	0	2	4	10	6	3
(Azerbaijan) Chevik	3	0	0	3	1	11	10	0

28 August 2010
13:00 UTC+2

Flaminko/RFS Riga (Latvia)	0 – 1	(Moldova) Ialoveni
	Report	Dogot 90+3'

Olympic sports training centre, Chernihiv
Attendance: 50
Referee: George Vadachkoria (Georgia)
28 August 2010
18:00 UTC+2

Yednist Plysky (Ukraine)	5 – 0	(Azerbaijan) Chevik
Samsonenko 7', 34'; Valko 25'; V. Tarykin 56'; Yakimenko 70'	Report

Olympic sports training centre, Chernihiv
Attendance: 400
Referee: Albano Janku (Albania)

30 August 2010
17:00 UTC+2

Yednist Plysky (Ukraine)	8 – 0	(Latvia) Flaminko/RFS Riga
Tverdovskiy 10', 63'; V. Tarykin 13', 19', 68'; Stetsyuk 35'; Nechyporenko 72'; Yakimenko 85'	Report

FC Yednist, Plysky
Attendance: 650
Referee: Albano Janku (Albania)
30 August 2010
17:00 UTC+2

Ialoveni (Moldova)	2 – 0	(Azerbaijan) Chevik
Dogot 30'; Borta 88'	Report

FC Yednist, Plysky
Attendance: 100
Referee: Þóroddur Hjaltalín (Iceland)

1 September 2010
17:00 UTC+2

Ialoveni (Moldova)	0 – 2	(Ukraine) Yednist Plysky
	Report	Lytvyn 68'; V. Tarykin 82'

FC Yednist, Plysky
Attendance: 1200
Referee: George Vadachkoria (Georgia)
1 September 2010
17:00 UTC+2

Chevik (Azerbaijan)	1 – 4	(Latvia) Flaminko/RFS Riga
Aslanov 29'	Report	Peršteins 4'; Pojarkovs 24' (pen.); Satilbeko 45'; Sovtuss 74'

Olympic sports training centre, Chernihiv
Attendance: 50
Referee: Þóroddur Hjaltalín (Iceland)

== Final tournament ==
The final tournament was held in Braga District, Portugal from 21 to 28 June 2011.

=== Group stage ===
The group stage draw took place on 11 May 2011, producing two groups of four teams each. The two group winners advance to the final, while the runners-up of each group receive bronze medals.

==== Group A ====
Team	Pld	W	D	L	GF	GA	GD	Pts
(Portugal) Braga (H)	3	3	0	0	8	3	+5	9
(Czech Republic) Zlín	3	2	0	1	4	4	0	6
(Germany) Württemberg	3	1	0	2	3	4	-1	3
(Ukraine) Yednist Plysky	3	0	0	3	2	6	-4	0

21 June 2011
17:00 WEST

Braga (Portugal)	3 – 1	(Czech Republic) Zlín
Veiga 45' (pen.); Leite 53'; Silva 65'	Report	Daněk 68' (pen.)

Estádio 1º de Maio, Braga
Referee: Harald Lechner (Austria)
21 June 2011
18:00 WEST

Yednist Plysky (Ukraine)	0 – 2	(Germany) Württemberg
	Report	Faber 10'; Kleinschrodt 30'

Estádio Municipal, Vila Verde
Referee: Ján Valášek (Slovakia)

23 June 2011
17:30 WEST

Braga (Portugal)	2 – 1	(Ukraine) Yednist Plysky
Ferreira 22' (pen.); Simões 59'	Report	Babor 10'

Estádio Cidade de Barcelos, Barcelos
Referee: Lorenc Jemini (Albania)
23 June 2011
17:30 WEST

Zlín (Czech Republic)	1 – 0	(Germany) Württemberg
Stojaspal 78'	Report

Complexo Desportivo C.F. Fão, Fão
Referee: Igor Pristovnik (Croatia)

26 June 2011
17:30 WEST

Württemberg (Germany)	1 – 3	(Portugal) Braga
Kleinschrodt 67'	Report	Ferreira 37', 88'; Nobre 45+3'

Municipal, Vila Verde
Referee: Ken Henry Johnson (Norway)
26 June 2011
17:30 WEST

Zlín (Czech Republic)	2 – 1	(Ukraine) Yednist Plysky
Školník 68' (pen.); Valko 70' (o.g.)	Report	Babor 34'

Primeiro de Maio, Braga
Referee: Ioannis Anastasiou (Cyprus)

==== Group B ====
Team	Pld	W	D	L	GF	GA	GD	Pts
(Republic of Ireland) Leinster & Munster	3	2	1	0	3	1	+2	7
(Serbia) Belgrade	3	2	0	1	5	3	+2	6
(Turkey) Ankara	3	1	1	1	2	3	-1	4
South Region Russia	3	0	0	3	4	7	-3	0

21 June 2011
17:00 WEST

Ankara (Turkey)	0 – 0	(Republic of Ireland) Leinster & Munster
	Report

Cidade de Barcelos, Barcelos
Referee: Igor Pristovnik (Croatia)
21 June 2011
18:00 WEST

South Region Russia	2 – 3	(Serbia) Belgrade
Valiulin 37'; Avanyan 80'	Report	Živković 4'; Blagojević 35'; Gudović 73'

Complexo Desportivo C.F. Fão, Fão
Referee: Ioannis Anastasiou (Cyprus)

23 June 2011
17:00 WEST

South Region Russia	1 – 2	(Turkey) Ankara
Tyukalkin 44' (pen.)	Report	Deniz 13'; Çetinkaya 79'

Estádio Municipal, Vila Verde
Referee: Harald Lechner (Austria)
23 June 2011
19:30 WEST

Belgrade (Serbia)	0 – 1	(Republic of Ireland) Leinster & Munster
	Report	Whelehan 52'

Estádio Municipal, Vila Verde
Referee: Ken Henry Johnsen (Norway)

26 June 2011
17:30 WEST

Leinster & Munster (Republic of Ireland)	2 – 1	South Region Russia
Barbour 64'; O'Sullivan 68'	Report	Ushakov 13'

Estádio Cidade de Barcelos, Barcelos
Referee: Lorenc Jemini (Albania)
26 June 2011
17:30 WEST

Belgrade (Serbia)	2 – 0	(Turkey) Ankara
Živković 41' (pen.); Gostiljac 81'	Report

Complexo Desportivo C.F. Fão, Fão
Referee: Ján Valášek (Slovakia)

=== Final ===
28 June 2011
18:30 WEST

Braga (Portugal)	2 – 1	(Republic of Ireland) Leinster & Munster
Nobre 62'; Fortunato 84'	Report	O'Sullivan 68'

Estádio Cidade de Barcelos, Barcelos
Referee: Ken Henry Johnson (Norway)

2011 UEFA Regions' Cup
Winners

Braga

== See also ==
- UEFA Regions' Cup
