= Çadırlı =

- Location within Azerbaijan
- Coordinates: 39°49′43″N 48°56′52″E
- Country: Azerbaijan
- Rayon: Salyan
- Municipality: Qaraçala
- Time zone: UTC+4 (AZT)
  - Summer (DST): UTC+5 (AZT)

Çadırlı (known as Şatrovka or Shatrovka until 2009) is a village in the Salyan Rayon of Azerbaijan. The village forms part of the municipality of Qaraçala.
