= Malkolm Moënza =

Swedish footballer

Personal information
- Full name: Malkolm Staffan Moënza
- Date of birth: 15 November 1993 (age 32)
- Place of birth: Gothenburg, Sweden
- Height: 1.78 m (5 ft 10 in)
- Positions: Left-back; left winger

Team information
- Current team: Utsikten
- Number: 13

Youth career
- Sandarna BK
- GAIS

Senior career*
| Years | Team | Apps | (Gls) |
| 2012–2017 | GAIS | 124 | (8) |
| 2017–2019 | Dalkurd | 52 | (3) |
| 2020 | Spartak Trnava | 11 | (0) |
| 2020 | Dalkurd | 17 | (1) |
| 2021 | GAIS | 27 | (0) |
| 2022–2023 | Jönköpings Södra | 57 | (2) |
| 2024– | Utsikten | 51 | (7) |

International career
| 2013 | Sweden U19 | 2 | (0) |
| 2014 | Sweden U21 | 2 | (1) |
- * Club domestic league appearances and goals as of 16 November 2025

Malkolm Staffan Moënza (born 15 November 1993) is a Swedish footballer who plays for Utsikten as a left-back or left winger.

== Career ==
=== Club career ===
In mid-January 2020, Moënza had signed with Slovak leading club, Spartak Trnava.

He had appeared in all four fixtures, since the resuming of the season after the winter break, until the end of the regular part of the season, prior to the outbreak of the COVID-19 pandemic in Slovakia. He had made his debut on 16 February 2020 at Štadión Antona Malatinského in Trnava, during a goal-less tie against reigning champions, table leaders and old-time rivals of Spartak - Slovan Bratislava. He completed the entire fixture.

After a spell at his former club GAIS in 2021, Moënza signed a two-year deal with Jönköpings Södra IF on 20 December 2021.

== Personal life ==
Moënza was born in Majorna in Gothenburg, to a Guadeloupean father and a Swedish mother.
