= 2013 UEFA Regions' Cup =

UEFA Regions' Cup 2013

Tournament details
- Host country: Italy
- Teams: 8

Final positions
- Champions: (Italy) Veneto (2nd title)
- Runners-up: (Spain) Catalonia

The 2013 UEFA Regions' Cup is the 8th edition of the UEFA Regions' Cup.

== Preliminary round ==
The 8 teams in the preliminary round have been drawn into two group of four, with the following countries hosting each group's matches:

Group A – Turkey
Group B – (North Macedonia) South East FYR Macedonia

Matches in the preliminary round were played between 30 August and 13 September 2012. The two group winners and the best runners-up advance to the intermediary round (only the results of the runners-up against the winners and third-ranked team in each group are taken into account).

=== Group A ===
| Team | Pld | W | D | L | GF | GA | GD | Pts |
|---|---|---|---|---|---|---|---|---|
| (Romania) Prahova-Muntenia | 3 | 2 | 1 | 0 | 11 | 2 | +9 | 7 |
| (Turkey) Istanbul (H) | 3 | 2 | 0 | 1 | 9 | 4 | +5 | 6 |
| (Israel) Karmiel-Safed | 3 | 1 | 1 | 1 | 9 | 4 | +5 | 4 |
| (Kazakhstan) Merkuriy | 3 | 0 | 0 | 3 | 2 | 21 | -19 | 0 |

9 September 2012
14:00 EET

| Karmiel-Safed (Israel) | 0 – 0 | (Romania) Prahova-Muntenia |
|---|---|---|
| | Report |

Kartal Liçe, Istanbul
Referee: Nikola Popov (Bulgaria)
9 September 2012
16:00 EET

| Merkuriy (Kazakhstan) | 0 – 5 | (Turkey) Istanbul |
|---|---|---|
| | Report | Hazir 28', 72'; Alkan 58', 69'; Elaman 80' |

Maltepe, Istanbul
Referee: Enea Jorgji (Albania)

11 September 2012
14:00 EET

| Merkuriy (Kazakhstan) | 1 – 7 | (Israel) Karmiel-Safed |
|---|---|---|
| Zhimbekov 84' | Report | Hammudi 16', 87'; Zaika 18'; Malul 34'; Touval 64'; Elimelech 73'; Falah 74' |

Pendik, Istanbul
Referee: Nikola Dabanović (Montenegro)
11 September 2012
16:00 EET

| Prahova-Muntenia (Romania) | 2 – 1 | (Turkey) Istanbul |
|---|---|---|
| Ene 10'; Bridinel 26' | Report | Alkan 22' |

Maltepe, Istanbul
Referee: Enea Jorgji (Albania)

13 September 2012
16:00 EET

| Prahova-Muntenia (Romania) | 9 – 1 | (Kazakhstan) Merkuriy |
|---|---|---|
| Puiulet 9', 59', 64'; Nae 11', 19'; Ene 13', 69'; Micu 57'; Baragan 79' | Report | Kobzev 40' |

Pendik, Istanbul
Referee: Nikola Dabanović (Montenegro)
13 September 2012
16:00 EET

| Istanbul (Turkey) | 3 – 2 | (Israel) Karmiel-Safed |
|---|---|---|
| Öztürk 73'; Hazir 89'; Alkan 90+2' | Report | Hammudi 57', 88' |

Maltepe, Istanbul
Referee: Nikola Popov (Bulgaria)

=== Group B ===
| Team | Pld | W | D | L | GF | GA | GD | Pts |
|---|---|---|---|---|---|---|---|---|
| (North Macedonia) South East FYR Macedonia (H) | 3 | 2 | 1 | 0 | 8 | 0 | +8 | 7 |
| (Northern Ireland) Eastern Region | 3 | 2 | 1 | 0 | 4 | 1 | +3 | 7 |
| North Wales | 3 | 0 | 1 | 2 | 2 | 4 | -2 | 1 |
| (Sweden) Hestrafors | 3 | 0 | 1 | 2 | 1 | 10 | -9 | 1 |

30 August 2012
16:00 CET

| South East FYR Macedonia (North Macedonia) | 1 – 0 | North Wales |
|---|---|---|
| Petrovski 33' | Report |

Stadion Mladost, Strumica
Referee: Gerhard Grobelnik (Austria)
30 August 2012
16:00 CET

| Hestrafors (Sweden) | 0 – 2 | (Northern Ireland) Eastern Region |
|---|---|---|
| | Report | Maguire 33'; Moffatt 90+2' |

Stadion Kukuš, Turnovo
Referee: Nikolaj Hänni (Switzerland)

1 September 2012
16:00 CET

| South East FYR Macedonia (North Macedonia) | 7 – 0 | (Sweden) Hestrafors |
|---|---|---|
| Koteski 26'; Petrovski 46'; Tashkov 63'; Bojinovski 75', 77'; Kjeleshoski 83', 86' | Report |

Stadion Mladost, Strumica
Referee: Gerhard Grobelnik (Austria)
1 September 2012
16:00 CET

| Eastern Region (Northern Ireland) | 2 – 1 | North Wales |
|---|---|---|
| Wright 27'; Moffatt 44' | Report | Hay 42' |

Stadion Kukuš, Turnovo
Referee: Radek Matějek (Czech Republic)

3 September 2012
16:00 CET

| Eastern Region (Northern Ireland) | 0 – 0 | (North Macedonia) South East FYR Macedonia |
|---|---|---|
| | Report |

Stadion Mladost, Strumica
Referee: Nikolaj Hänni (Switzerland)
3 September 2012
16:00 CET

| North Wales | 1 – 1 | (Sweden) Hestrafors |
|---|---|---|
| Harper 11' | Report | Svalin 57' |

Stadion Kukuš, Turnovo
Referee: Radek Matějek (Czech Republic)

== Intermediary round ==
The 29 teams which went straight through to the intermediary round will join by the two group winners and best runner-up from the preliminary round. The 32 teams have been drawn into eight groups of four, with the following countries hosting each group's matches:

Group 1 – Belarus
Group 2 – Bulgaria
Group 3 – Czech Republic
Group 4 – Lithuania
Group 5 – Malta
Group 6 – San Marino
Group 7 – Ukraine
Group 8 – Italy

Matches in the intermediary round will be played between 10 August 2012 and 26 April 2013. The winners of each group will qualify for the final tournament.

=== Group 1 ===
| Team | Pld | W | D | L | GF | GA | GD | Pts |
|---|---|---|---|---|---|---|---|---|
| (Belarus) Isloch Minsk Raion (H) | 3 | 3 | 0 | 0 | 5 | 1 | +4 | 9 |
| Paris Île-de-France | 3 | 1 | 1 | 1 | 4 | 4 | 0 | 4 |
| Central Slovakia | 3 | 1 | 0 | 2 | 3 | 5 | -2 | 3 |
| (Bosnia and Herzegovina) Tuzla Canton | 3 | 0 | 1 | 2 | 5 | 7 | -2 | 1 |

10 August 2012

| Isloch Minsk Raion (Belarus) | 2 – 0 | Paris Île-de-France |
|---|---|---|
| Pratskevich 32', 58' | Report |

City Stadium, Molodechno
Referee: Steven McLean (Scotland)
10 August 2012

| Tuzla Canton (Bosnia and Herzegovina) | 2 – 3 | Central Slovakia |
|---|---|---|
| Džanić 68', 79' | Report | Kohút 38'; Palenik 58'; Caban 89' |

City Stadium, Molodechno
Referee: Georgi Yordanov (Bulgaria)

12 August 2012

| Isloch Minsk Raion (Belarus) | 2 – 1 | (Bosnia and Herzegovina) Tuzla Canton |
|---|---|---|
| Lynko 31'; Rudenok 73' | Report | Musić 45+2' |

City Stadium, Molodechno
Referee: Sergejus Slyva (Lithuania)
12 August 2012

| Central Slovakia | 0 – 2 | Paris Île-de-France |
|---|---|---|
| | Report | Bahoua 45+1'; Maingault 63' |

City Stadium, Molodechno
Referee: Georgi Yordanov (Bulgaria)

14 August 2012

| Central Slovakia | 0 – 1 | (Belarus) Isloch Minsk Raion |
|---|---|---|
| | Report | Pustokhod 86' |

City Stadium, Molodechno
Referee: Sergejus Slyva (Lithuania)
14 August 2012

| Paris Île-de-France | 2 – 2 | (Bosnia and Herzegovina) Tuzla Canton |
|---|---|---|
| Lacen 2', 54' | Report | Džanić 32'; Bahoua 69' (o.g.) |

City Stadium, Molodechno
Referee: Steven McLean (Scotland)

=== Group 2 ===
| Team | Pld | W | D | L | GF | GA | GD | Pts |
|---|---|---|---|---|---|---|---|---|
| Southeast Bulgaria (H) | 3 | 2 | 0 | 1 | 5 | 5 | 0 | 6 |
| (Croatia) Rijeka | 3 | 1 | 2 | 0 | 6 | 1 | +5 | 5 |
| (Romania) Prahova-Muntenia | 3 | 1 | 1 | 1 | 1 | 3 | −2 | 4 |
| (Switzerland) Geneva | 3 | 0 | 1 | 2 | 1 | 4 | −3 | 1 |

3 April 2013

| Southeast Bulgaria | 3 – 0 | (Romania) Prahova-Muntenia |
|---|---|---|
| Viyachki 45+2'; Stefanov 60'; Bangeev 71' | Report |

Stadion Rakovski, Sevlievo
Referee: Jari Järvinen (Finland)
3 April 2013

| Geneva (Switzerland) | 1 – 1 | (Croatia) Rijeka |
|---|---|---|
| Meddour 8' | Report | Mance 90+3' |

Stadion Georgi Benkovski, Teteven
Referee: Hubert Siejewicz (Poland)
5 April 2013

| Southeast Bulgaria | 2 − 0 | (Switzerland) Geneva |
|---|---|---|
| Ivanov 15'; Bangeev 38' | Report |

Gradski stadion, Lovech
Referee: Aleksei Eskov (Russia)
5 April 2013

| Rijeka (Croatia) | 0 − 0 | (Romania) Prahova-Muntenia |
|---|---|---|
| | Report |

Stadion Rakovski, Sevlievo
Referee: Jari Järvinen (Finland)
7 April 2013

| Rijeka (Croatia) | 5 − 0 | Southeast Bulgaria |
|---|---|---|
| Pavić 36'; Cianci 48'; Grbac 61'; Baša 71', 78' | Report |

Gradski stadion, Lovech
Referee: Aleksei Eskov (Russia)
7 April 2013

| Prahova-Muntenia (Romania) | 1 − 0 | (Switzerland) Geneva |
|---|---|---|
| Bridinel 54' | Report |

Stadion Rakovski, Sevlievo
Referee: Hubert Siejewicz (Poland)

=== Group 3 ===
| Team | Pld | W | D | L | GF | GA | GD | Pts |
|---|---|---|---|---|---|---|---|---|
| (Hungary) Eastern Region | 3 | 3 | 0 | 0 | 12 | 4 | +8 | 9 |
| (Germany) Württemberg | 3 | 2 | 0 | 1 | 11 | 7 | +4 | 6 |
| (Czech Republic) Zlín (H) | 3 | 1 | 0 | 2 | 7 | 8 | -1 | 3 |
| West Central Scotland | 3 | 0 | 0 | 3 | 5 | 16 | -11 | 0 |

24 October 2012

| Zlín (Czech Republic) | 1 – 2 | (Hungary) Eastern Region |
|---|---|---|
| Matějka 26' | Report | Ricsei 33'; Domokos 61' |

FC Elseremo Brumov, Brumov-Bylnice
Referee: Ognjen Valjić (Bosnia and Herzegovina)
24 October 2012

| Württemberg (Germany) | 6 – 1 | West Central Scotland |
|---|---|---|
| Onesi 24'; Kleinschrodt 39', 48'; Brandstetter 76'; Mähr 79'; Pflumm 88' | Report | Quigley 90+2' |

Areal Batov, Otrokovice
Referee: Sergiy Dankovskyy (Ukraine)
26 October 2012

| Zlín (Czech Republic) | 0 – 4 | (Germany) Württemberg |
|---|---|---|
| | Report | Onesi 29', 80'; Asch 52', 60' |

FC Morkovice, Morkovice-Slížany
Referee: Eiko Saar (Estonia)
26 October 2012

| West Central Scotland | 2 – 4 | (Hungary) Eastern Region |
|---|---|---|
| Broadfoot 83'; Kerr 90+2' | Report | Domokos 27'; Less 31', 44'; Pálvölgyi 80' |

Areal Batov, Otrokovice
Referee: Ognjen Valjić (Bosnia and Herzegovina)
28 October 2012

| West Central Scotland | 2 – 6 | (Czech Republic) Zlín |
|---|---|---|
| Broadfoot 11'; McClure 12' | Report | Liška 3', 37'; Huťka 30'; Michalek 74'; Konrád 77'; Dufka 90+1' |

Areal Batov, Otrokovice
Referee: Sergiy Dankovskyy (Ukraine)
28 October 2012

| Eastern Region (Hungary) | 6 – 1 | (Germany) Württemberg |
|---|---|---|
| Domokos 5', 45+1', 68'; Less 39'; Mészáros 70'; Pálvölgyi 90+3' | | Foelsch 84' |

FC Elseremo Brumov, Brumov-Bylnice
Referee: Eiko Saar (Estonia)

=== Group 4 ===
| Team | Pld | W | D | L | GF | GA | GD | Pts |
|---|---|---|---|---|---|---|---|---|
| (Azerbaijan) Qaraçala | 3 | 3 | 0 | 0 | 7 | 1 | +6 | 9 |
| (Serbia) Belgrade | 3 | 2 | 0 | 1 | 9 | 2 | +7 | 6 |
| (North Macedonia) South East FYR Macedonia | 3 | 1 | 0 | 2 | 3 | 5 | -2 | 3 |
| (Lithuania) Lietava | 3 | 0 | 0 | 3 | 0 | 11 | -11 | 0 |

22 April 2013

| Belgrade (Serbia) | 3 – 0 (f) (1 – 2) | (North Macedonia) South East FYR Macedonia |
|---|---|---|
| Donevski 75' | Report | Stojcevski 44'; Koteski 68' |

National Football Academy, Kaunas
Referee: Sándor Szabó (Hungary)
22 April 2013

| Lietava (Lithuania) | 0 – 3 | (Azerbaijan) Qaraçala |
|---|---|---|
| | Report | Alakbarov 68'; Dadashov 82'; Aliyev 87' |

National Football Academy, Kaunas
Referee: Lasha Silagava (Georgia)
24 April 2013

| South East FYR Macedonia (North Macedonia) | 0 – 2 | (Azerbaijan) Qaraçala |
|---|---|---|
| | Report | Alakbarov 30'; Kochaliyev 90+2' |

National Football Academy, Kaunas
Referee: Lasha Silagava (Georgia)
24 April 2013

| Lietava (Lithuania) | 0 – 5 | (Serbia) Belgrade |
|---|---|---|
| | Report | Ranđić 4'; Donevski 21'; Vojnović 26'; Crnomarković 63'; Krstić 78' |

National Football Academy, Kaunas
Referee: Jakob Kehlet (Denmark)
26 April 2013

| South East FYR Macedonia (North Macedonia) | 3 – 0 | (Lithuania) Lietava |
|---|---|---|
| Dalceski 18', 38'; Kjelesoski 85' | Report |

National Football Academy, Kaunas
Referee: Sándor Szabó (Hungary)
26 April 2013

| Qaraçala (Azerbaijan) | 2 – 1 | (Serbia) Belgrade |
|---|---|---|
| Dadashov 28'; Guliyev 90+1' | Report | Donevski 15' |

LFF Stadium, Vilnius
Referee: Jakob Kehlet (Denmark)

=== Group 5 ===
| Team | Pld | W | D | L | GF | GA | GD | Pts |
|---|---|---|---|---|---|---|---|---|
| (Russia) Olimp Moscow Oblast | 3 | 3 | 0 | 0 | 14 | 0 | +14 | 9 |
| (Malta) Gozo (H) | 3 | 1 | 1 | 1 | 5 | 10 | -5 | 4 |
| (Moldova) Ialoveni | 3 | 0 | 2 | 1 | 4 | 8 | -4 | 2 |
| (Latvia) FK Rīnūži-Strong | 3 | 0 | 1 | 2 | 4 | 9 | -5 | 1 |

14 October 2012

| Gozo (Malta) | 3 – 2 | (Latvia) FK Rīnūži-Strong |
|---|---|---|
| Bezzina 49'; Mercieca 54'; Portelli 78' | Report | Puzirevskis 39'; Simanovskis 88' |

Gozo Stadium, Xewkija
Attendance: 30
Referee: Damir Batinić (Croatia)
14 October 2012

| Olimp Moscow Oblast (Russia) | 4 – 0 | (Moldova) Ialoveni |
|---|---|---|
| Orlov 5', 37'; Asadov 76', 84' | Report |

Gozo Stadium, Xewkija
Attendance: 30
Referee: João Capela (Portugal)
16 October 2012

| Gozo (Malta) | 0 – 6 | (Russia) Olimp Moscow Oblast |
|---|---|---|
| | Report | Orlov 27', 41', 56'; Asadov 34', 86'; Korobetc 83' |

Gozo Stadium, Xewkija
Attendance: 200
Referee: Richard Trutz (Slovakia)
16 October 2012

| Ialoveni (Moldova) | 2 – 2 | (Latvia) FK Rīnūži-Strong |
|---|---|---|
| Raţa 47', 53' | Report | Simanovskis 3'; Zabarovskis 31' |

Gozo Stadium, Xewkija
Attendance: 15
Referee: Damir Batinić (Croatia)
18 October 2012

| Ialoveni (Moldova) | 2 – 2 | (Malta) Gozo |
|---|---|---|
| Spinu 24'; Tonu 74' | Report | Stojanovic 59'; Camilleri 63' |

Gozo Stadium, Xewkija
Attendance: 20
Referee: Richard Trutz (Slovakia)
18 October 2012

| FK Rīnūži-Strong (Latvia) | 0 – 4 | (Russia) Olimp Moscow Oblast |
|---|---|---|
| | Report | Fuflygin 25', 31', 80'; Lishchuk 52' |

Gozo Stadium, Xewkija
Attendance: 22
Referee: João Capela (Portugal)

=== Group 6 ===
| Team | Pld | W | D | L | GF | GA | GD | Pts |
|---|---|---|---|---|---|---|---|---|
| (Northern Ireland) Eastern Region | 3 | 2 | 0 | 1 | 3 | 3 | 0 | 6 |
| (England) Jersey | 3 | 2 | 0 | 1 | 4 | 3 | +1 | 6 |
| (Republic of Ireland) Leinster & Munster | 3 | 1 | 1 | 1 | 3 | 2 | +1 | 4 |
| San Marino (H) | 3 | 0 | 1 | 2 | 0 | 2 | -2 | 1 |

6 March 2013
16:00 (CET)

| Leinster & Munster (Republic of Ireland) | 1 – 2 | (England) Jersey |
|---|---|---|
| Whelehan 83' | Report | Cannon 53'; Savory 54' |

Montecchio, City of San Marino
Referee: Dimitar Meckarovski (Republic of Macedonia)
6 March 2013
20:30 (CET)

| San Marino | 0 – 1 | (Northern Ireland) Eastern Region |
|---|---|---|
| | Report | Ryan 66' |

Stadio Olimpico, Serravalle
Referee: Sergey Tsinkevich (Belarus)
8 March 2013
16:00 (CET)

| San Marino | 0 – 0 | (Republic of Ireland) Leinster & Munster |
|---|---|---|
| | Report |

Montecchio, City of San Marino
Referee: Þóroddur Hjaltalín (Iceland)
8 March 2013
20:30 (CET)

| Jersey (England) | 1 – 2 | (Northern Ireland) Eastern Region |
|---|---|---|
| Russell 64' | Report | Boyle 27'; Curtis 84' |

Stadio Olimpico, Serravalle
Referee: Sergey Tsinkevich (Belarus)
10 March 2013
16:00 (CET)

| Jersey (England) | 1 – 0 | San Marino |
|---|---|---|
| Watson 70' | Report |

Montecchio, City of San Marino
Referee: Þóroddur Hjaltalín (Iceland)
10 March 2013
16:00 (CET)

| Eastern Region (Northern Ireland) | 0 – 2 | (Republic of Ireland) Leinster & Munster |
|---|---|---|
| | Report | Walsh 81'; Whelehan 84' |

Stadio Olimpico, Serravalle
Referee: Dimitar Meckarovski (Republic of Macedonia)

=== Group 7 ===
| Team | Pld | W | D | L | GF | GA | GD | Pts |
|---|---|---|---|---|---|---|---|---|
| (Spain) Catalonia | 3 | 3 | 0 | 0 | 8 | 2 | +6 | 9 |
| (Belgium) Ardennes | 3 | 2 | 0 | 1 | 6 | 5 | +1 | 6 |
| (Ukraine) Nove Zhyttya Andriyivka (H) | 3 | 1 | 0 | 2 | 4 | 5 | -1 | 3 |
| (Slovenia) MNZ Ljubljana | 3 | 0 | 0 | 3 | 3 | 9 | -6 | 0 |

9 October 2012

| Nove Zhyttya Andriyivka (Ukraine) | 3 – 0 | (Slovenia) MNZ Ljubljana |
|---|---|---|
| Rysenko 39', 90+5'; Kapustyan 45+3' | Report |

NUDPSU, Irpin
Referee: Chris Reisch (Luxembourg)
9 October 2012

| Ardennes (Belgium) | 1 – 2 | (Spain) Catalonia |
|---|---|---|
| Cornet 45+2' | Report | Terron 40'; Puigsech 90+3' |

Dinaz, Vyshhorod
Referee: Antonis Giachos (Greece)
11 October 2012

| Nove Zhyttya Andriyivka (Ukraine) | 0 – 1 | (Belgium) Ardennes |
|---|---|---|
| | Report | Martin 10' |

Yuvileiny Stadium, Bucha
Referee: Boško Jovanetić (Serbia)
11 October 2012

| Catalonia (Spain) | 2 – 0 | (Slovenia) MNZ Ljubljana |
|---|---|---|
| Cano 42'; Garros 65' | Report |

NUDPSU, Irpin
Referee: Chris Reisch (Luxembourg)
13 October 2012

| Catalonia (Spain) | 4 – 1 | (Ukraine) Nove Zhyttya Andriyivka |
|---|---|---|
| Cornella 29'; Cano 32'; Garros 76', 90+2' | Report | Petrenko 75' |

Yuvileiny Stadium, Bucha
Referee: Antonis Giachos (Greece)
13 October 2012

| MNZ Ljubljana (Slovenia) | 3 – 4 | (Belgium) Ardennes |
|---|---|---|
| Berger 13'; Starc 31'; Dindič 66' | Report | Lambert 54', 76'; Martin 64'; Manfredi 82' |

Dinaz, Vyshhorod
Referee: Boško Jovanetić (Serbia)

=== Group 8 ===
| Team | Pld | W | D | L | GF | GA | GD | Pts |
|---|---|---|---|---|---|---|---|---|
| (Italy) Veneto (H) | 3 | 3 | 0 | 0 | 14 | 0 | +14 | 9 |
| (Poland) Kujawsko-Pomorskie | 3 | 2 | 0 | 1 | 6 | 1 | +5 | 6 |
| Eastern Finland | 3 | 1 | 0 | 2 | 5 | 10 | -5 | 3 |
| Western Estonia | 3 | 0 | 0 | 3 | 1 | 15 | -14 | 0 |

5 October 2012

| Western Estonia | 0 – 3 | (Poland) Kujawsko-Pomorskie |
|---|---|---|
| | Report | Mik 48'; Paczkowski 66'; Plewa 87' |

Comunale, Musile di Piave
Referee: Clayton Pisani (Malta)
5 October 2012

| Veneto (Italy) | 6 – 0 | Eastern Finland |
|---|---|---|
| Aldrighetti 12'; Gasparato 30'; Solagna 44'; Bozzon 69'; Pedrozo 74'; Guandalini 90+2' | Report |

Stadio Comunale, Mogliano Veneto
Referee: Vasilis Dimitriou (Cyprus)
7 October 2012

| Western Estonia | 0 – 7 | (Italy) Veneto |
|---|---|---|
| | Report | Pedrozo 8'; Guandalini 37', 74'; Solagna 51'; Gasparato 56'; Zanatta 85', 89' |

Stadio Comunale Opitergium, Oderzo
Referee: Vasilis Dimitriou (Cyprus)
7 October 2012

| Eastern Finland | 0 – 3 | (Poland) Kujawsko-Pomorskie |
|---|---|---|
| | Report | Janicki 13'; Plewa 67'; Nowak 70' |

Stadio Comunale, Mogliano Veneto
Referee: Fariz Yusifov (Azerbaijan)
9 October 2012

| Eastern Finland | 5 – 1 | Western Estonia |
|---|---|---|
| Lehijoki 12', 87'; Manninen 50'; Kurikka 64', 82' | Report | Rohtla 15' |

Stadio Comunale Opitergium, Oderzo
Referee: Fariz Yusifov (Azerbaijan)
9 October 2012

| Kujawsko-Pomorskie (Poland) | 0 – 1 | (Italy) Veneto |
|---|---|---|
| | Report | Gagno 73' |

Comunale, Musile di Piave
Referee: Clayton Pisani (Malta)

== Final tournament ==
The final tournament was held in Veneto, Italy from 22 to 29 June 2013.

=== Group stage ===
The group stage draw took place on 9 May 2013, producing two groups of four teams each. The two group winners advance to the final, while the runners-up of each group receive bronze medals.

==== Group A ====
| Team | Pld | W | D | L | GF | GA | GD | Pts |
|---|---|---|---|---|---|---|---|---|
| (Italy) Veneto (H) | 3 | 3 | 0 | 0 | 6 | 1 | +5 | 9 |
| (Hungary) Eastern Region | 3 | 1 | 1 | 1 | 4 | 3 | +1 | 4 |
| (Northern Ireland) Eastern Region | 3 | 1 | 1 | 1 | 8 | 8 | 0 | 4 |
| (Azerbaijan) Qaraçala | 3 | 0 | 0 | 3 | 2 | 8 | -6 | 0 |

22 June 2013
17:30

| Veneto (Italy) | 4 – 1 | (Northern Ireland) Eastern Region |
|---|---|---|
| Ballarini 9', 31'; Lorenzatti 27'; Tegon 48' | Report | Moffatt 53' |

Stadio Comunale Delle Terme, Abano Terme
Referee: Artur Soares (Portugal)
22 June 2013
17:30

| Qaraçala (Azerbaijan) | 0 – 2 | (Hungary) Eastern Region |
|---|---|---|
| | Report | Domokos 39', 45+2' |

Nuovo Stadio Comunale, Este
Referee: Wim Smet (Belgium)
24 June 2013
17:30

| Veneto (Italy) | 1 – 0 | (Azerbaijan) Qaraçala |
|---|---|---|
| Ballarini 65' | Report |

Stadio Maurizio Sacco, Bagnoli di Sopra
Referee: Laurent Kopriwa (Luxembourg)
24 June 2013
17:30

| Eastern Region (Northern Ireland) | 2 – 2 | (Hungary) Eastern Region |
|---|---|---|
| Curtis 42'; Brady 90+2' | Report | Pálvölgyi 66'; Less 70' |

Stadio Comunale Vallini, Piove di Sacco
Referee: Vlado Glođović (Serbia)
27 June 2013
17:30

| Eastern Region (Hungary) | 0 – 1 | (Italy) Veneto |
|---|---|---|
| | Report | Ballarini 10' |

Stadio Comunale Delle Terme, Abano Terme
Referee: Pavle Radovanović (Montenegro)
27 June 2013
17:30

| Eastern Region (Northern Ireland) | 5 – 2 | (Azerbaijan) Qaraçala |
|---|---|---|
| Boyle 6'; Maguire 20', 27', 45'; Cully 90+3' | Report | Atayev 7'; Chovdarov 63' |

Nuovo Stadio Comunale, Este
Referee: Michael Johansen (Denmark)

==== Group B ====
| Team | Pld | W | D | L | GF | GA | GD | Pts |
|---|---|---|---|---|---|---|---|---|
| (Spain) Catalonia | 3 | 2 | 1 | 0 | 5 | 2 | +3 | 7 |
| (Belarus) Isloch Minsk Raion | 3 | 2 | 0 | 1 | 2 | 2 | 0 | 6 |
| Southeast Bulgaria | 3 | 0 | 2 | 1 | 2 | 3 | -1 | 2 |
| (Russia) Olimp Moscow Oblast | 3 | 0 | 1 | 2 | 0 | 2 | -2 | 1 |

22 June 2013
17:30

| Isloch Minsk Raion (Belarus) | 0 – 2 | (Spain) Catalonia |
|---|---|---|
| | Report | Muñoz 59'; Sanchirico 90' |

Stadio Comunale Vallini, Piove di Sacco
Referee: Pavle Radovanović (Montenegro)
22 June 2013
17:30

| Olimp Moscow Oblast (Russia) | 0 – 0 | Southeast Bulgaria |
|---|---|---|
| | Report |

Stadio Maurizio Sacco, Bagnoli di Sopra
Referee: Michael Johansen (Denmark)
24 June 2013
17:30

| Isloch Minsk Raion (Belarus) | 1 – 0 | (Russia) Olimp Moscow Oblast |
|---|---|---|
| Savostyonok 89' | Report |

Stadio Comunale Delle Terme, Abano Terme
Referee: Artur Soares (Portugal)
24 June 2013
17:30

| Catalonia (Spain) | 2 – 2 | Southeast Bulgaria |
|---|---|---|
| Caballe 11'; Muñoz 65' | Report | Bangeev 36'; Dimitrov 63' |

Nuovo Stadio Comunale, Este
Referee: Wim Smet (Belgium)
27 June 2013
17:30

| Southeast Bulgaria | 0 – 1 | (Belarus) Isloch Minsk Raion |
|---|---|---|
| | Report | Lynko 50' |

Stadio Comunale Vallini, Piove di Sacco
Referee: Laurent Kopriwa (Luxembourg)
27 June 2013
17:30

| Catalonia (Spain) | 1 – 0 | (Russia) Olimp Moscow Oblast |
|---|---|---|
| Dominguez 11' | Report |

Stadio Maurizio Sacco, Bagnoli di Sopra
Referee: Vlado Glođović (Serbia)

=== Final ===
29 June 2013
17:00

| Veneto (Italy) | 0 – 0 (aet) (5 – 4 p) | (Spain) Catalonia |
|---|---|---|
| | Report |

Stadio Comunale Delle Terme, Abano Terme
Referee: Artur Soares (Portugal)

2013 UEFA Regions' Cup
Winners

Veneto

== Top goalscorers ==
7 goals

- (Hungary) Imre Domokos

5 goals

- (Russia) Sergei Orlov

4 goals

- (Italy) Franco Ballarini
- (Russia) Roman Asadov
- (Hungary) Krisztián Less
- (Northern Ireland) Paul Maguire
- (Turkey) Yakup Alkan
- (Israel) Shadi Hammudi

3 goals

- (Bosnia and Herzegovina) Nedžad Džanić
- (Spain) Boris Garros
- (Italy) Stefano Guandalini
- (Russia) Aleksandr Fuflygin
- (Northern Ireland) Ryan Moffatt
- (Hungary) Balázs Pálvölgyi
- (Bulgaria) Hristo Bangeev
- (Romania) Mihai Ene
- (Romania) Adrian Puiulet
- (Turkey) Recep Hazır
- (Germany) Kuengíenda Onesi
- (Serbia) Nikola Donevski

== See also ==
- UEFA Regions' Cup
