= Portela das Cabras =

Coordinates: 41.670°N 8.502°W

Portela das Cabras, also known as "Portela de Penela", is a former civil parish in the municipality of Vila Verde, Portugal. In 2013, the parish merged into the new parish Ribeira do Neiva. It was the seat of an extinct Portuguese municipality, established by King Afonso III. In 1855 it was transformed into a parish of the Vila Verde Municipality. "Portela das cabras" literally means "pass of the goats". The region had many mountain passes and whenever they became inhabited the name "Portela" was to be given to the settlements therein.

The parish has an area of 2,34 km^{2} and 256 inhabitants (2001). The population density is 109,4/km^{2}.

The old Roman road linking Braga to Astorga went through Portela das Cabras. Remains of this road can be found in the parish.

Portela das Cabras is located in the drainage basin of the rivers Neiva and Cávado.
