= Oleksandr Melashchenko =

Ukrainian footballer

Oleksandr Melaschenko
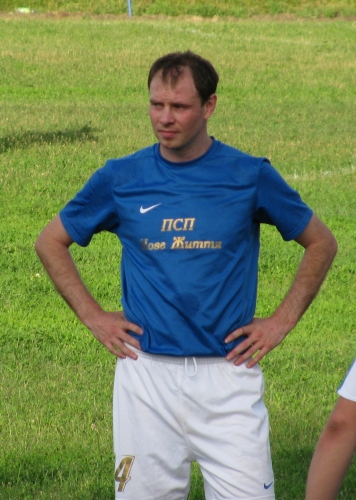

Personal information
- Full name: Oleksandr Petrovych Melaschenko
- Date of birth: 13 December 1978 (age 47)
- Place of birth: Poltava, Ukrainian SSR Soviet Union
- Height: 1.80 m (5 ft 11 in)
- Position: Striker

Team information
- Current team: Ukraine U21 (assistant coach)

Youth career
- Vorskla Poltava

Senior career*
Years	Team	Apps	(Gls)
1997–2001	Vorskla Poltava	53	(10)
1997–2000	→ Vorskla-2 Poltava (loan)	50	(17)
2001–2003	Dynamo Kyiv	56	(19)
2001–2003	→ Dynamo-2 Kyiv (loan)	28	(16)
2004–2006	Dnipro Dnipropetrovsk	58	(13)
2004	→ Dnipro-2 Dnipropetrovsk (loan)	3	(0)
2007–2009	Kryvbas Kryvyi Rih	50	(4)
2010	Metalurh Zaporizhia	0	(0)
2010–2013	Nove Zhyttya Andriivka	22	(17)
2015	Dynamo Reshetylivka	1	(0)

International career^{‡}
2001–2003	Ukraine	16	(3)

Managerial career
- 2013–2014: Nove Zhyttya Andriivka
- 2016–: Ukraine U21 (assistant)
- * Club domestic league appearances and goals as of 21 July 2009 ‡ National team caps and goals as of 21 July 2009

Oleksandr Melaschenko (Ukrainian: Олександр Петрович Мелащенко; born 13 December 1978) is a Ukrainian footballer. He played as a striker.

== Career ==
In 2013, he played for FC Nove Zhyttya in the Poltava Oblast league. His previous clubs include Vorskla Poltava, Dynamo Kyiv, Dnipro Dnipropetrovsk and Kryvbas Kryvyi Rih and ended his professional career with Metalurh Zaporizhzhia. In 2001, playing for Dynamo Kyiv, he was voted as the third best Ukrainian Footballer of the Year, after Andriy Shevchenko, and Hennady Zubov.

Melaschenko has made 16 appearances for the Ukraine national football team, and participated in the 2002 FIFA World Cup qualification rounds.

He took part in the "golden match" of the Poltava region championship in 2010 (Komsomolsk, November 20, 2010), in which he scored a goal, but Nove Zhyttia was defeated by Velyka Bahachka with a score of 4:3."

=== International goals ===
Scores and results list Ukraine's goal tally first.

No	Date	Venue	Opponent	Score	Result	Competition
1.	28 February 2001	GSZ Stadium, Larnaca, Cyprus	Cyprus	1–0	3–4	Cyprus International Football Tournament
2.	15 August 2001	Skonto Stadium, Riga, Latvia	Latvia	1–0	1–0	Friendly match
3.	20 November 2002	Anton Malatinský Stadium, Trnava, Slovakia	Slovakia	1–1	1–1	Friendly match
