= FC Nove Zhyttia Andriivka =

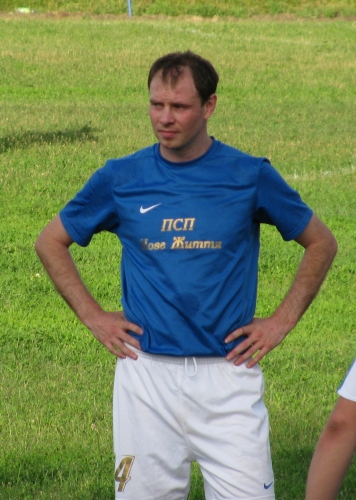
Oleksandr Melaschenko in uniform of Nove Zhyttya

FC Nove Zhyttya Andriivka is an amateur Ukrainian football club from Andriivka, Poltava Raion, Poltava Oblast. The head coach of the senior team between 2013 and 2014 was Oleksandr Melaschenko.

The club was founded in 2008 as a representation of a farming company "Nove Zhyttya". In 2010 the team joined Oleksandr Melaschenko along with brothers of Ruslan Rotan, Oleksiy and Petro.

In 2011 Nove Zhyttya Andriyivka won the Amateur Championship of Ukraine. The club participated in the 2013 UEFA Regions' Cup.

The club only played two seasons at the national amateur competitions.

== Europe competitions ==
Games of Nove Zhytya in UEFA competitions
Season	Competition	Round	Club	Home	Away	Aggregate
2013	UEFA Regions' Cup	Group 7	(Slovenia) MNZ Ljubljana	3–0	—	3rd
2013	UEFA Regions' Cup	Group 7	(Belgium) Ardennes	0–1	—	3rd
2013	UEFA Regions' Cup	Group 7	Catalonia	1–4	—	3rd

== Sources ==
- Lomov, Anatolii; Kryvyi, Anatolii (2013), Полтава футбольная от А до Я ( 1909 - 2013) [Poltava football club from A to Z (1909 - 2013)] (in Russian), Poltava: PP Dyvosvit, ISBN 978-617-633-067-7
