= 2003 UEFA Regions' Cup =

UEFA Regions' Cup Germany 2003

Tournament details
- Host country: Germany
- Dates: 22 June – 28 June
- Teams: 8

Final positions
- Champions: (Italy) Piedmont–Aosta Valley (1st title)
- Runners-up: (France) Maine

The 2003 UEFA Regions' Cup was the third UEFA Regions' Cup. It was held in Germany and won by the Piedmont–Aosta Valley team from Italy, which beat France's Maine 2–1 in the final.

== Preliminary round ==
The 40 teams entered were drawn into ten groups of four, with the following countries hosting each group's matches:

Group 1 – Azerbaijan
Group 2 – Belgium
Group 3 – Croatia
Group 4 – Estonia
Group 5 – Hungary
Group 6 – Lithuania
Group 7 – Netherlands
Group 8 – Slovakia
Group 9 – Slovenia
Group 10 – Sweden

Six group winners qualified automatically, while the winners of four randomly drawn groups took part in a playoff for the two remaining places in the tournament final.

=== Group 1 ===
Team	Pld	W	D	L	GF	GA	GD	Pts
(Azerbaijan) Göyəzən FK (H)	3	3	0	0	11	2	+9	9
(Ukraine) Pivdenstal	3	2	0	1	13	1	+12	6
(Greece) Imathia	3	1	0	2	3	13	−10	3
(Georgia (country)) Tbilisi	3	0	0	3	2	13	−11	0

19 September 2002
Imathia	2 – 1	Tbilisi	Sumqayit
Göyəzən FK	1 – 0	Pivdenstal	Sumqayit
21 September 2002
Pivdenstal	7 – 0	Imathia	Baku
Tbilisi	1 – 5	Göyəzən FK	Baku
23 September 2002
Pivdenstal	6 – 0	Tbilisi	Baku
Göyəzən FK	5 – 1	Imathia	Baku

=== Group 2 ===
Team	Pld	W	D	L	GF	GA	GD	Pts
(Spain) Asturias	3	3	0	0	13	0	+13	9
(Belgium) Ligue Nord (H)	3	2	0	1	9	3	+6	6
Andorra	3	1	0	2	2	12	−10	3
(Finland) South-East	3	0	0	3	3	12	−9	0

15 November 2002
Ligue Nord	5 – 2	South-East	Overpelt
Asturias	7 – 0	Andorra	Overpelt
16 November 2002
South-East	1 – 2	Andorra	Overpelt
Ligue Nord	0 – 1	Asturias	Overpelt
18 November 2002
Andorra	0 – 4	Ligue Nord	Overpelt
South-East	0 – 5	Asturias	Bocholt

=== Group 3 ===
Team	Pld	W	D	L	GF	GA	GD	Pts
(France) Maine	3	1	2	0	9	4	+5	5
(Bulgaria) Veliko Tarnovo	3	1	2	0	7	3	+4	5
(Croatia) Slavonia and Baranja (H)	3	1	2	0	6	3	+3	5
Luxembourg	3	0	0	3	0	12	−12	0

25 September 2002
Slavonia and Baranja	3 – 0	Luxembourg	Osijek
Veliko Tarnovo	2 – 2	Maine	Osijek
27 September 2002
Luxembourg	0 – 4	Veliko Tarnovo	Vinkovci
Maine	2 – 2	Slavonia and Baranja	Vinkovci
29 September 2002
Slavonia and Baranja	1 – 1	Veliko Tarnovo	Vinkovci
Luxembourg	0 – 5	Maine	Vinkovci

=== Group 4 ===
Team	Pld	W	D	L	GF	GA	GD	Pts
(Czech Republic) Central Bohemia	3	3	0	0	12	3	+9	9
(England) Kent	3	1	0	2	5	7	−2	3
San Marino	3	1	0	2	2	5	−3	3
(Estonia) South (H)	3	1	0	2	5	9	−4	3

9 September 2002
Kent	0 – 2	San Marino	Tallinn
South	2 – 5	Central Bohemia	Tallinn
11 September 2002
Kent	1 – 4	Central Bohemia	Tallinn
South	2 – 0	San Marino	Tallinn
13 September 2002
Central Bohemia	3 – 0	San Marino	Tallinn
South	1 – 4	Kent	Tallinn

=== Group 5 ===
Team	Pld	W	D	L	GF	GA	GD	Pts
(Hungary) Szabolcs Gabona (H)	3	3	0	0	8	2	+6	9
Israel	3	2	0	1	6	4	+2	6
(Federal Republic of Yugoslavia) Montenegro	3	1	0	2	3	5	−2	3
(Moldova) Chişinău	3	0	0	3	2	8	−6	0

1 October 2002
Szabolcs Gabona	2 – 1	Israel	Tiszaújváros
Montenegro	2 – 0	Chişinău	Tiszaújváros
3 October 2002
Israel	3 – 1	Montenegro	Tiszaújváros
Chişinău	1 – 4	Szabolcs Gabona	Tiszaújváros
5 October 2002
Israel	2 – 1	Chişinău	Tiszaújváros
Szabolcs Gabona	2 – 0	Montenegro	Tiszaújváros

=== Group 6 ===
Team	Pld	W	D	L	GF	GA	GD	Pts
(Germany) Württemberg	3	3	0	0	10	1	+9	9
Lesser Poland	3	2	0	1	3	2	+1	6
(Lithuania) Tauragė (H)	3	1	0	2	7	7	0	3
(Belarus) Brest	3	0	0	3	0	10	−10	0

21 September 2002
Lesser Poland	0 – 1	Württemberg	Marijampolė
Tauragė	5 – 0	Brest	Kaunas
23 September 2002
Württemberg	5 – 1	Tauragė	Kaunas
Brest	0 – 1	Lesser Poland	Marijampolė
25 September 2002
Brest	0 – 4	Württemberg	Marijampolė
Lesser Poland	2 – 1	Tauragė	Kaunas

=== Group 7 ===
Team	Pld	W	D	L	GF	GA	GD	Pts
(Netherlands) District Noord (H)	3	3	0	0	6	2	+4	9
(Portugal) Algarve	3	2	0	1	5	2	+3	6
Northern Ireland	3	1	0	2	4	3	+1	3
Malta	3	0	0	3	1	9	−9	0

16 October 2002
Northern Ireland	0 – 1	Algarve	Assen
Malta	1 – 2	District Noord	Assen
17 October 2002
Algarve	3 – 0	Malta	Emmen
District Noord	2 – 0	Northern Ireland	Emmen
19 October 2002
District Noord	2 – 1	Algarve	Hoogeveen
Malta	0 – 4	Northern Ireland	Hoogeveen

=== Group 8 ===
Team	Pld	W	D	L	GF	GA	GD	Pts
(Italy) Piedmont–Aosta Valley	3	2	1	0	6	1	+5	7
(Slovakia) West (H)	3	1	2	0	6	3	+3	5
(Romania) Dacia	3	1	0	2	2	5	−3	3
(Russia) Ural	3	0	1	2	2	7	−5	1

23 September 2002
Ural	0 – 2	Dacia	Nemšová
West	1 – 1	Piedmont–Aosta Valley	Lednické Rovne
25 September 2002
Piedmont–Aosta Valley	2 – 0	Dacia	Považská Bystrica
Ural	2 – 2	West	Nemšová
27 September 2002
Dacia	0 – 3	West	Trenčín
Ural	0 – 3	Piedmont–Aosta Valley	Dubnica nad Váhom

=== Group 9 ===
Team	Pld	W	D	L	GF	GA	GD	Pts
(Switzerland) Ticino	3	3	0	0	8	3	+5	9
(Bosnia and Herzegovina) Entity	3	2	0	1	10	4	+6	6
(Slovenia) MNZ Murska Sobota (H)	3	1	0	2	2	6	−4	3
Liechtenstein	3	0	0	3	2	9	−7	0

17 September 2002
MNZ Murska Sobota	0 – 1	Ticino	Križevci
Liechtenstein	0 – 4	Entity	Lendava
19 September 2002
MNZ Murska Sobota	0 – 4	Entity	Odranci
Liechtenstein	1 – 3	Ticino	Murska Sobota
21 September 2002
MNZ Murska Sobota	2 – 1	Liechtenstein	Beltinci
Ticino	4 – 2	Entity	Križevci

=== Group 10 ===
Team	Pld	W	D	L	GF	GA	GD	Pts
(Sweden) Gothenburg (H)	3	2	1	0	5	0	+5	7
Latvia	3	1	2	0	2	1	+1	5
Republic of Ireland	3	1	0	2	4	2	+2	3
West Scotland	3	0	1	2	1	9	−8	1

8 October 2002
Latvia	1 – 1	West Scotland	Katrineholm
Republic of Ireland	0 – 1	Gothenburg	Gothenburg
10 October 2002
Republic of Ireland	0 – 1	Latvia	Gothenburg
West Scotland	0 – 4	Gothenburg	Gothenburg
12 October 2002
West Scotland	0 – 4	Republic of Ireland	Katrineholm
Latvia	0 – 0	Gothenburg	Gothenburg

== Intermediary round ==
The intermediary playoffs were drawn at random when the preliminary groups were drawn. As there were ten groups but only eight places in the tournament final, four group winners had to play in the intermediary round. The winners of Group 2 were drawn to play the winners of Group 4, whilst Group 8 and Group 10's winners would play each other. The two legs were played in both competing teams' home regions.

Team 1	Agg.	Team 2	1st leg	2nd leg
Piedmont–Aosta Valley (Italy)	2–0	(Sweden) Gothenburg	1–0	1–0
Central Bohemia (Czech Republic)	0–2	(Spain) Asturias	0–1	0–1

First legs

19 March 2003
Piedmont–Aosta Valley	1 – 0	Gothenburg
16 April 2003
Central Bohemia	0 – 1	Asturias

Second legs

9 April 2003
Gothenburg	0 – 1	Piedmont–Aosta Valley
7 May 2003
Asturias	1 – 0	Central Bohemia

== Tournament final ==
Germany was chosen to host the Tournament final, with matches being played from 22-28 June 2003.

=== Group stage ===
The six automatic preliminary group winners and the two intermediary playoff winners (Italy's Piedmont–Aosta Valley and Asturias of Spain) were drawn into two groups of four, with the two group winners advancing to the final.

==== Group A ====
Team	Pld	W	D	L	GF	GA	GD	Pts
(Italy) Piedmont–Aosta Valley	3	2	1	0	7	2	+5	7
(Germany) Württemberg (H)	3	1	1	1	6	4	+2	4
(Switzerland) Ticino	3	1	0	2	1	7	−6	3
(Spain) Asturias	3	0	2	1	2	3	−1	2

22 June 2003
Württemberg	4 – 0	Ticino	Albstadion, Heidenheim an der Brenz
Asturias	1 – 1	Piedmont–Aosta Valley	Albstadion, Heidenheim an der Brenz
24 June 2003
Ticino	0 – 3	Piedmont–Aosta Valley	Jahnstadion, Schwäbisch Gmünd
Württemberg	1 – 1	Asturias	Jahnstadion, Schwäbisch Gmünd
26 June 2003
Ticino	1 – 0	Asturias	Jahnstadion, Schwäbisch Gmünd
Piedmont–Aosta Valley	3 – 1	Württemberg	Carl-Zeiss-Stadion, Oberkochen

==== Group B ====
Team	Pld	W	D	L	GF	GA	GD	Pts
(France) Maine	3	2	0	1	12	6	+6	6
(Hungary) Szabolcs Gabona	3	2	0	1	15	8	+7	6
(Netherlands) District Noord	3	1	1	1	4	9	−5	4
(Azerbaijan) Göyəzən FK	3	0	1	2	5	13	−8	1

22 June 2003
Szabolcs Gabona	3 – 8	Maine	Allgäustadion, Wangen im Allgäu
District Noord	3 – 3	Göyəzən FK	Allgäustadion, Wangen im Allgäu
24 June 2003
Szabolcs Gabona	6 – 0	District Noord	Zeppelinstadion, Friedrichshafen
Maine	4 – 2	Göyəzən FK	Zeppelinstadion, Friedrichshafen
26 June 2003
Göyəzən FK	0 – 6	Szabolcs Gabona	Allgäustadion, Wangen im Allgäu
Maine	0 – 1(abd)	District Noord	Zeppelinstadion, Friedrichshafen

=== Final ===
28 June 2003

Maine (France)	1 – 2	Piedmont–Aosta Valley (Italy)
Kharraz 83'	(Report)	Borgna 24' 29'

Albstadion, Heidenheim an der Brenz
Attendance: ~800
Referee: Kris Hermans (Belgium)

2003 UEFA Regions' Cup
Winners
Piedmont–Aosta Valley

== See also ==
- UEFA Regions' Cup
