= Ribeira do Neiva =

- Civil parish
- Location in Portugal
- Coordinates: 41.694°N 8.491°W
- Country: Portugal
- Region: Norte
- Intermunic. comm.: Cávado
- District: Braga
- Municipality: Vila Verde

Area
  - Total: 33.76 km^{2} (13.03 sq mi)

Population (2011)
  - Total: 3,807
  - Density: 112.8/km^{2} (292.1/sq mi)
- Time zone: UTC+00:00 (WET)
  - Summer (DST): UTC+01:00 (WEST)

Ribeira do Neiva is a civil parish in the municipality of Vila Verde, Portugal. It was formed in 2013 by the merger of the former parishes Duas Igrejas, Rio Mau, Goães, Godinhaços, Pedregais, Azões and Portela das Cabras. The population in 2011 was 3,807, in an area of 33.76 km^{2}.
