= Tower of Penegate =

- Torre de Penegate
- Braga, Cávado, Norte in Portugal
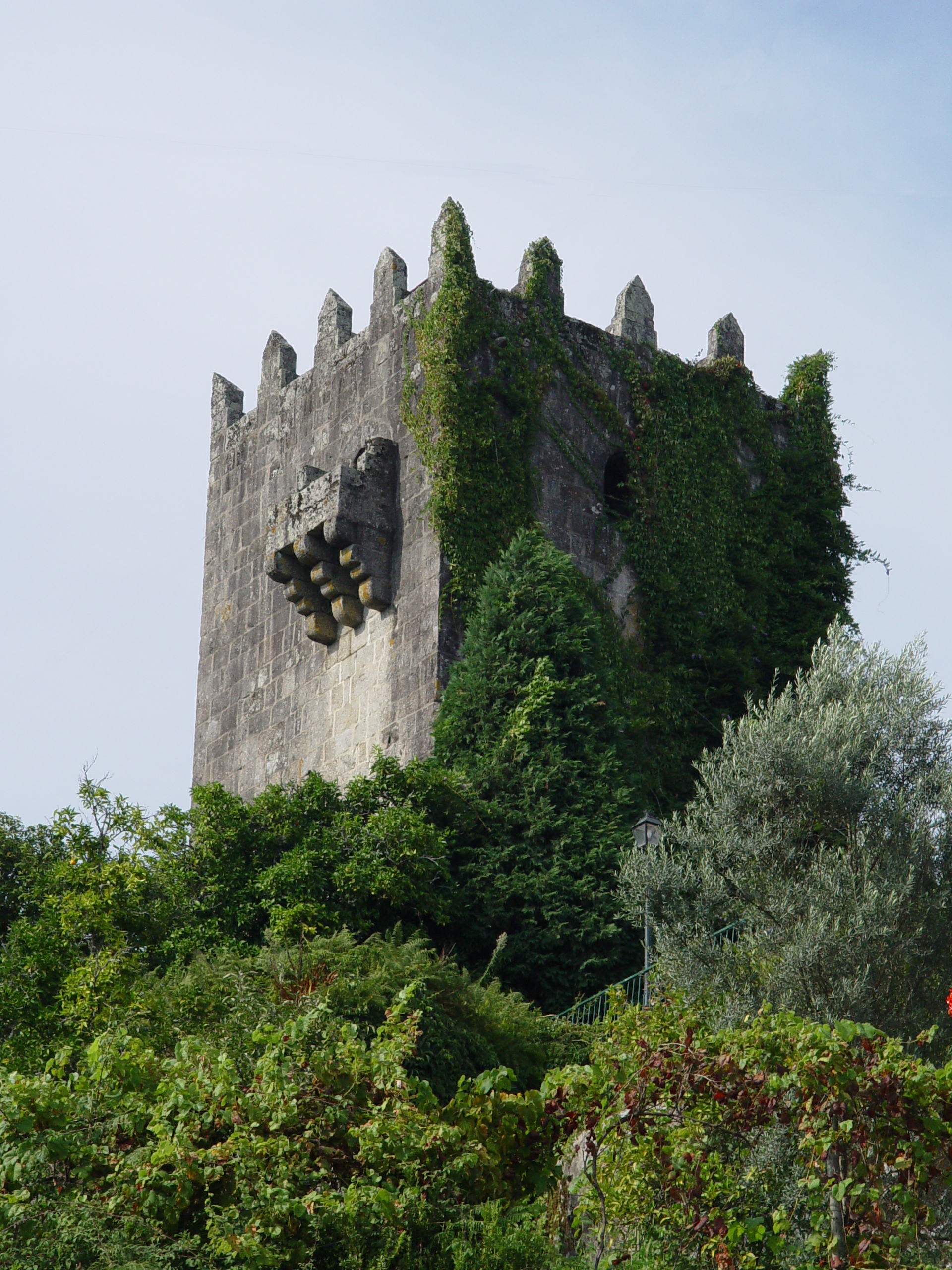
- The Tower of Penegate peaks out from the treeline in the zone of Outeiro

Site information
- Type: Tower
- Owner: Portuguese Republic
- Operator: DRCNorte
- Open to the public: Public

Location
- Coordinates: 41°39′31.73″N 8°29′30.06″W

Site history
- Materials: Stone, Wood, Reinforced concrete

The Tower of Penegate (Portuguese: Torre de Penegate), is a 3-storey quadrilateral tower, located in the civil parish of São Miguel de Carreiras in municipality of Vila Verde, in the northern region of Portugal.

== History ==
The first reference to the toponymy of Penegate came in 1064, substituting the former name of Penela. Regardless, the area continued to pertain to a dominant hilltop, where, later, the Gothic tower known as Penegate was founded. There are still some concerns about whether this structure had a Roman, or proto-Roman, foundation, normally attributed to D. Egas Pais de Penegate, a trusted man of Count Henry of Burgundy, as defended by some authors.

The tower was begun in 1322, by Mem Rodrigues de Vasconcelos, alcalde-mor of the Castle of Guimarães, after receiving a royal licence (for a domus fortis) from King Denis on 5 October 1322. Mem Rodrigues requested the dispatch, owing to problems found in occupying his title in the region of Entre-Homem-e-Cávado, the zone where royal judiciary had difficulties in imposing is authority owing to his uncle, Pedro Anes de Vasconcelos.

By 1668, Miguel Valadares, who was then the proprietor of the tower, died. The Chapel of Nossa Senhora da Penha was constructed in the 17th century, under his initiative (from the inscription along the principal facade). This nobleman, deacon of Guimarães and judge in Braga, was the descendant and heir of the building, and incorporated the chapel as a burial site.

In 1907, the tower was acquired by the father of the current property-owner.

In 1939, a house was constructed along the lateral wall of the tower.

The tower's age meant that local authorities were interested in classifying the tower, as a form of attracting local activity to the region. On 20 August 1986, municipal authorities deliberated a motion to propose to the IPPC, that the tower be listed as a National Monument. This was followed on 15 November 1988, with a proposal by the Câmara Municipal of Vila Verde to classify the structure. The process was opened by the president of the IPPC on 20 June 1990. But, many of these initiatives met with success, and Penegate remained unclassified by the beginning of the 20th century.

On 27 December 2011, the DRCNorte (Direcção Regional de Cultura do Norte) re-proposed classifying the structure as an MIP, or Monumento de Interesse Público (Monument of Public Interest). The proposal was met with a favorable response from the National Council for Culture SPAA on 23 January 2012. On 28 September 2012, an announcement (13494/2012), was published in the Diário da República (Série II, 189), relative to the decision on classifying the monument as MIP, and established a special zone of protection for the keep.

== Architecture ==
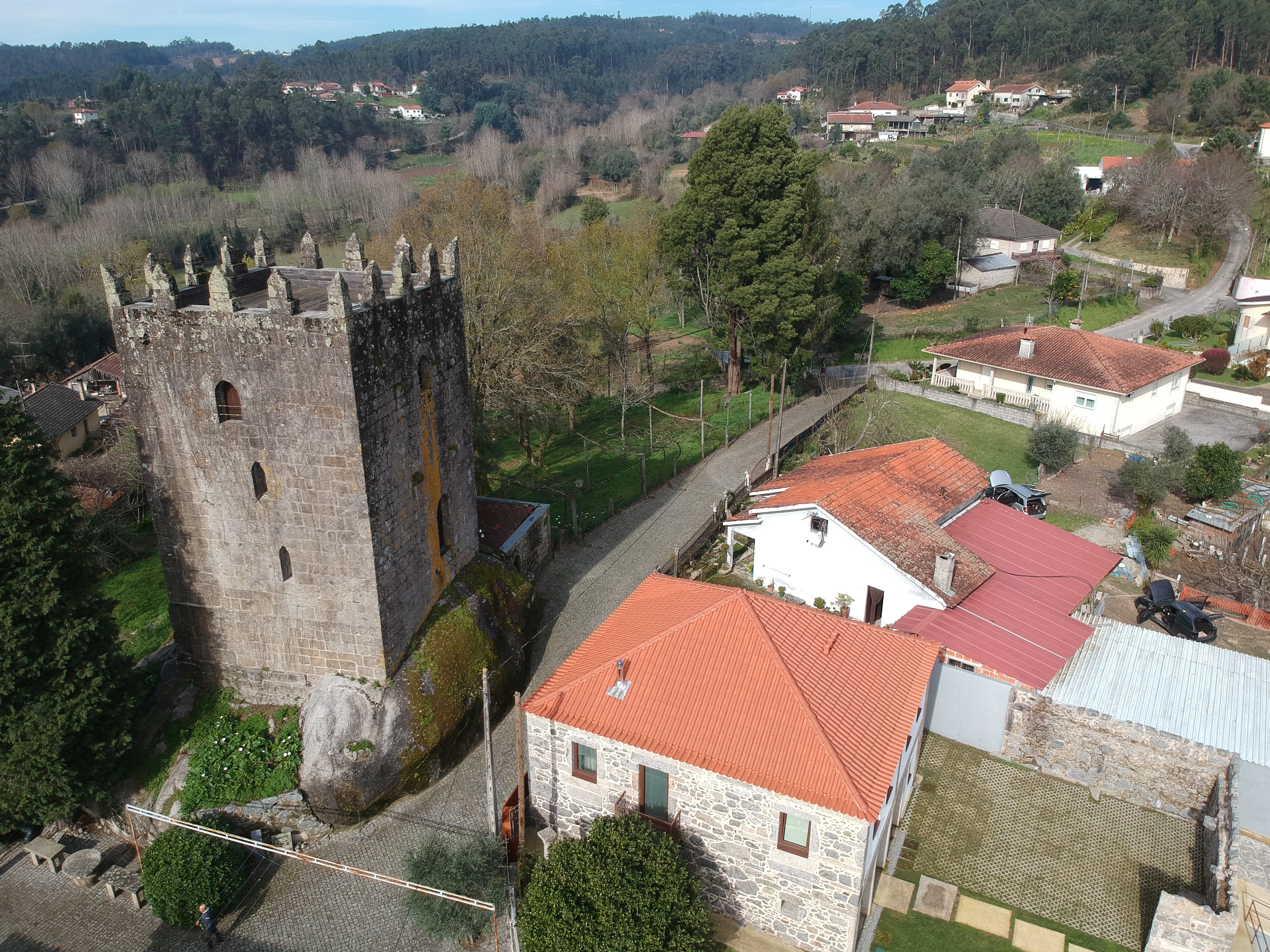

The tower is located in a rural context, alongside a house that was recently constructed, in addition to the Chapel of Penha. It is a Baroque temple, of small dimension, conserving a modern triptych altarpiece, with the image of the Virgin Mary in the centre, flanked by Saint John and Saint Anthony, in painted panels.

The tower is located over a clifftop, over a hilltop escarpment that dominates the valley of Febros. Access to the site is made along a very steep pedestrian trail. Along the valley, there once existed a medieval road, based on a former Roman via, which connected Braga and Valença.

A rectangular tower, consisting of a three-story facade, with rooftop terrace. The entrance-way, consisting of a Roman arch, is situated in the level ground, although it is likely that access was made by a movable staircase. The first floors has several high and long cracks. In the western facade is a balcony with machicolations and, along the other facades are tall rectangular windows. Along the eastern wall is a window with rounded frame.

Within the interior of the tower are several inscriptions, likely Gothic in nature, but of complex lettering.
