= David Braig =

German footballer

Personal information
- Date of birth: 22 July 1991 (age 35)
- Place of birth: Germany
- Height: 1.85 m (6 ft 1 in)
- Position: Striker

Team information
- Current team: Stuttgarter Kickers
- Number: 22

Senior career*
Years	Team	Apps	(Gls)
–2019	SSV Ulm 1846	198	(80)
2020–	Stuttgarter Kickers	135	(48)

International career
- Württemberg
- * Club domestic league appearances and goals as of 26 June 2026

David Braig (born 22 July 1991) is a German footballer who last played as a striker for Stuttgarter Kickers.

== Early life ==
Braig is a native of Ehingen, Germany.

== Youth career ==
Braig joined the youth academy of German side SSV Ulm 1846 at the age of fourteen. He then played for the club's under-19 team and made his league debut for the first team on 22 May 2010.

== Senior club career ==
Braig started his career with German side SSV Ulm 1846, where he was second captain of the club, was described as "face of SSV Ulm 1846 football", and was their longest-serving player. After the club was declared insolvent in 2014, he helped the club achieve fifth place the next season. He then helped them achieve promotion and was regarded as a fan favorite. In 2020, he signed for German side Stuttgarter Kickers, where he was regarded as an important played for the club. He helped them achieve promotion.

== International career ==
Braig played for the Württemberg regional football team at the UEFA Regions Cup.

== Style of play ==
Braig mainly operates as a striker and was known for his strength, receiving comparisons to Ivory Coast international Didier Drogba.

== Personal life ==
Braig has regarded Brazil international Ronaldo as his football idol.
