= FC Morkovice =

Morkovice
- Full name: FC Morkovice
- Founded: 1943
- Ground: Stadion v Morkovicích
- League: Regional Championship (Zlín)
- 2022–23: 9th

FC Morkovice is a Czech football club located in Morkovice-Slížany in the Zlín Region. It currently plays in the fifth tier of Czech football. The club has played five seasons in the Czech Fourth Division, most recently in the 2012–13 season. Morkovice has taken part in the Czech Cup numerous times, reaching the second round in 2005–06. They have also had success in the Zlín Region Governor's Cup, winning the cup in 2012 and finishing as runners-up in 2018.

The club has been promoted to the Czech Fourth Division on three separate occasions. After winning the regional championship in the 2001–02 season they spent two seasons there. Despite being relegated in 2004, the club won the 2004–05 regional championship by a large margin to return to the Fourth Division. In the 2005–06 season, Morkovice finished a club record 4th place, but at the end of the 2006–07 season, the team was relegated once again. In 2012 Morkovice celebrated a double, as they won the regional championship league competition, as well as the Zlín Region Governor's Cup.

Morkovice were runners-up in the 2017–18 Zlín Region Governor's Cup, losing in a penalty shoot-out to rivals FK Luhačovice in the final.
