= Sandarna BK =

Swedish football club

- Full name: Sandarna Bollklubb
- Nickname: SBK
- Ground: Gröna vallen Gothenburg; Sweden
- Chairman: Jim Holmelin
- League: Division 4 Göteborg
- 2019: Division 4 Göteborg b, 5th
Home colours

Sandarna BK is a Swedish football club located in Gothenburg.

== Background ==
Sandarna BK currently plays in Division 4 Göteborg B which is the sixth tier of Swedish football. They play their home matches at the Gröna vallen in Göteborg.

The club is affiliated to Göteborgs Fotbollförbund. Sandarna BK represented Sweden in the 2011 UEFA Regions' Cup but were knocked out in the Preliminary Round in Macedonia after playing 3 matches in Group C. They have competed in the Svenska Cupen on 20 occasions and have played 27 matches in the competition. Former stats Ville Viljannen, Dennis Pavlovic, Kenneth Persson, Peter Sörhall, Karoly Fenesan.

Ledgens of Sandarna Fritz Sandin Kent "KK" Kristiansson and also Morgan Kihlberg.

== Season to season ==
In their most successful period Sandarna BK competed in the following divisions:

Season	Level	Division	Section	Position	Movements
1945–46	Tier 3	Division 3	Västsvenska Södra	6th	
1946–47	Tier 3	Division 3	Västsvenska Södra	2nd	Relegation Playoffs

In recent seasons Sandarna BK have competed in the following divisions:

Season	Level	Division	Section	Position	Movements
1999	Tier 5	Division 4	Göteborg B	4th	
2000	Tier 5	Division 4	Göteborg B	9th	
2001	Tier 5	Division 4	Göteborg B	10th	
2002	Tier 5	Division 4	Göteborg B	8th	
2003	Tier 5	Division 4	Göteborg B	12th	Relegated
2004	Tier 6	Division 5	Göteborg B	6th	
2005	Tier 6	Division 5	Göteborg B	6th	
2006*	Tier 7	Division 5	Göteborg B	1st	Promoted
2007	Tier 6	Division 4	Göteborg B	6th	
2008	Tier 6	Division 4	Göteborg B	3rd	
2009	Tier 6	Division 4	Göteborg B	2nd	
2010	Tier 6	Division 4	Göteborg B	4th	
2011	Tier 6	Division 4	Göteborg B	8th	
2012	Tier 6	Division 4	Göteborg B	6th	
2013	Tier 6	Division 4	Göteborg B	11th	Relegated
2014	Tier 7	Division 5	Göteborg B	11th	Relegated
2015	Tier 8	Division 6	Göteborg C	4th	
2016	Tier 8	Division 6	Göteborg C	2nd	
2017	Tier 8	Division 6	Göteborg C	1st	Promoted
2018	Tier 7	Division 5	Göteborg B	1st	Promoted
2019	Tier 6	Division 4	Göteborg B	5th	
2020	Tier 6	Division 4	Göteborg B		

* League restructuring in 2006 resulted in a new division being created at Tier 3 and subsequent divisions dropping a level.
