= Zeppelinstadion =

Football stadium

Coordinates: 47°40′6″N 9°28′54″E

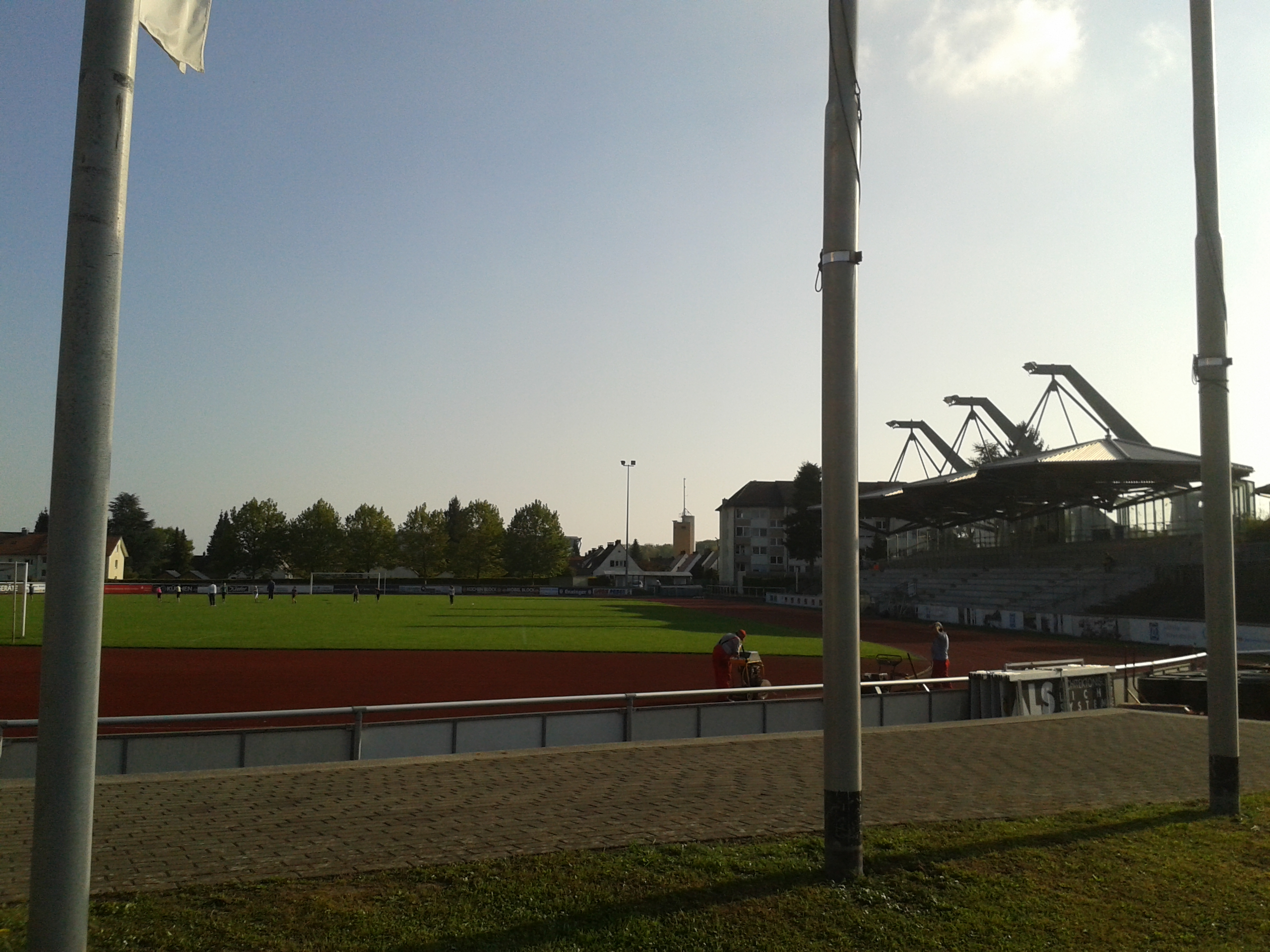
- Interactive map of Zeppelinstadion
- Location: Friedrichshafen, Germany
- Capacity: 12,000

Construction
- Renovated: 1998

Tenant
- VfB Friedrichshafen

Zeppelinstadion is a multi-use stadium in Friedrichshafen, Germany. It is currently used mostly for football matches. Since 1919 it is the home stadium of VfB Friedrichshafen. The stadium is able to hold 12,000 people.
