= Qaraçala =

- Municipality
- Location within Azerbaijan
- Coordinates: 39°48′28″N 48°56′02″E
- Country: Azerbaijan
- Rayon: Salyan

Population
  - Total: 5,071
- Time zone: UTC+4 (AZT)
  - Summer (DST): UTC+5 (AZT)

Qaraçala (also, Karachala) is a village and municipality in the Salyan Rayon of Azerbaijan. It has a population of 5,071. The municipality consists of the villages of Qaraçala and Çadırlı.

== Sport ==
A representative football team played in the UEFA Regions’ Cup 2013.
