= Vila Verde =

- Municipality
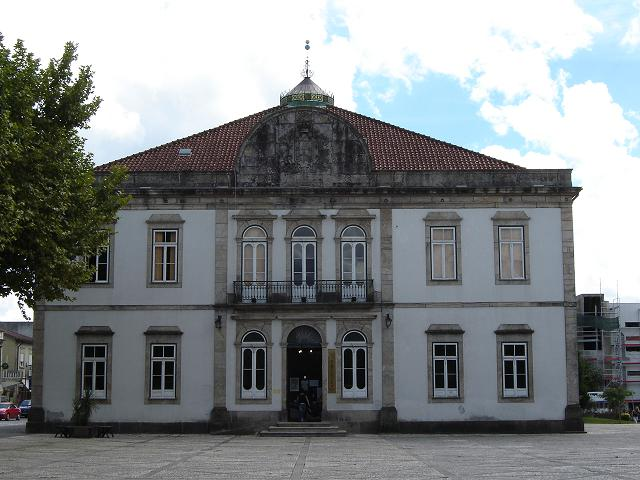

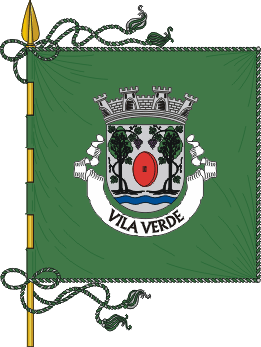
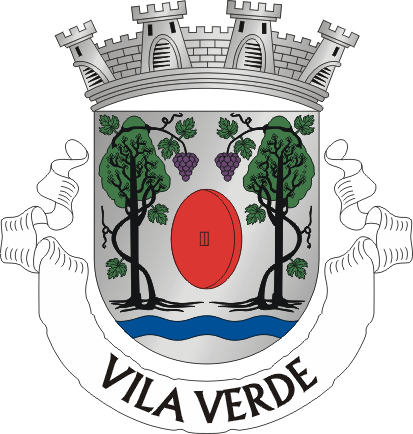
- Flag Coat of arms
- Interactive map of Vila Verde
- Coordinates: 41°39′N 8°26′W
- Country: Portugal
- Region: Norte
- Intermunic. comm.: Cávado
- District: Braga
- Parishes: 33

Government
  - President: Júlia Fernandes (PSD)

Area
  - Total: 228.67 km^{2} (88.29 sq mi)

Population (2021)
  - Total: 46,446
  - Density: 203.11/km^{2} (526.06/sq mi)
- Time zone: UTC+00:00 (WET)
  - Summer (DST): UTC+01:00 (WEST)
- Website: www.cm-vilaverde.pt

Vila Verde (Portuguese pronunciation: [ˈvilɐ ˈveɾðɨ]) is a municipality in the district of Braga in Portugal. The population in 2021 was 46,446, in an area of 228.67 km^{2}.

Vila Verde's current mayor, as of 26 September 2021, is Júlia Fernandes of the Social Democratic Party. She succeeded António Vilela of the same party. The municipal holiday is 13 June.

The county of Vila Verde has a little over 150 years of existence and is one of the biggest counties in the Minho Province.

== Parishes ==
Administratively, the municipality is divided into 33 civil parishes (freguesias):

- Aboim da Nóbrega e Gondomar
- Atiães
- Cabanelas
- Carreiras (São Miguel e Santiago)
- Cervães
- Coucieiro
- Dossãos
- Escariz (São Mamede e São Martinho)
- Esqueiros, Nevogilde e Travassós
- Freiriz
- Gême
- Lage
- Lanhas
- Loureira
- Marrancos e Arcozelo
- Moure
- Oleiros
- Oriz (Santa Marinha e São Miguel)
- Parada de Gatim
- Pico
- Pico de Regalados, Gondiães e Mós
- Ponte
- Ribeira do Neiva
- Sabariz
- Sande, Vilarinho, Barros e Gomide
- São Miguel do Prado
- Soutelo
- Turiz
- Vade
- Valbom (São Pedro), Passô e Valbom (São Martinho)
- Valdreu
- Vila de Prado
- Vila Verde e Barbudo

== Main sights ==
Vila Verde and surrounding region have many historical monuments.

- Penegate Tower

== Gallery ==
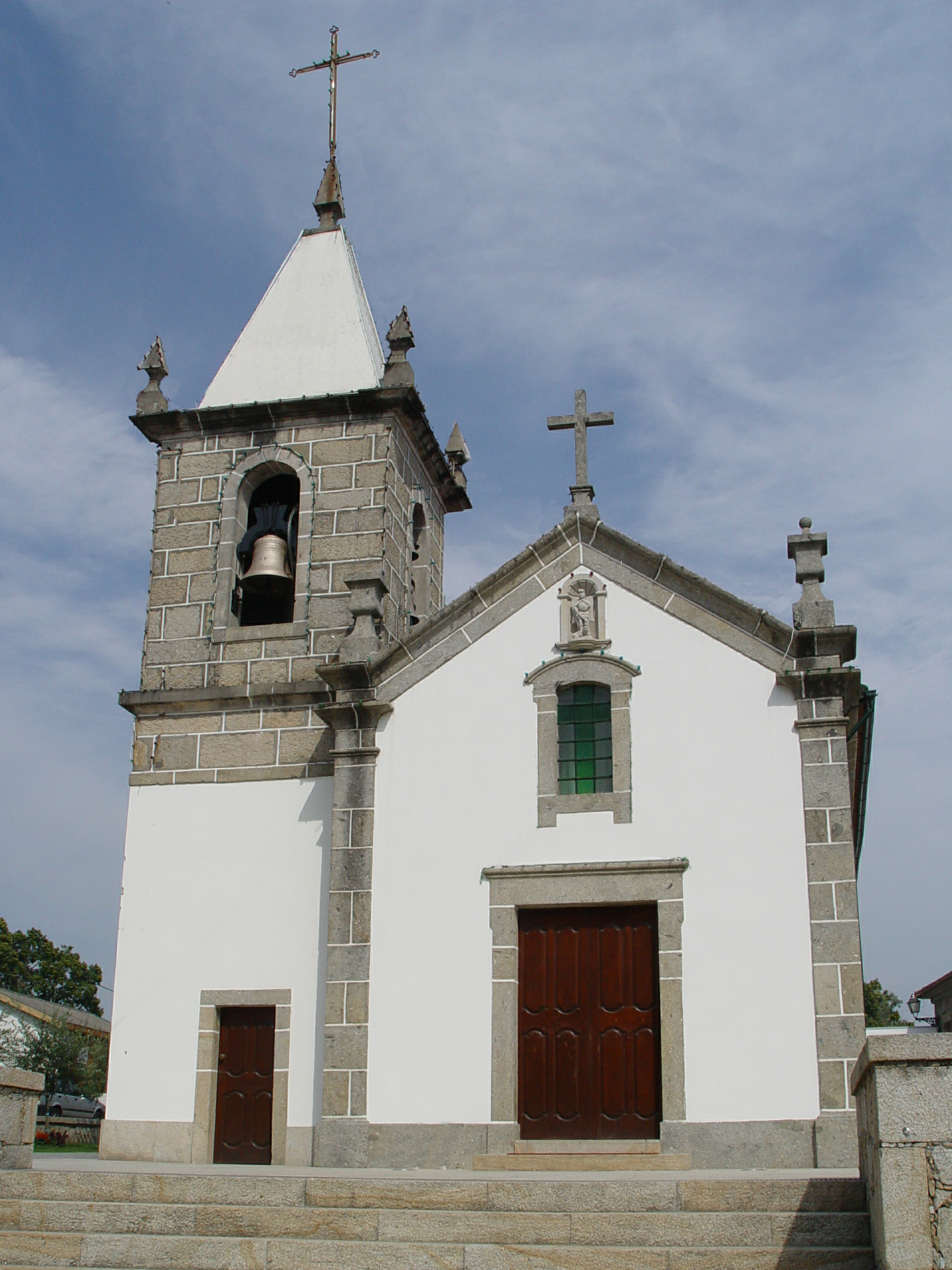
Saint Michael's church, Carreiras

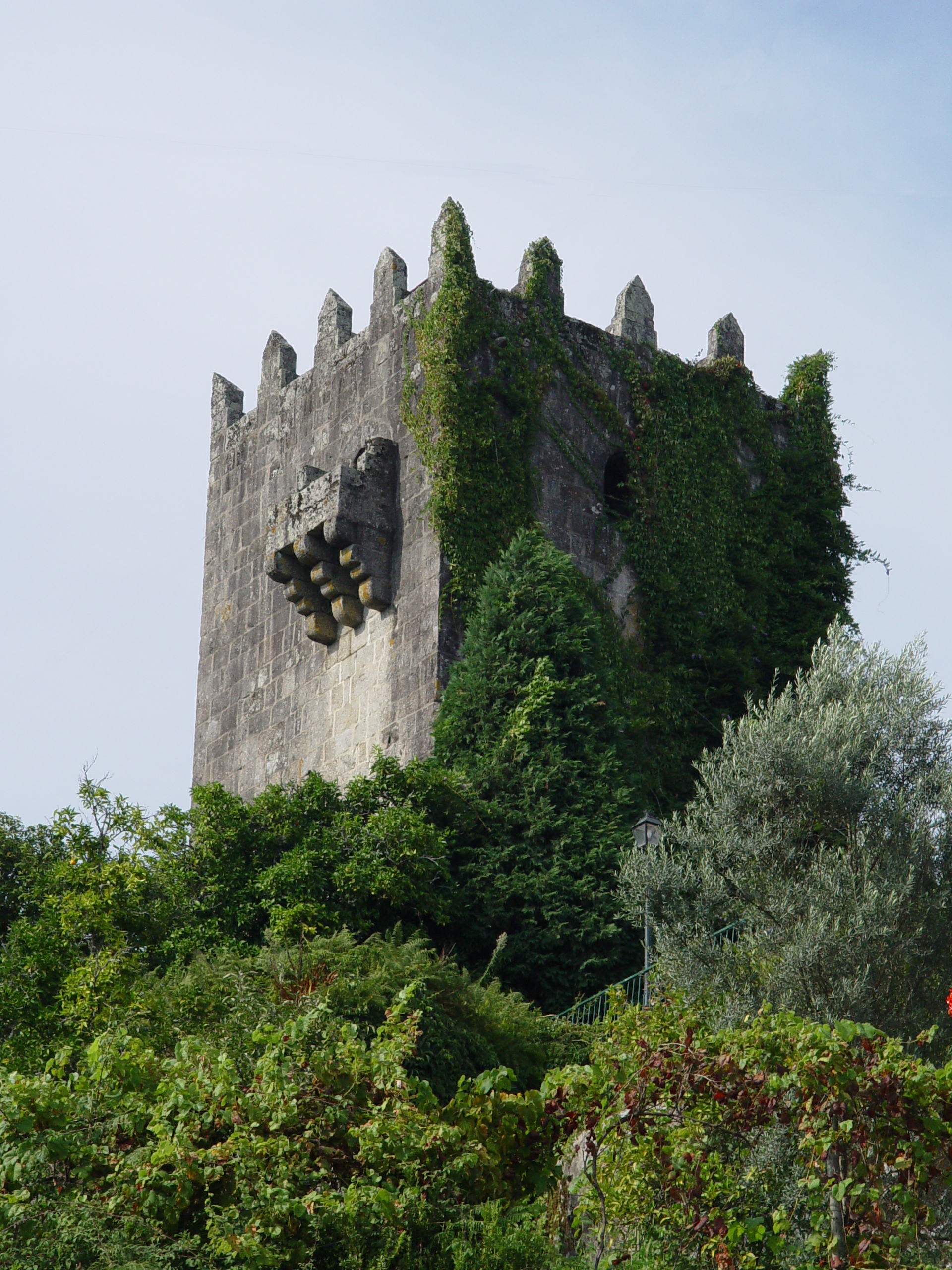
Penegate tower

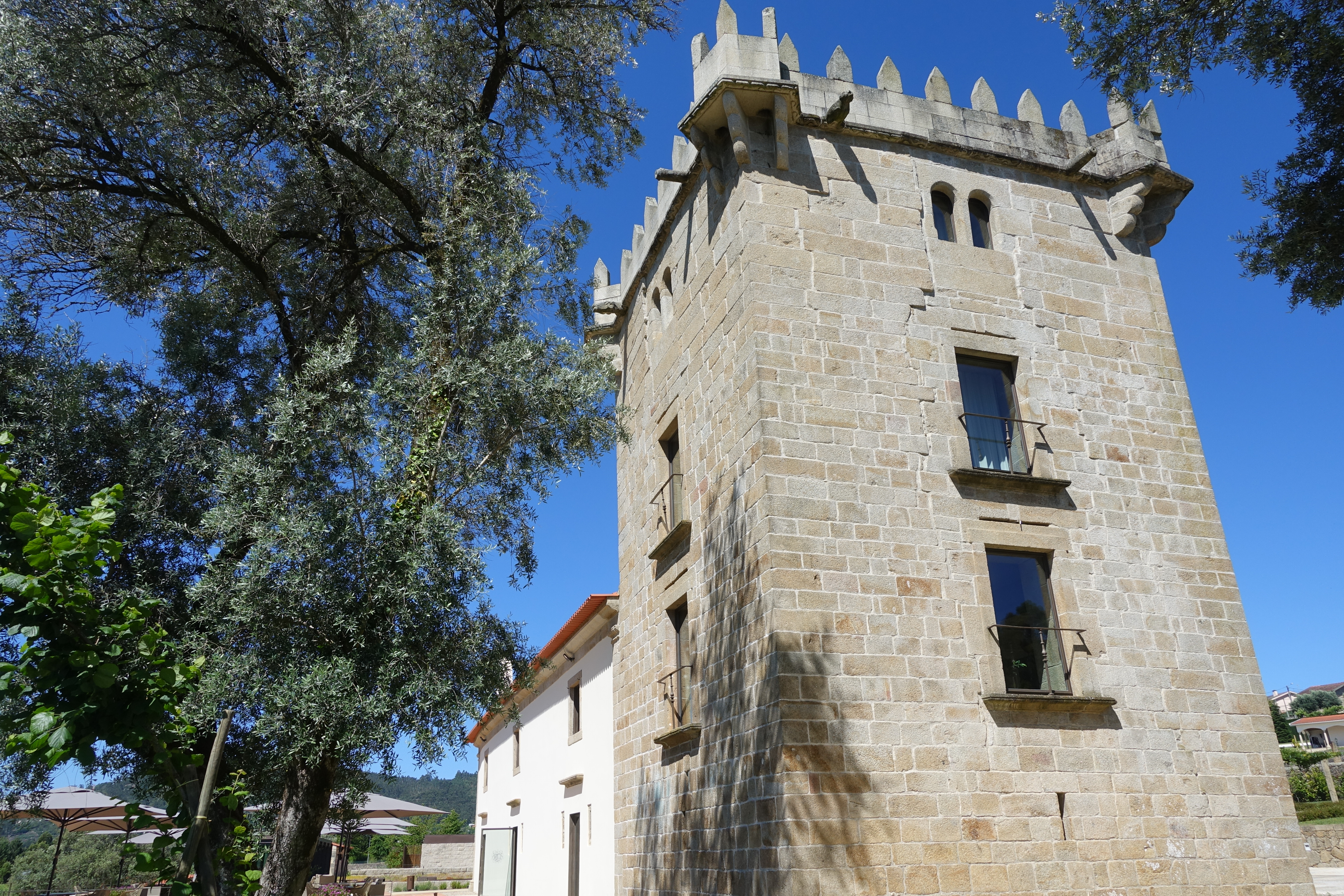
Gomariz tower

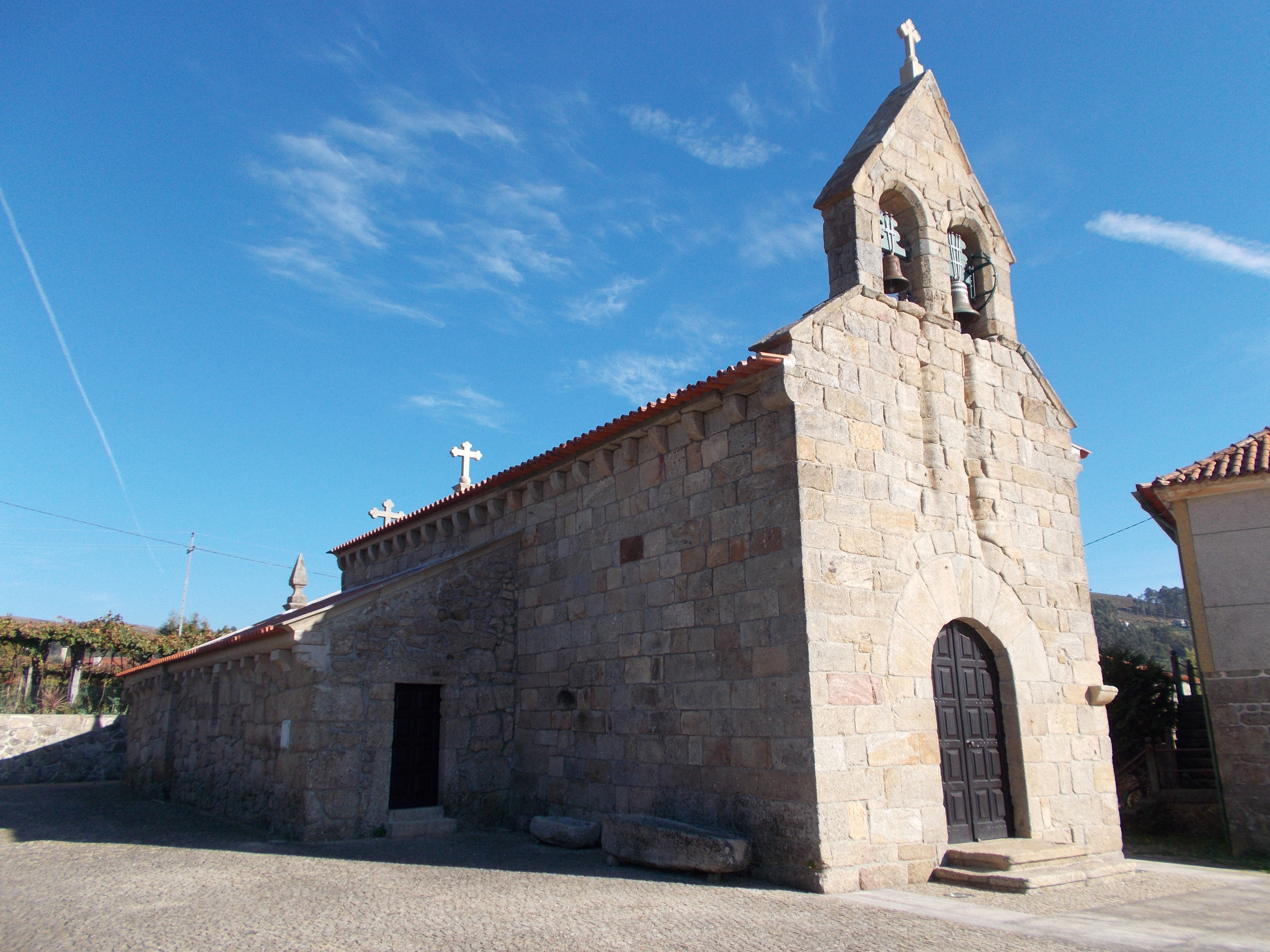
Pedregais church

== Notable people ==
- Augusto Gama (born 1970) a former footballer with 484 club caps and a manager
- Bruno Gama (born 1987) a professional footballer with over 440 club caps
