= Morkovice-Slížany =

- Town
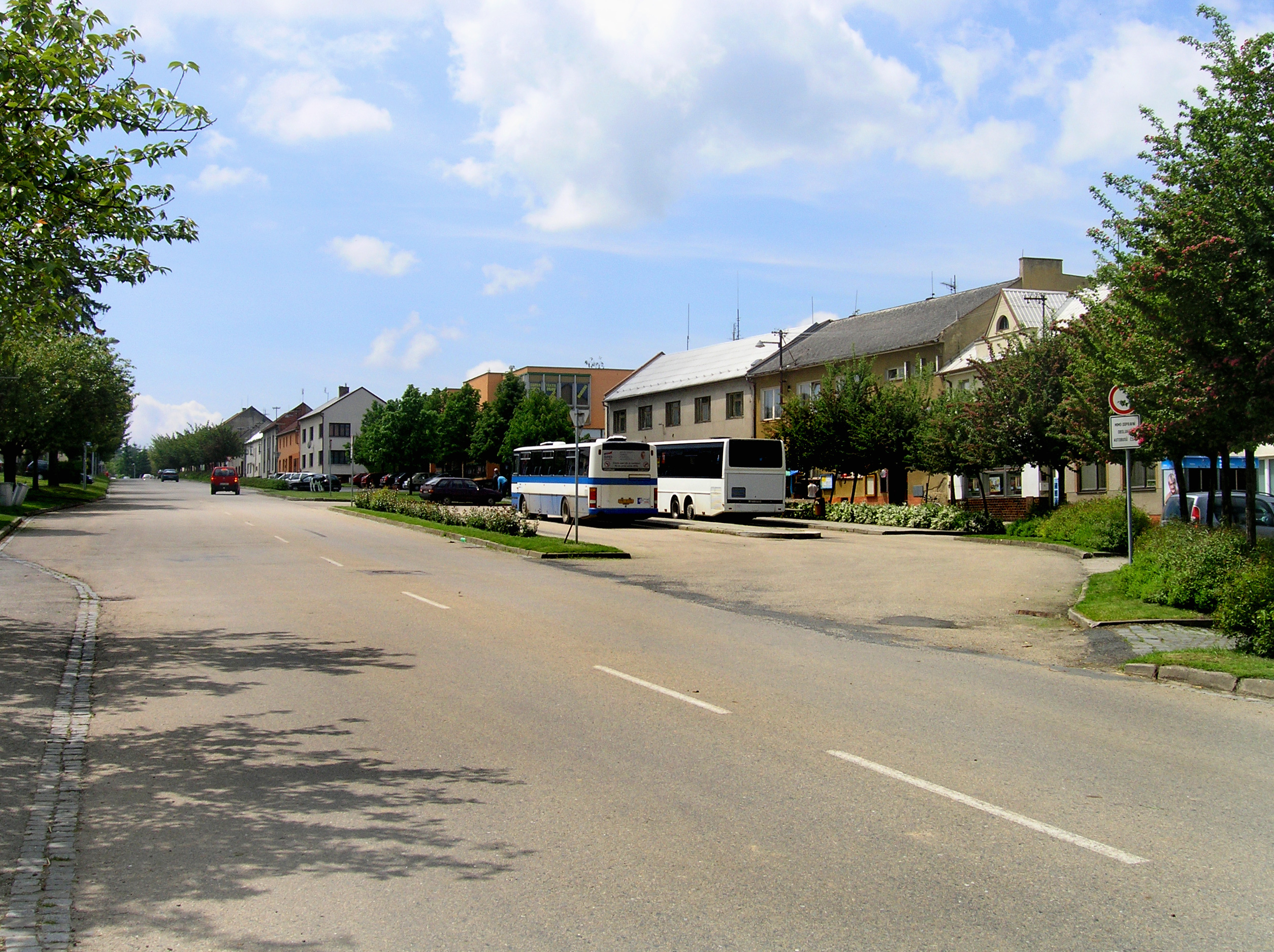
- Main square

- Flag Coat of arms

- Location in the Czech Republic
- Coordinates: 49°14′53″N 17°12′28″E
- Country: Czech Republic
- Region: Zlín
- District: Kroměříž
- First mentioned: 1222

Government
  - Mayor: Pavel Horák

Area
  - Total: 21.07 km^{2} (8.14 sq mi)
- Elevation: 292 m (958 ft)

Population (2026-01-01)
  - Total: 2,998
  - Density: 142.3/km^{2} (368.5/sq mi)
- Time zone: UTC+1 (CET)
  - Summer (DST): UTC+2 (CEST)
- Postal code: 768 33
- Website: www.morkovice-slizany.cz

Morkovice-Slížany (Czech pronunciation: [ˈmorkovɪtsɛ ˈsliːʒanɪ]) is a town in Kroměříž District in the Zlín Region of the Czech Republic. It has about 3,000 inhabitants.

== Administrative division ==
Morkovice-Slížany consists of two municipal parts (in brackets population according to the 2021 census):

- Morkovice (2,422)
- Slížany (355)

== Geography ==
Morkovice-Slížany is located about 14 kilometres (9 mi) southwest of Kroměříž and 40 km (25 mi) east of Brno. It lies in the Litenčice Hills. The highest point is the hill Kleštěnec at 498 m (1,634 ft) above sea level. The stream Morkovický potok flows through the town and supplies three fishponds in the territory.

== History ==
The first written mention of Morkovice is from 1222. Slížany was first mentioned in 1353. Morkovice-Slížany was created by merger of the municipalities of Morkovice and Slížany in 1960.

== Demographics ==
Historical population

Year	Pop.	±%
1869	1,981	—
1880	2,236	+12.9%
1890	2,379	+6.4%
1900	2,587	+8.7%
1910	2,735	+5.7%

Year	Pop.	±%
1921	2,931	+7.2%
1930	3,004	+2.5%
1950	2,568	−14.5%
1961	2,683	+4.5%
1970	2,528	−5.8%

Year	Pop.	±%
1980	2,685	+6.2%
1991	2,736	+1.9%
2001	2,812	+2.8%
2011	2,837	+0.9%
2021	2,777	−2.1%

Source: Censuses

== Transport ==
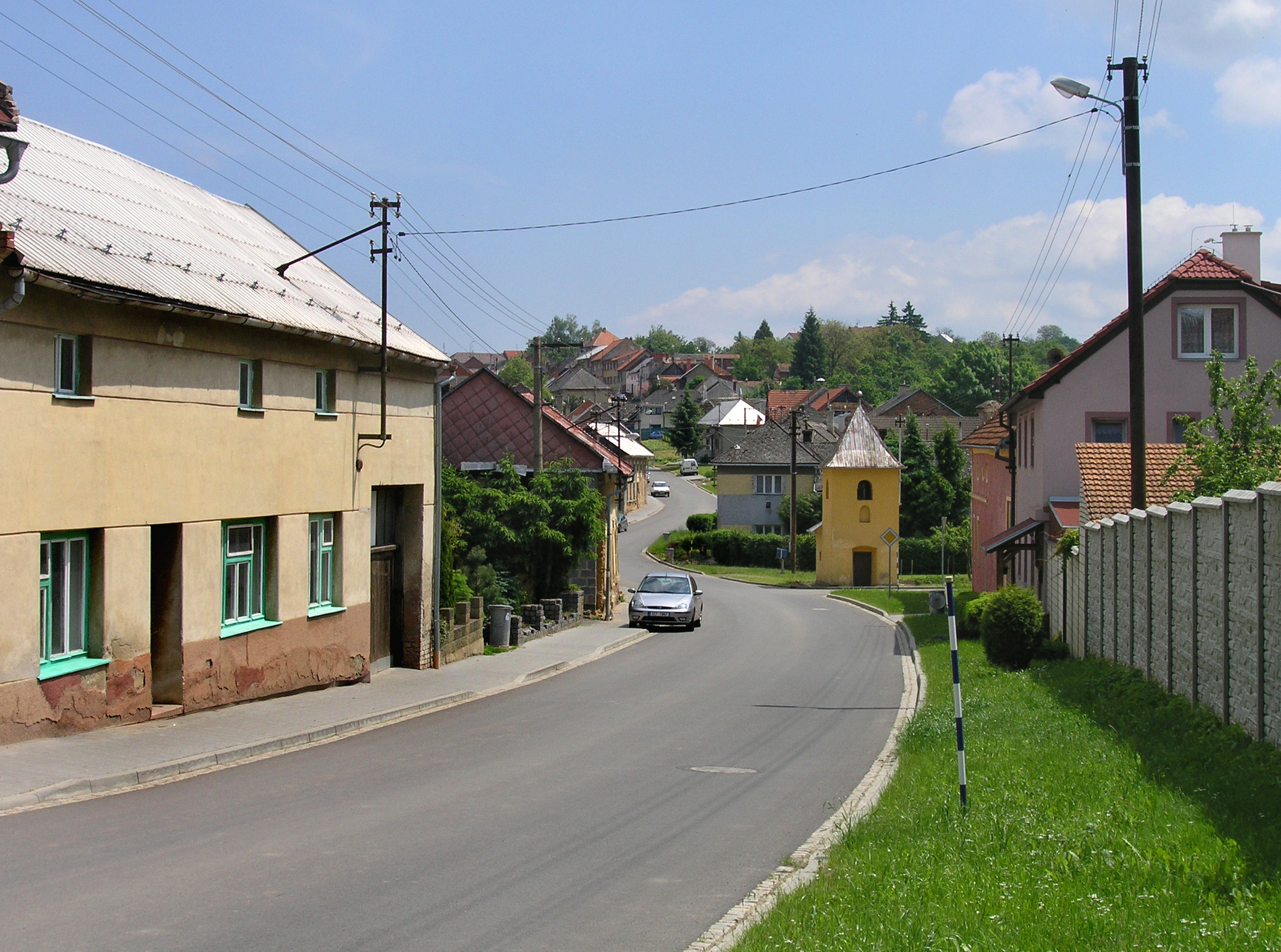
Slížany

There are no railways or major roads passing through the municipality.

== Sights ==
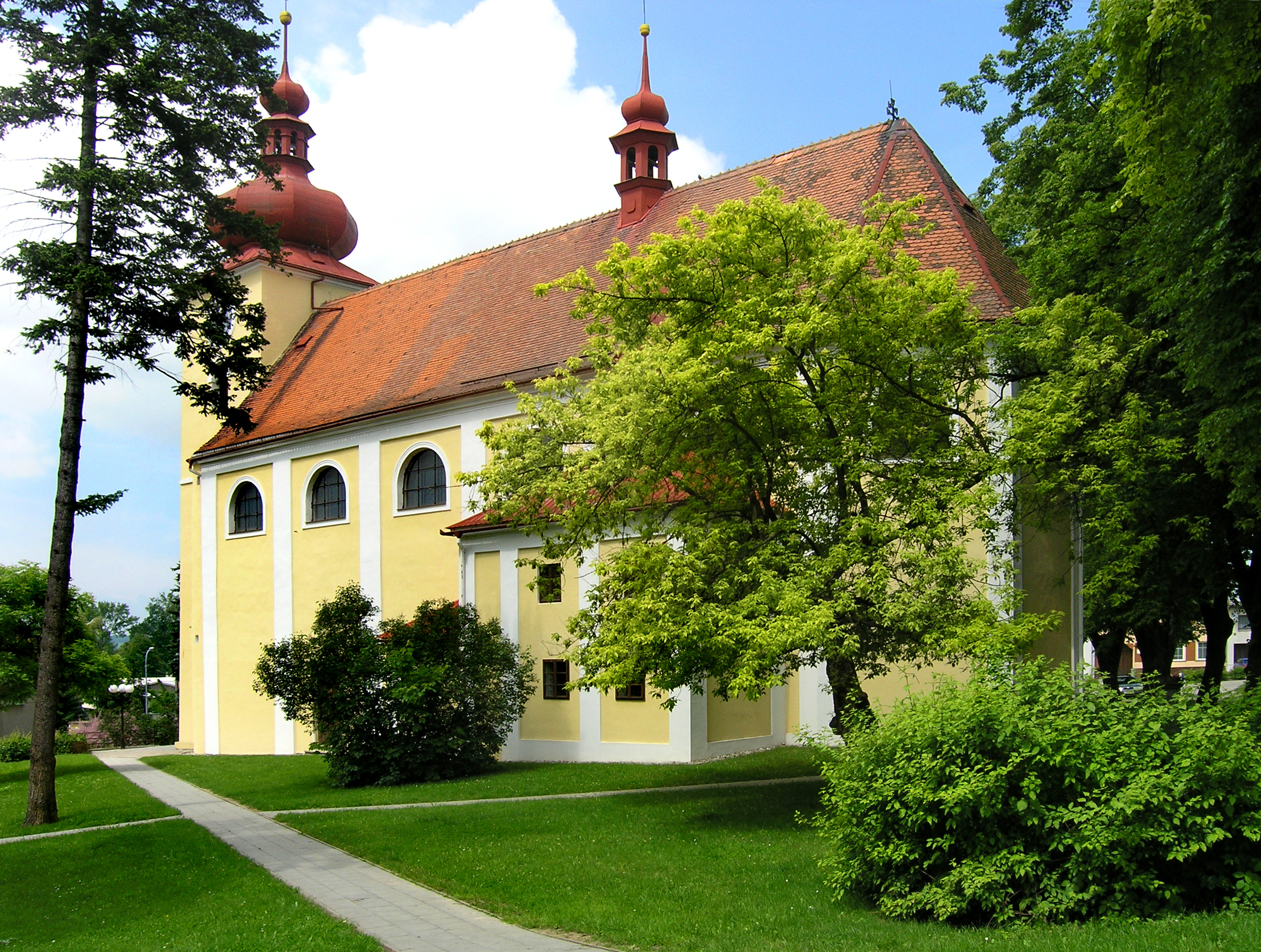
Church of Saint John the Baptist

The Morkovice Castle was built on the side of an old fortress in the 17th century. The castle complex also includes a park and a pair of Baroque statues of Saints Florian and Wendelin.

The Church of Saint John the Baptist has a medieval core, but its current appearance is a result of the reconstruction in the first half of the 18th century.

== Twin towns – sister cities ==
Morkovice-Slížany is twinned with:

- Žitavany, Slovakia
