= 2023 Rosenborg BK season =

Rosenborg
2023 season
- Chairman: Cecilie Gotaas Johnsen
- Coach: Svein Maalen (Interim)
- Stadium: Lerkendal Stadion
- Eliteserien: 9th
- 2022 Norwegian Football Cup: Fourth round
- 2023 Norwegian Football Cup: Second round
- 2023–24 UEFA Europa Conference League: Third round vs Heart of Midlothian
- Top goalscorer: League: Ole Sæter (8); All: Ole Sæter (9)
- Highest home attendance: 21 266 vs Bodø/Glimt (17 August)
- Lowest home attendance: 10 705 vs HamKam (4 June)
- Average home league attendance: 14 098 (26 November)
Home colours	Away colours	Third colours

The 2023 season was Rosenborg's 44th consecutive year in the top flight now known as Eliteserien, their 55th season in the top flight of Norwegian football. They participated in Eliteserien, 2022 and 2023 editions of the Norwegian Football Cup and the Europa Conference League entering at the second qualifying round. This was Kjetil Rekdal's second season as Rosenborg manager, but on 16 June he was sacked. Svein Maalen took over as interim manager with Trond Henriksen as assistant.

== Squad ==
Note: Flags indicate national team as defined under FIFA eligibility rules; some limited exceptions apply. Players may hold more than one non-FIFA nationality.

No.	Pos.	Nation	Player
1	GK	(Norway) NOR	André Hansen
2	DF	(Norway) NOR	Erlend Dahl Reitan
3	DF	(Sweden) SWE	Jonathan Augustinsson
5	MF	(Norway) NOR	Per Ciljan Skjelbred
6	MF	(Finland) FIN	Santeri Väänänen
7	MF	(Norway) NOR	Markus Henriksen (captain)
8	MF	(Norway) NOR	Tobias Børkeeiet
9	FW	(Norway) NOR	Ole Sæter
10	MF	(Norway) NOR	Ole Selnæs
11	FW	(Canada) CAN	Jayden Nelson
14	FW	(Denmark) DEN	Emil Frederiksen
16	DF	(Norway) NOR	Håkon Røsten

No.	Pos.	Nation	Player
17	FW	(Iceland) ISL	Ísak Þorvaldsson
19	DF	(Norway) NOR	Adrian Pereira
20	MF	(Norway) NOR	Edvard Tagseth
21	MF	(Norway) NOR	Olaus Skarsem
23	DF	(Norway) NOR	Ulrik Yttergård Jenssen
24	GK	(Norway) NOR	Sander Tangvik
25	DF	(Sweden) SWE	Adam Andersson
27	FW	(Norway) NOR	Noah Holm
32	DF	(Norway) NOR	Leo Cornic
38	DF	(Norway) NOR	Mikkel Ceïde
41	MF	(Norway) NOR	Sverre Nypan
44	FW	(Norway) NOR	Magnus Holte

== Transfers ==
=== Winter ===
In: Note: Flags indicate national team as defined under FIFA eligibility rules; some limited exceptions apply. Players may hold more than one non-FIFA nationality.

No.	Pos.	Nation	Player
6	MF	(Finland) FIN	Santeri Väänänen (from (Finland) HJK Helsinki)
11	FW	(Canada) CAN	Jayden Nelson (from (Canada) Toronto FC)
17	FW	(Iceland) ISL	Ísak Þorvaldsson (from (Iceland) Breiðablik)
18	MF	(Norway) NOR	Morten Bjørlo (from (Norway) HamKam)
22	FW	(Finland) FIN	Agon Sadiku (from (Finland) Honka)
23	DF	(Norway) NOR	Ulrik Yttergård Jenssen (from (Denmark) FC Nordsjælland)
29	FW	(Norway) NOR	Oscar Aga (from (Sweden) Elfsborg)

Out: Note: Flags indicate national team as defined under FIFA eligibility rules; some limited exceptions apply. Players may hold more than one non-FIFA nationality.

No.	Pos.	Nation	Player
4	MF	(Norway) NOR	Vebjørn Hoff (to (Norway) Lillestrøm)
11	MF	(Denmark) DEN	Victor Jensen (loan return to (Netherlands) Ajax)
14	FW	(Sweden) SWE	Rasmus Wiedesheim-Paul (on loan to (Norway) HamKam)
17	FW	(Denmark) DEN	Casper Tengstedt (to (Portugal) Benfica)
18	DF	(Argentina) ARG	Renzo Giampaoli (loan return to (Argentina) Boca Juniors)
22	FW	(Sweden) SWE	Stefano Vecchia (to (Sweden) Malmö FF)
38	FW	(Norway) NOR	Mikkel Ceïde (on loan to (Norway) Kristiansund, previously on loan at (Norway) Tromsø)
39	MF	(Norway) NOR	Marius Sivertsen Broholm (on loan to (Norway) Kristiansund)
40	FW	(Norway) NOR	Pawel Chrupalla (on loan to (Poland) Wisła Płock, previously on loan at (Norway) Kristiansund)

=== Summer ===
In: Note: Flags indicate national team as defined under FIFA eligibility rules; some limited exceptions apply. Players may hold more than one non-FIFA nationality.

No.	Pos.	Nation	Player
10	MF	(Norway) NOR	Ole Selnæs (free agent, previously at (Switzerland) Zürich)
14	FW	(Denmark) DEN	Emil Frederiksen (from (Denmark) SønderjyskE)
25	DF	(Sweden) SWE	Adam Andersson (loan return from (Denmark) Randers)
27	FW	(Norway) NOR	Noah Holm (loan return from (France) Reims)
28	FW	(Sweden) SWE	Rasmus Wiedesheim-Paul (loan return from (Norway) HamKam)
38	FW	(Norway) NOR	Mikkel Ceïde (loan return from (Norway) Kristiansund)

Out: Note: Flags indicate national team as defined under FIFA eligibility rules; some limited exceptions apply. Players may hold more than one non-FIFA nationality.

No.	Pos.	Nation	Player
10	FW	(Denmark) DEN	Carlo Holse (to (Turkey) Samsunspor)
15	DF	(United States) USA	Sam Rogers (to (Norway) Lillestrøm)
18	MF	(Norway) NOR	Morten Bjørlo (on loan to (Norway) HamKam)
22	FW	(Finland) FIN	Agon Sadiku (on loan to (Norway) Start)
29	FW	(Norway) NOR	Oscar Aga (on loan to (Norway) FFK)
80	FW	(Iceland) ISL	Kristall Máni Ingason (to (Denmark) SønderjyskE)

== Friendlies ==
27 January 2023	Rosenborg	1–1	Tromsø	Trondheim
13:00 CET (UTC+1)	Sæter 90+2' (pen.)	Summary	Erlien 15'	Stadium: Koteng Arena

5 February 2023	Levanger	0–2	Rosenborg	Kyrksæterøra
15:30 CET (UTC+1)		Summary	Røsten 88'; Ingason 90+2'	Stadium: Sodvinhallen

15 February 2023	Stabæk	1–1	Rosenborg	La Línea, Spain
16:00 CET (UTC+1)	Bakenga 17'	Summary	Cornic 74'

19 February 2023	Sandefjord	0–1	Rosenborg	Marbella, Spain
16:00 CET (UTC+1)		Summary	Wiedesheim-Paul 64'

25 February 2023	Rosenborg	3–2	Kristiansund	Trondheim
15:00 CET (UTC+1)	Bjørlo 30'; Børkeeiet 90+1'; Väänänen 90+5'	Summary	Willumsson 1', 12'	Stadium: Koteng Arena

3 March 2023	Rosenborg	1–1	Aalesund	Trondheim
15:00 CET (UTC+1)	Vecchia 64'	Summary	Moe 86'	Stadium: Koteng Arena

18 March 2023	Rosenborg	1–1	Ranheim	Trondheim
14:30 CET (UTC+1)	Dahl Reitan 31'	Summary	Bye 14' (pen.)	Stadium: Koteng Arena

26 March 2023	Rosenborg	0–0	Haugesund	Trondheim
17:00 CET (UTC+1)		Summary		Stadium: Lerkendal Stadion

1 April 2023	Rosenborg	2–1	Kongsvinger	Stjørdalshalsen
13:00 CEST (UTC+2)	Ingason 27' (pen.) 42'	Summary	Moberg 24'	Stadium: MUS Stadion Sandskogan

== Competitions ==
=== Eliteserien ===
==== Results summary ====
Overall								Home						Away					
Pld	W	D	L	GF	GA	GD	Pts	W	D	L	GF	GA	GD	W	D	L	GF	GA	GD
30	11	6	13	46	50	−4	39	7	3	5	24	20	+4	4	3	8	22	30	−8

Last updated: 3 December 2023.
Source: see below

==== Results by round ====
Round	1	2	3	4	5	6	7	8	9	10	11	12	13	14	15	16	17	18	19	20	21	22	23	24	25	26	27	28	29	30
Ground	H	A	H	A	H	A	H	A	H	A	H	A	H	H	A	H	A	H	A	H	A	H	A	A	H	A	H	A	H	A
Result	W	D	D	D	L	L	W	L	W	D	L	L	L	W	W	W	W	L	L	W	L	D	L	L	D	W	W	L	L	W
Position	5	3	6	8	10	12	10	11	9	9	12	13	13	10	10	9	8	8	9	8	10	8	9	9	10	10	9	9	9	9

Updated to match(es) played on 3 December 2023. Source: see below
A = Away; H = Home; W = Win; D = Draw; L = Loss

==== Results ====
10 April 2023 1	Rosenborg	1–0	Viking	Trondheim
14:30 CEST (UTC+2)	Þorvaldsson (yellow card) 45+3'; Ingason (yellow card) 45+4'; Pereira 58'; Dahl Reitan (yellow card) 66'; Henriksen (yellow card) 80'	Summary	Pattynama (yellow card) 45+5' (yellow-red card) 77'; Tripić (yellow card) 66'; Diop (yellow card) 80'; Solbakken (yellow card) 89'	Stadium: Lerkendal Stadion; Attendance: 15,104; Referee: Espen Eskås

16 April 2023 2	Molde	1–1	Rosenborg	Molde
17:00 CEST (UTC+2)	Hansen 18'; Haugan (yellow card) 41'; Kaasa (yellow card) 81'; Mannsverk (yellow card) 88'	Summary	Haugen 34' (o.g.); Pereira (yellow card) 85'; Dahl Reitan (yellow card) 89'; Cornic (yellow card) 90+2'	Stadium: Aker Stadion; Attendance: 10,750; Referee: Tore Hansen

23 April 2023 3	Rosenborg	1–1	Sandefjord	Trondheim
17:00 CEST (UTC+2)	Henriksen (yellow card) 23'; Tagseth (yellow card) 80'; Holse 90+4'	Summary	Loftesnes-Bjune (yellow card) 18'; Walle Egeli (yellow card) 19'; Ayer (yellow card) 31'; Bikoro 31'; Ottosson (yellow card) 44'; Smeulers (yellow card) 76'	Stadium: Lerkendal Stadion; Attendance: 11,256; Referee: Kristoffer Hagenes

30 April 2023 4	Odd	0–0	Rosenborg	Skien
19:15 CEST (UTC+2)	Ingebrigtsen (yellow card) 44'; Wallem (yellow card) 49'	Summary	Väänanen (yellow card) 28'; Henriksen (yellow card) 90+3'	Stadium: Skagerak Arena; Attendance: 8,331; Referee: Daniel Higraff

3 May 2023 18	Rosenborg	0–2	Brann	Trondheim
18:00 CEST (UTC+2)	Pereira (yellow card) 4'; Rogers (yellow card) 7'; Dahl Reitan (yellow card) 22'; Ingason (yellow card) 33'; Cornic (yellow card) 53'	Summary	Heltne Nilsen 23' (yellow card) 77'; Finne 78'	Stadium: Lerkendal Stadion; Attendance: 13,021; Referee: Espen Eskås

6 May 2023 5	Rosenborg	1–3	Vålerenga	Trondheim
18:00 CEST (UTC+2)	Bjørlo 48' (yellow card) 49'; Þorvaldsson (yellow card) 88'	Summary	Ofkir 44' (yellow card) 85'; Jatta 50'; Bjørdal 68' (pen.); Oldrup Jensen (yellow card) 78'	Stadium: Lerkendal Stadion; Attendance: 14,654; Referee: Svein Oddvar Moen

13 May 2023 6	Bodø/Glimt	3–2	Rosenborg	Bodø
17:00 CEST (UTC+2)	Moumbagna 7'; Vetlesen 45+2'; Mvuka 60'; Lode (yellow card) 78' (yellow-red card) 84'; Pellegrino (yellow card) 79'; Grønbæk (yellow card) 88'	Summary	Nypan 11'; Rogers (yellow card) 28'; Ingason 58'; Børkeeiet (yellow card) 66'; Skjelbred (red card) 76'; Tagseth (yellow card) 90+1'	Stadium: Aspmyra Stadion; Attendance: 8,243; Referee: Kristoffer Hagenes

16 May 2023 7	Rosenborg	1–0	Haugesund	Trondheim
18:00 CEST (UTC+2)	Bjørlo 57'; Tagseth (yellow card) 58'	Summary	Christensen (yellow card) 28' (yellow-red card) 34'; Pajaziti (yellow card) 35'	Stadium: Lerkendal Stadion; Attendance: 21,264; Referee: Rohit Saggi

29 May 2023 8	Brann	3–1	Rosenborg	Bergen
17:00 CEST (UTC+2)	Finne 12', 88'; Blomberg 51' (yellow card) 60'; Pallesen Knudsen (yellow card) 84'	Summary	Henriksen 71' (pen.); Skarsem (yellow card) 83'	Stadium: Brann Stadion; Attendance: 16,832; Referee: Sigurd Smehus Kringstad

4 June 2023 9	Rosenborg	4–0	HamKam	Trondheim
17:00 CEST (UTC+2)	Skarsem 18', 71'; Aga 52'; Nelson 56' (yellow card) 77'	Summary		Stadium: Lerkendal Stadion; Attendance: 10,705; Referee: Espen Eskås

11 June 2023 10	Stabæk	2–2	Rosenborg	Bærum
17:00 CEST (UTC+2)	Kostadinov 8'; Bakenga 10'; Edwards (yellow card) 40'; Lucca (yellow card) 76'	Summary	Nelson 29'; Holse 89'; Yttergård Jenssen (yellow card) 90+6'	Stadium: Nadderud Stadion; Attendance: 4,938; Referee: Svein Oddvar Moen

25 June 2023 11	Rosenborg	0–3	Sarpsborg 08	Trondheim
17:00 CEST (UTC+2)	Skjelbred (yellow card) 6'; Yttergård Jenssen (yellow card) 45+2'	Summary	Wichne 24' (yellow card) 6'; Maigaard 22'; Opseth 45+3'	Stadium: Lerkendal Stadion; Attendance: 14,191; Referee: Marius Hansen Grøtta

2 July 2023 12	Aalesund	1–0	Rosenborg	Ålesund
17:00 CEST (UTC+2)	Karlsbakk 47'; Diop (yellow card) 80'; Munksgaard (yellow card) 88'	Summary	Rogers (yellow card) 71'	Stadium: Color Line Stadion; Attendance: 6,209; Referee: Marius Lien

9 July 2023 13	Rosenborg	1–2	Lillestrøm	Trondheim
17:00 CEST (UTC+2)	Sæter 11'; Yttergård Jenssen (yellow card) 82'; Tagseth (yellow card) 90+3'	Summary	Garnås (yellow card) 46'; Adams 85' 90+2' (pen.); Edh (yellow card) 90+4'; Svendsen (yellow card) 90+6'	Stadium: Lerkendal Stadion; Attendance: 12,064; Referee: Sivert Amland

16 July 2023 14	Rosenborg	2–1	Tromsø	Trondheim
17:00 CEST (UTC+2)	Pereira (yellow card) 29'; Sæter 41'; Cornic (yellow card) 55'; Yttergård Jenssen 90+1'	Summary	Diouf 69' (yellow card) 71' (yellow-red card) 84'; Traoré (yellow card) 85'	Stadium: Lerkendal Stadion; Attendance: 12,513; Referee: Mohammad Usman Aslam

23 July 2023 15	Strømsgodset	0–1	Rosenborg	Drammen
19:15 CEST (UTC+2)	Kristensen Dahl (yellow card) 34'; Braut Brunes (yellow card) 41'	Summary	Nelson (yellow card) 15'; Nypan 22'; Väänänen (yellow card) 54'	Stadium: Marienlyst Stadion; Attendance: 7,014; Referee: Kristoffer Hagenes

30 July 2023 16	Rosenborg	3–2	Odd	Trondheim
17:00 CEST (UTC+2)	Sæter 47' 63' (pen.); Väänänen (yellow card) 49'; Tagseth (yellow card) 66'; Yttergård Jenssen 71'	Summary	Midtskogen (yellow card) 15'; Ingebrigtsen 22'; Owusu (red card) 66'	Stadium: Lerkendal Stadion; Attendance: 12,601; Referee: Christian Moen

6 August 2023 17	Haugesund	1–2	Rosenborg	Haugesund
17:00 CEST (UTC+2)	Diarra 3'; Leite (yellow card) 64' (yellow-red card) 70'; Fredriksen (yellow card) 78'	Summary	Børkeeiet (yellow card) 45+3'; Røsten 66'; Þorvaldsson (yellow card) 79'; Holte 89'	Stadium: Haugesund Stadion; Attendance: 4,556; Referee: Sigurd Kringstad

20 August 2023 19	HamKam	3–0	Rosenborg	Hamar
17:00 CEST (UTC+2)	Yttergård Jenssen 15' (o.g.); Onsrud 43'; Kongsro 82'	Summary	Þorvaldsson (yellow card) 59'	Stadium: Briskeby Stadion; Attendance: 6,500; Referee: Steinar Hauge

27 August 2023 20	Rosenborg	4–0	Aalesund	Trondheim
17:00 CEST (UTC+2)	Wiedesheim-Paul 13'; Holse 23'; Nypan 67'; Cornic 90'	Summary		Stadium: Lerkendal Stadion; Attendance: 11,020; Referee: Marius Lien

3 September 2023 21	Tromsø	3–1	Rosenborg	Tromsø
17:00 CEST (UTC+2)	Romsaas 15'; Antonsen 49'; Erlien 85'	Summary	Þorvaldsson 66'	Stadium: Alfheim Stadion; Attendance: 6,216; Referee: Christian Moen

17 September 2023 22	Rosenborg	1–1	Bodø/Glimt	Trondheim
17:00 CEST (UTC+2)	Sæter 45' (pen.) (yellow card) 21'; Nypan (yellow card) 24'; Pereira (yellow card) 84'	Summary	Gulliksen 7' (yellow card) 66'; Saltnes (yellow card) 53'; Wembangomo (yellow card) 56'	Stadium: Lerkendal Stadion; Attendance: 21,266; Referee: Rohit Saggi

24 September 2023 23	Lillestrøm	3–0	Rosenborg	Lillestrøm
17:00 CEST (UTC+2)	Tønnessen 66'; Lehne Olsen 58' (pen.) 65' (yellow card) 45+3'	Summary	Þorvaldsson (yellow card) 22'; Selnæs (yellow card) 26'; Jayden Nelson (yellow card) 54' (yellow-red card) 56'	Stadium: Åråsen Stadion; Attendance: 9,301; Referee: Ola Hobber Nilsen

8 October 2023 24	Sarpsborg 08	5–2	Rosenborg	Sarpsborg
17:00 CEST (UTC+2)	Andersen (yellow card) 14'; Lundqvist 41' 77' (pen.); Berget 57', 80', 88'; Zekhnini (yellow card) 90+2'	Summary	Frederiksen 50' (yellow card) 90+1'; Sæter 62' (pen.)	Stadium: Sarpsborg Stadion; Attendance: 8,022; Referee: Espen Eskås

22 October 2023 25	Rosenborg	1–1	Stabæk	Trondheim
17:00 CEST (UTC+2)	Sæter 33' (yellow card) 43'; Selnæs (yellow card) 45'; Cornic (yellow card) 74'	Summary	Bakenga 13'; Kabran (yellow card) 17' (yellow-red card) 90+3'; Næss (penalty missed) 45'	Stadium: Lerkendal Stadion; Attendance: 13,127; Referee: Sigurd Kringstad

29 October 2023 26	Vålerenga	1–3	Rosenborg	Oslo
17:00 CET (UTC+1)	Ilić 31'; Bitri (yellow card) 42'; Hagen (yellow card) 68'	Summary	Þorvaldsson 12'; Nelson 14' (yellow card) 15'; Sæter 75'; Tangvik (yellow card) 84'	Stadium: Intility Arena; Attendance: 10,892; Referee: Tore Hansen

5 November 2023 27	Rosenborg	3–1	Molde	Trondheim
17:00 CET (UTC+1)	Þorvaldsson 19' (yellow card) 84'; Røsten (yellow card) 28'; Pereira (yellow card) 41'; Sæter (red card) (on the bench); Nypan 80'; Frederiksen 90+5'	Summary	Breivik 24' (yellow card) 71'; Gulbrandsen (yellow card) 35'; Haugan (yellow card) 41'; Fjørtoft Løvik (yellow card) 46' (yellow-red card) 46'	Stadium: Lerkendal Stadion; Attendance: 16,723; Referee: Rohit Saggi

12 November 2023 28	Sandefjord	3–2	Rosenborg	Sandefjord
17:00 CET (UTC+1)	Damnjanovic Nilsson (yellow card) 2'; Walle Egeli 5'; Dunsby 36'; Ruud Tveter 45+4' (pen.); Keto (yellow card) 82'	Summary	Selnæs (yellow card) 17'; Wiedesheim-Paul 49'; Røsten 72'	Stadium: Release Arena; Attendance: 4,063; Referee: Kai Erik Steen

26 November 2023 29	Rosenborg	1–3	Strømsgodset	Trondheim
17:00 CET (UTC+1)	Nelson 28' (pen.); Yttergård Jenssen (yellow card) 80'	Summary	Mehnert 23'; Kristensen Dahl (yellow card) 27'; Valsvik 72'; Tómasson 90+4'	Stadium: Lerkendal Stadion; Attendance: 11,404; Referee: Marius Lien

2 December 2023 30	Viking	1–5	Rosenborg	Stavanger
17:00 CET (UTC+1)	Adegbenro (yellow card) 45+2'; Tripić 71' (pen.) (yellow card) 90+3'; Bell (yellow card) 80'; Langås (yellow card) 90'; Pattynama (yellow card) 90+6'	Summary	Cornic (yellow card) 2'; Þorvaldsson 26', 59'; Väänänen (yellow card) 45+2'; Pereira 47'; Tangvik (yellow card) 57' (yellow-red card); Wiedesheim-Paul 90+7'; Nypan 90+10'	Stadium: Viking Stadion; Attendance: 14,950; Referee: Kai Erik Steen

==== Table ====
Pos	Team	Pld	W	D	L	GF	GA	GD	Pts
7	Strømsgodset	30	13	3	14	37	35	+2	42
8	Sarpsborg	30	12	5	13	55	52	+3	41
9	Rosenborg	30	11	6	13	46	50	−4	39
10	Odd	30	10	8	12	42	44	−2	38
11	HamKam	30	10	4	16	39	59	−20	34

Source: Football Association of Norway (in Norwegian)
Rules for classification: 1) Points; 2) Goal difference; 3) Goals scored; 4) Head-to-head points; 5) Head-to-head goal difference; 6) Head-to-head goals scored.

=== Norwegian Cup 2022 ===
19 May 2022 First Round	Verdal	0–6	Rosenborg	Verdal
18:00 CEST (UTC+2)	Elias McKellar (yellow card) 56'	Summary	Sæter 3'; Pereira 36'; Hoff 42'; Broholm 46', 68'; Holse 48' (penalty missed) 57'	Stadium: Verdal Stadion; Attendance: ≈ 1000; Referee: Eskil Svedberg

22 June 2022 Second Round	Levanger	1–2 (a.e.t.)	Rosenborg	Levanger
18:00 CEST (UTC+2)	Hagbø 18'; Ulstad (yellow card) 30'	Summary	Dahl Reitan (yellow card) 7'; Giampaoli (yellow card) 42'; Sæter 77'; Fiabema 108'	Stadium: Moan Fritidspark; Attendance: 2,500; Referee: Mathias Støfringshaug

30 June 2022 Third Round	Sandnes Ulf	0–2	Rosenborg	Sandnes
18:00 CEST (UTC+2)	Ringberg (yellow card) 68'; Heggem (yellow card) 83'; Sæthre (yellow card) 90'	Summary	Holse 26'; Halgunset 59' (o.g.); Dahl Reitan (yellow card) 73'	Stadium: Øster Hus Arena; Attendance: 2,427; Referee: Kristoffer Hagenes

12 March 2023 Fourth Round	Viking	2–0	Rosenborg	Stavanger
20:15 CEST (UTC+2)	Svendsen 64'; Salvesen 66'	Summary	Cornic (yellow card) 10'; Henriksen (yellow card) 27'	Stadium: Viking Stadion; Attendance: 5,411; Referee: Rohit Saggi

=== Norwegian Cup 2023 ===
24 May 2023 First Round	Trygg/Lade	0–1	Rosenborg	Trondheim
18:00 CEST (UTC+2)	Moen Rygh (yellow card) 39'; Skaftun Boge (yellow card) 42'; Flotve (yellow card) 66'; Hoel Kjørstad (yellow card) 68'	Summary	Sadiku 17'; Nelson (yellow card) 42'; Børkeeiet (yellow card) 61'	Stadium: Koteng Arena; Attendance: 863; Referee: Mathias Støfringshaug

1 June 2023 Second Round	Stjørdals-Blink	2–1	Rosenborg	Stjørdalshalsen
18:00 CEST (UTC+2)	Stølan (yellow card) 52'; Fossli 59'; Hermanstad 70'	Summary	Børkeeiet (yellow card) 39'; Nypan (yellow card) 59'; Aga 89' (pen.)	Stadium: M.U.S Stadion Sandskogan; Attendance: 1,321; Referee: Mathias Kringstad

=== UEFA Europa Conference League ===
==== Second qualifying round ====
27 July 2023 First leg	Crusaders (Northern Ireland)	2–2	(Norway) Rosenborg	Belfast, Northern Ireland
21:00 CEST (UTC+2)	Lowry 11'; Dahl Reitan 74' (o.g.); Burns (yellow card) 89'; Anderson (yellow card) 90+3'	Summary	Holse 30'; Sæter 42' (pen.); Väänänen (yellow card) 85'	Stadium: Seaview; Attendance: 2,278; Referee: Aristotelis Diamantopoulos (Greece)

3 August 2023 Second leg	Rosenborg (Norway)	3–2 (a.e.t.) (5–4 agg.)	(Northern Ireland) Crusaders	Trondheim
19:00 CEST (UTC+2)	Nelson 34'; Pereira (yellow card) 56'; Þorvaldsson 103'; Cornic 108'; Dahl Reitan (yellow card) 120+3'	Summary	Lowry 45' (yellow card) 60'; Lecky (yellow card) 56'; Tuffey (yellow card) 65'; Heatley 105' (yellow card) 73' (yellow-red card) 105+2'; Burns (yellow card) 79'; Owens (yellow card) 116'; O'Rourke (yellow card) 120'; Teelan (yellow card) 120+2'	Stadium: Lerkendal Stadion; Attendance: 11,288; Referee: Ádám Farkas, (Hungary)

==== Third qualifying round ====
10 August 2023 First leg	Rosenborg (Norway)	2–1	(Scotland) Heart of Midlothian	Trondheim
19:00 CEST (UTC+2)	Frederiksen 15'; Nelson 45+1'	Summary	Devlin (yellow card) 14'; Shankland 79' (yellow card) 54'	Stadium: Lerkendal Stadion; Attendance: 11,882; Referee: Andrei Chivulete (Romania)

17 August 2023 Second leg	Heart of Midlothian (Scotland)	3–1 (4–3 agg.)	(Norway) Rosenborg	Edinburgh, Scotland
20:45 CEST (UTC+2)	Shankland 79'; Denholm (yellow card) 32'; Cochrane (yellow card) 34'; Devlin 50' (90+2)	Summary	Þorvaldsson 5' (yellow card) 81'; Pereira (yellow card) 16'	Stadium: Tynecastle Park; Referee: David Fuxman (Israel)

== Squad statistics ==
=== Appearances and goals ===
As of match played 3 December 2023

No.	Pos	Nat	Player	Total		Eliteserien		Norwegian Cup 2022		Norwegian Cup 2023		Europa Conference League	
No.	Pos	Nat	Player	Apps	Goals	Apps	Goals	Apps	Goals	Apps	Goals	Apps	Goals
1	GK	(Norway) NOR	André Hansen	27	0	21+2	0	0+0	0	0+0	0	4+0	0
2	DF	(Norway) NOR	Erlend Dahl Reitan	25	0	20+0	0	0+0	0	1+0	0	4+0	0
3	DF	(Sweden) SWE	Jonathan Augustinsson	0	0	0+0	0	0+0	0	0+0	0	0+0	0
5	MF	(Norway) NOR	Per Ciljan Skjelbred	21	0	5+12	0	1+0	0	0+0	0	0+3	0
6	MF	(Finland) FIN	Santeri Väänänen	27	0	14+9	0	0+1	0	0+0	0	0+3	0
7	MF	(Norway) NOR	Markus Henriksen	16	1	12+1	1	1+0	0	1+1	0	0+0	0
8	MF	(Norway) NOR	Tobias Børkeeiet	26	0	11+8	0	1+0	0	2+0	0	4+0	0
9	FW	(Norway) NOR	Ole Sæter	15	9	9+3	8	0+0	0	1+0	0	2+0	1
10	MF	(Norway) NOR	Ole Selnæs	9	0	9+0	0	0+0	0	0+0	0	0+0	0
11	FW	(Canada) CAN	Jayden Nelson	30	6	18+6	4	0+1	0	2+0	0	3+0	2
14	FW	(Denmark) DEN	Emil Frederiksen	14	3	12+0	2	0+0	0	0+0	0	2+0	1
16	DF	(Norway) NOR	Håkon Røsten	20	2	9+6	2	0+0	0	1+1	0	0+3	0
17	FW	(Iceland) ISL	Ísak Þorvaldsson	21	6	14+4	4	0+0	0	0+0	0	2+1	2
19	DF	(Norway) NOR	Adrian Pereira	33	2	20+6	2	0+1	0	2+0	0	4+0	0
20	MF	(Norway) NOR	Edvard Tagseth	23	0	12+6	0	1+0	0	0+2	0	2+0	0
21	MF	(Norway) NOR	Olaus Skarsem	21	2	16+3	2	0+0	0	1+0	0	1+0	0
23	DF	(Norway) NOR	Ulrik Yttergård Jenssen	34	2	27+0	2	1+0	0	2+0	0	4+0	0
24	GK	(Norway) NOR	Sander Tangvik	12	0	9+0	0	1+0	0	2+0	0	0+0	0
25	DF	(Sweden) SWE	Adam Andersson	13	0	9+2	0	0+0	0	0+0	0	2+0	0
27	FW	(Norway) NOR	Noah Holm	2	0	0+2	0	0+0	0	0+0	0	0+0	0
28	FW	(Sweden) SWE	Rasmus Wiedesheim-Paul	12	3	2+7	3	0+1	0	0+0	0	0+2	0
32	DF	(Norway) NOR	Leo Cornic	29	1	14+10	1	1+0	0	1+0	0	1+2	0
38	DF	(Norway) NOR	Mikkel Ceïde	5	0	1+4	0	0+0	0	0+0	0	0+0	0
41	MF	(Norway) NOR	Sverre Nypan	28	5	17+6	5	0+0	0	1+1	0	3+0	0
42	MF	(Norway) NOR	Oliver Kvendbø Holden	0	0	0+0	0	0+0	0	0+0	0	0+0	0
44	FW	(Norway) NOR	Magnus Holte	5	1	0+3	1	0+0	0	0+0	0	0+2	0
49	DF	(Norway) NOR	Adrian Henrik Kojen	0	0	0+0	0	0+0	0	0+0	0	0+0	0
51	MF	(Norway) NOR	Isak Jønvik Holmen	1	0	0+0	0	0+0	0	1+0	0	0+0	0
Players away from Rosenborg on loan:
18	MF	(Norway) NOR	Morten Bjørlo	18	2	9+5	2	1+0	0	1+1	0	1+0	0
22	FW	(Finland) FIN	Agon Sadiku	10	1	2+6	0	0+0	0	1+0	1	0+1	0
29	FW	(Norway) NOR	Oscar Aga	14	2	3+8	1	1+0	0	1+1	1	0+0	0
39	MF	(Norway) NOR	Marius Sivertsen Broholm	2	0	0+2	0	0+0	0	0+0	0	0+0	0
40	FW	(Norway) NOR	Pawel Chrupalla	0	0	0+0	0	0+0	0	0+0	0	0+0	0
Players who appeared for Rosenborg no longer at the club:
4	MF	(Norway) NOR	Vebjørn Hoff	1	0	0+0	0	0+1	0	0+0	0	0+0	0
10	FW	(Denmark) DEN	Carlo Holse	20	4	16+0	3	0+0	0	0+0	0	4+0	1
15	DF	(United States) USA	Sam Rogers	19	0	13+2	0	1+0	0	0+2	0	1+0	0
80	FW	(Iceland) ISL	Kristall Máni Ingason	11	1	5+3	1	1+0	0	1+1	0	0+0	0

=== Disciplinary record ===
As of match played 3 December 2023

Number	Nation	Position	Name	Eliteserien		Norwegian Cup 2022		Norwegian Cup 2023		Europa Conference League		Total	
Number	Nation	Position	Name	Booked	Sent off (straight red)	Booked	Sent off (straight red)	Booked	Sent off (straight red)	Booked	Sent off (straight red)	Booked	Sent off (straight red)
1	(Norway)	GK	André Hansen	0	0	0	0	0	0	0	0	0	0
2	(Norway)	DF	Erlend Dahl Reitan	3	0	0	0	0	0	1	0	4	0
3	(Sweden)	DF	Jonathan Augustinsson	0	0	0	0	0	0	0	0	0	0
5	(Norway)	MF	Per Ciljan Skjelbred	1	1	0	0	0	0	0	0	1	1
6	(Finland)	MF	Santeri Väänänen	4	0	0	0	0	0	1	0	5	0
7	(Norway)	MF	Markus Henriksen	3	0	1	0	0	0	0	0	4	0
8	(Norway)	MF	Tobias Børkeeiet	2	0	0	0	2	0	0	0	4	0
9	(Norway)	FW	Ole Sæter	2	1	0	0	0	0	0	0	2	1
10	(Norway)	MF	Ole Selnæs	3	0	0	0	0	0	0	0	3	0
11	(Canada)	FW	Jayden Nelson	3	0	0	0	1	0	0	0	4	0
14	(Denmark)	FW	Emil Frederiksen	1	0	0	0	0	0	0	0	1	0
16	(Norway)	DF	Håkon Røsten	1	0	0	0	0	0	0	0	1	0
17	(Iceland)	FW	Ísak Þorvaldsson	6	0	0	0	0	0	1	0	7	0
19	(Norway)	DF	Adrian Pereira	5	0	0	0	0	0	2	0	7	0
20	(Norway)	MF	Edvard Tagseth	5	0	0	0	0	0	0	0	5	0
21	(Norway)	MF	Olaus Skarsem	1	0	0	0	0	0	0	0	1	0
23	(Norway)	DF	Ulrik Yttergård Jenssen	4	0	0	0	0	0	0	0	4	0
24	(Norway)	GK	Sander Tangvik	0	1	0	0	0	0	0	0	0	1
25	(Sweden)	DF	Adam Andersson	0	0	0	0	0	0	0	0	0	0
27	(Norway)	FW	Noah Holm	0	0	0	0	0	0	0	0	0	0
28	(Sweden)	FW	Rasmus Wiedesheim-Paul	0	0	0	0	0	0	0	0	0	0
32	(Norway)	DF	Leo Cornic	5	0	1	0	0	0	0	0	6	0
38	(Norway)	DF	Mikkel Ceïde	0	0	0	0	0	0	0	0	0	0
41	(Norway)	MF	Sverre Nypan	1	0	0	0	1	0	0	0	2	0
42	(Norway)	MF	Oliver Kvendbø Holden	0	0	0	0	0	0	0	0	0	0
44	(Norway)	FW	Magnus Holte	0	0	0	0	0	0	0	0	0	0
49	(Norway)	DF	Adrian Henrik Kojen	0	0	0	0	0	0	0	0	0	0
51	(Norway)	MF	Isak Jønvik Holmen	0	0	0	0	0	0	0	0	0	0
Players away from Rosenborg on loan:
18	(Norway)	MF	Morten Bjørlo	1	0	0	0	0	0	0	0	1	0
22	(Finland)	FW	Agon Sadiku	0	0	0	0	0	0	0	0	0	0
29	(Norway)	FW	Oscar Aga	0	0	0	0	0	0	0	0	0	0
39	(Norway)	MF	Marius Sivertsen Broholm	0	0	0	0	0	0	0	0	0	0
40	(Norway)	FW	Pawel Chrupalla	0	0	0	0	0	0	0	0	0	0
Players who appeared for Rosenborg no longer at the club:
4	(Norway)	MF	Vebjørn Hoff	0	0	0	0	0	0	0	0	0	0
10	(Denmark)	FW	Carlo Holse	0	0	0	0	0	0	0	0	0	0
15	(United States)	DF	Sam Rogers	3	0	0	0	0	0	0	0	3	0
80	(Iceland)	FW	Kristall Máni Ingason	2	0	0	0	0	0	0	0	2	0
			TOTALS	57	4	2	0	4	0	5	0	68	4

== See also ==
- Rosenborg BK seasons
