= 2022 Rosenborg BK season =

Rosenborg
2022 season
- Chairman: Cecilie Gotaas Johnsen
- Coach: Kjetil Rekdal
- Stadium: Lerkendal Stadion
- Eliteserien: 3rd
- Norwegian Cup: Fourth round
- Top goalscorer: League: Tengstedt (15); All: Sæter (16)
- Highest home attendance: 21 275 vs Bodø/Glimt (30 October)
- Lowest home attendance: 9 764 vs Aalesund (21 August)
- Average home league attendance: 13 092 (13 November)
Home colours	Away colours	Third colours

The 2022 season is Rosenborg's 43rd consecutive year in the top flight now known as Eliteserien, their 54th season in the top flight of Norwegian football. They will participate in Eliteserien and the Cup. This will be Kjetil Rekdal's first season as Rosenborg manager.

== Squad ==
Note: Flags indicate national team as defined under FIFA eligibility rules; some limited exceptions apply. Players may hold more than one non-FIFA nationality.

No.	Pos.	Nation	Player
1	GK	(Norway) NOR	André Hansen
2	DF	(Norway) NOR	Erlend Dahl Reitan
3	DF	(Sweden) SWE	Jonathan Augustinsson
5	MF	(Norway) NOR	Per Ciljan Skjelbred
7	MF	(Norway) NOR	Markus Henriksen (captain)
8	MF	(Norway) NOR	Tobias Børkeeiet
10	FW	(Denmark) DEN	Carlo Holse
11	FW	(Denmark) DEN	Victor Jensen (on loan from Ajax)
15	DF	(United States) USA	Sam Rogers
16	DF	(Norway) NOR	Håkon Røsten
17	FW	(Denmark) DEN	Casper Tengstedt

No.	Pos.	Nation	Player
18	DF	(Argentina) ARG	Renzo Giampaoli (on loan from Boca Juniors)
19	DF	(Norway) NOR	Adrian Pereira
20	MF	(Norway) NOR	Edvard Tagseth
21	MF	(Norway) NOR	Olaus Skarsem
22	FW	(Sweden) SWE	Stefano Vecchia
24	GK	(Norway) NOR	Sander Tangvik
27	FW	(Norway) NOR	Ole Sæter
32	DF	(Norway) NOR	Leo Cornic
39	MF	(Norway) NOR	Marius Sivertsen Broholm
41	MF	(Norway) NOR	Sverre Nypan
80	FW	(Iceland) ISL	Kristall Máni Ingason

== Transfers ==
=== Winter ===
In: Note: Flags indicate national team as defined under FIFA eligibility rules; some limited exceptions apply. Players may hold more than one non-FIFA nationality.

No.	Pos.	Nation	Player
8	MF	(Norway) NOR	Tobias Børkeeiet (from (Denmark) Brøndby)
11	FW	(Denmark) DEN	Victor Jensen (on loan from (Netherlands) Ajax)
15	DF	(United States) USA	Sam Rogers (from (Norway) HamKam)
18	DF	(Argentina) ARG	Renzo Giampaoli (on loan from (Argentina) Boca Juniors)
29	FW	(Norway) NOR	Bryan Fiabema (on loan from (England) Chelsea)

Out: Note: Flags indicate national team as defined under FIFA eligibility rules; some limited exceptions apply. Players may hold more than one non-FIFA nationality.

No.	Pos.	Nation	Player
6	MF	(Norway) NOR	Alexander Tettey (Retired)
8	MF	(Norway) NOR	Anders Konradsen (Released, to (Norway) Bodø/Glimt)
9	FW	(Montenegro) MNE	Dino Islamović (to (South Korea) Gangwon FC)
14	FW	(Sweden) SWE	Rasmus Wiedesheim-Paul (on loan to (Sweden) Mjällby)
15	DF	(Iceland) ISL	Hólmar Örn Eyjólfsson (to (Iceland) Valur)
16	DF	(Norway) NOR	Even Hovland (to (Sweden) Häcken)
26	FW	(Norway) NOR	Filip Brattbakk (to (Norway) Raufoss)
26	DF	(Bosnia and Herzegovina) BIH	Besim Šerbečić (Released, to (Norway) Aalesunds FK)
35	FW	(Norway) NOR	Emil Ceïde (on loan to (Italy) Sassuolo)
38	DF	(Norway) NOR	Mikkel Ceïde (on loan to (Sweden) Utsiktens BK)
–	MF	(Norway) NOR	Gjermund Åsen (to (Norway) Lillestrøm, previously on loan)
–	DF	(Norway) NOR	Warren Kamanzi (Released, to Tromsø)

=== Summer ===
In: Note: Flags indicate national team as defined under FIFA eligibility rules; some limited exceptions apply. Players may hold more than one non-FIFA nationality.

No.	Pos.	Nation	Player
17	FW	(Denmark) DEN	Casper Tengstedt (from (Denmark) Horsens)
32	DF	(Norway) NOR	Leo Cornic (from (Sweden) Djurgårdens IF)
38	DF	(Norway) NOR	Mikkel Ceïde (loan return from (Sweden) Utsiktens BK)
80	FW	(Iceland) ISL	Kristall Máni Ingason (from (Iceland) Víkingur Reykjavík)

Out: Note: Flags indicate national team as defined under FIFA eligibility rules; some limited exceptions apply. Players may hold more than one non-FIFA nationality.

No.	Pos.	Nation	Player
4	MF	(Norway) NOR	Vebjørn Hoff (on loan to (Norway) Odd)
9	FW	(Norway) NOR	Noah Holm (on loan to (France) Reims)
13	GK	(Norway) NOR	Julian Faye Lund (to (Norway) Bodø/Glimt)
14	FW	(Sweden) SWE	Rasmus Wiedesheim-Paul (on loan to (Sweden) Helsingborg)
23	MF	(Sweden) SWE	Pavle Vagić (to (Sweden) Hammarby)
25	DF	(Sweden) SWE	Adam Andersson (on loan to (Denmark) Randers)
29	FW	(Norway) NOR	Bryan Fiabema (loan return to (England) Chelsea)
35	FW	(Norway) NOR	Emil Ceïde (to (Italy) Sassuolo)
38	DF	(Norway) NOR	Mikkel Ceïde (on loan to (Norway) Tromsø)
40	FW	(Norway) NOR	Pawel Chrupalla (on loan to (Norway) Kristiansund)

== Friendlies ==
4 February 2022	Djurgården (Sweden)	2–1	(Norway) Rosenborg	Las Palmas, Spain
16:00 CET (UTC+1)	Edvardsen 31'; Ekdal 33'	Summary	Holse 61'	Stadium: Ciudad Deportiva de Barranco Seco

18 February 2022	Rosenborg (Norway)	Cancelled	(Estonia) Flora Tallinn	Trondheim
				Stadium: Lerkendal Park

25 February 2022	Kristiansund (Norway)	3–2	(Norway) Rosenborg	Kristiansund
16:15 CET UTC+1)	Gjertsen 32'; Mawa 34'; Bye 65'	Summary	Giampaoli 20'; Sæter 27'	Stadium: Kristiansund Stadion; Attendance: 500

1 March 2022	Rosenborg (Norway)	7–2	(Norway) Byåsen	Trondheim
12:00 CET (UTC+1))	Vecchia 4'; Børkeeiet 42'; Holm 45'; Henriksen 68'; Broholm 69'; Wiedesheim-Paul 84'; Brattbakk 89'		Ceïde 82' (o.g.) ? 85'	Stadium: Lerkendal Park

4 March 2022	Ranheim (Norway)	3–0	(Norway) Rosenborg	Trondheim
16:00 CET (UTC+1)	Reginiussen 39'; Tønne 57'; Alte 75'			Stadium: EXTRA Arena

11 March 2022	Haugesund (Norway)	0–0	(Norway) Rosenborg	Marbella, Spain
18:30 CET (UTC+1)		Summary

15 March 2022	Kristiansund (Norway)	2–3	(Norway) Rosenborg	Marbella, Spain
17:00 CET (UTC+1)	Mawa 13'; Willumsson 88'	Summary	Holse 20', 84'; Holm 86'

20 March 2022	Tromsø (Norway)	2–1	(Norway) Rosenborg	Tromsø
14:00 CET (UTC+1)	Gundersen 17'; Moses 71'	Summary	Dahl Reitan 24'	Stadium: Alfheim Stadion

25 March 2022	Rosenborg (Norway)	0–3	(Norway) Raufoss	Trondheim
14:00 CET (UTC+1)		Summary	Haltvik 20', 61'; Johnsgård 52'	Stadium: Lerkendal Park

29 April 2022	Rosenborg (Norway)	3–0	(Norway) Stjørdals-Blink	Trondheim
16:00 CET (UTC+1)	Jensen 34'; Sæter 38'; Fiabema 44'	Summary		Stadium: Lerkendal Stadion

13 June 2022	Rosenborg (Norway)	2–0	(Norway) Aalesunds	Trondheim
13:00 CET (UTC+1)	Sæter 7'; Vecchia 57'	Summary		Stadium: Lerkendal Stadion

23 September 2022	Rosenborg (Norway)	2–1	(Norway) Ranheim	Trondheim
11:00 CET (UTC+1)	Broholm 19', 48'	Summary	Tønne 30'	Stadium: Lerkendal Park

== Competitions ==
=== Eliteserien ===
==== Results summary ====
Overall								Home						Away					
Pld	W	D	L	GF	GA	GD	Pts	W	D	L	GF	GA	GD	W	D	L	GF	GA	GD
30	16	8	6	69	44	+25	56	12	2	1	38	15	+23	4	6	5	31	29	+2

Last updated: 13 November 2022.
Source: see below

==== Results by round ====
Round	1	2	3	4	5	6	7	8	9	10	11	12	13	14	15	16	17	18	19	20	21	22	23	24	25	26	27	28	29	30
Ground	A	H	A	H	A	H	A	H	A	A	H	A	H	A	H	A	H	A	H	A	H	A	H	A	H	H	A	H	A	H
Result	D	W	D	D	L	W	D	D	W	L	W	D	W	D	W	W	W	W	W	L	W	L	W	D	W	W	L	W	W	L
Position	7	5	7	9	12	7	8	7	6	9	5	7	4	5	4	4	4	4	4	4	4	4	3	3	3	3	3	3	3	3

Updated to match(es) played on 13 November 2022. Source: see below
A = Away; H = Home; W = Win; D = Draw; L = Loss

==== Results ====
3 April 2022 1	Bodø/Glimt	2–2	Rosenborg	Bodø
20:00 CEST	Pellegrino 63' (pen.); Espejord 70'	Summary	Børkeeiet 15', 75'; Holm (yellow card) 25'; Jensen (yellow card) 44'; Tagseth (yellow card) 55'; Dahl Reitan (yellow card) 62'	Stadium: Aspmyra Stadion; Attendance: 6,465; Referee: Espen Eskås

10 April 2022 2	Rosenborg	1–0	Odd	Trondheim
18:00 CEST	Holm 34'; Holse (yellow card) 73'; Børkeeiet (yellow card) 74'	Summary	Ruud (yellow card) 56'	Stadium: Lerkendal Stadion; Attendance: 12,048; Referee: Ola Hobber Nilsen

18 April 2022 3	Sarpsborg 08	1–1	Rosenborg	Sarpsborg
18:00 CEST	Heintz 45+1'; Skipper (yellow card) 79'; Soltvedt (yellow card) 88'	Summary	Vecchia 64'; Pereira (yellow card) 90+3'	Stadium: Sarpsborg Stadion; Attendance: 5,506; Referee: Svein Oddvar Moen

24 April 2022 4	Rosenborg	0–0	Molde	Trondheim
20:00 CEST	Sæter (yellow card) 73'	Summary	Tiedemann Hansen (yellow card) 25'; Mannsverk (yellow card) 51'; Knudtzon (yellow card) 64'	Stadium: Lerkendal Stadion; Attendance: 14,327; Referee: Espen Andreas Eksås

8 May 2022 5	Strømsgodset	3–0	Rosenborg	Drammen
18:00 CEST	Dahl Reitan 2' (o.g.); Hove 22'; Jack 37'; Stenevik (yellow card) 63'	Summary	Børkeeiet (yellow card) 42'; Rogers (yellow card) 54'; Pereira (yellow card) 63'; Henriksen (yellow card) 73'	Stadium: Marienlyst Stadion; Attendance: 5,324; Referee: Sivert Amland

16 May 2022 6	Rosenborg	3–0	Sandefjord	Trondheim
18:00 CEST	Vecchia 7' 65' (pen.); Tagseth 58'	Summary	Kurtovic (yellow card) 64'	Stadium: Lerkendal Stadion; Attendance: 20,149; Referee: Rohit Saggi

22 May 2022 7	HamKam	1–1	Rosenborg	Hamar
20:00 CEST	Kongsro (yellow card) 57'; Kuruçay (yellow card) 64'; Eriksen 69'	Summary	Rogers 24'	Stadium: Briskeby Arena; Attendance: 6,904; Referee: Kristoffer Hagenes

26 May 2022 8	Rosenborg	3–3	Haugesund	Trondheim
18:00 CEST	Vecchia 35'; Sæter (yellow card) 47'; Pereira 55'; Reese 74' (o.g.)	Summary	Søderlund 10' (pen.) (yellow card) 48'; Sande 20' (yellow card) 81'; Ndour 40'; Walstad (yellow card) 47'; Selvik (yellow card) 61'	Stadium: Lerkendal Stadion; Attendance: 11,076; Referee: Kai Erik Steen

29 May 2022 9	Vålerenga	0–4	Rosenborg	Oslo
20:00 CEST	Bjørdal (yellow card) 25'; Tollås Nation (yellow card) 40'; Strand (yellow card) 71'; Dønnum (yellow card) 72'	Summary	Sæter 8', 49'; Jensen (yellow card) 13'; Vecchia 22'; Pereira 68' (yellow card) 72'; Rogers (yellow card) 72'	Stadium: Intility Arena; Attendance: 10,156; Referee: Tore Hansen

19 June 2022 10	Lillestrøm	3–1	Rosenborg	Lillestrøm
18:00 CEST	Mathew 32' (yellow card) 76'; Dragsnes 38'; Knudsen 87'	Summary	Vecchia 16'; Skarsem (yellow card) 76'; Vagić (yellow card) 90+2'	Stadium: Åråsen Stadion; Attendance: 10,229; Referee: Espen Eskås

25 June 2022 11	Rosenborg	3–1	Kristiansund	Trondheim
18:00 CEST	Sæter 4', 37', 47' (yellow card) 61'; Skarsem (yellow card) 61'	Summary	Diop 19'; Askar (yellow card) 25'; Mbaye (yellow card) 61'; Williamsen (yellow card) 61'; Strand Nilsen (yellow card) 66'	Stadium: Lerkendal Stadion; Attendance: 11,843; Referee: Mohammad Usman Aslam

3 July 2022 12	Viking	1–1	Rosenborg	Stavanger
20:00 CEST	Friðjónsson (yellow card) 45'; Pereira 66' (o.g.); Bjørshol (yellow card) 72'; Tripić (red card) 90+1'	Summary	Vecchia 29'; Pereira (yellow card) 44'; Henriksen (red card) 90+1'	Stadium: SR-Bank Arena; Attendance: 9,221; Referee: Tore Hansen

10 July 2022 13	Rosenborg	3–2	Jerv	Trondheim
18:00 CEST (UTC+2)	Rogers 20', 45+2', 62'; Børkeeiet (yellow card) 70'	Summary	Schröter 16'; Ugland (yellow card) 27'; Wichne (yellow card) 48'; Kolskogen (yellow card) 70'; Furtado 73' (pen.)	Stadium: Lerkendal Stadion; Attendance: 11,050; Referee: Christian Moen

17 July 2022 14	Aalesund	0–0	Rosenborg	Ålesund
20:00 CEST	Barmen (yellow card) 59'; Golubović (yellow card) 85'	Summary		Stadium: Color Line Stadion; Attendance: 6,154; Referee: Svein Tore Sinnes

23 July 2022 15	Rosenborg	3–0	Tromsø	Trondheim
18:00 CEST	Rogers (yellow card) 28'; Jensen 38'; Dahl Reitan 44'; Chrupałła 90+2'	Summary	Nilsen (yellow card) 90+1'	Stadium: Lerkendal Stadion; Attendance: 10,708; Referee: Kristoffer Hagenes

30 July 2022 16	Odd	2–3	Rosenborg	Skien
18:00 CEST	Rønningen Jørgensen 10' (yellow card) 45'; Stensrud 81'; Kitolano (yellow card) 90'	Summary	Holse 56'; Dahl Reitan 66'; Skarsem (yellow card) 68'; Sæter 77'; Giampaoli (yellow card) 90+1'	Stadium: Skagerak Arena; Attendance: 4,292; Referee: Marius Hansen Grøtta

6 August 2022 17	Rosenborg	2–1	HamKam	Trondheim
18:00 CEST	Tengstedt 14'; Sæter 71'	Summary	Onsrud 32'; Kirkevold (yellow card) 40'; Opsahl (red card) 58'	Stadium: Lerkendal Stadion; Attendance: 11,387; Referee: Daniel Higraff

12 August 2022 18	Sandefjord	2–5	Rosenborg	Sandefjord
19:00 CEST	Ofkir 6'; Keto (yellow card) 8'; Ruud Tveter 15'; Smeulers (yellow card) 86'; Taaje (red card) 90'	Summary	Sæter 8' (pen.); Tengstedt 14', 62', 67'; Hansen (yellow card) 72'; Fiabema 90+2'	Stadium: Release Arena; Attendance: 6,182; Referee: Daniel Higraff

21 August 2022 19	Rosenborg	2–1	Aalesund	Trondheim
20:00 CEST	Sæter 40' (pen.); Jensen (yellow card) 48'; Tengstedt 90+1'	Summary	Bolkan Nordli 30'; Šerbečić (yellow card) 48'; Haugen (yellow card) 85'	Stadium: Lerkendal Stadion; Attendance: 9,764; Referee: Svein Oddvar Moen

28 August 2022 20	Tromsø	4–3	Rosenborg	Tromsø
20:00 CEST	Mikkelsen 14', 90+1' (yellow card) 32'; Kamanzi 16' (yellow card) 32'; Yttergård Jenssen 48' (yellow card) 70'; Kitolano (yellow card) 83'	Summary	Ingason 23', 29' (pen.); Rogers 35'; Skarsem (yellow card) 84'	Stadium: Alfheim Stadion; Attendance: 4,108; Referee: Tore Hansen

4 September 2022 21	Rosenborg	4–1	Viking	Trondheim
18:00 CEST	Sæter 2', 50'; Børkeeiet (yellow card) 37'; Tengstedt 38', 47'	Summary	Skyttä (yellow card) 19'; Haugen (yellow card) 79'; Traoré 89'	Stadium: Lerkendal Stadion; Attendance: 10,737; Referee: Ola Hobber Nilsen

11 September 2022 22	Haugesund	2–1	Rosenborg	Haugesund
20:00 CEST	Zafeiris 29'; Christensen 55'; Sande (yellow card) 62'	Summary	Dahl Reitan 19'	Stadium: Haugesund Stadion; Attendance: 4,078; Referee: Espen Eskås

18 September 2022 23	Rosenborg	3–1	Lillestrøm	Trondheim
18:00 CEST	Tengstedt 6' (yellow card) 75'; Giampaoli (yellow card) 8'; Sæter 11', 51'; Børkeeiet (yellow card) 47'; Dahl Reitan (yellow card) 88'	Summary	Lehne Olsen 48'; Friðjónsson (yellow card) 88'	Stadium: Lerkendal Stadion; Attendance: 13,529; Referee: Rohit Saggi

2 October 2022 24	Kristiansund	4–4	Rosenborg	Kristiansund
19:00 CEST	Kartum 24'; Bye 30'; Strand Nilsen 37'; Rogers 90+1' (o.g.)	Summary	Cornic 26'; Tengstedt 62', 72'; Jensen 76'	Stadium: Kristiansund Stadion; Attendance: 4,444; Referee: Daniel Higraff

9 October 2022 25	Rosenborg	3–0	Vålerenga	Trondheim
19:00 CEST	Tengstedt 17'; Jensen 32', 73'	Summary	Juklerød (yellow card) 45'	Stadium: Lerkendal Stadion; Attendance: 13,044; Referee: Svein Oddvar Moen

15 October 2022 26	Rosenborg	3–0	Strømsgodset	Trondheim
18:00 CEST	Sæter 24'; Tengstedt 29' (yellow card) 73'; Jensen (yellow card) 52'; Vecchia 89'	Summary	Friday (yellow card) 52'	Stadium: Lerkendal Stadion; Attendance: 10,283; Referee: Espen Eskås

23 October 2022 27	Molde	2–1	Rosenborg	Molde
19:00 CEST	Breivik (yellow card) 8'; Brynhildsen 9'; Fofana 64'; Karlstrøm (yellow card) 89'	Summary	Henriksen (yellow card) 19'; Cornic (yellow card) 33' (goal) 77'	Stadium: Aker Stadion; Attendance: 10,755; Referee: Tore Hansen

30 October 2022 28	Rosenborg	3–2	Bodø/Glimt	Trondheim
17:00 CET	Holse 73', 88' (yellow card) 78'; Tengstedt 77'	Summary	Espejord 18'; Vetlesen 76'	Stadium: Lerkendal Stadion; Attendance: 21,275; Referee: Kristoffer Hagenes

6 November 2022 29	Jerv	2–4	Rosenborg	Grimstad
17:00 CET	Fernandes (yellow card) 49'; Sandberg (yellow card) 58'; Ugland 75', 86' (yellow card) 90'	Summary	Tengstedt 7', 63'; Jensen 27'; Sæter (yellow card) 40'; Vecchia 56'	Stadium: Levermyr Stadion; Attendance: 3,002; Referee: Tom Harald Hagen

13 November 2022 30	Rosenborg	2–3	Sarpsborg 08	Trondheim
17:00 CET	Rogers (yellow card) 21' (goal) 35'; Cornic (yellow card) 26' (goal) 89'; Børkeeiet (yellow card) 49'	Summary	Heintz 6'; Tibbling (yellow card) 31'; Maigaard 37'; Hagelskjær (yellow card) 62'; Halvorsen (yellow card) 70'; Engvall (yellow card) 71'; Skålevik (yellow card) 78'; Cornic 90+3' (o.g.)	Stadium: Lerkendal Stadion; Attendance: 15,157; Referee: Espen Eskås

==== Table ====
Pos	Team	Pld	W	D	L	GF	GA	GD	Pts	Qualification or relegation
1	Molde (C)	30	25	3	2	71	25	+46	78	Qualification for the Champions League second qualifying round
2	Bodø/Glimt	30	18	6	6	86	41	+45	60	Qualification for the Europa Conference League second qualifying round
3	Rosenborg	30	16	8	6	69	44	+25	56	Qualification for the Europa Conference League second qualifying round
4	Lillestrøm	30	16	5	9	49	34	+15	53	
5	Odd	30	13	6	11	43	45	−2	45	

Source: Football Association of Norway (in Norwegian)
Rules for classification: 1) Points; 2) Goal difference; 3) Goals scored; 4) Head-to-head points; 5) Head-to-head goal difference; 6) Head-to-head goals scored.
(C) Champions

=== Norwegian Cup ===
19 May 2022 First Round	Verdal	0–6	Rosenborg	Verdal
18:00 CEST (UTC+2)	Elias McKellar (yellow card) 56'	Summary	Sæter 3'; Pereira 36'; Hoff 42'; Broholm 46', 68'; Holse 48' (penalty missed) 57'	Stadium: Verdal Stadion; Attendance: ≈ 1000; Referee: Eskil Svedberg

22 June 2022 Second Round	Levanger	1–2 (a.e.t.)	Rosenborg	Levanger
18:00 CEST (UTC+2)	Hagbø 18'; Ulstad (yellow card) 30'	Summary	Dahl Reitan (yellow card) 7'; Giampaoli (yellow card) 42'; Sæter 77'; Fiabema 108'	Stadium: Moan Fritidspark; Attendance: 2,500; Referee: Mathias Støfringshaug

30 June 2022 Third Round	Sandnes Ulf	0–2	Rosenborg	Sandnes
18:00 CEST (UTC+2)	Ringberg (yellow card) 68'; Heggem (yellow card) 83'; Sæthre (yellow card) 90'	Summary	Holse 26'; Halgunset 59' (o.g.); Dahl Reitan (yellow card) 73'	Stadium: Øster Hus Arena; Attendance: 2,427; Referee: Kristoffer Hagenes

12 March 2023 Fourth Round	Viking	2–0	Rosenborg	Stavanger
20:15 CEST (UTC+2)	Svendsen 64'; Salvesen 66'	Summary	Cornic (yellow card) 10'; Henriksen (yellow card) 27'	Stadium: Viking Stadion; Attendance: 5,411; Referee: Rohit Saggi

== Squad statistics ==
=== Appearances and goals ===
As of match played 13 November 2022

No.	Pos	Nat	Player	Total		Eliteserien		Norwegian Cup	
No.	Pos	Nat	Player	Apps	Goals	Apps	Goals	Apps	Goals
1	GK	(Norway) NOR	André Hansen	31	0	30+0	0	1+0	0
2	DF	(Norway) NOR	Erlend Dahl Reitan	33	3	29+1	3	3+0	0
3	DF	(Sweden) SWE	Jonathan Augustinsson	4	0	0+3	0	0+1	0
5	MF	(Norway) NOR	Per Ciljan Skjelbred	20	0	4+15	0	1+0	0
7	MF	(Norway) NOR	Markus Henriksen	31	0	29+0	0	2+0	0
8	MF	(Norway) NOR	Tobias Børkeeiet	28	2	27+0	2	1+0	0
10	FW	(Denmark) DEN	Carlo Holse	31	5	25+3	3	3+0	2
11	FW	(Denmark) DEN	Victor Jensen	30	5	25+3	5	2+0	0
15	DF	(United States) USA	Sam Rogers	25	6	21+2	6	2+0	0
16	DF	(Norway) NOR	Håkon Røsten	5	0	0+3	0	0+2	0
17	FW	(Denmark) DEN	Casper Tengstedt	14	15	14+0	15	0+0	0
18	DF	(Argentina) ARG	Renzo Giampaoli	26	0	10+14	0	1+1	0
19	DF	(Norway) NOR	Adrian Pereira	23	3	11+10	2	2+0	1
20	MF	(Norway) NOR	Edvard Tagseth	29	1	20+7	1	2+0	0
21	MF	(Norway) NOR	Olaus Skarsem	27	0	20+5	0	2+0	0
22	FW	(Sweden) SWE	Stefano Vecchia	17	9	9+7	9	0+1	0
24	GK	(Norway) NOR	Sander Tangvik	1	0	0+1	0	0+0	0
27	FW	(Norway) NOR	Ole Sæter	22	16	18+2	14	2+0	2
32	DF	(Norway) NOR	Leo Cornic	12	3	10+2	3	0+0	0
33	DF	(Norway) NOR	Tobias Solheim Dahl	1	0	0+0	0	1+0	0
34	MF	(Norway) NOR	Dennis Bakke Gaustad	1	0	0+0	0	0+1	0
39	MF	(Norway) NOR	Marius Sivertsen Broholm	11	2	0+9	0	0+2	2
41	MF	(Norway) NOR	Sverre Nypan	2	0	2+0	0	0+0	0
44	FW	(Norway) NOR	Magnus Holte	1	0	0+1	0	0+0	0
80	FW	(Iceland) ISL	Kristall Máni Ingason	7	2	1+6	2	0+0	0
Players away from Rosenborg on loan:
4	MF	(Norway) NOR	Vebjørn Hoff	13	1	0+10	0	2+1	1
9	FW	(Norway) NOR	Noah Holm	11	1	8+3	1	0+0	0
14	FW	(Sweden) SWE	Rasmus Wiedesheim-Paul	0	0	0+0	0	0+0	0
25	DF	(Sweden) SWE	Adam Andersson	6	0	1+4	0	1+0	0
38	DF	(Norway) NOR	Mikkel Ceïde	0	0	0+0	0	0+0	0
40	FW	(Norway) NOR	Pawel Chrupalla	6	1	0+4	1	0+2	0
Players who appeared for Rosenborg no longer at the club:
13	GK	(Norway) NOR	Julian Faye Lund	2	0	0+0	0	2+0	0
23	MF	(Sweden) SWE	Pavle Vagić	13	0	10+1	0	1+1	0
29	FW	(Norway) NOR	Bryan Fiabema	14	2	5+6	1	2+1	1

=== Disciplinary record ===
As of match played 13 November 2022

Number	Nation	Position	Name	Eliteserien		Norwegian Cup		Total	
Number	Nation	Position	Name	Booked	Sent off (straight red)	Booked	Sent off (straight red)	Booked	Sent off (straight red)
1	(Norway)	GK	André Hansen	1	0	0	0	1	0
2	(Norway)	DF	Erlend Dahl Reitan	2	0	2	0	4	0
3	(Sweden)	DF	Jonathan Augustinsson	0	0	0	0	0	0
5	(Norway)	MF	Per Ciljan Skjelbred	0	0	0	0	0	0
7	(Norway)	MF	Markus Henriksen	3	1	0	0	3	1
8	(Norway)	MF	Tobias Børkeeiet	6	0	0	0	6	0
10	(Denmark)	FW	Carlo Holse	2	0	0	0	2	0
11	(Denmark)	FW	Victor Jensen	4	0	0	0	4	0
15	(United States)	DF	Sam Rogers	4	0	0	0	4	0
16	(Norway)	DF	Håkon Røsten	0	0	0	0	0	0
17	(Denmark)	FW	Casper Tengstedt	2	0	0	0	2	0
18	(Argentina)	DF	Renzo Giampaoli	3	0	0	0	3	0
19	(Norway)	DF	Adrian Pereira	4	0	0	0	4	0
20	(Norway)	MF	Edvard Tagseth	1	0	0	0	1	0
21	(Norway)	MF	Olaus Skarsem	4	0	0	0	4	0
22	(Sweden)	FW	Stefano Vecchia	0	0	0	0	0	0
24	(Norway)	GK	Sander Tangvik	0	0	0	0	0	0
27	(Norway)	FW	Ole Sæter	4	0	0	0	4	0
32	(Norway)	DF	Leo Cornic	2	0	0	0	2	0
33	(Norway)	DF	Tobias Solheim Dahl	0	0	0	0	0	0
34	(Norway)	MF	Dennis Bakke Gaustad	0	0	0	0	0	0
39	(Norway)	MF	Marius Sivertsen Broholm	0	0	0	0	0	0
41	(Norway)	MF	Sverre Nypan	0	0	0	0	0	0
44	(Norway)	FW	Magnus Holte	0	0	0	0	0	0
80	(Iceland)	FW	Kristall Máni Ingason	0	0	0	0	0	0
Players away from Rosenborg on loan:
4	(Norway)	MF	Vebjørn Hoff	0	0	0	0	0	0
9	(Norway)	FW	Noah Holm	1	0	0	0	1	0
14	(Sweden)	FW	Rasmus Wiedesheim-Paul	0	0	0	0	0	0
25	(Sweden)	DF	Adam Andersson	0	0	0	0	0	0
38	(Norway)	DF	Mikkel Ceïde	0	0	0	0	0	0
40	(Norway)	FW	Pawel Chrupalla	0	0	0	0	0	0
Players who appeared for Rosenborg no longer at the club:
13	(Norway)	GK	Julian Faye Lund	0	0	0	0	0	0
23	(Sweden)	MF	Pavle Vagić	1	0	0	0	1	0
29	(Norway)	FW	Bryan Fiabema	0	0	0	0	0	0
			TOTALS	44	1	3	0	47	1

== See also ==
- Rosenborg BK seasons
