= Tobias Børkeeiet =

Norwegian football player (born 1999)

Personal information
- Full name: Tobias Borchgrevink Børkeeiet
- Date of birth: 18 April 1999 (age 27)
- Place of birth: Bekkestua, Norway
- Height: 1.89 m (6 ft 2 in)
- Position: Midfielder

Team information
- Current team: Sandefjord
- Number: 8

Youth career
- 2004–2017: Stabæk

Senior career*
Years	Team	Apps	(Gls)
2018–2019	Stabæk	39	(0)
2019–2022	Brøndby	34	(1)
2022–2024	Rosenborg	48	(2)
2024–2026	Rapid Wien	17	(0)
2026–	Sandefjord	1	(0)

International career^{‡}
2016	Norway U18	3	(0)
2017–2018	Norway U19	7	(0)
2018–2019	Norway U20	11	(0)
2018–2020	Norway U21	7	(0)
- * Club domestic league appearances and goals as of 16 August 2026 ‡ National team caps and goals as of 10 August 2021

Tobias Borchgrevink Børkeeiet (born 18 April 1999) is a Norwegian professional footballer who plays as midfielder for Sandefjord.

== Club career ==
=== Stabæk ===
He grew up at Bekkestua and entered the youth department of Stabæk at the age of five. He climbed through the ranks and attended the sport secondary school NTG Bærum. On 11 March 2018, Børkeeiet made his professional debut for Stabæk, in an away match against Strømsgodset. Marcus Pedersen scored twice on behalf of the home team, but goals from Franck Boli and Ohi Omoijuanfo secured a 2–2 draw. Børkeeiet started the game on the bench and made an appearance as a substitute for Hugo Vetlesen four minutes before full-time by head coach Toni Ordinas. He scored his first goal on 5 December 2018, in a relegation play-off match against Aalesunds FK, which was the only goal of the game, as Stabæk won 1–0 and secured another season in the top-flight Eliteserien.

By the time of his departure in July 2019, he had made 44 appearances and scored one goal for Stabæk.

=== Brøndby ===
On 5 July 2019, Børkeeiet moved to Denmark to join Superliga club Brøndby IF on a five-year contract, for an undisclosed fee, reported to be around €1.1 million. He made his official debut for the club six days later as a substitute in a 4–1 home win over Inter Turku in the first qualifying round of the 2019–20 UEFA Europa League. In September, Børkeeiet suffered a hip injury keeping him out for some months. On 9 January 2020, it was decided that the injury would need surgery, which was performed a week later.

Børkeeiet returned to the pitch on 20 September 2020, making a substitute appearance in Brøndby's 2–1 away win over rivals FC Copenhagen in the Copenhagen Derby.

On 8 August 2021, Børkeeiet scored his first goal for the club – also against FC Copenhagen in the Copenhagen Derby – which ended in a 4–2 away loss.

=== Rosenborg ===
On 25 January 2022, Børkeeiet signed a three-year contract with Rosenborg. He made his competitive debut for the club on 3 April, immediately scoring a brace against defending champions Bodø/Glimt to secure a 2–2 draw.

== International career ==
Børkeeiet represented the Norway national under-19 team, and participated in the 2018 UEFA European Under-19 Championship which took place in Finland. During the tournament, he made three appearances as a starter.

Børkeeiet then played for the under-20 team at the 2019 FIFA U-20 World Cup in Poland. During the tournament, he gained three caps as a starter. He distinguished himself by providing two assists, against Uruguay (3–1 loss) and Honduras (12–0 win).

He received his first selection with the Norway under-21 team on 11 September 2018 for a UEFA Under-21 Euro 2019 qualifier against Azerbaijan, which ended in a 1–3 win.

== Career statistics ==
As of match played 16 August 2026

Appearances and goals by club, season and competition
Club	Season	League			National Cup (Note: Includes Norwegian Cup, Danish Cup)		Europe		Total	
Club	Season	Division	Apps	Goals	Apps	Goals	Apps	Goals	Apps	Goals
Stabæk	2018	Eliteserien	29	1	1	0	—		30	1
Stabæk	2019	Eliteserien	10	0	1	0	—		11	0
Stabæk	Total		39	1	2	0	—		41	1
Brøndby	2019–20	Danish Superliga	6	0	0	0	4 (Note: Appearances in the UEFA Europa League)	0	10	0
Brøndby	2020–21	Danish Superliga	21	0	1	0	—		22	0
Brøndby	2021–22	Danish Superliga	7	1	2	0	4 (Note: One appearance in UEFA Champions League, three appearances in UEFA Europa League)	0	13	1
Brøndby	Total		34	1	3	0	8	0	45	1
Rosenborg	2022	Eliteserien	27	2	1	0	—		28	2
Rosenborg	2023	Eliteserien	19	0	3	0	4 (Note: Appearances in UEFA Conference League)	0	26	0
Rosenborg	2024	Eliteserien	2	0	2	0	—		4	0
Rosenborg	Total		48	2	6	0	4	0	58	2
Rapid Wien	2024–25	Austrian Bundesliga	7	0	1	0	5	0	13	0
Rapid Wien	2025–26	Austrian Bundesliga	10	0	0	0	0	0	10	0
Rapid Wien	Total		17	0	1	0	5	0	23	0
Sandefjord	2026	Eliteserien	1	0	0	0	—		1	0
Career total			139	4	12	0	17	0	168	4

== Honours ==
Brøndby

- Danish Superliga: 2020–21
