= Sverre Nypan =

Norwegian footballer (born 2006)

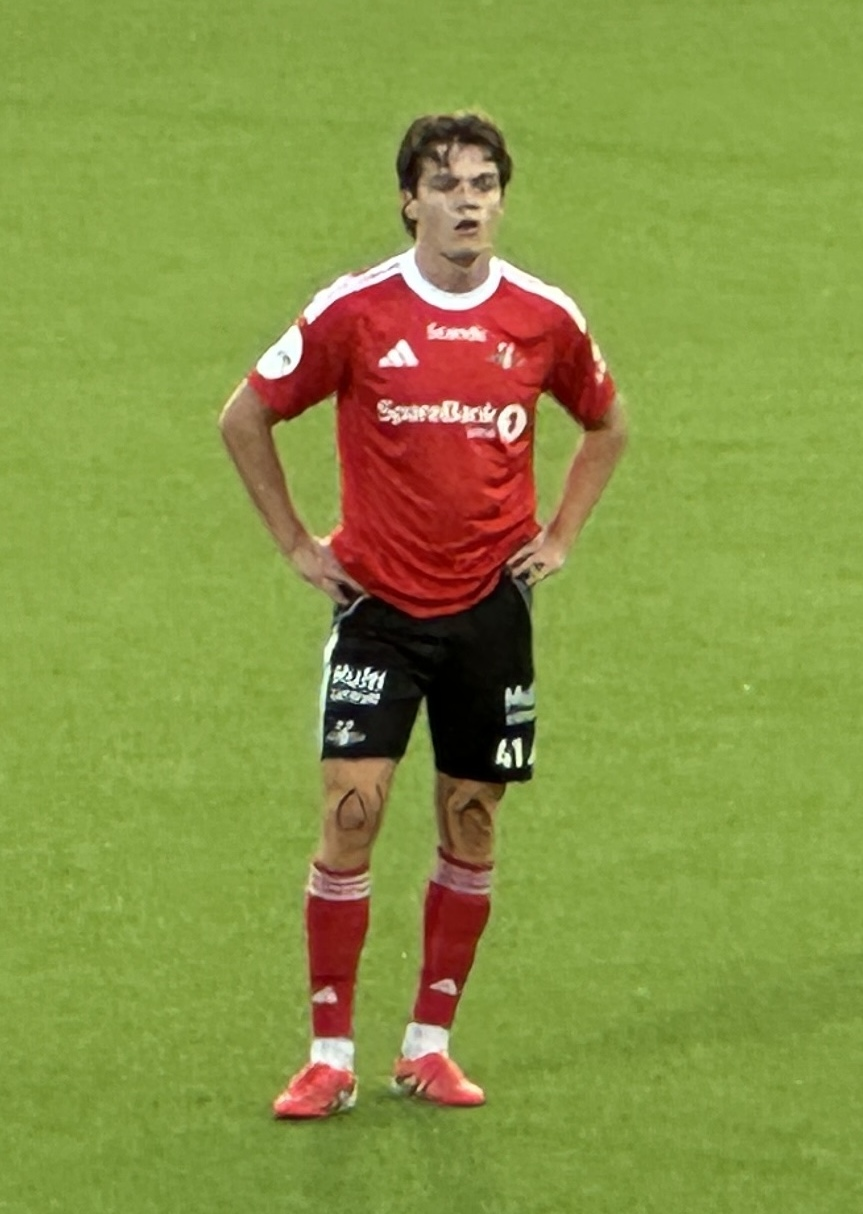
- Nypan in 2025 with Rosenborg

Personal information
- Full name: Sverre Halseth Nypan
- Date of birth: 19 December 2006 (age 19)
- Place of birth: Trondheim, Norway
- Height: 1.78 m (5 ft 10 in)
- Position: Attacking midfielder

Team information
- Current team: Lommel (on loan from Manchester City)
- Number: 41

Youth career
- –2020: Nardo
- 2020–2022: Rosenborg

Senior career*
Years	Team	Apps	(Gls)
2022–2025	Rosenborg	62	(14)
2025–	Manchester City	0	(0)
2025–2026	→ Middlesbrough (loan)	20	(0)
2026–	→ Lommel (loan)	5	(0)

International career^{‡}
2021	Norway U15	7	(10)
2022	Norway U16	12	(1)
2023	Norway U17	2	(0)
2023	Norway U18	3	(0)
2024	Norway U19	5	(1)
2024–	Norway U21	15	(1)
2025–	Norway	1	(0)
- * Club domestic league appearances and goals as of 18:24, 13 November 2026 (UTC) ‡ National team caps and goals as of 14 November 2026

Sverre Halseth Nypan (born 19 December 2006) is a Norwegian professional footballer who plays as an attacking midfielder for Belgian Pro League club Lommel, on loan from Premier League club Manchester City, and the Norway national team.

== Club career ==
=== Rosenborg ===
In January 2022, Nypan signed his first professional contract with Rosenborg. Just a few months later in April, Nypan signed a new contract and became a part of the first team squad.

On 6 November 2022, Nypan made his Rosenborg debut when he started in a league match against Jerv. In doing so, he became the youngest player ever to represent Rosenborg at 15 years and 322 days, beating John Hou Sæter's record of being youngest in an official match and Magnus Holte's record as the youngest in a league match. And since he started the match he also beat Ola By Rise's record from 1977 as youngest to start in the league.

On 13 May 2023, Nypan scored his first goal for Rosenborg in 3–2 away defeat against Bodø/Glimt in the Eliteserien. This made him the youngest ever goalscorer in the league for Rosenborg, aged 16 years and 145 days.

In September 2023, Nypan signed a new contract with Rosenborg. On 11 October 2023, he was named by English newspaper The Guardian as one of the best players born in 2006 worldwide.

=== Manchester City ===
Amid interest from a number of clubs, on 14 June 2025, Premier League club Manchester City reached an agreement for the transfer of Nypan for a fee of £12.5 million. A month later, on 17 July, the deal was made official, with Nypan signing a contract until the summer of 2030. It was later reported that Nypan had verbally agreed a move to Aston Villa before deciding to sign for City instead.

==== Middlesbrough (loan) ====
On 19 August 2025, Nypan signed for EFL Championship club Middlesbrough on a season-long loan. On 23 August, he made his debut for the club, coming on as a 72nd-minute substitute for Finn Azaz in a 2–1 away victory over Norwich City in the league. On 2 February 2026, he returned to Manchester City after his loan was mutually terminated.

==== Lommel (loan) ====
On 11 July 2026, Nypan joined Belgian Pro League side Lommel on a season-long loan.

== International career ==
On 13 October 2025, Nypan received his first senior international call-up for Norway, stepping up from the under-21 side. On 15 October, he made his debut in a 1–1 home draw in a friendly against New Zealand, appearing as an 81st-minute substitute.

== Personal life ==
His sister, Johanne Nypan, is a professional handball player for Molde Elite.

Despite playing for Manchester City, Nypan supported club rivals Manchester United growing up.

== Career statistics ==
=== Club ===
As of match played 7 November 2026

Appearances and goals by club, season and competition
Club	Season	League			National cup (Note: Includes Norwegian Cup)		League cup		Europe		Other		Total	
Club	Season	Division	Apps	Goals	Apps	Goals	Apps	Goals	Apps	Goals	Apps	Goals	Apps	Goals
Rosenborg	2022	Eliteserien	2	0	0	0	—		—		—		2	0
Rosenborg	2023	Eliteserien	23	5	2	0	—		3 (Note: Appearances in UEFA Europa Conference League)	0	—		28	5
Rosenborg	2024	Eliteserien	28	8	2	0	—		—		—		30	8
Rosenborg	2025	Eliteserien	9	1	1	0	—		—		—		10	1
Rosenborg	Total		62	14	5	0	—		3	0	—		70	14
Manchester City	2025–26	Premier League	0	0	0	0	0	0	0	0	—		0	0
Middlesbrough (loan)	2025–26	Championship	20	0	1	0	—		—		—		21	0
Lommel (loan)	2026–27	Belgian Pro League	5	0	1	0	—		—		—		6	0
Career total			87	14	7	0	0	0	3	0	0	0	97	14

=== International ===
As of match played 14 October 2025

Appearances and goals by national team and year
National team	Year	Apps	Goals
Norway	2025	1	0
Total		1	0

== Honours ==
Manchester City

- EFL Cup: 2025–26
- FA Cup: 2025–26

Individual

- Eliteserien Young Player of the Month: August 2023
- Eliteserien Young Player of the Year: 2023, 2024
