= Sam Rogers (soccer) =

American soccer player (born 1999)

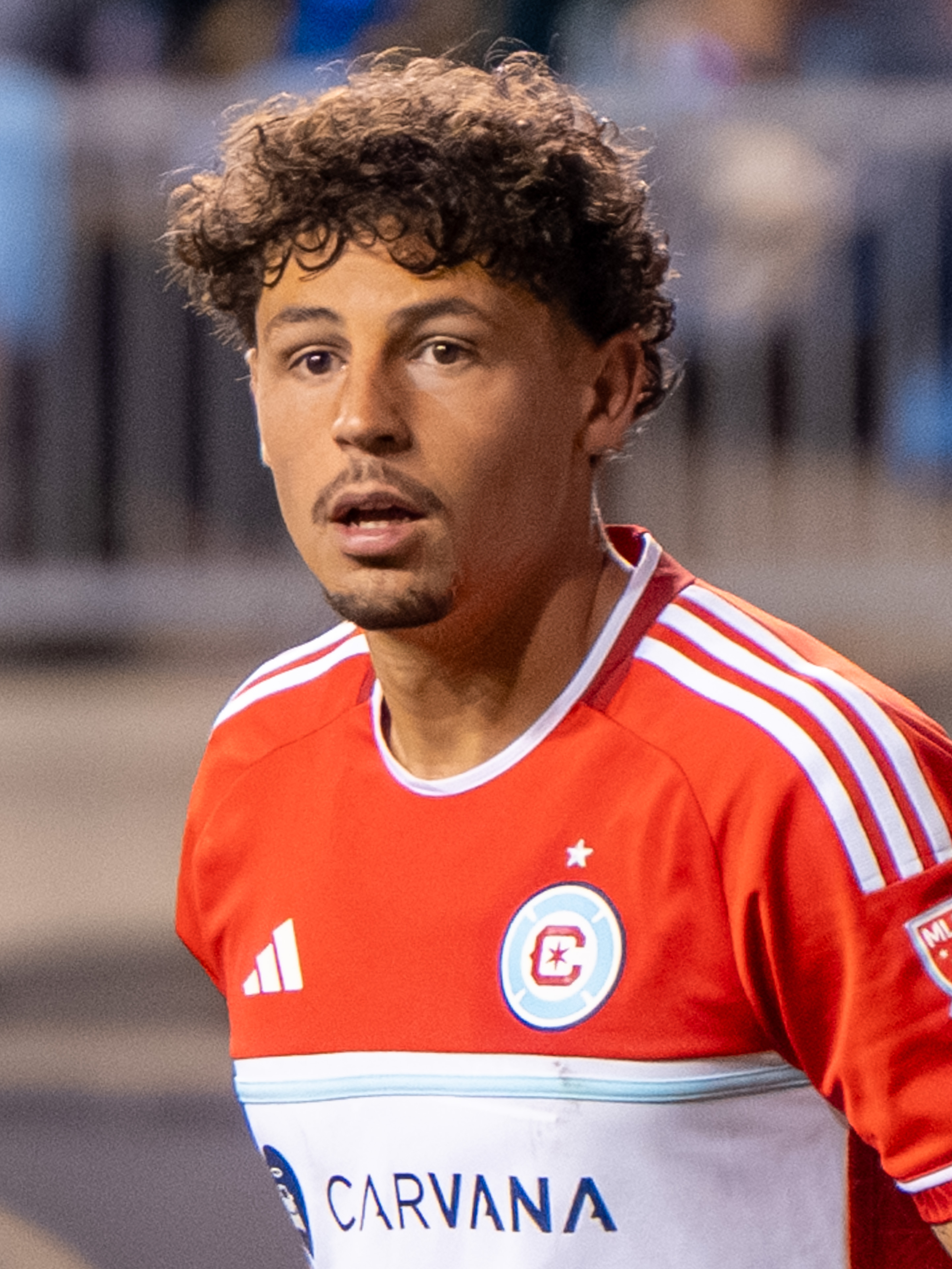
- Rogers with the Chicago Fire in 2025

Personal information
- Full name: Samual Jarard Rogers
- Date of birth: May 17, 1999 (age 27)
- Place of birth: Seattle, Washington, United States
- Height: 6 ft 3 in (1.91 m)
- Position: Center-back

Team information
- Current team: Chicago Fire
- Number: 5

Youth career
- 2013–2017: Seattle Sounders FC

Senior career*
Years	Team	Apps	(Gls)
2017–2020	Tacoma Defiance	64	(3)
2021	OKC Energy	12	(0)
2021	→ HamKam (loan)	17	(1)
2022–2023	Rosenborg	38	(6)
2023–2024	Lillestrøm	6	(0)
2024	→ HamKam (loan)	3	(0)
2024	→ Aalesund (loan)	12	(0)
2025–	Chicago Fire	30	(0)
2026	Chicago Fire II	2	(0)

International career^{‡}
2018	United States U20	3	(0)
2023	United States	1	(0)
- * Club domestic league appearances and goals as of October 12, 2026 ‡ National team caps and goals as of January 28, 2023

Samual Jarard Rogers (born May 17, 1999) is an American professional soccer player who plays as a center-back for Major League Soccer club Chicago Fire.

== Career ==
Rogers joined the Seattle Sounders FC Academy in 2013 and attended Ballard High School in Seattle. On February 23, 2017, it was announced that he signed a letter of intent to play college soccer at Villanova University. On June 13, 2017, Rogers instead chose to forgo college to sign his first professional contract with Seattle Sounders FC 2. Just six days later, on June 19, he graduated from high school.

On March 26, 2017, he made his debut for USL club Seattle Sounders FC 2 in a 2–1 defeat to Sacramento Republic. Rogers scored his first goal for Seattle Sounders FC 2 on April 25, 2017, in a 3–2 loss to San Antonio. He trialed with Standard Liege in 2019 and joined the Seattle Sounders FC preseason camp in early 2020.

In April 2021, Rogers signed with USL Championship side OKC Energy.

In August 2021, Rogers signed with Norwegian second-tier team HamKam on loan until the end of the season. After HamKam gained promotion, Rogers signed a contract for a permanent deal at the start of 2022. A month later Rosenborg, led by his former HamKam manager Kjetil Rekdal, completed the transfer of Rogers to Rosenborg.

On 31 August 2023, Rogers signed with Lillestrøm, on a contract until end of 2026.

Rogers returned on the United States on January 13, 2025, signing a two-year deal with Chicago Fire for an undisclosed fee.

== Career statistics ==
=== Club ===
As of September 3, 2024

Club	Season	League			National cup (Note: Includes U.S. Open Cup, Norwegian Cup)		Continental		Total	
Club	Season	Division	Apps	Goals	Apps	Goals	Apps	Goals	Apps	Goals
Seattle Sounders	2017	MLS	0	0	2	0	—		2	0
Tacoma Defiance	2017	USL Championship	25	2	—		—		25	2
Tacoma Defiance	2018	USL Championship	11	0	—		—		11	0
Tacoma Defiance	2019	USL Championship	20	0	—		—		20	0
Tacoma Defiance	2020	USL Championship	8	1	—		—		8	1
Tacoma Defiance	Total		64	3	—		—		64	3
OKC Energy	2021	USL Championship	12	0	—		—		12	0
HamKam (loan)	2021	1. divisjon	17	1	1	0	—		18	1
Rosenborg	2022	Eliteserien	23	6	2	0	—		25	6
Rosenborg	2023	Eliteserien	15	0	3	0	1 (Note: Appearance in UEFA Conference League)	0	18	0
Rosenborg	Total		38	6	5	0	1	0	43	6
Lillestrøm	2023	Eliteserien	6	0	0	0	—		6	0
HamKam (loan)	2024	Eliteserien	3	0	3	0	—		6	0
Aalesund (loan)	2024	1. divisjon	4	0	0	0	—		4	0
Career total			144	10	11	0	1	0	156	10

=== International ===
As of match played January 28, 2023

Appearances and goals by national team and year
National team	Year	Apps	Goals
United States	2023	1	0
Total		1	0

== Honors ==
United States U20

- CONCACAF U-20 Championship: 2018
