= Marius Broholm =

Norwegian footballer (born 2004)

Personal information
- Full name: Marius Sivertsen Broholm
- Date of birth: 26 December 2004 (age 21)
- Place of birth: Trondheim, Norway
- Height: 1.73 m (5 ft 8 in)
- Positions: Winger; attacking midfielder

Team information
- Current team: Utrecht (on loan from Lille)
- Number: 80

Youth career
- –2018: Tiller
- 2019–2021: Rosenborg

Senior career*
Years	Team	Apps	(Gls)
2021–2025	Rosenborg	51	(13)
2023	→ Kristiansund (loan)	27	(7)
2025–	Lille	11	(1)
2026–	→ Utrecht (loan)	3	(0)

International career^{‡}
2023	Norway U20	3	(0)
2024–	Norway U21	16	(4)
- * Club domestic league appearances and goals as of 20 September 2026 ‡ National team caps and goals as of 14 November 2026

Marius Sivertsen Broholm (born 26 December 2004) is a Norwegian professional footballer who plays as a winger or attacking midfielder for Eredivisie club Utrecht, on loan from Ligue 1 club Lille.

== Club career ==
Broholm made his Rosenborg debut in July 2021 when he came on and scored against Melhus in the Norwegian Cup.

In January 2022 Broholm signed his first professional contract with Rosenborg.

On 8 May 2022 Broholm made his league debut against Strømsgodset coming on in the 73rd minute.

In May 2023, Broholm went on a one month loan to Kristansund that was later extended until the end of the season. In December, he scored to make it 2–0 against Vålerenga which made it 2–2 on aggregate in the play off finals for a place in the Eliteserien. He later scored a penalty as Kristiansund gained promotion after winning 5-4 on penalties.

On 18 June 2025, Broholm signed for Ligue 1 club Lille on a five-year contract running until 2030, for a reported initial fee of €5 million, a maximum of around €2 million potential add-ons and an undisclosed sell-on clause.

== Career statistics ==
As of match played 20 September 2026

Appearances and goals by club, season and competition
Club	Season	League			National cup (Note: Includes Norwegian Football Cup)		Europe		Other		Total	
Club	Season	Division	Apps	Goals	Apps	Goals	Apps	Goals	Apps	Goals	Apps	Goals
Rosenborg	2021	Eliteserien	0	0	1	1	0	0	–		1	1
Rosenborg	2022	Eliteserien	9	0	2	2	–		–		11	2
Rosenborg	2023	Eliteserien	2	0	0	0	0	0	–		2	0
Rosenborg	2024	Eliteserien	29	8	2	2	–		–		31	10
Rosenborg	2025	Eliteserien	11	5	1	1	0	0	–		12	6
Rosenborg	Total		51	13	6	6	0	0	–		57	19
Kristiansund (loan)	2023	Norwegian First Division	27	7	3	0	–		4 (Note: Appearances in Norwegian First Division promotion play-offs)	3	34	10
Lille	2025–26	Ligue 1	11	1	1	1	2 (Note: Appearances in UEFA Europa League)	0	–		14	2
Utrecht (loan)	2026–27	Eredivisie	3	0	0	0	–		0	0	3	0
Career total			92	21	10	7	2	0	4	3	108	31

== Honours ==
Individual

- Eliteserien Player of the Month: August 2024
- Eliteserien Young Player of the Month: August 2024
