= Ole Sæter =

Norwegian footballer (born 1996)

Personal information
- Full name: Ole Christian Hammerfjell Sæter
- Date of birth: 30 March 1996 (age 30)
- Place of birth: Trondheim, Norway
- Height: 1.93 m (6 ft 4 in)
- Position: Forward

Team information
- Current team: Vålerenga
- Number: 90

Youth career
- –2010: Freidig
- 2011–2015: Trond

Senior career*
Years	Team	Apps	(Gls)
2016–2017	Sverresborg	39	(8)
2018	Kristiansund 2	20	(14)
2019	Nardo	20	(7)
2020	Ranheim	19	(8)
2021–2026	Rosenborg	76	(33)
2021	→ Ullensaker/Kisa (loan)	6	(0)
2026–	Vålerenga	15	(3)
- * Club domestic league appearances and goals as of 21 November 2026

Ole Christian Hammerfjell Sæter (born 30 March 1996) is a Norwegian professional footballer who plays as a forward for Eliteserien club Vålerenga.

== Club career ==
Sæter first caught the attention of Rosenborg when he played for Ranheim in 2020, later joining Rosenborg in January 2021. He made his first-team debut on 30 May 2021 when he came on as a substitute in Rosenborg's Eliteserien match against Stabæk.

In September 2024, amid the Gaza genocide during the Gaza war, Sæter rejected a reportedly lucrative bid from Israeli club Maccabi Haifa, referring to it as "blood money" and stating that "[his] values are more important".

== International career ==
Sæter is eligible to represent Pakistan as his maternal grandfather was Pakistani. In October 2022, Sæter declined any chance to play for Pakistan during a podcast with Nettavisen.

== Career statistics ==
=== Club ===
As of match played 21 November 2026

Appearances and goals by club, season and competition
Club	Season	League			Norwegian Cup		Europe		Other		Total	
Club	Season	Division	Apps	Goals	Apps	Goals	Apps	Goals	Apps	Goals	Apps	Goals
Sverresborg	2016	Norsk Tipping-Ligaen	20	5	1	0	—		—		21	5
Sverresborg	2017	Norsk Tipping-Ligaen	19	3	1	1	—		—		20	4
Sverresborg	Total		39	8	2	1	—		—		41	9
Kristiansund 2	2018	Norsk Tipping-Ligaen	20	14	—		—		—		20	14
Nardo	2019	PostNord-Ligaen	20	7	2	0	—		—		22	7
Ranheim	2020	OBOS-ligaen	19	8	—		—		1 (Note: Appearances in promotion play-offs)	3	20	11
Rosenborg	2021	Eliteserien	1	0	0	0	0	0	—		1	0
Rosenborg	2022	Eliteserien	20	14	2	2	—		—		22	16
Rosenborg	2023	Eliteserien	12	8	0	0	2 (Note: Appearances in UEFA Conference League)	1	—		14	9
Rosenborg	2024	Eliteserien	23	10	1	0	—		—		24	10
Rosenborg	2025	Eliteserien	20	1	5	4	3	1	—		28	6
Rosenborg	Total		76	33	8	6	5	2	—		89	41
Ullensaker/Kisa (loan)	2021	OBOS-ligaen	6	0	—		—		—		6	0
Vålerenga	2026	Eliteserien	15	3	3	2	0	0	—		18	5
Career total			195	73	15	9	5	2	1	3	216	87

== Honours ==
Individual

- Eliteserien Goal of the Season: 2024
