= Leo Cornic =

Norwegian footballer (born 2001)

Personal information
- Full name: Leo Erik Jean Cornic
- Date of birth: 2 January 2001 (age 25)
- Place of birth: Oslo, Norway
- Height: 1.78 m (5 ft 10 in)
- Positions: Full-back; wing-back

Team information
- Current team: Brann
- Number: 2

Youth career
- 2010–2017: Vålerenga

Senior career*
Years	Team	Apps	(Gls)
2018–2019	Vålerenga 2	26	(2)
2018–2020	Vålerenga	0	(0)
2019	→ Bærum (loan)	10	(0)
2020	Grorud	24	(3)
2021–2022	Djurgårdens IF	12	(0)
2022–2024	Rosenborg	44	(4)
2023–2024	Rosenborg 2	10	(3)
2024–2026	Tromsø	54	(8)
2026–	Brann	3	(0)

International career^{‡}
2017	Norway U16	11	(0)
2018	Norway U17	13	(1)
2019	Norway U18	10	(1)
2021	Norway U19	2	(0)
2021	Norway U20	1	(0)
2019	Norway U21	1	(0)
- * Club domestic league appearances and goals as of 13 September 2026 ‡ National team caps and goals as of 20 August 2024

Leo Erik Jean Cornic (born 2 January 2001) is a Norwegian footballer who plays as a defender for the Norwegian professional football club Brann.

== Career ==
=== Vålerenga ===
In 2010, nine years old, Cornic started playing for Vålerenga's youth teams. He would later rise through the ranks and found himself playing for their second team in the Norwegian Second Division by 2018. The same year, Cornic signed his first professional contract with the club, lasting until the end of the 2020 season. In 2019 he would get his debut for the first team, in a cup tie against Faaberg, which would go on to be the only game he would play for Vålerenga's first team.

After impressing with his appearances for Vålerenga's second team, Cornic was loaned out to Bærum for the latter half of the 2019 season. Cornic was capped ten times for the Norwegian Second Division side, before returning back to Vålerenga.

=== Grorud ===
Ahead of the 2020 season, Cornic was sold to newly promoted Norwegian First Division club Grorud.

=== Djurgården IF ===
After only one season at Grorud, Cornic moved to Swedish side Djurgårdens IF on a four-year contract. The sale marked Grorud's first time selling a player to an international club. At Djurgården Cornic struggled to establish himself as a starter, and would go on to appear only fifteen times in all competitions over his two seasons there.

=== Rosenborg ===
On 15 August 2022, after one-and-a-half seasons at Djurgården IF, Rosenborg announced that Cornic had signed on for them until the end of 2026. Cornic cited that he chose Rosenborg because they were the biggest club in Norway, and that he believed in the head coach Kjetil Rekdal. In the summer of 2023, Cornic scored the winning goal in the second round of the 2023–24 UEFA Europa Conference League qualifying against Crusaders.

=== Tromsø ===
After gradually losing his starting position at Rosenborg under their new head coach Alfred Johansson, Tromsø wanted to sign Cornic in the summer of 2024. On 31 July, he was announced as their new signing, on a contract running through the 2027 season. Only four days after signing with Tromsø, Cornic headed back to Lerkendal Stadion to face his former teammates in a 1–0 defeat, playing the last twenty minutes of the game. The same month Cornic would go on to play both of Tromsø's third round fixtures against Scottish club Kilmarnock in the 2024–25 UEFA Conference League qualifying, eventually losing out 3–2 on aggregates.

== Personal life ==
Cornic's father is French, and he spent some time in his childhood living and playing football in France.

== Career statistics ==
=== Club ===
As of 16 September 2026

Appearances and goals by club, season and competition
Club	Season	League			National Cup (Note: Includes Svenska Cupen, Norwegian Cup)		Europe		Total	
Club	Season	Division	Apps	Goals	Apps	Goals	Apps	Goals	Apps	Goals
Vålerenga 2	2018	2. divisjon	15	1	—		—		15	1
Vålerenga 2	2019	3. divisjon	11	1	—		—		11	1
Vålerenga 2	Total		26	2	—		—		26	2
Vålerenga	2018	Eliteserien	0	0	0	0	—		0	0
Vålerenga	2019	Eliteserien	0	0	1	0	—		1	0
Vålerenga	Total		0	0	1	0	—		1	0
Bærum (loan)	2019	2. divisjon	10	0	0	0	—		10	0
Grorud	2020	1. divisjon	24	3	—		—		24	3
Djurgårdens IF	2021	Allsvenskan	7	0	3	0	—		10	0
Djurgårdens IF	2022	Allsvenskan	5	0	0	0	0	0	5	0
Djurgårdens IF	Total		12	0	3	0	0	0	15	0
Rosenborg	2022	Eliteserien	12	3	0	0	—		12	3
Rosenborg	2023	Eliteserien	25	1	2	0	3 (Note: Appearances in UEFA Conference League)	1	30	2
Rosenborg	2024	Eliteserien	7	0	2	0	—		9	0
Rosenborg	Total		44	4	4	0	3	1	51	5
Rosenborg 2	2023	3. divisjon	7	2	—		—		7	2
Rosenborg 2	2024	3. divisjon	3	1	—		—		3	1
Rosenborg 2	Total		10	3	—		—		10	3
Tromsø	2024	Eliteserien	10	3	0	0	2	0	12	3
Tromsø	2025	Eliteserien	29	5	2	0	—		31	5
Tromsø	2026	Eliteserien	15	0	1	0	1 (Note: Appearances in UEFA Europa League)	0	17	0
Tromsø	Total		54	8	3	0	3	0	60	8
Brann	2026	Eliteserien	3	0	1	0	0	0	4	0
Career total			183	20	12	0	6	1	201	21
