= Mikkel Konradsen Ceïde =

Norwegian footballer (born 2001)

Personal information
- Date of birth: 3 September 2001 (age 25)
- Place of birth: Finnsnes, Norway
- Height: 1.75 m (5 ft 9 in)
- Positions: Midfielder; defender

Team information
- Current team: Rosenborg
- Number: 4

Youth career
- –2017: Finnsnes
- 2017–2020: Rosenborg

Senior career*
Years	Team	Apps	(Gls)
2020–2021	Rosenborg 2	24	(0)
2020–	Rosenborg	77	(1)
2021	→ Ranheim (loan)	15	(1)
2022	→ Utsiktens (loan)	16	(0)
2022	→ Tromsø (loan)	2	(0)
2023	→ Kristiansund (loan)	19	(0)
- * Club domestic league appearances and goals as of 22 November 2026

Mikkel Konradsen Ceïde (born 3 September 2001) is a Norwegian footballer who plays for Norwegian club Rosenborg.

== Club career ==
Mikkel signed for Rosenborg from Finnsnes in May 2017 along with his brother Emil.

On 25 July 2021, he made his debut for Rosenborg when he came on against Melhus in a Cup game which Rosenborg won 7-0. He played alongside his brother Emil and as a result became the first twins to ever play an official match for Rosenborg. A few days later he came on and played against Icelandic FH in the Europa Conference League second qualifying round.

On 22 August, Mikkel made his league debut in a 5-0 win over Odd coming on as a substitute. Four days later he signed a new contract and was sent out on loan to Ranheim.

On 21 March 2022, Konradsen Ceïde moved on a new loan to Utsikten in the Swedish second-tier Superettan. He returned from loan in August and went out on a new loan to Tromsø.

In 2023, Konradsen Ceïde was sent out on season long loan to Kristiansund.

== Personal life ==
Mikkel's father is Haitian while his mother is Norwegian. His twin brother Emil, a fellow footballer, plays for Serie A team Sassuolo. He is second cousins with former footballer Anders Konradsen and Haugesund player Morten Konradsen.

== Career statistics ==
As of 22 November 2026

Appearances and goals by club, season and competition
Club	Season	Division	League		National Cup		Europe		Total	
Club	Season	Division	Apps	Goals	Apps	Goals	Apps	Goals	Apps	Goals
Rosenborg	2020	Eliteserien	0	0	—		0	0	0	0
Rosenborg	2021	Eliteserien	1	0	2	0	1 (Note: Appearance in the UEFA Conference League)	0	4	0
Rosenborg	2023	Eliteserien	5	0	0	0	—		5	0
Rosenborg	2024	Eliteserien	27	1	1	0	—		28	1
Rosenborg	2025	Eliteserien	25	0	2	0	5 (Note: Appearance in the UEFA Conference League)	1	32	1
Rosenborg	2026	Eliteserien	19	0	1	0	—		20	0
Rosenborg	Total		77	1	6	0	6	1	89	2
Ranheim (loan)	2021	OBOS-ligaen	15	1	1	0	—		16	1
Ranheim (loan)	Total		15	1	1	0	—		16	1
Utsiktens (loan)	2022	Superettan	16	0	0	0	—		16	0
Utsiktens (loan)	Total		16	0	0	0	—		16	0
Tromsø (loan)	2022	Eliteserien	2	0	0	0	—		2	0
Tromsø (loan)	Total		2	0	0	0	—		2	0
Kristiansund (loan)	2023	OBOS-ligaen	19	0	3	0	—		22	0
Kristiansund (loan)	Total		19	0	3	0	—		22	0
Career total			129	2	10	0	6	1	145	3
