= Bryan Fiabema =

Norwegian footballer (born 2003)

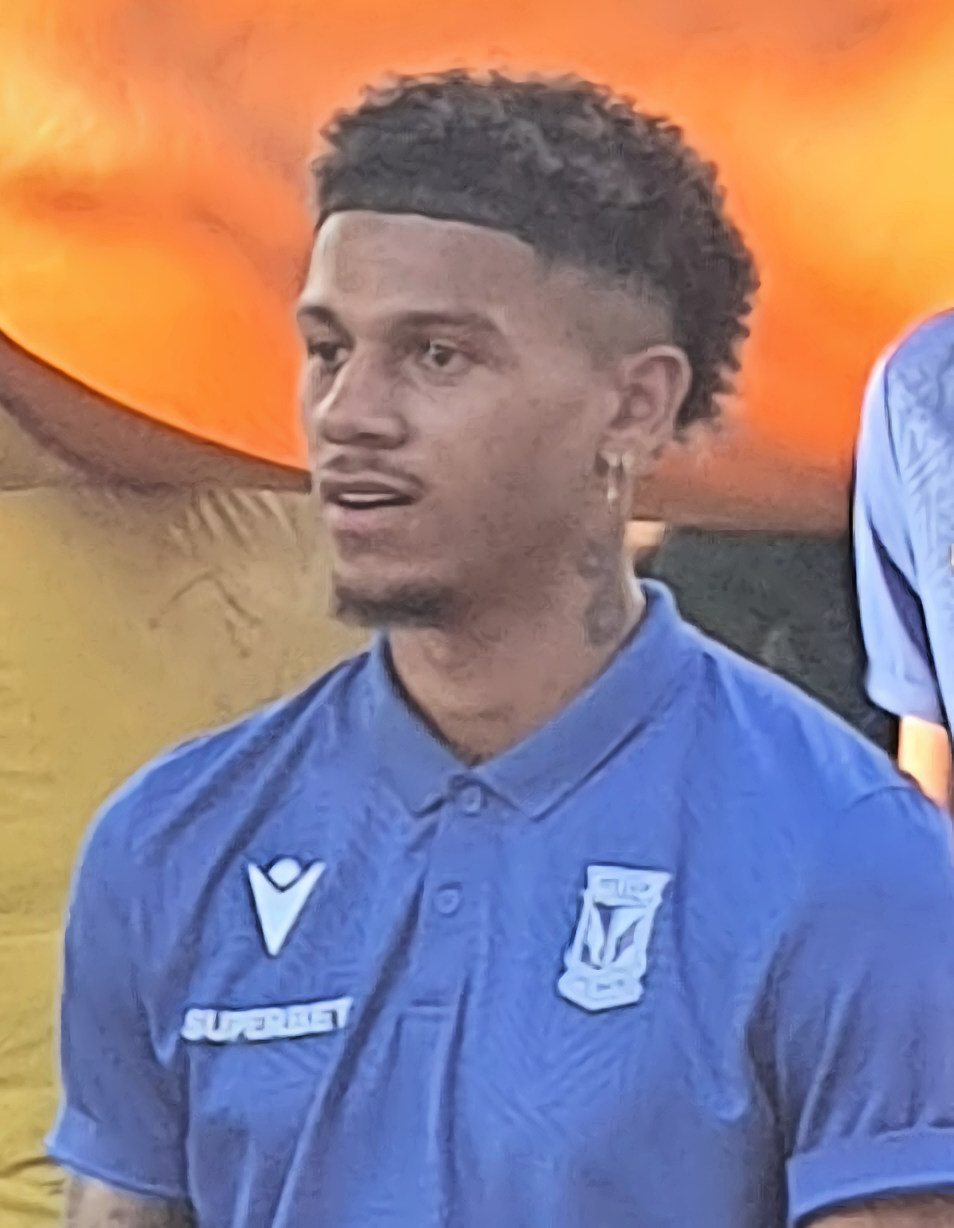
- Fiabema with Lech Poznań in 2024

Personal information
- Full name: Bryan Benjamin Fiabema
- Date of birth: 16 February 2003 (age 23)
- Place of birth: Tromsø, Norway
- Height: 1.83 m (6 ft 0 in)
- Position: Forward

Team information
- Current team: Fredrikstad
- Number: 18

Youth career
- –2015: Krokelvdalen
- 2016–2019: Tromsø

Senior career*
Years	Team	Apps	(Gls)
2019–2020	Tromsø	1	(0)
2020–2023	Chelsea	0	(0)
2022	→ Rosenborg (loan)	11	(1)
2022	→ Rosenborg 2 (loan)	5	(1)
2022–2023	→ Forest Green Rovers (loan)	12	(0)
2023–2024	Real Sociedad B	30	(5)
2024–2026	Lech Poznań	38	(2)
2024–2025	Lech Poznań II	3	(1)
2026	→ ADO Den Haag (loan)	16	(4)
2026–	Fredrikstad	6	(3)

International career
2018	Norway U15	7	(2)
2019	Norway U16	12	(3)
2020	Norway U17	6	(4)
2021	Norway U18	8	(6)
2022	Norway U19	4	(0)
2022–2023	Norway U20	6	(3)
2023–2024	Norway U21	5	(2)
- * Club domestic league appearances and goals as of 25 October 2026

Bryan Benjamin Fiabema (born 16 February 2003) is a Norwegian professional footballer who plays as a forward for Eliteserien club Fredrikstad.

== Club career ==
Fiabema joined Chelsea from Tromsø in January 2020 after a successful trial. In March 2022, Fiabema joined Norwegian top-flight side Rosenborg on loan.

Fiabema was recalled early from his loan to Rosenborg in August 2022, and joined League One side Forest Green Rovers on a season-long loan on 1 September. On 16 June 2023, Chelsea announced that he would leave the club when his contract expired at the end of the month.

On 11 August 2023, Fiabema signed for Real Sociedad.

On 10 July 2024, Fiabema joined Polish Ekstraklasa club Lech Poznań on a three-year contract, with a one-year extension option, for an undisclosed fee. On 23 January 2026, Fiabema moved on loan to ADO Den Haag in the Netherlands, with an option to buy.

On 25 August 2026, Fiabema returned to Norway to sign with Fredrikstad for a reported fee of €140,000.

== International career ==
Born in Norway, Fiabema was born to a Nigerian father and Norwegian mother. He has represented Norway at all levels from under-15 to under-21.

== Personal life ==
Fiabema is the cousin of the Tunisian footballer Sebastian Tounekti.

== Career statistics ==
As of match played 25 October 2026

Appearances and goals by club, season and competition
Club	Season	League			National cup (Note: Includes Norwegian Cup, Polish Cup)		Continental		Other		Total	
Club	Season	Division	Apps	Goals	Apps	Goals	Apps	Goals	Apps	Goals	Apps	Goals
Tromsø	2019	Eliteserien	1	0	0	0	—		—		1	0
Chelsea U21	2020–21	—			—		—		1 (Note: Appearance(s) in EFL Trophy)	0	1	0
Chelsea U21	2021–22	—			—		—		3	1	3	1
Chelsea U21	Total		—		—		—		4	1	4	1
Rosenborg (loan)	2022	Eliteserien	11	1	3	1	—		—		14	2
Rosenborg 2 (loan)	2022	3. divisjon	5	1	—		—		—		5	1
Forest Green Rovers (loan)	2022–23	League One	12	0	0	0	—		1	1	13	1
Real Sociedad B	2023–24	Primera Federación	30	5	0	0	—		—		30	5
Lech Poznań	2024–25	Ekstraklasa	28	0	1	0	—		—		29	0
Lech Poznań	2025–26	Ekstraklasa	10	2	1	0	7 (Note: Three appearances in UEFA Champions League, two appearances in UEFA Europa League, two appearances in UEFA Conference League)	0	1 (Note: Appearance in Polish Super Cup)	0	19	2
Lech Poznań	Total		38	2	2	0	7	0	1	0	48	2
Lech Poznań II	2024–25	III liga, gr. II	2	0	0	0	—		—		2	0
Lech Poznań II	2025–26	III liga, gr. II	1	1	—		—		—		1	1
Lech Poznań II	Total		3	1	0	0	—		—		3	1
ADO Den Haag (loan)	2025–26	Eerste Divisie	16	4	—		—		—		16	4
Fredrikstad	2026	Eliteserien	6	3	1	0	—		—		7	3
Career total			122	17	6	1	7	0	6	2	141	20

== Honours ==
Lech Poznań

- Ekstraklasa: 2024–25

ADO Den Haag

- Eerste Divisie: 2025–26
