= Paweł Chrupałła =

Polish-Norwegian footballer (born 2003)

Personal information
- Full name: Paweł Chrupałła
- Date of birth: 16 March 2003 (age 23)
- Place of birth: Szprotawa, Poland
- Height: 1.84 m (6 ft 0 in)
- Position: Winger

Team information
- Current team: Kristianstad
- Number: 20

Youth career
- –2020: Fredrikstad
- 2020–2021: Rosenborg

Senior career*
Years	Team	Apps	(Gls)
2021–2024	Rosenborg	4	(1)
2021	→ Stjørdals-Blink (loan)	1	(0)
2022	→ Kristiansund (loan)	9	(0)
2023	→ Wisła Płock (loan)	14	(1)
2024	→ Sarpsborg 08 (loan)	11	(2)
2025	Halmstad	11	(1)
2025	→ Helsingborg (loan)	5	(0)
2026	Egersund	7	(1)
2026–	Kristianstad	9	(0)

International career
2020	Poland U17	2	(0)
2021	Norway U18	2	(0)
2022	Poland U20	2	(0)
- * Club domestic league appearances and goals as of 16 November 2026

Paweł Chrupałła (born 16 March 2003) is a professional footballer who plays as a winger for Ettan Södra club Kristianstad. Born in Poland, he has represented both his country of birth and Norway as a youth international.

== Club career ==
Chrupałła joined Rosenborg's academy from Fredrikstad ahead of the 2020 season. At the end of the year, he signed his first professional contract.

In the second half of 2021, Chrupałła was loaned out to first division team Stjørdals-Blink for the remainder of the season. However, after appearing in just one fixture, an injury prevented him from playing more.

Chrupałła made his Rosenborg debut in June 2022, when he came on against Levanger in the Norwegian Cup. A few days later, he made his league debut, coming on against Kristiansund.

On 23 July 2022, Chrupałła scored his first goal for Rosenborg on a free kick in a league match against Tromsø.

In August 2022, he was sent out on loan to Kristiansund until the end of 2023.

On 23 December 2022, Chrupałła was loaned out again, joining Polish Ekstraklasa club Wisła Płock beginning on 1 January 2023 until the end of the year, with an option to make the move permanent.

On 11 May 2024, he joined Sarpsborg 08 on loan. He made his debut the following day as a second-half substitute in a 4–1 loss to Sandefjord. In his second appearance, in a 1–7 home defeat to HamKam on 16 May, Chrupałła scored his first goal for the club. He followed that up by recording a goal and an assist in a 2–4 away win over Molde on 20 May.

After returning to Rosenborg, he left the club at the end of his contract in December 2024.'

On 7 January 2025, Chrupałła joined Swedish top-tier side Halmstad.

On 29 August 2025, he was sent on loan to Helsingborgs IF for the rest of the season with an option to buy. After returning from loan, Chrupałła left Halmstad by mutual consent on 15 December 2025.

On 18 December 2025, Chrupałła returned to Norway and signed with second-tier outfit Egersund. He left the club in August 2026, having scored once in seven league appearances.

On 1 September 2026, Chrupałła joined Kristianstad in Sweden's third division.

== Career statistics ==
As of match played 16 November 2026

Appearances and goals by club, season and competition
Club	Season	League			National cup (Note: Includes Norwegian Cup, Polish Cup, Svenska Cupen)		Total	
Club	Season	Division	Apps	Goals	Apps	Goals	Apps	Goals
Rosenborg	2021	Eliteserien	0	0	0	0	0	0
Rosenborg	2022	Eliteserien	4	1	2	0	6	1
Rosenborg	2024	Eliteserien	0	0	0	0	0	0
Rosenborg	Total		4	1	2	0	6	1
Stjørdals-Blink (loan)	2021	1. divisjon	1	0	0	0	1	0
Kristiansund (loan)	2022	Eliteserien	9	0	1	0	10	0
Wisła Płock (loan)	2022–23	Ekstraklasa	2	0	0	0	2	0
Wisła Płock (loan)	2023–24	I liga	12	1	1	0	13	1
Wisła Płock (loan)	Total		14	1	1	0	15	1
Sarpsborg 08 (loan)	2024	Eliteserien	11	2	0	0	11	2
Halmstad	2025	Allsvenskan	11	1	4	3	15	4
Helsingborg (loan)	2025	Superettan	5	0	0	0	5	0
Egersunds	2026	1. divisjon	7	1	0	0	7	1
Kristianstad	2026	Ettan Södra	9	0	0	0	9	0
Career total			71	6	8	3	79	9
