= Håkon Røsten =

Norwegian footballer (born 2005)

Personal information
- Date of birth: 21 February 2005 (age 21)
- Place of birth: Oppdal Municipality, Norway
- Height: 1.89 m (6 ft 2 in)
- Position: Defender

Team information
- Current team: KFUM
- Number: 24

Youth career
- –2020: Oppdal
- 2021–2022: Rosenborg

Senior career*
Years	Team	Apps	(Gls)
2022–2026	Rosenborg	26	(2)
2024–2025	→ Ranheim (loan)	41	(1)
2026–	KFUM	9	(0)

International career^{‡}
2021	Norway U16	8	(0)
2022	Norway U17	4	(0)
2023	Norway U18	12	(2)
2024	Norway U19	10	(0)
2025–	Norway U20	8	(0)
2026–	Norway U21	1	(0)
- * Club domestic league appearances and goals as of 13 November 2026 ‡ National team caps and goals as of 13 November 2026

Håkon Røsten (born 21 February 2005) is a Norwegian footballer who plays for Norwegian club KFUM.

== Club career ==
Håkon signed for Rosenborg from Oppdal in 2022. At the end of the year he signed a new contract and became a part of the first team squad.

He made his debut 19 May 2022 against Verdal in the Norwegian Cup.

On 4 September 2022, Håkon made his league debut in a 4-1 win over Viking coming on as a substitute.

On 6 August 2023, he scored his first goal in a league match in a 2-1 away win against Haugesund.

== Career statistics ==
=== Club ===
As of 4 October 2026

Appearances and goals by club, season and competition
Club	Season	Division	League		Cup		Continental		Total	
Club	Season	Division	Apps	Goals	Apps	Goals	Apps	Goals	Apps	Goals
Rosenborg	2022	Eliteserien	3	0	2	0	0	0	5	0
Rosenborg	2023	Eliteserien	15	2	1	0	3	0	19	2
Rosenborg	2026	Eliteserien	8	0	1	0	0	0	9	0
Rosenborg	Total		26	2	4	0	3	0	33	2
Ranheim (loan)	2024	1. divisjon	15	0	1	0	0	0	16	0
Ranheim (loan)	2025	1. divisjon	26	1	4	0	0	0	30	1
Ranheim (loan)	Total		41	1	5	0	0	0	46	1
KFUM	2026	Eliteserien	5	0	2	0	0	0	7	0
Career total			72	3	11	0	3	0	86	3
