= Adrian Pereira =

Norwegian footballer (born 1999)

Personal information
- Full name: Adrian Nilsen Pereira
- Date of birth: 31 August 1999 (age 27)
- Place of birth: Stavanger, Norway
- Height: 1.85 m (6 ft 1 in)
- Position: Left-back

Team information
- Current team: Rosenborg
- Number: 19

Youth career
- 2010–2012: Stavanger IF
- 2013–2017: Viking

Senior career*
Years	Team	Apps	(Gls)
2017–2020	Viking	33	(4)
2020–2021	PAOK	10	(0)
2021–	Rosenborg	110	(10)

International career^{‡}
2019–2020	Norway U21	2	(0)
- * Club domestic league appearances and goals as of 24 October 2026 ‡ National team caps and goals as of 15 June 2019

Adrian Nilsen Pereira (born 31 August 1999) is a Norwegian professional footballer who plays as a left-back for Norwegian club Rosenborg. He is a son of former Viking FK player Thomas Pereira. The Pereira name comes from Adrian Pereira's great-grandfather, who was born in Protectorate of Uganda and grew up in Portuguese Goa.

== Club career ==
Pereira, at the age of 13, he was transferred to Viking. After four years he was promoted to the first team, and on 26 November 2017 he made his official, full debut in a match against Stabaek. A year later he signed his first professional contract, and gradually earned a regular place in the starting XI. In the 2018–19 and 2019–20 seasons he made a total of 39 appearances, scoring four goals, contributing eight assists, and celebrated one Norwegian Cup. In 2019 he was also called up to the Norway U 21 squad, for whom he has made two appearances.

On 12 September 2020, PAOK announced the signing of Adrian Nilsen Pereira from Viking, to four-year contract and wearing the number 16 jersey. On 24 August 2021, PAOK accepted Rosenborg BK's offer for Pereira, and after a year returned to his homeland. PAOK had given €750.000 to the Viking in September 2020 but he did not establish himself with the club, and according to information, the transfer fee was a corresponding amount, keeping a resale percentage.

== Career statistics ==
=== Club ===
As of match played 28 October 2026

Appearances and goals by club, season and competition
Club	Season	League			National Cup		Continental		Total	
Club	Season	Division	Apps	Goals	Apps	Goals	Apps	Goals	Apps	Goals
Viking	2017	Eliteserien	1	0	1	0	—		2	0
Viking	2018	1. divisjon	0	0	0	0	—		0	0
Viking	2019	Eliteserien	17	2	5	0	—		22	2
Viking	2020	Eliteserien	15	2	0	0	0	0	15	2
Viking	Total		33	4	6	0	0	0	39	4
PAOK	2020–21	Super League Greece	10	0	2	0	0	0	12	0
Rosenborg	2021	Eliteserien	2	0	0	0	0	0	2	0
Rosenborg	2022	Eliteserien	21	2	2	1	0	0	23	3
Rosenborg	2023	Eliteserien	26	2	3	0	4	0	33	2
Rosenborg	2024	Eliteserien	19	3	1	0	0	0	20	3
Rosenborg	2025	Eliteserien	23	1	3	0	6	0	32	1
Rosenborg	2026	Eliteserien	19	2	3	0	0	0	22	2
Rosenborg	Total		110	10	12	1	10	0	132	11
Career total			153	14	20	1	10	0	183	15

== Honours ==
Viking

- Norwegian Football Cup: 2019

PAOK

- Greek Cup: 2020–21
