= Sander Tangvik =

Norwegian footballer (born 2002)

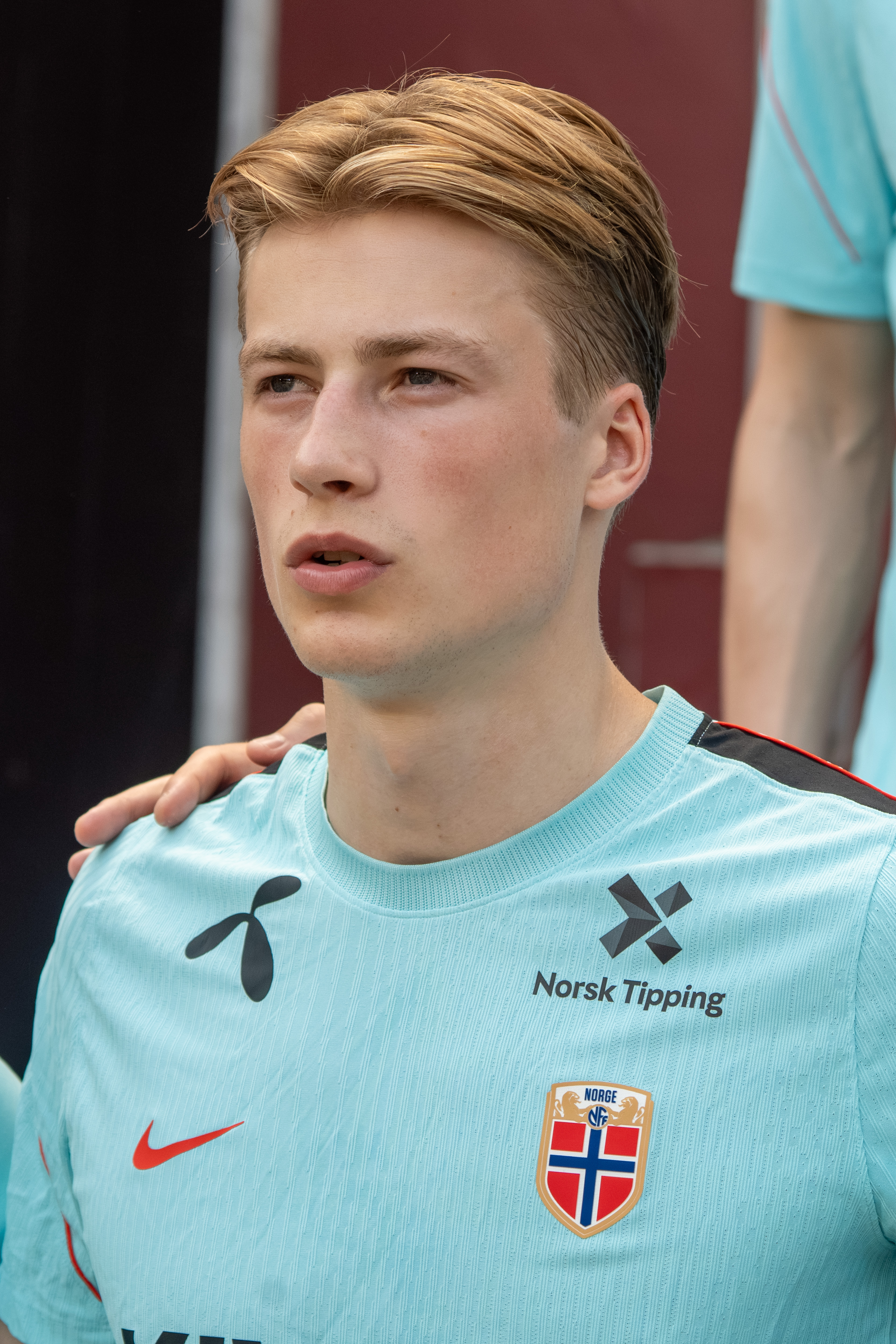
- Tangvik with Norway in 2026

Personal information
- Date of birth: 29 November 2002 (age 23)
- Place of birth: Trondheim, Norway
- Height: 1.93 m (6 ft 4 in)
- Position: Goalkeeper

Team information
- Current team: Hamburger SV
- Number: 12

Youth career
- –2017: Byåsen
- 2017–2021: Rosenborg

Senior career*
| Years | Team | Apps | (Gls) |
| 2021–2026 | Rosenborg | 69 | (0) |
| 2026– | Hamburger SV | 1 | (0) |

International career^{‡}
| 2021 | Norway U15 | 1 | (0) |
| 2022 | Norway U16 | 8 | (0) |
| 2021 | Norway U17 | 6 | (0) |
| 2022 | Norway U18 | 2 | (0) |
| 2022–2023 | Norway U20 | 4 | (0) |
| 2023–2024 | Norway U21 | 12 | (0) |
- * Club domestic league appearances and goals as of 16 May 2026 ‡ National team caps and goals as of 19 November 2024

Sander Tangvik (born 29 November 2002) is a Norwegian footballer who plays as a goalkeeper for German Bundesliga club Hamburger SV.

== Club career ==
In March 2021 Tangvik signed a new contract with Rosenborg and became a part of the first team squad. Later that year in August he made his debut against Orkla in the Norwegian Cup, coming on for the second half.

Tangvik made his league debut on 6 November 2022 coming on in the 89th minute against Jerv, replacing André Hansen.

On 22 January 2026, Tangvik signed with Hamburger SV in Germany. He made his debut in a 1–1 match against Bayer 04 Leverkusen on the last day of the 2025–26 season, where he also saved a penalty against Patrik Schick.

== International career ==
Tangvik represented the Norway under-17 national team, making a total of seven appearances between 2018 and 2019.

He made his debut for the Norway under-21 national team on 15 June 2023 in a friendly match against Scotland. He started the match, which ended in a 0–0 draw.

On 21 May 2026, Tangvik was named by Norway national team manager Ståle Solbakken in the 26-man squad for the 2026 FIFA World Cup.

== Career statistics ==
=== Club ===
As of match played 27 October 2026

Appearances and goals by club, season and competition
| Club | Season | Division | League | | Cup | | Continental | | Other | | Total | |
| Club | Season | Division | Apps | Goals | Apps | Goals | Apps | Goals | Apps | Goals | Apps | Goals |
|---|---|---|---|---|---|---|---|---|---|---|---|---|
| Rosenborg | 2021 | Eliteserien | 0 | 0 | 1 | 0 | 0 | 0 | — | | 1 | 0 |
| Rosenborg | 2022 | Eliteserien | 1 | 0 | 0 | 0 | 0 | 0 | — | | 1 | 0 |
| Rosenborg | 2023 | Eliteserien | 9 | 0 | 3 | 0 | 0 | 0 | — | | 12 | 0 |
| Rosenborg | 2024 | Eliteserien | 29 | 0 | 2 | 0 | 0 | 0 | — | | 31 | 0 |
| Rosenborg | 2025 | Eliteserien | 30 | 0 | 4 | 0 | 6 | 0 | — | | 40 | 0 |
| Rosenborg | Total | | 69 | 0 | 10 | 0 | 6 | 0 | — | | 85 | 0 |
| Hamburger SV | 2025–26 | Bundesliga | 1 | 0 | 0 | 0 | — | | — | | 1 | 0 |
| Hamburger SV | 2026–27 | Bundesliga | 0 | 0 | 2 | 0 | — | | — | | 2 | 0 |
| Hamburger SV | Total | | 1 | 0 | 2 | 0 | — | | — | | 3 | 0 |
| Career total | | | 70 | 0 | 12 | 0 | 6 | 0 | 0 | 0 | 88 | 0 |
