= Renzo Giampaoli =

Argentine footballer

Personal information
- Date of birth: 7 January 2000 (age 26)
- Place of birth: Bombal, Argentina
- Height: 1.88 m (6 ft 2 in)
- Position: Centre-back

Team information
- Current team: Gimnasia LP (on loan from Boca Juniors)
- Number: 4

Youth career
- Boca Juniors

Senior career*
Years	Team	Apps	(Gls)
2021–	Boca Juniors	2	(0)
2022	→ Rosenborg (loan)	24	(0)
2023	→ Quilmes (loan)	24	(3)
2024	→ Defensor Sporting (loan)	35	(2)
2025–	→ Gimnasia LP (loan)	41	(0)
- * Club domestic league appearances and goals as of 17:07, 9 July 2026 (UTC)

Renzo Giampaoli (born 7 January 2000) is an Argentine footballer currently playing as a centre-back for Gimnasia LP, on loan from Boca Juniors.

== Career ==
On 30 January 2022, he joined Norwegian Eliteserien club Rosenborg on loan until the end of the 2022 season.

== Career statistics ==
=== Club ===
As of 18 August 2021.

Club	Season	League			Cup		Continental		Other		Total	
Club	Season	Division	Apps	Goals	Apps	Goals	Apps	Goals	Apps	Goals	Apps	Goals
Boca Juniors	2021	Argentine Primera División	2	0	0	0	0	0	0	0	2	0
Rosenborg	2022	Eliteserien	26	0	2	0	0	0	0	0	28	0
Rosenborg	Total		28	0	2	0	0	0	0	0	30	0
Career total			28	0	2	0	0	0	0	0	30	0
