= Adam Andersson =

Swedish footballer

Personal information
- Full name: Carl Adam Andersson
- Date of birth: 11 November 1996 (age 30)
- Place of birth: Gothenburg, Sweden
- Height: 1.78 m (5 ft 10 in)
- Position: Left-back

Team information
- Current team: Örgryte IS
- Number: 18

Youth career
- –2012: Västra Frölunda
- 2013–2014: BK Häcken

Senior career*
Years	Team	Apps	(Gls)
2012	Västra Frölunda	9	(0)
2015–2020	BK Häcken	106	(5)
2021–2024	Rosenborg	51	(0)
2022–2023	→ Randers (loan)	26	(1)
2025	Lyngby	10	(0)
2025–2026	AaB	15	(0)
2026–	Örgryte IS	7	(1)

International career
2015	Sweden U19	1	(0)
2019–2020	Sweden	4	(0)
- * Club domestic league appearances and goals as of 7 September 2026

Carl Adam Andersson (born 11 November 1996) is a Swedish footballer who plays as a left-back for Allsvenskan club Örgryte IS. He is the twin brother of Joel Andersson who plays for PFC Ludogorets Razgrad.

== Career ==
On 3 February 2025, it was confirmed that Andersson would return to Denmark as he signed for Superliga club Lyngby Boldklub on an agreement lasting until June 2025. He left the club at the end of the contract.

On 22 June 2026, Andersson signed a two-and-a-half-year contract with Örgryte IS.

== International ==
Adam Andersson made his debut for the Sweden men's national football team on 8 January 2019 in a friendly against Finland, as a 64th-minute substitute for Jonathan Augustinsson.

== Career statistics ==
=== Club ===
As of match played 10 November 2024

Appearances and goals by club, season and competition
Club	Season	League			National Cup		Europe		Total	
Club	Season	Division	Apps	Goals	Apps	Goals	Apps	Goals	Apps	Goals
Västra Frölunda	2012	Division 2	9	0	0	0	-		9	0
Västra Frölunda	Total		9	0	0	0	-	-	9	0
Häcken	2015	Allsvenskan	7	0	3	0	-		10	0
Häcken	2016	Allsvenskan	16	1	2	2	-		18	3
Häcken	2017	Allsvenskan	8	1	4	2	-		12	3
Häcken	2018	Allsvenskan	23	0	7	1	4	0	34	1
Häcken	2019	Allsvenskan	28	2	4	0	2	0	34	2
Häcken	2020	Allsvenskan	24	1	1	0	-		25	1
Häcken	Total		106	5	20	5	6	0	132	10
Rosenborg	2021	Eliteserien	28	0	3	0	6	1	37	1
Rosenborg	2022	Eliteserien	5	0	1	0	0	0	6	0
Rosenborg	2023	Eliteserien	11	0	0	0	2	0	13	0
Rosenborg	2024	Eliteserien	7	0	1	0	0	0	8	0
Rosenborg	Total		51	0	5	0	8	1	64	1
Randers (loan)	2022–23	Danish Superliga	26	1	2	1	0	0	28	2
Randers (loan)	Total		26	1	2	1	0	0	28	2
Career total			192	6	27	6	14	1	233	13
