= Kristall Máni Ingason =

Icelandic footballer (born 2002)

Personal information
- Full name: Kristall Máni Ingason
- Date of birth: 18 January 2002 (age 24)
- Place of birth: Iceland
- Height: 1.78 m (5 ft 10 in)
- Positions: Forward; winger

Team information
- Current team: Brann
- Number: 10

Youth career
- –2017: Fjölnir
- 2018–2020: Copenhagen

Senior career*
Years	Team	Apps	(Gls)
2020	Copenhagen	0	(0)
2020	→ Víkingur Reykjavík (loan)	15	(1)
2021–2022	Víkingur Reykjavík	32	(7)
2022–2023	Rosenborg	16	(3)
2023–2026	SønderjyskE	62	(15)
2026–	Brann	22	(9)

International career^{‡}
2017–2018	Iceland U16	11	(2)
2017–2019	Iceland U17	14	(0)
2019	Iceland U19	5	(2)
2021–2024	Iceland U21	19	(11)
2022–	Iceland	11	(0)
- * Club domestic league appearances and goals as of 22 November 2026 ‡ National team caps and goals as of 13 November 2026

Kristall Máni Ingason (born 18 January 2002) is an Icelandic professional footballer who plays as a forward or winger for Eliteserien club Brann and the Iceland national team.

== Club career ==
Kristall Máni started his senior career when he joined Víkingur Reykjavík on loan from FC Copenhagen before the 2020 season in Iceland. He then returned to Víkingur before the 2021 season in Iceland. He joined Rosenborg on August 1, 2022.

On 19 July 2023, Ingason joined Danish 1st Division club SønderjyskE on a deal until June 2026.

On 26 January 2026, Ingason joined Norwegian Eliteserien side Brann on contract until end of 2029.

== International career ==
Kristall Máni made his debut with the national team in the friendly match against Uganda on 12 January 2022, coming on as a second-half substitute.

== Career statistics ==
=== Club ===
As of 22 November 2026

Appearances and goals by club, season and competition
Club	Season	League			National Cup		League Cup		Europe		Total	
Club	Season	Division	Apps	Goals	Apps	Goals	Apps	Goals	Apps	Goals	Apps	Goals
Víkingur Reykjavík	2020	Úrvalsdeild	15	1	2	0	0	0	―		17	1
Víkingur Reykjavík	2021	Úrvalsdeild	21	3	5	3	6	5	―		32	11
Víkingur Reykjavík	2022	Úrvalsdeild	11	4	2	2	7	1	5 (Note: Three appearances and three goals in UEFA Champions League, two appearances in UEFA Conference League)	3	25	10
Víkingur Reykjavík	Total		47	8	9	5	13	6	5	3	74	22
Rosenborg	2022	Eliteserien	8	2	0	0	0	0	―		8	2
Rosenborg	2023	Eliteserien	8	1	2	0	0	0	―		10	1
Rosenborg	Total		16	3	2	0	0	0	0	0	18	3
SønderjyskE	2023–24	Danish 1st Division	28	8	2	0	―		―		30	8
SønderjyskE	2024–25	Superliga	20	1	1	1	―		―		21	2
SønderjyskE	2025–26	Superliga	14	6	2	2	―		―		16	8
SønderjyskE	Total		62	15	5	3	—		—		67	18
Brann	2026	Eliteserien	22	9	5	3	—		10 (Note: Two appearances in UEFA Europa League, eight appearances and two goals in UEFA Conference League)	2	37	14
Career total			147	35	21	11	15	6	13	5	195	57

=== International ===
As of match played 13 November 2026

Appearances and goals by national team and year
National team	Year	Apps	Goals
Iceland	2022	2	0
Iceland	2023	2	0
Iceland	2024	2	0
Iceland	2025	0	0
Iceland	2026	5	0
Total		11	0

== Honours ==
Víkingur Reykjavík

- Úrvalsdeild: 2021
- Icelandic Cup: 2021
