= Rasmus Wiedesheim-Paul =

Swedish footballer (born 1999)

Personal information
- Full name: Håkan Rasmus Wiedesheim-Paul
- Date of birth: 8 February 1999 (age 27)
- Place of birth: Halmstad, Sweden
- Height: 1.87 m (6 ft 2 in)
- Position: Forward

Team information
- Current team: Örebro
- Number: 10

Youth career
- –2013: BK Astrio
- 2013–2016: Halmstad

Senior career*
Years	Team	Apps	(Gls)
2016–2020	Halmstad	50	(32)
2017	→ Landskrona BoIS (loan)	0	(0)
2018	→ IFK Värnamo (loan)	14	(2)
2020–2024	Rosenborg	31	(7)
2022	→ Mjällby (loan)	13	(0)
2022	→ Helsingborg (loan)	13	(1)
2023	→ HamKam (loan)	9	(1)
2024–2026	Halmstad	18	(1)
2025	→ Oddevold (loan)	30	(13)
2026	Roda JC Kerkrade	7	(1)
2026–	Örebro	16	(4)

International career
2019	Sweden U19	2	(0)
- * Club domestic league appearances and goals as of 12 November 2026

Rasmus Wiedesheim-Paul (born 8 February 1999) is a Swedish professional footballer who plays as a forward for Örebro.

== Career ==
Rasmus Wiedesheim-Paul joined Halmstad in 2013 as a 14 year old. He made his debut in July 2016 in a Superettan match against AFC Eskilstuna. In 2017, he was loaned out to Landskrona BoIS for four months. The following year, he was loaned out to IFK Värnamo for the second half of the seasons. In 2019, he became a regular for Halmstad and finished second on the top scorer list in 2019 Superettan with 18 goals. The following year, he signed for Rosenborg after scoring 13 goals in 18 matches in 2020 Superettan.

On 3 February 2026, Wiedesheim-Paul signed with Roda JC Kerkrade in the Netherlands.

On 7 July 2026, he joined Swedish side Örebro SK on a one-and-a-half year contract.

== Personal life ==
He is the son of former Halmstad goalkeeper Håkan Svensson.

== Career statistics ==
As of match played 22 July 2026

Appearances and goals by club, season and competition
Club	Season	League			National cup (Note: Includes Svenska Cupen, Norwegian Cup)		Europe		Other		Total	
Club	Season	Division	Apps	Goals	Apps	Goals	Apps	Goals	Apps	Goals	Apps	Goals
Halmstad	2016	Superettan	1	0	0	0	—		0	0	1	0
Halmstad	2017	Allsvenskan	2	0	1	0	—		0	0	3	0
Halmstad	2018	Superettan	0	0	0	0	—		0	0	0	0
Halmstad	2019	Superettan	29	19	1	0	—		0	0	30	19
Halmstad	2020	Superettan	18	13	3	1	—		0	0	21	14
Halmstad	Total		50	32	5	1	0	0	0	0	55	33
Landskrona BoIS (loan)	2017	Division 1	0	0	2	0	—		0	0	2	0
IFK Värnamo (loan)	2018	Superettan	14	2	0	0	—		0	0	14	2
Rosenborg	2020	Eliteserien	4	0	—		—		0	0	4	0
Rosenborg	2021	Eliteserien	18	4	1	2	1 (Note: Appearance(s) in UEFA Europa Conference League)	0	0	0	20	6
Rosenborg	2023	Eliteserien	9	3	1	0	2	0	0	0	12	3
Rosenborg	Total		31	7	2	2	3	0	0	0	36	9
Mjällby (loan)	2022	Allsvenskan	13	0	0	0	—		0	0	13	0
Helsingborg (loan)	2022	Allsvenskan	13	1	1	0	—		0	0	14	1
HamKam (loan)	2023	Eliteserien	9	1	4	5	—		0	0	13	6
Halmstad	2024	Allsvenskan	18	1	5	1	—		0	0	23	2
Oddevold (loan)	2025	Superettan	30	13	3	1	—		0	0	33	14
Roda	2025–26	Eerste Divisie	7	1	0	0	—		0	0	7	1
Örebro	2026	Superettan	1	0	0	0	—		0	0	1	0
Career total			186	58	22	10	3	0	0	0	211	68
