= Stefano Vecchia =

Swedish footballer

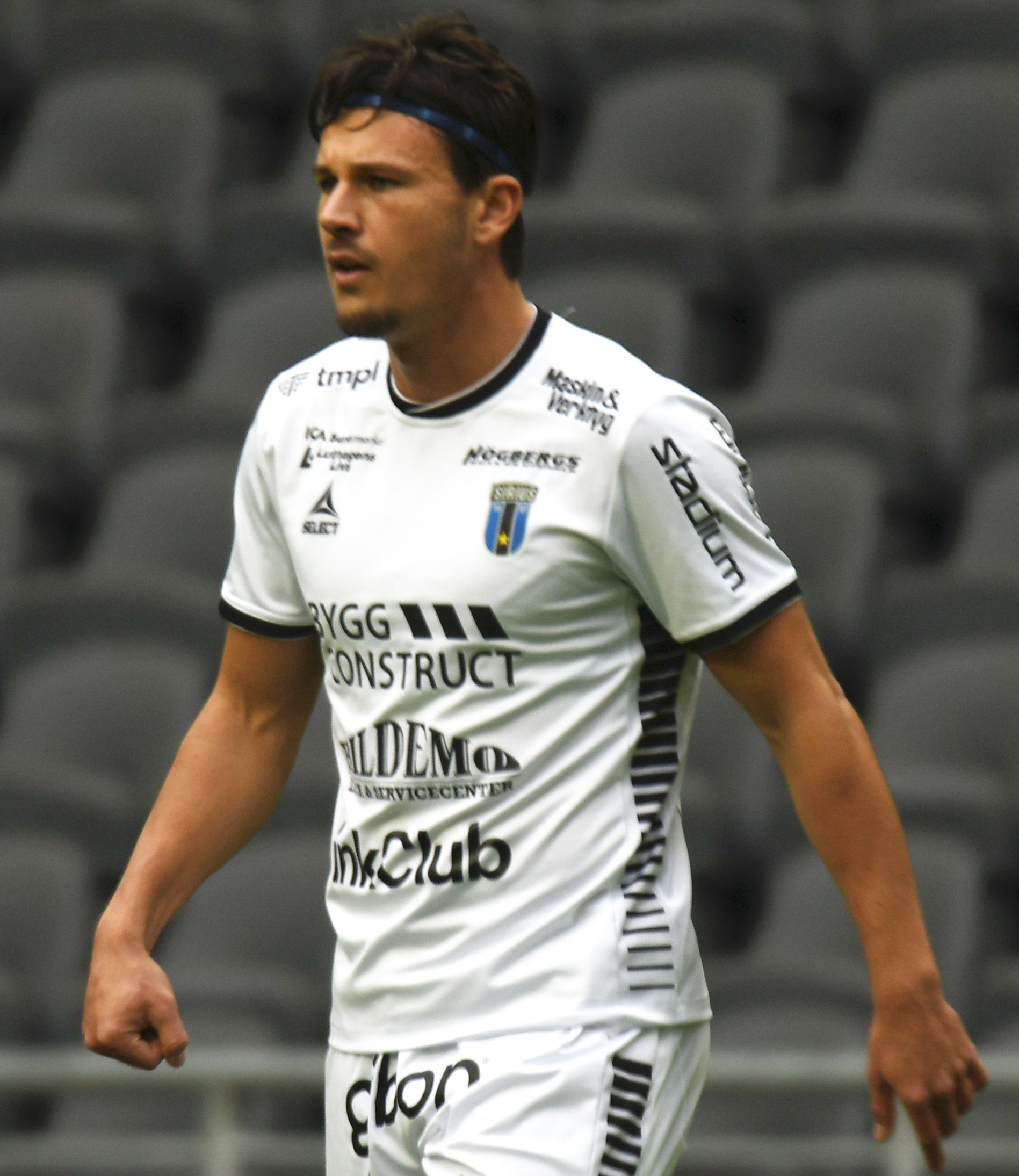

Personal information
- Full name: Stefano Giuseppe Arne; Vecchia Holmquist
- Date of birth: 23 January 1995 (age 31)
- Place of birth: Solna, Sweden
- Height: 1.82 m (6 ft 0 in)
- Position: Forward

Team information
- Current team: Aalesund
- Number: 23

Youth career
- –2002: Vasalund
- 2002–2013: Brommapojkarna

Senior career*
Years	Team	Apps	(Gls)
2013–2016	Brommapojkarna	48	(17)
2017–2020	Sirius	70	(17)
2021–2022	Rosenborg	33	(20)
2023–2026	Malmö FF	34	(9)
2026–	Aalesund	1	(0)
- * Club domestic league appearances and goals as of 16 September 2026

Stefano Giuseppe Arne Vecchia Holmquist (born 23 January 1995) is a Swedish professional footballer who plays as a second striker or left-winger for Aalesund.

== Personal life ==
Vecchia was born in Sweden to an Italian father and Swedish mother, and holds dual-citizenship.

== Career statistics ==
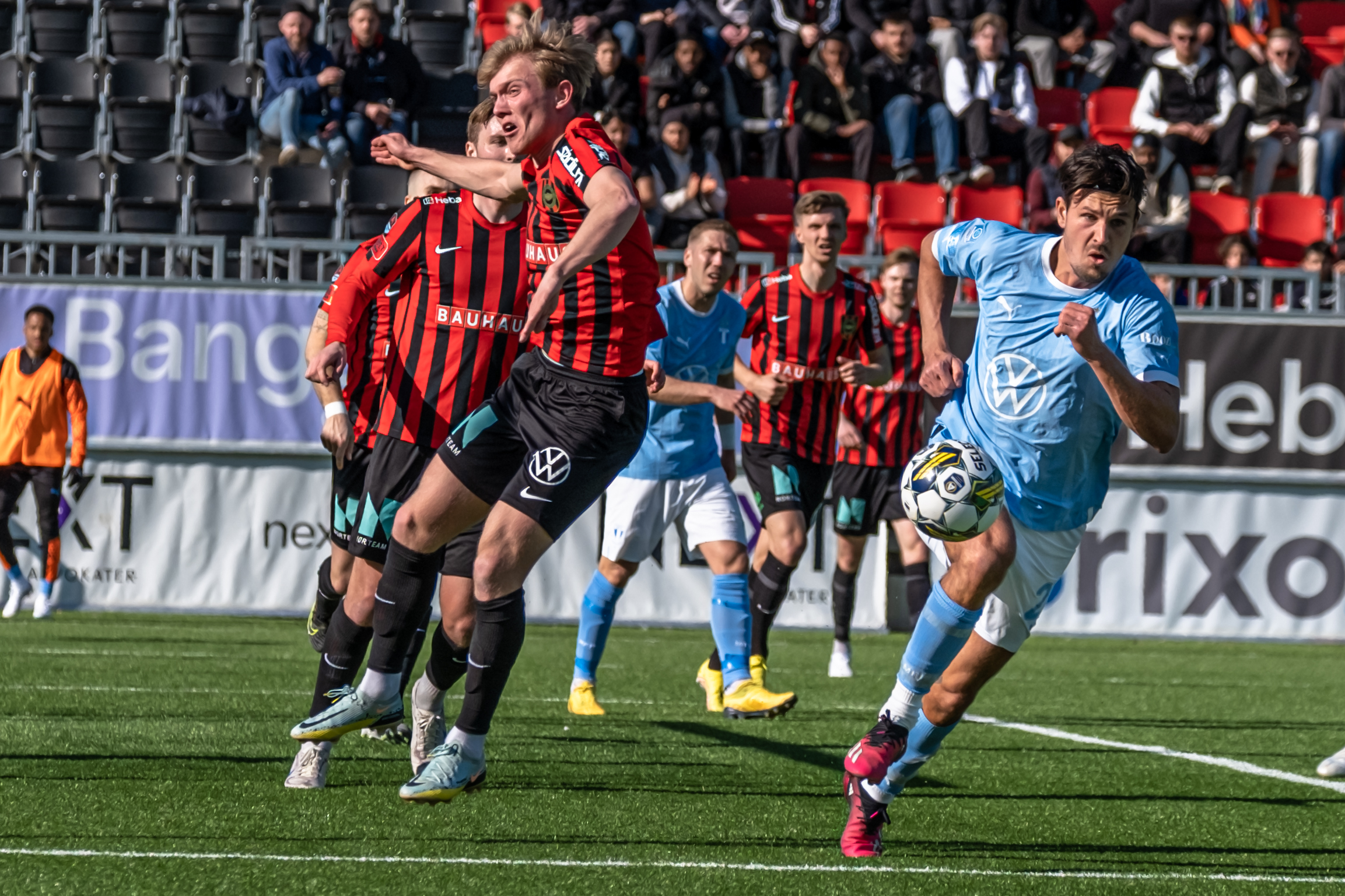
Vecchia playing for Malmö FF in 2023

=== Club ===
As of match played 16 September 2026

Appearances and goals by club, season and competition
Club	Season	League			National Cup		Continental		Total	
Club	Season	Division	Apps	Goals	Apps	Goals	Apps	Goals	Apps	Goals
Brommapojkarna	2013	Allsvenskan	3	0	—		—		3	0
Brommapojkarna	2014	Allsvenskan	5	0	3	0	—		8	0
Brommapojkarna	2015	Superettan	20	6	—		—		20	6
Brommapojkarna	2016	Division 1 Norra	20	11	1	1	—		21	12
Brommapojkarna	Total		48	17	4	1	—		52	18
Sirius	2017	Allsvenskan	17	4	2	2	—		19	6
Sirius	2018	Allsvenskan	18	1	4	3	—		22	4
Sirius	2019	Allsvenskan	9	0	3	2	—		12	2
Sirius	2020	Allsvenskan	26	12	—		—		26	12
Sirius	Total		70	17	9	7	—		79	24
Rosenborg	2021	Eliteserien	17	11	0	0	5	3	22	14
Rosenborg	2022	Eliteserien	16	9	2	0	—		18	9
Rosenborg	Total		33	20	2	0	5	3	40	23
Malmö FF	2023	Allsvenskan	23	8	0	0	—		23	8
Malmö FF	2024	Allsvenskan	2	1	3	1	—		5	2
Malmö FF	2025	Allsvenskan	7	0	1	0	3	0	11	0
Malmö FF	2026	Allsvenskan	2	0	0	0	—		2	0
Malmö FF	Total		34	9	4	1	3	0	41	10
Aalesund	2026	Eliteserien	1	0	1	0	0	0	2	0
Career total			186	63	20	9	8	3	214	75

== Honours ==
Malmö FF

- Allsvenskan: 2023, 2024

Individual

- Eliteserien Player of the Month: September 2021
