= 2025 Rosenborg BK season =

Rosenborg 2025 football season

Rosenborg
2025 season
- Chairman: Cecilie Gotaas Johnsen
- Coach: Alfred Johansson
- Stadium: Lerkendal Stadion
- Eliteserien: 7th
- Norwegian Cup 2025: Quarter-finals
- Norwegian Cup 2025–26: Fourth round
- 2025–26 UEFA Europa Conference League: Play-off round vs Mainz 05
- Top goalscorer: League: Dino Islamović (14 goals); All: Dino Islamović (24 goals)
- Highest home attendance: 21,263 vs Molde (27 April)
- Lowest home attendance: 9,218 vs Sandefjord (29 October)
- Average home league attendance: 14,443 (30 November)
| Home colours | Away colours |

The 2025 season is Rosenborg's 46th consecutive year in the top flight now known as Eliteserien, their 57th season in the top flight of Norwegian football. In addition to the Eliteserien, the club is participating in the Norwegian Cup and will participate in the 2025–26 UEFA Europa Conference League entering at the second qualifying round. This is Alfred Johansson's second season in charge of Rosenborg.

== Squad ==
Note: Flags indicate national team as defined under FIFA eligibility rules; some limited exceptions apply. Players may hold more than one non-FIFA nationality.

| No. | Pos. | Nation | Player |
|---|---|---|---|
| 1 | GK | NOR | Sander Tangvik |
| 2 | DF | NOR | Erlend Dahl Reitan |
| 5 | DF | PLE | Moustafa Zeidan |
| 6 | MF | FIN | Santeri Väänänen |
| 7 | MF | NOR | Simen Bolkan Nordli |
| 8 | MF | NOR | Iver Fossum |
| 9 | FW | NOR | Ole Sæter |
| 10 | MF | NOR | Ole Selnæs (captain) |
| 11 | FW | DEN | Noah Sahsah |
| 12 | GK | NOR | Rasmus Sandberg |
| 15 | DF | DEN | Jonas Mortensen |

| No. | Pos. | Nation | Player |
|---|---|---|---|
| 16 | DF | NOR | Aslak Fonn Witry |
| 19 | DF | NOR | Adrian Pereira |
| 21 | DF | SVK | Tomáš Nemčík |
| 23 | DF | NOR | Ulrik Yttergård Jenssen |
| 29 | FW | SVK | Dávid Ďuriš |
| 33 | MF | NOR | Tobias Dahl |
| 35 | FW | NOR | Emil Ceïde |
| 38 | DF | NOR | Mikkel Ceïde |
| 39 | FW | MNE | Dino Islamović |
| 45 | DF | NOR | Jesper Reitan-Sunde |
| 50 | DF | NOR | Håkon Volden |

== Transfers ==
=== Winter ===
In: Note: Flags indicate national team as defined under FIFA eligibility rules; some limited exceptions apply. Players may hold more than one non-FIFA nationality.

| No. | Pos. | Nation | Player |
|---|---|---|---|
| 8 | MF | NOR | Iver Fossum (from (Belgium) Kortrijk) |
| 11 | FW | DEN | Noah Sahsah (from (Denmark) FC Copenhagen, previously on loan) |
| 15 | DF | DEN | Jonas Mortensen (from (Denmark) Esbjerg) |
| 17 | FW | ISL | Ísak Þorvaldsson (loan return from (Iceland) Breiðablik) |
| 22 | MF | SWE | Henry Sletsjøe (from (Sweden) Brage) |
| 39 | FW | MNE | Dino Islamović (from (Sweden) Kalmar) |

Out: Note: Flags indicate national team as defined under FIFA eligibility rules; some limited exceptions apply. Players may hold more than one non-FIFA nationality.

| No. | Pos. | Nation | Player |
|---|---|---|---|
| 3 | DF | SWE | Jonathan Augustinsson (released) |
| 7 | MF | NOR | Markus Henriksen (Retired) |
| 11 | FW | CAN | Jayden Nelson (to (Canada) Vancouver Whitecaps) |
| 20 | MF | NOR | Edvard Tagseth (to (United States) Nashville) |
| 25 | DF | SWE | Adam Andersson (released, to (Denmark) Lyngby) |
| 29 | FW | NOR | Oscar Aga (on loan to (Sweden) Helsingborg, previously on loan at (Norway) Fredrikstad) |
| 33 | DF | NOR | Tobias Dahl (on loan to (Norway) Moss) |
| 40 | FW | NOR | Pawel Chrupalla (released, to (Sweden) Halmstad, previously on loan at (Norway) Sarpsborg 08) |
| 44 | FW | NOR | Magnus Holte (on loan to (Norway) Hødd) |

=== Summer ===
In: Note: Flags indicate national team as defined under FIFA eligibility rules; some limited exceptions apply. Players may hold more than one non-FIFA nationality.

| No. | Pos. | Nation | Player |
|---|---|---|---|
| 7 | MF | NOR | Simen Bolkan Nordli (from (Denmark) Randers) |
| 16 | DF | NOR | Aslak Fonn Witry (from (Bulgaria) Ludogorets Razgrad) |
| 29 | FW | SVK | Dávid Ďuriš (from (Slovakia) Žilina) |
| 33 | DF | NOR | Tobias Dahl (loan return from (Norway) Moss) |
| 35 | FW | NOR | Emil Ceïde (from (Italy) Sassuolo, previously on loan) |

Out: Note: Flags indicate national team as defined under FIFA eligibility rules; some limited exceptions apply. Players may hold more than one non-FIFA nationality.

| No. | Pos. | Nation | Player |
|---|---|---|---|
| 4 | DF | DEN | Luka Racic (on loan to (Denmark) Lyngby) |
| 7 | FW | NOR | Marius Sivertsen Broholm (to (France) Lille) |
| 14 | FW | DEN | Emil Frederiksen (to (Croatia) Istra 1961) |
| 17 | FW | ISL | Ísak Þorvaldsson (on loan to (Denmark) Lyngby) |
| 18 | FW | NOR | Noah Holm (to (Norway) Brann) |
| 22 | MF | SWE | Henry Sletsjøe (on loan to (Norway) Kristiansund) |
| 41 | MF | NOR | Sverre Nypan (to (England) Manchester City) |

== Friendlies ==
| 30 January 2025 | IFK Göteborg (Sweden) | 1–0 | (Norway) Rosenborg | Algarve, Portugal |
| 20:00 CET (UTC+1) | Markovic 41' | Summary | | Stadium: Estádio Algarve |

| 7 February 2025 | Brøndby (Denmark) | 3–2 | (Norway) Rosenborg | Algarve, Portugal |
| 17:00 CET (UTC+1) | Suzuki 39'; Nartey 53'; Wass 76' | Summary | Þorvaldsson 78'; Islamović 90' | Stadium: Estádio Algarve |

| 10 February 2025 | Värnamo (Sweden) | 0–0 | (Norway) Rosenborg | Algarve, Portugal |
| 17:00 CET (UTC+1) | | | | Stadium: Estádio Algarve |

| 22 February 2025 | Ranheim | 1–2 | Rosenborg | Frøya |
| 16:00 CET (UTC+1) | Mogensen 90+1' (pen.) | Summary | Reitan-Sunde 39'; Zeidan 70' | Stadium: Frøya Storhall |

| 2 March 2025 | Skeid | 0–0 | Rosenborg | Marbella, Spain |
| 16:30 CET (UTC+1) | | Summary | | Stadium: Banús Football Center |

| 6 March 2025 | FH (Iceland) | 1–3 | (Norway) Rosenborg | Marbella, Spain |
| 16:30 CET (UTC+1) | Bjarkason 84' | Summary | Islamović 45'; Väänänen 79'; Ceïde 89' | Stadium: Banús Football Center |

| 16 March 2025 | Viking | 3–2 | Rosenborg | Stavanger |
| 17:00 CET (UTC+1) | D'Agostino 21', 51'; Heggheim 58' | Summary | Islamović 39'; D'Agostino 56' (o.g.) | Stadium: Viking Stadion |

| 22 March 2025 | Rosenborg (Norway) | 2–0 | (Sweden) AIK | Trondheim |
| 11:30 CET (UTC+1) | Islamović 56'; Sæter 78' | Summary | | Stadium: Koteng Arena |

== Competitions ==
=== Eliteserien ===
==== Results summary ====
| Overall | | | | | | | | Home | | | | | | Away | | | | | |
| Pld | W | D | L | GF | GA | GD | Pts | W | D | L | GF | GA | GD | W | D | L | GF | GA | GD |
|---|---|---|---|---|---|---|---|---|---|---|---|---|---|---|---|---|---|---|---|
| 30 | 11 | 9 | 10 | 44 | 42 | +2 | 42 | 7 | 6 | 2 | 26 | 12 | +14 | 4 | 3 | 8 | 18 | 30 | −12 |

Last updated: 30 November 2025.
Source: see below

==== Results by round ====
| Round | 1 | 2 | 3 | 4 | 5 | 6 | 7 | 8 | 9 | 10 | 11 | 12 | 13 | 14 | 15 | 16 | 17 | 18 | 19 | 20 | 21 | 22 | 23 | 24 | 25 | 26 | 27 | 28 | 29 | 30 |
|---|---|---|---|---|---|---|---|---|---|---|---|---|---|---|---|---|---|---|---|---|---|---|---|---|---|---|---|---|---|---|
| Ground | B | H | B | H | H | B | H | B | H | B | H | B | H | B | H | B | H | B | H | B | B | H | B | H | B | H | B | H | B | H |
| Result | W | W | W | D | W | D | W | L | D | L | D | L | W | D | W | L | D | W | D | L | W | D | L | L | D | L | L | W | L | W |
| Position | 5 | 2 | 1 | 2 | 2 | 2 | 1 | 4 | 4 | 6 | 5 | 7 | 5 | 6 | 6 | 6 | 6 | 5 | 5 | 5 | 5 | 5 | 5 | 6 | 6 | 8 | 8 | 8 | 9 | 7 |

Updated to match(es) played on 30 November 2025. Source: see below
A = Away; H = Home; W = Win; D = Draw; L = Loss

==== Results ====
| 29 March 2025 1 | Strømsgodset | 1–2 | Rosenborg | Drammen |
| 16:00 CEST (UTC+2) | Tómasson (yellow card) 51'; Ardraa 90' (yellow card) 79'; Gustav Valsvik (yellow card) 90+6'; Farji (yellow card) 90+10'; Therkelsen (yellow card) 90+10' | Summary | Islamović (yellow card) 28'; Fossum 39'; Yttergård Jenssen (yellow card) 42'; E Ceïde 49'; Broholm (yellow card) 68'; Sæter (yellow card) 90+2'; M Ceïde (yellow card) 90+10'; Dahl Reitan (yellow card) 90+10' | Stadium: Marienlyst Stadion; Attendance: 8,332; Referee: Marius Hansen Grøtta |

| 5 April 2025 2 | Rosenborg | 1–0 | Fredrikstad | Trondheim |
| 18:00 CEST (UTC+2) | Nypan 39'; E Ceïde (yellow card) 90+8' | Summary | Skogvold (penalty missed) 58'; Fall (yellow card) 90+4' | Stadium: Lerkendal Stadion; Attendance: 16,325; Referee: Rohit Saggi |

| 21 April 2025 3 | Vålerenga | 0–2 | Rosenborg | Oslo |
| 14:30 CEST (UTC+2) | Ambina (yellow card) 37' | Summary | Broholm 2' (yellow card) 88'; E Ceïde 65'; Pereira (yellow card) 70' | Stadium: Intility Arena; Attendance: 16,556; Referee: Sigurd Kringstad |

| 27 April 2025 4 | Rosenborg | 0–0 | Molde | Trondheim |
| 14:30 CEST (UTC+2) | Zeidan (yellow card) 89' | Summary | Linnes (yellow card) 74'; Stenevik (yellow card) 81' | Stadium: Lerkendal Stadion; Referee: Espen Eskås |

| 4 May 2025 5 | Rosenborg | 3–0 | Bryne | Trondheim |
| 19:15 CEST (UTC+2) | Broholm 9', 63'; Pereira (yellow card) 66'; Yttergård Jenssen 77'; Holm (yellow card) 88' | Summary | | Stadium: Lerkendal Stadion; Attendance: 11,166; Referee: Sivert Amland |

| 11 May 2025 6 | Brann | 0–0 | Rosenborg | Bergen |
| 14:30 CEST (UTC+2) | Soltvedt (yellow card) 88'; Sery Larsen (yellow card) 89' | Summary | Broholm (yellow card) 33'; Sæter (yellow card) 89' | Stadium: Brann Stadion; Attendance: 17,500; Referee: Marius Hansen Grøtta |

| 16 May 2025 7 | Rosenborg | 1–0 | Haugesund | Trondheim |
| 18:00 CEST (UTC+2) | Zeidan 23'; Selnæs (yellow card) 49'; M Ceïde (yellow card) 70' | Summary | Eskesen (yellow card) 60'; Dia (yellow card) 79' | Stadium: Lerkendal Stadion; Attendance: 21,243; Referee: Ola Hobber Nilsen |

| 25 May 2025 8 | Bodø/Glimt | 4–0 | Rosenborg | Bodø |
| 18:00 CEST (UTC+2) | Høgh 4'; Berg (yellow card) 9'; Blomberg 18', 39'; Saltnes 52'; Sjøvold (yellow card) 57' | Summary | E Ceïde (yellow card) 70' | Stadium: Aspmyra Stadion; Attendance: 8,107; Referee: Tore Hansen |

| 1 June 2025 9 | Rosenborg | 1–1 | KFUM | Trondheim |
| 17:00 CEST (UTC+2) | M Ceïde (yellow card) 46'; Yttergård Jenssen (yellow card) 69'; Broholm 74' (pen.) | Summary | Aleesami (yellow card) 22'; Sandal (yellow card) 76'; Ndiaye 83' | Stadium: Lerkendal Stadion; Attendance: 12,311; Referee: Svein Tore Sinnes |

| 22 June 2025 10 | Kristiansund | 4–1 | Rosenborg | Kristiansund |
| 17:00 CEST (UTC+2) | Olsen (yellow card) 13'; Kilen 21', 33'; Alte 35'; Tufekcic (yellow card) 77'; Haugen 84'; Ndour (yellow card) 88' | Summary | E Ceïde 45+3'; Yttergård Jenssen (yellow card) 54'; Holm (yellow card) 90+3' | Stadium: Kristiansund Stadion; Attendance: 4,364; Referee: Marius Waskaas Lien |

| 28 June 2025 11 | Rosenborg | 1–1 | Viking | Trondheim |
| 18:00 CEST (UTC+2) | Väänänen (yellow card) 38'; Sletsjøe (yellow card) 54'; Islamović 70' | Summary | Olsen (yellow card) 25'; Segadal Hansen 29' (yellow card) 50'; Mikaelsson (yellow card) 55' | Stadium: Lerkendal Stadion; Attendance: 13,663; Referee: Rohit Saggi |

| 6 July 2025 12 | Sandefjord | 2–0 | Rosenborg | Sandefjord |
| 14:30 CEST (UTC+2) | Patoulidis (yellow card) 18'; Dunsby 27'; Risan Mørk 39'; Melchior (yellow card) 90+3' | Summary | M Ceïde (yellow card) 68'; Yttergård Jenssen (yellow card) 90+4'; Selnæs (yellow card) 90+5' | Stadium: Jotun Arena; Attendance: 6,598; Referee: Christian Moen |

| 13 July 2025 13 | Rosenborg | 2–0 | HamKam | Trondheim |
| 17:00 CEST (UTC+2) | Nemčík 15'; Islamović 45+8' (pen.) | Summary | Sørås (yellow card) 56'; Mares (yellow card) 90+2' | Stadium: Lerkendal Stadion; Attendance: 12,210; Referee: Sigurd Kringstad |

| 18 July 2025 14 | Sarpsborg 08 | 2–2 | Rosenborg | Sarpsborg |
| 18:00 CEST (UTC+2) | Karlsbakk 20' (pen.); Ndiaye (yellow card) 45'; Ørjasæter (yellow card) 51'; Berget 87' | Summary | Islamović 5'; Väänänen (yellow card) 10'; Fonn Witry 34' (yellow card) 77'; Nemčík (yellow card) 56'; Sæter (yellow card) 85'; Sletsjøe (yellow card) 90+2' | Stadium: Sarpsborg Stadion; Attendance: 6,005; Referee: Tore Hansen |

| 27 July 2025 15 | Rosenborg | 4–1 | Tromsø | Trondheim |
| 14:30 CEST (UTC+2) | Bolkan Nordli (yellow card) 8'; Islamović 29' 38' (pen.) 54' 90+2'; Yttergård Jenssen (yellow card) 84' | Summary | Kinteh (yellow card) 20'; Edvardsson (yellow card) 71'; Åsen Larsen (yellow card) 76'; Vådebu (red card) 90+2' | Stadium: Lerkendal Stadion; Attendance: 14,422; Referee: Marius Waskaas Lien |

| 3 August 2025 16 | KFUM | 4–1 | Rosenborg | Oslo |
| 17:00 CEST (UTC+2) | Hickson 16'; Sinyan (yellow card) 34'; Okeke 73', 76'; Volden 90' (o.g.) | Summary | Islamović 53' (pen.); Bolkan Nordli (yellow card) 80' | Stadium: KFUM-Arena; Attendance: 3,300; Referee: Daniel Higraff |

| 1 May 2025 17 | Rosenborg | 1–1 | Kristiansund | Trondheim |
| 18:00 CEST (UTC+2) | Holm 61' | Summary | Olsen (red card) 7'; Tufekcic (yellow card) 54'; George Igor (yellow card) 85'; Ndour 90+9' (pen.) | Stadium: Lerkendal Stadion; Attendance: 14,112; Referee: Mohammad Usman Aslam |

| 28 May 2025 18 | Fredrikstad | 0–2 | Rosenborg | Fredrikstad |
| 19:00 CEST (UTC+2) | | Summary | Sæter 24'; Þorvaldsson (yellow card) 85'; Broholm 90+3'; Selnæs (yellow card) 90+5' | Stadium: Fredrikstad Stadion; Attendance: 9,528; Referee: Espen Eskås |

| 29 October 2025 19 | Rosenborg | 1–1 | Sandefjord | Trondheim |
| 18:00 CEST (UTC+2) | E Ceïde 62'; Dahl Reitan (yellow card) 90+4' | Summary | Dunsby (yellow card) 60'; Smajlović (yellow card) 90+5'; Berntsen 90+8' | Stadium: Lerkendal Stadion; Attendance: 9,218; Referee: Daniel Higraff |

| 31 August 2025 20 | Viking | 2–1 | Rosenborg | Stavanger |
| 17:00 CEST (UTC+2) | Falchener (yellow card) 31'; Berisha 39' (.pen) 57' (yellow card) 39'; Heggheim (yellow card) 90+4' | Summary | Yttergård Jenssen (yellow card) 10'; Pereira (yellow card) 61'; E Ceïde (yellow card) 77'; Väänänen 86'; Fonn Witry (yellow card) 88' | Stadium: Viking Stadion; Attendance: 14,859; Referee: Kristoffer Hagenes |

| 14 September 2025 21 | Haugesund | 0–3 | Rosenborg | Haugesund |
| 19:15 CEST (UTC+2) | Hämäläinen (yellow card) 83' | Summary | Fossum 4'; Islamović 35' (yellow card) 84'; Yttergård Jenssen 59'; Zeidan (yellow card) 87' | Stadium: Haugesund Stadion; Attendance: 3,410; Referee: Stian Røvig Sletner |

| 21 September 2025 22 | Rosenborg | 1–1 | Bodø/Glimt | Trondheim |
| 14:30 CEST (UTC+2) | Väänänen (yellow card) 67'; Aleesami 70' (o.g.); Sæter (yellow card) 79'; Selnæs (yellow card) 90+1' | Summary | Hauge 6'; Määttä (yellow card) 90+1' | Stadium: Lerkendal Stadion; Attendance: 21,078; Referee: Espen Eskås |

| 28 September 2025 23 | HamKam | 4–0 | Rosenborg | Hamar |
| 17:00 CEST (UTC+2) | Lien 5'; Ibrahimaj 33' (yellow card) 51'; Ekeroth 45+1'; Dahl Reitan 74' (o.g.) | Summary | M Ceïde (red card) 24' | Stadium: Briskeby Stadion; Attendance: 5,114; Referee: Mohammad Usman Aslam |

| 5 October 2025 24 | Rosenborg | 2–3 | Sarpsborg 08 | Trondheim |
| 19:15 CEST (UTC+2) | Islamović 52' 86' (pen.); Zeidan (red card) 82' | Summary | Sørli 46', 87'; Karlsbakk (yellow card) 61'; Wichne (yellow card) 72'; Christiansen 79'; Jeahze (yellow card) 90+6' | Stadium: Lerkendal Stadion; Attendance: 11,373; Referee: Svein Tore Sinnes |

| 18 October 2025 25 | Bryne | 2–2 | Rosenborg | Bryne |
| 16:00 CEST (UTC+2) | Grødem (yellow card) 4'; Nemčík 62' (o.g.); Moreira 90+2' | Summary | Väänänen (yellow card) 29'; Ďuriš 30', 86'; M Ceïde (yellow card) 74'; Selnæs (yellow card) 75' | Stadium: Bryne Stadion; Referee: Ola Hobber Nilsen |

| 26 October 2025 26 | Rosenborg | 2–3 | Brann | Trondheim |
| 14:30 CET (UTC+1) | Yttergård Jenssen (yellow card) 12'; Islamović 45+2'; Pereira 52' (yellow card) 90+3' | Summary | Kornvig 20', 78'; Pedersen (yellow card) 39'; Haaland 42'; Helland (yellow card) 45+7'; Sery Larsen (yellow card) 71'; Dyngeland (yellow card) 90' | Stadium: Lerkendal Stadion; Attendance: 15,701; Referee: Sigurd Kringstad |

| 1 November 2025 27 | Molde | 4–2 | Rosenborg | Molde |
| 18:00 CET (UTC+1) | Hestad 11'; Breivik 24' (yellow card) 90+6'; Spiten-Nysæter 33'; Kabini (yellow card) 50'; Risa (yellow card) 90+1'; Roaldsøy 90+3' (yellow card) 90+3' | Summary | Islamović 16' (yellow card) 90+1'; Reitan-Sunde (yellow card) 47'; Volden (yellow card) 63'; Haugan 77' (o.g.) | Stadium: Aker Stadion; Attendance: 8,215; Referee: Tore Hansen |

| 9 November 2025 28 | Rosenborg | 1–0 | Vålerenga | Trondheim |
| 14:30 CET (UTC+1) | E Ceïde (yellow card) 40'; Fossum 86'; Tangvik (yellow card) 90+6' | Summary | Ambina (red card) 35'; Bjørdal (yellow card) 45+2'; Hedvall (yellow card) 77'; Hagen (yellow card) 90+3' | Stadium: Lerkendal Stadion; Attendance: 12,121; Referee: Kristoffer Hagenes |

| 22 November 2025 29 | Tromsø | 1–0 | Rosenborg | Tromsø |
| 14:00 CET (UTC+1) | R Yttergård Jenssen 4'; Skjærvik (yellow card) 25'; Erlien (yellow card) 34'; Warneryd (yellow card) 34' | Summary | Selnæs (yellow card) 29'; U Yttergård Jenssen 90' | Stadium: Alfheim Stadion; Attendance: 5,707; Referee: Ola Hobber Nilsen |

| 30 November 2025 30 | Rosenborg | 6–0 | Strømsgodset | Trondheim |
| 17:00 CET (UTC+1) | Bolkan Nordli 33', 60'; Ďuriš 37', 55'; Islamović 67'; Ceïde 90+5' | Summary | Farji (yellow card) 41'; Taaje (yellow card) 59' | Stadium: Lerkendal Stadion; Attendance: 10,434; Referee: Daniel Higraff |

==== Table ====
| Pos | Team | Pld | W | D | L | GF | GA | GD | Pts |
|---|---|---|---|---|---|---|---|---|---|
| 5 | Sandefjord | 30 | 15 | 3 | 12 | 55 | 42 | +13 | 48 |
| 6 | Vålerenga | 30 | 13 | 4 | 13 | 49 | 50 | −1 | 43 |
| 7 | Rosenborg | 30 | 11 | 9 | 10 | 45 | 42 | +3 | 42 |
| 8 | Fredrikstad | 30 | 11 | 9 | 10 | 38 | 35 | +3 | 42 |
| 9 | Sarpsborg 08 | 30 | 11 | 8 | 11 | 48 | 50 | −2 | 41 |

Source: Football Association of Norway (in Norwegian)
Rules for classification: 1) Points; 2) Goal difference; 3) Goals scored; 4) Head-to-head points; 5) Head-to-head goal difference; 6) Head-to-head goals scored.

=== Norwegian Cup 2025 ===
| 13 April 2025 First round | Rindal | 1–11 | Rosenborg | Storås |
| 16:00 CEST (UTC+2) | Hagen Eide 66'; Næss Bolme (yellow card) 78'; Bævre (yellow card) 86' | Summary | Þorvaldsson 30'; Holm 32', 46', 52', 58', 62', 82', 84'; Sæter 45', 88'; Reitan-Sunde 77' | Stadium: Heggøya kunstgras Attendance: 2,000; Referee: Håkon Rinaldo |

| 24 April 2025 Second round | Strindheim | 0–3 | Rosenborg | Trondheim |
| 18:00 CEST (UTC+2) | | Summary | Sæter 4' 13' (pen.); Sletsjøe (yellow card) 31'; Ole Selnæs (yellow card) 51'; Zeidan 70' | Stadium: Leangen Bolig Arena; Attendance: 1,170; Referee: Mathias Støfringshaug |

| 7 May 2025 Third round | Tromsdalen | 0–5 | Rosenborg | Tromsø |
| 18:00 CEST (UTC+2) | | Summary | Yttergård Jenssen 2'; Holm 12', 30', 37'; Þorvaldsson 61'; Volden (yellow card) 66' | Stadium: TUIL Arena; Attendance: 1,398; Referee: Johan Grundt |

| 20 May 2025 Fourth round | Kongsvinger | 2–3 (a.e.t.) | Rosenborg | Kongsvinger |
| 20:00 CEST (UTC+2) | Taylor 32'; Williams 67'; Arendrup Nielsen (yellow card) 118' | Summary | Þorvaldsson 40'; Mortensen (yellow card) 68'; Racic (yellow card) 75'; Broholm 83'; Nemčík (yellow card) 100'; Fossum 112' | Stadium: Gjemselund Stadion; Attendance: 3,049; Referee: Christian Moen |

| 25 June 2025 Quarter-finals | Rosenborg | 2–2 (a.e.t.) (2–4 p) | Sarpsborg 08 | Trondheim |
| 18:00 CEST (UTC+2) | Väänänen (yellow card) 13'; Islamović 90+5', 101' (yellow card) 101'; Selnæs (yellow card) 90+7'; Yttergård Jenssen (yellow card) 112' | Summary | Ørjasæter 39'; Tebo (yellow card) 42'; Jeahze (yellow card) 65'; Karlsbakk (yellow card) 88'; Berget 105' | Stadium: Lerkendal Stadion; Attendance: 8,169; Referee: Ola Hobber Nilsen |
| | Penalties |
| | Sæter (penalty missed); Islamović (penalty missed); Selnæs (penalty scored); Fossum (penalty scored) | | Sandberg (penalty scored); Guðjohnsen (penalty scored); Berget (penalty scored); Ndiaye (penalty scored) |

=== Norwegian Cup 2025–26 ===
| 24 September 2025 Third round | FK Haugesund | 1–4 (a.e.t.) | Rosenborg | Haugesund |
| 18:00 CEST (UTC+2) | Dia (yellow card) 29'; Grindhaug 57'; Hannola (yellow card) 62'; Nyhammer (yellow card) 90+6' | Summary | Islamović 90+4', 107'; Selnæs (yellow card) 90+4'; Dahl Reitan 94', 98' (yellow card) 90+5' | Stadium: Haugesund Stadion; Attendance: 1,045; Referee: Ola Hobber Nilsen |

| March 2026 Fourth round | Bryne | – | Rosenborg | Bryne |
| ??:?? CEST (UTC+2) | | | | Stadium: Bryne Stadion |

=== UEFA Europa Conference League ===
==== Second qualifying round ====
| 24 July 2025 First leg | Rosenborg (Norway) | 5–0 | (Lithuania) Banga Gargždai | Trondheim |
| 21:00 CEST (UTC+2) | Islamović 22', 60', 82'; Reitan-Sunde (yellow card) 51'; Bolkan Nordli 65'; Holm (yellow card) 73'; M Ceïde 86' | Summary | Emsis (yellow card) 21'; Ramanauskas (yellow card) 49' (yellow-red card) 50'; Figueredo (yellow card) 66' | Stadium: Lerkendal Stadion; Attendance: 11,822; Referee: Ian McNabb (Northern Ireland) |

| 31 July 2025 Second leg | Banga Gargždai (Lithuania) | 0–2 (0–7 agg.) | (Norway) Rosenborg | Gargždai, Lithuania |
| 19:00 CEST (UTC+2) | | Summary | Volden (yellow card) 34'; Väänänen (yellow card) 42'; Bolkan Nordli 61'; Holm 64'; Dahl Reitan (yellow card) 88' | Stadium: Gargždai Stadium; Attendance: 1,932; Referee: Jovan Kachevski (North Macedonia) |

==== Third qualifying round ====
| 7 August 2025 First leg | Rosenborg (Norway) | 0–0 | (Sweden) Hammarby | Trondheim |
| 19:00 CEST (UTC+2) | Islamović (yellow card) 86' | Summary | Eriksson (yellow card) 35'; Strand (yellow card) 80' | Stadium: Lerkendal Stadion; Attendance: 16,077; Referee: Zorbay Kücük (Turkey) |

| 14 August 2025 Second leg | Hammarby (Sweden) | 0–1 (0–1 agg.) | (Norway) Rosenborg | Stockholm, Sweden |
| 19:00 CEST (UTC+2) | Winther (yellow card) 56'; Pinas (yellow card) 84'; Vagić (yellow card) 90+2'; Tounekti (yellow card) 90+3' | Summary | Nemčík (yellow card) 35'; Sæter (yellow card) 58'; Islamović 59' (yellow card) 90' | Stadium: 3Arena; Attendance: 25,000; Referee: Vassilis Fotias (Greece) |

==== Play-off round ====
| 21 August 2025 First leg | Rosenborg (Norway) | 2–1 | (Germany) Mainz 05 | Trondheim |
| 18:00 CEST (UTC+2) | Islamović 43' (pen.); Sæter 90' | Summary | Amiri 26'; Bell (yellow card) 33'; Kohr (yellow card) 36' | Stadium: Lerkendal Stadion; Attendance: 18,293; Referee: Oleksiy Derevinskyi (Ukraine) |

| 28 August 2025 Second leg | Mainz 05 (Germany) | 4–1 (5–3 agg.) | (Norway) Rosenborg | Mainz, Germany |
| 21:00 CEST (UTC+2) | Bell 28'; Lee 43'; Weiper 44'; Amiri 58'; Nebel (yellow card) 72' | Summary | Islamović 33'; Väänänen (yellow card) 53' | Stadium: Mewa Arena; Attendance: 30,000; Referee: Sander van der Eijk (The Netherlands) |

== Squad statistics ==
=== Appearances and goals ===
As of match played 30 November 2025

| No. | Pos | Nat | Player | Total | | Eliteserien | | Norwegian Cup 2025 | | Norwegian Cup 2025–26 | | Europa Conference League | |
| No. | Pos | Nat | Player | Apps | Goals | Apps | Goals | Apps | Goals | Apps | Goals | Apps | Goals |
|---|---|---|---|---|---|---|---|---|---|---|---|---|---|
| 1 | GK | (Norway) NOR | Sander Tangvik | 40 | 0 | 30+0 | 0 | 3+0 | 0 | 1+0 | 0 | 6+0 | 0 |
| 2 | DF | (Norway) NOR | Erlend Dahl Reitan | 28 | 2 | 10+10 | 0 | 3+2 | 0 | 1+0 | 2 | 0+2 | 0 |
| 5 | MF | (Palestine) PLE | Moustafa Zeidan | 27 | 2 | 9+10 | 1 | 4+1 | 1 | 1+0 | 0 | 1+1 | 0 |
| 6 | MF | (Finland) FIN | Santeri Väänänen | 32 | 1 | 18+4 | 1 | 3+0 | 0 | 0+1 | 0 | 6+0 | 0 |
| 7 | MF | (Norway) NOR | Simen Bolkan Nordli | 19 | 4 | 12+0 | 2 | 0+0 | 0 | 1+0 | 0 | 5+1 | 2 |
| 8 | MF | (Norway) NOR | Iver Fossum | 32 | 4 | 20+4 | 3 | 2+1 | 1 | 1+0 | 0 | 1+3 | 0 |
| 9 | FW | (Norway) NOR | Ole Sæter | 28 | 6 | 3+17 | 1 | 3+1 | 4 | 0+1 | 0 | 2+1 | 1 |
| 10 | MF | (Norway) NOR | Ole Selnæs | 35 | 0 | 20+4 | 0 | 2+2 | 0 | 0+1 | 0 | 6+0 | 0 |
| 11 | FW | (Denmark) DEN | Noah Sahsah | 0 | 0 | 0+0 | 0 | 0+0 | 0 | 0+0 | 0 | 0+0 | 0 |
| 12 | GK | (Norway) NOR | Rasmus Sandberg | 2 | 0 | 0+0 | 0 | 2+0 | 0 | 0+0 | 0 | 0+0 | 0 |
| 15 | DF | (Denmark) DEN | Jonas Mortensen | 19 | 0 | 9+4 | 0 | 4+1 | 0 | 0+0 | 0 | 0+1 | 0 |
| 16 | DF | (Norway) NOR | Aslak Fonn Witry | 16 | 0 | 7+2 | 0 | 0+0 | 0 | 0+1 | 0 | 6+0 | 0 |
| 19 | DF | (Norway) NOR | Adrian Pereira | 32 | 1 | 20+3 | 1 | 1+1 | 0 | 1+0 | 0 | 5+1 | 0 |
| 21 | DF | (Slovakia) SVK | Tomáš Nemčík | 31 | 1 | 22+1 | 1 | 1+0 | 0 | 1+0 | 0 | 6+0 | 0 |
| 23 | DF | (Norway) NOR | Ulrik Yttergård Jenssen | 33 | 3 | 18+7 | 2 | 3+0 | 1 | 0+0 | 0 | 1+4 | 0 |
| 29 | FW | (Slovakia) SVK | Dávid Ďuriš | 13 | 4 | 11+1 | 4 | 0+0 | 0 | 1+0 | 0 | 0+0 | 0 |
| 33 | MF | (Norway) NOR | Tobias Dahl | 4 | 0 | 1+3 | 0 | 0+0 | 0 | 0+0 | 0 | 0+0 | 0 |
| 35 | FW | (Norway) NOR | Emil Ceïde | 37 | 5 | 27+1 | 5 | 1+1 | 0 | 0+1 | 0 | 4+2 | 0 |
| 38 | DF | (Norway) NOR | Mikkel Ceïde | 32 | 1 | 24+1 | 0 | 1+0 | 0 | 0+1 | 0 | 4+1 | 1 |
| 39 | FW | (Montenegro) MNE | Dino Islamović | 35 | 24 | 24+3 | 14 | 0+1 | 2 | 1+0 | 2 | 5+1 | 6 |
| 43 | MF | (Norway) NOR | Aleksander Borgersen | 2 | 0 | 0+2 | 0 | 0+0 | 0 | 0+0 | 0 | 0+0 | 0 |
| 45 | FW | (Norway) NOR | Jesper Reitan-Sunde | 29 | 1 | 9+8 | 0 | 5+0 | 1 | 1+0 | 0 | 5+1 | 0 |
| 50 | DF | (Norway) NOR | Håkon Volden | 19 | 0 | 7+6 | 0 | 3+1 | 0 | 1+0 | 0 | 1+0 | 0 |
| 55 | DF | (Norway) NOR | Elias Sandrød | 2 | 0 | 0+0 | 0 | 0+2 | 0 | 0+0 | 0 | 0+0 | 0 |
| 55 | MF | (Norway) NOR | Isak Holmen | 0 | 0 | 0+0 | 0 | 0+0 | 0 | 0+0 | 0 | 0+0 | 0 |
| 60 | MF | (Norway) NOR | Elias Slørdal | 1 | 0 | 0+1 | 0 | 0+0 | 0 | 0+0 | 0 | 0+0 | 0 |
Players away from Rosenborg on loan:
| 4 | DF | (Denmark) DEN | Luka Racic | 12 | 0 | 2+5 | 0 | 4+0 | 0 | 0+0 | 0 | 1+0 | 0 |
| 16 | DF | (Norway) NOR | Håkon Røsten | 0 | 0 | 0+0 | 0 | 0+0 | 0 | 0+0 | 0 | 0+0 | 0 |
| 17 | FW | (Iceland) ISL | Ísak Þorvaldsson | 8 | 3 | 0+5 | 0 | 2+1 | 3 | 0+0 | 0 | 0+0 | 0 |
| 22 | MF | (Sweden) SWE | Henry Sletsjøe | 9 | 0 | 2+3 | 0 | 4+0 | 0 | 0+0 | 0 | 0+0 | 0 |
| 29 | FW | (Norway) NOR | Oscar Aga | 0 | 0 | 0+0 | 0 | 0+0 | 0 | 0+0 | 0 | 0+0 | 0 |
| 44 | FW | (Norway) NOR | Magnus Holte | 0 | 0 | 0+0 | 0 | 0+0 | 0 | 0+0 | 0 | 0+0 | 0 |
Players who appeared for Rosenborg no longer at the club:
| 7 | MF | (Norway) NOR | Marius Sivertsen Broholm | 12 | 6 | 11+0 | 5 | 0+1 | 1 | 0+0 | 0 | 0+0 | 0 |
| 14 | FW | (Denmark) DEN | Emil Frederiksen | 0 | 0 | 0+0 | 0 | 0+0 | 0 | 0+0 | 0 | 0+0 | 0 |
| 18 | FW | (Norway) NOR | Noah Holm | 26 | 12 | 10+7 | 1 | 4+1 | 10 | 0+0 | 0 | 1+3 | 1 |
| 41 | MF | (Norway) NOR | Sverre Nypan | 10 | 1 | 7+2 | 1 | 0+1 | 0 | 0+0 | 0 | 0+0 | 0 |

=== Disciplinary record ===
As of match played 30 November 2025

| Number | Nation | Position | Name | Eliteserien | | Norwegian Cup 2025 | | Norwegian Cup 2025–26 | | Europa Conference League | | Total | |
| Number | Nation | Position | Name | Booked | Sent off (straight red) | Booked | Sent off (straight red) | Booked | Sent off (straight red) | Booked | Sent off (straight red) | Booked | Sent off (straight red) |
| 1 | (Norway) | GK | Sander Tangvik | 1 | 0 | 0 | 0 | 0 | 0 | 0 | 0 | 1 | 0 |
| 2 | (Norway) | DF | Erlend Dahl Reitan | 2 | 0 | 0 | 0 | 1 | 0 | 1 | 0 | 4 | 0 |
| 5 | (Palestine) | MF | Moustafa Zeidan | 2 | 1 | 0 | 0 | 0 | 0 | 0 | 0 | 2 | 1 |
| 6 | (Finland) | MF | Santeri Väänänen | 4 | 0 | 1 | 0 | 0 | 0 | 2 | 0 | 7 | 0 |
| 7 | (Norway) | MF | Simen Bolkan Nordli | 2 | 0 | 0 | 0 | 0 | 0 | 0 | 0 | 2 | 0 |
| 8 | (Norway) | MF | Iver Fossum | 0 | 0 | 0 | 0 | 0 | 0 | 0 | 0 | 0 | 0 |
| 9 | (Norway) | FW | Ole Sæter | 4 | 0 | 0 | 0 | 0 | 0 | 1 | 0 | 5 | 0 |
| 10 | (Norway) | MF | Ole Selnæs | 6 | 0 | 2 | 0 | 1 | 0 | 0 | 0 | 9 | 0 |
| 11 | (Denmark) | FW | Noah Sahsah | 0 | 0 | 0 | 0 | 0 | 0 | 0 | 0 | 0 | 0 |
| 12 | (Norway) | GK | Rasmus Sandberg | 0 | 0 | 0 | 0 | 0 | 0 | 0 | 0 | 0 | 0 |
| 15 | (Denmark) | DF | Jonas Mortensen | 0 | 0 | 1 | 0 | 0 | 0 | 0 | 0 | 1 | 0 |
| 16 | (Norway) | DF | Aslak Fonn Witry | 2 | 0 | 0 | 0 | 0 | 0 | 0 | 0 | 2 | 0 |
| 19 | (Norway) | DF | Adrian Pereira | 4 | 0 | 0 | 0 | 0 | 0 | 0 | 0 | 4 | 0 |
| 21 | (Slovakia) | DF | Tomáš Nemčík | 1 | 0 | 1 | 0 | 0 | 0 | 1 | 0 | 3 | 0 |
| 23 | (Norway) | DF | Ulrik Yttergård Jenssen | 8 | 0 | 1 | 0 | 0 | 0 | 0 | 0 | 9 | 0 |
| 29 | (Slovakia) | FW | Dávid Ďuriš | 0 | 0 | 0 | 0 | 0 | 0 | 0 | 0 | 0 | 0 |
| 33 | (Norway) | MF | Tobias Dahl | 0 | 0 | 0 | 0 | 0 | 0 | 0 | 0 | 0 | 0 |
| 35 | (Norway) | FW | Emil Ceïde | 4 | 0 | 0 | 0 | 0 | 0 | 0 | 0 | 4 | 0 |
| 38 | (Norway) | DF | Mikkel Ceïde | 5 | 1 | 0 | 0 | 0 | 0 | 0 | 0 | 5 | 1 |
| 39 | (Montenegro) | FW | Dino Islamović | 3 | 0 | 1 | 0 | 0 | 0 | 2 | 0 | 5 | 0 |
| 43 | (Norway) | MF | Aleksander Borgersen | 0 | 0 | 0 | 0 | 0 | 0 | 0 | 0 | 0 | 0 |
| 45 | (Norway) | FW | Jesper Reitan-Sunde | 1 | 0 | 0 | 0 | 0 | 0 | 1 | 0 | 2 | 0 |
| 50 | (Norway) | DF | Håkon Volden | 1 | 0 | 1 | 0 | 0 | 0 | 1 | 0 | 3 | 0 |
| 55 | (Norway) | DF | Elias Sandrød | 0 | 0 | 0 | 0 | 0 | 0 | 0 | 0 | 0 | 0 |
| 56 | (Norway) | MF | Isak Holmen | 0 | 0 | 0 | 0 | 0 | 0 | 0 | 0 | 0 | 0 |
| 60 | (Norway) | MF | Elias Slørdal | 0 | 0 | 0 | 0 | 0 | 0 | 0 | 0 | 0 | 0 |
Players away from Rosenborg on loan:
| 4 | (Denmark) | DF | Luka Racic | 0 | 0 | 1 | 0 | 0 | 0 | 0 | 0 | 1 | 0 |
| 16 | (Norway) | DF | Håkon Røsten | 0 | 0 | 0 | 0 | 0 | 0 | 0 | 0 | 0 | 0 |
| 17 | (Iceland) | FW | Ísak Þorvaldsson | 1 | 0 | 0 | 0 | 0 | 0 | 0 | 0 | 1 | 0 |
| 22 | (Sweden) | MF | Henry Sletsjøe | 2 | 0 | 1 | 0 | 0 | 0 | 0 | 0 | 3 | 0 |
| 29 | (Norway) | FW | Oscar Aga | 0 | 0 | 0 | 0 | 0 | 0 | 0 | 0 | 0 | 0 |
| 44 | (Norway) | FW | Magnus Holte | 0 | 0 | 0 | 0 | 0 | 0 | 0 | 0 | 0 | 0 |
Players who appeared for Rosenborg no longer at the club:
| 7 | (Norway) | MF | Marius Sivertsen Broholm | 3 | 0 | 0 | 0 | 0 | 0 | 0 | 0 | 3 | 0 |
| 14 | (Denmark) | FW | Emil Frederiksen | 0 | 0 | 0 | 0 | 0 | 0 | 0 | 0 | 0 | 0 |
| 18 | (Norway) | FW | Noah Holm | 2 | 0 | 0 | 0 | 0 | 0 | 1 | 0 | 3 | 0 |
| 41 | (Norway) | MF | Sverre Nypan | 0 | 0 | 0 | 0 | 0 | 0 | 0 | 0 | 0 | 0 |
| | | | TOTALS | 58 | 2 | 10 | 0 | 2 | 0 | 10 | 0 | 80 | 2 |

== See also ==
- Rosenborg BK seasons
