= 2024 Rosenborg BK season =

Rosenborg 2024 football season

Rosenborg
2024 season
- Chairman: Cecilie Gotaas Johnsen
- Coach: Alfred Johansson
- Stadium: Lerkendal Stadion
- Eliteserien: 4th
- Norwegian Cup: Third round
- Top goalscorer: League: Ole Sæter (10 goals); All: Marius Broholm; Ole Sæter (10 each)
- Highest home attendance: 21,426 vs KFUM (16 May); Molde (1 September); Brann (20 October)
- Lowest home attendance: 10,434 vs Odd (7 July)
- Average home league attendance: 14,803 (23 November)
Home colours	Away colours	Third colours

The 2024 season was Rosenborg's 45th consecutive year in the top flight now known as Eliteserien, their 56th season in the top flight of Norwegian football. In addition to the Eliteserien, the club participate in the Norwegian Cup. This was Alfred Johansson's first season in charge of Rosenborg.

== Squad ==
Note: Flags indicate national team as defined under FIFA eligibility rules; some limited exceptions apply. Players may hold more than one non-FIFA nationality.

No.	Pos.	Nation	Player
1	GK	(Norway) NOR	Sander Tangvik
2	DF	(Norway) NOR	Erlend Dahl Reitan
3	DF	(Sweden) SWE	Jonathan Augustinsson
4	DF	(Denmark) DEN	Luka Racic
5	DF	(Palestine) PLE	Moustafa Zeidan
6	MF	(Finland) FIN	Santeri Väänänen
7	MF	(Norway) NOR	Markus Henriksen (captain)
9	FW	(Norway) NOR	Ole Sæter
10	MF	(Norway) NOR	Ole Selnæs
12	GK	(Norway) NOR	Rasmus Sandberg
19	DF	(Norway) NOR	Adrian Pereira
20	MF	(Norway) NOR	Edvard Tagseth
21	DF	(Slovakia) SVK	Tomáš Nemčík

No.	Pos.	Nation	Player
23	DF	(Norway) NOR	Ulrik Yttergård Jenssen
25	DF	(Sweden) SWE	Adam Andersson
27	FW	(Norway) NOR	Noah Holm
33	MF	(Norway) NOR	Tobias Dahl
35	FW	(Norway) NOR	Emil Ceïde
38	DF	(Norway) NOR	Mikkel Ceïde
39	MF	(Norway) NOR	Marius Sivertsen Broholm
41	MF	(Norway) NOR	Sverre Nypan
44	FW	(Norway) NOR	Magnus Holte
45	DF	(Norway) NOR	Jesper Reitan-Sunde
46	FW	(Denmark) DEN	Noah Sahsah
50	DF	(Norway) NOR	Håkon Volden

== Transfers ==
=== Winter ===
In: Note: Flags indicate national team as defined under FIFA eligibility rules; some limited exceptions apply. Players may hold more than one non-FIFA nationality.

No.	Pos.	Nation	Player
12	GK	(Norway) NOR	Rasmus Sandberg (from (Norway) Stjørdals-Blink)
21	DF	(Slovakia) SVK	Tomáš Nemčík (on loan from (Slovakia) Žilina, then made permanent)
22	FW	(Finland) FIN	Agon Sadiku (loan return from (Norway) Start)
39	MF	(Norway) NOR	Marius Sivertsen Broholm (loan return from (Norway) Kristiansund)
40	FW	(Poland) POL	Pawel Chrupalla (loan return from (Poland) Wisła Płock)

Out: Note: Flags indicate national team as defined under FIFA eligibility rules; some limited exceptions apply. Players may hold more than one non-FIFA nationality.

No.	Pos.	Nation	Player
1	GK	(Norway) NOR	André Hansen (to (Norway) Odd)
5	FW	(Norway) NOR	Per Ciljan Skjelbred (to (Norway) Ranheim)
16	DF	(Norway) NOR	Håkon Røsten (on loan to (Norway) Ranheim)
17	FW	(Iceland) ISL	Ísak Þorvaldsson (on loan to (Iceland) Breiðablik)
18	MF	(Norway) NOR	Morten Bjørlo (to (Norway) Fredrikstad, previously on loan at HamKam)
21	FW	(Norway) NOR	Olaus Skarsem (to (Bulgaria) CSKA Sofia)
28	FW	(Sweden) SWE	Rasmus Wiedesheim-Paul (to (Sweden) Halmstad)
29	FW	(Norway) NOR	Oscar Aga (on loan to (Norway) FFK, extended loan from previous season)

=== Summer ===
In: Note: Flags indicate national team as defined under FIFA eligibility rules; some limited exceptions apply. Players may hold more than one non-FIFA nationality.

No.	Pos.	Nation	Player
4	DF	(Denmark) DEN	Luka Racic (free transfer)
5	MF	(Palestine) PLE	Moustafa Zeidan (on loan from (Sweden) Malmö FF)
35	FW	(Norway) NOR	Emil Ceïde (on loan from (Italy) Sassuolo)
46	FW	(Denmark) DEN	Noah Sahsah (on loan from (Denmark) FC Copenhagen)

Out: Note: Flags indicate national team as defined under FIFA eligibility rules; some limited exceptions apply. Players may hold more than one non-FIFA nationality.

No.	Pos.	Nation	Player
2	DF	(Norway) NOR	Leo Cornic (to Tromsø)
8	MF	(Norway) NOR	Tobias Børkeeiet (to (Austria) Rapid Wien)
11	FW	(Canada) CAN	Jayden Nelson (on loan to (Germany) Ulm)
14	FW	(Denmark) DEN	Emil Frederiksen (on loan to (Denmark) Horsens)
22	FW	(Finland) FIN	Agon Sadiku (to FC Emmen)
40	FW	(Norway) NOR	Pawel Chrupalla (on loan to Sarpsborg 08)

== Friendlies ==
18 January 2024	UD Las Palmas U19 (Spain)	1–0	(Norway) Rosenborg	Las Palmas, Spain
12:00 CET (UTC+1)	González 16'	Summary		Stadium: Ciudad Deportiva UD Las Palmas

23 January 2024	UD Las Palmas Atlético (Spain)	0–0	(Norway) Rosenborg	Las Palmas, Spain
12:00 CET (UTC+1)		Summary		Stadium: Ciudad Deportiva UD Las Palmas

2 February 2024	Rosenborg	8–0	Folkets Lag	Trondheim
13:00 CET (UTC+1)	Broholm 6', 19', 22'; Røsten 9'; Reitan-Sunde 20'; Alseth 40' (o.g.); Nypan 59', 69'	Summary		Stadium: Koteng Arena; Attendance: 300

4 February 2024	Ranheim	1–1	Rosenborg	Kyrksæterøra
16:00 CET (UTC+1)	Bye 20'	Summary	Nypan 14'	Stadium: Sodvinhallen; Attendance: 300

9 February 2024	Rosenborg	2–1	Aalesund	Trondheim
12:00 CET (UTC+1)	Selnæs 56'; Sæveraas 83'	Summary	Diop 45'	Stadium: Koteng Arena; Attendance: 300

15 February 2024	Brann	2–0	Rosenborg	Marbella, Spain
18:00 CET (UTC+1)	Mathisen 60'; Horn Myhre 62'	Summary		Stadium: Marbella Football Center

21 February 2024	Rosenborg	1–4	Vålerenga	Marbella, Spain
16:00 CET (UTC+1)	Henriksen 33'	Summary	Håkans 7'; Strand 31', 45'; Rijks 35'	Stadium: Atalaya Football Center

2 March 2024	Molde	1–1	Rosenborg	Molde
16:30 CET (UTC+1)	Ødegård 72'	Summary	Nelson 53'	Stadium: Aker Stadion; Attendance: 500

9 March 2024	Rosenborg	3–0	Tromsø	Trondheim
12:00 CET (UTC+1)	Reitan-Sunde 8'; Henriksen 14'; Nypan 42'	Summary		Stadium: Koteng Arena; Attendance: 800

15 March 2024	Kristiansund	2–2	Rosenborg	Frøya
14:00 CET (UTC+1)	Jarl 51'; Sivertsen 57'	Summary	Nelson 37'; Holte 70'	Stadium: Frøya Storhall; Attendance: 700

17 March 2024	Rosenborg	2–0	Nardo	Trondheim
11:30 CET (UTC+1)	Tagseth 75'; Own Goal 83' (o.g.)	Summary		Stadium: Lerkendal Stadion

24 March 2024	Viking	5–0	Rosenborg	Stavanger
15:00 CET (UTC+1)	Langås 17'; Salvesen 29'; Svendsen 49'; Tripić 62'; Auklend 72'	Summary		Stadium: Viking Stadion; Attendance: 1,562

15 July 2024	Rosenborg (Norway)	1–0	(England) Manchester United	Trondheim
18:00 CEST (UTC+2)	Holm 90+3'	Summary		Stadium: Lerkendal Stadion; Attendance: 21,013; Referee: Sigurd Smehus Kringstad

== Competitions ==
=== Eliteserien ===
==== Results summary ====
Overall								Home						Away					
Pld	W	D	L	GF	GA	GD	Pts	W	D	L	GF	GA	GD	W	D	L	GF	GA	GD
30	16	5	9	52	39	+13	53	10	2	3	26	14	+12	6	3	6	26	25	+1

Last updated: 1 December 2024.
Source: see below

==== Results by round ====
Round	1	2	3	4	5	6	7	8	9	10	11	12	13	14	15	16	17	18	19	20	21	22	23	24	25	26	27	28	29	30
Ground	H	B	H	B	H	B	B	H	B	H	H	B	H	B	H	B	H	B	H	B	H	B	H	B	H	B	H	B	H	B
Result	W	L	W	W	L	L	D	L	L	W	D	L	W	L	W	D	W	L	W	W	W	D	W	W	L	W	W	W	D	W
Position	3	5	3	3	4	9	6	7	10	8	8	10	8	11	7	8	7	8	6	6	6	5	5	5	6	5	5	5	5	4

Updated to match(es) played on 1 December 2024. Source: see below
A = Away; H = Home; W = Win; D = Draw; L = Loss

==== Results ====
1 April 2024 1	Rosenborg	2–0	Sandefjord	Trondheim
17:00 CEST (UTC+2)	Selnæs (yellow card) 31'; Henriksen (yellow card) 32'; Sæter 65' (yellow card) 67'; Frederiksen 90+6'	Summary	Berglie (yellow card) 55'; Ottosson (yellow card) 58'	Stadium: Lerkendal Stadion; Attendance: 14,605; Referee: Sivert Amland

7 April 2024 2	Strømsgodset	1–0	Rosenborg	Drammen
17:00 CEST (UTC+2)	Tómasson 62'; Vilsvik (yellow card) 66'	Summary	Henriksen (yellow card) 88'	Stadium: Marienlyst Stadion; Attendance: 6,206; Referee: Daniel Higraff

14 April 2024 3	Rosenborg	1–0	HamKam	Trondheim
17:00 CEST (UTC+2)	Selnæs 16'; Nemčík (yellow card) 47'; Nypan (yellow card) 87'	Summary	Sørås (yellow card) 38'; Norheim (yellow card) 41' (yellow-red card); Mares (yellow card) 87'	Stadium: Lerkendal Stadion; Attendance: 11,278; Referee: Marius Hansen Grøtta

21 April 2024 4	Haugesund	1–3	Rosenborg	Haugesund
17:00 CEST (UTC+2)	Leite (yellow card) 40' (goal) 50'; Niyukuri (yellow card) 88'	Summary	Sæter 10', 43' (penalty missed) 74'; Selnæs (yellow card) 28'; Yttergård Jenssen (yellow card) 54'; Dahl Reitan (yellow card) 76'; Broholm 90+6'	Stadium: Haugesund Stadion; Attendance: 5,023; Referee: Ola Hobber Nilsen

27 April 2024 5	Rosenborg	1–3	Bodø/Glimt	Trondheim
18:00 CEST (UTC+2)	Sæter 54' (pen.)	Summary	Høgh 7'; Žugelj 36'; Evjen (yellow card) 40'; Grønbæk 51' (yellow card) 90+1'; Bjørkan (yellow card) 65'; Hauge (yellow card) 67'	Stadium: Lerkendal Stadion; Attendance: 21,276; Referee: Rohit Saggi

4 May 2024 6	Brann	3–0	Rosenborg	Bergen
18:00 CEST (UTC+2)	Blomberg 3'; Heggebø (yellow card) 47' (goal) 49'; Castro 74'	Summary	Yttergård Jenssen (yellow card) 35'; Nelson (yellow card) 86'	Stadium: Brann Stadion; Attendance: 16,750; Referee: Espen Eskås

11 May 2024 7	Molde	2–2	Rosenborg	Molde
18:00 CEST (UTC+2)	Breivik (yellow card) 30'; Eikrem 33'; Stenevik 79'; Løvik (yellow card) 85'	Summary	Nypan 59'; Sæter 76'; Tagseth (yellow card) 82'; Pereira (yellow card) 82'	Stadium: Aker Stadion; Attendance: 10,746; Referee: Ola Hobber Nilsen

16 May 2024 8	Rosenborg	1–3	KFUM Oslo	Trondheim
18:00 CEST (UTC+2)	Njie 59' (o.g.); Pereira (yellow card) 77'; Tagseth (yellow card) 80'; Nelson (yellow card) 90'	Summary	Hestnes (yellow card) 25'; Rasch 38'; Nosa Dahl 47'; Nuñez (yellow card) 54' (goal) 62'; Svindland (yellow card) 80'	Stadium: Lerkendal Stadion; Attendance: 21,426; Referee: Sigurd Kringstad

20 May 2024 9	Tromsø	3–2	Rosenborg	Tromsø
19:15 CEST (UTC+2)	Erlien 49'; Skjærvik 51'; Jenssen (yellow card) 66'; Hjertø-Dahl 77'; Nordås (yellow card) 79'	Summary	Reitan-Sunde 1'; Broholm 43' (pen.); Väänänen (yellow card) 71'; Selnæs (yellow card) 88'; Nelson (yellow card) 90+1'	Stadium: Alfheim Stadion; Attendance: 4,713; Referee: Sivert Amland

26 May 2024 10	Rosenborg	2–1	Kristiansund	Trondheim
17:00 CEST (UTC+2)	Reitan-Sunde (yellow card) 12'; Nelson 49'; Väänänen (yellow card) 84'; Broholm 86'	Summary	Isaksen 35'; Ulvestad (yellow card) 75'	Stadium: Lerkendal Stadion; Attendance: 11,649; Referee: Svein Tore Sinnes

2 June 2024 11	Rosenborg	1–1	Fredrikstad	Trondheim
19:15 CEST (UTC+2)	Pereira (yellow card) 37'; Väänänen 53'	Summary	Kjelsrud Johansen 90+5'	Stadium: Lerkendal Stadion; Attendance: 11,922; Referee: Marius Hansen Grøtta

30 June 2024 12	Viking	4–2	Rosenborg	Stavanger
15:00 CEST (UTC+2)	Tripić 19' (pen.) 73'; D'Agostino (yellow card) 47'; Bjørshol 68'; Christiansen 84'	Summary	Tagseth 48'; Selnæs (yellow card) 56'; Sæter 90+4' (pen.)	Stadium: SR-Bank Arena; Attendance: 11,512; Referee: Ola Hobber Nilsen

7 July 2024 13	Rosenborg	2–1	Odd	Trondheim
19:15 CEST (UTC+2)	Nypan 26'; Henriksen 37' (yellow card) 39'; Tagseth (yellow card) 90+2'; Tangvik (yellow card) 90+9'	Report	Hussain (yellow card) 9'; Miettinen (yellow card) 45+1'; Baccay (yellow card) 65'; Bang-Kittilsen (yellow card) 78'; Ingebrigtsen 81'; Johansen (yellow card) 84'	Stadium: Lerkendal Stadion; Attendance: 10,434; Referee: Svein Tore Sinnes

12 July 2024 14	Sarpsborg 08	4–1	Rosenborg	Sarpsborg
19:00 CEST (UTC+2)	Meister 11', 26', 31', 69'; Christiansen (yellow card) 74'	Summary	Yttergård Jenssen (yellow card) 55'; Sæter 76'; Nemčík (yellow card) 83'	Stadium: Sarpsborg Stadion; Attendance: 5,304; Referee: Daniel Higraff

21 August 2024 15	Rosenborg	4–0	Lillestrøm	Trondheim
19:00 CEST (UTC+2)	Yttergård Jenssen (yellow card) 2'; Broholm 18'; Nypan 46', 72' 78' (pen.)	Summary	Vá (yellow card) 27'	Stadium: Lerkendal Stadion; Attendance: 0 (Match played without attendance due to protests when the match was supposed to be played 21 July); Referee: Ola Hobber Nilsen

28 July 2024 16	Fredrikstad	2–2	Rosenborg	Fredrikstad
17:00 CEST (UTC+2)	Bjørlo 15'; Skaret (yellow card) 34'; Traoré 37'; Stray Molde (yellow card) 77'; Woledzi (yellow card) 77'	Summary	Reitan-Sunde 3'; Sæter 69'; Dahl Reitan (yellow card) 77'	Stadium: Fredrikstad Stadion; Attendance: 10,630; Referee: Tore Hansen

4 August 2024 17	Rosenborg	1–0	Tromsø	Trondheim
17:00 CEST (UTC+2)	Yttergård Jenssen (yellow card) 28'; Holm 64'; Broholm (yellow card) 85'	Summary	Thierno Barry (yellow card) 9'; Antonsen (yellow card) 58'; Skjærvik (yellow card) 70'; Nilsen (yellow card) 80'	Stadium: Lerkendal Stadion; Attendance: 11,602; Referee: Mohammad Usman Aslam

11 August 2024 18	KFUM Oslo	1–0	Rosenborg	Oslo
17:00 CEST (UTC+2)	Aleesami (yellow card) 11' (yellow-red card) 58'; Njie (yellow card) 39'; Nuñez (penalty missed) 51' 51'; San[dal (yellow card) 90+6'	Summary	Nemčík (yellow card) 33'; Tangvik (yellow card) 50'; Sæter (yellow card) 63'	Stadium: KFUM-Arena; Attendance: 3,300; Referee: Kristoffer Hagenes

18 August 2024 19	Rosenborg	2–1	Viking	Trondheim
17:00 CEST (UTC+2)	Yttergård Jenssen 26' (yellow card) 90+3'; Pereira 35' (yellow card) 61'; Nypan (yellow card) 67'; E. Ceïde (yellow card) 81'	Summary	Bjørshol (yellow card) 48'; Svendsen 79' (yellow card) 55'	Stadium: Lerkendal Stadion; Attendance: 12,218; Referee: Espen Eskås

25 August 2024 20	Odd	1–3	Rosenborg	Skien
17:00 CEST (UTC+2)	Ruud (yellow card) 19'; Børven 50'	Summary	Holm 26'; Pereira (yellow card) 40'; Andersson (yellow card) 60'; Broholm 65', 85'	Stadium: Skagerak Arena; Attendance: 5,048; Referee: Svein Tore Sinnes

1 September 2024 21	Rosenborg	2–1	Molde	Trondheim
17:00 CEST (UTC+2)	Holm (yellow card) 31'; Pereira 50'; M. Ceïde (yellow card) 81'; Sæter (yellow card) 84'; Tagseth 90+2'	Summary	Brynhildsen 5'; Eriksen (yellow card) 8'; Fjørtoft Løvik (yellow card) 34'	Stadium: Lerkendal Stadion; Attendance: 21,426; Referee: Tore Hansen

15 September 2024 22	Lillestrøm	1–1	Rosenborg	Lillestrøm
19:15 CEST (UTC+2)	Lehne Olsen 9'; Charles (yellow card) 23'; Larsson (yellow card) 68'	Summary	Nemčík (yellow card) 22'; Holm 50'	Stadium: Åråsen Stadion; Attendance: 9,731; Referee: Sigurd Kringstad

22 September 2024 23	Rosenborg	4–0	Haugesund	Trondheim
17:00 CEST (UTC+2)	Holm 12'; E. Ceïde 38'; Nypan 61'; Sæter 88'	Summary	Diarra (yellow card) 54'	Stadium: Lerkendal Stadion; Attendance: 12,328; Referee: Sivert Amland

29 September 2024 24	Sandefjord	0–1	Rosenborg	Sandefjord
19:15 CEST (UTC+2)	Amin (yellow card) 52'; Dunsby (yellow card) 53'	Summary	Tagseth 62' (yellow card) 71'	Stadium: Release Arena; Attendance: 4,701; Referee: Kristoffer Hagenes

20 October 2024 25	Rosenborg	1–2	Brann	Trondheim
14:30 CEST (UTC+2)	Nypan 53'	Summary	Kornvig 7'; Kartum (yellow card) 44'; Heggebø 49' (pen.); Dyngeland (yellow card) 74'; Horn Myhre (yellow card) 90+3'	Stadium: Lerkendal Stadion; Attendance: 21,426; Referee: Ola Hobber Nilsen

28 October 2024 26	Bodø/Glimt	2–3	Rosenborg	Bodø
19:00 CET (UTC+1)	Bjørkan 40'; Zinckernagel 50'	Summary	Tagseth 36'; Pereira 56'; Nemčík (yellow card) 58'; Tangvik (yellow card) 67'; Yttergård Jenssen (yellow card) 80'; Sahsah 90+2'; Broholm (yellow card) 90+6'	Stadium: Aspmyra Stadion; Attendance: 6,821; Referee: Mohammad Usman Aslam

3 November 2024 27	Rosenborg	1–0	Strømsgodset	Trondheim
19:15 CET (UTC+1)	Pereira (yellow card) 38'; Nemčík (yellow card) 88'; Dahl Reitan 90+4'; Sandberg (yellow card) 90+5'	Summary	Tómasson (yellow card) 86'	Stadium: Lerkendal Stadion; Attendance: 12,424; Referee: Tore Hansen

10 November 2024 28	HamKam	0–2	Rosenborg	Hamar
17:00 CET (UTC+1)		Summary	Sæter 3' (pen.); Broholm 6'; Zeidan (yellow card) 28'	Stadium: Briskeby Stadion; Attendance: 5,334; Referee: Sigurd Kringstad

23 November 2024 29	Rosenborg	1–1	Sarpsborg 08	Trondheim
17:00 CET (UTC+1)	Dahl Reitan 90+2' (yellow card) 90+7'	Summary	Sher (yellow card) 45+1'; Wichne (yellow card) 45+1'; Berget 90+4'; Nilsen Tangen (yellow card) 90+6'; Ødegaard (yellow card) 90+6'	Stadium: Lerkendal Stadion; Attendance: 13,222; Referee: Rohit Saggi

1 December 2024 30	Kristiansund	0–4	Rosenborg	Kristiansund
17:00 CET (UTC+1)	Isaksen (yellow card) 65'	Summary	Nypan 20'; Broholm 49'; Tagseth 68'; Ceïde 78'; Sahsah (yellow card) 89'	Stadium: Nordmøre Stadion; Attendance: 4,309; Referee: Ola Hobber Nilsen

==== Table ====
Pos	Team	Pld	W	D	L	GF	GA	GD	Pts	Qualification or relegation
2	Brann	30	17	8	5	55	33	+22	59	Qualification for the Champions League second qualifying round
3	Viking	30	16	9	5	61	39	+22	57	Qualification for the Conference League second qualifying round
4	Rosenborg	30	16	5	9	52	39	+13	53	Qualification for the Conference League second qualifying round
5	Molde	30	15	7	8	64	36	+28	52	
6	Fredrikstad	30	14	9	7	39	35	+4	51	Qualification for the Europa League third qualifying round (Note: Fredrikstad qualified for the Europa League third qualifying round by winning the 2024 Norwegian Football Cup.)

Source: Football Association of Norway (in Norwegian)
Rules for classification: 1) Points; 2) Goal difference; 3) Goals scored; 4) Head-to-head points; 5) Head-to-head goal difference; 6) Head-to-head goals scored.

=== Norwegian Cup ===
10 April 2024 First Round	Sverresborg	0–6	Rosenborg	Trondheim
18:00 CEST (UTC+2)	Ntambwe (yellow card) 19'	Summary	Broholm 9', 85'; Sadiku 21' (pen.) 70', 87'; Nelson 25'; Tagseth (yellow card) 63'	Stadium: Havsteinbanen; Attendance: 1,200; Referee: Mathias Støfringshaug

24 April 2024 Second Round	Ull/Kisa	1–3	Rosenborg	Jessheim
18:00 CEST (UTC+2)	Skille 29'; Bergum (yellow card) 55'	Summary	Tagseth 7', 17'; Volden (yellow card) 66'; Väänänen 77'	Stadium: Jessheim Stadion; Attendance: 1,918; Referee: Ali Al Hatam

1 May 2024 Third Round	Fredrikstad	1–0	Rosenborg	Fredrikstad
14:30 CEST (UTC+2)	Aukland (yellow card) 29'; Bjørlo (yellow card) 72'; Woledzi (yellow card) 77'; Aga 90+1'	Summary	Cornic (yellow card) 45'; Nelson (yellow card) 55'	Stadium: Fredrikstad Stadion; Attendance: 6,073; Referee: Kristoffer Hagenes

== Squad statistics ==
=== Appearances and goals ===
As of match played 1 December 2024

No.	Pos	Nat	Player	Total		Eliteserien		Norwegian Cup	
No.	Pos	Nat	Player	Apps	Goals	Apps	Goals	Apps	Goals
1	GK	(Norway) NOR	Sander Tangvik	31	0	29+0	0	2+0	0
2	DF	(Norway) NOR	Erlend Dahl Reitan	26	2	22+2	2	1+1	0
3	DF	(Sweden) SWE	Jonathan Augustinsson	0	0	0+0	0	0+0	0
4	DF	(Denmark) DEN	Luka Racic	7	0	1+6	0	0+0	0
5	MF	(Palestine) PLE	Moustafa Zeidan	12	0	8+4	0	0+0	0
6	MF	(Finland) FIN	Santeri Väänänen	20	2	12+6	1	2+0	1
7	MF	(Norway) NOR	Markus Henriksen	15	1	13+0	1	1+1	0
9	FW	(Norway) NOR	Ole Sæter	24	10	11+12	10	0+1	0
10	MF	(Norway) NOR	Ole Selnæs	25	1	20+2	1	1+2	0
12	GK	(Norway) NOR	Rasmus Sandberg	2	0	1+0	0	1+0	0
19	DF	(Norway) NOR	Adrian Pereira	20	3	15+4	3	1+0	0
20	MF	(Norway) NOR	Edvard Tagseth	28	7	23+2	5	3+0	2
21	DF	(Slovakia) SVK	Tomáš Nemčík	23	0	18+3	0	2+0	0
23	DF	(Norway) NOR	Ulrik Yttergård Jenssen	30	1	27+0	1	3+0	0
25	DF	(Sweden) SWE	Adam Andersson	8	0	1+6	0	0+1	0
27	FW	(Norway) NOR	Noah Holm	17	4	12+5	4	0+0	0
33	MF	(Norway) NOR	Tobias Dahl	3	0	0+2	0	0+1	0
35	FW	(Norway) NOR	Emil Ceïde	12	1	7+5	1	0+0	0
38	DF	(Norway) NOR	Mikkel Ceïde	28	1	24+3	1	0+1	0
39	MF	(Norway) NOR	Marius Sivertsen Broholm	31	10	25+4	8	2+0	2
41	MF	(Norway) NOR	Sverre Nypan	30	8	25+3	8	0+2	0
44	FW	(Norway) NOR	Magnus Holte	7	0	1+6	0	0+0	0
45	FW	(Norway) NOR	Jesper Reitan-Sunde	28	2	20+6	2	0+2	0
46	FW	(Denmark) DEN	Noah Sahsah	7	1	0+7	1	0+0	0
50	DF	(Norway) NOR	Håkon Volden	9	0	2+4	0	3+0	0
55	DF	(Norway) NOR	Elias Sandrød	1	0	0+1	0	0+0	0
57	FW	(Norway) NOR	Daniel Thorstensen	1	0	0+1	0	0+0	0
Players away from Rosenborg on loan:
11	FW	(Canada) CAN	Jayden Nelson	14	2	4+7	1	3+0	1
14	FW	(Denmark) DEN	Emil Frederiksen	13	1	4+7	1	1+1	0
16	DF	(Norway) NOR	Håkon Røsten	0	0	0+0	0	0+0	0
17	FW	(Iceland) ISL	Ísak Þorvaldsson	0	0	0+0	0	0+0	0
29	FW	(Norway) NOR	Oscar Aga	0	0	0+0	0	0+0	0
40	FW	(Poland) POL	Pawel Chrupalla	0	0	0+0	0	0+0	0
Players who appeared for Rosenborg no longer at the club:
8	MF	(Norway) NOR	Tobias Børkeeiet	3	0	0+1	0	2+0	0
22	FW	(Finland) FIN	Agon Sadiku	6	3	0+3	0	3+0	3
32	DF	(Norway) NOR	Leo Cornic	9	0	3+4	0	2+0	0

=== Disciplinary record ===
As of match played 1 December 2024

Number	Nation	Position	Name	Eliteserien		Norwegian Cup		Total	
Number	Nation	Position	Name	Booked	Sent off (straight red)	Booked	Sent off (straight red)	Booked	Sent off (straight red)
1	(Norway)	GK	Sander Tangvik	3	0	0	0	3	0
2	(Norway)	DF	Erlend Dahl Reitan	3	0	0	0	3	0
3	(Sweden)	DF	Jonathan Augustinsson	0	0	0	0	0	0
4	(Denmark)	DF	Luka Racic	0	0	0	0	0	0
5	(Palestine)	MF	Moustafa Zeidan	1	0	0	0	1	0
6	(Finland)	MF	Santeri Väänänen	2	0	0	0	2	0
7	(Norway)	MF	Markus Henriksen	2	0	0	0	2	0
9	(Norway)	FW	Ole Sæter	3	0	0	0	3	0
10	(Norway)	MF	Ole Selnæs	4	0	0	0	4	0
12	(Norway)	GK	Rasmus Sandberg	1	0	0	0	1	0
19	(Norway)	DF	Adrian Pereira	6	0	0	0	6	0
20	(Norway)	MF	Edvard Tagseth	4	0	1	0	5	0
21	(Slovakia)	DF	Tomáš Nemčík	6	0	0	0	6	0
23	(Norway)	DF	Ulrik Yttergård Jenssen	7	0	0	0	7	0
25	(Sweden)	DF	Adam Andersson	1	0	0	0	1	0
27	(Norway)	FW	Noah Holm	1	0	0	0	1	0
33	(Norway)	MF	Tobias Dahl	0	0	0	0	0	0
35	(Norway)	FW	Emil Ceïde	1	0	0	0	1	0
38	(Norway)	DF	Mikkel Ceïde	1	0	0	0	1	0
39	(Norway)	MF	Marius Sivertsen Broholm	2	0	0	0	2	0
41	(Norway)	MF	Sverre Nypan	2	0	0	0	2	0
44	(Norway)	FW	Magnus Holte	0	0	0	0	0	0
45	(Norway)	FW	Jesper Reitan-Sunde	1	0	0	0	1	0
46	(Denmark)	FW	Noah Sahsah	1	0	0	0	1	0
50	(Norway)	DF	Håkon Volden	0	0	1	0	1	0
55	(Norway)	DF	Elias Sandrød	0	0	0	0	0	0
57	(Norway)	FW	Daniel Thorstensen	0	0	0	0	0	0
Players away from Rosenborg on loan:
11	(Canada)	FW	Jayden Nelson	3	0	1	0	4	0
14	(Denmark)	FW	Emil Frederiksen	0	0	0	0	0	0
16	(Norway)	DF	Håkon Røsten	0	0	0	0	0	0
17	(Iceland)	FW	Ísak Þorvaldsson	0	0	0	0	0	0
29	(Norway)	FW	Oscar Aga	0	0	0	0	0	0
40	(Poland)	FW	Pawel Chrupalla	0	0	0	0	0	0
Players who appeared for Rosenborg no longer at the club:
8	(Norway)	MF	Tobias Børkeeiet	0	0	0	0	0	0
22	(Finland)	FW	Agon Sadiku	0	0	0	0	0	0
32	(Norway)	DF	Leo Cornic	0	0	1	0	1	0
			TOTALS	50	0	4	0	54	0

== See also ==
- Rosenborg BK seasons
