= Luka Racic =

Danish footballer (born 1999)

Personal information
- Full name: Luka Racic
- Date of birth: 8 May 1999 (age 27)
- Place of birth: Greve, Denmark
- Height: 1.89 m (6 ft 2 in)
- Position: Centre-back

Team information
- Current team: Kauno Žalgiris
- Number: 4

Youth career
- –2014: Rosenhøj
- 2014–2018: Copenhagen
- 2018–2019: Brentford

Senior career*
Years	Team	Apps	(Gls)
2019–2022	Brentford	6	(1)
2020–2021	→ Northampton Town (loan)	6	(0)
2022	→ HB Køge (loan)	14	(2)
2022–2023	Sønderjyske	25	(2)
2023–2024	Slaven Belupo	9	(0)
2024	Volos	7	(0)
2024–2025	Rosenborg	14	(0)
2025	→ Lyngby (loan)	5	(0)
2026–	Kauno Žalgiris	6	(0)

International career
2014–2015	Denmark U16	2	(0)
2015–2016	Denmark U17	7	(0)
2016–2017	Denmark U18	3	(0)
2017–2018	Denmark U19	12	(0)
2018–2019	Denmark U20	4	(0)
2020	Denmark U21	1	(0)
- * Club domestic league appearances and goals as of 20:01, 22 July 2026 (UTC)

Luka Racic (born 8 May 1999) is a Danish professional footballer who plays as a centre-back for TOPLYGA club Kauno Žalgiris.

Racic is a graduate of the F.C. Copenhagen academy and began his senior career in England with Brentford in 2018. Following his promotion into the first team squad in 2019, he appeared sparingly before returning to Denmark to join Sønderjyske in 2022. Following short-lived spells with Slaven Belupo and Volos, Racic returned to Scandinavia with Rosenborg in 2024. After 18 months as a fringe player, he transferred to Lithuanian club Kauno Žalgiris in 2026. Racic represented Denmark at youth level.

== Club career ==
=== F.C. Copenhagen ===
A central defender, Racic began his youth career with Rosenhøj. He transferred to the F.C. Copenhagen academy in 2014 and was an unused substitute during two first team matches in the 2016–17 season. (Note: Luka Racic at Soccerway. Retrieved 17 December 2019.) He departed the Parken Stadium in July 2018.

=== Brentford ===
On 5 July 2018, Racic moved to England to join the B team at Championship club Brentford on a two-year contract, with the option of a further year. He was a part of the B team's 2019 Middlesex Senior Cup-winning squad and injuries in the first team squad allowed him to make two late-season first team appearances. In October 2019, Racic signed a new four-year contract and was promoted into the first team squad. He finished the 2019–20 season with seven appearances and one goal, but he did not feature during Brentford's unsuccessful playoff campaign.

Down the central defensive pecking order, Racic joined newly promoted League One club Northampton Town on a loan for the duration of the 2020–21 season. He made 10 appearances before a back injury led to the termination of the loan in January 2021. Racic returned to match play with the B team in mid-April, but he did not win a call into a matchday squad before the end of Brentford's promotion-winning season. Despite being named in Brentford's 25-man Premier League squad for the first half of the 2021–22 season, Racic played exclusively for the B team during the first half of the campaign. He joined Danish 1st Division club HB Køge on loan in January 2022 and made 14 appearances (scoring two goals) during the remainder of the 2021–22 season.

Returning to the Community Stadium for the 2022–23 pre-season, Racic made a first team friendly appearance, but was not given a squad number ahead of the start of the regular season. He departed the club following the cancellation of his contract on 1 September 2022. Racic made 9 appearances and scored one goal during four years with Brentford.

=== Sønderjyske ===
On 1 September 2022, Racic transferred to Danish 1st Division club Sønderjyske for an undisclosed fee and signed a contract running until the end of the 2022–23 season. He made 27 appearances and scored two goals during a 2022–23 season in which the club narrowly missed promotion back to the Superliga. Racic was unable to agree to a contract extension and departed the club when his contract expired.

=== Slaven Belupo ===
On 26 June 2023, Racic signed a two-year contract with Croatian League club Slaven Belupo. He made 11 appearances prior to the termination of his contract by mutual consent on 9 January 2024.

=== Volos ===
On 9 January 2024, Racic signed an undisclosed-length contract with Super League Greece club Volos. He made just seven appearances during the remainder of the 2023–24 season, in which the club narrowly avoided relegation. In June 2024, it was reported that Racic had negotiated with the club to make himself available on a free transfer during the off-season transfer window.

=== Rosenborg ===
On 13 August 2024, Racic signed an 18-month contract with Norwegian Eliteserien club Rosenborg on a free transfer. He made seven appearances during the remainder of the 2024 season. Racic made 9 appearances during the first half of the 2025 season, before suffering a calf injury. Racic made just 11 appearances during the first half of the 2025 season and then played the remainder of his contract on loan at Danish 1st Division club Lyngby, for whom he made five appearances.

=== Kauno Žalgiris ===
On 11 February 2026, Racic signed an undisclosed-length contract with Lithuanian TOPLYGA club Kauno Žalgiris. Five days later, he was an unused substitute in the 2026 Lithuanian Supercup victory over FK Panevėžys.

== International career ==
Racic was capped by Denmark between U16 and U21 level. (Note: Luka Racic national team profile at the Danish Football Association (in Danish)) He was a part of the Danish 2016 UEFA European U17 Championship squad and made three appearances at the tournament.

== Personal life ==
Racic is of Montenegrin descent and his uncle's brother is goalkeeper Filip Đukić.

== Career statistics ==
As of match played 21 July 2026

Appearances and goals by club, season and competition
Club	Season	League			National cup (Note: Includes Danish Cup, FA Cup, Croatian Cup, Greek Cup, Norwegian Cup, Lithuanian Cup)		League cup (Note: Includes EFL Cup)		Europe		Other		Total	
Club	Season	Division	Apps	Goals	Apps	Goals	Apps	Goals	Apps	Goals	Apps	Goals	Apps	Goals
F.C. Copenhagen	2016–17	Danish Superliga	0	0	0	0	—		0	0	—		0	0
Brentford	2018–19	Championship	2	0	0	0	0	0	—		—		2	0
Brentford	2019–20	Championship	4	1	2	0	1	0	—		0	0	7	1
Brentford	Total		6	1	2	0	1	0	—		0	0	9	1
Northampton Town (loan)	2020–21	League One	6	0	1	0	2	0	—		1 (Note: Appearance in EFL Trophy)	0	10	0
HB Køge (loan)	2021–22	Danish 1st Division	14	2	—		—		—		—		14	2
Sønderjyske	2022–23	Danish 1st Division	25	2	2	0	—		—		—		27	2
Slaven Belupo	2023–24	Croatian League	9	0	2	0	—		—		—		11	0
Volos	2023–24	Super League Greece	7	0	1	0	—		—		—		8	0
Rosenborg	2024 (Note: Luka Racic at the Norwegian Football Federation (in Norwegian))	Eliteserien	7	0	—		—		—		—		7	0
Rosenborg	2025	Eliteserien	7	0	4	0	—		1 (Note: Appearance(s) in UEFA Champions League)	0	—		12	0
Rosenborg	Total		14	0	4	0	—		1	0	—		19	0
Lyngby (loan)	2025–26	Danish 1st Division	5	0	0	0	—		—		—		5	0
Kauno Žalgiris	2026	TOPLYGA	6	0	1	1	—		2	0	0	0	9	1
Career total			92	5	13	1	3	0	3	0	1	0	112	6

== Honours ==
Brentford B

- Middlesex Senior Cup: 2018–19

Kauno Žalgiris

- Toplyga: 2026
- Lithuanian Cup: 2026
- Lithuanian Supercup: 2026
