= Noah Holm =

Norwegian footballer (born 2001)

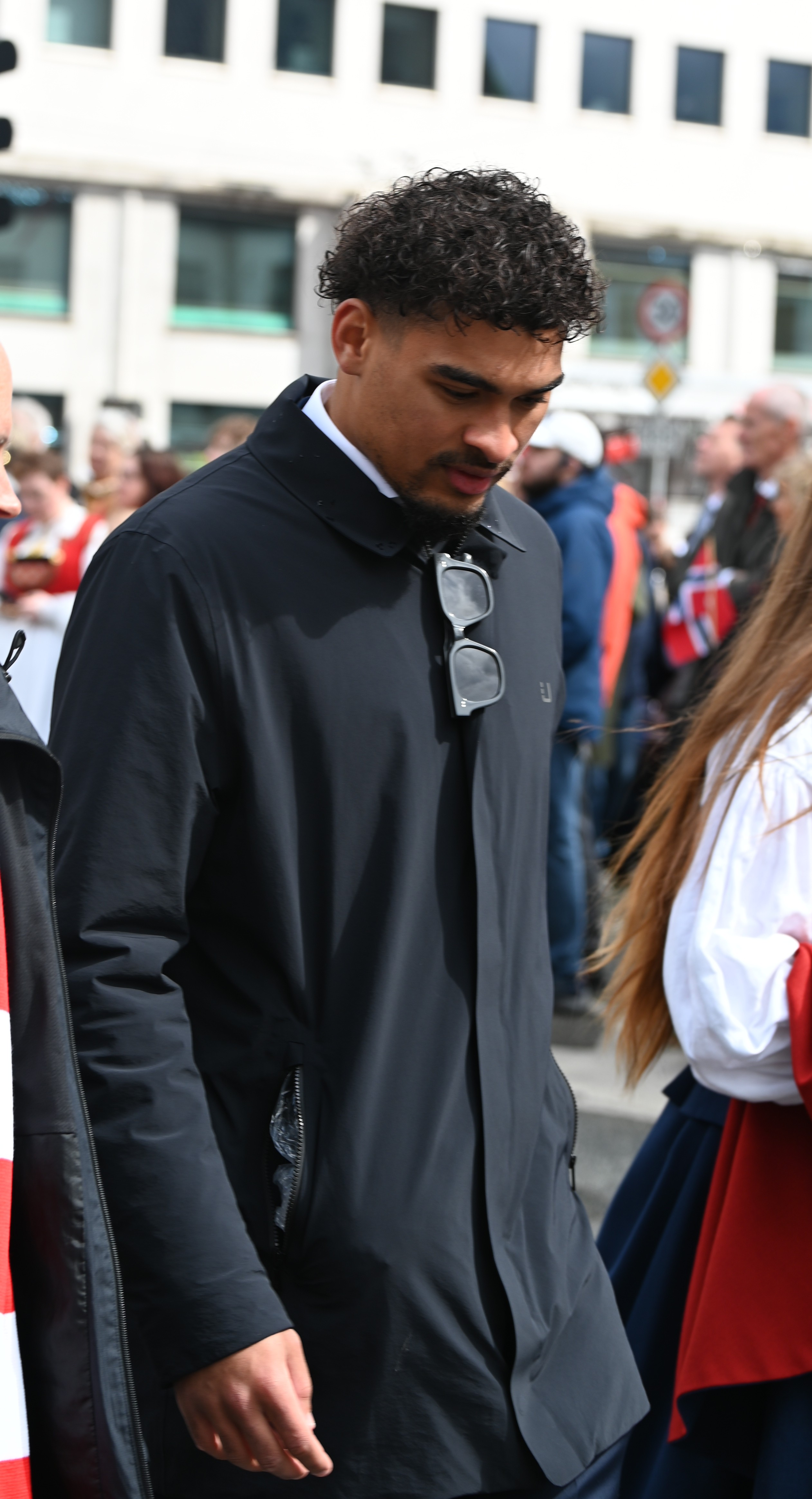

Personal information
- Full name: Noah Emmanuel Jean Holm
- Date of birth: 23 May 2001 (age 25)
- Place of birth: Copenhagen, Denmark
- Height: 1.86 m (6 ft 1 in)
- Position: Forward

Team information
- Current team: Brann
- Number: 29

Youth career
- Løv-Ham
- Fyllingsdalen
- –2017: Strømsgodset
- 2017–2020: RB Leipzig

Senior career*
Years	Team	Apps	(Gls)
2020–2021	Vitória Guimarães	16	(0)
2021–2025	Rosenborg	62	(9)
2022–2023	→ Reims (loan)	8	(0)
2025–	Brann	35	(10)

International career^{‡}
2016	Norway U15	3	(2)
2017	Norway U16	8	(2)
2018	Norway U17	12	(5)
2019	Norway U18	11	(7)
2019	Norway U19	3	(0)
2019–2022	Norway U21	14	(5)
- * Club domestic league appearances and goals as of 22 November 2026 ‡ National team caps and goals as of 23 November 2022

Noah Emmanuel Jean Holm (born 23 May 2001) is a professional footballer who plays as a forward for Eliteserien club Brann. Born in Denmark, he has represented Norway internationally at various youth levels.

== Club career ==
On 1 September 2022, Holm joined Ligue 1 club Reims on loan from Rosenborg for the duration of the 2022–23 season.

On 13 April 2025, Holm scored seven goals in an 11–1 win over fifth division side Rindal in the first round of the Norwegian Cup.

== Personal life ==
Holm is the son of the Danish former footballer, David Nielsen. He is of Danish and Congolese Malagasy descent through his father and his mother. Eligible for his father's nation Denmark, Holm nonetheless chose to be a Norway youth international.

== Career statistics ==
As of match played 22 November 2026

Appearances and goals by club, season and competition
Club	Season	League			National cup (Note: Includes Norwegian Football Cup, Coupe de France)		Europe		Total	
Club	Season	Division	Apps	Goals	Apps	Goals	Apps	Goals	Apps	Goals
Vitória Guimarães	2020–21	Primeira Liga	16	0	0	0	–		16	0
Rosenborg	2021	Eliteserien	15	3	2	0	4 (Note: Appearances in UEFA Europa Conference League)	2	21	5
Rosenborg	2022	Eliteserien	11	1	0	0	–		11	1
Rosenborg	2023	Eliteserien	2	0	0	0	–		2	0
Rosenborg	2024	Eliteserien	17	4	0	0	–		17	4
Rosenborg	2025	Eliteserien	17	1	5	10	4	1	26	12
Rosenborg	Total		62	9	7	10	8	3	77	22
Reims (loan)	2022–23	Ligue 1	8	0	1	0	–		9	0
Brann	2025	Eliteserien	9	1	1	0	5 (Note: Appearances in UEFA Europa League)	1	15	2
Brann	2026	Eliteserien	26	9	7	1	12 (Note: Four appearances and one goal in UEFA Europa League, eight appearances and six goals in UEFA Conference League)	7	45	17
Brann	Total		35	10	8	1	17	8	60	19
Career total			121	19	16	11	25	11	162	41

== Honours ==
Individual

- Eliteserien Young Player of the Month: September 2021
- Norwegian Football Cup top scorer: 2025
