= Rasmus Sandberg =

Norwegian footballer (born 2001)

Personal information
- Full name: Rasmus Semundseth Sandberg
- Date of birth: 23 April 2001 (age 25)
- Place of birth: Trondheim, Norway
- Height: 1.87 m (6 ft 2 in)
- Position: Goalkeeper

Team information
- Current team: Rosenborg
- Number: 12

Youth career
- –2015: Nidelv
- 2016–2019: Rosenborg

Senior career*
Years	Team	Apps	(Gls)
2017–2019	Rosenborg 2	30	(0)
2019–2021	Rosenborg	0	(0)
2021–2023	Stjørdals-Blink	36	(0)
2021–2022	Stjørdals-Blink 2	6	(0)
2024–	Rosenborg	1	(0)
2024	Rosenborg 2	3	(0)

International career^{‡}
2017	Norway U16	4	(0)
2018	Norway U17	11	(0)
2019	Norway U18	9	(0)
- * Club domestic league appearances and goals as of 30 March 2026 ‡ National team caps and goals as of 30 March 2026

Rasmus Semundseth Sandberg (born 23 April 2001) is a Norwegian footballer who plays as a goalkeeper for Norwegian club Rosenborg.

== Club career ==
Hailing from Nidelv's youth setup, Sandberg moved to Rosenborg in 2016, aged fifteen. In 2017, he got his first game for the clubs' second team, and by 2018 he was playing regularly for the team. In the summer of 2018, Sandberg signed his first professional contract with Rosenborg, before becoming a part of the first team squad from the 2019 season.

In March 2021 Sandberg signed for Stjørdals-Blink, after falling behind as the third choice goalkeeper for Rosenborg. The first two seasons saw Sandberg try his luck in the Norwegian First Division, but injuries ruined much of the first two years at the club. His breakthrough at the club came in the 2023 season, after the club had been relegated to the Norwegian Second Division the year prior. The season saw Sandberg play twenty games in the league while also being named the new captain for the season.

At the end of the 2023 season, after three years at Stjørdals-Blink, Rosenborg announced that they had signed Sandberg back ahead of the 2024 season. Sandberg signed a four-year contract that would keep him at the club until the end of the 2027 season. As Rosenborg's first choice goalkeeper Sander Tangvik was suspended for the first league game of the season, Sandberg got his first appearance for the first team, in a game against Sandefjord. After the game, Tangvik was back between the post, and for the next two seasons, Sandberg's only appearances came in the Norwegian Cup.

== International career ==
Sandberg's first international cap came for the Norwegian U16 team in 2017. The next year, Sandberg was selected for the Norwegian U17 squad for the 2018 UEFA European Under-17 Championship in England. Sandberg would play every game for the team that was knocked out in the quarter-finals by England U17.

In May 2023, Sandberg was called up to the Norwegian U21 team ahead of the 2023 UEFA European Under-21 Championship in Georgia and Romania. In an interview with Norwegian newspaper VG, Sandberg claimed he almost fainted when reading the news, and that he considered himself a joker for the tournament. Norway did not progress from the group stages, without an appearance from Sandberg.

== Career statistics ==
As of 28 October 2026

Appearances and goals by club, season and competition
Club	Season	League			National Cup		Other		Total	
Club	Season	Division	Apps	Goals	Apps	Goals	Apps	Goals	Apps	Goals
Rosenborg 2	2017	Norwegian Third Division	1	0	—		—		1	0
Rosenborg 2	2018	Norwegian Third Division	13	0	—		—		13	0
Rosenborg 2	2019	Norwegian Third Division	16	0	—		—		16	0
Rosenborg 2	Total		30	0	—		—		30	0
Rosenborg	2019	Eliteserien	0	0	0	0	—		0	0
Rosenborg	2020	Eliteserien	0	0	—		—		0	0
Rosenborg	Total		0	0	0	0	—		0	0
Stjørdals-Blink	2021	Norwegian First Division	7	0	0	0	2 (Note: Appearances in Norwegian First Division relegation play-offs)	0	9	0
Stjørdals-Blink	2022	Norwegian First Division	9	0	0	0	—		9	0
Stjørdals-Blink	2023	Norwegian Second Division	20	0	3	0	—		23	0
Stjørdals-Blink	Total		36	0	3	0	2	0	41	0
Stjørdals-Blink 2	2021	Norwegian Fourth Division	5	0	—		—		5	0
Stjørdals-Blink 2	2022	Norwegian Fourth Division	1	0	—		—		1	0
Stjørdals-Blink 2	Total		6	0	—		—		6	0
Rosenborg	2024	Eliteserien	1	0	1	0	—		2	0
Rosenborg	2025	Eliteserien	0	0	2	0	—		2	0
Rosenborg	2026	Eliteserien	0	0	3	0	0	0	3	0
Rosenborg	Total		1	0	6	0	0	0	7	0
Rosenborg 2	2024	Norwegian Third Division	3	0	—		—		3	0
Career total			37	0	9	0	2	0	48	0
