= Santeri Väänänen =

Finnish footballer (born 2002)

Personal information
- Full name: Santeri Leevi Oliver Väänänen
- Date of birth: 1 January 2002 (age 24)
- Place of birth: Helsinki, Finland
- Height: 1.77 m (5 ft 10 in)
- Position: Midfielder

Team information
- Current team: Karlsruher SC
- Number: 6

Youth career
- PPV
- HJK

Senior career*
| Years | Team | Apps | (Gls) |
| 2018–2021 | Klubi 04 | 22 | (1) |
| 2018–2022 | HJK | 41 | (1) |
| 2023–2026 | Rosenborg | 71 | (2) |
| 2026– | Karlsruher SC | 0 | (0) |

International career^{‡}
| 2019 | Finland U17 | 6 | (0) |
| 2019 | Finland U19 | 2 | (0) |
| 2021–2025 | Finland U21 | 24 | (1) |
| 2023– | Finland | 10 | (0) |
- * Club domestic league appearances and goals as of 18 July 2026 ‡ National team caps and goals as of 15 November 2026

Santeri Leevi Oliver Väänänen (born 1 January 2002) is a Finnish professional football player who plays as a midfielder for 2. Bundesliga club Karlsruher SC and the Finland national team.

== Club career ==
=== HJK ===
Väänänen started to play football with Pajamäen Pallo-Veikot (PPV) in Pajamäki, Helsinki. Later he joined the youth sector of HJK Helsinki at the age of 7, and played with the club's district youth team in Munkkiniemi along with Matti Peltola.

In 2018, Väänänen made his senior debut with the club's reserve team Klubi 04 in the second-tier league Ykkönen. Later in the same year he debuted with the first team in Veikkausliiga, aged 16.

On 17 June 2019, Väänänen renewed his contract with HJK, on a deal until the end of 2021. During the next seasons, he played occasionally in the starting line-up in the league, but his major breakthrough was delayed until the 2022 season due to injuries.

Väänänen also represented HJK in the 2021–22 UEFA Europa Conference League and in the 2022–23 UEFA Europa League group stages.

=== Rosenborg ===
On 7 December 2022, Norwegian Eliteserien side Rosenborg announced the signing of Väänänen on a four-year deal. The transfer was effective starting in January 2023. He made his debut with Rosenborg on 12 March 2023, as a substitute in a 2–0 Norwegian Cup defeat against Viking. He scored his first goal in Eliteserien on 2 June 2024, in a 1–1 draw against Fredrikstad. In late September 2024, Väänänen suffered a knee injury and was estimated to miss 2–3 months.

=== Karlsruher SC ===
On 22 July 2026, Väänänen signed with Karlsruher SC in German 2. Bundesliga.

== International career ==
Väänänen has represented Finland at various youth levels. He captains the Finland under-21 national team in the 2025 UEFA Euro U21 Championship qualifiers.

He made his international debut with the Finland senior national team in January 2023, in the friendly matches against Sweden and Estonia.

== Career statistics ==
=== Club ===
As of 18 July 2026

Appearances and goals by club, season and competition
| Club | Season | League | | | National cup (Note: Includes Finnish Cup, Norwegian Cup) | | League cup (Note: Includes Finnish League Cup) | | Europe | | Total | |
| Club | Season | Division | Apps | Goals | Apps | Goals | Apps | Goals | Apps | Goals | Apps | Goals |
|---|---|---|---|---|---|---|---|---|---|---|---|---|
| Klubi 04 | 2018 | Ykkönen | 16 | 0 | 2 | 0 | — | | — | | 18 | 0 |
| Klubi 04 | 2019 | Kakkonen | 5 | 1 | 0 | 0 | — | | — | | 5 | 1 |
| Klubi 04 | 2020 | Kakkonen | 0 | 0 | 0 | 0 | — | | — | | 0 | 0 |
| Klubi 04 | 2021 | Ykkönen | 1 | 0 | 0 | 0 | — | | — | | 1 | 0 |
| Klubi 04 | Total | | 22 | 1 | 2 | 0 | 0 | 0 | 0 | 0 | 24 | 1 |
| HJK | 2018 | Veikkausliiga | 1 | 0 | 0 | 0 | — | | — | | 1 | 0 |
| HJK | 2019 | Veikkausliiga | 9 | 0 | 1 | 0 | — | | 3 (Note: Appearances in UEFA Champions League) | 0 | 13 | 0 |
| HJK | 2020 | Veikkausliiga | 8 | 0 | 2 | 0 | — | | — | | 10 | 0 |
| HJK | 2021 | Veikkausliiga | 10 | 0 | 4 | 1 | — | | 7 (Note: Appearances in UEFA Europa League and UEFA Europa Conference League) | 0 | 21 | 1 |
| HJK | 2022 | Veikkausliiga | 13 | 1 | 0 | 0 | 2 | 0 | 13 (Note: Appearances in UEFA Champions League and UEFA Europa League) | 0 | 28 | 1 |
| HJK | Total | | 41 | 1 | 7 | 1 | 2 | 0 | 23 | 0 | 73 | 2 |
| Rosenborg | 2023 | Eliteserien | 23 | 0 | 2 | 0 | — | | 3 (Note: Appearances in UEFA Europa Conference League) | 0 | 28 | 0 |
| Rosenborg | 2024 | Eliteserien | 18 | 1 | 2 | 1 | — | | — | | 20 | 2 |
| Rosenborg | 2025 | Eliteserien | 22 | 1 | 4 | 0 | — | | 6 | 0 | 32 | 1 |
| Rosenborg | 2026 | Eliteserien | 8 | 0 | 0 | 0 | — | | — | | 8 | 0 |
| Rosenborg | Total | | 71 | 2 | 8 | 1 | 0 | 0 | 9 | 0 | 88 | 3 |
| Rosenborg 2 | 2023 | 3. divisjon | 4 | 1 | — | | — | | — | | 4 | 1 |
| Karlsruher | 2026–27 | 2. Bundesliga | 0 | 0 | 0 | 0 | — | | — | | 0 | 0 |
| Career total | | | 138 | 5 | 17 | 2 | 2 | 0 | 32 | 0 | 189 | 7 |

=== International ===
As of match played on 15 November 2026

| National team | Year | Competitive | | Friendly | | Total | |
| National team | Year | Apps | Goals | Apps | Goals | Apps | Goals |
|---|---|---|---|---|---|---|---|
| Finland | 2023 | 0 | 0 | 2 | 0 | 2 | 0 |
| Finland | 2024 | 0 | 0 | 0 | 0 | 0 | 0 |
| Finland | 2025 | 2 (Note: Appearances in the 2026 FIFA World Cup qualification.) | 0 | 1 | 0 | 3 | 0 |
| Finland | 2026 | 4 (Note: Appearances in the 2026–27 UEFA Nations League C.) | 0 | 1 | 0 | 5 | 0 |
| Total | | 6 | 0 | 4 | 0 | 10 | 0 |

== Honours ==
HJK

- Veikkausliiga: 2020, 2021, 2022
- Finnish Cup runner-up: 2021
