= Noah Sahsah =

Danish footballer (born 2005)

Personal information
- Full name: Noah Donovan Sahsah
- Date of birth: 8 July 2005 (age 21)
- Place of birth: Copenhagen, Denmark
- Height: 1.73 m (5 ft 8 in)
- Position: Winger

Team information
- Current team: Rosenborg
- Number: 11

Youth career
- 2011–2021: Copenhagen

Senior career*
Years	Team	Apps	(Gls)
2021–2025	Copenhagen	0	(0)
2024	→ Rosenborg (loan)	7	(1)
2025–	Rosenborg	21	(6)

International career^{‡}
2021	Denmark U16	2	(0)
2021–2022	Denmark U17	16	(3)
2022–2023	Denmark U18	2	(0)
2023	Denmark U19	2	(0)
- * Club domestic league appearances and goals as of 22 November 2026 ‡ National team caps and goals as of 27 May 2022

Noah Donovan Sahsah (born 8 July 2005) is a Danish professional footballer who plays for as a winger for Eliteserien club Rosenborg.

== Club career ==
=== Copenhagen ===
Having been part of Copenhagen youth system since he was six years old, Noah Sahsah made his professional debut for the first team on 17 March 2022. He replaced Roony Bardghji at the 75th minute of the return Conference League round of 16 game against PSV Eindhoven, a home loss that would see the club eliminated from the competition.

On 3 October 2023, while playing for Copenhagen's under-19 side in the UEFA Youth League, Sahsah suffered a torn cruciate ligament while celebrating his second goal in a 3–2 win over Bayern Munich U19. The injury sidelined him for the remainder of the season.

=== Rosenborg ===
On 6 August 2024, Sahsah joined Norwegian Eliteserien club Rosenborg on loan from Copenhagen, with the move aimed at restoring his match fitness after a knee injury. He featured in seven league games during the remainder of the season, scoring his first goal on 28 October 2024 in a match against Bodø/Glimt.

On 3 December 2024, Rosenborg exercised the purchase option included in the loan agreement, making the transfer permanent. He signed a deal until the end of 2028. According to Tipsbladet, Copenhagen retained both a buy-back option and a 25% sell-on clause in any future transfer. Sporting director Sune Smith-Nielsen praised Sahsah's recovery from injury and noted that a return to Parken in future remained possible, while Sahsah himself described leaving as "emotional" but expressed gratitude to the club for supporting his development.

In February 2025, Sahsah sustained a serious knee injury during a friendly against Ranheim, collapsing in pain and leaving the pitch by ambulance. He later told Norwegian newspaper Adresseavisen that the injury was related to his kneecap rather than a torn cruciate ligament, and expressed hope for a quicker recovery than the year-long layoff he had previously experienced at Copenhagen. Following surgery he spent time in Denmark with his family before returning to Trondheim for rehabilitation.

== International career ==
Born in Denmark, Sahsah is of Moroccan descent. He is a youth international with Denmark, taking part in the Euro U17 with his selection in 2022.

== Career statistics ==
As of match played 22 November 2026

Appearances and goals by club, season and competition
Club	Season	League			National cup		Europe		Total	
Club	Season	Division	Apps	Goals	Apps	Goals	Apps	Goals	Apps	Goals
Copenhagen	2021–22	Danish Superliga	0	0	0	0	1 (Note: Appearances in UEFA Conference League)	0	1	0
Copenhagen	2022–23	Danish Superliga	0	0	1	0	—		1	0
Copenhagen	2023–24	Danish Superliga	0	0	1	1	—		1	1
Copenhagen	Total		0	0	2	1	1	0	3	1
Rosenborg (loan)	2024	Eliteserien	7	1	0	0	—		7	1
Rosenborg	2025	Eliteserien	0	0	0	0	0	0	0	0
Rosenborg	2026	Eliteserien	21	6	3	1	—		24	7
Rosenborg	Total		28	7	3	1	0	0	31	8
Career total			28	7	5	2	1	0	34	9
