= Ulrik Yttergård Jenssen =

Norwegian footballer (born 1996)

Ulrik Jenssen
Personal information
- Full name: Ulrik Yttergård Jenssen
- Date of birth: 17 July 1996 (age 30)
- Place of birth: Tromsø, Norway
- Height: 1.86 m (6 ft 1 in)
- Position: Centre-back

Team information
- Current team: OB
- Number: 5

Youth career
- Fløya
- Tromsø
- 2013–2016: Lyon

Senior career*
Years	Team	Apps	(Gls)
2012	Tromsø 2	20	(0)
2013–2016	Lyon II	48	(1)
2016–2017	Tromsø	39	(2)
2018–2021	Nordsjælland	108	(8)
2021–2022	Willem II	23	(0)
2022	Nordsjælland	2	(0)
2023–2026	Rosenborg	79	(5)
2026	→ Lillestrøm (loan)	10	(0)
2026–	OB	6	(0)

International career^{‡}
2011	Norway U15	4	(0)
2012	Norway U16	10	(0)
2013	Norway U17	12	(1)
2014	Norway U18	7	(0)
2014–2015	Norway U19	6	(0)
2015–2018	Norway U21	26	(0)
- * Club domestic league appearances and goals as of 31 August 2026 ‡ National team caps and goals as of 9 February 2024

Ulrik Yttergård Jenssen (born 17 July 1996) is a Norwegian professional footballer who plays as a centre-back for Danish Superliga club OB.

== Club career ==
On 4 August 2016, Jenssen transferred from Lyon II to sign a three-and-a-half-year with Tromsø.

After joining FC Nordsjælland in January 2018, Jensen left the club again in the summer 2021.

In July 2021, Jenssen signed a three-year contract with Eredivisie club Willem II. His contract was terminated by mutual consent on 20 June 2022, after the club had suffered relegation.

Jenssen returned to Nordsjælland on 19 August 2022, signing a contract until December 2022.

In November 2022, Jenssen signed for Rosenborg, joining the club from January 2023.

Ahead of the 2026 season, Jenssen was loaned out to newly promoted Lillestrøm on a short-term loan for the first half of the season.

== International career ==
In 2016, he was called up to the Norway national football team despite not having played a senior first-team match for any club.

== Personal life ==
Born in Tromsø, Jenssen is the son of former Tromsø and Sogndal manager Truls Jenssen. His older brother is the footballer Ruben Yttergård Jenssen.

== Career statistics ==
As of 31 August 2026

Appearances and goals by club, season and competition
Club	Season	League			National Cup (Note: Appearances in Norwegian Football Cup, Danish Cup, and KNVB Beker)		Continental		Total	
Club	Season	Division	Apps	Goals	Apps	Goals	Apps	Goals	Apps	Goals
Tromsø 2	2012	2. divisjon	20	0	—		—		20	0
Lyon II	2013–14	CFA	12	0	—		—		12	0
Lyon II	2014–15	CFA	20	1	—		—		20	1
Lyon II	2015–16	CFA	16	0	—		—		16	0
Lyon II	Total		48	1	—		—		48	1
Tromsø	2016	Eliteserien	12	1	1	0	—		13	1
Tromsø	2017	Eliteserien	27	1	3	0	—		30	1
Tromsø	Total		39	2	4	0	—		43	2
Nordsjælland	2017–18	Danish Superliga	17	0	0	0	—		17	0
Nordsjælland	2018–19	Danish Superliga	31	4	2	0	3 (Note: Appearances in the UEFA Europa League)	0	36	4
Nordsjælland	2019–20	Danish Superliga	32	1	1	1	—		33	2
Nordsjælland	2020–21	Danish Superliga	28	3	0	0	—		28	3
Nordsjælland	Total		108	8	3	1	3	0	114	9
Willem II	2021–22	Eredivisie	23	0	1	0	—		24	0
Nordsjælland	2022–23	Danish Superliga	2	0	1	0	—		3	0
Rosenborg	2023	Eliteserien	27	2	3	0	4 (Note: Appearances in UEFA Conference League)	0	34	2
Rosenborg	2024	Eliteserien	27	1	3	0	—		30	1
Rosenborg	2025	Eliteserien	25	2	3	1	5	0	33	3
Rosenborg	Total		79	5	9	1	9	0	97	6
Lillestrøm (loan)	2026	Eliteserien	10	0	1	0	0	0	11	0
OB	2026–27	Danish Superliga	6	0	1	0	—		7	0
Career total			335	16	20	2	12	0	367	18
