= Henry Sletsjøe =

Swedish footballer (born 2000)

Personal information
- Full name: Per Henry Karl Sletsjøe
- Date of birth: 27 March 2000 (age 26)
- Height: 1.89 m (6 ft 2 in)
- Position: Midfielder

Team information
- Current team: GAIS
- Number: 10

Youth career
- –2018: Djurgården

Senior career*
Years	Team	Apps	(Gls)
2019	Stocksund	21	(2)
2020	Syrianska	13	(0)
2021	Sylvia	26	(2)
2022–2024	Brage	79	(3)
2025	Rosenborg	5	(0)
2025	→ Kristiansund (loan)	12	(0)
2026–	GAIS	6	(1)
- * Club domestic league appearances and goals as of 8 July 2026

Henry Sletsjøe (born 27 March 2000) is a Swedish footballer who plays as a midfielder for GAIS.

== Career ==
He started his career in Djurgårdens IF, last playing for them in the P19 and U21 Allsvenskan in the summer of 2018. This was followed by three one-year spells in IFK Stocksund, Syrianska FC and IF Sylvia. In 2022 he moved north to Borlänge and the club IK Brage.

With TV 2 having written already in September 2024 that Sletsjøe would leave Brage for Norwegian European contenders Rosenborg BK, it became official in November 2024. He made his Eliteserien debut in June 2025.

Lacking regular play in Rosenborg, Sletsjøe was loaned out to Kristiansund BK in August 2025 with an option to buy. Sletsjøe was a regular in Kristiansund, and was welcoming towards being bought out of his Rosenborg contract. However, the club also posted a clip where Sletsjøe seemingly praised Kristiansund and criticized Rosenborg; the player claiming that his quote was "taken out of context".

== Personal life ==
Sletsjøe has a Norwegian surname, owing to his Swedish mother and Norwegian father.
