= Markus Henriksen =

Norwegian footballer (born 1992)

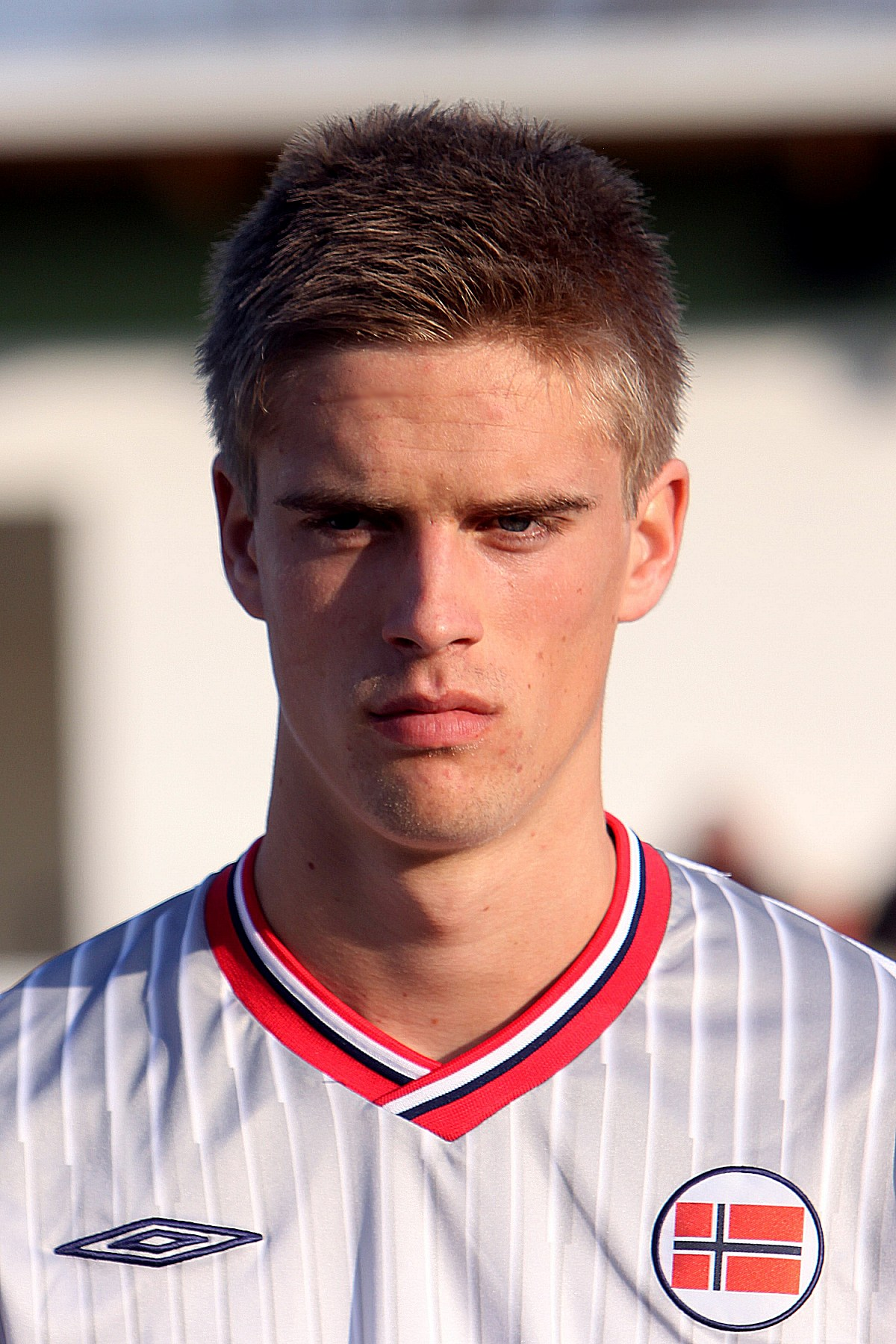
- Henriksen with Norway U21 in 2011

Personal information
- Full name: Markus Henriksen
- Date of birth: 25 July 1992 (age 34)
- Place of birth: Trondheim, Norway
- Height: 1.87 m (6 ft 2 in)
- Positions: Defender; midfielder

Youth career
- Trond IL
- Rosenborg

Senior career*
Years	Team	Apps	(Gls)
2009–2012	Rosenborg	78	(11)
2012–2017	AZ Alkmaar	108	(26)
2016–2017	→ Hull City (loan)	11	(0)
2017–2020	Hull City	74	(4)
2020	→ Bristol City (loan)	4	(0)
2020–2024	Rosenborg	73	(3)

International career^{‡}
2007	Norway U15	4	(1)
2008	Norway U16	13	(4)
2009	Norway U17	10	(0)
2009–2010	Norway U18	6	(2)
2010–2011	Norway U19	9	(1)
2010–2013	Norway U21	10	(2)
2011	Norway U23	2	(0)
2010–2020	Norway	58	(3)
- * Club domestic league appearances and goals as of 20 October 2024 ‡ National team caps and goals as of 05:51, 26 November 2020 (UTC)

Markus Henriksen (born 25 July 1992) is a former Norwegian professional footballer who plays as a midfielder. He last played for Eliteserien club Rosenborg.

== Club career ==
=== Rosenborg ===
Henriksen moved from Trond IL to Rosenborg as a boy. He proved himself early on as an exciting midfielder, showing traits of footballing intelligence, basic skill and excellent endurance.

==== 2009 ====
Henriksen made his Rosenborg debut in a cup game against Gjøvik-Lyn on 10 May 2009, coming on for Alexander Tettey in the 86th minute. His Tippeligaen debut came later that year when he was a late substitute for Trond Olsen against Sandefjord on 20 September 2009. Despite aggregating little over half an hour of football that season, he played the three games necessary to gain a 2009 Tippeligaen medal at the age of just 17 years.

==== 2010 ====
In 2010, Henriksen became a regular fixture in the Rosenborg side under Erik Hamrén and continued to do so when Nils Arne Eggen replaced the outgoing Hamrén. He played in 28 of a possible 30 games, 26 appearances as a first team starter.

He scored his first professional goals against Odd Grenland on 11 April 2010 where his brace inspired Rosenborg to a 3–1 comeback. On 21 July 2010, Henriksen's first goal in Europe culminated Linfield to a 2–0 loss in the Champions League second qualifying round.

Scouts from Werder Bremen attended the match to watch Henriksen, but Rosenborg's sporting director, Erik Hoftun rebutted any links by stating that Henriksen will continue his development at Rosenborg. Henriksen put an end to any speculation on 6 August 2010 when he extended his contract till the end of 2013. His agent, Andreas Ekker admitted that "Markus could have gone to a bigger club by now, but we think it's best for Markus to stay at RBK."

He went on to score two more goals in Champions League qualifying that year and scored once more against Atlético Madrid in the Europa League group stages on 4 November 2010.

His excellent season, in which he helped Rosenborg to an unbeaten league title, was rewarded with numerous awards including NISO Young Male Player of the Year and Statoil's Talent Prize 2010. Don Balón named Henriksen on their list of the 100 best young players in the world in 2010, where he joined the likes of compatriot Harmeet Singh, Mario Götze, Eden Hazard, Neymar and Theo Walcott.

==== 2011 ====
With the sale of Anthony Annan to Schalke before the start of the 2011 season, Henriksen was asked to play a more defensive role beside the similarly attack-minded Per Ciljan Skjelbred. After three games, in which Rosenborg conceded ten goals, Jan Jönsson aborted plans on making Henriksen a defensive midfielder and brought in Fredrik Winsnes to play alongside him. Henriksen returning to his favoured box-to-box role instantly saw Rosenborg win 2–0 in back-to-back games. However, it was only until Rosenborg finally replaced Annan with Mohammed-Awal Issah in August that Henriksen could make the attacking effect he had shown possible the season prior; in Issah's first six games for Rosenborg, Henriksen scored five goals and assisted a further two. On Issah's arrival, Henriksen told TV 2 Sport, "I'm beginning to become more offensive and I've brought more to each game since Issah has arrived."

On 21 September of that year, the Daily Mirror reported that Aston Villa were interested in Henriksen whilst Napoli had also been known to have scouted him. Henriksen furthered speculation linking him abroad in a November interview with Aftenposten, "I want to try and show that I am good enough to play elsewhere than in Norway. I think I'd best fit Germany, so it is my dream to play in a good team in the Bundesliga."

==== 2012 ====
Late on 27 January 2012, Henriksen left Rosenborg's training camp in Benidorm for Belgium to complete a €2 million move to Club Brugge. Rosenborg cited economic reasons as to why the offer was accepted. The next day, however, Henriksen confirmed on his personal Twitter account that he had turned down a move to Club Brugge by stating, "Congratulations boys for the win. Looking forward to Benidorm. Turned down Brugge because of my gut feeling and the total package."

For Henriksen this would be his last season at the club. In March 2012 he played in the league opener against SK Brann and made a further 17 out of 19 appearances, scoring one goal, until he was sold to Dutch club AZ Alkmaar in the region of €2 million.

=== AZ Alkmaar ===
==== 2012–13 ====
On 31 August 2012, Henriksen left Rosenborg for a fee of around €2 million to AZ Alkmaar and signed a five-year contract with the club. He made his debut for AZ on 16 September 2012 when he replaced Maarten Martens after 72 minutes in the 4–0 victory against Roda JC. Henriksen was a first team regular in his debut season in the Eredivisie scoring three and assisting three goals. In the Dutch Cup Henriksen played every minute en route to the final where he provided a crucial assist to Adam Maher to open the scoring in the final, AZ would score just 2 minutes later at De Kuip and win the final and the Cup 2–1 against PSV Eindhoven. Henriksen was named as AZ player of the year this season beating top scorer Jozy Altidore and young sensation Adam Maher.

==== 2013–14 ====
After a great season previously Henriksen started the season as a first team regular but first team places were limited partly due to the arrival of manager Dick Advocaat after Gertjan Verbeek departed and the emergence and form of Celso Ortiz. Henriksen only scored twice and featured half as much as the previous season.

=== Hull City ===
==== 2016–17 ====
On 31 August 2016, he signed for Hull City on loan until January 2017, with a deal which was made permanent. On his Hull debut he assisted the first goal and scored a late winner in a 2–1 EFL Cup win over Stoke City on 21 September 2016. On 6 January 2017, his loan from AZ became permanent when he signed a 2 1/2-year deal. On 30 September 2017, he scored his first goal, after becoming a member of Hull City, when he came off the bench to get the 5th goal in a 6–1 home victory over Birmingham City.

==== 2018–19 ====
On 1 August 2018, Henriksen was named captain for the season.

On 1 March 2019, Henriksen had his contract with the club extended by one year.

On 30 June 2020, Hull indicated that Henriksen would leave the club following the expiry of his contract.

==== Bristol City (loan) ====
On 31 January 2020, Henriksen joined Bristol City on loan until the end of the season. He was allowed to leave on 21 June 2020 to pursue "other options".

=== Rosenborg ===
On 27 September 2020, Henriksen re-joined Rosenborg after eight years.

After captaining the team for his last three seasons, Henriksen announced that he would not renew his contract with Rosenborg after the 2024 season, and that his second stint at the club was over.

Henriksen announced vi Instagram on 28 February 2025 the he is reitiring from football.

== International career ==
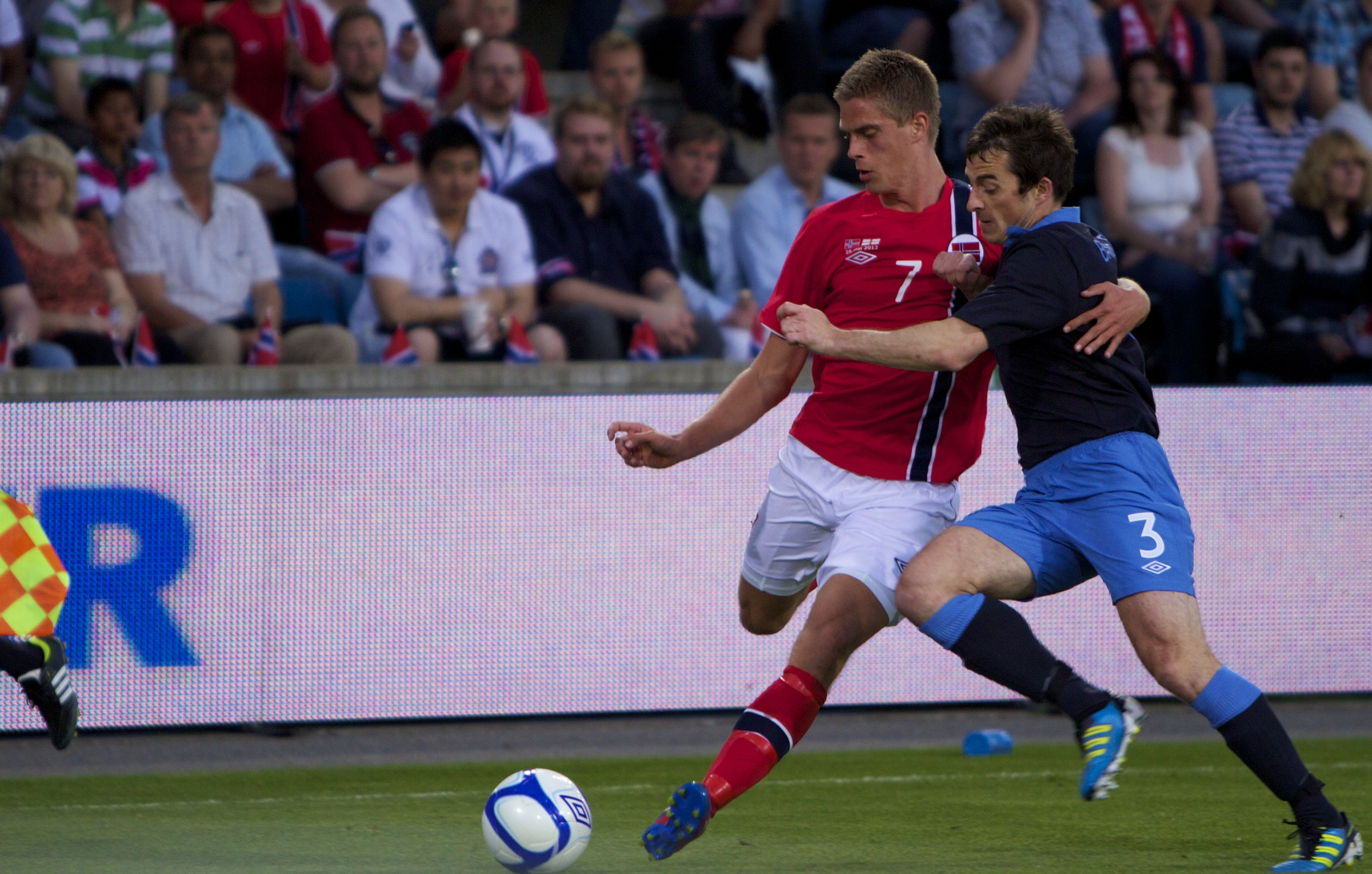
Henriksen (left) playing for Norway against England in May 2012

Henriksen made his Norway under-21 debut against Croatia under-21 on 11 August 2010. He scored Norway's only goal in a 4–1 loss. He has been ever present in Norway's 2013 European Under-21 Championship qualification campaign, scoring once against Azerbaijan under-21 and assisting once against England under-21.

Just over two months after making his Norway under-21 debut, he made his senior debut for the Norwegian national side against the same country; on 12 October 2010, at the age of just 18 years, Henriksen played the first half in an away friendly against Croatia which Norway went on to lose 2–1. His first competitive game came on 4 June 2011 when he was an 83rd minute substitution for Christian Grindheim against Portugal.

On 23 November 2011, Henriksen was called up to play in the 2012 King's Cup in Thailand to run from 15 to 21 January. After an impressive performance against Denmark League XI, Henriksen explained his intentions for the national team, "I'm going to be a leader, both here [with the national side] and at Rosenborg, regardless of age. I am the type of player who likes to take responsibility, both with my football and voice." The national coach Egil Olsen concurred, "It would surprise me if he does not play in the national team over time...I see him in a leadership role, perhaps such is quite possible by the autumn."

Henriksen scored his first goal for the national team in the 2014 World Cup qualifying match against Slovenia. After starting five of the first six matches in the qualifying campaign for the 2014 World Cup, Henriksen was left out of the squad for the matches against Cyprus and Switzerland in September 2013, and instead called up for the under-21 team. Egil "Drillo" Olsen stated that Henriksen's performance in the recent matches was not good enough, and that it would be better for him to play for the under-21 team then to sit on the bench for the senior team.

== Personal life ==
He is the son of the former Rosenborg player and manager, Trond Henriksen.

== Career statistics ==
=== Club ===
As of 20 October 2024.

Appearances and goals by club, season and competition
Club	Season	League			National Cup (Note: Includes Norwegian Cup, KNVB Cup, FA Cup)		League Cup (Note: Includes EFL Cup)		Europe		Other		Total	
Club	Season	Division	Apps	Goals	Apps	Goals	Apps	Goals	Apps	Goals	Apps	Goals	Apps	Goals
Rosenborg	2009	Tippeligaen	3	0	2	0	—		—		—		5	0
Rosenborg	2010	Tippeligaen	28	7	5	3	—		12 (Note: Six appearances and three goals in UEFA Champions League, six appearances and one goal in UEFA Europa League)	4	1 (Note: Appearance in the Superfinalen)	0	46	14
Rosenborg	2011	Tippeligaen	29	3	3	0	—		6 (Note: Four appearances and one goal in UEFA Champions League, two appearances and one goal in UEFA Europa League)	2	—		38	5
Rosenborg	2012	Tippeligaen	18	1	3	3	—		7 (Note: Appearance(s) in UEFA Europa League)	0	—		28	4
Rosenborg	Total		78	11	13	6	—		25	6	1	0	117	23
AZ	2012–13	Eredivisie	29	3	6	0	—		—		—		35	3
AZ	2013–14	Eredivisie	26	2	3	0	—		4	0	5 (Note: One appearance in Johan Cruyff Shield, and four appearances in Eredivisie European playoffs)	0	38	2
AZ	2014–15	Eredivisie	22	7	2	0	—		—		—		24	7
AZ	2015–16	Eredivisie	28	12	4	3	—		9	4	—		41	19
AZ	2016–17	Eredivisie	3	2	0	0	—		4	0	—		7	2
AZ	Total		108	26	15	3	—		17	4	5	0	145	33
Hull City	2016–17	Premier League	15	0	1	0	4	1	—		—		20	1
Hull City	2017–18	Championship	31	2	2	0	0	0	—		—		33	2
Hull City	2018–19	Championship	39	2	0	0	0	0	—		—		39	2
Hull City	Total		85	4	3	0	4	1	—		—		92	5
Bristol City (loan)	2019–20	Championship	4	0	0	0	0	0	—		—		4	0
Rosenborg	2020	Eliteserien	9	0	—		—		1	0	—		10	0
Rosenborg	2021	Eliteserien	9	1	0	0	—		0	0	—		9	1
Rosenborg	2022	Eliteserien	29	0	2	0	—		—		—		31	0
Rosenborg	2023	Eliteserien	13	1	3	0	—		0	0	—		16	1
Rosenborg	2024	Eliteserien	13	1	2	0	—		—		—		15	1
Rosenborg	Total		73	3	7	0	—		1	0	—		81	3
Career total			348	44	38	9	4	1	43	10	6	0	439	64

=== International ===
As of match played on 8 October 2020.

Appearances and goals by national team and year
National team	Year	Apps	Goals
Norway	2010	1	0
Norway	2011	1	0
Norway	2012	12	1
Norway	2013	4	0
Norway	2014	0	0
Norway	2015	6	1
Norway	2016	7	0
Norway	2017	4	1
Norway	2018	10	0
Norway	2019	9	0
Norway	2020	3	0
Total		57	3

Scores and results list Norway's goal tally first, score column indicates score after each Henriksen goal.

List of international goals scored by Markus Henriksen
No.	Date	Venue	Opponent	Score	Result	Competition
1	11 September 2012	Ullevaal Stadion, Oslo	Slovenia	1–1	2–1	2014 FIFA World Cup qualification
2	15 November 2015	Groupama Arena, Budapest	Hungary	1–2	1–2	UEFA Euro 2016 qualification
3	5 October 2017	San Marino Stadium, Serravalle	San Marino	1–0	8–0	2018 FIFA World Cup qualification

== Honours ==
Rosenborg

- Tippeligaen: 2009, 2010
- Norwegian under-19 Championship: 2009
- Superfinalen: 2010

AZ

- KNVB Cup: 2012–13

Norway U21

- UEFA European Under-21 Championship bronze: 2013

Individual

- Statoil's Talentpris: June 2010
- Statoil's Talentpris of the Year: 2010
- NISO Young Male Player of the Year: 2010
