= Moustafa Zeidan =

Palestinian footballer (born 1998)

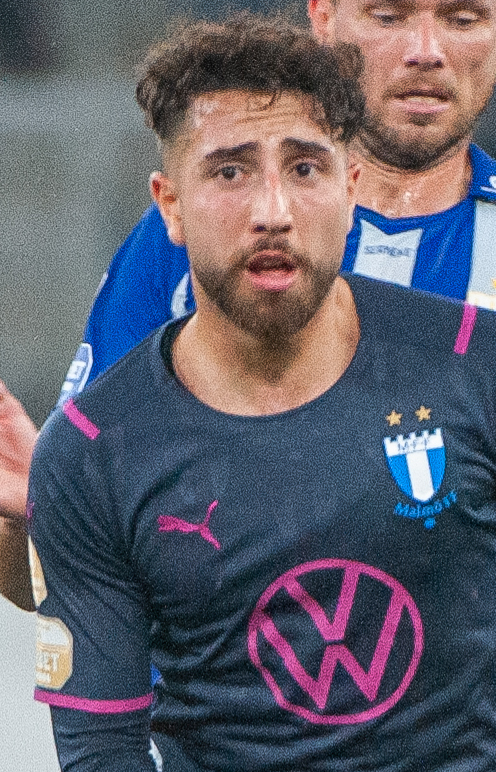
- Zeidan playing for Malmö FF in 2022

Personal information
- Full name: Moustafa Zeidan Khalili
- Date of birth: 7 June 1998 (age 28)
- Place of birth: Helsingborg, Sweden
- Height: 1.75 m (5 ft 9 in)
- Position: Midfielder

Team information
- Current team: Al Masry
- Number: 24

Youth career
- Högaborg
- 2014–2016: Aston Villa

Senior career*
Years	Team	Apps	(Gls)
2013–2014	Högaborg	19	(9)
2016–2017	Helsingborgs IF	3	(0)
2017	Syrianska	13	(1)
2018	Brommapojkarna	15	(0)
2019	Frej	13	(2)
2020–2021	Jönköpings Södra	38	(5)
2021–2022	Sirius	28	(4)
2022–2025	Malmö FF	23	(3)
2023–2024	→ Hatta (loan)	4	(1)
2024–2025	→ Rosenborg (loan)	31	(1)
2026–	Al Masry	2	(0)

International career^{‡}
2013–2015	Sweden U17	17	(4)
2015–2017	Sweden U19	3	(0)
2023	Sweden	2	(0)
2024–	Palestine	8	(0)
- * Club domestic league appearances and goals as of 22 November 2025 ‡ National team caps and goals as of 4 December 2025

Moustafa Zeidan Khalili (Arabic: مصطفى زيدان خليلي; born 7 June 1998) is a professional footballer who plays as a midfielder. Born in Sweden, he plays for the Palestine national team.

He is a product of the Högaborg and Aston Villa academies.

== Club career ==
On 3 December 2019, Jönköpings Södra confirmed that Zeidan would join the club for the 2020 season, signing a two-year deal.

== International career ==
=== Sweden ===
In December 2021, Zeidan was selected for the Swedish national team's January tour, which was to be played in Portugal. The tour was later canceled. He was later called up again in December 2022. He made his full international debut for Sweden on 9 January 2023, playing for 68 minutes in a friendly 2–0 win against Finland before being replaced by Bilal Hussein.

=== Palestine ===
In June 2024, Zeidan was called up to the Palestine national team for the World Cup qualification games against Lebanon and Australia.

== Personal life ==
Zeidan was born in Sweden and is of Palestinian descent. He is the cousin of the footballers Imad and Abdul Khalili.

== Career statistics ==
=== International ===
As of match played 4 December 2025

Appearances and goals by national team and year
National team	Year	Apps	Goals
Sweden	2023	2	0
Sweden	Total	2	0
Palestine	2024	5	0
Palestine	2025	3	0
Palestine	Total	8	0
Career total		10	0

== Honours ==
Malmö FF

- Allsvenskan: 2023

Al Masry

- Egyptian League Cup: 2025–26
