= Magnus Holte =

Norwegian footballer (born 2006)

Personal information
- Date of birth: 27 March 2006 (age 20)
- Place of birth: Ler, Norway
- Height: 1.93 m (6 ft 4 in)
- Position: Striker

Team information
- Current team: Levanger
- Number: 21

Youth career
- –2021: Nardo
- 2021–2023: Rosenborg

Senior career*
| Years | Team | Apps | (Gls) |
| 2022– | Rosenborg | 11 | (1) |
| 2025 | → Hødd (loan) | 19 | (1) |
| 2026 | → Norrby (loan) | 8 | (0) |
| 2026– | → Levanger (loan) | 11 | (3) |

International career^{‡}
| 2023 | Norway U17 | 5 | (1) |
| 2024 | Norway U18 | 3 | (0) |
| 2025– | Norway U19 | 2 | (0) |
| 2025– | Norway U20 | 5 | (0) |
- * Club domestic league appearances and goals as of 31 October 2026 ‡ National team caps and goals as of 13 October 2025

Magnus Holte (born 27 March 2006) is a Norwegian footballer who plays for Norwegian club Levanger, on loan from Rosenborg.

== Club career ==
Holte signed for Rosenborg from Nardo in 2021. In August 2022 he signed his first professional contract. On 18 September 2022, Holte made his league debut in a 3–1 win over Lillestrøm coming on as a substitute. Doing so he became the youngest player to play for Rosenborg in a league match with 16 years and 175 days, beating the record of John Hou Sæter. A record that under 2 months later was broken by his teammate Sverre Nypan.

On 6 August 2023, he scored his first goal for Rosenborg when he secured a 2–1 away win in a league match against Haugesund.

== Career statistics ==
=== Club ===
As of 31 October 2026

Appearances and goals by club, season and competition
| Club | Season | Division | League | | Cup | | Continental | | Other | | Total | |
| Club | Season | Division | Apps | Goals | Apps | Goals | Apps | Goals | Apps | Goals | Apps | Goals |
|---|---|---|---|---|---|---|---|---|---|---|---|---|
| Rosenborg | 2022 | Eliteserien | 1 | 0 | 0 | 0 | 0 | 0 | 0 | 0 | 1 | 0 |
| Rosenborg | 2023 | Eliteserien | 3 | 1 | 0 | 0 | 2 | 0 | 0 | 0 | 5 | 1 |
| Rosenborg | 2024 | Eliteserien | 7 | 0 | 0 | 0 | 0 | 0 | 0 | 0 | 7 | 0 |
| Rosenborg | 2026 | Eliteserien | 0 | 0 | 0 | 0 | 0 | 0 | 0 | 0 | 0 | 0 |
| Rosenborg | Total | | 11 | 1 | 0 | 0 | 2 | 0 | 0 | 0 | 13 | 1 |
| Hødd (loan) | 2025 | OBOS-ligaen | 19 | 1 | 3 | 1 | 0 | 0 | 0 | 0 | 22 | 2 |
| Hødd (loan) | Total | | 19 | 1 | 3 | 1 | 0 | 0 | 0 | 0 | 22 | 2 |
| Norrby (loan) | 2026 | Superettan | 8 | 0 | 0 | 0 | 0 | 0 | 0 | 0 | 8 | 0 |
| Norrby (loan) | Total | | 8 | 0 | 0 | 0 | 0 | 0 | 0 | 0 | 8 | 0 |
| Levanger (loan) | 2026 | 2. Divisjon | 11 | 3 | 1 | 0 | 0 | 0 | 0 | 0 | 12 | 3 |
| Levanger (loan) | Total | | 11 | 3 | 1 | 0 | 0 | 0 | 0 | 0 | 12 | 3 |
| Career total | | | 49 | 5 | 4 | 1 | 2 | 0 | 0 | 0 | 55 | 6 |
