= Tobias Dahl =

Norwegian footballer (born 2007)

Personal information
- Full name: Tobias Solheim Dahl
- Date of birth: 12 January 2005 (age 21)
- Place of birth: Trondheim, Norway
- Positions: Defender; midfielder

Team information
- Current team: Rosenborg
- Number: 3

Youth career
- –2017: Klæbu
- 2018–2019: Melhus
- 2019: Tiller
- 2020–2024: Rosenborg

Senior career*
Years	Team	Apps	(Gls)
2024–	Rosenborg	25	(0)
2025	→ Moss (loan)	8	(0)

International career^{‡}
2022	Norway U17	2	(0)
- * Club domestic league appearances and goals as of 22 November 2026 ‡ National team caps and goals as of 12 August 2024

Tobias Solheim Dahl (born 12 January 2005) is a Norwegian footballer who plays for Norwegian club Rosenborg.

== Club career ==
Dahl made his first team debut for Rosenborg in a cup game against Verdal in May 2022. In March 2024, Dahl signed a new two-year deal with Rosenborg.

In August 2024, Dahl made his league debut when he came on against KFUM Oslo.

== Career statistics ==
As of 22 November 2026

Appearances and goals by club, season and competition
Club	Season	Division	League		Cup		Continental		Total	
Club	Season	Division	Apps	Goals	Apps	Goals	Apps	Goals	Apps	Goals
Rosenborg	2022	Eliteserien	0	0	1	0	0	0	1	0
Rosenborg	2023	Eliteserien	0	0	0	0	0	0	0	0
Rosenborg	2024	Eliteserien	1	0	1	0	0	0	2	0
Rosenborg	2025	Eliteserien	4	0	0	0	0	0	4	0
Rosenborg	2026	Eliteserien	20	0	4	0	0	0	24	0
Rosenborg	Total		25	0	6	0	0	0	31	0
Moss (loan)	2025	OBOS-ligaen	8	0	3	0	0	0	11	0
Career total			33	0	9	0	0	0	42	0
