= Håkon Singsdal Volden =

Norwegian footballer (born 2007)

Håkon Volden
Personal information
- Full name: Håkon Singsdal Volden
- Date of birth: 25 May 2007 (age 19)
- Place of birth: Trondheim, Norway
- Height: 1.95 m (6 ft 5 in)
- Position: Defender

Team information
- Current team: Rosenborg
- Number: 5

Youth career
- –2018: Othilienborg
- 2019–2021: Nardo
- 2022–2023: Rosenborg

Senior career*
Years	Team	Apps	(Gls)
2024–	Rosenborg	23	(0)

International career^{‡}
2023	Norway U16	12	(0)
2024	Norway U17	3	(0)
2025–	Norway U18	5	(1)
2025–	Norway U19	2	(0)
- * Club domestic league appearances and goals as of 3 August 2026 ‡ National team caps and goals as of 22 June 2025

Håkon Singsdal Volden (born 25 May 2007) is a Norwegian footballer who plays for Norwegian club Rosenborg.

== Club career ==
In April 2024, Volden signed a first team contract with Rosenborg. A few days later on the 7 of April he made his debut for Rosenborg coming on as a substitute in a league game against Strømsgodset.

Three days after his debut he started his first match in a cup match against Sverresborg, playing the entire match in a 6–0 win.

== Personal life ==
His uncle Ole Johan Singsdal also played for Rosenborg.

== Career statistics ==
As of 16 September 2026

Appearances and goals by club, season and competition
Club	Season	Division	League		Cup		Continental		Total	
Club	Season	Division	Apps	Goals	Apps	Goals	Apps	Goals	Apps	Goals
Rosenborg	2024	Eliteserien	4	0	3	0	0	0	7	0
Rosenborg	2025	Eliteserien	13	0	5	0	1	0	19	0
Rosenborg	2026	Eliteserien	6	0	3	0	0	0	9	0
Rosenborg	Total		23	0	11	0	1	0	35	0
Career total			23	0	11	0	1	0	35	0
