= Jesper Reitan-Sunde =

Norwegian footballer (born 2006)

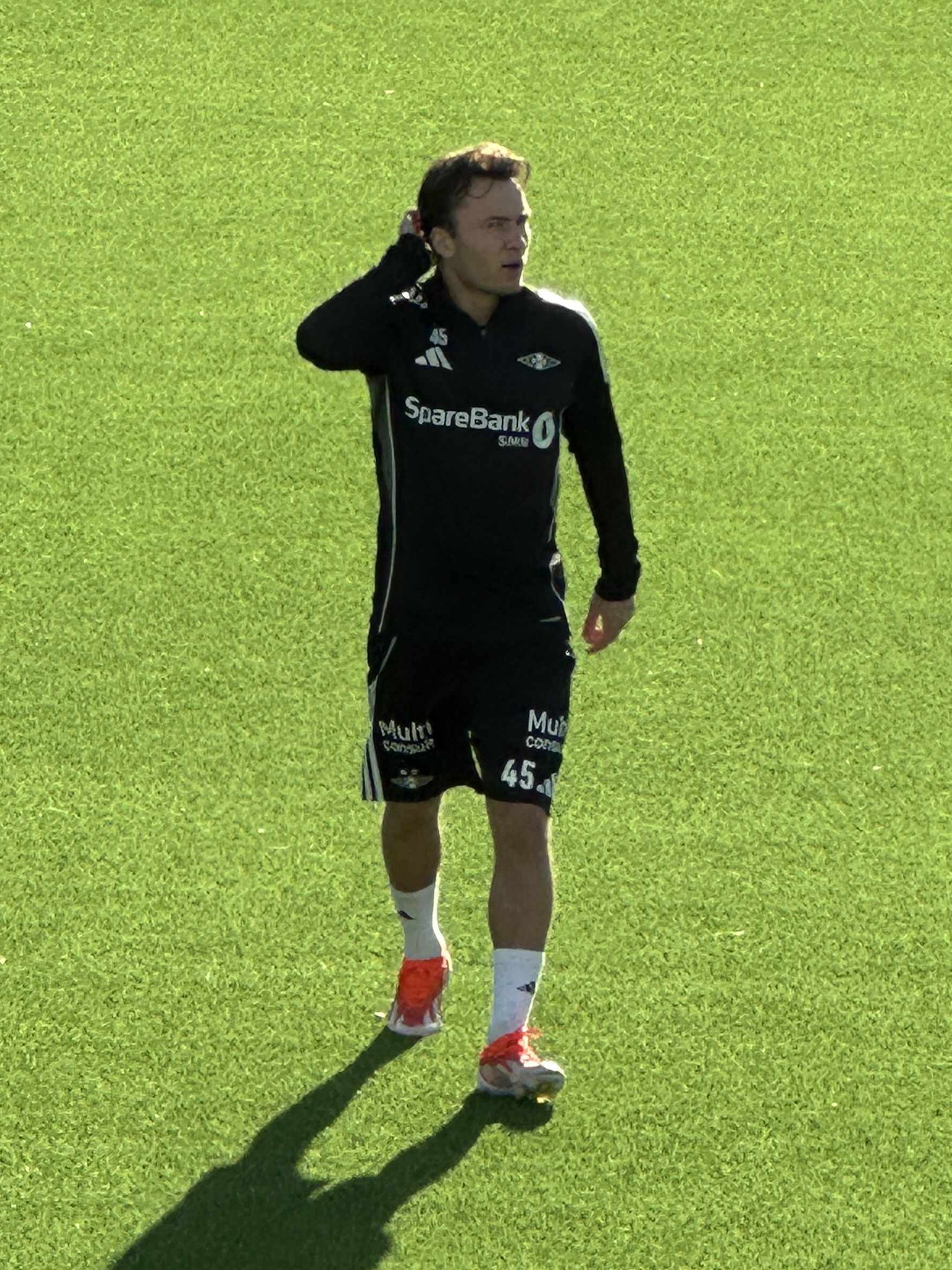

Personal information
- Full name: Jesper Harald Reitan-Sunde
- Date of birth: 31 January 2006 (age 20)
- Place of birth: Trondheim, Norway
- Height: 1.68 m (5 ft 6 in)
- Position: Midfielder

Team information
- Current team: Rosenborg
- Number: 14

Youth career
- –2020: Nardo
- 2020–2023: Rosenborg

Senior career*
Years	Team	Apps	(Gls)
2024–	Rosenborg	59	(2)

International career^{‡}
2023	Norway U17	4	(1)
2024	Norway U18	9	(2)
2025–	Norway U19	7	(0)
2025–	Norway U21	4	(0)
- * Club domestic league appearances and goals as of 22 November 2026 ‡ National team caps and goals as of 18 November 2025

Jesper Reitan-Sunde (born 31 January 2006) is a Norwegian footballer who plays for Norwegian club Rosenborg.

== Club career ==
In February 2023 Reitan-Sunde signed his first professional contract with Rosenborg. A year later he signed a new contract and became a part of the first team squad.

Reitan-Sunde made his Rosenborg debut 1 April 2024 when he started in the first league match of the season against Sandefjord.

== Personal life ==
He is a grandson of Harald Sunde.

== Career statistics ==
As of 22 November 2026

Appearances and goals by club, season and competition
Club	Season	Division	League		Cup		Continental		Total	
Club	Season	Division	Apps	Goals	Apps	Goals	Apps	Goals	Apps	Goals
Rosenborg	2024	Eliteserien	29	2	2	0	0	0	31	2
Rosenborg	2025	Eliteserien	17	0	6	1	6	0	29	1
Rosenborg	2026	Eliteserien	13	0	3	2	0	0	16	2
Rosenborg	Total		59	2	11	3	6	0	76	5
Career total			59	2	11	3	6	0	76	5
