= Tomáš Nemčík =

Slovak footballer

Personal information
- Full name: Tomáš Nemčík
- Date of birth: 19 April 2001 (age 25)
- Place of birth: Žilina, Slovakia
- Height: 1.90 m (6 ft 3 in)
- Position: Centre-back

Team information
- Current team: Rosenborg
- Number: 21

Youth career
- 2011–2021: Žilina

Senior career*
Years	Team	Apps	(Gls)
2018–2022	Žilina B	29	(1)
2020–2024	Žilina	62	(2)
2024	→ Rosenborg (loan)	4	(0)
2024–	Rosenborg	63	(1)

International career^{‡}
2017	Slovakia U16	6	(0)
2018–2020	Slovakia U19	6	(1)
2021–2022	Slovakia U21	12	(0)
- * Club domestic league appearances and goals as of 22 November 2026 ‡ National team caps and goals as of 13:37, 8 June 2022 (UTC)

Tomáš Nemčík (born 19 April 2001) is a Slovak professional footballer who currently plays for Eliteserien club Rosenborg as a defender.

== Club career ==
=== MŠK Žilina ===
Nemčík made his Fortuna Liga debut for Žilina during an away fixture against Ružomberok on 21 October 2020. He appeared in the starting-XI and completed the entirety of the match. While Žilina was one up after the first half after a goal by Dawid Kurminowski, Šošoni conceded twice in the last ten minutes following strikes by Matej Kochan and Martin Regáli, losing the game 1:2.

In March 2022, Nemčík had extended his contract with Žilina until the summer of 2024.

In the end of January 2024, Nemčík was loaned out to Norwegian side Rosenborg BK, and on 26 April 2024, Rosenborg BK made the deal permanent, which means he signed a contract until the end of 2028.

== Career statistics ==
=== Club ===
As of match played 22 November 2026

Appearances and goals by club, season and competition
Club	Season	League			National Cup		Continental		Total	
Club	Season	Division	Apps	Goals	Apps	Goals	Apps	Goals	Apps	Goals
Žilina	2020–21	Niké liga	3	0	2	0	—		2	0
Žilina	2021–22	Niké liga	22	1	2	0	—		24	1
Žilina	2022–23	Niké liga	27	0	1	0	—		28	0
Žilina	2023–24	Niké liga	10	1	1	1	4	0	15	2
Žilina	Total		62	2	6	1	4	0	72	3
Rosenborg	2024	Eliteserien	21	0	2	0	—		23	0
Rosenborg	2025	Eliteserien	23	1	2	0	6	0	31	1
Rosenborg	2026	Eliteserien	23	0	1	0	—		24	0
Rosenborg	Total		67	1	5	0	6	0	78	1
Career total			129	3	11	1	10	0	150	4

== International career ==
Nemčík was first recognised in Slovak senior national team nomination in November 2022 by Francesco Calzona being listed as an alternate for two friendly fixtures against Montenegro and Marek Hamšík's retirement game against Chile. Few weeks later, in December, he was nominated for prospective players' training camp at NTC Senec.
