= 2026 Rosenborg BK season =

Rosenborg 2026 football season

Rosenborg
2026 season
- Chairman: Cecilie Gotaas Johnsen
- Coach: Freyr Alexandersson
- Stadium: Lerkendal Stadion
- Eliteserien: 5th
- Norwegian Cup 2025–26: Fourth round
- Norwegian Cup 2026–27: Third round
- Top goalscorer: League: Amin Chiakha (18 goal); All: Amin Chiakha (19 goal)
- Highest home attendance: 21,426 vs Aalesund (16 May)
- Lowest home attendance: 10,246 vs Sarpsborg 08 (12 April)
- Average home league attendance: 13,670 (7 November)
Home colours	Away colours

The 2026 season is Rosenborg's 47th consecutive year in the top flight now known as Eliteserien, their 58th season in the top flight of Norwegian football. In addition to the Eliteserien, the club is participating in the Norwegian Cup 2025–26 and Norwegian Cup 2026–27. This was Alfred Johansson's third season in charge of Rosenborg but he was replaced after 7 matches, first by interim manager Alexander Tettey and then Freyr Alexandersson.

== Squad ==
Note: Flags indicate national team as defined under FIFA eligibility rules; some limited exceptions apply. Players may hold more than one non-FIFA nationality.

No.	Pos.	Nation	Player
1	GK	SWE	Leopold Wahlstedt
3	MF	NOR	Tobias Dahl
4	DF	NOR	Mikkel Ceïde
5	DF	NOR	Håkon Volden
6	MF	NOR	Mathias Kjølø
7	MF	NOR	Simen Bolkan Nordli
8	MF	NOR	Iver Fossum
9	FW	MNE	Dino Islamović
10	MF	NOR	Ole Selnæs (captain)
11	FW	DEN	Noah Sahsah
12	GK	NOR	Rasmus Sandberg
14	DF	NOR	Jesper Reitan-Sunde
15	DF	DEN	Jonas Mortensen
16	DF	NOR	Aslak Fonn Witry

No.	Pos.	Nation	Player
17	MF	DEN	Mads Bomholt
18	FW	ALG	Amin Chiakha
19	DF	NOR	Adrian Pereira
20	MF	NOR	Aleksander Borgersen
21	DF	SVK	Tomáš Nemčík
22	DF	NOR	Jonas Svensson
23	DF	UKR	Mark Mampassi
24	GK	NOR	Haakon Ingdal Sørum
25	MF	NOR	Johan Bakke
28	MF	NOR	Elias Slørdal
29	FW	SVK	Dávid Ďuriš
30	MF	NOR	Maciej Soboczynski
35	FW	NOR	Emil Ceïde
57	FW	NOR	Daniel Thorstensen

== Transfers ==
=== Winter ===
In: Note: Flags indicate national team as defined under FIFA eligibility rules; some limited exceptions apply. Players may hold more than one non-FIFA nationality.

No.	Pos.	Nation	Player
1	GK	SWE	Leopold Wahlstedt (from (Denmark) AGF)
17	MF	DEN	Mads Bomholt (from (Denmark) AaB)
18	FW	ALG	Amin Chiakha (on loan from (Denmark) F.C. Copenhagen)
22	DF	NOR	Jonas Svensson (from (Turkey) Beşiktaş)
25	MF	NOR	Johan Bakke (from (Norway) Strømsgodset)

Out: Note: Flags indicate national team as defined under FIFA eligibility rules; some limited exceptions apply. Players may hold more than one non-FIFA nationality.

No.	Pos.	Nation	Player
1	GK	NOR	Sander Tangvik (to (Germany) Hamburger SV)
2	DF	NOR	Erlend Dahl Reitan (released, to (Norway) Start)
4	DF	DEN	Luka Racic (to (Lithuania) Kauno Žalgiris)
5	MF	SWE	Moustafa Zeidan (loan return to (Sweden) Malmö FF)
9	MF	NOR	Ole Sæter (to (Norway) Vålerenga)
23	DF	NOR	Ulrik Yttergård Jenssen (on loan to (Norway) Lillestrøm)
30	FW	NOR	Magnus Holte (on loan to (Sweden) Norrby, previously on loan at Hødd)
55	DF	NOR	Elias Sandrød (on loan to Stjørdals-Blink)
56	MF	NOR	Isak Holmen (on loan to Levanger)
—	FW	NOR	Oscar Aga (to (Norway) Moss)
—	MF	SWE	Henry Sletsjøe (to (Sweden) GAIS, previously on loan at Kristiansund)

=== Summer ===
In: Note: Flags indicate national team as defined under FIFA eligibility rules; some limited exceptions apply. Players may hold more than one non-FIFA nationality.

No.	Pos.	Nation	Player
23	DF	UKR	Mark Mampassi (free agent)

Out: Note: Flags indicate national team as defined under FIFA eligibility rules; some limited exceptions apply. Players may hold more than one non-FIFA nationality.

No.	Pos.	Nation	Player
2	DF	NOR	Håkon Røsten (to (Norway) KFUM Oslo)
6	MF	FIN	Santeri Väänänen (to (Germany) Karlsruher SC)
23	DF	NOR	Ulrik Yttergård Jenssen (to (Denmark) Odense)
30	FW	NOR	Magnus Holte (on loan to (Norway) Levanger, previously on loan at (Sweden) Norrby)

== Friendlies ==
30 January 2026	Randers FC (Denmark)	1–0	(Norway) Rosenborg	Algarve, Portugal
18:30 CET (UTC+1)	Mahmoud 67'			Stadium: Estádio Algarve

2 February 2026	IFK Göteborg (Sweden)	1–0	(Norway) Rosenborg	Algarve, Portugal
20:30 CET (UTC+1)	Fenger 90'			Stadium: Estádio Algarve

6 February 2026	Mjällby (Sweden)	0–0	(Norway) Rosenborg	Algarve, Portugal
20:30 CET (UTC+1)				Stadium: Estádio Algarve

9 February 2026	SK Artis Brno (Czech Republic)	0–1	(Norway) Rosenborg	Algarve, Portugal
17:00 CET (UTC+1)			Yttergård Jenssen 6'	Stadium: Estádio Algarve

19 February 2026	Ranheim	1–2	Rosenborg	Trondheim
14:00 CET (UTC+1)	Fossli 55'		Bomholt 5'; Chiakha 17'	Stadium: EXTRA Arena

24 February 2026	Start	1–2	Rosenborg	Marbella, Spain
17:00 CET (UTC+1)	Chiakha 35'; Ceidé 40'		Lorentzen 88'	Stadium: Banús Football Center

27 February 2026	Vålerenga	1–0	Rosenborg	Marbella, Spain
16:30 CET (UTC+1)	Sørensen 23' (pen.)			Stadium: Banús Football Center

27 February 2026	Rosenborg	4–1	Stjørdals-Blink	Trondheim
16:30 CET (UTC+1)	Sahsah 24'; Iver Fossum 52', 68'; Islamović 84'	Summary	Feldt 31'	Stadium: Granåsen Fotballhall

5 July 2026	Rosenborg	2–1	Molde	Trondheim
15:30 CEST (UTC+2)	Bolkan Nordli 12'; Islamović 90' (pen.)		Stenevik 48'	Stadium: Lerkendal Stadion; Attendance: 1,119

24 July 2026	Rosenborg (Norway)	0–5	(England) Manchester United	Trondheim
18:00 CEST (UTC+2)		Summary	Lacey 31'; Zirkzee 56'; Devaney 63' (yellow card) 88'; Amass 72'; Williams 84'	Stadium: Lerkendal Stadion; Referee: Mathias Støfringshaug

== Competitions ==
=== Eliteserien ===
==== Results summary ====
Overall								Home						Away					
Pld	W	D	L	GF	GA	GD	Pts	W	D	L	GF	GA	GD	W	D	L	GF	GA	GD
26	14	4	8	53	32	+21	46	8	3	2	32	15	+17	6	1	6	21	17	+4

Last updated: 7 November 2026.
Source: see below

==== Results by round ====
Round	1	2	3	4	5	6	7	8	9	10	11	12	13	14	15	16	17	18	19	20	21	22	23	24	25	26	27	28	29	30
Ground	B	H	B	H	B	H	B	H	H	B	H	B	H	B	H	B	B	H	B	H	H	B	H	B	B	H	B	H	B	H
Result	L	L	L	W	D	D	L	W	L	L	D	W	W	W	W	L	W	W	L	W	W	W	D	W	W	W				
Position	14	16	16	13	13	13	14	12	15	15	15	12	9	8	8	8	7	6	6	6	6	5	5	4						

Updated to match(es) played on 7 November 2026. Source: see below
A = Away; H = Home; W = Win; D = Draw; L = Loss

==== Results ====
14 March 2026 1	Molde	2–0	Rosenborg	Molde
18:00 CET (UTC+1)	Breivik 31'; Hestad 57' (yellow card) 31'	Summary	Witry (yellow card) 5'; Svensson (yellow card) 45+4'; Ďuriš (yellow card) 60'; Chiakha (yellow card) 73'	Stadium: Aker Stadion; Attendance: 9,630; Referee: Tore Hansen

22 March 2026 2	Rosenborg	0–2	Vålerenga	Trondheim
14:30 CET (UTC+1)	Witry (yellow card) 85'	Summary	Lange 58'; Näsberg 63'; Finnsson (yellow card) 65'; Haren (yellow card) 78'	Stadium: Lerkendal Stadion; Attendance: 13,374; Referee: Sigrud Kringstad

6 April 2026 3	Tromsø	2–0	Rosenborg	Tromsø
18:15 CEST (UTC+2)	Hjertø-Dahl 28'; Åsen Larsen 48'	Summary	Wahlstedt (yellow card) 21'; Svensson (yellow card) 35'; M Ceïde (yellow card) 84'	Stadium: Alfheim Stadion; Attendance: 6,027; Referee: Ola Hobber Nilsen

12 April 2026 4	Rosenborg	2–1	Sarpsborg 08	Trondheim
13:30 CEST (UTC+2)	Bomholt 33' (yellow card) 23'; Bolkan Nordli 51'; Selnæs (yellow card) 68'; Mortensen (yellow card) 79'	Summary	Sher 5'; Karlsbakk (yellow card) 84'	Stadium: Lerkendal Stadion; Attendance: 10,246; Referee: Christian Moen

18 April 2026 5	Sandefjord	0–0	Rosenborg	Sandefjord
15:00 CEST (UTC+2)	Walle Egeli (yellow card) 54'; Möller (yellow card) 58'; Sundbø Pettersen (yellow card) 74'	Summary	Bolkan Nordli (yellow card) 42'	Stadium: Jotun Arena; Attendance: 6,023; Referee: Marius Hansen Grøtta

25 April 2026 6	Rosenborg	1–1	Brann	Trondheim
17:00 CEST (UTC+2)	Fossum 13'; Nemčík (yellow card) 87'	Summary	Thorsteinsson 19' (yellow card) 49'; Ingason (yellow card) 70'; Lungi Sørensen (yellow card) 74'	Stadium: Lerkendal Stadion; Attendance: 12,378; Referee: Rohit Saggi

1 May 2026 7	Viking	3–0	Rosenborg	Stavanger
17:00 CEST (UTC+2)	Falchener 2'; Stensness (yellow card) 14'; Askildsen 15'; Tripić 67'; Haugen (yellow card) 90+5'	Summary	Fonn Witry (yellow card) 44'; Dahl (yellow card) 54'; Røsten (yellow card) 61'	Stadium: Viking Stadion; Attendance: 15,900; Referee: Sivert Amland

10 May 2026 8	Rosenborg	2–0	Lillestrøm	Trondheim
13:30 CEST (UTC+2)	Bolkan Nordli 10' (pen.); Chiakha 24'; Fonn Witry (yellow card) 42'; Selnæs (yellow card) 45+4'	Summary	Ibrahimaj (yellow card) 30'; Moen Foss (yellow card) 90+2'	Stadium: Lerkendal Stadion; Attendance: 11,892; Referee: Ola Hobber Nilsen

16 May 2026 9	Rosenborg	2–3	Aalesund	Trondheim
15:00 CEST (UTC+2)	Chiakha 3'; Nemčík (yellow card) 39'; E Ceïde 78'; Islamović (yellow card) 90+4'	Summary	Klaesson (yellow card) 6'; Lonebu 29'; Christensen 50' (yellow card) 55'; Elias Hagen (yellow card) 66'; Osenbroch 80'; Charles (yellow card) 90'; Hammer Kjelsen (yellow card) 90+4'; Myrlid (yellow card) 90+8'	Stadium: Lerkendal Stadion; Attendance: 21,426; Referee: Stian Røvig Sletner

25 May 2026 10	KFUM	2–0	Rosenborg	Oslo
16:00 CEST (UTC+2)	Schneider 3'; Haltvik 27'; Hickson 46'; Vinjor (yellow card) 63'	Summary		Stadium: KFUM-Arena; Attendance: 3,199; Referee: Mischa Kellerhals

29 May 2026 11	Rosenborg	2–2	Bodø/Glimt	Trondheim
18:00 CEST (UTC+2)	Islamović 36', 62'; E Ceïde (yellow card) 72'; Reitan-Sunde (yellow card) 90+4'	Summary	Høgh 32', 69'; Auklend (yellow card) 90+8'	Stadium: Lerkendal Stadion; Attendance: 14,177; Referee: Sivert Amland

24 October 2026 12	HamKam	0–3	Rosenborg	Hamar
18:00 CEST (UTC+2)	Mares (yellow card) 41'; Metcalfe (yellow card) 62'; Strand Nilsen (yellow card) 90+2'	Summary	Sahsah (yellow card) 55'; Wahlstedt (yellow card) 59'; Mares 69' (o.g.); Chiakha 74'; E Ceïde 89'	Stadium: Briskeby Stadion; Attendance: 4,885; Referee: Stian Røvig Sletner

12 July 2026 13	Rosenborg	3–0	Kristiansund	Trondheim
17:00 CEST (UTC+2)	Svensson 25'; Ďuriš 31'; Chiakha 54'; Islamović (penalty missed) 72'	Summary	Skeide (yellow card) 78'	Stadium: Lerkendal Stadion; Attendance: 10,378; Referee: Marius Lien

18 July 2026 14	Start	0–3	Rosenborg	Kristiansand
15:00 CEST (UTC+2)	Mvoué (yellow card) 74'	Summary	Chiakha 35' (pen.) 90+5'; Bolkan Nordli 90+3' (yellow card) 74'; Reitan-Sunde (yellow card) 77'	Stadium: Sparebanken Sør Arena; Attendance: 8,167; Referee: Mohammad Usman Aslam

27 July 2026 15	Rosenborg	4–0	Fredrikstad	Trondheim
19:00 CEST (UTC+2)	Pereira 10' (yellow card) 32'; E Ceïde 13'; Chiakha 77'; Fossum 88'	Summary		Stadium: Lerkendal Stadion; Attendance: 11,123; Referee: Ola Hobber Nilsen

2 August 2026 16	Brann	3–2	Rosenborg	Bergen
19:15 CEST (UTC+2)	Castro 14' (yellow card) 79'; Pedersen (yellow card) 69'; Ingason 75'; Eriksen 90+2'	Summary	E Ceïde (yellow card) 2'; Chiakha 62' (pen.) (yellow card) 59'; Fossum 67'; Pereira (yellow card) 79'	Stadium: Brann Stadion; Attendance: 17,402; Referee: Tore Hansen

9 August 2026 17	Lillestrøm	0–2	Rosenborg	Lillestrøm
14:30 CEST (UTC+2)	Woxen (yellow card) 90+4'	Summary	Svensson (yellow card) 24'; Sahsah 39'; Ďuriš (yellow card) 69'; Nemčík (yellow card) 74'; Dahl (yellow card) 84'; Chiakha 90' (yellow card) 63'; Bomholt (yellow card) 90+6'	Stadium: Åråsen Stadion; Attendance: 10,556; Referee: Sigurd Kringstad

14 August 2026 18	Rosenborg	2–1	Viking	Trondheim
19:00 CEST (UTC+2)	E Ceïde 15'; Chiakha 90+5'	Summary	Christiansen 81'	Stadium: Lerkendal Stadion; Attendance: 17,566; Referee: Rohit Saggi

30 August 2026 19	Bodø/Glimt	4–2	Rosenborg	Bodø
14:30 CEST (UTC+2)	Bjørkan 41', 58'; Helmersen 61', 77'; Blomberg (yellow card) 89'	Summary	Ďuriš (yellow card) 12'; Bolkan Nordli 36'; E Ceïde 88'	Stadium: Aspmyra Stadion; Attendance: 8,226; Referee: Ola Hobber Nilsen

5 September 2026 20	Rosenborg	4–0	HamKam	Trondheim
16:00 CEST (UTC+2)	E Ceïde 1'; Sahsah 52'; Chiakha 59', 76'	Summary	Johnsgård (yellow card) 22'; Isufi (yellow card) 46'	Stadium: Lerkendal Stadion; Attendance: 15,087; Referee: Marius Lien

12 September 2026 21	Rosenborg	5–3	Tromsø	Trondheim
18:00 CEST (UTC+2)	Selnæs 3'; Chiakha 5'; Sahsah 34', 47'; Fonn Witry 43'; Wahlstedt (yellow card) 73'; Soboczynski (yellow card) 86'	Summary	Erlien (yellow card) 42'; Edvardsson (yellow card) 50'; Nyhammer 71'; Åsen Larsen 75' (pen.); Selnæs 77' (o.g.); Osuji (yellow card) 90+4'	Stadium: Lerkendal Stadion; Attendance: 16,155; Referee: Tore Hansen

19 September 2026 22	Kristiansund	1–3	Rosenborg	Kristiansund
16:00 CEST (UTC+2)	Tufekcic 31'; Ulvestad (yellow card) 39'	Summary	Bomholt 33'; Sahsah 50'; Chiakha 83'	Stadium: Kristiansund Stadion; Attendance: 4,132; Referee: Marius Lien

10 October 2026 23	Rosenborg	1–1	Sandefjord	Trondheim
18:00 CEST (UTC+2)	Chiakha 5' (pen.) (yellow card) 20]'; Selnæs (yellow card) 44' (yellow-red card) 61'; Nemčík (yellow card) 56'	Summary	Bomholt (yellow card) 45' (yellow-red card) 51'; Walle Egeli 73'	Stadium: Lerkendal Stadion; Attendance: 12,263; Referee: Christian Moen

18 October 2026 24	Sarpsborg 08	0–3	Rosenborg	Sarpsborg
14:30 CEST (UTC+2)	Christiansen (yellow card) 43]'; Karlsbakk (yellow card) 57'	Summary	Fonn Witry 29'; Kjølø (yellow card) 34'; Pereira (yellow card) 36'; Bomholt (yellow card) 65'; Mortensen 90+7' (yellow card) 83'	Stadium: Sarpsborg Stadion; Attendance: 6,170; Referee: Espen Eskås

31 October 2026 25	Fredrikstad	0–3	Rosenborg	Fredrikstad
16:00 CET (UTC+1)	Nilsson (yellow card) 58'	Summary	Fonn Witry (yellow card) 30'; Chiakha 45' (penalty scored) 90+3' (yellow card) 59'; Bomholt 67' (yellow card) 58'	Stadium: Fredrikstad Stadion; Referee: Sigurd Kringstad

7 November 2026 26	Rosenborg	4–1	Start	Trondheim
18:00 CET (UTC+1)	Selnæs 27' (yellow card) 74'; Svensson 42'; Nemčík (yellow card) 57'; Chiakha 88' (pen.); Dashaev 90+5' (o.g.)	Summary	Segberg (yellow card) 45+2'; Meyer (yellow card) 53'; Dashaev (yellow card) 79'; Koutsakos 90+3'	Stadium: Lerkendal Stadion; Attendance: 11,642; Referee: Espen Eskås

22 November 2026 27	Aalesund	–	Rosenborg	Ålesund
17:00 CET (UTC+1)				Stadium: Color Line Stadion

28 November 2026 28	Rosenborg	–	Molde	Trondheim
18:00 CET (UTC+1)				Stadium: Lerkendal Stadion

5 December 2026 29	Vålerenga	–	Rosenborg	Oslo
18:00 CET (UTC+1)				Stadium: Intility Arena

13 December 2026 30	Rosenborg	–	KFUM	Trondheim
17:00 CET (UTC+1)				Stadium: Lerkendal Stadion

==== Table ====
Pos	Team	Pld	W	D	L	GF	GA	GD	Pts	Qualification or relegation
2	Bodø/Glimt (T)	25	19	2	4	61	23	+38	59	Qualification for the Champions League second qualifying round
3	Molde	25	13	4	8	59	39	+20	43	Qualification for the Conference League second qualifying round
4	Rosenborg	25	13	4	8	49	31	+18	43	Qualification for the Conference League second qualifying round
5	Lillestrøm	25	13	3	9	36	33	+3	42	
6	Tromsø	25	11	7	7	43	38	+5	40	

Updated to match(es) played on 1 November 2026. Source: Football Association of Norway (in Norwegian)
Rules for classification: 1) Points; 2) Goal difference; 3) Goals scored; 4) Head-to-head points; 5) Head-to-head goal difference; 6) Head-to-head goals scored.
(T) Qualified, but not yet for the particular phase indicated

=== 2025–26 Norwegian Cup ===
24 September 2025 Third round	FK Haugesund	1–4 (a.e.t.)	Rosenborg	Haugesund
18:00 CEST (UTC+2)	Dia (yellow card) 29'; Grindhaug 57'; Hannola (yellow card) 62'; Nyhammer (yellow card) 90+6'	Summary	Islamović 90+4', 107'; Selnæs (yellow card) 90+4'; Dahl Reitan 94', 98' (yellow card) 90+5'	Stadium: Haugesund Stadion; Attendance: 1,045; Referee: Ola Hobber Nilsen

8 March 2026 Fourth round	Bryne	4–2 (a.e.t.)	Rosenborg	Bryne
16:00 CET (UTC+1)	Scriven 3'; Røragen Hermansen (yellow card) 71'; Jonassen 90+5', 117' (yellow card) 118'; Heiberg (yellow card) 96'; Strunck 104'		E Ceïde 9'; Chiakha 31' (yellow card) 71'; Bomholt (yellow card) 41'; Wahlstedt (yellow card) 90+4'	Stadium: Bryne Stadion; Attendance: 1,691; Referee: Kristoffer Hagenes

=== 2026–27 Norwegian Cup ===
22 August 2026 First round	Nationalkameratene	0–9	Rosenborg	Trondheim
16:00 CEST (UTC+2)		Summary	Soboczynski 17'; Witry 32'; Slørdal 53', 57'; E Ceïde 62'; Borgersen 71'; Reitan-Sunde 73', 83'; Sahsah 77'	Stadium: Hallset Kunstgress; Attendance: 2,704; Referee: Per Oscar Grov Heiberg

16 September 2026 Second round	Fløya	1–4	Rosenborg	Tromsø
18:00 CEST (UTC+2)	Marblow 45'; Bogdan (yellow card) 75'; Henriksen Valen (yellow card) 82'	Summary	Witry 76'; Bomholt 87'; E Ceïde 89' (penalty scored) 90+4'	Stadium: Fløya Arena; Referee: Egil Bertheussen

28 October 2026 Third round	Rosenborg	1–2	HamKam	Trondheim
18:00 CEST (UTC+2)	E Ceïde 39'; Kjølø (yellow card) 49'; Mortensen (yellow card) 73'; Selnæs (yellow card) 86'; Nemčík (yellow card) 90+1'	Summary	Opsahl (yellow card) 44'; Barros (yellow card) 57'; Benjamin 72'; Jónsson 84' (yellow card) 80'; Potur (yellow card) 86'	Stadium: Lerkendal Stadion; Attendance: 6,452; Referee: Tore Hansen

== Squad statistics ==
=== Appearances and goals ===
As of match played 7 November 2026

No.	Pos	Nat	Player	Total		Eliteserien		2025–26 Norwegian Cup		2026–27 Norwegian Cup	
No.	Pos	Nat	Player	Apps	Goals	Apps	Goals	Apps	Goals	Apps	Goals
1	GK	(Sweden) SWE	Leopold Wahlstedt	27	0	26+0	0	1+0	0	0+0	0
3	DF	(Norway) NOR	Tobias Dahl	23	0	9+10	0	0+1	0	2+1	0
4	DF	(Norway) NOR	Mikkel Ceïde	19	0	18+0	0	1+0	0	0+0	0
5	DF	(Norway) NOR	Håkon Volden	9	0	3+3	0	1+0	0	2+0	0
6	MF	(Norway) NOR	Mathias Kjølø	10	0	3+5	0	0+0	0	2+0	0
7	MF	(Norway) NOR	Simen Bolkan Nordli	15	4	11+4	4	0+0	0	0+0	0
8	MF	(Norway) NOR	Iver Fossum	18	3	9+7	3	1+0	0	1+0	0
9	FW	(Montenegro) MNE	Dino Islamović	15	2	4+9	2	1+0	0	0+1	0
10	MF	(Norway) NOR	Ole Selnæs	23	2	20+2	2	0+0	0	0+1	0
11	FW	(Denmark) DEN	Noah Sahsah	23	6	13+7	5	0+0	0	2+1	1
12	GK	(Norway) NOR	Rasmus Sandberg	3	0	0+0	0	0+0	0	3+0	0
13	GK	(Norway) NOR	David Amdam	0	0	0+0	0	0+0	0	0+0	0
14	FW	(Norway) NOR	Jesper Reitan-Sunde	15	2	0+12	0	0+0	0	1+2	2
15	DF	(Denmark) DEN	Jonas Mortensen	20	1	4+13	1	0+0	0	2+1	0
16	DF	(Norway) NOR	Aslak Fonn Witry	24	4	15+6	2	1+0	0	1+1	2
17	MF	(Denmark) DEN	Mads Bomholt	28	4	25+0	3	1+0	0	2+0	1
18	FW	(Algeria) ALG	Amin Chiakha	29	19	24+1	18	1+0	1	3+0	0
19	DF	(Norway) NOR	Adrian Pereira	22	2	13+6	2	1+0	0	0+2	0
20	MF	(Norway) NOR	Aleksander Borgersen	2	1	0+0	0	0+0	0	0+2	1
21	DF	(Slovakia) SVK	Tomáš Nemčík	23	0	22+0	0	0+0	0	1+0	0
22	DF	(Norway) NOR	Jonas Svensson	20	2	15+3	2	1+0	0	1+0	0
23	DF	(Ukraine) UKR	Mark Mampassi	7	0	1+3	0	0+0	0	3+0	0
24	GK	(Norway) NOR	Haakon Ingdal Sørum	0	0	0+0	0	0+0	0	0+0	0
25	MF	(Norway) NOR	Johan Bakke	9	0	3+5	0	0+1	0	0+0	0
26	DF	(Norway) NOR	Ulrik Hald-Hernes	1	0	0+0	0	0+0	0	0+1	0
28	MF	(Norway) NOR	Elias Slørdal	1	2	0+0	0	0+0	0	1+0	2
29	FW	(Slovakia) SVK	Dávid Ďuriš	20	1	9+9	1	1+0	0	1+0	0
30	FW	(Norway) NOR	Maciej Soboczynski	8	1	1+5	0	0+0	0	2+0	1
35	FW	(Norway) NOR	Emil Ceïde	30	10	25+1	5	1+0	1	2+1	4
37	DF	(Norway) NOR	Boye Hedman	1	0	0+0	0	0+0	0	0+1	0
57	FW	(Norway) NOR	Daniel Thorstensen	0	0	0+0	0	0+0	0	0+0	0
Players away from Rosenborg on loan:
30	FW	(Norway) NOR	Magnus Holte	0	0	0+0	0	0+0	0	0+0	0
55	DF	(Norway) NOR	Elias Sandrød	0	0	0+0	0	0+0	0	0+0	0
56	MF	(Norway) NOR	Isak Holmen	0	0	0+0	0	0+0	0	0+0	0
Players who appeared for Rosenborg no longer at the club:
2	DF	(Norway) NOR	Håkon Røsten	9	0	8+0	0	0+1	0	0+0	0
6	MF	(Finland) FIN	Santeri Väänänen	8	0	4+4	0	0+0	0	0+0	0
17	FW	(Iceland) ISL	Ísak Þorvaldsson	0	0	0+0	0	0+0	0	0+0	0
23	DF	(Norway) NOR	Ulrik Yttergård Jenssen	0	0	0+0	0	0+0	0	0+0	0

=== Disciplinary record ===
As of match played 7 November 2026

Number	Nation	Position	Name	Eliteserien		2025–26 Norwegian Cup		2026–27 Norwegian Cup		Total	
Number	Nation	Position	Name	Yellow card	Red card	Yellow card	Red card	Yellow card	Red card	Yellow card	Red card
1	(Sweden)	GK	Leopold Wahlstedt	3	0	0	0	0	0	3	0
3	(Norway)	MF	Tobias Dahl	2	0	0	0	0	0	2	0
4	(Norway)	DF	Mikkel Ceïde	1	0	0	0	0	0	1	0
5	(Norway)	DF	Håkon Volden	0	0	0	0	0	0	0	0
6	(Norway)	MF	Mathias Kjølø	1	0	0	0	1	0	2	0
7	(Norway)	MF	Simen Bolkan Nordli	2	0	0	0	0	0	2	0
8	(Norway)	MF	Iver Fossum	0	0	0	0	0	0	0	0
9	(Montenegro)	FW	Dino Islamović	1	0	0	0	0	0	1	0
10	(Norway)	MF	Ole Selnæs	4	0	0	0	1	0	5	0
11	(Denmark)	FW	Noah Sahsah	1	0	0	0	0	0	1	0
12	(Norway)	GK	Rasmus Sandberg	0	0	0	0	0	0	0	0
13	(Norway)	GK	David Amdam	0	0	0	0	0	0	0	0
14	(Norway)	FW	Jesper Reitan-Sunde	2	0	0	0	0	0	2	0
15	(Denmark)	DF	Jonas Mortensen	2	0	0	0	1	0	3	0
16	(Norway)	DF	Aslak Fonn Witry	5	0	0	0	0	0	5	0
17	(Denmark)	MF	Mads Bomholt	4	0	0	0	0	0	4	0
18	(Algeria)	FW	Amin Chiakha	5	0	0	0	0	0	5	0
19	(Norway)	DF	Adrian Pereira	2	0	0	0	0	0	2	0
20	(Norway)	MF	Aleksander Borgersen	0	0	0	0	0	0	0	0
21	(Slovakia)	DF	Tomáš Nemčík	5	0	0	0	1	0	6	0
22	(Norway)	DF	Jonas Svensson	3	0	0	0	0	0	3	0
23	(Ukraine)	DF	Mark Mampassi	0	0	0	0	0	0	0	0
24	(Norway)	GK	Haakon Ingdal Sørum	0	0	0	0	0	0	0	0
26	(Norway)	DF	Ulrik Hald-Hernes	0	0	0	0	0	0	0	0
28	(Norway)	MF	Elias Slørdal	0	0	0	0	0	0	0	0
29	(Slovakia)	FW	Dávid Ďuriš	2	0	0	0	0	0	2	0
30	(Slovakia)	FW	Maciej Soboczynski	1	0	0	0	0	0	1	0
35	(Norway)	FW	Emil Ceïde	2	0	0	0	0	0	2	0
37	(Norway)	DF	Boye Hedman	0	0	0	0	0	0	0	0
57	(Norway)	FW	Daniel Thorstensen	0	0	0	0	0	0	0	0
Players away from Rosenborg on loan:
30	(Norway)	FW	Magnus Holte	0	0	0	0	0	0	0	0
55	(Norway)	DF	Elias Sandrød	0	0	0	0	0	0	0	0
56	(Norway)	MF	Isak Holmen	0	0	0	0	0	0	0	0
Players who appeared for Rosenborg no longer at the club:
2	(Norway)	DF	Håkon Røsten	1	0	0	0	0	0	1	0
6	(Finland)	MF	Santeri Väänänen	0	0	0	0	0	0	0	0
17	(Iceland)	FW	Ísak Þorvaldsson	0	0	0	0	0	0	0	0
23	(Norway)	DF	Ulrik Yttergård Jenssen	0	0	0	0	0	0	0	0
			TOTALS	48	0	0	0	4	0	52	0

== See also ==
- Rosenborg BK seasons
