= Greenland national football team results (unofficial matches) =

- Win Draw Loss Void

This is a list of Greenland national football team results (unofficial matches) from 1977 to present.

== Results ==
=== 1970s ===
June 1977 Friendly	Vejle	5–8	Greenland	Denmark

June 1977 Friendly	Hobro IK	2–4	Greenland	Denmark

June 1977 Friendly	Hernings	5–0	Greenland	Denmark

June 1977 Friendly	IHF-Århus	3–2	Greenland	Denmark

=== 1980s ===
June 1989 Friendly	4. deild karla	0–8	Greenland	Iceland

June 1989 Friendly	3. deild karla	3–5	Greenland	Iceland

June 1989 Friendly	Greenland	0–2	Denmark '1986'	Nuuk, Greenland

June 1989 Friendly	Greenland	1–2	Denmark '1986'	Sisimiut, Greenland

June 1989 Friendly	Greenland	1–8	Denmark '1986'	Ilulissat, Greenland

=== 1990s ===
June 1993 Friendly	Faxe BK	0–6	Greenland	Faxe, Denmark

7 July 1995 Friendly	Faxe BK	2–3	Greenland	Faxe, Denmark

21 June 1999 Friendly	Mors-Thy	4–2	Greenland	Nykøbing Mors, Denmark

June 1999 Friendly	Skive IK	7–0	Greenland	Skive, Denmark

=== 2000s ===
28 September 2008 Friendly	Mors-Thy	1–1	Greenland	Fjerritslev, Denmark

29 September 2008 Friendly	Fjerritslev IF	0–3	Greenland	Hurup Thy, Denmark

23 June 2009 Friendly	Frederiksberg VLI	1–0	Greenland	Frederiksberg, Denmark

=== 2010s ===
2 July 2011 Friendly	Grótta	3–3	Greenland	Reykjavík, Iceland

2 July 2011 Friendly	Þróttur	1–5	Greenland	Reykjavík, Iceland

30 June 2013 Friendly	Nuuk XI	3–2	Greenland

3 July 2013 Friendly	Næsby	2–2	Greenland

4 July 2013 Friendly	Odense KFUM	0–2	Greenland

6 July 2013 Friendly	Marstal/Rise Ærø	1–3	Greenland

8 July 2013 Friendly	FC Svendborg	0–3	Greenland

19 June 2015 Hybrid friendly	Odense U19	6–1	Greenland	Tåsinge, Denmark

20 June 2015 Friendly	Tåsinge	3–2	Greenland	Tåsinge, Denmark

22 June 2015 Friendly	Marse/Riistal	0–2	Greenland	Tåsinge, Denmark

1 June 2016 Friendly	Vanløse IF	2–1	Greenland

2 June 2016 Friendly	B93	0–1	Greenland

3 June 2016 Friendly	Aarhus Fremad	5–1	Greenland

15 June 2017 Friendly	BK Frem	7–0	Greenland	Denmark

20 June 2017 Friendly	FC Nordhavn	1–4	Greenland	Denmark

22 June 2017 Friendly	Vanløse IF	1–1	Greenland	Denmark

=== 2020s ===
8 September 2021 Friendly	Vildbjerg SF	1–1	Greenland	Vildbjerg, Denmark

9 September 2021 Friendly	Midtjylland	1–1	Greenland	Vildbjerg, Denmark

11 September 2021 Friendly	Ikast FC	0–0	Greenland	Vildbjerg, Denmark

12 September 2021 Friendly	Inter Allies	5–0	Greenland	Vildbjerg, Denmark

14 September 2021 Friendly	Nordsjælland	4–1	Greenland	Farum, Denmark
		Report	Karsten Andersen

19 September 2022 Friendly	Greenland	1–6	Al-Kahrabaa	Kemer, Turkey
	Nemo Thomsen ?' (pen.)	Report

21 September 2022 Friendly	Greenland	0–6	Iraq XI	Kemer, Turkey

3 June 2024 Friendly	Kalekapısı (Turkey)	0–9	Greenland	Antalya, Turkey
		Report	Thomsen,, Kreuzmann, Philbert, Eriksen; Christensen

5 June 2024 Friendly	Antalya 1863 (Turkey)	1–7	Greenland	Antalya, Turkey
		Report	Adam Ejler Hansen; Nemo Thomsen,, Niklas Thustrup; Niels-Erik Eriksen; Søren Kreutzmann

31 May 2026 Friendly	Friuli	5–0	Greenland	Manzano,Italy
				Stadium: Polisportivo Comunale
