= Greenland at the European Championships =

- Medals: Gold 0 Silver 0 Bronze 0 Total 0

European Championships appearances (overview)
- 2018; 2022

Greenland has competed in the European Championships since the second event in 2022.

== Medal count ==
Games	Athletes	Gold	Silver	Bronze	Total
(United Kingdom) / (Germany) 2018 Glasgow and Berlin	Did not participate				
(Germany) 2022 Munich (details)	1	0	0	0	0
Total		0	0	0	0

== See also ==
- Sport in Greenland
