= Iceland national football team head to head =

National football team statistics

== All–time record against all nations ==
As of 16 November 2026

This is a list of Icelandic national team complete records, both friendlies and competitive matches, as reported on. Countries that are in italics are not members of FIFA or are former countries.

UEFA
| Against | Played | Won | Drawn | Lost | GF | GA | GD |
|---|---|---|---|---|---|---|---|
| Albania | 9 | 4 | 2 | 3 | 12 | 11 | +1 |
| Andorra | 6 | 6 | 0 | 0 | 16 | 0 | +16 |
| Armenia | 5 | 2 | 2 | 1 | 5 | 3 | +2 |
| Austria | 4 | 1 | 2 | 1 | 4 | 4 | 0 |
| Azerbaijan | 3 | 2 | 1 | 0 | 8 | 1 | +7 |
| Belarus | 1 | 0 | 0 | 1 | 0 | 2 | −2 |
| Belgium | 13 | 0 | 0 | 13 | 8 | 44 | −36 |
| Bosnia and Herzegovina | 2 | 1 | 0 | 1 | 1 | 3 | −2 |
| Bulgaria | 7 | 2 | 1 | 4 | 5 | 12 | +3 |
| Croatia | 7 | 1 | 1 | 5 | 3 | 13 | −10 |
| Cyprus | 7 | 3 | 3 | 1 | 6 | 3 | +3 |
| Czech Republic | 6 | 2 | 0 | 4 | 8 | 12 | −4 |
| Czechoslovakia | 5 | 0 | 1 | 4 | 3 | 11 | −8 |
| Denmark | 24 | 0 | 4 | 20 | 15 | 67 | −52 |
| East Germany | 14 | 2 | 1 | 11 | 7 | 31 | −24 |
| England | 6 | 2 | 1 | 3 | 5 | 13 | −8 |
| Estonia | 9 | 3 | 5 | 1 | 11 | 5 | +6 |
| Faroe Islands | 26 | 24 | 1 | 1 | 71 | 13 | +58 |
| Finland | 14 | 4 | 3 | 7 | 15 | 21 | −6 |
| France | 17 | 0 | 5 | 12 | 15 | 46 | −31 |
| Georgia | 1 | 1 | 0 | 0 | 3 | 1 | +2 |
| Germany | 6 | 0 | 1 | 5 | 1 | 18 | −17 |
| Greece | 3 | 1 | 0 | 2 | 3 | 4 | −1 |
| Hungary | 12 | 3 | 1 | 9 | 13 | 26 | −13 |
| Ireland | 9 | 1 | 3 | 5 | 8 | 14 | −6 |
| Israel | 6 | 1 | 3 | 2 | 12 | 12 | 0 |
| Italy | 2 | 1 | 1 | 0 | 2 | 0 | +2 |
| Kazakhstan | 2 | 1 | 1 | 0 | 3 | 0 | +3 |
| Kosovo | 4 | 2 | 0 | 2 | 6 | 6 | 0 |
| Latvia | 7 | 2 | 3 | 2 | 12 | 12 | 0 |
| Liechtenstein | 11 | 8 | 2 | 1 | 35 | 6 | +29 |
| Lithuania | 5 | 2 | 2 | 1 | 6 | 2 | +4 |
| Luxembourg | 11 | 6 | 4 | 1 | 18 | 9 | +9 |
| Macedonia | 6 | 1 | 2 | 3 | 5 | 9 | −4 |
| Malta | 15 | 11 | 1 | 3 | 33 | 10 | +23 |
| Moldova | 2 | 2 | 0 | 0 | 5 | 1 | +4 |
| Montenegro | 3 | 2 | 0 | 1 | 5 | 2 | +3 |
| Netherlands | 15 | 2 | 2 | 11 | 9 | 40 | −31 |
| Northern Ireland | 7 | 4 | 0 | 3 | 7 | 7 | 0 |
| Norway | 34 | 7 | 6 | 21 | 34 | 65 | −31 |
| Poland | 7 | 0 | 2 | 5 | 7 | 15 | −8 |
| Portugal | 5 | 0 | 1 | 4 | 5 | 12 | −7 |
| Romania | 5 | 1 | 1 | 3 | 2 | 11 | −9 |
| Russia | 6 | 1 | 1 | 4 | 2 | 8 | −6 |
| San Marino | 1 | 1 | 0 | 0 | 1 | 0 | +1 |
| Scotland | 7 | 1 | 0 | 6 | 6 | 13 | −7 |
| Soviet Union | 8 | 0 | 3 | 5 | 4 | 15 | −11 |
| Slovakia | 7 | 1 | 1 | 5 | 9 | 16 | −7 |
| Slovenia | 4 | 1 | 0 | 3 | 7 | 15 | −8 |
| Spain | 10 | 1 | 2 | 7 | 6 | 15 | −9 |
| Sweden | 17 | 2 | 3 | 12 | 18 | 39 | −21 |
| Switzerland | 6 | 0 | 1 | 6 | 6 | 19 | −13 |
| Turkey | 15 | 8 | 3 | 4 | 26 | 18 | +8 |
| Ukraine | 7 | 1 | 2 | 4 | 8 | 12 | –4 |
| Wales | 9 | 1 | 2 | 6 | 8 | 19 | −11 |
| Total | 460 | 136 | 87 | 239 | 563 | 786 | −223 |

AFC
| Against | Played | Won | Drawn | Lost | GF | GA | GD |
|---|---|---|---|---|---|---|---|
| Bahrain | 2 | 1 | 0 | 1 | 3 | 2 | +1 |
| China | 1 | 1 | 0 | 0 | 2 | 0 | +2 |
| India | 1 | 1 | 0 | 0 | 3 | 0 | +3 |
| Indonesia | 1 | 1 | 0 | 0 | 4 | 1 | +3 |
| Iran | 1 | 0 | 0 | 1 | 0 | 1 | −1 |
| Japan | 4 | 0 | 0 | 4 | 3 | 9 | −6 |
| Kuwait | 7 | 2 | 4 | 1 | 4 | 3 | +1 |
| Qatar | 2 | 0 | 2 | 0 | 3 | 3 | 0 |
| Saudi Arabia | 6 | 1 | 2 | 3 | 3 | 6 | −3 |
| South Korea | 2 | 0 | 0 | 2 | 1 | 6 | −5 |
| United Arab Emirates | 3 | 2 | 0 | 1 | 3 | 2 | +1 |
| Total | 30 | 9 | 8 | 13 | 29 | 33 | −4 |

CONCACAF
| Against | Played | Won | Drawn | Lost | GF | GA | GD |
|---|---|---|---|---|---|---|---|
| Bermuda | 4 | 3 | 0 | 1 | 12 | 7 | +5 |
| Canada | 5 | 2 | 3 | 0 | 7 | 5 | +2 |
| El Salvador | 1 | 1 | 0 | 0 | 1 | 0 | +1 |
| Guatemala | 1 | 1 | 0 | 0 | 1 | 0 | +1 |
| Haiti | 1 | 0 | 1 | 0 | 1 | 1 | 0 |
| Honduras | 1 | 1 | 0 | 0 | 2 | 0 | +2 |
| Mexico | 6 | 0 | 2 | 4 | 1 | 10 | −1 |
| Trinidad and Tobago | 1 | 0 | 0 | 1 | 0 | 2 | −2 |
| United States | 7 | 2 | 2 | 3 | 9 | 12 | −3 |
| Total | 26 | 10 | 8 | 8 | 34 | 37 | −3 |

CONMEBOL
| Against | Played | Won | Drawn | Lost | GF | GA | GD |
|---|---|---|---|---|---|---|---|
| Argentina | 2 | 0 | 1 | 1 | 1 | 4 | –3 |
| Bolivia | 1 | 1 | 0 | 0 | 1 | 0 | +1 |
| Brazil | 2 | 0 | 0 | 2 | 1 | 9 | −8 |
| Chile | 3 | 0 | 1 | 2 | 1 | 4 | −3 |
| Peru | 1 | 0 | 0 | 1 | 1 | 3 | −2 |
| Uruguay | 1 | 0 | 0 | 1 | 1 | 2 | −1 |
| Venezuela | 1 | 1 | 0 | 0 | 1 | 0 | +1 |
| Total | 10 | 2 | 1 | 7 | 6 | 21 | −15 |

CAF
| Against | Played | Won | Drawn | Lost | GF | GA | GD |
|---|---|---|---|---|---|---|---|
| Ghana | 1 | 0 | 1 | 0 | 2 | 2 | +0 |
| Nigeria | 2 | 1 | 0 | 1 | 3 | 2 | +1 |
| South Africa | 3 | 2 | 1 | 0 | 6 | 2 | +4 |
| Tunisia | 1 | 0 | 0 | 1 | 1 | 3 | −2 |
| Uganda | 1 | 0 | 1 | 0 | 1 | 1 | +0 |
| Total | 8 | 3 | 3 | 2 | 13 | 10 | +3 |

ConIFA
| Against | Played | Won | Drawn | Lost | GF | GA | GD |
|---|---|---|---|---|---|---|---|
| Greenland | 2 | 2 | 0 | 0 | 5 | 1 | +4 |
| Total | 2 | 2 | 0 | 0 | 5 | 1 | +4 |

All Confederations
| All Games | Played | Won | Drawn | Lost | GF | GA | GD |
| Total | 534 | 161 | 108 | 267 | 645 | 881 | −236 |
