= 1997–98 Danish Cup =

Tournament details
- Country: Denmark

Final positions
- Champions: Brøndby IF
- Runners-up: F.C. Copenhagen

The 1997–98 Danish Cup was the 44th season of the Danish Cup, the highest football competition in Denmark. The final was played on 21 May 1998.

== First round ==
Team 1	Score	Team 2
Herlev IF	1–0	Døllefjelde-Musse IF
Kalundborg GB	9–3	Frederikssund IK
Vordingborg IF	0–1	Nykøbing FA
Slagelse B&I	2–2 (a.e.t.) (2–4 p)	B 1908
Aarslev BK	1–5	AC Horsens
Allested U&IF	1–1 (a.e.t.) (3–1 p)	Ringkøbing IF
Bindslev-Tversted IF	2–2 (a.e.t.) (4–2 p)	Aabyhøj IF
IF Skjold Birkerød	2–1	Valby BK
Dalum IF	2–3	Vorup Frederiksberg BK
Esbjerg IF 92	1–1 (a.e.t.) (5–4 p)	Kolding IF
Hadsund BK	2–2 (a.e.t.) (6–5 p)	Brande IF
Hammerum IF	0–3	Skive IK
Kastrup BK	3–2	Helsingør IF
Lemvig GF	0–2	Vejen SF
Lindholm IF	2–1	Næsby BK
Mørkøv IF	4–2	Jægersborg BK
Nørre Snede GF	0–4	B 1909
Nyborg G&IF	2–4	Skovshoved IF
Politiets IF	1–8	Holbæk B&I
IK Skovbakken	0–4	Aalborg Chang
Sankt Klemens Fangel IF	0–4	Holstebro BK
Store Restrup IF	2–3	Randers Freja
AIK 65 Strøby	2–5	Hellerup IK
IF Skjold Sæby	1–2 (a.e.t.)	Nørresundby BK
Sønderborg BK	0–1	B 1913
Tønder SF	1–5	Søndermarkens IF
BK Velo	2–2 (a.e.t.) (4–3 p)	Rødby fB
BK Viktoria	1–1 (a.e.t.) (3–1 p)	Vanløse IF
Virum/Sorgenfri BK	3–0	Farum BK
VLI Frederiksberg IF	2–1	Ringsted IF
IF Skjold Skævinge	3–2 (a.e.t.)	BK Frem
IK Viking Rønne	1–2	Tårup IF

== Second round ==
Team 1	Score	Team 2
AC Horsens	3–2	FC Fredericia
Allested U&IF	0–3	Randers Freja
B 1908	2–1	Ølstykke FC
B 1909	3–0	Haderslev FK
B 1913	0–3	Aalborg Chang
IF Skjold Birkerød	2–2 (a.e.t.) (5–3 p)	Køge BK
Esbjerg IF 92	1–2	Holstebro BK
Hadsund BK	2–0	Vorup Frederiksberg BK
Herlev IF	1–3	Fremad Amager
Hellerup IK	4–0	Nykøbing FA
Kastrup BK	3–2	Roskilde BK
Mørkøv IF	1–2	Skovshoved IF
IF Skjold Skævinge	2–3 (a.e.t.)	Brønshøj BK
Søndermarkens IF	0:1	Lindholm IF
BK Velo	0–2 (a.e.t.)	Vejen SF
BK Viktoria	1–2	Tårup IF
VLI Frederiksberg IF	0–3	Virum/Sorgenfri BK
Holbæk B&I	2–6	BK Avarta
Bindslev-Tversted IF	2–4	Skive IK
Nørresundby BK	3–0	Kalundborg GB

== Third round ==
Team 1	Score	Team 2
BK Avarta	2–0 (a.e.t.)	Fremad Amager
B 1909	3–2 (a.e.t.)	Holstebro BK
IF Skjold Birkerød	3:0	B 1908
Esbjerg fB	1–2	Viborg FF
Hadsund BK	2–5	AC Horsens
Hellerup IK	3–3 (a.e.t.) (6–7 p)	Glostrup IF 32
Kastrup BK	2–2 (a.e.t.) (3–4 p)	B.93
Lindholm IF	1–3	Skive IK
Næstved BK	0–1 (a.e.t.)	Brønshøj BK
Nørresundby BK	1–5	Herning Fremad
Tårup IF	0–8	Hvidovre IF
Virum/Sorgenfri BK	1–3	Skovshoved IF
Aalborg Chang	2–1 (a.e.t.)	Vejen SF
Randers Freja	2–2 (a.e.t.) (2–3 p)	Svendborg fB

== Fourth round ==
Team 1	Score	Team 2
B 1909	1–3	Lyngby BK
IF Skjold Birkerød	3–0	Skive IK
Brønshøj BK	0–4	B.93
Glostrup IF 32	0–0 (a.e.t.) (2–4 p)	F.C. Copenhagen
Skovshoved IF	3–2	Herning Fremad
Svendborg fB	2–3	Hvidovre IF
Aarhus Fremad	3–0	BK Avarta
AC Horsens	1–2	Viborg FF
Odense BK	2–0	AB
Aalborg Chang	1–2	Ikast FS

== Fifth round ==
Team 1	Score	Team 2
B.93	0–2	F.C. Copenhagen
IF Skjold Birkerød	1–3	Herfølge BK
Ikast FS	2–1	Viborg FF
Skovshoved IF	0–6	Brøndby IF
Vejle BK	1–2	AaB
Aarhus Fremad	1–4	Lyngby BK
Silkeborg IF	3–0	Hvidovre IF
Odense BK	0–1	AGF

== Quarter-finals ==
Team 1	Score	Team 2
Brøndby IF	2–0	AaB
Ikast FS	3–2 (a.e.t.)	Herfølge BK
F.C. Copenhagen	3–1 (a.e.t.)	AGF
Silkeborg IF	1–1 (a.e.t.) (4–2 p)	Lyngby BK

== Semi-finals ==
Team 1	Agg.	Team 2	1st leg	2nd leg
Brøndby IF	4–1	Silkeborg IF	2–1	2–0
F.C. Copenhagen	9–2	Ikast FS	4–1	5–1

== Final ==
21 May 1998

Brøndby IF	4–1	F.C. Copenhagen
Hansen 4'; Sand 32'; Thygesen 53'; Christensen 82'	Report	Nielsen 36'

Parken Stadium, Copenhagen
Attendance: 41,044
Referee: Claus Bo Larsen
