= Sport in Greenland =

Sports traditions in Greenland

Sport is an important part of Greenlandic culture, as the population is generally quite active. The main traditional sport in Greenland is Arctic sports.

Popular sports include association football, track and field, badminton, handball, golf, and skiing. Handball is often referred to as the national sport, and Greenland's men's national team was ranked among the top 20 in the world in 2001.

Greenland has excellent conditions for skiing, cross country skiing, kayaking, fishing, snowboarding, ice climbing, ice skating, and rock climbing, although mountain climbing, mountain biking, and hiking are preferred by the general public. Although the country's environment is generally ill-suited for golf, there are nevertheless golf courses on the island. Greenland hosted a biennial international, the world's largest multisport and cultural event for young people of the Arctic, for the second time in 2016.

Golf in Greenland is mostly played on gravel and sand, but also on grass or on simulators in the wintertime.

== Football ==
The Football Association of Greenland (Kalaallit Nunaanni Arsaattartut Kattuffia), has a national football team but is not yet a member of FIFA because of ongoing disagreements with FIFA leadership and an inability to grow grass for regulation grass pitches. As a constituent country of the Kingdom of Denmark, the Danish men's and women's teams represent Greenland as well (although not the Faroe Islands). However, it is the 17th member of the N.F.-Board. DBU president Jesper Møller visited Greenland in 2015 and the Danish and Greenlandic associations signed a cooperation agreement which aims to encourage the game at grass roots level and build four to six artificial pitches. The FIFA Goal programme sponsored the Qaqortoq Stadium in Qaqortoq, which has an artificial grass pitch. Greenland holds the Greenlandic Football Championship annually. They previously held the event known as the Greenland Cup. They also are a member of CONIFA and compete in the Island games Football, finishing as runners-up to Bermuda in 2013.

== Skiing ==
The oldest sport association in Greenland is the Greenland Ski Federation (GIF), founded in 1969. This happened when the then-President of the GIF Daniel Switching took the initiative to found federations and institute reforms. Greenland Ski Federation is further divided into Alpine and cross-country selection committees. The federation is not a member of the International Ski Federation (FIS), but Greenland skiers participated in the Olympics and World Championships under the Danish flag at the 1968, 1994, 1998 and 2014 games.

== Arctic sports ==
Greenland competes in the biennial Arctic Winter Games (AWG). In 2002, Nuuk hosted the AWG in conjunction with Iqaluit, Nunavut. In 1994 and again in 2002, they won the Hodgson Trophy for fair play.

== Other sports ==
Greenland takes part in the biennial Island Games, organized by the International Island Games Association.

Greenland took part in the 2007 World Men's Handball Championship in Germany, finishing 22nd in a field of 24 national teams.

Greenland took part in badminton in the European Men's & Women's Team Championships in 2018 and won the first match ever in international badminton team championships against Hungary.

Greenland took part in the table tennis event at the multi-sport 2022 European Championships in Munich, Germany.

== Membership of international sports federations ==
Greenland has gained membership of, or is in the process of applying to join, the following federations:

Entity	Notes	Status
Arctic Winter Games International Committee	Greenland participates in the Arctic Winter Games.	Member
Badminton World Federation (BWF)	The Greenland Badminton Federation is a full member of BWF and Badminton Europe.	Member
International Biathlon Union (IBU)	The Greenland Biathlon Federation is a full member of IBU.	Member
Confederation of North, Central America and Caribbean Association Football (CONCACAF)	The Greenland Football Association applied to join CONCACAF, a continental body of FIFA, in June 2022.	Applicant
International Handball Federation (IHF)	The Greenland Handball Federation is a member of IHF and the North America and the Caribbean Handball Confederation.	Member
International Island Games Association (IIGA)	Greenland is a member of the IIGA and participates in the Island Games.	Member
International Table Tennis Federation (ITTF)	The Greenland Table Tennis Federation is a full member of ITTF and the European Table Tennis Union.	Member
