= ANT Nations Cup 2025 =

2025 ANT Nations Cup

Tournament details
- Host country: Austria
- City: Neunkirchen, Ternitz, & Traiskirchen
- Dates: 6–8 October
- Teams: 5 (from 1 confederation)
- Venue: 3 (in 3 host cities)

Final positions
- Champions: Austria Amateurs (1st title)
- Runners-up: Slovenia Amateurs
- Third place: Greenland

Tournament statistics
- Matches played: 4
- Goals scored: 23 (5.75 per match)
- Best player: (Austria) Ben Leitenstorfer

The Amateur National Teams Nations Cup 2025 was an international association football tournament for amateur national teams held in Austria from 6-8 October 2025. It was the first international football tournament for amateur national teams in forty-five years. Austria were the eventual winners. All matches were played in the Lower Austrian towns of Neunkirchen, Ternitz, and Traiskirchen.

== History ==
Sometime in the 1980s, the tradition of playing amateur international matches ended. The tradition was revived in 2023 when the Austria amateurs defeated Slovenia amateurs 1–0 in Klagenfurt with a goal from Thomas Herrklotz. A second friendly was played between the two nations in April 2024. The initiative was furthered in 2025 with the announcement of the inaugural Amateur National Teams Nations Cup to be played in Austria from 6-8 October. The tournament would mark the first competition of its kind in over forty-five years and feature Bosnia-Herzegovina's first amateur selection since the country gained independence in 1992. Originally scheduled to be played in June 2025, the tournament was approved by the participating national football associations since the competition would be outside of FIFA.

With victories over Greenland and Bosnia and Herzegovina, hosts Austria won the championship on goal differential after tying on points with Slovenia. Austria's Ben Leitensdorfer from SV Seekirchen 1945 was named player of the tournament with three goals in two matches. Austria was led by SC Kalsdorf manager Jörg Schirgi in the tournament.

== Table ==
Pos	Team	Pld	W	D	L	GF	GA	GD	Pts	Qualification
1	Austria Amateurs	2	2	0	0	8	2	+6	6	Champion
2	Slovenia Amateurs	2	2	0	0	9	4	+5	6	
3	Greenland	2	0	0	2	4	9	−5	0	
4	Bosnia and Herzegovina Amateurs	2	0	0	2	1	7	−6	0	

First match(es) will be played: 8 October 2025. Source:

== Matches ==
6 October	Slovenia Amateurs	4–0	Bosnia and Herzegovina Amateurs	Ternitz, Austria
				Stadium: Ternitzer Stadion

6 October	Austria Amateurs	5–1	Greenland	Neunkirchen, Austria
		Report		Stadium: Städtische Sportanlage

8 October	Slovenia Amateurs	5–4	Greenland	Traiskirchen, Austria
		Report	Rene Eriksen Petersen, Mathias Christensen; Nemo Thomsen	Stadium: Sportzentrum Traiskirchen

8 October	Austria Amateurs	5–4	Bosnia and Herzegovina Amateurs	Traiskirchen, Austria
				Stadium: Sportzentrum Traiskirchen
