= Mads Bomholt =

Danish footballer (born 2005)

Personal information
- Full name: Mads Bomholt
- Date of birth: 30 December 2005 (age 20)
- Place of birth: Hadsund, Denmark
- Position: Midfielder

Team information
- Current team: Rosenborg
- Number: 17

Youth career
- –2017: Hadsund BK
- 2017–2024: AaB

Senior career*
Years	Team	Apps	(Gls)
2023–2026	AaB	64	(5)
2026–	Rosenborg	26	(3)

International career
2024	Denmark U19	6	(2)
2024–	Denmark U20	3	(0)
- * Club domestic league appearances and goals as of 22 November 2026

Mads Bomholt (born 30 December 2005) is a Danish professional footballer who plays as midfielder for Eliteserien club Rosenborg BK.

== Career ==
=== AaB ===
Bomholt joined AaB at the age of 11 from partner club Hadsund Boldklub in 2017, where he had played since the age of 4. At AaB, Bomholt played his way up through the club's youth academy and in July 2023, the 17-year old midfielder was rewarded with a new contract until June 2026, after a good start with the first team squad during the pre-season and a call-up for the first league game of the season, although he was on the bench.

On 6 August 2023 Bomholt made his debut for AaB when he replaced Nicklas Helenius in the 83rd minute in a Danish 1st Division match against FC Fredericia. Not many days later, on August 15, 2023, he made his first start for AaB in a cup match against Egen UI.

In his first season for AaB, the young Bomholt made 17 appearances, contributing to AaB's promotion to the 2024-25 Danish Superliga. In May 2024, the club also confirmed that they had extended Bomholt's contract again, this time until June 2028, and Bomholt was also permanently promoted to the first team squad. In addition, Bomholt was also called up for the Danish U19 national team to play 2024 UEFA European Under-19 Championship

=== Rosenborg ===
On 2 February 2026, Bomholt signed with Norwegian Eliteserien side Rosenborg BK, joining the club on a contract until 30 June 2029.

== Career statistics ==
=== Club ===
As of match played 22 November 2026

Appearances and goals by club, season and competition
Club	Season	League			Cup		Europe		Other		Total	
Club	Season	Division	Apps	Goals	Apps	Goals	Apps	Goals	Apps	Goals	Apps	Goals
AaB	2023–24	Danish 1st Division	17	0	2	0	0	0	—		19	0
AaB	2024–25	Danish Superliga	29	3	4	1	0	0	0	0	33	4
AaB	2025–26	Danish 1st Division	18	2	3	1	0	0	—		21	3
AaB	Total		64	5	9	2	0	0	—		73	7
Rosenborg	2026	Eliteserien	26	3	4	1	0	0	0	0	30	4
Career total			90	8	13	3	0	0	0	0	103	11
