= Nemo Thomsen =

Greenlandic footballer (born 2004)

Personal information
- Date of birth: 5 April 2004 (age 22)
- Place of birth: Ilulissat, Greenland
- Position: Centre-forward

Team information
- Current team: Fredericia

Youth career
- Nagdlunguaq-48
- 2019–2021: SønderjyskE
- 2021–2023: Kolding IF

Senior career*
Years	Team	Apps	(Gls)
2018–2019	Nagdlunguaq-48		
2023	Kolding IF	0	(0)
2023–2024	Young Boys FD	13	(1)
2024	IF Lyseng	9	(0)
2024–2025	Holbæk B&I	17	(4)
2025–2026	Brabrand IF	30	(12)
2026–	Fredericia	0	(0)

International career^{‡}
2022–	Greenland	6	(7)
- * Club domestic league appearances and goals as of 18 June 2026 ‡ National team caps and goals as of 18:24, 8 October 2025 (UTC)

Nemo Thomsen (born 5 April 2004) is a Greenlandic professional footballer who currently plays for 1st Division club FC Fredericia and the Greenland national team.

== Club career ==
Thomsen is from Ilulissat, Greenland. During the 2018 Greenlandic Football Championship he scored a hattrick for Nagdlunguaq-48 at age fourteen to become the youngest goalscorer in the tournament.

In 2019 he moved to Southern Jutland in Denmark for more footballing opportunities. Shortly thereafter he began playing for the academy of SønderjyskE while living with a host family for six months before moving into player housing on Louisevej. Following his move to Kolding IF, Thomsen made his debut for the U17 side on 1 April 2021 in a spring season 3–0 victory over Næstved U17.

In February 2023, Thomsen saw minutes for Kolding's senior squad as part of a training camp held in Turkey. Kolding IF faced clubs from Latvia, Denmark, and Bosnia and Herzegovina during the camp. He ended the 2023 season as the under-19 league's top scorer with 25 goals. Kolding IF became went on to win the league title that season. Following the impressive performance, Thomsen signed his first senior contract with the club for the 2023–24 season.

On 8 August 2023, Thomsen scored a hattrick in a 19–1 victory over FC Avrasya in the 2023–24 Danish Cup. The result set a new all-time record for the largest margin of victory in the Danish Cup. Later that month, it was announced Nemo had left Kolding and joined Young Boys FD of the Danish 3rd Division in search of more playing time. He scored for the club to secure a 1–1 draw and a point in a league match against Holbæk B&I. In February 2024 it was announced that Thomsen had departed the club after half a season, following a trial at Holbæk B&I the previous month.

In summer 2025, Thomsen joined newly promoted Danish 2nd Division club Brabrand IF. He debuted for the club on 2 August against VSK Aarhus as a substitute. He made his first league start for the club on 16 August against Akademisk Boldklub. He scored his team's only goal in the match, earning Man of the Match honours despite his team's 1–2 defeat.

On 26 June 2026, Thomsen joined Danish 1st Division side FC Fredericia on a four-year contract, becoming the first ever male Greenlandic player to sign a professional football contract.

== International career ==
Thomsen represented Greenland in futsal at the 2018 Arctic Winter Games in Canada's Northwest Territories. Going into the semi-finals, he was the juvenile male division's top scorer in the competition with eighteen goals. He finished the tournament as top scorer with twenty-two goals, more than twice the number scored by any other single player, as Greenland beat Yamalo-Nenets in the final to win the gold medal.

He received his first call up to the Greenland national football team by head coach Morten Rutkjær in October 2020. At 16 years old, he was the youngest player in the 40-man squad. In August 2021, Rutkjær named Thomsen to the 24-man squad that would train and compete against several Danish clubs in Denmark the following month. Thomsen was one of two Denmark-based players in the squad, along with Adam Ejler of HB Køge.

He was then part of the roster for Greenland's first match against an official national team after beginning the process of joining CONCACAF, a hybrid friendly match against Kosovo U21 to be played in Turkey in September 2022. In the opening match of the training camp, Thomsen converted a penalty for Greenland's only goal in a 1–6 defeat to Al-Kahrabaa of the Iraqi Premier League. The following year, Thomsen was the second-top scorer with six goals in four matches at the 2023 Island Games. He finished one goal behind Jake Scrimshaw of the Isle of Wight who played one more match than Greenland.

Thomsen was recalled to the national team in May 2024 for another training camp in Turkey. As part of the camp, Greenland would play several matches, including one against Turkmenistan.

== Career statistics ==
=== Club ===
Appearances and goals by club, season and competition
Club	Season	League			National Cup		Other		Total	
Club	Season	Division	Apps	Goals	Apps	Goals	Apps	Goals	Apps	Goals

=== International ===
List of international goals scored by Nemo Thomsen
No.	Date	Venue	Opponent	Score	Result	Competition
1	9 July 2023	Blanche Pierre Lane, Saint Martin, Guernsey	Orkney	1–1	2–2	2023 Island Games
2	9 July 2023	Blanche Pierre Lane, Saint Martin, Guernsey	Orkney	2–2	2–2	2023 Island Games
3	10 July 2023	Northfield Stadium, Saint Sampson, Guernsey	Frøya	2–0	2–0	2023 Island Games
4	11 July 2023	The Corbet Field, Saint Sampson, Guernsey	Bermuda U23	1–1	2–3	2023 Island Games
5	11 July 2023	The Corbet Field, Saint Sampson, Guernsey	Bermuda U23	2–2	2–3	2023 Island Games
6	13 July 2023	The Corbet Field, Saint Sampson, Guernsey	Shetland	1–2	1–5	2023 Island Games
7	8 October 2025	Sportzentrum Traiskirchen, Traiskirchen, Austria	Slovenia Amateurs	–	4–5	ANT Nations Cup 2025

== Personal ==
Thomsen is the son of former Greenlandic international Niels Thomsen. His brother, Paluu, also plays for the academy of Kolding IF.
