= Greenland Cup =

- Founded: 1980
- Abolished: 1984
- Region: North America
- Teams: Varied
- Most championships: Faroe Islands; Iceland (2 titles each)

The Greenland Cup (Danish: Grønlands Cup, Greenlandic: Kalaallit Nunaat Imertarfik) was an association football friendly round-robin tournament controlled by the Football Association of Greenland. The Greenland National Football Team competed as a regular in its short-lived running. Despite being the representing country, Greenland never won the Greenland Cup. It ran from 1980 to 1984, with 3 tournaments overall.

It was contested by the Greenland, Faroe Islands and Iceland senior male national teams who, at the time, were not affiliated with FIFA. The Faroe Islands and Iceland were the only teams to win the tournament. Both countries have since gone on to become UEFA and FIFA members.

== Overview ==
The Greenland Cup tournament was created in 1980. The tournament used knock-out rules or a round robin system. The tournament matches did not have extra time, nor did they go to a penalty shootout. Matches were replayed if drawn, as in the 1983 final.

The first tournament was held in Sauðárkrókur, Akureyri and Húsavík, Iceland. The hosts beat the Faroe Islands 2–1 in the first match, on 30 June 1980. Greenland lost their first game 6–0 to the Faroes, and, in the last match, Iceland's national team beat Greenland 4-1 – Iceland's Marteinn Geirsson, Páll Ólafsson, Lárus Guðmundsson, and Guðmundur Steinsson scored a goal each, however, Greenland forward Kristofer Ludvigsen scored the last goal.

Two years after the first edition, 1983 saw the second Greenland Cup. The match for the cup between Greenland and the Faroe Islands ended in a 0–0 draw. The match was then replayed several days later. The rematch saw the Faroe Islands beating Greenland in a close 3–2 victory in the Greenland capital city of Nuuk.

The third and last Greenland Cup tournament was in 1984, when Iceland made a comeback to the tournament. Greenland lost to both the Faroe Islands and Iceland in 1-0 results, putting Greenland in third place. The Faroe Islands and Iceland met in the final, sharing the cup after the match came to a draw. After this tournament, the Greenland Cup was abolished due to a lack of quality from Greenland's national team.

Year	Host	Winner	Runner-up	Third place
1980; Details	Iceland	Iceland	Faroe Islands	Greenland
1983; Details	Greenland	Faroe Islands	Greenland	—N/a
1984; Details	Faroe Islands	Iceland and Faroe Islands		Greenland

1. The first 1983 Greenland Cup final ended in a 0–0 result between Faroe Islands and Greenland, so the match was replayed.

== 1980 ==
Team	Pld	W	D	L	GF	GA	GD	Pts
Iceland (H)	2	2	0	0	6	2	+4	4
Faroe Islands	2	1	0	1	7	2	+5	2
Greenland	2	0	0	2	1	10	−9	0

30 June 1980

Iceland	2–1	Faroe Islands

Sauðárkrókur
2 July 1980

Faroe Islands	6–0	Greenland
Nolsøe 33', 79', 82', 88'; Petersen 71'; Vagalid 78'

Sauðárkrókur
3 July 1980

Iceland	4–1	Greenland
Godmundsson 23'; Olfsson 32'; Gerisson 34'; Steirsson 36'		Nolsøe 49'

Sauðárkrókur

== 1983 ==
Team	Pld	W	D	L	GF	GA	GD	Pts
Faroe Islands	2	1	1	0	3	2	+1	3
Greenland (H)	2	0	1	1	2	3	–1	1

29 June 1983

Greenland	0–0	Faroe Islands

Nuuk
3 July 1983

Greenland	2–3	Faroe Islands
Kreutzmann 5'; Sandgreen 60'		Davidson 25'; Christiansen 30'; Højgaard 45'

Nuuk

== 1984 ==
Team	Pld	W	D	L	GF	GA	GD	Pts
Iceland	2	1	1	0	1	0	+1	3
Faroe Islands (H)	2	1	1	0	1	0	+1	3
Greenland	2	0	0	2	0	2	−2	0

1 August 1984

Faroe Islands	0–0	Iceland

Klaksvík
3 August 1984

Greenland	0–1	Iceland

Klaksvík
5 August 1984

Faroe Islands	1–0	Greenland

Klaksvík

=== Post-tournament friendly ===
7 August 1984

Faroe Islands	4–2	Greenland
		Kreutzmann

Tórshavn

== Goalscorers ==
4 goals

- (Faroe Islands) Asmund Nolsøe

3 goals

- (Greenland) Kresten Kreutzmann

1 goal

- (Faroe Islands) Kristian Petersen
- (Faroe Islands) Samuel Vagalid
- (Faroe Islands) Niels Davidson
- (Faroe Islands) Eydun Dahl Christiansen
- (Faroe Islands) Aksel Højgaard
- (Greenland) Kristoffer Ludvigsen
- (Greenland) Lars Sandgreen
- (Iceland) Larus Godmundsson
- (Iceland) Paul Olfsson
- (Iceland) Martinus Gerisson
- (Iceland) Godmund Steirsson

== See also ==
- Association football in Greenland
- Greenlandic Football Championship
- List of association football competitions
- Sport in Greenland
- Island games
- FIFI Wild Cup
- Games of the Small States of Europe
