= Jens Tang Olesen =

Danish football manager (born 1947)

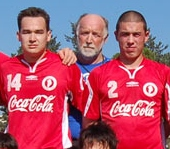
- Olesen (center) of manager of Greenland in 2006

Personal information
- Full name: Jens Tang Olesen
- Date of birth: 27 September 1947 (age 79)
- Place of birth: Denmark

Team information
- Current team: Greenland (manager)

Managerial career
- Years: Team
- 1974–1977: Skive IK
- 1980–1984: Herning Fremad
- 1984–1987: Viborg FF
- 1988–1989: B 1913
- 1990–1994: Frederikshavn fI
- 1996–1997: Randers Freja
- 2000–2001: Nørresundby BK
- 2002–2010: Greenland
- 2003: FC Aarhus
- 2004: Vejle BK

Jens Tang Olesen (born 27 September 1947) is a Danish football manager. He was most recently in charge of the Greenland national football team

He has previously managed Viborg FF, Randers Freja, FC Aarhus and Vejle Boldklub.

In 2003, he was briefly Director of Sports at FC Aarhus.

In 1982, he was named Danish Football Manager of the Year in 1982.
