= Ole Selnæs =

Norwegian footballer (born 1994)

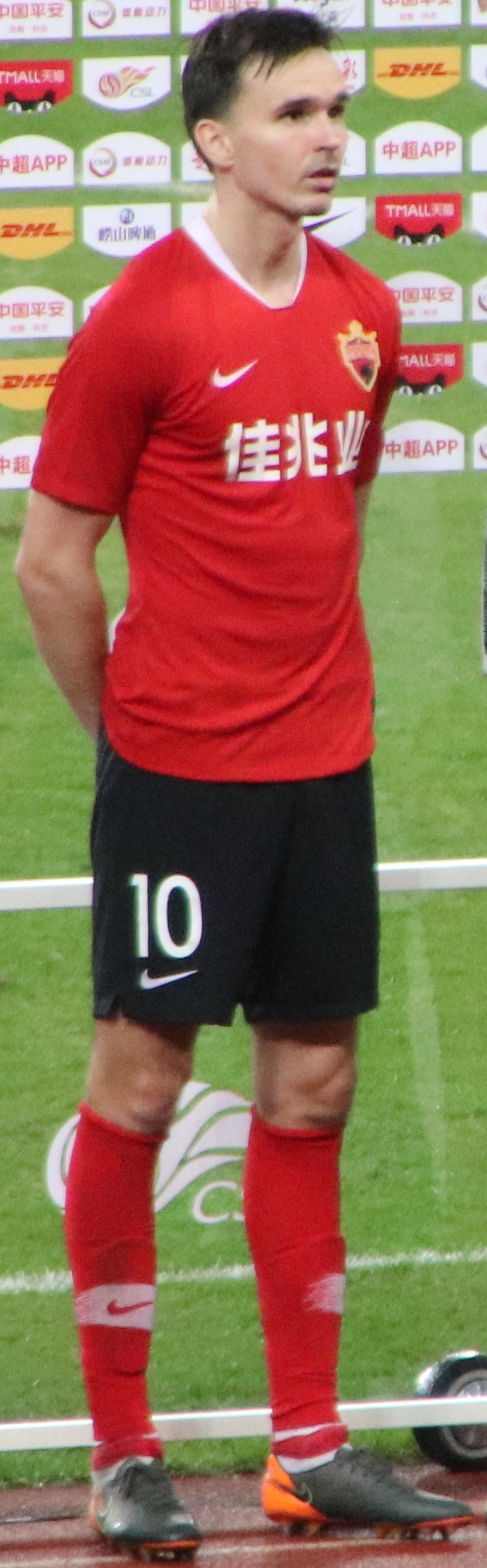

Personal information
- Full name: Ole Kristian Selnæs
- Date of birth: 7 July 1994 (age 32)
- Place of birth: Trondheim, Norway
- Height: 1.87 m (6 ft 2 in)
- Position: Defensive midfielder

Team information
- Current team: Rosenborg
- Number: 10

Youth career
- Skjetten SK
- –2009: Sverresborg
- 2009–2012: Rosenborg

Senior career*
Years	Team	Apps	(Gls)
2012–2016	Rosenborg	87	(4)
2016–2019	Saint-Étienne	75	(0)
2019–2022	Shenzhen FC	45	(4)
2021	→ Hebei FC (loan)	14	(1)
2022–2023	Zürich	16	(0)
2023–	Rosenborg	78	(3)

International career^{‡}
2010	Norway U16	10	(2)
2011	Norway U17	12	(0)
2011–2012	Norway U18	7	(0)
2012–2013	Norway U19	11	(1)
2013–2016	Norway U21	8	(0)
2015–2019	Norway	32	(2)
- * Club domestic league appearances and goals as of 22 November 2026 ‡ National team caps and goals as of 15 November 2019

Ole Kristian Selnæs (born 7 July 1994) is a Norwegian professional footballer who plays for Norwegian club Rosenborg as a defensive midfielder. Between 2015 and 2019, he made 32 appearances for the Norway national team scoring twice. He is the son of former Rosenborg goalkeeper Ivar Selnæs.

== Club career ==
=== Early career ===
Selnæs was born in Trondheim, but lived in Lillestrøm when his father Ivar Selnæs was head coach of Skjetten SK and he was playing in the youth department of the same club. His family later moved back to Trondheim, with Selnæs joining Sverresborg IF.

=== Rosenborg ===
When Selnæs joined Rosenborg in 2009, he was earmarked for his accurate left foot and good knowledge of the game, which allowed him to develop as a defensive midfielder.

In 2011, he was heavily involved in the Rosenborg under-19 side that won the national championship and gained third place in their NextGen Series group. Despite still being barely known from outside the club, he was being recognised internally with an integral part of the first team's 2012 pre-season. His impressive pre-season was rewarded when, on 25 March, he signed a professional contract.

He started the season as back-up to the midfield pair of Mohammed-Awal Issah and Markus Henriksen, but soon became first choice beside Henriksen. His professional debut came against Lillestrøm on 1 April 2012, when he came on as a late substitute for Issah. The next week, he made his first start at home to Sogndal.

After four league matches he was named the biggest talent in Scandinavia by the web-site scan-scout.com, which did not surprise Rosenborg's head coach Jan Jönsson: "He has developed very fast, but I'm not surprised."

Selnæs was a regular in Rosenborg's midfield during the first half of the 2012 season, but lost his place in the starting line-up due to an injury. After his recovery, Rosenborg had bought Tarik Elyounoussi, Cristian Gamboa and Jaime Alas and Selnæs' chances were limited. But he stated in an interview with NRK in September 2012 that "I am only 19 years old and have plenty of time, and will work hard to get more chances for the first-team".

=== Saint Etienne ===
Selnæs joined AS Saint-Étienne on 31 January 2016.

=== Shenzhen FC ===
On 9 February 2019, Selnæs transferred to Super League newcomer Shenzhen FC.

=== Zürich ===
On 24 June 2022, Selnæs signed a one-year deal with Zürich in Switzerland. His first goal scored with his new team was an own goal in the match against Glimt in UEFA Europa League the 15 september 2022.

== International career ==
Selnæs represented his country from under-16 to under-21 youth level.

As of February 2021, he made 32 appearances for the senior national team.

== Personal life ==
Selnæs is a big fan of Norwegian soap opera Hotel Cæsar, and in an interview with Adresseavisen in March 2012 he stated that he would love to play a role in the show. Two months later he was offered a small speaking role in the TV series.

== Career statistics ==
=== Club ===
As of 22 November 2026

Appearances and goals by club, season and competition
Club	Season	Division	League		National cup (Note: Includes Norwegian Cup, Coupe de France, Chinese FA Cup, Swiss Cup)		League cup (Note: Includes Coupe de la Ligue)		Continental		Total	
Club	Season	Division	Apps	Goals	Apps	Goals	Apps	Goals	Apps	Goals	Apps	Goals
Rosenborg	2012	Tippeligaen	22	1	4	0	—		8 (Note: Appearances in UEFA Europa League)	0	34	1
Rosenborg	2013	Tippeligaen	19	0	7	2	—		3	0	29	2
Rosenborg	2014	Tippeligaen	21	1	2	0	—		6	0	29	1
Rosenborg	2015	Tippeligaen	25	2	3	0	—		14	0	42	2
Rosenborg	Total		87	4	16	2	—		31	0	134	6
Saint-Étienne	2015–16	Ligue 1	3	0	2	0	0	0	—		5	0
Saint-Étienne	2016–17	Ligue 1	26	0	1	0	1	0	9	0	37	0
Saint-Étienne	2017–18	Ligue 1	26	0	2	0	1	0	—		29	0
Saint-Étienne	2018–19	Ligue 1	20	0	0	0	0	0	—		20	0
Saint-Étienne	Total		75	0	5	0	2	0	9	0	91	0
Shenzhen FC	2019	Chinese Super League	27	4	0	0	—		—		27	4
Shenzhen FC	2020	Chinese Super League	18	0	1	0	—		—		19	0
Shenzhen FC	Total		45	4	1	0	—		—		46	4
Hebei (loan)	2021	Chinese Super League	14	1	0	0	—		—		14	1
Zürich	2022–23	Swiss Super League	16	0	1	0	—		12	0	29	0
Rosenborg	2023	Eliteserien	9	0	0	0	—		0	0	9	0
Rosenborg	2024	Eliteserien	22	1	3	0	—		0	0	25	1
Rosenborg	2025	Eliteserien	24	0	5	0	—		6	0	35	0
Rosenborg	2026	Eliteserien	23	2	1	0	—		—		24	2
Rosenborg	Total		78	3	9	0	—		6	0	93	3
Career total			317	12	32	2	2	0	58	0	409	14

=== International ===
As of match played on 15 October 2019

Appearances and goals by national team and year
National team	Year	Apps	Goals
Norway	2016	9	0
Norway	2017	5	1
Norway	2018	9	1
Norway	2019	9	0
Total		32	2

Scores and results list Norway's goal tally first, score column indicates score after each Selnæs goal.

List of international goals scored by Ole Selnæs
No.	Date	Venue	Opponent	Score	Result	Competition
1	5 October 2017	San Marino Stadium, Serravalle, San Marino	San Marino	6–0	8–0	2018 FIFA World Cup qualification
2	13 October 2018	Ullevaal Stadium, Oslo, Norway	Slovenia	1–0	1–0	2018–19 UEFA Nations League C

== Honours ==
Rosenborg

- Tippeligaen: 2015
- Norwegian Cup: 2015

Individual

- Eliteserien Player of the Year: 2015
- Eliteserien Midfielder of the Year: 2015
