= Aleksander Borgersen =

Norwegian footballer (born 2009)

Personal information
- Date of birth: 24 June 2009 (age 17)
- Place of birth: Trondheim, Norway
- Position: Midfielder

Team information
- Current team: Rosenborg
- Number: 20

Youth career
- –2023: Charlottenlund
- 2023–: Rosenborg

Senior career*
Years	Team	Apps	(Gls)
2025–	Rosenborg	1	(0)

International career^{‡}
2024	Norway U15	6	(1)
2025–	Norway U16	10	(4)
- * Club domestic league appearances and goals as of 14 September 2025 ‡ National team caps and goals as of 14 September 2025

Aleksander Borgersen (born 24 June 2009) is a Norwegian footballer who plays for Norwegian club Rosenborg.

== Club career ==
In July 2025, Borgersen was included in Rosenborgs squad for the first time in the squad to face Banga in the Europa Conference League second qualifying round.

In September 2025 he made his first team debut in the 3-0 away win in the league at Haugesund, coming on as a substitute in the 89th minute. In doing so he became the second youngest Rosenborg player ever to feature in a league match at 16 years and 82 days, only beaten by Sverre Nypan.

== Personal life ==
Born in Norway, Borgersen is of mixed Norwegian and Korean descent.

== Career statistics ==
As of 16 September 2026

Appearances and goals by club, season and competition
Club	Season	Division	League		Cup		Continental		Total	
Club	Season	Division	Apps	Goals	Apps	Goals	Apps	Goals	Apps	Goals
Rosenborg	2025	Eliteserien	1	0	0	0	0	0	1	0
Rosenborg	2026	Eliteserien	0	0	2	1	0	0	2	1
Rosenborg	Total		1	0	2	1	0	0	3	1
Rosenborg	Career total		1	0	2	1	0	0	3	1
