= Morten Rutkjær =

Danish footballer and manager (born 1974)

Personal information
- Full name: Morten Rutkjær Kristensen
- Date of birth: 17 March 1974 (age 52)
- Place of birth: Rørvig, Denmark
- Height: 1.87 m (6 ft 2 in)
- Position: Defender

Team information
- Current team: Greenland

Youth career
- Nykøbing Sjælland IF
- Holbæk B&I
- Lyngby Boldklub

Senior career*
Years	Team	Apps	(Gls)
1992–1993	Holbæk B&I		
1993–1999	B.93	79	(6)
1999–2000	Boldklubben Frem	40	(1)
2001	Hørsholm-Usserød IF		

International career
1991	Denmark U19	1	(0)

Managerial career
- 2007–2011: Nordvest FC (youth)
- 2012–2013: Vanløse IF
- 2015: Holbæk B&I (reserves)
- 2015–2016: B93
- 2017: BK Frem (assistant)
- 2019: B.93 (assistant)
- 2020–: Greenland
- * Club domestic league appearances and goals

Morten Rutkjær (born 17 March 1974) is a Danish former football player and currently manager of the Greenland national football team.

Rutkjær played professional football at B93 and represented the team in the Danish Superliga.

== Career ==
Following his retirement he became a manager. In January 2012 he became new manager of Vanløse IF in the Danish 2nd Division. He resigned in the summer of 2013.

In January 2015 he became new manager of the reserve team of Holbæk B&I. He left this job half a year later, when he was appointed new manager of B93.

In December 2016 he left B93 by mutual consent. On 29 December 2016 it was announced that he would be new assistant manager to Danny Jung at Boldklubben Frem from January 2017. When Jung left the club in August 2017, Rutkjær followed him.

On 29 June 2019, Rutkjær was appointed assistant manager of B.93, which he earlier had been manager of. He left in December 2019 following the sacking of Danny Jung.

In August 2020 he was named new manager of the Greenland national football team.
