= Jonas Mortensen =

Danish footballer (born 2001)

Personal information
- Full name: Jonas Søgaard Mortensen
- Date of birth: 17 January 2001 (age 25)
- Place of birth: Alslev, Denmark
- Height: 1.79 m (5 ft 10 in)
- Position: Right-back

Team information
- Current team: Rosenborg
- Number: 15

Youth career
- Alslev SK
- Varde IF
- 2014–2019: Esbjerg fB

Senior career*
Years	Team	Apps	(Gls)
2019–2025	Esbjerg fB	105	(3)
2025–	Rosenborg	32	(1)

International career
2017	Denmark U16	3	(0)
2018	Denmark U17	3	(0)
2018	Denmark U18	4	(0)
2019–2020	Denmark U19	10	(2)
- * Club domestic league appearances and goals as of 22 November 2026

Jonas Søgaard Mortensen (born 17 January 2001) is a Danish professional footballer who plays for Rosenborg.

== Club career ==
In 2012, Mortensen joined Esbjerg fB from Varde IF at the age of 13. In December 2016, Mortensen signed a three-year youth contract with the club. Already at the age of 16, Mortensen was a starter for the U19 squad.

Mortensen made his competitive debut for Esbjerg on 27 February 2019 against OB, playing 98 minutes of the Danish Cup quarter-final, which Esbjerg lost 5–4 after penalties. He made his league debut the following month, coming off the bench for Carlo Holse deep into injury time in a 2–1 victory against Vejle in the Danish Superliga.

Ahead of the 2019–20 pre-season, Mortensen was permanently promoted into the first team squad. Mortensen left the club at the end of the season. A month after the club announced Mortensen's departure, it emerged that the parties had signed a new agreement until June 2024. In June 2024, Mortensen extended further until June 2027.

== Career statistics ==
=== Club ===
As of match played 22 November 2026

Appearances and goals by club, season and competition
Club	Season	League			Cup		Europe		Other		Total	
Club	Season	Division	Apps	Goals	Apps	Goals	Apps	Goals	Apps	Goals	Apps	Goals
Esbjerg	2018–19	Danish Superliga	1	0	1	0	—		—		2	0
Esbjerg	2019–20	Danish Superliga	3	0	0	0	—		—		3	0
Esbjerg	2020–21	Danish 1st Division	8	0	0	0	—		—		8	0
Esbjerg	2021–22	Danish 1st Division	22	0	1	0	—		—		23	0
Esbjerg	2022–23	Danish 2nd Division	28	2	1	0	—		—		29	2
Esbjerg	2023–24	Danish 2nd Division	25	1	2	0	—		—		27	1
Esbjerg	2024–25	Danish 1st Division	18	0	2	0	—		—		20	0
Esbjerg	Total		105	3	7	0	—		—		112	3
Rosenborg	2025	Eliteserien	13	0	3	0	1	0	—		17	0
Rosenborg	2026	Eliteserien	19	1	3	0	—		—		22	1
Rosenborg	Total		32	1	6	0	1	0	—		39	1
Career total			137	4	13	0	1	0	—		151	4

== International career ==
Mortensen made his debut for Denmark under-16s on 21 May 2017, coming on as a substitute in a 1–1 UEFA Development Tournament draw against Kosovo. He made his first appearance at under-17 level in January 2018, playing in a 3–2 friendly win against Cyprus U17. He would go on to make three total appearances for the U17 team. On 13 January 2019, Mortensen made his debut for the under-19 team in a 1–1 friendly draw against Israel U19, playing the second half instead of Japhet Sery Larsen. He would go on to make 10 total appearances for the under-19 team.
