= Jesper Møller (football executive) =

Danish lawyer and sports executive (born 1963)

Vice Chairman of the Danish Football Association
- In office 20 February 2004 – 1 March 2014
- Preceded by: Henning R. Jensen
- Succeeded by: Thomas Christensen; Bent Clausen

16th Chairman of the Danish Football Association
- Incumbent
- Assumed office 1 March 2014
- Preceded by: Allan Hansen

Personal details
- Born: 9 June 1963 (age 63) Skørping, Denmark
- Occupation: Lawyer chair of dbu

Jesper Møller Christensen (born 9 June 1963 in Skørping) is a Danish lawyer and sports executive who has served as chairman of the Danish Football Association (DBU) since March 2014 and is a former chairman of Aalborg Boldspilklub. Since February 2019, Møller has been a member of UEFA's Executive Committee, and since 2025 he has served as a vice-president of UEFA.

== Career ==
Møller was born in June 1963 and grew up in Skørping in Himmerland. During his childhood, he played football for IF Frem Skørping. He did so until the age of 19, when he left the town to pursue his studies.

He holds a law degree from Aarhus University, and in 1988 he was employed as a lawyer at the law firm Henrik Christensen & Partnere in Aalborg. In 1999 he became a partner in the firm. He has also taught company law in the HA/jur and cand.merc.aud. programmes at Aalborg University.

=== Football ===
Jesper Møller became vice chairman of Aalborg Boldspilklub in 1993, and later that year he was also appointed to the board of AaB A/S. In 2000, he was elected chairman of Aalborg Boldspilklub.

==== DBU ====
In 1998, he was elected to the board of the Danish Football Association as a representative of clubs in the country's top division. From the same year and for the following four years, he served as chairman of DBU Fair Play. This position was replaced in 2002 by a similar role in DBU Elite Development.

When Henning R. Jensen at the end of January 2004 decided to step down as vice chairman of DBU, Jesper Møller chose to run for the position. He faced Kurt Bagge-Hansen in the election. In a written vote at the DBU representative meeting on 20 February, Møller was elected with 94 votes against Bagge-Hansen's 46 votes. Five years later, he was re-elected as vice chairman.

The DBU chairman since 2002, Allan Hansen, announced in June 2013 that he would step down when his term expired on 1 March 2014. Møller quickly became the favourite among the 145 members of the association's representative body, and on 31 August he registered as a candidate for the chairmanship. When the deadline expired on 31 December, Møller was the only candidate, and on 1 March 2014 at the representative meeting in Odense he was elected as DBU's 16th chairman.

At the DBU representative meeting in March 2026, Jesper Møller was re-elected as chairman without opposition. He thereby began his fourth term, which runs until 2030.
