= Mathias Christensen =

Danish footballer (born 2001)

Personal information
- Full name: Mathias Minik Fals Schandorff Christensen
- Date of birth: 10 November 2001 (age 24)
- Height: 1.87 m (6 ft 2 in)
- Position: Midfielder

Team information
- Current team: Aalesund
- Number: 21

Youth career
- Helsingør
- 2018: Helsingborg
- 2019–2021: Helsingør

Senior career*
| Years | Team | Apps | (Gls) |
| 2020–2021 | Helsingør | 6 | (0) |
| 2021–2023 | Roskilde | 25 | (5) |
| 2023–2025 | Helsingør | 57 | (11) |
| 2025– | Aalesund | 43 | (15) |

International career
| 2024– | Greenland | | |
- * Club domestic league appearances and goals as of 2 November 2026

Mathias Christensen (born 10 November 2001) is a Danish footballer who plays as a midfielder for Aalesunds FK. He represents Greenland.

== Career ==
Christensen hails from Helsingør and spent most of his career in FC Helsingør except for a stint in Roskilde FC. He made his Danish 1st Division debut in September 2020.

FC Helsingør eventually found itself in dire straits, were relegated from the 2023–24 Danish 1st Division and were nearly relegated from the 2024–25 Danish 2nd Division. Christensen however left Denmark altogether as he was picked up by Norwegian second-tier club Aalesunds FK. Aalesund already had several Danish players, including one with an almost identical name, Mathias Kristensen.

During his first half season, he managed 6 goals and 12 assists across all competitions—league, cup and playoff. He received the most attention for converting a free kick from near the halfway line in August 2025. Aalesund won promotion to the 2026 Eliteserien via playoff.

== Personal life and international career ==
He is nicknamed "Mac". In May 2024, Christensen was called up to the Greenland national football team for matches in Turkey. His father was born in Greenland, reflected in Mathias Christensen's middle name Minik, but he had never been to Greenland himself. As of late 2025, he still had not been.

List of international goals scored by Mathias Christensen
| No. | Date | Venue | Opponent | Score | Result | Competition |
|---|---|---|---|---|---|---|
| 7 | 8 October 2025 | Sportzentrum Traiskirchen, Traiskirchen, Austria | Slovenia Amateurs | – | 4–5 | ANT Nations Cup 2025 |
