= Greenland at the 2022 European Championships =

in (Germany) Munich 11 August 2018 – 21 August 2018
- Competitors: 1 in 1 sport
- Medals: Gold 0 Silver 0 Bronze 0 Total 0

European Championships appearances (overview)
- 2018; 2022

Greenland competed at the 2022 European Championships in Munich, Germany, from 11–21 August 2022.

== Competitors ==
The following is the list of number of competitors in the Championships:

Sport	Men	Women	Total
Table tennis	1	0	1

== Table Tennis ==
=== Men ===
Athlete	Event	Qualification stage				Preliminary Round 1	Preliminary Round 2	Round of 64	Round of 32	Round of 16	Quarterfinals	Semifinals	Final / BM	
Athlete	Event	Opposition Score	Opposition Score	Opposition Score	Rank	Opposition Score	Opposition Score	Opposition Score	Opposition Score	Opposition Score	Opposition Score	Opposition Score	Opposition Score	Rank
Ivik Nielsen	Men's singles	Mladenovic (LUX); L 3–0	Andersen (DEN); L 3–0	Kozul (SLO); L 3–0		did not advance								
Ivik Nielsen; Daniels Kogans (LAT)	Men's doubles	—				Sgouropoulos (GRE) & Konstantinopoulos (GRE); L 3–0	did not advance							

=== Mixed ===
Athlete	Event	Preliminary Round 1	Preliminary Round 2	Round of 32	Round of 16	Quarterfinals	Semifinals	Final / BM	
Athlete	Event	Opposition Score	Opposition Score	Opposition Score	Opposition Score	Opposition Score	Opposition Score	Opposition Score	Rank
Ivik Nielsen; Sabina Musajeva (LAT)	Mixed doubles	Karabaxhak (KOS) & Zeqiri (KOS); W 3–1	Olah (FIN) & Eerland (NED); L 3–0	did not advance					
