= Morten Hamm =

Danish footballer (born 1974)

Personal information
- Full name: Morten Hamm
- Date of birth: 4 August 1974 (age 52)
- Place of birth: Copenhagen, Denmark
- Height: 1.87 m (6 ft 2 in)
- Position: Defender

Senior career*
| Years | Team | Apps | (Gls) |
| 1992–1998 | Hvidovre | | |
| 1998–2003 | Viborg | 133 | (4) |
| 2003–2008 | Frem | 125 | (8) |
| 2008–2010 | Nordvest | | |

Managerial career
- 2006–2008: Frem (player assistant)
- * Club domestic league appearances and goals

Morten Hamm (born 4 August 1974) is a Danish former professional footballer who played as a defender.

He has played for Hvidovre IF, Viborg FF, Frem and most recently Nordvest FC, where he retired in the summer of 2010 to become a teacher at the club's football college.

Between 2006 and 2008, Hamm worked as a playing assistant coach at Frem.

== Honours ==
Viborg FF

- Danish Cup
  - 1999–2000
