= Allan Hansen (DBU) =

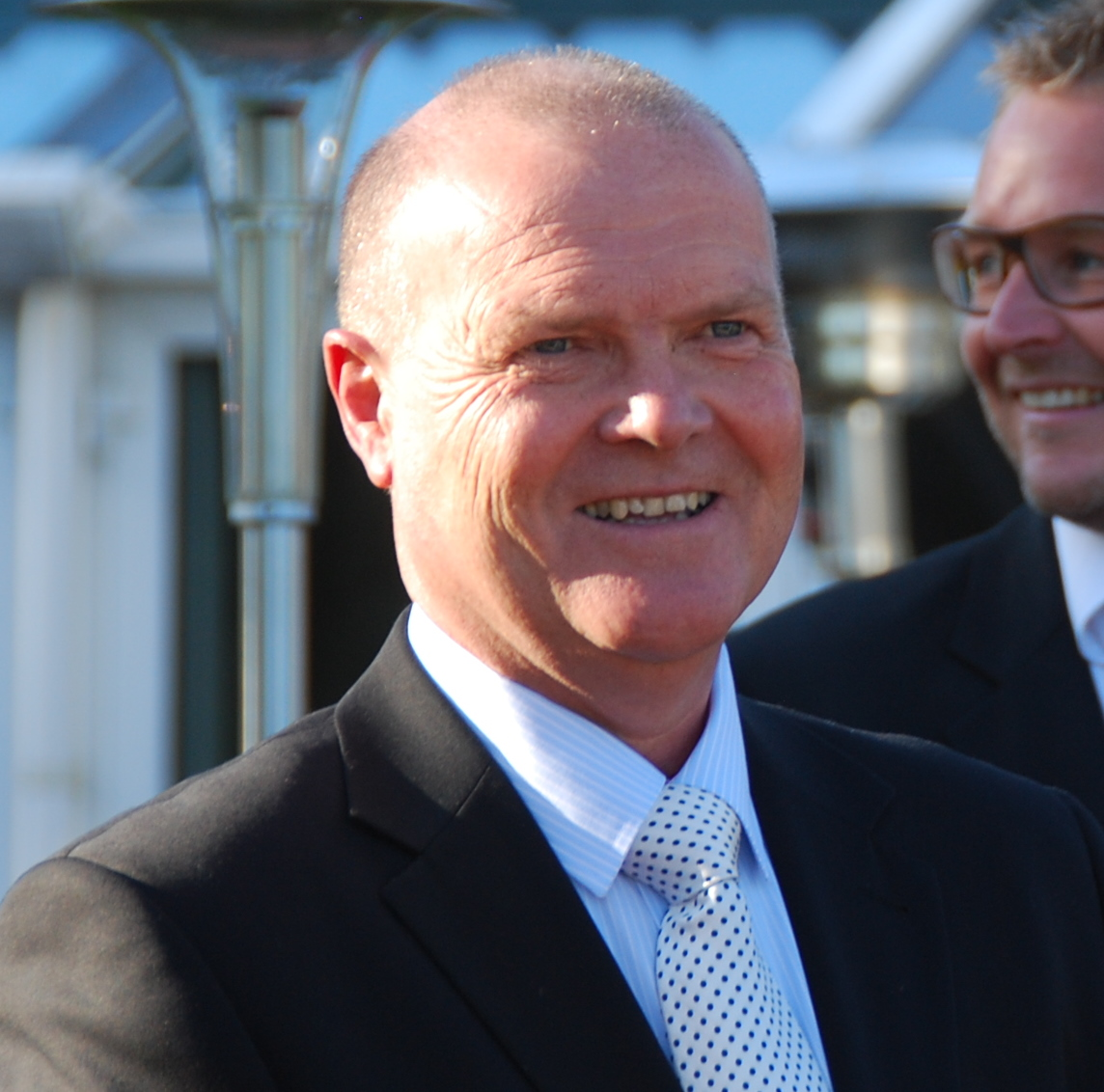
- Hansen in June 2011
- Full name: Allan Nørager Hansen
- Born: 27 February 1949 (age 76); Bogense, Denmark

Allan Nørager Hansen (born 27 February 1949 in Bogense, Denmark) is a Danish sports leader, and between 2002 and 2014 he was the chairman of the Danish Football Association (DBU).

He was a skilled mason and a policeman. Since 1971, he has been employed by the Danish police.

In 1997, he became the president of Funen Football Association (Fyns Boldspil-Union) and also member of the DBU Board. In February 2002, Allan Hansen was one of two candidates for the presidency of DBU after Poul Hyldgaard retired after 11 years as chairman. Allan Hansen won with 92 votes against his opponent, then Vice-President Henning R. Jensens 46 votes.

On 1 March 2014, he was succeeded by Jesper Møller. This came after he announced in June 2013 that he did not want re-election.
