= Elias Slørdal =

Norwegian footballer (born 2008)

Personal information
- Full name: Elias Vullum Slørdal
- Date of birth: 14 October 2008 (age 18)
- Place of birth: Trondheim, Norway
- Position: Midfielder

Team information
- Current team: Rosenborg
- Number: 28

Youth career
- –2020: Hommelvik
- 2020: Trygg/Lade
- 2021–2022: Ranheim
- 2022–2025: Rosenborg

Senior career*
Years	Team	Apps	(Gls)
2025–	Rosenborg	1	(0)

International career^{‡}
2024	Norway U16	8	(2)
2025	Norway U17	10	(1)
- * Club domestic league appearances and goals as of 30 November 2025 ‡ National team caps and goals as of 30 November 2025

Elias Vullum Slørdal (born 14 October 2008) is a Norwegian footballer who plays for Norwegian club Rosenborg.

== Club career ==
In October 2025, Slørdal signed a new contract and got promoted to the first team.

In November 2025 he made his first team debut in the 6–0 home win in the league against Strømsgodset, coming on as a substitute in the 72nd minute.

== Career statistics ==
As of 22 August 2026

Appearances and goals by club, season and competition
Club	Season	Division	League		Cup		Continental		Total	
Club	Season	Division	Apps	Goals	Apps	Goals	Apps	Goals	Apps	Goals
Rosenborg	2025	Eliteserien	1	0	0	0	0	0	1	0
Rosenborg	2026	Eliteserien	0	0	1	2	0	0	1	2
Rosenborg	Total		1	0	1	2	0	0	2	2
Rosenborg	Career total		1	0	1	2	0	0	2	2
