= Greenland national football team =

National football team representing Greenland

Greenland
- Nickname(s): Polar-Bamserne (The Polar Teddy Bears)
- Association: Football Association of Greenland (KAK)
- Confederation: CONIFA
- Head coach: Morten Rutkjær
- Captain: Patrick Frederiksen
- Most caps: Anders H. Petersen (26)
- Top scorer: Jan Nielsen (11)
- Home stadium: Nuuk Stadium
- FIFA code: GRL
| First colours | Second colours |

First international
- Faroe Islands 6–0 Greenland (Sauðárkrókur, Iceland; 2 July 1980)

Biggest win
- Greenland 16–0 Sark (Saint Martin, Guernsey; 1 July 2003)

Biggest defeat
- Faroe Islands 6–0 Greenland (Sauðárkrókur, Iceland; 2 July 1980); Greenland 0–6 Guernsey (Burra, Shetland; 13 July 2005); Menorca 6–0 Greenland (Sund, Åland; 29 June 2009); Greenland 0–6 Isle of Man (Visby, Gotland; 30 June 2017)

CONIFA European Football Cup
- Appearances: 1 (first in 2026)
- Best result: Third place (2026)

Island Games
- Appearances: 15 (first in 1989)
- Best result: Runners-up (2013, 2017)

Greenland Cup
- Appearances: 3 (first in 1980)
- Best result: Runners-up (1983)

ELF Cup
- Appearances: 1 (first in 2006)
- Best result: Group stage (2006)

The Greenland national football team (Greenlandic: Kalaallit nunaanni isikkamik arsarnermi nunanut allanut unammisartut; Danish: Grønlands fodboldlandshold) represents Greenland in non-FIFA international tournaments. It is controlled by the Football Association of Greenland. Although it has the same status as the Faroe Islands within the Kingdom of Denmark, Greenland is not, unlike the Faroe Islands national football team, a member of FIFA nor of any continental confederation and therefore is not eligible to enter the World Cup or other sanctioned tournaments. Most of the matches they have played have been against the Faroe Islands and Iceland, but neither of the two consider those games full internationals. In May 2024, it was announced that Greenland had officially applied to become a member of CONCACAF, however the application was later rejected. The team is currently members of CONIFA, an international governing body for association football teams that are not affiliated with FIFA.

== Overview ==
=== History ===
The Football Association of Greenland was founded in 1971 to oversee the development of football in the territory, although an island-wide club championship had been held regularly since 1954. Greenland played its first international match on 2 July 1980 against another Danish territory, the Faroe Islands, losing 6–0. The match was played in Sauðárkrókur in Iceland as part of the Greenland Cup, a friendly tournament. In their second match on 3 July, Greenland played the hosts and full FIFA members Iceland in Húsavík, losing 4–1, finishing third in the tournament.

Three years later, they hosted the second Greenland Cup, however the 1983 format consisted of a single match between Greenland and the Faroe Islands to determine the winner. Played on 29 June in Nuuk, the match finished 0–0. Therefore, a few days later, on 3 July the match was replayed, this time ending in a 3–2 victory for the Faroese.

The third and final Greenland Cup was played in the Faroe Islands in 1984, and saw Iceland's return to the competition. In their opening match on 3 August, Greenland were narrowly defeated 1–0 by Iceland in Fuglafjørður. Two days later, they were once again defeated 1–0 by the Faroe Islands in Klaksvík, and finished third in the tournament as in 1980. Shortly after the tournament, they played a friendly match against the Faroese on 7 August in Tórshavn, they lost 4–2.

Greenland is a member of the International Island Games Association and has taken part in Football at the Island Games. Since 13 October 2005, it is a provisional member of the N.F.-Board and since 25 March 2006 it is full-member. On 17 October 2009, the team was accepted as a provisional member of the IFU. Greenland also played Tibet, another non-FIFA team, in 2001 at Copenhagen's Vanløse Arena. However, the team was composed of players who were of Tibetan heritage and not from Tibet themselves. The match drew international attention when China threatened to embargo Greenland's shrimp exports because of Tibet's contested sovereignty. Greenland won the match 4–1.

== Future international participation ==
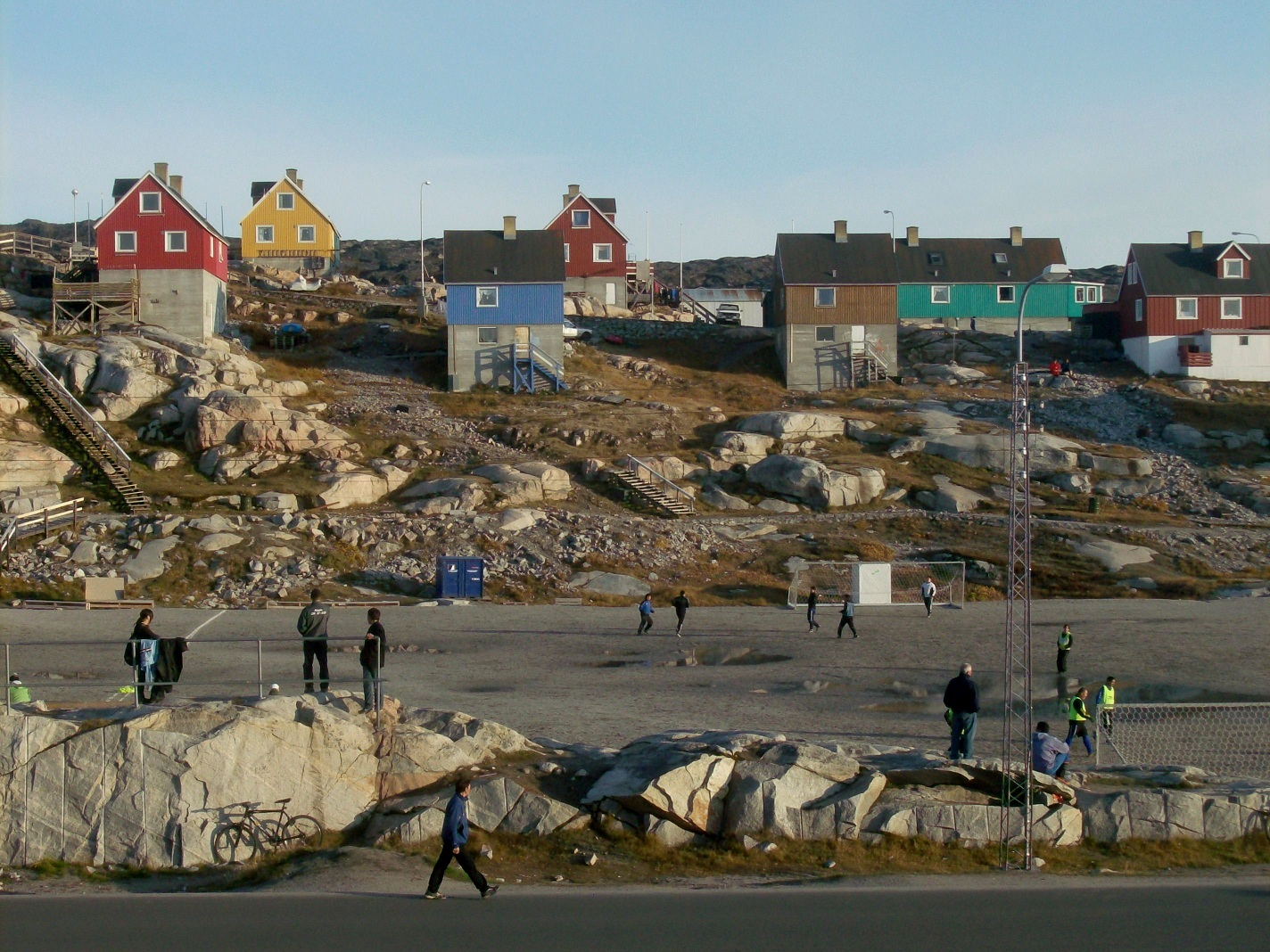
Typical playing surfaces in Greenland, such as this one in Ilulissat, do not meet FIFA regulations.

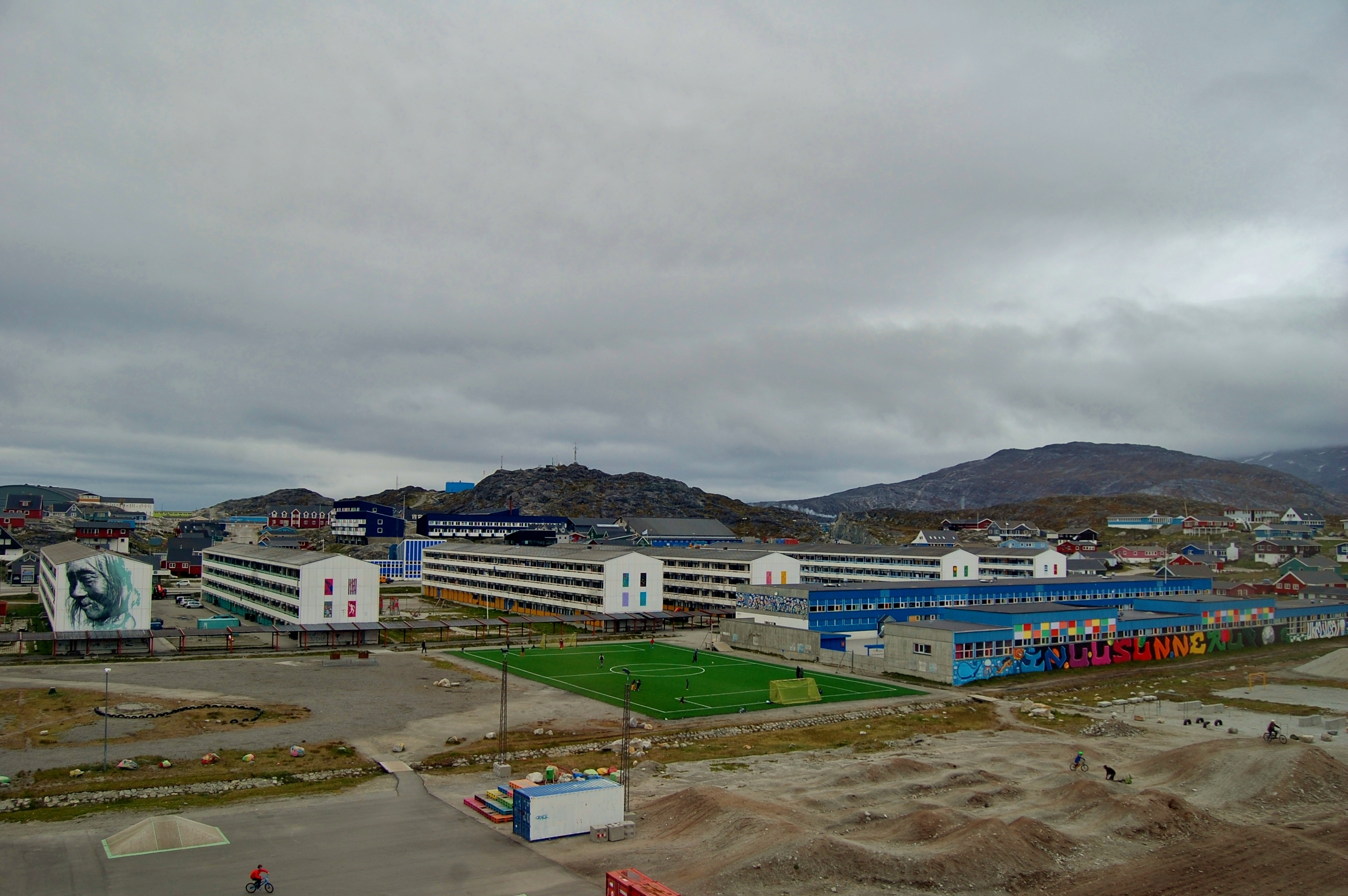
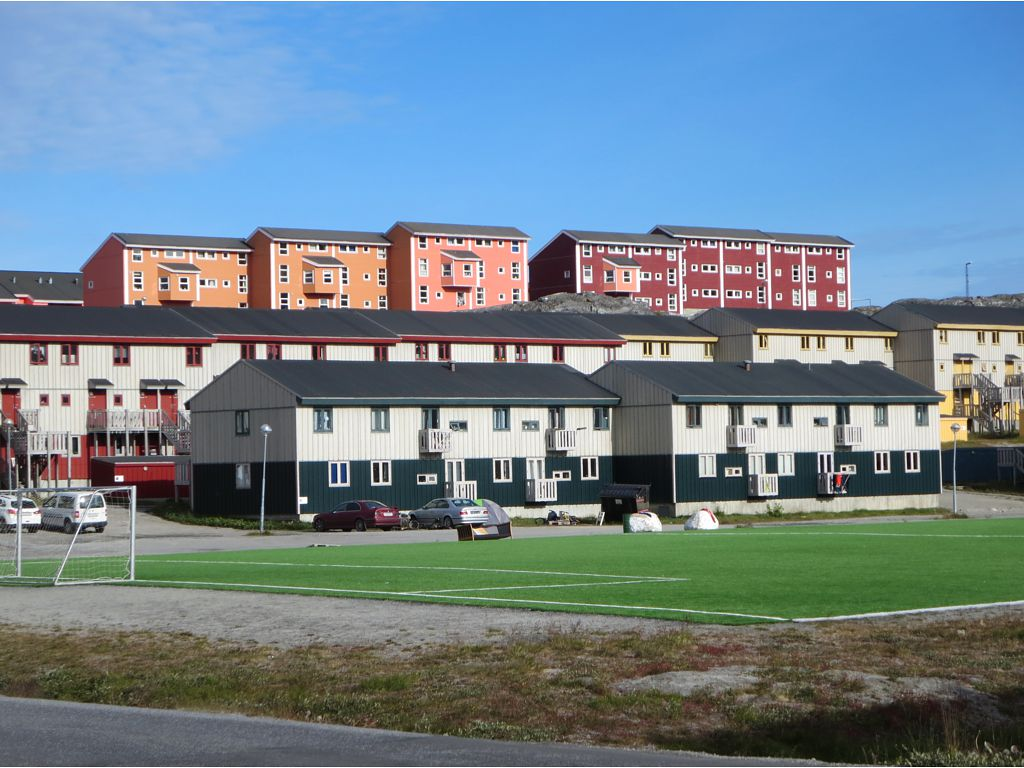
However, pitches like these with artificial turf are becoming more common.

Greenland has been seeking to participate in confederated football since at least 1998 when then national team manager Sepp Piontek stated that he had already asked UEFA to look into the possibility of Greenland becoming a member of the organization. About the issue, former DBU president Allan Hansen stated, "Concerning the GBU, I’m not convinced [they] officially applied for FIFA and UEFA membership at around the same time as Gibraltar. As I’m informed, the GBU in the late nineties sent a letter [requesting clarification on a number of issues] but there were no follow-up actions." Additionally, he stated, "I can't foretell what will happen in the future, but I have attended a meeting with UEFA, DBU and GBU and I'm convinced that the day DBU and GBU present a partnership agreement and a road-map for the development of Greenlandic football, UEFA will be ready to discuss options for supporting the development of Greenlandic football as well as football on an administrative level." However, another report from 2010 states that an application was submitted but other factors such as the admittance of former Soviet and Yugoslav nations made for bad timing of the application.

FIFA's approval of FieldTurf may allow Greenland to create FIFA-standard playing pitches and apply to play full internationals, as natural grass is effectively impossible to grow in Greenland. The first artificial turf in Greenland was completed and inaugurated in Qaqortoq in September 2009. On 13 September 2010, FIFA president Sepp Blatter arrived in Qaqortoq and announced FIFA's approval of the new field, which is seen as a major step towards the country being granted FIFA membership.

In 2011, Allan Hansen, chairman of the Danish Football Association stated that he did not believe that Greenland had the opportunity to become a member of FIFA or a confederation immediately. However, in December 2014 the DBU and Greenland's GBU formed a partnership with the aim of having Greenland included as a UEFA and FIFA member by 2020. One of the greatest barriers to admittance at that time was FIFA's strict regulations on stadiums and playing surfaces. The DBU's support of a Greenlandic application to FIFA included financial support which would be used to replace the clay courts of at least one field in each of the country's four municipalities, with artificial turf. Additionally, it was announced in May 2015 the national government had allocated one million dollars to design a plan for the construction of a new covered national stadium in Nuuk. The intentions of the plan were to design a covered and heated facility that would have a capacity of several thousand spectators, with the plan to be presented to the Parliament of Greenland later in the autumn session of 2016. Although unrelated to the stadium proposal, the first artificial pitch was laid in Nuuk, the country's capital, in June 2015 and at the national stadium in July 2016.

According to FIFA statutes, "an association which has not yet gained independence may, with the authorisation of the association in the country on which it is dependent, also apply for admission to FIFA." This would allow for Greenland's admission, since it has Denmark's support.

But before becoming a member of FIFA, Greenland would be required to be a member of a continental confederation. The most viable solutions would be to join UEFA or CONCACAF due to political links and geographical proximity, respectively. However, unlike FIFA, UEFA requires new members to be recognized by the United Nations as fully independent (as of 2016), despite having previously accepted dependent territories like the Faroe Islands and Gibraltar, and the non-independent UK home nations even being founding members of UEFA.

It was believed that UEFA would vote to change its membership requirements at the 41st Annual Congress held in Helsinki, Finland so that they were more in line with those of FIFA which allows non-independent states under certain conditions. At that time DBU chair Allan Hansen said, "Greenland is in a pre-membership stage right now. I'm a lot more optimistic than I was five years ago." At that time, GBU chair John Thorsen expected that if UEFA changes its membership requirement, Greenland could have an application together by 2020. However, after the UEFA Congress, no mention of a rule change was made.

In May 2022 it was announced that Greenland had officially begun the process of becoming a member of CONCACAF and was expected to attend the body's next congress with observer status. It was anticipated that the association would submit its formal application by 2024 or 2025. The same challenges of the past, including lack of sufficient infrastructure, were expected to prolong the application process. Shortly thereafter it was revealed that the association and head coach Morten Rutkjær had begun to identify players in Denmark who have Greenlandic roots. The association also appealed to UEFA for permission to play friendlies against San Marino and Gibraltar but were denied as it was outside of the FIFA match day window. Instead Greenland participated in a tournament in Turkey in September 2022.

Kenneth Kleist was elected new president of the KAK in October 2023. At that time, he announced the association's intentions to apply for full CONCACAF membership in 2024. The plan was to hopefully submit the application on 21 June, Greenland National Day. At that time, he also stated that the association had been informed that it was "quite close to admission" in the confederation. On 13 May 2024, the Football Association of Greenland formally submitted its application to become the 42nd members of CONCACAF. The team scheduled a match against Turkmenistan the following month as part of a training camp in Turkey. Greenland went on to lose the match 0–5.

The federation was scheduled to travel to the CONCACAF headquarters in Miami in late February 2025 to discuss Greenland's potential membership. However, the meeting was delayed after United States President Donald Trump expressed his desire for the United States to gain control of the country. It was then expected that the meeting would be held in London the following month. At that time, Greenland also announced that they were planning a friendly against the Tuvalu national team later in the year to raise awareness for climate change. Tuvalu was expected to be one of the first islands lost to rising sea levels while Greenland was the origin of the ice that was melting and causing the rise. CONCACAF rejected Greenland's application in June 2025, without giving any details on the reasons.

== Team image ==
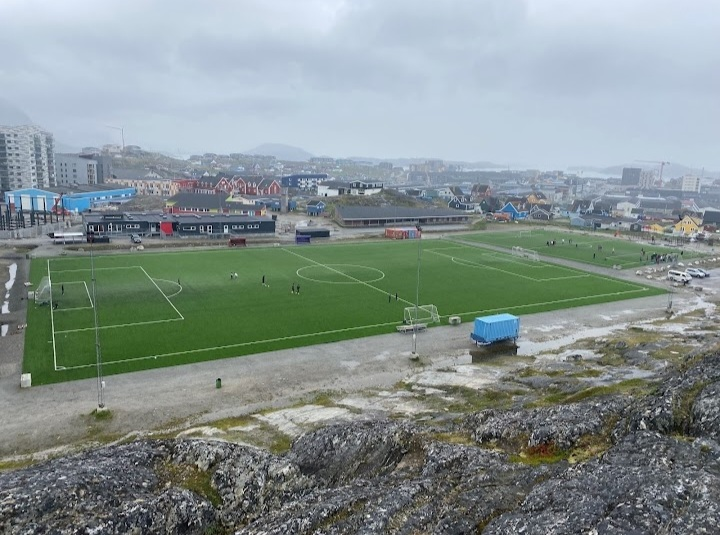
Nuuk Stadium, where the Greenland national team plays its home games

=== Stadium ===
The team currently plays its home matches at Nuuk Stadium in Greenland's capital of Nuuk. The Arktisk Stadion is a proposed new national stadium which would meet the requirements of international football confederations.

=== Kit ===
| Kit supplier | Period | Notes |
|---|---|---|
| Macron | 2020-2024 | |
| Hummel | 2024-present | |

From July 2020 to September 2024 Greenland's kit was provided by Italian sportswear company Macron. From September 2024 Greenland signed a contract with Hummel until 2028.

== Results and fixtures ==
=== 2026 ===
| 31 May Friendly | Friuli | 5–0 | Greenland | Manzano, Italy |
| 18:15 | | | | Stadium: Campo Polisportivo Comunale Cav. Giuseppe Morigi |

| 3 June 2026 CONIFA European Football Cup | Padania | 3–1 | Greenland | Carate Brianza, Italy |
| 14:30 | Ravasi 36'; Colombo 54'; Rossetti 86' | | Ejler 55' |

| 4 June 2026 CONIFA European Football Cup | Raetia | 1–4 | Greenland | Carate Brianza, Italy |
| | Agaei 85' | | Eriksen Petersen 1'; Johansen 33'; Gundel-Collin 53'; B. Rosing 59' |

| 6 June 2026 CONIFA European Football Cup | Greenland | 3–2 | Canton Ticino | Carate Brianza, Italy |
| 14:00 | Gundel-Collin 9'; Jensen 51'; Ejler 80' | | Bejeranu 22'; Heimidach 61' | Stadium: Carate Stadium |

== Coaching staff ==
=== Current coaching staff ===
Coaching staff
| Position | Name |
|---|---|
| Head Coach | (Denmark) Morten Rutkjær |
| Assistant coach(es) | (Denmark) Morten Hamm |
| Assistant coach(es) | (Greenland) Nukannguaq Zeeb |
| Fitness coach | (Denmark) Steen Cortsen |
| Goalkeeping coach | (Denmark) Mikkel Kvist Willumsen |

=== Manager history ===
| No. | Name | Period |
|---|---|---|
| 1 | (Greenland) Niels Møller | 1977–1980 |
| 2 | (Greenland) Uvdlo Jakobsen (Greenland) Elisaeus Kreutzmann | 1983 |
| 3 | (Greenland) Lars Lundblad | 1984–1986 |
| 4 | (Greenland) Simon Simonsen | 1989–1991 |
| 5 | (Greenland) Isak Nielsen Kleist | 1993–1995 |
| 6 | (Greenland) Ulf Abrahamsen | 1996 |
| 7 | (Greenland) Lars Olsvig (Greenland) Jens Jorgen Egede | 1997–1999 |
| 8 | (Germany) Sepp Piontek | 2000–2002 |
| 9 | (Denmark) Jens Tang Olesen (Greenland) Kristian Lyberth | 2003–2004 |
| 10 | (Germany) Sepp Piontek | 2004 |
| 11 | (Denmark) Jens Tang Olesen (Greenland) Hans Frederik Olsen | 2004–2010 |
| 12 | (Greenland) René Olsen → (Greenland) Tønnes Berthelsen (co-manager) → (Eritrea) (Greenland) Tekle Ghebrelul (co-manager) | 2010–2019 2010–2012 2013–2019 |
| 13 | (Denmark) Morten Rutkjær | 2020–present |

== Players ==
=== Current squad ===
- The following players were called up for the 2026 CONIFA European Football Cup.

| No. | Pos. | Player | Date of birth (age) | Club |
|---|---|---|---|---|
| | GK | Brian Rosing Kleist | 28 November 1994 (age 31) | (Football Association of Greenland) SAK |
| | GK | Akkajuk Mathæussen | 28 November 1994 (age 31) | (Football Association of Greenland) FC Nuuk |
| | GK | Peter Berthelsen | 29 January 2000 (age 26) | (Football Association of Greenland) G-44 Qeqertarsuaq |
| | DF | Angutivik Gundel-Collin | 3 May 2007 (age 19) | (Football Association of Greenland) B-67 Nuuk |
| | DF | Thomas Høegh | 19 March 1985 (age 41) | (Danish Football Association) Skjold Birkerød |
| | DF | Patrick Frederiksen | 28 April 1994 (age 32) | (Football Association of Greenland) B-67 Nuuk |
| | DF | Adam Ejler Hansen | 13 January 2004 (age 22) | (Danish Football Association) Holbæk B&I |
| | DF | Jørgen Kreutzmann | | (Football Association of Greenland) IT-79 |
| | DF | Miilu Jensen | | (Danish Football Association) Vanløse IF |
| | MF | Søren Kreutzmann | 5 December 1994 (age 31) | (Football Association of Greenland) B-67 Nuuk |
| | MF | John-Ludvig Broberg | 19 November 1990 (age 35) | (Football Association of Greenland) B-67 Nuuk |
| | MF | Qulutannguaq Tittussen | | (Football Association of Greenland) IT-79 |
| | MF | Malik Jensen | 2008 | (Danish Football Association) SfB-Oure FA U19 |
| | MF | Jonathan Rosing | | (Danish Football Association) Futsal Aarhus |
| | MF | Tue Zethsen Lund | | (Danish Football Association) |
| | MF | Ari Jean Hermann | 6 September 1997 (age 29) | (Football Association of Greenland) B-67 Nuuk |
| | FW | Rene Eriksen Petersen | 11 June 2001 (age 25) | (Football Association of Greenland) B-67 Nuuk |
| | FW | Nemo Thomsen | 5 April 2004 (age 22) | (Danish Football Association) Brabrand |
| | FW | Niklas Johansen | 20 May 2002 (age 24) | (Football Association of Greenland) N-48 |
| | FW | Gustav Hammond Krogh | | (Danish Football Association) Frederiksberg Reserves |
| 18 | FW | Niels Erik Eriksen | 29 May 1986 (age 40) | (Football Association of Greenland) G-44 Qeqertarsuaq |
| | FW | Bastian Rosing | | (Football Association of Greenland) B-67 Nuuk |

== Player records ==
As of 1 June 2024
Players in bold are still active with Greenland.

=== Most capped players ===
| Rank | Name | Caps | Goals | Career |
|---|---|---|---|---|
| 1 | Anders H. Petersen | 26 | 7 | 2001–2017 |
| 2 | Aputsiaq Birch | 19 | 0 | 2005–2017 |
| 3 | John Rasmus Eldevig | 18 | 1 | 2003–2013 |
| 4 | Maasi Maqe | 16 | 1 | 2009–2015 |
| 4 | **John-Ludvig Broberg** | 16 | 6 | 2011–present |
| 6 | Jan Nielsen | 15 | 11 | 1991–1999 |
| 6 | Kaali Lund Mathæussen | 15 | 4 | 2009–2017 |
| 8 | Norsaq Lund Mathæussen | 14 | 9 | 2011–2017 |
| 8 | Peri Fleischer | 14 | 4 | 2003–2009 |
| 8 | Niklas Kreutzmann | 14 | 4 | 2003–2006 |
| 8 | Kaassannguaq Zeeb | 14 | 1 | 2005–2015 |
| 8 | Nukannguaq Zeeb | 14 | 1 | 2011–2023 |

=== Top goalscorers ===
| Rank | Name | Goals | Caps | Ratio | Career |
|---|---|---|---|---|---|
| 1 | Jan Nielsen | 11 | 15 | 0.73 | 1991–1999 |
| 2 | Norsaq Lund Mathæussen | 9 | 14 | 0.64 | 2011–2017 |
| 3 | Vitus Kofoed | 7 | 4 | 1.75 | 2003 |
| 3 | Anders H. Petersen | 7 | 26 | 0.26 | 2001–2017 |
| 5 | **Nemo Thomsen** | 6 | 5 | 1.2 | 2020–present |
| 5 | Pavia Mølgaard | 6 | 6 | 1 | 2009–2011 |
| 5 | **John-Ludvig Broberg** | 6 | 16 | 0.38 | 2011–present |
| 8 | Leifeeraq Karlsen | 5 | 9 | 0.56 | 2003–2005 |
| 9 | Peri Fleischer | 4 | 14 | 0.29 | 2003–2009 |
| 9 | Niklas Kreutzmann | 4 | 14 | 0.29 | 2003–2006 |
| 9 | Kaali Lund Mathæussen | 4 | 15 | 0.27 | 2009–2017 |

== Competitive record ==
=== Island Games ===
Island Games record
| Year | Round | Position | GP | W | D | L | GS | GA |
|---|---|---|---|---|---|---|---|---|
| (Faroe Islands) 1989 | Fourth place | 4th | 4 | 1 | 0 | 3 | 4 | 8 |
| (Åland) 1991 | Group stage | 8th | 4 | 0 | 0 | 4 | 8 | 15 |
| (Isle of Wight) 1993 | Fourth place | 4th | 4 | 2 | 0 | 2 | 9 | 6 |
| (Gibraltar) 1995 | Fourth place | 4th | 5 | 2 | 0 | 3 | 10 | 10 |
| (Jersey) 1997 | Group stage | 9th | 4 | 0 | 1 | 3 | 3 | 9 |
| (Gotland) 1999 | Group stage | 8th | 5 | 2 | 0 | 3 | 11 | 18 |
| (Isle of Man) 2001 | Group stage | 9th | 4 | 2 | 1 | 1 | 6 | 2 |
| (Guernsey) 2003 | Group stage | 10th | 5 | 3 | 0 | 2 | 22 | 5 |
| (Shetland) 2005 | Group stage | 8th | 5 | 1 | 2 | 2 | 8 | 14 |
| (Rhodes) 2007 | Did not enter | | | | | | | |
| (Åland) 2009 | Group stage | 9th | 4 | 1 | 0 | 3 | 8 | 15 |
| (Isle of Wight) 2011 | Group stage | 11th | 4 | 1 | 0 | 3 | 5 | 7 |
| (Bermuda) 2013 | Runners-up | 2nd | 4 | 2 | 0 | 2 | 21 | 4 |
| (Jersey) 2015 | Group stage | 5th | 4 | 3 | 1 | 0 | 8 | 4 |
| (Gotland) 2017 | Runners-up | 2nd | 5 | 2 | 2 | 1 | 7 | 9 |
| (Gibraltar) 2019 (Note: Not held football tournament (Replaced by 2019 Inter Games Football Tournament in Anglesey).) | Did not enter | | | | | | | |
| (Guernsey) 2023 | Group stage | 8th | 4 | 1 | 1 | 2 | 7 | 10 |
| (Orkney) 2025 | Did not enter | | | | | | | |
| Total | Runners-up | 15/17 | 65 | 23 | 8 | 34 | 137 | 136 |

Key

Champion Runners-up 3rd Place

**Red border color indicates the tournament was held at home.

=== Greenland Cup record ===
Greenland Cup record
| Year | Round | Position | Pld | W | D | L | GF | GA |
|---|---|---|---|---|---|---|---|---|
| (Iceland) 1980 | Third place | 3rd | 2 | 0 | 0 | 2 | 1 | 10 |
| (Greenland) 1983 | Runners-up | 2nd | 2 | 0 | 1 | 1 | 2 | 3 |
| (Faroe Islands) 1984 | Third place | 3rd | 2 | 0 | 0 | 2 | 0 | 2 |
| Total | Runners-up | 3/3 | 6 | 0 | 1 | 5 | 3 | 15 |

=== World tournaments record ===
| FIFI Wild Cup / ELF Cup record | | | | | | | | | Qualification record | | | | | |
| Year | Result | Position | Pld | W | D | L | GF | GA | Pld | W | D | L | GF | GA |
|---|---|---|---|---|---|---|---|---|---|---|---|---|---|---|
| 2006 | Group stage | 5th | 2 | 0 | 0 | 2 | 2 | 5 | Qualified as invitees | | | | | |
| (Northern Cyprus) 2006 | Group stage | 5th | 3 | 1 | 1 | 1 | 3 | 2 | Qualified as invitees | | | | | |
| VIVA World Cup / ConIFA World Football Cup record | | | | | | | | | Qualification record | | | | | |
| Year | Result | Position | Pld | W | D | L | GF | GA | Pld | W | D | L | GF | GA |
| (Occitania) 2006 | Did not enter | | | | | | | | Did not enter | | | | | |
| (Sápmi) 2008 | Did not enter | | | | | | | | Did not enter | | | | | |
| (Padania) 2009 | Did not enter | | | | | | | | Did not enter | | | | | |
| (Gozo) 2010 | Did not enter | | | | | | | | Did not enter | | | | | |
| (Kurdistan Region) 2012 | Did not enter | | | | | | | | Did not enter | | | | | |
| (Sápmi) 2014 | Not member of ConIFA | | | | | | | | Not member of ConIFA | | | | | |
| (Abkhazia) 2016 | Did not enter | | | | | | | | Did not enter | | | | | |
| (Barawa) 2018 | Did not qualify | | | | | | | | 5 | 2 | 2 | 1 | 7 | 9 |
| (Kurdistan Region) 2024 | Did not enter | | | | | | | | Did not enter | | | | | |
| Total | — | 0/8 | – | – | – | – | – | – | 5 | 2 | 2 | 1 | 7 | 9 |

Greenland participated in the 2006 FIFI Wild Cup. The team played two games and lost both, the first 0–1 against the Turkish Republic of Northern Cyprus and the second 2–4 against Zanzibar. They were eliminated in the First Round.

Greenland was eliminated in Round 1 of the ELF Cup. They played three matches in total, beating the national team of Gagauzia 2–0, drawing 1–1 with Zanzibar and losing 1–0 to Kyrgyzstan.

=== ConIFA Euro Cup record ===
ConIFA European Football Cup
| Year | Result | Position | Pld | W | D | L | GF | GA |
|---|---|---|---|---|---|---|---|---|
| (Hungary) 2015 | Not member of ConIFA | | | | | | | |
| (Northern Cyprus) 2017 | Did not enter | | | | | | | |
| (Republic of Artsakh) 2019 | Did not enter | | | | | | | |
| (Padania) 2026 | Third place | 3rd | 3 | 2 | 0 | 1 | 8 | 6 |
| Total | Third place | 1/4 | 3 | 2 | 0 | 1 | 8 | 6 |

== Head-to-head record ==
As of 6 June 2026

| Opponent | P | W | D | L | GF | GA | GD | Win % |
|---|---|---|---|---|---|---|---|---|
FIFA members
| Bermuda | 2 | 0 | 0 | 2 | 0 | 4 | −4 | 0.00 |
| Faroe Islands | 7 | 0 | 1 | 6 | 6 | 20 | −14 | 0.00 |
| Gibraltar | 4 | 2 | 0 | 2 | 7 | 7 | +0 | 50.00 |
| Iceland | 2 | 0 | 0 | 2 | 1 | 5 | −4 | 0.00 |
| Turkmenistan | 1 | 0 | 0 | 1 | 0 | 5 | −5 | 0.00 |
| Total FIFA | 16 | 2 | 1 | 13 | 14 | 41 | −27 | 12.50 |
Non FIFA members
| Åland | 6 | 1 | 0 | 5 | 10 | 17 | −7 | 16.67 |
| Alderney | 1 | 1 | 0 | 0 | 3 | 0 | +3 | 100.00 |
| Bermuda U23 | 1 | 0 | 0 | 1 | 2 | 3 | −1 | 0.00 |
| Canton Ticino | 1 | 1 | 0 | 0 | 3 | 2 | +1 | 100.00 |
| Falkland Islands | 2 | 2 | 0 | 0 | 13 | 0 | +13 | 100.00 |
| Friuli | 1 | 0 | 0 | 1 | 0 | 5 | −5 | 0.00 |
| Frøya | 5 | 3 | 1 | 1 | 20 | 5 | +15 | 60.00 |
| Găgăuzia | 1 | 1 | 0 | 0 | 2 | 0 | +2 | 100.00 |
| Gotland | 4 | 2 | 0 | 2 | 8 | 12 | −4 | 50.00 |
| Guernsey | 2 | 0 | 1 | 1 | 0 | 6 | −6 | 0.00 |
| Isle of Man | 2 | 1 | 0 | 1 | 4 | 6 | −2 | 50.00 |
| Isle of Wight | 6 | 2 | 1 | 3 | 8 | 14 | −6 | 33.33 |
| Jersey | 5 | 0 | 0 | 5 | 10 | 18 | −8 | 0.00 |
| Kosovo U21 | 1 | 0 | 0 | 1 | 0 | 1 | −1 | 0.00 |
| Kyrgyzstan (futsal) | 1 | 0 | 0 | 1 | 0 | 1 | −1 | 0.00 |
| Menorca | 4 | 0 | 2 | 2 | 5 | 12 | −7 | 0.00 |
| Northern Cyprus | 1 | 0 | 0 | 1 | 0 | 1 | −1 | 0.00 |
| Orkney | 2 | 1 | 1 | 0 | 4 | 3 | +1 | 50.00 |
| Padania | 1 | 0 | 0 | 1 | 1 | 3 | −2 | 0.00 |
| Raetia | 1 | 1 | 0 | 0 | 4 | 1 | +3 | 100.00 |
| Rhodes | 3 | 0 | 0 | 3 | 1 | 6 | −5 | 0.00 |
| Saaremaa | 3 | 3 | 0 | 0 | 8 | 2 | +6 | 100.00 |
| Sápmi | 1 | 0 | 0 | 1 | 1 | 5 | −4 | 0.00 |
| Sark | 1 | 1 | 0 | 0 | 16 | 0 | +16 | 100.00 |
| Shetland | 4 | 2 | 0 | 2 | 10 | 12 | −2 | 50.00 |
| Tibet | 1 | 1 | 0 | 0 | 4 | 1 | +3 | 100.00 |
| Western Isles | 3 | 2 | 1 | 0 | 8 | 4 | +4 | 66.67 |
| Ynys Môn | 4 | 1 | 1 | 2 | 2 | 3 | −1 | 25.00 |
| Zanzibar | 1 | 0 | 0 | 1 | 2 | 4 | −2 | 0.00 |
| Zanzibar U20 | 1 | 0 | 1 | 0 | 1 | 1 | +0 | 0.00 |
| Total non FIFA | 70 | 26 | 9 | 35 | 150 | 148 | +2 | 37.14 |
| Total | 86 | 28 | 10 | 48 | 164 | 189 | −25 | 32.56 |

== Honours ==
=== Non-FIFA competitions ===
- Island Games
  - Silver medal (2): 2013, 2017

=== Friendly ===
- Greenland Cup
  - Runners-up (1): 1983
  - Third place (2): 1980, 1984

== See also ==
- Association Football in Greenland
- Greenland Cup
- Greenlandic Football Championship
- Sport in Greenland
