= Hadsund BK =

Danish football club

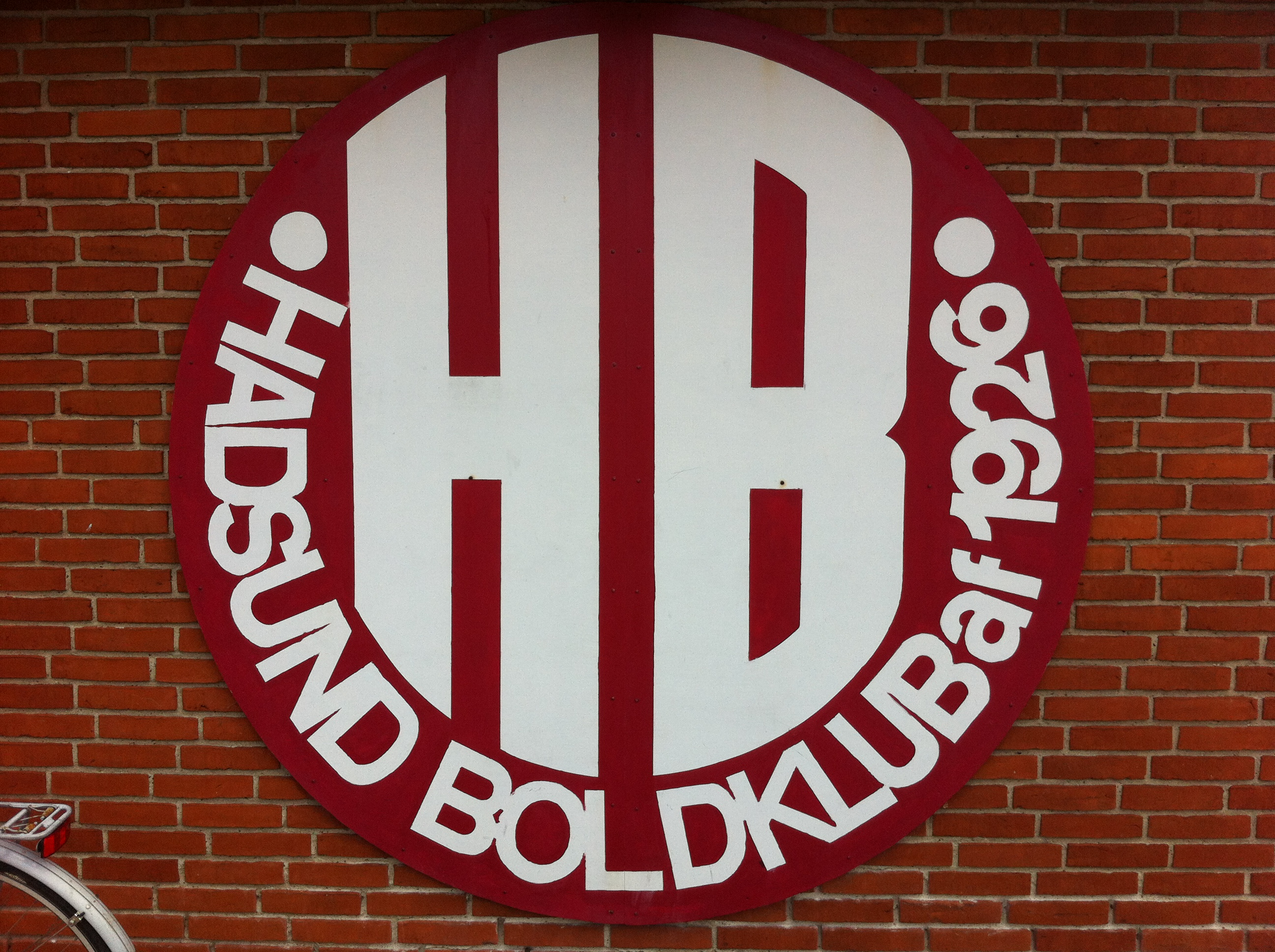
- Full name: Hadsund Boldklub
- Founded: 1926
- Ground: Hadsund Hallerne, Hadsund
- Capacity: 2,000
- League: Denmark Series

Hadsund BK is a football club based in Hadsund, Jutland, Denmark, currently playing in the Denmark Series. Their most prominent product is Ebbe Sand, born in Aalborg but raised in Hadsund.
