= 2021 Rosenborg BK season =

Rosenborg
2021 season
- Chairman: Ivar Koteng
- Coach: Åge Hareide
- Stadium: Lerkendal Stadion
- Eliteserien: 5th
- Norwegian Cup: Third round
- Europa Conference League: Play-off round vs Rennes
- Top goalscorer: League: Stefano Vecchia (11); All: Dino Islamović (15)
- Highest home attendance: 17 439 vs Sandefjord (24 October)
- Lowest home attendance: 600 (Due to COVID-19 restrictions)
- Average home league attendance: 6 577 (Due to COVID-19 restrictions) (12 December)
Home colours	Away colours	Third colours

The 2021 season was Rosenborg's 42nd consecutive year in the top flight now known as Eliteserien, their 53rd season in the top flight of Norwegian football. They participated in the Eliteserien, Cup and Europa Conference League entering at the Second Qualifying round. This was Åge Hareide's first full season as Rosenborg manager. The start of the season was postponed from 5 April to 8 May due to the COVID-19 pandemic.

== Squad ==
Note: Flags indicate national team as defined under FIFA eligibility rules; some limited exceptions apply. Players may hold more than one non-FIFA nationality.

No.	Pos.	Nation	Player
1	GK	(Norway) NOR	André Hansen
2	DF	(Norway) NOR	Erlend Dahl Reitan
3	DF	(Sweden) SWE	Jonathan Augustinsson
4	MF	(Norway) NOR	Vebjørn Hoff
5	MF	(Norway) NOR	Per Ciljan Skjelbred
6	MF	(Norway) NOR	Alexander Tettey
7	MF	(Norway) NOR	Markus Henriksen (captain)
8	MF	(Norway) NOR	Anders Konradsen
9	FW	(Montenegro) MNE	Dino Islamović
11	FW	(Denmark) DEN	Carlo Holse
13	GK	(Norway) NOR	Julian Faye Lund
14	FW	(Sweden) SWE	Rasmus Wiedesheim-Paul

No.	Pos.	Nation	Player
15	DF	(Iceland) ISL	Hólmar Örn Eyjólfsson
16	DF	(Norway) NOR	Even Hovland
18	FW	(Norway) NOR	Noah Holm
19	DF	(Norway) NOR	Adrian Pereira
20	MF	(Norway) NOR	Edvard Tagseth
21	MF	(Norway) NOR	Olaus Skarsem
22	FW	(Sweden) SWE	Stefano Vecchia
23	MF	(Sweden) SWE	Pavle Vagić
24	GK	(Norway) NOR	Sander Tangvik
25	DF	(Sweden) SWE	Adam Andersson
26	DF	(Bosnia and Herzegovina) BIH	Besim Šerbečić
35	FW	(Norway) NOR	Emil Ceïde

== Transfers ==
=== Winter ===
In: Note: Flags indicate national team as defined under FIFA eligibility rules; some limited exceptions apply. Players may hold more than one non-FIFA nationality.

No.	Pos.	Nation	Player
3	DF	(Sweden) SWE	Jonathan Augustinsson (from (Sweden) Djurgården)
4	MF	(Norway) NOR	Vebjørn Hoff (from (Norway) Odd)
6	MF	(Norway) NOR	Alexander Tettey (from (England) Norwich City)
10	FW	(Sweden) SWE	Guillermo Molins (free agent)
22	FW	(Sweden) SWE	Stefano Vecchia (free transfer from (Sweden) Sirius)
25	DF	(Sweden) SWE	Adam Andersson (free transfer from (Sweden) Häcken)
27	FW	(Norway) NOR	Ole Hammerfjell Sæter (from (Norway) Ranheim)

Out: Note: Flags indicate national team as defined under FIFA eligibility rules; some limited exceptions apply. Players may hold more than one non-FIFA nationality.

No.	Pos.	Nation	Player
2	DF	(Norway) NOR	Vegar Eggen Hedenstad (Released, to (Turkey) Fatih Karagümrük)
4	DF	(Norway) NOR	Tore Reginiussen (Released, to (Germany) FC St. Pauli)
10	FW	(Norway) NOR	Pål André Helland (to (Norway) Lillestrøm)
13	GK	(Norway) NOR	Julian Faye Lund (on loan to (Norway) HamKam)
19	DF	(Norway) NOR	Gustav Valsvik (Released)
22	MF	(Norway) NOR	Gjermund Åsen (on loan to (Norway) Lillestrøm)
23	FW	(Norway) NOR	Filip Brattbakk (on loan to (Norway) Ranheim)
25	DF	(Guinea) GUI	Pa Konate (Released, to (Bulgaria) Botev Plovdiv)
28	FW	(Nigeria) NGA	Samuel Adegbenro (to (Sweden) Norrköping)
34	MF	(Norway) NOR	Erik Botheim (Released, to (Norway) Bodø/Glimt)
37	MF	(Norway) NOR	Mikael Tørset Johnsen (on loan to (Netherlands) Feyenoord)
39	DF	(Norway) NOR	Sondre Skogen (free transfer to (Netherlands) Feyenoord)
40	GK	(Norway) NOR	Rasmus Semundseth Sandberg (to (Norway) Stjørdals-Blink)
—	DF	(Norway) NOR	Warren Kamanzi (on loan to (Norway) Ranheim)
—	MF	(Serbia) SRB	Đorđe Denić (to (Cyprus) Apollon Limassol)
—	DF	(Norway) NOR	Torbjørn Lysaker Heggem (to (Norway) Sandnes Ulf)
—	FW	(Norway) NOR	Andreas Helmersen (Released, to (Norway) Raufoss)

=== Summer ===
In: Note: Flags indicate national team as defined under FIFA eligibility rules; some limited exceptions apply. Players may hold more than one non-FIFA nationality.

No.	Pos.	Nation	Player
13	GK	(Norway) NOR	Julian Faye Lund (loan return from (Norway) HamKam)
18	FW	(Norway) NOR	Noah Holm (from (Portugal) Vitória Guimarães)
19	DF	(Norway) NOR	Adrian Pereira (from (Greece) PAOK)
21	MF	(Norway) NOR	Olaus Skarsem (from (Norway) Kristiansund)
23	MF	(Sweden) SWE	Pavle Vagić (from (Sweden) Malmö FF)

Out: Note: Flags indicate national team as defined under FIFA eligibility rules; some limited exceptions apply. Players may hold more than one non-FIFA nationality.

No.	Pos.	Nation	Player
10	FW	(Sweden) SWE	Guillermo Molins (to (Norway) Sarpsborg 08)
18	MF	(Norway) NOR	Kristoffer Zachariassen (to (Hungary) Ferencváros)
27	FW	(Norway) NOR	Ole Hammerfjell Sæter (on loan to (Norway) Ull/Kisa)
37	DF	(Norway) NOR	Paweł Chrupałła (on loan to (Norway) Stjørdals-Blink)
38	DF	(Norway) NOR	Mikkel Ceïde (on loan to (Norway) Ranheim)
—	MF	(Norway) NOR	Mikael Tørset Johnsen (on loan to (Netherlands) Feyenoord)

== Friendlies ==
17 April 2021	Rosenborg (Norway)	3–0	(Norway) Raufoss	Trondheim
13:00 UTC (UTC+1)	Islamović 30'; Ceïde 54'; Holse 82'	Summary		Stadium: Lerkendal Park

21 April 2021	Rosenborg (Norway)	2–1	(Norway) Ranheim	Trondheim
16:00 UTC (UTC+1)	Islamović 56'; Šerbečić 57'	Summary	López 65'	Stadium: Lerkendal Park

25 April 2021	Rosenborg (Norway)	1–0	(Norway) Tromsø	Trondheim
13:00 UTC (UTC+1)	Islamović 71' (pen.)	Summary		Stadium: Lerkendal Park

28 April 2021	Rosenborg (Norway)	3–0	(Norway) Kristiansund	Trondheim
16:00 UTC (UTC+1)	Vecchia 10'; Zachariassen 61'; Holse 63'			Stadium: Lerkendal Stadion

2 May 2021	Ranheim (Norway)	2–1	(Norway) Rosenborg	Trondheim
16:00 UTC (UTC+1)	Hovland 18' (o.g.); Mehnert 68'	Summary	Ceïde 3'	Stadium: EXTRA Arena

== Competitions ==
=== Eliteserien ===
==== Results summary ====
Overall								Home						Away					
Pld	W	D	L	GF	GA	GD	Pts	W	D	L	GF	GA	GD	W	D	L	GF	GA	GD
30	13	9	8	58	43	+15	48	8	4	3	35	19	+16	5	5	5	23	24	−1

Last updated: 12 December 2021.
Source: see below

==== Results by round ====
Round	1	2	3	4	5	6	7	8	9	10	11	12	13	14	15	16	17	18	19	20	21	22	23	24	25	26	27	28	29	30
Ground	B	H	B	H	H	B	H	B	H	B	H	B	H	B	B	H	B	H	B	H	B	H	H	B	H	B	B	H	B	H
Result	D	W	D	W	L	W	W	L	L	L	D	D	W	W	W	W	L	W	W	W	L	D	W	D	L	D	L	D	W	D
Position	6	3	5	9	6	3	6	8	9	11	11	9	7	5	4	3	5	4	4	3	4	4	3	4	4	4	4	5	4	5

Updated to match(es) played on 12 December 2021. Source: see below
A = Away; H = Home; W = Win; D = Draw; L = Loss

==== Results ====
9 May 2021 1	Vålerenga	1–1	Rosenborg	Oslo
20:00 CEST (UTC+2)	Hovland 39' (o.g.)	Summary	Hovland (yellow card) 9'; Zachariassen 44' (yellow card) 63'; Andersson (yellow card) 58'; Hoff (yellow card) 88'	Stadium: Intility Arena; Attendance: 0 (Due to COVID-19 restrictions); Referee: Tore Hansen

13 May 2021 2	Rosenborg	5–0	Viking	Trondheim
18:00 CEST (UTC+2)	Henriksen 25'; Islamović (yellow card) 29'; Vecchia 45+5'; Eyjólfsson 58'; Zachariassen 71'; Molins 74'	Summary	Bell (yellow card) 7'	Stadium: Lerkendal Stadion; Attendance: 600 (Due to COVID-19 restrictions); Referee: Kristoffer Hagenes

16 May 2021 3	Bodø/Glimt	2–2	Rosenborg	Bodø
18:00 CEST (UTC+2)	Botheim 9'; Berg (yellow card) 37'; Fet 52'	Summary	Hoff (yellow card) 17'; Holse 23'; Zachariassen (yellow card) 26'; Eyjólfsson (yellow card) 81'; Wiedesheim-Paul 88'; Skjelbred (yellow card) 90+4'	Stadium: Aspmyra Stadion; Attendance: 600 (Due to COVID-19 restrictions); Referee: Kai Erik Steen

20 May 2021 4	Rosenborg	3–2	Brann	Trondheim
18:00 CEST (UTC+2)	Zachariassen 11', 84', 90+1' (yellow card) 42'	Summary	Kristiansen 50' (yellow card) 90'; Taylor 54'; Simba (yellow card) 63'; Forren (yellow card) 75'	Stadium: Lerkendal Stadion; Attendance: 600 (Due to COVID-19 restrictions); Referee: Tom Harald Hagen

24 May 2021 5	Rosenborg	2–3	Molde	Trondheim
20:00 CEST (UTC+2)	Zachariassen 43'; Holse 78'; Molins (yellow card) 90+4'	Summary	Hussain 9' (yellow card) 52'; Brynhildsen (yellow card) 73'; Hesta 87'; Bjørnbak 90'	Stadium: Lerkendal Stadion; Attendance: 600 (Due to COVID-19 restrictions); Referee: Espen Eskås

27 May 2021 6	Sandefjord	1–2	Rosenborg	Sandefjord
18:00 CEST (UTC+2)	Normann Hansen 50'; Vales (yellow card) 82'	Summary	Hovland 35'; Islamović (yellow card) 87'; Molins 90+3'	Stadium: Sandefjord Arena; Attendance: 600 (Due to COVID-19 restrictions); Referee: Ola Hobber Nilsen

30 May 2021 7	Rosenborg	4–2	Stabæk	Trondheim
18:00 CEST (UTC+2)	Wiedesheim-Paul 47'; Ceïde 61'; Skjelbred (yellow card) 72'; Zachariassen 74'; Šerbečić 77'	Summary	Wangberg 14' (yellow card) 44'; Ottesen (yellow card) 68'; Skytte (yellow card) 76'; Solheim (yellow card) 83'; Edvardsen 90+1'	Stadium: Lerkendal Stadion; Attendance: 600 (Due to COVID-19 restrictions); Referee: Kai Erik Steen

13 June 2021 8	Strømsgodset	2–1	Rosenborg	Drammen
18:00 CEST (UTC+2)	Gunnarsson (yellow card) 35'; Stengel 62' (pen.); Myhra (yellow card) 86'; Stenevik 87'	Summary	Wiedesheim-Paul 2'; Andersson (yellow card) 59'; Zachariassen (yellow card) 61'; Šerbečić (yellow card) 78'	Stadium: Marienlyst Stadion; Attendance: 600 (Due to COVID-19 restrictions); Referee: Kristoffer Hagenes

20 June 2021 9	Rosenborg	0–1	Sarpsborg 08	Trondheim
18:00 CEST (UTC+2)		Summary	Thomassen 62'	Stadium: Lerkendal Stadion; Attendance: 600 (Due to COVID-19 restrictions); Referee: Tore Hansen

24 June 2021 10	Lillestrøm	2–0	Rosenborg	Lillestrøm
20:00 CEST (UTC+2)	Helland 12'; Åsen 90+5'	Summary	Tagseth (yellow card) 45+2'; Reitan (yellow card) 55'; Hoff (yellow card) 71'	Stadium: Åråsen Stadion; Attendance: 2,000 (Due to COVID-19 restrictions); Referee: Ola Hobber Nilsen

30 June 2021 11	Rosenborg	0–0	Haugesund	Trondheim
18:00 CEST (UTC+2)	Tettey (yellow card) 65'; Augustinsson (yellow card) 90+2'	Summary	Hansen (yellow card) 55'; Baardsen Pedersen (yellow card) 59'	Stadium: Lerkendal Stadion; Attendance: 4,461 (Due to COVID-19 restrictions); Referee: Sivert Øksnes Amland

4 July 2021 12	Odd	2–2	Rosenborg	Skien
18:00 CEST (UTC+2)	Rólantsson 37'; Bakenga (yellow card) 57'; Lauritsen 90'	Summary	Islamović 17'; Zachariassen 45+2'	Stadium: Skagerak Arena; Attendance: 2,000 (Due to COVID-19 restrictions); Referee: Tore Hansen

10 July 2021 13	Rosenborg	1–0	Kristiansund	Trondheim
18:00 CEST (UTC+2)	Islamović 15'; Dahl Reitan (yellow card) 90+7'	Summary	Faris (yellow card) 25'	Stadium: Lerkendal Stadion; Attendance: 5,463 (Due to COVID-19 restrictions); Referee: Svein Oddvar Moen

18 July 2021 14	Tromsø	1–3	Rosenborg	Tromsø
18:00 CEST (UTC+2)	Totland 29'	Summary	Islamović 35'; Holse 69'; Tagseth 80'	Stadium: Alfheim Stadion; Attendance: 2,000 (Due to COVID-19 restrictions); Referee: Espen Eskås

15 August 2021 15	Mjøndalen	1–2	Rosenborg	Mjøndalen
18:00 CEST (UTC+2)	Eriksen (yellow card) 43'; Aasmundsen (yellow card) 48'; Stokke 66'; Johansen (yellow card) 75'	Summary	Dahl Reitan 31'; Konradsen 57'; Eyjólfsson (yellow card) 75'	Stadium: Consto Arena; Attendance: 1,500 (Due to COVID-19 restrictions); Referee: Ola Hobber Nilsen

22 August 2021 16	Rosenborg	5–0	Odd	Trondheim
20:00 CEST (UTC+2)	Eyjólfsson 2'; Holm 10'; Vecchia 15', 84'; Ceïde 59'; Augustinsson (yellow card) 81'; Tagseth (yellow card) 82'	Summary		Stadium: Lerkendal Stadion; Attendance: 6,235 (Due to COVID-19 restrictions); Referee: Espen Eskås

29 August 2021 17	Viking	2–1	Rosenborg	Stavanger
18:00 CEST (UTC+2)	Bell 54'; Dahl Reitan 64' (o.g.); Friðjónsson (yellow card) 80'; Tripić (yellow card) 82'	Summary	Eyjólfsson (yellow card) 40'; Skarsem 45+3'; Vagić (yellow card) 58'	Stadium: Viking Stadion; Attendance: 6,151 (Due to COVID-19 restrictions); Referee: Mohammad Usman Aslam

12 September 2021 18	Rosenborg	3–2	Tromsø	Trondheim
20:00 CEST (UTC+2)	Holm 21'; Ceïde 25'; Tettey (yellow card) 40'; Eyjólfsson (yellow card) 84'; Vecchia 90+4'	Summary	Totland 36'; Ondrášek 51'; Yttergård Jenssen (yellow card) 74'; Gundersen (yellow card) 81'	Stadium: Lerkendal Stadion; Attendance: 6,688 (Due to COVID-19 restrictions); Referee: Tore Hansen

19 September 2021 19	Sarpsborg 08	1–3	Rosenborg	Sarpsborg
18:00 CEST (UTC+2)	Dyrestam (yellow card) 10'; Utvik (yellow card) 31'; Halvorsen 76'; Wichne (yellow card) 78'	Summary	Holm (yellow card) 5'; Vecchia 22', 56'; Skjelbred 33' (yellow card) 38'; Dahl Reitan (yellow card) 68'; Andersson (yellow card) 90+3'	Stadium: Sarpsborg Stadion; Attendance: 3,409 (Due to COVID-19 restrictions); Referee: Sigurd Smehus Kringstad

26 September 2021 20	Rosenborg	3–1	Mjøndalen	Trondheim
18:00 CEST (UTC+2)	Vecchia 26', 74'; Holm 90+5'	Summary	Janevski (yellow card) 49'; Eriksen 54'; Sveen (yellow card) 60'; Sporrong (yellow card) 69'	Stadium: Lerkendal Stadion; Attendance: 10,021; Referee: Svein Oddvar Moen

3 October 2021 21	Kristiansund	1–0	Rosenborg	Kristiansund
20:00 CEST (UTC+2)	Bye (penalty missed) 1'; Strand Nilsen 9'	Summary	Andersson (red card) 1'; Holm (yellow card) 89'	Stadium: Kristiansund Stadion; Attendance: 4,444; Referee: Kai Erik Steen

17 October 2021 22	Rosenborg	2–2	Vålerenga	Trondheim
19:00 CEST (UTC+2)	Vecchia 24'; Henriksen (yellow card) 26' (yellow-red card) 42'; Ceïde 58' (yellow card) 66'	Summary	Jatta 20'; Holm 68'	Stadium: Lerkendal Stadion; Attendance: 16,618; Referee: Rohit Saggi

24 October 2021 23	Rosenborg	4–1	Sandefjord	Trondheim
17:00 CEST (UTC+2)	Holse 6', 20'; Vecchia 17'; Islamović 64'	Summary	Jónsson (yellow card) 29'; Zé Eduardo (yellow card) 37'; Moen Foss (yellow card) 53'; Ruud Tveter 68'; Vales (yellow card) 78'; Kurtovic (yellow card) 80'	Stadium: Lerkendal Stadion; Attendance: 17,439; Referee: Sivert Øksnes Amland

27 October 2021 24	Haugesund	0–0	Rosenborg	Haugesund
18:00 CEST (UTC+2)	Sandberg (yellow card) 41'	Summary		Stadium: Haugesund Stadion; Attendance: 4,228; Referee: Marius Hansen Grøtta

30 October 2021 25	Rosenborg	1–3	Lillestrøm	Trondheim
18:00 CET (UTC+1)	Hovland 22'	Summary	Mathew 68'; Lehne Olsen 79'; Pettersson 86'	Stadium: Lerkendal Stadion; Attendance: 11,126; Referee: Tore Hansen

6 November 2021 26	Brann	2–2	Rosenborg	Bergen
18:00 CET (UTC+1)	Heltne Nilsen (yellow card) 14'; Finne 23'; Taylor 25'	Summary	Dahl Reitan (yellow card) 14'; Ceïde 17' (yellow card) 59'; Holse 54'	Stadium: Brann Stadion; Attendance: 11,113; Referee: Espen Eskås

21 November 2021 27	Molde	4–1	Rosenborg	Molde
19:00 CET (UTC+1)	Ohi 29'; Wolff Eikrem 39'; Sinyan 61'; Breivik 89'	Summary	Henriksen (yellow card) 4'; Skjelbred (yellow card) 49'; Islamović 56' (yellow card) 69'	Stadium: Aker Stadion; Attendance: 7,325; Referee: Kristoffer Hagenes

28 November 2021 28	Rosenborg	0–0	Bodø/Glimt	Trondheim
17:00 CET (UTC+1)	Tagseth (yellow card) 39'	Summary	Berg (yellow card) 72'	Stadium: Lerkendal Stadion; Attendance: 10,910; Referee: Rohit Saggi

5 December 2021 29	Stabæk	1–3	Rosenborg	Bærum
17:00 CET (UTC+1)	Azemi 73'; Tomás (yellow card) 79'	Summary	Skarsem (yellow card) 54'; Holse 57'; Islamović 60'; Konradsen 76'	Stadium: Nadderud Stadion; Attendance: 2,670; Referee: Tom Harald Hagen

12 December 2021 30	Rosenborg	2–2	Strømsgodset	Trondheim
17:00 CET (UTC+1)	Vecchia 70' (pen.); Wiedesheim-Paul 85'	Summary	Vilsvik 13'; Hovland 21' (o.g.); Krasniqi (yellow card) 65'; Hove (yellow card) 65'; Myhra (yellow card) 69'; Stenevik (yellow card) 72'	Stadium: Lerkendal Stadion; Attendance: 6,697; Referee: Kai Erik Steen

==== Table ====
Pos	Team	Pld	W	D	L	GF	GA	GD	Pts	Qualification or relegation
3	Viking	30	17	6	7	60	47	+13	57	Qualification for the Europa Conference League second qualifying round (Note: Since the winners of the 2021 Norwegian Cup, Molde, have already qualified for European competitions based on league position, the last European spot was passed down to the fourth placed team, Lillestrøm.)
4	Lillestrøm	30	14	7	9	49	40	+9	49	Qualification for the Europa Conference League second qualifying round
5	Rosenborg	30	13	9	8	58	42	+16	48	
6	Kristiansund	30	14	4	12	41	46	−5	46	
7	Vålerenga	30	11	12	7	46	37	+9	45	

Source: Football Association of Norway (in Norwegian)
Rules for classification: 1) Points; 2) Goal difference; 3) Goals scored; 4) Head-to-head points; 5) Head-to-head goal difference; 6) Head-to-head away goals scored (only if between two teams); 7) Head-to-head goals scored; 8) Play-off (only used to decide champions or relegation).

=== Norwegian Cup ===
25 July 2021 First round	Melhus	0–7	Rosenborg	Melhus
18:00 CEST (UTC+2)	Gamwanya (yellow card) 28'; Nilsen (yellow card) 82'	Summary	Islamović 24' (yellow card) 28'; Ceïde (yellow card) 27'; Hovland 57' (yellow card) 39'; Tagseth (yellow card) 68'; Wiedesheim-Paul 73', 75'; Broholm 90'; Loeng Grilstad 90+2' (o.g.); Šerbečić 90+4'	Stadium: Gruva; Attendance: 730; Referee: Oliver Skaret Barsøe

1 August 2021 Second round	Orkla	1–11	Rosenborg	Orkanger
18:00 CEST (UTC+2)	Helgetun 38'	Summary	Skarsem 11', 43'; Islamović 16', 29', 34', 51'; Dahl Reitan 21'; Ceïde 23', 60', 88'; Konradsen 63'	Stadium: Orkla Sparebank Stadion; Attendance: 600; Referee: Marius Hansen Grøtta

22 September 2021 Third round	Viking	3–1	Rosenborg	Stavanger
20:10 CEST (UTC+2)	Vikstøl (yellow card) 15'; Løkberg 33'; Sebulonsen (yellow card) 44' de Lanlay 49'; Tripić 79'; Bell (yellow card) 90+2'; Kabran (yellow card) 90+3'	Summary	Dahl Reitan (yellow card) 24'; Holse 61'	Stadium: Viking Stadion; Attendance: 4,511 (Due to COVID-19 restrictions); Referee: Rohit Saggi

=== UEFA Europa Conference League ===
==== Second qualifying round ====
22 July 2021 First leg	FH (Iceland)	0–2	(Norway) Rosenborg	Hafnarfjörður, Iceland
21:00 CEST (UTC+2)	Jónsson (yellow card) 83'	Summary	Tagseth (yellow card) 59'; Holse 61'; Islamović 71'	Stadium: Kaplakriki; Attendance: 605; Referee: Filip Glova, Slovakia

29 July 2021 Second leg	Rosenborg (Norway)	4–1 (6–1 agg.)	(Iceland) FH	Trondheim
19:00 CEST (UTC+2)	Islamović 49' (pen.); Vecchia 54' (yellow card) 56'; Hoff (yellow card) 57'; Ceïde 76', 87'; Tagseth (yellow card) 82'	Summary	Gunnarsson (yellow card) 40'; Jónsson (yellow card) 48'; Þórisson 74' (yellow card) 56'	Stadium: Lerkendal Stadion; Attendance: 6,493 (Due to COVID-19 restrictions); Referee: Ferenc Karakó (Hungary)

==== Third qualifying round ====
5 August 2021 First leg	Rosenborg (Norway)	6–1	(Slovenia) Domžale	Trondheim
19:00 CEST (UTC+2)	Andersson 7' (yellow card) 78'; Islamović 22', 46'; Karić 33' (o.g.); Dahl Reitan 40'; Holm 86'	Summary	Vuklišević (yellow card) 39'; Alić 44'; Karić (yellow card) 52'	Stadium: Lerkendal Stadion; Attendance: 2,575 (Due to COVID-19 restrictions); Referee: Serhiy Boyko (Ukraine)

10 August 2021 Second leg	Domžale (Slovenia)	1–2 (2–8 agg.)	(Norway) Rosenborg	Ljubljana, Slovenia
19:00 CEST (UTC+2)	Podlogar 34'; Husmani (yellow card) 88'; Vuk (yellow card) 90'; Dobrovoljc (yellow card) 90+3'	Summary	Holm 48'; Dahl Reitan (yellow card) 59'; Vecchia 86'	Stadium: Stožice Stadium; Attendance: 758; Referee: Fabio Maresca (Italy)

==== Play-off round ====
19 August 2021 First leg	Rennes (France)	2–0	(Norway) Rosenborg	Rennes, France
20:00 CEST (UTC+2)	Aguerd 15'; Badé (yellow card) 72'; Guirassy 84'	Summary	Dahl Reitan (yellow card) 25'; Islamović (yellow card) 79'	Stadium: Roazhon Park; Attendance: 14,872; Referee: Sergey Ivanov (Russia)

26 August 2021 Second leg	Rosenborg (Norway)	1–3 (1–5 agg.)	(France) Rennes	Trondheim
19:00 CEST (UTC+2)	Vecchia 68' (pen.)	Summary	Del Castillo 5'; Meling (yellow card) 24'; Aguerd 41'; Gomis (yellow card) 67'; Abline 81'	Stadium: Lerkendal Stadion; Attendance: 7,000 (Due to COVID-19 restrictions); Referee: Paweł Raczkowski (Poland)

== Squad statistics ==
=== Appearances and goals ===
As of match played 12 December 2021

No.	Pos	Nat	Player	Total		Eliteserien		Norwegian Cup		Europa Conference League	
No.	Pos	Nat	Player	Apps	Goals	Apps	Goals	Apps	Goals	Apps	Goals
1	GK	(Norway) NOR	André Hansen	35	0	26+0	0	3+0	0	6+0	0
2	DF	(Norway) NOR	Erlend Dahl Reitan	37	3	28+0	1	3+0	1	6+0	1
3	DF	(Sweden) SWE	Jonathan Augustinsson	14	0	7+3	0	1+0	0	1+2	0
4	MF	(Norway) NOR	Vebjørn Hoff	23	0	16+0	0	2+0	0	5+0	0
5	MF	(Norway) NOR	Per Ciljan Skjelbred	18	1	11+6	1	1+0	0	0+0	0
6	MF	(Norway) NOR	Alexander Tettey	12	0	5+1	0	0+0	0	5+1	0
7	MF	(Norway) NOR	Markus Henriksen	9	1	9+0	1	0+0	0	0+0	0
8	MF	(Norway) NOR	Anders Konradsen	23	3	8+8	2	2+0	1	2+3	0
9	FW	(Montenegro) MNE	Dino Islamović	28	15	17+4	6	2+0	5	5+0	4
11	FW	(Denmark) DEN	Carlo Holse	37	9	25+4	7	2+0	1	6+0	1
13	GK	(Norway) NOR	Julian Faye Lund	5	0	4+1	0	0+0	0	0+0	0
14	FW	(Sweden) SWE	Rasmus Wiedesheim-Paul	21	6	3+15	4	0+2	2	1+0	0
15	DF	(Iceland) ISL	Hólmar Örn Eyjólfsson	22	2	16+0	2	0+0	0	6+0	0
16	DF	(Norway) NOR	Even Hovland	37	3	28+1	2	2+0	1	6+0	0
18	FW	(Norway) NOR	Noah Holm	21	5	13+2	3	1+1	0	1+3	2
19	DF	(Norway) NOR	Adrian Pereira	2	0	1+1	0	0+0	0	0+0	0
20	MF	(Norway) NOR	Edvard Tagseth	29	1	14+7	1	3+0	0	5+0	0
21	MF	(Norway) NOR	Olaus Skarsem	21	3	8+8	1	2+0	2	0+3	0
22	FW	(Sweden) SWE	Stefano Vecchia	23	14	13+4	11	0+1	0	3+2	3
23	MF	(Sweden) SWE	Pavle Vagić	10	0	9+0	0	0+1	0	0+0	0
24	GK	(Norway) NOR	Sander Tangvik	1	0	0+0	0	0+1	0	0+0	0
25	DF	(Sweden) SWE	Adam Andersson	37	1	26+2	0	3+0	0	5+1	1
26	DF	(Bosnia and Herzegovina) BIH	Besim Šerbečić	10	2	7+1	1	2+0	1	0+0	0
35	FW	(Norway) NOR	Emil Ceïde	33	10	19+5	5	3+0	3	3+3	2
36	MF	(Norway) NOR	Ingmar Orkelbog Austberg	0	0	0+0	0	0+0	0	0+0	0
39	MF	(Norway) NOR	Marius Sivertsen Broholm	1	1	0+0	0	0+1	1	0+0	0
42	FW	(Norway) NOR	Magnus Hammerås	1	0	0+0	0	0+1	0	0+0	0
43	DF	(Norway) NOR	Håkon Røsten	0	0	0+0	0	0+0	0	0+0	0
Players away from Rosenborg on loan:
22	MF	(Norway) NOR	Gjermund Åsen	0	0	0+0	0	0+0	0	0+0	0
23	FW	(Norway) NOR	Filip Brattbakk	0	0	0+0	0	0+0	0	0+0	0
27	FW	(Norway) NOR	Ole Hammerfjell Sæter	1	0	0+1	0	0+0	0	0+0	0
37	FW	(Norway) NOR	Paweł Chrupałła	0	0	0+0	0	0+0	0	0+0	0
38	DF	(Norway) NOR	Mikkel Ceïde	4	0	0+1	0	0+2	0	0+1	0
	DF	(Norway) NOR	Warren Kamanzi	0	0	0+0	0	0+0	0	0+0	0
	MF	(Norway) NOR	Mikael Tørset Johnsen	0	0	0+0	0	0+0	0	0+0	0
Players who appeared for Rosenborg no longer at the club:
10	FW	(Sweden) SWE	Guillermo Molins	11	2	5+5	2	0+0	0	0+1	0
18	MF	(Norway) NOR	Kristoffer Zachariassen	12	8	12+0	8	0+0	0	0+0	0

=== Disciplinary record ===
As of match played 12 December 2021

Number	Nation	Position	Name	Eliteserien		Norwegian Cup		Europa Conference League		Total	
Number	Nation	Position	Name	Booked	Sent off (straight red)	Booked	Sent off (straight red)	Booked	Sent off (straight red)	Booked	Sent off (straight red)
1	(Norway)	GK	André Hansen	0	0	0	0	0	0	0	0
2	(Norway)	DF	Erlend Dahl Reitan	4	0	1	0	2	0	7	0
3	(Sweden)	DF	Jonathan Augustinsson	2	0	0	0	0	0	2	0
4	(Norway)	MF	Vebjørn Hoff	3	0	0	0	1	0	4	0
5	(Norway)	MF	Per Ciljan Skjelbred	4	0	0	0	0	0	4	0
6	(Norway)	MF	Alexander Tettey	2	0	0	0	0	0	2	0
7	(Norway)	MF	Markus Henriksen	1	1	0	0	0	0	1	1
8	(Norway)	MF	Anders Konradsen	0	0	0	0	0	0	0	0
9	(Montenegro)	FW	Dino Islamović	3	0	1	0	1	0	5	0
11	(Denmark)	FW	Carlo Holse	0	0	0	0	0	0	0	0
13	(Norway)	GK	Julian Faye Lund	0	0	0	0	0	0	0	0
14	(Sweden)	FW	Rasmus Wiedesheim-Paul	0	0	0	0	0	0	0	0
15	(Iceland)	DF	Hólmar Örn Eyjólfsson	4	0	0	0	0	0	4	0
16	(Norway)	DF	Even Hovland	1	0	1	0	0	0	2	0
18	(Norway)	FW	Noah Holm	2	0	0	0	0	0	2	0
19	(Norway)	DF	Adrian Pereira	0	0	0	0	0	0	0	0
20	(Norway)	MF	Edvard Tagseth	3	0	1	0	2	0	6	0
21	(Norway)	MF	Olaus Skarsem	1	0	0	0	0	0	1	0
22	(Sweden)	FW	Stefano Vecchia	0	0	0	0	1	0	1	0
23	(Sweden)	MF	Pavle Vagić	1	0	0	0	0	0	1	0
24	(Norway)	GK	Sander Tangvik	0	0	0	0	0	0	0	0
25	(Sweden)	DF	Adam Andersson	3	1	0	0	1	0	4	1
26	(Bosnia and Herzegovina)	DF	Besim Šerbečić	1	0	0	0	0	0	1	0
35	(Norway)	FW	Emil Ceïde	2	0	1	0	0	0	3	0
36	(Norway)	MF	Ingmar Orkelbog Austberg	0	0	0	0	0	0	0	0
39	(Norway)	MF	Marius Sivertsen Broholm	0	0	0	0	0	0	0	0
42	(Norway)	FW	Magnus Hammerås	0	0	0	0	0	0	0	0
43	(Norway)	DF	Håkon Røsten	0	0	0	0	0	0	0	0
Players away from Rosenborg on loan:
22	(Norway)	MF	Gjermund Åsen	0	0	0	0	0	0	0	0
23	(Norway)	FW	Filip Brattbakk	0	0	0	0	0	0	0	0
27	(Norway)	FW	Ole Hammerfjell Sæter	0	0	0	0	0	0	0	0
37	(Norway)	FW	Paweł Chrupałła	0	0	0	0	0	0	0	0
38	(Norway)	DF	Mikkel Ceïde	0	0	0	0	0	0	0	0
	(Norway)	DF	Warren Kamanzi	0	0	0	0	0	0	0	0
	(Norway)	MF	Mikael Tørset Johnsen	0	0	0	0	0	0	0	0
Players who appeared for Rosenborg no longer at the club:
10	(Sweden)	FW	Guillermo Molins	1	0	0	0	0	0	1	0
18	(Norway)	MF	Kristoffer Zachariassen	4	0	0	0	0	0	4	0
			TOTALS	42	2	5	0	8	0	54	2

== See also ==
- Rosenborg BK seasons
