= 2020 Rosenborg BK season =

Rosenborg
2020 season
- Chairman: Ivar Koteng
- Coach: Eirik Horneland (until 26 June); Trond Henriksen (Interim) (from 27 June to 31 August); Åge Hareide (from 1 September)
- Stadium: Lerkendal Stadion
- Eliteserien: 4th
- Europa League: Play-off round vs PSV Eindhoven
- Top goalscorer: League: Dino Islamović; Kristoffer Zachariassen (12 each); All: Dino Islamović (14 goals)
- Highest home attendance: 600 (Due to COVID-19 restrictions)
- Lowest home attendance: 200 (Due to COVID-19 restrictions)
- Average home league attendance: 307 (Due to COVID-19 restrictions)
Home colours	Away colours	Third colours

The 2020 season was Rosenborg's 41st consecutive year in the top flight now known as Eliteserien, their 53rd season in the top flight of Norwegian football. They participated in the Eliteserien, the Cup and Europa League entering at the First Qualifying round. The end of the pre-season and the start of the season were postponed due to the COVID-19 pandemic. After two months, the season was confirmed to start 16 June, with full training starting from 7 May. This was Eirik Horneland's second season as Rosenborg manager, but he was let go after only three matches. Trond Henriksen took over as interim manager until Åge Hareide was appointed new manager. Due to the COVID-19 pandemic only 200 fans were allowed in the stadiums the first 20 rounds, while 600 fans were allowed in the remaining 10 rounds.

== Squad ==
Note: Flags indicate national team as defined under FIFA eligibility rules; some limited exceptions apply. Players may hold more than one non-FIFA nationality.

No.	Pos.	Nation	Player
1	GK	(Norway) NOR	André Hansen
2	DF	(Norway) NOR	Vegar Eggen Hedenstad
4	DF	(Norway) NOR	Tore Reginiussen (captain)
5	MF	(Norway) NOR	Per Ciljan Skjelbred
7	MF	(Norway) NOR	Markus Henriksen
8	MF	(Norway) NOR	Anders Konradsen
9	FW	(Montenegro) MNE	Dino Islamović
10	FW	(Norway) NOR	Pål André Helland
11	FW	(Denmark) DEN	Carlo Holse
13	GK	(Norway) NOR	Julian Faye Lund
14	FW	(Sweden) SWE	Rasmus Wiedesheim-Paul
15	DF	(Iceland) ISL	Hólmar Örn Eyjólfsson

No.	Pos.	Nation	Player
16	DF	(Norway) NOR	Even Hovland
18	MF	(Norway) NOR	Kristoffer Zachariassen
20	MF	(Norway) NOR	Edvard Tagseth
21	DF	(Norway) NOR	Erlend Dahl Reitan
22	MF	(Norway) NOR	Gjermund Åsen
24	GK	(Norway) NOR	Sander Tangvik
25	DF	(Guinea) GUI	Pa Konate
26	DF	(Norway) NOR	Warren Kamanzi
28	FW	(Nigeria) NGA	Samuel Adegbenro
35	FW	(Norway) NOR	Emil Ceïde
40	GK	(Norway) NOR	Rasmus Semundseth Sandberg

== Transfers ==
=== Winter ===
In: Note: Flags indicate national team as defined under FIFA eligibility rules; some limited exceptions apply. Players may hold more than one non-FIFA nationality.

No.	Pos.	Nation	Player
9	FW	(Montenegro) MNE	Dino Islamović (from (Sweden) Östersunds FK)
11	FW	(Denmark) DEN	Carlo Holse (from (Denmark) F.C. Copenhagen)
13	GK	(Norway) NOR	Julian Faye Lund (loan return from (Norway) Mjøndalen)
18	MF	(Norway) NOR	Kristoffer Zachariassen (from (Norway) Sarpsborg 08)
21	DF	(Norway) NOR	Erlend Dahl Reitan (loan return from (Norway) Bodø/Glimt)
23	FW	(Sweden) SWE	Jonathan Levi (loan return from (Sweden) Elfsborg)

Out: Note: Flags indicate national team as defined under FIFA eligibility rules; some limited exceptions apply. Players may hold more than one non-FIFA nationality.

No.	Pos.	Nation	Player
5	MF	(Serbia) SRB	Đorđe Denić (on loan to (Cyprus) Apollon Limassol)
7	MF	(Denmark) DEN	Mike Jensen (to (Cyprus) APOEL)
11	FW	(Norway) NOR	Yann-Erik de Lanlay (to (Norway) Viking)
14	FW	(Norway) NOR	Alexander Søderlund (to (Sweden) Häcken)
17	FW	(Nigeria) NGA	David Akintola (loan return to (Denmark) FC Midtjylland)
23	FW	(Norway) NOR	Bjørn Maars Johnsen (loan return to (Netherlands) AZ)
23	FW	(Sweden) SWE	Jonathan Levi (to (Sweden) Norrköping)
24	GK	(Norway) NOR	Arild Østbø (to (Norway) Viking)
30	DF	(Nigeria) NGA	Igoh Ogbu (on loan to (Norway) Sogndal)
—	MF	(Norway) NOR	Tobias Bjørnebye (to (Norway) Sogndal)
—	DF	(Norway) NOR	Torbjørn Lysaker Heggem (on loan to (Norway) Ranheim)
—	MF	(Norway) NOR	Olaus Skarsem (to (Norway) Kristiansund)

=== Summer ===
In: Note: Flags indicate national team as defined under FIFA eligibility rules; some limited exceptions apply. Players may hold more than one non-FIFA nationality.

No.	Pos.	Nation	Player
5	MF	(Norway) NOR	Per Ciljan Skjelbred (free agent from (Germany) Hertha Berlin)
7	MF	(Norway) NOR	Markus Henriksen (free agent from (England) Hull City)
14	FW	(Norway) NOR	Torgeir Børven (from (Norway) Odd)
14	FW	(Sweden) SWE	Rasmus Wiedesheim-Paul (from (Sweden) Halmstad)
15	DF	(Iceland) ISL	Hólmar Örn Eyjólfsson (free agent from (Bulgaria) Levski Sofia)
23	MF	(Norway) NOR	Filip Brattbakk (from the academy)
25	DF	(Guinea) GUI	Pa Konate (from (Sweden) Jönköpings Södra)
26	DF	(Norway) NOR	Waren Kamanzi (from the academy)

Out: Note: Flags indicate national team as defined under FIFA eligibility rules; some limited exceptions apply. Players may hold more than one non-FIFA nationality.

No.	Pos.	Nation	Player
3	DF	(Norway) NOR	Birger Meling (to (France) Nîmes)
14	FW	(Norway) NOR	Torgeir Børven (to (Turkey) Ankaragücü)
15	MF	(Norway) NOR	Anders Trondsen (to (Turkey) Trabzonspor)
19	DF	(Norway) NOR	Gustav Valsvik (on loan to (Norway) Stabæk)
23	MF	(Norway) NOR	Filip Brattbakk (on loan to (Norway) Raufoss)
25	MF	(Norway) NOR	Marius Lundemo (to (Cyprus) APOEL)
26	DF	(Bosnia and Herzegovina) BIH	Besim Šerbečić (Extended loan to (Bosnia and Herzegovina) Sarajevo)
30	DF	(Nigeria) NGA	Igoh Ogbu (to (Norway) Sogndal, previously on loan)
34	FW	(Norway) NOR	Erik Botheim (on loan to (Norway) Stabæk)
37	MF	(Norway) NOR	Mikael Tørset Johnsen (on loan to (Netherlands) Feyenoord U21)
39	DF	(Norway) NOR	Sondre Skogen (on loan to (Netherlands) Feyenoord U21)
41	DF	(Norway) NOR	Franklin Daddys Boy Nyenetue (to (Norway) Stjørdals-Blink)

== Friendlies ==
1 February 2020	Rosenborg (Norway)	2–1	(Norway) Stjørdals-Blink	Hommelvik
14:00 UTC (UTC+1)	Helland 16'; Islamović 67'	Summary	Lillebo 37'	Stadium: Abrahallen

8 February 2020	Rosenborg (Norway)	5–1	(Sweden) GIF Sundsvall	Hommelvik
15:00 UTC (UTC+1)	Helland 10'; Hovland 17'; Zachariassen 40'; Tørset Johnsen 61'; Botheim 79'	Summary	Nuur 77'	Stadium: Abrahallen

14 February 2020	Kristiansund (Norway)	3–1	(Norway) Rosenborg	Kristiansund
17:00 UTC (UTC+1)	Kastrati 20', 37', 44'	Summary	Helland 58' (pen.)	Stadium: Kristiansund Stadion

21 February 2020	Ranheim (Norway)	2–4	(Norway) Rosenborg	Trondheim
16:00 UTC (UTC+1)	Tønne 18'; Kvande 56'	Summary	Islamović 7', 41'; Zachariassen 30'; Helland 43'	Stadium: EXTRA Arena

28 February 2020	Odd (Norway)	4–5	(Norway) Rosenborg	Skien
??:?? UTC (UTC+1)	Børven 20'; Nordkvelle 45', 48', 56'	Summary	Konradsen 22'; Helland 71' (pen.); Botheim 77'; Åsen 82'; Hedenstad 86'	Stadium: Skagerak Arena; Referee: Rohit Saggi

5 March 2020	Rosenborg (Norway)	3–1	(Norway) Bodø/Glimt	Hommelvik
15:00 UTC (UTC+1)	Islamović 48'; Adegbenro 52'; Zachariassen 60'	Summary	Berg 55'	Stadium: Abrahallen

11 March 2020	Marbella (Spain)	Cancelled	(Norway) Rosenborg	Marbella, Spain
??:?? UTC (UTC+1)

20 March 2020	Aalesund (Norway)	Cancelled	(Norway) Rosenborg	Ålesund
14:00 UTC (UTC+1)				Stadium: Color Line Stadion

28 March 2020	Rosenborg (Norway)	Cancelled	(Sweden) Östersund	Hommelvik
16:00 UTC (UTC+1)				Stadium: Abrahallen

30 May 2020	Rosenborg (Norway)	1–0	(Norway) Bodø/Glimt	Trondheim
16:00 UTC (UTC+1)	7'; Zachariassen	Summary		Stadium: Lerkendal Idrettspark

4 June 2020	Stjørdals-Blink (Norway)	1–3	(Norway) Rosenborg	Stjørdal
18:00 UTC (UTC+1)	Stokke 41' (pen.)	Summary	Holse 32'; Meling 89'; Botheim 90+3'	Stadium: Nye Blinkbanen

9 June 2020	Rosenborg (Norway)	1–0	(Norway) Ranheim	Trondheim
18:00 UTC (UTC+1)	Adegbenro 41'	Summary		Stadium: Lerkendal Stadion

== Competitions ==
=== Eliteserien ===
==== Results summary ====
Overall								Home						Away					
Pld	W	D	L	GF	GA	GD	Pts	W	D	L	GF	GA	GD	W	D	L	GF	GA	GD
30	15	7	8	50	35	+15	52	10	3	2	34	16	+18	5	4	6	16	19	−3

Last updated: 22 December 2020.
Source: see below

==== Results by round ====
Round	1	2	3	4	5	6	7	8	9	10	11	12	13	14	15	16	17	18	19	20	21	22	23	24	25	26	27	28	29	30
Ground	H	B	H	B	H	B	H	B	H	B	H	B	H	H	B	H	B	H	B	H	B	B	H	B	H	B	H	B	H	B
Result	D	L	L	W	D	W	W	D	W	L	W	L	W	W	W	D	D	W	W	W	D	W	W	L	L	L	W	L	W	D
Position	8	11	12	10	11	7	5	6	4	6	5	6	5	4	4	4	4	4	2	2	3	3	3	3	4	4	3	4	4	4

Updated to match(es) played on 22 December 2020. Source: see below
A = Away; H = Home; W = Win; D = Draw; L = Loss

==== Results ====
16 June 2020 1	Rosenborg	0–0	Kristiansund	Trondheim
18:00 CEST (UTC+2)	Trondsen (yellow card) 65'	Summary	Hopmark (yellow card) 58'	Stadium: Lerkendal Stadion; Attendance: 200 (Due to COVID-19 restrictions); Referee: Espen Eskås

20 June 2020 2	Molde	1–0	Rosenborg	Molde
20:30 CEST (UTC+2)	Omoijuanfo 47'; Haugen (yellow card) 89'	Summary	Zachariassen (yellow card) 41'; Trondsen (yellow card) 60'	Stadium: Aker Stadion; Attendance: 200 (Due to COVID-19 restrictions); Referee: Svein Oddvar Mone

25 June 2020 3	Rosenborg	2–3	Bodø/Glimt	Trondheim
20:30 CEST (UTC+2)	Meling (red card) 52'; Islamović (yellow card) 60'; Bjørkan 67' (o.g.); Helland (yellow card) 80'; Trondsen 82'	Summary	Zinckernagel 22' (pen.); Saltnes (yellow card) 81'; Junker 87'; Solbakken 90'; Bjørkan (yellow card) 90+1'	Stadium: Lerkendal Stadion; Attendance: 200 (Due to COVID-19 restrictions); Referee: Tom Harald Hagen

28 June 2020 4	Brann	1–2	Rosenborg	Bergen
20:30 CEST (UTC+2)	Koomson 5' (yellow card) 50'; Strand (yellow card) 45'	Summary	Hovland 45+2'; Islamović (yellow card) 71'; Holse 90'	Stadium: Brann Stadion; Attendance: 200 (Due to COVID-19 restrictions); Referee: Tore Hansen

1 July 2020 5	Rosenborg	1–1	Vålerenga	Trondheim
20:30 CEST (UTC+2)	Hedenstad (yellow card) 3'; Lundemo 20'; Zachariassen (yellow card) 56'; Holse (yellow card) 74'	Summary	Borchgrevink (yellow card) 76'; Näsberg 79'; Horn Myhre (yellow card) 87'	Stadium: Lerkendal Stadion; Attendance: 200 (Due to COVID-19 restrictions); Referee: Kai Erik Steen

5 July 2020 6	Stabæk	0–3	Rosenborg	Bærum
20:30 CEST (UTC+2)		Summary	Trondsen (yellow card) 18'; Åsen (yellow card) 24'; Valsvik 59'; Islamović 66'; Zachariassen 73'	Stadium: Nadderud Stadion; Attendance: 200 (Due to COVID-19 restrictions); Referee: Svein Oddvar Moen

11 July 2020 7	Rosenborg	3–0	Strømsgodset	Trondheim
20:30 CEST (UTC+2)	Helland 68'; Zachariassen (yellow card) 78' (goal) 81'; Børven 90+2'	Summary	Parr (yellow card) 35'; Jack (yellow card) 43'	Stadium: Lerkendal Stadion; Attendance: 200 (Due to COVID-19 restrictions); Referee: Ola Hobber Nilsen

16 July 2020 8	Start	0–0	Rosenborg	Kristiansand
20:30 CEST (UTC+2)	Aremu (yellow card) 50'; Bergan (yellow card) 64'; Daland (yellow card) 90+2'	Summary	Islamović (yellow card) 30'	Stadium: SØR-Arena; Attendance: 200 (Due to COVID-19 restrictions); Referee: Kristoffer Hagenes

19 July 2020 9	Rosenborg	2–1	Sandefjord	Trondheim
18:00 CEST (UTC+2)	Tagseth (yellow card) 7'; Zachariassen 15', 73'; Helland (yellow card) 64'; Hovland (yellow card) 65'	Summary	Pálsson (yellow card) 48'; Rufo 80'; Brenden (yellow card) 85'	Stadium: Lerkendal Stadion; Attendance: 200 (Due to COVID-19 restrictions); Referee: Tore Hansen

26 July 2020 10	Haugesund	1–0	Rosenborg	Haugesund
20:30 CEST (UTC+2)	Sandberg 9' (pen.); Stølås (yellow card) 58'	Summary	Reitan (yellow card) 22'; Åsen (yellow card) 63'; Zachariassen (yellow card) 69'; Islamović (yellow card) 89'; Reginiussen (yellow card) 90+4'	Stadium: Haugesund Stadion; Attendance: 200 (Due to COVID-19 restrictions); Referee: Rohit Saggi

30 July 2020 11	Rosenborg	3–0	Viking	Trondheim
20:30 CEST (UTC+2)	Helland 40'; Hovland 56'; Børven 78'	Summary	Torsteinbø (yellow card) 26'; Bell (yellow card) 38'	Stadium: Lerkendal Stadion; Attendance: 200 (Due to COVID-19 restrictions); Referee: Espen Eskås

2 August 2020 12	Odd	2–1	Rosenborg	Skien
20:30CEST (UTC+2)	Lunding 28'; Dahl Reitan 55' (o.g.)	Summary	Hovland (yellow card) 36'; Helland (yellow card) 46'; Holse 67'	Stadium: Skagerak Arena; Attendance: 200 (Due to COVID-19 restrictions); Referee: Tommy Skjerven

9 August 2020 13	Rosenborg	5–1	Sarpsborg 08	Trondheim
20:30 CEST (UTC+2)	Åsen 4'; Holse 62', 68'; Zachariassen 79'; Islamović 90'	Summary	Utvik (yellow card) 20'; Coulibaly 26'	Stadium: Lerkendal Stadion; Attendance: 200 (Due to COVID-19 restrictions); Referee: Tore Hansen

16 August 2020 14	Rosenborg	3–2	Aalesund	Trondheim
20:30 CEST (UTC+2)	Islamović 32' (pen.) 34' (yellow card) 38'; Zachariassen 45'	Summary	Friðjónsson 16', 69'; Kongshavn (yellow card) 31'; Carlsen (yellow card) 45+2'; Bolkan Nordli (yellow card) 51'	Stadium: Lerkendal Stadion; Attendance: 200 (Due to COVID-19 restrictions); Referee: Rohit Saggi

22 August 2020 15	Mjøndalen	0–2	Rosenborg	Mjøndalen
20:30 CEST (UTC+2)	Brochmann (yellow card) 82'; Makani (yellow card) 85'	Summary	Tagseth (yellow card) 4'; Åsen 33'; Zachariassen 43'; Islamović (penalty missed) 77'; Hedenstad (yellow card) 86'	Stadium: Consto Arena; Attendance: 200 (Due to COVID-19 restrictions); Referee: Espen Eskås

30 August 2020 16	Rosenborg	2–2	Stabæk	Trondheim
18:00 CEST (UTC+2)	Tagseth 12'; Børven 56' (pen.); Hedenstad (yellow card) 90+3'	Summary	Vetlesen 48'; Jonassen (yellow card) 79'; Edvardsen 84'	Stadium: Lerkendal Stadion; Attendance: 200 (Due to COVID-19 restrictions); Referee: Tommy Skjerven

13 September 2020 17	Strømsgodset	3–3	Rosenborg	Drammen
18:00 CEST (UTC+2)	Salvesen 16'; Hedenstad 18' (o.g.); Vilsvik (yellow card) 31'; Gunnarsson (yellow card) 34'; Hove 59'	Summary	Børven 22'; Skjelbred 84'; Islamović 87'	Stadium: Marienlyst Stadion; Attendance: 200 (Due to COVID-19 restrictions); Referee: Sivert Øksnes Amland

20 September 2020 18	Rosenborg	2–1	Haugesund	Trondheim
18:00 CEST (UTC+2)	Eyjólfsson (yellow card) 22'; Islamović 50' (yellow card) 90'; Hedenstad 80'	Summary	Velde 10'; Pallesen Knudsen (yellow card) 18'	Stadium: Lerkendal Stadion; Attendance: 200 (Due to COVID-19 restrictions); Referee: Ola Hobber Nilsen

27 September 2020 19	Aalesund	1–2	Rosenborg	Ålesund
18:00 CEST (UTC+2)	Orry Larsen (yellow card) 43'; Haugen 62' (yellow card) 83'; Carlsen (yellow card) 73'; Grønner (yellow card) 89'; Castro (yellow card) 90+2'	Summary	Zachariassen 41', 68'	Stadium: Color Line Stadion; Attendance: 200 (Due to COVID-19 restrictions); Referee: Mohammad Usman Aslam

4 October 2020 20	Rosenborg	4–1	Odd	Trondheim
20:30 CEST (UTC+2)	Dahl Reitan 42'; Tagseth (yellow card) 65'; Zachariassen 70'; Islamović 78' 83' (pen.)	Summary	Ruud (yellow card) 19'; Simović 74'	Stadium: Lerkendal Stadion; Attendance: 200 (Due to COVID-19 restrictions); Referee: Espen Eskås

18 October 2020 21	Kristiansund	0–0	Rosenborg	Kristiansund
18:00 CEST (UTC+2)	Diop (yellow card) 21'	Summary	Konate (yellow card) 47'	Stadium: Kristiansund Stadion; Attendance: 600 (Due to COVID-19 restrictions); Referee: Tore Hansen

25 October 2020 22	Sarpsborg 08	1–2	Rosenborg	Sarpsborg
18:00CEST (UTC+2)	Halvorsen (yellow card) 12'; Lindseth 70'	Summary	Hedenstad (yellow card) 8'; Islamović 13' (pen.); Konate 24'; Reginiussen (yellow card) 58'; Dahl Reitan (yellow card) 88'	Stadium: Sarpsborg Stadion; Attendance: 600 (Due to COVID-19 restrictions); Referee: Rohit Saggi

1 November 2020 23	Rosenborg	1–0	Start	Trondheim
18:00 CEST (UTC+2)	Holse 67'	Summary	Wichne (yellow card) 26'; El Makrini (yellow card) 53' (yellow-red card) 90+1'	Stadium: Lerkendal Stadion; Attendance: 600 (Due to COVID-19 restrictions); Referee: Sivert Øksnes Amland

8 November 2020 24	Viking	3–0	Rosenborg	Stavanger
18:00 CEST (UTC+2)	Berisha 9' (pen.) de Lanlay 20'; Vevatne 42'; Ibrahimaj (yellow card) 85'; Høiland (yellow card) 90+3'	Summary	Islamović (yellow card) 41'	Stadium: Viking Stadion; Attendance: 600 (Due to COVID-19 restrictions); Referee: Kai Erik Steen

22 November 2020 25	Rosenborg	2–3	Brann	Trondheim
20:00 CEST (UTC+2)	Zachariassen 81'; Eyjólfsson 90+3'	Summary	Taylor 22' (yellow card) 90+4'; Bamba 23'; Svendsen 47'; Strand (yellow card) 90+1'	Stadium: Lerkendal Stadion; Attendance: 600 (Due to COVID-19 restrictions); Referee: Tore Hansen

29 November 2020 26	Bodø/Glimt	5–1	Rosenborg	Bodø
18:00 CEST (UTC+2)	Junker 15'; Solbakken 27' (yellow card) 48'; Zinckernagel 78'; Leikvoll Moberg 85'; Konradsen 87'	Summary	Ceïde (yellow card) 41'; Dahl Reitan (yellow card) 60'; Islamović 83'	Stadium: Aspmyra Stadion; Attendance: 600 (Due to COVID-19 restrictions); Referee: Rohit Saggi

7 December 2020 28	Vålerenga	1–0	Rosenborg	Oslo
18:00 CEST (UTC+2)	Shala (yellow card) 23'; Näsberg (yellow card) 37'; Dønnum 76'	Summary	Islamović (yellow card) 22' (yellow-red card) 45+1'; Reginiussen (yellow card) 32'; Henriksen (yellow card) 45+1'	Stadium: Intility Arena; Attendance: 200 (Due to COVID-19 restrictions); Referee: Sigurd Smehus Kringstad

10 December 2020 29	Rosenborg	1–0	Mjøndalen	Trondheim
18:00 CEST (UTC+2)	Zachariassen 90+5'	Summary		Stadium: Lerkendal Stadion; Attendance: 600 (Due to COVID-19 restrictions); Referee: Tore Hansen

13 December 2020 27	Rosenborg	3–1	Molde	Trondheim
18:00 CEST (UTC+2)	Zachariassen (yellow card) 6'; Islamović 8' 83' (pen.); Konate (yellow card) 39'; Reginiussen 49' (yellow card) 84'	Summary	Sinyan (yellow card) 14'; Ohi 20'; Hussain (yellow card) 32'	Attendance: 600 (Due to COVID-19 restrictions); Referee: Espen Eskås

22 December 2020 30	Sandefjord	0–0	Rosenborg	Sandefjord
18:00 CEST (UTC+2)	Kreuzriegler (yellow card) 55'; Grorud (yellow card) 58'; Normann Hansen (yellow card) 89'			Stadium: Sandefjord Arena; Attendance: 600 (Due to COVID-19 restrictions); Referee: Rohit Saggi

==== Table ====
Pos	Team	Pld	W	D	L	GF	GA	GD	Pts	Qualification or relegation
2	Molde	30	20	2	8	77	36	+41	62	Qualification for the Europa Conference League second qualifying round
3	Vålerenga	30	15	10	5	51	33	+18	55	Qualification for the Europa Conference League second qualifying round
4	Rosenborg	30	15	7	8	50	35	+15	52	Qualification for the Europa Conference League second qualifying round
5	Kristiansund	30	12	12	6	57	45	+12	48	
6	Viking	30	12	8	10	54	52	+2	44	

Source: Football Association of Norway (in Norwegian)
Rules for classification: 1) Points; 2) Goal difference; 3) Goals scored; 4) Head-to-head points; 5) Head-to-head goal difference; 6) Head-to-head away goals scored (only if between two teams); 7) Head-to-head goals scored; 8) Play-off (only used to decide champions or relegation).

=== Norwegian Cup ===
2020 First Round	Cancelled
??:?? CEST (UTC+2)

=== UEFA Europa League ===
==== Qualifying rounds ====
27 August 2020 1st qualifying round	Rosenborg (Norway)	4–2	(Iceland) Breiðablik	Trondheim
19:00 CEST (UTC+2)	Børven 4', 29'; Reginiussen 17'; Hovland 24'; Zachariassen (yellow card) 30'; Åsen (yellow card) 45+3'; Holse (yellow card) 90'	Summary	Helgi Sigurðason (yellow card) 26'; Andersen Willumsson (yellow card) 57'; Einarsson 60'; Mikkelsen 90+1', pen.'	Stadium: Lerkendal Stadion; Attendance: 0 (Due to COVID-19 restrictions); Referee: Matthew De Gabriele (Malta)

17 September 2020 2nd qualifying round	Ventspils (Latvia)	1–5	(Norway) Rosenborg	Ventspils, Latvia
14:15 CEST (UTC+2)	Kozlov 5'; Svārups (yellow card) 13'; Litvinskis (red card) 63'	Summary	Islamović 15' (pen.) (yellow card) 45' (goal) 45+2''; Konradsen 37'; Holse 64'; Zachariassen 71'	Attendance: 0 (Due to COVID-19 restrictions); Referee: Paul Mclaughlin (Republic of Ireland)

24 September 2020 3rd qualifying round	Rosenborg (Norway)	1–0	(Turkey) Alanyaspor	Trondheim
19:00 CEST (UTC+2)	Reginiussen (yellow card) 19'; Zachariassen (yellow card) 28'; Konradsen 59' (yellow card) 53' (yellow-red card) 66'; Eyjólfsson (yellow card) 63'	Summary	Moubandje (yellow card) 57'; Bakasetas (yellow card) 68'; Uçan (yellow card) 76'; Babacar (yellow card) 90+3' (red card) 90+3'	Stadium: Lerkendal Stadion; Attendance: 0 (Due to COVID-19 restrictions); Referee: Kristo Tohver (Estonia)

1 October 2020 Play-off round	Rosenborg (Norway)	0–2	(Netherlands) PSV Eindhoven	Trondheim
19:00 CEST (UTC+2)	Adegbenro (yellow card) 63'; Konate (yellow card) 90'	Summary	Rosario (yellow card) 16'; Zahavi 22'; Hendrix (yellow card) 58'; Gakpo 61'; Dumfries (yellow card) 87'	Stadium: Lerkendal Stadion; Attendance: 0 (Due to COVID-19 restrictions); Referee: Davide Massa (Italy)

== Squad statistics ==
=== Appearances and goals ===
As of match played 22 December 2020

No.	Pos	Nat	Player	Total		Eliteserien		Norwegian Cup		Europa League	
No.	Pos	Nat	Player	Apps	Goals	Apps	Goals	Apps	Goals	Apps	Goals
1	GK	(Norway) NOR	André Hansen	22	0	19+0	0	0+0	0	3+0	0
2	DF	(Norway) NOR	Vegar Eggen Hedenstad	23	1	17+2	1	0+0	0	4+0	0
4	DF	(Norway) NOR	Tore Reginiussen	29	2	26+0	1	0+0	0	3+0	1
5	MF	(Norway) NOR	Per Ciljan Skjelbred	18	1	14+1	1	0+0	0	3+0	0
7	MF	(Norway) NOR	Markus Henriksen	10	0	9+0	0	0+0	0	1+0	0
8	MF	(Norway) NOR	Anders Konradsen	13	2	10+1	0	0+0	0	2+0	2
9	FW	(Montenegro) MNE	Dino Islamović	31	14	21+6	12	0+0	0	4+0	2
10	FW	(Norway) NOR	Pål André Helland	20	2	13+6	2	0+0	0	0+1	0
11	FW	(Denmark) DEN	Carlo Holse	34	6	17+13	5	0+0	0	4+0	1
13	GK	(Norway) NOR	Julian Faye Lund	13	0	11+1	0	0+0	0	1+0	0
14	FW	(Sweden) SWE	Rasmus Wiedesheim-Paul	4	0	1+3	0	0+0	0	0+0	0
15	DF	(Iceland) ISL	Hólmar Örn Eyjólfsson	12	1	9+1	1	0+0	0	2+0	0
16	DF	(Norway) NOR	Even Hovland	20	3	17+1	2	0+0	0	2+0	1
18	MF	(Norway) NOR	Kristoffer Zachariassen	33	13	29+0	12	0+0	0	4+0	1
20	MF	(Norway) NOR	Edvard Tagseth	28	1	11+15	1	0+0	0	1+1	0
21	DF	(Norway) NOR	Erlend Dahl Reitan	26	1	19+3	1	0+0	0	2+2	0
22	MF	(Norway) NOR	Gjermund Åsen	24	2	13+9	2	0+0	0	1+1	0
24	GK	(Norway) NOR	Sander Tangvik	0	0	0+0	0	0+0	0	0+0	0
25	DF	(Guinea) GUI	Pa Konate	13	1	11+0	1	0+0	0	2+0	0
26	DF	(Norway) NOR	Warren Kamanzi	1	0	0+0	0	0+0	0	0+1	0
28	FW	(Nigeria) NGA	Samuel Adegbenro	15	0	5+7	0	0+0	0	3+0	0
35	FW	(Norway) NOR	Emil Ceïde	29	0	19+9	0	0+0	0	0+1	0
40	GK	(Norway) NOR	Rasmus Semundseth Sandberg	0	0	0+0	0	0+0	0	0+0	0
Players away from Rosenborg on loan:
19	DF	(Norway) NOR	Gustav Valsvik	12	1	8+3	1	0+0	0	1+0	0
23	FW	(Norway) NOR	Filip Brattbakk	7	0	0+6	0	0+0	0	0+1	0
34	FW	(Norway) NOR	Erik Botheim	3	0	0+3	0	0+0	0	0+0	0
37	MF	(Norway) NOR	Mikael Tørset Johnsen	0	0	0+0	0	0+0	0	0+0	0
39	DF	(Norway) NOR	Sondre Skogen	0	0	0+0	0	0+0	0	0+0	0
	MF	(Serbia) SRB	Đorđe Denić	0	0	0+0	0	0+0	0	0+0	0
	DF	(Bosnia and Herzegovina) BIH	Besim Šerbečić	0	0	0+0	0	0+0	0	0+0	0
	DF	(Norway) NOR	Torbjørn Lysaker Heggem	0	0	0+0	0	0+0	0	0+0	0
Players who appeared for Rosenborg no longer at the club:
3	DF	(Norway) NOR	Birger Meling	3	0	2+1	0	0+0	0	0+0	0
14	FW	(Norway) NOR	Torgeir Børven	16	6	11+3	4	0+0	0	1+1	2
15	MF	(Norway) NOR	Anders Trondsen	13	1	12+1	1	0+0	0	0+0	0
25	MF	(Norway) NOR	Marius Lundemo	8	1	7+1	1	0+0	0	0+0	0
30	DF	(Nigeria) NGA	Igoh Ogbu	0	0	0+0	0	0+0	0	0+0	0

=== Disciplinary record ===
As of match played 22 December 2020

Number	Nation	Position	Name	Eliteserien		Norwegian Cup		Europa League		Total	
Number	Nation	Position	Name	Booked	Sent off (straight red)	Booked	Sent off (straight red)	Booked	Sent off (straight red)	Booked	Sent off (straight red)
1	(Norway)	GK	André Hansen	0	0	0	0	0	0	0	0
2	(Norway)	DF	Vegar Eggen Hedenstad	4	0	0	0	0	0	4	0
4	(Norway)	DF	Tore Reginiussen	4	0	0	0	1	0	5	0
5	(Norway)	MF	Per Ciljan Skjelbred	0	0	0	0	0	0	0	0
7	(Norway)	MF	Markus Henriksen	1	0	0	0	0	0	1	0
8	(Norway)	MF	Anders Konradsen	0	0	0	0	0	1	0	1
9	(Montenegro)	FW	Dino Islamović	7	1	0	0	1	0	8	1
10	(Norway)	FW	Pål André Helland	4	0	0	0	0	0	4	0
11	(Denmark)	FW	Carlo Holse	0	0	0	0	1	0	1	0
13	(Norway)	GK	Julian Faye Lund	0	0	0	0	0	0	0	0
14	(Sweden)	FW	Rasmus Wiedesheim-Paul	0	0	0	0	0	0	0	0
15	(Iceland)	DF	Hólmar Örn Eyjólfsson	1	0	0	0	1	0	2	0
16	(Norway)	DF	Even Hovland	2	0	0	0	0	0	2	0
18	(Norway)	MF	Kristoffer Zachariassen	5	0	0	0	2	0	7	0
20	(Norway)	MF	Edvard Tagseth	3	0	0	0	0	0	3	0
21	(Norway)	DF	Erlend Dahl Reitan	3	0	0	0	0	0	3	0
22	(Norway)	MF	Gjermund Åsen	2	0	0	0	1	0	3	0
24	(Norway)	GK	Sander Tangvik	0	0	0	0	0	0	0	0
25	(Guinea)	DF	Pa Konate	2	0	0	0	1	0	3	0
26	(Norway)	DF	Warren Kamanzi	0	0	0	0	0	0	0	0
28	(Nigeria)	FW	Samuel Adegbenro	0	0	0	0	1	0	1	0
35	(Norway)	FW	Emil Ceïde	1	0	0	0	0	0	1	0
40	(Norway)	GK	Rasmus Semundseth Sandberg	0	0	0	0	0	0	0	0
Players away from Rosenborg on loan:
19	(Norway)	DF	Gustav Valsvik	0	0	0	0	0	0	0	0
23	(Norway)	FW	Filip Brattbakk	0	0	0	0	0	0	0	0
34	(Norway)	FW	Erik Botheim	0	0	0	0	0	0	0	0
37	(Norway)	MF	Mikael Tørset Johnsen	0	0	0	0	0	0	0	0
39	(Norway)	DF	Sondre Skogen	0	0	0	0	0	0	0	0
	(Serbia)	MF	Đorđe Denić	0	0	0	0	0	0	0	0
	(Bosnia and Herzegovina)	DF	Besim Šerbečić	0	0	0	0	0	0	0	0
	(Norway)	DF	Torbjørn Lysaker Heggem	0	0	0	0	0	0	0	0
Players who appeared for Rosenborg no longer at the club:
3	(Norway)	DF	Birger Meling	0	1	0	0	0	0	0	1
14	(Norway)	FW	Torgeir Børven	0	0	0	0	0	0	0	0
15	(Norway)	MF	Anders Trondsen	3	0	0	0	0	0	3	0
25	(Norway)	MF	Marius Lundemo	0	0	0	0	0	0	0	0
30	(Nigeria)	DF	Igoh Ogbu	0	0	0	0	0	0	0	0
			TOTALS	42	2	0	0	9	1	51	3

== See also ==
- Rosenborg BK seasons
