= Erlend Dahl Reitan =

Norwegian footballer (born 1997)

Erlend Reitan
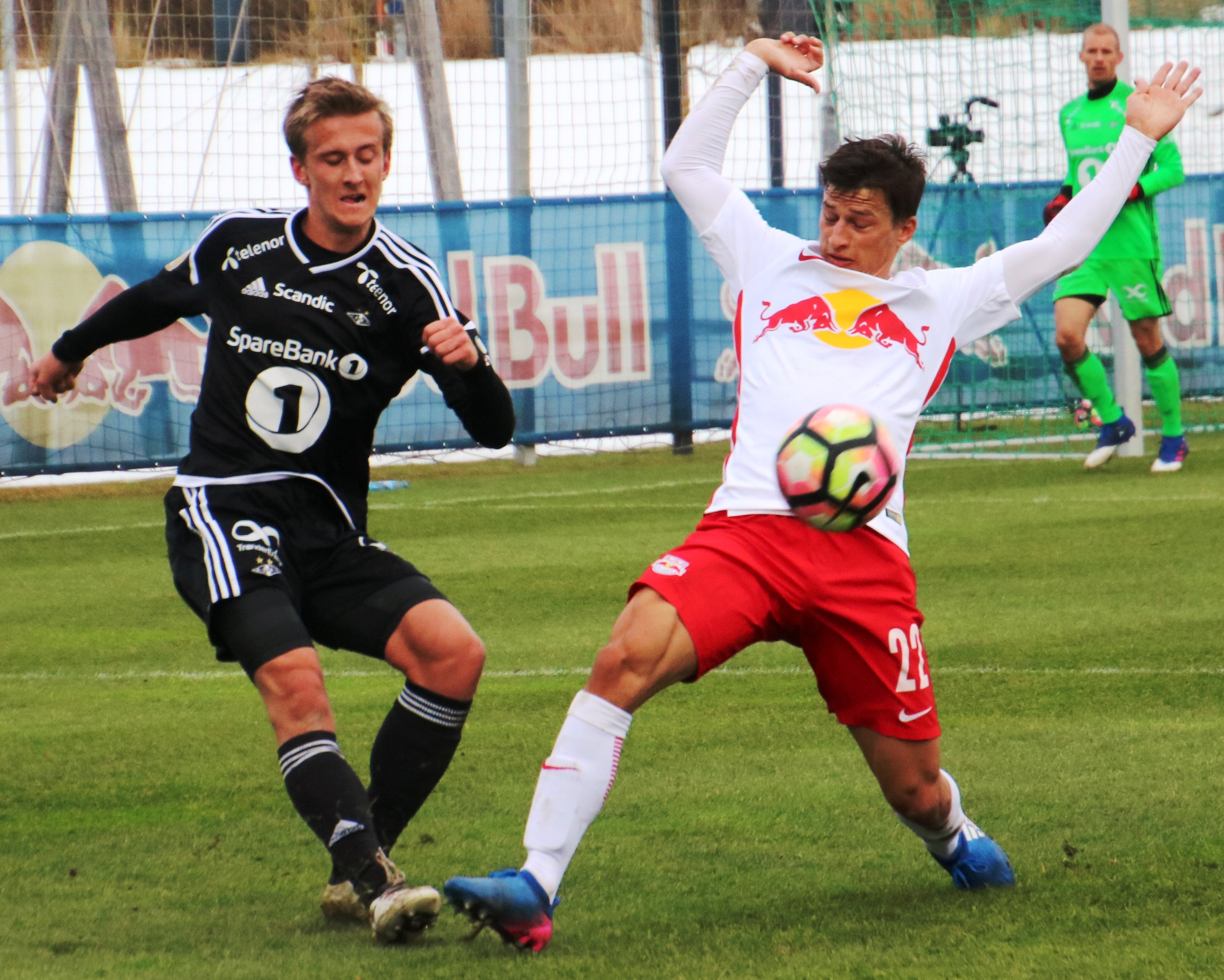

Personal information
- Full name: Erlend Dahl Reitan
- Date of birth: 11 September 1997 (age 29)
- Place of birth: Klæbu Municipality, Norway
- Height: 1.80 m (5 ft 11 in)
- Position: Right back

Team information
- Current team: Start
- Number: 29

Youth career
- –2012: Klæbu
- 2012–2016: Rosenborg

Senior career*
| Years | Team | Apps | (Gls) |
| 2015–2025 | Rosenborg | 157 | (9) |
| 2017 | → Bodø/Glimt (loan) | 13 | (2) |
| 2019 | → Bodø/Glimt (loan) | 29 | (1) |
| 2026– | Start | 22 | (2) |

International career^{‡}
| 2015–2016 | Norway U18 | 4 | (0) |
| 2016 | Norway U19 | 2 | (0) |
| 2017 | Norway U21 | 6 | (0) |
- * Club domestic league appearances and goals as of 19 October 2026 ‡ National team caps and goals as of 14:37, 19 April 2019 (UTC)

Erlend Dahl Reitan (born 11 September 1997) is a Norwegian professional footballer who plays as a right back for Eliteserien side Start.

== Club career ==
=== Rosenborg ===
Reitan is an academy graduate of Rosenborg. During his development with the club's junior sides he was deployed mainly as a winger before being converted to the right-back position following his promotion to the senior side. He made his non-competitive debut for Rosenborg on 27 March 2015 in a friendly match against Kristiansund, before making his competitive debut the following year, starting in a 5–1 win over Byåsen in the NM Cup on 27 April 2016. Having made a handful of cup appearances for the senior team, Reitan returned to the youth side and was part of the squad which beat Verdal 12–0 in a Championship match in June, scoring the second goal of the match in the process.

Reitan made his Tippeligaen debut on 18 September 2016 and scored from the penalty spot in a 2–0 win over Start. He scored again after just four minutes in his next appearance in a 3–1 win over Vålerenga and ended the season with two goals in four appearances. He made only one further appearance the following year before being loaned out to first division side Bodø/Glimt.

==== Loan to Bodø/Glimt ====
On 12 July 2017, Reitan officially joined Bodø/Glimt on loan for the remainder of the season. During his time at the club, he scored twice in 13 appearances before returning to Rosenborg, where he signed a new three-year contract.

== Career statistics ==
=== Club ===
As of match played 18 October 2026

Appearances and goals by club, season and competition
| Club | Season | League | | | National Cup | | Europe | | Other | | Total | |
| Club | Season | Division | Apps | Goals | Apps | Goals | Apps | Goals | Apps | Goals | Apps | Goals |
|---|---|---|---|---|---|---|---|---|---|---|---|---|
| Rosenborg | 2016 | Tippeligaen | 3 | 2 | 4 | 0 | 0 | 0 | — | | 7 | 2 |
| Rosenborg | 2017 | Eliteserien | 1 | 0 | 3 | 0 | — | | — | | 4 | 0 |
| Rosenborg | 2018 | Eliteserien | 9 | 0 | 4 | 0 | 6 (Note: One appearance in the UEFA Champions League, and five appearances in the UEFA Europa League) | 0 | 1 (Note: Appearance in the Mesterfinalen) | 0 | 20 | 0 |
| Rosenborg | 2020 | Eliteserien | 22 | 1 | — | | 4 (Note: Appearances in the UEFA Europa League) | 0 | — | | 26 | 1 |
| Rosenborg | 2021 | Eliteserien | 28 | 1 | 3 | 1 | 6 (Note: Appearances in the UEFA Europa Conference League) | 1 | — | | 37 | 3 |
| Rosenborg | 2022 | Eliteserien | 30 | 3 | 3 | 0 | — | | — | | 33 | 3 |
| Rosenborg | 2023 | Eliteserien | 20 | 0 | 1 | 0 | 4 | 0 | — | | 25 | 0 |
| Rosenborg | 2024 | Eliteserien | 24 | 2 | 1 | 0 | — | | — | | 25 | 2 |
| Rosenborg | 2025 | Eliteserien | 20 | 0 | 6 | 2 | 2 | 0 | — | | 28 | 2 |
| Rosenborg | Total | | 157 | 9 | 25 | 3 | 22 | 1 | 1 | 0 | 205 | 13 |
| Bodø/Glimt (loan) | 2017 | OBOS-ligaen | 13 | 2 | 0 | 0 | — | | — | | 13 | 2 |
| Bodø/Glimt (loan) | 2019 | Eliteserien | 29 | 1 | 1 | 0 | — | | — | | 30 | 1 |
| Bodø/Glimt (loan) | Total | | 42 | 3 | 1 | 0 | — | | — | | 43 | 3 |
| Start | 2026 | Eliteserien | 22 | 2 | 1 | 1 | — | | — | | 23 | 3 |
| Career total | | | 221 | 14 | 27 | 4 | 22 | 1 | 1 | 0 | 271 | 19 |

== Honours ==
=== Club ===
==== Rosenborg ====
- Norwegian League (2): 2016, 2018
- Norwegian Football Cup (2): 2016, 2018
- Norwegian U-19 Championship (1): 2015
- Norwegian U-16 Championship (1): 2013
- Norwegian Super Cup (1): 2018
