= Filip Brattbakk =

Norwegian footballer (born 2000)

Personal information
- Date of birth: 24 April 2000 (age 26)
- Place of birth: Copenhagen, Denmark
- Height: 1.81 m (5 ft 11 in)
- Position: Winger

Team information
- Current team: KÍ
- Number: 17

Youth career
- –2014: Trond
- 2015–2019: Rosenborg

Senior career*
Years	Team	Apps	(Gls)
2020–2022	Rosenborg	6	(0)
2020	Rosenborg 2	10	(0)
2020	→ Raufoss (loan)	15	(5)
2021	→ Ranheim (loan)	27	(5)
2022–2023	Raufoss	45	(3)
2024	07 Vestur	26	(8)
2025–	KÍ	48	(15)

International career^{‡}
2017	Norway U17	3	(1)
- * Club domestic league appearances and goals as of 1 November 2026 ‡ National team caps and goals as of 1 July 2020

Filip Brattbakk (born 24 April 2000) is a professional footballer who plays as a winger for KÍ. Born in Denmark, he has played for the Norway U17 national team internationally.

== Career ==
Filip Brattbakk joined Rosenborg ahead of 2015 from local club Trond. After spending several years in the academy, ahead of the 2020 season he was promoted to the senior squad and signed a new contract with the club. His debut came later in the year against Vålerenga on 1 July coming on as a substitute in the 89th minute. In January 2024, Brattbakk joined Faroe Islands Premier League side 07 Vestur.

== Personal life ==
He is the son of former Rosenborg, FC Copenhagen and Celtic player Harald Martin Brattbakk. Due to his father's stint at FC Copenhagen, Filip was born in Copenhagen.

== Career statistics ==
=== Club ===
As of match played 20 November 2021

Appearances and goals by club, season and competition
Club	Season	League			National cup		Europe		Other		Total	
Club	Season	Division	Apps	Goals	Apps	Goals	Apps	Goals	Apps	Goals	Apps	Goals
Rosenborg	2020	Eliteserien	6	0	–		1	0	0	0	7	0
Raufoss (loan)	2020	Norwegian First Division	15	5	0	0	0	0	1	0	16	5
Ranheim (loan)	2021	Norwegian First Division	27	5	2	2	0	0	–		29	7
Raufoss	2022	Norwegian First Division	0	0	0	0	0	0	–		0	0
Career total			49	10	2	2	1	0	1	0	52	12

== Honours ==
Rosenborg

- Norwegian U-19 Championship: 2019
- Norwegian U-16 Championship: 2016
