= Carlo Holse =

Danish footballer (born 1999)

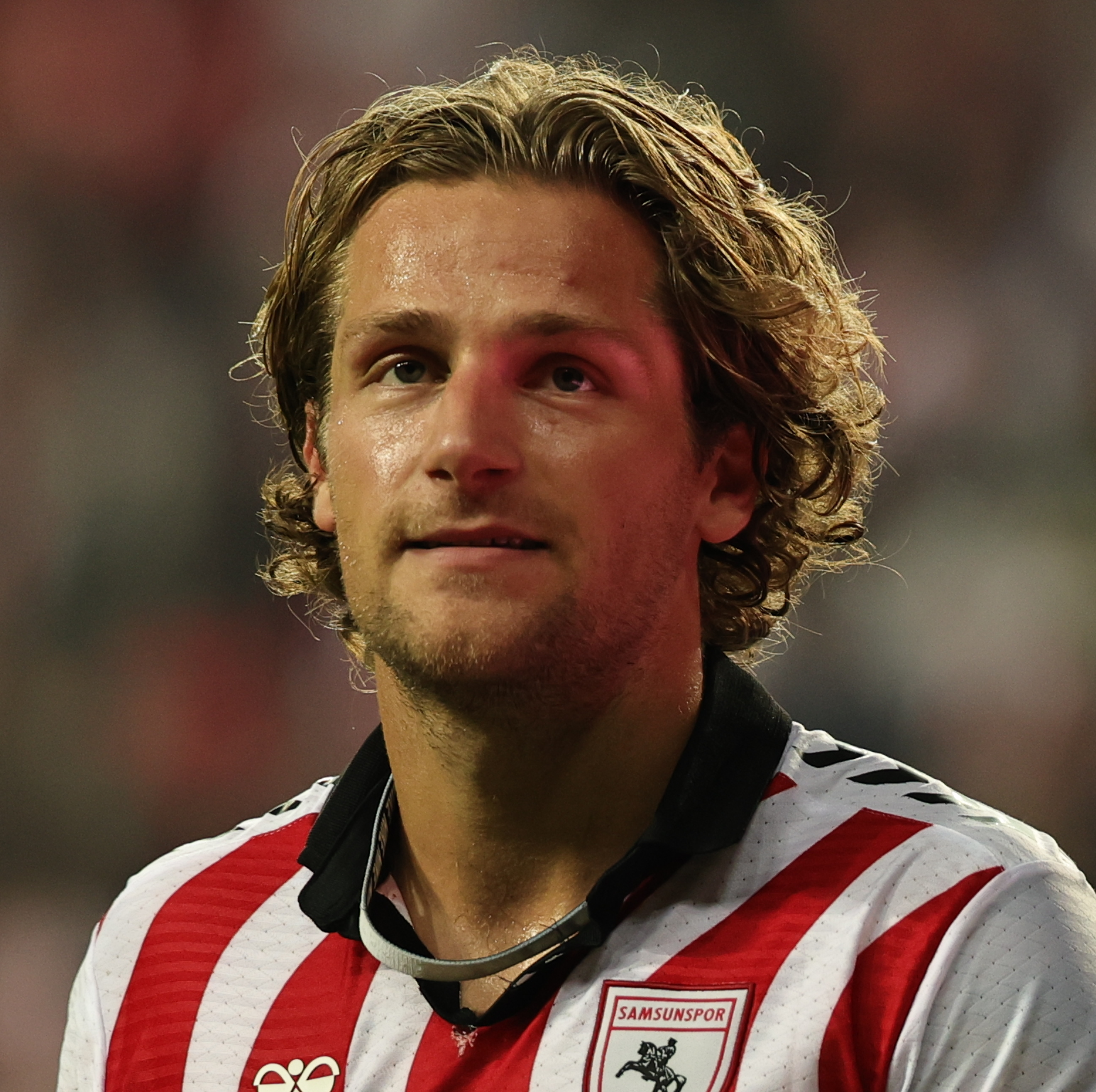
- Holse in 2025

Personal information
- Full name: Carl Johan Holse Justesen
- Date of birth: 2 June 1999 (age 27)
- Place of birth: Copenhagen, Denmark
- Height: 1.75 m (5 ft 9 in)
- Position: Right winger

Team information
- Current team: St. Louis City
- Number: 19

Youth career
- B 1903
- –2017: Copenhagen

Senior career*
Years	Team	Apps	(Gls)
2017–2020	Copenhagen	27	(1)
2019	→ Esbjerg fB (loan)	14	(3)
2020–2023	Rosenborg	102	(18)
2023–2026	Samsunspor	98	(20)
2026–	St. Louis City	11	(6)

International career^{‡}
2014–2015	Denmark U16	5	(0)
2015–2016	Denmark U17	9	(1)
2017	Denmark U18	2	(2)
2017–2018	Denmark U19	10	(2)
2018	Denmark U20	2	(1)
2019–2021	Denmark U21	14	(1)
2025–	Denmark	1	(0)
- * Club domestic league appearances and goals as of 23:32, 16 October 2026 (UTC) ‡ National team caps and goals as of 10 June 2025

Carl Johan Holse Justesen (born 2 June 1999) is a Danish professional footballer who plays as a right winger for Major League Soccer club St. Louis City and the Denmark national team.

== Club career ==
=== Copenhagen ===
Holse made his Danish Superliga debut for FC Copenhagen on 23 September 2017 in a game against Silkeborg.

On 30 January 2019, it was confirmed that Holse would be loaned out to Esbjerg fB in the Danish Superliga for the rest of the season. According to sources, Esbjerg had already tried to sign Holse in the summer 2018.

=== Rosenborg ===
On 31 January 2020, Holse signed a four-year deal with Rosenborg.

=== Samsunspor ===
On 1 September 2023, Holse joined Samsunspor in Turkey on a four-year deal.

=== St. Louis City ===
On 28 July 2026, Holse joined MLS club St. Louis City on a contract running until 2029, with an option to extend the agreement for an additional year.

== International career ==
In November 2020, he was called up to Kasper Hjulmand's Denmark national team for the friendly against Sweden due to several cancellations from, among others, the Danish national team players playing in England, due to the COVID-19 restrictions, as well as a case of COVID-19 in the squad, which had put several national team players in quarantine. He was on the bench for the game against Sweden.

On 6 June 2025, Holse was again called up to the national team under head coach Brian Riemer for two friendlies. Four days later on 10 June, Holse made his debut for the senior team in a match versus Lithuania. He was substituted onto the pitch in place of teammate Anders Dreyer in the 78th minute as Denmark won 5–0.

== Career statistics ==
=== Club ===
As of match played 14 October 2026

Appearances and goals by club, season and competition
Club	Season	League			National cup (Note: Includes Danish Cup, Norwegian Football Cup, Turkish Cup)		Continental		Total	
Club	Season	Division	Apps	Goals	Apps	Goals	Apps	Goals	Apps	Goals
Copenhagen	2017–18	Danish Superliga	8	0	0	0	2 (Note: Appearances in UEFA Europa League)	0	10	0
Copenhagen	2018–19	Danish Superliga	10	1	1	0	5	1	16	2
Copenhagen	2019–20	Danish Superliga	9	0	0	0	7 (Note: Four appearances in UEFA Champions League, three appearances in UEFA Europa League)	0	16	0
Copenhagen	Total		27	1	1	0	14	1	42	2
Esbjerg (loan)	2018–19	Danish Superliga	14	3	1	0	—		15	3
Rosenborg	2020	Eliteserien	30	5	0	0	4	1	34	6
Rosenborg	2021	Eliteserien	28	7	2	1	6 (Note: Appearances in UEFA Conference League)	1	36	9
Rosenborg	2022	Eliteserien	28	3	3	2	—		31	5
Rosenborg	2023	Eliteserien	16	3	1	0	4	1	21	4
Rosenborg	Total		102	18	6	3	14	3	122	24
Samsunspor	2023–24	Süper Lig	33	5	0	0	—		33	5
Samsunspor	2024–25	Süper Lig	34	7	0	0	—		34	7
Samsunspor	2025–26	Süper Lig	31	8	4	0	11 (Note: One appearance in UEFA Europa League, ten appearances and one goal in UEFA Conference League)	2	46	10
Samsunspor	Total		98	20	4	0	11	2	113	22
St. Louis City SC	2026	Major League Soccer	11	6	0	0	—		11	6
Career total			252	48	12	3	39	6	303	57

=== International ===
As of match played 10 June 2025

Appearances and goals by national team and year
National team	Year	Apps	Goals
Denmark	2025	1	0
Total		1	0

== Honours ==
Individual

- Eliteserien top assist provider: 2022
