= Dino Islamović =

Montenegrin footballer (born 1994)

Personal information
- Date of birth: 17 January 1994 (age 32)
- Place of birth: Ljusdal, Sweden
- Height: 1.90 m (6 ft 3 in)
- Position: Forward

Team information
- Current team: Rosenborg
- Number: 9

Youth career
- –2012: Malmö FF
- 2012–2014: Fulham

Senior career*
Years	Team	Apps	(Gls)
2014–2016	FC Groningen	11	(0)
2017	Trelleborgs FF	27	(8)
2018–2019	Östersunds FK	50	(16)
2020–2022	Rosenborg	48	(18)
2022–2023	Gangwon FC	13	(2)
2024	Kalmar	29	(12)
2025–	Rosenborg	40	(16)

International career^{‡}
2009–2010	Sweden U17	13	(3)
2011–2012	Sweden U19	6	(2)
2014–2015	Sweden U21	3	(1)
2020	Sweden	1	(0)
2020–2022	Montenegro	8	(0)
- * Club domestic league appearances and goals as of 24 October 2026 ‡ National team caps and goals as of 00:47, 17 January 2022 (UTC)

Dino Islamović (Serbian Cyrillic: Дино Исламовић; born 17 January 1994) is a professional footballer who plays as a forward for Rosenborg. Born in Sweden, he formerly represented Sweden internationally before switching to represent the Montenegro national team.

== Club career ==
Islamović started his career at Swedish side Malmö FF before spending two seasons with English side Fulham.

He joined Dutch Eredivisie side FC Groningen in June 2014 making his team debut at 17 July 2014 in a UEFA Europa League qualifying round fixture against Aberdeen when he replaced Nick van der Velden after 82 minutes in a goalless draw at the Pittodrie Stadium. At Groningen he won the KNVB Cup in the 2014–15 season after they beat PEC Zwolle 2–0 in the final.

He returned to Sweden after five years, when he joined Trelleborgs FF from FC Groningen in 2017, where he spent one season before joining Östersunds FK in January 2018. He scored on his debut against his former club in the Svenska Cupen on 9 February 2018.

Islamović played as a second-half substitute for Östersunds as they beat Arsenal in the 2nd leg of the Europa League last 32 at the Emirates Stadium with a 2–1 victory on 22 February 2018 after goals from Hosam Aiesh and Ken Sema. However they were knocked out on aggregate 4–2.

30 December 2019, Islamović signed for Rosenborg on a 3-year contract.

In February 2022, he joined Gangwon FC of South Korean K League 1.

After a spell with Kalmar FF, Islamović returned to Norwegian club Rosenborg BK in January 2025.

== International career ==
=== Sweden ===
Born in Sweden, Islamović is of Montenegrin and Bosnian descent. He has represented Sweden at international level up until Sweden U21's.

Islamović made his international debut for Sweden in a non-FIFA friendly match against Moldova on 9 January 2020.

=== Montenegro ===
On 5 March 2020, Islamović announced that he would switch international allegiances to the Montenegro national team. Six months later, on 5 September 2020, he made his international debut against Cyprus. That game finished in a 2–0 victory for Montenegro.

== Career statistics ==
=== Club ===
As of match played 28 October 2026

Appearances and goals by club, season and competition
Club	Season	League			National cup		Continental		Total	
Club	Season	Division	Apps	Goals	Apps	Goals	Apps	Goals	Apps	Goals
Groningen	2014–15	Eredivisie	11	0	3	1	1	0	15	1
Groningen	2015–16	Eredivisie	0	0	0	0	–		0	0
Groningen	Total		11	0	3	1	1	0	15	1
Trelleborg	2017	Superettan	27	8	4	1	–		31	9
Östersund	2018	Allsvenskan	22	9	5	2	1	0	28	11
Östersund	2019	Allsvenskan	28	7	4	3	–		32	10
Östersund	Total		50	16	9	5	1	0	60	21
Rosenborg	2020	Eliteserien	27	12	0	0	4	2	31	14
Rosenborg	2021	Eliteserien	21	6	2	5	5	4	28	15
Rosenborg	Total		48	18	2	5	9	6	59	29
Gangwon	2022	K League 1	5	2	0	0	–		5	2
Gangwon	2023	K League 1	8	0	0	0	–		8	0
Gangwon	Total		13	2	0	0	0	0	13	2
Kalmar	2024	Allsvenskan	29	12	4	1	–		33	13
Rosenborg	2025	Eliteserien	27	14	2	4	6	6	35	24
Rosenborg	2026	Eliteserien	13	2	2	0	–		15	2
Rosenborg	Total		40	16	4	4	6	6	50	26
Career total			218	72	26	17	17	12	261	101
