= Mikael Tørset Johnsen =

Norwegian footballer (born 2000)

Mikael Johnsen
Personal information
- Full name: Mikael Tørset Johnsen
- Date of birth: 4 July 2000 (age 26)
- Place of birth: Skien, Norway
- Height: 1.75 m (5 ft 9 in)
- Position: Midfielder

Team information
- Current team: Ranheim
- Number: 10

Youth career
- –2014: Tiller
- 2015–2019: Rosenborg

Senior career*
Years	Team	Apps	(Gls)
2019–2021	Rosenborg	2	(0)
2020–2021	→ Jong Feyenoord (loan)	3	(2)
2021	→ FC Dordrecht (loan)	0	(0)
2021	→ Jong Feyenoord (loan)	0	(0)
2021–2022	Jong Feyenoord	6	(1)
2022–2023	Venezia	0	(0)
2022	→ Oakland Roots (loan)	25	(1)
2023	Stjørdals-Blink	7	(0)
2024–	Ranheim	84	(30)

International career^{‡}
2019	Norway U-19	5	(0)
- * Club domestic league appearances and goals as of 8 November 2026 ‡ National team caps and goals as of 28 April 2019

Mikael Tørset Johnsen (born 4 July 2000) is a Norwegian footballer who plays as a midfielder for Ranheim.

== Career ==
Mikael Tørset Johnsen joined Rosenborg in 2015 from Tiller. After impressing during the pre-season matches, he became a regular in the matchday squad and made his debut for Rosenborg on 28 April 2019 in a league match against Molde, coming on as a substitute after 73 minutes. In May he signed a new two-year contract with the club, making him a permanent part of the first team squad.

On 28 August 2020, Johnsen joined Feyenoord U21 on loan for the first half of the season. The loan was later extended for the remainder of the 2020–2021 season. On 26 January 2021, Johnsen joined FC Dordrecht on loan for the rest of the season.

On 26 February 2022, Johnsen signed with Italian club Venezia throughout the 2023–24 season and was immediately loaned to Oakland Roots in the USL Championship until December 2022. Johnsen's contract with Venezia was terminated by mutual consent on 23 August 2023.

On 11 September 2023, Johnsen signed with Stjørdals-Blink in the Norwegian third tier.

== Personal life ==
He is the son of former footballer Tor Gunnar Johnsen and the younger brother of Dennis Tørset Johnsen.

== Career statistics ==
=== Club ===
As of match played 8 November 2026

Appearances and goals by club, season and competition
Club	Season	League			National Cup		Europe		Total	
Club	Season	Division	Apps	Goals	Apps	Goals	Apps	Goals	Apps	Goals
Rosenborg	2019	Eliteserien	2	0	3	0	1	0	6	0
Rosenborg	2020	Eliteserien	0	0	0	0	0	0	0	0
Rosenborg	Total		2	0	3	0	1	0	6	0
Venezia	2022–23	Serie B	0	0	0	0	0	0	0	0
Venezia	Total		0	0	0	0	0	0	0	0
Oakland Roots (loan)	2022	USL Championship	25	1	0	0	0	0	25	1
Oakland Roots (loan)	Total		25	1	0	0	0	0	25	1
Stjørdals-Blink	2023	PostNord-ligaen	7	0	0	0	0	0	7	0
Stjørdals-Blink	Total		7	0	0	0	0	0	7	0
Ranheim	2024	OBOS-ligaen	25	2	3	2	0	0	28	4
Ranheim	2025	OBOS-ligaen	29	8	4	1	0	0	33	9
Ranheim	2026	OBOS-ligaen	30	20	2	0	0	0	32	20
Ranheim	Total		84	30	9	3	0	0	93	33
Career total			118	31	12	3	1	0	131	34

== Honours ==
=== Club ===
Rosenborg

- Norwegian U-19 Championship (1): 2019
- Norwegian U-16 Championship (1): 2016
