= Edvard Tagseth =

Norwegian footballer (born 2001)

- Tagseth with Nashville SC in 2026

Personal information
- Full name: Edvard Sandvik Tagseth
- Date of birth: 23 January 2001 (age 25)
- Place of birth: Frosta Municipality, Norway
- Height: 1.71 m (5 ft 7 in)
- Position: Midfielder

Team information
- Current team: Nashville SC
- Number: 20

Youth career
- –2017: Neset
- 2017–2019: Liverpool

Senior career*
Years	Team	Apps	(Gls)
2016	Neset	4	(3)
2017–2019	Liverpool	0	(0)
2019–2024	Rosenborg	118	(8)
2025–	Nashville SC	64	(1)

International career^{‡}
2016	Norway U15	8	(4)
2017	Norway U16	11	(2)
2017	Norway U17	3	(0)
2018–2019	Norway U18	15	(3)
2019	Norway U19	6	(0)
2021	Norway U20	2	(0)
- * Club domestic league appearances and goals as of 7 November 2026 ‡ National team caps and goals as of 13 February 2024

Edvard Sandvik Tagseth (born 23 January 2001) is a Norwegian professional footballer who plays as a midfielder for Major League Soccer club Nashville SC.

== Career ==
=== Liverpool ===
Edvard Tagseth first caught the attention of the public when he played Norway Cup in 2014 for his hometown team Neset. He later signed a deal with Liverpool as a 14 year old. The first year he trained one week with the Academy every month while the second year he trained two weeks every month. When he turned 16 years old he became a full-time part of the Liverpool F.C. Reserves and Academy. He stayed there until the summer of 2019, when he chose not to renew his contract with the Academy.

=== Rosenborg ===
Tagseth then later joined Rosenborg in August 2019. He made his first-team debut on 3 October when he came on as a substitute in Rosenborg's Europa League match against PSV Eindhoven. Three days later he got his first start in a league match against Haugesund.

=== Nashville SC ===
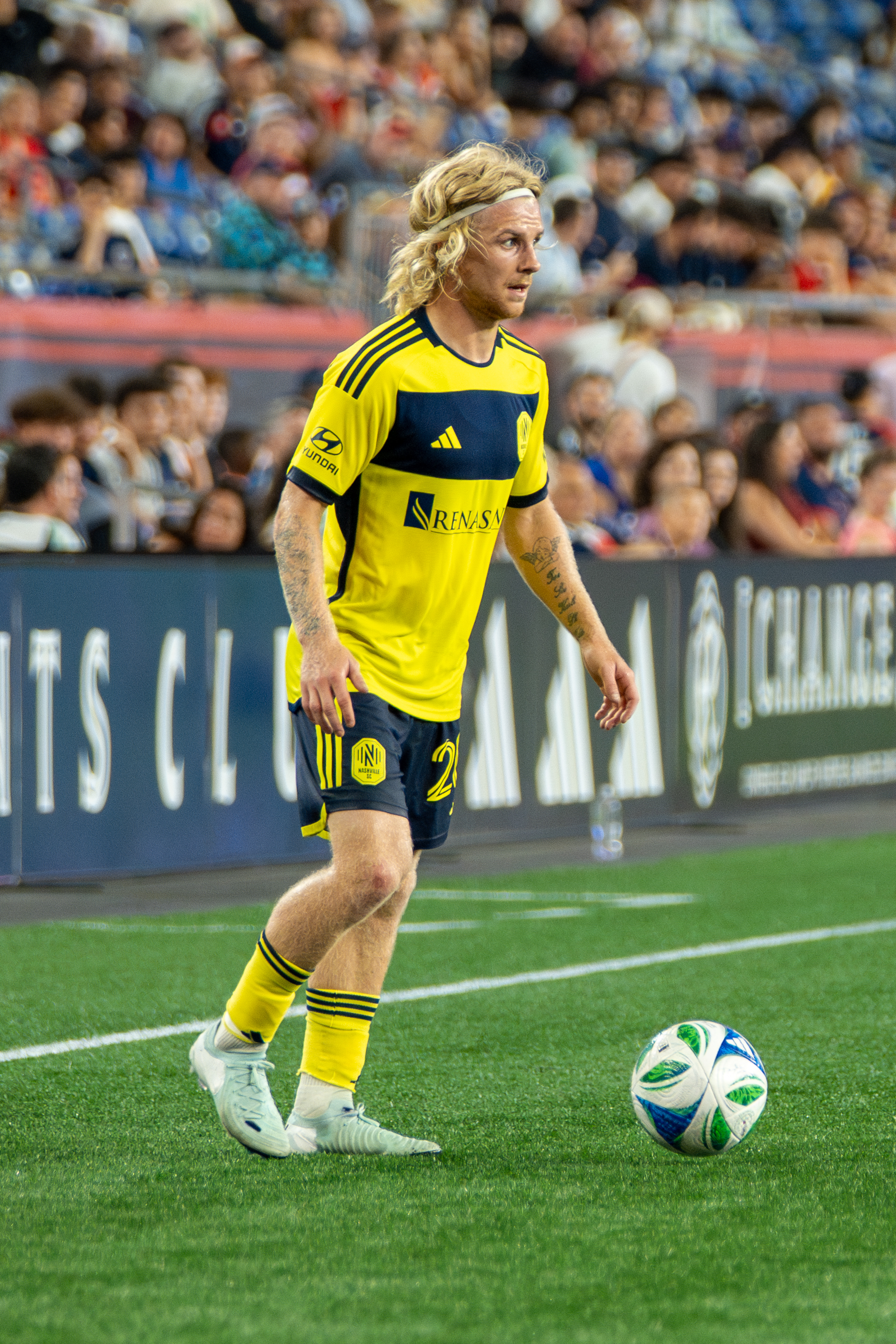
Tagseth with Nashville SC in 2025

On 19 November 2024, MLS club Nashville SC announced that Tagseth would join the club in January 2025.

== Career statistics ==
=== Club ===
As of 7 November 2026

Appearances and goals by club, season and competition
Club	Season	League			National Cup		Europe		Total	
Club	Season	Division	Apps	Goals	Apps	Goals	Apps	Goals	Apps	Goals
Neset	2016	4. divisjon	4	3	1	1	—		5	4
Neset	Total		4	3	1	1	0	0	5	4
Rosenborg	2019	Eliteserien	1	0	0	0	2 (Note: Appearances in the UEFA Europa League)	0	3	0
Rosenborg	2020	Eliteserien	26	1	—		2	0	28	1
Rosenborg	2021	Eliteserien	21	1	3	0	5 (Note: Appearances in the UEFA Europa Conference League)	0	29	1
Rosenborg	2022	Eliteserien	27	1	2	0	—		29	1
Rosenborg	2023	Eliteserien	18	0	3	0	2	0	23	0
Rosenborg	2024	Eliteserien	25	5	3	2	—		28	7
Rosenborg	Total		118	8	11	2	11	0	140	10
Nashville SC	2025	MLS	36	0	3	0	—		39	0
Nashville SC	2026	MLS	28	1	2	0	5 (Note: Appearances in the CONCACAF Champions Cup)	0	35	1
Nashville SC	Total		64	1	5	0	5	0	74	1
Career total			186	12	17	3	16	0	219	15
