= Emil Konradsen Ceïde =

Norwegian footballer (born 2001)

Emil Ceïde
- Ceide with Rosenborg in 2018

Personal information
- Full name: Emil Konradsen Ceïde
- Date of birth: 3 September 2001 (age 25)
- Place of birth: Finnsnes, Norway
- Height: 1.75 m (5 ft 9 in)
- Position: Winger

Team information
- Current team: Rosenborg
- Number: 35

Youth career
- –2017: Finnsnes
- 2017–2018: Rosenborg

Senior career*
Years	Team	Apps	(Gls)
2017	Finnsnes	1	(0)
2018–2022	Rosenborg	63	(5)
2022	→ Sassuolo (loan)	6	(0)
2022–2025	Sassuolo	30	(0)
2024–2025	→ Rosenborg (loan)	22	(3)
2025–	Rosenborg	45	(9)

International career^{‡}
2018	Norway U17	5	(0)
2019	Norway U18	12	(2)
2019	Norway U19	2	(1)
2021–2023	Norway U21	14	(5)
- * Club domestic league appearances and goals as of 22 November 2026 ‡ National team caps and goals as of 28 June 2023

Emil Konradsen Ceïde (born 3 September 2001) is a Norwegian professional footballer who plays as a winger for Eliteserien club Rosenborg.

== Club career ==
Konradsen Ceïde signed for Rosenborg from Finnsnes in May 2017.

On 20 April 2018, he made his debut for Rosenborg coming on against Trygg/Lade in a Cup game which Rosenborg won 4–2. A week later he came on as a substitute against Lillestrøm in the 2018 Mesterfinalen and helped secure a 1–0 victory. He made his league debut 7 July the same year, coming on in the 84th minute against Tromsø in a 2–1 home win. In May 2019, he signed a new contract with Rosenborg until the end of 2021, making him an official member of the first team squad. In August 2019 he started only his second match for Rosenborg, contributing big in a 5–2 win over Tromsø by providing two assists.

On 21 January 2022, he joined Italian Serie A club Sassuolo on loan with an obligation to buy after the season.

On 16 August 2024, Emil returned to Rosenborg on a year-long loan with an option to buy.

== Personal life ==
Emil's father is Haitian while his mother is Norwegian. He has a twin brother named Mikkel who is also at Rosenborg. They are second cousins with former Norway international player Anders Konradsen and FK Haugesund player Morten Konradsen.

== Career statistics ==
=== Club ===
As of match played 22 November 2026

Appearances and goals by club, season and competition
Club	Season	League			National cup		Europe		Other		Total	
Club	Season	Division	Apps	Goals	Apps	Goals	Apps	Goals	Apps	Goals	Apps	Goals
Finnsnes	2017	2. divisjon	1	0	1	0	—		—		2	0
Rosenborg	2018	Eliteserien	2	0	1	0	—		1 (Note: Appearance in Mesterfinalen)	0	4	0
Rosenborg	2019	Eliteserien	9	0	2	0	5	0	—		16	0
Rosenborg	2020	Eliteserien	28	0	0	0	1	0	—		29	0
Rosenborg	2021	Eliteserien	24	5	3	3	6	2	—		33	10
Rosenborg	Total		63	5	6	3	12	2	1	0	82	10
Sassuolo (loan)	2021–22	Serie A	6	0	1	0	0	0	0	0	7	0
Sassuolo	2022–23	Serie A	19	0	1	0	—		—		20	0
Sassuolo	2023–24	Serie A	11	0	3	1	—		—		14	1
Sassuolo	Total		36	0	5	1	—		—		41	1
Rosenborg (loan)	2024	Eliteserien	12	1	0	0	—		—		12	1
Rosenborg	2025	Eliteserien	28	5	3	0	6	0	—		37	5
Rosenborg	2026	Eliteserien	27	6	4	5	—		—		31	11
Rosenborg	Total		67	12	7	5	6	0	—		80	17
Career total			166	17	19	9	18	2	1	0	205	28

== Honours ==
Rosenborg

- Norwegian Football Cup: 2018
- Mesterfinalen: 2018

Rosenborg U19

- Norwegian U-19 Championship: 2019
