= Rohit Saggi =

Norwegian football referee

- Full name: Rohit Saggi
- Born: 31 January 1992 (age 34); Drammen, Norway

Rohit Saggi (born 31 January 1992) is a Norwegian football referee, who officiates in the Eliteserien and has been a FIFA international referee since 2018.

== Refereering career ==
He initially officiated in the youth categories in Norway leagues, and later in the lower divisions. He made his top-flight debut in the league of Norwegian Eliteserien in the 2016 season.

In 2023, he was promoted to UEFA's first category of referees. He has also been appointed to international competitions, and Champions League games. In October 2026, he officiated the UEFA Champions League game between Inter Milan and Club Brugge.

On 13 November 2026, at the UEFA Nations League, he officiated the game between The Netherlands and Greece, held in Amsterdam.
