= Sondre Skogen =

Norwegian footballer (born 2000)

Personal information
- Date of birth: 13 August 2000 (age 26)
- Place of birth: Lierne Municipality, Norway
- Height: 1.84 m (6 ft 0 in)
- Position: Defender

Team information
- Current team: SKN St. Pölten
- Number: 15

Youth career
- –2015: Lierne
- 2015: Steinkjer
- 2016–2020: Rosenborg

Senior career*
| Years | Team | Apps | (Gls) |
| 2020 | Rosenborg II | 10 | (4) |
| 2020 | Rosenborg | 0 | (0) |
| 2020 | → Jong Feyenoord (loan) | 1 | (0) |
| 2021–2022 | Jong Feyenoord | 0 | (0) |
| 2021 | → Excelsior (loan) | 7 | (1) |
| 2022–2024 | Mjøndalen IF | 48 | (2) |
| 2024– | SKN St. Pölten | 54 | (3) |

International career^{‡}
| 2016 | Norway U16 | 4 | (0) |
- * Club domestic league appearances and goals as of 17 May 2026 ‡ National team caps and goals as of 9 April 2021

Sondre Skogen (born 13 August 2000) is a Norwegian professional footballer who plays as a defender for Austrian club SKN St. Pölten. He also represented Norway as a youth international.

== Club career ==
Hailing from Lierne Municipality, he played youth football for Lierne, Steinkjer FK and Rosenborg BK, joining the latter in 2016.

Without making his senior league debut for Rosenborg, he was assigned squad number 39 and was benched several times before being loaned out to Jong Feyenoord in the fall of 2020. Their coach Rini Coolen had previously been academy manager and manager in Rosenborg. Skogen featured in one game before the season was cancelled. In the winter of 2021 the move was made permanent. He was sent on loan to feeder club Excelsior, and made his debut in the Eerste Divisie in March 2021 against Helmond Sport. Skogen featured seven times for Excelsior, scoring once, before returning to Feyenoord. In August 2022 Skogen left Feyenoord and returned to his homeland, joining Mjøndalen IF on a two-year deal.

On 10 July 2024, Skogen signed a two-season contract with SKN St. Pölten in Austria.

== International career ==
Skogen was a youth international for Norway, featuring four times in 2016.
