= Gustav Valsvik =

Norwegian footballer (born 1993)

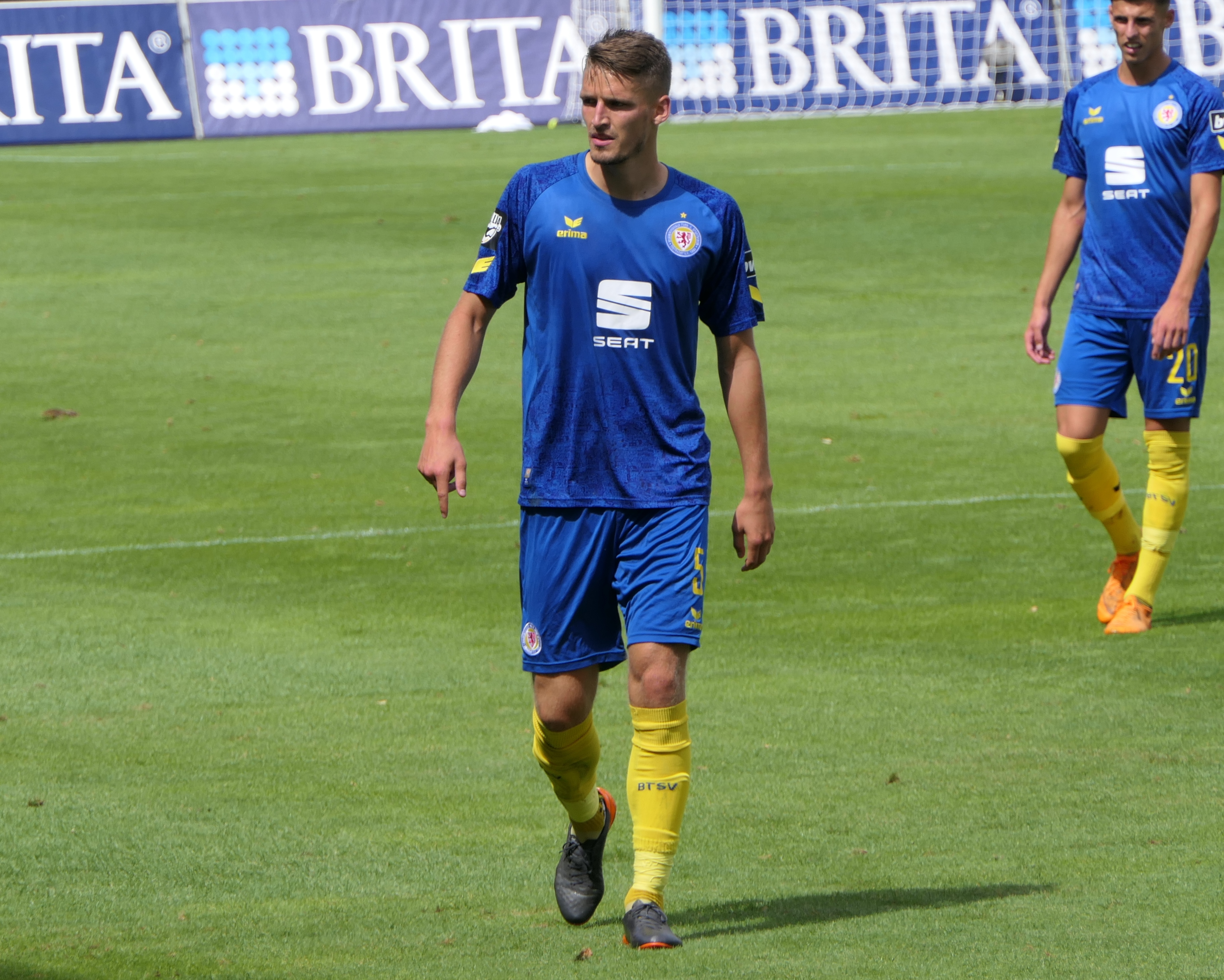
- Gustav Valsvik in 2018.

Personal information
- Full name: Gustav Valsvik
- Date of birth: 26 May 1993 (age 33)
- Place of birth: Vik, Norway
- Height: 1.95 m (6 ft 5 in)
- Position: Defender

Team information
- Current team: Strømsgodset
- Number: 71

Senior career*
Years	Team	Apps	(Gls)
–2009	Vik		
2010–2014	Sogndal	83	(5)
2014–2016	Strømsgodset	59	(1)
2016–2019	Eintracht Braunschweig	74	(1)
2019–2021	Rosenborg	24	(2)
2020	→ Stabæk (loan)	10	(1)
2021–	Strømsgodset	178	(17)

International career^{‡}
2009	Norway U19	12	(1)
2012	Norway U20	1	(0)
2012–2014	Norway U21	12	(1)
2017	Norway	6	(0)
- * Club domestic league appearances and goals as of 14 November 2026 ‡ National team caps and goals as of 12 November 2017

Gustav Valsvik (born 26 May 1993) is a Norwegian footballer who plays as a defender who plays for Strømsgodset.

== Career ==
Born in Vik, Valsvik started his career in the local club Vik IL before he joined Sogndal ahead of the 2010 season. In his first season, Valsvik played nine matches in the First Division. Following Sogndal's promotion, Valsvik played seven matches in Tippeligaen in 2011, and the next season he was playing regularly in Sogndal's central defence.

He signed a three-year contract with Strømsgodset in July 2014, for an undisclosed sum.

In July 2016, Valsvik transferred to German 2. Bundesliga club Eintracht Braunschweig. On 18 January 2019, Valsvik transferred to Rosenborg on a four years contract.

== International career ==
Valsvik first represented Norway when he played for the under-16 team in 2009. He has later represented Norway at every level up to under-21 level. On 26 March 2017, Valsvik made his debut for the senior Norway national football team.

== Career statistics ==
As of match played 14 November 2026

Club	Season	Division	League		Cup		Europe		Total	
Club	Season	Division	Apps	Goals	Apps	Goals	Apps	Goals	Apps	Goals
Sogndal	2010	Adeccoligaen	9	0	3	1	—		12	1
Sogndal	2011	Tippeligaen	7	0	1	0	—		8	0
Sogndal	2012	Tippeligaen	27	2	1	0	—		28	2
Sogndal	2013	Tippeligaen	30	2	0	0	—		30	2
Sogndal	2014	Tippeligaen	10	1	3	0	—		13	1
Sogndal	Total		83	5	8	1	—		91	6
Strømsgodset	2014	Tippeligaen	13	0	0	0	0	0	13	0
Strømsgodset	2015	Tippeligaen	29	0	2	0	5	0	36	0
Strømsgodset	2016	Tippeligaen	17	1	4	0	2	0	23	1
Strømsgodset	Total		59	1	6	0	7	0	72	1
Eintracht Braunschweig	2016–17	2. Bundesliga	29	0	1	0	—		30	0
Eintracht Braunschweig	2017–18	2. Bundesliga	34	1	1	0	—		35	1
Eintracht Braunschweig	2018–19	3. Liga	11	0	1	0	—		12	0
Eintracht Braunschweig	Total		74	1	3	0	—		77	1
Rosenborg	2019	Eliteserien	13	1	4	1	3	0	20	2
Rosenborg	2020	Eliteserien	11	1	0	0	1	0	12	1
Rosenborg	Total		24	2	4	1	4	0	32	3
Stabæk (loan)	2020	Eliteserien	10	1	0	0	—		10	1
Stabæk (loan)	Total		10	1	0	0	—		10	1
Strømsgodset	2021	Eliteserien	29	3	3	1	—		32	4
Strømsgodset	2022	Eliteserien	30	3	4	0	—		34	3
Strømsgodset	2023	Eliteserien	30	5	4	0	—		34	5
Strømsgodset	2024	Eliteserien	30	2	4	0	—		34	2
Strømsgodset	2025	Eliteserien	29	2	3	1	—		32	3
Strømsgodset	2026	OBOS-ligaen	30	2	2	0	—		32	2
Strømsgodset	Total		178	17	18	2	—		196	19
Career total			428	27	41	4	11	0	480	31
