= Norwegian Under-16 Football Championship =

- Founded: 2009; 17 years ago
- Region: Norway
- Current champions: Brann (2nd title)
- Most championships: Rosenborg (6 titles)

The Norwegian Under-16 Football Championship (Norwegian: Norgesmesterskapet i fotball for gutter 16 år) is an annual football knockout tournament involving Norwegian boys teams, with a maximum age of 16, that was first arranged in 2009.

== List of finals ==
Season	Winners	Runner-up	Score
2009	Viking	Vålerenga	2–0
2010	Brann	Stabæk	4–0
2011	Rosenborg	Mjølner	1–0
2012	Vålerenga	Vard Haugesund	3–1
2013	Rosenborg	Stabæk	3–2 (a.e.t.)
2014	Rosenborg	Mjøndalen	5–0
2015	Lillestrøm	Brann	4–1
2016	Rosenborg	Start	2–0
2017	Stabæk	Viking	5–2
2018	Stabæk	Rosenborg	3–0
2019	Vålerenga	Viking	2–1
2020	Cancelled		
2021	Viking	Sarpsborg 08	4–0
2022	Rosenborg	Strømsgodset	4–2
2023	Rosenborg	Brann	2–1
2024	Stabæk	Hasle-Løren	4–2
2025	Brann	Rosenborg	2–2 (5-3 pens)

== Performance by club ==
Club	Winners	Runners-up	Winning years
Rosenborg	6	2	2011, 2013, 2014, 2016, 2022, 2023
Stabæk	3	2	2017, 2018, 2024
Brann	2	2	2010, 2025
Viking	2	2	2009, 2021
Vålerenga	2	1	2012, 2019
Lillestrøm	1	0	2015
Hasle-Løren	0	1	
Mjølner	0	1	
Mjøndalen	0	1	
Sarpsborg 08	0	1	
Start	0	1	
Strømsgodset	0	1	
Vard Haugesund	0	1	
