= Norwegian Youth Cup =

Football knockout tournament

- Founded: 1953; 73 years ago
- Region: Norway
- Current champions: Viking (5th title)
- Most championships: Molde (10 titles)

The Norwegian Youth Cup (Norwegian: Norgesmesterskapet i fotball for gutter 19 år) is an annual football knockout tournament involving Norwegian youth teams, with a maximum age of 19, that was first arranged in 1953.

== List of finals ==
| Season | Winners | Runners-up | Score |
|---|---|---|---|
| 1953 | Skeid | Vito | 6–2 |
| 1954 | Brann | Vålerengen | 3–2 |
| 1955 | Fredrikstad | Østsiden | 3–0 |
| 1956 | Fredrikstad | Brann | 2–0 |
| 1957 | Fredrikstad | Odd | 2–1 |
| 1958 | Brann | Sagene | 5–1 |
| 1959 | Brann | Skeid | 2–0 |
| 1960 | Fredrikstad | Drafn | 0–0 (a.e.t.), 2–1 |
| 1961 | Sandefjord BK | Lyn | 1–1 (a.e.t.), 2–1 |
| 1962 | Skeid | Frigg | 5–1 |
| 1963 | Fremad Lillehammer | Lyn | 2–0 |
| 1964 | Aalesund | Fredrikstad | 1–0 |
| 1965 | Viking | Fredrikstad | 2–1 |
| 1966 | Lillestrøm | Store Bergan | 3–1 |
| 1967 | Vålerengen | Manglerud Star | 4–4 (a.e.t.), 3–1 |
| 1968 | Vålerengen | Lyn | 2–0 |
| 1969 | Skeid | Viking | 1–0 |
| 1970 | Brumunddal | Viking | 2–1 (a.e.t.) |
| 1971 | Strømmen | Frigg | 3–0 |
| 1972 | Vard | Rosenborg | 2–1 |
| 1973 | Pors | Brann | 0–0 (a.e.t.), 1–1 (a.e.t.), 0–0 (a.e.t.), 1–1 (a.e.t.), 2–1 (a.e.t.) |
| 1974 | Start | Brann | 2–0 |
| 1975 | Brann | Oppsal | 2–0 |
| 1976 | Fredrikstad | Stjørdals-Blink | 0–0 (a.e.t.), 0–0 (a.e.t.), 2–1 (a.e.t.) |
| 1977 | Mjøndalen | Stjørdals-Blink | 3–1 |
| 1978 | Molde | Mjøndalen | 2–1 |
| 1979 | Viking | Sunndal | 2–1 |
| 1980 | Brann | Pors | 2–0 |
| 1981 | Lillestrøm | Viking | 2–2 (a.e.t.), 4–2 |
| 1982 | Rosenborg | Start | 1–1 (a.e.t.), 1–1 (a.e.t.), 1–0 |
| 1983 | Moss | Mosjøen | 3–2 |
| 1984 | Moss | Sunndal | 3–0 |
| 1985 | Odd | Tromsdalen | 4–3 |
| 1986 | Lillestrøm | Bodø/Glimt | 3–0 |
| 1987 | Molde | Haugar | 2–0 |
| 1988 | Ørn | Lillestrøm | 2–1 |
| 1989 | Brann | Start | 2–0 |
| 1990 | Lyn | Moss | 2–2 (a.e.t.), 3–0 on penalties |
| 1991 | Aalesund | Start | 3–0 |
| 1992 | Molde | Viking | 2–1 |
| 1993 | Start | Molde | 1–0 (a.e.t.) |
| 1994 | Lyn | Rosenborg | 1–0 |
| 1995 | Viking | Strømmen | 2–1 |
| 1996 | Molde | Viking | 1–0 |
| 1997 | Molde | Nardo | 3–2 |
| 1998 | Skeid | Viking | 4–0 |
| 1999 | Skeid | Stabæk | 3–2 |
| 2000 | Molde | Moss | 4–2 |
| 2001 | Lyn | Stabæk | 3–1 |
| 2002 | Brann | Bodø/Glimt | 3–2 |
| 2003 | Viking | Tromsø | 8–0 |
| 2004 | Odd Grenland | Tromsø | 2–0 |
| 2005 | Rosenborg | Lyn | 4–0 |
| 2006 | Start | Rosenborg | 4–2 |
| 2007 | Start | Vålerenga | 2–1 |
| 2008 | Stabæk | Viking | 4–3 |
| 2009 | Rosenborg | Stabæk | 3–1 |
| 2010 | Tromsø | Odd Grenland | 3–1 |
| 2011 | Rosenborg | Brann | 2–1 |
| 2012 | Rosenborg | Brann | 2–2 (a.e.t.), 3–1 on penalties |
| 2013 | Fyllingsdalen | Rosenborg | 3–2 |
| 2014 | Brann | Lillestrøm | 3–2 |
| 2015 | Rosenborg | Strømsgodset | 6–0 |
| 2016 | Molde | Vålerenga | 2–2 (a.e.t.), 6–5 on penalties |
| 2017 | Molde | Rosenborg | 2–2 (a.e.t.), 5–4 on penalties |
| 2018 | Sogndal | Rosenborg | 3–1 (a.e.t.) |
| 2019 | Rosenborg | Odd | 3–0 |
| 2020 | Cancelled | | |
| 2021 | Molde | Tromsø | 1–0 |
| 2022 | Molde | Sandnes Ulf | 2–1 |
| 2023 | Strømsgodset | Rosenborg | 4–3 (a.e.t.) |
| 2024 | Brann | Viking | 1–1 (a.e.t.), 5–4 on penalties |
| 2025 | Stabæk | Odd | 3–2 |
| 2026 | Viking | Rosenborg | 1-0 |

== Performance by club ==
| Club | Winners | Runners-up | Winning years |
|---|---|---|---|
| Molde | 10 | 1 | 1978, 1987, 1992, 1996, 1997, 2000, 2016, 2017, 2021, 2022 |
| Brann | 9 | 5 | 1954, 1958, 1959, 1975, 1980, 1989, 2002, 2014, 2024 |
| Rosenborg | 7 | 8 | 1982, 2005, 2009, 2011, 2012, 2015, 2019 |
| Viking | 5 | 8 | 1965, 1979, 1995, 2003, 2026 |
| Fredrikstad | 5 | 2 | 1955, 1956, 1957, 1960, 1976 |
| Skeid | 5 | 1 | 1953, 1962, 1969, 1998, 1999 |
| Start | 4 | 3 | 1974, 1993, 2006, 2007 |
| Lyn | 3 | 4 | 1990, 1994, 2001 |
| Lillestrøm | 3 | 2 | 1966, 1981, 1986 |
| Odd | 2 | 4 | 1985, 2004 |
| Vålerenga | 2 | 3 | 1967, 1968 |
| Moss | 2 | 2 | 1983, 1984 |
| Aalesund | 2 | | 1964, 1991 |
| Stabæk | 2 | 3 | 2008, 2025 |
| Tromsø | 1 | 3 | 2010 |
| Mjøndalen | 1 | 1 | 1977 |
| Pors Grenland | 1 | 1 | 1973 |
| Strømmen | 1 | 1 | 1971 |
| Strømsgodset | 1 | 1 | 2023 |
| Brumunddal | 1 | | 1970 |
| Fremad Lillehammer | 1 | | 1963 |
| Fyllingsdalen | 1 | | 2013 |
| Sandefjord BK | 1 | | 1961 |
| Sogndal | 1 | | 2018 |
| Vard Haugesund | 1 | | 1972 |
| Ørn-Horten | 1 | | 1988 |
| Bodø/Glimt | | 2 | |
| Frigg Oslo | | 2 | |
| Stjørdals-Blink | | 2 | |
| Sunndal | | 2 | |
| Drafn | | 1 | |
| Haugar | | 1 | |
| Manglerud Star | | 1 | |
| Mosjøen | | 1 | |
| Nardo | | 1 | |
| Oppsal | | 1 | |
| Sagene | | 1 | |
| Sandnes Ulf | | 1 | |
| Store Bergan | | 1 | |
| Tromsdalen | | 1 | |
| Vito | | 1 | |
| Østsiden | | 1 | |
