= Football at the 2023 Island Games =

Tournament details
- Host country: Guernsey
- Dates: 9 – 14 July
- Teams: Men's 16; Women's 10
- Venue: 6

Final positions
- Champions: Jersey (men); Bermuda (women)
- Runners-up: (Anglesey) Ynys Môn (men) (Outer Hebrides) Western Isles (women)
- Third place: Isle of Wight (men); Isle of Man (women)
- Fourth place: Bermuda (men); Menorca (women)

The 2023 Island Games in Guernsey is the sixteenth edition in which an association football tournament was played at the multi-games competition and the tenth Women's tournament.

== Venues ==
- College Field
- The Corbet Field
- Northfield
- Blanche Pierre Lane
- The Track

The men's final was held at Footes Lane

== Participants ==
Nineteen teams applied for the Men's competition, however time constraints limited the number of teams to sixteen, with a draw to eliminate three teams. Western Isles, Hitra and Alderney become reserve teams. On 30 January 2023, the groups were drawn for the men's competition, with Saaremaa withdrawing, and first reserve side, Western Isles taking the available slot.

Men's

- Åland
- Bermuda
- Falkland Islands
- Frøya
- Gozo
- Greenland
- Guernsey
- Isle of Man
- Isle of Wight
- Jersey
- Menorca
- Orkney
- Shetland
- Saint Helena
- Western Isles
- Ynys Môn

Women's

- Åland
- Bermuda
- Guernsey
- Hitra Municipality
- Isle of Man
- Isle of Wight
- Jersey
- Menorca
- Western Isles
- Ynys Môn

== Medalists ==
Event	Gold	Silver	Bronze
Men's tournament	Jersey; Lorne Bickley; Luke Campbell; James Carr; Miguel Carvalho; Harry Curtis; Jay Giles; Karl Hinds; Joe Kilshaw; Jonny Le Quesne; Francis Lekimimati; Paul McCafferty; James Queree; Toby Ritzema; Pierce Roche; Sol Solomon; Adam Trotter; Euan van der Vliet; Luke Watson	Ynys Môn; Jack Abbott-Walsh; Kaine Bentley; Tomos Clark; Dion Evans; Sam Gregson; David Jones; Osian Jones; Sam Jones; Daniel McGinness; Melvin McGinness; Liam Morris; Cian Owen; Gari Owen; Cai Powell-Roberts; Matt Reynolds; Gerwyn Roberts; Huw Shaw; Jack Smith; Sol Williams	Isle of Wight; Adam Biss; Jordan Browne; Joe Butcher; George Colson; Joseph Craig; Joe Hancott; Ed Hatt; Ryan Hughes; Connor Kelly; Nathan Lewis; John Mckie; Jimmy Mumford; Ryan Oatley; Finley Phillips; Leon Pitman; Jake Scrimshaw; Liam Triggs; Josh Wakefield; Oliver West; Josh Younie
Women's tournament	Bermuda; Khyla Brangman; Emily Cabral; Deshae Darrell; Samantha Davies; Victoria Davis; Keunna Dill; Trinae Edwards; Sierra Fisher; Eva Frazzoni; Taznae Fubler; Akeyla Furbert; Koa Goodchild; Symira Lowe-Darrell; LeiLanni Nesbeth; Jya Ratteray-Smith; Jahdé Simmons; Za'Khari Turner; Ashley Tutas; Danni Watson; Zemira Webb	Western Isles; Abbie Campbell; Christie MacKenzie; Kayleigh Mackenzie; Kyla MacKinnon; Kirsty Maclean; Beth Macleod; Hannah Macleod; Jessica Macleod; Sinead Macleod; Beth Macphail; Shana Macphail; Kyla McMurdo; Amanda Nicolson; Chloe Nicolson; Catriona O'Carroll; Eleanor Smith; Anne-Louise Stewart; Maimie Zimmerman	Isle of Man; Elizabeth Cain; Rebecca Cole; Becky Corkish; Lisa Costain; Rishona Dykes; Eleanor Gawne; Kayleigh Georgeson; Louise Gibbins; Kayleigh Greggor; Megan Kelly; Tia Lisy; Stevie Mallon; Ruby Palmer; Erin Sells; Anna Shaw; Holly Stephen; Holly Sumner; Chloe Teare
