= Football at the 2017 Island Games =

Tournament details
- Host country: Gotland, Sweden
- Dates: June 24 – 30
- Teams: Men's 16; Women's 11
- Venue: 9

Tournament statistics
- Matches played: Men's 34; Women's 22

The 2017 Island Games in Gotland is the fifteenth edition in which an association football tournament was played at the multi-games competition and the ninth Women's tournament.

== Events ==
=== Medal table ===
Rank	Nation	Gold	Silver	Bronze	Total
1	Isle of Man (IOM)	1	1	0	2
2	Gotland (Gotland)	1	0	0	1
3	Greenland (GRL)	0	1	0	1
4	Guernsey (GGY)	0	0	1	1
4	Jersey (JEY)	0	0	1	1
Totals (5 entries)		2	2	2	6

=== Medal summary ===
Event	Gold	Silver	Bronze
Men	Isle of Man; Daniel Bell; Sam Caine; Christopher Cannell; Karl Clark; Liam Cowin; Sean Doyle; Alexander Harrison; Alexander Holden; Samuel Holliday; Nicholas Hurt; Samuel Ingham; Frank Jones; Ciaran Mcnulty; Jack Mcvey; Callum Morrissey; Rhys Oates; Daymon Petkov; Stephen Riding; Daniel Simpson; Matthew Woods	Greenland; Malik Berthelsen; Aputsiaq Evald Birch; Johan Bistrup; Steffen Boller; John Ludvig Broberg; Lars Peter Broberg; Mika Davidsen; Patrick Frederiksen; Anders H. Petersen; Malik Juuhl; Ari Claus Jean Lehnfelt Hermann; Kaali Lund Mathæussen; Norsaq Lund Mathæussen; Lars Pavia Fritsen; Nikki Petersen; Nick Reimer; Amos Rosbach; Loke Svane; Niels Svane; Nukannguaq Zeeb	Guernsey; Ross Allen; Ryan-Zico Black; Thomas Dodds; Jacob Fallaize; Charlton Gauvain; Simon Geall; Daniel Hale; Jordan Kelly; Robbie Legg; Matthew Loaring; Angus Mackay; Keanu Marsh; River Marsh; Tyler Mckane; Rory Moriarty; Paris Pereira; Leroi Riley; Sebbastian Skillen; Joshua Steel; Harry Tobin
Women	Gotland; Sissela Andersson; Jonna Appelgren; Ellen Bäckström; Nina Didriksson; Maja Elofsson; Ellinor Ericsson; Frida Erlandsson; Hilda Gustafsson; Marie Höglund; Elin Larsson; Ejla Lillro; Pauline Mårtensson; Hilda Nygren; Ellen Olofsson; Ebba Ronqvist; Amanda Ronström; Louise Ruthström; Ellen Sandström; Frida Starkenberg; Elfrida Svedjer	Isle of Man; Melissa Bell; Kira Buchan; Jade Burden; Rebecca Corkish; Lisa Costain; Anna Dillon; Eleanor Gawne; Kayleigh Greggor; Shannon Groves; Casey Halsall; Kym Micklin; Alexandra Honour; Emily Jones; Sarah O'Reilly; Holly Summer; Chloe Teare; Olivia Toombs; Sarah Wignall	Jersey; Marta Ascensao; Liberty Barnett; Michelle Bichard; Jodie Botterill; Sophie Botterill; Ella Bernnand; Rose Corbett; Lara Couvert; Paula Dos Santos Alves; Ciara Giles; Kelly Hughes; Natasha Keen; Leanne Le Feuvre; Sara Luce; Fiona Mackinnon; Holly Muirhead; Lauren Quemard; Sylvia Spinola; Eve Amelia Watson; Megan Wood

== Participants ==
Men's

- Åland
- Alderney
- Falkland Islands
- Frøya
- Gotland
- Greenland
- Guernsey
- Hitra Municipality
- Isle of Man
- Jersey
- Menorca
- Orkney
- Saare County
- Shetland
- Western Isles
- Ynys Môn

Women's

- Åland
- Gibraltar
- Gotland
- Greenland
- Hitra Municipality
- Isle of Man
- Isle of Wight
- Jersey
- Menorca
- Western Isles
- Ynys Môn

== Venues ==
- Gutavallen, Visby
- Hemse
- Fårösund
- Fardhem
- Säve, Visby
- Dalhem
- Stenkyrka
- Väskinde
- Visborgsvallen, Visby
