= Football at the 2015 Island Games – Women's tournament =

Women's Football at the Island Games 2015
Tournament details
- Host country: Jersey
- Dates: 27 June – 3 July 2015
- Teams: 11

Final positions
- Champions: Jersey (1st title)
- Runners-up: Åland
- Third place: Gotland
- Fourth place: Isle of Man

The women's football tournament was contested as part of the programme for the 2015 Island Games which was hosted in Jersey from 27 June to 3 July 2015. It was the fourteenth edition of the women's football tournament at the multi-sport event organised by the International Island Games Association.

The football tournament began with the first matches in the group stage on 27 June 2015 and ended with the gold medal match on 3 July 2015. Host Jersey and three-time champion Åland contested the final. Jersey would win the final 0–1, earning their first win in the tournament. In the bronze medal match, Gotland defeated Isle of Man 0–2.

== Background ==
A five-a-side youth football tournament was held at the inaugural games in 1985 held in Douglas, Isle of Man but football was completely absent from the programme at the 1987 Island Games held in Guernsey. The first women's football tournament was held at the 2001 Island Games in the Isle of Man. The Faroe Islands won the first three editions undefeated but have not competed since their win at the 2005 Island Games in Shetland. Åland won the tournament three Island Games in a row until Bermuda won their first title at the 2013 Island Games held in Bermuda. They would not appear at these Games for the women's tournament.

== Format ==
Eleven teams took part in the competition. They were drawn into three round robin groups, two groups of four teams and one group of three teams. The best placed team from each group and best placed runner-up would qualify for the semifinals. At the play-off placement matches, the tenth and ninth ranked teams during the group stages would face each other in the ninth-place match, the eighth and seventh ranked teams would face each other in the seventh-place match, and the sixth and fifth ranked team would face each other in the fifth-place match. The winning team from each semifinal would contest the gold medal match and the losing team from each would contest the bronze medal match.

=== Participants ===
- Jersey
- Guernsey
- Ynys Môn
- Isle of Man
- Hitra Municipality
- Western Isles
- Gibraltar
- Isle of Wight
- Gotland
- Åland
- Greenland

== Games ==
=== Group A ===
Åland won all three of their games and advanced to the semi-finals.

Rank	Nation	Pld	W	D	L	GF	GA	GD	Pts
1	Åland	3	3	0	0	14	2	12	9
2	Isle of Wight	3	2	0	1	9	1	8	6
3	Guernsey	3	1	0	2	3	12	−9	3
4	Ynys Môn	3	0	0	3	4	15	−11	0

28 June 2015
12:30

Guernsey	0–2	Isle of Wight

St John FC
28 June 2015
17:30

Ynys Môn	2–5	Åland

St Lawrence FC
29 June 2015
13:00

Isle of Wight	7–0	Ynys Môn

St Lawrence FC
29 June 2015
17:30

Åland	8–0	Guernsey

St Pauls FC
1 July 2015
13:00

Guernsey	3–2	Ynys Môn

Springfield
1 July 2015
13:00

Åland	3–2	Isle of Wight

St John FC

=== Group B ===
Isle of Man won all three of their matches while Gotland was the best placed runner-up, both advanced to the semi-finals.

Rank	Nation	Pld	W	D	L	GF	GA	GD	Pts
1	Isle of Man	3	3	0	0	10	3	7	9
2	Gotland	3	2	0	1	10	1	9	6
3	Western Isles	3	1	0	2	7	10	−3	3
4	Gibraltar	3	0	0	3	1	14	−13	0

28 June 2015
13:00

Gibraltar	0–3	Gotland

Trinity FC
28 June 2015
13:30

Western Isles	2–3	Isle of Man

St Lawrence FC
29 June 2015
13:00

Isle of Man	6–1	Gibraltar

Trinity FC
29 June 2015
17:30

Gotland	7–0	Western Isles

St Lawrence FC
1 July 2015
17:00

Isle of Man	1–0	Gotland

Trinity FC
1 July 2015
17:00

Gibraltar	0–5	Western Isles

St John FC

=== Group C ===
Jersey won all of their matches and advanced to the semi-finals.

Rank	Nation	Pld	W	D	L	GF	GA	GD	Pts
1	Jersey	2	2	0	0	5	3	2	6
2	Hitra Municipality	2	1	0	1	7	3	4	3
3	Greenland	2	0	0	2	3	9	−6	0

28 June 2015
17:00

Jersey	3–2	Greenland

Springfield
29 June 2015
13:30

Greenland	1–6	Hitra Municipality

St Pauls FC
1 July 2015
18:00

Jersey	2–1	Hitra Municipality

Springfield

== Placement play-off matches ==
=== 9th place match ===
Greenland defeated Ynys Môn in the ninth-place match.

2 July 2015
13:00

Greenland	4–0	Ynys Môn

Trinity FC

=== 7th place match ===
Guernsey defeated the Western Isles in the seventh-place match.

2 July 2015
17:30

Guernsey	2–4	Western Isles

St Pauls FC

=== 5th place match ===
The Isle of Wight defeated Hitra in the fifth-place match.

2 July
13:30

Isle of Wight	2–1	Hitra Municipality

St Pauls FC

== Final stage ==
=== Bracket ===
Semi-finals
2 July – Grouville FC
Åland	2
Isle of Man	1
2 July – Rozel Rovers FC
Jersey	3
Gotland	1

Final
3 July – Springfield
Åland	0
Jersey	1
Third place
3 July – St Brelade FC
Isle of Man	0
Gotland	2

==== Semi-finals ====
Åland defeated Isle of Man in the first semi-final match, while Jersey defeated Gotland in the second semi-final match.

2 July 2015
13:00

Åland	2–1	Isle of Man

Grouville

2 July 2015
13:00

Jersey	3–1	Gotland

Rozel Rovers

==== Third place match ====
Gotland defeated the Isle of Man in the bronze medal match.

3 July 2015
10:30

Isle of Man	0–2	Gotland

St Brelade FC

==== Final ====
Jersey defeated Åland in the gold medal match.

3 July 2015
10:30

Åland	0–1	Jersey

Springfield

2015 Island Games Winners
Jersey
1st title

== Final rankings ==
Rank	Team
Gold medal	Jersey
Silver medal	Åland
Bronze medal	Gotland
4	Isle of Man
5	Isle of Wight
6	Hitra Municipality
7	Western Isles
8	Guernsey
9	Greenland
10	Ynys Môn
11	Gibraltar

== See also ==
- Men's Football at the 2015 Island Games
- Football at the 2015 Island Games
