= Football at the 2023 Island Games – Women's tournament =

Women's Football at the Island Games 2023

Tournament details
- Host country: Guernsey
- Dates: 9 – 14 July
- Teams: 10
- Venue: 6 (in 3 host cities)

Final positions
- Champions: Bermuda (2nd title)
- Runners-up: Western Isles
- Third place: Isle of Man
- Fourth place: Menorca

Tournament statistics
- Matches played: 19
- Goals scored: 85 (4.47 per match)
- Top scorer(s): (Bermuda) Leilanni Nesbeth (Jersey) Eve Watson (Outer Hebrides) Sinead Macleod (4 Goals each)

The 2023 Island Games in Guernsey is the tenth edition in which a Woman's football tournament will be played at the multi-games competition.

== Participants ==
- Åland
- Bermuda
- Guernsey
- Hitra Municipality
- Isle of Man
- Isle of Wight
- Jersey
- Menorca
- Western Isles
- Ynys Môn

== Group Phase ==
The group phase is set to begin 9 July.

=== Group 1 ===
Pos	Team	Pld	W	D	L	GF	GA	GD	Pts	Qualification
1	Bermuda	3	3	0	0	10	0	+10	9	Final stage
2	Jersey	3	2	0	1	9	5	+4	6	
3	Åland	3	1	0	2	4	7	−3	3	
4	Hitra Municipality	3	0	0	3	1	12	−11	0	

Updated to match(es) played on 9 July 2023. Source: Guernsey 2023
Rules for classification: Group stage tiebreakers
9 July 2023
14:30

Bermuda	4–0	Jersey
Frazzoni 2'; Ratteray-Smith 34', 49'; Nesbeth 55'	Report

The Track, Saint Sampson
9 July 2023
14:30

Åland	3–1	Hitra Municipality
Kronström 45'; Kurtén 57'; Karlsson 90+3'	Report	Andreassen 57'

Northfield Stadium, Saint Sampson

10 July 2023
10:30

Jersey	4–1	Åland
Rodrigues 7'; Morris 12'; Watson 65'; Barnett 80'	Report	Rosenberg 43'

College Field, Saint Peter Port
10 July 2023
14:30

Hitra Municipality	0–4	Bermuda
	Report	Tutas 10'; Frazzoni 17'; Lowe-Darrell 60'; Nesbeth 73'

College Field, Saint Peter Port

11 July 2023
14:30

Hitra Municipality	0–5	Jersey
	Report	Docherty 17'; Watson 45+1'; Tavares 47', 65'; Morris 73'

Blanche Pierre Lane, Saint Martin
11 July 2023
14:30

Åland	0–2	Bermuda
	Report	Edwards 27'; Tutas 75'

College Field, Saint Peter Port

=== Group 2 ===
Pos	Team	Pld	W	D	L	GF	GA	GD	Pts	Qualification
1	Isle of Man	2	2	0	0	8	1	+7	6	Final stage
2	Menorca	2	1	0	1	4	5	−1	3	Final stage
3	Isle of Wight	2	0	0	2	2	8	−6	0	

Updated to match(es) played on 9 July 2023. Source: Guernsey 2023
Rules for classification: Group stage tiebreakers
9 July 2023
14:30

Isle of Man	3–1	Menorca
Sumner 15', 87'; Gawne 23'	Report	Mesquida Bonet 41'

College Field, Saint Peter Port

10 July 2023
10:30

Isle of Wight	0–5	Isle of Man
	Report	Cole 34', 61'; Gawne 50', 54' (pen.); Costain 56' (pen.)

Blanche Pierre Lane, Saint Martin

11 July 2023
14:30

Menorca	3–2	Isle of Wight
Segui Andreu 39'; Cansado Pons 41'; Mesquida Bonet 69'	Report	Brennen 85'; Bavington 89'

The Track, Saint Sampson

=== Group 3 ===
Pos	Team	Pld	W	D	L	GF	GA	GD	Pts	Qualification
1	Western Isles	2	2	0	0	12	1	+11	6	Final stage
2	Ynys Môn	2	1	0	1	4	8	−4	3	
3	Guernsey (H)	2	0	0	2	2	9	−7	0	

Updated to match(es) played on 9 July 2023. Source: Guernsey 2023
Rules for classification: Group stage tiebreakers
(H) Hosts
9 July 2023
10:30

Western Isles	6–1	Ynys Môn
S. Macleod 2'; O'Carroll 5'; Macphail 31'; J. Macleod 33'; C. MacKenzie 58'; K. Mackenzie 90+1'	Report	J. Jones 90+7'

College Field, Saint Peter Port

10 July 2023
14:30

Guernsey	2–3	Ynys Môn
Hedley 35' (pen.), 40'	Report	E. Jones 5'; Cox 29'; J. Jones 68'

The Corbet Field, Saint Sampson

11 July 2023
14:30

Guernsey	0–6	Western Isles
	Report	J. Macleod 16'; S. Macleod 23', 35'; McMurdo 54'; Macphail 56', 61'

The Corbet Field, Saint Sampson

=== Group Stage Ranking ===
Due to groups having a different number of teams, the results against the fourth-placed teams in groups with four teams were not considered for this ranking.

Pos	Grp	Team	Pld	W	D	L	GF	GA	GD	Pts	Qualification
1	3	Western Isles	2	2	0	0	12	1	+11	6	Final Stage
2	2	Isle of Man	2	2	0	0	8	1	+7	6	Final Stage
3	1	Bermuda	2	2	0	0	6	0	+6	6	Final Stage
4	2	Menorca	2	1	0	1	4	5	−1	3	Final Stage
5	3	Ynys Môn	2	1	0	1	4	8	−4	3	5th place match
6	1	Jersey	2	1	0	1	4	5	−1	3	5th place match
7	1	Åland	2	0	0	2	1	6	−5	0	7th place match
8	2	Isle of Wight	2	0	0	2	2	8	−6	0	7th place match
9	3	Guernsey	2	0	0	2	2	9	−7	0	9th place match
10	1	Hitra Municipality	3	0	0	3	1	12	−11	0	9th place match

Source: IGGGY 2023
Rules for classification: 1) group position; 2) points; 3) goal difference; 4) goals scored; 5) disciplinary points.

== Placement play-off matches ==
=== 9th place match ===
13 July 2023
14:30

Guernsey	3–4	Hitra Municipality
Leech 20'; Ogier 43'; Dallamore 48'	Report	Utby 3'; Antonsen 11', 23'; Glørstad 58'

Northfield, Saint Sampson

=== 7th place match ===
13 July 2023
10:30

Åland	3–2	Isle of Wight
Karlsson 3'; Kahnberg 19'; Kronström 41'	Report	Brennen 6'; Barron 30'

College Field, Saint Peter Port

=== 5th place match ===
13 July 2023
14:30

Jersey	2–3	Ynys Môn
Watson 12', 31'	Report	Cox 33'; Roberts 76'; Gadd 88'

College Field, Saint Peter Port

== Final Stage ==
=== Bracket ===
Semi-finals
13 July – Saint Sampson
Western Isles	3
Menorca	0
13 July – Saint Sampson
Isle of Man	0
Bermuda	1

Final
14 July – Saint Sampson
Western Isles	0
Bermuda	4
Third place
14 July – Saint Sampson
Menorca	1
Isle of Man	3

=== Semi-finals ===
13 July 2023
18:30

Western Isles	3–0	Menorca
B. Macleod 1', 17'; S. Macleod 30'	Report

Northfield, Saint Sampson

13 July 2023
18:30

Isle of Man	0–1	Bermuda
	Report	Nesbeth 54'

The Corbet Field, Saint Sampson

=== Third place match ===
14 July 2023
11:00

Menorca	1–3	Isle of Man
Cansado Pons 21'	Report	Sells 27'; Lisy 29'; Teare 87'

Northfield, Saint Sampson

=== Final ===
14 July 2023
12:00

Western Isles	0–4	Bermuda
	Report	Watson 25'; Nesbeth 48'; Furbert 60'; Ratteray-Smith 85'

The Corbet Field, Saint Sampson

== Statistics ==
=== Goalscorers ===
There were 85 goals scored in 19 matches, for an average of 4.47 goals per match (as of 14 July 2023).

4 goals

- (Bermuda) Leilanni Nesbeth
- (Jersey) Eve Watson
- (Outer Hebrides) Sinead Macleod

3 goals

- (Bermuda) Jya Ratteray-Smith
- (Isle of Man) Eleanor Gawne
- (Outer Hebrides) Shana Macphail

2 goals

- (Åland) Fanny Karlsson
- (Åland) Cajsa Kronström
- (Bermuda) Eva Frazzoni
- (Bermuda) Ashley Tutas
- (Hitra Municipality) Nina Antonsen
- (Guernsey) Calleigh Hedley
- (Isle of Man) Holly Sumner
- (Isle of Man) Rebecca Cole
- (Isle of Wight) Sienna Brennen
- (Jersey) Leah Morris
- (Jersey) Anita Tavares
- (Menorca) Aina Mesquida Bonet
- (Menorca) Tamara Cansado Pons
- (Outer Hebrides) Jessica Macleod
- (Outer Hebrides) Beth Macleod
- (Anglesey) Jessica Jones
- (Anglesey) Jennifer Cox

1 goal

- (Åland) Minna Kurtén
- (Åland) Milla Rosenberg
- (Åland) Alva Kahnberg
- (Bermuda) Symira Lowe-Darrell
- (Bermuda) Trinae Edwards
- (Bermuda) Danni Watson
- (Bermuda) Akeyla Furbert
- (Hitra Municipality) Anna Andreassen
- (Hitra Municipality) Kaia Utby
- (Hitra Municipality) Silje Glørstad
- (Guernsey) Adrienne Leech
- (Guernsey) Bella Ogier
- (Guernsey) Amy Dallamore
- (Isle of Man) Lisa Costain
- (Isle of Man) Erin Sells
- (Isle of Man) Tia Lisy
- (Isle of Man) Chloe Teare
- (Isle of Wight) Jasmine Bavington
- (Isle of Wight) Katie Barron
- (Jersey) Sofia Rodrigues
- (Jersey) Liberty Barnett
- (Jersey) Ella Docherty
- (Menorca) Ainhoa Segui Andreu
- (Outer Hebrides) Catriona O'Carroll
- (Outer Hebrides) Christie MacKenzie
- (Outer Hebrides) Kayleigh Mackenzie
- (Outer Hebrides) Kyla McMurdo
- (Anglesey) Ellie Jones
- (Anglesey) Mia Roberts
- (Anglesey) Cerys Gadd

=== Final ranking ===
Rank	Team
Gold medal	Bermuda
Silver medal	Western Isles
Bronze medal	Isle of Man
4	Menorca
5	Ynys Môn
6	Jersey
7	Åland
8	Isle of Wight
9	Hitra Municipality
10	Guernsey

== See also ==
- Football at the 2023 Island Games – Men's tournament
- Football at the 2023 Island Games
