= Football at the 2017 Island Games – Women's tournament =

Women's Football at the Island Games 2017

Tournament details
- Host country: Gotland, Sweden
- Dates: 24–30 June
- Teams: 11

Final positions
- Champions: Gotland (1st title)
- Runners-up: Isle of Man
- Third place: Jersey
- Fourth place: Isle of Wight

Tournament statistics
- Matches played: 22

The 2017 Island Games, which took place on the island of Gotland, Sweden, was the fifteenth edition of the Island Games in which a football tournament was played at the multi-games competition and the ninth Women's tournament.

Women's Football at the 2017 Island Games forms part of the Football at the 2017 Island Games event.

== Participants ==
- Åland
- Gibraltar
- Gotland
- Greenland
- Hitra Municipality
- Isle of Man
- Isle of Wight
- Jersey
- Menorca
- Western Isles
- Ynys Môn

== Venues ==
Ground
Dalhem
Fardhem
Fårösund
Hemse
Stenkyrka
Väskinde
Visby (Gutavallen)
Visby (Säve)
Visby (Visborgsvallen)

Women's football venues of the 2017 Island Games in Gotland

== Group Phase ==
=== Group A ===
Rank	Nation	Pld	W	D	L	GF	GA	GD	Pts
1	Gotland	3	3	0	0	13	1	+12	9
2	Menorca	3	2	0	1	5	7	–2	6
3	Greenland	3	1	0	2	4	10	–6	3
4	Hitra Municipality	3	0	0	3	3	7	–4	0

25 June 2017
13:00

Greenland	0–6	Gotland

Visby (Visborgsvallen)

25 June 2017
13:00

Hitra Municipality	1–2	Menorca

Dalhem

26 June 2017
13:00

Menorca	2–1	Greenland

Dalhem

26 June 2017
20:45

Gotland	2–0	Hitra Municipality

Visby (Gutavallen)

28 June 2017
17:00

Gotland	5–1	Menorca

Väskinde

28 June 2017
17:00

Hitra Municipality	2–3	Greenland

Stenkyrka

=== Group B ===
Rank	Nation	Pld	W	D	L	GF	GA	GD	Pts
1	Isle of Man	3	2	0	1	6	2	+4	6
2	Åland	3	2	0	1	9	6	+3	6
3	Western Isles	3	2	0	1	8	6	+2	6
4	Ynys Môn	3	0	0	3	2	11	–9	0

25 June 2017
13:00

Åland	5–2	Western Isles

Stenkyrka

25 June 2017
13:00

Isle of Man	3–0	Ynys Môn

Väskinde

26 June 2017
13:00

Ynys Môn	1–4	Åland

Visby (Visborgsvallen)

26 June 2017
13:00

Western Isles	2–0	Isle of Man

Fårösund

28 June 2017
17:00

Åland	0–3	Isle of Man

Dalhem

28 June 2017
17:00

Western Isles	4–1	Ynys Môn

Visby (Säve)

=== Group C ===
Rank	Nation	Pld	W	D	L	GF	GA	GD	Pts
1	Isle of Wight	2	2	0	0	11	3	+8	6
2	Jersey	2	1	0	1	8	3	+5	3
3	Gibraltar	2	0	0	2	1	14	–13	0

25 June 2017
13:00

Jersey	2–3	Isle of Wight

Fardhem

26 June 2017
13:00

Isle of Wight	8–1	Gibraltar

Väskinde

28 June 2017
17:00

Gibraltar	0–6	Jersey

Visby (Visborgsvallen)

== Placement play-off matches ==
=== 9th place match ===
29 June 2017
17:00

Gibraltar	0–1	Hitra Municipality

Väskinde

=== 7th place match ===
29 June 2017
13:00

Western Isles	2–1	Greenland

Hemse

=== 5th place match ===
29 June 2017
17:00

Åland	2–2	Menorca
Penalties
	5–4

Visby (Visborgsvallen)

== Final stage ==
=== Bracket ===
Semi-finals
29 June – Visborgsvallen
Gotland	2
Jersey	1
29 June – Stenkyrka
Isle of Man	4
Isle of Wight	2

Final
30 June – Gutavallen
Gotland	2
Isle of Man	1
Third place
29 June – Visborgsvallen
Jersey	3
Isle of Wight	1

==== Semi-finals ====
29 June 2017
13:00

Gotland	2–1	Jersey

Visby (Visborgsvallen)

29 June 2017
13:00

Isle of Man	4–2	Isle of Wight

Stenkyrka

==== Third place match ====
30 June 2017
10:00

Jersey	3–1	Isle of Wight

Visby (Visborgsvallen)

==== Final ====
30 June 2017
10:30

Gotland	2–1	Isle of Man

Visby (Gutavallen)

== Final rankings ==
Rank	Team
Gold medal	Gotland
Silver medal	Isle of Man
Bronze medal	Jersey
4	Isle of Wight
5	Åland
6	Menorca
7	Western Isles
8	Greenland
9	Hitra Municipality
10	Gibraltar
11	Ynys Môn

== See also ==
- Men's Football at the 2017 Island Games
