= Åland women's official football team =

Åland
- Association: Åland Football Association (ÅFF)
- Head coach: Gary Williams
- Captain: Ellen Ahlqvist
- Home stadium: Wiklöf Holding Arena
- FIFA code: AXL
First colours	Second colours

FIFA ranking
- Current: NR (7 August 2025)

First international
- Åland 9–1 Guernsey (Isle of Man; 8 July 2001)

Biggest win
- Åland 20–0 Saare County (Finström, Åland; 29 June 2009)

Biggest defeat
- Åland 0–3 Isle of Man (Dalhem, Belgium; 28 June 2017)

The Åland women's official football team represents Åland in women's association football and is controlled by the Åland Football Association (ÅFF). the team isn't affiliated with FIFA nor UEFA. The team mainly competes in the Island Games. the team was crowned champions winning gold medals three times (2007, 2009 and 2011).

Åland also has a successful women's club football side, Åland United which competes in the Kansallinen Liiga.

== Results and fixtures ==
The following is a list of match results in the last 12 months, as well as any future matches that have been scheduled.

Legend

Win Draw Lose Fixture

=== 2023 ===
9 July 2023 2023 Island Games	Åland	3–1	Hitra Municipality	Saint Sampson,Guernsey
14:30 UTC+1	Kronström 45'; Kurtén 57'; Karlsson 90+3'	Report	Andreassen 57'	Stadium: Northfield Stadium

10 July 2023 2023 Island Games	Jersey	4–1	Åland	Saint Peter Port, Guernsey
10:30 UTC+1	Rodrigues 7'; Morris 12'; Watson 65'; Barnett 80'	Report	Rosenberg 43'	Stadium: College Field

11 July 2023 2023 Island Games	Åland	0–2	Bermuda	Saint Peter Port, Guernsey
14:30 UTC+1		Report	Edwards 27'; Tutas 75'	Stadium: College Field

13 July 2023 2023 Island Games	Åland	3–2	Isle of Wight	Saint Peter Port, Guernsey
10:30 UTC+1	Karlsson 3'; Kahnberg 19'; Kronström 41'	Report	Brennen 6'; Barron 30'	Stadium: College Field

== Competitive record ==
=== Football at the Island Games ===
Island Games record
Year	Round	Position	Pld	W	D*	L	GS	GA
(Isle of Man) 2001	Runners-up	2nd	5	4	0	1	44	8
(Guernsey) 2003	Did not enter							
(Shetland) 2005	Runners-up	2nd	5	4	0	1	18	4
(Rhodes) 2007	Champions	1st	4	4	0	0	15	0
(Åland) 2009	Champions	1st	6	6	0	0	41	4
(Isle of Wight) 2011	Champions	1st	5	4	1	0	23	3
(Bermuda) 2013	Did not enter							
(Jersey) 2015	Runners-up	2nd	5	4	0	1	16	4
(Gotland) 2017	5th place Match	5th	4	2	1	1	11	8
(Gibraltar) 2019	Did not enter							
(Guernsey) 2023	7th place Match	7th	3	2	0	2	7	9
(Orkney) 2025	To be determined							
(Anglesey) 2027	To be determined							
(Isle of Man) 2029	To be determined							
Appearances	7/10	1st	34	28	2	4	168	31

== Players ==
=== Current squad ===
- The following players were named for the 2023 Islands Games.

No.	Pos.	Player	Date of birth (age)	Club
1	GK	Ellen Ahlström	2 August 1990 (age 35)	
4		Lisa Sarling		(Åland Football Association) IFK Mariehamn
5		Ronja Eklund		
6	FW	Alva Kahnberg		
7		Sofia Lindström		
8		Elin Simolin		(Åland Football Association) IFK Mariehamn
9	MF	Othilia Nordberg		(Åland Football Association) Åland United
10	MF	Milla Rosenberg	10 February 2004 (age 21)	(Åland Football Association) Åland United
11		Tilda Engström		
13		Emelina Simolin		
15		Fanny Karlsson		(Åland Football Association) IFK Mariehamn
16	GK	Ann-Sofie Gripenberg	22 November 1999 (age 25)	
17	MF	Minna Kurtén	20 February 2005 (age 20)	(Åland Football Association) Åland United
18	DF	Pille Raadik	12 February 1987 (age 38)	Retired
21		Cajsa Kronström		
22	DF	Vera Hällefors	14 September 2004 (age 21)	(Swedish Football Association) IF VP Uppsala
23		Elin Andersson		
24	MF	Stella Luoma		(Åland Football Association) Åland United
25		Zaida Blomqvist		(Åland Football Association) IFK Mariehamn
