= Football at the 2011 Island Games – Women's tournament =

Women's Football at the Island Games 2011
Tournament details
- Host country: Isle of Wight
- Dates: 26 June – 1 July
- Teams: 10

Final positions
- Champions: Åland (3rd title)
- Runners-up: Isle of Man
- Third place: Greenland
- Fourth place: Western Isles

Tournament statistics
- Matches played: 19
- Goals scored: 79 (4.16 per match)

The 2011 Island Games on the Isle of Wight, England, was the 6th edition in which a women's football tournament was played at the multi-games competition. It was contested by 10 teams.

== Participants ==
- Åland
- Gibraltar
- Gotland
- Greenland
- Hitra Municipality
- Isle of Man
- Isle of Wight
- Jersey
- Saare County
- Western Isles

== Group Phase ==
=== Group A ===
Rank	Nation	Pld	W	D	L	GF	GA	GD	Pts
1	Åland	3	2	1	0	12	1	+11	7
2	Isle of Wight	3	1	2	0	6	3	+3	5
3	Jersey	3	1	1	1	8	8	0	4
4	Hitra Municipality	3	0	0	3	1	15	−14	0

To achieve parity with the other groups, which were composed of three teams, the results of the group's bottom team were expunged from the table for the purpose of calculating which teams would advance to the semi-finals and which would play in the matches for fifth and seventh places. The revised table was thus :

Rank	Nation	Pld	W	D	L	GF	GA	GD	Pts
1	Åland	2	1	1	0	6	1	+5	4
2	Isle of Wight	2	0	2	0	3	3	0	2
3	Jersey	2	0	1	1	2	7	–5	1

26 June 2011
14:00

Åland	5–0	Jersey
Andersson 16', 40'; Flöjt 22'; Salmén 74'; Eriksson 82'	Report

Green Lane, Shanklin
Referee: Steve Wade

26 June 2011
14:00

Hitra Municipality	0–3	Isle of Wight
	Report

Beatrice Avenue, East Cowes
Referee: Kevin Bungay

27 June 2011
11:30

Isle of Wight	1–1	Åland
Merryfield 69'	Report	Björkvall 3'

Salters Road, Oakfield
Referee: Sarah Garratt

27 June 2011
15:00

Jersey	6–1	Hitra Municipality
Sauvage 10', 63'; Botterill 20', 42', 86'; Marie 39'	Report	Antonsen 35'

Vicarage Lane, Brading
Referee: Robert Dabbs

28 June 2011
14:00

Isle of Wight	2–2	Jersey
Merryfield 32'; Hayles 36'	Report	Botterill 16'; Darts 46'

Westwood Park, Cowes
Referee: Anton Beavis

28 June 2011
18:00

Åland	6–0	Hitra Municipality
Engman 11', 13'; Flöjt 19'; Ahlström 20', 82'; Klingberg 47'	Report

Community Club, Cowes

=== Group B ===
Rank	Nation	Pld	W	D	L	GF	GA	Pts	GD
1	Isle of Man	2	2	0	0	12	1	+11	6
2	Greenland	2	1	0	1	9	3	+6	3
3	Gibraltar	2	0	0	2	0	17	−17	0

26 June 2011
18:30

Isle of Man	9–0	Gibraltar
Burden 10', 51', 53'; Gawne 25', 40'; Christian 44'; Hicklin 45'; Smalley 64'; Harrison 84'	Report

Green Lane, Shanklin
Referee: Simon Johnson

27 June 2011
16:00

Isle of Man	3–1	Greenland
Burden 14'; Christian 56'; Gawne 85'	Report	Abelsen 26'

Salters Road, Oakfield
Referee: Gary Hughes

28 June 2011
19:00

Greenland	8–0	Gibraltar
Johnsen 10'; Reimer 41'; Egede 44', 74', 81'; Reimer 50'; Ugpernângitsok 61', 68'	Report

Westwood Park, Cowes
Referee: Neil Williams

=== Group C ===
Rank	Nation	Pld	W	D	L	GF	GA	GD	Pts
1	Western Isles	2	1	1	0	2	0	+2	4
2	Saare County	2	1	0	1	1	2	−1	3
3	Gotland	2	0	1	1	0	1	−1	1

26 June 2011
14:00

Gotland	0–1	Saare County
	Report	Randla 37'

Salters Road, Oakfield

27 June 2011
14:00

Saare County	0–2	Western Isles
	Report	Paton 34'; Martin 79'

Green Lane, Shanklin
Referee: Craig Burton

28 June 2011
19:00

Gotland	0–0	Western Isles
	Report

Vicarage Lane, Brading
Referee: Paul Phillips

== Placement play-off matches ==
=== 9th place match ===
30 June 2011
18:00

Hitra Municipality	5–0	Gibraltar
Wingan 10', 25'; Jorgensen 53'; Sandstad 58'; Antonsen 67'	Report

Community Club, Cowes
Referee: Neil Williams

=== 7th place match ===
30 June 2011
14:30

Jersey	1–2	Gotland
Vieira 11'	Report	Yttergren 35'; Larsson 46'

Salters Road, Oakfield
Referee: Lucy May

=== 5th place match ===
30 June 2011
19:00

Saare County	0–2	Isle of Wight
	Report	Wright 51', 59'

Westwood Park, Cowes
Referee: Stephen Graham

== Final stage ==
=== Bracket ===
Semi-finals
30 June – East Cowes
Åland	6
Greenland	1
30 June – Newport
Isle of Man	4
Western Isles	0

Final
1 July – East Cowes
Isle of Man	1
Åland	5
Third place
1 July – Cowes
Western Isles	0
Greenland	1

==== Semifinals ====
30 June 2011
12:00

Åland	6–1	Greenland
Eriksson 47'; Klingberg 53', 56'; Karring 65'; Liljegren 67', 80'	Report	Reimer 78'

Beatrice Avenue, East Cowes
Referee: Kevin Bungay

30 June 2011
12:00

Isle of Man	4–0	Western Isles
Gawne 25', 44'; O'Reilly 60'; Christian 71'	Report

St Georges Park, Newport
Referee: Ben Cobb

==== Third place match ====
1 July 2011
10:00

Western Isles	0–1	Greenland
	Report	Malakiassen 75'

Beatrice Avenue, East Cowes
Referee: Lucy May

==== Final ====
1 July 2011
12:00

Åland	5–1	Isle of Man
Engman 26', 45'; Klingberg 29'; Liljegren 44'; Hall 67' (o.g.)	Report	Burden 4'

Westwood Park, Cowes
Referee: James Linnington

2011 Island Games Winners
Åland Islands
3rd title

== Final rankings ==
Rank	Team
Gold medal	Åland
Silver medal	Isle of Man
Bronze medal	Greenland
4	Western Isles
5	Isle of Wight
6	Saare County
7	Gotland
8	Jersey
9	Hitra Municipality
10	Gibraltar

== See also ==
- Men's Football at the 2011 Island Games
