= Football at the 2007 Island Games – Women's tournament =

Women's Football at the Island Games 2007
Tournament details
- Host country: Rhodes
- Dates: 30 June – 6 July
- Teams: 11

Final positions
- Champions: Åland (1st title)
- Runners-up: Prince Edward Island
- Third place: Bermuda
- Fourth place: Isle of Man

Tournament statistics
- Matches played: 21
- Goals scored: 68 (3.24 per match)

The 2007 Island Games on the island of Rhodes was the 4th edition in which a women's football tournament was played at the multi-games competition. It was contested by 11 teams.

Åland won the tournament for the first time.

== Participants ==
- Åland
- Bermuda
- Gotland
- Greenland
- Guernsey
- Isle of Man
- Isle of Wight
- Jersey
- Prince Edward Island
- Rhodes
- Western Isles

== Group Phase ==
=== Group A ===
| Rank | Nation | Pld | W | D | L | GF | GA | Pts | GD |
|---|---|---|---|---|---|---|---|---|---|
| 1 | Prince Edward Island | 2 | 2 | 0 | 0 | 8 | 0 | 6 | +8 |
| 2 | Isle of Wight | 2 | 1 | 0 | 1 | 1 | 4 | 3 | –1 |
| 3 | Jersey | 2 | 0 | 0 | 2 | 0 | 5 | 0 | –5 |

30 June 2007

| Jersey | 0–1 | Isle of Wight |

Afandou

1 July 2007

| Prince Edward Island | 4–0 | Jersey |

Koskinou

2 July 2007

| Isle of Wight | 0–4 | Prince Edward Island |

Kremasti

=== Group B ===
| Rank | Nation | Pld | W | D | L | GF | GA | Pts | GD |
|---|---|---|---|---|---|---|---|---|---|
| 1 | Bermuda | 2 | 2 | 0 | 0 | 7 | 3 | 6 | +4 |
| 2 | Guernsey | 2 | 1 | 0 | 1 | 3 | 3 | 3 | 0 |
| 3 | Western Isles | 2 | 0 | 0 | 2 | 2 | 6 | 0 | –4 |

30 June 2007

| Western Isles | 2–4 | Bermuda |

Agios Apostolos

1 July 2007

| Guernsey | 2–0 | Western Isles |

Afandou
2 July 2007

| Bermuda | 3–1 | Guernsey |

Koskinou

=== Group C ===
| Rank | Nation | Pld | W | D | L | GF | GA | Pts | GD |
|---|---|---|---|---|---|---|---|---|---|
| 1 | Åland | 2 | 2 | 0 | 0 | 10 | 0 | 6 | +10 |
| 2 | Greenland | 2 | 1 | 0 | 1 | 5 | 2 | 3 | +3 |
| 3 | Rhodes | 2 | 0 | 0 | 2 | 0 | 13 | 0 | –13 |

30 June 2007

| Rhodes | 0–5 | Greenland |

Koskinou

1 July 2007

| Greenland | 0–2 | Åland |

Agios Apostolos

2 July 2007

| Åland | 8–0 | Rhodes |

Afandou

=== Group D ===
| Rank | Nation | Pld | W | D | L | GF | GA | Pts | GD |
|---|---|---|---|---|---|---|---|---|---|
| 1 | Isle of Man | 2 | 1 | 0 | 1 | 4 | 3 | 3 | +1 |
| 2 | Gotland | 2 | 1 | 0 | 1 | 3 | 4 | 3 | –1 |

1 July 2007

| Gotland | 2–1 | Isle of Man |

Kremasti

2 July 2007

| Isle of Man | 3–1 | Gotland |

Agios Apostolos

== Placement play-off & knock-out matches ==
=== 9th – 11th place semi-final ===
4 July 2007

| Jersey | 0–1 | Western Isles |

Agios Apostolos

=== 5th – 8th place semi-finals ===
4 July 2007

| Isle of Wight | 1–0 | Guernsey |

Kremasti

4 July 2007

| Gotland | 2–1 | Greenland |

Agios Apostolos

=== 9th place match ===
5 July 2007

| Western Isles | 2–0 (a.e.t.) | Rhodes |

Agios Apostolos

=== 7th place match ===
5 July 2007

| Guernsey | 3–0 | Greenland |

Koskinou

=== 5th place match ===
5 July 2007

| Isle of Wight | 3–2 | Gotland |

Kremasti

== Final stage ==
=== Semi-finals ===
4 July 2007

| Prince Edward Island | 5–0 | Bermuda |

Koskinou

4 July 2007

| Åland | 2–0 | Isle of Man |

Afandou

=== 3rd place match ===
5 July 2007

| Bermuda | 0–0 | Isle of Man |
Penalties
| | 4–3 |

Afandou

=== Final ===
6 July 2007

| Åland | 3–0 | Prince Edward Island |

Koskinou

2007 Island Games Winners
Åland Islands
First Title

== Final rankings ==
| Rank | Team |
|---|---|
| Gold medal | Åland |
| Silver medal | Prince Edward Island |
| Bronze medal | Bermuda |
| 4 | Isle of Man |
| 5 | Isle of Wight |
| 6 | Gotland |
| 7 | Guernsey |
| 8 | Greenland |
| 9 | Western Isles |
| 10 | Rhodes |
| 11 | Jersey |

== See also ==
- Men's Football at the 2007 Island Games
