= Football at the 2009 Island Games – Women's tournament =

Women's Football at the Island Games 2009
Tournament details
- Host country: Åland Islands
- Dates: 28 June – 4 July
- Teams: 10
- Venue: 7 (in 7 host cities)

Final positions
- Champions: Åland (2nd title)
- Runners-up: Gotland
- Third place: Isle of Man
- Fourth place: Isle of Wight

Tournament statistics
- Matches played: 24
- Goals scored: 141 (5.88 per match)
- Top scorer(s): (Isle of Man) Donna Shimmin (8 goals)

The 2009 Island Games in Åland was the 5th edition in which a women's football tournament was played at the multi-games competition. It was contested by 10 teams.

Åland won the tournament for the second time.

== Participants ==
- Åland
- Gotland
- Greenland
- Guernsey
- Hitra Municipality
- Isle of Man
- Isle of Wight
- Jersey
- Saare County
- Western Isles

== Group phase ==
=== Group A ===
Rank	Nation	Pld	W	D	L	GF	GA	Pts	GD
1	Åland	4	4	0	0	32	3	12	+29
2	Gotland	4	3	0	1	16	4	9	+12
3	Jersey	4	2	0	2	12	11	6	+1
4	Greenland	4	1	0	3	10	15	3	–5
5	Saare County	4	0	0	4	3	40	0	–37

28 June 2009

Gotland	5–1	Jersey
Nilsson 26', 35'; Ronström 80', 86'; Nilsson 90'		Botterill 90'

Markusböle, Finström

28 June 2009

Greenland	6–2	Saare County
Reimer 17'; Magnussen 22', 47', 90'; Chemnitz 50', 90'		Õige 20'; Laht 31'

Bengtsböle, Lemland

29 June 2009

Jersey	3–1	Greenland
Botterill 3', 58'; Couvert 82'		Chemnitz 22' (pen.)

Bengtsböle, Lemland

29 June 2009

Åland	20–0	Saare County
Björkvall 2', 17', 85'; Mörn 4', 26'; Holmberg 23', 54', 74', 84'; Haglund 30', 37'; Engblom 38', 63'; Liljegren 42'; Salmén 48', 60', 86', 90'; Klingberg 79', 89'

Markusböle, Finström

30 June 2009

Gotland	7–0	Saare County
Hansson 13'; Adman 23'; Ronström 25' (pen.); Edwardsson 64'; Liljeström 70'; Lillro 80', 81'

Bengtsböle, Lemland

30 June 2009

Åland	6–2	Greenland
Mörn 22'; Sjölund 67', 80', 90'; Salmén 85', 89'		Bourup Egede 25'; Malakiassen 65'

Vikingavallen, Jomala

1 July 2009

Åland	2–0	Gotland
Liljegren 69'; Karring 74'

Bengtsböle, Lemland
Attendance: 600

1 July 2009

Jersey	7–1	Saare County
Botterill 26', 44', 45', 50'; Darts 31'; Van der Vliet 40'; Du Heaume 77'		Salong 25'

Markusböle, Finström

2 July 2009

Åland	4–1	Jersey
Holmberg 9'; Mörn 12'; Salmén 34'; Bell 45' (o.g.)		Sauvage 42'

Markusböle, Finström

2 July 2009

Gotland	4–1	Greenland
Nilsson 36'; Ronström 43', 53'; Nilsson 46'		Malakiassen 21'

Bengtsböle, Lemland

=== Group B ===
Rank	Nation	Pld	W	D	L	GF	GA	Pts	GD
1	Isle of Man	4	4	0	0	25	3	12	+22
2	Isle of Wight	4	3	0	1	8	4	9	+4
3	Western Isles	4	2	0	2	10	6	6	+4
4	Guernsey	4	0	1	3	3	13	1	–10
5	Hitra Municipality	4	0	1	3	3	23	1	–20

28 June 2009

Isle of Man	4–1	Isle of Wight
Murphy 13' (o.g.); Shimmin 28'; Christian 58'; O'Reilly 63'		Miller 68'

Vikingavallen, Jomala

28 June 2009

Hitra Municipality	2–2	Guernsey
Mjør Wingan 63'; Sandstad 80'		Vaudin 83', 90'

Markusböle, Finström

29 June 2009

Isle of Man	4–1	Western Isles
Gawne 7' (pen.), 48', 62'; Cole 55'		Stewart 30'

Bengtsböle, Lemland

29 June 2009

Isle of Wight	2–0	Guernsey
Cullen 43'; Masterton 84'

Solvallen, Eckerö

30 June 2009

Isle of Man	13–0	Hitra Municipality
Shimmin 12', 18', 38', 52', 53', 62', 73'; Burden 37', 39'; Hicklin 45', 76'; Gawne 58'; Christian 87'

Solvallen, Eckerö

30 June 2009

Isle of Wight	1–0	Western Isles
Jackson 23' (pen.)

Bengtsböle, Lemland

1 July 2009

Western Isles	4–1	Hitra Municipality
MacLeod 3', 17', 90'; Stewart 65'		Baglo Lund 2'

Solvallen, Eckerö

1 July 2009

Guernsey	1–4	Isle of Man
Sylvester 58'		Harrison 37', 45', 76'; Breen 47'

Sportkila, Sund

2 July 2009

Hitra Municipality	0–4	Isle of Wight
		Wright 4'; Webb 23'; Crews 34', 71'

Solvallen, Eckerö

2 July 2009

Guernsey	0–5	Western Isles
		Johnson 20', 45'; Stewart 35'; Macdonald 66'; Nicolson 75'

Rangsby, Saltvik

== Final stage ==
=== Semi-finals ===
3 July 2009

Åland	7–1	Isle of Wight
Haglund 30'; Mörn 54', 84'; Karring 61'; Liljegren 77'; Kohvakka 80'; Engblom 88'		Merryfield 6'

Bengtsböle, Lemland

3 July 2009

Isle of Man	1–4	Gotland
Gawne 16' (pen.)		Ronström 43'; Karlsson 50', 85', 90'

Hammarvallen, Hammarland

=== 3rd place match ===
4 July 2009

Isle of Man	3–1	Isle of Wight
Christian 17'; Gawne 64'; Burden 90'		Cullen 28'

Sportkila, Sund

=== Final ===
4 July 2009

Åland	2–0	Gotland
Kohvakka 21'; Björkvall 59'

Wiklöf Holding Arena, Mariehamn
Attendance: 2,000

2009 Island Games Winners
Åland Islands
Second Title

== Final rankings ==
Rank	Team
Gold medal	Åland
Silver medal	Gotland
Bronze medal	Isle of Man
4	Isle of Wight
5	Western Isles
6	Jersey
7	Greenland
8	Guernsey
9	Hitra Municipality
10	Saare County

No positional playoffs were played in this tournament. Final rankings from 5th to 10th are based on group positions.

== Top goalscorers ==
8 goals

- (Isle of Man) Donna Shimmin

7 goals

- (Jersey) Jodie Botterill
- (Åland) Hannah Salmén

6 goals

- (Gotland) Camilla Ronström
- (Åland) Mathilda Mörn
- (Isle of Man) Eleanor Gawne

5 goals

- (Åland) Ing-Marie Holmberg

4 goals

- (Åland) Rebecca Björkvall

3 goals

- (Gotland) Marion Nilsson
- (Gotland) Sahra Karlsson
- (Greenland) Pilunnguaq Magnussen
- (Åland) Annica Sjölund
- (Åland) Daniela Haglund
- (Åland) Sarah Engblom
- (Isle of Man) Gillian Christian
- (Isle of Man) Jade Burden
- (Isle of Man) Donna Harrison
- (Outer Hebrides) Jenna Stewart
- (Outer Hebrides) Sinead McLeod

== See also ==
Men's Football at the 2009 Island Games
