= Football at the 2017 Island Games – Men's tournament =

Men's Football at the Island Games 2017

Tournament details
- Host country: Gotland, Sweden
- Dates: 24–30 June
- Teams: 16

Final positions
- Champions: Isle of Man (1st title)
- Runners-up: Greenland
- Third place: Guernsey
- Fourth place: Menorca

Tournament statistics
- Matches played: 34

Men's Football at the 2017 Island Games forms part of the Football at the 2017 Island Games event, and is the fifteenth edition of the Games in which the sport has been played.

== Participants ==
- Åland
- Alderney
- Falkland Islands
- Frøya
- Gotland
- Greenland
- Guernsey
- Hitra Municipality
- Isle of Man
- Jersey
- Menorca
- Orkney
- Saare County
- Shetland
- Western Isles
- Ynys Môn

== Venues ==
Ground
Dalhem
Fardhem
Fårösund
Hemse
Stenkyrka
Väskinde
Visby (Gutavallen)
Visby (Säve)
Visby (Visborgsvallen)

Men's football venues of the 2017 Island Games in Gotland

== Group Phase ==
=== Group A ===
| Rank | Nation | Pld | W | D | L | GF | GA | GD | Pts |
|---|---|---|---|---|---|---|---|---|---|
| 1 | Menorca | 3 | 2 | 1 | 0 | 10 | 3 | +7 | 7 |
| 2 | Jersey | 3 | 2 | 1 | 0 | 9 | 3 | +6 | 7 |
| 3 | Orkney | 3 | 1 | 0 | 2 | 3 | 4 | –1 | 3 |
| 4 | Alderney | 3 | 0 | 0 | 3 | 0 | 12 | –12 | 0 |

25 June
17:00

| Menorca | 1–0 | Orkney |
|---|---|---|
| Arguimbau 73' | Report |

Stenkyrka

25 June
17:00

| Alderney | 0–3 | Jersey |
|---|---|---|
| | Report | Russell 11'; Le Quesne 57'; Weir 82' |

Väskinde

26 June
17:00

| Jersey | 3–3 | Menorca |
|---|---|---|
| Hinds 70', 83', 89' | Report | Lacalle 34', 52' own goal ?' |

Visby (Visborgsvallen)

26 June
13:00

| Orkney | 3–0 | Alderney |
|---|---|---|
| Bews 4'; Drever 40'; Stout 46' | Report |

Hemse

27 June
17:00

| Menorca | 6–0 | Alderney |
|---|---|---|
| Rubio 2', 41', 66', 88'; Lacalle 45'; Pons 90' | Report |

Fårösund

27 June
17:00

| Orkney | 0–3 | Jersey |
|---|---|---|
| | Report | Hinds 35'; Lester 39', 72' |

Väskinde

=== Group B ===
| Rank | Nation | Pld | W | D | L | GF | GA | GD | Pts |
|---|---|---|---|---|---|---|---|---|---|
| 1 | Greenland | 3 | 2 | 1 | 0 | 6 | 2 | +4 | 7 |
| 2 | Gotland | 3 | 2 | 0 | 1 | 15 | 2 | +13 | 6 |
| 3 | Western Isles | 3 | 1 | 0 | 2 | 4 | 13 | –9 | 3 |
| 4 | Frøya | 3 | 0 | 1 | 2 | 5 | 13 | –8 | 1 |

25 June
17:00

| Greenland | 3–0 | Western Isles |
|---|---|---|
| Svane 20'; Zeeb 45'; Bistrup 90' | Report |

Säve

25 June
20:45

| Gotland | 7–1 | Frøya |
|---|---|---|
| Dahlström 2', 72'; Öhman 38', 58', 67'; Zackrisson 86'; Engqvist 90' | Report | Mathisen 88' |

Visby (Gutavallen)

26 June
17:00

| Western Isles | 0–8 | Gotland |
|---|---|---|
| | Report | Öhman 16', 70', 72'; Eneqvist 52'; Zackrisson 53'; Dahlström 59', 80'; Starkenberg 89' |

Dalhem

26 June
17:00

| Frøya | 2–2 | Greenland |
|---|---|---|
| Sørdal 13'; Johansen 40' | Report | Mathæussen 27'; Juhl 77' |

Hemse

27 June
17:00

| Gotland | 0–1 | Greenland |
|---|---|---|
| | Report | Mathæussen 4' |

Visby (Visborgsvallen)

27 June
17:00

| Frøya | 2–4 | Western Isles |
|---|---|---|
| Jasaites 34'; Johansen 45' | Report | Smith 26'; Macdonald 33', 48'; Munro 90' |

Säve

=== Group C ===
| Rank | Nation | Pld | W | D | L | GF | GA | GD | Pts |
|---|---|---|---|---|---|---|---|---|---|
| 1 | Guernsey | 3 | 1 | 2 | 0 | 5 | 2 | +3 | 5 |
| 2 | Åland | 3 | 1 | 2 | 0 | 3 | 2 | +1 | 5 |
| 3 | Shetland | 3 | 1 | 0 | 2 | 6 | 9 | –3 | 3 |
| 4 | Saare County | 3 | 0 | 2 | 1 | 5 | 6 | –1 | 2 |

25 June
17:00

| Guernsey | 1–1 | Åland |
|---|---|---|
| Allen 83' | Report | Appel 18' |

Dalhem

25 June
17:00

| Saare County | 4–5 | Shetland |
|---|---|---|
| Pruul 28'; Laht 41'; Stern 55'; Viira 76' | Report | Aitken 4'; Bradley 28'; Maver 59'; Sinclair 71'; Flaws 72' |

Hemse

26 June
17:00

| Shetland | 0–3 | Guernsey |
|---|---|---|
| | Report | own goal ?'; Allen 43'; Gauvain 63' |

Stenkyrka

26 June
17:00

| Åland | 0–0 | Saare County |
|---|---|---|
| | Report |

Fardhem

27 June
20:00

| Guernsey | 1–1 | Saare County |
|---|---|---|
| Allen 7' | Report | Stern 9' |

Dalhem

27 June
20:00

| Åland | 2–1 | Shetland |
|---|---|---|
| Hemming 32'; Rosenberg 79' | Report | Flaws 90' |

Visby (Gutavallen)

=== Group D ===
| Rank | Nation | Pld | W | D | L | GF | GA | GD | Pts |
|---|---|---|---|---|---|---|---|---|---|
| 1 | Isle of Man | 3 | 3 | 0 | 0 | 14 | 2 | +12 | 9 |
| 2 | Ynys Môn | 3 | 2 | 0 | 1 | 8 | 5 | +3 | 6 |
| 3 | Hitra Municipality | 3 | 1 | 0 | 2 | 3 | 11 | –8 | 3 |
| 4 | Falkland Islands | 3 | 0 | 0 | 3 | 3 | 10 | –7 | 0 |

25 June
17:00

| Isle of Man | 5–0 | Hitra Municipality |
|---|---|---|
| McNulty 11', 24', 38'; Morrissey 53', 79' | Report |

Fårösund

25 June
17:00

| Ynys Môn | 3–0 | Falkland Islands |
|---|---|---|
| Owen 8', 45', 63' | Report |

Visby (Gutavallen)

26 June
17:00

| Falkland Islands | 2–5 | Isle of Man |
|---|---|---|
| Toolan 6', 68' | Report | Morrissey 5', 8', 19', 47'; Doyle 39' |

Säve

26 June
17:00

| Hitra Municipality | 1–5 | Ynys Môn |
|---|---|---|
| Athammer 76' | Report | McGivern 17'; Brookwell 35'; Owen 56', 60'; Roberts 58' |

Väskinde

27 June
17:00

| Isle of Man | 4–0 | Ynys Môn |
|---|---|---|
| Morrissey 9'; McNulty 18'; Jones 63'; Doyle 90' | Report |

Stenkyrka

27 June
17:00

| Hitra Municipality | 2–1 | Falkland Islands |
|---|---|---|
| Eide 40'; Refsnes 90' | Report | Morales 1' |

Fardhem

== Placement play-off matches ==
=== 15th place match ===
29 June
17:00

| Falkland Islands | 0–3 | Alderney |
|---|---|---|
| | Report | Jacob Olliver 46'; Jermaine Parry 51'; Ross Benfield 90' |

Säve

=== 13th place match ===
29 June
17:00

| Saare County | 4–2 | Frøya |
|---|---|---|
| Suursaar 32', 49'; Laht 55'; Paju 90' | Report | Kristiansen 58' own goal ?' |

Fardhem

=== 11th place match ===
29 June
17:00

| Hitra Municipality | 1–1 | Western Isles |
|---|---|---|
| Kvakland 20' | Report | Maciver 47' |
Penalties
| | 3–5 |

Stenkyrka

=== 9th place match ===
29 June
17:00

| Orkney | 3–1 | Shetland |
|---|---|---|
| C. Hellewell 66', 72'; S. Hellewell 90' | Report | Maver 65' |

Dalhem

=== 7th place match ===
29 June
17:00

| Ynys Môn | 0–2 | Åland |
|---|---|---|
| | Report | Blomqvist 73'; Nordström 88' |

Fårösund

=== 5th place match ===
29 June
20:45

| Jersey | 3–2 | Gotland |
|---|---|---|
| Lester 47', 56'; Le Quesne 82' | Report | Dahlström 51'; Eneqvist 66' |

Visby (Gutavallen)

== Final Stage ==
=== Bracket ===
Semi-finals
29 June – Väskinde
Greenland | 1 (3)
Menorca | 1 (1)
29 June – Fardhem
Guernsey | 3
Isle of Man | 4

Final
30 June – Visby (Gutavallen)
Greenland | 0
Isle of Man | 6
Third place
30 June – Väskinde
Guernsey | 1
Menorca | 0

==== Semi-finals ====
29 June
13:00

| Greenland | 1–1 (a.e.t.) | Menorca |
|---|---|---|
| Malik Juhl ?' | Report | Mercadal 25' |
Penalties
| | 3–1 |

Väskinde

29 June
13:00

| Guernsey | 3–4 | Isle of Man |
|---|---|---|
| Loaring 25', 48'; Fallaize 67' | Report | Bell 45'; McNulty 46'; Simpson 65'; Morrissey 90' |

Fardhem

==== Third place match ====
30 June
12:30

| Menorca | 0–1 | Guernsey |
|---|---|---|
| | Report | Loaring 28' |

Väskinde

==== Final ====
30 June
13:00

| Greenland | 0–6 | Isle of Man |
|---|---|---|
| | Report | Simpson 24', 36'; Jones 58'; McNulty 80'; Doyle 83', 86' |

Visby (Gutavallen)
Referee: Adam Ladebäck

2017 Island Games Winners
Isle of Man
First Title

== Final rankings ==
| Rank | Team |
|---|---|
| Gold medal | Isle of Man |
| Silver medal | Greenland |
| Bronze medal | Guernsey |
| 4 | Menorca |
| 5 | Jersey |
| 6 | Gotland |
| 7 | Åland |
| 8 | Ynys Môn |
| 9 | Orkney |
| 10 | Shetland |
| 11 | Western Isles |
| 12 | Hitra Municipality |
| 13 | Saare County |
| 14 | Frøya |
| 15 | Alderney |
| 16 | Falkland Islands |

== See also ==
- Women's Football at the 2017 Island Games
