= Falkland Islands national football team =

Falkland Islands
- Nickname: Stanley / The Warrahs
- Association: Falkland Islands Football League
- Head coach: Daniel Biggs
- FIFA code: FIS
First colours	Second colours

First international
- Isle of Man 9–1 Falkland Islands (Douglas, Isle of Man; 8 July 2001)

Biggest win
- Falkland Islands 6–0 Frøya (Hamilton, Bermuda; 18 July 2013)

Biggest defeat
- Guernsey 12–0 Falkland Islands (Douglas, Isle of Man; 9 July 2001)

Island Games
- Appearances: 8 (first in 2001)
- Best result: Third place (2013)

The Falkland Islands national football team is a representative football team of the Falkland Islands, organised by the Falkland Islands Football League. The Falkland Islands Football League does not belong to CONMEBOL, as its member countries support Argentina in the sovereignty conflict, and therefore neither can it be a member of FIFA. Thus, the team is not eligible to play in official competitions such as the World Cup and the Copa América. The team has played in the Island Games in 2001, 2005, 2009, 2011, 2013, 2015, 2017 and 2023. In 2013 the team enjoyed a record win and a 3rd place medal.

After two years with no League football it was decided that the Falkland Islands Football League (FIFL) would be completely revamped, a Constitution was drawn up and Committee members were put forward and accepted. After the Constitution was passed by interested players, a new league was organised with four teams, with players being picked by each of the team's captains. On 9 November the opening league fixtures were played.

At the same time, the Falkland Islands National team appointed manager Jimmy Curtis to lead the team at the 2009 Island Games in Åland. A squad of over 23 players was picked and training began in September 2008. The long distance needed to travel, the expensive cost to travel on RAF and LAN flights and the need to take between 16–18 players usually prevents the Football team from attending the Island Games more often than every four years. Due to the remoteness of the islands and the small population, the Stanley team can only play military teams or visiting warships.

The Falkland Islands football team competed at the 2017 Island Games held between 24 and 30 June in Gotland. This was the seventh time the Falkland Islands had competed in the Island Games. They were drawn in Group D with the Isle of Man, Ynys Môn and Hitra. After losing all three group matches they played Alderney in the 15th place play off, losing 3–0.

== List of matches played ==
Date	Venue	Opponent	Score
Jul 13, 2023	Guernsey	Åland	1–1
Jul 11, 2023	Guernsey	Shetland	1–4
Jul 10, 2023	Guernsey	Ynys Môn	1–5
Jul 9, 2023	Guernsey	Isle of Man	0–3
Jul 3, 2023	Reigate, UK	Chagos Islands	0–4
Nov 11, 2018	Falkland Islands	FA England Representative Team	1–3
Jun 29, 2017	Gotland	Alderney	0–3
Jun 27, 2017	Gotland	Hitra Municipality	1–2
Jun 26, 2017	Gotland	Isle of Man	2–5
Jun 25, 2017	Gotland	Ynys Môn	0–3
Jul 2, 2015	Jersey	Western Isles	1–2
Jun 30, 2015	Jersey	Shetland	0–5
Jun 29, 2015	Jersey	Isle of Wight	0–3
Jun 28, 2015	Jersey	Hitra Municipality	1–2
Jul 18, 2013	Bermuda	Frøya	6–0
Jul 17, 2013	Bermuda	Greenland	0–9
Jul 15, 2013	Bermuda	Bermuda	0–8
Jul 14, 2013	Bermuda	Frøya	2–1
Jun 30, 2011	Isle of Wight	Alderney	3–0
Jun 28, 2011	Isle of Wight	Gotland	1–6
Jun 27, 2011	Isle of Wight	Isle of Man	0–6
Jun 26, 2011	Isle of Wight	Guernsey	0–5
Jul 2, 2009	Åland Islands	Frøya	1–3
Jun 30, 2009	Åland Islands	Western Isles	1–7
Jun 29, 2009	Åland Islands	Gotland	0–2
Jun 28, 2009	Åland Islands	Isle of Man	1–2
Jul 15, 2005	Shetland	Orkney	0–2
Jul 14, 2005	Shetland	Åland	1–2
Jul 13, 2005	Shetland	Isle of Man	0–9
Jul 12, 2005	Shetland	Saare County	2–1
Jul 10, 2005	Shetland	Shetland	0–4
Jul 13, 2001	Isle of Man	Orkney	4–1
Jul 12, 2001	Isle of Man	Greenland	0–4
Jul 9, 2001	Isle of Man	Guernsey	0–12
Jul 8, 2001	Isle of Man	Isle of Man	1–9

== Tournament records ==
=== Island Games ===
Island Games record
Year	Round	Position	GP	W	D	L	GS	GA
(Faroe Islands) 1989	Did not enter							
(Åland) 1991	Did not enter							
(Isle of Wight) 1993	Did not enter							
(Gibraltar) 1995	Did not enter							
(Jersey) 1997	Did not enter							
(Gotland) 1999	Did not enter							
(Isle of Man) 2001	Group stage	11th	4	1	0	3	5	26
(Guernsey) 2003	Did not enter							
(Shetland) 2005	Group stage	10th	5	1	0	4	3	18
(Rhodes) 2007	Did not enter							
(Åland) 2009	Group stage	16th	4	0	0	4	3	14
(Isle of Wight) 2011	Group stage	13th	4	1	0	3	4	17
(Bermuda) 2013	Third place	3rd	4	2	0	2	8	18
(Jersey) 2015	Group stage	12th	4	1	0	3	3	11
(Gotland) 2017	Group stage	16th	4	0	0	4	3	13
(Gibraltar) 2019 (Note: Not held football tournament (Replaced by 2019 Inter Games Football Tournament in Anglesey).)	Did not enter							
(Guernsey) 2023	Group stage	14th	4	0	1	3	3	13
(Orkney) 2025	Did not enter							
Total	Third place	8/17	33	6	1	26	35	130

== Historical kits ==
2005 Home	2009 Home	2009 Away	2011 Home	2011 Away	2013 Home	2013 Away	2015 Home

2015 Away	2017 Home	2017 Away	2018 Home	2020 Home	2020 Away	2023 Home	2023 Away

== Honours ==
=== Non-FIFA competitions ===
- Island Games
  - Bronze medal (1): 2013
