= Bermuda women's national football team =

Women's national association football team representing Bermuda

Bermuda
- Association: Bermuda Football Association
- Confederation: CONCACAF
- Head coach: Naquita Robinson
- Home stadium: Bermuda National Stadium
- FIFA code: BER
First colours	Second colours

FIFA ranking
- Current: 142 ▼1 (16 June 2026)
- Highest: 105 (March 2009)
- Lowest: 148 (August 2022 – March 2023)

First international
- Bermuda 3–0 Bahamas (Hamilton, Bermuda; 23 April 2000)

Biggest win
- Bermuda 8–0 Dominica (St. John's, Antigua and Barbuda; 5 March 2007)

Biggest defeat
- Jamaica 9–1 Bermuda (Couva, Trinidad and Tobago; 21 August 2014); Bermuda 0–8 Costa Rica (Hamilton, Bermuda; 3 March 2026)

The Bermuda women's national football team is the national women's football team of Bermuda and is overseen by the Bermuda Football Association.

The first tournament that Bermuda was involved were in the 2005 Island Games held in Shetland, Scotland in where they won 5–0 to the host, also with Guernsey by 8–0 and lost 3–0 against the Faroe Islands, 1–0 with Åland and 2–1 against the Isle of Man, but even so they stayed with the bronze.

Its second tournament were the 2007 Island Games where they stayed with the bronze again.

Its third appearance was in the 2013 Island Games, where they played against Greenland and Hitra, beating them 5–1 and 6–1 in the group phase. It finally tied 0–0 against Greenland in the final, but it won 5–4 in penalties and stayed with the gold of that edition.

== Results and fixtures ==
The following is a list of match results in the last 12 months, as well as any future matches that have been scheduled.

Legend

Win Draw Lose Fixture

=== 2025 ===
27 November 2025 2026 CONCACAF W Championship Q	Cayman Islands	0–4	Bermuda	George Town
19:00 UTC−5		Report (FIFA); Report (CONCACAF)	Frazzoni 2'; Thompson 13'; Masters 40'; Christopher 68'	Stadium: Truman Bodden Sports Complex; Referee: Crystal Sobers (Trinidad and Tobago)

1 December 2025 2026 CONCACAF W Championship Q	Guatemala	4–1	Bermuda	Guatemala City
19:00 UTC−6	Monterroso 5', 61'; Polanco 15'; Martínez 77' (pen.)	Report (FIFA); Report (CONCACAF)	Frazzoni 78'	Stadium: Estadio Cementos Progreso

== Players ==
=== Current squad ===
- The following is the squad called up for the 2026 CONCACAF W Qualifiers against Cayman Islands on 27 November 2025 and Guatemala on 1 December 2025.*

Caps and goals are correct as of 1 December 2025, after the match against Guatemala.

No.	Pos.	Player	Date of birth (age)	Caps	Goals	Club
	GK	Taya Rodrigues				
	GK	Sharifa Crockwell				
	DF	Sierra Fisher	31 March 1996 (age 30)	1	0	(Bermuda Football Association) Somerset CC
	DF	Victoria Davis	6 March 1999 (age 27)	8	1	(Bermuda Football Association) SCC Lady Trojans
	DF	Zemira Webb	21 July 2004 (age 22)	1	0	(United States Soccer Federation) New Mexico Lobos
	DF	Danni Watson	28 March 2003 (age 23)	2	0	(United States Soccer Federation) Barton Bulldogs
	DF	Saony Trott				(Bermuda Football Association) Dandy Stars
	DF	Marley Christian	28 November 2000 (age 25)	6	0	(United States Soccer Federation) Boston Sidekicks
	DF	Keunna Dill	31 October 1995 (age 30)	8	1	(The Football Association) FC United of Manchester
	DF	Koa Goodchild	29 January 2003 (age 23)	3	0	(United States Soccer Federation) Howard Bison
	MF	Jya Ratteray-Smith	2 July 2002 (age 24)	3	0	(Bermuda Football Association) SCC Lady Trojans
	MF	Khyla Brangman	27 November 1994 (age 31)	8	1	(Bermuda Football Association) PHC Lady Zebras
	MF	Evans Welch				
	MF	Marli Butterfield				(United States Soccer Federation) Delaware State Hornets
	MF	K’Shaela Burch-Waldron		6	0	(The Football Association) Sutton United F.C.
	MF	Eva Frazzoni (captain)	10 February 1998 (age 28)	8	0	(The Football Association) A.F.C. Sudbury
	FW	Jahni Simmons	24 August 2005 (age 21)			(Bermuda Football Association) Dandy Stars
	FW	Nia Christopher	2 May 2001 (age 25)	7	6	(United States Soccer Federation) Fort Lauderdale United FC
	FW	Kenni Thompson	1 December 2000 (age 25)		0	(The Football Association) A.F.C Bournemouth
	FW	Amiya James				
	FW	Robin Valana Pearman				
	FW	Jaden Masters	14 January 2003 (age 23)	1		(United States Soccer Federation) Louisiana–Monroe Warhawks

=== Recent call ups ===
Pos.	Player	Date of birth (age)	Caps	Goals	Club	Latest call-up

== Competitive record ==
=== FIFA Women's World Cup ===
FIFA Women's World Cup record
Year	Result	GP	W	D*	L	GF	GA	GD
(China) 1991 to (United States) 1999	Did not exist							
(United States) 2003	Did not enter							
(China) 2007	Did not qualify							
(Germany) 2011	Did not enter							
(Canada) 2015	Did not qualify							
(France) 2019	Did not qualify							
(Australia) (New Zealand) 2023	Did not qualify							
(Brazil) 2027	Did not qualify							
(Costa Rica) (Jamaica) (Mexico) (United States) 2031	To be determined							
(United Kingdom) 2035	To be determined							
Total	–	–	–	–	–	–	–	–

*Draws include knockout matches decided on penalty kicks.

=== Olympic Games ===
Summer Olympics record									Qualifying record					
Year	Round	Position	Pld	W	D*	L	GF	GA	Pld	W	D*	L	GF	GA
(United States) 1996	Did not exist								1995 FIFA WWC					
(Australia) 2000	Did not exist								1999 FIFA WWC					
(Greece) 2004	Did not enter								Did not enter					
(China) 2008	Did not qualify								3	2	0	1	12	4
(United Kingdom) 2012	Did not qualify								3	1	0	2	6	6
(Brazil) 2016	Did not enter								Did not enter					
(Japan) 2020	Did not enter								Did not enter					
(France) 2024	Did not qualify								2022 CONCACAF W Championship					
(United States) 2028	Did not qualify								2026 CONCACAF W Championship					
Total	–	–	–	–	–	–	–	–	6	3	0	3	18	10

*Draws include knockout matches decided on penalty kicks.

=== CONCACAF W Championship ===
CONCACAF W Championship record									Qualification record						
Year	Result	GP	W	D*	L	GF	GA	GD	GP	W	D*	L	GF	GA	GD
(Haiti) 1991 to (United States) 2000	Did not exist								Did not exist						
(Canada) (United States) 2002	Did not enter								Did not enter						
(United States) 2006	Did not qualify								5	2	0	3	9	16	−7
(Mexico) 2010	Did not enter								Did not enter						
(United States) 2014	Did not qualify								2014 Caribbean Cup						
(United States) 2018	Did not qualify								7	3	1	3	11	13	−2
(Mexico) 2022	Did not qualify								4	2	0	2	12	5	-7
(United States) 2026	Did not qualify								4	2	0	2	10	15	−5
Total	–	–	–	–	–	–	–	–	16	7	1	8	30	44	−14

*Draws include knockout matches decided on penalty kicks.

=== CONCACAF W Gold Cup ===
CONCACAF W Gold Cup record								Qualification record							
Year	Result	GP	W	D*	L	GF	GA	Division	Group	GP	W	D*	L	GF	GA
(United States) 2024	Did not qualify							B	C	6	4	1	1	14	5
(N/A) 2029	To be determined							To be determined							
Total	–	–	–	–	–	–	–	–	–	6	4	1	1	14	5

*Draws include knockout matches decided on penalty kicks.

=== CFU Women's Caribbean Cup ===
CFU Women's Caribbean Cup record
Year	Result	Pld	W	D*	L	GF	GA
(Haiti) 2000	Group stage	4	2	0	2	10	7
(Trinidad and Tobago) 2014	Group stage	6	2	1	3	13	22
2018	Did not enter						
Total	Group stage	10	4	1	5	23	29

*Draws include knockout matches decided on penalty kicks.

=== Island Games ===
Island Games record
Year	Result	GP	W	D*	L	GF	GA	GD
(Isle of Man) 2001	Did not enter							
(Guernsey) 2003	Did not enter							
(Shetland) 2005	Bronze Medal	5	2	0	3	14	6	+8
(Greece) 2007	Bronze Medal	4	2	1	1	7	8	-1
(Åland) 2009	Did not enter							
(Isle of Wight) 2011	Did not enter							
(Bermuda) 2013	Gold Medal	3	2	1	0	11	2	+9
(Jersey) 2015	Did not enter							
(Gotland) 2017	Did not enter							
(Guernsey) 2023	To be determined							
Total	Gold Medal	12	6	2	4	32	16	+16

*Draws include knockout matches decided on penalty kicks.

== See also ==
- Sport in Bermuda
  - Football in Bermuda
    - Women's football in Bermuda
- Bermuda men's national football team
