= Martyn Clarke =

British footballer (1980–2022)

Personal information
- Full name: Martyn Gilson-Clarke
- Date of birth: 27 April 1980
- Place of birth: Plymouth, United Kingdom
- Date of death: 14 December 2022 (aged 42)
- Place of death: Gloucester, United Kingdom
- Height: 1.83 m (6 ft 0 in)
- Positions: Defender; forward

Youth career
- –1998: Globe Tavern

Senior career*
| Years | Team | Apps | (Gls) |
| 1999 | Globe Tavern | | |
| 2001 | Connecticut Wolves | | |
| 2002–2004 | Brentwood Town | | |

International career
| 2005–2015 | Falkland Islands | 16 | (3) |
Medal record
Men's football
Representing Falkland Islands
Island Games
| Bronze medal – third place | 2013 Bermuda |
- * Club domestic league appearances and goals

Martyn Gilson-Clarke (27 April 1980 – 14 December 2022) was a footballer who played as a striker. Born in England, he was a Falkland Islands international.

== Club career ==
In 1999, Clarke trained with Argentine side Boca, and after recovery from an injury, with El Porvenir and Defensores de Belgrano. He eventually left the Falklands to try out with an English National League or a Third Division team. Clarke played two seasons (2002-2004) with Brentwood Town FC.

== International career ==
Clarke represented the Falkland Islands official team.

== Personal life ==
Gilson-Clarke was the son of a Royal Marine who fought in the Falklands War. He was married to a Filipino woman and had a young daughter. During the 2020s, he developed his own logistics business: MGCCourier. Gilson-Clarke's body was found in his flat in Gloucester on 14 December 2022, after apparently taking his own life. An inquest reported that the individual left notes indicating an intent to die by suicide. No family or friends attended the hearing at the Gloucestershire Coroner's Court, and no details regarding his personal background, career, or family were provided.
