= Guernsey official football team =

Official association football team representing Guernsey

Guernsey
- Nickname: Donkeys
- Association: Guernsey Football Association
- Head coach: Stephen Sharman
- Home stadium: The Track; Footes Lane; Corbet Field; Victoria Park
- FIFA code: GGY
First colours

First international
- Guernsey 6–0 Alderney (Saint Peter Port, Guernsey; 17 April 1905)

Biggest win
- Guernsey 12–0 Alderney (Saint Peter Port, Guernsey; 1 April 1978); Guernsey 12–0 Falkland Islands (Douglas, Isle of Man; 9 July 2001)

Biggest defeat
- Jersey 7–0 Guernsey (Saint Helier, Jersey; 11 April 1946)

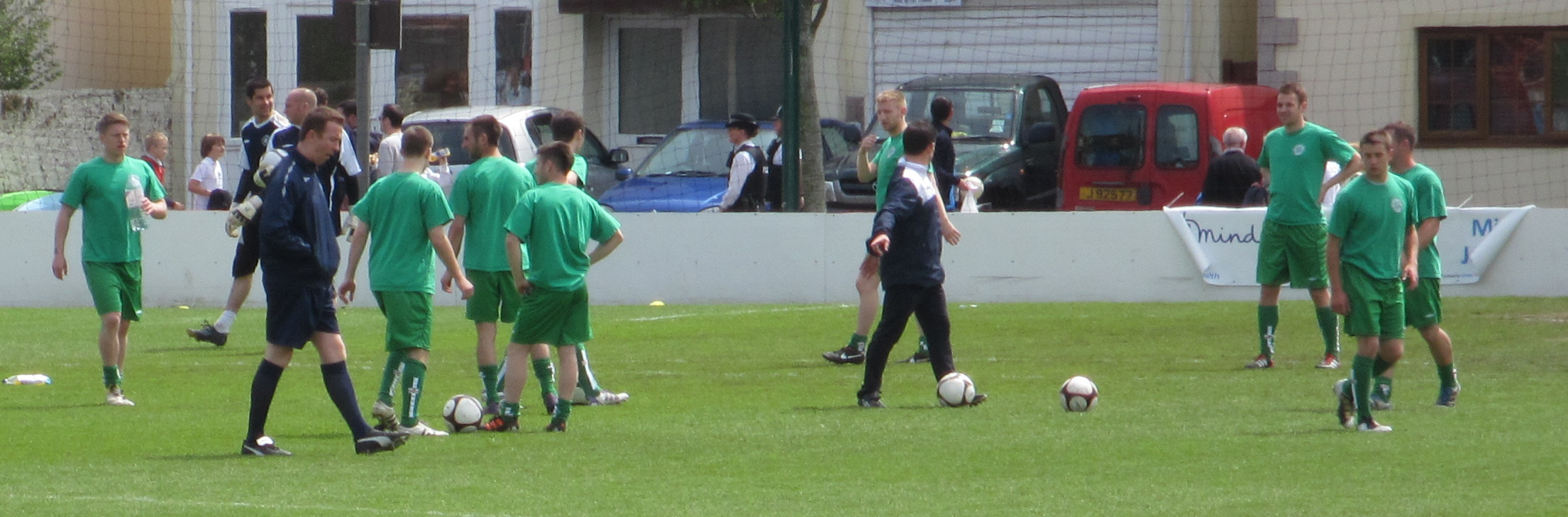
Guernsey team at the 2012 Muratti Vase final.

The Guernsey official football team is the official football team representing the island of Guernsey (which is not part of the United Kingdom, but is a Crown dependency) in non-FIFA international football matches. It is not affiliated with FIFA or UEFA, and therefore cannot compete for the FIFA World Cup or UEFA European Football Championship.

Players from Guernsey are however known to be eligible for all four Home Nations national teams (England, Scotland, Wales, and Northern Ireland) in those competitions. Matt Le Tissier and Maya Le Tissier both chose England among those options.

== Men's team ==
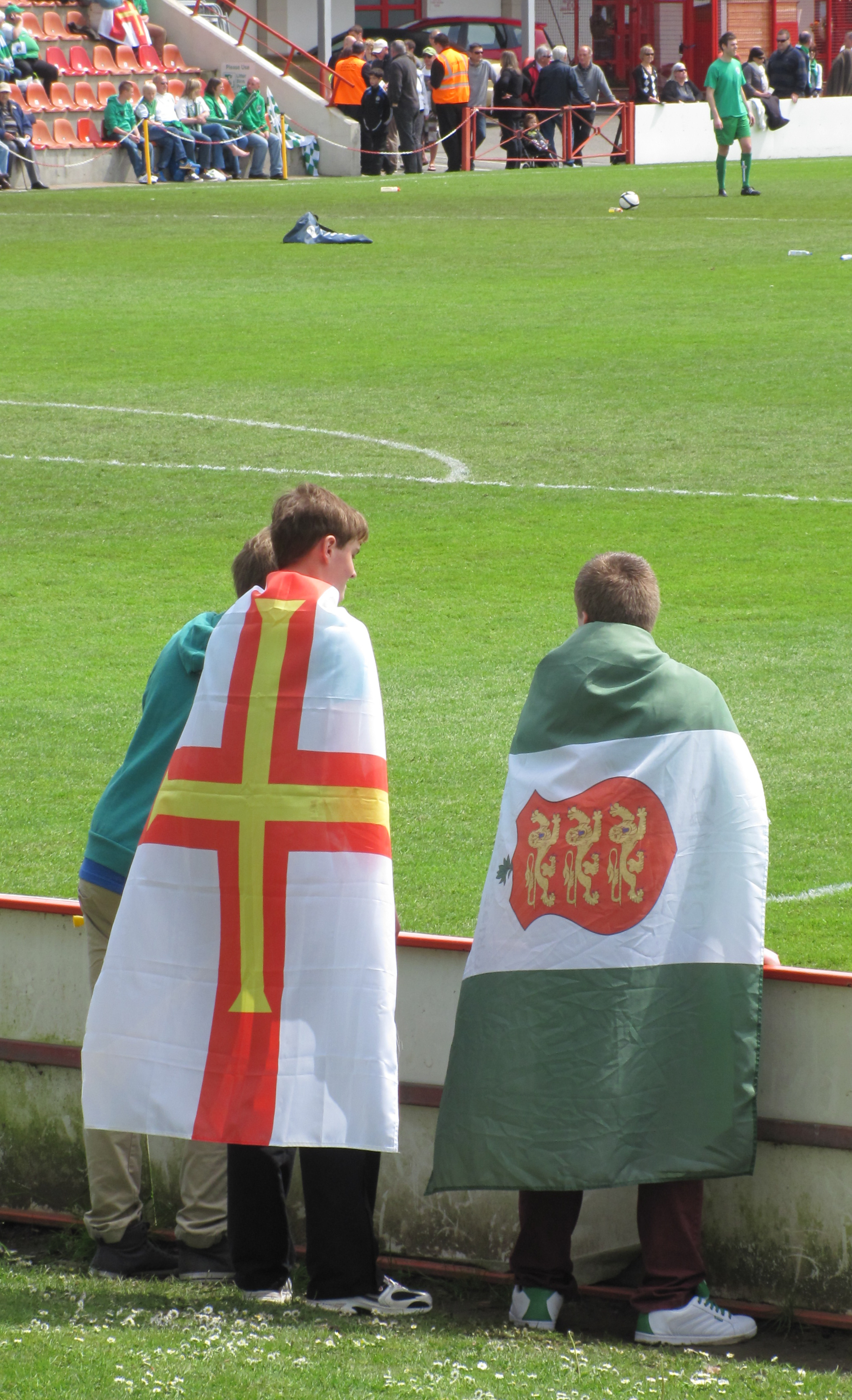
Guernsey supporters at the 2012 Muratti Vase final.

Since 1905, they have competed with Alderney and Jersey for the Muratti Vase, winning it 47 times, most recently in 2025. The players are selected from the Guernsey leagues, with the top Division being the FNB Priaulx League.

Guernsey Football went under a transformation at the start of the 2011–12 season when Guernsey F.C. was created, which led to the vast majority of the top Island players competing in the English non-league pyramid system for the first time.

The official team is coached by Chris Tardif who was appointed in 2017.

Guernsey also competes in Football at the Island Games. A technically separate team representing the Priaulx League competes in the FA Inter-League Cup, winning the latter in the 2009–10 season, and qualifying for the 2011 UEFA Regions' Cup.

=== Managers ===
Name	Périod
(Guernsey) Colin Fallaize	1993–1997
(Guernsey) Phil Corbet	1997–2003
(Guernsey) Colin Fallaize	2003 (one match)
(Guernsey) Steve Ogier	2003–2009
(Guernsey) Tony Vance	2009–2012
(Guernsey) Kevin Graham	2012–2013
(Guernsey) Steve Sharman	2013–2017
(Guernsey) Chris Tardif	2017–present

=== Competitive record ===
- Last game: Guernsey 1–0 Gozo

(Last update: 17 May 2026)

Opponents	Pld	W	D	L	GF	GA	Win%
Åland	3	1	1	1	6	5	33.33
Alderney	141	140	0	1	255	23	99.29
Cornwall	3	1	1	1	4	8	33.33
Falkland Islands	1	1	0	0	3	0	100.00
Frøya	3	3	0	0	15	2	100.00
Gibraltar	3	2	1	0	6	1	66.67
Gotland	1	1	0	0	3	0	100.00
Greenland	2	1	1	0	6	0	50.00
Gozo	1	1	0	0	1	0	100.00
Isle of Man	4	4	0	0	14	3	100.00
Isle of Wight	6	2	2	2	10	10	33.33
Jersey	115	48	12	55	193	215	41.74
Menorca	1	1	0	0	2	1	100.00
Orkney	2	2	0	0	13	0	100.00
Rhodes	2	1	1	0	2	1	50.00
Saint Helena	1	1	0	0	9	0	100.00
Shetland	4	2	0	2	9	10	50.00
Western Isles	2	2	0	0	3	1	100.00
Ynys Môn	8	4	2	2	16	8	50.00
Total	300	215	21	64	565	286	71.67

==== Island Games ====
1989	1991	1993	1995	1997	1999	2001	2003	2005	2007	2009	2011	2013	2015	2017	2019^{1}	2023	2025
dne	6th	dne	5th	4th	9th	1st	1st	2nd	dne	3rd	2nd	dne	1st	3rd	2nd	5th	wd

- Blue square indicates host
- dne – did not enter
- wd – withdrew after entering

^{1}Due to Gibraltar not having enough pitches there was no football at the 2019 games. In its place the 2019 Inter Games Football Tournament were held.

=== Honours ===
- Island Games: 3

2001, 2003, 2015

- Muratti Vase: 47

Wins since 2000:

2001, 2005, 2010, 2012, 2013, 2014, 2017, 2025, 2026

== Players ==
=== Current squad ===
The following 20 players were named in the squad for the Muratti Vase final on 16 May 2026.

No.	Pos.	Player	Date of birth (age)	Caps	Goals	Club
1	GK	Josh Addison	17 September 1995 (age 30)			(Guernsey Football Association) Guernsey F.C.
13	GK	Jordan Kelly	5 December 1998 (age 27)			(Guernsey Football Association) Guernsey F.C.
3	DF	Jamie Dodd	24 February 1989 (age 37)			(Guernsey Football Association) Guernsey F.C.
5	DF	Tom Vaudin	21 November 2000 (age 25)			(Guernsey Football Association) Guernsey F.C.
21	DF	Jacques Cauvin				(Guernsey Football Association) Guernsey F.C.
	DF	George Mason				(Guernsey Football Association) St. Martins A.C.
15	DF	Ben Solway	17 August 1999 (age 26)			(Guernsey Football Association) Guernsey F.C.
7	MF	Charlton Gauvain	6 November 2000 (age 25)			(Guernsey Football Association) Guernsey F.C.
8	MF	Matt Loaring	11 December 1990 (age 35)			(Guernsey Football Association) Guernsey F.C.
14	MF	Simon Arnold				(Guernsey Football Association) Guernsey F.C.
2	MF	Niall Hainsworth				(Guernsey Football Association) Guernsey F.C.
12	MF	Fin du Port	19 December 2004 (age 21)			(Guernsey Football Association) Guernsey F.C.
6	MF	Seb Vance	17 October 2003 (age 22)			(Guernsey Football Association) Guernsey F.C.
18	MF	Gil Hunter				(United States Soccer Federation) Carroll Fighting Saints football
	MF	Archie Drillot				(Guernsey Football Association) Northerners A.C.
10	FW	Ross Allen	2 March 1987 (age 39)			(Guernsey Football Association) Guernsey F.C.
19	FW	Will Fazakerley	19 June 1998 (age 28)			(Guernsey Football Association) Guernsey F.C.
11	FW	Brandon Wallace				(Guernsey Football Association) Guernsey F.C.
17	FW	Callum Le Lacheur				(Guernsey Football Association) Guernsey F.C.
	FW	Fin Patterson				(Guernsey Football Association) Guernsey F.C.

== Men's U-16 team ==
Guernsey's under 16 have competed in their own Muratti Cup since 2007. In 2018, female player Maya Le Tissier made her debut for the Guernsey team, being the first female player to play for the team, with the Guernsey women's team being disbanded the year previous.

=== Honours ===
- U-16 Muratti Cup: 2011, 2012, 2013, 2015 (shared), 2017, 2025

== Women's team ==
The team is made up from players in the four local teams of women's football, Vale Rec, Rangers, Rovers and Sylvans. A women's team has competed annually against Jersey in the Muratti tournament since 1997. Won: 6 Drawn: 0 Lost: 13 Guernsey Women have competed in the Island Games since 2001. The best result was 4th place in 2003.

In 2016, Ormer FC was created to allow Guernsey Women to compete in UK competitions, it is affiliated to the Hampshire Football Association. This was followed by GFA announcing they would create an alternative Women's team to do something similar. These changes led to the 2017 Ladies Muratti being cancelled following disputes.

=== Island Games ===
2001	2003	2005	2007	2009	2011	2013	2015	2017	2019^{1}	2023	2025
6th	4th	5th	7th	8th	dne	dne	8th	dne	dne	10th	wd

- Blue square indicates host
- dne – did not enter
- wd – withdrew after entering

^{1}Due to Gibraltar not having enough pitches there was no football at the 2019 games. In its place the 2019 Inter Games Football Tournament were held.

=== Honours ===
- Muratti Cup: 1997, 1998, 1999, 2000, 2001, 2008, 2024, 2025

== See also ==
- Guernsey Football Association
- Guernsey F.C.
- Island Games
- Football at the Island Games
- Muratti
