= List of FIFA country codes =

FIFA assigns a three-letter country code to each of its member and non-member countries. These are the official codes used by FIFA and its continental confederations (AFC, CAF, CONCACAF, CONMEBOL, OFC and UEFA) as name abbreviations of countries and dependent areas, in official competitions.

== FIFA member codes ==
There are currently 211 FIFA members, each with its own unique country code:

| Country | Code |
|---|---|
| Afghanistan | AFG |
| Albania | ALB |
| Algeria | ALG |
| American Samoa | ASA |
| Andorra | AND |
| Angola | ANG |
| Anguilla | AIA |
| Antigua and Barbuda | ATG |
| Argentina | ARG |
| Armenia | ARM |
| Aruba | ARU |
| Australia | AUS |
| Austria | AUT |
| Azerbaijan | AZE |
| Bahamas | BAH |
| Bahrain | BHR |
| Bangladesh | BAN |
| Barbados | BRB |
| Belarus | BLR |
| Belgium | BEL |
| Belize | BLZ |
| Benin | BEN |
| Bermuda | BER |
| Bhutan | BHU |
| Bolivia | BOL |
| Bosnia and Herzegovina | BIH |
| Botswana | BOT |
| Brazil | BRA |
| British Virgin Islands | VGB |
| Brunei | BRU |
| Bulgaria | BUL |
| Burkina Faso | BFA |
| Burundi | BDI |
| Cambodia | CAM |
| Cameroon | CMR |
| Canada | CAN |
| Cape Verde | CPV |
| Cayman Islands | CAY |
| Central African Republic | CTA |
| Chad | CHA |
| Chile | CHI |
| China | CHN |
| Chinese Taipei | TPE |
| Colombia | COL |
| Comoros | COM |
| Congo | CGO |
| Cook Islands | COK |
| Costa Rica | CRC |
| Croatia | CRO |
| Cuba | CUB |
| Curaçao | CUW |
| Cyprus | CYP |
| Czech Republic | CZE |

| Country | Code |
|---|---|
| Denmark | DEN |
| Djibouti | DJI |
| Dominica | DMA |
| Dominican Republic | DOM |
| DR Congo | COD |
| Ecuador | ECU |
| Egypt | EGY |
| El Salvador | SLV |
| England | ENG |
| Equatorial Guinea | EQG |
| Eritrea | ERI |
| Estonia | EST |
| Eswatini | SWZ |
| Ethiopia | ETH |
| Faroe Islands | FRO |
| Fiji | FIJ |
| Finland | FIN |
| France | FRA |
| Gabon | GAB |
| Gambia | GAM |
| Georgia | GEO |
| Germany | GER |
| Ghana | GHA |
| Gibraltar | GIB |
| Greece | GRE |
| Grenada | GRN |
| Guam | GUM |
| Guatemala | GUA |
| Guinea | GUI |
| Guinea-Bissau | GNB |
| Guyana | GUY |
| Haiti | HAI |
| Honduras | HON |
| Hong Kong | HKG |
| Hungary | HUN |
| Iceland | ISL |
| India | IND |
| Indonesia | IDN |
| Iran | IRN |
| Iraq | IRQ |
| Israel | ISR |
| Italy | ITA |
| Ivory Coast | CIV |
| Jamaica | JAM |
| Japan | JPN |
| Jordan | JOR |
| Kazakhstan | KAZ |
| Kenya | KEN |
| Kosovo | KOS |
| Kuwait | KUW |
| Kyrgyzstan | KGZ |
| Laos | LAO |
| Latvia | LVA |

| Country | Code |
|---|---|
| Lebanon | LBN |
| Lesotho | LES |
| Liberia | LBR |
| Libya | LBY |
| Liechtenstein | LIE |
| Lithuania | LTU |
| Luxembourg | LUX |
| Macau | MAC |
| Madagascar | MAD |
| Malawi | MWI |
| Malaysia | MAS |
| Maldives | MDV |
| Mali | MLI |
| Malta | MLT |
| Mauritania | MTN |
| Mauritius | MRI |
| Mexico | MEX |
| Moldova | MDA |
| Mongolia | MNG |
| Montenegro | MNE |
| Montserrat | MSR |
| Morocco | MAR |
| Mozambique | MOZ |
| Myanmar | MYA |
| Namibia | NAM |
| Nepal | NEP |
| Netherlands | NED |
| New Caledonia | NCL |
| New Zealand | NZL |
| Nicaragua | NCA |
| Niger | NIG |
| Nigeria | NGA |
| North Korea | PRK |
| North Macedonia | MKD |
| Northern Ireland | NIR |
| Norway | NOR |
| Oman | OMA |
| Pakistan | PAK |
| Palestine | PLE |
| Panama | PAN |
| Papua New Guinea | PNG |
| Paraguay | PAR |
| Peru | PER |
| Philippines | PHI |
| Poland | POL |
| Portugal | POR |
| Puerto Rico | PUR |
| Qatar | QAT |
| Republic of Ireland | IRL |
| Romania | ROU |
| Russia | RUS |
| Rwanda | RWA |
| Saint Kitts and Nevis | SKN |

| Country | Code |
|---|---|
| Saint Lucia | LCA |
| Saint Vincent and the Grenadines | VIN |
| Samoa | SAM |
| San Marino | SMR |
| São Tomé and Príncipe | STP |
| Saudi Arabia | KSA |
| Scotland | SCO |
| Senegal | SEN |
| Serbia | SRB |
| Seychelles | SEY |
| Sierra Leone | SLE |
| Singapore | SGP |
| Slovakia | SVK |
| Slovenia | SVN |
| Solomon Islands | SOL |
| Somalia | SOM |
| South Africa | RSA |
| South Korea | KOR |
| South Sudan | SSD |
| Spain | ESP |
| Sri Lanka | SRI |
| Sudan | SDN |
| Suriname | SUR |
| Sweden | SWE |
| Switzerland | SUI |
| Syria | SYR |
| Tahiti | TAH |
| Tajikistan | TJK |
| Tanzania | TAN |
| Thailand | THA |
| Timor-Leste | TLS |
| Togo | TOG |
| Tonga | TGA |
| Trinidad and Tobago | TRI |
| Tunisia | TUN |
| Turkey | TUR |
| Turkmenistan | TKM |
| Turks and Caicos Islands | TCA |
| Uganda | UGA |
| Ukraine | UKR |
| United Arab Emirates | UAE |
| United States | USA |
| Uruguay | URU |
| U.S. Virgin Islands | VIR |
| Uzbekistan | UZB |
| Vanuatu | VAN |
| Venezuela | VEN |
| Vietnam | VIE |
| Wales | WAL |
| Yemen | YEM |
| Zambia | ZAM |
| Zimbabwe | ZIM |

== Non-FIFA member codes ==
The following codes refer to countries or dependent territories that are currently not affiliated with FIFA, but whose codes either appear in the FIFA results database, or are used regularly by confederation websites:

| Country | Code | Confederation |
|---|---|---|
| Bonaire | BES | CONCACAF |
| Bonaire | BOE | CONCACAF |
| French Guiana | GUF | CONCACAF |
| Guadeloupe | GLP | CONCACAF |
| Kiribati | KIR | OFC |
| Martinique | MTQ | CONCACAF |
| Niue | NIU | OFC |
| Northern Mariana Islands | MNP | AFC |
| Northern Mariana Islands | NMI | AFC |
| Réunion | REU | CAF |
| Saint Martin | MAF | CONCACAF |
| Saint Martin | SMN | CONCACAF |
| Sint Maarten | SXM | CONCACAF |
| Sint Maarten | SMA | CONCACAF |
| Tuvalu | TUV | OFC |
| Zanzibar | ZAN | CAF |

== Irregular codes ==
The following codes refer to countries or dependent areas that are currently not affiliated with FIFA. Even though they are members or associate members of their regional confederations, these codes are not regularly used.

=== Sovereign states ===
| Country | Code |
|---|---|
| Great Britain | GBR |
| Marshall Islands | MHL |
| Federated States of Micronesia | FSM |
| Monaco | MON |
| Monaco | MCO |
| Nauru | NRO |
| Palau | PLW |
| Vatican City | VAT |

=== States with limited recognition ===
| Country | Code |
|---|---|
| Abkhazia | ABH |
| Somaliland | SMD |
| South Ossetia | OSS |
| Northern Cyprus | NCY |
| Northern Cyprus | TRNC |
| Transnistria | PMR |
| Western Sahara | ESH |
| Western Sahara | SADR |

=== Dependencies territories ===
| Country | Code |
|---|---|
| Basque Country | BSQ |
| Catalonia | CAT |
| Falkland Islands | FLK |
| Falkland Islands | FIS |
| Greenland | GRL |
| Guernsey | GGY |
| Isle of Man | IOM |
| Jersey | JER |
| Saint Barthélemy | BLM |
| Saint Pierre and Miquelon | SPM |
| Saint Helena | SHN |
| Tokelau | TOK |
| Wallis and Futuna | WLF |
| Wallis and Futuna | WAF |

=== IIGA Member ===
| Country | Code |
|---|---|
| Åland | ALA |
| Gozo | GOZ |

== Obsolete country codes ==
The following codes are obsolete because a country has ceased to exist (e.g. by merging into another or splitting into several countries), changed its name or its code:

| Country | Code |
|---|---|
| Bohemia | BOH |
| British Guiana | BGU |
| British India | BIN |
| Burma | BUR |
| Central African Republic | CAF |
| Ceylon | CEY |
| CIS | CIS |
| Czechoslovakia | TCH |
| Dahomey | DAH |
| Dutch East Indies | INH |
| East Germany | GDR |
| Gold Coast | GOC |
| Ireland | EIR |
| Kosovo | KVX |
| Lebanon | LIB |

| Country | Code |
|---|---|
| Malaya | MAL |
| Netherlands | HOL |
| Netherlands Antilles | ANT |
| New Hebrides | HEB |
| North Vietnam | VNO |
| North Yemen | YAR |
| Northern Rhodesia | NRH |
| Mandatory Palestine | PAL |
| Rhodesia | RHO |
| Romania | ROM |
| Saar | SAA |
| Serbia and Montenegro | SCG |
| Siam | SIA |
| Singapore | SIN |
| South Vietnam | VSO |

| Country | Code |
|---|---|
| South Yemen | YMD |
| Southern Rhodesia | SRH |
| Soviet Union | URS |
| Sudan | SUD |
| Suriname | NGY |
| Taiwan | TAI |
| Tanganyika | TAA |
| United Arab Republic | UAR |
| Upper Volta | UPV |
| West Germany | FRG |
| Western Samoa | WSM |
| Yugoslavia | YUG |
| FR Yugoslavia | YUG |
| Zaire | ZAI |

== See also ==
- Comparison of alphabetic country codes
- Geography of association football
- List of IOC country codes
- ISO 3166-1
