= Åland official football team =

National association football team

Åland
- Nickname: The Ålandish Islanders
- Association: Ålands Fotbollförbund
- Head coach: Alexander Semenov; Stefan Mattsson
- Most caps: Petter Isaksson (13)
- Top scorer: Alexander Weckström; Peter Lundberg (5)
- Home stadium: Wiklöf Holding Arena
- FIFA code: ALA
First colours	Second colours

First international
- Åland 4–2 Sápmi (Mariehamn, Åland; July 1985)

Biggest win
- Åland 6–2 Bornholm (Visby, Gotland; 14 June 1986)

Biggest defeat
- Faroe Islands 7–1 Åland (Tórshavn, Faroe Islands; 12 July 1989)

Island Games
- Appearances: 11 (first in 1989)
- Best result: Runners-up (2009)

The Åland official football team (Swedish: Ålands förbundslag i fotboll) is the official football team for Åland, Finland, and is controlled by Ålands Fotbollförbund. They are not affiliated with FIFA or UEFA.

The team mainly competes in the Island Games. Åland hosted the games in 1991 and 2009. The team won a silver medal in 2009 and bronze medal in 1989 and 1993. They also reached fourth place in 1991 and 2011.

Åland also has a successful club football side, IFK Mariehamn, which plays in the Finnish premier league (Veikkausliiga) and won the league in 2016.

== Tournament records ==
Island Games record
Year	Round	Position	GP	W	D	L	GS	GA
(Faroe Islands) 1989	Third place	3rd	4	2	0	2	10	12
(Åland) 1991	Fourth place	4th	4	2	0	2	3	3
(Isle of Wight) 1993	Third place	3rd	4	3	0	1	7	4
(Gibraltar) 1995	Group stage	7th	4	0	1	3	4	14
(Jersey) 1997	Did not enter							
(Gotland) 1999	Group stage	6th	4	2	0	2	8	6
(Isle of Man) 2001	Did not enter							
(Guernsey) 2003	Did not enter							
(Shetland) 2005	Group stage	7th	5	2	0	3	6	10
(Rhodes) 2007	Group stage	7th	4	2	0	2	7	6
(Åland) 2009	Runners-up	2nd	5	3	1	1	10	7
(Isle of Wight) 2011	Fourth place	4th	4	1	1	2	8	11
(Bermuda) 2013	Did not enter							
(Jersey) 2015	Group stage	9th	4	2	0	2	3	6
(Gotland) 2017	Group stage	7th	4	2	2	0	5	2
(Gibraltar) 2019 (Note: Not held football tournament (Replaced by 2019 Inter Games Football Tournament in Anglesey).)	Did not enter							
(Guernsey) 2023	Group stage	13th	4	0	1	3	2	9
(Orkney) 2025	Did not enter							
Total	Runners-up	11/18	46	18	4	24	73	90

== Selected internationals opponents ==
Opponents	P	W	D	L	GF	GA	GD	Win %
Bermuda	1	0	0	1	0	2	−2	0.00
Bornholm	1	1	0	0	6	2	+4	100.00
Falkland Islands	2	1	1	0	3	2	+1	50.00
Faroe Islands	1	0	0	1	1	7	−6	0.00
Frøya	1	1	0	0	3	1	+2	100.00
Gibraltar	1	1	0	0	2	1	+1	100.00
Gotland	3	1	0	2	4	7	−3	33.33
Greenland	6	5	0	1	17	10	+7	83.33
Guernsey	4	1	1	2	7	9	−2	25.00
Isle of Man	4	2	0	2	6	5	+1	50.00
Isle of Wight	4	2	0	2	3	7	−4	50.00
Jersey	6	0	0	6	5	14	−9	0.00
Menorca	1	0	1	0	1	1	+0	0.00
Öland	2	1	1	0	6	3	+3	50.00
Rhodes	1	0	0	1	2	3	−1	0.00
Saaremaa	2	0	1	1	4	5	−1	0.00
Sápmi	3	2	0	1	5	4	+1	66.67
Sealand	1	0	1	0	2	2	+0	0.00
Shetland	4	3	0	1	8	5	+3	75.00
Western Isles	2	1	0	1	2	2	+0	50.00
Ynys Môn	3	1	0	2	8	8	+0	33.33
Total	53	23	6	24	93	101	−8	43.40

== Kit manufacturers ==
2013–14 home kit	2013–14 away kit	2013–14 GK kit

Period	Kit manufacturer
1943–1998	(Denmark) Hummel
1998–2002	(Italy) Erreà
2002–2007	(Germany) Puma
2007–present	(Germany) Adidas

== Managers ==
- (Åland) Johnny Söderdahl (1989)
- (Åland) Robert Mann
  (Åland) Henrik Bostrom
  (Åland) Mats Danielsson (1995)
- (Åland) Bernt Danielsson
  (Åland) Per-Åke Eriksson (2005)
- (Åland) Bengt Johnsson
  (Åland) Peter Lundberg
  (Åland) Tommy Lundberg (2007)
- (Åland) Peter Lundberg
  (Sweden) Daniel Norrmén (2009)
- (Åland) Per-Åke Eriksson
  (Åland) Thomas Nordström (2011)
- (Åland) Johan Carlssons
  (England) Steve Beeks (2015)
- (Russia) Alexander Semenov
  (Åland) Stefan Mattsson (2017–present)

== Honours ==
=== Non-FIFA competitions ===
- Island Games
  - Silver medal (1): 2009
  - Bronze medal (2): 1989, 1993
