= Football at the 2011 Island Games =

Football at the 2011 Island Games was held from 26 June–1 July 2011 at several venues.

== Events ==
=== Medal table ===
Rank	Nation	Gold	Silver	Bronze	Total
1	Isle of Wight (IOW)	1	0	0	1
1	Åland (ALA)	1	0	0	1
3	Guernsey (GGY)	0	1	0	1
3	Isle of Man (IOM)	0	1	0	1
5	Greenland (GRL)	0	0	1	1
5	Jersey (JEY)	0	0	1	1
Totals (6 entries)		2	2	2	6

=== Medal summary ===
Event	Gold	Silver	Bronze
Men	Isle of Wight	Guernsey	Jersey
Women	Åland	Isle of Man	Greenland
