= Fårösund =

Locality in Gotland, Sweden

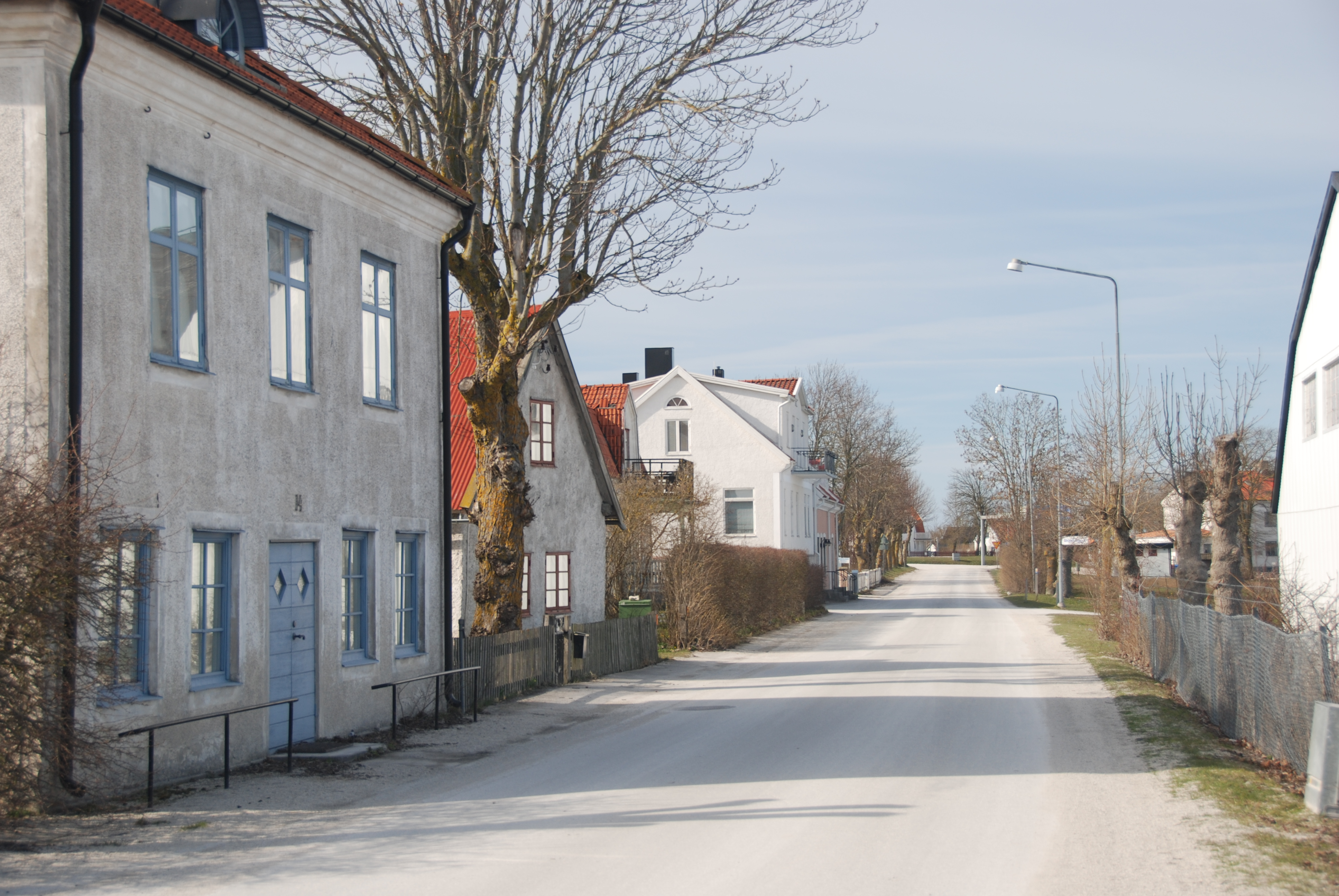
- Strandvägen in Fårösund

- Location within Gotland
- Coordinates: 57°52′N 19°03′E
- Country: Sweden
- Province: Gotland
- County: Gotland County
- Municipality: Gotland Municipality

Area
  - Total: 2.89 km^{2} (1.12 sq mi)

Population (31 December 2014)
  - Total: 800
  - Density: 282/km^{2} (730/sq mi)
- Time zone: UTC+1 (CET)
  - Summer (DST): UTC+2 (CEST)

Fårösund is a locality situated on the Swedish island of Gotland with 800 inhabitants in 2014. The village can be reached by car from Visby. The island of Fårö can be reached by ferry from Fårösund.

Fårösund is the northernmost town in the municipality of Gotland in Gotland County, about 56 km (35 mi) north of Visby. Fårösund is situated on the seafront overlooking the island of Fårö and is visited by tourists during the summer, but it is usually a quiet community in the autumn, winter and spring. Until the mid-1900s it was a small quiet resort as well as a ferry terminal for ferries to Fårö. In January 2018 the Swedish Armed Forces reportedly bought back the base in a deal under negotiation since February 2017. The purchase faced competition from a Russian oligarch who showed interest in the port, but the sale went to the Swedish Fortifications Agency, which paid 20 million Swedish krona for it, after having sold it for 18 million in 2004. The sale requires government approval before 16 April 2018, and the Swedish Armed Forces are to take the base over on 30 April 2018.

Fårösund is also the name of the strait between Gotland's "mainland" and Fårö.

== Climate ==
Fårösund has a maritime climate with narrow seasonal fluctuations by Scandinavian and Baltic standards. The weather station was set up in 1995, which explains the modest record low for January due to recent warming. The climate is among the driest and sunniest in Northern Europe due to the dominance of high-pressure systems over the Baltic Sea. This leads to snow packs being rare. Summer days are usually mild. Diurnal temperature variation is low, which means that it has warmer summer means than many mainland locations due to the warm nights. There is also a quite strong seasonal lag due to the maritime influence. The weather station is located at a slightly more maritime location than the settlement itself. With regards to historical records that Fårösund likely experienced, Gotska Sandön to its north recorded −25 °C (−13 °F) in February 1940 and the defunct Fårö island station recorded 31.2 °C (88.2 °F) in August 1975. The January record low for Gotska Sandön was −22 °C (−8 °F) in 1942 and March has recorded −23 °C (−9 °F).

Climate data for Fårösund (2002–2020 averages, extremes since 1995, sunshine from Visby)
Month	Jan	Feb	Mar	Apr	May	Jun	Jul	Aug	Sep	Oct	Nov	Dec	Year
Record high °C (°F)	10.8 (51.4)	13.7 (56.7)	17.1 (62.8)	22.9 (73.2)	27.1 (80.8)	29.5 (85.1)	30.8 (87.4)	30.1 (86.2)	25.6 (78.1)	21.3 (70.3)	15.8 (60.4)	13.7 (56.7)	30.8 (87.4)
Mean maximum °C (°F)	7.2 (45.0)	7.3 (45.1)	12.2 (54.0)	17.3 (63.1)	22.1 (71.8)	25.5 (77.9)	26.6 (79.9)	26.2 (79.2)	22.2 (72.0)	16.4 (61.5)	11.4 (52.5)	8.5 (47.3)	27.8 (82.0)
Mean daily maximum °C (°F)	2.4 (36.3)	2.2 (36.0)	4.5 (40.1)	9.0 (48.2)	14.1 (57.4)	18.5 (65.3)	21.2 (70.2)	20.9 (69.6)	17.0 (62.6)	11.1 (52.0)	7.2 (45.0)	4.3 (39.7)	11.0 (51.9)
Daily mean °C (°F)	0.6 (33.1)	0.4 (32.7)	2.1 (35.8)	5.9 (42.6)	10.6 (51.1)	15.1 (59.2)	18.2 (64.8)	18.0 (64.4)	14.5 (58.1)	9.1 (48.4)	5.5 (41.9)	2.7 (36.9)	8.6 (47.4)
Mean daily minimum °C (°F)	−1.2 (29.8)	−1.5 (29.3)	−0.4 (31.3)	2.7 (36.9)	7.1 (44.8)	11.7 (53.1)	15.1 (59.2)	15.1 (59.2)	11.9 (53.4)	7.1 (44.8)	3.8 (38.8)	1.0 (33.8)	6.0 (42.9)
Mean minimum °C (°F)	−7.0 (19.4)	−6.9 (19.6)	−5.7 (21.7)	−1.5 (29.3)	2.3 (36.1)	7.4 (45.3)	11.4 (52.5)	11.1 (52.0)	7.2 (45.0)	1.9 (35.4)	−0.9 (30.4)	−3.7 (25.3)	−9.2 (15.4)
Record low °C (°F)	−10.6 (12.9)	−17.0 (1.4)	−17.0 (1.4)	−4.2 (24.4)	−1.2 (29.8)	4.8 (40.6)	9.0 (48.2)	8.4 (47.1)	2.7 (36.9)	−0.6 (30.9)	−5.7 (21.7)	−13.0 (8.6)	−17.0 (1.4)
Average precipitation mm (inches)	29.7 (1.17)	20.8 (0.82)	21.7 (0.85)	19.4 (0.76)	26.3 (1.04)	39.4 (1.55)	53.7 (2.11)	57.0 (2.24)	38.1 (1.50)	52.6 (2.07)	49.6 (1.95)	39.8 (1.57)	448.1 (17.63)
Mean monthly sunshine hours	37	70	167	261	322	331	313	265	200	103	42	31	2,142
Source 1: SMHI Open Data (temperature)
Source 2: SMHI Open Data (precipitation)

== History ==
During the Crimean War, the fleet of the alliance opposing the Russian Empire used Fårösund as their Baltic Sea base. An artillery battery for the defence of the southern part of the inlet to Fårösund had been built in 1721, on the south shore opposite the Skarv shallows, and a blockhouse housing two 8-pounder cannons was constructed further out on the Bungenäs. After the Treaty of Nystad in 1721, these fortifications were abandoned. In 1818, Fårösund's importance as a Naval base was once again brought to light. In 1885, when it seemed like there could be a conflict between Russia and the UK, the area around the town was further fortified by placing a line of naval mines around the harbor. This escalation of the defence was made to indicate that Sweden was determined to maintain its neutrality. Therefore, a battery housing of seven 12 cm muzzle-loading guns was hastily built at the south end of the strait. Later, a similar but smaller battery was built at the north end and finally a third, for heavier artillery, southeast of the first battery. In 1900–02, the two first batteries were converted and updated with more modern armament. Since 1905, there was a coastal artillery detachment from Vaxholm Coastal Artillery Regiment (KA 1) stationed in Fårösund where barracks for the unit had been built in 1902–06.

The Gotland Coastal Artillery Regiment (KA 3), established in 1937, started an economic boom in the town including the building of a new shipyard. Prior to the 1950s, the port also served as a submarine base (it remained available as a forward operating location for submarines up until the 1990s). The regiment, however, was dissolved in 2000. As of 2002, the old military regiment area is demilitarized and used by many companies that have started since the regiment was closed. In February 2017 though it was being reported (initially by the daily business newspaper Dagens Industri) that the government, in the form of the Swedish Fortifications Agency, was attempting to buy back the old military facilities including the port despite competing bids from private interests including the controversial Russian billionaire Vladimir Antonov who wished to procure them for their own purposes. This was part of ongoing efforts to rebuild Gotland's (and by extension, Sweden's) defences in light of the continuing deterioration in regional stability.

In January 2018 the Swedish Armed Forces have reportedly bought back the base in a deal under negotiation since February 2017. The purchase faced competition from a Russian oligarch who showed interest in the port, but the sale went to the Swedish Fortifications Agency, which paid 20 million Swedish krona for it, after having sold it for 18 million in 2004. The sale requires government approval before 16 April 2018, and the Swedish Armed Forces are to take the base over on 30 April 2018.

== Sports ==
The following sports clubs are located in Fårösund:

- Fårösunds GoIK

== See also ==
- Military on Gotland
- Swedish Coastal Artillery
- Fårösund Fortress
- Sweden during World War I
- Sweden during World War II
