= Gotland official football team =

Men's association football team

Gotland
- Association: Gotlands Fotbollförbund
- Top scorer: Peter Öhman
First colours

First international
- Gotland 5–1 Bornholm (Visby, Gotland; 13 June 1986)

Biggest win
- Gotland 12–1 Hitra Municipality (Visby, Gotland; 27 June 1999)

Biggest defeat
- Gotland 1–4 Åland (Fardhem, Gotland; 1 July 1999); Gotland 2–5 Guernsey (Freshwater, Isle of Wight; 27 June 2011); Guernsey 3–0 Gotland (Saint Brelade, Jersey; 29 June 2015)

The Gotlandic official football team is the official football team for Gotland, an island off the east coast of Sweden. They are not affiliated with FIFA or UEFA. Gotland is a member of the International Island Games Association and has taken part in Football at the Island Games.

== Selected matches ==
Date	Competition	Venue	Opponent	Score
29 June 2017	2017 Island Games	Gotland	Jersey	2–3
27 June 2017	2017 Island Games	Gotland	Greenland	0–1
26 June 2017	2017 Island Games	Gotland	Western Isles	8–0
25 June 2017	2017 Island Games	Gotland	Frøya	7–1
2 July 2015	2015 Island Games	Jersey	Saare County	2–3
30 June 2015	2015 Island Games	Jersey	Ynys Môn	2–3
29 June 2015	2015 Island Games	Jersey	Guernsey	0–3
28 June 2015	2015 Island Games	Jersey	Gibraltar	1–2
28 June 2011	2011 Island Games	Isle of Wight	Ynys Môn	1–2
28 June 2011	2011 Island Games	Isle of Wight	Falkland Islands	6–1
27 June 2011	2011 Island Games	Isle of Wight	Guernsey	2–5
26 June 2011	2011 Island Games	Isle of Wight	Isle of Man	2–4
2 July 2009	2009 Island Games	Åland	Greenland	4–3
30 June 2009	2009 Island Games	Åland	Isle of Man	2–4
29 June 2009	2009 Island Games	Åland	Falkland Islands	2–0
28 June 2009	2009 Island Games	Åland	Western Isles	1–2
5 July 2007	2007 Island Games	Rhodes	Jersey	0–1
4 July 2007	2007 Island Games	Rhodes	Frøya	3–0
2 July 2007	2007 Island Games	Rhodes	Western Isles	1–3
1 July 2007	2007 Island Games	Rhodes	Western Isles	1–2
4 July 2003	2003 Island Games	Alderney	Greenland	2–1
3 July 2003	2003 Island Games	Alderney	Saare County	3–0
1 July 2003	2003 Island Games	Guernsey	Jersey	0–0
30 June 2003	2003 Island Games	Guernsey	Frøya	2–2
29 June 2003	2003 Island Games	Guernsey	Shetland	0–0
2 July 1999	1999 Island Games	Gotland	Greenland	7–2
1 July 1999	1999 Island Games	Gotland	Åland	1–4
29 June 1999	1999 Island Games	Gotland	Isle of Man	4–4
28 June 1999	1999 Island Games	Gotland	Shetland	3–1
27 June 1999	1999 Island Games	Gotland	Åland	3–0
15 June 1986		Gotland	Åland	3–0
14 June 1986		Gotland	Öland	3–2
13 June 1986		Gotland	Bornholm	5–1

== Notable players ==
- (Gotland) Peter Öhman - national team top scorer
