= Western Isles representative football team =

Scottish men's association football team

Western Isles
- Association: Western Isles Island Games Association
- Most caps: Scott Maciver; Domhnal Mackay (10)
- Top scorer: Scott Maciver (6)
- Home stadium: Goathill Park, Stornoway, Isle of Lewis
First colours

First international
- Guernsey 2–1 Western Isles (Cunningsburgh, Shetland; 11 July 2005)

Biggest win
- Western Isles 7–1 Falkland Islands (Eckerö, Åland; 30 June 2009)

Biggest defeat
- Isle of Man 9–0 Western Isles (St Lawrence, Jersey; 28 June 2015)

The Western Isles representative team is the representative football team for the Western Isles, Scotland. They are not affiliated with FIFA or UEFA. Most players selected either play in the Lewis and Harris Football League or the Uist & Barra Football League. The team has participated in several Island Games tournaments since 2005.

== Island Games record ==
Island Games record
| Year | Round | Position | GP | W | D | L | GF | GA |
|---|---|---|---|---|---|---|---|---|
| (Faroe Islands) 1989 | Did not enter | | | | | | | |
| (Åland) 1991 | Did not enter | | | | | | | |
| (Isle of Wight) 1993 | Did not enter | | | | | | | |
| (Gibraltar) 1995 | Did not enter | | | | | | | |
| (Jersey) 1997 | Did not enter | | | | | | | |
| (Gotland) 1999 | Did not enter | | | | | | | |
| (Isle of Man) 2001 | Did not enter | | | | | | | |
| (Guernsey) 2003 | Did not enter | | | | | | | |
| (Shetland) 2005 | Third place | 3rd | 5 | 2 | 2 | 1 | 14 | 10 |
| (Rhodes) 2007 | Third place | 3rd | 3 | 2 | 0 | 1 | 5 | 3 |
| (Åland) 2009 | Group stage | 8th | 4 | 2 | 0 | 2 | 13 | 8 |
| (Isle of Wight) 2011 | Group stage | 12th | 3 | 0 | 0 | 3 | 0 | 5 |
| (Bermuda) 2013 | Did not enter | | | | | | | |
| (Jersey) 2015 | Group stage | 11th | 4 | 2 | 0 | 2 | 5 | 15 |
| (Gotland) 2017 | Group stage | 11th | 4 | 1 | 1 | 2 | 5 | 14 |
| (Gibraltar) 2019 (Note: No football tournament held. (Replaced by 2019 Inter Games Football Tournament in Anglesey).) | Group stage | 9th | 4 | 1 | 0 | 3 | 4 | 12 |
| (Guernsey) 2023 | Group stage | 11th | 4 | 2 | 0 | 2 | 4 | 3 |
| (Orkney) 2025 | Group stage | 8th | 3 | 0 | 1 | 2 | 3 | 6 |
| Total | Third place | 9/18 | 34 | 12 | 4 | 18 | 53 | 76 |

== Selected internationals ==
| Date | Venue | | Opponent | Score |
|---|---|---|---|---|
| Jul 17 2025 | Orkney | Western Isles | Gozo | 3–3 (1–3) |
| Jul 14 2025 | Orkney | Western Isles | Ynys Môn | 0–1 |
| Jul 13 2025 | Orkney | Western Isles | Bermuda U23 | 0–2 |
| Jul 13 2023 | Guernsey | Western Isles | Menorca | 2–1 |
| Jul 11 2023 | Guernsey | Western Isles | Åland | 2–0 |
| Jul 10 2023 | Guernsey | Western Isles | Isle of Wight | 0–1 |
| Jul 9 2023 | Guernsey | Western Isles | Guernsey | 0–1 |
| Jun 20 2019 | Anglesey | Western Isles | Saint Helena | 2–1 |
| Jun 18 2019 | Anglesey | Western Isles | Orkney | 1–2 |
| Jun 17 2019 | Anglesey | Western Isles | Jersey | 0–7 |
| Jun 16 2019 | Anglesey | Western Isles | Ynys Môn | 1–2 |
| Jun 29 2017 | Åland | Western Isles | Hitra | 1–1 (5–3) |
| Jun 27 2017 | Åland | Western Isles | Frøya | 4–2 |
| Jun 26 2017 | Åland | Western Isles | Gotland | 0–8 |
| Jun 25 2017 | Åland | Western Isles | Greenland | 0–3 |
| Jul 02 2015 | Jersey | Western Isles | Falkland Islands | 2–1 |
| Jun 30 2015 | Jersey | Western Isles | Alderney | 3–2 |
| Jun 29 2015 | Jersey | Western Isles | Jersey | 0–3 |
| Jun 28 2015 | Jersey | Western Isles | Isle of Man | 0–9 |
| Jun 30 2011 | Isle of Wight | Western Isles | Greenland | 0–1 |
| Jun 28 2011 | Isle of Wight | Western Isles | Saaremaa | 0–2 |
| Jun 27 2011 | Isle of Wight | Western Isles | Åland | 0–2 |
| Jul 03 2009 | Åland | Western Isles | Menorca | 1–4 |
| Jun 30 2009 | Åland | Western Isles | Falkland Islands | 7–1 |
| Jun 29 2009 | Åland | Western Isles | Isle of Man | 0–5 |
| Jun 28 2009 | Åland | Western Isles | Gotland | 2–1 |
| Apr 24 2009 | Åland | Western Isles | Shetland | 1–0 |
| Jul 5 2007 | Rhodes | Western Isles | Bermuda U23 | 1–0 |
| Jul 4 2007 | Rhodes | Western Isles | Rhodes | 0–1 |
| Jul 2 2007 | Rhodes | Western Isles | Gotland | 3–1 |
| Jul 1 2007 | Rhodes | Western Isles | Gotland | 2–1 |
| Sep 15 2006 | Western Isles | Western Isles | Shetland | 3–1 |
| Jul 15 2005 | Shetland | Western Isles | Isle of Man | 4–0 |
| Jul 14 2005 | Shetland | Western Isles | Orkney | 5–4 |
| Jul 13 2005 | Shetland | Western Isles | Ynys Môn | 0–0 |
| Jul 12 2005 | Shetland | Western Isles | Greenland | 4–4 |
| Jul 11 2005 | Shetland | Western Isles | Guernsey | 1–2 |

== Notable players ==
- Eachainn Miller - played for Stirling University (Scotland)

== Honours ==
=== Non-FIFA competitions ===
- Island Games
  - Bronze medal (2): 2005, 2007
