= Isle of Wight official football team =

Men's association football team representing Isle of Wight

Isle of Wight
- Association: Isle of Wight Football Association
- Home stadium: St Georges Park, Newport, Isle of Wight
First colours	Second colours

First international
- Åland 1–0 Isle of Wight (Mariehamn, Åland; 24 June 1991)

Biggest win
- Sark 0–20 Isle of Wight (Saint Martin, Guernsey; 30 June 2003)

Biggest defeat
- Ynys Môn 5–1 Isle of Wight (Mariehamn, Åland; 25 June 1991); Isle of Man 5–1 Isle of Wight (22 May 2004)

Island Games
- Appearances: 11 (first in 1991)
- Best result: Champions (1995, 2011)

The Isle of Wight football team represents the Isle of Wight at the biennial Island Games, which it won in 1995 and 2011. The Isle of Wight is not a member of FIFA or UEFA, it is an island within England and plays under the auspices of the Football Association, the governing body for football in England. The Isle of Wight plays separately in St George's Park which has a capacity of 3,200 and has 200 seats, however the Isle of Wight is divisional FA of The Hampshire Football Association, which is a county FA of the English FA who are part of FIFA and play at Wembley Stadium which has a capacity of 90,000.

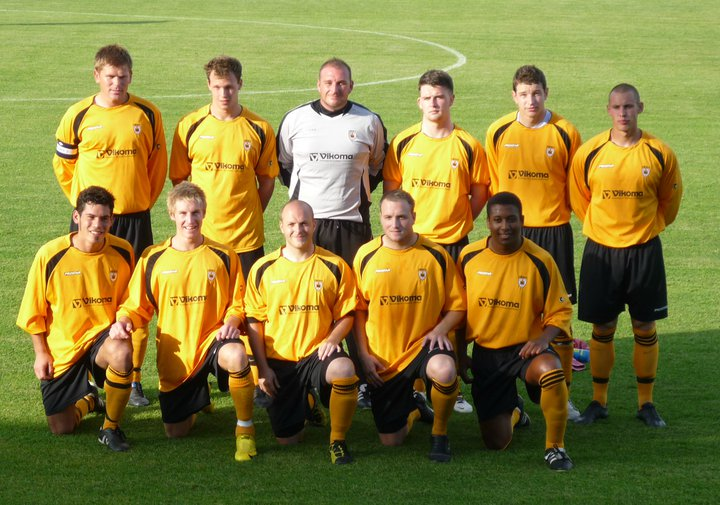
Starting XI in the 2011 Island Games football final held at St Georges Park, Newport, Isle of Wight vs Guernsey

== Isle of Wight Football Association ==
The Isle of Wight Football Association was founded in 1898.

== Island Games record ==
Year	Position	GP	W	D	L	GF	GA
(Faroe Islands) 1989	did not enter						
(Åland) 1991	7th	4	1	1	2	3	10
(Isle of Wight) 1993	5th	4	2	1	1	4	3
(Gibraltar) 1995	1st	5	4	0	1	7	3
(Jersey) 1997	3rd	4	2	2	0	7	2
(Gotland) 1999	3rd	5	4	0	1	22	8
(Isle of Man) 2001	4th	4	1	1	2	6	6
(Guernsey) 2003	4th	5	2	0	3	24	9
(Shetland) 2005	did not enter						
(Rhodes) 2007	did not enter						
(Åland) 2009	10th	4	1	0	3	6	10
(Isle of Wight) 2011	1st	5	5	0	0	16	4
(Bermuda) 2013	did not enter						
(Jersey) 2015	6th	4	2	1	1	7	3
(Gotland) 2017	did not enter						
(Gibraltar) 2019	No tournament held						
(Guernsey) 2023	3rd	5	4	0	1	9	5
Total	11/15	49	28	6	15	111	61

== Selected Internationals opponents ==
Updated as of June 2023

Opponents	Matches	Win	Draw	Loss	GF	GA	GD	Win%
Åland	4	2	0	2	7	3	+4	50.00
Alderney	1	1	0	0	4	0	+4	100.00
Bermuda	1	1	0	0	2	1	+1	100.00
Falkland Islands	1	1	0	0	3	0	+3	100.00
Frøya	1	1	0	0	6	2	+4	100.00
Gibraltar	5	3	0	2	6	8	−2	60.00
Greenland	6	3	1	2	14	8	+6	50.00
Guernsey	7	3	2	2	14	12	+2	42.86
Hitra	2	2	0	0	7	1	+6	100.00
Isle of Man	2	1	0	1	2	5	−3	50.00
Jersey	7	2	0	5	6	11	−5	28.57
Rhodes	2	1	0	1	4	3	+1	50.00
Saaremaa	2	1	0	1	11	2	+9	50.00
Sark	1	1	0	0	20	0	+20	100.00
Shetland	3	1	2	0	2	0	+2	33.33
Western Isles	1	1	0	0	1	0	+1	100.00
Ynys Môn	5	1	2	2	7	9	−2	20.00

== Current squad ==
Squad was picked for the 2023 Island Games in July 2023. The side was managed by Tom McInnes.

No.	Pos.	Player	Date of birth (age)	Club
	GK	Edward Hatt	22 December 1993 (aged 29)	(Isle of Wight official football team) Cowes Sports
	GK	Leon Pitman	1 January 2001 (aged 22)	(Isle of Wight official football team) Newport IW
	GK	Olly West	29 May 1998 (aged 25)	(Isle of Wight official football team) Cowes Sports
	DF	Ryan Oatley	29 January 1996 (aged 27)	(Isle of Wight official football team) Cowes Sports
	DF	Adam Biss	28 November 2000 (aged 22)	(The Football Association) Chichester City
	DF	George Colson	24 October 1993 (aged 29)	(Isle of Wight official football team) Cowes Sports
	DF	Joe Hancock	3 September 1998 (aged 24)	(Isle of Wight official football team) Cowes Sports
	DF	Ryan Hughes	11 November 1997 (aged 25)	(The Football Association) Lymington Town
	DF	Liam Triggs	31 October 1994 (aged 28)	(Isle of Wight official football team) Cowes Sports
	MF	Joe Butcher	22 August 1994 (aged 28)	(Isle of Wight official football team) Newport IW
	MF	Nathan Lewis	28 November 1995 (aged 27)	(The Football Association) Raynes Park Vale
	MF	John McKie	9 June 1989 (aged 34)	(Isle of Wight official football team) Cowes Sports
	MF	Josh Wakefield	6 November 1993 (aged 29)	(The Football Association) Salisbury
	MF	Jimmy Mumford	7 April 1998 (aged 25)	(The Football Association) Eastleigh
	MF	Finn Phillips	28 November 1998 (aged 24)	(Isle of Wight official football team) Cowes Sports
	FW	Jordan Browne	1 January 2000 (aged 23)	(Isle of Wight official football team) Newport IW
	FW	Joe Craig	3 August 2000 (aged 22)	(Isle of Wight official football team) Newport IW
	FW	Jake Scrimshaw	13 September 2000 (aged 22)	(The Football Association) Eastleigh
	FW	Josh Younie	29 November 1990 (aged 32)	(Isle of Wight official football team) Newport IW
	FW	Connor Kelly	28 November 1992 (aged 30)	(Isle of Wight official football team) Cowes Sports

== Honours ==
=== Non-FIFA competitions ===
- Island Games
  - Gold medal (2): 1995, 2011
  - Bronze medal (3): 1997, 1999, 2023
