= Isle of Man official football team =

Men's national association football team representing the Isle of Man

Isle of Man
- Nickname(s): The Yellows
- Association: Isle of Man Football Association
- Head coach: Paul Jones
- Most caps: Peter Langridge
- Top scorer: Peter Langridge
- Home stadium: The Bowl, Douglas
- FIFA code: IOM
First colours	Second colours

First international
- Isle of Wight 1–0 Isle of Man (Isle of Wight; 4 July 1993)

Biggest win
- Hitra Municipality 0–13 Isle of Man (Fardhem, Gotland; 28 June 1999)

Biggest defeat
- Isle of Man 0–5 Guernsey (Eckerö, Åland; 3 July 2009)

Island Games
- Appearances: 12 (first in 1993)
- Best result: Champions (2017)

Regions' Cup
- Appearances: 2 (first in 2007)
- Best result: Intermediate round (2007, 2015)

The Isle of Man Representative County football team is the football team of the Isle of Man and is controlled by the Isle of Man Football Association. The team plays in a yellow and red home kit and an all navy blue away kit.

== History ==
The Isle of Man are not members of FIFA or UEFA, as the Isle of Man FA are members of The Football Association (The FA), with similar status to an English county. Since they are not a member of either FIFA or UEFA, they are not eligible to enter either the World Cup or European Championship. The Isle of Man therefore is limited to different forms of competition. The main competition the Isle of Man national football team takes part in is the biennial Football at the Island Games tournament. Isle of Man has won the tournament once, and came in runner-up four times.

They play in the International Quadrangular Tournament, a tournament for semi-professional and amateur national teams from the Isle of Man, Scotland, the Republic of Ireland and Northern Ireland. They won the tournament in 2000, beating Scotland 1–0 in the final, despite the Isle of Man possessing the only truly all-amateur set-up while the other teams fielded semi-professional players.

Another regular competition played in is the Steam Packet Football Festival, which usually features the Isle of Man along with lower division teams from The Football League. The Isle of Man's best result to date in the tournament, was beating Burnley F.C. 1–0 in 2000.

In the 2005–06 season, the Isle of Man national team won The FA National League System Cup, a competition for amateur teams representing the leagues at Step 7 of the National League System with a few other leagues permitted by the FA. The Isle of Man beat the Cambridgeshire Football Association County League team 4–0 in the final and represented England in the UEFA Regions' Cup. Isle of Man later repeated their FA Inter-League Cup win in the 2013–14 season.

In 2014, a new team, Ellan Vannin, was created by the Manx Independent Football Association in order to enter ConIFA and compete at the ConIFA World Football Cup. As opposed to the official Isle of Man team, which is composed only of Isle of Man Football League players, Ellan Vannin will allow only those with Manx ties to play for them, in line with FIFA eligibility rules. Initially, the IoMFA was reluctant to allow MIFA to run the Ellan Vannin side, but the two associations agreed to work together in February 2014 to allow both the IoMFA side and Ellan Vannin to continue.

== Tournament records ==
=== Island Games record ===
Football at the Island Games record
Year	Round	Position	GP	W	D	L	GS	GA
(Faroe Islands) 1989	Did not enter							
(Åland) 1991	Did not enter							
(Isle of Wight) 1993	Runners-up	2nd	4	2	0	2	8	7
(Gibraltar) 1995	Group stage	8th	4	0	0	4	2	12
(Jersey) 1997	Did not enter							
(Gotland) 1999	Runners-up	2nd	5	3	1	1	20	6
(Isle of Man) 2001	Group stage	7th	4	1	1	2	12	6
(Guernsey) 2003	Runners-up	2nd	4	3	0	1	9	5
(Shetland) 2005	Fourth place	4th	5	2	1	2	12	7
(Rhodes) 2007	Did not enter							
(Åland) 2009	Fourth place	4th	5	3	0	2	12	10
(Isle of Wight) 2011	Group stage	8th	4	2	1	1	16	9
(Bermuda) 2013	Did not enter							
(Jersey) 2015	Runners-up	2nd	5	4	0	1	22	5
(Gotland) 2017	Champions	1st	5	5	0	0	24	5
(Gibraltar) 2019 (Note: Not held football tournament (Replaced by 2019 Inter Games Football Tournament in Anglesey).)	Third place	3rd	4	3	0	1	20	5
(Guernsey) 2023	Group stage	9th	4	2	0	2	7	5
Total	1 title	12/18	53	30	4	19	164	82

== Selected Internationals opponents ==
Last update: 10 July 2009

Opponents	Matches	Win	Draw	Loss	GF	GA	GD	Win%
Åland	4	2	0	2	5	6	−1	50.00
Falkland Islands	3	3	0	0	20	1	+19	100.00
Gibraltar	2	0	0	2	1	3	−2	0.00
Gotland	2	1	1	0	8	6	+2	50.00
Greenland	1	0	0	1	0	4	−4	0.00
Guernsey	3	0	0	3	3	11	−8	0.00
Hitra Municipality	1	1	0	0	13	0	+13	100.00
Isle of Wight	2	1	0	1	5	2	+3	50.00
Jersey	3	2	0	1	4	6	−2	66.67
Rhodes	1	0	0	1	1	3	−2	0.00
Saare County	2	1	1	0	6	2	+4	50.00
Shetland	4	2	1	1	9	5	+4	50.00
Western Isles	2	1	0	1	5	4	+1	50.00
Ynys Môn	3	1	0	2	1	3	−2	33.33

== Honours ==
=== Non-FIFA competitions ===
- Island Games
  - Gold medal (1): 2017
  - Silver medal (4): 1993, 1999, 2003, 2015
- Inter-Games
  - Bronze medal (1): 2019

=== Football Association ===
- FA Inter-League Cup
  - Winner: 2005–06, 2013–14
  - Silver medal: 2011–12
