= Hitra official football team =

Football team for Hitra Municipality, Norway

Hitra
- Nickname(s): De Grå Elgene (The Gray Moose)
- Association: Hitra Idrettsrâd
First colours

First international
- Ynys Môn 8–0 Hitra Municipality (Saint Peter, Jersey; 29 June 1997)

Biggest win
- Hitra Municipality 5–1 Alderney (Saint Ouen, Jersey; 2 July 2015)

Biggest defeat
- Hitra Municipality 0–13 Isle of Man (Fardhem, Gotland; 28 June 1999)

The Hitra official football team is the official football team for Hitra Municipality in Norway. They are not affiliated with FIFA or UEFA. Hitra is a member of the International Island Games Association and has taken part in Football at the Island Games.

Most of the players are sourced from the island's main club team Hitra Fotballklubb, which as of the 2025 season plays in the Norwegian Fourth Division (National tier 5).

== Selected internationals ==
Date	Venue	Opponent	Score
29 July 1997	Jersey	Ynys Môn	0–8
1 July 1997	Jersey	Isle of Wight	0–4
3 July 1997	Jersey	Shetland	1–2
4 July 1997	Jersey	Frøya	1–4
27 June 1999	Gotland	Gotland	1–12
28 June 1999	Gotland	Isle of Man	0–13
29 June 1999	Gotland	Shetland	1–4
1 July 1999	Gotland	Saare County	2–1
28 June 2015	Jersey	Falkland Islands	1-2
29 June 2015	Jersey	Shetland	1–4
30 June 2015	Jersey	Isle of Wight	1–4
2 July 2015	Jersey	Alderney	5-1
25 June 2017	Gotland	Isle of Man	0–5
26 June 2017	Gotland	Ynys Môn	1–3
27 June 2017	Gotland	Falkland Islands	2–1
27 June 2017	Gotland	Western Isles	1–1; 3-5
16 June 2019	Ynys Môn	Alderney	4–2
17 June 2019	Ynys Môn	Isle of Man	1–7
20 June 2019	Ynys Môn	Jersey	1–3
