= Ynys Môn football team =

Men's association football team

Ynys Môn
- Head coach: Campbell Harrison
First colours	Second colours

First international
- Faroe Islands 6–0 Ynys Môn (Gøta, Faroe Islands; 6 July 1989)

Biggest win
- Ynys Môn 8–0 Hitra (St Peter, Jersey; 29 June 1997)

Biggest defeat
- Faroe Islands 6–0 Ynys Môn (Gøta, Faroe Islands; 6 July 1989)

The Ynys Môn football team represents the eponymous island in north Wales. As a part of Wales, Ynys Môn is not affiliated with FIFA or UEFA although players from Anglesey are eligible to play for the Wales national football team.

Ynys Môn is a member of the International Island Games Association and has taken part in the Island Games. The team made its debut at the 1989 Island Games held in the Faroe Islands. Ynys Môn have been one of the most successful football teams at the Island Games, winning the gold medal at the 1999 Island Games in Gotland and winning the silver medal a further five times. Ynys Môn also won the 2019 Inter Games Football Tournament as hosts – a replacement tournament after football was not included on the programme for the 2019 Island Games.

== History ==
The Ynys Môn Island Games Association were founder members of the International Island Games Association in 1985 allowing the island to compete from the inaugural 1985 Island Games held on the Isle of Man.

A five-a-side youth football tournament was held at the inaugural games in 1985 held in Douglas, Isle of Man – in which Ynys Môn took the silver medal – but football was completely absent from the programme at the 1987 Island Games held in Guernsey.

Ynys Môn made its debut in the men's football competition on 6 June 1989, losing 6–0 to the Faroe Islands. However, they would go on to claim the silver medal after winning their remaining three matches.

They retained their silver medal at the 1991 Island Games in Åland. After winning all three of their group games, they faced the Faroe Islands in the gold medal match but lost 2–0 to the defending champions.

Ynys Môn were eliminated in the group stages at the 1993 Island Games on the Isle of Wight, finishing sixth overall. At the 1995 Island Games in Gibraltar, they missed out on a semi-final place on goal difference by a single goal and once again finished sixth overall.

They returned to the medal podium at the 1997 Island Games in Jersey. Ynys Môn won their group undefeated to advance to the gold medal match. For the third time, they took home silver after losing 1–0 to hosts Jersey.

At the 1999 Island Games in Gotland, Ynys Môn advanced to the semi-finals in unusual circumstances. They drew both group matches 1–1 against Rhodes and Guernsey but finished as group winners on goals scored after Rhodes and Guernsey had played out a goalless draw. They defeated the Isle of Wight 3–1 in the semi-finals to advance to the gold medal match. Ynys Môn won the gold medal for the first time after defeating the Isle of Man 1–0.

As defending champions at the 2001 Island Games on the Isle of Man, Ynys Môn again reached the gold medal match. However, they were unable to successfully defend their title and took home a fourth silver medal as they lost 3–1 on penalties to Guernsey.

Ynys Môn were eliminated in the group stages at the 2003 Island Games in Guernsey, finishing fifth overall. A similar fate befel them at the 2005 Island Games in Shetland as they again finished fifth overall.

At the 2007 Island Games in Rhodes, Ynys Môn recorded their worst ever result at the Island Games. After being eliminated in the group stage, they lost 6–1 in their placement play-off match against Menorca to finish 11th and last overall.

Ynys Môn missed the 2009 Island Games held in Åland but returned for the 2011 Island Games held on the Isle of Wight. However, they were again eliminated at the group stage and finished ninth overall.

Ynys Môn also missed the 2013 Island Games in Bermuda but returned for the 2015 Island Games in Jersey. Another group stage elimination followed and they finished eighth overall. A similar run followed at the 2017 Island Games in Gotland as they again finished eighth overall.

Anglesey hosted the 2019 Inter Games Football Tournament – a replacement for the 2019 Island Games which did not have football on the programme due to a lack of facilities in Gibraltar. Ynys Môn won all three of their group stage matches to advance to the semi-finals. A 2–1 win against Shetland saw them into the final. Ynys Môn defeated Guernsey by the same scoreline to win the tournament

They returned for the 2023 Island Games in Guernsey. Ynys Môn reached the gold medal match for the sixth time but a 5–2 loss to Jersey followed as they claimed a fifth silver medal.

In the 2025 edition in Orkney, Ynys Môn went undefeated in the group stages and then defeated the Isle of Man in the semi finals, before losing 3-1 to Bermuda U23 in the final to retain their silver medal.

== Notable former players ==
The following have gone on to either represent Wales at senior international level, or have played in a professional football league.

- Dion Donohue
- Jay Gibbs

== Honours ==
- Island Games
  - Gold medal (1): 1999
  - Silver medal (6): 1989, 1991, 1997, 2001, 2023, 2025
- Inter-Games
  - Winners (1): 2019

== See also ==
- Anglesey
- Island Games
- Football at the Island Games
