= Gibraltar national football team results (unofficial matches) =

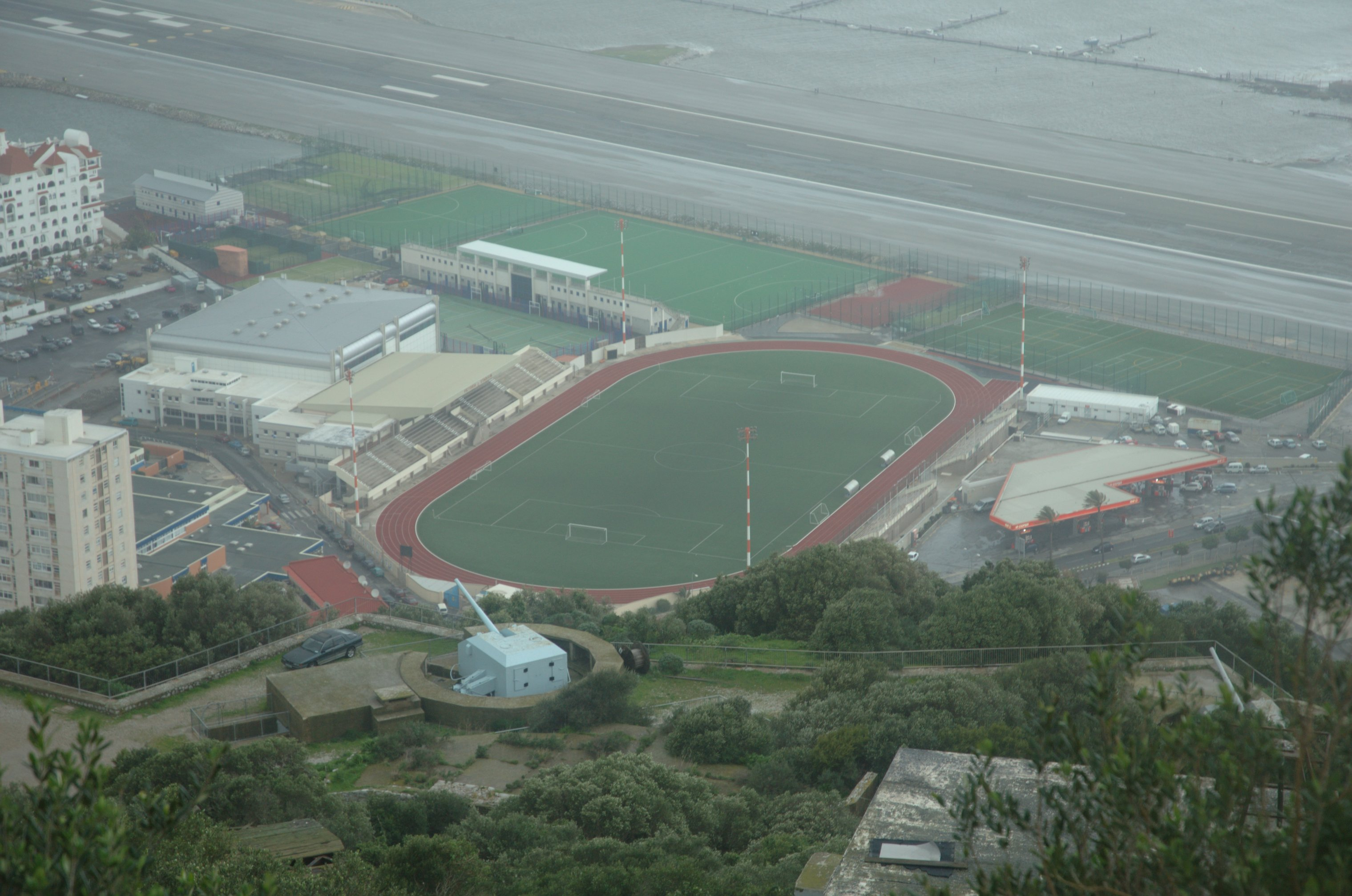
The Victoria Stadium is the home venue for unofficial matches played by the Gibraltar national football team.

The Gibraltar national football team represents the Gibraltar in association football and is controlled by the Gibraltar Football Association (GFA), the governing body of the sport there. It competes as a member of the Union of European Football Associations (UEFA), which encompasses the countries of Europe. Organised football has been played in the country since the 19th century. Gibraltar first applied for UEFA membership in 1997 but was rejected because of intense opposition from Spain. In October 2012, Gibraltar reapplied for full membership and it was granted in March 2013. On 13 May 2016 Gibraltar was accepted as a member of the International Federation of Association Football (FIFA); this was after their original application in 2014 was denied.

The list encompasses the unofficial matches played by the team since 1993. There are three types of unofficial matches: any match that was played by the senior Gibraltar national team before joining UEFA in 2013, any match played by the development team (such as the team representing Gibraltar in the Men's Football at the 2015 Island Games) or any friendly match played against a club team. The team's largest unofficial victory came on 29 June 2003 when they defeated Sark by nineteen goals to nil. Their worst loss is 5–0 against Greenland in 1993.

== Unofficial matches ==
The coloured backgrounds denote the result of the match:

– indicates Gibraltar won the match
– indicates Gibraltar's opposition won the match
– indicates the match ended in a draw

Date	Location	H/A/N	Opponents	Score	Competition
4 July 1993	Isle of Wight	N	Jersey	1–2	Island Games – Group phase
5 July 1993	Isle of Wight	N	Ynys Môn	0–1	Island Games – Group phase
6 July 1993	Isle of Wight	N	Greenland	0–5	Island Games – Group phase
8 July 1993	Isle of Wight	N	Shetland	1–0	Island Games – 7th place match
16 July 1995	Gibraltar	H	Greenland	0–1	Island Games – Group phase
17 July 1995	Gibraltar	H	Isle of Man	2–1	Island Games – Group phase
18 July 1995	Gibraltar	H	Ynys Môn	2–0	Island Games – Group phase
20 July 1995	Gibraltar	H	Jersey	1–0	Island Games – Semi-final
22 July 1995	Gibraltar	H	Isle of Wight	0–1	Island Games – Final
29 June 1997	Jersey	N	Guernsey	1–2	Island Games – Group phase
1 July 1997	Jersey	N	Frøya	4–0	Island Games – Group phase
2 July 1997	Jersey	N	Greenland	5–1	Island Games – Group phase
3 July 1997	Jersey	A	Jersey	2–3	Island Games – Group phase
3 July 1997	Jersey	N	Shetland	1–2	Island Games – 5th place match
28 June 1999	Gotland	N	Åland	1–2	Island Games – Group phase
29 June 1999	Gotland	N	Jersey	1–5	Island Games – Group phase
1 July 1999	Gotland	N	Shetland	2–3	Island Games – 9th – 12th place semi-finals
2 July 1999	Gotland	N	Frøya	5–1	Island Games – 11th place match
11 June 2000	Gibraltar	H	Monaco	5–0	Friendly
9 July 2001	Isle of Man	N	Orkney	2–0	Island Games – Group phase
10 July 2001	Isle of Man	N	Jersey	1–2	Island Games – Group phase
12 July 2001	Isle of Man	N	Shetland	2–0	Island Games – 5th – 8th place semi-finals
13 July 2001	Isle of Man	N	Rhodes	2–0	Island Games – 5th place match
18 February 2002	France	N	Monaco	2–2	Friendly
29 June 2003	Guernsey	N	Sark	19–0	Island Games – Group phase
30 June 2003	Guernsey	N	Greenland	2–0	Island Games – Group phase
1 July 2003	Guernsey	N	Isle of Wight	1–2	Island Games – Group phase
3 July 2003	Guernsey	N	Orkney	7–1	Island Games – 5th – 8th place semi-finals
4 July 2003	Guernsey	N	Ynys Môn	0–2	Island Games – 5th place match
21 May 2004	Gibraltar	H	Isle of Wight	2–0	GFA Tournament
23 May 2004	Gibraltar	H	Isle of Man	1–0	GFA Tournament
27 May 2005	Gibraltar	H	Monaco	4–0	Friendly
29 May 2006	Germany	N	Republic of St. Pauli	1–1	FIFI Wild Cup – Group phase
31 May 2006	Germany	N	Tibet	5–0	FIFI Wild Cup – Group phase
1 June 2006	Germany	N	Northern Cyprus	0–2	FIFI Wild Cup – Semi-final
3 June 2006	Germany	N	Republic of St. Pauli	2–1	FIFI Wild Cup – Third place match
1 July 2007	Rhodes	N	Jersey	1–1	Island Games – Group phase
2 July 2007	Rhodes	N	Menorca	2–1	Island Games – Group phase
4 July 2007	Rhodes	N	Bermuda U23	2–0	Island Games – Semi-final
5 July 2007	Rhodes	A	Rhodes	4–0	Island Games – Final
20 May 2008	Wales	N	England C	0–1	Four Nations Tournament
22 May 2008	Wales	A	Wales Semi-Pro	2–6	Four Nations Tournament
24 May 2008	Wales	N	Scotland Semi-Pro	2–4	Four Nations Tournament
28 June 2009	Åland Islands	N	Guernsey	0–0	Island Games – Group phase
29 June 2009	Åland Islands	N	Frøya	8–0	Island Games – Group phase
30 June 2009	Åland Islands	N	Ynys Môn	1–3	Island Games – Group phase
3 July 2009	Åland Islands	N	Isle of Wight	3–0	Island Games – 9th place match
12 March 2011	Gibraltar	H	Faroe Islands	3–0	Friendly
26 June 2011	Isle of Wight	N	Alderney	6–1	Island Games – Group phase
27 June 2011	Isle of Wight	N	Ynys Môn	6–3	Island Games – Group phase
28 June 2011	Isle of Wight	A	Isle of Wight	2–3	Island Games – Group phase
30 June 2011	Isle of Wight	N	Saare County	4–0	Island Games – 5th place match
4 August 2011	Gibraltar	H	(Spain) Cádiz B	0–1	Friendly
15 November 2011	Gibraltar	H	England	3–1	Friendly
9 January 2012	Gibraltar	H	(England) Bury	2–1	Friendly
28 June 2012	Gibraltar	H	Isle of Man	2–0	International Challenge Shield
30 June 2012	Gibraltar	H	Jersey	2–1	International Challenge Shield
20 July 2012	Gibraltar	H	(England) Portsmouth	4–0	Friendly
31 July 2012	Gibraltar	H	(England) Notts County	3–1	Friendly
3 July 2013	Gibraltar	H	(Scotland) Hibernian	1–3	Friendly
10 July 2013	Gibraltar	H	(England) Charlton Athletic	0–2	Friendly
28 June 2015	Jersey	N	Gotland	2–1	Island Games – Group phase
29 June 2015	Jersey	N	Ynys Môn	1–1	Island Games – Group phase
30 June 2015	Jersey	N	Guernsey	0–4	Island Games – Group phase
2 July 2015	Jersey	N	Åland	0–0 (Note: The match went to extra time and remained 0–0. Åland defeated Gibraltar 6–5 in the subsequent penalty shootout.)	Island Games – 9th place match

== All-time record of unofficial matches ==
=== Record by opponent ===
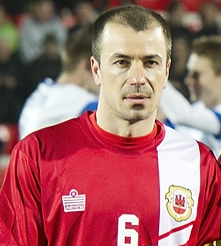
Roy Chipolina scored six goals in the match against Sark, the most goals scored for Gibraltar by an individual in a single match.

Opponents	P	W	D	L	GF	GA	GD	Win %
Åland	2	0	1	1	1	2	−1	0.00
Alderney	1	1	0	0	6	1	+5	100.00
Bermuda U23	1	1	0	0	2	0	+2	100.00
(England) Bury	1	1	0	0	2	1	+1	100.00
(Spain) Cádiz B	1	0	0	1	0	1	−1	0.00
(England) Charlton Athletic	1	0	0	1	0	2	−2	0.00
England	2	1	0	1	3	2	+1	50.00
Faroe Islands	1	1	0	0	3	0	+3	100.00
Frøya	3	3	0	0	17	1	+16	100.00
Gotland	1	1	0	0	2	1	+1	100.00
Greenland	4	2	0	2	7	7	+0	50.00
Guernsey	3	0	1	2	1	6	−5	0.00
(Scotland) Hibernian	1	0	0	1	1	3	−2	0.00
Isle of Man	3	3	0	0	5	1	+4	100.00
Isle of Wight	5	2	0	3	8	6	+2	40.00
Jersey	7	2	1	4	9	14	−5	28.57
Menorca	1	1	0	0	2	1	+1	100.00
Monaco	3	2	1	0	11	2	+9	66.67
Northern Cyprus	1	0	0	1	0	2	−2	0.00
(England) Notts County	1	1	0	0	3	1	+2	100.00
Orkney	2	2	0	0	9	1	+8	100.00
(England) Portsmouth	1	1	0	0	4	0	+4	100.00
Republic of St. Pauli	2	1	1	0	3	2	+1	50.00
Rhodes	2	2	0	0	6	0	+6	100.00
Saare County	1	1	0	0	4	0	+4	100.00
Sark	1	1	0	0	19	0	+19	100.00
Scotland Semi-Pro	1	0	0	1	2	4	−2	0.00
Shetland	4	2	0	2	6	5	+1	50.00
Tibet	1	1	0	0	5	0	+5	100.00
Wales Semi-Pro	1	0	0	1	2	6	−4	0.00
Ynys Môn	6	2	1	3	10	10	+0	33.33

=== Record by competition ===
Competition	P	W	D	L	GF	GA	GD	Win %
FIFI Wild Cup	4	2	1	1	8	4	+4	50.00
International Challenge Shield	2	2	0	0	4	1	+3	100.00
Island Games	43	22	4	17	107	55	+52	51.16
Four Nations Tournament	3	0	0	3	4	11	−7	0.00
Friendly	11	7	1	3	27	11	+16	63.64
GFA Tournament	2	2	0	0	3	0	+3	100.00
Total	65	35	6	24	153	82	+71	53.85

== See also ==
- Gibraltar national football team results
