= Frøya official football team =

Men's official association football team

Frøya
- Nickname: Den Tre Grå Eels
- Association: Frøya Idrettsråd
- Home stadium: Flatøysand Stadion
First colours

First international
- Frøya 1–4 Jersey (Saint Clement, Jersey; 29 June 1997)

Biggest win
- (Frøya Municipality) Frøya 15–0 Sark (Saint Anne, Alderney; 3 July 2003)

Biggest defeat
- Greenland 12–0 Frøya (Hamilton, Bermuda; 15 July 2013)

The Frøya official football team represents the island of Frøya and the wider Frøya Municipality in Norway. As a part of Norway, Frøya is not affiliated with FIFA or UEFA although players from Frøya are eligible to play for the Norway national football team.

Frøya is a member of the International Island Games Association and has taken part in the Island Games. The team made its debut at the 1997 Island Games held in Jersey. At the 2013 Island Games in Bermuda, Frøya achieved their best finish of fourth place.

Most of its players play club football for Frøya FK, which as of the 2025 season plays in the Norwegian Sixth Division (National tier 6).

== History ==
The Island Games Association of Frøya were founder members of the International Island Games Association in 1985 allowing the islands to compete from the inaugural 1985 Island Games held on the Isle of Man.

Frøya made its debut in the men's football competition at the 1997 Island Games held in Jersey. After losing their first three group stage matches, Frøya defeated Greenland 2–1 to avoid finishing last. They then defeated neighbours Hitra 4–1 to finisg seventh overall.

At the 1999 Island Games in Gotland, Frøya had a similar experience. After losing their first two matches, they defeated Saare County 4–1 to avoid finishing last. However, they lost to Guernsey and Gibraltar in their placement matches and finished 12th overall.

Frøya missed the 2001 Island Games on the Isle of Man but returned for the 2003 Island Games in Guernsey. Despite drawing with Gotland, they finished bottom of their group and contested the 13th-place play off which was played in Alderney. Frøya thumped opponents Sark 15–0.

They missed the 2005 Island Games in Shetland but returned for the 2007 Island Games in Rhodes. Frøya finished second in their group but were ranked eighth overall after losing their placement play-off matches.

At the 2009 Island Games held in Åland, Frøya lost all three of their group stage matches and only avoided finishing last after defeating the Falkland Islands 3–1 in the 15th-place play-off.

Frøya missed the 2011 Island Games held on the Isle of Wight but returned for the 2013 Island Games in Bermuda. They recorded their best finish of fourth place after losing the bronze medal match 6–0 against the Falkland Islands.

They missed the 2015 Island Games in Jersey but returned for the 2017 Island Games in Gotland. They were eliminated in the group stage but a draw against Greenland saw them avoid the play-off for last place. Instead, they lost 4–2 to Saare County in the 13th-place play-off.

Frøya did not take part in the 2019 Inter Games Football Tournament in Anglesey, held as a replacement for the 2019 Island Games which did not have football on the programme due to a lack of facilities in Gibraltar.

They returned for the 2023 Island Games in Guernsey. Frøya lost all three of their group matches but avoided finishing last by defeating Saint Helena 4–2 in the 15th-place play-off.

=== Record of matches ===
Opponent	P	W	D	L	GF	GA
Åland	1	0	0	1	1	3
Ynys Môn	1	0	0	1	0	3
Bermuda	2	0	0	2	0	15
Falkland Islands	3	1	0	2	4	9
Greenland	5	1	1	3	5	20
Guernsey	3	0	0	3	2	15
Saaremaa	3	0	0	3	5	9
Isle of Wight	1	0	0	1	2	6
Jersey	2	0	0	2	2	9
Gibraltar	3	0	0	3	1	17
Gotland	3	0	1	2	3	12
Hitra	1	1	0	0	4	1
Orkney	1	0	0	1	2	3
Rhodes	1	0	0	1	1	3
Saint Helena	1	1	0	0	4	2
Sark	1	1	0	0	15	0
Shetland	1	0	0	1	3	1
Western Isles	1	0	0	1	2	4
