= Football at the Island Games =

- Founded: 1989
- Region: International
- Current champions: Men – Jersey (4th title); Women – Bermuda (2nd title)
- Most championships: Men – Jersey (4 titles); Women - Åland; Faroe Islands (3 titles)
- Guernsey 2023 – Men's; Guernsey 2023 – Women's

Association football has been a regular event since 1989 at the Island Games, the biennial multi-sports event for island nations, territories and dependencies. A 5-a-side competition for under-16s was held at the inaugural event on the Isle of Man, and the success this minor competition brought to the games meant senior men's football was included on the itinerary for the first time in the Faroe Islands, in 1989. Women's football was included on the games' schedule for the first time in 2001.

Over the years, the competition has grown in stature, becoming one of the most important competitions for 'national' teams in non-FIFA football, and has grown from a five-team round robin competition to a 16-team tournament. Football was not included in the 2019 Island Games as hosts Gibraltar do not have enough pitches. As a replacement the 2019 Inter Games Football Tournament was held in Anglesey, and was not officially part of the games.

== Men's tournament ==
=== Results ===
Year	Games	Host	Final			Third Place			Num. teams
Year	Games	Host	Gold	Score	Silver	Bronze	Score	Fourth place	Num. teams
1989 details	III	Faroe Islands	Faroe Islands	Round robin	Ynys Môn	Åland	Round robin	Greenland	5
1991 details	IV	Åland	Faroe Islands	2–0	Ynys Môn	Jersey	2–0	Åland	8
1993 details	V	Isle of Wight	Jersey	5–1	Isle of Man	Åland	2–1	Greenland	8
1995 details	VI	Gibraltar	Isle of Wight	1–0	Gibraltar	Jersey	6–3	Greenland	8
1997 details	VII	Jersey	Jersey	1–0	Ynys Môn	Isle of Wight	3–1	Guernsey	9
1999 details	VIII	Gotland	Ynys Môn	1–0	Isle of Man	Isle of Wight	2–0	Jersey	14
2001 details	IX	Isle of Man	Guernsey	0–0 (p.s.o)	Ynys Môn	Jersey	2–0	Isle of Wight	12
2003 details	X	Guernsey	Guernsey	3–1	Isle of Man	Jersey	3–0	Isle of Wight	15
2005 details	XI	Shetland	Shetland	2–0	Guernsey	Western Isles	4–0	Isle of Man	10
2007 details	XII	Rhodes	Gibraltar	4–0	Rhodes	Western Isles	1–0	Bermuda	11
2009 details	XIII	Åland	Jersey	2–1	Åland	Guernsey	5–0	Isle of Man	16
2011 details	XIV	Isle of Wight	Isle of Wight	4–2	Guernsey	Jersey	5–1	Åland	15
2013 details	XV	Bermuda	Bermuda	1–0	Greenland	Falkland Islands	6–0	Frøya	4
2015 details	XVI	Jersey	Guernsey	3–0	Isle of Man	Menorca	1–0	Shetland	16
2017 details	XVII	Gotland	Isle of Man	6–0	Greenland	Guernsey	1–0	Menorca	16
2019	XVIII	Gibraltar	No football tournament held (see 2019 Inter Games Football Tournament)						
2023 details	XIX	Guernsey	Jersey	5–2	Ynys Môn	Isle of Wight	2–1	Bermuda U23	16
2025 details	XX	Orkney	Bermuda U23	3–1	Ynys Môn	Isle of Man	3–2	Jersey	12
2027 details	XXI	Faroe Islands							13

=== Medalists ===
Team	Gold	Silver	Bronze
Jersey	4 ('93, '97, '09, '23)		5 ('91, '95, '01, '03, '11)
Guernsey	3 ('01, '03, '15)	2 ('05, '11)	2 ('09, '17)
Isle of Wight	2 ('95, '11)		3 ('97, '99, '23)
Bermuda	2 ('13, '25)		
Faroe Islands	2 ('89, '91)		
(Anglesey) Ynys Môn	1 ('99)	5 ('89, '91, '97, '01, '23, '25)	
Isle of Man	1 ('17)	4 ('93, '99, '03, '15)	1 ('25)
Gibraltar	1 ('07)	1 ('95)	
Shetland	1 ('05)		
Greenland		2 ('13, '17)	
Åland		1 ('09)	2 ('89, '93)
Rhodes		1 ('07)	
(Outer Hebrides) Western Isles			2 ('05, '07)
Falkland Islands			1 ('13)
(Menorca) Minorca			1 ('15)

=== Performances by team ===
- Blue square indicates host

Year Participants	1989 5	1991 8	1993 8	1995 8	1997 9	1999 14	2001 12	2003 15	2005 10	2007 11	2009 16	2011 15	2013 4	2015 16	2017 16	2023 16	2025 10
Åland	3rd	4th	3rd	7th		6th			7th	7th	2nd	4th		9th	7th	13th	
Alderney								11th				14th		16th	15th		
Bermuda										4th			1st			4th	1st
Falkland Islands							11th		10th		16th	13th	3rd	12th	16th	14th	
Faroe Islands	1st	1st															
Frøya					7th	12th		13th		8th	15th		4th		14th	15th	10th
Gibraltar			8th	2nd	6th	11th	5th	6th		1st	9th	5th		10th			
Gotland						7th		9th		6th	11th	10th		14th	6th		
Greenland	4th	8th	4th	4th	9th	8th	9th	10th	8th		12th	11th	2nd	5th	2nd	8th	
Guernsey		6th		5th	4th	9th	1st	1st	2nd		3rd	2nd		1st	3rd	5th	
Gozo																6th	7th
Hitra					8th	13th								15th	12th		9th
Isle of Man			2nd	8th		2nd	7th	2nd	4th		4th	8th		2nd	1st	9th	3rd
Isle of Wight		7th	5th	1st	3rd	3rd	4th	4th			10th	1st		6th		3rd	
Jersey		3rd	1st	3rd	1st	4th	3rd	3rd		5th	1st	3rd		7th	5th	1st	4th
Menorca										9th	7th	7th		3rd	4th	12th	
Orkney							12th	8th	9th						9th	10th	5th
Rhodes						5th	6th	DNF		2nd	5th	DSQ					
Saaremaa						14th	10th	12th	6th	10th	14th	6th		13th	13th		
Saint Helena																16th	
Sark								14th									
Shetland	5th	5th	7th		5th	10th	8th	7th	1st		13th			4th	10th	7th	6th
Western Isles									3rd	3rd	8th	12th		11th	11th	11th	8th
Ynys Môn	2nd	2nd	5th	6th	2nd	1st	2nd	5th	5th	11th	6th	9th		8th	8th	2nd	2nd

=== Top goalscorers ===
Year	Player	Goals
1989	(Faroe Islands) Bergur Magnussen	11
1991	(Faroe Islands) Jens Erik Rasmussen	6
1993	(Jersey) Adam Greig	7
1995	(Isle of Wight) Adam Barsdell	4
1997	(Anglesey) Eifion Williams	6
1999	(Isle of Man) Peter Langridge	9
2001	(Isle of Man) Chris Higgins (Jersey) Daniel Craven	5
2003	(Gibraltar) Roy Chipolina (Gibraltar) Graham Alvez	9
2005	(Isle of Man) Peter Langridge (Isle of Man) Johnny Myers (Saare County) Martti Pukk	4
2007	?	
2009	(Gibraltar) Lee Casciaro (Guernsey) Ross Allen	5
2011	(Åland) Peter Lundberg	5
2013	(Greenland) Norsaq Lund Mathæussen	5
2015	(Guernsey) Dominic Heaume (Isle of Man) Ashley Webster (Shetland) Leighton Flaws (Shetland) Shane Jamieson	4
2017	(Isle of Man) Calum Morrissey	8
2023	(Isle of Wight) Jake Scrimshaw	7

== Women's tournament ==
=== Results ===
Year	Games	Host	Final			Third Place			Num. teams
Year	Games	Host	Gold	Score	Silver	Bronze	Score	Fourth place	Num. teams
2001 details	IX	Isle of Man	Faroe Islands	5–4	Åland	Jersey	3–2	Isle of Man	7
2003 details	X	Guernsey	Faroe Islands	5–2	Gotland	Jersey	3–2	Guernsey	8
2005 details	XI	Shetland	Faroe Islands	Round robin	Åland	Bermuda	Round robin	Isle of Man	6
2007 details	XII	Rhodes	Åland	3–0	Prince Edward Island	Bermuda	0–0 (p.s.o)	Isle of Man	11
2009 details	XIII	Åland	Åland	2–0	Gotland	Isle of Man	3–1	Isle of Wight	10
2011 details	XIV	Isle of Wight	Åland	5–1	Isle of Man	Greenland	1–0	Western Isles	10
2013 details	XV	Bermuda	Bermuda	0–0 (5-4 p)	Greenland	Hitra	—N/a		3
2015 details	XVI	Jersey	Jersey	1–0	Åland	Gotland	2–0	Isle of Man	11
2017 details	XVII	Gotland	Gotland	2–1	Isle of Man	Jersey	3–1	Isle of Wight	11
2019	XVII	Gibraltar	No football tournament held (see 2019 Inter Games Football Tournament)						
2023 details	XVIII	Guernsey	Bermuda	4–0	Western Isles	Isle of Man	3–1	Menorca	10
2025 details	XVIV	Orkney	Bermuda	1–1 (4-2 p)	Isle of Man	Western Isles	3–0	Gozo	11

=== Medalists ===
Team	Gold	Silver	Bronze
Åland	3 ('07, '09, 11')	3 ('01, '05, '15)	
Bermuda	3 ('13, '23, '25)		2 ('05, '07)
Faroe Islands	3 ('01, '03, '05)		
Gotland	1 ('17)	2 ('03, '09)	1 ('15)
Jersey	1 ('15)		3 (01', '03, '17)
Isle of Man		3 ('11, '17, '25)	2 ('09, '23)
Greenland		1 ('13)	1 ('11)
Prince Edward Island		1 ('07)	
(Outer Hebrides) Western isles		1 ('23)	1 ('25)
(Hitra Municipality) Hitra			1 ('13)

=== Performances by team ===
- Blue square indicates host

Year Participants	2001 7	2003 8	2005 6	2007 11	2009 10	2011 10	2013 3	2015 11	2017 11	2023 10
Åland Islands	2nd		2nd	1st	1st	1st		2nd	5th	7th
Bermuda			3rd	3rd			1st			1st
Faroe Islands	1st	1st	1st							
Gibraltar						10th		11th	10th	
Gotland		2nd		6th	2nd	7th		3rd	1st	
Greenland				8th	7th	3rd	2nd	9th	8th	
Guernsey	6th	4th	5th	7th	8th			8th		10th
(Hitra Municipality) Hitra					9th	9th	3rd	6th	9th	9th
Isle of Man	4th	8th	4th	4th	3rd	2nd		4th	2nd	3rd
Isle of Wight	5th	5th		5th	4th	5th		5th	4th	8th
Jersey	3rd	3rd		11th	6th	8th		1st	3rd	6th
Menorca									6th	4th
Prince Edward Island				2nd						
Rhodes		7th		10th						
(Saare County) Saaremaa					10th	6th				
Shetland			6th							
(Outer Hebrides) Western Isles				9th	5th	4th		7th	7th	2nd
(Anglesey) Ynys Môn	7th	6th						10th	11th	5th

=== Top goalscorers ===
Year	Player	Goals
2001	?	
2003		
2005	(Faroe Islands) Rannvá B. Andreasen	7
2007	?	
2009	(Isle of Man) Donna Shimmin	8
2011	(Åland) Adelina Engman (Isle of Man) Jade Burden (Isle of Man) Eleanor Gawne	5
2013	(Bermuda) Tschana Wade (Greenland) Laila Platoú	3
2015	?	
2017	(Isle of Wight) Gemma Woodford	6
2023	(Bermuda) Leilanni Nesbeth (Jersey) Eve Watson (Outer Hebrides) Sinead Macleod	4

== See also ==
- Non-FIFA international football
- N.F.-Board
