= Football at the 2005 Island Games – Women's tournament =

Women's Football at the Island Games 2005
Tournament details
- Host country: Shetland
- Dates: 10–15 July
- Teams: 6
- Venue: 9

Final positions
- Champions: Faroe Islands (3rd title)
- Runners-up: Åland
- Third place: Bermuda
- Fourth place: Isle of Man

Tournament statistics
- Matches played: 15
- Goals scored: 80 (5.33 per match)

The women's football tournament was contested as part of the programme for the 2005 Island Games which was hosted in Shetland from 10 to 15 July 2005. It was the third edition of the women's football tournament at the multi-sport event organised by the International Island Games Association.

The football tournament consisted of one group with each team competing against each other in a match, with the highest ranked team after all of the matches winning the tournament. The Faroe Islands would win the tournament for their third straight women's tournament win. The second and third placers in the tournament were Åland and Bermuda respectively.

== Background ==
A five-a-side youth football tournament was held at the inaugural games in 1985 held in Douglas, Isle of Man but football was completely absent from the programme at the 1987 Island Games held in Guernsey. The first women's football tournament was held at the 2001 Island Games in the Isle of Man. The Faroe Islands won the first two editions undefeated.

== Format ==
All of the six teams that competed in the women's tournament participated in one group. For the tournament, each team would compete against each other in a match. The highest ranked team after all of the matches were held would win the tournament.

=== Participants ===
- Åland
- Bermuda
- Faroe Islands
- Guernsey
- Isle of Man
- Shetland

== Group phase ==
Team	Pld	W	D	L	GF	GA	GD	Pts
Faroe Islands	5	5	0	0	33	2	+31	15
Åland	5	4	0	1	18	4	+14	12
Bermuda	5	2	0	3	14	6	+8	6
Isle of Man	5	2	0	3	8	11	−3	6
Guernsey	5	1	1	3	4	29	−25	4
Shetland	5	0	1	4	3	28	−25	1

10 July 2005
16:00

Isle of Man	0–6	Faroe Islands

Burra

10 July 2005
16:00

Åland	6–0	Guernsey

Sandwick

10 July 2005
16:00

Bermuda	5–0	Shetland

Fraser Park

11 July 2005
16:00

Bermuda	8–0	Guernsey

Sandwick

11 July 2005
16:00

Faroe Islands	3–1	Åland

Boddam

11 July 2005
16:00

Isle of Man	4–0	Shetland

Fraser Park

12 July 2005
16:00

Guernsey	2–2	Shetland

Seafield

12 July 2005
16:00

Bermuda	0–3	Faroe Islands

Cunningsburgh

12 July 2005
16:00

Åland	2–1	Isle of Man

Boddam

14 July 2005
16:00

Shetland	1–9	Faroe Islands

Fraser Park

14 July 2005
16:00

Guernsey	2–1	Isle of Man

Strom

14 July 2005
16:00

Bermuda	0–1	Åland

Harbison Park

15 July 2005
10:00

Isle of Man	2–1	Bermuda

Boddam

15 July 2005
10:00

Åland	8–0	Shetland

Burra

15 July 2005
11:00

Faroe Islands	12–0	Guernsey

Gilbertson Park

2005 Island Games winners

Third title

== Final rankings ==
The Faroe Islands would win the tournament with five wins. Åland won four matches and lost one, placing second. Bermuda would place second after winning two matches and losing one, tying with the Isle of Man but would rank higher due to their goal difference of +8 to -3.

Rank	Team
Gold medal	Faroe Islands
Silver medal	Åland
Bronze medal	Bermuda
4	Isle of Man
5	Guernsey
6	Shetland

== See also ==
- Men's Football at the 2005 Island Games
