= Saaremaa official football team =

Official football team of the island of Saaremaa in Estonia

Saaremaa
- Head coach: Arno Pijpers
- Home stadium: Kuressaare linnastaadion
First colours	Second colours

First international
- Greenland 4–1 Saare County (Väskinde, Gotland; 27 June 1999)

Biggest win
- Saare County 4–2 Frøya (Fardhem, Gotland; 29 June 2017); Saare County 2–0 Western Isles (Cowes, Isle of Wight; 28 June 2011)

Biggest defeat
- Saare County 1–6 Isle of Wight (Fårösund, Gotland; 28 June 1999)

The Saaremaa official football team is the official association football team of the island of Saaremaa in Estonia. Saaremaa are not members of FIFA or UEFA. They are not eligible to enter either the World Cup or European Championship.

They mainly play officially in Island Games. The team is mostly packed with players from FC Kuressaare and JK Sörve.

== Results and fixtures ==
=== 2020 ===
March 25th Friendly	Saare County	CANCELLED	New Caledonia	Kuressaare, Saaremaa, Estonia
18:30				Stadium: Kuressaare linnastaadion

== Selected Internationals ==
Date	Competition	Location	Opponent	Score
29 July 2017	2017 Island Games	Gotland	Frøya	4–2
27 June 2017	2017 Island Games	Gotland	Guernsey	1–1
26 June 2017	2017 Island Games	Gotland	Åland	0–0
25 June 2017	2017 Island Games	Gotland	Shetland	4–5
26 July 2015	2015 Island Games	Jersey	Gotland	3–2
30 June 2015	2015 Island Games	Jersey	Greenland	1–2
29 June 2015	2015 Island Games	Jersey	Menorca	0–3
28 June 2015	2015 Island Games	Jersey	Åland	1–2
30 July 2011	2011 Island Games	Isle of Wight	Gibraltar	0–4
29 June 2011	2011 Island Games	Isle of Wight	Åland	3–4 (p.s.o.)
28 June 2011	2011 Island Games	Isle of Wight	Western Isles	2–0
26 June 2011	2011 Island Games	Isle of Wight	Åland	3–3
2 July 2009	2009 Island Games	Åland	Shetland	2–3
30 June 2009	2009 Island Games	Åland	Rhodes	0–3
29 June 2009	2009 Island Games	Åland	Isle of Wight	1–5
28 June 2009	2009 Island Games	Åland	Jersey	0–1
5 July 2007	2007 Island Games	Rhodes	Menorca	1–4
2 July 2007	2007 Island Games	Rhodes	Frøya	2–3
30 June 2007	2007 Island Games	Rhodes	Rhodes	0–2
15 July 2005	2005 Island Games	Shetland	Ynys Môn	2–3
13 July 2005	2005 Island Games	Shetland	Shetland	0–0
12 July 2005	2005 Island Games	Shetland	Falkland Islands	1–2
11 July 2005	2005 Island Games	Shetland	Isle of Man	2–2
10 July 2005	2005 Island Games	Shetland	Åland	2–1
4 July 2003	2003 Island Games	Guernsey	Alderney	0–1
3 July 2003	2003 Island Games	Guernsey	Gotland	0–3
30 June 2003	2003 Island Games	Guernsey	Isle of Man	0–4
29 June 2003	2003 Island Games	Guernsey	Ynys Môn	0–2
13 July 2001	2001 Island Games	Isle of Man	Greenland	0–2
12 July 2001	2001 Island Games	Isle of Man	Orkney	2–1
9 July 2001	2001 Island Games	Isle of Man	Shetland	2–3
8 July 2001	2001 Island Games	Isle of Man	Ynys Môn	1–4
1 July 1999	1999 Island Games	Gotland	Hitra Municipality	1–2
29 June 1999	1999 Island Games	Gotland	Frøya	1–4
28 June 1999	1999 Island Games	Gotland	Isle of Wight	1–6
27 June 1999	1999 Island Games	Gotland	Greenland	1–4

== Tournaments ==
=== Island Games record ===
Year	Round	Position	GP	W	D	L	GS	GA
(Gotland) 1999	11th place match	12th	4	0	0	4	4	16
(Isle of Man) 2001	9th place match	10th	4	1	0	3	5	10
(Guernsey) 2003	11th place match	12th	4	0	0	4	0	10
(Shetland) 2005	5th place match	6th	5	1	2	2	7	8
(Rhodes) 2007	9th place match	10th	3	0	0	3	3	9
(Åland) 2009	13th place match	14th	4	0	0	4	3	12
(Isle of Wight) 2011	5th place match	6th	3	1	1	1	5	7
(Jersey) 2015	13th place match	13th	4	1	0	3	5	8
(Gotland) 2017	13th place match	13th	4	1	2	1	9	8
Total			35	5	5	25	41	88

== Squad 2009 ==
The following players were in the Island Games squad in 2009.

- (GK) Roland Kütt (FC Kuressaare)
- (GK) Rait Hansen (JK Sörve)
- Taavi Azarov (FC Kuressaare)
- Tõnu Ilves (JK Sörve)
- Märt Kluge (FC Kuressaare)
- Jaanis Kriska (FC Kuressaare)
- Rene Aljas (FC Kuressaare)
- Sander Laht (JK Sörve)
- Aivo Laul (FC Kuressaare)
- Kristjan Leedo (JK Sörve)
- Kalle Lepp (FC Kuressaare)
- Amor Luup (JK Sörve)
- Kaarel Mai (JK Sörve)
- Pelle Pohlak (FC Kuressaare)
- Mario Pruul (JK Sörve)
- Martti Pukk (FC Kuressaare)
- Urmas Rajaver (FC Kuressaare)
- Kristo Salumaa (JK Sörve)
- Elari Valmas (JK Sörve)
- Sander Viira (FC Kuressaare)
