= Football at the 2001 Island Games – Women's tournament =

Women's Football at the Island Games 2001
Tournament details
- Host country: Isle of Man
- Dates: 8 July – 13 July
- Teams: 7
- Venue(s): 9 (in 6 host cities)

Final positions
- Champions: Faroe Islands (1st title)
- Runners-up: Åland
- Third place: Jersey
- Fourth place: Isle of Man

Tournament statistics
- Matches played: 14
- Goals scored: 115 (8.21 per match)

The women's football tournament was contested as part of the programme for the 2001 Island Games which was hosted in the Isle of Man from 27 June to 3 July 2015. It was the first edition of the women's football tournament at the multi-sport event organised by the International Island Games Association.

The football tournament began with the first matches in the group stage on 8 July 2001 and ended with the gold medal match on 13 July 2001. The Faroe Islands and Åland contested the final. The Faroe Islands would win the final 5–4 with added overtime, winning the inaugural tournament and their first win in the competition. In the bronze medal match, Jersey defeated Isle of Man 2–3.

== Background ==
A five-a-side youth football tournament was held at the inaugural games in 1985 held in Douglas, Isle of Man but football was completely absent from the programme at the 1987 Island Games held in Guernsey. This edition of the Island Games would have its first women's tournament in football.

== Format ==
Seven teams took part in the competition. They were drawn into two round-robin groups, one group with four teams and one group of three teams. The top two best placed teams from each group and would qualify for the semifinals. The highest non-qualifier would automatically become the fifth-placer, while the two lowest ranked teams in the group stages would face each other in the sixth-place match. The winning team from each semifinal would contest the gold medal match and the losing team from each would contest the bronze medal match.

=== Participants ===
- Åland
- Faroe Islands
- Guernsey
- Isle of Man
- Isle of Wight
- Jersey
- Ynys Môn

== Games ==
=== Group 1 ===
Åland and Jersey would advance to the semifinals as they were the top two highest ranked teams in Group 1, with the former winning three matches and the latter winning two and losing one.

Team	Pld	W	D	L	GF	GA	GD	Pts
Åland	3	3	0	0	29	2	+27	9
Jersey	3	2	0	1	7	7	0	6
Isle of Wight	3	1	0	2	2	18	−16	3
Guernsey	3	0	0	3	2	13	−11	0

8 July 2001

Jersey	4–0	Isle of Wight

8 July 2001

Åland	9–1	Guernsey

9 July 2001

Isle of Wight	0–13	Åland

9 July 2001

Guernsey	0–2	Jersey

10 July 2001

Guernsey	1–2	Isle of Wight

10 July 2001

Jersey	1–7	Åland

=== Group 2 ===
The Faroe Islands and the Isle of Man would advance to the semifinals as they were the top two highest ranked teams in Group 1, with the former winning two matches and the latter winning one and losing one.

Team	Pld	W	D	L	GF	GA	GD	Pts
Faroe Islands	2	2	0	0	18	0	+18	6
Isle of Man	2	1	0	1	5	12	−7	3
Ynys Môn	2	0	0	2	1	12	−11	0

8 July 2001

Faroe Islands	11–0	Isle of Man

9 July 2001

Faroe Islands	7–0	Ynys Môn

10 July 2001

Isle of Man	5–1	Ynys Môn

== Placement play-off matches and semi-finals ==
=== Semi-finals ===
The Faroe Islands defeated Jersey in the first semi-final match, while Åland defeated the Isle of Man in the second semi-final match.

12 July 2001

Jersey	0–16	Faroe Islands

12 July 2001

Isle of Man	1–11	Åland

=== 6th place match ===
Guernsey defeated Ynys Môn in the sixth-place match.

12 July 2001

Guernsey	8–1	Ynys Môn

=== 5th place match ===
The Isle of Wight were automatically ranked in fifth-place after being the highest-ranked non-qualifier.

12 July 2001

Isle of Wight	W–W

== Finals ==
=== 3rd place match ===
Jersey defeated the Isle of Man in the bronze medal match.

13 July 2001

Isle of Man	2–3	Jersey

=== Final ===
The Faroe Islands defeated Åland in the gold medal match.

13 July 2001

Faroe Islands	5–4 (a.e.t.)	Åland

2001 Island Games Winners
Faroe Islands
First Title

== Final rankings ==
Rank	Team
Gold medal	Faroe Islands
Silver medal	Åland
Bronze medal	Jersey
4	Isle of Man
5	Isle of Wight
6	Guernsey
7	Ynys Môn

== See also ==
- Men's Football at the 2001 Island Games
