= Football at the 2013 Island Games – Women's tournament =

Women's Football at the Island Games 2013
Tournament details
- Host country: Bermuda
- Dates: 14–18 July
- Teams: 3
- Venue: 2 (in 1 host city)

Final positions
- Champions: Bermuda (1st title)
- Runners-up: Greenland
- Third place: Hitra Municipality

Tournament statistics
- Matches played: 5
- Top scorer(s): (Bermuda) Tschana Wade (Greenland) Laila Platoú (3 goals)

Football was contested as part of the programme for the 2013 Island Games which was hosted in Bermuda from 13 to 19 July 2013. It was the seventh edition of the women's football tournament at the multi-sport event organised by the International Island Games Association.

The football tournament began with the first matches in the group stage on 14 July 2013 and ended with the gold medal match on 18 July 2013. Greenland and hosts Bermuda contested the final. Bermuda defeated Greenland 5–4 on penalties to win the gold medal. As there were only three entrants, no bronze medal match was played and Hitra were awarded the bronze medal.

== Background ==
Football had been part of the Island Games programme following the debut of a senior men's competition at the 1989 Island Games in the Faroe Islands. Previously, a five-a-side youth football tournament was held at the inaugural games in 1985 held in Douglas, Isle of Man but football was completely absent from the programme at the 1987 Island Games held in Guernsey. The first women's tournament was held at the 2001 Island Games held on the Isle of Man.

The Faroe Islands and Åland held the record for gold medals having both won the women's football tournament three times. Åland were three-time defending champions after defeating the Isle of Man 5–1 in the gold medal match at the 2011 Island Games on the Isle of Wight. However, they would not be able to defend their title as they did not enter the women's football tournament at the 2013 Island Games.

== Format ==
A total of three teams took part in the competition. They contested a single round robin group which would determine the semi-finalists and the team receiving a bye to the gold medal match. The winning team from the group would receive the bye to the gold medal match while the teams finishing second and third would contest the semi-final. The loser of the semi-final would win the bronze medal.

=== Participants ===
- Bermuda
- Greenland
- Hitra Municipality

== Group Phase ==
Bermuda won both of their matches and received a bye to the gold medal match.

Rank	Nation	Pld	W	D	L	GF	GA	GD	Pts
1	Bermuda	2	2	0	0	11	2	+9	6
2	Greenland	2	1	0	1	5	6	–1	3
3	Hitra Municipality	2	0	0	2	2	10	–8	0

14 July 2013
18:00

Bermuda	5–1	Greenland
Bell 15'; Wade 52'; Furbert 55'; Nolan 63'; Furtado 76'	Report	Platoú 53'

Bermuda National Stadium, Hamilton

15 July 2013
18:00

Bermuda	6–1	Hitra Municipality
Wade 18', 68'; Nolan 29'; Bell 39'; Furtado 55'; Maybury 74'	Report	Kristoffersen 82'

Bermuda National Stadium, Hamilton

16 July 2013
18:00

Hitra Municipality	1–4	Greenland
Kristoffersen 26'	Report	Platoú 14'; Petersen 19'; Ugpernángitsok 39', 41'

Bermuda National Stadium, Hamilton

== Semi-final ==
Greenland defeated Hitra in the semi-final. Hitra were awarded the bronze medal.

17 July 2013
20:00

Greenland	2–1	Hitra Municipality
Platoú 22'; Egede 27'	Report	Røvik 89'

Bermuda Athletics Association, Hamilton

== Gold medal match ==
Bermuda defeated Greenland to win the gold medal.

18 July 2013
18:00

Bermuda	0–0	Greenland
	Report
Penalties
	5–4

Bermuda National Stadium, Hamilton

== See also ==
- Men's Football at the 2013 Island Games
