= Football at the 2003 Island Games – Women's tournament =

Women's Football at the Island Games 2003
Tournament details
- Host country: Guernsey
- Dates: 29 June – 4 July
- Teams: 8
- Venue: 6 (in 4 host cities)

Final positions
- Champions: Faroe Islands (2nd title)
- Runners-up: Gotland
- Third place: Jersey
- Fourth place: Guernsey

Tournament statistics
- Matches played: 16
- Goals scored: 96 (6 per match)

The 2003 Island Games on Guernsey was the 2nd edition in which a women's football tournament was played at the multi-games competition. It was contested by eight teams.

The Faroe Islands retained their title.

== Participants ==
- Faroe Islands
- Gotland
- Guernsey
- Isle of Man
- Isle of Wight
- Jersey
- Rhodes
- Ynys Môn

== Group phase ==
=== Group A ===
Team	Pld	W	D	L	GF	GA	GD	Pts
Gotland	3	3	0	0	23	2	+21	9
Guernsey	3	2	0	1	9	8	+1	6
Ynys Môn	3	1	0	2	2	15	−13	3
Rhodes	3	0	0	3	3	12	−9	0

29 June 2003

Rhodes	1–7	Gotland

Cambridge Park

29 June 2003

Guernsey	5–0	Ynys Môn

Cycling Ground

30 June 2003

Ynys Môn	0–10	Gotland

Cambridge Park

30 June 2003

Guernsey	3–2	Rhodes

Cambridge Park

1 July 2003

Ynys Môn	2–0	Rhodes

Cambridge Park

1 July 2003

Guernsey	1–6	Gotland

Cycling Ground

=== Group B ===
Team	Pld	W	D	L	GF	GA	GD	Pts
Faroe Islands	3	3	0	0	29	0	+29	9
Jersey	3	2	0	1	8	9	−1	6
Isle of Wight	3	1	0	2	3	15	−12	3
Isle of Man	3	0	0	3	1	17	−16	0

29 June 2003

Jersey	4–1	Isle of Wight

Victoria Avenue

29 June 2003

Isle of Man	0–11	Faroe Islands

Cambridge Park

30 June 2003

Jersey	4–1	Isle of Man

Victoria Avenue

30 June 2003

Isle of Wight	0–11	Faroe Islands

Cycling Ground

1 July 2003

Isle of Wight	2–0	Isle of Man

Victoria Avenue

1 July 2003

Jersey	0–7	Faroe Islands

Cambridge Park

== Final stage ==
=== 7th/8th place match ===
3 July 2003

Rhodes	4–0	Isle of Man

Blanche Pierre Lane

=== 5th/6th place match ===
3 July 2003

Ynys Môn	0–2	Isle of Wight

Alderney

=== 3rd/4th place match ===
4 July 2003

Guernsey	2–3	Jersey

Cycling Ground

=== Final ===
4 July 2003

Faroe Islands	5–2	Gotland

North Field

2003 Island Games Winners
Faroe Islands
Second Title

== Final rankings ==
Rank	Team
Gold medal	Faroe Islands
Silver medal	Gotland
Bronze medal	Jersey
4	Guernsey
5	Isle of Wight
6	Ynys Môn
7	Rhodes
8	Isle of Man

== See also ==
Men's Football at the 2003 Island Games
