= Menorca football team =

Men's association football team

Menorca
- Head coach: Gabriel Llabrés and Juan Millán
- FIFA code: N/A
First colours	Second colours

First international
- Menorca 0–1 Jersey (Kalythies, Rhodes; 30 June 2007)

Biggest win
- Menorca 6–0 Greenland (Sund, Åland; 29 June 2009); Menorca 6–0 Alderney (Fårösund, Gotland; 27 June 2017)

Biggest defeat
- Jersey 4–0 Menorca (Guernsey; 10 July 2023)

The Menorca football team represents the island of Menorca, one of the Balearic Islands in Spain. As a part of Spain, Menorca is not affiliated with FIFA or UEFA although players from Menorca are eligible to play for the Spain national football team.

Menorca is a member of the International Island Games Association and has taken part in the Island Games. The team made its debut at the 2007 Island Games held in Rhodes, Greece. At the 2015 Island Games, Menorca achieved their best finish after winning the bronze medal.

== History ==
The Menorca Island Games Association joined the International Island Games Association in 2005 allowing the island to compete from the 2007 Island Games held in Rhodes, Greece.

Menorca made its debut in the men's football competition on 30 June 2007 at the Kalythies Stadium in Kalythies, Rhodes, losing 1–0 to Jersey. They lost their other group stage match 2–1 against Gibraltar but defeated Ynys Môn 6–1 and Saare County 4–1 to finish 9th overall.

They returned at the 2009 Island Games held in Åland and built on their previous experience. Despite going through the group stage undefeated, they missed out on a place in the semi-finals after a draw with hosts Åland. Menorca finished seventh overall after defeating the Western Isles 4–1 in their placement play-off match.

At the 2011 Island Games held on the Isle of Wight, Menorca were again eliminated in the group stage. Their match against Rhodes was awarded in their favour after Rhodes were disqualified for their poor disciplinary record in the first two group matches. Menorca defeated the Isle of Man on penalties to again finish seventh.

Menorca missed the 2013 Island Games in Bermuda but returned for the 2015 Island Games in Jersey. Menorca won their group on goal difference to advance to the semi-finals for the first time. After a defeat to Guernsey in the semi-finals, Menorca recorded a 1–0 victory over Shetland to win the bronze medal.

They came close to retaining their bronze medal at the 2017 Island Games in Gotland. A 6–0 win against Alderney in their final group match saw them win the group on goal difference by a single goal. They lost to Greenland on penalties in the semi-finals and missed out on a medal after a 1–0 loss to Guernsey in the bronze medal match.

Menorca did not take part in the 2019 Inter Games Football Tournament in Angelsey, held as a replacement for the 2019 Island Games which did not have football on the programme due to a lack of facilities in Gibraltar.

They returned for the 2023 Island Games in Guernsey but recorded their worst overall result. After winning their opening game against Saint Helena, they lost their remaining group phase matches before losing their placement play-off 2–1 against the Western Isles as they finished 12th.

Menorca withdrew from the 2025 Island Games in Orkney due to the cost of travel and accommodation.

== Island Games record ==
Tournament	Date	Venue	Opponent	Score	Position
2007 Island Games	Jun 30 2007	Rhodes	Jersey	0–1	9th
2007 Island Games	Jul 2 2007	Rhodes	Gibraltar	1–2	9th
2007 Island Games	Jul 4 2007	Rhodes	Ynys Môn	6–1	9th
2007 Island Games	Jul 5 2007	Rhodes	Saare County	4–1	9th
2009 Island Games	Jun 28 2009	Åland	Shetland	2–2	7th
2009 Island Games	Jun 29 2009	Åland	Greenland	6–0	7th
2009 Island Games	Jun 30 2009	Åland	Åland	1–1	7th
2009 Island Games	Jul 3 2009	Åland	Western Isles	4–1	7th
2011 Island Games	Jun 26 2011	Isle of Wight	Jersey	0–2	7th
2011 Island Games	Jun 27 2011	Isle of Wight	Greenland	3–2	7th
2011 Island Games	Jun 28 2011	Isle of Wight	Rhodes	3–0 (awarded)	7th
2011 Island Games	Jun 30 2011	Isle of Wight	Isle of Man	2–2 (3–1p)	7th
2015 Island Games	Jun 28 2015	Jersey	Greenland	2–2	3rd
2015 Island Games	Jun 29 2015	Jersey	Saare County	3–0	3rd
2015 Island Games	Jun 30 2015	Jersey	Åland	3–1	3rd
2015 Island Games	Jul 2 2015	Jersey	Guernsey	1–2	3rd
2015 Island Games	Jul 3 2015	Jersey	Shetland	1–0	3rd
2017 Island Games	Jun 25 2017	Gotland	Orkney	1–0	4th
2017 Island Games	Jun 26 2017	Gotland	Jersey	3–3	4th
2017 Island Games	Jun 27 2017	Gotland	Alderney	6–0	4th
2017 Island Games	Jun 29 2017	Gotland	Greenland	1–1 (1–3p)	4th
2017 Island Games	Jun 30 2017	Gotland	Guernsey	0–1	4th
2023 Island Games	July 9 2023	Guernsey	Saint Helena	5–0	12th
2023 Island Games	July 10 2023	Guernsey	Jersey	0–4	12th
2023 Island Games	July 11 2023	Guernsey	Gozo	0–1	12th
2023 Island Games	July 13 2023	Guernsey	Western Isles	1–2	12th

== Honours ==
- Island Games
  - Bronze medal (1): 2015
