= Orkney representative football team =

Association football team in Orkney, Scotland

Orkney
- Association: Orkney Amateur Football Association
- Head coach: Karl Adamson
- Home stadium: The Pickaquoy Centre, formerly Bignold Park
First colours	Second colours

First international
- Orkney 2–3 Shetland (Kirkwall, Orkney; 7 May 1919)

Biggest win
- Orkney 7–1 Shetland (Kirkwall, Orkney; 30 June 1972)

Biggest defeat
- Jersey 12–0 Orkney (Douglas, Isle of Man; 8 July 2001); Guernsey 12–0 Orkney (Saint Sampson, Guernsey; 30 June 2003)

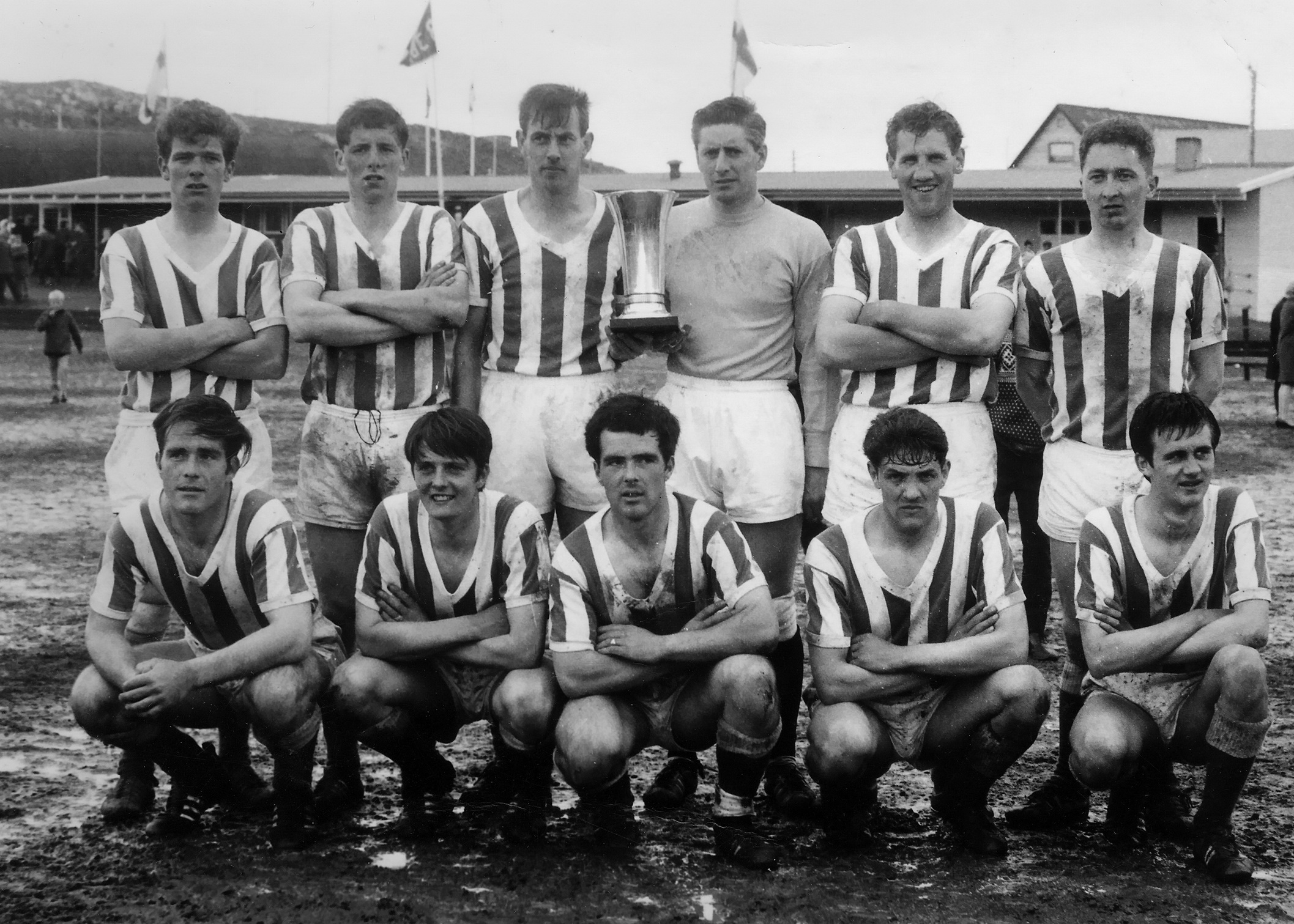
Orkney representative football team in 1968 against the Faroe Islands

The Orkney football team represents the Orkney Islands archipelago in northern Scotland. As a part of Scotland, Orkney is not affiliated with FIFA or UEFA although players from Orkney are eligible to play for the Scotland national football team.

Formed in 1913, the team has played rivals Shetland annually for the Milne Cup, winning the competition 38 times. Orkney also won the North Atlantic Cup – a tournament played between Orkney, Shetland and the Faroe Islands.

Since 2001, the team has also contested the Island Games.

== History ==
The Milne Cup was founded in 1908. Donated by Bailie Milne, the first chairman of Aberdeen F.C., the trophy was originally intended as an annual competition between Lerwick and Scalloway – two settlements in Shetland. However, it was instead contested by Lerwick and Kirkwall – the largest settlement in Orkney. Lerwick won the first match 5–1 on 7 May 1908. Over the first five editions, Lerwick won the trophy twice while Kirkwall won it twice and retained it once following a draw.

In 1913, the tournament became an annual competition between Orkney and Shetland. It was contested a further two times – both won by Orkney – before World War I which saw the tournament's suspension.

Shetland were the stronger team in the inter-war years, lifting the trophy 11 times to Orkney's 10 between 1919 and 1939. The tournament was again suspended during World War II.

Okrney won the Milne Cup five times and retained it once in the first seven editions after World War II. A record score was achieved in 1963 when 16 goals were shared between the two teams, Shetland winning 9–7 after extra time.

From 1935 to 1967, Shetland had also played the Faroe Islands for the Adam Shield. A new competition – the North Atlantic Cup – was introduced in 1968 which would see Orkney, Shetland and the Faroe Islands playing each other annually for the next five years. The tournament came down to the final matches in June 1973. The Faroe Islands defeated Shetland 5–1 on 13 June to eliminate Shetland from the competition. Orkney then won the final match on 18 June against the Faroe Islands to win the cup.

Shetland went 13 years unbeaten in the Milne Cup between 1991 and 2003. Orkney finally broke the streak with a 5–4 win after extra time on 31 July 2004.

The Orkney Island Games Association joined the International Island Games Association in 1985 allowing the island to compete from the inaugural 1985 Island Games held on the Isle of Man.

They made their debut in the men's football competition at the 2001 Island Games on the Isle of Man. They lost their opening match 12–0 against Jersey before going on to lose all four matches and finishing 12th overall.

At the 2003 Island Games in Guernsey, Orkney recorded another double-figures defeat after losing 10–0 to hosts Guernsey. Overall, they fared better and finished eighth.

Orkney were again eliminated at the group stage at the 2005 Island Games in Shetland as they finished ninth overall.

They were absent from the subsequent five games and didn't return until the 2017 Island Games in Gotland. They again finished ninth after defeating Shetland in their placement play-off match.

Angelsey hosted the 2019 Inter Games Football Tournament – a replacement for the 2019 Island Games which did not have football on the programme due to a lack of facilities in Gibraltar. Orkney finished eighth after losing to Alderney in their placement play-off match.

They returned for the 2023 Island Games in Guernsey. Orkney were again eliminated at the group stage and finished 10th overall.

Following Orkney's win at the 2021 Milne Cup, Shetland have won the tournament three times in a row.

== Tournament records ==
=== Island Games ===
Island Games record
Year	Round	Position	GP	W	D	L	GS	GA
(Faroe Islands) 1989	Did not enter							
(Åland) 1991	Did not enter							
(Isle of Wight) 1993	Did not enter							
(Gibraltar) 1995	Did not enter							
(Jersey) 1997	Did not enter							
(Gotland) 1999	Did not enter							
(Isle of Man) 2001	Group stage	12th	4	0	0	4	2	20
(Guernsey) 2003	Group stage	8th	5	1	0	4	5	30
(Shetland) 2005	Group stage	9th	5	1	0	4	7	12
(Rhodes) 2007	Did not enter							
(Åland) 2009	Did not enter							
(Isle of Wight) 2011	Did not enter							
(Bermuda) 2013	Did not enter							
(Jersey) 2015	Did not enter							
(Gotland) 2017	Group stage	9th	4	2	0	2	6	5
(Gibraltar) 2019 (Note: No football tournament held. (Replaced by 2019 Inter Games Football Tournament in Anglesey).)	Group stage	8th	4	1	0	3	4	11
(Guernsey) 2023	Group stage	10th	4	1	1	2	6	7
(Orkney) 2025	Group stage	5th	4	3	0	1	10	7
!Total	Group stage	7/18	30	9	1	20	40	92

=== 2019 Inter Games Football Tournament ===
Position	GP	W	D	L	GF	GA	GD
Eighth	4	1	0	3	4	11	–7

=== North Atlantic Cup ===
Year	Position	GP	W	D	L	GF	GA	GD	Points
1968–1973	1st	8	4	2	2	20	13	7	10

=== Milne Cup ===
Includes matches between Kirkwall and Lerwick

W	D	L	GF	GA	GD
39	6	57	184	230	–46
