= Football at the 1989 Island Games =

Men's Football at the Island Games 1989
Tournament details
- Host country: Faroe Islands
- Dates: 6–12 July
- Teams: 5
- Venue: 8 (in 8 host cities)

Final positions
- Champions: Faroe Islands (1st title)
- Runners-up: Ynys Môn
- Third place: Åland
- Fourth place: Greenland

Tournament statistics
- Matches played: 10
- Goals scored: 44 (4.4 per match)
- Top scorer(s): (Faroe Islands) Bergur Magnussen (11 goals)

Football was contested as part of the programme for the 1989 Island Games which was hosted in the Faroe Islands from 5 to 13 July 1989. It was the inaugural edition of the men's football tournament at the multi-sport event organised by the International Island Games Association.

The football tournament began with the first round of matches in the group stage on 6 July 1989 and ended with the final round of matches on 12 July 1989. The Faroe Islands won the gold medal after winning all four of their group matches. Ynys Môn won silver and Åland won bronze.

== Background ==
A five-a-side youth football tournament was held at the inaugural games in 1985 held in Douglas, Isle of Man but football was completely absent from the programme at the 1987 Island Games held in Guernsey.

== Format ==
The five teams played a single round robin group where the medals would be decided on the final group standings.

=== Participants ===
- Åland
- Faroe Islands
- Greenland
- Shetland
- Ynys Môn

== Venues ==
The matches were played at venues across the Faroe Islands including Gøtu, Vágur, Tórshavn, Sandavágur, Fuglafjørður, Klaksvík, Sandur, Leirvík.

== Overview ==
The competition began on 6 July 1989. The Faroe Islands recorded a comfortable 6–0 win against Ynys Môn while Greenland defeated Shetland. Two days later, the Faroe Islands defeated Shetland 4–0 and Ynys Môn won a closely contested match 5–4 against Åland. On 9 July 1989, a hat-trick from Jens Erik Rasmussen helped the Faroe Islands to a 3–0 win against Greenland and Shetland were mathematically eliminated from medal contention after a 2–0 loss against Åland. With two rounds of matches to play, the Faroe Islands were assured of at least a bronze medal and were in pole position for the gold medal while Åland, Greenland and Ynys Môn were all tied on two points.

On 11 July 1989, Åland and Ynys Môn recorded 3–0 wins against Greenland and Shetland respectively. As a result, Shetland would finish fifth having played and lost all four of their games while the four teams in action in the final round of matches would all have something to play for. The following day, the Faroe Islands sealed their gold medal with a 7–1 victory against Åland. Ynys Môn won he silver medal with a 1–0 against Greenland which meant Åland won bronze.

== Final rankings ==
Pos	Team	Pld	W	D	L	GF	GA	GD	Pts	
1	Faroe Islands	4	4	0	0	20	1	+19	8	Gold medal winner
2	Ynys Môn	4	3	0	1	9	10	−1	6	Silver medal winner
3	Åland	4	2	0	2	10	12	−2	4	Bronze medal winner
4	Greenland	4	1	0	3	4	8	−4	2	
5	Shetland	4	0	0	4	1	13	−12	0	

== Matches ==
6 July

Faroe Islands	6–0	Ynys Môn
Magnussen 2', 83', 86', 89'; Jarnskor 15'; Reynheim 26'

Sarpugerði, Norðragøta
Attendance: 800
Referee: Niklas á Liðarenda

6 July

Greenland	4–1	Shetland

Vágur

8 July

Faroe Islands	4–0	Shetland
Mørkøre 17'; Rasmussen 54'; Magnussen 77'; Nielsen 89'

Gundadalur, Tórshavn
Attendance: 1,300
Referee: Kim Ejdesgaard

8 July

Åland	4–5	Ynys Môn
G. Börman 5': Unknown 10' (o.g.); B. Danielsson 16'; S. Fonsell 65'		Gray 31', 47'; Welsh 34'; Roberts 41'; Owen 86'

Sandavágur

9 July

Faroe Islands	3–0	Greenland
Rasmussen 48', 78', 82'

Í Fløtugerði, Fuglafjørður
Attendance: 2,500
Referee: Herman Midjord

9 July

Åland	2–0	Shetland
K. Nylund 54'; C. Mattson 55'

Klaksvík

11 July

Åland	3–0	Greenland

Sandur

11 July

Ynys Môn	3–0	Shetland
Gray 26'; Roberts 50'; Malcolmson 83' (o.g.)

Leirvík

12 July

Faroe Islands	7–1	Åland
Magnussen 25', 50', 61', 62', 70', 78'; Danielsen 56'		Matsson 41'

Gundadalur, Tórshavn
Attendance: 2,000
Referee: Jóhan Carl Dam

12 July

Ynys Môn	1–0	Greenland

Klaksvík
