= Football at the 2007 Island Games – Men's tournament =

Men's Football at the Island Games 2007
Tournament details
- Host country: Rhodes
- Dates: 30 June – 6 July
- Teams: 11
- Venue: 10 (in 10 host cities)

Final positions
- Champions: Gibraltar (1st title)
- Runners-up: Rhodes
- Third place: Western Isles
- Fourth place: Bermuda

Tournament statistics
- Matches played: 21
- Goals scored: 62 (2.95 per match)

Football was contested as part of the programme for the 2007 Island Games which was hosted in Rhodes from 30 June to 6 July 2007. It was the 10th edition of the men's football tournament at the multi-sport event organised by the International Island Games Association.

The football tournament began with the first matches in the group stage on 30 June 2007 and ended with the gold medal match on 5 July 2007. Gibraltar and hosts Rhodes contested the final. Gibraltar defeated Rhodes 4–0 to win the gold medal. In the bronze medal match, the Western Isles defeated the Bermuda 1–0.

== Background ==
Football had been part of the Island Games programme following the debut of a senior men's competition at the 1989 Island Games in the Faroe Islands. Previously, a five-a-side youth football tournament was held at the inaugural games in 1985 held in Douglas, Isle of Man but football was completely absent from the programme at the 1987 Island Games held in Guernsey.

The Faroe Islands, Jersey and Guernsey held the record for gold medals having won the men's football tournament twice although the Faroe Islands have not competed since their win at the 1991 Island Games in Åland. Shetland were the defending champions after defeating Guernsey 2–0 in the gold medal match as hosts at the 2005 Island Games, preventing Guernsey from winning a third consecutive gold medal.

== Format ==
A total of 11 teams took part in the competition. They were drawn into four groups – three single round robin groups of three teams and one double round robin group of two teams. The winning team from each group would contest the semi-finals which would decide the teams contesting the gold and bronze medal matches. Play-off placement matches were held for the teams finishing second and third in each group – the runners-up would contest the fifth to eighth semi-finals and the third-placed teams contested the ninth to 11th semi-finals.

=== Participants ===
- Åland
- Bermuda U23
- Rhodes
- Jersey
- Menorca
- Frøya
- Gibraltar
- Saare County
- Gotland
- Western Isles
- Ynys Môn

== Group Phase ==
=== Group A ===
Gibraltar won the group to progress to the semi-finals.

Rank	Nation	Pld	W	D	L	GF	GA	Pts	GD
1	Gibraltar	2	1	1	0	3	2	4	+1
2	Jersey	2	1	1	0	2	1	4	+1
3	Menorca	2	0	0	2	1	3	0	-2

30 June

Menorca	0–1	Jersey

Kalithies

1 July

Jersey	1–1	Gibraltar
Peter Vincenti		Chipolina 85'

Ialyssos

2 July

Gibraltar	2–1	Menorca

Embona

=== Group B ===
Bermuda U23 won the group on goal difference to progress to the semi-finals.

Rank	Nation	Pld	W	D	L	GF	GA	Pts	GD
1	Bermuda U23	2	1	0	1	3	2	3	+1
2	Åland	2	1	0	1	4	4	3	0
3	Ynys Môn	2	1	0	1	4	5	3	-1

30 June

Bermuda U23	1–2	Ynys Môn

Maritsa

1 July

Åland	0–2	Bermuda U23

Diagoras

2 July

Ynys Môn	2–4	Åland

Archangelos

=== Group C ===
Rhodes won both of their games to progress to the semi-finals.

Rank	Nation	Pld	W	D	L	GF	GA	Pts	GD
1	Rhodes	2	2	0	0	5	1	6	+4
2	Frøya	2	1	0	1	4	5	3	-1
3	Saare County	2	0	0	2	2	5	0	-3

30 June

Rhodes	2–0	Saare County

Diagoras

1 July

Frøya	1–3	Rhodes

Paradisi

2 July

Saare County	2–3	Frøya

Kalithies

=== Group D ===
The Western Isles won both of their games to progress to the semi-finals.

Rank	Nation	Pld	W	D	L	GF	GA	Pts	GD
1	Western Isles	2	2	0	0	5	2	6	+3
2	Gotland	2	0	0	2	2	5	0	-3

1 July

Western Isles	2–1	Gotland

Archangelos

2 July

Gotland	1–3	Western Isles

Paradisi

== Placement play-off matches ==
=== Ninth to 11th semi-final ===
Menorca defeated Ynys Môn in the ninth to 11th semi-final.

4 July

Menorca	6–1	Ynys Môn

Archangelos

=== Fifth to eighth semi-finals ===
Jersey defeated Åland and Gotland defeated Frøya in the fifth to eighth semi-finals.

4 July

Jersey	1–0	Åland
Paul Aitken 75'

Ialyssos

4 July

Frøya	0–3	Gotland

Maritsa

=== Ninth-place match ===
Menorca defeated Saare County in the ninth-place match.

5 July

Menorca	4–1	Saare County

Ialyssos

=== Seventh-place match ===
Åland defeated Frøya in the seventh-place match.

5 July

Åland	3–1	Frøya

Kalythies

=== Fifth-place match ===
Jersey defeated Gotland in the fifth-place match.

5 July

Jersey	1–0	Gotland
Peter Vincenti

Embona

== Semi-finals ==
Gibraltar defeated Bermuda U23 and Rhodes defeated the Western Isles in the semi-finals.

4 July

Gibraltar	2–0	Bermuda U23

Diagoras

4 July

Rhodes	1–0	Western Isles

Paradisi

== Bronze medal match ==
The Western Isles defeated Bermuda U23 in the bronze medal match.

5 July

Bermuda U23	0–1	Western Isles

Maritsa

== Gold medal match ==
Gibraltar defeated Rhodes in the gold medal match.

5 July

Gibraltar	4–0	Rhodes

Diagoras

== Final rankings ==
Rank	Team
Gold medal	Gibraltar
Silver medal	Rhodes
Bronze medal	Western Isles
4	Bermuda U23
5	Jersey
6	Gotland
7	Åland
8	Frøya
9	Menorca
10	Saare County
11	Ynys Môn

== See also ==
- Women's Football at the 2007 Island Games
