= Football at the 1999 Island Games =

Men's Football at the Island Games 1999
Tournament details
- Host country: Gotland
- Dates: 22 June – 7 July
- Teams: 14
- Venue: (in 8 host cities)

Final positions
- Champions: Ynys Môn (1st title)
- Runners-up: Isle of Man
- Third place: Isle of Wight
- Fourth place: Jersey

Tournament statistics
- Matches played: 30
- Goals scored: 156 (5.2 per match)
- Top scorer(s): (Isle of Man) Peter Langridge (8 goals)

Football was contested as part of the programme for the 1999 Island Games which was hosted in Gotland from 26 June to 2 July 1999. It was the sixth edition of the men's football tournament at the multi-sport event organised by the International Island Games Association.

The football tournament began with the first matches in the group stage on 27 June 1999 and ended with the gold medal match on 2 July 1999. Ynys Môn and the Isle of Man contested the final. Ynys Môn defeated the Isle of Man 1–0 to win the gold medal. In the bronze medal match, the Isle of Wight defeated defending champions Jersey 2–0.

== Background ==
A five-a-side youth football tournament was held at the inaugural games in 1985 held in Douglas, Isle of Man but football was completely absent from the programme at the 1987 Island Games held in Guernsey. The first men's football tournament was held at the 1989 Island Games in the Faroe Islands. The Faroe Islands won the first two editions undefeated but have not competed since their win at the 1991 Island Games in Åland. Jersey were the defending champions after defeating hosts Ynys Môn 1–0 in the gold medal match as hosts at the 1997 Island Games.

== Format ==
A total of 14 teams took part in the competition. They were drawn into four single round robin groups – two of four teams and two of three teams. The winning team from each group would contest the semi-finals which would decide the teams contesting the gold and bronze medal matches. Play-off placement matches were held for the teams finishing second, third and fourth in each group – the runners-up would contest the fifth to eighth semi-finals, the third-placed teams contested the ninth to 12th semi-finals and the fourth-placed teams contested the 13th-place match.

=== Participants ===
- Åland
- Frøya
- Gibraltar
- Gotland
- Greenland
- Guernsey
- Hitra Municipality
- Isle of Man
- Isle of Wight
- Jersey
- Rhodes
- Saare County
- Shetland
- Ynys Môn

== Group Phase ==
=== Group 1 ===
Jersey won both of their games to progress to the semi-finals.

Pos	Team	Pld	W	D	L	GF	GA	GD	Pts	Qualification
1	Jersey	2	2	0	0	6	1	+5	6	Qualification for the semi-finals
2	Åland	2	1	0	1	2	2	0	3	Qualification for the fifth to eighth semi-finals
3	Gibraltar	2	0	0	2	2	7	−5	0	Qualification for the ninth to 12th semi-finals

27 June

Jersey	1–0	Åland
Muddyman

Visby

28 June

Åland	2–1	Gibraltar
Lyyski; Niskala		Green

Väskinde

29 June

Gibraltar	1–5	Jersey
Green		Lumsden; Brodie (3); Reilly

Fardhem

=== Group 2 ===
The Isle of Man won the group on goal difference to progress to the semi-finals.

Pos	Team	Pld	W	D	L	GF	GA	GD	Pts	Qualification
1	Isle of Man	3	2	1	0	19	5	+14	7	Qualification for the semi-finals
2	Gotland	3	2	1	0	19	6	+13	7	Qualification for the fifth to eighth semi-finals
3	Shetland	3	1	0	2	6	6	0	3	Qualification for the ninth to 12th semi-finals
4	Hitra Municipality	3	0	0	3	2	29	−27	0	Qualification for the 13th-place match

27 June

Gotland	12–1	Hitra Municipality
Olsson; F. Larsson (2); H. Larsson; Nilsson; Molin (5); Harring; T. Larsson		Fiskvik

Gutavallen

27 June

Isle of Man	2–1	Shetland

Dalhem

28 June

Hitra Municipality	0–13	Isle of Man
		Corkill; Dixon; Hawley; Langridge (7); Duggan; Gartland (2)

Fardhem

28 June

Shetland	1–3	Gotland
Williamson		Backeus; T. Larsson; Hansson

Visby

29 June

Gotland	4–4	Isle of Man
F.Larsson (2); Hansson; Ahlqvist		Hurt; Langridge; Gartland (2)

Visby

29 June

Shetland	4–1	Hitra Municipality
Williamson; Bray; Pearson (2)		Saetherbo

Fårösund

=== Group 3 ===
The Isle of Wight won all three of their games to progress to the semi-finals.

Pos	Team	Pld	W	D	L	GF	GA	GD	Pts	Qualification
1	Isle of Wight	3	3	0	0	19	5	+14	9	Qualification for the semi-finals
2	Greenland	3	2	0	1	9	9	0	6	Qualification for the fifth to eighth semi-finals
3	Frøya	3	1	0	2	7	10	−3	3	Qualification for the ninth to 12th semi-finals
4	Saare County	3	0	0	3	3	14	−11	0	Qualification for the 13th-place match

27 June

Isle of Wight	6–2	Frøya
Raggett (3); Dent (3)		Furberg; Måsöval

Fardhem

27 June

Greenland	4–1	Saare County
Davidsen (2); Nielsen; Overballe		Piehl

Väskinde

28 June

Frøya	1–3	Greenland
Pettersen		Nielsen; Petersen; Hansen

Dalhem

28 June

Saare County	1–6	Isle of Wight
Azarov		Miller; Barsdell (2); Plenty (2); Dent

Fårösund

29 June

Isle of Wight	7–2	Greenland
Barsdell; Plenty (2); Dent (2); Sunsburg; Young		Enggaard; Rosbach

Väskinde

29 June

Saare County	1–4	Frøya
Piehl		Måsoval (3); Skarpnes

Dalhem

=== Group 4 ===
Ynys Môn won the group on goals scored to progress to the semi-finals.

Pos	Team	Pld	W	D	L	GF	GA	GD	Pts	Qualification
1	Ynys Môn	2	0	2	0	2	2	0	2	Qualification for the semi-finals
2	Rhodes	2	0	2	0	1	1	0	2	Qualification for the fifth to eighth semi-finals
3	Guernsey	2	0	2	0	1	1	0	2	Qualification for the ninth to 12th semi-finals

27 June

Ynys Môn	1–1	Rhodes

Fårösund

28 June

Rhodes	0–0	Guernsey

Visby

29 June

Guernsey	1–1	Ynys Môn
Tippett		Hughes

Visby

== Placement play-off matches ==
=== 13th-place match ===
Hitra Municipality defeated Saare County in the 13th-place match.

1 July

Hitra Municipality	2–1	Saare County
Fiskvik; Lervik		Mölder

Dalhem

=== Ninth to 12th semi-finals ===
Guernsey defeated Frøya and Shetland defeated Gibraltar in the ninth to 12th semi-finals.

1 July

Guernsey	4–2	Frøya
		Ervik; Måsöval

Väskinde

1 July

Shetland	3–2	Gibraltar
Williamson (2); Peterson		Olivero (2)

Visby

=== Fifth to eighth semi-finals ===
Rhodes defeated Greenland and Åland defeated Gotland in the fifth to eighth semi-finals.

1 July

Greenland	0–2	Rhodes
		Galands; Karikis

Fårösund

1 July

Åland	4–1	Gotland
Oujlouq (2); Lyyski; Sjölund		Ahlqvist

Fardhem

=== 11th-place match ===
Gibraltar defeated Frøya in the 11th-place match.

2 July

Gibraltar	5–1	Frøya

Visby

=== Ninth-place match ===
Guernsey defeated Shetland in the ninth-place match.

2 July

Guernsey	6–5	Shetland

Visby

=== Seventh-place match ===
Gotland defeated Greenland in the seventh-place match.

1 July

Gotland	7–2	Greenland

Norrbacka

=== Fifth-place match ===
Rhodes defeated Åland in the fifth-place match.

2 July

Rhodes	3–2	Åland

Visby

== Semi-finals ==
Ynys Môn defeated the Isle of Wight and the Isle of Man defeated Jersey in the semi-finals.

1 July

Isle of Wight	1–3	Ynys Môn
Plenty		Parry; Hazelaar; Rowlands

Visby

1 July

Isle of Man	1–0	Jersey
Langridge

Gutavallen, Visby

== Bronze medal match ==
The Isle of Wight defeated Jersey in the bronze medal match.

2 July

Isle of Wight	2–0	Jersey

Gutavallen, Visby

== Gold medal match ==
Ynys Môn defeated the Isle of Man in the gold medal match.

2 July

Ynys Môn	1–0	Isle of Man

Gutavallen, Visby

== Final rankings ==
Rank	Team
Gold medal	Ynys Môn
Silver medal	Isle of Man
Bronze medal	Isle of Wight
4	Jersey
5	Rhodes
6	Åland
7	Gotland
8	Greenland
9	Guernsey
10	Shetland
11	Gibraltar
12	Frøya
13	Hitra Municipality
14	Saare County
