= Football at the 2001 Island Games – Men's tournament =

Men's Football at the Island Games 2001
Tournament details
- Host country: Isle of Man
- Dates: 8–13 July
- Teams: 12
- Venues: 9 (in 6 host cities)

Final positions
- Champions: Guernsey (1st title)
- Runners-up: Ynys Môn
- Third place: Jersey
- Fourth place: Isle of Wight

Tournament statistics
- Matches played: 24
- Goals scored: 89 (3.71 per match)
- Top scorer(s): (Isle of Man) Chris Higgins (Jersey) Daniel Craven (5 goals)

Football was contested as part of the programme for the 2001 Island Games which was hosted in the Isle of Man from 7 to 13 July 2001. It was the seventh edition of the men's football tournament at the multi-sport event organised by the International Island Games Association.

The football tournament began with the first matches in the group stage on 8 July 2001 and ended with the gold medal match on 13 July 2001. Guernsey and defending champions Ynys Môn contested the final. Following a goalless draw, Guernsey defeated Ynys Môn 11–10 on penalties to win the gold medal. In the bronze medal match, Jersey defeated the Isle of Wight 2–0.

== Background ==
A five-a-side youth football tournament was held at the inaugural games in 1985 held in Douglas, Isle of Man but football was completely absent from the programme at the 1987 Island Games held in Guernsey. The first men's football tournament was held at the 1989 Island Games in the Faroe Islands and had been ever present in the intervening years. The Faroe Islands and Jersey held the record for gold medals having won the men's football tournament twice although the Faroe Islands have not competed since their win at the 1991 Island Games in Åland. Ynys Môn were the defending champions after defeating the Isle of Man 1–0 in the gold medal match at the 1999 Island Games in Gotland.

== Format ==
A total of 12 teams took part in the competition. They were drawn into four single round robin groups of three teams. The winning team from each group would contest the semi-finals which would decide the teams contesting the gold and bronze medal matches. Play-off placement matches were held for the teams finishing second and third in each group – the runners-up would contest the fifth to eighth semi-finals and the third-placed teams contested the ninth to 12th semi-finals.

=== Participants ===
- Falkland Islands
- Gibraltar
- Greenland
- Guernsey
- Isle of Man
- Isle of Wight
- Jersey
- Orkney
- Rhodes
- Saare County
- Shetland
- Ynys Môn

== Group Phase ==
=== Group 1 ===
Ynys Môn won the group on goal difference to progress to the semi-finals.

Rank	Nation	Pld	W	D	L	GF	GA	Pts	GD
1	Ynys Môn	2	1	1	0	5	2	4	+3
2	Shetland	2	1	1	0	4	3	4	+1
3	Saare County	2	0	0	2	3	7	0	–4

8 July

Ynys Môn	4–1	Saare County
Tony Williams 5'; Richard Hughes 7', 36'; Kevin Roberts 10'		Hendrik Karlson 75'

Malew Road, Castletown

9 July

Saare County	2–3	Shetland
Maiko Molder 72', 77'		Grant Gilfillan 58'; Paul Spence 85'; John Simpson 90'

Croit Lowey, Port Erin

10 July

Ynys Môn	1–1	Shetland
Mark Williams 60'		Stuart Smith 49'

St. George's, Douglas

=== Group 2 ===
Jersey won both of their games to progress to the semi-finals.

Rank	Nation	Pld	W	D	L	GF	GA	Pts	GD
1	Jersey	2	2	0	0	14	1	6	+13
2	Gibraltar	2	1	0	1	3	2	3	+1
3	Orkney	2	0	0	2	0	14	0	–14

8 July

Jersey	12–0	Orkney
James Reilly 10', 67', 88'; Paul Duxbury 22'; Craig Ferey 38'; Steve Coutanche 43', 49'; Daniel Craven 55', 70', 74', 90', 90'

St. George's, Douglas

9 July

Orkney	0–2	Gibraltar
		Roy Chipolina 57', 80'

Tromode Park, Douglas

10 July

Jersey	2–1	Gibraltar
Robert Fox; Pat O'Toole		unknown

The Bowl, Douglas

=== Group 3 ===
The Isle of Wight won their group to progress to the semi-finals.

Rank	Nation	Pld	W	D	L	GF	GA	Pts	GD
1	Isle of Wight	2	1	1	0	4	1	4	+3
2	Rhodes	2	1	0	1	3	4	3	–1
3	Greenland	2	0	1	1	0	2	1	–2

8 July

Isle of Wight	0–0	Greenland

Douglas Road, Peel

9 July

Greenland	0–2	Rhodes

Ballacloan Stadium, Ramsey

10 July

Rhodes	1–4	Isle of Wight
		Liam Gearing 31', 81', 90'; Terry Pawling 70'

Tromode Park, Douglas

=== Group 4 ===
Guernsey won both of their games to progress to the semi-finals.

Rank	Nation	Pld	W	D	L	GF	GA	Pts	GD
1	Guernsey	2	2	0	0	15	2	6	+14
2	Isle of Man	2	1	0	1	11	4	3	+7
3	Falkland Islands	2	0	0	2	1	21	0	–20

8 July

Isle of Man	9–1	Falkland Islands
Chris Higgins 15', 43', 53', 56', 85'; Nick Hurt 44'; Peter Langridge 60'; Steve Corkill 70'; Nigel Corkill 73'		Hulocho 1'

The Bowl, Douglas

9 July

Guernsey	12–0	Falkland Islands
Grant Chalmers 29', 90', 90+1'; Hick Lippinno 33', 34' (pen.); Miliko Harrinito 47', 49', 52', 56', 59'; Own goal 75'

The Bowl, Douglas

10 July

Isle of Man	2–3	Guernsey
Steve Corkill 15'; Nigel Corkill 85'

Croit Lowey, Port Erin

== Placement play-off matches ==
=== Ninth to 12th semi-finals ===
Saare County defeated Orkney and Greenland defeated the Falkland Islands in the ninth to 12th semi-finals.

12 July

Saare County	2–1	Orkney
Maiko Molder		Douglas Omand

Tromode Park, Douglas

12 July

Greenland	4–0	Falkland Islands
Tom Nielsen; Anders Petersen

Garey Mooar, Braddan

=== Fifth to eighth semi-finals ===
Rhodes defeated the Isle of Man and Gibraltar defeated Shetland in the fifth to eighth semi-finals.

12 July

Isle of Man	1–3	Rhodes

Ballacloan Stadium, Ramsey

12 July

Gibraltar	2–0	Shetland
Graham Alvez; Roy Chipolina

Douglas Road, Peel

=== 11th-place match ===
The Falkland Islands defeated Orkney in the 11th-place match.

13 July

Orkney	1–4	Falkland Islands
		Colin Buckland 2'; Jeremy Henry; Stephen Aldridge

Douglas Road, Peel

=== Ninth-place match ===
Greenland defeated Saare County in the ninth-place match.

13 July

Greenland	2–0	Saare County
Knud Olsen Egede

Ballacloan Stadium, Ramsey

=== Seventh-place match ===
The Isle of Man defeated Shetland in the seventh-place match.

13 July

Isle of Man	2–2	Shetland
Tony Duggan 10'; Peter Langridge 67'		James Johnston 13'; Paul Spence 63'
Penalties
	5–4

Malew Road, Castletown

=== Fifth-place match ===
Gibraltar defeated Rhodes in the fifth-place match.

13 July

Gibraltar	2–0	Rhodes
Ramirez 2'

Groves Road, Douglas

== Semi-finals ==
Guernsey defeated the Isle of White and Ynys Môn defeated Jersey in the semi-finals.

12 July

Isle of Wight	2–3	Guernsey
Liam Gearing 1'; Martyn Raggett 39'		John Nobes 24'; Jan Renouf 69'; Gavin le Page 90'

Croit Lowey, Port Erin

12 July

Ynys Môn	2–2	Jersey
Danny Hughes; Mark Williams		Yazalde Santos; Craig Ferey
Penalties
	4–3

Malew Road, Castletown

== Bronze medal match ==
Jersey defeated the Isle of Wight in the bronze medal match.

13 July

Isle of Wight	0–2	Jersey

St. George's, Douglas

== Gold medal match ==
Guernsey defeated Ynys Môn in the gold medal match.

13 July

Guernsey	0–0	Ynys Môn
Penalties
	11–10

The Bowl, Douglas

== Final rankings ==
Rank	Team
Gold medal	Guernsey
Silver medal	Ynys Môn
Bronze medal	Jersey
4	Isle of Wight
5	Gibraltar
6	Rhodes
7	Isle of Man
8	Shetland
9	Greenland
10	Saare County
11	Falkland Islands
12	Orkney
