= Football at the 1997 Island Games =

Men's Football at the Island Games 1997
Tournament details
- Host country: Jersey
- Dates: 29 June – 4 July
- Teams: 9
- Venue: 6 (in 5 host cities)

Final positions
- Champions: Jersey (2nd title)
- Runners-up: Ynys Môn
- Third place: Isle of Wight
- Fourth place: Guernsey

Tournament statistics
- Matches played: 20
- Goals scored: 68 (3.4 per match)
- Top scorer(s): (Anglesey) Eifion Williams (6 goals)

Football was contested as part of the programme for the 1997 Island Games which was hosted in Jersey from 28 June to 4 July 1997. It was the fifth edition of the men's football tournament at the multi-sport event organised by the International Island Games Association.

The football tournament began with the first matches in the group stage on 29 June 1997 and ended with the gold medal match on 4 July 1997. Hosts Jersey and Ynys Môn contested the final. Lee Bramley scored the only goal of the match as Jersey won the gold medal and equalled the Faroe Islands record by winning the gold medal for a second time. In the bronze medal match, defending champions the Isle of Wight defeated Guernsey 3–1.

== Background ==
A five-a-side youth football tournament was held at the inaugural games in 1985 held in Douglas, Isle of Man but football was completely absent from the programme at the 1987 Island Games held in Guernsey. The first men's football tournament was held at the 1989 Island Games in the Faroe Islands. The Faroe Islands won the first two editions undefeated but have not competed since their win at the 1991 Island Games in Åland. No team had won the competition more than once since then. Jersey won gold at the 1993 Island Games held on the Isle of Wight and the Isle of Wight were the defending champions after defeating hosts Gibraltar 1–0 in the gold medal match at the 1995 Island Games.

== Format ==
Eight teams took part in the competition. They were drawn into two single round robin groups of four teams. The winning team from each group would contest the gold medal match and the runners-up would contest the bronze medal match. Play-off placement matches were held for the teams finishing third and fourth in each group – the third-placed teams contested the fifth-place match and the fourth-placed teams contested the seventh-place match.

=== Participants ===
- Frøya
- Gibraltar
- Greenland
- Guernsey
- Hitra Municipality
- Isle of Wight
- Jersey
- Shetland
- Ynys Môn

== Group phase ==
=== Group A ===
Jersey won all four of their games to progress to the gold medal match.

Pos	Team	Pld	W	D	L	GF	GA	GD	Pts	Qualification
1	Jersey	4	4	0	0	13	4	+9	12	Qualification for the Gold medal match
2	Guernsey	4	2	1	1	5	5	0	7	Qualification for the Bronze medal match
3	Gibraltar	4	2	0	2	12	6	+6	6	Qualification for the fifth-place match
4	Frøya	4	1	0	3	3	12	−9	3	Qualification for the seventh-place match
5	Greenland	4	0	1	3	3	9	−6	1	

29 June

Frøya	1–4	Jersey
Karl Måsøval		Adam Greig (2); Nelio de Freitas; Craig Morton

FB Fields, St. Clement

29 June

Gibraltar	1–2	Guernsey
Daisen Macedo		Adrian Exall; Paul Nobes

La Boulivot, Grouville

30 June

Greenland	1–2	Jersey
Jan Nielsen		Adam Greig; Steve Coutanche

La Hague Manor, St. Peter

30 June

Frøya	0–3	Guernsey
		Jan Renouf; Tony Vance; Paul Nobes

St. Peter

1 July

Guernsey	0–0	Greenland

Springfield, St. Helier

1 July

Frøya	0–4	Gibraltar
		Keith Lagusa; Dennis Lopez (2); Aaron Lima

La Couvent, St. Lawrence

2 July

Gibraltar	5–1	Greenland
Nathan Bagu; Dennis Lopez; Aaron Lima (2)		Charles Rasmussen

La Couvent, St. Lawrence

2 July

Guernsey	0–4	Jersey
		Adam Greig; Nelio de Freitas; Lee Bramley; Yazalde Santos

Springfield, St. Helier
Attendance: 5,000

3 July

Frøya	2–1	Greenland
Karl Måsøval (2)		Jan Nielsen

La Boulivot, Grouville

3 July

Gibraltar	2–3	Jersey
Keith Laguse; Dennis Lopez		Adam Greig; Damon Pih; Craig Morton

Springfield, St. Helier

=== Group B ===
Ynys Môn won the group to progress to the gold medal match.

Pos	Team	Pld	W	D	L	GF	GA	GD	Pts	Qualification
1	Ynys Môn	3	2	1	0	12	0	+12	7	Qualification for the Gold medal match
2	Isle of Wight	3	1	2	0	4	0	+4	5	Qualification for the Bronze medal match
3	Shetland	3	1	1	1	2	5	−3	4	Qualification for the fifth-place match
4	Hitra Municipality	3	0	0	3	1	14	−13	0	Qualification for the seventh-place match

29 June

Ynys Môn	8–0	Hitra Municipality
Campbell Harrison; Andrew Wagstaff (2); Andrew Stewart; Eifion Williams (4)

La Hague Manor, St. Peter

29 June

Shetland	0–0	Isle of Wight

St. Peter

1 July

Ynys Môn	4–0	Shetland
David Evans; Eifion Williams (2); Gerallt Jones

FB Fields, St. Clement

1 July

Hitra Municipality	0–4	Isle of Wight
		Darren Plenty; Adam Robinson; Martyn Raggett (2)

La Boulivot, Grouville

3 July

Ynys Môn	0–0	Isle of Wight

St. Peter

3 July

Shetland	2–1	Hitra Municipality
Michael Williamson (2)		Marius Fløkvik

La Couvent, St. Lawrence

== Placement play-off matches ==
=== Seventh-place match ===
Frøya defeated Hitra Municipality in the seventh-place match.

4 July

Frøya	4–1	Hitra Municipality
Tore Furberg; Trond Bekken; Karl Måsevöl; Arve Iversen		Bror Blichfeldt

La Boulivot, Grouville

=== Fifth-place match ===
Shetland defeated Gibraltar in the fifth-place match.

4 July

Shetland	2–1	Gibraltar
Robert Adamson; George Watt		Joao da Silva

La Couvent, St. Lawrence

== Bronze medal match ==
The Isle of Wight defeated Guernsey in the bronze medal match.

4 July

Isle of Wight	3–1	Guernsey
Adam Bardsell; Simon Butler; Adam Robinson		Stephen Brehault

St. Peter

== Gold medal match ==
Jersey defeated Ynys Môn in the bronze medal match.

4 July
12:30

Jersey	1–0	Ynys Môn
Lee Bramley

Springfield, St. Helier

== Final rankings ==
Rank	Team
Gold medal	Jersey
Silver medal	Ynys Môn
Bronze medal	Isle of Wight
4	Guernsey
5	Shetland
6	Gibraltar
7	Frøya
8	Hitra Municipality
9	Greenland

== Top goalscorers ==
6 goals

- (Anglesey) Eifion Williams

5 goals

- (Jersey) Adam Greig
- (Gibraltar) Dennis Lopez

4 goals

- (Gibraltar) Aaron Lima

3 goals

- (Frøya Municipality) Karl Måsøval
