= Football at the 2003 Island Games – Men's tournament =

Men's Football at the Island Games 2003
Tournament details
- Host country: Guernsey
- Dates: 29 June – 4 July
- Teams: 15
- Venues: 6 (in 4 host cities)

Final positions
- Champions: Guernsey (2nd title)
- Runners-up: Isle of Man
- Third place: Jersey
- Fourth place: Isle of Wight

Tournament statistics
- Matches played: 33
- Goals scored: 175 (5.3 per match)

The 2003 Island Games on the island of Guernsey was the 8th edition in which a men's football tournament was played at the multi-games competition. It was contested by 15 teams.

Guernsey won the tournament for the second time.

== Participants ==
- Alderney
- Frøya
- Gibraltar
- Gotland
- Greenland
- Guernsey
- Isle of Man
- Isle of Wight
- Jersey
- Orkney
- Rhodes
- Saare County
- Sark
- Shetland
- Ynys Môn

== Group phase ==
=== Group A ===
Rank	Nation	Pld	W	D	L	GF	GA	Pts	GD
1	Isle of Man	2	2	0	0	6	1	6	+5
2	Ynys Môn	2	1	0	1	3	2	3	+1
3	Saare County	2	0	0	2	0	6	0	–6

29 June

Saare County	0–2	Ynys Môn
		Gerallt Jones (?)

Cycling Ground, St. Sampson

30 June

Isle of Man	4–0	Saare County
Alan Cowley (?); Peter Langridge (?); Jonny Cowley (?); Martin Reilly (?)

Cycling Ground, St. Sampson

1 July

Ynys Môn	1–2	Isle of Man
Richard Hughes (?)		Alan Cowley (?); Chris Bass (?)

Cycling Ground, St. Sampson

=== Group B ===
Rank	Nation	Pld	W	D	L	GF	GA	Pts	GD
1	Jersey	3	2	1	0	10	1	7	+9
2	Shetland	3	1	1	1	3	6	4	–3
3	Gotland	3	0	3	0	2	2	3	0
4	Frøya	3	0	1	2	4	10	1	–6

29 June

Frøya	1–5	Jersey
unknown (?)		Ross Crick (?); Dave Le Roux (?); Chris Vowden (?)

North Field, St. Sampson

29 June

Shetland	0–0	Gotland

North Field, St. Sampson

30 June

Gotland	2–2	Frøya

North Field, St. Sampson

30 June

Jersey	5–0	Shetland
Ross Crick (?); Chris Andrews (?); Neil Cabot (?)

North Field, St. Sampson

1 July

Shetland	3–1	Frøya
Steven Umphray (?); Alan Duncan (?)		unknown (?)

North Field, St. Sampson

1 July

Jersey	0–0	Gotland

North Field, St. Sampson

=== Group C ===
Rank	Nation	Pld	W	D	L	GF	GA	Pts	GD
1	Guernsey	2	2	0	0	19	1	6	+18
2	Orkney	2	1	0	1	3	13	3	–10
3	Alderney	2	0	0	2	2	10	0	–8

29 June

Guernsey	7–1	Alderney
Tony Vance (?); Ryan Tippett (?); Chris Chamberlain (?); Paul Nobes (?); Matt Le Cras (?)		unknown (?)

Corbet Field, St. Sampson

30 June

Guernsey	12–0	Orkney
Danny Bisson 1', 5', 9', 85', 89'; Neil Clegg 10', 13', 19'; Matt Le Cras 26'; Own goal 55'; Paul Nobes 67'; Jonathan Eley 77'

Corbet Field, St. Sampson

1 July

Orkney	3–1	Alderney
Andrew Groundwater (?); Mark O'Brien (?); Kevin Groundwater (?)		unknown (?)

Corbet Field, St. Sampson
- Rhodes originally entered into Group 3 but withdrew from the tournament following their final game against Guernsey, which was abandoned at 70 minutes (with Guernsey leading 2–1 – Goals: Ryan Tippett 2) after they had five players sent off. Rhodes' previous two games (6–1 vs. Orkney and 5–1 vs. Alderney) were expunged from the records.

=== Group D ===
Rank	Nation	Pld	W	D	L	GF	GA	Pts	GD
1	Isle of Wight	3	2	0	1	23	3	6	+20
2	Gibraltar	3	2	0	1	22	2	6	+20
3	Greenland	3	2	0	1	18	3	6	+15
4	Sark	3	0	0	3	0	55	0	–55

29 June

Gibraltar	19–0	Sark
Graham Alvez 5', 7', 13', 28', 39'; Lee Casciaro 16', 35'; Roy Chipolina 25', 33', 40', 45', 77', 89'; Daniel Duarte 37'; Lee Ferrary 43', 60'; Jesse Britto 68', 70'; Colin Ramirez 85'

Blanche Pierre Lane, St. Martin

29 June

Isle of Wight	1–2	Greenland
Aaron Cook 58'		Leifeeraq Karlsen 25'; Mark Fletcher 55' (o.g.)

Blanche Pierre Lane, St. Martin

30 June

Sark	0–20	Isle of Wight
		Adam Sunsburg 7', 57'; Phil McDonald 6', 9', 10'; Mick Sherry 12', 16', 63'; Jermaine Moyce 24'; Aaron Cook 30', 35', 39', 69'; Chris Bridges 56', 78', 79'; Ollie Buckett 85'; Ollie Fleming 87'; Martin Raggett 90+7'; Andrew Watson 90+9'

Blanche Pierre Lane, St. Martin

30 June

Gibraltar	2–0	Greenland
Al Greene (?); Dylan Moreno (?)

Blanche Pierre Lane, St. Martin

1 July

Isle of Wight	2–1	Gibraltar
Darren Powell 42'; Mick Sherry 61'		Colin Ramirez 79'

Blanche Pierre Lane, St. Martin

1 July

Greenland	16–0	Sark
Anders Petersen 6', 20', 38'; Vitus Kofoed 9', 15', 25', 37', 44', 50'; Joel Hansen 28'; Peri Fleischer 33'; Anda Aminaq 60'; Leifeeraq Karlsen 62'; Jens Madsen 66'; Wayne Dolan 68' (o.g.); Niklas Kreutzmann 74'

Blanche Pierre Lane, St. Martin

== Placement play-off matches ==
=== 13th place match ===
3 July

Frøya	15–0	Sark

Arsenal Ground, Mount Hale, Alderney

=== 9th – 12th place semi-finals ===
3 July

Alderney	0–3	Greenland
		John Eldevig 31'; Niklas Kreutzmann 84'; Peter Svane 90'

Corbet Field, St. Sampson

3 July

Gotland	3–0	Saare County

Cycling Ground, St. Sampson

=== 5th – 8th place semi-finals ===
3 July

Ynys Môn	2–1	Shetland
Gerallt Jones (?) own goal (?)		Paul Spence (?)

North Field, St. Sampson

3 July

Orkney	1–7	Gibraltar
Andrew Corsie 60'		Graham Alvez 8', 66', 84'; Roy Chipolina 50', 72', 85'; Colin Ramirez 76'

North Field, St. Sampson

=== 11th place match ===
4 July

Saare County	0–1	Alderney

Blanche Pierre Lane, St. Martin

=== 9th place match ===
4 July

Gotland	2–1 (a.e.t.)	Greenland
Magnus Aronsson 3'; Johan Hultman 102'		Vitus Kofoed 38'

Corbet Field, St. Sampson

=== 7th place match ===
4 July

Orkney	0–6	Shetland
		Moray Leask (?); Paul Spence (?); Johnny Montgomery (?); Steven Umphray (?)

North Field, St. Sampson

=== 5th place match ===
4 July

Gibraltar	0–2	Ynys Môn
		Gerallt Jones 9'; Boateng 32' (o.g.)

Corbet Field, St. Sampson

== Final stage ==
=== Semi-finals ===
3 July

Isle of Man	2–1	Jersey
Peter Langridge (?); Chris Bass (?)		Paul Duxbury (?)

Corbet Field, St. Sampson

3 July

Guernsey	3–1	Isle of Wight
Chris Chamberlain (?); Matt Warren (?); Neil Clegg (?)		Phil McDonald (?)

Corbet Field, St. Sampson

=== 3rd Place Match ===
4 July

Jersey	3–0	Isle of Wight

Blanche Pierre Lane, St. Martin

=== Final ===
4 July

Guernsey	3–1	Isle of Man
Matt Warren (?)		Peter Langridge (?)

Footes Lane, St. Peter Port
Attendance: 6,000

2003 Island Games Winners
Guernsey
Second Title

== Final rankings ==
Rank	Team
Gold medal	Guernsey
Silver medal	Isle of Man
Bronze medal	Jersey
4	Isle of Wight
5	Ynys Môn
6	Gibraltar
7	Shetland
8	Orkney
9	Gotland
10	Greenland
11	Alderney
12	Saare County
13	Frøya
14	Sark
DNF	Rhodes
