= Football at the 2011 Island Games – Men's tournament =

Men's Football at the Island Games 2011
Tournament details
- Host country: Isle of Wight
- Dates: 26 June – 1 July
- Teams: 15
- Venue: 9 (in 8 host cities)

Final positions
- Champions: Isle of Wight (2nd title)
- Runners-up: Guernsey
- Third place: Jersey
- Fourth place: Åland

Tournament statistics
- Matches played: 29
- Goals scored: 126 (4.34 per match)
- Top scorer(s): (Åland) Peter Lundberg (5 goals)

The 2011 Island Games on the Isle of Wight was the 12th edition in which a football tournament was played at the multi-games competition. It was contested by 15 teams.

There were numerous talking points in the early stages of the competition. The Rhodes team was disqualified after the second game for repeated indiscipline, and were suspended from the next two Island Games. In Group D, there was a unique occurrence as both the Åland Islands and Saaremaa finished with identical playing records after their two games. Rather than draw lots as had been originally planned for such circumstances, the two teams played a one-off penalty shoot-out on the designated rest day to determine which side would finish top of the group, with Åland proceeding to the semi-finals.

The host country, the Isle of Wight, defeated Guernsey after extra-time in the final to win their 2nd title, following a win over reigning champions Jersey in the semi-final.

== Participants ==
- Åland
- Alderney
- Falkland Islands
- Gibraltar
- Gotland
- Greenland
- Guernsey
- Isle of Man
- Isle of Wight
- Jersey
- Menorca
- Rhodes
- Saare County
- Western Isles
- Ynys Môn

== Group phase ==
=== Group A ===
Rank	Nation	Pld	W	D	L	GF	GA	GD	Pts
1	Jersey	3	3	0	0	6	1	+5	9
2	Menorca	3	2	0	1	6	4	+2	6
3	Rhodes	3	1	0	2	2	6	−4	3
4	Greenland	3	0	0	3	4	7	−3	0

- Rhodes were disqualified from the competition after two games due to their disciplinary record, which saw five players sent off with nine other players receiving yellow cards in their two games. Menorca were awarded a 3 – 0 victory for the game that would have taken place between the two teams.
26 June
15:00

Rhodes	2–1	Greenland
Panagiotis Mathios 30'; Panagiotis Pompou 55'	Report	Pavia Mølgaard 86'

Vicarage Lane, Brading
Attendance: 204
Referee: Gary Sutton

26 June
19:00

Jersey	2–0	Menorca
Joe Murphy 70'; Lucas Parker 88'	Report

Westwood Park, Cowes
Attendance: 178
Referee: James Linnington

27 June
19:00

Greenland	2–3	Menorca
Pavia Mølgaard 38'; John-Ludvig Broberg 65'	Report	Ignasi Dalmedo 6'; David Mas 51', 90'

Beatrice Avenue, East Cowes
Referee: Gavin Ward

27 June
19:30

Jersey	2–0	Rhodes
Ben Gallichan 71'; Mark Lucas 90'	Report

St Georges Park, Newport
Referee: Keith Stroud

28 June
19:00

Greenland	1–2	Jersey
Norsaq Lund Mathæussen 87'	Report	Craig Leitch 9' (pen.); Craig Russell 58'

Camp Road, Freshwater
Referee: Chris Powell

Menorca	Cancelled (3–0)	Rhodes

=== Group B ===
Rank	Nation	Pld	W	D	L	GF	GA	GD	Pts
1	Isle of Wight	3	3	0	0	11	2	+9	9
2	Gibraltar	3	2	0	1	14	7	+7	6
3	Ynys Môn	3	1	0	2	8	10	−2	3
4	Alderney	3	0	0	3	1	15	−14	0

26 June
14:00

Alderney	1–6	Gibraltar
Joshua McCulloch 64'	Report	Joseph Chipolina 12'; Roy Chipolina 27', 29'; Lee Casciaro 38', 50'; Daniel Duarte 89'

St Georges Park, Newport
Referee: Justin Amey

26 June
19:30

Isle of Wight	4–0	Ynys Môn
Ian Seabrook 13'; Charlie Smeeton 48'; Kyle Levrier 55'; Scott Jones 65'	Report

St Georges Park, Newport
Referee: Keith Stroud

27 June
19:00

Alderney	0–4	Isle of Wight
	Report	Ryan Woodford 8'; Oliver Fleming 23'; Charlie Smeeton 27'; Tom Scovell 84'

Westwood Park, Cowes
Attendance: 583
Referee: Gary Sutton

27 June
19:00

Gibraltar	6–3	Ynys Môn
Aaron Payas 7'; Lee Casciaro 12', 90'; Liam Walker 51', 56', 83'	Report	Iwan Williams 62'; Asa Thomas 66'; Richard Hughes 89'

Vicarage Lane, Brading

28 June
18:30

Alderney	0–5	Ynys Môn
	Report	Edward Rhys Roberts 32'; Richard Hughes 43'; Darren Gowans 48'; Alex Jones 63'; Asa Thomas 79'

Green Lane, Shanklin
Referee: James Linnington

28 June
19:00

Gibraltar	2–3	Isle of Wight
Yogan Santos 57'; Joseph Chipolina 84'	Report	Iain Seabrook 10', 49'; Scott Jones 28'

Beatrice Avenue, East Cowes
Referee: Gavin Ward

=== Group C ===
Rank	Nation	Pld	W	D	L	GF	GA	GD	Pts
1	Guernsey	3	3	0	0	12	3	+9	9
2	Isle of Man	3	2	0	1	11	4	+7	6
3	Gotland	3	1	0	2	10	10	0	3
4	Falkland Islands	3	0	0	3	1	17	−16	0

26 June
14:00

Gotland	2–4	Isle of Man
	Report	Ciaran McNulty; Nick Hurt; Conor Doyle

Westwood Park, Cowes
Referee: Gavin Ward

26 June
19:00

Guernsey	5–0	Falkland Islands
	Report

Vicarage Lane, Brading
Attendance: 179
Referee: Chris Powell

27 June
18:30

Isle of Man	6–0	Falkland Islands
Daniel Bell 9'; Sean Quaye 20'; Lee Gale 24', 41'; Calum Morrisey 44'; Cairan McNulty 85'	Report

Highwood Lane, Rookley
Referee: Justin Amey

27 June
19:00

Gotland	2–5	Guernsey
Tom Eneqvist 10'; Joakim Persson 90'	Report	Simon Tostevin 5', 24', 80'; Kieran Mahon 65'; Glen Dyer 88'

Camp Road, Freshwater
Referee: James Linnington

28 June
14:00

Guernsey	2–1	Isle of Man
Dominic Heaume 11'; Glen Dyer 27'	Report	Conor Doyle 79'

Beatrice Avenue, East Cowes
Referee: Keith Stroud

28 June
14:30

Falkland Islands	1–6	Gotland
Sotomayor 69'	Report	Gustav Söderberg 28'; Daniel Biggs 40' (o.g.), 52' (o.g.); Peter Öhman 41'; Jonathan Bogren 47'; Kenneth Budin 59'

Salters Road, Oakfield
Referee: Gary Sutton

=== Group D ===
Rank	Nation	Pld	W	D	L	GF	GA	GD	Pts
1	Åland	2	1	1	0	5	3	+2	4
2	Saare County	2	1	1	0	5	3	+2	4
3	Western Isles	2	0	0	2	0	4	−4	0

- As both Åland Islands and Saaremaa finished with identical playing records, a penalty shoot out was held to decide the winner of Group D
26 June
19:00

Åland	3–3	Saare County
Peter Lundberg 39'; Alexander Weckström 45', 71'	Report	Martti Pukk 2'; Elari Valmas 6'; Sander Laht 73'

Beatrice Avenue, East Cowes
Referee: Brendan Malone

27 June
14:00

Western Isles	0–2	Åland
	Report	Peter Lundberg 57', 71'

St Georges Park, Newport
Attendance: 158
Referee: William Bull

28 June
11:30

Saare County	2–0	Western Isles
Thorwald-Eirik Kaljo 47'; Elari Valmas 85'	Report

Community Club, Cowes
Referee: Justin Amey

==== Penalty-shoot out play-off for 1st place ====
29 June
14:00

Saare County	3–4 (p.s.o.)	Åland
	Report

Highwood Lane, Rookley

== Placement play-off matches ==
=== 13th place match ===
30 June
18:30

Alderney	0–3	Falkland Islands
	Report	Claudio Ross 40'; Wayne Clement 55'; Josh Peck 77'

Green Lane, Shanklin
Referee: Justin Amey

=== 11th place match ===
30 June
14:00

Greenland	1–0	Western Isles
Anders H. Petersen 88'	Report

Green Lane, Shanklin
Referee: Daniel Cook

=== 9th place match ===
30 June
19:00

Gotland	1–2	Ynys Môn
Andreas Kraft 75'	Report	Asa Thomas 28', 33'

Camp Road, Freshwater
Referee: Gary Parsons

=== 7th place match ===
30 June
11:30

Isle of Man	2–2	Menorca
Conor Doyle 62'; Adam Creegan 90'	Report	David Mas 9', 36'
Penalties
	1–3

Community Club, Cowes
Referee: William Bull

=== 5th place match ===
30 June
19:00

Saare County	0–4	Gibraltar
	Report	Roy Chipolina 4'; Joseph Chipolina 11'; Liam Walker 45'; Jeremy Lopez 61'

Vicarage Lane, Brading
Referee: James Linnington

== Final stage ==
=== Bracket ===
Semi-finals
30 June – (Cowes)
Jersey	0
Isle of Wight	1
30 June – (Brading)
Guernsey	3
Åland	2

Final
1 July – (Newport)
Isle of Wight	4
Guernsey	2
Third place
1 July – (Brading)
Jersey	5
Åland	1

=== Semifinals ===
30 June
14:30

Jersey	0–1	Isle of Wight
	Report	John McKie 73'

Westwood Park, Cowes
Attendance: 815
Referee: Brendan Malone

30 June
15:00

Guernsey	3–2	Åland
Dominic Heaume 20'; Glyn Dyer 47'; Ross Allen 82'	Report	Peter Lundberg 16', 62'

Vicarage Lane, Brading
Referee: Lee Probert

=== Third place match ===
1 July
10:30

Jersey	5–1	Åland
Luke Watson 40'; Lee Bradshaw 41'; Luke Watson 45'; Jay Reid 55'; Craig Leitch 87'	Report	Samuel Fagerholm 45'

Vicarage Lane, Brading
Referee: Gary Sutton

=== Final ===
1 July
15:00

Isle of Wight	4–2	Guernsey
Charlie Smeeton 62', 101'; Ryan Woodford 64'; Iain Seabrook 116'	(a.e.t.); Report	Ross Allen 5'; Matthew Loaring 86'

St Georges Park, Newport
Attendance: 1,870
Referee: Keith Stroud

2011 Island Games Winners
Isle of Wight
Second Title

== Final rankings ==
Rank	Team
Gold medal	Isle of Wight
Silver medal	Guernsey
Bronze medal	Jersey
4	Åland
5	Gibraltar
6	Saare County
7	Menorca
8	Isle of Man
9	Ynys Môn
10	Gotland
11	Greenland
12	Western Isles
13	Falkland Islands
14	Alderney
DSQ	Rhodes

== See also ==
- Women's Football at the 2011 Island Games
