= Football at the 2005 Island Games – Men's tournament =

Men's Football at the Island Games 2005
Tournament details
- Host country: Shetland
- Dates: 10–15 July
- Teams: 10
- Venue: 10

Final positions
- Champions: Shetland (1st title)
- Runners-up: Guernsey
- Third place: Western Isles
- Fourth place: Isle of Man

Tournament statistics
- Matches played: 25
- Goals scored: 87 (3.48 per match)
- Top scorer(s): (Isle of Man) Peter Langridge (Isle of Man) Johnny Myers (Saare County) Martti Pukk (4 goals)

Football was contested as part of the programme for the 2005 Island Games which was hosted in Shetland from 9 to 15 July 2005. It was the ninth edition of the men's football tournament at the multi-sport event organised by the International Island Games Association.

The football tournament began with the first matches in the group stage on 10 July 2005 and ended with the gold medal match on 15 July 2005. Hosts Shetland and Guernsey, the two-time defending champions, contested the final. Goals from John Montgomery and Duncan Bray helped Shetland defeat Guernsey 2–0 to win the gold medal. In the bronze medal match, the Western Isles defeated the Isle of Man 4–0.

== Background ==
Football had been part of the Island Games programme following the debut of a senior men's competition at the 1989 Island Games in the Faroe Islands. Previously, a five-a-side youth football tournament was held at the inaugural games in 1985 held in Douglas, Isle of Man but football was completely absent from the programme at the 1987 Island Games held in Guernsey.

The Faroe Islands, Jersey and Guernsey held the record for gold medals having won the men's football tournament twice although the Faroe Islands have not competed since their win at the 1991 Island Games in Åland. Guernsey were two-time defending champions after defeating Ynys Môn on penalties in the gold medal match at the 2001 Island Games held on the Isle of Man and then the Isle of Man 3–1 in the gold medal match as hosts at the 2003 Island Games.

== Format ==
A total of 10 teams took part in the competition. They were drawn into two single round robin groups of five teams. The winning team from each group would contest the gold medal match and the runners-up would contest the bronze medal match. Play-off placement matches were held for the teams finishing third, fourth and fifth in each group – the third-placed teams contested the fifth-place match, the fourth-placed teams contested the seventh-place match and the fifth-placed teams contested the ninth-place match.

=== Participants ===
- Åland U21
- Falkland Islands
- Greenland
- Guernsey
- Isle of Man
- Orkney
- Saare County
- Shetland
- Western Isles
- Ynys Môn

== Group phase ==
=== Group 1 ===
Shetland won the group to progress to the gold medal match.

Rank	Nation	Pld	W	D	L	GF	GA	Pts	GD
1	Shetland	4	3	1	0	8	1	10	+7
2	Isle of Man	4	2	1	1	12	3	7	+9
3	Saare County	4	1	2	1	5	5	5	0
4	Åland U21	4	1	0	3	4	7	3	–3
5	Falkland Islands	4	1	0	3	3	16	3	–13

10 July

Saare County	2–1	Åland U21
Andrus Koplimae 58'; Martti Pukk 73'		Jonas Blomqvist 84'

Strom

10 July

Shetland	4–0	Falkland Islands
Duncan Bray 1'; John Montgomery 36'; Stuart Hay 51'; Leighton Flaws 84'

Gilbertson Park, Lerwick

11 July

Åland U21	1–3	Shetland
Linus Blomster 21'		Ross Jamieson 22'; John Montgomery 33'; James Johnston 60'

Seafield

11 July

Isle of Man	2–2	Saare County
Johnny Myers 2'; Gavin Faragher 89'		Dmitri Kulikov 38'; Martti Pukk 60'

Harbison Park, Whalsay

12 July

Saare County	1–2	Falkland Islands
Dmitri Kulikov 49'		Martyn Gilson-Clarke 3'; Wayne Clement 80'

Strom

12 July

Åland U21	0–1	Isle of Man
		Johnny Myers 27'

Sandwick

13 July

Shetland	0–0	Saare County

Seafield

13 July

Falkland Islands	0–9	Isle of Man
		Sean Quaye 7', 90'; Marc Kelly 8'; Peter Langridge 10', 17', 49', 57'; Johnny Myers 13', 43'

Boddam

14 July

Isle of Man	0–1	Shetland
		Stephen Umphray 79'

Gilbertson Park, Lerwick

14 July

Åland U21	2–1	Falkland Islands
Peter Isaksson 26'; Linus Blomster 85'		Martin Gilson-Clarke 58'

Sandwick

=== Group 2 ===
Guernsey won all four of their games to progress to the gold medal match.

Rank	Nation	Pld	W	D	L	GF	GA	Pts	GD
1	Guernsey	4	4	0	0	14	1	12	+13
2	Western Isles	4	1	2	1	10	10	5	0
3	Ynys Môn	4	1	2	1	2	3	5	–1
4	Greenland	4	1	2	1	6	11	5	–5
5	Orkney	4	0	0	4	5	12	0	–7

10 July

Guernsey	3–0	Orkney
Dominic Heaume 27'; Neil Clegg 40'; Joby Bourgaize 88'

Public Hall, Cunningsburgh

10 July

Greenland	0–0	Ynys Môn

Harbison Park, Whalsay

11 July

Orkney	1–2	Greenland
Steven Poke 76'		Brian Thomsen 10'; Peri Fleischer 84'

Unst

11 July

Guernsey	2–1	Western Isles
Ryan-Zico Black 45', 49'		Gordon Morrison 8'

Public Hall, Cunningsburgh

12 July

Orkney	0–2	Ynys Môn
		Robin Hodgkinson 4'; Gareth Parry 90'

Harbison Park, Whalsay

12 July

Western Isles	4–4	Greenland
Alasdair Mackay 57'; Gordon Morrison 66', 88'; Murdo Maclennan 89'		Salomon Thomassen 2', 37', 66'; Leifeeraq Karlsen 50'

Burra

13 July

Ynys Môn	0–0	Western Isles

Fraser Park, Scalloway

13 July

Greenland	0–6	Guernsey
		Dave Rihoy 9'; Neil Clegg 11'; John Nobes 45'; Dominic Heaume 58'; Joby Bourgaize 73'; Daragh Duffy 80'

Burra

14 July

Guernsey	3–0	Ynys Môn
Jonathan Veron 6', 35'; Steven Concanen 36'

Seafield

14 July

Western Isles	5–4	Orkney
Scott MacIver 3', 13'; Calum Mackay 34'; Paul Murray 62', 82'		Colin Flett 19'; Erik Bews 25'; Ross Sutherland 30'; Colin Risbridger 77'

Boddam

== Placement play-off matches ==
=== Ninth-place match ===
Orkney defeated the Falkland Islands in the ninth-place match.

15 July

Orkney	2–0	Falkland Islands
Steven Poke 5'; Ross Sutherland 20'

Sandwick

=== Seventh-place match ===
Åland U21 defeated Greenland in the seventh-place match.

15 July

Åland U21	3–2	Greenland
Fredrik Rautiainen 26'; Jonas Blonqvist 30'; Dan Lindblom 70'		Brian Thomsen 12'; Leifeeraeq Karlsen 72'

Fraser Park, Scalloway

=== Fifth-place match ===
Ynys Môn defeated Saare County in the fifth-place match.

15 July

Ynys Môn	3–2	Saare County
Darren Pritchard 33'; Patrick Roberts 53', 61'		Martti Pukk 54', 64'

Strom

== Bronze medal match ==
The Western Isles defeated the Isle of Man in the bronze medal match.

15 July

Western Isles	4–0	Isle of Man
Scott MacIver 29'; Andrew Dunn 39'; Paul Murray 65'; Donald MacPhail 76'

Seafield

== Gold medal match ==
Shetland defeated Guernsey in the gold medal match.

15 July

Guernsey	0–2	Shetland
		John Montgomery 62'; Duncan Bray 65'

Gilbertson Park, Lerwick
Attendance: 5,000

== Final rankings ==
Rank	Team
Gold medal	Shetland
Silver medal	Guernsey
Bronze medal	Western Isles
4	Isle of Man
5	Ynys Môn
6	Saare County
7	Åland U21
8	Greenland
9	Orkney
10	Falkland Islands

== Top goalscorers ==
4 goals

- (Isle of Man) Peter Langridge
- (Isle of Man) Johnny Myers
- (Saare County) Martti Pukk

3 goals

- (Outer Hebrides) Scott MacIver
- (Shetland) John Montgomery
- (Outer Hebrides) Gordon Morrison
- (Outer Hebrides) Paul Murray
- (Greenland) Salomon Thomassen
- (Isle of Man) Calum Morrissey
- (Shetland) Leighton Flaws
- (Shetland) Erik Thomson
