= Sark football team =

Men's association football team

Sark
2003
- Association: Sark FC
First colours

First international
- Gibraltar 19–0 Sark (Saint Martin, Guernsey; 29 June 2003)

Last international
- Frøya 15–0 Sark (Saint Anne, Alderney; 3 July 2003)

Biggest win
- None

Biggest defeat
- Sark 0–20 Isle of Wight (Saint Martin, Guernsey; 30 June 2003)

Island Games
- Appearances: 1 (first in 2003)
- Best result: Fourteenth place (2003)

The Sark football team represented the Channel Island of Sark in football.

The official team for the island of Sark, Sark FC, was created at the beginning of 2001.

Football was first played on Sark in the 1950s, with islanders typically playing friendlies against visiting ships' crew members and seasonal staff coming to work in the summer. It was not until 2001 that an official football team, Sark FC, was created. Having joined the Guernsey FA, Sark FC played in the GFA Cup for three years and regularly played against social club teams from Guernsey.

However, Sark's footballing community wanted more competitive matches and entered a football team for the 2003 Island Games. With a population of just 600, Sark were seen as outsiders against the likes of Greenland, which boasts 55,000 inhabitants, and Guernsey with a population of 65,000. Sark's first match in the tournament resulted in a 19–0 loss to Gibraltar.

For the three matches that followed, Sark were badly affected by injuries, on top of their inexperience and the lack of fitness in a squad that included some players aged in their 50s. Following the defeat against Gibraltar, Sark lost 20–0 to the Isle of Wight, 16–0 to Greenland, and 15–0 to Frøya, a small Norwegian island of 4,000 people. In all, Sark conceded 70 goals and scored none.

Sark has not competed in the Island Games football tournament since the 2003 tournament and is no longer part of the Guernsey Football Association.

Sark FC got disbanded in 2018.

Sark Island Hotels, the team’s sponsor

== International matches ==
Sark competed in the 2003 Island Games, in which the team lost all four matches by at least 15 goals, with a record of no goals scored and 70 conceded. This made Sark the first team to fail to score a single goal in an Island Games tournament.

All matches played at the 2003 Island Games; Sark’s score is listed first

Date	Round	Opponents	Score
29 June 2003	Group stage	Gibraltar	0–19
30 June 2003	Group stage	Isle of Wight	0–20
1 July 2003	Group stage	Greenland	0–16
3 July 2003	13th-place match	Frøya	0–15

== Coaching history ==
- (Sark) Chris Drillot (2001–2002)
- (Sark) Shane Moon (2002–2003)
- (Sark) Simon Elmont (2003–2007)
- (Sark) Matt Joyner (2007–2011)
- (Sark) Neil Williams (2011–2013)
- (Sark) Gary Hamon (2013–2015)
- (Sark) Neil Williams (2015–2018)
