= Shetland football team =

Men's football team representing Shetland, Scotland

Shetland
- Nickname(s): The Shelties, The Blues
- Association: Shetland Football Association
- Head coach: Neil Fenwick
- Captain: Erik Peterson
- Home stadium: Gilbertson Park, Lerwick, Shetland
First colours	Second colours

First international
- Orkney 2–3 Shetland (Kirkwall, Orkney; 7 May 1919)

Biggest win
- Orkney 0–8 Shetland (Kirkwall, Orkney; 30 July 2022)

Biggest defeat
- Orkney 7–1 Shetland (Kirkwall, Orkney; 30 June 1972)

The Shetland football team represents the islands of Shetland, Scotland, in association football. It is not a member of FIFA or UEFA and is therefore not eligible to enter the World Cup or the European Championships. The team regularly competes in the Island Games, which it won in 2005, and has a strong rivalry with the representative team of Orkney. This representative team should not be confused with Shetland FC, which was formed as a separate entity to compete during the mainland's winter season cup competitions - despite being separate entities, the teams share management staff and squad of players.

== Venues ==
Shetland normally play their home matches at Gilbertson Park (capacity unknown, highest attendance approximately 5,000, sometimes referred to as "the Gibbie") in Lerwick. Some matches, particularly friendlies, are occasionally played elsewhere, often at Seafield (Lerwick) or Harbison Park (Whalsay). They sometimes go on tour to play pre-season friendlies against Highland League clubs in July.

== Competitions ==
Beginning in 1929, Shetland played biennial matches against the Faroe Islands. These were initially played for the Adam Shield (donated by a Glasgow shipbuilding firm) and later for the North Atlantic Cup. The logistics of this required a 14-hour trip by boat and a week-long stay for the visiting team. The last such friendly was played in 1990, the same year that the Faroes joined UEFA.

Shetland are neither a national team nor do they participate in league competitions, so they do not have many regular games.

However, more recently, they have entered some of the cup competitions organized by the North Caledonian Football Association.

The latest most noticeable event to take place in Shetland was the 2005 Island Games: many of the group matches were played on pitches all around Shetland, and the final was at Gilbertson Park.

=== 2005 Island Games ===
Match: Final

Shetland Islands 2 (0) V 0 (0) Guernsey

Time: 16:00 Date: Friday 15 July 2005 Venue: Gilbertson Park

==== Group 1 matches ====
Pos.	Team	Played	Won	Draw	Lost	For	Against	Diff.	Points
1st	Shetland	4	3	1	0	8	1	7	10
2nd	Isle of Man	4	2	1	1	12	3	9	7
3rd	Saaremaa	4	1	2	1	5	5	0	5
4th	Åland	4	1	0	3	4	7	–3	3
5th	Falkland Islands	4	1	0	3	3	16	–13	3

== Current squad ==
This is the squad that competed in the 2023 Milne Cup held in Shetland.

Goalkeepers

Andrew Goodlad (Celtic), Rory Henderson (Scalloway)

Defenders

Lorne McNiven (Whitedale), Liam Flaws (Ness Utd), Josh Carroll (Spurs), James Farmer (c) (Ness Utd), Jack Clubb (Celtic).

Midfielders

Neil Laurenson (Whalsay), Declan Adamson (Ness Utd), Calvin Leask (Thistle), Brandon McKay (Spurs), James Aitken (Celtic), Harry Thomson (Ness Utd), Ronan Grant (Spurs).

Forwards

Sam Maver (Spurs), Finn Regan (Celtic).

Coaches Neil Fenwick (Manager), Richard Arthur (Coach), Bruce McCulloch (Coach), Craig Dinwoodie (GK Coach), Martin Leyland (Conditioning).

== Notable players ==
- (Shetland) Duncan Bray - inducted in University of Southern Indiana Athletic Hall of Fame (United States)

== Tournament records ==
=== Island Games record ===
Island Games record
Year	Round	Position	GP	W	D	L	GS	GA
(Faroe Islands) 1989	Group stage	5th	4	0	0	4	1	13
(Åland) 1991	Group stage	5th	4	2	0	2	7	8
(Isle of Wight) 1993	Group stage	7th	4	1	0	3	3	10
(Gibraltar) 1995	Did not enter							
(Jersey) 1997	Group stage	5th	4	2	1	1	4	6
(Gotland) 1999	Group stage	10th	5	2	0	3	14	14
(Isle of Man) 2001	Group stage	8th	4	1	2	1	6	7
(Guernsey) 2003	Group stage	7th	5	2	1	2	10	8
(Shetland) 2005	Champions	1st	5	4	1	0	10	1
(Rhodes) 2007	Did not enter							
(Åland) 2009	Group stage	13th	4	1	1	2	7	9
(Isle of Wight) 2011	Did not enter							
(Bermuda) 2013	Did not enter							
(Jersey) 2015	Fourth place	4th	5	2	1	2	10	5
(Gotland) 2017	Group stage	10th	4	1	0	3	7	12
(Gibraltar) 2019 (Note: No football tournament held. (Replaced by 2019 Inter Games Football Tournament in Anglesey).)	Fourth place	4th	4	1	0	3	8	8
(Guernsey) 2023	Group stage	7th	4	3	0	1	12	6
(Orkney) 2025	Group stage	6th	3	0	2	1	4	5
Total	1 title	14/18	59	22	9	28	103	112

=== North Atlantic Cup ===
Note: 2 points for a win era.

Year	Position	GP	W	D	L	GF	GA	GD	Points
1968–1973	2nd	8	3	1	4	18	21	-3	7

=== Milne Cup ===
Including Kirkwall vs. Lerwick

Location	W	D	L	GF	GA	GD
(Shetland) (Orkney) 1908–2020	57	6	39	230	184	46

- 61 Milne Cup wins

=== Mitchell and Sutherland Shields ===
==== Mitchell Shield ====
Location	W	D	L	GF	GA	GD
(Shetland) (Orkney) 2006–2014	9	0	0	59	10	49

- 9 Mitchell shields wins

==== Sutherland Shield ====
Location	W	D	L	GF	GA	GD
(Shetland) (Orkney) 2007, 2008, 2011	2	0	1	21	9	12

- 2 Sutherland Shield wins

== Selected International opponents ==
Last update: 26 July 2009

Opponents	Matches	Win	Draw	Loss	GF	GA	GD	Win%
Åland	4	1	0	3	5	8	−3	25.00
Falkland Islands	1	1	0	0	4	0	+4	100.00
Faroe Islands	24	6	2	16	37	66	−29	25.00
Frøya	1	1	0	0	3	1	+2	100.00
Gibraltar	4	3	0	1	6	5	+1	75.00
Greenland	3	1	0	2	9	7	+2	33.33
Guernsey	3	2	0	1	9	7	+2	66.67
Hitra	2	2	0	0	6	2	+4	100.00
Isle of Man	4	1	1	2	5	9	−4	25.00
Isle of Wight	2	0	1	1	0	2	−2	0.00
Jersey	2	0	0	2	0	7	−7	0.00
Menorca	1	0	1	0	2	2	+0	0.00
Orkney	86	50	4	32	207	156	+51	58.14
Saaremaa	3	2	1	0	6	4	+2	66.67
Western Isles	2	0	0	2	1	4	−3	0.00
Ynys Môn	4	0	1	3	2	10	−8	0.00

== Honours ==
=== Non-FIFA competitions ===
- Island Games:
  - Gold medal: 2005

=== Others titles ===
- North Caledonian F.A.
  - Jock Mackay Cup:
    - Winners: 2014–15
