= Football at the 2009 Island Games – Men's tournament =

Men's Football at the Island Games 2009
Tournament details
- Host country: Åland
- Dates: 28 June – 3 July
- Teams: 16
- Venue: 7 (in 7 host cities)

Final positions
- Champions: Jersey (3rd title)
- Runners-up: Åland
- Third place: Guernsey
- Fourth place: Isle of Man

Tournament statistics
- Matches played: 34
- Goals scored: 115 (3.38 per match)
- Top scorer(s): (Gibraltar) Lee Casciaro (Guernsey) Ross Allen (5 goals)

The 2009 Island Games in Åland was the 11th edition in which a men's football tournament was played at the multi-games competition. It was contested by 16 teams.

Jersey won the tournament for the third time.

== Participants ==
- Åland
- Falkland Islands
- Frøya
- Gibraltar
- Gotland
- Greenland
- Guernsey
- Isle of Man
- Isle of Wight
- Jersey
- Menorca
- Rhodes
- Shetland
- Saare County
- Western Isles
- Ynys Môn

== Group Phase ==
=== Group A ===
Rank	Nation	Pld	W	D	L	GF	GA	Pts	GD
1	Åland	3	2	1	0	7	4	7	+3
2	Menorca	3	1	2	0	9	3	5	+6
3	Greenland	3	1	0	2	5	11	3	-6
4	Shetland	3	0	1	2	4	7	1	-3

28 June

Åland	4–2	Greenland
Petter Isaksson 16'; David Welin 33'; Alexander Weckstrom 42'; André Karring 51'		Pavia Mølgaard 58', 90'

Wiklöf Holding Arena, Mariehamn
Attendance: 900

28 June

Shetland	2–2	Menorca
Leighton Flaws 17', 63' (pen.)		David Mas 24', 33'

Hammarvallen, Hammarland

29 June

Menorca	6–0	Greenland
Alejandro Perez Palliser 22'; Pere Rodriguez Prats 27'; Gabriel Llabrés 38'; Jordi Segui 73'; David Mas 76'; John Mercadal 90'

Sportkila, Sund

29 June

Shetland	1–2	Åland
Duncan Bray 15'		Alexander Weckstrom 5'; Simon Snickars 48'

Hammarvallen, Hammarland

30 June

Åland	1–1	Menorca
Andreas Bjork 2' (pen.)		José Barranco 28' (pen.)

Markusböle, Finström

30 June

Greenland	3–1	Shetland
Hans Knudsen 6'; Pavia Mølgaard 65', 90'		Leighton Flaws 24'

Sportkila, Sund

=== Group B ===
Rank	Nation	Pld	W	D	L	GF	GA	Pts	GD
1	Guernsey	3	2	1	0	10	0	7	+10
2	Ynys Môn	3	2	0	1	6	3	6	+3
3	Gibraltar	3	1	1	1	9	3	4	+6
4	Frøya	3	0	0	3	0	19	0	-19

28 June

Gibraltar	0–0	Guernsey

Solvallen, Eckerö

28 June

Ynys Môn	3–0	Frøya
Edward Rhys Roberts 5'; Melvin McGinnes 6', 80'

Vikingavallen, Jomala

29 June

Ynys Môn	0–2	Guernsey
		Glyn Dyer 57'; Ross Allen 84'

Vikingavallen, Jomala

29 June

Frøya	0–8	Gibraltar
		Lee Casciaro 25', 46', 56'; Joseph Chipolina 42', 43'; Jeremy Lopez 63', 86'; Aaron Payas 90' (pen.)

Solvallen, Eckerö

30 June

Gibraltar	1–3	Ynys Môn
Al Greene 76'		Melvin McGinnes 78'; Mark Evans 88' (pen.), 90'

Hammarvallen, Hammarland

30 June

Guernsey	8–0	Frøya
David Rihoy 7', 64', 65'; Ross Allen 10' (pen.), 54', 70'; Richard Meland 56' (o.g.); Joby Bourgaize 86'

Vikingavallen, Jomala

=== Group C ===
Rank	Nation	Pld	W	D	L	GF	GA	Pts	GD
1	Jersey	3	3	0	0	6	1	9	+7
2	Rhodes	3	2	0	1	5	1	6	+4
3	Isle of Wight	3	1	0	2	6	7	3	-1
4	Saare County	3	0	0	3	1	9	0	-8

28 June

Rhodes	2–0	Isle of Wight
Savvas Pafiakis 79'; Antonis Georgalis 90'

Sportkila, Sund

28 June

Saare County	0–1	Jersey
		Mark Lucas 9'

Rangsby, Saltvik

29 June

Jersey	1–0	Rhodes
Ross Crick 40'

Rangsby, Saltvik

29 June

Isle of Wight	5–1	Saare County
Kristjan Leedo 22' (o.g.); Alek Przespolewski 41'; Chris Elliot 45' (pen.); David Greening 65', 90'		Sander Laht 49' (pen.)

Hammarvallen, Hammarland

30 June

Rhodes	3–0	Saare County
Xipas Antunis 16'; Antonis Georgalis 17'; Eleftherios Mavromoustakos 51'

Rangsby, Saltvik

30 June

Jersey	4–1	Isle of Wight
Ross Crick 10'; Russell Le Feuvre 78'; Jack Cannon 85' (pen.); Craig Russell 90'		Darren Powell 33'

Hammarvallen, Hammarland

=== Group D ===
Rank	Nation	Pld	W	D	L	Pts	GF	GA	GD
1	Isle of Man	3	3	0	0	11	3	9	+8
2	Western Isles	3	2	0	1	9	7	6	+2
3	Gotland	3	1	0	2	5	6	3	-1
4	Falkland Islands	3	0	0	3	2	11	0	-9

28 June

Western Isles	2–1	Gotland
David Angus Macmillan 5'; Niall Gibson 90'		Kenneth Budin 49'

Hammarvallen, Hammarland

28 June

Falkland Islands	1–2	Isle of Man
Nick Hurt 74' (o.g.)		Christopher Bass 22'; Stephen Glover 62'

Solvallen, Eckerö

29 June

Isle of Man	5–0	Western Isles
Christopher Bass 6', 65'; Stephen Glover 16', 41'; Jack McVey 90'

Markusböle, Finström

29 June

Gotland	2–0	Falkland Islands
Andreas Kraft 55'; Bjorn Nyman 80' (pen.)

Vikingavallen, Jomala

30 June

Western Isles	7–1	Falkland Islands
Niall Gibson 9'; Hector Macphee 35'; Donald Macphail 58', 88'; John Morrison 73' (pen.); Martin Maclean 74'; Andrew Murray 90'		Mark Lennon 49'

Solvallen, Eckerö

30 June

Isle of Man	4–2	Gotland
Callum Morrissey 19', 45'; Kevin Megson 36'; Nick Hurt 42'		Andreas Kraft 5'

Markusböle, Finström

== Placement play-off matches ==
=== 15th place match ===
2 July

Falkland Islands	1–3	Frøya
Wayne Clement 5'		Richard Meland 39'; Martin Gaaso 52'; Joran Adolfsen 68'

Vikingavalenn, Jomala

=== 13th place match ===
2 July

Shetland	3–2	Saare County
Erik Thomson 33', 88', 91'		Umas Rajaver 42', 56'

Hammarvallen, Hammarland

=== 11th place match ===
2 July

Gotland	4–3	Greenland
Peter Ohman 10', 15'; Emil Segerlund 22'; Andrean Lindblom 53'		Peri Fleischer 17', 68'; Kaati Lund Mathiassen 44'

Vikingavalenn, Jomala

=== 9th place match ===
3 July

Gibraltar	3–0	Isle of Wight
Lee Casciaro 21', 63'; Al Greene 76'

Vikingavalenn, Jomala

=== 7th place match ===
3 July

Menorca	4–1	Western Isles
Marc Pons 18'; John Mercadal 36', 75'; David Mas 90'		Hector MacPhee 56'

Vikingavalenn, Jomala

=== 5th place match ===
3 July

Rhodes	4–0	Ynys Môn
Theoharis Moshis 30'; Eleftherios Mavromoustakos 37'; Michail Manias 43', 84'

Solvallen, Eckerö

== Final stage ==
=== Semi-finals ===
2 July

Isle of Man	1–2	Åland
Calum Morrissey 24'	(a.e.t.)	Alexander Weckstrom 45'; Jimmy Sundman 93'

Vikingavalenn, Jomala

2 July

Guernsey	0–2	Jersey
		Ross Crick 38'; Mark Lucas 90'

Sportkila, Sund

=== 3rd place match ===
3 July

Isle of Man	0–5	Guernsey
		Craig Young 34'; Simon Tostevin 68', 86', 90'; Ross Allen 83'

Solvallen, Eckerö

=== Final ===
3 July
21:00

Åland	1–2	Jersey
Andreas Bjork 84'		Jean-Paul Martyn 18'; Chris Andrews 54'

Wiklöf Holding Arena, Mariehamn
Attendance: 3,000

2009 Island Games Winners
Jersey
Third Title

== Final rankings ==
Rank	Team
Gold medal	Jersey
Silver medal	Åland
Bronze medal	Guernsey
4	Isle of Man
5	Rhodes
6	Ynys Môn
7	Menorca
8	Western Isles
9	Gibraltar
10	Isle of Wight
11	Gotland
12	Greenland
13	Shetland
14	Saare County
15	Frøya
16	Falkland Islands

== Top goalscorers ==
5 goals

- (Gibraltar) Lee Casciaro
- (Guernsey) Ross Allen

4 goals

- (Greenland) Pavia Mølgaard
- (Menorca) David Mas

3 goals

- (Anglesey) Melvin McGinnes
- (Gotland) Andreas Kraft
- (Guernsey) Dave Rihoy
- (Guernsey) Simon Tostevin
- (Isle of Man) Stephen Glover
- (Isle of Man) Calum Morrissey
- (Åland) Alexander Weckström
- (Shetland) Leighton Flaws
- (Shetland) Erik Thomson

== See also ==
- Women's Football at the 2009 Island Games
