= Rhodes football team =

Men's association football team

Rhodes
- Nickname: Σταυροφόροι (Crusaders)
- Association: Hellenic Football Federation (HFF)
- Head coach: Petros Michos
First colours	Second colours

First international
- Rhodes 1–1 Ynys Môn (Gotland, 27 June 1999)

Biggest win
- Rhodes 6–1 Orkney (Guernsey, 29 June 2003)

Biggest defeat
- Rhodes 0–4 Gibraltar (Rhodes, 6 July 2007)

Island Games
- Appearances: 5 (first in 1999)
- Best result: Runners-up (2007)

The Rhodes football team is the football team which represents the island of Rhodes. Previously members of the International Island Games Association, participating in the biannual Island Games, the team was disqualified at the 2011 edition and subsequently withdrew from the organisation. Rhodes is not a member of FIFA or UEFA, it is an island within Greece and plays under the auspices of the Hellenic Football Federation, the governing body for football in Greece.

== Notable players ==
- Michail Manias

== Selected internationals in Island Games ==
Date	Venue		Opponent	Score
Jun 27, 2011	Isle of Wight	Rhodes	Jersey	0-2
Jun 26, 2011	Isle of Wight	Rhodes	Greenland	2–1
Jul 3, 2009	Åland	Rhodes	Western Isles	4–0
Jun 30, 2009	Åland	Rhodes	Saaremaa	3–0
Jun 29, 2009	Åland	Rhodes	Jersey	0–1
Jun 28, 2009	Åland	Rhodes	Isle of Wight	2–0
Jul 6, 2007	Rhodes	Rhodes	Gibraltar	0–4
Jul 4, 2007	Rhodes	Rhodes	Western Isles	1–0
Jul 2, 2007	Rhodes	Rhodes	Frøya	3–1
Jun 30, 2007	Rhodes	Rhodes	Saaremaa	2–0
Jun 1, 2003	Guernsey	Rhodes	Guernsey	1–2
Jun 30, 2003	Guernsey	Rhodes	Alderney	5–1
Jun 29, 2003	Guernsey	Rhodes	Orkney	6–1
Jul 13, 2001	Isle of Man	Rhodes	Gibraltar	0–2
Jul 12, 2001	Isle of Man	Rhodes	Isle of Man	3–1
Jul 10, 2001	Isle of Man	Rhodes	Isle of Wight	1–4
Jul 9, 2001	Isle of Man	Rhodes	Greenland	2–0
Jul 2, 1999	Gotland	Rhodes	Åland	3–2
Jul 1, 1999	Gotland	Rhodes	Greenland	2–0
Jun 28, 1999	Gotland	Rhodes	Guernsey	0–0
Jun 27, 1999	Gotland	Rhodes	(Wales) Ynys Môn	1–1

== Tournament records ==
=== Island Games record ===
Year	Round	Position	GP	W	D	L	GS	GA
(Gotland) 1999	5th Place Match	5th	4	2	2	0	6	3
(Isle of Man) 2001	5th Place Match	5th	4	2	0	2	6	7
(Guernsey) 2003	Withdrew		2	2	0	0	11	2
(Rhodes) 2007	Runners-up	2nd	4	3	0	1	6	5
(Åland) 2009	5th place Match	5th	4	3	0	1	9	1
(Isle of Wight) 2011		15th (DSQ)	3	1	0	2	2	6
Total	6/11	5/6	21	13	2	6	40	24

== Honours ==
=== Non-FIFA competitions ===
- Island Games
  - Silver medal (1): 2007
