= 1987 Island Games =

International multi-sport event

- Host: Guernsey
- Teams: 18 islands
- Athletes: 1049
- Events: 9
- Opening: September 10, 1987
- Closing: September 17, 1987
- Main venue: Footes Lane

The 1987 Island Games were the second edition of Island Games, and were held in Guernsey, from 10 to 17 September 1987.

== Medal table ==
* Host nation (Guernsey)

Rank	Nation	Gold	Silver	Bronze	Total
1	Isle of Man	26	30	23	79
2	Jersey	23	20	28	71
3	Guernsey*	17	19	28	64
4	Gotland	15	7	5	27
5	Åland	7	9	9	25
6	Malta	6	1	2	9
7	Isle of Wight	3	4	10	17
8	Gibraltar	2	3	3	8
9	Iceland	2	2	2	6
10	Faroe Islands	1	2	5	8
11	Orkney	1	1	2	4
12	Shetland	1	0	3	4
13	(Wales) Ynys Môn/Anglesey	0	3	3	6
14	Sark	0	1	0	1
15	Alderney	0	0	0	0
15	Frøya	0	0	0	0
15	Hitra Municipality	0	0	0	0
15	Saint Helena	0	0	0	0
Totals (18 entries)		104	102	123	329

== Sports ==
The sports chosen for the games were:

- Badminton - see results
- Archery - see results
- Table tennis - see results
- Bowling - see results
- Volleyball - see results
- Athletics - see results
- Shooting - see results
- Cycling - see results
- Swimming - see results
