= 1985 Island Games =

International multi-sport event

- Host: Isle of Man
- Teams: 15 islands
- Athletes: 700
- Events: 7
- Opening: July 18, 1985
- Closing: July 24, 1985
- Opened by: Elizabeth II
- Main venue: National Stadium

The 1985 Inter-Island Games were the first Island Games and were held in Isle of Man from 18 to 24 July 1985, as part of the Isle of Man International Year of Sport.

== Medal table ==
* Host nation (Isle of Man)

Rank	Nation	Gold	Silver	Bronze	Total
1	Isle of Man*	25	20	25	70
2	Guernsey	13	8	16	37
3	Åland	9	2	4	15
4	Jersey	8	12	2	22
5	Isle of Wight	8	9	9	26
6	Gotland	3	8	2	13
7	Orkney	3	6	6	15
8	Iceland	3	1	3	7
9	Frøya	1	1	2	4
10	Faroe Islands	0	2	1	3
11	(Wales) Ynys Môn/Anglesey	0	1	1	2
12	Malta	0	1	0	1
13	Shetland	0	0	4	4
14	Saint Helena	0	0	1	1
15	Hitra Municipality	0	0	0	0
Totals (15 entries)		73	71	76	220

== Sports ==
The sports chosen for the games were:

- Athletics - see results
- Badminton - see results
- Cycling - see results
- Five-a-side football - see results
- Shooting - see results
- Swimming - see results
- Volleyball - see results
