= Mickey Mouse (disambiguation) =

Mickey Mouse is a fictional cartoon character and mascot created by The Walt Disney Company.

Mickey Mouse may also refer to:

== Film and television ==
- Mickey Mouse (film series), 1928–2013
- Mickey Mouse (TV series), 2013–2019

== Comics ==
- Mickey Mouse (comic strip), 1930–1976
- Mickey Mouse (comic book) or Mickey Mouse and Friends, a comic book series, 1941–present
- Walt Disney's Mickey Mouse, a comic book series, 2011–present

== Other uses ==
- Mickey Mouse universe, a fictional shared universe which is the setting for stories involving Disney cartoon characters Mickey Mouse etc.
- Works based on a copyright-free Mickey Mouse, notable re-imaginings of the early Mickey Mouse cartoon image
- Mickey Mouse (Last Week Tonight with John Oliver), a fictional character and mascot from the American late-night talk show Last Week Tonight with John Oliver
- Mickey Mouse degrees, used pejoratively to describe university degree courses as worthless or irrelevant
- Mickey Mouse cup, used pejoratively in British football to describe cup competitions regarded as less prestigious than major trophies, especially the EFL Cup
- Mickey Mouse connector, an IEC 60320 standard specifying the size and shape of power couplers
- Mickey Mouse money, a derogatory term used by some Filipinos for the Japanese government–issued Philippine peso in World War II
- Mickey Mousing, a film technique that syncs the accompanying music with the actions on screen

== See also ==
- Mickey Mouse Adventures, a comic book series, 1990–1991, 2004–2006
- Lego Mickey Mouse, a Disney-licensed Lego toy line, 2000-2002
- Mickey Mouse Weekly, a Disney-licensed British comic, 1936-1957
- Mickey Mouse in Vietnam, a 1970 unlicensed film
- Mickey Mouse Works, a TV series, 1999–2000
- Mickey Mouse Clubhouse, a TV series, 2006–2016
- List of Mickey Mouse films and appearances
- Mickey's Mouse Tracks, a TV series, 1992-1995
- Topolino, eponymous Italian language Disney-licensed comic book series, 1932-present
- Minnie Mouse
