= British Isles =

Archipelago in north-western Europe

Other native names: Éire agus an Bhreatain Mhór (Irish); Ynysoedd Prydain (Welsh); Enesow Bretennek (Cornish); Eileanan Bhreatainn (Scottish Gaelic); Ny h-Ellanyn Goaldagh (Manx); Îles Britanniques (French); Breetish Isles (Scots)
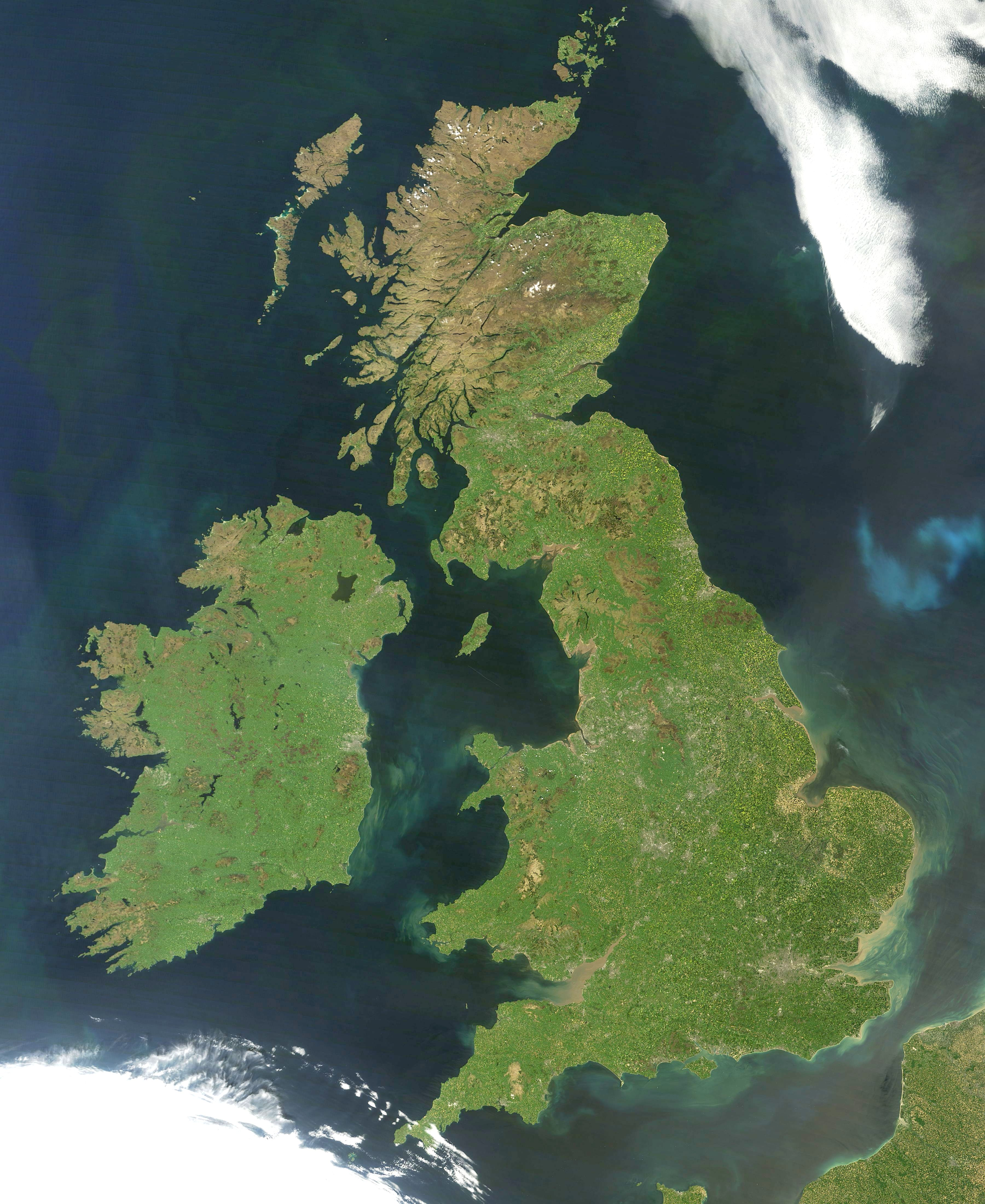
- A 2012 NASA satellite image of the British Isles, excluding Shetland and the Channel Islands which are out of the frame

Geography
- Location: North-western Europe
- Coordinates: 55°N 4°W
- Adjacent to: Atlantic Ocean
- Total islands: 6,000+
- Area: 315,159 km^{2} (121,684 sq mi)
- Highest elevation: 1,345 m (4413 ft)
- Highest point: Ben Nevis, Scotland

Demographics
- Population: 71,891,524 (2019)
- Pop. density: 216/km^{2} (559/sq mi)
- Languages: English; Welsh; Cornish; Irish; Manx; Scots; Scottish Gaelic; French; Guernésiais; Jèrriais; Sercquiais; Shelta; Ulster-Scots; Angloromani; Beurla Reagaird; British Sign Language; Irish Sign Language

Additional information
- Time zone: Greenwich Mean Time; Western European Time (UTC+0)
  - Summer (DST): Western European Summer Time^{[a]} (UTC+1)
- Drives on the: left
- 1. Irish Standard Time in the Republic of Ireland, British Summer Time in the United Kingdom and associated territories.

The British Isles (Note: Irish: Éire agus an Bhreatain Mhór, "Ireland and Great Britain"; Welsh: Ynysoedd Prydain; Cornish: Enesow Bretennek; Scottish Gaelic: Eileanan Bhreatainn; Manx: Ny h-Ellanyn Goaldagh; French: Îles Britanniques) are an archipelago in the North Atlantic Ocean off the north-western coast of continental Europe, consisting of the islands of Great Britain, Ireland, the Isle of Man, the Inner and Outer Hebrides, the Northern Isles (Orkney and Shetland), and over six thousand smaller islands. They have a total area of 315,159 km^{2} (121,684 sq mi) and a combined population of almost 75 million, and include two sovereign states, the Republic of Ireland (which covers roughly five-sixths of Ireland) and the United Kingdom of Great Britain and Northern Ireland. The Channel Islands, off the north coast of France, are normally taken to be part of the British Isles, even though geographically they do not form part of the archipelago. Under the UK Interpretation Act 1978, the Channel Islands are clarified as forming part of the British Islands, not to be confused with the British Isles.

The oldest rocks are 2.7 billion years old and are found in Ireland, Wales and the north-west of Scotland. During the Silurian period, the north-western regions collided with the south-east, which had been part of a separate continental landmass. The topography of the islands is modest in scale by global standards. Ben Nevis, the highest mountain, rises to only 1,345 metres (4,413 ft), and Lough Neagh, which is notably larger than other lakes in the island group, covers 390 square kilometres (151 sq mi). The climate is temperate marine, with cool winters and warm summers. The North Atlantic drift brings significant moisture and raises temperatures 11 °C (20 °F) above the global average for the latitude. This led to a landscape that was long dominated by temperate rainforest, although human activity has since cleared the vast majority of forest cover. The region was re-inhabited after the last glacial period of Quaternary glaciation, by 12,000 BC, when Great Britain was still part of a peninsula of the European continent. Ireland was connected to Great Britain by the British-Irish Ice Sheet before 14,000 BC, and was not inhabited until after 8000 BC. Great Britain became an island by 7000 BC with the flooding of Doggerland.

The Gaels (Ireland), Picts (northern Great Britain) and Britons (southern Great Britain), all speaking Insular Celtic languages, inhabited the islands at the beginning of the 1st millennium BC. Much of Brittonic-occupied Britain was conquered by the Roman Empire from AD 43. The first Anglo-Saxons arrived as Roman power waned in the 5th century, and eventually they dominated the bulk of what is now England. Viking invasions began in the 9th century, followed by more permanent settlements and political change, particularly in England. The Norman conquest of England in 1066 and the later Angevin partial conquest of Ireland from 1169 led to the imposition of a new Norman ruling elite across much of Britain and parts of Ireland. By the Late Middle Ages, Great Britain was separated into the Kingdom of England and Kingdom of Scotland, while control in Ireland fluxed between Gaelic kingdoms, Hiberno-Norman lords and the English-dominated Lordship of Ireland, soon restricted only to the Pale. The 1603 Union of the Crowns, Acts of Union 1707 and Acts of Union 1800 aimed to consolidate Great Britain and Ireland into a single political unit, the United Kingdom of Great Britain and Ireland, with the Isle of Man and the Channel Islands remaining as Crown Dependencies. The expansion of the British Empire and migrations following the Irish Famine and Highland Clearances resulted in the dispersal of some of the islands' population and culture throughout the world, and rapid depopulation of Ireland in the second half of the 19th century. Most of Ireland seceded from the United Kingdom after the Irish War of Independence and the subsequent Anglo-Irish Treaty (1919–1922), with six counties remaining in the UK as Northern Ireland.

As a term, "British Isles" is a geographical name and not a political unit; nevertheless, there are objections to its usage in relation to Ireland due to the political interpretation of the word "British". The Government of Ireland does not officially recognise the term and its embassy in London discourages its use. "Britain and Ireland" is used as an alternative description, and "Atlantic Archipelago" has also seen limited use in academia, as has "Anglo-Celtic Isles". In official documents created jointly by Ireland and the United Kingdom, such as the Good Friday Agreement, the term "these islands" is used.

== Etymology ==
The earliest known references to the islands as a group appeared in the writings of seafarers from the ancient Greek colony of Massalia. The original records have been lost; however, later writings, e.g. Avienius's Ora maritima, that quoted from the Massaliote Periplus (6th century BC) and from Pytheas's On the Ocean (around 325–320 BC) have survived.

In the 1st century BC, Diodorus Siculus has Prettanikē nēsos, "the British Island", and Prettanoi, "the Britons", describes Julius Caesar as having "advanced the Roman Empire as far as the British Isles" (Greek: μέχρι τῶν Βρεττανικῶν νήσων, romanized: mékhri tôn Brettanikôn nḗsōn), and remarks on the region "about the British Isles" (τὸ περὶ τὰς Βρεττανικὰς νήσους, tò perì tàs Brettanikàs nḗsous). According to Philip Freeman in 2001, "it seems reasonable, especially at this early point in classical knowledge of the Irish, for Diodorus or his sources to think of all inhabitants of the Brettanic Isles as Brettanoi".

Strabo used Βρεττανική (Brettanike), and Marcian of Heraclea, in his Periplus maris exteri, used αἱ Πρεττανικαί νῆσοι (the Prettanic Isles) to refer to the islands.

According to A. L. F. Rivet and Colin Smith in 1979 "the earliest instance of the name which is textually known to us" is in The Histories of Polybius, who referred to them as: αἱ Βρεταννικαί νήσοι, romanized: hai Bretannikai nēsoi, lit. 'the Brettanic Islands' or 'the British Isles'. According to Rivet and Smith, this name encompassed "Britain with Ireland". According to Thomas O'Loughlin in 2018, the British Isles was "a concept already present in the minds of those living in continental Europe since at least the 2nd–cent. CE".

Historians today, though not in absolute agreement, largely agree that these Greek and Latin names were probably drawn from native Celtic-language names for the archipelago. Along these lines, the inhabitants of the islands were called the Πρεττανοί (Priteni or Pretani). The shift from the "P" of Pretannia to the "B" of Britannia by the Romans occurred during the time of Julius Caesar.

Greco-Egyptian Claudius Ptolemy referred to the larger island as great Britain (μεγάλη Βρεττανία megale Brettania) and to Ireland as little Britain (μικρὰ Βρεττανία mikra Brettania) in his work Almagest (147–148 AD). According to Philip Freeman in 2001, Ptolemy "is the only ancient writer to use the name "Little Britain" for Ireland, though in doing so he is well within the tradition of earlier authors who pair a smaller Ireland with a larger Britain as the two Brettanic Isles". In the second book of Ptolemy's Geography (c. 150 AD), the second and third chapters are respectively titled in Greek: Κεφ. βʹ Ἰουερνίας νήσου Βρεττανικῆς θέσις, romanized: Iouernías nḗsou Brettanikê̄s thésis, lit. 'Ch. 2, position of Hibernia, a British island' and Κεφ. γʹ Ἀλβουίωνος νήσου Βρεττανικῆς θέσις, Albouíōnos nḗsou Brettanikê̄s thésis, 'Ch. 3, position of Albion, a British island'.

In Arabic geography and cartography in the medieval Islamic world, the British Isles are known as Jazāʾir Barṭāniya or Jazāʾir Barṭīniya. Arabic geographies, including the Kitāb az-Zīj of al-Battānī, mention the British Isles as twelve islands.

John Skelton's English translation of Diodorus Siculus's Bibliotheca historica, written in the middle 1480s, mentions the British Isles as the yles of Bretayne. Thomas Twyne's English translation of Dionysius Periegetes's Orbis descriptio, published in 1572, mentions the British Isles as the Iles of Britannia. The earliest citation of the phrase Brytish Iles in the Oxford English Dictionary is in a work by John Dee dated 1577.

Other names used to describe the islands include the Anglo-Celtic Isles, Atlantic archipelago (a term coined by the historian J. G. A. Pocock in 1975), British-Irish Isles, Britain and Ireland, UK and Ireland, and British Isles and Ireland. Owing to political and national associations with the word British, the Government of Ireland does not use the term British Isles and in documents drawn up jointly between the British and Irish governments, the archipelago is referred to simply as "these islands". British Isles is the most widely accepted term for the archipelago.

== Geography ==
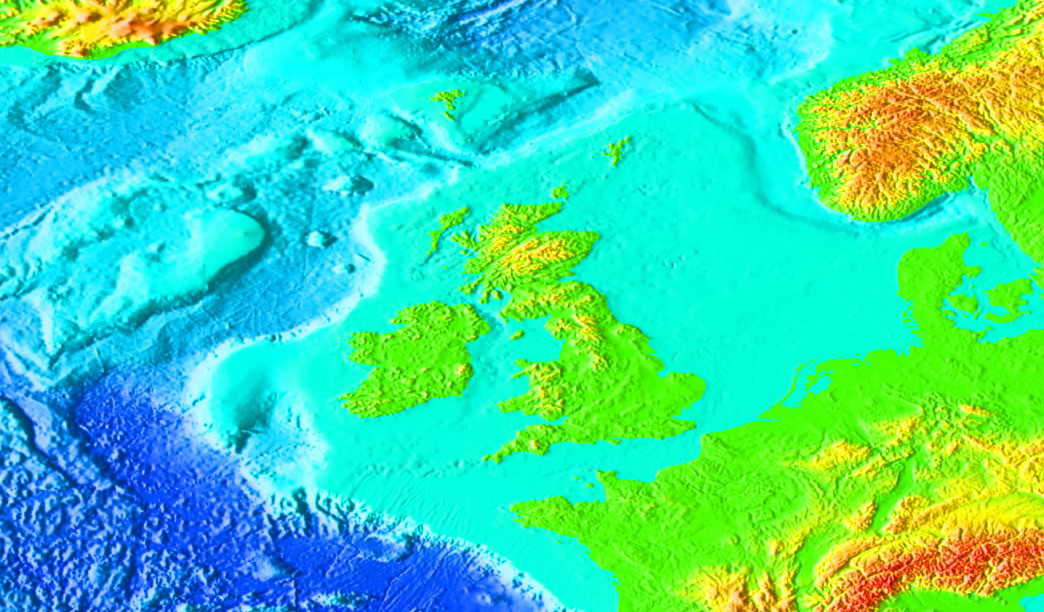
The British Isles in relation to the north-west European continental shelf

The British Isles lie at the juncture of several regions with past episodes of tectonic mountain building. These orogenic belts form a complex geology that records a huge and varied span of Earth's history. Of particular note was the Caledonian orogeny during the Ordovician and early Silurian periods, when the craton Baltica collided with the terrane Avalonia to form the mountains and hills in northern Britain and Ireland. Baltica formed roughly the north-western half of Ireland and Scotland. Further collisions caused the Variscan orogeny in the Devonian and Carboniferous periods, forming the hills of Munster, south-west England, and southern Wales. Over the last 500 million years the land that forms the islands has drifted north-west from around 30°S, crossing the equator around 370 million years ago to reach its present northern latitude.

The islands have been shaped by numerous glaciations during the Quaternary Period, the most recent being the Devensian. As this ended, the central Irish Sea was deglaciated and the English Channel flooded, with sea levels rising to current levels some 8,000 years ago, leaving the British Isles in their current form.

There are about 136 permanently inhabited islands in the group, the largest two being Great Britain and Ireland. Great Britain is to the east and covers 83,700 sq mi (217,000 km^{2}). Ireland is to the west and covers 32,590 sq mi (84,400 km^{2}). The largest of the other islands are to be found in the Hebrides, Orkney and Shetland to the north, Anglesey and the Isle of Man between Great Britain and Ireland, and the Channel Islands near the coast of France. The most densely populated island is Portsea Island, which has an area of 9.5 mi^{2} (25 km^{2}) but has the third highest population behind Great Britain and Ireland.

The islands are at relatively low altitudes, with central Ireland and southern Great Britain particularly low-lying: the lowest point in the islands is the North Slob in County Wexford, Ireland, with an elevation of −3.0 metres (−9.8 ft). The Scottish Highlands in the northern part of Great Britain are mountainous, with Ben Nevis being the highest point on the islands at 1,345 m (4,413 ft). Other mountainous areas include Wales and parts of Ireland, although only seven peaks in these areas reach above 1,000 m (3,281 ft). Lakes on the islands are generally not large, although Lough Neagh in Northern Ireland is an exception, covering 150 square miles (390 km^{2}). The largest freshwater body in Great Britain by area is Loch Lomond at 27.5 square miles (71 km^{2}) and Loch Ness is the largest by volume whilst Loch Morar is the deepest freshwater body in the British Isles, with a maximum depth of 310 m (1,017 ft). There are a number of major rivers within the British Isles. The longest is the Shannon in Ireland at 224 mi (360 km). The river Severn at 220 mi (354 km) is the longest in Great Britain.

=== Climate ===
The climate of the British Isles is mild, moist and changeable with abundant rainfall and a lack of temperature extremes. It is defined as a temperate oceanic climate, or Cfb on the Köppen climate classification system, a classification it shares with most of north-west Europe. The North Atlantic Drift (Gulf Stream), which flows from the Gulf of Mexico, brings with it significant moisture and raises temperatures 11 °C (20 °F) above the global average for the islands' latitudes. Most Atlantic depressions pass to the north of the islands; combined with the general westerly circulation and interactions with the landmass, this imposes a general east–west variation in climate. There are four distinct climate patterns: south-east, with cold winters, warm and dry summers; south-west, having mild and very wet winters, warm and wet summers; north-west, generally wet with mild winters and cool summers; and north-east with cold winters, cool summers.

== Flora and fauna ==
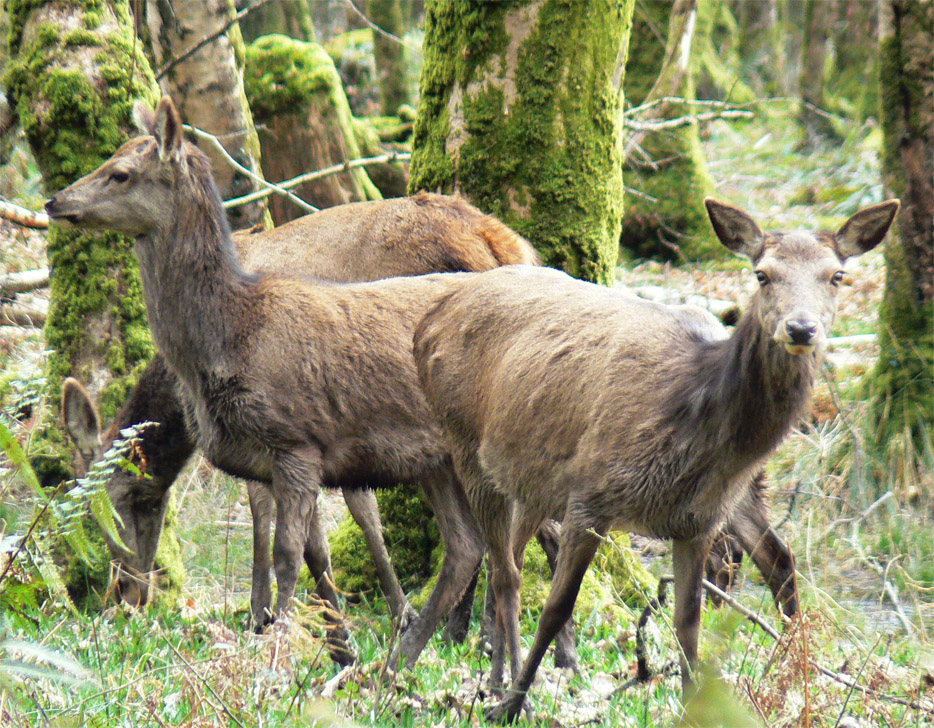
Red deer hinds in Killarney National Park, Ireland

The islands have a mild climate and varied soils, giving rise to a diverse pattern of vegetation. Animal and plant life is similar to that of the north-western European mainland. However there are fewer numbers of species, with Ireland having even fewer. All native flora and fauna in Ireland is made up of species that migrated primarily from Great Britain. The only window when this could have occurred was prior to the melting of the ice bridge between the two islands 14,000 years ago, approaching the end of the last ice age.

As with most of Europe, prehistoric Britain and Ireland were covered with forest and swamp. Clearing began around 6000 BC and accelerated in medieval times. Despite this, Britain retained its primeval forests longer than most of Europe owing to a small population and later development of trade and industry, and wood shortages were not a problem until the 17th century. By the 18th century most of Britain's forests were consumed for shipbuilding or manufacturing charcoal and the nation was forced to import lumber from Scandinavia, North America and the Baltic. Most forest land in Ireland is maintained by state forestation programmes. Almost all land outside urban areas is farmland. However relatively large areas of forest remain in east and north Scotland and in southeast England. Oak, elm, ash and beech are amongst the most common trees in England. In Scotland pine and birch are most common. Natural forests in Ireland are mainly oak, ash, wych elm, birch and pine. Beech and lime, though not native to Ireland, are also common there. Farmland hosts a variety of semi-natural vegetation of grasses and flowering plants. Woods, hedgerows, mountain slopes and marshes host heather, wild grasses, gorse and bracken.

Many larger animals, such as wolves, bears and European elk, are today extinct. However some species, such as red deer, are protected. Other small mammals, such as rabbits, foxes, badgers, hares, hedgehogs and stoats, are very common and the European beaver has been reintroduced in parts of Scotland. Wild boar have also returned to parts of southern England following escapes from farms and illegal releases. Many rivers contain otters and grey and common seals are numerous on coasts. There are about 250 bird species regularly recorded in Great Britain and another 350 that occur with varying degrees of rarity. The most numerous species are wren, robin, house sparrow, woodpigeon, chaffinch and blackbird. Farmland birds are declining in number, except for those bred for “sport”, such as pheasant, red-legged partridge and red grouse. Fish are abundant in the rivers and lakes, in particular salmon, trout, perch and pike. Sea fish include dogfish, cod, sole, pollock and bass, as well as mussels, crab and oysters along the coast. There are more than 21,000 species of insect.

Few species of reptiles or amphibians are found in Great Britain or Ireland. Only three snakes are native to Great Britain: the adder, the barred grass snake and the smooth snake; none are native to Ireland. In general Great Britain has slightly more variation and native wildlife, with weasels, polecats, wildcats, most shrews, moles, water voles, roe deer and common toads also being absent from Ireland. This pattern is also true for birds and insects. Notable exceptions include the Kerry slug and certain species of woodlouse native to Ireland but not Great Britain.

Domestic and domesticated animals include the Connemara pony, Shetland pony, English Mastiff, Irish Wolfhound and many breeds of cattle and sheep.

== Demographics ==
Population density per km^{2} of the British Isles' regions

England has a generally high population density, with almost 80% of the total population of the islands. Elsewhere in Great Britain and Ireland, high density of population is limited to areas around a few large cities. The largest urban area by far is the Greater London Built-up Area with 9 million inhabitants. Other major population centres include the Greater Manchester Built-up Area (2.4 million), West Midlands conurbation (2.4 million) and West Yorkshire Urban Area (1.6 million) in England, Greater Glasgow (1.2 million) in Scotland and Greater Dublin Area (1.9 million) in Ireland.

The population of England rose rapidly during the 19th and 20th centuries, whereas the populations of Scotland and Wales showed little increase during the 20th century; the population of Scotland has remained unchanged since 1951. Ireland for most of its history had much the same population density as Great Britain (about one-third of the total population). However since the Great Irish Famine the population of Ireland has fallen to less than one-tenth of the population of the British Isles. The famine caused a century-long population decline, drastically reduced the Irish population and permanently altered the demographic make-up of the British Isles. On a global scale, this disaster led to the creation of an Irish diaspora that numbers fifteen times the current population of the island.

The linguistic heritage of the British Isles is rich, with twelve languages from six groups across four branches of the Indo-European family. The Insular Celtic languages of the Goidelic sub-group (Irish, Manx and Scottish Gaelic) and the Brittonic sub-group (Cornish, Welsh and Breton, spoken in north-western France) are the only remaining Celtic languages—the last of their continental relations were extinct before the 7th century. The Norman languages of Guernésiais, Jèrriais and Sercquiais spoken in the Channel Islands are similar to French, a language also spoken there. A cant, called Shelta, is spoken by Irish Travellers, often to conceal meaning from those outside the group. However, English, including Scots, is the dominant language, with few monoglots remaining in the other languages of the region. The Norn language of Orkney and Shetland became extinct around 1880.

=== Urban areas ===
Rank	Urban area	Population	Country
1	London	9,787,426	England
2	Greater Manchester	2,553,379	England
3	West Midlands Conurbation	2,440,986	England
4	West Yorkshire Urban Area	1,777,934	England
5	Glasgow	1,209,143	Scotland
6	Dublin	1,173,179	Republic of Ireland
7	Liverpool	864,122	England
8	South Hampshire	855,569	England
9	Tyneside	774,891	England
10	Nottingham	729,977	England
11	Sheffield	685,386	England
12	Bristol	617,280	England
13	Belfast	595,879	Northern Ireland
14	Leicester	508,916	England
15	Edinburgh	482,005	Scotland
16	Brighton and Hove	474,485	England
17	Bournemouth	466,266	England
18	Cardiff	481,082	Wales
19	Teesside	376,633	England
20	Stoke-on-Trent	372,775	England
21	Coventry	359,262	England
22	Sunderland	335,415	England
23	Birkenhead	325,264	England
24	Reading	318,014	England
25	Kingston-upon-Hull	314,018	England
26	Preston	313,322	England
27	Newport	306,844	Wales
28	Swansea	300,352	Wales
29	Southend-on-Sea	295,310	England
30	Derby	270,468	England
31	Plymouth	260,203	England
32	Luton	258,018	England
33	Southampton	252,397	England
34	Medway	243,931	England
35	Blackpool	239,409	England
36	Milton Keynes	229,431	England
37	Barnsley	223,281	England
38	Cork	222,000	Republic of Ireland
39	Northampton	215,963	England
40	Norwich	213,166	England
41	Aberdeen	207,932	Scotland

== History ==
2.5 million years ago, the British Isles were repeatedly submerged beneath an ice sheet that extended into the middle of the North Sea, with a larger ice sheet that covered a significant proportion of Scandinavia on the opposite side. Around 1.9 million years ago, these two ice sheets frequently merged, and eventually filled in the sea between Scandinavia and northern Great Britain. Further south was a direct land bridge, now known as Doggerland, which was gradually submerged as sea levels rose. However, the Irish Sea was formed before Doggerland was completely covered in water, with Ireland becoming an island roughly 6,000 years before Great Britain did.

The first evidence of human activity on the islands dates from 840,000 or 950,000 years ago, based on flint tools found near Happisburgh on the Norfolk coast of Great Britain. In contrast, the earliest evidence of human activity on the island of Ireland dates from 12,500 years ago.

At the time of the Roman Empire, about two thousand years ago, various tribes which spoke Celtic dialects of the Insular Celtic group inhabited the islands. The Romans expanded their civilisation to control southern Great Britain, but were impeded in advancing any further, building Hadrian's Wall to mark the northern frontier of their empire in 122 AD. At that time, Ireland was populated by a people known as Hiberni, while the northern third of Great Britain was populated by a people known as Picts and the southern two thirds by Britons.

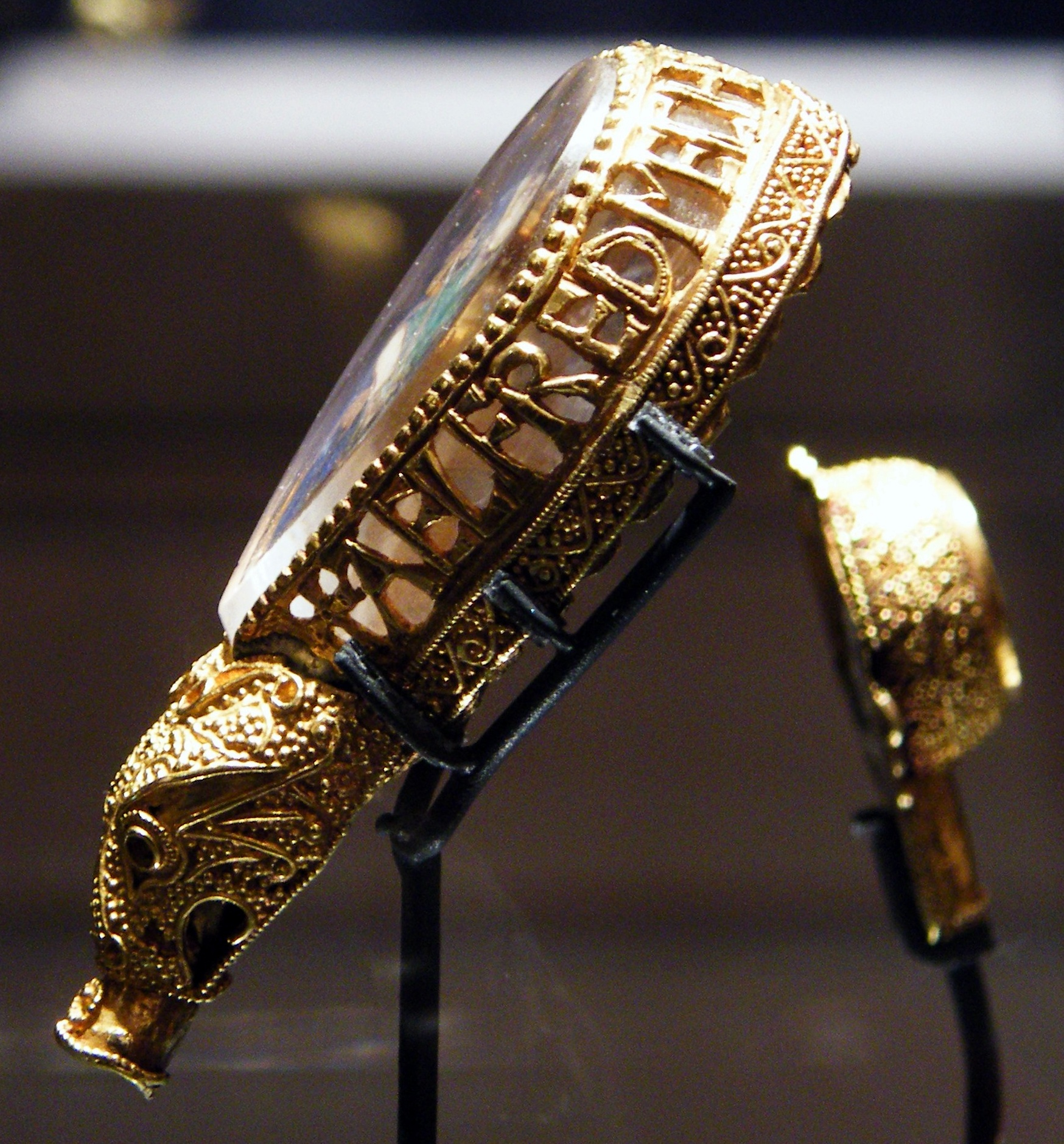
The Alfred Jewel (9th century)

Anglo-Saxons arrived as Roman power waned in the 5th century AD. Their arrival seems to have been at the invitation of the Britons as mercenaries to repulse incursions by the Hiberni and Picts. In time, Anglo-Saxon demands on the British became so great that they came to culturally dominate the bulk of southern Great Britain, though recent genetic evidence suggests Britons still formed the bulk of the population. This dominance created what is now England and left culturally British enclaves only in the north of what is now England, in Cornwall and what is now known as Wales. Ireland had been unaffected by the Romans except, significantly, for being Christianised—traditionally by the Romano-Briton Saint Patrick. As Europe, including Britain, descended into turmoil following the collapse of Roman civilisation, or the Dark Ages, Ireland entered a golden age and responded with missions (first to Great Britain and then to the continent), as well as the founding of monasteries and universities. These were later joined by Anglo-Saxon missions of a similar nature.

Viking invasions began in the 9th century, followed by more permanent settlements, particularly along the east coast of Ireland, the west coast of modern-day Scotland and the Isle of Man. Though the Vikings were eventually neutralised in Ireland, their influence remained in the cities of Dublin, Cork, Limerick, Waterford and Wexford. England, however, was slowly conquered around the turn of the first millennium AD, and eventually became a feudal possession of Denmark. The relations between the descendants of Vikings in England and counterparts in Normandy, in northern France, lay at the heart of a series of events that led to the Norman conquest of England in 1066. The remnants of the Duchy of Normandy, which conquered England, remain associated to the English Crown as the Channel Islands to this day. A century later the marriage of the future Henry II of England to Eleanor of Aquitaine created the Angevin Empire, partially under the French Crown. At the invitation of Diarmait Mac Murchada, a provincial king, and under the authority of Pope Adrian IV (the only Englishman to be elected pope), the Angevins invaded Ireland in 1169. Though initially intended to be kept as an independent kingdom, the failure of the Irish High King to ensure the terms of the Treaty of Windsor led Henry II, as King of England, to rule as effective monarch under the title of Lord of Ireland. This title was granted to his younger son, but when Henry's heir unexpectedly died, the title of King of England and Lord of Ireland became entwined in one person.

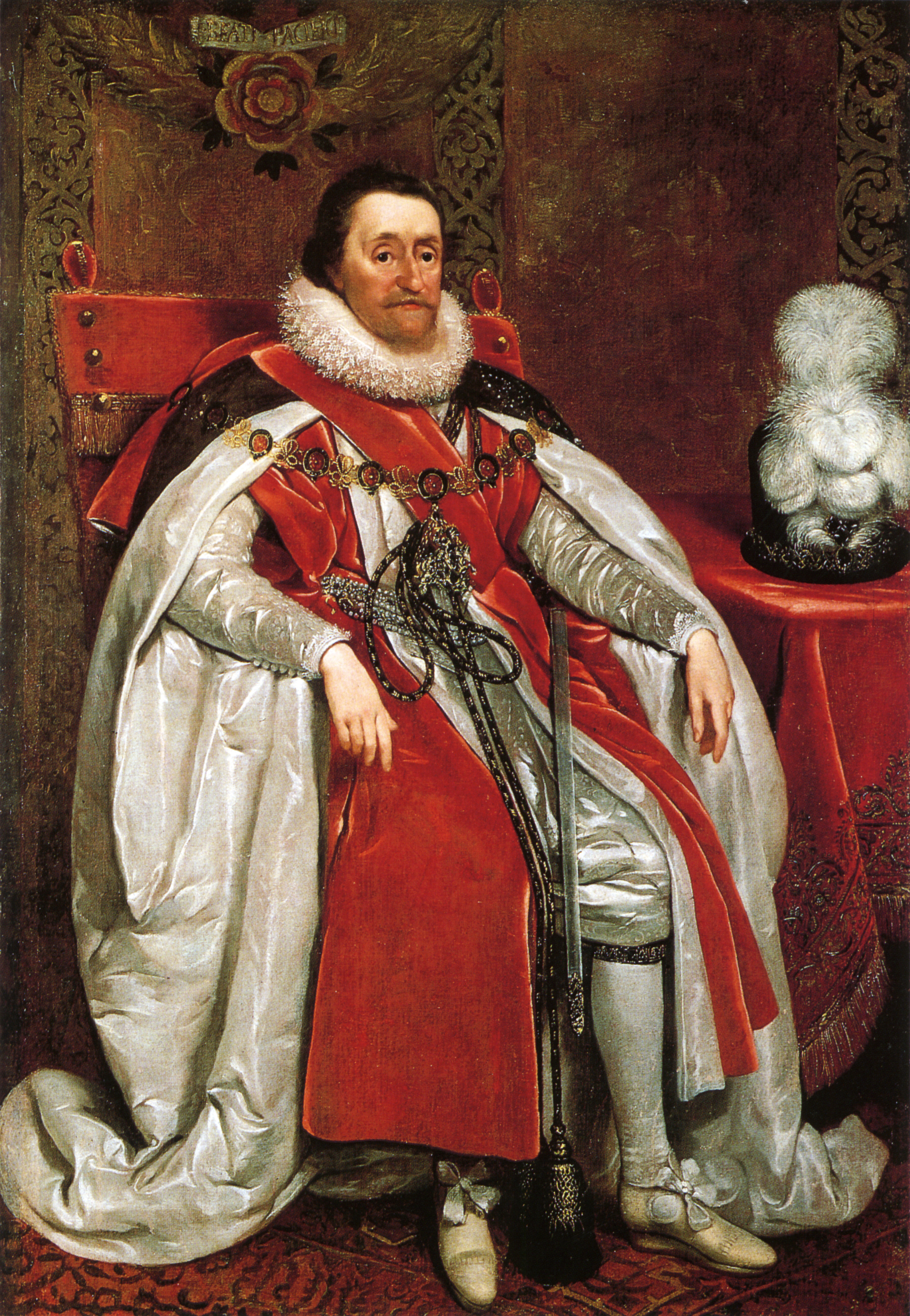
James VI of Scotland (James I of England)

By the Late Middle Ages Great Britain was separated into the Kingdoms of England and Scotland. Power in Ireland fluxed between Gaelic kingdoms, Hiberno-Norman lords and the English-dominated Lordship of Ireland. A similar situation existed in the Principality of Wales, which was slowly being annexed into the Kingdom of England by a series of laws. During the course of the 15th century, the Crown of England would assert a claim to the Crown of France, thereby also releasing the King of England from being vassal of the King of France. In 1534, King Henry VIII, at first having been a strong defender of Roman Catholicism in the face of the Reformation, separated from the Roman Church after failing to secure a divorce from the Pope. His response was to place the King of England as "the only Supreme Head in Earth of the Church of England", thereby removing the authority of the Pope from the affairs of the English Church. Ireland, which had been held by the King of England as Lord of Ireland, but which strictly speaking had been a feudal possession of the Pope since the Norman invasion, was declared a separate kingdom in personal union with England.

Meanwhile, Scotland had remained an independent Kingdom. In 1603, that changed when the King of Scotland inherited the Crown of England and consequently the Crown of Ireland too. The subsequent 17th century was one of political upheaval, religious division and war. English colonialism in Ireland of the 16th century was extended by large-scale Scottish and English colonies in Ulster. Religious division heightened, and the king of England came into conflict with parliament over his tolerance of Catholicism. The resulting English Civil War or War of the Three Kingdoms led to a revolutionary republic in England. Ireland, largely Catholic, was mainly loyal to the king, but by military conquest was subsumed into the new republic. Following defeat of the parliament's army, large-scale land redistributions from loyalist Irish nobility to English commoners in the service of the parliamentary army created a new Ascendancy class, which obliterated the remnants of Old English (Hiberno-Norman) and Gaelic Irish nobility in Ireland. The new ruling class was Protestant and English, whilst the populace was largely Catholic and Irish. This theme would influence Irish politics for centuries to come. When the monarchy was restored in England, the king found it politically impossible to restore the lands of former landowners in Ireland. The "Glorious Revolution" of 1688 repeated similar themes: a Catholic king pushing for religious tolerance in opposition to a Protestant parliament in England. The king's army was defeated at the Battle of the Boyne and at the militarily crucial Battle of Aughrim in Ireland. Resistance held out, eventually forcing the guarantee of religious tolerance in the Treaty of Limerick. However, the terms were never honoured, and a new monarchy was installed.

The Kingdoms of England and Scotland were unified in 1707, creating the Kingdom of Great Britain. Following an attempted republican revolution in Ireland in 1798, the Kingdoms of Ireland and Great Britain were unified in 1801, creating the United Kingdom. The Isle of Man and the Channel Islands remained outside of the United Kingdom, but with their ultimate good governance being the responsibility of the British Crown (effectively the British government). Although the colonies of North America that would become the United States of America were lost by the start of the 19th century, the British Empire expanded rapidly elsewhere. A century later, it would cover one-third of the globe. Poverty in the United Kingdom remained desperate, however, and industrialisation in England led to terrible conditions for the working classes. Mass migrations following the Irish Famine and Highland Clearances resulted in the distribution of the islands' population and culture throughout the world and a rapid de-population of Ireland in the second half of the 19th century. Most of Ireland seceded from the United Kingdom after the Irish War of Independence and the subsequent Anglo-Irish Treaty (1919–1922), with the six counties that formed Northern Ireland remaining as an autonomous region of the UK.

== Politics ==
An Euler diagram of the subdivisions of the British Isles. Geographical subdivisions are in green, political subdivisions in blue.

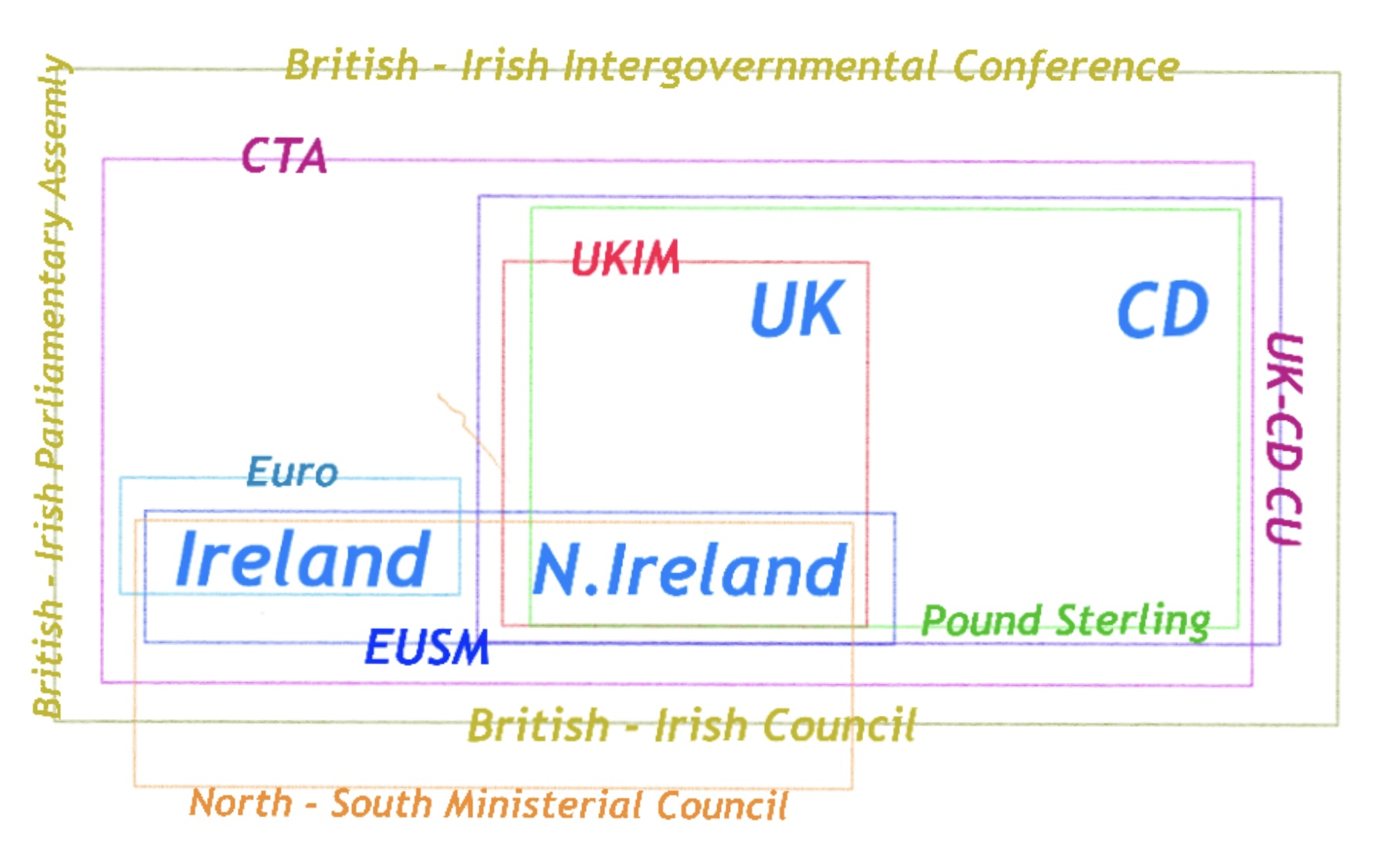
Relations within the British Isles include both political and economic arrangements (Note: Examples of relations within the British Isles include: British–Irish Intergovernmental Conference, British–Irish Parliamentary Assembly, British Irish Council, North/South Ministerial Council, Common Travel Area, United Kingdom - Crown Dependencies Customs Union, European Single Market, Euro, EU Customs Union, UK Internal Market, Pound Sterling)

There are two sovereign states in the British Isles: Ireland and the United Kingdom of Great Britain and Northern Ireland. Ireland, sometimes called the Republic of Ireland, governs five-sixths of the island of Ireland, with the remainder of the island forming Northern Ireland. Northern Ireland is a part of the United Kingdom of Great Britain and Northern Ireland, usually shortened to simply "the United Kingdom", which governs the remainder of the archipelago with the exception of the Isle of Man and the Channel Islands. The Isle of Man and the two Bailiwicks of the Channel Islands, Jersey and Guernsey, are known as the Crown Dependencies. They exercise constitutional rights of self-government and judicial independence; responsibility for international representation rests largely with the UK (in consultation with the respective governments); and responsibility for defence is reserved by the UK. The United Kingdom is made up of four constituent parts: England, Scotland and Wales, forming Great Britain, and Northern Ireland in the north-east of the island of Ireland. Of these, Scotland, Wales and Northern Ireland have devolved governments, meaning that each has its own parliament or assembly and is self-governing with respect to certain matters set down by law. For judicial purposes, Scotland, Northern Ireland and England and Wales (the latter being one entity) form separate legal jurisdictions, with there being no single law for the UK as a whole.

Ireland, the United Kingdom and the three Crown dependencies are all parliamentary democracies, with their own separate parliaments. All parts of the United Kingdom return Members of Parliament (MPs) to parliament in London. In addition to this, voters in Scotland, Wales and Northern Ireland return members to a devolved parliament in Edinburgh and in Cardiff and an assembly in Belfast. Governance in the norm is by majority rule; however, Northern Ireland uses a system of power sharing whereby unionists and nationalists share executive posts proportionately and where the assent of both groups is required for the Northern Ireland Assembly to make certain decisions. (In the context of Northern Ireland, unionists are those who want Northern Ireland to remain a part of the United Kingdom and nationalists are those who want Northern Ireland to join with the rest of Ireland.) The British monarch is the head of state of the United Kingdom, while in the Republic of Ireland the head of state is the President of Ireland.

Ireland is the only part of the isles that is a member state of the European Union (EU). The UK was a member between 1 January 1973 and 31 January 2020, but the Isle of Man and the Channel Islands were not. Since the partition of Ireland, an informal free-travel area has existed across the island of Ireland. This area required formal recognition in 1997 during the course of negotiations for the Amsterdam Treaty of the European Union, and (together with the Crown dependencies) is now known as the Common Travel Area. As such, Ireland is not part of the Schengen Area, which allows passport-free travel between most EU member states, and is the only member state with an opt-out from the obligation to join the Schengen Zone.

Reciprocal arrangements allow British and Irish citizens specific voting rights in the two states. In Ireland, British citizens can vote in General and local elections, but not in European Parliament elections, constitutional referendums or presidential elections (for which there is no comparable franchise in the United Kingdom). In the United Kingdom, Irish and Commonwealth citizens can vote in every election for which British citizens are eligible. In the Crown dependencies, any resident can vote in general elections, but in Jersey and the Isle of Man only British citizens can run for office. These pre-date European Union law, and in both jurisdictions go further than what was required by European Union law (EU citizens may only vote in local elections in both states and European elections in Ireland). In 2008, a UK Ministry of Justice report investigating how to strengthen the British sense of citizenship proposed to end this arrangement, arguing that "the right to vote is one of the hallmarks of the political status of citizens; it is not a means of expressing closeness between countries".

In addition, some civil bodies are organised throughout the islands as a whole. The Royal National Lifeboat Institution (RNLI), a charity that operates a lifeboat service, is organised throughout the islands as a whole, covering the waters of the United Kingdom, Ireland, the Isle of Man, and the Channel Islands.

The Northern Ireland peace process has led to a number of unusual arrangements between the Republic of Ireland, Northern Ireland and the United Kingdom. For example, citizens of Northern Ireland are entitled to the choice of Irish or British citizenship or both, and the Governments of Ireland and the United Kingdom consult on matters not devolved to the Northern Ireland Executive. The Northern Ireland Executive and the Government of Ireland also meet as the North/South Ministerial Council to develop policies common across the island of Ireland. These arrangements were made following the 1998 Good Friday Agreement.

=== British–Irish Council ===
Another body established under the Good Friday Agreement, the British–Irish Council, is made up of all of the states and territories of the British Isles. The British–Irish Parliamentary Assembly (Irish: Tionól Pharlaiminteach na Breataine agus na hÉireann) predates the British–Irish Council and was established in 1990. Originally it comprised 25 members of the Oireachtas, the Irish parliament, and 25 members of the parliament of the United Kingdom, with the purpose of building mutual understanding between members of both legislatures. Since then the role and scope of the body has been expanded to include representatives from the Scottish Parliament, the Senedd (Welsh Parliament), the Northern Ireland Assembly, the States of Jersey, the States of Guernsey and the High Court of Tynwald (Isle of Man).

The Council does not have executive powers but meets biannually to discuss issues of mutual importance. Similarly, the Parliamentary Assembly has no legislative powers but investigates and collects witness evidence from the public on matters of mutual concern to its members. Reports on its findings are presented to the Governments of Ireland and the United Kingdom. During the February 2008 meeting of the British–Irish Council, it was agreed to set up a standing secretariat that would serve as a permanent 'civil service' for the Council. Leading on from developments in the British–Irish Council, the chair of the British–Irish Inter-Parliamentary Assembly, Niall Blaney, has suggested that the body should shadow the British–Irish Council's work.

== Culture ==
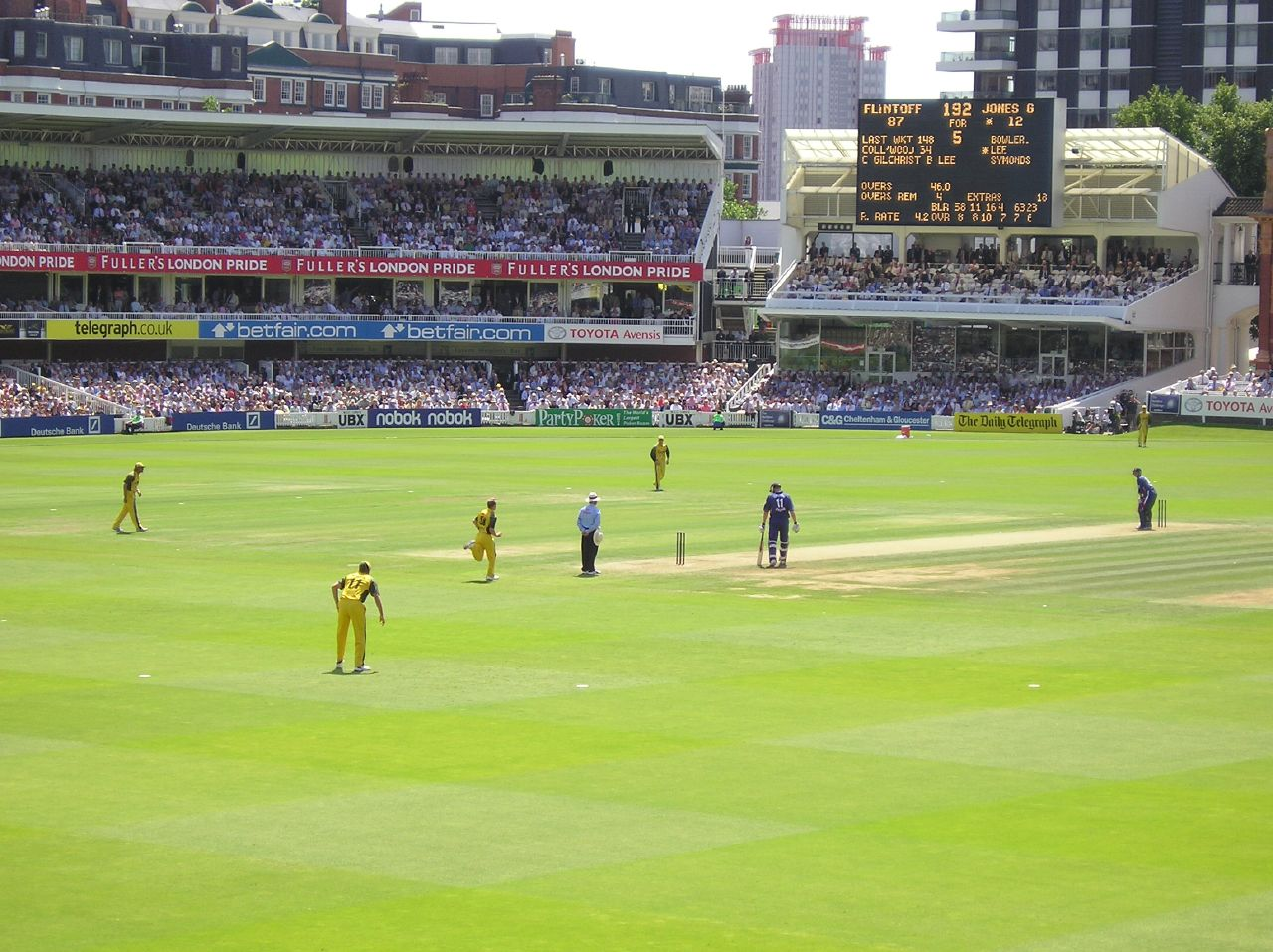
One Day Cricket International at Lord's; England v Australia 10 July 2005

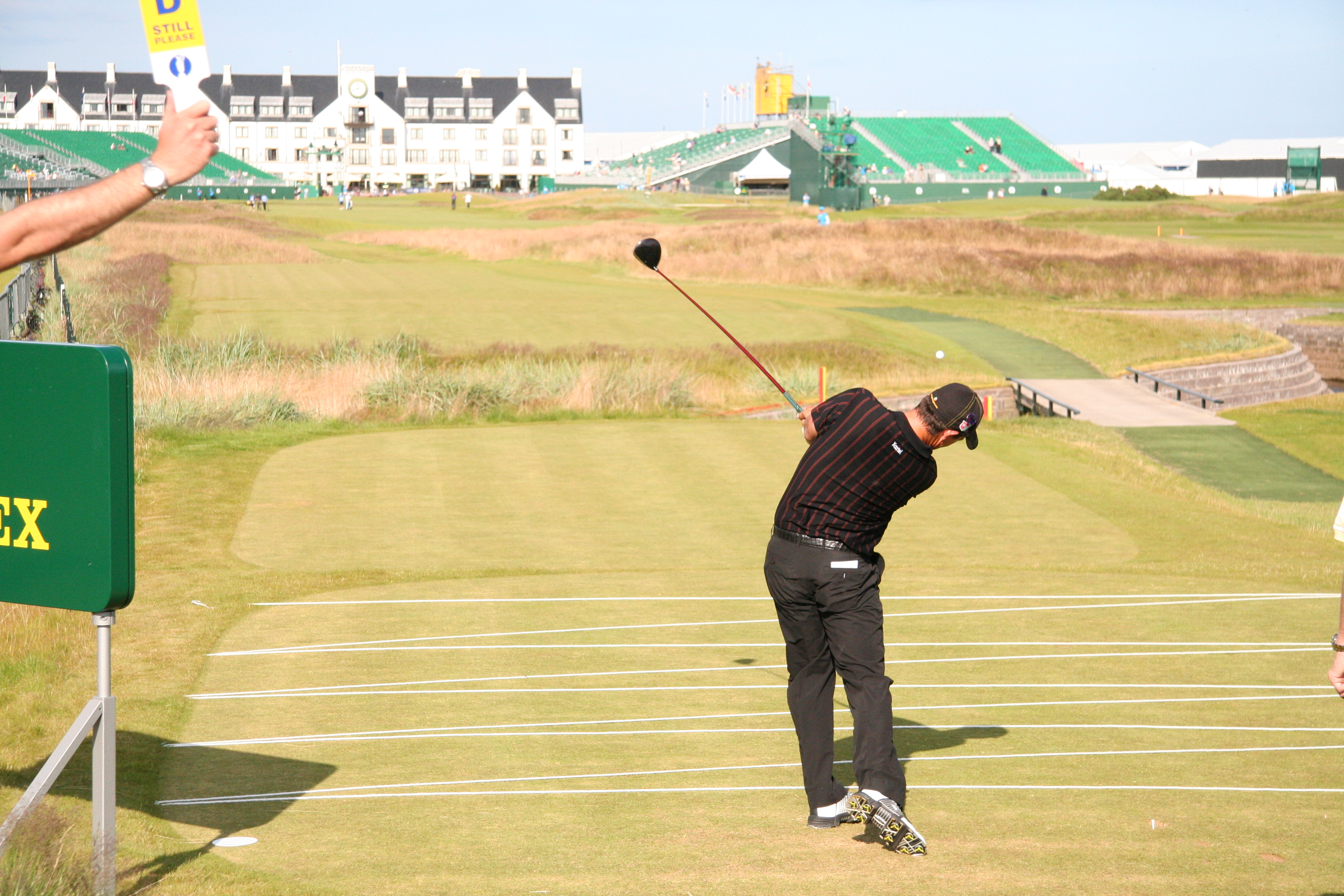
Pádraig Harrington teeing off at the Open Championship (golf) in 2007

The United Kingdom and Ireland have separate media, although British television, newspapers and magazines are widely available in Ireland, giving people in Ireland a high level of familiarity with the culture of the United Kingdom. Irish newspapers are also available in the UK, and Irish state and private television are widely available in Northern Ireland. Certain reality TV shows have embraced the whole of the islands, for example The X Factor, seasons 3, 4 and 7 of which featured auditions in Dublin and were open to Irish voters, whilst the show previously known as Britain's Next Top Model became Britain and Ireland's Next Top Model in 2011. A few cultural events are organised for the island group as a whole. For example, the Costa Book Awards are awarded to authors resident in the UK or Ireland. The Mercury Music Prize is handed out every year to the best album from a British or Irish musician or group.

Many globally popular sports had their modern rules codified in the British Isles, including golf, association football, cricket, rugby, snooker and darts, as well as many minor sports such as croquet, bowls, pitch and putt, water polo and handball. A number of sports are popular throughout the British Isles, the most prominent of which is association football. While this is organised separately in different national associations, leagues and national teams, even within the UK, it is a common passion in all parts of the islands. Rugby union is also widely enjoyed across the islands with four national teams from England, Ireland, Scotland and Wales. The British and Irish Lions is a team chosen from each national team and undertakes tours of the Southern Hemisphere rugby-playing nations every four years. Ireland plays as a united team, represented by players from both Northern Ireland and the Republic. These national rugby teams play each other each year for the Triple Crown as part of the Six Nations Championship. Also, since 2001, the professional club teams of Ireland, Scotland, Wales, Italy and South Africa compete against each other in the United Rugby Championship. Gaelic Football and Hurling are the two most common sports in the Republic of Ireland and among the top sports in Northern Ireland and have their roots in ancient Gaelic culture

The Ryder Cup in golf was originally played between a United States team and a team representing Great Britain and Ireland. From 1979 onwards, this was expanded to include the whole of Europe.

== Transport ==
London Heathrow Airport is Europe's busiest airport in terms of passenger traffic, and the Dublin-London route is the busiest air route in Europe collectively, the busiest route out of Heathrow, and among the top-20 busiest international air routes in the world. The English Channel and the southern North Sea are the busiest seaways in the world. The Channel Tunnel, opened in 1994, links Great Britain to France and is the second-longest rail tunnel in the world.

The idea of building a tunnel under the Irish Sea has been raised since 1895, when it was first investigated. Several potential Irish Sea tunnel projects have been proposed, most recently the Tusker Tunnel between the ports of Rosslare and Fishguard proposed by The Institute of Engineers of Ireland in 2004. A rail tunnel was proposed in 1997 on a different route, between Dublin and Holyhead, by British engineering firm Symonds. Either tunnel, at 50 mi (80 km), would be by far the longest in the world, and would cost an estimated £15 billion (€20 billion). A proposal in 2007, estimated the cost of building a bridge from County Antrim in Northern Ireland to Galloway in Scotland at £3.5bn (€5bn).

== See also ==
- British Islands
- Extreme points of the British Isles
- List of islands of the British Isles
- Proposed British Isles fixed sea link connections
