= Football in the United Kingdom =

Football is the most popular sport in the United Kingdom. Football is organised on a separate basis in each of the four constituent countries, England, Scotland, Wales, and Northern Ireland, that make up the United Kingdom (UK), with each having a national football association responsible for the overall management of football within their respective country. There is no United Kingdom national football team. Football has been the most popular sport in the UK since the 1860s. Rugby union, rugby league and cricket are other popular sports.

This article provides some comparisons concerning football in the home nations. For details about football across the United Kingdom and its territories, refer to the table below:

(United Kingdom)		Men's football	Women's football
Home nations	(England)	Football in England	Women's football in England
Home nations	(Scotland)	Football in Scotland	Women's football in Scotland
Home nations	(Wales)	Football in Wales	Women's football in Wales
Home nations	(Northern Ireland)	Football in Northern Ireland	Women's football in Northern Ireland
Crown dependencies	(Isle of Man)	Football in the Isle of Man	
Crown dependencies	(Jersey)	Football in Jersey	
Crown dependencies	(Guernsey)	Football in Guernsey	
British Overseas Territories (Note: Only territories with articles are shown.)	(Anguilla)	Football in Anguilla	
British Overseas Territories	(Bermuda)	Football in Bermuda	
British Overseas Territories	(British Virgin Islands)	Football in the British Virgin Islands	
British Overseas Territories	(Cayman Islands)	Football in the Cayman Islands	
British Overseas Territories	(Gibraltar)	Football in Gibraltar	
British Overseas Territories	(Montserrat)	Football in Montserrat	
British Overseas Territories	(Turks and Caicos Islands)	Football in the Turks and Caicos Islands	

== Football associations ==
Each of the countries of the United Kingdom, sometimes referred to as the home nations, has a national football association responsible for the overall management of football within their respective nation: The Football Association, (FA) is responsible for England and the Crown Dependencies and was founded in 1863, The Scottish Football Association (SFA) was founded in 1873 followed by the Football Association of Wales (FAW) in 1876 and Irish Football Association (IFA) in 1880. They are the world's four oldest national football associations and play an important part in football worldwide as they take up four of the eight seats on the International Football Association Board (IFAB), which determines the Laws of the Game, the other four seats being occupied by FIFA.

== Men's International football ==
The United Kingdom plays its international football as separate Home Nations teams of England, Scotland, Wales and Northern Ireland. The only exception to this is during the Summer Olympics where the United Kingdom is represented by Great Britain Olympic football team, which despite the name includes Northern Ireland. Some people, such as politician Tony Banks, have argued for the UK having just one team to represent it for all competitions but all four football associations are very much against such an idea.

There are sometimes issues about which team players are eligible for (as all the players representing those teams have British passports), but a player is generally eligible for whichever nation he, his parents or grandparents were born in (in the case of these being different nations, then he can choose). This has been the case with some players such as Aiden McGeady and Jack Collison who have chosen to play for the country of their parental heritage rather than the country of their birth. Players from crown dependencies (i.e. the Isle of Man and the Channel Islands), which are technically not in the UK, are eligible for all four teams (e.g. Matt Le Tissier and Graeme Le Saux, both of whom opted for England), as were British citizens born outside the UK or its possessions – Eric Young (born in Singapore) and Pat van den Hauwe (born in Belgium) had previously opted for Wales under the same rule and Maik Taylor (born in Germany to a British father) used it to represent Northern Ireland – but residency criteria now also apply.

=== United Kingdom Olympic history ===
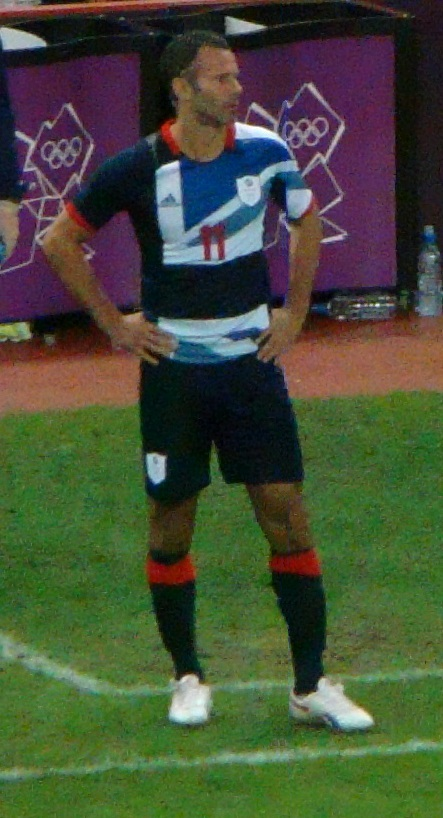
Wales's Ryan Giggs is the most recent player to captain the Olympic team.

In the early years, the Olympic football competition was contested between amateur sides, and the British Olympic Committee agreed to let the England amateur team represent the entire UK. More recently the Olympic competition has been played by under-23s teams and Great Britain has not normally been represented. This is because qualification is based on the UEFA Under-21 championship, which means it is impossible for Great Britain to qualify as the national teams participate separately in that competition. There have been instances where an individual nation would have qualified, but a lower ranked nation has taken its place instead.

An exception to this was the 2012 Summer Olympics, which were hosted to London. This meant that Great Britain qualified, by right of being host nation, for the football tournaments. While the English Football Association favoured the idea of a unified team for 2012, the other three federations opposed the concept. The Scottish Football Association was particularly strident in this view, fearing that a single UK team would jeopardise the independent status all four Home Nations enjoy. FIFA set a deadline of 1 June 2009 for the Home Nations to come to an agreement, which resulted in the four associations sending a letter to FIFA stating that while the Scottish, Welsh, and Northern Ireland associations still opposed the concept of a unified Great Britain team and would not participate in such a team, they would not prevent England from fielding a team under that banner. FIFA president Sepp Blatter officially approved the deal within days. However, even though the Welsh had said they would not participate in such a team, Welsh players such as Gareth Bale expressed an interest in playing for a unified team. The Football Association chose to disregard the agreement and selected five Welsh players for the men's team. The future of Great Britain Olympic teams is uncertain as there is no mechanism for them to qualify for forthcoming tournaments. However, the presence of a unified women's team at Tokyo 2020 gave hope for the future of the men's team.

=== International matches between the home nations ===
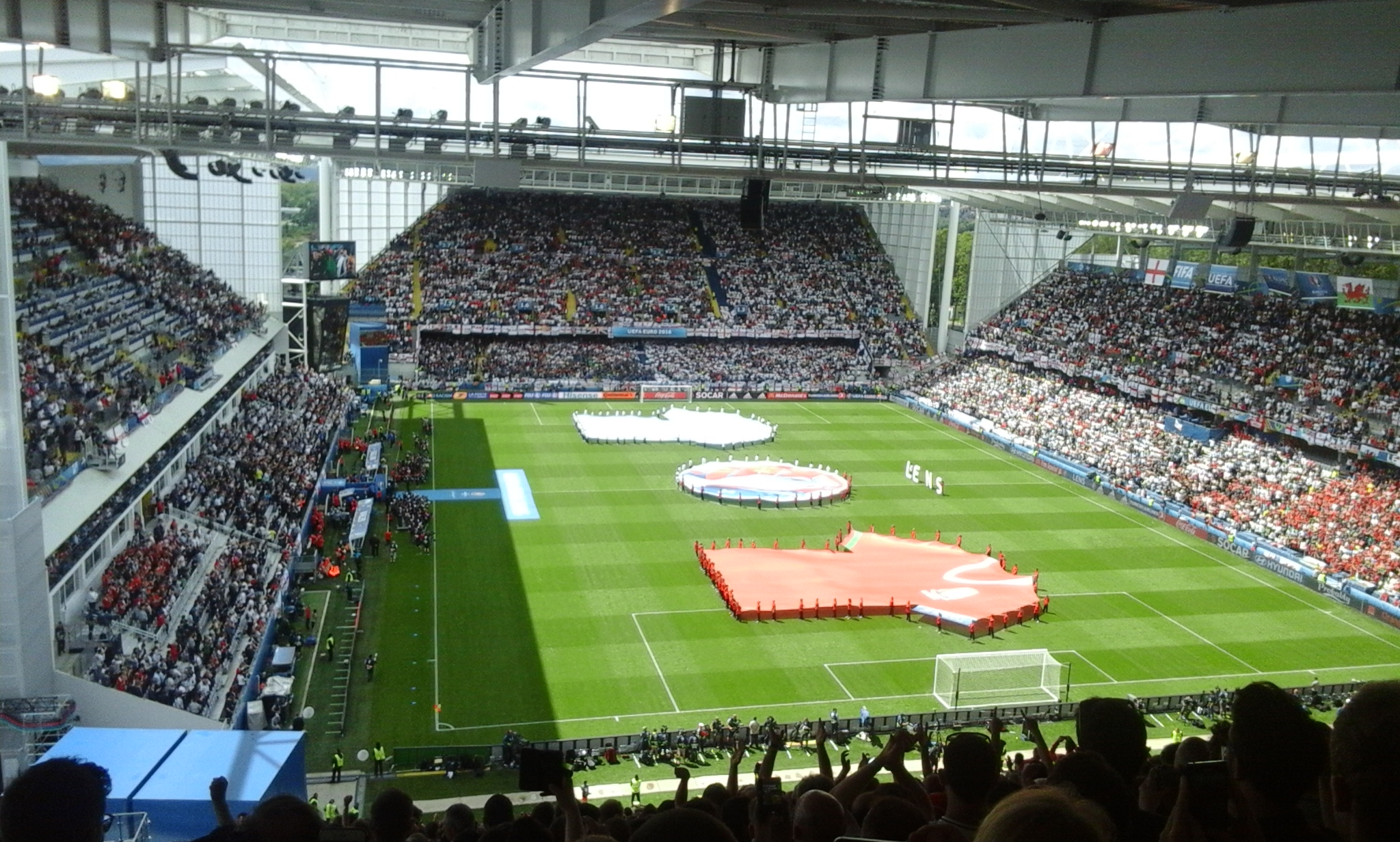
England and Wales line up at Euro 2016

The UK teams have played each other more times than any other footballing nations in the world. The world's first international football match was played between Scotland and England in Glasgow in 1872 (a 0–0 draw). From then on, all four teams started playing regular friendlies against each other. In 1883 a formal competition between the UK's teams, the British Home Championship, was introduced, guaranteeing that each team would play the other three at least once a season. The Championship was discontinued in 1984, partly due to problems of crowd trouble, and partly due to the desire of England (and to a lesser extent Scotland) to contest international fixtures against larger and more powerful nations.

While the British Home Championship was being played, the UK teams were also drawn together on a number of occasions during qualification competitions for the FIFA World Cup and UEFA European Championships. Early tournaments simply used the British Championship as a qualifying group, but during qualification for the 1974 World Cup, England and Wales were drawn in the same group. Subsequent to this, three more qualification tournaments saw UK teams drawn together while the British Championship was being played. Since the end of the British Home Championship, the teams have played each other mainly when drawn together in international competitions such as the European Championship or the World Cup, with occasional friendly fixtures.

In 2011, Vauxhall signed sponsorship deals with the FA, SFA, FAW and IFA, and stated their desire to see the four home nations play each other in a version of the British Home Championship again.

Since the end of the British Home Championship, there have been many calls for it to be restored to the schedule. One argument is that it would replace so-called "meaningless friendlies" with a proper tournament that would raise the interest of both the players and fans. However there has been a lack of enthusiasm for such a proposal, particularly from England; as time has passed, The Football Association has grown in commercial power beyond that of the other three home associations, so that it could be claimed that friendlies against major footballing nations from Europe and South America are worth more than playing the home nations.

In December 2006, Lawrie Sanchez suggested that a tournament featuring the three home Celtic nations plus the Republic of Ireland could be organised. He stated that the IFA hierarchy were supportive of a new Home Championship, while the SFA expressed guarded interest. This was further elaborated in February 2007 when Alex McLeish, the newly appointed manager of Scotland, expressed interest in playing against the home nations and the Republic of Ireland. Accepting that England would probably not be interested in a new Home Championship, he said, "If the English FA are thinking about opposition for the new Wembley, I hope we're in their thoughts." Both England and Wales were less enthusiastic, stating that with the number of friendlies played each year it would "be difficult to see how the Home Nations would fit in".

On 18 September 2008, it was announced that a tournament featuring the Republic of Ireland, Scotland, Wales and Northern Ireland – the Nations Cup – would be played in 2011. The attendances for the matches, particularly those not involving the Republic or Scotland, were low and the tournament has not been repeated.

=== Coefficients of British national teams ===
==== FIFA ====
As of October 2020

Team	Points	Rank
England	1669	4/210
Wales	1550	20/210
Northern Ireland	1458	41/210
Scotland	1446	45/210
Bermuda	983	168/210
Montserrat	921	184/210
Cayman Islands	897	193/210
Gibraltar	890	195/210
Turks and Caicos Islands	862	203/210
British Virgin Islands	842	208/210
Anguilla	821	209/210

==== UEFA ====
As of 2017

Team	Coeff	Rank
England	36,231	6/55
Wales	29,269	14/55
Northern Ireland	27,127	21/55
Scotland	25,662	27/55
Gibraltar	7,550	55/55

==== CONCACAF ====
As of 2018

Team	Points	Rank
Bermuda	924	21/40
Cayman Islands	543	33/40
Turks and Caicos Islands	483	34/40
Montserrat	435	35/40
British Virgin Islands	261	39/40
Anguilla	261	40/40

=== National football teams of the Crown dependencies and overseas territories ===
Although technically not part of the UK, football in the crown dependencies is governed by The Football Association and represented by the England national football team. At the same time the crown dependencies also have their own non-FIFA affiliated teams:

- Guernsey national football team
  - Alderney national football team
  - Sark national football team
- Isle of Man national football team
- Jersey national football team

Overseas territories are not technically part of the UK either, and they have their own teams. Some of the overseas territories have full or associate membership in the corresponding regional federations:

- Ascension Island national football team
- Anguilla national football team
- Bermuda national football team
- British Virgin Islands national football team
- Cayman Islands national football team
- Falkland Islands national football team
- Gibraltar national football team
- Montserrat national football team
- Pitcairn Islands national football team
- Saint Helena national football team
- Turks and Caicos Islands national football team

== Women's International Football ==
=== History ===
The history of women's club football in the United Kingdom dates back to the early 20th century. Despite facing numerous obstacles and challenges, the sport has seen an increase in popularity and success over the years, becoming an integral part of the United Kingdom's sports culture.

The first recorded women's football match in the United Kingdom was played in 1895, between two teams of factory workers. However, it wasn't until the early 1900s that the sport began to gain recognition and popularity. The Women's Football Association (WFA) Cup Final, a major tournament in the country, was first held in 1971, marking a significant milestone in the growth of women's football. By the 1980s, the sport had become increasingly popular, with thousands of players and fans participating and supporting the teams. Despite the progress made in the early days of women's football in the United Kingdom, the sport faced numerous obstacles, including discrimination and a lack of funding. Early on, women's teams were not permitted to play on the same fields as men's teams and were often relegated to playing on makeshift pitches or public parks. Furthermore, women's teams were not provided with the same resources and support as men's teams, making it difficult for them to reach a competitive level.

Despite facing discrimination and lack of funding in the past, women's football in the United Kingdom has seen a significant growth in popularity and success over the years. Today, the sport boasts a large following with over 150,000 registered female players and has gained significant media coverage and sponsorship. The England women's national team has also made a mark on the international stage, with notable achievements such as winning the Women's Euros in 1984 and reaching the semi-final of the Women's World Cup in 2019. This showcases the progress and dedication towards the development of women's football in the United Kingdom.

Similar to in men's football, international women's football is played in separate Home Nations teams of England, Scotland, Wales and Northern Ireland. Again, the only exception to this is during the Summer Olympics where the United Kingdom is represented by Great Britain women's Olympic football team, which again includes Northern Ireland.

=== United Kingdom Olympic history ===
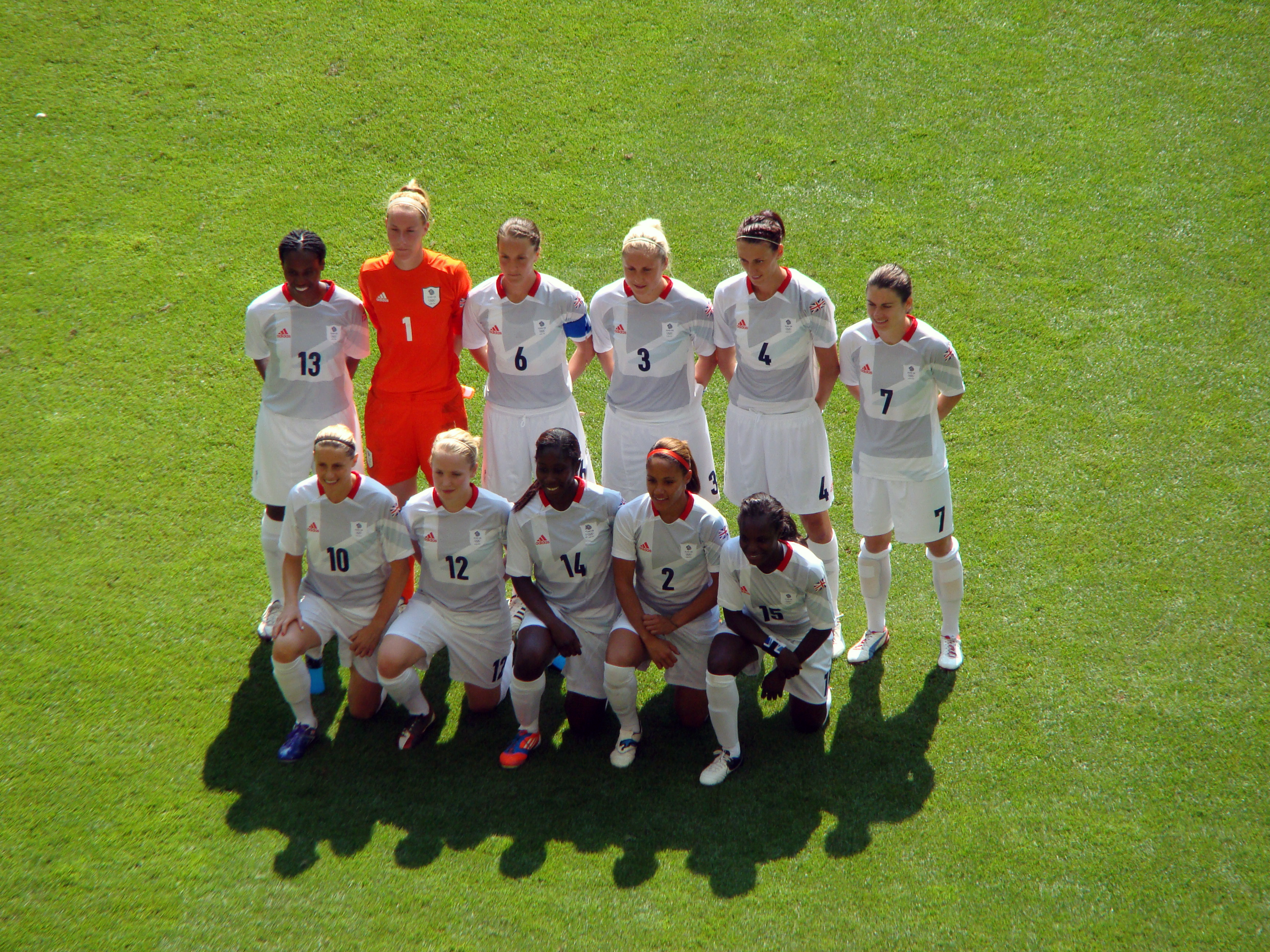
Great Britain Women at the 2012 Summer Olympics

Women's football began in the Summer Olympics at Atlanta 1996. Unlike men's football, women's football at the Olympics is played at full senior level. The Great Britain Women have historically not competed at football in the Summer Olympics for the same reason as the men's team.

Again, an exception to this was the 2012 Summer Olympics, which Great Britain were hosts. This meant that Great Britain qualified, by right of being host nation, for the football tournaments. The team was approved to play in the tournament via the same process as the men's with England being granted permission to play under the name "Great Britain". Despite this, two Scottish players for the women's team, which saw Great Britain reach the quarter-finals. The success at London 2012 gave hope for a unified team to complete at Rio 2016 but no agreement between the four football associations could be reached. However it was agreed that a women's team could compete in the Tokyo 2020 edition of the Olympics.

Coefficients of British national teams

==== FIFA ====
As of August 2022

Team	Points	Rank
England	2039.44	4/159
Scotland	1739.83	23/159
Wales	1739.83	30/159
Northern Ireland	1511.13	50/159
Bermuda	1007.55	148/159

==== UEFA ====
As of 2017

Team	Coeff	Rank
England	39,880	3/49
Scotland	33,632	11/49
Wales	25,807	18/49
Northern Ireland	17,051	30/49

== Men's club football ==
=== League systems ===
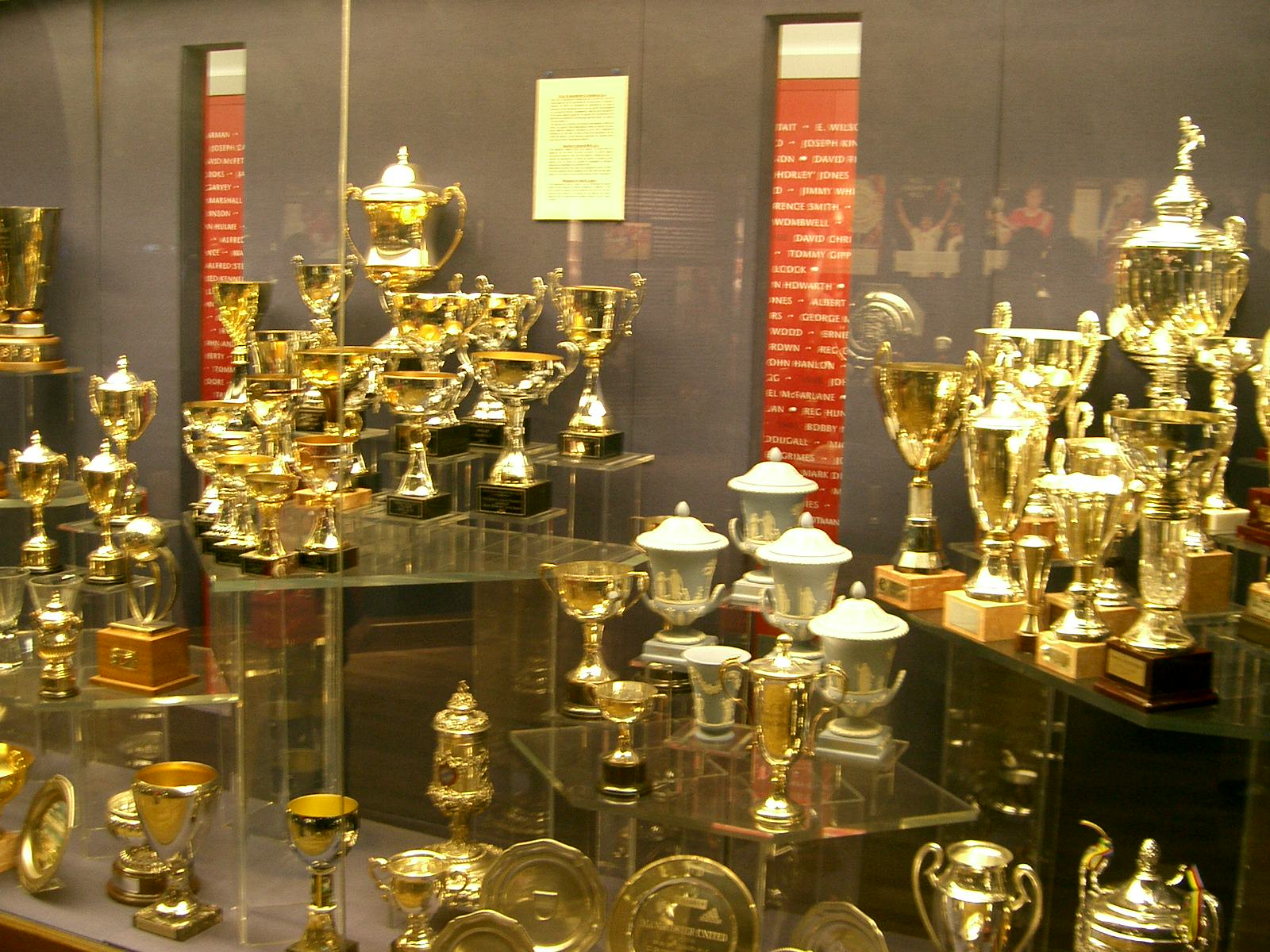
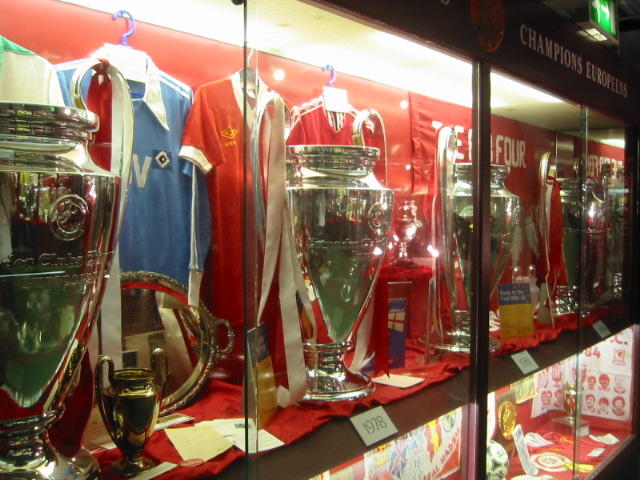
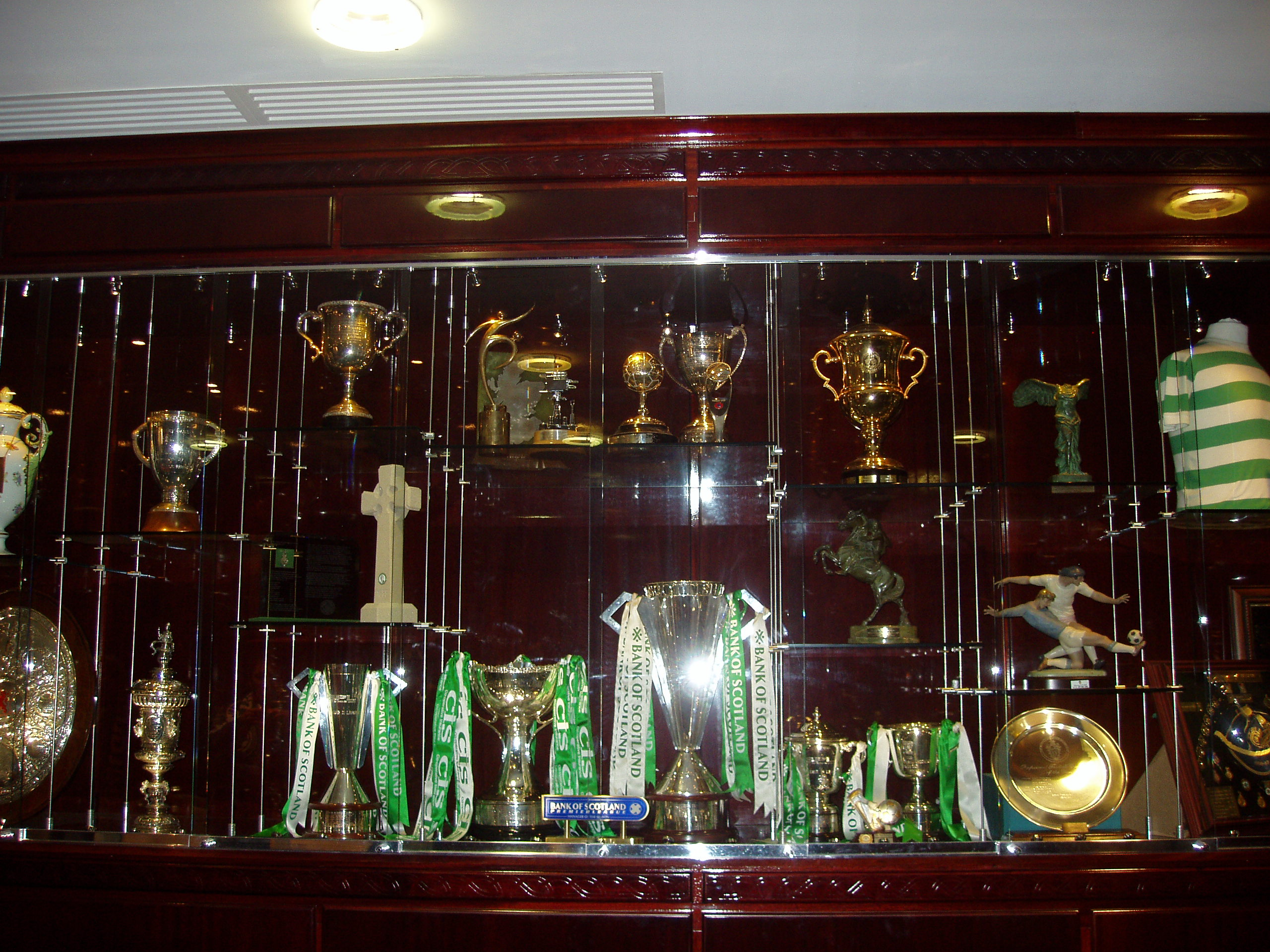
Manchester United, Liverpool, and Celtic are some of the UK's most successful clubs. Here is a handful of trophies won by the three sides.

There are separate club football league systems for England, Scotland, Wales and Northern Ireland though some clubs play outside their country's respective system for mainly logistical reasons. Wales did not get a national league until 1992 (though regional leagues existed prior to that), which explains why the top four Welsh clubs play in what is now regarded as the English system.

The English football league system includes hundreds of interlinked leagues, consisting of thousands of divisions. The Premier League is at the top, followed by the English Football League and then the National League, where the structure starts to become regional and includes the Northern Premier League, the Southern League, the Isthmian League and many more besides. The Welsh clubs of Cardiff City, Merthyr Town, Newport County, Swansea City and Wrexham play in the English system. Chester, a phoenix club who replaced the original Chester City, play at a stadium that straddles the English-Welsh border, with the club offices in England but the pitch located in Wales.

The Northern Ireland football league system includes the IFA Premiership. One Northern Irish club, Derry City, plays its football outside of the UK in the Republic of Ireland football league system.

The Scottish football league system similarly operates on a pyramid basis. Forty-two clubs compete in the Scottish Professional Football League, which is split into four divisions. Below that there are regional leagues, the Highland Football League, and the Lowland Football League above the East of Scotland Football League, South of Scotland Football League and the West of Scotland Football League. Two English clubs, Berwick Rangers and Tweedmouth Rangers, play in the Scottish system. Outside of the pyramid is one senior league, the North Caledonian Football League, Junior football and amateur football.

The Welsh football league system includes the Cymru Premier (historically the Welsh Premier League) at the top level, the Cymru North and Cymru South at tier two, and a number of more regional leagues below these. Premiership club The New Saints began playing their home matches on the English side of the border in Oswestry in 2007. Historically, the Saints represented the small Welsh village of Llansantffraid-ym-Mechain, but merged with Oswestry Town, which had historically played in the Welsh football system, in 2003.

=== Cup competitions ===
There is a multitude of knockout club cup competitions. Again, these are organised on an English, Scottish, Welsh or Northern Irish basis. Many carry qualification for the UEFA Europa League for the winners.

Each football association runs its own national cup, the FA Cup in England, the Scottish Cup in Scotland, the Welsh Cup in Wales and the Irish Cup in Northern Ireland. Traditionally, these cups have been the most liberal about whom they accept, with many teams from outside that nation (and/or league system) entering. More recently, rules have been tightened, with the competitions only open to teams who play in that nation's football league system.

There are also a number of other cups that have more stringent requirements but carry less prestige, including the Football League Cup in England, the Scottish League Cup in Scotland, Welsh Premier League Cup in Wales and Irish League Cup in Northern Ireland. Some past cups have even crossed UK boundaries, such as the Anglo-Scottish Cup. Another cup competition that crosses the UK's border is the current Champions Cup, which features the champions of the Northern Ireland league and the Republic's.

=== Clubs playing in other countries ===
The nature of the governance of the game in the United Kingdom, with four separate associations, has led to the anomaly of clubs based in one of the four nations playing in competitions run by another. At present, this encompasses the following clubs playing senior football:

England → Scotland - Berwick Rangers, Tweedmouth Rangers
England → Wales - The New Saints
Wales → England - Cardiff City, Merthyr Town, Newport County, Swansea City, Wrexham
Northern Ireland → Ireland - Derry City

Berwick Rangers, The New Saints and Derry City are members of the association that runs the competitions in which they participate. As a consequence, Berwick is classed as a Scottish club, TNS as Welsh and Derry as Irish. This distinction is important especially where European competition is concerned, and both TNS and Derry City have represented Wales and Ireland several times in Europe. However, the Welsh clubs playing in England were more difficult to define, as, although they played almost exclusively in English competitions (with the exception of the Welsh Cup), they were members of the Football Association of Wales, leading to the question of their status. In 2008, Cardiff City reached the final of the FA Cup, which meant they would have been eligible for one of England's places in Europe had they won. The question was only resolved in 2011, when it was decided that Welsh clubs playing in the Premier League and Football League would be subject to governance by The Football Association rather than the FAW. Clubs playing in English competitions below the Football League remain under the purview of the FAW. As of the 2023–24 season, Cardiff City, Swansea City, Newport County and Wrexham play in the Football League.

=== Coefficients of British leagues ===
==== UEFA ====
As of 2020

Team	Coeff	Rank
England	55.500	3/55
Scotland	27.875	14/55
Wales	5.000	47/55
Northern Ireland	4.875	48/55
Gibraltar	4.750	49/55

=== Club meetings in Europe ===
There have been several occasions when clubs from the four home nations have played each other in European competition.

=== Club success in Europe ===
==== European Cup/UEFA Champions League ====
British teams have won the European Cup 16 times in total, behind only Spain. The UK is also the sovereign state with the most clubs to have won it: Liverpool (6), Manchester United (3), Nottingham Forest (2), Chelsea (2), Aston Villa (1) and Manchester City (1) from England (15), plus Celtic (1) from Scotland (1). British clubs have also been runners-up on 13 occasions: Liverpool (4), Manchester United (2), Arsenal (2), Leeds United (1), Chelsea (1), Tottenham Hotspur (1) and Manchester City (1) from England (12), plus Celtic (1) from Scotland (1).

Celtic became the first British club to win the Cup in 1967, beating Italian side Inter, who had won two of the previous three finals, 2–1 in Lisbon. The first English team to win the competition was Manchester United, who defeated two-time winners Benfica of Portugal 4–1 at Wembley the following year, in 1968. English teams enjoyed the most successful period when they won the European Cup six years in a row from 1977 to 1982.

As a result of the Heysel Stadium disaster of 1985, English clubs (though not those of other British associations) were banned from European competition. The ban was lifted in 1990 for all teams except Liverpool (which had taken part in the Heysel event). Liverpool returned to European competition the following year.

England is home to the Premier League, which has become one of the best and richest leagues in the world, attracting viewers from various countries around the globe. The Champions League final in 2010 was the first final in six years that did not feature an English team. In 2007, 2008 and 2009, three out of the four teams in the semi-finals were English. In May 2008 Manchester United and Chelsea played in the first ever all-English final, which Manchester United won on penalties.

==== Inter-Cities Fairs Cup/UEFA Cup/UEFA Europa League ====
British clubs have also been successful in the Inter-Cities Fairs Cup and the UEFA Cup/Europa League, with a total of 15 wins in the two competitions (all English), together with 17 runners-up placings (13 English and four Scottish).

==== UEFA Conference League ====
The UEFA Conference League has been won three times by British clubs (all English).

==== European Cup Winners' Cup ====
The now defunct European Cup Winners' Cup has been won ten times by British clubs (eight English and two Scottish), with British clubs being runners-up seven times (five English and two Scottish).

=== Popularity ===
Many Premier League clubs have a large international fanbase. Five of the top 10 most popular sports clubs on social media in the world, as of 7 February 2024, are from the United Kingdom:

#	Football club	Country	Followers
1	Real Madrid	Spain	360.5 million
2	FC Barcelona	Spain	318.8 million
3	Manchester United	United Kingdom	207 million
4	Paris Saint-Germain	France	163 million
5	Juventus	Italy	147.4 million
6	Manchester City	United Kingdom	139.7 million
7	Chelsea FC	United Kingdom	136.7 million
8	Liverpool FC	United Kingdom	131.6 million
9	Bayern Munich	Germany	126.5 million
10	Arsenal FC	United Kingdom	99.2 million

== Women's club football ==
=== League systems ===
Women's club football is also played in separate league systems for England, Scotland, Wales and Northern Ireland.

The English women's football league system also includes many interlinked leagues, consisting of thousands of divisions. The FA Women's Super League is at the top, with the FA Women's Championship second, and then the FA Women's National League encompassing the third and fourth tier. Below this are various regional leagues which feed into the upper tiers.

The Northern Irish women's football league system is headed by the IFA Women's Premiership.

The Scottish women's football league system similarly operates on a pyramid basis with the SWPL 1 and SWPL 2 heading the pyramid.

The Welsh women's football league system includes the Welsh Premier Women's Football League which was founded in 2009, in addition to various regional leagues.

=== Cup competitions ===
Similar to in men's football, each FA runs their own women's cup with the Women's FA Cup, Scottish Women's Cup, FAW Women's Cup, and IFA Women's Challenge Cup existing as national cups in the respective countries. The FA Women's League Cup also exists in England, and the Scottish Women's Premier League Cup, Scottish Women's Football League First Division Cup, Scottish Women's Football League Second Division Cup existing on Scotland.

=== The Women's Super League (WSL) ===
The Women's Super League (WSL) is the top professional league for women's football in England. It was founded in 2011, and since then, it has been at the forefront of the growth and development of women's football in the country. The Women's Super League (WSL) in England is a professional league that has seen significant growth and success in recent years. The league has been able to attract increased media coverage, sponsorship and has adopted a summer calendar to align with men's leagues, leading to an increase in attendance and viewership. This has resulted in the league gaining a dedicated fanbase.

The league provides a platform for the development of young talent with several teams having successful academies and youth systems, which ensures the continued success of the league. The WSL has also had a positive impact on the international stage, with several players from the league representing the England Women's national team, which has become one of the top teams in the world. The WSL is an important part of the growth and development of women's football in the United Kingdom, and its strong teams, dedicated fanbase, and commitment to young talent, makes it a leading force in the professionalisation of women's football in the country.

=== Coefficients of British leagues ===
==== UEFA ====
As of 2020

Team	Coeff	Rank
England	88.176	2/50
Scotland	22.000	15/50
Wales	3.500	40/50
Northern Ireland	2.000	43/50

== Stadiums ==
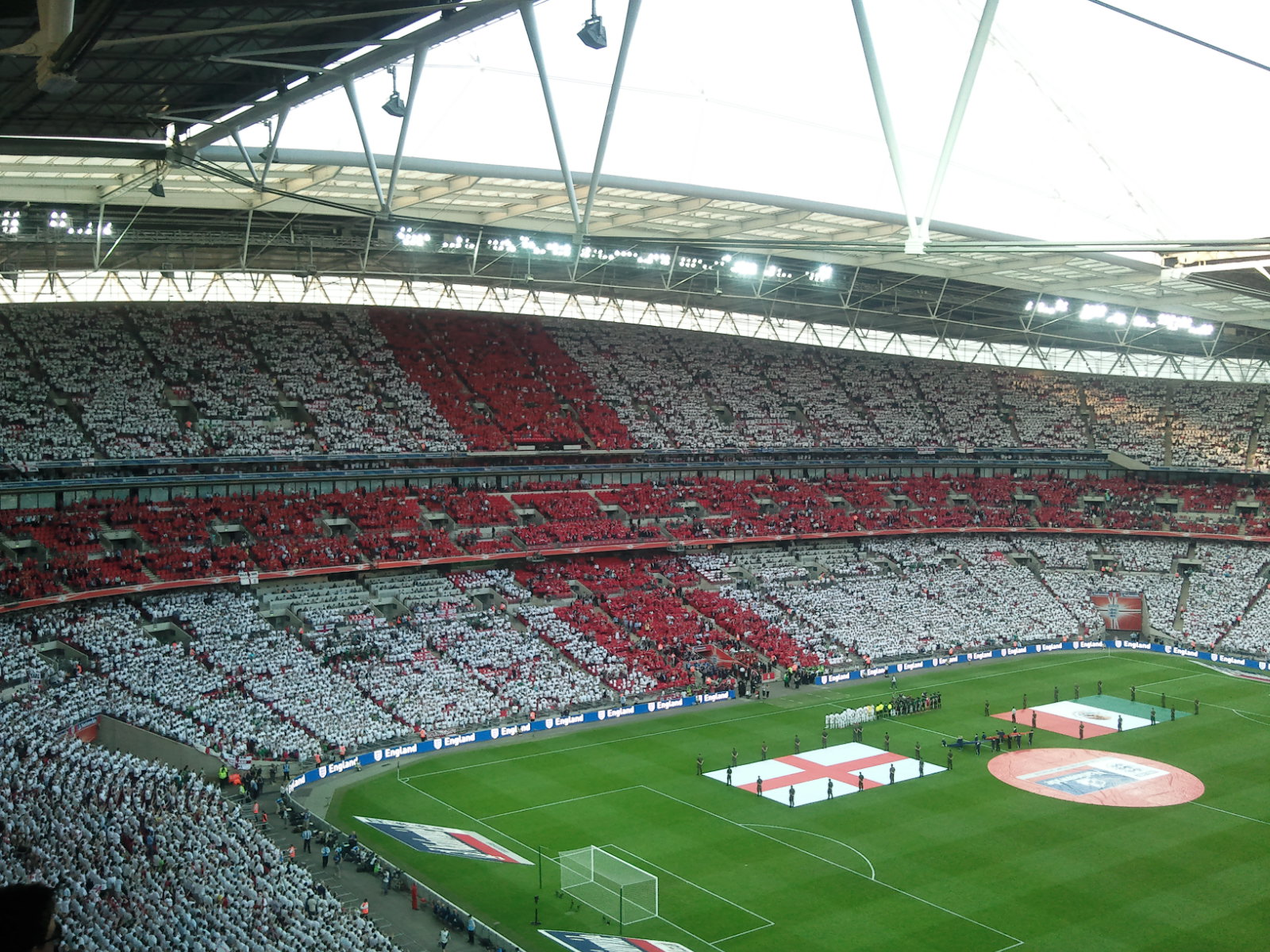
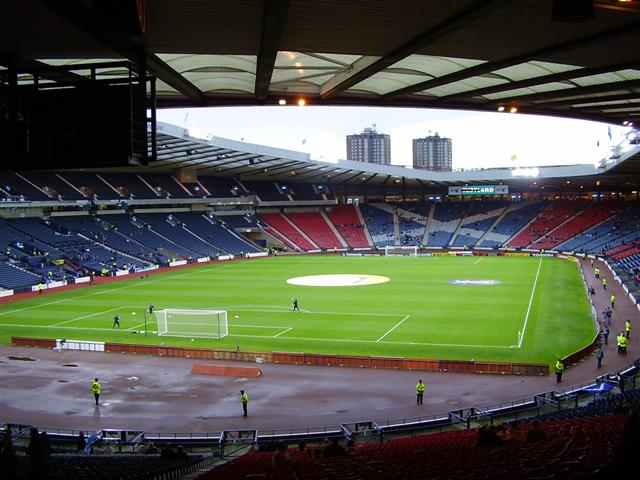
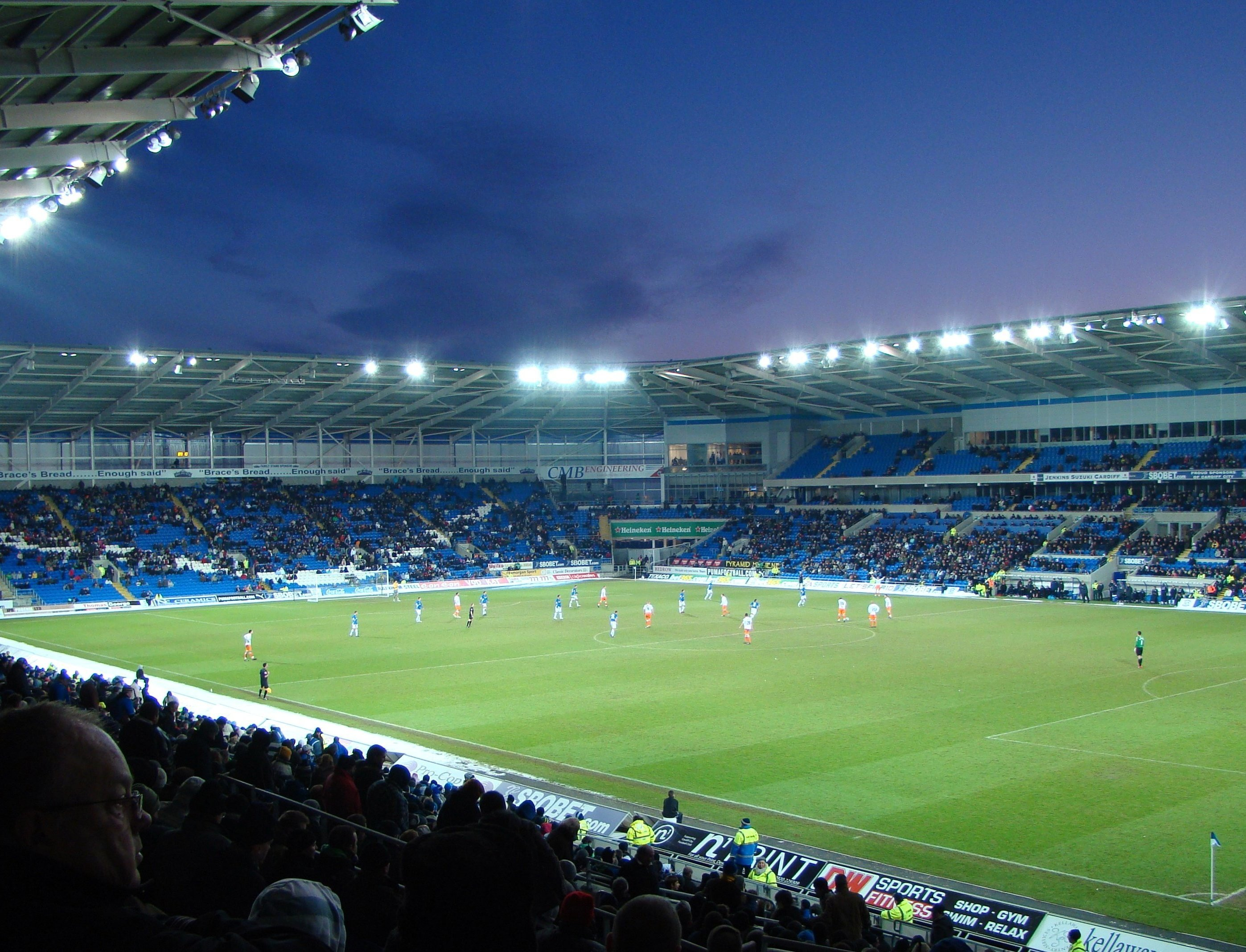
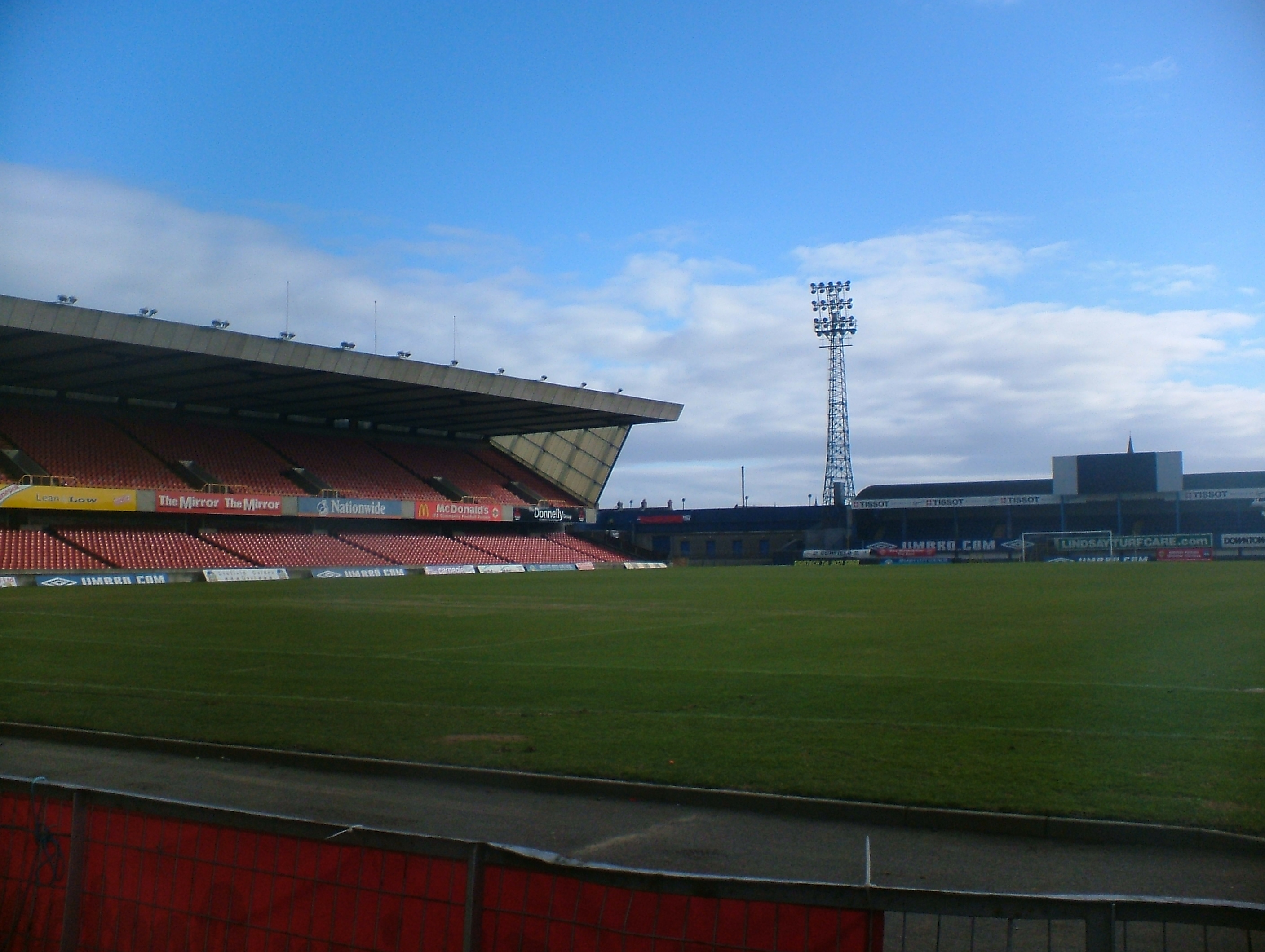
The four national football stadiums of the UK.

Each of the home nations has a "national stadium" in which they play the majority of their home games:

- England – Wembley Stadium, London (90,000)
- Scotland – Hampden Park, Glasgow (51,866)
- Wales – Cardiff City Stadium, Cardiff (33,280) (Note: While the Cardiff City Stadium is the most commonly used venue for Wales home games, the Millennium Stadium, Liberty Stadium, and Racecourse Ground are also commonly used.)
- Northern Ireland – Windsor Park, Belfast (15,000)

The Millennium Stadium, which has also been used for Wales home matches, is used primarily by the Welsh national rugby union team for its home internationals, while Windsor Park is a club ground owned by Linfield that the IFA leases for use by the Northern Ireland national team. In the event that the stadium is unavailable, the national team will usually play at a club ground.

These are the top twelve football stadiums in the UK by capacity (all with capacity above 50,000).

Stadium	City	Tenants	Capacity
Wembley Stadium	(England) London	England national football team	90,000
Old Trafford	(England) Stretford	Manchester United	75,731
Millennium Stadium (Note: The Millennium Stadium is primarily used for rugby union.)	(Wales) Cardiff	Wales national football team	74,500
London Stadium	(England) London	West Ham United	62,500
Tottenham Hotspur Stadium	(England) London	Tottenham Hotspur	62,062
Anfield	(England) Liverpool	Liverpool FC	61,276
Celtic Park	(Scotland) Glasgow	Celtic FC	60,411
Emirates Stadium	(England) London	Arsenal FC	60,260
City of Manchester Stadium	(England) Manchester	Manchester City	55,097
St James' Park	(England) Newcastle upon Tyne	Newcastle United	52,404
Hampden Park	(Scotland) Glasgow	Scotland national football team	51,866
Ibrox Stadium	(Scotland) Glasgow	Rangers FC	50,817

== Media ==
=== Television ===
Sky Sports are the main broadcasters of domestic league games in the United Kingdom with the network regularly showing Premier League, EFL Championship, Scottish Premiership, and FA Women's Super League matches on a weekly basis. The network will occasionally broadcast League One and League Two matches as well as selected fixtures from the EFL Cup and EFL Trophy. The BBC and ITV hold broadcasting rights for the FA Cup.

Matches of continental club competitions, the Champions League, Europa League, Europa Conference League, and Women's Champions League are shown on BT Sport. The network also airs domestic games from foreign league and regularly shows La Liga, Serie A, Ligue 1, and MLS matches. The network use to hold rights to air Bundesliga matches, but these are now shown by Sky Sports. Occasional J1 League, K League, and A-League matches are also shown. The network also broadcasts the occasional National League match and assists in broadcasting the FA Cup. BT Sport also shows the Premier League's early Saturday match.

FreeSports broadcasts some live matches of several leagues, including La Liga, Ekstraklasa, Chinese Super League, Major League Soccer, Brasileirão and others, free-to-air.

England national team matches are shown on BBC and ITV Sports with both networks splitting coverage during the FIFA World Cup and UEFA European Championships in addition to covering all other matches of the tournament, whist Channel 4 show all of England's UEFA Nations League and European qualifiers matches. Sky Sports, by whom they were previously shown, broadcast Nations League and tournament qualification games for Scotland, Wales, and Northern Ireland in addition to other selected international matches. All matches of the Wales national team are also aired in Welsh on the BBC channel S4C.

The BBC air a weekly preview show Football Focus on BBC One on Saturday lunchtime for all football related topics, and in the late afternoon Final Score is shown on the channel which provides a quick round up of all 3 pm Saturday games in England's top five, Scotland's top four, and Wales' top divisions of each respective league, games which by law cannot be televised in the UK. Broadcast on Saturday and Sunday nights on BBC One, Match of the Day and Match of the Day 2 shows highlights and analysis from Saturday's and Sunday's Premier League matches respectively. The Women's Football Show follows Match of the Day and provides highlights and analysis of the weekend's Women's Super League matches. Highlights and analysis from the Football League (EFL) are broadcast on ITV4.

== Tournaments hosted ==
Competition	Year	Home Nations who Hosted
Football at the Summer Olympics	1908	England (Note: Officially, all of the United Kingdom were hosts, however only home nations shown hosted matches.)
Football at the Summer Olympics	1948	England
FIFA World Cup	1966	England
UEFA Women's Championship	1984	England (Note: Part of a pan-European tournament.)
UEFA Women's Championship	1995	England
UEFA European Championship	1996	England
UEFA Women's Championship	2005	England
Football at the Summer Olympics	2012	England; Scotland; Wales
UEFA European Championship	2020 (Note: Delayed to 2021 due to the COVID-19 pandemic)	England; Scotland
UEFA Women's Championship	2021 (Note: Delayed to 2022 due to the COVID-19 pandemic)	England
UEFA European Championship	2028	England; Scotland; Wales; Northern Ireland
FIFA Women's World Cup	2035	England; Scotland; Wales; Northern Ireland

== National football centres ==
Currently, none of the British nations except for England operates a national academy. St George's Park National Football Centre, Burton upon Trent was officially opened on 9 October 2012.

== National football museums ==
- England: The National Football Museum Based at Urbis in Manchester. Holds collections of International, European and National significance. Charts the history of football and the game in England.
- Scotland: The Scottish Football Museum Housed at Hampden Park in Glasgow. Holds collections of International and National significance. Charts the history of Scottish Football.

== See also ==
- Sport in the United Kingdom
- Football in Northern Ireland
- Football in Yorkshire
- Football in Scotland
- Football in England
- Football in London
- Football in Wales
