= Climate of the British Isles =

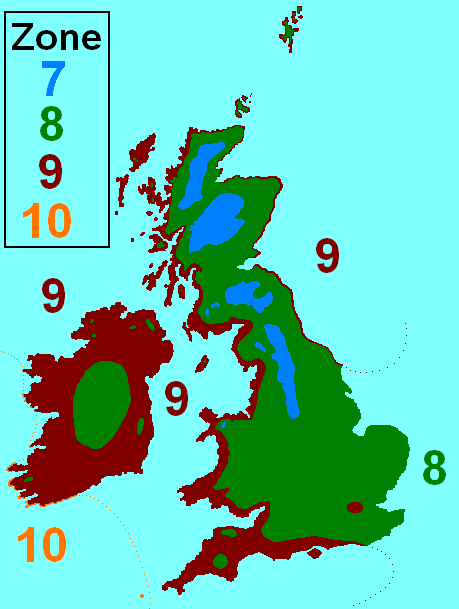
Hardiness zones in the British Isles

The British Isles are an archipelago off the northwest coast of Europe, consisting of the islands of Great Britain and Ireland along with smaller surrounding ones. Its position allows dry continental air from Eurasia to meet wetter air from the Atlantic Ocean, which causes the weather to be highly variable, often changing many times during the day. It is defined as a temperate oceanic climate, or Cfb on the Köppen climate classification system. It is significantly warmer than other regions of the same latitude; this is generally thought to be due to the warmth provided by the Gulf Stream, but an alternative hypothesis is that it is caused by southerly winds arising in the Rocky Mountains of North America and the heat-storing capabilities of the North Atlantic Ocean. Temperatures do not often switch between great extremes. The Isles experience warm summers and cool winters, although brief heat and cold waves happen fairly regularly.

== Temperature ==
The British Isles undergo relatively modest temperature variations. This is due to its proximity to the Atlantic, which acts as a temperature buffer, warming the Isles in winter and cooling them in summer. Coastal areas tend to be more temperate than inland areas, as the influence of the ocean is less acute. Valleys can be especially cold, as cool air collects in them during the winter. July is usually the warmest month, with the highest temperatures being found closest to Continental Europe, in south-east England.

Although average seasonal fluctuations are fairly low, short intense waves of heat and cold mean there can be more than 40°C between the highest and lowest temperatures in a single year in a given place.

== Sunshine and cloud ==
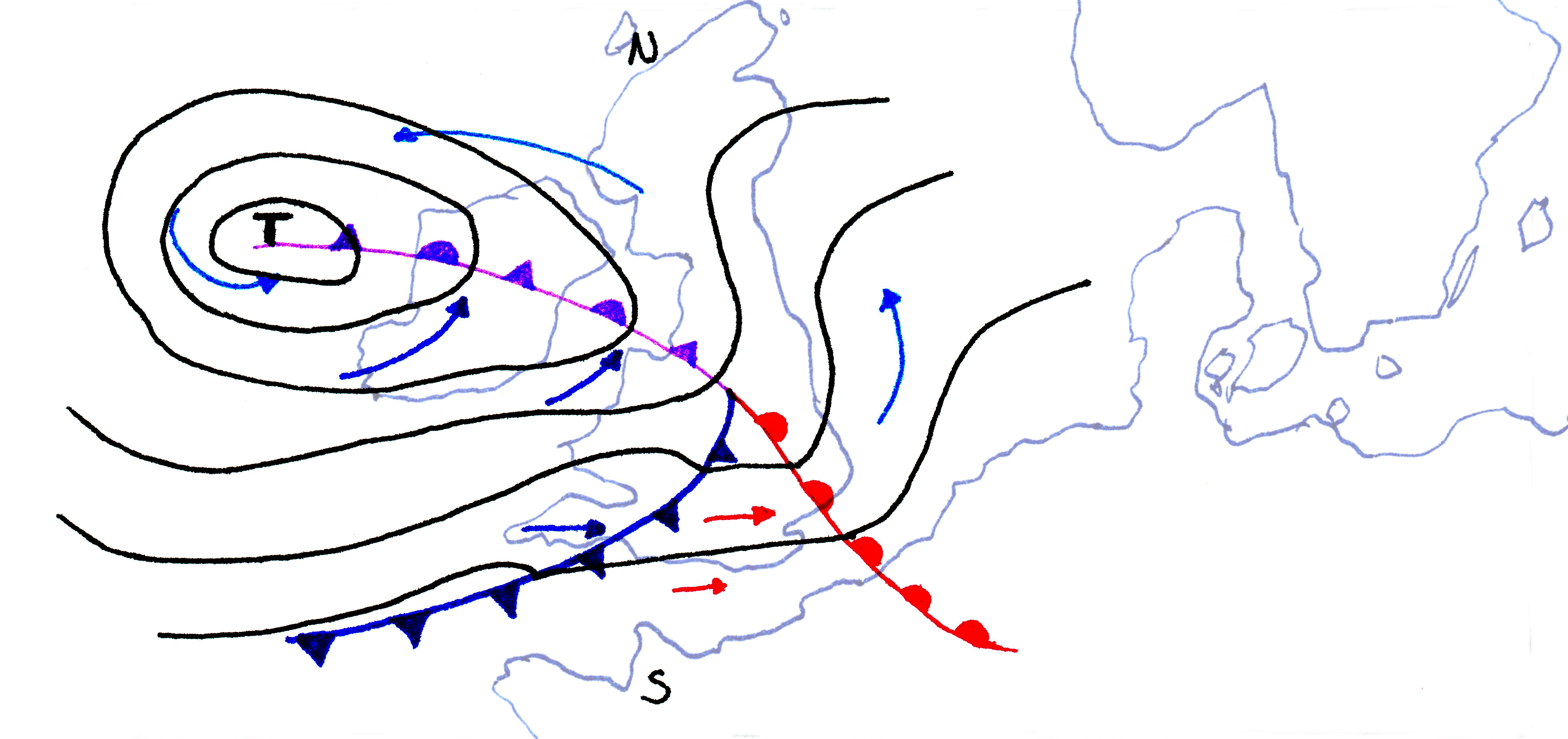
A typical North Atlantic low-pressure area moving across the British Isles

The sunniest times are the months of May and June, whereas December has the least sunshine. The clearest skies in the British Isles occur over the south of England, due to the winds from the continent. Equally, mountainous areas, especially in the North-west receive barely any sunshine, sometimes less than 1000 hours a year. In winter on north-south valleys there are sometimes only a few hours of sunshine in a day.

Radiation fog may develop over inland areas of Great Britain and can persist for hours or even days in the winter and can pose a major hazard for drivers and aircraft. Fog is more common inland and on higher altitudes; mainly during winter and during the morning at times of high pressure.

On occasions blocking anticyclones (high pressure systems) may move over the British Isles, which can persist for weeks or even months. The subsided, dry air often results in clear skies and few clouds, bringing frosty nights in winter and hot days in the summer, when some coastal areas can achieve almost maximum possible sunshine for periods of weeks.

== Precipitation ==
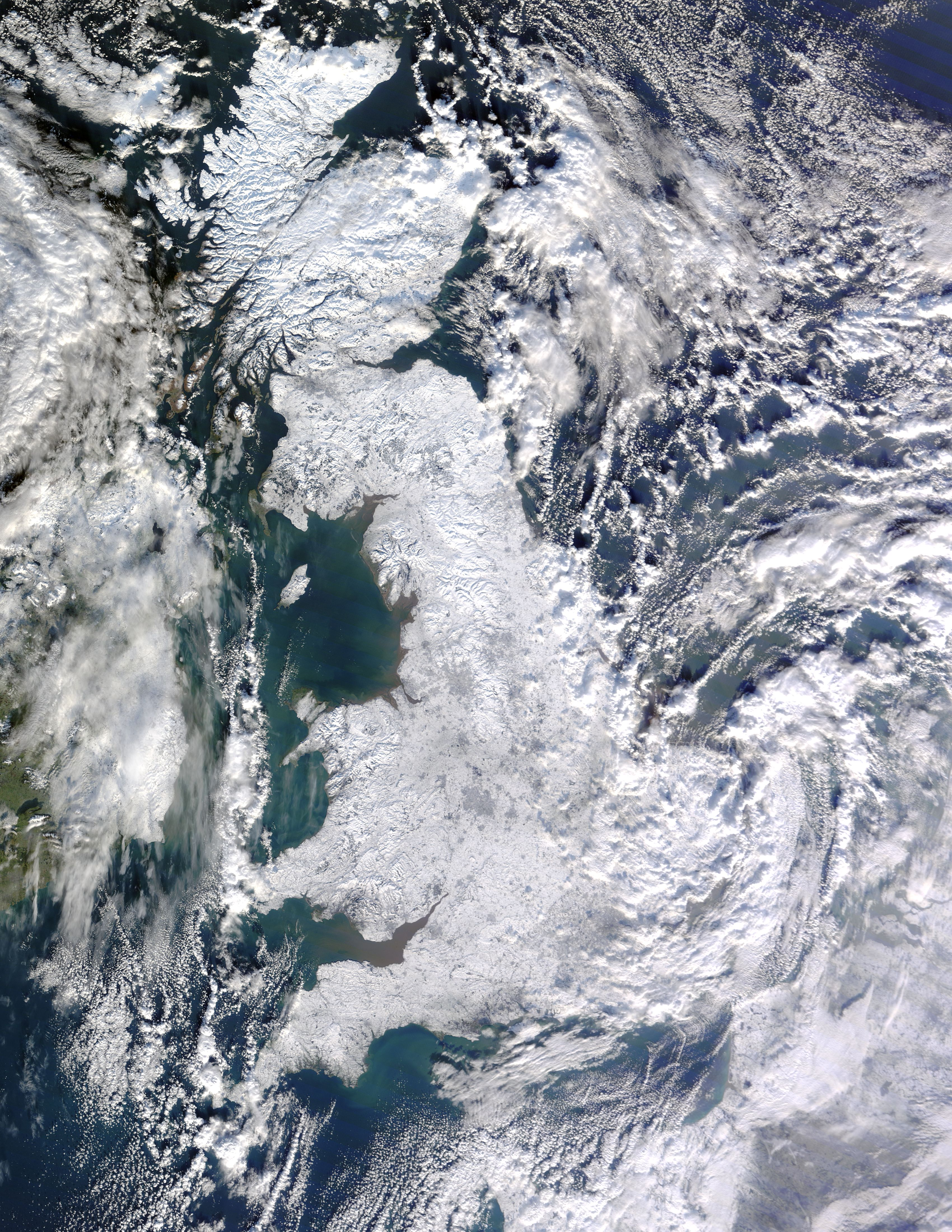
Great Britain in the winter of 2009-2010

Rainfall varies across the Isles, with a general trend to more rain farther west and in higher elevations. December and January are usually the wettest months. The mountain ranges are the wettest areas in the U.K. These are some of the wettest locations in Britain. Most rainfall comes from North Atlantic depressions occur throughout the year and are particularly frequent and intense in the autumn and winter. They can on occasions bring prolonged periods of heavy rain, and flooding is quite common.

Snow can occur during winter months, most frequently occurring during January and February. Hail is relatively common, and is most common during the summer months. Each of the United Kingdom's 50 strongest hailstorms on record since 1650 have occurred between the months of May and September.

== Winds ==
The prevailing winds over the British Isles are from the west and south-west, and winds are strongest to the north and west. Generally, the coast tends to be windier than inland areas; and the west tends to be windier than the east.

Gales – which are defined as winds with speeds above 34 knots (39 mph; 63 km/h) for any ten consecutive minutes – are strongly associated with the passage of deep depressions across the area. The Hebrides typically experience a 25 days a year containing gales.

== Severe weather ==
The British Isles do not experience extreme weather regularly. There have been several occasions where extreme weather events have occurred. In the winter of 1982, for a few days parts of central and southern England experienced temperatures lower than central Europe and Moscow. In contrast, the summers of 1975 and 1976 experienced temperatures as high as 35 °C (95 °F). It was so dry the country suffered drought and water shortages. Extended periods of extreme weather, such as the drought of 1975–1976 and 2022 as well as the very cold winters of 1946–1947, 1962–1963, 1978–79, 1981–1982 and 2009–2010, are often caused by blocking anticyclones which can persist several days or even weeks. In winter they can bring long periods of cold dry weather and in summer long periods of hot dry weather.

=== Cyclones ===
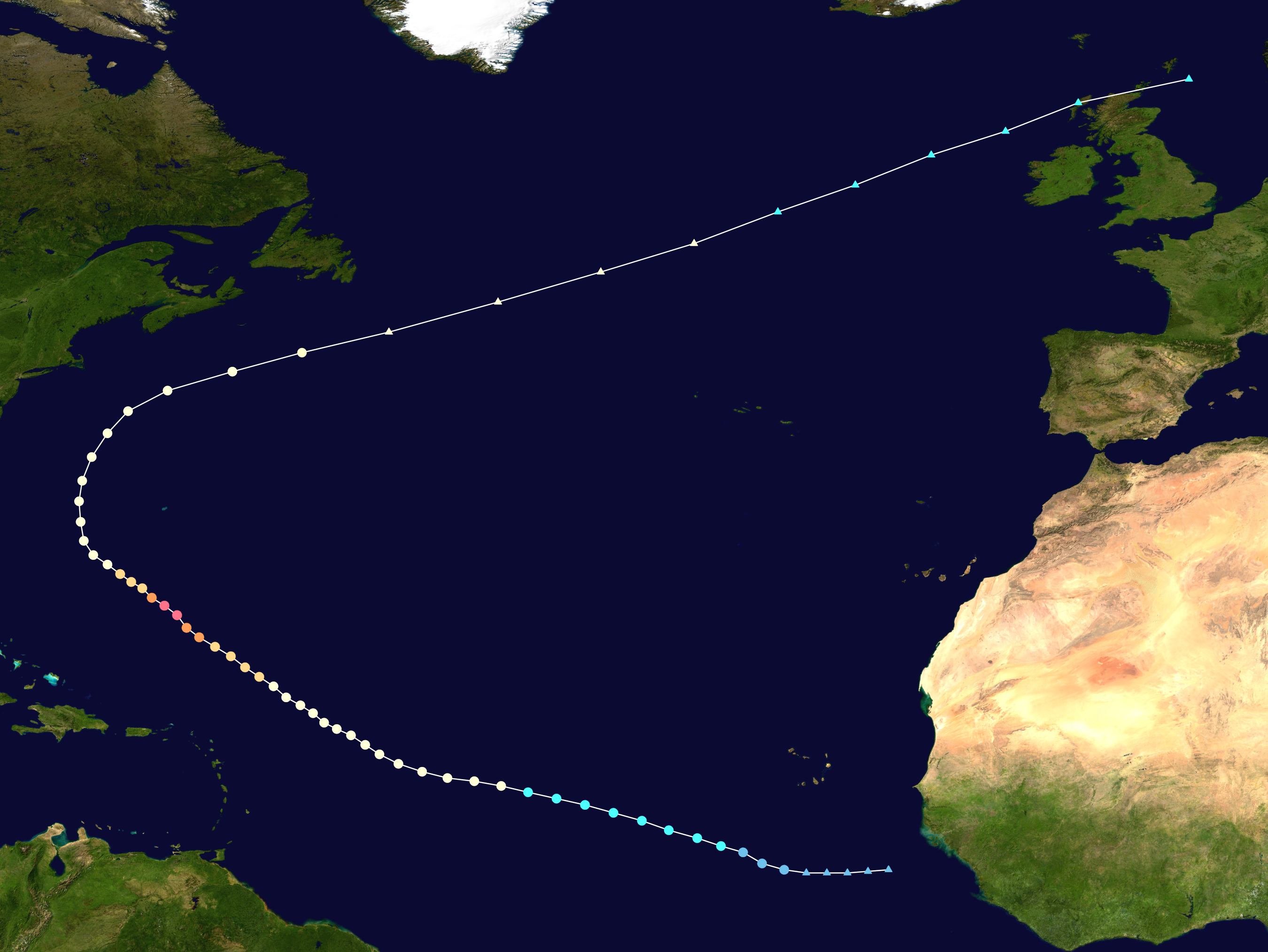
Hurricane Katia's path

Tropical cyclones themselves do not affect the British Isles due to the cold temperature of the surrounding ocean. Any tropical cyclone that comes near the Isles has said to have undergone a process called extratropical transition. The Isles do experience these extratropical cyclones, the Great Storm of 1987 was a deep depression which formed in the Bay of Biscay, which also contained the remnants of Hurricane Floyd. Hurricane Lili of 1996 and Hurricane Gordon of 2006 both were strong extratropical cyclones with tropical storm-force winds, which caused transport closures, power-cuts and flooding. In 2011, the remnants of Hurricane Katia brought near hurricane-force winds to Scotland, with sustained winds reaching 70 mph (110 km/h) while centred over the Isle of Lewis. In 2017, Hurricane Ophelia brought severe storms to Ireland, and carried Saharan dust and smoke from wildfires in Portugal into the atmosphere over the United Kingdom, creating red and orange skies across the country.

=== Thunderstorms ===
Thunderstorms are most common in London, the South-East, east of England, the East Midlands, and least common in the North-West. Greater London, Kent, Sussex, Essex, Hertfordshire, Cambridgeshire, Suffolk and Norfolk are the regions with the most thunderstorms during the year. The South-West and the West Midlands also get storms but usually less severe. Occasionally, thunderstorms can be severe and produce large hailstones as seen in Ottery St Mary, Devon in October 2008, where drifts reached 1.8 metres (5 ft 11 in).

== Climate change ==
Estimates produced by the Met Office predict average annual temperature to increase by 2 °C (4 °F) and the warmest summer day to increase by 3 °C (6 °F) by the 2050s. Average winter rainfall is also likely to increase and most areas will see a slight decrease in annual rainfall.

=== Recent events ===
In the early 21st century, the British Isles have undergone some record breaking events. In 2004-2006, a partial drought caused fires to break out throughout the south of Great Britain, and water restrictions were introduced in some areas. The drought problems were solved due to the unusually wet period between October 2006 and July 2007, which had higher than average rainfall.

The year 2006 was an unusually warm one. Although the year started off cool, from April the weather stayed warmer than average. July was the hottest month on record for the United Kingdom.(The summer of 2022 has since reached 40C in some areas.)

== See also ==
- Climate of the United Kingdom
- Climate of Ireland
