= Cricket in the British Isles =

Cricket in the British Isles includes:

- Cricket in England
- Cricket in Ireland
- Cricket in Scotland
- Cricket in Wales
- Isle of Man cricket team
- Guernsey cricket team
- Jersey cricket team
