= Lego Mickey Mouse =

Lego theme based on Mickey Mouse

- Licensed from: Disney
- Availability: 2000–end
- Total sets: 10
- Characters: Mickey Mouse, Minnie Mouse, Pluto, Goofy, Chip 'n' Dale

Lego Mickey Mouse is a discontinued Lego theme based on the Disney animated short characters Mickey Mouse, Minnie Mouse, and Pluto.

== Sets ==
Five of the sets consisted of regular lego brick structures and vehicles provided with model dolls of Mickey with either Minnie or even Pluto. Three other sets had Lego Baby bricks with model dolls of Baby Mickey and (in two of those) Baby Minnie. One set had Lego Duplo bricks with the characters Mickey, Minnie, Pluto, Goofy and Chip 'n' Dale in the form of coloured bricks corresponding to their attire with their faces on the top bricks. This was packed with Minnie's house and Mickey's house in a storage bucket. The last set also had Lego Duplo bricks but with model dolls of Mickey and Minnie.

Set No.	Set	Release	Pieces	Minifigures	Ref.
2592	Baby Mickey & Baby Minnie	2000	18	Baby Mickey, Baby Minnie	
2593	Baby Mickey	2000	8	Baby Mickey	
2594	Baby Mickey & Baby Minnie Playground	2000	9	Baby Mickey, Baby Minnie	
4164	Mickey's Fire Engine	2000	26	Mickey Mouse	
4165	Minnie's Birthday Party	2000	82	Mickey Mouse, Minnie Mouse	
4166	Mickey's Car Garage	2000	88	Mickey Mouse	
4167	Mickey's Mansion	2000	119	Mickey Mouse, Minnie Mouse, Pluto	
4178	Mickey's Fishing Adventure	2000	104	Mickey Mouse, Minnie Mouse	
10531	Mickey Mouse and Friends	2012	65	Mickey Mouse, Minnie Mouse, Pluto, Goofy, Chip 'n' Dale	
10597	Mickey & Minnie Birthday Parade	2015	25	Mickey Mouse, Minnie Mouse	

== Continuation ==
After 2015, many more Lego and Duplo building sets of Micky Mouse were made.
