= Alderney official football team =

Official football team in international football

Alderney
- Association: Alderney F.C.
- Head coach: Josh Concanen
- Most caps: Josh Concanen; Ross Benfield (10)
- Top scorer: John Gollop; Josh McCullouch (3)
- Home stadium: Arsenal Ground
First colours

First international
- Guernsey 6–0 Alderney (Saint Peter Port, Guernsey; 17 April 1905)

Biggest win
- Falkland Islands 0–3 Alderney (Visby, Gotland; 29 June 2017)

Biggest defeat
- Jersey 18–0 Alderney (Saint Helier, Jersey; 19 March 1994)

The Alderney official football team is the official football team representing Alderney (the third largest of the Channel Islands) in non-FIFA international football. They play their home matches at Arsenal Ground. They are not affiliated with FIFA or UEFA.

The team plays in the Muratti Vase, a cup competition started in 1905, in which the Channel Islands of Alderney, Guernsey and Jersey play against each other. Alderney have only won the competition once, in 1920. The Muratti format requires Alderney to play a semi-final match against the other islands on a rota basis but always with Alderney being the home side. The winner of the match goes on to play the remaining island in the final. Alderney also play the occasional game outside the Muratti competition including taking part in the Island Games football tournament in 2003 in which they finished 11th out of a pool of 15.

An Alderney Football Club side was formed to play in the 2016–17 Guernsey Priaulx League.

The Alderney national football team won their first match in 14 years at the 2017 Island Games, beating the Falkland Islands 0–3 in a 15th place play off.

== Results and fixtures ==
16 June 2019 2019 Inter Games Football Tournament	Alderney	2–4	Hitra	Cemaes Bay, Anglesey
19:30				Stadium: School Lane

18 June 2019 2019 Inter Games Football Tournament	Isle of Man	6–1	Alderney	Llannerch-y-medd, Anglesey
18:00	Jacob Crook 9'; Lee Gale 39', 62' (pen.); Sean Doyle 40', 56'; Dan Simpson 89'		Josh McCullouch (?)	Stadium: Tan Parc

20 June 2019 2019 Inter Games Football Tournament	Orkney	1–2	Alderney	Bodorgan, Anglesey
13:00	Owen Rendall (?)		Josh McCullouch 44'; Joe Blackham 87'	Stadium: Trefdraeth

23 April 2022 2022 Muratti Vase	Alderney	0–2	Guernsey	Saint Anne, Alderney
13:00				Stadium: Arsenal Ground

25 March 2023 2023 Muratti Vase	Alderney	1–6	Jersey	Saint Anne, Alderney
13:00	Blackham (?)			Stadium: Arsenal Ground

23 March 2024 2024 Muratti Vase	Alderney	1–4	Guernsey	Saint Anne, Alderney
12:30				Stadium: Arsenal Ground

22 March 2025 2025 Muratti Vase	Alderney	0-2	Jersey	Saint Anne, Alderney
12:30				Stadium: Arsenal Ground

11 March 2025 2026 Muratti Vase	Alderney	1-2	Guernsey	Saint Anne, Alderney
13:00				Stadium: Arsenal Ground

== Selected Internationals opponents ==
As of 11 March 2026 after match against Guernsey

Opponent	P	W	D	L	GF	GA	GD	Win %
Falkland Islands	2	1	0	1	3	3	+0	50.00
Felvidék	1	0	0	1	1	2	−1	0.00
Gibraltar	1	0	0	1	1	6	−5	0.00
Greenland	1	0	0	1	0	3	−3	0.00
Guernsey	55	1	0	54	24	254	−230	1.82
Hitra	2	0	0	2	3	9	−6	0.00
Isle of Man	1	0	0	1	1	6	−5	0.00
Isle of Wight	1	0	0	1	0	3	−3	0.00
Jersey	47	0	0	47	23	257	−234	0.00
Menorca	1	0	0	1	0	6	−6	0.00
Orkney	3	1	0	2	3	7	−4	33.33
Panjab	1	0	0	1	1	9	−8	0.00
Raetia	1	0	0	1	2	3	−1	0.00
Rhodes	1	0	0	1	1	5	−4	0.00
Saaremaa	1	1	0	0	1	0	+1	100.00
Sealand	3	0	1	2	3	5	−2	0.00
Ynys Môn	1	0	0	1	0	5	−5	0.00
Total	121	4	1	116	66	579	−513	3.31

== Competitive record ==
=== Island Games ===
Island Games record
Year	Round	Position	GP	W	D	L	GS	GA
(Faroe Islands) 1989	Did not enter							
(Åland) 1991	Did not enter							
(Isle of Wight) 1993	Did not enter							
(Gibraltar) 1995	Did not enter							
(Jersey) 1997	Did not enter							
(Gotland) 1999	Did not enter							
(Isle of Man) 2001	Did not enter							
(Guernsey) 2003	Group stage	11th	5	1	0	4	4	18
(Shetland) 2005	Did not enter							
(Rhodes) 2007	Did not enter							
(Åland) 2009	Did not enter							
(Isle of Wight) 2011	Group stage	14th	4	0	0	4	1	18
(Bermuda) 2013	Did not enter							
(Jersey) 2015	Group stage	16th	4	0	0	4	3	21
(Gotland) 2017	Group stage	15th	4	1	0	3	3	12
(Gibraltar) 2019 (Note: Not held football tournament (Replaced by 2019 Inter Games Football Tournament in Anglesey).)	Group stage	7th	3	1	0	2	5	11
(Guernsey) 2023	Did not participate							
Total	Group stage	5/17	20	3	0	17	16	80

=== Muratti Vase ===
Muratti Vase record
Year	Result	GP	W	D	L	GS	GA
1905	Third place	1	0	0	1	0	6
1906	Runners-up	1	0	0	1	0	1
1907	Third place	1	0	0	1	1	2
1908	Third place	1	0	0	1	0	3
1909	Runners-up	1	0	0	1	0	2
1910	Third place	1	0	0	1	1	7
1911	Third place	1	0	0	1	1	2
1912	Runners-up	1	0	0	1	0	4
1913	Third place	1	0	0	1	2	5
1914	Third place	1	0	0	1	0	4
1920	Champions	1	1	0	0	1	0
1921	Third place	1	0	0	1	0	2
1922	Third place	1	0	0	1	0	8
1923	Runners-up	1	0	0	1	2	3
1924	Third place	1	0	0	1	0	1
1925	Third place	1	0	0	1	0	3
1926	Runners-up	1	0	0	1	1	7
1927	Third place	1	0	0	1	0	3
1928	Third place	1	0	0	1	0	4
1929	Runners-up	1	0	0	1	0	5
1930	Third place	1	0	0	1	2	3
1931	Third place	1	0	0	1	0	1
1932	Runners-up	1	0	0	1	2	4
1933	Third place	1	0	0	1	0	6
1934	Third place	1	0	0	1	0	3
1935	Runners-up	1	0	0	1	0	5
1936	Third place	1	0	0	1	0	9
1937	Third place	1	0	0	1	1	4
1938	Runners-up	1	0	0	1	1	3
1939	Third place	1	0	0	1	1	2
1947	Withdrew						
1948	Third place	1	0	0	1	0	3
1949	Third place	1	0	0	1	0	9
1950	Third place	1	0	0	1	1	3
1951	Third place	1	0	0	1	1	8
1952	Third place	1	0	0	1	2	7
1953	Third place	1	0	0	1	0	4
1954	Third place	1	0	0	1	1	2
1955	Third place	1	0	0	1	0	3
1956	Third place	1	0	0	1	0	4
1957	Third place	1	0	0	1	1	7
1958	Third place	1	0	0	1	2	8
1959	Third place	1	0	0	1	0	6
1960	Third place	1	0	0	1	1	5
1961	Third place	1	0	0	1	2	4
1962	Third place	1	0	0	1	1	6
1963	Third place	1	0	0	1	0	6
1964	Third place	1	0	0	1	0	3
1965	Third place	1	0	0	1	0	8
1966	Third place	1	0	0	1	0	10
1967	Third place	1	0	0	1	1	3
1968	Third place	1	0	0	1	0	2
1969	Third place	1	0	0	1	0	5
1970	Third place	1	0	0	1	0	5
1971	Third place	1	0	0	1	0	11
1972	Third place	1	0	0	1	0	5
1973	Third place	1	0	0	1	1	6
1974	Third place	1	0	0	1	0	6
1975	Third place	1	0	0	1	1	3
1976	Third place	1	0	0	1	0	5
1977	Third place	1	0	0	1	0	3
1978	Third place	1	0	0	1	0	12
1979	Third place	1	0	0	1	0	8
1980	Third place	1	0	0	1	0	5
1981	Third place	1	0	0	1	0	5
1982	Third place	1	0	0	1	1	6
1983	Third place	1	0	0	1	1	6
1984	Third place	1	0	0	1	0	6
1985	Third place	1	0	0	1	0	5
1986	Third place	1	0	0	1	0	7
1987	Third place	1	0	0	1	0	10
1988	Third place	1	0	0	1	1	5
1989	Third place	1	0	0	1	0	4
1990	Third place	1	0	0	1	0	4
1991	Third place	1	0	0	1	1	4
1992	Third place	1	0	0	1	1	9
1993	Third place	1	0	0	1	0	10
1994	Third place	1	0	0	1	0	18
1995	Third place	1	0	0	1	1	3
1996	Third place	1	0	0	1	0	2
1997	Third place	1	0	0	1	0	6
1998	Third place	1	0	0	1	0	2
1999	Third place	1	0	0	1	0	1
2000	Third place	1	0	0	1	0	10
2001	Third place	1	0	0	1	0	6
2002	Third place	1	0	0	1	1	2
2003	Third place	1	0	0	1	1	4
2004	Third place	1	0	0	1	0	4
2005	Third place	1	0	0	1	1	2
2006	Third place	1	0	0	1	1	4
2007	Third place	1	0	0	1	1	4
2008	Third place	1	0	0	1	0	7
2009	Third place	1	0	0	1	0	5
2010	Third place	1	0	0	1	0	3
2011	Third place	1	0	0	1	0	5
2012	Third place	1	0	0	1	0	7
2013	Third place	1	0	0	1	2	9
2014	Third place	1	0	0	1	0	4
2015	Third place	1	0	0	1	0	5
2016	Third place	1	0	0	1	0	1
2017	Third place	1	0	0	1	1	2
2018	Third place	1	0	0	1	0	2
2019	Third place	1	0	0	1	0	2
2022	Third place	1	0	0	1	0	2
2023	Third place	1	0	0	1	1	6
2024	Third place	1	0	0	1	1	4
2025	Third place	1	0	0	1	0	2
2026	Third place	1	0	0	1	1	2
Total	1 title	108	1	0	107	47	520

== Managers ==
- (Alderney) Craig Culkin (1994–2011)
- (Scotland) Alan Adamson (2011–2019)
- (Alderney) Josh Concanen (2019–present)
