= Saint Helena football team =

Men's association football team

Saint Helena
- Association: Saint Helena Football Association
- Head coach: Nick Stevens
- Captain: Rico Benjamin
- Most caps: Rico Benjamin; Ronan Legg (5)
- Top scorer: Rico Benjamin (4)
First colours	Second colours

First international
- Ynys Môn 7–2 Saint Helena (Bryn Du, Anglesey; 12 June 2019)

Biggest win
- Saint Helena 2–0 Holyhead Hotspur Football Club

Biggest defeat
- Guernsey 9–0 Saint Helena (Holyhead, Anglesey; 18 June 2019)

Island Games
- Appearances: 2 (first in 2019)
- Best result: Tenth place (2019)

The Saint Helena football team represents the island of Saint Helena in the South Atlantic Ocean. Saint Helena is not affiliated with FIFA but is a member of the International Island Games Association.

Saint Helena played their first match in 1949 and made their international debut at the 2019 Inter Games Football Tournament. They also competed at the 2023 Island Games in Guernsey. They have only ever won one match – a 2–0 win in a friendly against Holyhead Hotspur reserves.

== History ==
The Saint Helena Football Association was formed in 1922. However, a football team representing the island wasn't picked until 1949. They played a friendly match in England against Lockheed Leamington in November 1949 and lost 15–3.

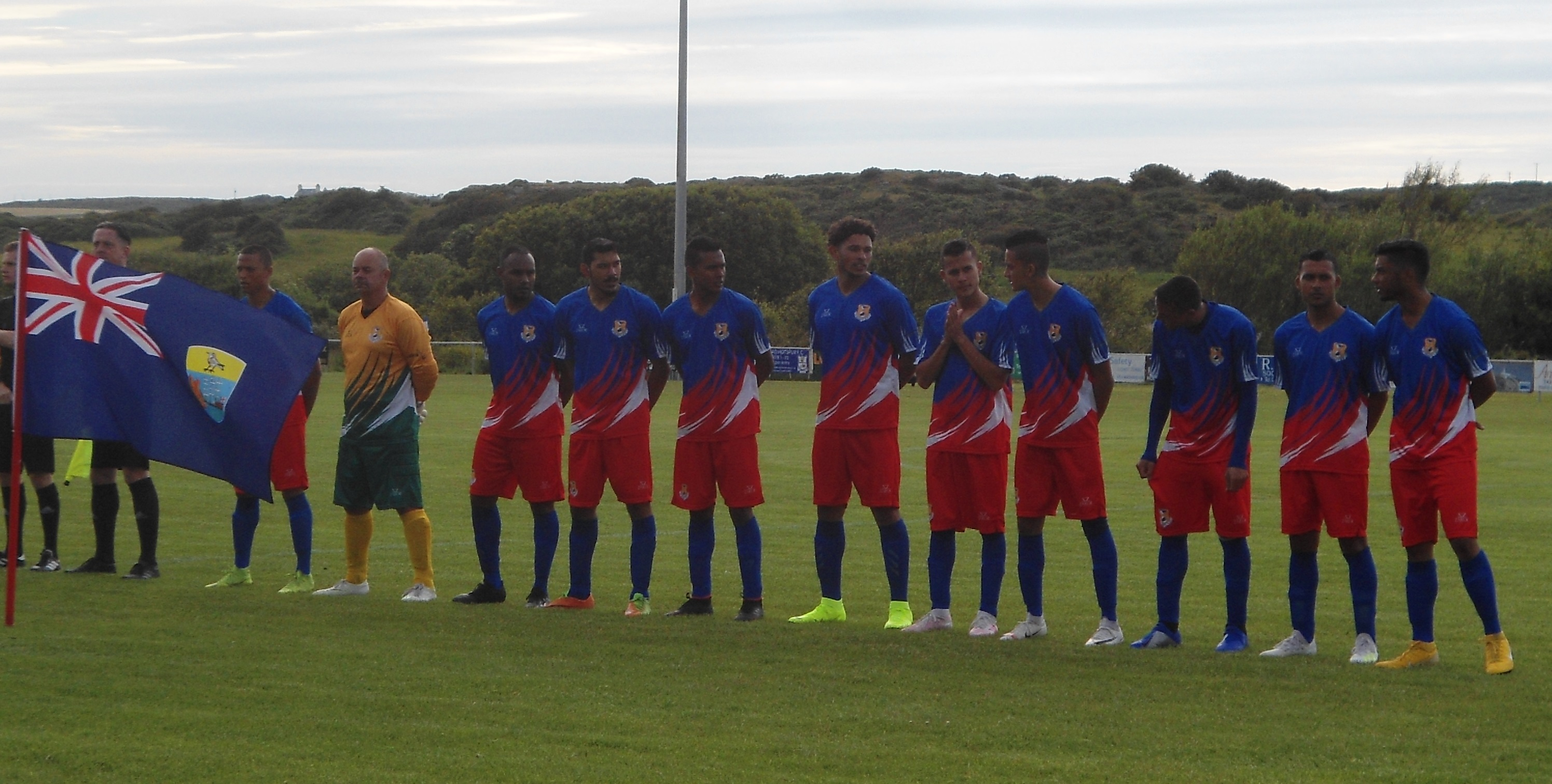
The team in June 2019

The Saint Helena Island Games Association were founder members of the International Island Games Association in 1985 allowing the island to compete from the inaugural 1985 Island Games held on the Isle of Man. It would be another 70 years before a Saint Helena team would reappear. The team had hoped to compete at the 2011 Island Games held on the Isle of Wight but were unable to raise the funds needed. However, they were able to raise the £80,000 needed to compete at the 2019 Inter Games Football Tournament.

In the build-up to the competition, the team played two friendlies, defeating Holyhead Hotspur reserves 2–0 and losing 7–2 to Ynys Môn. At the tournament, Saint Helena lost their twi group stage matches 6–1 against Shetland and 9–0 against Guernsey. Despite an equalising goal from Rico Benjamin, Saint Helena also lost their ninth-place play-off.

Saint Helena were finally able to make their Island Games debut at the 2023 Island Games in Guernsey. They lost all three of their group stage matches before losing 4–2 to Frøya in the 15th-place play-off.

== Results ==
Saint Helena's score first.

Date	Competition	Venue	Opponent	Score
12 Nov 1949	Friendly	Windmill Ground, Leamington	(England) Lockheed Leamington	3–15
10 June 2019	Friendly	Bangor	(Wales) Holyhead Hotspur reserves	2–0
12 June 2019	Friendly	Anglesey	Ynys Môn	2–7
16 June 2019	2019 Inter Games Football Tournament	Bryn Du, Anglesey	Shetland	1–6
18 June 2019	2019 Inter Games Football Tournament	Holyhead, Anglesey	Guernsey	0–9
20 June 2019	2019 Inter Games Football Tournament	Bryn Du, Anglesey	Western Isles	1–2
9 July 2023	2023 Island Games	Saint Sampson, Guernsey	Menorca	0–5
10 July 2023	2023 Island Games	Saint Sampson, Guernsey	Gozo	0–3
11 July 2023	2023 Island Games	Saint Sampson, Guernsey	Jersey	0–5
13 July 2023	2023 Island Games	Saint Martin, Guernsey	Frøya	2–4

== Historical kits ==
In home	2019 Home	2019 Away	2023 Home	2023 Away
