= Alderney F.C. =

Association football club in Alderney

Coordinates: 49.723592°N 2.183385°W

Alderney Nomads
- Full name: Alderney Nomads Football Club
- Founded: 2016; 10 years ago
- Ground: Arsenal Ground
- Capacity: 1,500
- League: Priaulx League
- 2024–25: Division 1
- Website: https://alderneyfootballclub.com/
Home colours

Alderney Nomads F.C. is a football club based on the Channel Island of Alderney. They play in the Division 1, the second tier league competition of Guernsey.

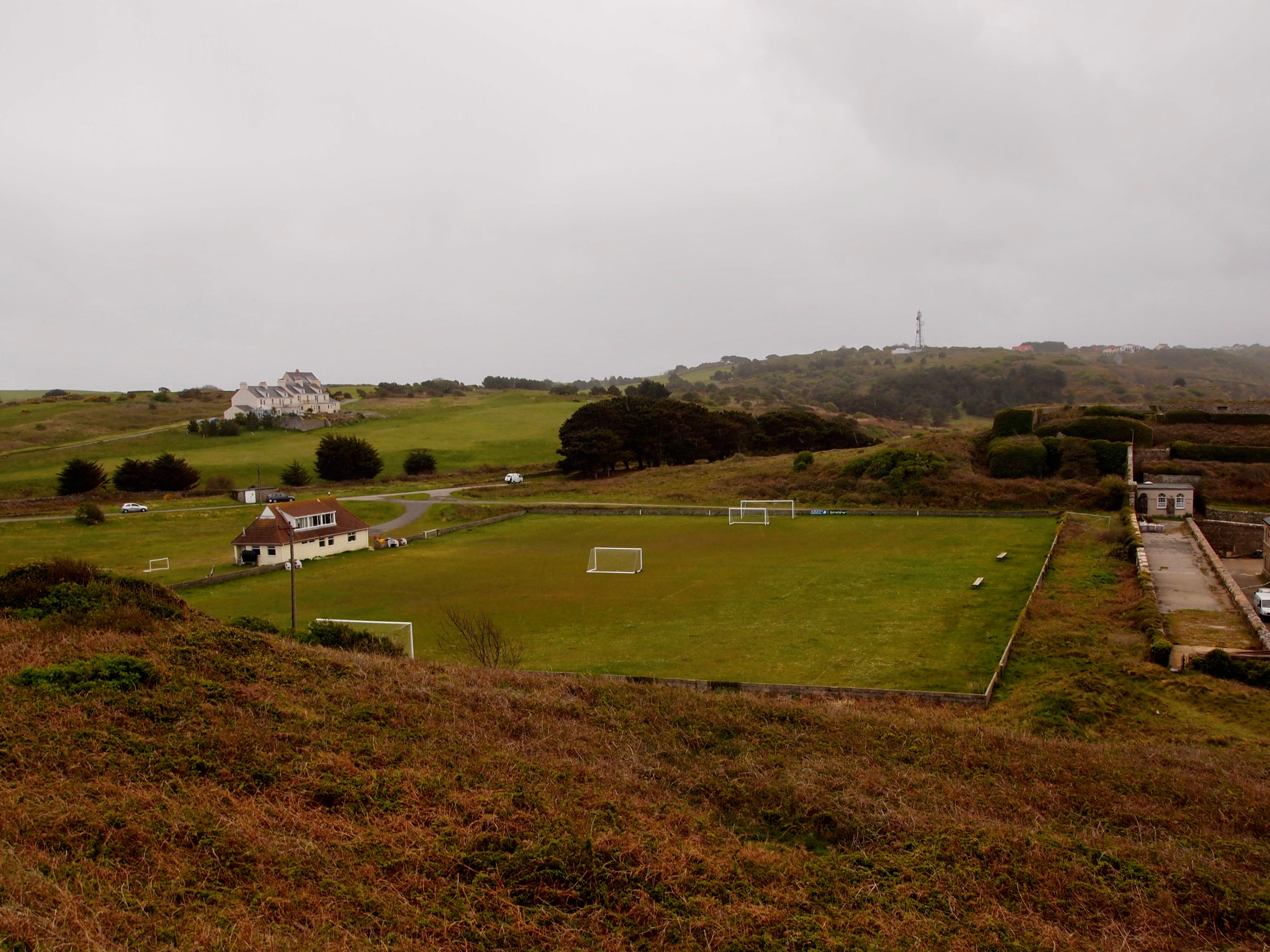
Arsenal Ground

== History ==
An offshoot of the Alderney official football team that competes in the Muratti Vase and Island Games, an Alderney FC club side was entered into the Guernsey Priaulx League for the 2016–17 season in order to give the players more game time.

== Results ==
Season	League	Position	Pld	W	D	L	GF	GA	GD	Pts
2016–17	Priaulx League	5th out of 8	21	8	3	10	35	45	–10	27
2017–18	Priaulx League	7th out of 9	24	8	4	12	32	52	–20	28
2018–19	Priaulx League	2nd out of 9	24	16	5	3	50	24	+26	53
2019–20	Priaulx League	Tournament cancelled								
2020–21	Priaulx League	9th out of 9	24	4	1	19	23	75	–52	13
2021–22	Priaulx League	6th out of 9	24	9	2	13	48	49	–1	29
2022–23	Priaulx League	8th out of 8	21	1	0	20	12	75	–63	3
2023–24	Priaulx League	8th out of 8	21	3	3	15	21	68	–47	12
2024–25	Division 1									
2025–26	Division 1	6th out of 8	7	2	1	4	11	15	–4	7
2026–27	Division 1									
