= 2019 Inter Games Football Tournament =

Association football tournament in Anglesey

Tournament details
- Host country: Wales
- City: Anglesey
- Dates: 15–22 June 2019
- Teams: 10 (men's); 6 (women's)
- Venue: 8

Final positions
- Champions: Ynys Môn (men's); Isle of Man (women's)
- Runners-up: Guernsey (men's); Ynys Môn (women's)
- Third place: Isle of Man (men's); Jersey (women's)
- Fourth place: Shetland (men's); Hitra Municipality (women's)

The 2019 Inter Games Football Tournament was an association football tournament which was held between 15 and 22 June 2019 in Anglesey, Wales. It was organised due to the hosts of the 2019 Island Games, Gibraltar being unable to run a tournament due to lack of pitches. As football is one of the most popular sports at the games it was decided to hold the matches elsewhere, albeit with the results not officially part of the Island Games history.

It was announced on 1 May 2018 that the Welsh island had been chosen as the preferred venue to host. In August of that year 12 clubs put forward their names to hold matches and the draw for both the men's and women's competitions were made on 19 November by Wayne Hennessey and Osian Roberts. The sponsors of the games were Anglesey based Huws Gray builders merchants.

== Men's ==
The men's tournament will start as a group Round-robin tournament followed by knock out games.

=== Group stage ===
==== Group A ====
| Pos | Team | Pld | W | D | L | GF | GA | GD | Pts | Qualification |
|---|---|---|---|---|---|---|---|---|---|---|
| 1 | Ynys Môn (Q) | 3 | 3 | 0 | 0 | 6 | 2 | +4 | 9 | Advance to semi-finals |
| 2 | Jersey | 3 | 2 | 0 | 1 | 12 | 1 | +11 | 6 | |
| 3 | Orkney | 3 | 1 | 0 | 2 | 3 | 9 | −6 | 3 | |
| 4 | Western Isles | 3 | 0 | 0 | 3 | 2 | 11 | −9 | 0 | |

(Q) Qualified for the phase indicated

| 16 June 2019 | Jersey | 5–0 | Orkney | Llangefni |
| 11:00 | Lester 3', 15', 28', 42', 62' | | | Stadium: Bob Parry Field |

| 16 June 2019 | Ynys Môn | 2–1 | Western Isles | Holyhead |
| 17:00 | McGinness 55'; Morris 66' | | Shirkie 45' | Stadium: The New Stadium |

| 17 June 2019 | Ynys Môn | 3–1 | Orkney | Gwalchmai |
| 18:30 | Gibbs ?'; McGinness ?'; Jones ?' | | Delday ?' | Stadium: Maes Meurig |

| 17 June 2019 | Jersey | 7–0 | Western Isles | Bodorgan |
| 18:30 | Lester 12'; Nafkha ?'; Hinds ?'; Solomon ?', ?', ?', ?' | | | Stadium: Trefdraeth |

| 18 June 2019 | Ynys Môn | 1–0 | Jersey | Llangefni |
| 19:30 | Morris 8' | | | Stadium: Bob Parry Field; Attendance: 1126 |

| 18 June 2019 | Western Isles | 1–2 | Orkney | Cemaes Bay |
| 19:30 | Shirkie ?' | | ? ?' ? ?' | Stadium: School Lane |

==== Group B ====
| Pos | Team | Pld | W | D | L | GF | GA | GD | Pts | Qualification |
|---|---|---|---|---|---|---|---|---|---|---|
| 1 | Isle of Man (Q) | 2 | 2 | 0 | 0 | 13 | 2 | +11 | 6 | Advance to semi-finals |
| 2 | Hitra Municipality | 2 | 1 | 0 | 1 | 5 | 9 | −4 | 3 | |
| 3 | Alderney | 2 | 0 | 0 | 2 | 3 | 10 | −7 | 0 | |

(Q) Qualified for the phase indicated

| 16 June 2019 | Alderney | 2–4 | Hitra Municipality | Cemaes Bay |
| 19:30 | Goal | | Goal | Stadium: School Lane |

| 17 June 2019 | Isle of Man | 7–1 | Hitra Municipality | Llangefni |
| 18:30 | Whitley ?'; Kearns ?', ?'; Higginbotham ?', ?'; Jones ?'; Crook ?' | | Kristiansen ?' | Stadium: Bob Parry Field |

| 18 June 2019 | Isle of Man | 6–1 | Alderney | Llannerch-y-medd |
| 18:00 | Crook 9'; Gale 39', 62' (pen.); Doyle 40', 56'; Simpson 89' | | McCullouch ?' | Stadium: Tan Parc |

==== Group C ====
| Pos | Team | Pld | W | D | L | GF | GA | GD | Pts | Qualification |
|---|---|---|---|---|---|---|---|---|---|---|
| 1 | Guernsey (Q) | 2 | 2 | 0 | 0 | 11 | 1 | +10 | 6 | Advance to semi-finals |
| 2 | Shetland (Q) | 2 | 1 | 0 | 1 | 7 | 3 | +4 | 3 | Advance to semi-finals |
| 3 | Saint Helena | 2 | 0 | 0 | 2 | 1 | 15 | −14 | 0 | |

(Q) Qualified for the phase indicated

| 16 June 2019 | Saint Helena | 1–6 | Shetland | Bryn Du |
| 14:00 | Legg 32' | | Leask 10', 18'; Bradley 25'; Arthur 27', 46', 87' | Stadium: Cae Cynlas |

| 17 June 2019 | Guernsey | 2–1 | Shetland | Bodedern |
| 15:30 | Marsh 20'; Hall 44' | | Leask 54' (pen.) | Stadium: Cae Ty Cristion |

| 18 June 2019 | Guernsey | 9–0 | Saint Helena | Holyhead |
| 18:30 | Renouf ?'; Jardim ?', ?'; Fazakerley ?', ?', ?'; Loaring ?'; Hall ?'; Rodrihuez ?' | | | Stadium: The New Stadium |

==== Ranking of second-placed teams ====
Joining the three group winners in the semi-finals, the final semi-final slot is awarded to the best-ranked runner-up. As Group A contained one more team than the other groups, the result of the Group A runner-up against the Group A fourth-placed team is not taken into consideration. This was Jersey's 7–0 win over the Western Isles.

| Pos | Grp | Team | Pld | W | D | L | GF | GA | GD | Pts | Qualification |
|---|---|---|---|---|---|---|---|---|---|---|---|
| 1 | C | Shetland (Q) | 2 | 1 | 0 | 1 | 7 | 3 | +4 | 3 | Advance to semi-finals |
| 2 | A | Jersey | 2 | 1 | 0 | 1 | 5 | 1 | +4 | 3 | |
| 3 | B | Hitra Municipality | 2 | 1 | 0 | 1 | 5 | 9 | −4 | 3 | |

Rules for classification: 1) Points; 2) Goal difference; 3) Number of goals scored
(Q) Qualified for the phase indicated

=== Knock-out stage ===
==== 9th place play-off ====
| 20 June 2019 | Western Isles | 2–1 | Saint Helena | Bryn Du |
| 11:30 | Miller 2'; Shurkie 86' | | Benjamin 56' | Stadium: Cae Cynlas; Attendance: 138 |

==== 7th place play-off ====
| 20 June 2019 | Orkney | 1–2 | Alderney | Bodorgan |
| 13:00 | Rendall ?' | | McCullouch 44'; Blackham 87' | Stadium: Trefdraeth |

==== 5th place play-off ====
| 20 June 2019 | Jersey | 3–1 | Hitra Municipality | Bodedern |
| 14:00 | Giles 4'; Lester 20'; Trotter 82' | | Kvakland 55' | Stadium: Cae Ty Cristion |

==== Semi-finals ====
| 20 June 2019 | Ynys Môn | 2–1 | Shetland | Llangefni |
| 19:30 | Jones 9', 42' | | Grant 58' | Stadium: Bob Parry Field; Attendance: 1506 |

| 20 June 2019 | Isle of Man | 2–3 | Guernsey | Gwalchmai |
| 16:30 | Oates 52'; Bass 70' | | Fazakerley ?'; Loaring ?', 84' | Stadium: Maes Meurig; Attendance: 276 |

==== Bronze medal play-off ====
| 21 June 2019 | Shetland | 0–5 | Isle of Man | Gwalchmai |
| 14:00 | | | Oates 24', 75', 78' ? 71' (o.g.); Simpson 76' | Stadium: Maes Meurig |

==== Final ====
| 21 June 2019 | Ynys Môn | 2–1 | Guernsey | Holyhead |
| 18:30 | Morris 67'; McGinness 83' | | Marsh 5' | Stadium: The New Stadium; Attendance: 3020 |

=== Final rankings ===
| Rank | Team |
|---|---|
| Gold medal | Ynys Môn |
| Silver medal | Guernsey |
| Bronze medal | Isle of Man |
| 4 | Shetland |
| 5 | Jersey |
| 6 | Hitra Municipality |
| 7 | Alderney |
| 8 | Orkney |
| 9 | Western Isles |
| 10 | Saint Helena |

== Women's ==
The women's tournament will be two groups of three teams. There were originally to be five teams in one group but on 8 February 2019 it was confirmed that Gibraltar would take part as an additional entrant.

=== Group stage ===
==== Group A ====
| Pos | Team | Pld | W | D | L | GF | GA | GD | Pts | Qualification |
|---|---|---|---|---|---|---|---|---|---|---|
| 1 | Ynys Môn (Q) | 2 | 1 | 0 | 1 | 5 | 4 | +1 | 3 | Advance to semi-finals |
| 2 | Hitra Municipality | 2 | 1 | 0 | 1 | 3 | 3 | 0 | 3 | Advance to semi-finals |
| 3 | Western Isles | 2 | 1 | 0 | 1 | 2 | 3 | −1 | 3 | |

(Q) Qualified for the phase indicated

| 16 June 2019 | Ynys Môn | 3–1 | Western Isles |
| 13:30 | Crawley 5', 65', 90' | | Macleod 60' |

| 17 June 2019 | Ynys Môn | 2–3 | Hitra Municipality |
| 18:30 | Crawley ?'; Greenough ?' | | Jorgenson ?', 25'; Selvag ?' |

| 18 June 2019 | Western Isles | 1–0 | Hitra Municipality |
| | Macleod ?' |

==== Group B ====
| Pos | Team | Pld | W | D | L | GF | GA | GD | Pts | Qualification |
|---|---|---|---|---|---|---|---|---|---|---|
| 1 | Isle of Man (Q) | 2 | 2 | 0 | 0 | 5 | 3 | +2 | 6 | Advance to semi-finals |
| 2 | Jersey | 2 | 1 | 0 | 1 | 8 | 5 | +3 | 3 | Advance to semi-finals |
| 3 | Gibraltar | 2 | 0 | 0 | 2 | 3 | 8 | −5 | 0 | |

(Q) Qualified for the phase indicated

| 16 June 2019 | Isle of Man | 3–2 | Jersey |
| 13:30 | Gawne 19' (pen.); Abbott ?'; Wignall ?' | | Botterill ?'; Corbett 70' |

| 17 June 2019 | Isle of Man | 2–1 | Gibraltar |
| 18:00 | Hicklin ?'; Wignall ?' | | Robba ?' |

| 18 June 2019 | Jersey | 6–2 | Gibraltar |
| 18:30 | Wood 1', 45'; Keen 39'; Botterill 54'; Watson ?'; Corbett ?' | | Robba 7' ?' |

=== Knock-out stage ===
==== 5th place play-off ====
| 19 June 2019 | Western Isles | 5–0 | Gibraltar |
| 17:30 | Macleod 46'; Macphail 49'; Lee ?'; Macleod ?'; Stewart ?' |

==== Semi-finals ====
| 19 June 2019 | Ynys Môn | 1–0 | Jersey |
| 18:30 | Crawley ?' |

| 19 June 2019 | Isle of Man | 5–1 | Hitra Municipality |
| 18:00 | Corkish ?'; Gawne ?'; Burden ?'; Hallsall ?'; Wignall ?' | | Jorgenson ?' |

==== Bronze medal play-off ====
| 21 June 2019 | Jersey | 3–2 (a.e.t.) | Hitra Municipality | Amlwch |
| 11:30 | Barnett 47' (pen.); Wood 90+1'; Watson ?' | | Antonsen 34'; Jorgenson 87' (pen.) | Stadium: Lôn Bach |

==== Final ====
| 21 June 2019 | Ynys Môn | 1–2 | Isle of Man | Holyhead |
| 15:30 | Evans 69' | | Wignall 3'; Gawne 38' | Stadium: The New Stadium |

=== Final rankings ===
| Rank | Team |
|---|---|
| Gold medal | Isle of Man |
| Silver medal | Ynys Môn |
| Bronze medal | Jersey |
| 4 | Hitra Municipality |
| 5 | Western Isles |
| 6 | Gibraltar |
