= Muratti Vase =

Annual football competition in the Channel Islands

- Founded: 1905
- Teams: 3
- Current champions: Guernsey
- Most championships: Jersey (57 titles)

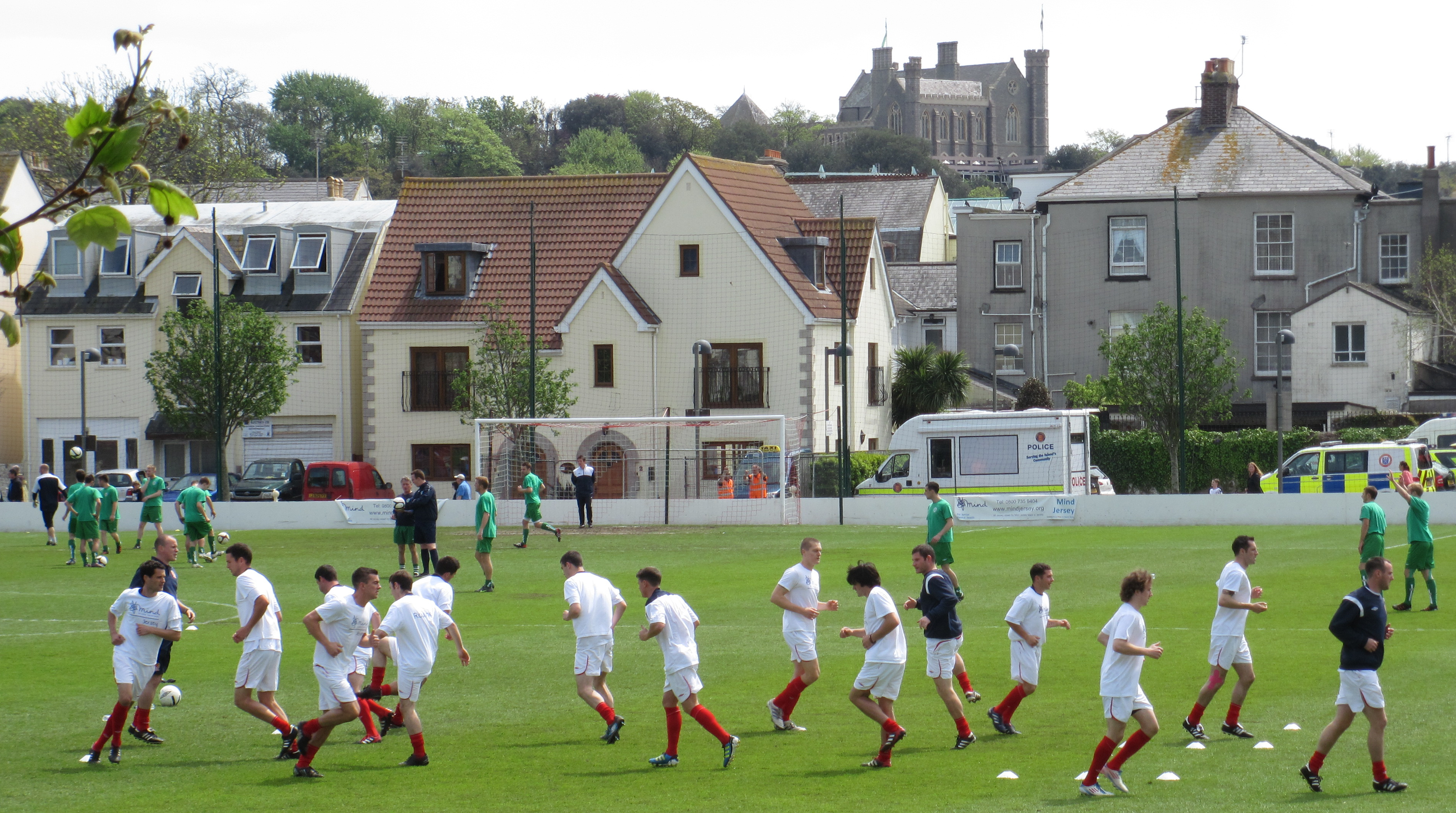
The Jersey and Guernsey teams warming up before the 2012 final

The Muratti Vase is an annual men's and women's football competition, inaugurated in 1905, between teams representing the Channel Islands of Alderney, Guernsey and Jersey. The larger islands of Guernsey and Jersey dominate the competition, with Alderney's sole match final championship victory – and sole victory in any tournament fixture – occurring in 1920.

== History ==
Since its inception, the competition has been interrupted only between 1915–1919, 1940–1946 and 2020-2021 due to the First and Second World Wars and the COVID-19 pandemic. The teams wear their island colours of green and white (Guernsey), red and white (Jersey), and blue and white (Alderney). The competition is sponsored by Hepburns Insurance and now includes Ladies', under 21s and an under 18s competition for men.

The tournament consists of a semi-final and a final. Before the Second World War the draw for the semi-final rotated between the three islands, but since then Jersey and Guernsey have taken turns to play Alderney in the semi.

The Final is played on alternate years in Guernsey and Jersey. When in Guernsey it is played at either Footes Lane or The Track for a number of years and in Jersey at Springfield Stadium.

The first Muratti final took place at Springfield on 27 April 1905, but after two years the venue for Muratti matches in Jersey moved to Westmount until 1923 when Springfield became host in alternate years. Since 1930 Muratti matches in Jersey have been regularly held at Springfield with few exceptions.

Up until 2005 a drawn final would be replayed. Seven finals were decided on a replay. Since 2006, the game has been decided on the day and three matches have gone to extra time since then, with all these matches being decided on a penalty shoot-out.

2016 saw Jersey host the 100th final.

== Participants ==
Alderney
- Home stadium: Arsenal Ground
First colours

Guernsey
- Home stadium: Footes Lane
First colours

Jersey
- Home stadium: Springfield Stadium
First colours

== Venues ==
The tournament is hosted in three venues:

Muratti Vase (Channel Islands)

Saint Anne	Saint Peter Port	Saint Helier
Arsenal Ground	Footes Lane	Springfield Stadium
Capacity: 1,500	Capacity: 5,000	Capacity: 7,000

== Results ==
A full list of Muratti results. Home team listed first unless noted.

Key to colours
Competition won by Alderney
Competition won by Guernsey
Competition won by Jersey

Year	Final			Semi-final			Notes	No
1905	Jersey	0–1	Guernsey	Guernsey	6–0	Alderney		1
1906	Guernsey	1–0	Alderney	Jersey	1–2	Guernsey		2
1907	Jersey	2–3	Guernsey	Alderney	1–2	Jersey	(Note: Semi-final in Guernsey)	3
1908	Guernsey	0–4	Jersey	Guernsey	3–0	Alderney	(Note: Semi-final in Jersey)	4
1909	Guernsey	2–0	Alderney	Guernsey	3–0	Jersey	(Note: Final in Jersey)	5
1910	Guernsey	2–3	Jersey	Jersey	7–1	Alderney		6
1911	Jersey	4–1	Guernsey	Guernsey	2–1	Alderney		7
1912	Guernsey	4–0	Alderney	Jersey	2–5	Guernsey	(Note: Semi-final replayed after a 3 – 3 draw)	8
1913	Jersey	2–4	Guernsey	Jersey	5–2	Alderney		9
1914	Guernsey	2–1	Jersey	Alderney	0–4	Guernsey		10
1915	Competition suspended due to First World War							
1916	Competition suspended due to First World War							
1917	Competition suspended due to First World War							
1918	Competition suspended due to First World War							
1919	Competition suspended due to First World War							
1920	Alderney	1–0	Guernsey	Guernsey	1–0	Jersey		11
1921	Guernsey	0–1	Jersey	Jersey	2–0	Alderney		12
1922	Jersey	1–2	Guernsey	Guernsey	8–0	Alderney		13
1923	Guernsey	3–2	Alderney	Jersey	0–1	Guernsey		14
1924	Jersey	1–0	Guernsey	Jersey	1–0	Alderney		15
1925	Guernsey	2–1	Jersey	Alderney	0–3	Guernsey		16
1926	Jersey	7–1	Alderney	Guernsey	1–5	Jersey		17
1927	Guernsey	1–0	Jersey	Jersey	3–0	Alderney		18
1928	Jersey	2–1	Guernsey	Guernsey	4–0	Alderney		19
1929	Guernsey	5–0	Alderney	Jersey	1–7	Guernsey		20
1930	Jersey	2–3	Guernsey	Jersey	3–2	Alderney		21
1931	Guernsey	2–4	Jersey	Alderney	0–1	Guernsey		22
1932	Alderney	2–4	Guernsey	Guernsey	2–0	Jersey		23
1933	Guernsey	4–1	Jersey	Jersey	6–0	Alderney		24
1934	Jersey	0–1	Guernsey	Guernsey	3–0	Alderney		25
1935	Guernsey	5–0	Alderney	Jersey	0–1	Guernsey		26
1936	Guernsey	2–1	Jersey	Jersey	9–0	Alderney		27
1937	Guernsey	3–3	Jersey	Guernsey	4–1	Alderney	(Note: Guernsey & Jersey shared title)	28
1938	Guernsey	3–1	Alderney	Guernsey	4–3	Jersey		29
1939	Guernsey	0–1	Jersey	Jersey	2–1	Alderney		30
1940	Competition suspended due to Second World War and German occupation of the Channel Islands							
1941	Competition suspended due to Second World War and German occupation of the Channel Islands							
1942	Competition suspended due to Second World War and German occupation of the Channel Islands							
1943	Competition suspended due to Second World War and German occupation of the Channel Islands							
1944	Competition suspended due to Second World War and German occupation of the Channel Islands							
1945	Competition suspended due to Second World War and German occupation of the Channel Islands							
1946	Competition suspended due to Second World War and German occupation of the Channel Islands							
1947	Guernsey	1–3	Jersey				(Note: No semi-final – Alderney withdrew)	31
1948	Jersey	6–3	Guernsey	Guernsey	3–0	Alderney		32
1949	Guernsey	1–2	Jersey	Jersey	9–0	Alderney		33
1950	Jersey	0–2	Guernsey	Guernsey	3–1	Alderney		34
1951	Guernsey	3–1	Jersey	Jersey	8–1	Alderney		35
1952	Jersey	1–3	Guernsey	Guernsey	7–2	Alderney		36
1953	Guernsey	0–2	Jersey	Jersey	4–0	Alderney		37
1954	Jersey	3–5	Guernsey	Guernsey	2–1	Alderney		38
1955	Jersey	1–0	Guernsey	Jersey	3–0	Alderney	(Note: Final replayed after a 0 – 0 draw)	39
1956	Jersey	2–1	Guernsey	Guernsey	4–0	Alderney		40
1957	Guernsey	6–4	Jersey	Jersey	7–1	Alderney		41
1958	Jersey	2–1	Guernsey	Guernsey	8–2	Alderney		42
1959	Guernsey	2–3	Jersey	Jersey	6–0	Alderney		43
1960	Jersey	5–1	Guernsey	Guernsey	5–1	Alderney		44
1961	Guernsey	1–2	Jersey	Jersey	4–2	Alderney		45
1962	Jersey	3–1	Guernsey	Guernsey	6–1	Alderney		46
1963	Guernsey	1–4	Jersey	Jersey	6–0	Alderney		47
1964	Jersey	1–0	Guernsey	Guernsey	3–0	Alderney		48
1965	Guernsey	2–4	Jersey	Jersey	8–0	Alderney		49
1966	Guernsey	3–1	Jersey	Guernsey	10–0	Alderney	(Note: Final replayed after a 1 – 1 draw)	50
1967	Guernsey	1–3	Jersey	Jersey	3–1	Alderney		51
1968	Jersey	2–1	Guernsey	Guernsey	2–0	Alderney		52
1969	Guernsey	2–1	Jersey	Jersey	5–0	Alderney		53
1970	Jersey	2–0	Guernsey	Guernsey	5–0	Alderney		54
1971	Guernsey	0–1	Jersey	Jersey	11–0	Alderney		55
1972	Jersey	0–3	Guernsey	Guernsey	5–0	Alderney		56
1973	Guernsey	1–4	Jersey	Jersey	6–1	Alderney		57
1974	Jersey	1–2	Guernsey	Guernsey	6–0	Alderney		58
1975	Jersey	2–3	Guernsey	Jersey	3–1	Alderney	(Note: Final replayed after a 2 – 2 draw)	59
1976	Jersey	3–1	Guernsey	Alderney	0–5	Guernsey		60
1977	Guernsey	1–5	Jersey	Alderney	0–3	Jersey		61
1978	Jersey	0–2	Guernsey	Guernsey	12–0	Alderney		62
1979	Guernsey	5–0	Jersey	Jersey	8–0	Alderney		63
1980	Jersey	1–2	Guernsey	Alderney	0–5	Guernsey		64
1981	Guernsey	1–4	Jersey	Alderney	0–5	Jersey		65
1982	Jersey	2–1	Guernsey	Guernsey	6–1	Alderney		66
1983	Guernsey	2–1	Jersey	Jersey	6–1	Alderney		67
1984	Jersey	6–2	Guernsey	Alderney	0–6	Guernsey		68
1985	Guernsey	4–3	Jersey	Alderney	0–5	Jersey		69
1986	Jersey	3–2	Guernsey	Guernsey	7–0	Alderney		70
1987	Guernsey	3–4	Jersey	Jersey	10–0	Alderney		71
1988	Jersey	0–1	Guernsey	Alderney	1–5	Guernsey		72
1989	Guernsey	0–4	Jersey	Alderney	0–4	Jersey		73
1990	Jersey	2–1	Guernsey	Guernsey	4–0	Alderney		74
1991	Guernsey	3–0	Jersey	Alderney	1–4	Jersey		75
1992	Jersey	2–3	Guernsey	Guernsey	9–1	Alderney		76
1993	Guernsey	1–2	Jersey	Alderney	0–10	Guernsey		77
1994	Jersey	3–1	Guernsey	Jersey	18–0	Alderney		78
1995	Guernsey	1–2	Jersey	Alderney	1–3	Jersey		79
1996	Guernsey	0–1	Jersey	Alderney	0–2	Guernsey		80
1997	Guernsey	2–1	Jersey	Alderney	0–6	Guernsey		81
1998	Jersey	2–0	Guernsey	Alderney	0–2	Jersey		82
1999	Guernsey	2–0	Jersey	Alderney	0–1	Guernsey		83
2000	Jersey	1–0	Guernsey	Alderney	0–10	Jersey		84
2001	Guernsey	4–1	Jersey	Alderney	0–6	Guernsey		85
2002	Jersey	2–1	Guernsey	Alderney	1–2	Jersey		86
2003	Jersey	1–0	Guernsey	Alderney	1–4	Guernsey	(Note: Final replayed after a 3 – 3 draw)	87
2004	Jersey	3–0	Guernsey	Alderney	0–4	Jersey		88
2005	Jersey	3–3	Guernsey	Alderney	1–2	Guernsey	(Note: Final replayed after a 0 – 0 draw; Guernsey won replay on penalties)	89
2006	Jersey	3–2	Guernsey	Alderney	1–4	Jersey		90
2007	Guernsey	0–0	Jersey	Alderney	1–4	Guernsey	(Note: Jersey won final on penalties)	91
2008	Jersey	1–1	Guernsey	Alderney	0–7	Jersey		92
2009	Guernsey	0–1	Jersey	Alderney	0–5	Guernsey		93
2010	Jersey	0–1	Guernsey	Alderney	0–3	Jersey		94
2011	Guernsey	1–1	Jersey	Alderney	0–5	Guernsey		95
2012	Jersey	0–2	Guernsey	Alderney	0–7	Guernsey		96
2013	Guernsey	2–1	Jersey	Alderney	2–9	Jersey		97
2014	Jersey	1–4	Guernsey	Alderney	0–4	Guernsey		98
2015	Guernsey	2–3	Jersey	Alderney	0–5	Jersey		99
2016	Jersey	1–0	Guernsey	Alderney	0–1	Guernsey		100
2017	Guernsey	2–1	Jersey	Alderney	1–2	Jersey		101
2018	Jersey	1–0	Guernsey	Alderney	0–2	Guernsey		102
2019	Guernsey	0–0	Jersey	Alderney	0–2	Jersey		103
2020	Competition suspended due to the COVID-19 pandemic							
2021	Competition suspended due to the COVID-19 pandemic							
2022	Jersey	1–0	Guernsey	Alderney	0–2	Guernsey		104
2023	Guernsey	1–2	Jersey	Alderney	1–6	Jersey		105
2024	Jersey	3–2	Guernsey	Alderney	1–4	Guernsey		106
2025	Guernsey	3–1	Jersey	Alderney	0–2	Jersey		107
2026	Jersey	1-2	Guernsey	Alderney	1-2	Guernsey		108

== Winners by Island ==
Island	Winners
Jersey	57 (plus one shared with Guernsey in 1937)
Guernsey	48 (plus one shared with Jersey in 1937)
Alderney	1

updated to 2026

== Records ==
Jersey hold the record for longest run as champions, having held the title for eight years between 1958 and 1965.

Guernsey's longest unbeaten run was a stretch of five finals between 1932 and 1936. They were prevented a sixth straight win by a tie in 1937, the only year the title has been shared. Guernsey won it in 1938 meaning they held the trophy for seven years, albeit one of those shared.

Alderney have not won a match in the competition since 1920 despite some very close performances in recent years.

- The biggest victory margin is an 18–0 win by Jersey over Alderney in the 1994 semi-final.
- The biggest victory margin in a final was 7–1 in 1926 when Jersey beat Alderney.
- The highest scoring final was in 1957 when Guernsey beat Jersey 6–4.

== Change of name ==
It was reported in March 2009 that the name of the competition would have to be changed due to proposed legislative restrictions on tobacco advertising in Jersey. Although the Muratti brand of cigarettes is not sold in Jersey, the name of the tobacco manufacturer linked to the name of the trophy would fall within the ban on promotion of brands.

== Youth Tournaments ==
=== U-11 ===
Results

Year	Home	Result	Away
1994	Jersey	7–1	Guernsey
1995	Guernsey	0–1	Jersey
1996	Jersey	2–1	Guernsey
1997	Guernsey	3–0	Jersey
1998	Jersey	3–3	Guernsey
1999	Guernsey	0–6	Jersey
2000	Jersey	1–3	Guernsey
2001	Guernsey	1–0	Jersey
2002	Jersey	2–1	Guernsey
2003	Guernsey	2–1	Jersey
2004	Jersey	5–0	Guernsey
2005	Jersey	6–2	Guernsey
2006	Jersey	0–0	Guernsey
2007	Guernsey	0–4	Jersey
2008	Jersey	5–0	Guernsey
2009	Guernsey	2–2	Jersey
2010–2019 not played
2017	Guernsey	0–9	Jersey
2018	Jersey	1–0	Guernsey
2019	Guernsey	3–4	Jersey
2020	Jersey	2–3	Guernsey
2021– not played

=== Star Trophy (U-15) ===
Results

=== Nigel Gavey Memorial Trophy (U-16) ===
Guernsey and Jersey under 16 men's team have competed in their own Muratti Cup since 2007. In 2018, female player Maya Le Tissier made her debut for the Guernsey team in the Muratti Cup, being the first female player to play for any Guernsey men's team. This was in light of the Guernsey women's team being disbanded the previous year.

Results

Year	Hosts	Winners	Results	Runners-up
2007	Guernsey	Jersey	1–0	Guernsey
2008	Jersey	Jersey	3–0	Guernsey
2009	Guernsey	Jersey	1–0	Guernsey
2010	Jersey	Jersey	2–0	Guernsey
2011	Guernsey	Guernsey	2–1	Jersey
2012	Jersey	Guernsey	3–1	Jersey
2013	Guernsey	Guernsey	3–1	Jersey
2014	Jersey	Jersey	4–1	Guernsey
2015	Guernsey	Jersey	1–1	Guernsey
2016	Jersey	Jersey	4–0	Guernsey
2017	Guernsey	Guernsey	1–0	Jersey
2018	Jersey	Jersey	2–1	Guernsey
2019	Guernsey	Jersey	5–4	Guernsey
2020–2021	Cancelled due to the COVID-19 pandemic			
2022	Jersey	Jersey	3–0	Guernsey
2023	Guernsey	Jersey	2–1	Guernsey
2024	Jersey	Jersey	5–1	Guernsey
2025	Jersey	Guernsey	4-2	Jersey
2026	Guernsey	Jersey	5-0	Guernsey

=== London Channel Islanders Society Trophy (U-18 - Junior Muratti) ===
Results

=== Hotel Ambassadeur Bowl (U-21) ===
Results

== Women's tournament ==
The Ladies Muratti is the women's equivalent of the tournament. It's played for the Norman Piette Trophy. Unlike the men's version, the women's competition is a one off match between Jersey and Guernsey only. The competition ran from its inception in 1997 to 2017 when the Guernsey women's team was disbanded. The tournament restarted in 2022.

=== Results ===
Key to colours
Competition won by Guernsey
Competition won by Jersey

Year	Hosts	Winners	Results	Runners-up	No
1997	Guernsey	Guernsey	3–0	Jersey	1
1998	Jersey	Guernsey	2–0	Jersey	2
1999	Guernsey	Guernsey	3–1	Jersey	3
2000	Jersey	Guernsey	1–0	Jersey	4
2001	Guernsey	Guernsey	2–1	Jersey	5
2002	Jersey	Jersey	1–0	Guernsey	6
2003	Guernsey	Jersey	3–2	Guernsey	7
2004	Jersey	Jersey	4–1	Guernsey	8
2005	Guernsey	Jersey	5–1	Guernsey	9
2006	Jersey	Jersey	1–0	Guernsey	10
2007	Guernsey	Jersey	3–0	Guernsey	11
2008	Jersey	Guernsey	1–0	Jersey	12
2009	Guernsey	Jersey	1–0	Guernsey	13
2010	Jersey	Jersey	8–0	Guernsey	14
2011	Guernsey	Jersey	6–2	Guernsey	15
2012	Jersey	Jersey	1–0	Guernsey	16
2013	Guernsey	Jersey	3–0	Guernsey	17
2014	Jersey	Jersey	5–1	Guernsey	18
2015	Guernsey	Jersey	7–0	Guernsey	19
2016	Jersey	Jersey	9–0	Guernsey	20
2017	Competition suspended due to the absence of a women's team for Guernsey				
2018	Competition suspended due to the absence of a women's team for Guernsey				
2019	Competition suspended due to the absence of a women's team for Guernsey				
2010	Competition suspended due to the absence of a women's team for Guernsey				
2021	Competition suspended due to the absence of a women's team for Guernsey				
2022	Jersey	Jersey	5–0	Guernsey	21
2023	Guernsey	Jersey	4–1	Guernsey	22
2024	Jersey	Guernsey	2–0	Jersey	23
2025	Guernsey	Guernsey	2–1	Jersey	24

== See also ==
- Alderney national football team
- Guernsey national football team
- Jersey national football team
- Upton Park Trophy
- Inter-insular match – the equivalent event in cricket
- Siam Cup – the equivalent event in rugby union
