= Ne-Jai Tucker =

Bermudan footballer

Personal information
- Date of birth: 20 August 2002 (age 24)
- Position: Midfielder

Youth career
- North Village Rams
- ABC Valencia
- Manchester City
- –2023: Burnley

Senior career*
Years	Team	Apps	(Gls)
2024–2025	St. George's		
2025–2026	Southport	2	(0)
2025–2026	→ Workington (loan)		
2026	Walton & Hersham	7	(0)

International career^{‡}
2019	Bermuda U-17	3	(0)
2020	Bermuda U-20	3	(0)
2023	Bermuda U-23	4	(1)
2023–	Bermuda	27	(2)
- * Club domestic league appearances and goals as of 09:41, 7 October 2026 (UTC) ‡ National team caps and goals as of 09:41, 7 October 2026 (UTC)

Ne-Jai Tucker (born 20 August 2002) is a Bermudan footballer who last played as a midfielder for National League South club Walton & Hersham. He is a full Bermuda international.

== Early life ==
From the age of four years-old Tucker played football for North Village Rams and ABC Valencia on the island of Bermuda. At the age of eleven he moved with his family to the United Kingdom. He spent a couple of years in the Manchester City academy before being scouted playing football near Manchester for Urmston Sports Club in May 2016, and was invited to trial for Burnley, and played for the Burnley under-15s at Turf Moor the following day.

== Club career ==
In July 2021 Tucker signed his first professional contract with Burnley. In September 2021 Tucker scored his first goal for the Burnley under-23 team in Premier League 2 against Southampton under-23s at St Mary's Stadium. Tucker's contract was due to expire at the end of the season, but Burnley announced they had activated the option for a further year in June 2022. Tucker was personally name checked by new Burnley manager Vincent Kompany as a youngster that had impressed him during pre-season training in July 2022. He was released by Burnley at the end of the 2022–23 season.

In July 2025, Tucker returned to England, joining National League North club Southport on an initial one-year deal having impressed the club's management whilst on trial.

On 17 July 2026, Tucker agreed to join newly-promoted National League South side, Walton & Hersham following his departure from Southport.

== International career ==
Tucker is a Bermuda international. He represented the Bermuda national under-20 football team in 2020 CONCACAF U-20 Championship qualifying matches. He scored for Bermuda U23s at the 2023 Island Games, held in Guernsey.

He made his senior debut for Bermuda on 12 September 2023 in the CONCACAF Nations League against Saint Vincent and the Grenadines national football team. He scored his first international goal on 17 November 2023 against Saint Vincent and the Grenadines national football team.
