= Muratti (cigarette) =

Cigarette brand

- Pack of Muratti Ambassador cigarettes
- Product type: Cigarette
- Current owner: Philip Morris International; British American Tobacco (Germany only)
- Produced by: Philip Morris International; British American Tobacco (Germany only)
- Country: United Kingdom/German Empire
- Introduced: 1821; 205 years ago
- Markets: See Markets
- Previous owners: "U.K. Tobacco Company", "Godfrey Phillips"

Muratti is a brand of cigarettes, currently owned and manufactured by Philip Morris International. Several Muratti variants have been introduced over the years and were also sold as Ambassador, Ariston, Cabinet, Gentry, Iplic, Peer and Regent.

== History ==
The company was founded in Istanbul by Greek tobacco trader Basil Muratoglu, in 1821. He moved the company to Western Europe in the 1880s, after the Ottoman Empire monopolized the tobacco industry—in 1885 the company was established in Berlin, Germany, and in 1887 in London, Great Britain.

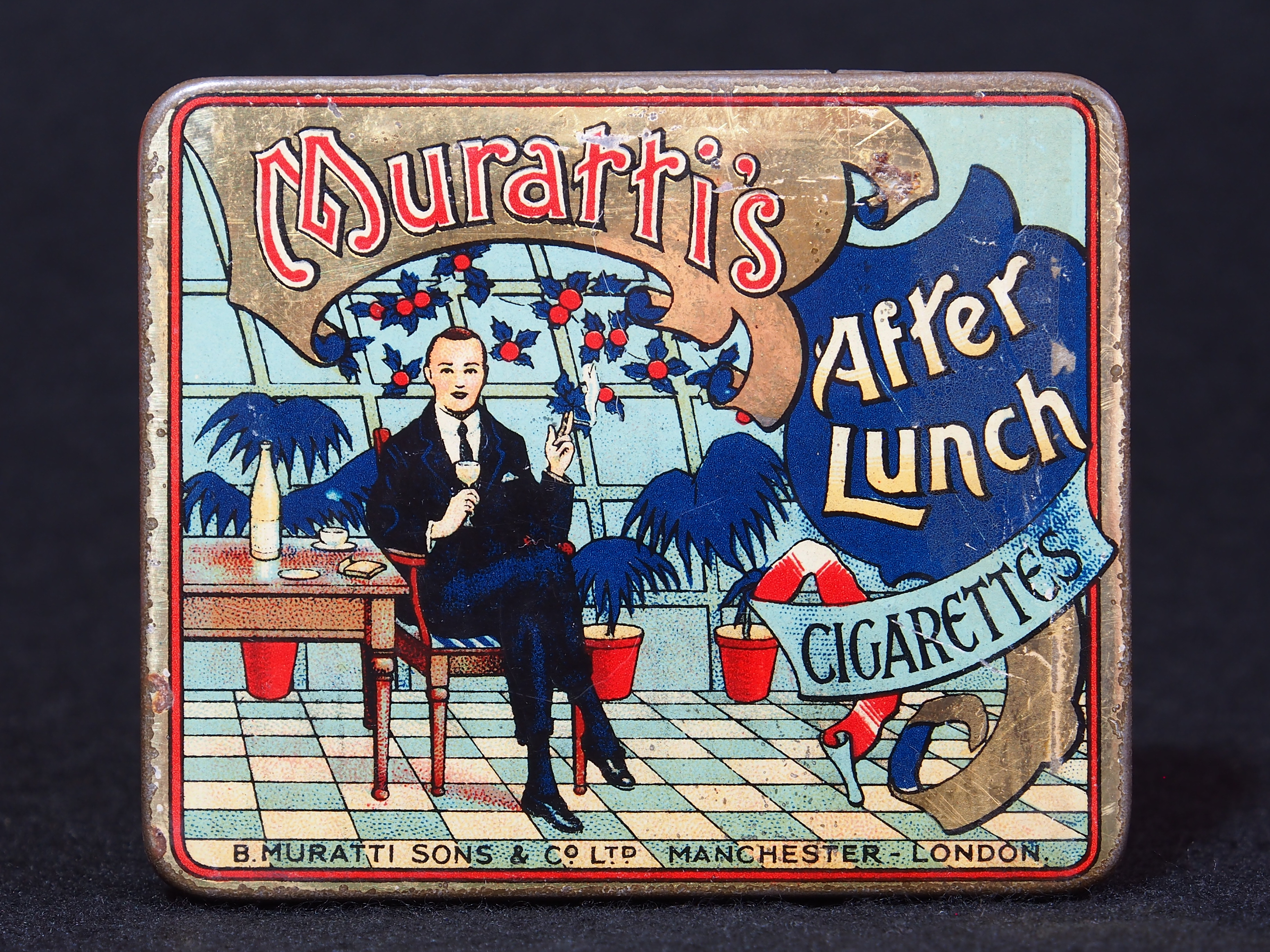
Muratti After Lunch cigarette tin

Until 1939, the German army administration seized the entire production site in Köpenicker Straße. Muratti had to move to commander road number 20. Three years later, however, the Nazis completely shut down the factory, and at the end of the war, all the tobacco in the city was consumed. The Berliners were lining up for a pack of "Sondermischung", and on the black market a stick of American cigarettes cost 1,000 Reichsmarks.

The English company ended up under Philip Morris International. The German brand was bought by Martin Brinkmann in 1960, and now belongs to British American Tobacco.

Muratti cigarettes are sold in three varieties, Rosso, Chiaro and Zaffiro, all packaged in pichular packaging and featuring a slim profile.

In November 1991, cigarettes which were "too strong" for the Italian market were to be banned in the coming months, and all cigarette brands were to be lowered in tar and nicotine. A Muratti Ariston Filter cigarette contained 14 mg of tar at the time.

In December 1991, the distribution of the brands Marlboro, Merit and Muratti were suspended in Italy for one month due to problems with counterfeit cigarettes.

In February 1992, a third tax in 14 months was put on cigarettes in Italy, increasing the price of cigarettes by 50 or 100 Lira. A pack of Muratti Ambassador cost 3550 Lira at the time.

In January 2016, cigarette prices in Italy went up by 20 cents, and a pack of Muratti Ambassador Blu went from €5,20 to €5,40. As of May 2023, the price of one pack of Muratti Ambassador is €6,20, regardless of the variety.

== Advertisement ==
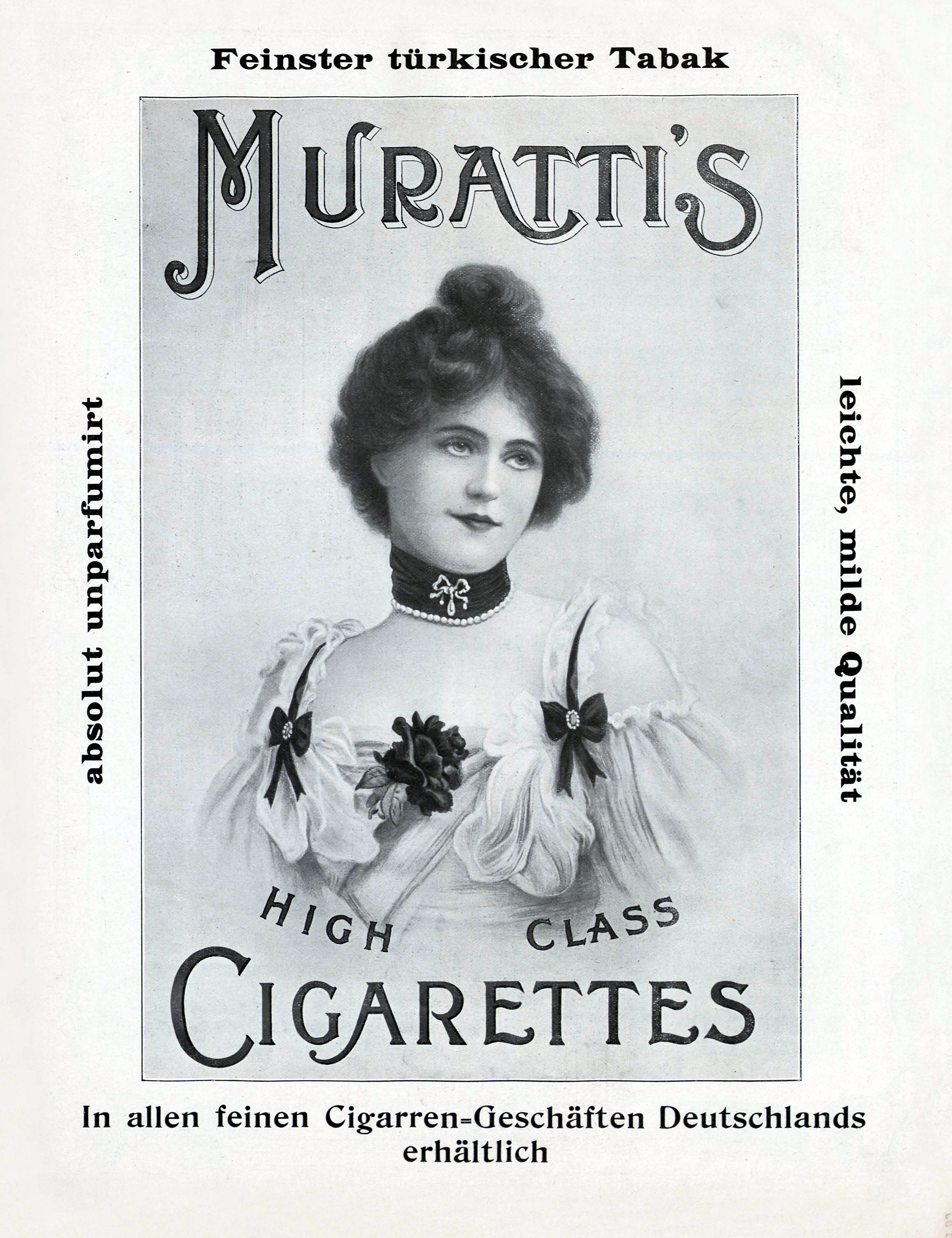
Ad for Muratti cigarettes in a German magazine (1902)

Various poster, billboard and magazine advertisements have been made to promote Muratti, both before and after World War II. The ones made after the war were especially promoting the "Charcoal multifilter" it had.

A film ad was also made in 1935.

A special set of cigarette cards were made for the 1936 Summer Olympics. They were given when you bought a pack of Muratti cigarettes.

In the 1980s, Philip Morris made a few posters and even a TV spot, and teamed up with the watch manufacturer Quartz to produce a watch called "Muratti Time".

In 1985, Muratti sponsored a concert of Paolo Conte in Bologna.

== Sport sponsorship ==
=== Rally ===
Muratti sponsored an Italian rally event that was held in Gennargentu, Sardinia in June 1983 and 1984 called the "Muratti Adventure". In total, the rally consisted of five stages, seven special stages, plus six special sectors (in practice other special speed tests) for a total of 1,020 km. In this rally, the contestants had to drive from the eastern to the western part of Gennargentu, dubbing it as "the toughest rally race ever held in Italy".

=== Football ===
In 1905 the brand sponsored a football cup, named the Muratti Vase, being an annual competition between Alderney, Guernsey and Jersey.

== Markets ==
Muratti (that includes all the other, older variants) was or still is sold in the following countries: United States, United Kingdom, Luxembourg, Germany, France, Switzerland, Austria, Bulgaria, Italy, Czechoslovakia, Slovenia, Croatia, Greece, Turkey, Latvia, Ukraine, Russia, Kazakhstan and India.

== See also ==
- Tobacco smoking
