= Arsenal Ground =

Sports ground in Alderney, Channel Islands

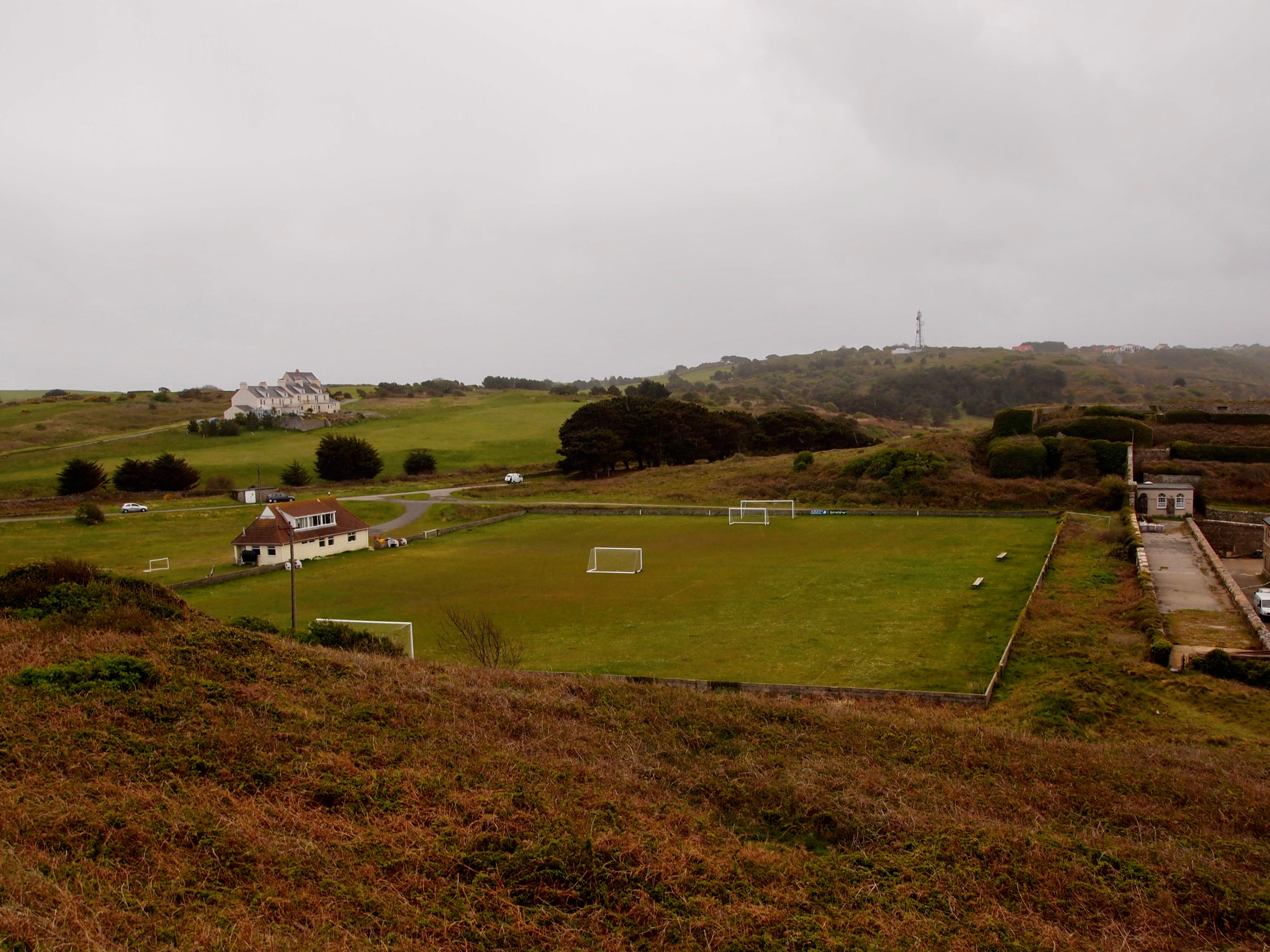
- Interactive map of Arsenal Ground
- Full name: The Arsenal
- Location: Saint Anne, Alderney
- Coordinates: 49°43′25″N 2°11′00″W
- Capacity: 1,500
- Surface: Grass

Tenants
- Alderney F.C. Alderney official football team

The Arsenal Ground is a multipurpose sports ground located in the town of Saint Anne, in Alderney (in the Channel Islands). This field is mostly used for football matches, and currently, the Alderney official football team and Alderney F.C. host their games at The Arsenal, both for Muratti Vase, or the Guernsey Priaulx League.This stadium has a maximum capacity of up to 1,500 people.
