= Enrique Russell =

Bermudian footballer

Personal information
- Full name: Tokia Enrique Zidane Russell Jr
- Date of birth: 5 February 2000 (age 26)
- Place of birth: Warwick, Bermuda
- Height: 1.85 m (6 ft 1 in)
- Position: Forward

Team information
- Current team: PHC Zebras

Youth career
- 2006–2013: PHC Zebras
- 2013–2015: Cornellà
- 2015–2016: PHC Zebras
- 2016–2017: Ilkeston Town
- 2017–2018: AFC Bournemouth

Senior career*
Years	Team	Apps	(Gls)
2018–2019	Cheadle Town		
2019–2022	PHC Zebras		
2022–2023	AFC Totton		
2022	→ Totton & Eling (loan)	7	(4)
2022–2023	→ Brockenhurst (loan)	18	(1)
2023–	PHC Zebras		

International career^{‡}
- Bermuda U17
- Bermuda U20
2023	Bermuda U23	5	(4)
2021–	Bermuda	15	(5)
- * Club domestic league appearances and goals as of 11:21, 16 March 2023 (UTC) ‡ National team caps and goals as of 08:58, 2 June 2025 (UTC)

Tokia Enrique Zidane Russell Jr (born 5 February 2000) is a Bermudian footballer who plays as a forward for PHC Zebras and the Bermuda national team.

== Club career ==
Growing up, Russell had a two-year spell living in Spain that included a trial with Barcelona. During that time, he also played for the Cornellà academy alongside compatriate Kane Crichlow. In 2017, he joined Ilkeston Town. Later that year, he remained in England to study at Sparsholt College and played for the AFC Bournemouth academy. After returning from injury, he joined Cheadle Town before once again returning to play for PHC Zebras. In August 2022, he joined Southern League Division One South side AFC Totton and spent time on loan at Totton & Eling. Later in the year, he was on loan at fellow Wessex League side Brockenhurst and scored a hat-trick in a cup match against Romsey Town. He rejoined PHC Zebras the following season and was part of the squad which lifted the Bermudian Premier Division title.

== International career ==
Russell made his debut for Bermuda in March 2021, scoring in a 3–0 friendly win over the Bahamas. He was a part of the Bermuda U23 side who finished fourth in the 2023 Island Games.

== Personal life ==
Russell's father Tokia was also a Bermudan international footballer, as well as his uncle Antwan Russell. His father gave him the middle name Enrique Zidane after Luis Enrique and Zinedine Zidane.

== Career statistics ==
As of match played 5 April 2024

Appearances and goals by national team and year
National team	Year	Apps	Goals
Bermuda	2021	5	1
Bermuda	2022	1	0
Bermuda	2023	6	4
Bermuda	2024	1	0
Bermuda	2025	2	0
Total		15	5

Scores and results list Bermuda's goal tally first, score column indicates score after each Russell goal.

List of international goals scored by Enrique Russell
No.	Date	Venue	Opponent	Score	Result	Competition
1	5 March 2021	IMG Academy, Florida, United States	Bahamas	2–0	3–0	Friendly
2	9 July 2023	The Corbet Field, Saint Sampson, Guernsey	Frøya	6–0	7–0	2023 Island Games
3	10 July 2023	Blanche Pierre Lane, Saint Martin, Guernsey	Orkney	2–1	2–1	2023 Island Games
4	11 July 2023	The Corbet Field, Saint Sampson, Guernsey	Greenland	2–0	3–2	2023 Island Games
5	14 July 2023	Blanche Pierre Lane, Saint Martin, Guernsey	Isle of Wight	1–1	1–2	2023 Island Games
