= Rico Benjamin =

Saint Helenian footballer (born 1994)

Personal information
- Date of birth: 1994 (age 31–32)
- Position: Forward

Senior career*
Years	Team	Apps	(Gls)
2014–	Rovers		(227)

International career^{‡}
2019–2023	Saint Helena	5	(4)
- * Club domestic league appearances and goals as of September 2026 ‡ National team caps and goals as of September 2026

Rico Benjamin (born 1994) is a Saint Helenian footballer who plays for Rovers in the Saint Helena Football League and the Saint Helena football team, whom he is the topscorer and captain.

== Career ==
He started his career at local club Rovers, with whom he has scored an impressive 227 goals.

He played for Saint Helena at the 2019 Inter Games Football Tournament and the 2023 Island Games, scoring 4 goals in 5 games.

Saint Helena Football Association chairman described Benjamin as the most outstanding player Saint Helena has ever had.
