= Bryn Du =

Village in Anglesey, Wales

Coordinates: 53.225397°N 4.485115°W

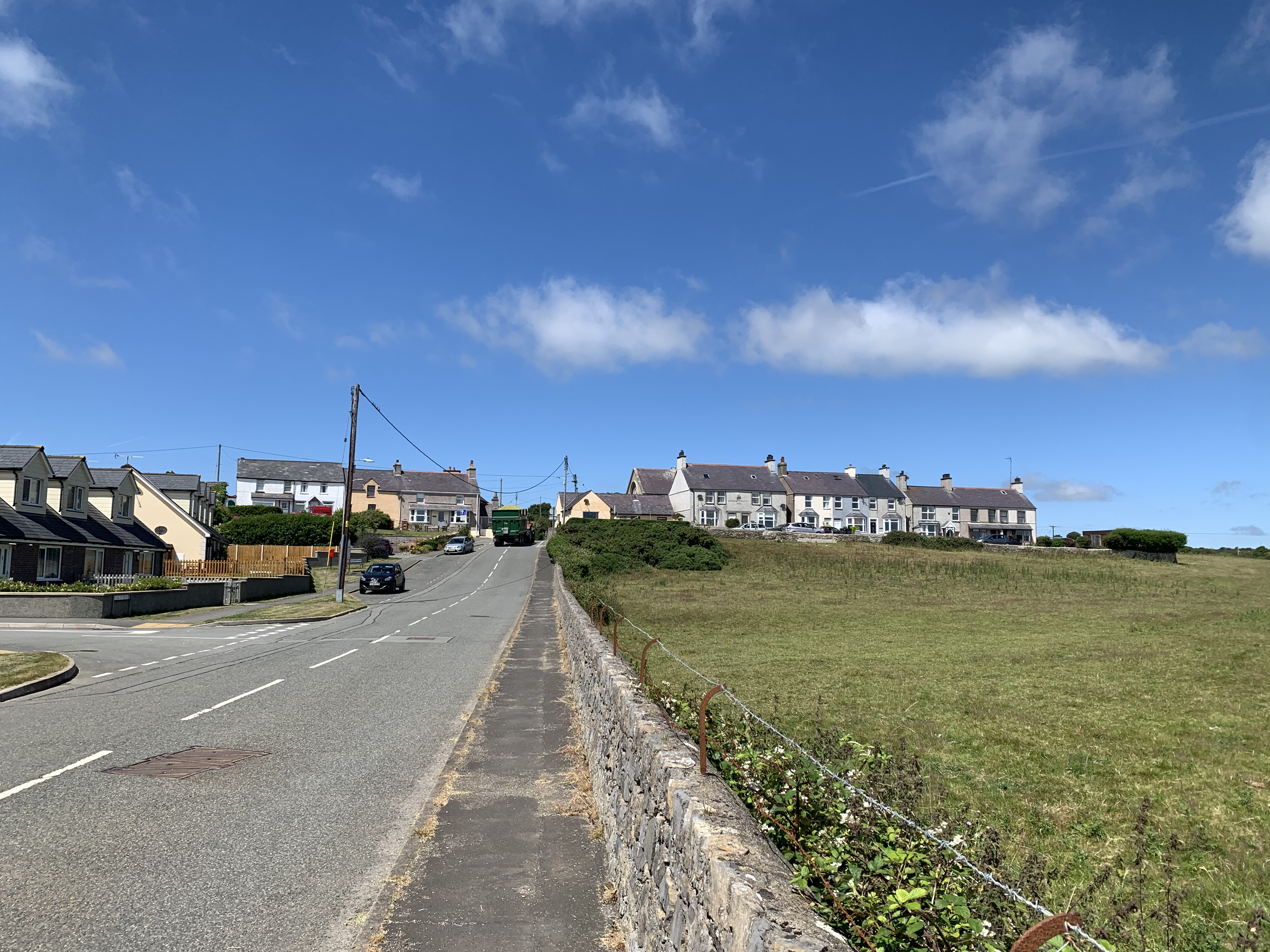

- Location within Anglesey
- Principal area: Anglesey
- Preserved county: Gwynedd
- Country: Wales
- Sovereign state: United Kingdom
- Police: North Wales
- Fire: North Wales
- Ambulance: Welsh
- UK Parliament: Ynys Môn
- Senedd Cymru – Welsh Parliament: Ynys Môn

Bryn Du (meaning: Black Hill) is a village in Anglesey, in north-west Wales. The village is situated about 1 mile from Rhosneigr and in the community of Llanfaelog. The village has a range of houses, some dating back to 1800s. The original Methodist Chapel in Bryn Du was built in the East side of the Village 1795. There is an ATM at the Spar shop on the main road through the village. Tŷ Croes railway station is just over a mile away.

The village hosted several matches of the 2019 Inter Games Football Tournament, a replacement football tournament for the popular Island Games. The games were held in Gibraltar but due to lack of pitches there Anglesey was deemed to be a better host.
