= COVID-19 pandemic in the Crown Dependencies =

Ongoing COVID-19 viral pandemic in Crown dependencies

- Disease: COVID-19
- Pathogen: SARS-CoV-2
- Location: Crown Dependencies

For COVID-19 pandemic issues within the Crown Dependencies, see:

- COVID-19 pandemic in Guernsey
- COVID-19 pandemic in the Isle of Man
- COVID-19 pandemic in Jersey

A survey in late 2020 found that most Crown Dependency residents thought the virus posed more risk to the UK than to their islands. At that time, support for the dependencies' governments' responses to the virus was higher in Guernsey and the Isle of Man, where relatively strict COVID–19 control measures were in place, than in Jersey.
