= Jay Gibbs =

Welsh footballer

Jay Gibbs (born 19 October 1992) is a Welsh footballer who plays as a midfielder for Trearddur Bay.

== Early life ==
As a youth player, Gibbs joined the youth academy of English side Tranmere Rovers, where he was regarded as an important player for the youth team.

== Youth career ==
In 2010, Gibbs played for the Wales national under-19 football team and made appearances against Ireland and Scotland.

== College career ==
Gibbs played for Welsh Colleges, where he scored a hat-trick against England Colleges.

== Senior club career ==
In 2011, Gibbs signed for Welsh side Holyhead Hotspur, where he was regarded as an important player for the club and helped them reach the final of the Cookson Cup. In 2012, he signed for Welsh side Glantraeth. In 2015, he returned to Welsh side Holyhead Hotspur, where he scored three goals in his first two appearances. After that, he signed for Welsh side Caernarfon Town, where he was described as "arguably one of the best players in The Huws Gray Alliance last term and an integral part of Iwan Williams' Caernarfon Town side as they set the league alight during the second half of last season. He was also described as a "midfield talisman" and "super sub" while playing for the club. After that, he signed for Welsh side Llandudno, after "a string of suspensions meant that he was unable to get a consistent run of games". In 2018, he signed for Welsh side Porthmadog, where he was described as "a proven star performer at the tier-two level of Welsh football whose ability has won his many admirers". After that, the returned to Welsh side Holyhead Hotspur, where he was regarded as an important player for the club and suffered relegation.

== International career ==
After that, he played for the Ynys Môn football team after suffering an injury at the 2019 Island Games and was regarded as an important player for the team.

== Style of play ==
Gibbs mainly operates as a midfielder and is known for his long-range shooting ability.

== Personal life ==
Gibbs is a native of Holyhead, Wales.
