= Football at the 2023 Island Games – Men's tournament =

Men's Football at the Island Games 2023

Tournament details
- Host country: Guernsey
- Dates: 9 July – 14 July
- Teams: 16
- Venue: 6

Final positions
- Champions: Jersey (4th title)
- Runners-up: Ynys Môn
- Third place: Isle of Wight
- Fourth place: Bermuda U23

The 2023 Island Games in Guernsey is the sixteenth edition in which a football tournament was played at the multi-games competition.

== Participants ==
- Åland
- Bermuda U23
- Falkland Islands
- Frøya
- Gozo
- Greenland
- Guernsey
- Isle of Man
- Isle of Wight
- Jersey
- Menorca
- Orkney
- Saint Helena
- Shetland
- Western Isles
- Ynys Môn

== Venues ==
Ground	Parish	Capacity
Footes Lane	Saint Peter Port	5,000
The Track	Saint Sampson	3,000
The Corbet Field	Saint Sampson	3,000
College Field	Saint Peter Port	1,200
Northfield	Saint Sampson	900
Blanche Pierre Lane	Saint Martin	750

== Group phase ==
The group phase began on 9 July.

=== Group A ===
Pos	Team	Pld	W	D	L	GF	GA	GD	Pts	Qualification
1	Isle of Wight (A)	3	3	0	0	5	1	+4	9	Final Stage
2	Guernsey (H)	3	2	0	1	6	3	+3	6	
3	Western Isles	3	1	0	2	2	2	0	3	
4	Åland	3	0	0	3	1	8	−7	0	

Updated to match(es) played on 11 July 2023. Source: Guernsey 2023
Rules for classification: Group stage tiebreakers
(A) Advance to a further round; (H) Hosts
9 July 2023
10:30

Åland	0–2	Isle of Wight
	Report	Scrimshaw 3' (pen.), 74'

Northfield Stadium, Saint Sampson
Referee: Joshua Lewis Drake
9 July 2023
18:30

Guernsey	1–0	Western Isles
Allen 53' (pen.)	Report

The Track, Saint Sampson

10 July 2023
14:30

Western Isles	0–1	Isle of Wight
	Report	Scrimshaw 56'

Blanche Pierre Lane, Saint Martin
10 July 2023
18:30

Guernsey	4–1	Åland
Gauvain 2', 56'; Allen 41'; Loaring 53'	Report	Karlström 40' (pen.)

The Track, Saint Sampson

11 July 2023
18.30

Guernsey	1–2	Isle of Wight
Allen 59'	Report	Scrimshaw 17', 45' (pen.)

The Track, Saint Sampson
11 July 2023
18.30

Åland	0–2	Western Isles
		Russell-Smith 34'; Morrison 56'

The Corbet Field, Saint Sampson

=== Group B ===
Pos	Team	Pld	W	D	L	GF	GA	GD	Pts	Qualification
1	Ynys Môn (A)	3	3	0	0	9	2	+7	9	Final Stage
2	Shetland	3	2	0	1	7	5	+2	6	
3	Isle of Man	3	1	0	2	6	5	+1	3	
4	Falkland Islands	3	0	0	3	2	12	−10	0	

Updated to match(es) played on 11 July 2023. Source: Guernsey 2023
Rules for classification: Group stage tiebreakers
(A) Advance to a further round
9 July 2023
14:30

Isle of Man	3–0	Falkland Islands
Patience 10' (pen.); Garland 44', 65'	Report

Blanche Pierre Lane, Saint Martin
9 July 2023
18:30

Ynys Môn	2–0	Shetland
Morris 21'; Gregson 81'	Report

The Corbet Field, Saint Sampson

10 July 2023
18:30

Falkland Islands	1–5	Ynys Môn
Balladares Vergara 3'	Report	Morris 23'; Gregson 28'; Jones 30'; Reynolds 35'; Bentley 76'

The Corbet Field, Saint Sampson
Referee: Adam Simon James McAnoy
10 July 2023
18.30

Shetland	3–2	Isle of Man
Copland 34'; Maver 45'; Thomson 55'	Report	Garland 10'; Kelly 67'

Northfield Stadium, Saint Sampson

11 July 2023
18.30

Falkland Islands	1–4	Shetland
Gilson-Clarke 82'	Report	Aitken 15'; Thomson 31'; Adamson 63'; McShane 85'

Northfield Stadium, Saint Sampson
11 July 2023
18.30

Isle of Man	1–2	Ynys Môn
Ridings 5'	Report	Morris 11', 44'

Blanche Pierre Lane, Saint Martin

=== Group C ===
Pos	Team	Pld	W	D	L	GF	GA	GD	Pts	Qualification
1	Bermuda U23 (A)	3	3	0	0	12	3	+9	9	Final Stage
2	Greenland	3	1	1	1	6	5	+1	4	
3	Orkney	3	1	1	1	6	6	0	4	
4	Frøya	3	0	0	3	2	12	−10	0	

Updated to match(es) played on 11 July 2023. Source: Guernsey 2023
Rules for classification: Group stage tiebreakers
(A) Advance to a further round
9 July 2023
10:30

Bermuda U23	7–0	Frøya
Bean 13', 15', 49'; K. Hall 17'; B. Hall 28'; Russell 71'; Smith-Jones 90'	Report

The Corbet Field, Saint Sampson
Referee: Adam Simon James McAnoy
9 July 2023
10:30

Orkney	2–2	Greenland
Rendall 1'; Macleod 46'	Report	Thomsen 10', 60'
Penalties
	3–4

Blanche Pierre Lane, Saint Martin

10 July 2023
10:30

Greenland	2–0	Frøya
Eriksen 70'; Thomsen 77'	Report

Northfield Stadium, Saint Sampson
10 July 2023
18:30

Bermuda U23	2–1	Orkney
Tucker 45'; Russell 67'	Report	Harrison 8'

Blanche Pierre Lane, Saint Martin

11 July 2023
10.30

Frøya	2–3	Orkney
Furberg 55', 72'	Report	Flett 58', 76'; Macleod 61'

College Field, Saint Peter Port
11 July 2023
10.30

Greenland	2–3	Bermuda U23
Thomsen 72', 79'	Report	Bean 6'; Russell 62'; B. Hall 81'

The Corbet Field, Saint Sampson

=== Group D ===
Pos	Team	Pld	W	D	L	GF	GA	GD	Pts	Qualification
1	Jersey (A)	3	3	0	0	10	0	+10	9	Final Stage
2	Gozo	3	2	0	1	4	1	+3	6	
3	Menorca	3	1	0	2	5	5	0	3	
4	Saint Helena	3	0	0	3	0	13	−13	0	

Updated to match(es) played on 11 July 2023. Source: Guernsey 2023
Rules for classification: Group stage tiebreakers
(A) Advance to a further round
9 July 2023
14:30

Jersey	1–0	Gozo
Solomon 36'	Report

The Corbet Field, Saint Sampson
9 July 2023
18:30

Menorca	5–0	Saint Helena
Hidalgo 10'; Martínez 19', 55'; Urbina 32', 45'	Report

Northfield Stadium, Saint Sampson

10 July 2023
14:30

Gozo	3–0	Saint Helena
Yon 27' (o.g.); Harland 36'; Parnis 80'	Report

The Track, Saint Sampson
10 July 2023
14:30

Jersey	4–0	Menorca
Solomon 16'; Ritzema 19'; Campbell 65' (pen.); Hinds 83'	Report

Northfield Stadium, Saint Sampson

11 July 2023
10.30

Menorca	0–1	Gozo
	Report	Parnis 53'

Blanche Pierre Lane, Saint Martin
11 July 2023
10.30

Saint Helena	0–5	Jersey
	Report	Ritzema 5', 7'; Hinds 42', 47'; Watson 75'

Northfield Stadium, Saint Sampson

== Placement play-off matches ==
=== 15th place match ===
13 July 2023
10:30

Frøya	4–2	Saint Helena
Gaasø 12'; O. Espnes 25', 39'; I. Espnes 52'	Report	Stroud 5'; R. Benjamin 88'

Blanche Pierre Lane, Saint Martin

=== 13th place match ===
13 July 2023
10:30

Åland	1–1	Falkland Islands
Karlström 16'	Report	Bonner 62'
Penalties
	4–2

The Corbet Field, Saint Sampson

=== 11th place match ===
13 July 2023
10:30

Western Isles	2–1	Menorca
Barber 57' (o.g.); MacAulay 89'	Report	Martínez 28'

Northfield Stadium, Saint Sampson

=== 9th place match ===
13 July 2023
14.30

Orkney	0–1	Isle of Man
	Report	Woods 90'

The Track, Saint Sampson

=== 7th place match ===
13 July 2023
14.30

Shetland	5–1	Greenland
Grant 11', 49', 66'; Aitken 59'; Laurenson 62'	Report	Thomsen 49'

The Corbet Field, Saint Sampson

=== 5th place match ===
13 July 2023
14.30

Guernsey	1–0	Gozo
Domaille 52'	Report

Blanche Pierre Lane, Saint Martin

== Final Stage ==
=== Bracket ===
Semi-finals
13 July – Blanche Pierre Lane
Ynys Môn	2
Bermuda U23	0
13 July – The Track
Isle of Wight	2
Jersey	3

Final
14 July – Footes Lane
Ynys Môn	2
Jersey	5
Third place
14 July – Blanche Pierre Lane
Bermuda U23	1
Isle of Wight	2

=== Semi-finals ===
13 July 2023
18.30

Isle of Wight	2–3	Jersey
Scrimshaw 41', 47'	Report	Campbell 19'; Solomon 63'; Bickley 71'

The Track, Saint Sampson
Referee: Adam Simon James McAnoy

13 July 2023
18.30

Ynys Môn	2–0	Bermuda U23
Reynolds 22'; Morris 40'	Report

Blanche Pierre Lane, Saint Martin

=== Third place match ===
14 July 2023
14.30

Bermuda U23	1–2	Isle of Wight
Russell 35'	Report	Craig 53', 55'

Blanche Pierre Lane, Saint Martin

=== Final ===
14 July 2023
15.30

Ynys Môn	2–5	Jersey
Jones 2'; Gregson 16'	Report	Bickley 6', 50'; Hinds 35'; Ritzema 42'; Watson 87'

Footes Lane, Saint Peter Port
Referee: Alex Rolfe

2023 Island Games Winners
Jersey
4th Title

== Statistics ==
=== Goalscorers ===
There were 119 goals scored in 34 matches, for an average of 3.5 goals per match (as of 14 July 2023).

7 goals

- (Isle of Wight) Jake Scrimshaw

6 goals

- (Greenland) Nemo Thomsen

5 goals

- (Anglesey) Liam Morris

4 goals

- (Bermuda) Jai Bean
- (Bermuda) Tokia Russell
- (Jersey) Karl Hinds
- (Jersey) Toby Ritzema

3 goals

- (Guernsey) Ross Allen
- (Isle of Man) Ryan Garland
- (Jersey) Lorne Bickley
- (Jersey) Sol Solomon
- (Menorca) Luis David Martínez
- (Shetland) Ronan Grant
- (Anglesey) Sam Gregson

2 goals

- (Åland) Joel Karlström
- (Bermuda) Blaiz Hall
- (Frøya Municipality) Oliver Espnes
- (Frøya Municipality) Nataniel Furberg
- (Gozo) Jordi Parnis
- (Guernsey) Charlton Gauvain
- (Isle of Wight) Joseph Craig
- (Jersey) Luke Campbell
- (Jersey) Luke Watson
- (Menorca) Marc Urbina
- (Orkney) Jamie Flett
- (Orkney) Toby Macleod
- (Shetland) James Aitken
- (Shetland) Harry Thomson
- (Anglesey) Sam Jones
- (Anglesey) Matt Reynolds

1 goal

- (Bermuda) Kashe Hall
- (Bermuda) Rahzir Smith-Jones
- (Bermuda) Ne-Jai Tucker
- (Falkland Islands) Patricio Balladares Vergara
- (Falkland Islands) Declan Bonner
- (Falkland Islands) Ethan Gilson-Clarke
- (Frøya Municipality) Isak Espnes
- (Frøya Municipality) Kristoffer Gaasø
- (Gozo) Samuel Harland
- (Greenland) Niels-Erik Eriksen
- (Guernsey) Keene Domaille
- (Guernsey) Matt Loaring
- (Isle of Man) Brody Patience
- (Isle of Man) Philip Kelly
- (Isle of Man) Joshua Ridings
- (Isle of Man) Matthew Woods
- (Menorca) Roberto Pulido
- (Orkney) Craig Harrison
- (Orkney) Connan Rendall
- (Saint Helena) Rico Benjamin
- (Saint Helena) Shane Stroud
- (Shetland) Declan Adamson
- (Shetland) Stuart Copland
- (Shetland) Neil Laurenson
- (Shetland) Sam Maver
- (Shetland) Jack McShane
- (Outer Hebrides) Dominic MacAulay
- (Outer Hebrides) James Morrison
- (Outer Hebrides) Micheil Russell Smith
- (Anglesey) Kaine Bentley

1 own goal

- (Saint Helena) Keith Yon (against Gozo)
- (Menorca) Eric Barber (against Western Isles)

=== Final rankings ===
Rank	Team
Gold medal	Jersey
Silver medal	Ynys Môn
Bronze medal	Isle of Wight
4	Bermuda
5	Guernsey
6	Gozo
7	Shetland
8	Greenland
9	Isle of Man
10	Orkney
11	Western Isles
12	Menorca
13	Åland
14	Falkland Islands
15	Frøya
16	Saint Helena

== See also ==
- Football at the 2023 Island Games – Women's tournament
- Football at the 2023 Island Games
