= Kamaljit =

Kamaljit or Kamaljeet is an Indian unisex given name and may refer to:

- Kamaljeet (died 2000), Indian film actor
- Kamaljeet (sport shooter) (born 2003), Indian sport shooter
- Kamaljit Bawa (born 1939), Indian evolutionary ecologist and conservation biologist
- Kamaljeet Kumar, Indian footballer
- Kamaljit Neeru, Indian singer
- Kamaljeet Sandhu, Indian athlete (sprinter)
- Kamaljeet Sehrawat, Indian politician
- Kamaljit Singh, Indian footballer
- Kamaljit Singh (footballer, born 1994), German footballer
- Kamaljit Singh Garewal, Indian judge
- Kamaljeet Singh Heer or Kamal Heer, Indian-Canadian musician
- Kamaljit Singh Jhooti or Jay Sean, British-Indian singer, songwriter and rapper
- Kamaljit Singh Paul, Indian neurosurgeon
- Kamal Jit Singh, Indian Army Lt. Gen. and present GoC-in-C of Western Command
