= Cascadia official soccer team =

North American football team

Cascadia
- Nickname: The Dougs
- Association: Cascadia Association Football Federation
- Confederation: ConIFA
- Sub-confederation: North America and Caribbean
- Head coach: James Nichols
- Captain: Patrick Wilson
- Most caps: Max Oldham (8)
- Top scorer: Calum Ferguson (5)
First colors	Second colors

First international
- Ellan Vannin 4–1 Cascadia (Sutton, Surrey; May 31, 2018)

Biggest win
- Cascadia 8–1 Darfur (Kent, Cascadia; July 27, 2019)

Biggest defeat
- (Cornwall) Kernow 8–1 Cascadia (Northwood, Middlesex; May 22, 2021)

ConIFA World Football Cup
- Appearances: 1 (first in 2018)
- Best result: 6th, 2018
- Website: cascadiafootball.org

The Cascadia national soccer team is a soccer team representing the men's side of the Cascadia region of the United States and Canada and is controlled by the Cascadia Association Football Federation (CAFF). The team is composed of players from the U.S states of Oregon, Washington and the Canadian province of British Columbia. The stated mission of the team is "...to allow Cascadia as a distinct cultural entity, isolated bioregion and growing society with common interests to be represented at the international level in the sport we are all passionate about." CAFF is a member of ConIFA. Cascadia is not a member of FIFA or any confederation or sub-confederation as the region is wholly a part of both the United States or Canada. However, CAFF is not opposed to those organizations and sees itself coexisting as a non-FIFA regional representative team.

It is hoped that the team will help expose more players from the region to international competition as well as foster a connection between the culture of Cascadia with other regions and peoples around the world. Cascadia participated in the 2018 ConIFA World Football Cup.

== History ==
The idea of a Cascadia representative soccer team existed long before the founder of CAFF and friends first discussed the possibility. People on internet soccer discussion forums discussed the possibility as far back as 2011. In early 2012 an Adidas Cascadia football shirt was designed by Kelly Dews and sold through the Cascadia Trifecta Facebook group to supporters and fans of the three Cascadian MLS teams: Vancouver Whitecaps FC, Seattle Sounders FC, and the Portland Timbers. The first run of these shirts were highly popular and were visible at matches throughout the region.

Following the 2012 London Olympic Games and noting the athletes from Cascadia, former CAFF President Leonard Laymon and others began investigating just what it would take to form a non-FIFA regional representative team. In August 2012 the decision was made to go forward with making such a team a reality and networking was conducted with the non-FIFA football community.

In January 2013 CAFF convened its first general meeting at the headquarters of Golazo Energy in Seattle. At this meeting CAFF's board of directors was elected and its bylaws and team eligibility requirements ratified, by vote. It was also determined in a vote by the CAFF board following the meeting that Cascadia would send a representative to the N.F. Board's Annual General in Munich Germany at the end of the next month. An Indiegogo campaign raised the funding for the application process in less than a week.

In February 2013 Sascha Tillmanns was elected as Cascadia's European representative and initially sent to the meeting to deliver CAFF's application documents, express Cascadia's interest in joining the N.F. Board and help CAFF get an understanding of what its next steps should be. Tillmanns was asked at the meeting to give a presentation on Cascadia which was well received. In early March 2013 Cascadia learned that the N.F. Board would be deciding in the summer to admit up to three new members, of which Cascadia was one. Following this positive news that the early work of looking for Cascadia eligible players and a coach began.

In late April 2013, Alan Koch of Simon Fraser University in Burnaby, BC was the first potential coach to step forward and declare interest in becoming Cascadia's first coach. Later in July 2013 another potential Cascadia coach emerged when in a Q&A session on Twitter, former US men's national team defender and ESPN analyst Alexi Lalas proclaimed that "it would be an honor" to coach Cascadia.

In 2014 Cascadia joined CONIFA under the leadership of then President, Aaron Johnsen.

In June 2018 Cascadia took park in the 2018 CONIFA World Football Cup in London, finishing 6th. CAFF qualified for the tournament by being the only active CONIFA member in North America

Cascadia hosted its first true home match on July 27, 2019, playing a friendly against Darfur at French Field in Kent, Washington. Cascadia won the friendly 8–1.

In October 2019 CAFF made an agreement with the Western Washington Premier League. WWPL became an affiliate league of CAFF, and the two organizations will work together on projects.

== International record ==
=== CONIFA World Football Cup ===
Year	Position	P	W	D	L	GF	GA
(Sápmi) 2014	did not enter						
(Abkhazia) 2016	did not enter						
(Barawa) 2018	6th	6	3	1	2	17	11
(North Macedonia) 2020	Cancelled due to COVID-19						
Total		6	3	1	2	17	11

Cascadia qualified to participate in the 2018 CONIFA WFC by merit of being the only organization of its kind in North America in good standing with CONIFA. In April, UEFA B license coach James Nichols was brought on to lead the team. Despite an opening day defeat to Ellan Vannin, a 6–0 victory over Tamil Eelam ensured Cascadia's progress to the quarter finals on goal difference. However a defeat to eventual winners Kárpátalja saw Cascadia crash out. A 4–0 win over Western Armenia ensured they would finish in the 5th–6th place playoff, for the best teams knocked out of the quarter finals. Despite coming back from 3 goals down to draw 3–3, Cascadia eventually lost on penalties to early tournament favorites Panjab to finish 6th.

== Fixtures and results ==
=== 2018 ===
May 31, 2018 2018 ConIFA WFC Group A	Ellan Vannin	4–1	(Cascadia movement) Cascadia	Sutton, Surrey
	Whitley 15'; Jones 41'; Caine 62'; McVey 70'		18' Doughty	Stadium: Gander Green Lane

June 2, 2018 2018 ConIFA WFC Group A	Barawa	1–2	(Cascadia movement) Cascadia	Carshalton, Surrey
	Bettamer 9'		35' Doughty; 45+1' Morales	Stadium: Colston Avenue

June 3, 2018 2018 ConIFA WFC Group A	Tamil Eelam	0–6	(Cascadia movement) Cascadia	Rotherhithe, Surrey
			10' (pen.), 87' Nouble; 32', 71' Hayden-Smith; 69' Farkas; 89' Ferguson	Stadium: St Paul's Sports Ground, Rotherhithe

June 5, 2018 2018 ConIFA WFC QF	Kárpátalja	3–1	(Cascadia movement) Cascadia	Sutton, Surrey
	Gyürki 49'; Takács 59'; Gajdos 87' (pen.)		80' Haddadi	Stadium: Gander Green Lane

June 7, 2018 2018 ConIFA WFC PR2	Cascadia (Cascadia movement)	4–0	Western Armenia	Bromley, Kent
	Ferguson 24', 62'; Oldham 54'; Farkas 79'			Stadium: Hayes Lane

June 9, 2018 2018 ConIFA WFC PR3	Panjab	3–3 (4–3 p)	(Cascadia movement) Cascadia	Rotherhithe, Surrey
	Virk 18'; Minhas 24', 34'		Morales 45'; Ferguson 54', 60'	Stadium: St Paul's Sports Ground
	Penalties
	Purewal (penalty missed); Zia (penalty missed); Virk (penalty scored); Dhillon (penalty scored); K. Singh (penalty scored); Jung (penalty scored)		(penalty missed) Riley; (penalty missed) Gregory; (penalty scored) J. Wilson; (penalty scored) Oldham; (penalty scored) Haddadi; (penalty missed) Levock

=== 2019 ===
May 25, 2019 Friendly	Cascadia (Cascadia movement)	6–3	Chagos Islands	Whyteleafe, Surrey
	Powell 22', 73'; Boone 23', 78'; Calfo 46'; Oldham 50'	Report	Sagai 30'; Bunjun 51' (pen.); Heroseau 87'	Stadium: Church Road; Referee: Dan Friar

July 27, 2019 Friendly	Cascadia (Cascadia movement)	8–1	Darfur	Kent, Cascadia
	Haddadi 9', 23', 65' (pen.); Blanchard 39'; Menzies 45'; Bjork 47', 72', 81'		Abdulkhalik 68'	Stadium: French Field; Attendance: 152

=== 2021 ===
May 22, 2021 Friendly	Kernow (Cornwall)	8–1	Cascadia	Northwood, Middlesex
		Report		Stadium: Acretweed Stadium

== Squad ==
=== Current squad ===
The following players were called up to the Cascadia squad for the friendly against Cornwall on May 22, 2021.

No.	Pos.	Player	Date of birth (age)	Caps	Goals	Club
1	GK	James Mayo		1	0	(Hampshire Football Association) Brockenhurst
3	DF	Taylor Fisher	April 17, 2000 (age 26)	2	0	(Kent Football Association) Sittingbourne
4	DF	Albie Sheehan-Cozens	February 1, 1998 (age 28)	1	0	(Essex Football Association) Barking
5	DF	Patrick Wilson (captain)	May 16, 1986 (age 40)	7	0	(Hampshire Football Association) Brockenhurst
12	DF	Jacob Toms		2	0	(Hampshire Football Association) Unattached
13	DF	Kyle Lemon	November 28, 1998 (age 27)	1	0	(Middlesex Football Association) Unattached
6	MF	Connor Campbell		1	0	(Northumberland Football Association) Unattached
7	MF	Max Oldham	July 8, 1993 (age 33)	8	3	(Surrey Football Association) Corinthian-Casuals
8	MF	Josh Ekim	November 17, 1991 (age 34)	1	0	(Surrey Football Association) Corinthian-Casuals
10	MF	Tayshan Hayden-Smith	September 23, 1996 (age 30)	5	2	(Surrey Football Association) Walton Casuals
11	MF	Kellen Fisher		1	0	(Kent Football Association) Bromley
9	FW	Gavin McCallum	August 24, 1987 (age 39)	1	0	(Sussex Football Association) Bognor Regis Town
14	FW	Matt Smith		0	0	(Lancashire Football Association) Unattached - UCFB
15	FW	Adam Budz	November 28, 2000 (age 25)	0	0	(Warwickshire Football Association) Sutton Coldfield Town

=== Recent call-ups ===
Pos.	Player	Date of birth (age)	Caps	Goals	Club	Latest call-up
GK	Will Marment	October 16, 1998 (age 28)	4	0	(New York (state)) Vassar College	(Barawa) 2018 ConIFA WFC
GK	Alejandro De La Torre	May 7, 1999 (age 27)	2	0	(Texas) Round Rock	(Barawa) 2018 ConIFA WFC
GK	Dorian Lair		1	0	(Cascadia movement) Snohomish County	Darfur
GK	Brendan Norris		1	0	(Hampshire) Winchester City	Chagos Islands
MF	Anthony Wright	November 10, 1997 (age 28)	6	0	(Oxfordshire) Banbury United	(Barawa) 2018 ConIFA WFC
DF	James Riley	October 27, 1982 (age 44)	6	0	(Cascadia movement) Tacoma Stars	Darfur
DF	Charlie Gregory	December 27, 1991 (age 34)	7	0	(Essex) Sporting Bengal United	Chagos Islands
DF	Matt Braem	June 25, 1994 (age 32)	4	0	(Michigan) AFC Ann Arbor	(Barawa) 2018 ConIFA WFC
DF	Noah Cavanaugh	August 17, 1995 (age 31)	1	0	(Basque Country (autonomous community)) Real Unión	Darfur
DF	Joey Censoni	September 3, 1993 (age 33)	2	0	(Michigan) Carpathia FC	(Barawa) 2018 ConIFA WFC
DF	Julius Lansiquot	November 6, 1999 (age 26)	1	0	(Middlesex) Barnet	(Barawa) 2018 ConIFA WFC
DF	Sofien El-Mehrik	December 15, 1993 (age 32)	0	0	(Cascadia movement) Unattached	(Barawa) 2018 ConIFA WFC
DF	Ellis Routledge	October 25, 1999 (age 27)	0	0	(Middlesex) Wingate & Finchley	(Barawa) 2018 ConIFA WFC
DF	Lorne Jenkins	May 23, 1995 (age 31)	1	0	(Essex) Unattached	Chagos Islands
MF	Héctor Morales	January 19, 1993 (age 33)	6	2	(Michigan) AFC Ann Arbor	(Barawa) 2018 ConIFA WFC
MF	Angelo Calfo		2	1	(Yorkshire) RIASA	Darfur
MF	Jordan Wilson	October 31, 1991 (age 35)	6	0	(Denmark) Nykøbing FC	(Barawa) 2018 ConIFA WFC
MF	Josh Doughty	April 8, 1997 (age 29)	3	2	(Cascadia movement) Unattached	(Barawa) 2018 ConIFA WFC
MF	Nikko Stokes	July 16, 2000 (age 26)	0	0	(Essex) Waltham Forest	(Barawa) 2018 ConIFA WFC
MF	Tanner Williams	June 29, 1993 (age 33)	1	0	(Cascadia movement) Spokane Shadow	Darfur
MF	Duncan McCormick	November 1, 1995 (age 31)	1	0	(Arizona) Phoenix Rising	Darfur
MF	Beau Blanchard		1	1	(Cascadia movement) UW Huskies	Darfur
MF	Quinn Fahling		1	0	(Cascadia movement) Seattle University	Darfur
MF	Brian Simpson	May 24, 1998 (age 28)	3	0	(Hertfordshire) Hatfield Town	Chagos Islands
MF	Zane Provenzano		2	0	(Yorkshire) RIASA	Darfur
MF	Scott Menzies		1	1	(Cascadia movement) UW Huskies	Darfur
MF	Tyler Bjork		1	3	(Cascadia movement) Spokane Shadow	Darfur
FW	Calum Ferguson	May 17, 1995 (age 31)	6	5	(Scotland) Elgin City	(Barawa) 2018 ConIFA WFC
FW	Yuri Farkas	July 21, 1993 (age 33)	4	2	(Michigan) AFC Ann Arbor	(Barawa) 2018 ConIFA WFC
FW	Keaton Levock	October 17, 1994 (age 32)	3	0	(Michigan) Carpathia FC	(Barawa) 2018 ConIFA WFC
FW	Jon Nouble	January 19, 1996 (age 30)	2	2	(Middlesex) Unattached	(Barawa) 2018 ConIFA WFC
FW	Hamza Haddadi	January 31, 1994 (age 32)	3	4	(Cascadia movement) Kitsap Pumas	Darfur
FW	Chase Boone		1	2	(Yorkshire) RIASA	Chagos Islands
FW	Callum Powell	January 28, 1996 (age 30)	1	2	(Worcestershire) Stourbridge	Chagos Islands

=== Head coach ===
Manager	Period	Played	Won	Drawn	Lost	Win %
(Lancashire) / (England) James Nichols	2018–present	9	5	1	3	55.6
Totals		9	5	1	3	55.6

== Records ==
=== Top goal scorers ===
#	Name	Career	Goals	Caps	Position
1	Calum Ferguson	2018–	5	6	FW
2	Hamza Haddadi	2018–	4	3	FW
3	Max Oldham	2018–	3	8	MF
3	Tyler Bjork	2019–	3	1	FW

== Kit ==
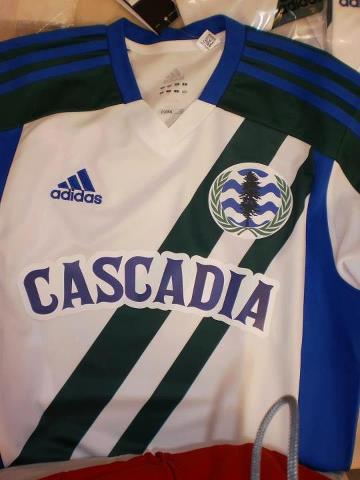
Cascadia Kit V 1.0

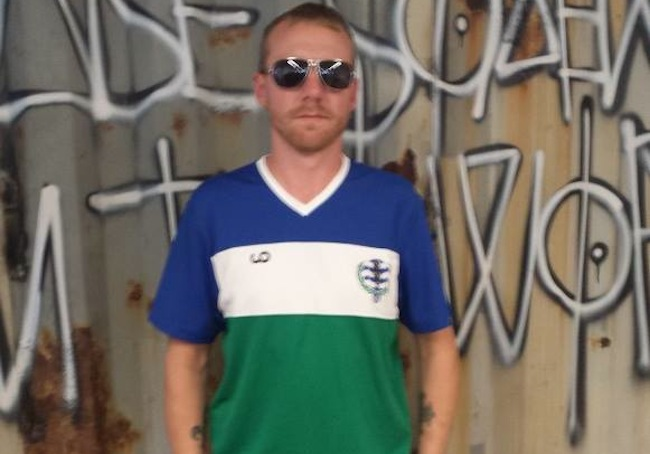
Cascadia Kit V 2.0 Prototype

In early 2012, Kelly Dews designed an Adidas-produced limited run of Cascadia shirts. The kit was white, green and blue with a green sash, reflecting the colors of the Doug flag.

In August the new design was announced by Kelly Dews and the Cascadia Association Football Federation. It is a horizontal tri-color design similar to that of the flag of Cascadia. It features the CAFF crest on the front and Cascadia on the neckline in the back. The new shirt is made by a local company, Looptworks, but never used. After Cascadia were announced to feature in the 2018 ConIFA World Football Cup the team announced Stingz Sportswear as their kit supplier and a Giordano sponsorship.

== See also ==
- Canada men's national soccer team
- Non-FIFA international football
- United States men's national soccer team
