= 2018 CONIFA World Football Cup =

Tournament details
- Host country: England (host association: Barawa)
- Dates: 31 May – 9 June
- Teams: 16
- Venues: 10 (in 3 host cities)

Final positions
- Champions: Kárpátalja (1st title)
- Runners-up: Northern Cyprus
- Third place: Padania
- Fourth place: Székely Land

Tournament statistics
- Matches played: 41
- Goals scored: 158 (3.85 per match)
- Top scorer: (Panjab) Kamaljit Singh (6 goals)

The 2018 CONIFA World Football Cup was the third edition of the CONIFA World Football Cup, an international football tournament for states, minorities, stateless peoples and regions unaffiliated with FIFA organised by CONIFA. The tournament was hosted by Barawa Football Association, with all games held in and around London. The tournament was sponsored by Irish bookmaker Paddy Power. After being a late entry to the tournament, Kárpátalja won their first title on 9 June 2018, defeating Northern Cyprus 3–2 on penalties in the final (0–0 after 90 minutes).

== Host selection ==
In June 2017, at the CONIFA meeting held during the 2017 CONIFA European Football Cup, it was announced that the Barawa Football Association had been selected to act as the host for the 2018 CONIFA World Football Cup. However, under CONIFA's criteria, the "host" is the CONIFA member that heads the organising committee for the tournament, which does not necessarily mean that it needs to be played in the host's territory. Barawa is located in Somalia, but the Barawa FA represents members of the Somali diaspora in England.

== Venues ==
The first two CONIFA World Football Cup tournaments both featured no more than two venues each; the 2014 tournament featured all games played at the same stadium, while the 2016 edition had a stadium in each of two cities. The expansion from twelve to sixteen participants in 2018 saw a significant expansion in the number of venues used, with a total of ten selected in four separate towns and cities - of these, seven were located in Greater London itself, two were in the towns of Slough and Bracknell in Berkshire, and one in the borough of Thurrock in Essex.

Greater London
Sutton	Bromley	Enfield	Haringey
Gander Green Lane	Hayes Lane	Queen Elizabeth II Stadium	Coles Park
Capacity: 5,000	Capacity: 5,000	Capacity: 2,500	Capacity: 2,500
Greater London	2018 CONIFA World Football Cup is located in Greater London		Greater London
Carshalton	2018 CONIFA World Football Cup is located in Greater London		Rotherhithe
Colston Avenue	2018 CONIFA World Football Cup is located in Greater London		St Paul's Sports Ground
Capacity: 5,000	2018 CONIFA World Football Cup is located in Greater London		Capacity: 1,000
Greater London	2018 CONIFA World Football Cup is located in Berkshire		Essex
Bedfont	2018 CONIFA World Football Cup is located in Berkshire		Aveley
Bedfont Recreation Ground	2018 CONIFA World Football Cup is located in Berkshire		Parkside
Capacity: 3,000	2018 CONIFA World Football Cup is located in Berkshire		Capacity: 3,500
Berkshire
Bracknell		Slough	
Larges Lane		Arbour Park	
Capacity: 2,500		Capacity: 2,000	

== Qualification ==
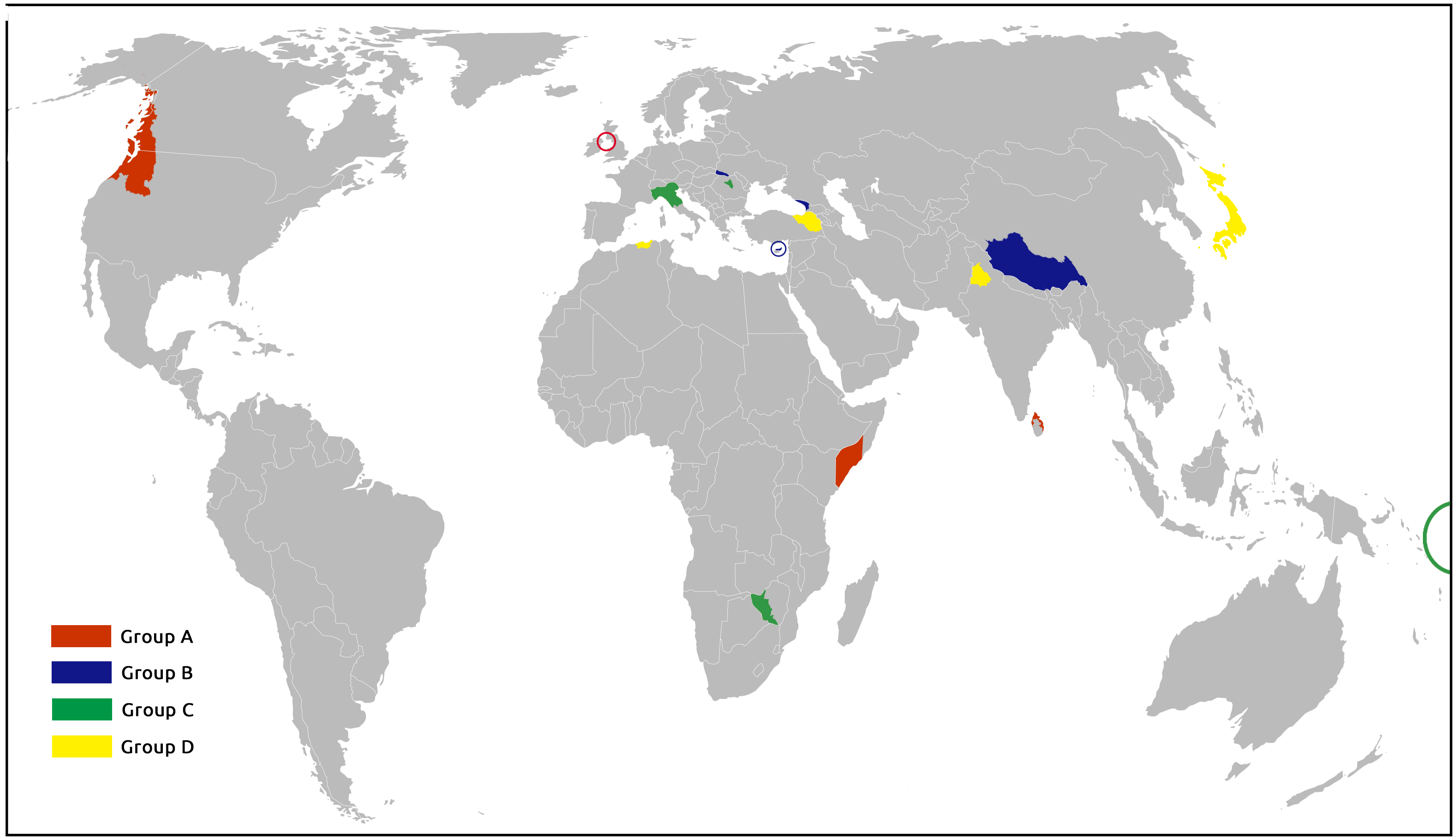
CONIFA WFC 2018 teams

The process of qualification for the World Football Cup was originally laid out in a set of criteria published by CONIFA at its 2017 annual general meeting, which goes into the various ways by which teams can qualify. This was subsequently revised by CONIFA in June 2017.

- Host - Providing at least 10 places are available for other qualifiers, then all hosts will qualify automatically. If there are less than 10 other places available, then the number of automatic host places is calculated by the total number of places in the tournament minus 10.
- World Football Cup Holder - The current holder of the World Football Cup qualifies automatically.
- Wild Card - CONIFA's Executive Committee issues a Wild Card place to a team that has not yet qualified for the WFC no later than 9 months prior to the start of the tournament. The committee also has the right to issue a second Wild Card if approved by CONIFA's Annual General Meeting.
- Qualification tournament - Any member of CONIFA has the right to request that a tournament it hosts be sanctioned as a qualifier, providing it is held between 1 January of the year of the previous WFC, and 31 December of the year before the next WFC, and consists of at least four CONIFA members. The request to have the tournament sanctioned as a qualifier must be submitted at least two months prior to the start, and must be approved by CONIFA's Executive Committee.
- Continental tournament - If a CONIFA continental championship is held after the previous WFC, then a number of its participants qualify for the WFC; the total qualifiers is worked out by the number of participants in the tournament divided by 4.
- Qualification points - Remaining places are distributed according to the final positions in the various CONIFA continental rankings according to their accumulated ranking points. If two or more teams have the same number of qualification points, qualification will be determined by the CONIFA World Rankings.

Qualification points
Opposition Factor (OF)	Result Factor (RF)
CONIFA Member = 3	Win = 3
Other international opposition = 2	Draw = 2
Any other opposition = 1	Defeat = 1
Points for a single match = OF × RF
Matches played in WFC do not count towards qualification points totals.; Only the first two matches between teams accrue points.; Additional matches are only considered if played as part of a tournament.; Only the ten matches where a team accrued the most points are considered.; If a member hosts a continental championship during the qualifying period, it receives additional points (number of participants × 3).

By the criteria set out, the qualification process began in January 2016, when Western Armenia played its first official game against the reserve team of the French club Olympique de Marseille. The first team to qualify automatically was Tamil Eelam, by winning the single match CONIFA Challenger Cup against the Romani people in March 2016. Following this, two further, multi-team competitions were awarded qualification status by CONIFA, the Hungary Heritage Cup, played between four CONIFA members representing the Hungarian diaspora, and the World Unity Cup, which was a tournament containing teams representing a number of displaced peoples. The winners of both of these tournaments were guaranteed qualification for the World Football Cup.

=== Qualified teams ===
Team	Region	Method of qualification	Date of qualification	Finals appearance	Previous appearance	Previous best performance	Notes
Tamil Eelam	Asia	ConIFA Challenger Cup winners	13 March 2016	2nd	2014	Placement round (2014)	
Abkhazia	Europe	ConIFA World Football Cup winners	6 June 2016	3rd	2016	Winners (2016)	
Felvidék	Europe	Hungary Heritage Cup winners	3 August 2016	1st	N/A	N/A	Subsequently withdrew
Western Armenia	Asia	Wild card	14 January 2017	2nd	2016	Quarter-final (2016)	
Barawa	Africa	Host	8 June 2017	1st	N/A	N/A	
Tibet	Asia	Wild card	8 June 2017	1st	N/A	N/A	
Kiribati	Oceania	Regional qualification	8 June 2017	1st	N/A	N/A	Subsequently withdrew
Cascadia	North America	Regional qualification	8 June 2017	1st	N/A	N/A	
Padania	Europe	ConIFA European Football Cup winners	10 June 2017	3rd	2016	4th place (2016)	
Northern Cyprus	Europe	ConIFA European Football Cup runners-up	10 June 2017	2nd	2016	3rd place (2016)	
Panjab	Asia	Regional qualification	2 September 2017	2nd	2016	2nd place (2016)	
United Koreans in Japan	Asia	Regional qualification	2 September 2017	2nd	2016	Quarter-final (2016)	
Matabeleland	Africa	Regional qualification	2 September 2017	1st	N/A	N/A	
Kabylia	Africa	Regional qualification	2 September 2017	1st	N/A	N/A	
Ellan Vannin	Europe	Regional qualification	2 September 2017	2nd	2014	2nd place (2014)	
Székely Land	Europe	Regional qualification	2 September 2017	2nd	2016	Placement round (2016)	
Tuvalu	Oceania	Replacement	7 March 2018	1st	N/A	N/A	Replaced Kiribati
Kárpátalja	Europe	Replacement	4 May 2018	1st	N/A	N/A	Replaced Felvidék

=== Draw ===
In December 2017, the sixteen participating teams were seeded into four pots of four for the group stage draw, based on the ConIFA rankings. The draw for the group stage was held on 6 January 2018 in Northern Cyprus.

Pot 1	Pot 2	Pot 3	Pot 4
Barawa; Abkhazia; Panjab; Padania	Northern Cyprus; Székely Land; United Koreans in Japan; Ellan Vannin	Felvidék; Tamil Eelam; Western Armenia; Kiribati	Tibet; Matabeleland; Kabylia; Cascadia

=== Withdrawals ===
In March 2018, ConIFA announced that, owing to financial difficulties, the Kiribati team had been forced to withdraw from the tournament, with their place taken by Tuvalu. In May 2018, it was announced that the Felvidék team had withdrawn, to be replaced by Kárpátalja.

== Referees ==
ConIFA announced a total of 28 referees for the tournament, led by former Premier League official Mark Clattenburg. During the tournament, referees used a third card in addition to the red and yellow; the green card, introduced as a concept by the tournament sponsor Paddy Power, was issued to players either for dissent or diving; a player given a green card was required to be substituted immediately.

Referees
Referee	Country
Mark Clattenburg	England
Oliver Potter	England
Karl Parker	England
Igor Gorshkov	Canada
Clément Auclair	France
Raymond Mashamba	Zimbabwe
Dmitrii Zhukov	Ukraine
Vitalii Mazin	Ukraine
Valerii Kravchenko	Ukraine
Aleksandr Demenko	Ukraine
Givi Todua	Russia
Kristian Michel	Slovakia
Vinze Otten	Netherlands
Alan Martinez	United States
David Murphy	Scotland
James Turpin	Isle of Man
Denis Pérez González	Spain
Andrew Mario Parody	Gibraltar
Utku Hamamcioglu	Turkey
Fehim Dayı	Northern Cyprus
Zekai Tore	Northern Cyprus
Isfendiyar Açiksoz	Northern Cyprus
Esposito Pasquale	Italy
Mario Guastafierro	Italy
Massimo Amitrano	Italy
Mario Sasso	Italy
Wilhelm Gürtler	Germany
René Jacobi	Germany
Martin Heiland	Germany
Martin Rauh	Germany
Leon Dastych	Germany
Ivan Mrkalj	Germany

== Matches ==
=== Group stage ===
==== Group A ====
Team	Pld	W	D	L	GF	GA	GD	Pts	Qualification
Barawa	3	2	0	1	7	2	+5	6	Advance to quarter-finals
Cascadia	3	2	0	1	9	5	+4	6	Advance to quarter-finals
Ellan Vannin	3	2	0	1	6	3	+3	6	Advance to placement round
Tamil Eelam	3	0	0	3	0	12	−12	0	Advance to placement round

31 May 2018
12:00 BST

Ellan Vannin	4–1	Cascadia
Whitley 15'; Jones 41'; Caine 62'; McVey 70'	Report	Doughty 18'

Gander Green Lane, Sutton
Referee: Ivan Mrkalj
31 May 2018
20:00 BST

Barawa	4–0	Tamil Eelam
Sambou 17'; Lucien 30' (pen.), 80' (pen.); Crichlow 43'	Report

Hayes Lane, Bromley
Attendance: 1
Referee: Mark Clattenburg

2 June 2018
14:00 BST

Barawa	1–2	Cascadia
Bettamer 9'	Report	Doughty 35'; Morales 45+1'

Colston Avenue, Carshalton
Referee: Utku Hamamcioglu
2 June 2018
17:00 BST

Ellan Vannin	2–0	Tamil Eelam
Whitley 47'; Caine 57'	Report

Colston Avenue, Carshalton
Referee: Mario Guastafierro

3 June 2018
15:00 BST

Barawa	2–0	Ellan Vannin
Bettamer 40'; Ismail 56'	Report

Coles Park, Haringey
Referee: Ivan Mrkalj
3 June 2018
15:00 BST

Tamil Eelam	0–6	Cascadia
	Report	Nouble 10' (pen.), 87'; Hayden-Smith 32', 71'; Farkas 69'; Ferguson 89'

St Paul's Sports Ground, Rotherhithe
Referee: Givi Todua

==== Group B ====
Team	Pld	W	D	L	GF	GA	GD	Pts	Qualification
Kárpátalja	3	2	1	0	8	2	+6	7	Advance to quarter-finals
Northern Cyprus	3	1	2	0	6	4	+2	5	Advance to quarter-finals
Abkhazia	3	1	1	1	5	4	+1	4	Advance to placement round
Tibet	3	0	0	3	2	11	−9	0	Advance to placement round

31 May 2018
12:00 BST

Abkhazia	3–0	Tibet
Akhvlediani 12'; Maskayev 61'; Shoniya 77'	Report

Queen Elizabeth II Stadium, Enfield
Referee: Raymond Mashamba
31 May 2018
15:00 BST

Northern Cyprus	1–1	Kárpátalja
Mehmet 13'	Report	I. Sándor 53'

Queen Elizabeth II Stadium, Enfield

2 June 2018
14:00 BST

Abkhazia	0–2	Kárpátalja
	Report	Gajdos 11'; I. Sándor 90+8'

Queen Elizabeth II Stadium, Enfield
Referee: Dmitrii Zhukov
2 June 2018
17:00 BST

Northern Cyprus	3–1	Tibet
Turan 2', 67'; Gök 73'	Report	Topgyal 38'

Queen Elizabeth II Stadium, Enfield
Referee: John McCallum

3 June 2018
15:00 BST

Abkhazia	2–2	Northern Cyprus
Maskayev 21'; Argun 90' (pen.)	Report	Kaya 27'; Oshan 77'

Queen Elizabeth II Stadium, Enfield
Referee: Dmitrii Zhukov
3 June 2018
15:00 BST

Kárpátalja	5–1	Tibet
Gajdos 2'; G. Sándor 36' (pen.); Takács 42', 77'; Svedjuk 75'	Report	Yougyal 69'

Larges Lane, Bracknell
Referee: Raymond Mashamba

==== Group C ====
Team	Pld	W	D	L	GF	GA	GD	Pts	Qualification
Padania	3	3	0	0	17	2	+15	9	Advance to quarter-finals
Székely Land	3	2	0	1	10	3	+7	6	Advance to quarter-finals
Matabeleland	3	1	0	2	4	12	−8	3	Advance to placement round
Tuvalu	3	0	0	3	1	15	−14	0	Advance to placement round

31 May 2018
12:00 BST

Székely Land	4–0	Tuvalu
Bajkó 23', 63', 68'; Magyari 75'	Report

Coles Park, Haringey
31 May 2018
15:00 BST

Padania	6–1	Matabeleland
Innocenti 10', 45'; Piantoni 39', 42'; Rosset 60'; Rota 61'	Report	Ndlela 78'

Gander Green Lane, Sutton

2 June 2018
14:00 BST

Székely Land	5–0	Matabeleland
Fülöp 31' (pen.); Györgyi 40'; Magyari 42', 54'; Hodgyai 90+1'	Report

Coles Park, Haringey
Referee: Igor Gorshkov
2 June 2018
17:30 BST

Padania	8–0	Tuvalu
Corno 8', 12', 38'; Ravasi 17'; Valente 32', 44', 89'; Rosset 71'	Report

Coles Park, Haringey
Referee: Raymond Mashamba

3 June 2018
18:00 BST

Padania	3–1	Székely Land
Rolandone 19'; Innocenti 27'; Pllumbaj 45'	Report	Szőcs 90'

Bedfont Recreation Ground, Bedfont
Referee: Fehim Dayı
3 June 2018
18:00 BST

Tuvalu	1–3	Matabeleland
Timuani 27'	Report	S. Ndlovu 25', 38'; Mlalazi 90+1' (pen.)

Coles Park, Haringey
Referee: Clément Auclair

==== Group D ====
Team	Pld	W	D	L	GF	GA	GD	Pts	Qualification
Western Armenia	3	2	1	0	5	0	+5	7	Advance to quarter-finals
Panjab	3	1	1	1	9	2	+7	4	Advance to quarter-finals
United Koreans in Japan	3	0	3	0	1	1	0	3	Advance to placement round
Kabylia	3	0	1	2	0	12	−12	1	Advance to placement round

31 May 2018
12:00 BST

United Koreans in Japan	0–0	Western Armenia
	Report

Colston Avenue, Carshalton
Referee: Fehim Dayı
31 May 2018
15:00 BST

Panjab	8–0	Kabylia
Sandhu 24', 53'; Purewal 45', 62'; G. Singh 51' (pen.), 90+3'; K. Singh 75', 82'	Report

Arbour Park, Slough

2 June 2018
14:00 BST

United Koreans in Japan	0–0	Kabylia
	Report

Larges Lane, Bracknell
Referee: Leon Dastych
2 June 2018
17:00 BST

Panjab	0–1	Western Armenia
	Report	Militosyan 14'

Arbour Park, Slough
Referee: Kristian Michel

3 June 2018
18:00 BST

Panjab	1–1	United Koreans in Japan
Purewal 77' (pen.)	Report	Mun 90+4'

Arbour Park, Slough
Referee: David Murphy
3 June 2018
18:00 BST

Western Armenia	4–0	Kabylia
Mosoyan 23'; Valenza-Berberian 61', 87'; Militosyan 89'	Report

Queen Elizabeth II Stadium, Enfield
Referee: Massimo Amitrano

=== Knockout stage ===
Quarter-finals
5 June – Sutton
Barawa	0
Northern Cyprus	8
5 June – Bracknell
Padania	2
Panjab	0
5 June – Sutton
Kárpátalja	3
Cascadia	1
5 June – Bromley
Western Armenia	0
Székely Land	4

Semi-finals
7 June – Carshalton
Northern Cyprus	3
Padania	2
7 June – Carshalton
Kárpátalja	4
Székely Land	2

Final
9 June – Enfield
Northern Cyprus	0 (2)
Kárpátalja	0 (3)
Third place
9 June – Enfield
Padania	0 (5)
Székely Land	0 (4)

==== Quarter-finals ====
5 June 2018
15:00 BST

Barawa	0–8	Northern Cyprus
	Report	Gök 15', 80'; Önet 51'; Turan 54', 69'; Ali 58' (o.g.); Mehmet 84'; Osman 88'

Gander Green Lane, Sutton
Referee: Ivan Mrki

5 June 2018
15:00 BST

Padania	2–0	Panjab
Innocenti 59' (pen.); Pavan 90'	Report

Larges Lane, Bracknell
Referee: Vitalii Mazin

5 June 2018
18:00 BST

Kárpátalja	3–1	Cascadia
Gyürki 49'; Takács 59'; Gajdos 87' (pen.)	Report	Haddadi 80'

Gander Green Lane, Sutton
Referee: Fehim Dayı

5 June 2018
18:00 BST

Western Armenia	0–4	Székely Land
	Report	Tankó 36'; Csizmadia 61'; L. Fülöp 65'; Bajkó 86'

Hayes Lane, Bromley
Referee: Givi Todua

==== Semi-finals ====
7 June 2018
17:00 BST

Northern Cyprus	3–2	Padania
Mehmet 36', 84'; Turan 80'	Report	Ravasi 30'; Pavan 47'

Colston Avenue, Carshalton
Referee: Dmitrii Zhukov

7 June 2018
20:00 BST

Kárpátalja	4–2	Székely Land
Toma 36', 57'; Gyürki 75' (pen.); Peres 90+1'	Report	Csizmadia 77'; Bajkó 79'

Colston Avenue, Carshalton
Referee: Mark Clattenburg

==== Third-place play-off ====
9 June 2018
15:00 BST

Padania	0–0	Székely Land
	Report
Penalties
	5–4

Queen Elizabeth II Stadium, Enfield
Referee: Utku Hamamcioglu

==== Final ====
9 June 2018
18:00 BST

Northern Cyprus	0–0	Kárpátalja
	Report
Penalties
Mehmet (penalty missed); Kurt (penalty missed); Oshan (penalty scored); Ersalan (penalty scored); Turan (penalty missed)	2–3	(penalty scored) Gyürki; (penalty scored) Toma; (penalty missed) Baksa; (penalty missed) I. Sándor; (penalty scored) Svedjuk

Queen Elizabeth II Stadium, Enfield
Referee: Mark Clattenburg

Northern Cyprus	Kárpátalja

ConIFA World Football Cup 2018 winners

Kárpátalja
First title

=== Placement Rounds ===
==== Placement Round 1 ====
5 June 2018
15:00 BST

Ellan Vannin (Note: Ellan Vannin withdrew from the tournament on 5 June. Tibet instead played a "London Turkish Select" team when this fixture was due to be played.)	0–3 Awarded	Tibet
	Report

Hayes Lane, Bromley
Referee: Mario Guastafierro

5 June 2018
15:00 BST

Matabeleland	0–0	Kabylia
	Report
Penalties
P. Ndlovu (penalty scored); Mlalazi (penalty missed); G. Ndlovu (penalty scored); George (penalty missed); Nkomo (penalty scored); Sthamburi (penalty missed)	3–4	(penalty scored) Belalsa (penalty missed); (penalty missed) Hadid (penalty scored) (penalty scored); (penalty scored) Mezaib

Queen Elizabeth II Stadium, Enfield
Referee: Kristian Michel

5 June 2018
18:00 BST

Abkhazia	6–0	Tamil Eelam
Akhvlediani 40', 71'; Logua 63'; Shoniya 74', 88'; Tarba 83'	Report

Parkside, Aveley
Referee: Karl Parker

5 June 2018
18:00 BST

United Koreans in Japan	5–0	Tuvalu
Taniyama 18'; Lee 20', 58'; Shin 23'; Mun 83'	Report

Larges Lane, Bracknell
Referee: Leon Dastych

==== Placement Round 2 ====
7 June 2018
12:00 BST

Ellan Vannin (Note: Chagos Islands agreed to fulfil Ellan Vannin's remaining fixtures.)	0–3 Awarded	Matabeleland
	Report

Parkside, Aveley

7 June 2018
12:00 BST

Tamil Eelam	4–3	Tuvalu
Ragavan 7', 86', 90+1'; Perananthan 90+4'	Report	Petoa 3', 73'; Vailine 55'

Gander Green Lane, Sutton
Referee: Leon Dastych

7 June 2018
12:00 BST

Tibet	1–8	Kabylia
Topgyal 43' (pen.)	Report	Baudia 25', 74', 77', 87'; Hadid 45'; Mezaib 49', 51'; Bouabbas 81'

Queen Elizabeth II Stadium, Enfield
Referee: Clément Auclair

7 June 2018
12:00 BST

Abkhazia	2–0	United Koreans in Japan
Akhvlediani 38'; Kogoniya 78'	Report

Hayes Lane, Bromley
Referee: Zekai Tore

7 June 2018
15:00 BST

Barawa	0–5	Panjab
	Report	K. Singh 8', 65', 72', 90+2'; Minhas 46'

Gander Green Lane, Sutton
Referee: David Murphy

7 June 2018
15:00 BST

Cascadia	4–0	Western Armenia
Ferguson 24', 62'; Oldham 54'; Farkas 79'	Report

Hayes Lane, Bromley
Referee: Ivan Mrkalj

==== Placement Round 3 ====
9 June 2018
12:00 BST

Ellan Vannin	0–3 Awarded	Tuvalu
	Report

Bedfont Recreation Ground, Bedfont

9 June 2018
12:00 BST

Matabeleland	1–0	Tamil Eelam
Ndlela 81'	Report

Parkside, Aveley
Referee: Vitalii Mazin

9 June 2018
12:00 BST

Tibet	1–1	United Koreans in Japan
Yougyal 20'	Report	Gelek 84' (o.g.)
Penalties
	1–4

St Paul's Sports Ground, Rotherhithe
Referee: Ivan Mrkalj

9 June 2018
15:00 BST

Kabylia	0–2	Abkhazia
	Report	Logua 29'; Zhanaa 56'

Parkside, Aveley
Referee: Kristian Michel

9 June 2018
15:00 BST

Barawa	0–7	Western Armenia
	Report	N. Hovsepyan; D. Hovsepyan; Yedigaryan; Guzel; Varjabetyan; Militosyan; Mosoyan

Coles Park, Haringey
Referee: Leon Dastych

9 June 2018
15:00 BST

Panjab	3–3	Cascadia
Virk 18'; Minhas 24', 34'	Report	Morales 45'; Ferguson 54', 60'
Penalties
Purewal (penalty missed); Zia (penalty missed); Virk (penalty scored); Dhillon (penalty scored); K. Singh (penalty scored); Jung (penalty scored)	4–3	(penalty missed) Riley; (penalty missed) Gregory; (penalty scored) J. Wilson; (penalty scored) Oldham; (penalty scored) Haddadi; (penalty missed) Levock

St Paul's Sports Ground, Rotherhithe
Referee: Mariano Sasso

== Statistics ==
=== Goalscorers ===
6 goals

- (Panjab) Kamaljit Singh

5 goals

- (Cascadia movement) Calum Ferguson
- (Northern Cyprus) Halil Turan
- (Székely Land) Barna Bajkó

4 goals

- (Abkhazia) Ruslan Akhvlediani
- (Kabylie) Sami Boudia
- (Northern Cyprus) Billy Mehmet
- (Padania) Giacomo Innocenti

3 goals

- (Abkhazia) Ruslan Shoniya
- (Kárpátalja) Zsolt Gajdos
- (Kárpátalja) Ronald Takács
- (Northern Cyprus) Uğur Gök
- (Padania) Federico Corno
- (Padania) Giulio Valente
- (Panjab) Nathan Minhas
- (Panjab) Amar Singh Purewal
- (Székely Land) Szilárd Magyari
- (Tamil Eelam) Prashanth Ragavan
- (Western Armenia) Vahagn Militosyan

2 goals

- (Abkhazia) Shabat Logua
- (Abkhazia) Dmitri Maskayev
- (Barawa) Mohamed Bettamer
- (Barawa) Shaun Lucien
- (Cascadia movement) Josh Doughty
- (Cascadia movement) Yuri Farkas
- (Cascadia movement) Tayshan Hayden-Smith
- (Cascadia movement) Hector Morales
- (Cascadia movement) Jon Nouble
- (Isle of Man) Sam Caine
- (Isle of Man) Stephen Whitley
- (Kabylie) Enzo Mezaib
- (Kárpátalja) Gergő Gyürki
- (Kárpátalja) István Sándor
- (Kárpátalja) György Toma
- (Matabeleland) Thabiso Ndlela
- (Matabeleland) Shylock Ndlovu
- (Padania) Gabriele Piantoni
- (Padania) Riccardo Ravasi
- (Padania) Nicolò Pavan
- (Padania) William Rosset
- (Panjab) Amarvir Sandhu
- (Panjab) Gurjit Singh
- (Székely Land) Csaba Csizmadia
- (Tibet) Kalsang Topgyal
- (Tibet) Tenzin Yougyal
- (Tuvalu) Alopua Petoa
- (United Koreans in Japan) Lee Tong-soung
- (United Koreans in Japan) Mun Su-hyeon
- (Western Armenia) Arman Mosoyan
- (Western Armenia) Vicken Valenza-Berberian

1 goal

- (Abkhazia) Vladimir Argun
- (Abkhazia) Aleksandr Kogoniya
- (Abkhazia) Georgi Zhanaa
- (Abkhazia) Astamur Tarba
- (Barawa) Gianni Crichlow
- (Barawa) Shaquille Ismail
- (Barawa) Solomon Sambou
- (Cascadia movement) Hamza Haddadi
- (Cascadia movement) Max Oldham
- (Isle of Man) Frank Jones
- (Isle of Man) Jack McVey
- (Kabylie) Nadjim Bouabbas
- (Kabylie) Ilyas Hadid
- (Kárpátalja) Csaba Peres
- (Kárpátalja) György Sándor
- (Kárpátalja) Alex Svedjuk
- (Matabeleland) Sipho Mlalazi
- (Northern Cyprus) Ünal Kaya
- (Northern Cyprus) Serhan Önet
- (Northern Cyprus) Kenan Oshan
- (Northern Cyprus) Tansel Osman
- (Padania) Ersid Pllumbaj
- (Padania) Gianluca Rolandone
- (Padania) Andrea Rota
- (Panjab) Rajpal Singh Virk
- (Székely Land) István Fülöp
- (Székely Land) Lóránd Fülöp
- (Székely Land) Arthur Györgyi
- (Székely Land) László Hodgyai
- (Székely Land) László Szőcs
- (Székely Land) Zsolt Tankó
- (Tamil Eelam) Janothan Perananthan
- (Tuvalu) Sosene Vailine
- (Tuvalu) Etimoni Timuani
- (United Koreans in Japan) Shin Yong-ju
- (United Koreans in Japan) Ken Taniyama
- (Western Armenia) Fabrice Guzel
- (Western Armenia) David Hovsepyan
- (Western Armenia) Norik Hovsepyan
- (Western Armenia) Zaven Varjabetyan
- (Western Armenia) Artur Yedigaryan

Own goals

- (Barawa) Ayuub Ali (for Northern Cyprus)
- (Tibet) Tenzin Gelek (for United Koreans in Japan)

== Final positions ==
Pos	Team	Pld	W	D	L	GF	GA	GD
1	Kárpátalja	6	4	2	0	15	5	+10
2	Northern Cyprus	6	3	3	0	17	6	+11
3	Padania	6	4	1	1	21	5	+16
4	Székely Land	6	3	1	2	16	7	+9
5	Panjab	6	2	2	2	17	7	+10
6	Cascadia	6	3	1	2	17	11	+6
7	Western Armenia	6	3	1	2	12	8	+4
8	Barawa	6	2	0	4	7	22	−15
9	Abkhazia	6	4	1	1	15	4	+11
10	Kabylia	6	1	1	4	8	15	−7
11	United Koreans in Japan	6	1	4	1	7	4	+3
12	Tibet	5	0	1	4	4	20	−16
13	Matabeleland	5	2	1	2	5	12	−7
14	Tamil Eelam	6	1	0	5	4	22	−18
15	Tuvalu	5	0	0	5	4	24	−20
16	Ellan Vannin (Note: Ellan Vannin withdrew from the competition after the group stage.)	3	2	0	1	6	3	+3

=== Player awards ===
Three individual awards were handed out by ConIFA at the conclusion of the tournament:

- Paddy Power Player of the Tournament: (Kárpátalja) Béla Fejér
- ConIFA Golden Boot: (Panjab) Kamaljit Singh
- Global FCE Young Player of the Tournament: (Kabylie) Sami Boudia

As winner of Young Player of the Tournament, Sami Boudia was offered a one-month residency at one of the Global Football Centre Of Excellence's academies.

== Marketing ==
=== Tournament programme ===
A programme for the entire tournament was produced, with the bulk of the content produced by football writer Mat Guy and blogger Pat McGuinness, and produced by Programme Master. The tournament is also documented in detail in the book CONIFA: Football For The Forgotten by journalist James Hendicott, which centres around events in London and the history of the teams involved.

=== Official anthem ===
The official anthem of the tournament is "Bring The House Down" by English duo Right Said Fred, which was released on 29 May 2018.

== Controversies ==
=== Ellan Vannin withdrawal ===
Following the completion of the group stage, Ellan Vannin entered a protest regarding the fact that Barawa had been able to bring in a replacement player to their squad after the tournament had started, in apparent contravention of the tournament's rules. The addition of the player, Mohamed Bettamer, a former Libyan youth international, was permitted by ConIFA, who stated that this was a rule change, but who did not inform the other 15 teams in the competition, who had submitted their own squad lists according to the published pre-tournament rule book. Ellan Vannin launched an appeal against the Barawa team's fielding of an apparently ineligible player, which at an initial meeting of the tournament committee was upheld, before subsequently being overturned. As a result, Ellan Vannin withdrew from the remainder of the tournament, and Tibet, their opponents in the First Placement Round, were awarded a 3–0 victory. Their place in the remaining fixtures were taken by Chagos Islands. A meeting of ConIFA's Executive Committee made the decision to provisionally expel the Manx Independent Football Alliance from the organization on 7 June, subject to ratification at the Annual General Meeting in January 2019. They were reinstated in January.

==== Replacement matches ====
5 June 2018
15:00 BST

London Turkish Select (Turkey)	4–0	Tibet
Nalbant; Ali Avci	Report

Hayes Lane, Bromley
Referee: Mario Guastafierro

7 June 2018
12:00 BST

Chagos Islands	0–1	Matabeleland
	Report	Sthamburi 60'

Parkside, Aveley
Referee: Massimo Amitrano

9 June 2018
12:00 BST

Chagos Islands	1–6	Tuvalu
Leonce 28' (pen.)	Report	Tinilau 8', 63'; Uaelasi 20', 81'; Oride 26' (o.g.); Vailine 71'

Bedfont Recreation Ground, Bedfont
Referee: Raymond Motumba

==== Goalscorers ====
3 goals

- (Turkey) Hassan Nalbant

2 goals

- (Tuvalu) Okilani Tinilau
- (Tuvalu) Matti Uaelasi

1 goal

- (Chagos Archipelago) Ivanov Leonce
- (Matabeleland) Musa Sthamburi
- (Turkey) Ali Uyar Avci
- (Tuvalu) Sosene Vailine

Own goals

- (Chagos Archipelago) Nicolas Oride (against Tuvalu)

== Broadcasting rights ==
CONIFA provided live streaming through football streaming service Mycujoo and edited highlights provided by FC Video. Select games were also live streamed on the Paddy Power Facebook page.

In Northern Cyprus the games were broadcast by EURO GENÇ TV.
