= Queen Elizabeth II Stadium (Enfield) =

Sports venue in Enfield, London, England

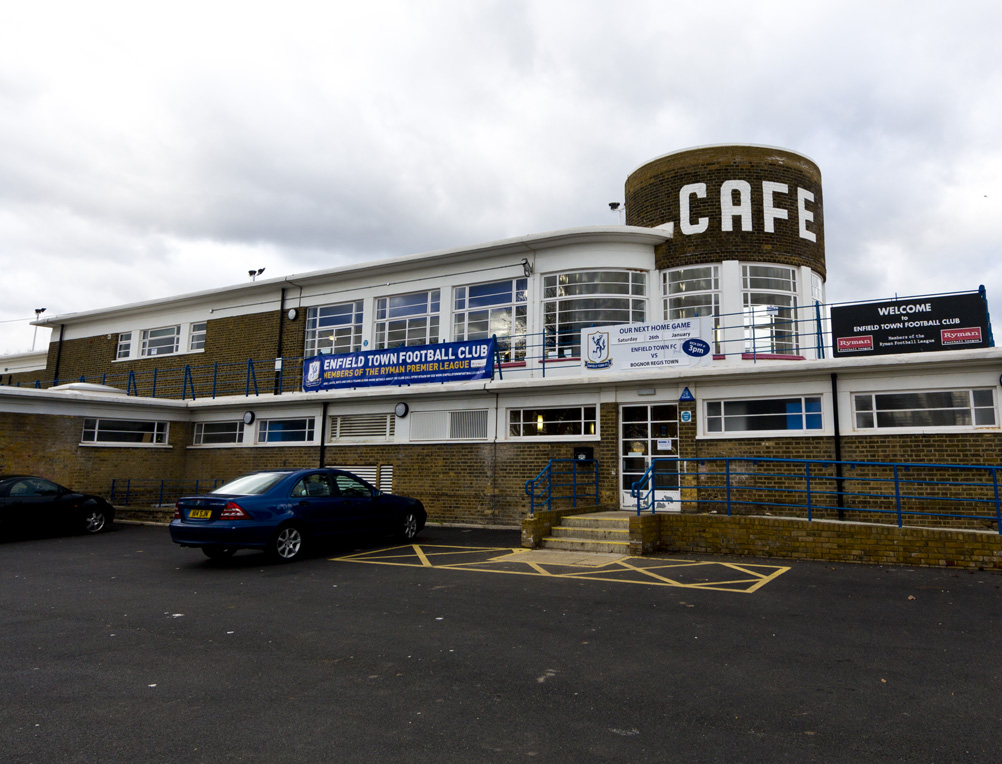
- Art Deco facade of the stadium's Grade II listed pavilion
- Interactive map of Queen Elizabeth II Stadium
- Full name: Queen Elizabeth Stadium
- Address: London; United Kingdom
- Location: Enfield, London, UK
- Coordinates: 51°39′33″N 0°3′50″W
- Owner: Enfield Council
- Capacity: 3000
- Type: Stadium
- Surface: Grass (pitch); Synthetic (running track)
- Public transit: Southbury; Enfield Town

Construction
- Groundbreaking: 1939
- Built: 1939–1953
- Opened: 1953
- Renovated: 2008–2011
- Architects: Frank Lee and Alec Mawson

Tenants
- Enfield Town Enfield and Haringey London Skolars Enfield Borough New Salamis: 2011–present 2014 (May–August); 2016–2018; 2018–2021

The Queen Elizabeth II Stadium, known for Enfield Town matches as the Dave Bryant Stadium, is a multi-use sports venue in Enfield, London. Built initially as a venue for athletics, in 2011 a three-year refurbishment was completed to allow the stadium to be used for football. The Stadium is a Grade II Listed Building.

== History ==
In 1939, construction of a new sports venue for Enfield began. The centerpiece was an athletics stadium, with additional space on the site for ball sports and a swimming pool. Due to the Second World War, work on the site was suspended, with the stadium not being completed until 1953. The athletics stadium, named after Queen Elizabeth II for her Silver Jubilee in 1977, was used as a training venue by a number of significant British athletes, including Sebastian Coe, Daley Thompson and Linford Christie, all of whom won Olympic titles.

By 2008, the venue had fallen into disuse. Enfield Town F.C., which had been formed in 2001, and who had been groundsharing with Brimsdown Rovers, came to an agreement with Enfield Council to refurbish the stadium for use as a multi-use venue, with the track being resurfaced and the stadium brought up to the standard required for football in the Isthmian League. Enfield Town moved to their new stadium in 2011, with their first official game taking place against a Tottenham Hotspur XI.

In 2014, during upgrades to the New River Stadium, the London Skolars played six home games at the QEII stadium during the second half of the rugby league season.

In 2018, the stadium was one of the venues for the 2018 ConIFA World Football Cup, with ten games played there: six group games, and four in the knockout round, including the final on 9 June 2018.

In 2024, the stadium was temporarily renamed in honour of founder chairman Dave Bryant, becoming The Dave Bryant Stadium until the end of the 2023/24 season, in which Enfield Town won promotion to the National League South for the first time. The name continued to be used the following season as Town avoided relegation from the National League South.

== Facilities ==
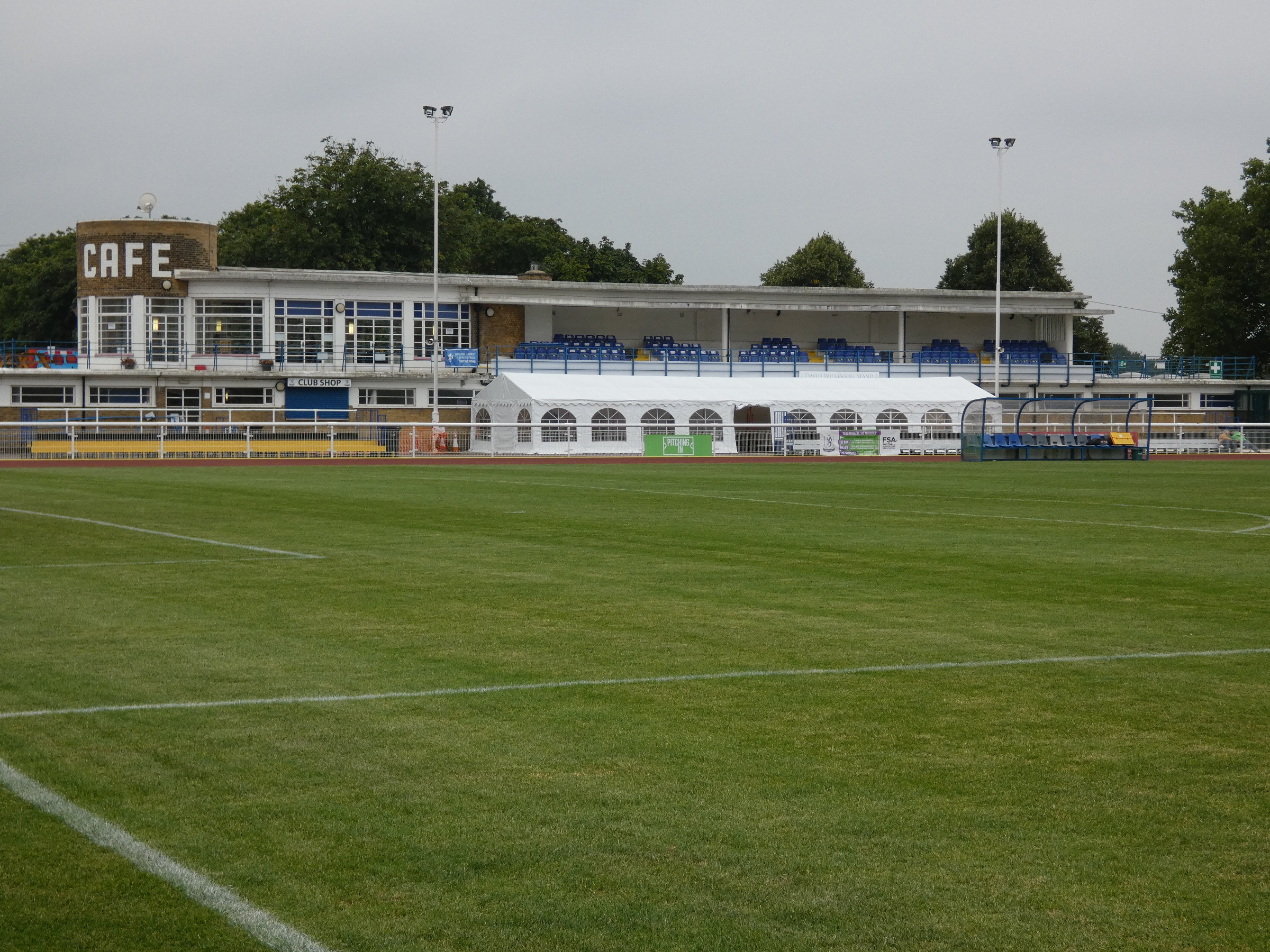
Queen Elizabeth II Stadium

The main element part of the stadium is the pavilion, completed in 1953. This is a Grade II listed building built in Art Deco style, and serves as the clubhouse, main stand and changing rooms. Butler's Bar serves fans on matchdays. Opposite the main stand is a second, small seated stand, while behind each goal, inside the perimeter of the running track, are two covered terraces.

The running track was reduced from eight lanes to six during the refurbishment from 2008 to 2010.

The stadium also has a club shop.

== International football ==
International football matches at the Queen Elizabeth II Stadium
Year	Date	Team 1	Result	Team 2	Attendance	Competition
2018	31 May	Abkhazia	3–0	Tibet	—	2018 ConIFA World Cup Group B
2018	31 May	Northern Cyprus	1–1	Kárpátalja	—	2018 ConIFA World Cup Group B
2018	2 June	Abkhazia	0–2	Kárpátalja	—	2018 ConIFA World Cup Group B
2018	2 June	Northern Cyprus	3–1	Tibet	—	2018 ConIFA World Cup Group B
2018	3 June	Northern Cyprus	2–2	Abkhazia	—	2018 ConIFA World Cup Group B
2018	3 June	Western Armenia	4–0	Kabylie	—	2018 ConIFA World Cup Group D
2018	5 June	Matabeleland	0–0 (3–4 p)	Kabylie	—	2018 ConIFA World Cup Placement Round 1
2018	7 June	Tibet	1–8	Kabylie	—	2018 ConIFA World Cup Placement Round 2
2018	9 June	Padania	0–0 (5–4 p)	Székely Land	—	2018 ConIFA World Cup 3rd-place play-off
2018	9 June	Kárpátalja	0–0 (3–2 p)	Northern Cyprus	—	2018 ConIFA World Cup Final
