= Panjab football team =

Representative football team of the Punjabi diaspora

Panjab
- Association: Football Association of Panjab
- Confederation: ConIFA
- Head coach: Manraj Singh Sucha
- Most caps: Amarvir Singh Sandhu (18)
- Top scorer: Amar Singh Purewal (10)
- Home stadium: [[]]
First colours	Second colours

First international
- Ellan Vannin 8–1 Panjab (Douglas, Isle of Man; 30 May, 2015)

Biggest win
- Panjab 9–1 Alderney (Douglas, Isle of Man; 31 May, 2015); Panjab 8–0 Kabylia (Slough, England; 31 May 2018)

Biggest defeat
- Ellan Vannin 8–1 Panjab (Douglas, Isle of Man; 30 May, 2015)

ConIFA World Football Cup
- Appearances: 2 (first in 2016)
- Best result: Runners-Up 2016
- Website: Panjab Football Association

The Panjab Football Team is a representative football team formed in 2014 in the United Kingdom to represent the Punjabi diaspora. The team is governed by the Football Association of Panjab, this is not to be confused with the Punjab Football Association, which is the state governing body of football in the Punjab state of India.

== Background ==
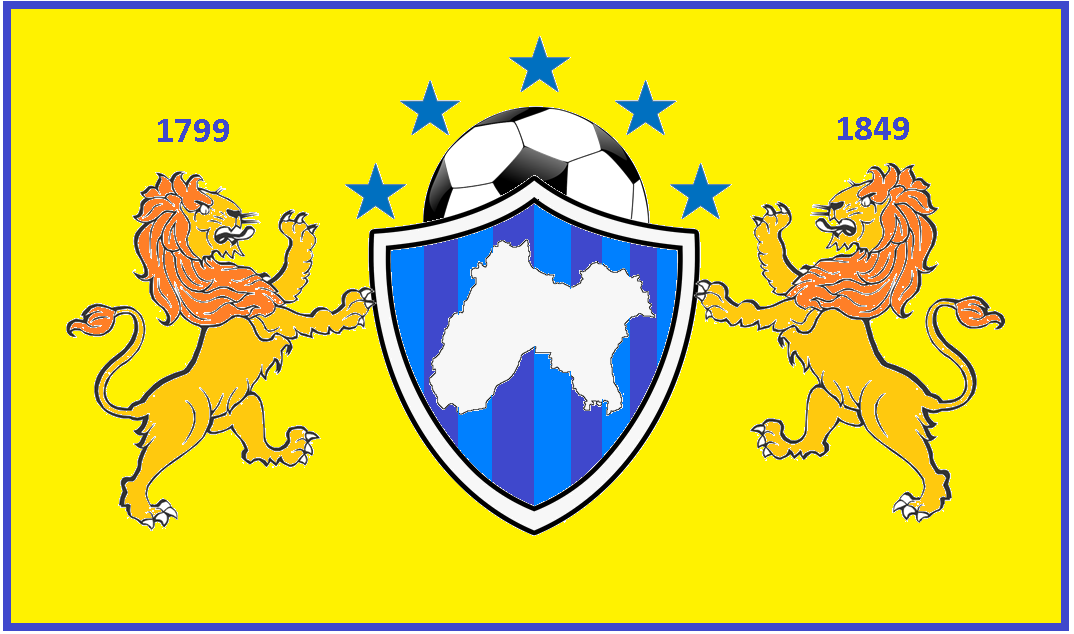
Panjab football team flag

The Panjab FA was founded in 2014 with the primary aim of establishing a team to represent the community of the Punjab across the world. The Punjab region is an area that stretches across parts of eastern Pakistan and northern India, and the association has aligned itself within the boundaries of this area, as represented by the Sikh Empire under Maharaja Ranjit Singh in the 19th century. To this end, the association applied for membership of the Confederation of Independent Football Associations (ConIFA), an international body designed to allow nations, unrecognised states, minorities, stateless peoples and others ineligible to join FIFA to take part in competitive international football. The Panjab FA joined ConIFA on 7 April 2014.

Following the establishment of the association and the confirmation of its membership of ConIFA, a series of trials was held in order to select the initial squad selection. The first of these took place in December 2014, with subsequent trials into 2015. On 22 December 2014, the first match organised by the Panjab FA saw a team of trialists take on the Sealand national "B" team, in which the Panjab XI won 4–1.

In early 2015, the association continued the development of its structures, with the recruitment of coaches and scouts, and the first full training session of the initial national squad. In May 2015, it was announced that the team would participate in its first full international fixtures when it was invited to take part in the Niamh Challenge Cup in the Isle of Man, a four team tournament that would not only provide the first international opposition for the team, but also provide a route to qualify for the 2016 ConIFA World Football Cup. The team was also due to participate in a second friendly tournament, the Benedikt Fontana Cup, held in Raetia, and which would provide a second opportunity to qualify for the WFC. However, they subsequently pulled out of this tournament, to be replaced by the Chagos Islands, the team will compete at the 2016 ConIFA World Football Cup.

== 2016 ConIFA World Football Cup ==
Panjab was selected as one of the twelve participants in the 2016 ConIFA World Football Cup in January 2016. At the subsequent draw, the team was placed in Group D alongside Sápmi and Somaliland. The team finished top of the group, before playing Western Armenia in the quarter-final, and Padania in the semi-final. Victory saw them face the hosts, Abkhazia in the final, where they led until the 88th minute before losing on penalties.

== 2018 ConIFA World Football Cup ==
The team also competed at the 2018 ConIFA World Football Cup, managed by Reuben Hazell.

== Matches ==
=== 2014 ===
22 December 2014 Friendly	Panjab XI	4–1	Sealand "B"	Hadley Stadium, Smethwick
14:00 GMT	Aaron Singh Dhillon 33'; Tarlochan Singh 41'; Sukhraj Singh Nijjar 52'; Amarvir Singh Sandhu 72'	Report	62' Dan Hughes

=== 2015 ===
30 May 2015 Niamh Challenge Cup	Ellan Vannin	8–1	Panjab	The Bowl, Douglas
15:00 BST	Sean Quaye 11', 37'; Ciaran McNulty 15'; Conor Doyle 44'; Frank Jones 50', 55'; Furo Davies 67'; Liam Doyle 75'		? 28'

31 May 2015 Friendly	Panjab	9–1	Alderney	The Bowl, Douglas
	?,		?

20 December 2015 International Friendly	Panjab	4–1	Chagos Islands	Central Ground, Sutton Coldfield
15:00 BST

=== 2016 ===
20 February 2016 Friendly	Leicester City FC International Academy	2–2	Panjab	Belvoir Drive, Leicester
12:00 BST

20 March 2016 Friendly	Manchester International Academy	1–9	Panjab	Salford Sports Village, Salford
13:00 BST

24 April 2016 International Friendly	Panjab	0–2	Jersey	Aggborough Stadium, Kidderminster
15:00 BST		Report	Luke Watson 49'; Karl Hinds 80'

30 May 2016 ConIFA WFC Group D	Sápmi	0–1	Panjab	Daur Akhvlediani Stadium, Gagra
15:00 GET		Report	8' Gurjit Singh

31 May 2016 ConIFA WFC Group D	Somaliland	0–5	Panjab	Daur Akhvlediani Stadium, Gagra
15:00 GET			30', 67', 80' Amar Purewal; 38' Arjun Purewal; 74' Gurjit Singh

2 June 2016 ConIFA WFC Quarter-Final	Western Armenia	2–3	Panjab	Dinamo Stadium, Sukhumi
20:00 GET

4 June 2016 ConIFA WFC Semi-Final	Padania	0–1	Panjab	Dinamo Stadium, Sukhumi
15:00 GET

5 June 2016 ConIFA WFC Final	Abkhazia	1–1 (6–5 p)	Panjab	Dinamo Stadium, Sukhumi
20:00 GET	Ruslan Shoniya 88'		57' Amar Purewal
	Penalties
	Anri Khagba (penalty scored); Anri Khagush (penalty missed); Dmitriy Akhba (penalty missed); Tarash Khagba (penalty scored); Ruslan Shoniya (penalty scored); Alan Khugaev (penalty scored); Shabat Logua (penalty scored); Vladimir Argun (penalty scored)		(penalty scored) Amar Purewal; (penalty scored) Radjpal Virk; (penalty scored) Terlochan Singh; (penalty missed) Karum Shanker; (penalty missed) Jhai Dhillon; (penalty scored) Aran Basi; (penalty scored) Amarvir Sandhu; (penalty missed) Aaron Minhas

=== 2017 ===
4 March 2017 Friendly	Leicester City FC International Academy	4–3	Panjab	Belvoir Drive, Leicester
13:00 GMT

23 April 2017 International Friendly	Jersey	0–2	Panjab	Springfield Stadium, Saint Helier
12:45 BST

28 May 2017 International Friendly	Panjab	1–2	England "C"	Aggborough Stadium, Kidderminster
15:00 BST

=== 2018 ===
8 April 2018 Friendly	Hashtag United F.C. (England)	2–1	Panjab	London, England
	Rich Beck 4'; George Vallentyne 75'		29'	Stadium: White Hart Lane Community Sports Centre; Attendance: 20

29 April 2018 International Friendly	Ellan Vannin	2–1	Panjab	Sandbach, England
				Stadium: Sandbach Community Football Centre

14 May 2018 Friendly	Liverpool F.C. Under 23	4–1	Panjab	Kirkby, Liverpool
	Lewis 24'; Ángel 31'; Kane 75'; Adekanye 84'	Report	Bhandel 19'	Stadium: Kirkby Academy Complex

19 May 2018 Friendly	Panjab	1–1	Jersey	Arbour Park, Slough
	G. Singh 88' (pen.)	Report	Curtis 72'

27 May 2018 Friendly	Panjab	8–0	(Bangladesh) Dhaka Akadash R.C.	Arbour Park, Slough

31 May 2018 ConIFA WFC Group D	Panjab	8–0	Kabylia	Arbour Park, Slough
15:00 BST	Sandhu 24', 53'; Purewal 45', 62'; G. Singh 51' (pen.), 90+3'; K. Singh 75', 82'	Report

2 June 2018 ConIFA WFC Group D	Panjab	0–1	Western Armenia	Arbour Park, Slough
17:00 BST		Report	Militosyan 14'	Referee: Kristian Michel

3 June 2018 ConIFA WFC Group D	Panjab	1–1	United Koreans in Japan	Arbour Park, Slough
18:00 BST	Purewal 77' (pen.)	Report	Mun 90+4'	Referee: David Murphy

5 June 2018 ConIFA WFC Quarter-Final	Padania	2–0	Panjab	Larges Lane, Bracknell
15:00 BST	Innocenti 59' (pen.); Pavan 90'	Report		Referee: Vitalii Mazin

7 June 2018 ConIFA WFC Placement Round 2	Barawa	0–5	Panjab	Gander Green Lane, Sutton
15:00 BST		Report	K. Singh 8', 65', 72', 90+2'; Minhas 46'	Referee: David Murphy

9 June 2018 ConIFA WFC Placement Round 3	Panjab	3–3 (4–3 p)	Cascadia	St Paul's Sports Ground, Rotherhithe
15:00 BST	Virk 18'; Minhas 24', 34'	Report	Morales 45'; Ferguson 54', 60'	Referee: Mariano Sasso
	Penalties
	Purewal (penalty missed); Zia (penalty missed); Virk (penalty scored); Dhillon (penalty scored); K. Singh (penalty scored); Jung (penalty scored)		(penalty missed) Riley; (penalty missed) Gregory; (penalty scored) J. Wilson; (penalty scored) Oldham; (penalty scored) Haddadi; (penalty missed) Levock

18 November 2018 International Friendly	Yorkshire	5–4	Panjab	Ingfield Stadium, Ossett
16:00 GMT

=== 2019 ===
6 March 2019 Friendly	Burton Albion F.C. Reserves	2–2	Panjab	Lilleshall National Sports Centre, Lilyhurst
19:45 GMT

15 June 2019 Friendly	Barry Town United F.C.	1–1	Panjab	Jenner Park Stadium, Barry, Vale of Glamorgan
19:45 GMT

29 December 2019 Friendly	Chagos Islands	0–6	Panjab	Camping World Community Stadium, Horsham
12:00

== Current squad ==
The following players were called up for the 2018 ConIFA World Football Cup. Caps and goals correct as of 21 May after the game against Jersey.

Head Coach: Manraj Singh Sucha

No.	Pos.	Player	Date of birth (age)	Caps	Goals	Club
12	GK	Raajan Singh Gill	15 August 1993 (age 32)	12	0	(The Football Association) Newcastle Town
1	GK	Yousuf Butt	18 October 1989 (age 36)	3	0	(Danish Football Association) Ishøj IF
6	DF	Jaskaran Singh Basi	21 March 1993 (age 33)	14	0	(The Football Association) Eccleshill United
3	DF	Jhai Singh Dhillon	2 April 1995 (age 31)	11	0	(The Football Association) Chesham United
5	DF	Arun Singh Purewal	28 October 1989 (age 36)	11	0	(The Football Association) Consett
15	DF	Glen Hayer	2 February 1998 (age 28)	6	0	(The Football Association) Clevedon Town
18	DF	Sufyan Zia	10 May 1997 (age 29)	4	0	(The Football Association) Bilston Town
11	MF	Amarvir Singh Sandhu	10 December 1995 (age 30)	18	3	(The Football Association) Leicester Road
2	MF	Umar Riaz	25 April 1991 (age 35)	15	2	(The Football Association) Burnham
8	MF	Aaron Minhas	8 January 1994 (age 32)	12	1	(The Football Association) Beaconsfield Town
16	MF	Terlochan Singh	20 October 1989 (age 36)	11	1	(The Football Association) Glebe
10	MF	Rajpal Singh Virk	8 April 1994 (age 32)	10	4	Unattached
4	MF	Camen Singh Bhandal	15 April 1994 (age 32)	6	1	(The Football Association) Punjab United
20	MF	Arjun Jung	12 April 1994 (age 32)	4	0	(The Football Association) Kings Langley
17	MF	Taimoor Hussain	21 June 1992 (age 34)	3	0	Unattached
9	FW	Amar Singh Purewal	28 October 1989 (age 36)	11	10	(The Football Association) West Auckland Town
14	FW	Gurjit Singh	9 February 1991 (age 35)	11	7	(The Football Association) Rushall Olympic
7	FW	Nathan Minhas	16 September 1997 (age 28)	5	0	(The Football Association) Maidenhead United
19	FW	Nikinder Uppal	18 April 1995 (age 31)	3	2	(The Football Association) Barnt Green Spartak
13	FW	Kamaljit Singh	3 September 1994 (age 31)	7	6	(German Football Association) Eintracht Nordhorn

== Managers ==
Manager	Period	Played	Won	Drawn	Lost	Win %
(England) Reuben Hazel	2014–2018	26	12	5	9	46.2
(England) Manraj Singh Sucha	2018–present	4	1	2	1	25.0
Totals		30	13	7	10	43.33

== Honours ==
=== Non-FIFA competitions ===
- CONIFA World Football Cup
  - Runners-up (1): 2016
