= Barawa football team =

English football team representing the Somali diaspora

Barawa
- Confederation: ConIFA; World Unity Football Alliance
- Head coach: Abdikarim Farah
- Captain: Omar Sufi
- Most caps: Omar Sufi (18)
- Top scorer: Kingsley Eshun (8)
First colours	Second colours

First international
- Barawa 0–5 Tamil Eelam (Sutton, England; 25 August 2016)

Biggest win
- Barawa 4–0 Tamil Eelam (Bromley, England; 31 May 2018)

Biggest defeat
- Barawa 0–8 Northern Cyprus (Sutton, England; 5 June 2018)

ConIFA World Football Cup
- Appearances: 1 (first in 2018)
- Best result: 8th, 2018

The Barawa football team is the football team representing the Somali diaspora in England. It is named after Barawa, a port town in Somalia. It hosted the 2018 ConIFA World Football Cup.

== History ==
The Barawa Football Association was developed in 2015. Using football as a tool, the aim is to highlight Barawanese culture around the world and actively redevelop football in the southern region of Somalia. Barawa was admitted into ConIFA in June 2016.

In June 2017, at the ConIFA meeting held during the 2017 ConIFA European Football Cup, it was announced that the Barawa Football Association had been selected to act as the host for the 2018 World Football Cup. However, under ConIFA's criteria, the "host" is the ConIFA member that heads the organising committee for the tournament, which does not necessarily mean that it needs to be played in the host's territory. Barawa is located in Somalia, but the Barawa FA represents members of the Somali diaspora in England. The 2018 CONIFA World Football Cup, hosted by the Barawa FA, was held in England.

== World Cup record ==
Year	Position	P	W	D	L	F	A
ConIFA World Football Cup
(Sápmi) 2014	did not enter						
(Abkhazia) 2016	did not qualify						
(Barawa) 2018	8th	6	2	0	4	7	22
Total	Best: 8th	6	2	0	4	7	22

== Fixtures and results ==
Win Draw Loss

=== 2016 ===
25 August 2016 World Unity Cup	Barawa	0–5	Tamil Eelam	Sutton, London
15:30 GMT				Stadium: Gander Green Lane; Attendance: 627; Referee: Steve Lynch

26 August 2016 World Unity Cup	Barawa	2–3	Chagos Islands	Sutton, London
15:30 GMT				Stadium: Gander Green Lane; Attendance: 627; Referee: Steve Lynch

28 August 2016 World Unity Cup	Barawa	3–2	Tamil Eelam	Sutton, London
15:30 GMT				Stadium: Gander Green Lane; Attendance: 627; Referee: Steve Lynch

=== 2018 ===
18 February 2018 Friendly	Hashtag United F.C. (England)	0–0	Barawa	London, England
				Stadium: White Hart Lane Community Sports Centre

8 April 2018 Friendly	Barawa	4–1	Chagos Islands	London, England
				Stadium: Coles Park, Haringey

15 April 2018 Friendly	Barawa	2–7	Yorkshire	London, England
				Stadium: Coles Park, Haringey

6 May 2018 Friendly	Surrey	3–1	Barawa	London, England
	Thomas; Sullivan; Nutt		Eshun	Stadium: St. Paul's Sports Ground, Rotherhithe

27 May 2018 Friendly	Barawa	3–3	Carlton Cole Select XI	London, England
	Eshun; Tajbakhsh; Noel		Goal	Stadium: Unknown

31 May 2018 2018 ConIFA World Football Cup	Barawa	4–0	Tamil Eelam	London, England
	Sambou 17'; Lucien 30' (pen.), 80' (pen.); Crichlow 43'			Stadium: Hayes Lane, Bromley

2 June 2018 2018 ConIFA World Football Cup	Barawa	1–2	Cascadia	London, England
	Bettamer 9'		Doughty 35'; Morales 45+1'	Stadium: Colston Avenue, Carshalton

3 June 2018 2018 ConIFA World Football Cup	Barawa	2–0	Ellan Vannin	London, England
	Bettamer 40'; Ismail 56'			Stadium: Coles Park, Haringey

5 June 2018 2018 ConIFA World Football Cup	Barawa	0–8	Northern Cyprus	London, England
			Gök 15', 80'; Önet 51'; Turan 54', 69'; Ali 58' (o.g.); Mehmet 84'; Ekingen 88'	Stadium: Gander Green Lane, Sutton

7 June 2018 2018 ConIFA World Football Cup	Barawa	0–5	Panjab	London, England
			K. Singh 8', 65', 72', 90+2'; Minhas 46'	Stadium: Gander Green Lane, Sutton

9 June 2018 2018 ConIFA World Football Cup	Barawa	0–7	Western Armenia	London, England
				Stadium: Coles Park, Haringey

=== 2019 ===
6 April 2019 Friendly	Barawa	2–7	(England) Ealing Town FC	London, England
				Stadium: Park Club, Ealing

25 May 2019 Friendly	Kernow	5–0	Barawa	Bodmin, England
				Stadium: Priory Park

=== 2021 ===
16 May 2021 WUFA World Series Semi-Final	Barawa	3–1	(Morocco) Maghreb	Guildford, Surrey
15:00 BST				Stadium: Merrist Wood College

23 May 2021 WUFA World Series: Final	Chagos Islands	2–2 (5–4 p)	Barawa	Guildford, Surrey
TBC BST				Stadium: Merrist Wood College

== Squad ==
The following players were called up to the final 23 man squad for the 2018 ConIFA World Football Cup. Caps and goals up to date as of 4 June 2018 after the game against Northern Cyprus.

Head Coach: Abdikarim Farah

No.	Pos.	Player	Date of birth (age)	Caps	Goals	Club
1	GK	Calvin King	18 June 1993 (aged 24)	6	0	Unattached
22	GK	Hafed Al Droubi	30 March 1995 (aged 23)	2	0	(The Football Association) Chesham United
5	DF	Ayuub Ali	6 January 1997 (aged 21)	10	0	(The Football Association) Brimsdown
4	DF	Zakaria Bachi	24 March 1999 (aged 19)	9	0	(The Football Association) Kensington Borough
2	DF	Courtney Austin	11 November 1997 (aged 20)	8	0	(The Football Association) Southall
18	DF	Said Tahir	2 June 1998 (aged 20)	8	0	Unattached
3	DF	Tarik Kwon	1 September 1999 (aged 18)	3	0	Unattached
6	MF	Omar Sufi (captain)	16 June 1993 (aged 24)	18	0	Unattached
10	MF	Ridwan Hussein	6 January 1998 (aged 20)	12	3	(The Football Association) Hadley
17	MF	Shaquille Ismail	19 November 1999 (aged 18)	11	3	(The Football Association) Boreham Wood
15	MF	Gianni Crichlow	6 May 1998 (aged 20)	5	1	(The Football Association) Hendon
20	MF	Aryan Tajbakhsh	27 October 1990 (aged 27)	5	1	(The Football Association) Maidstone United
7	MF	Shaun Lucien	11 March 1992 (aged 26)	4	2	(The Football Association) Hendon
12	MF	Frank Keita	15 July 1998 (aged 19)	4	0	(The Football Association) Harrow Borough
13	MF	Walid Mahamud Hirsi	2 January 1981 (aged 37)	4	0	(The Football Association) Kensington Borough
8	MF	Solomon Sambou	12 December 1995 (aged 22)	3	1	(The Football Association) St Albans City
16	MF	Wadah Ahmidi	6 July 1991 (aged 26)	3	0	Retired
23	MF	Mohamed Arale	10 March 2000 (aged 18)	2	0	(The Football Association) Hanworth Villa
14	FW	Jeylani Sufi	7 May 1987 (aged 31)	13	6	(The Football Association) London Rangers
21	FW	Dahir Ali	12 September 2000 (aged 17)	12	6	Unattached
9	FW	Simon Noel	2 October 1984 (aged 33)	7	1	Unattached
19	FW	Mohamed Bettamer	1 April 1993 (aged 25)	4	2	(The Football Association) Barnet
24	FW	Abulfat Aliyev	3 January 1979 (aged 39)	0	0	(Association of Football Federations of Azerbaijan) Bakili

=== Recent callups ===
Pos.	Player	Date of birth (age)	Caps	Goals	Club	Latest call-up
GK	Mohamed Sufi	14 October 1997 (aged 20)	0	0	(Kenya) Dortmund Youth	2018 ConIFA World Football Cup^{PRE}
DF	Mahad Mohamed	13 August 1994 (age 31)	8	2	Unattached	2018 ConIFA World Football Cup^{WD}
DF	Ahmed Alhad	26 November 1997 (age 28)	3	0	(England) Braintree Town	2018 ConIFA World Football Cup^{PRE}
DF	Abdi Karim Shidane	11 April 1990 (age 36)	3	0	Unattached	2018 ConIFA World Football Cup^{PRE}
DF	Kamaron Ali	20 February 1995 (age 31)	2	0	Unattached	2018 ConIFA World Football Cup^{PRE}
DF	Abdulkadir Abubakar	26 November 1997 (age 28)	0	0	(Kenya) Dortmund Youth	2018 ConIFA World Football Cup^{PRE}
DF	Abdulahi Alwashani	21 April 1995 (age 31)	0	0	(Saudi Arabia) Jeddah Stars	2018 ConIFA World Football Cup^{PRE}
DF	Abdulrahman Alwashani	12 November 1998 (age 27)	0	0	(Saudi Arabia) Jeddah Stars	2018 ConIFA World Football Cup^{PRE}
MF	Luca Dawrika	7 July 1994 (age 32)	3	4	Unattached	2018 ConIFA World Football Cup^{WD}
MF	Jesse Debrah	1 May 2000 (age 26)	1	0	(England) Millwall	2018 ConIFA World Football Cup^{WD}
MF	Mohammad Mahamud	21 February 1999 (age 27)	7	2	(England) Cockfosters	2018 ConIFA World Football Cup^{PRE}
MF	Jeylani Muktar	30 January 1989 (age 37)	0	0	(Kenya) Dortmund Youth	2018 ConIFA World Football Cup^{PRE}
FW	Kingsley Eshun	7 May 1999 (age 27)	9	8	(England) Queens Park Rangers	2018 ConIFA World Football Cup^{WD}
FW	Ody Alfa	9 March 1999 (age 27)	1	0	(England) Queens Park Rangers	2018 ConIFA World Football Cup^{WD}
FW	Vadim Agaragimov	10 March 1996 (aged 22)	0	1	(Russia) Zenit Saint Petersburg	2018 ConIFA World Football Cup^{PRE}

== Managers ==
Manager	Period	Played	Won	Drawn	Lost	Win %
(Somalia) Abdikarim Farah	2016–20..	16	4	2	10	25.0
Totals		16	4	2	10	25
