= Gander Green Lane =

Football stadium in Sutton, south London

Coordinates: 51°22′03″N 0°12′16″W

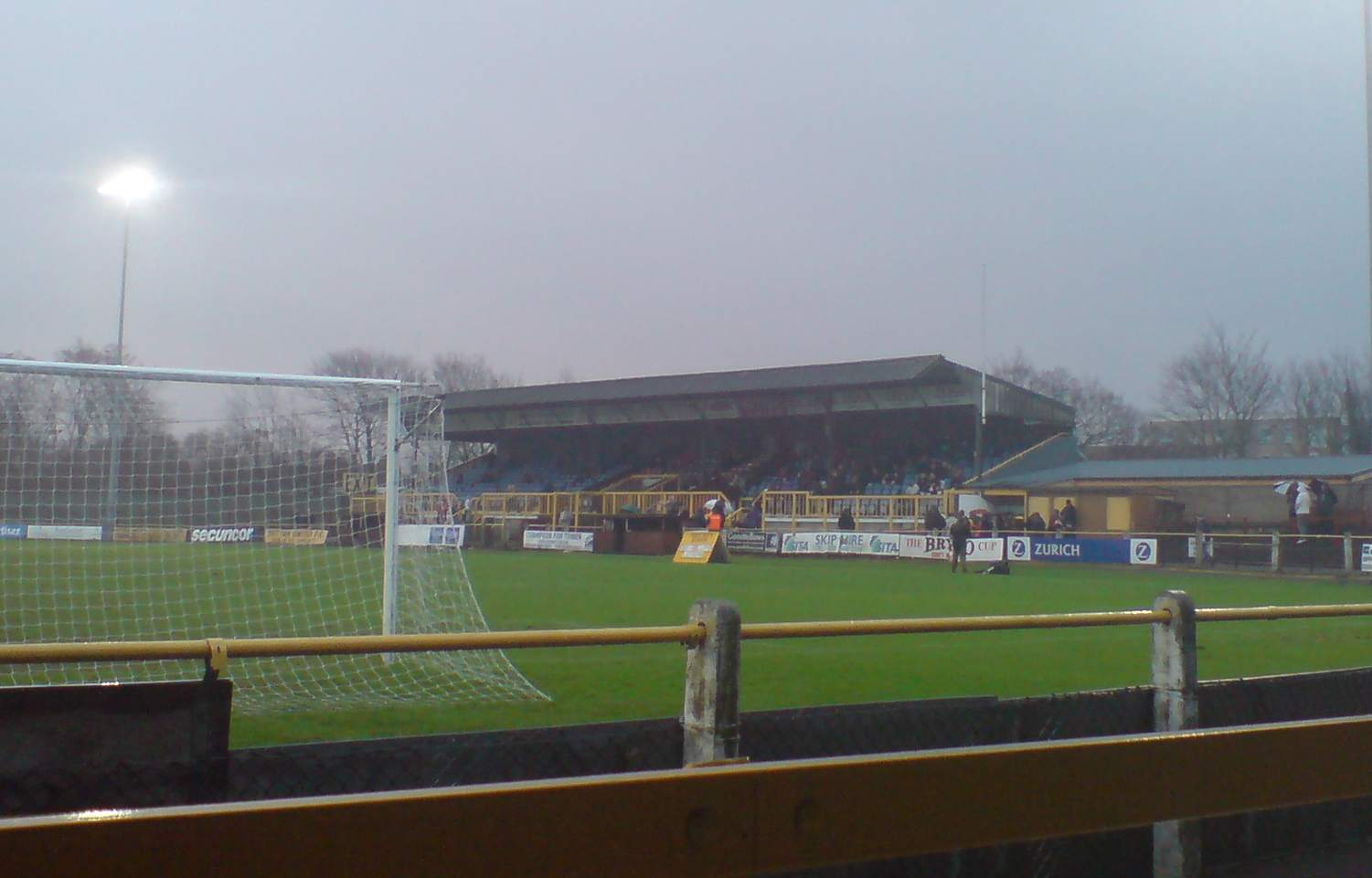
- Interactive map of Gander Green Lane
- Location: Sutton, England
- Owner: Sutton United
- Capacity: 7,032 (1,132 seated)
- Surface: GrassMaster (Hybrid Surface)
- Record attendance: 14,000
- Public transit: West Sutton (0.1mi)

Construction
- Built: 1898
- Opened: 1912

Tenants
- Sutton United (1912–1913; 1919–present); Sutton Common Rovers (2015–2021); Crystal Palace Women (2023–present)

Gander Green Lane, currently known as the 360 Engage Stadium for sponsorship reasons, is a football stadium in Sutton, Greater London, and is the home ground of Sutton United Football Club and Crystal Palace Women. The record attendance for Gander Green Lane is 14,000 when Sutton United lost 6–0 to Leeds United in the fourth round of the 1969–70 FA Cup.

In recent times the pitch has played host to England C team and FA Sunday Cup matches. From 2015 the surface was a FIFA 2-Star quality 3G pitch, FIFA's highest rating for 3G artificial pitches, but after winning promotion in 2021, Football League playing surface regulations obliged Sutton to replace the 3G surface with grass. During the 2021–22 pre-season, the club installed a hybrid grass "PowerGrass" pitch. During the 2024–25 pre-season, the pitch was replaced again with a new "GrassMaster" hybrid surface, as it was announced that Crystal Palace Women had signed a long-term agreement to play their home games at Gander Green Lane.

== History ==
During the 19th century, the Gander Green Lane site was used as allotments and open fields. The ground was originally developed during the Edwardian period. A 1913 map shows the ground designated as a "Football Ground" with a small pavilion on the northern side of the pitch and a turnstile entrance in the north-western corner via the Collingwood Recreation Ground. The ground was bounded by trees on three sides with a large residential building, Strawberry Lodge (formerly Strawberry House), to the west. To the north and east is the recreation ground and to the south was a field and pit described as a "Brick Field", which was used as a local brickworks. By 1937, Strawberry Lodge had been demolished and replaced by terraced houses, the brick field replaced by the railway line through West Sutton, a second pavilion added to the northern side of the pitch and a further pavilion erected in the south-eastern corner. None of the original pavilions survive today.

Sutton United's first match at Gander Green Lane (then known as the Adult School Sports Ground) was in 1912 against Guards Depot F.C. in the FA Cup. The first league match was against Redhill and was won 1–0 in front of a crowd of over 800. Sutton left the ground at the end of the 1912–13 season as the ground became unavailable due to Sutton Adult School forming their own team. United returned to Gander Green Lane in August 1919.

The Main Stand (or Grandstand) was built in 1951, although it has been altered throughout the years. The stand's red and blue seats, which do not reflect the club's colours, were donated by Chelsea.

In the 1980s, two small wooden stands were replaced by a covered standing terrace, known as the "Rec Terrace" because it is on the Collingwood Recreation Ground side of the pitch, on top of which is a covered television filming box used by SUFCtv. A small remnant of one of the original wooden stands remained for nearly 40 years, next to the Rec Terrace, and was known by Sutton supporters as the "Shoebox".

On 7 January 1989, the Lane hosted an FA Cup match against top division Coventry City, which Sutton won to create one of the biggest upsets in FA Cup history, in front of a sell-out crowd of approximately 8,000 supporters.

In 1997, the Gander Green Lane end of the stadium was levelled off and new terracing was installed.

On 10 July 2002, the ground played host to AFC Wimbledon's first match following the relocation of Wimbledon F.C. to Milton Keynes. In a pre-season friendly, Sutton defeated the reformed Dons 4–0 in front of a large crowd of 4,657.

In addition to football, the ground was used in the past for athletics. To fix the effects of the terraces being further away from the pitch than usual, in 2014 the ground was refurbished: the athletics track was removed and new dugouts and player tunnels were built; to move some of the stands closer to the pitch, new covered standing terraces were built behind each goal on the eastern and western sides of the pitch. The oval curvature of the two open standing terraces which sweep around the western side of the pitch allude to the ground's former use for athletics.

On 22 April 2015, Sutton United announced that Sutton Common Rovers would be ground sharing Gander Green Lane from the start of the 2015–16 season. In the summer of 2015 a new artificial pitch was installed, and was officially opened on 14 July 2015 by Alan Pardew, former manager of Crystal Palace.

Gander Green Lane was officially renamed the Knights Community Stadium in 2017 after the club agreed a 3-year sponsorship deal with the Knights Foundation, who in return ran Sutton United's academy until 2020. In 2020 the name reverted to the Borough Sports Ground. As of Saturday 7 August 2021, The Borough Sports Ground will be formally known as the ‘VBS Community Stadium’. This 4-season deal takes the sponsorship through to 31 July 2025.

Following Sutton United's promotion to the English Football League in 2021, a number of large scale changes had to take place to bring the ground up to EFL ground grading. The artificial pitch was torn up and replaced by grass, the Shoebox was demolished, a new stand was constructed in the away end, and new floodlights and turnstiles were installed.

The main hall, currently known as the MBA Lounge, is home to the Boom Boom Club music venue.

== International football ==
Year	Date	Team 1	Result	Team 2	Attendance	Part of
2016	25 August	Barawa	0–5	Tamil Eelam		2016 World Unity Cup
2016	26 August	Barawa	2–3	Chagos Islands		2016 World Unity Cup
2016	28 August	Chagos Islands	1–5	Tamil Eelam		2016 World Unity Cup

In 2018 Gander Green Lane was one of 10 venues used in the 2018 ConIFA World Football Cup, hosting six games including two group stage games.

Year	Date	Team 1	Result	Team 2	Attendance	Part of
2018	31 May	(Isle of Man) Ellan Vannin	4–1	Cascadia		2018 ConIFA World Football Cup Group A
2018	31 May	Padania	6–1	Matabeleland		2018 ConIFA World Football Cup Group C
2018	5 June	Barawa	0–8	Northern Cyprus		2018 ConIFA World Football Cup Quarter-Final
2018	5 June	Kárpátalja	3–1	Cascadia		2018 ConIFA World Football Cup Quarter-Final
2018	7 June	Tamil Eelam	4–3	Tuvalu		2018 ConIFA World Football Cup Placement Round 2
2018	7 June	Barawa	0–5	(Sikh Empire) Panjab		2018 ConIFA World Football Cup Placement Round 2

== Future Upgrades ==
For the 2024–25 season these upgrades have been made:

- Installation of a new pitch.
- Creation of a Fanzone beyond the Collingwood Road Stand, offering activities, refreshments, and music.
- Designation of specific areas for home and away fans, with improvements to the fan zone and additional bars.
- Expansion from 500 to over 4,000 seats on match days.
- Allocation of yellow seats in the Ideal Medical Solutions Stand as a Family Enclosure, with no pedestrian route in front.
- Permitted standing at specific areas, monitored by stewards.
