= Joel Nouble =

English footballer (born 1996)

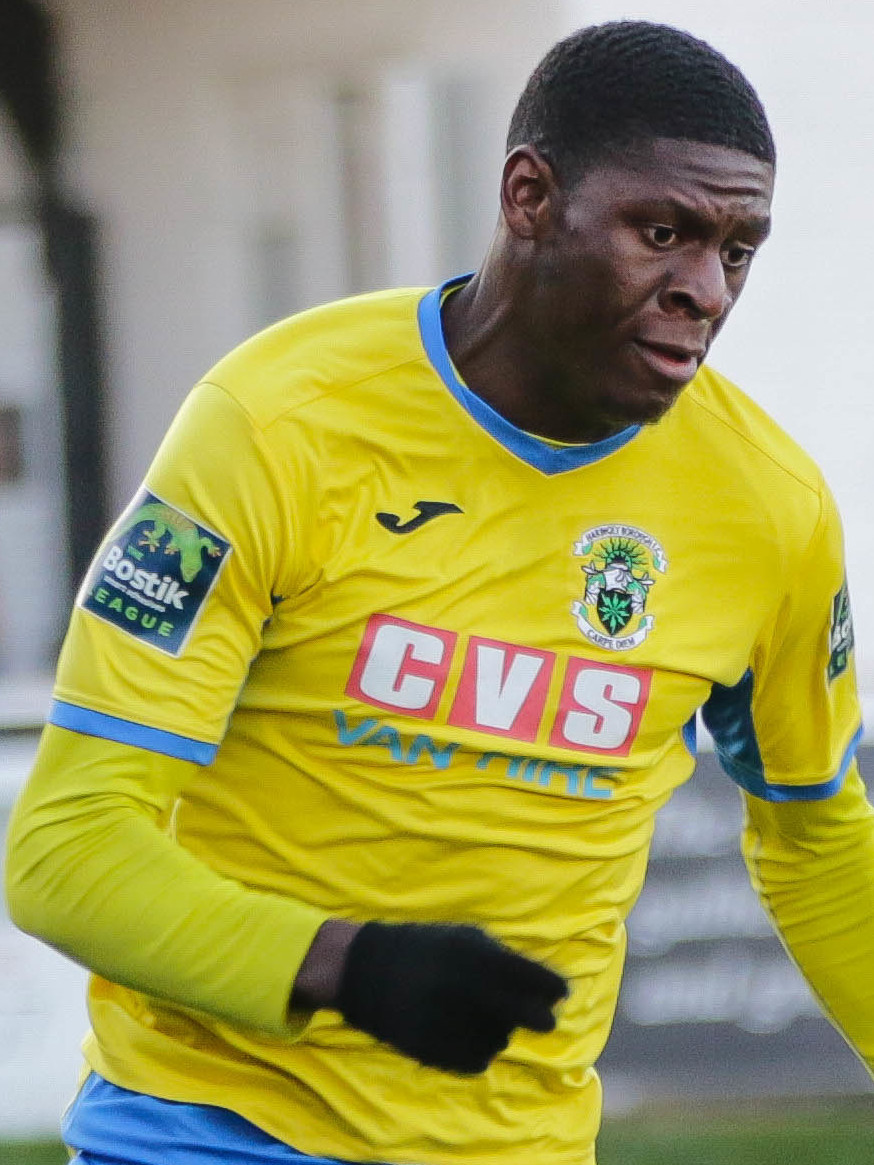
- Nouble playing for Haringey Borough in November 2018

Personal information
- Full name: Joel Jonathan Nouble
- Date of birth: 19 January 1996 (age 30)
- Place of birth: Deptford, England
- Height: 1.93 m (6 ft 4 in)
- Position: Forward

Team information
- Current team: Shenzhen Juniors
- Number: 38

Youth career
- Chelsea
- Millwall
- 2011–2013: Dagenham & Redbridge

Senior career*
Years	Team	Apps	(Gls)
2013–2015	Dagenham & Redbridge	1	(0)
2013	→ Thurrock (loan)	8	(2)
2013–2014	→ Grays Athletic (loan)	28	(7)
2014	→ Welling United (loan)	12	(0)
2014	→ St Albans City (loan)	5	(1)
2014–2015	→ Thurrock (loan)	3	(1)
2015	→ Grays Athletic (loan)	8	(0)
2016–2017	Bishop's Stortford	4	(0)
2017	Grays Athletic	5	(0)
2017–2018	Thurrock	37	(4)
2018–2019	Haringey Borough	39	(16)
2019–2020	Concord Rangers	26	(8)
2020–2021	Aldershot Town	31	(5)
2021–2024	Livingston	78	(8)
2021–2022	→ Arbroath (loan)	20	(4)
2024	Wuxi Wugo	15	(2)
2025	Shenzhen Juniors	17	(10)
2026	Livingston	10	(1)
2026–	Shenzhen Juniors	0	(0)

International career
2018	Cascadia	2	(2)
- * Club domestic league appearances and goals as of 20 May 2026

Joel Jonathan Nouble (born 19 January 1996) is an English professional footballer who plays for China League One club Shenzhen Juniors.

== Career ==
Nouble started his career in the Youth systems at Chelsea and Millwall before being offered a scholarship by Dagenham & Redbridge in November 2011 and joined the club's academy programme in June 2012. In the summer of 2013 he featured in two pre-season friendlies for the first team before joining Isthmian League Division One North side Thurrock on work experience in August. He scored on his debut with the equaliser in the 3–1 defeat to AFC Sudbury. Two weeks later he scored the first in the 5–1 win over Harlow Town. His final goal of the loan spell came in a 3–0 win over Felixstowe & Walton United in the FA Cup. Nouble returned to the Daggers in September having made eleven appearances scoring three goals.

In November 2013, he joined Isthmian League Premier Division side Grays Athletic on loan. He made his debut for the club in the victory over Tilbury in the Isthmian League Cup, coming on as a substitute for Jeff Hammond and scoring with only his second touch. His first goal in the league came in a 3–2 defeat to Dulwich Hamlet. He scored in the 3–3 draw with Chatham Town as Grays progressed through to the semi-finals of the Isthmian League Cup on penalties. He scored his first ever brace in the 4–2 home league win over Lewes. He scored his first penalty in the 2–1 away win at AFC Hornchurch. He went on to score in the 2–2 draw with Harrow Borough. He scored the equaliser in the 1–1 draw away at Lowestoft Town with a penalty. His final goal of his loan spell came in April 2014, a 3–2 away win over Hendon. He returned to the Daggers later that month having made thirty-two appearances, scoring nine goals.

In April 2014, Nouble was offered his first professional contract with Dagenham, signing a one-year contract. He made his debut for the Daggers in May 2014, coming on as a substitute for Blair Turgott in the 3–2 away win over Cheltenham Town. He was also later voted the Dagenham & Redbridge Academy Player of the Year award for the 2013–14 season. In August 2014, he joined Conference Premier side Welling United on a one-month loan, having found it difficult to break into the first team despite featuring in pre-season friendlies. He made his debut for the club in a 1–1 draw with Woking, replacing Afolabi Obafemi as a substitute. In September 2014, his loan was extended with the club for a further month. He was recalled from his loan by Dagenham in November 2014, having made thirteen appearances for the club. He subsequently joined Conference South side St Albans City on an initial one-month youth loan. He scored his only goal for the club in a 3–2 home defeat to Farnborough. He returned to Dagenham in December 2014, having made seven appearances in all competitions for the club. Later in the month he returned on loan to former side Thurrock of the Isthmian League Division One North for an initial one month. He made his second debut for the club against Heybridge Swifts in a 1–0 defeat. He scored in the 3–0 away win over Cray Wanderers with a delicate chip, in which turned out to be his final game of the loan spell, having made three appearances. In January 2015, he moved out on loan again to former club Grays Athletic of the Isthmian League Premier Division on a one-month youth loan. Nouble was released by Dagenham at the end of the 2014–15 season.

In July 2016, he joined National League South side Bishop's Stortford on a free transfer having suffered over a year with injuries since his release from Dagenham. Later that season he re-joined Grays Athletic. Nouble spent the 2017-18 season with Thurrock, leaving the club at the end of the season when they folded, before initially joining Tonbridge Angels in May 2018. However, the move was called off before the start of the coming season due to his personal circumstances. Nouble instead signed for Haringey Borough, and after 18 goals in the 2018-19 season, move up a division to join Concord Rangers the following summer. In July 2020 he progressed up a level again to join Aldershot Town.

In July 2021, Nouble signed for Livingston on a two-year deal with an option for a third. He then immediately joined Arbroath on a season-long loan. Nouble was recalled from loan in the January 2022 transfer window.

Following his departure from Livi, Nouble signed for Wuxi Wugo in June 2024. He scored twice in 15 appearances for Wuxi in the 2024 season, as they were relegated from League One.

After Wuxi were relegated, Nouble announced on Instagram that he had moved to Shenzhen Juniors, who were newly promoted to League One.

In February 2026, Nouble returned to Scottish Premiership club Livingston on a short-term deal until the end of the season. He left Livi in May 2026 following the expiration of his contract.

On 28 July 2026, Nouble has returned to Shenzhen Juniors.

== International career ==
Nouble made his international debut for Cascadia at the 2018 ConIFA World Football Cup, as a late replacement for Lorne Jenkins. He scored twice on his debut against Tamil Eelam, in a 6–0 victory that guaranteed the team's passage to the quarter finals.

== Personal life ==
Nouble was born in Deptford, London Borough of Lewisham to Ivorian parents.

He is the younger brother of former England youth international footballer, Frank Nouble.

== Career statistics ==
As of match played 25 November 2023

Appearances and goals by club, season and competition
Club	Season	League			National Cup		League Cup		Other		Total	
Club	Season	Division	Apps	Goals	Apps	Goals	Apps	Goals	Apps	Goals	Apps	Goals
Dagenham & Redbridge	2013–14	League Two	1	0	—		0	0	0	0	1	0
Thurrock (loan)	2013–14	Isthmian League Division One North	8	2	3	1	—		0	0	11	3
Grays Athletic (loan)	2013–14	Isthmian League Premier Division	28	7	—		—		4 (Note: Appearances in Isthmian League Cup)	2	32	9
Welling United (loan)	2014–15	Conference Premier	12	0	1	0	—		—		13	0
St Albans City (loan)	2014–15	Conference South	5	1	—		—		2 (Note: Appearances in FA Trophy)	0	7	1
Thurrock (loan)	2014–15	Isthmian League Division One North	3	1	—		—		—		3	1
Grays Athletic (loan)	2014–15	Isthmian League Premier Division	8	0	—		—		3	1	11	1
Bishop's Stortford	2016–17	National League South	4	0	—		—		2 (Note: One appearance in FA Trophy, one appearance in Herts Senior Cup)	0	6	0
Grays Athletic	2016–17	Isthmian League Premier Division	5	0	—		—		—		5	0
Thurrock	2017–18	Isthmian League Premier Division	37	4	2	0	—		2	0	41	4
Haringey Borough	2018–19	Isthmian League Premier Division	39	16	6	2	—		2 (Note: One appearance in FA Trophy, one appearance in Isthmian League play-offs)	0	47	18
Concord Rangers	2019–20	National League South	26	8	—		—		8 (Note: Seven appearances and two goals in FA Trophy, one appearance in Essex Senior Cup)	2	34	10
Aldershot Town	2020–21	National League	31	5	1	0	—		3	0	35	5
Livingston	2021–22	Scottish Premiership	16	0	2	0	0	0	0	0	18	0
Livingston	2022–23	Scottish Premiership	30	7	1	0	5	0	0	0	36	7
Livingston	2023–24	Scottish Premiership	32	1	0	0	6	2	0	0	20	2
Livingston	Total		78	8	3	0	11	2	0	0	74	9
Arbroath (loan)	2021–22	Scottish Championship	20	4	0	0	3	1	0	0	23	5
Career total			287	50	16	3	14	3	26	5	343	61
