= Fabrice Guzel =

French footballer (born 1990)

Personal information
- Date of birth: 9 November 1990 (age 36)
- Position: Defender

Team information
- Current team: FC Plan-les-Ouates

Senior career*
Years	Team	Apps	(Gls)
–2013	UGA Lyon-Décines		
2013–2015	Louhans-Cuiseaux FC	30	(1)
2015	Luçon FC	2	(0)
2016	GOAL FC	2	(0)
2016	AS Marck	6	(1)
2017	UGA Ardziv		
2017–2018	US Pontet Grand Avignon 84	23	(2)
2018–2019	FC Stade Nyonnais	23	(3)
2019–2020	UGA Ardziv	8	(0)
2020–2021	FC Echallens	12	(1)
2021–2022	CS Chênois	9	(0)
2022–	FC Plan-les-Ouates		

International career
- Western Armenia
- * Club domestic league appearances and goals

Fabrice Guzel (born 9 November 1990) is a footballer who plays as a defender for FC Plan-les-Ouates.

== Early life ==
Guzel is a native of Lyon, France. He is of Armenian descent. He started playing football at the age of five.

== Club career ==
Guzel started his career with French side UGA Lyon-Décines, where he debuted under the presidency of France international Youri Djorkaeff. In 2013, he signed for French side Louhans-Cuiseaux FC, where he captained the club. He was regarded as one of the club's most important players. He later suffered an injury while playing for them. In 2015, he signed for French side Luçon FC. In 2016, he signed for French side AS Marck, but left due to conflict with the management. In 2017, he signed for French side UGA Ardziv. After that, he signed for French side US Pontet Grand Avignon 84, where he was regarded as one of the club's most important defenders. In 2018, he signed for Swiss side FC Stade Nyonnais, where he was regarded as a fan favorite. In total, he made twenty-three league appearances and scored three goals for FC Stade Nyonnais. In 2020, he signed for Swiss side FC Echallens.

== International career ==
Guzel played for the Western Armenia national football team and was one of the team's professional players. he played for the team at the 2016 CONIFA World Football Cup, 2018 CONIFA World Football Cup, and 2019 CONIFA European Football Cup.

== Style of play ==
Guzel mainly operates as a central defender and as a central midfielder. He is two-footed.

== Personal life ==
Guzel was born in France to Armenian parents.
