= Mohamed Bettamer =

English-born Libyan footballer (born 1993)

Personal information
- Full name: Mohamed Abdelkadir Bettamer
- Date of birth: 1 April 1993 (age 33)
- Place of birth: Camden, England
- Height: 1.85 m (6 ft 1 in)
- Position: Forward

Team information
- Current team: Al-Shomooa

Youth career
- Arsenal
- Queens Park Rangers
- Fulham
- Kingsbury London Tigers

Senior career*
Years	Team	Apps	(Gls)
2010	Kingsbury London Tigers		
2010–2011	Watford	0	(0)
2011	London Tigers		
2011–2012	Hayes & Yeading United	7	(0)
2012	→ Bedfont Town (loan)	1	(0)
2012	North Greenford United	2	(0)
2012	London Tigers		
2012–2013	Hampton & Richmond Borough		
2013–2016	Al-Ahly Benghazi		
2016–2018	Staines Town	82	(39)
2018	Braintree Town	15	(6)
2018–2019	Barnet	3	(0)
2019	→ Welling United (loan)	6	(2)
2019	→ Hemel Hempstead Town (loan)	4	(0)
2019–2022	Aldershot Town	75	(14)
2022	→ Maidstone United (loan)	5	(0)
2022–2024	Hayes & Yeading United	25	(6)
2022–2023	→ Concord Rangers (loan)	26	(7)
2023–2024	→ Chelmsford City (loan)	15	(3)
2024–2025	Asswehly	2	(0)
2025	Al Tahaddy	9	(0)
2025–2026	Hanwell Town	16	(3)
2026–	Al-Shomooa	3	(0)

International career^{‡}
- Libya U18
- Libya U20
- Libya U23
2018	Barawa	4	(2)
2020–	Libya	4	(1)
- * Club domestic league appearances and goals as of 09:25, 6 September 2026 (UTC) ‡ National team caps and goals as of 10:50, 11 September 2024 (UTC)

Mohamed Abdelkadir Bettamer (Arabic: محمد عبد القادر بالتمر; born 1 April 1993) is a professional footballer who plays as a forward for Libyan Premier League club Al-Shomooa.

Born in England, he represents Libya at international level.

== Early and personal life ==
Bettamer was born in Camden, to a Libyan father and a Moroccan mother. Bettamer still has family members living in the Bohdema area of Benghazi.

== Club career ==
Bettamer began his career with Arsenal, before moving to Queens Park Rangers at under-11 level. Bettamer later joined Fulham at under-14 level.

Bettamer began his senior career Kingsbury London Tigers, where he made played in the youth team. In 2010 he joined Watford on a one-year scholarship but was not offered a professional contract. He then returned to London Tigers before joining Hayes & Yeading United, making his debut in November 2011. Bettamer was unable to hold down a first team spot with the Conference Premier side and joined Bedfont Town on loan before being released in March 2012. He then spent the remainder of the season with North Greenford United. He played with Hampton & Richmond Borough in 2012–13, before trials at Dagenham & Redbridge, and Maidenhead United. He then joined Al-Ahly (Benghazi) in Libya on a three-year contract, with whom he reached the quarter-finals of the CAF Champions League. Due to the civil war in Libya, leading to the suspension of the domestic league in the country, he was unable to play during the final two years of his contract. After it expired, he then joined Staines Town, with whom he scored 42 goals in 89 games. He signed a pre-contract agreement with Stevenage in the summer of 2018, but with no contract on the table he joined Braintree Town on a non-contract basis, before a move to Salford City fell through.

=== Barnet ===
Bettamer signed for Barnet on 9 November 2018. Two days later Bettamer made his debut on 11 November 2018 in the FA Cup against League One club Bristol Rovers which finished 1–1 and required a replay. His National League debut for Barnet came in the away game against Hartlepool United helping the team to a 3–1 win. Subsequently Bettamer was then loaned out to Welling United and Hemel Hempstead Town.

=== Aldershot Town ===
He signed for Aldershot Town on a free transfer from Barnet in October 2019. He joined Maidstone United on a one month loan in January 2022. On 26 February 2022, the loan was extended for a further month. Bettamer was released by the club at the end of the 2021–22 season.

=== Hayes & Yeading return ===
In July 2022, Bettamer returned to Hayes & Yeading United. In November 2022, he joined Concord Rangers on loan, a deal that was later extended until the end of the season. On 2 June 2023, Bettamer joined Chelmsford City on loan. On 31 January 2024, after five goals in 21 appearances in all competitions for Chelmsford, Bettamer was recalled by Hayes & Yeading.

=== Return to Libya ===
In August 2024, Bettamer returned to Libya to join Asswehly. In February 2025 he joined Al Tahaddy.

=== Return to England ===
Bettamer signed for Hanwell Town for the 2025–26 season. On 15 February 2026, Hanwell announced Bettamer had left the club in order to return to Libya.

== International career ==
He has represented Libya at under-18, under-20 and under-23 youth levels. He was called-up by the senior team in November 2020. He debuted for the senior Libya national team in a 3–2 2021 Africa Cup of Nations qualification loss to Equatorial Guinea on 11 November 2020, scoring his team's second goal in his debut.

At the 2018 CONIFA World Football Cup, he represented the Barawa football team, scoring twice in five games. As he was added to the team after the tournament started, and as he was not of Somali descent, his inclusion caused a controversy which resulted in the Ellan Vannin football team, who had protested, to be disqualified from the tournament.

== Playing style ==
Primarily a centre forward, Bettamer can also play as a left winger.

== Career statistics ==
=== Club ===
As of end of 2022-23 season

Appearances and goals by club, season and competition
Club	Season	League			National cup (Note: Includes FA Cup)		League cup (Note: Includes EFL Cup)		Other		Total	
Club	Season	Division	Apps	Goals	Apps	Goals	Apps	Goals	Apps	Goals	Apps	Goals
Kingsbury London Tigers	2010–11	SSML Premier Division	No data currently available									
London Tigers	2011–12	SSML Premier Division	No data currently available									
Hayes & Yeading United	2011–12	Conference Premier	7	0	—		—		1 (Note: Appearance(s) in FA Trophy)	0	8	0
Bedfont Town (loan)	2011–12	SFL Division One Central	1	0	—		—		—		1	0
North Greenford United	2011–12	SFL Division One Central	2	0	—		—		—		2	0
London Tigers	2012–13	SSML Premier Division	No data currently available									
Hampton & Richmond Borough	2012–13	Isthmian League Premier Division	No data currently available									
Al-Ahly Benghazi	2013–14	Libyan Premier League	No data currently available						8 (Note: Appearances in CAF Champions League)	0		
Staines Town	2016–17	Isthmian League Premier Division	40	12	3	2	—		1	1	44	15
Staines Town	2017–18	Isthmian League Premier Division	42	27	1	0	—		2 (Note: One appearance in FA Trophy, one appearance in Alan Turvey Trophy)	0	45	27
Staines Town	Total		82	39	4	2	—		3	1	89	42
Braintree Town	2018–19	National League	15	6	0	0	—		0	0	15	6
Barnet	2018–19	National League	3	0	2	0	—		3 (Note: One appearance in FA Trophy, two appearances in Middlesex Senior Cup)	0	8	0
Barnet	2019–20	National League	0	0	0	0	—		0	0	0	0
Barnet	Total		3	0	2	0	0	0	3	0	8	0
Welling United (loan)	2018–19	National League South	6	2	0	0	—		3 (Note: Two appearances in National League South playoffs, one appearance and one goal in London Senior Cup)	1	9	3
Hemel Hempstead Town (loan)	2019–20	National League South	4	0	0	0	—		0	0	4	0
Aldershot Town	2019–20	National League	19	5	1	1	—		2 (Note: One appearance in FA Trophy, one appearance and two goals in Hampshire Senior Cup)	3	22	9
Aldershot Town	2020–21	National League	40	8	1	1	—		3	3	44	12
Aldershot Town	2021–22	National League	16	1	1	0	—		0	0	17	1
Aldershot Town	Total		75	14	3	2	—		5	6	83	22
Maidstone United (loan)	2021–22	National League South	5	0	0	0	—		0	0	5	0
Hayes & Yeading United	2022–23	SFL Premier Division South	11	2	3	0	—		2	0	17	2
Concord Rangers (loan)	2022–23	National League South	26	7	0	0	—		0	0	26	7
Career total			237	70	12	4	0	0	25	8	275	82

=== International ===
As of match played 10 September 2024

Appearances and goals by national team and year
National team	Year	Apps	Goals
Libya	2020	2	1
Libya	2024	2	0
Total		4	1

Scores and results list Libya's goal tally first.

No.	Date	Venue	Opponent	Score	Result	Competition
1.	11 November 2020	Al Salam Stadium, Cairo, Egypt	Equatorial Guinea	2–1	2–3	2021 Africa Cup of Nations qualification
