= Hayes Lane =

Football stadium in London

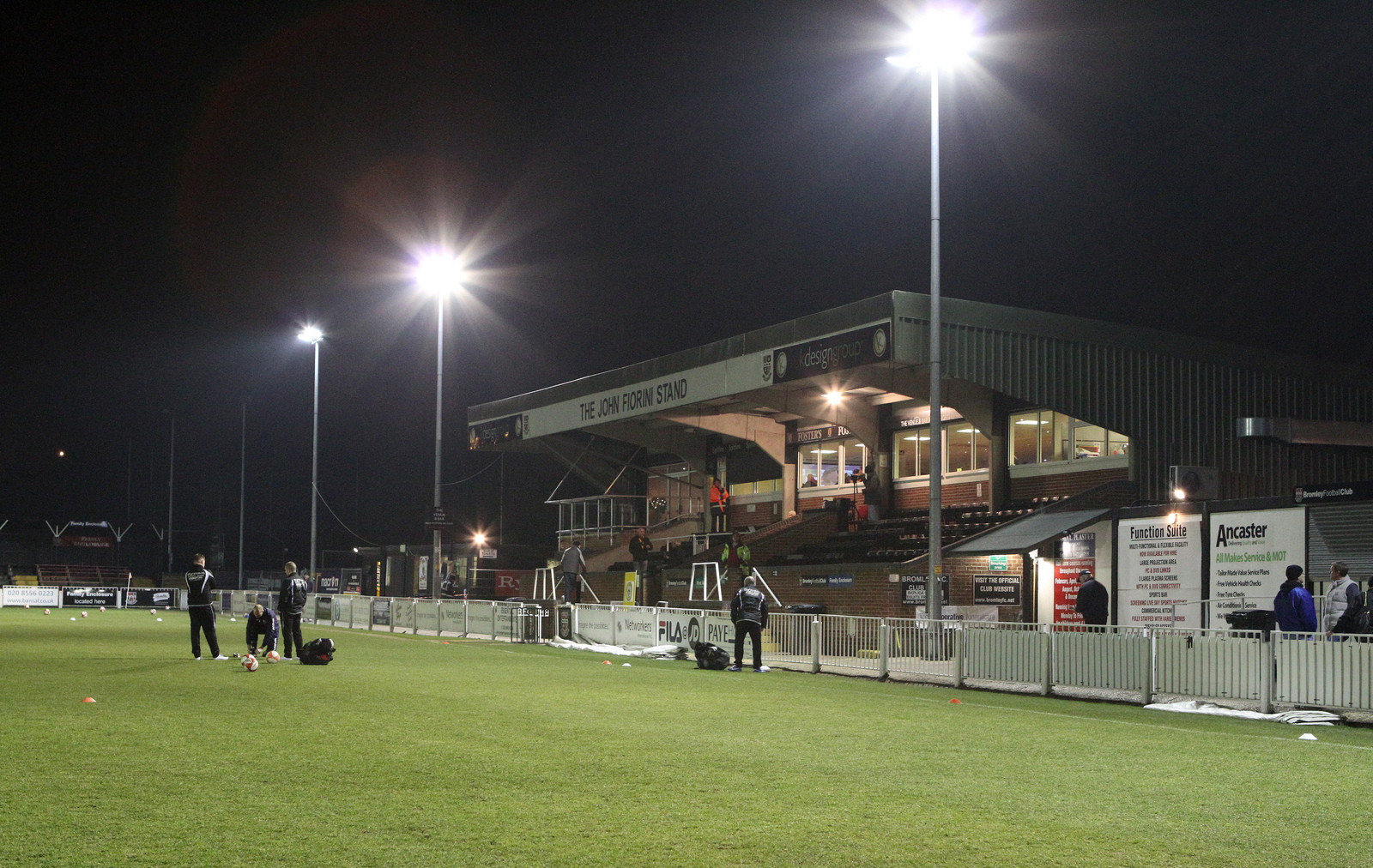
- Interactive map of Hayes Lane
- Location: Bromley, Greater London, England, BR2 9EF
- Coordinates: 51°23′24″N 0°01′16″E
- Owner: Bromley F.C.
- Surface: Grass
- Record attendance: 10,798
- Public transit: Bromley South

Construction
- Opened: 1938
- Renovated: 2019, 2025
- Cost: +2.8 million

Tenants
- Bromley F.C. (1938–present); Cray Wanderers F.C. (1998–2024); Crystal Palace Women (2014–2023); London City Lionesses (2024–present)

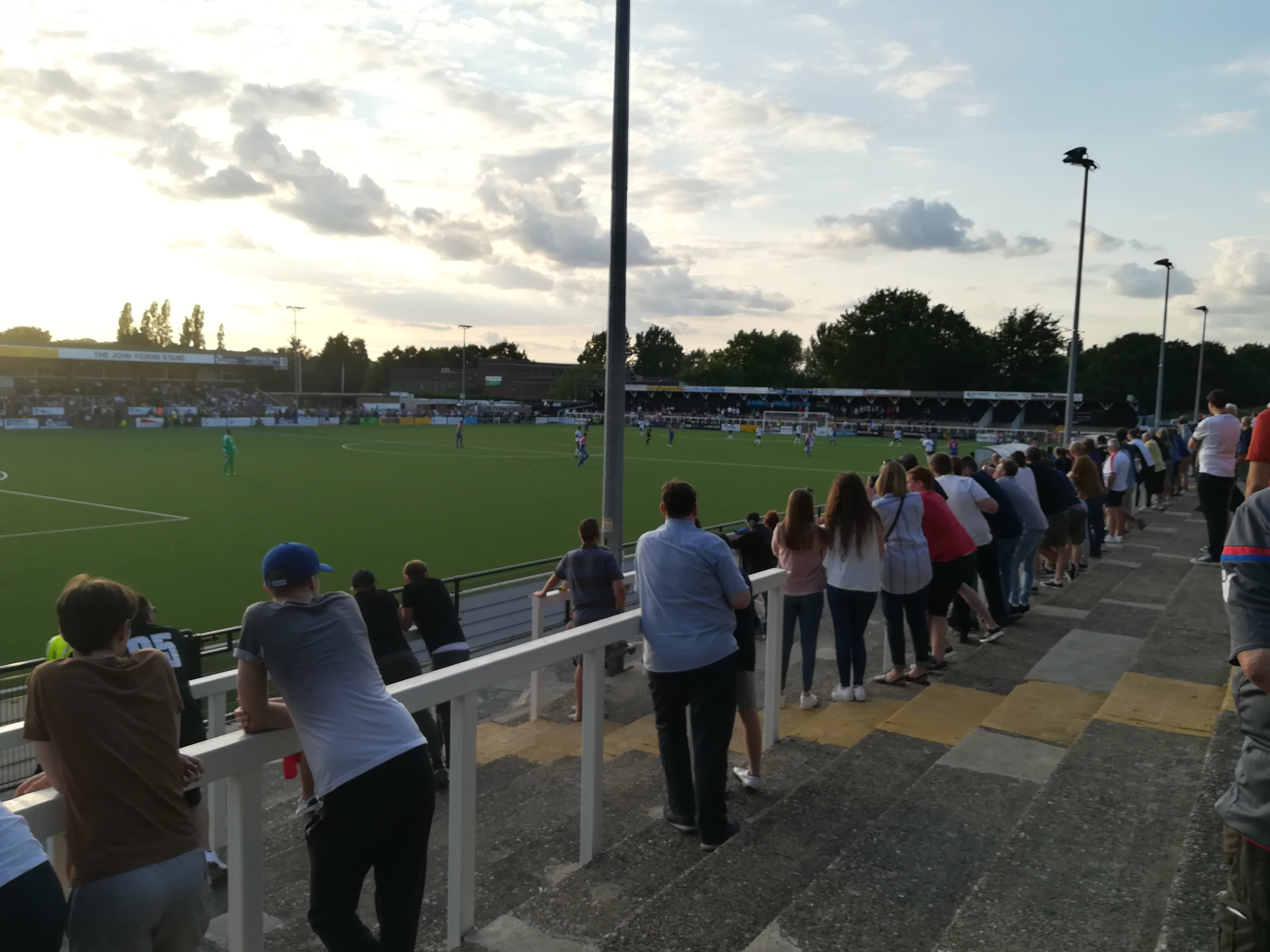
Hayes Lane in 2018 viewed from the "Old East Terrace"

Hayes Lane, currently known as the Copperjax Community Stadium for sponsorship reasons, is a football stadium in Bromley, Greater London, England. Located between Bromley town centre and Hayes, it is the home of London City Lionesses and Bromley Football Club.

== History ==
Bromley F.C. moved to Hayes Lane in 1938 from their previous ground, also on the same road. It initially featured a 2,500-seat stand on one side of the pitch, with the remainder of the pitch surrounded by banking. The ground was opened by Stanley Rous on 3 September 1938, with Walthamstow Avenue winning 6–1. The record attendance at the ground of 10,798 was set on 24 September 1948 for a friendly game between Bromley and a Nigeria XI. Floodlights were installed in 1960, and were formally switched on for a game between Japan and an Isthmian League XI on 27 September.

The banking was later replaced by concrete terracing, with both ends of the pitch later covered. The original stand burned down in October 1992, and was replaced by a much smaller 320-seat stand, which was opened the following year. Seats obtained from the London Aquatics Centre were installed behind one goal to meet ground grading regulations after promotion to the National League.

In April 2017 the club announced that work would begin on construction of a 1,485-seat stand at the south end of the ground, and that the playing surface would be converted from grass to 3G. The stand was officially opened on 20 July 2019 and named in honour of former club chairman Glyn Beverly.

In 2020 Bromley made improvements to the Main Stand (John Fiorini Stand). The works included the addition of a second storey and an extension to the existing ground-floor facilities, providing a new main entrance, club shop and additional office space. The works improved the facilities within the stand and increased the number of seats in the stand by 128 up to 411. Although this did not increase the overall capacity of Hayes Lane, instead it replaced some of the existing standing capacity.

Following promotion to League Two in 2024, Bromley were required to make improvements to Hayes Lane in order to comply with EFL regulations. During the summer of 2024, the artificial playing surface was removed and replaced with a natural grass pitch. A new covered seated stand was also installed on the eastern side of the North Terrace to provide additional covered accommodation, this section makes up part of the away allocation.

In November 2024 the club confirmed they were ready to proceed with plans to demolish the existing East terrace and replace it with a steeper, roofed stand featuring a new concourse and space for up to 2,230 supporters. The redevelopment was driven by the club's recent promotion and the requirement to meet EFL ground regulations. During the redevelopment period, away supporters were temporarily relocated to a section of the Glyn Beverley Stand.

The new East Terrace was completed in October 2025, replacing the former uncovered terrace with a covered structure featuring improved spectator facilities and accommodation for up to 2,230 supporters and increasing the stadium capacity back to 5,160. Following completion, away supporters returned to the north-eastern side of Hayes Lane, with their allocation split between the covered seating area within the North Terrace and a section of the East Terrace. The first match played with the completed stand was a 3–3 draw against Tranmere Rovers, during which the terrace operated at 50% capacity.

== Other users ==
Hayes Lane has also been used as a home venue by several other clubs. Crystal Palace Women played their home matches at the stadium between 2014 and 2023. Cray Wanderers were tenants at Hayes Lane from 1998 until 2024, before moving to their new home at Flamingo Park. London City Lionesses relocated to Hayes Lane in 2024, and continue to play their home fixtures at the stadium.

== Layout ==
=== Main Stand ===
The Main Stand, officially known as the John Fiorini Stand, is a covered, all-seater stand. Opened in 1993, it houses the directors’ box and the club's media facilities.

In 2019 small changes were made to the stand to allow for a second floor to be built and an extension to the existing ground floor allowing for a new main entrance, club shop and office. Extra seats were also added.

In 2020 the club submitted plans for a significant redevelopment of this stand, including upgraded seating, new offices, a reception area, a club shop, and an extended roof to cover all seats. However, as of November 2025, these plans had not materialised, with redevelopment efforts instead shifted towards the East Stand.

==== West Terrace ====
Located on the same side as the Main Stand, the West Terrace is a small, open terrace consisting of six steps. It provides standing accommodation for around 250 spectators. Behind the terrace is a dedicated food and drink seating area.

=== North Terrace ===
Although the exact date of construction in its current form is uncertain, the North Terrace is estimated to date back to around 1960. It is considered the home of Bromley's most vocal supporters. The terrace is 16 steps high, with a small roof covering the back four rows. Nowadays the terrace runs roughly two thirds of the length of the pitch.

In 2025 a new covered 240-seat stand was installed on the east side of the North Terrace. This structure now forms part of the away end, in conjunction with the new East Stand.

=== East Stand ===
Completely rebuilt in 2025 at a cost of £2.8 million to replace the old concrete east terrace, the new East Stand was completed in October 2025.

The stand features a modern concourse offering food, drink, and toilet facilities. The north side of the East Stand is designated for away supporters, forming the new primary away section alongside the seated area by the North Terrace. According to the planning application, 264 seats are supposed to be in this area, however as of July 2026, there are no seats in this area and there is terracing instead.

=== Glyn Beverley Stand ===
Redeveloped in 2019, the Glyn Beverley Stand replaced the former South Stand, which previously consisted of mixed seating and standing areas. The new all-seater stand accommodates 1,485 spectators and includes a large bar and function area situated behind the seating. Part of the stand is reserved as the designated family area and spaces for wheelchair users.

The club submitted a planning application in 2025 to add a second tier to the Glyn Beverley stand. It would add 390 seats to the stand.

== International football ==
In 2018 Hayes Lane hosted five games at the 2018 CONIFA World Football Cup as follows:

| Year | Date | Team 1 | Result | Team 2 | Competition |
|---|---|---|---|---|---|
| 2018 | 31 May | Barawa | 4–0 | Tamil Eelam | 2018 ConIFA World Football Cup Group A |
| 2018 | 5 June | (Turkey) London Turkish Select | 4–0 | Tibet | 2018 ConIFA World Football Cup placement round 1 |
| 2018 | 5 June | Western Armenia | 0–4 | Székely Land | 2018 ConIFA World Football Cup quarter-final |
| 2018 | 7 June | Abkhazia | 2–0 | United Koreans in Japan | 2018 ConIFA World Football Cup placement round 2 |
| 2018 | 7 June | Cascadia | 4–0 | Western Armenia | 2018 ConIFA World Football Cup placement round 2 |
