= Kamaljit Singh (footballer, born 1994) =

German footballer (born 1994)

Personal information
- Date of birth: 3 September 1994 (age 32)
- Place of birth: Germany
- Position: Striker

Team information
- Current team: Eintracht Nordhorn

International career
Years	Team	Apps	(Gls)
	Panjab		(6+)

Kamaljit Singh (born 3 September 1994) is a German footballer who plays as a striker for Eintracht Nordhorn.

== Club career ==
Singh started his career with German sixth tier side Eintracht Nordhorn. In 2014, he signed for Union Lohne in the German seventh tier. In 2017, Singh signed for German fourth tier club Rehden. Before the second half of 2017–18, he signed for SpVgg Vreden in the German sixth tier.

In 2018, he returned to German seventh tier team Eintracht Nordhorn. Singh was the top scorer of the 2021–22 German seventh tier with 55 goals.

== International career ==
Singh was the top scorer of the 2018 CONIFA World Football Cup with 6 goals.
