= Calum Ferguson =

Scottish football player (born 1995)

Personal information
- Date of birth: 12 February 1995 (age 31)
- Place of birth: Inverness, Scotland
- Position: Forward

Youth career
- Ross County
- Inverness Caledonian Thistle

Senior career*
Years	Team	Apps	(Gls)
2013–2016	Inverness Caledonian Thistle	2	(0)
2014	→ Montrose (loan)	4	(0)
2016–2017	Albion Rovers	21	(1)
2017–2018	Elgin City	10	(0)
2019	Valour FC	8	(1)
2019–2020	Canterbury United	11	(2)
2021	Erie Commodores		
2022	Warrenpoint Town	0	(0)
2022–2023	Mousehole		
2023	Brechin City		
2023–2024	Clachnacuddin		

International career
2013	Canada U18	5	(1)
2014–2015	Canada U20	6	(1)
2018	Cascadia	6	(5)
- * Club domestic league appearances and goals

Calum Ferguson (born 12 February 1995) is a Scottish football administrator and former player who played as a forward. Born in Scotland, he has represented Canada at youth international level.

== Club career ==
=== Inverness Caledonian Thistle ===
After progressing through the youth ranks at Inverness, Ferguson made the game-day squad for the first time with the Caley Jags against his former club Ross County on 19 May 2013. Ferguson was loaned to Montrose in early 2014. He played four games before his loan ended. He would again make the game-day squad with Inverness against Partick Thistle on 7 February 2015 in the Scottish Cup. Ferguson finally made his debut for Inverness against Kilmarnock on 21 February as a substitute in a 3–3 draw.

=== Albion Rovers ===
After leaving Inverness at the end of the 2015–16 season, Ferguson signed for Scottish League One side Albion Rovers in July 2016, after impressing as a trialist in a pre-season friendly against Motherwell. Ferguson hit the headlines with Albion Rovers when he scored a dramatic last minute winner in the Scottish Cup against Queen of the South to send his side through to play Celtic.

=== Elgin City ===
In summer 2017, Ferguson signed with Scottish League Two side Elgin City.

=== Valour FC ===
On 3 April 2019, Ferguson signed with Canadian Premier League side Valour FC after a trial. He had previously spent time on trial with HFX Wanderers FC. He made his debut for Valour on 8 May against Cavalry FC. On 11 May, Ferguson scored his first goal for Valour in a 1–0 win over HFX Wanderers. On 7 October 2019, Ferguson was granted an early leave from the club to pursue opportunities in New Zealand.

=== Canterbury United ===
On 1 November 2019, Ferguson signed with New Zealand Football Championship side Canterbury United FC. He made his debut on 2 November as a starter in a 1–0 loss to Eastern Suburbs.

=== Warrenpoint Town ===
After spending 2021 with NPSL side Erie Commodores, Ferguson signed with NIFL Premiership side Warrenpoint Town until the end of the season on 13 February 2022.

== International career ==
Ferguson's mother was born in Canada, and as a result he has eligibility for both Canada and Scotland. He made his debut for Canada at the under-18 level at the 2013 Torneo COTIF, where he scored a goal against Belarus. In 2014, he progressed to the under-20 team and participated at the 2014 Milk Cup and the 2015 CONCACAF U-20 Championship.

Ferguson was called up by Cascadia for the 2018 ConIFA World Football Cup. He finished the tournament with 5 goals in 6 games as Cascadia finished 6th overall.

== Later career ==
As of November 2026 he was working as a development officer with Alba Football Alliance.

== Personal life ==
Ferguson is a fluent speaker of Scottish Gaelic and appeared regularly on BBC Radio nan Gàidheal and BBC Alba.

== Career statistics ==
As of match played 24 January 2020

Appearances and goals by club, season and competition
Club	Season	League			National Cup		League Cup		Other		Total	
Club	Season	Division	Apps	Goals	Apps	Goals	Apps	Goals	Apps	Goals	Apps	Goals
Inverness Caledonian Thistle	2013–14	Scottish Premiership	0	0	0	0	0	0	–		0	0
Inverness Caledonian Thistle	2014–15	Scottish Premiership	2	0	0	0	0	0	–		2	0
Inverness Caledonian Thistle	2015–16	Scottish Premiership	0	0	0	0	0	0	–		0	0
Inverness Caledonian Thistle	Total		2	0	0	0	0	0	–		0	0
Montrose (loan)	2014–15	Scottish League Two	4	0	0	0	0	0	0	0	4	0
Albion Rovers	2016–17	Scottish League One	21	1	2	1	4	0	1 (Note: Appearances in the Scottish Challenge Cup)	0	28	2
Elgin City	2017–18	Scottish League Two	4	0	1	0	1	0	2	0	8	0
Valour FC	2019	Canadian Premier League	8	1	1	0	–		0	0	9	1
Canterbury United	2019–20	New Zealand Premiership	11	2	0	0	–		0	0	11	2
Career total			50	4	4	1	5	0	3	0	62	5

== See also ==
- List of Scottish Gaelic-speaking people
