= Kabylia football team =

Football team representing the kabylia region

Kabylia
- Nickname(s): Izmawen n idurar (The Mountain Lions)
- Confederation: ConIFA
- Head coach: Aksel Bellabbaci
- Most caps: 10 players (2)
- Top scorer: Nadjim Bouabbas (2)
colours	colours

First international
- Panjab 8–0 Kabylie (Slough, United Kingdom; 31 May 2018)

Biggest win
- Tibet 1–8 Kabylia (Enfield, United Kingdom; 7 June 2018)

Biggest defeat
- Panjab 8–0 Kabylia (Slough, United Kingdom; 31 May 2018)

ConIFA World Football Cup
- Appearances: 1 (first in 2018)
- Best result: Tenth place (2018)

The Kabylia football team (Kabyle: Tarvaɛt taɣelnawt taqvaylit n ddavex uḍar) is the team representing the Kabyle people, who live in Kabylia. They are not affiliated with FIFA or CAF, and therefore cannot compete for the FIFA World Cup or the Africa Cup of Nations.

Kabylia have played in the 2018 ConIFA World Football Cup qualification.

== Current squad ==
The following players were called up for the 2018 ConIFA World Football Cup.

No.	Pos.	Player	Date of birth (age)	Caps	Goals	Club
1	GK	Murad Koulougli	10 September 1987 (aged 30)	0	0	(French Football Federation) JS Imazighen
24	GK	Rahim Belaid	31 May 1990 (aged 28)	0	0	(Canadian Soccer Association) CS Mont-Royal Outremont
4	DF	Idir Belasla	20 November 1999 (aged 18)	2	0	(French Football Federation) ASSM Savigneux
8	DF	Khelifa Drider	25 June 1993 (aged 24)	2	0	(French Football Federation) Petit Bard Montpellier
9	DF	Elhadi Boukir	9 September 1987 (aged 30)	2	0	(Royal Spanish Football Federation) CD Barrio Obrero
10	DF	Ahmed Simoud	16 December 1993 (aged 24)	1	0	(French Football Federation) Université Lille 1
14	DF	Yacine Irnatene	1 January 1987 (aged 31)	0	0	(The Football Association) Dagenham & Redbridge
18	DF	Idir Bouali	13 December 1987 (aged 30)	0	0	(Algerian Football Federation) UM Bejaia
19	DF	Lyes Mihoubi	4 October 1995 (aged 22)	0	0	(Algerian Football Federation) ORB Akbou
7	MF	Ilyas Hadid	1 January 2000 (aged 18)	2	1	(French Football Federation) US Créteil II
6	MF	Yanis Kemache	7 June 1995 (aged 22)	2	0	(French Football Federation) USM Malakoff
11	MF	Amara Hamadache	2 April 1991 (aged 27)	2	0	(French Football Federation) Villeneuve St. Georges
12	MF	Idir Lamhene	29 December 1997 (aged 20)	0	0	(Algerian Football Federation) US Sidi Belloua
13	MF	Hocine Mohammedi	3 May 1988 (aged 30)	0	0	(The Football Association) AC Finchley
17	MF	Walid Daira	10 May 1998 (aged 20)	0	0	(Algerian Football Federation) ES Tigzirt
20	MF	Malik Amerkane	13 February 1988 (aged 30)	0	0	(Algerian Football Federation) ES Azzefoun
22	FW	Nadjim Bouabbas	1 March 1999 (aged 19)	2	2	(French Football Federation) US Rungis
3	FW	Enzo Mezaib	5 January 1998 (aged 20)	2	0	(French Football Federation) Conflans
16	FW	Bachir Ghuersa	1 October 2000 (aged 17)	2	0	(French Football Federation) Villeneuve St. Georges
2	FW	Abderrezak Chennit	15 January 1998 (aged 20)	0	0	(Algerian Football Federation) JS Akbou
5	FW	Karim Ouarab	21 July 1999 (aged 18)	0	0	(Algerian Football Federation) JS Kabylie
21	FW	Nafa Belmellat	26 January 1987 (aged 31)	0	0	(The Football Association) AC Finchley

== Notable players ==
- (Kabylie) Nadjim Bouabbas - national team top scorer
