= Kamaljit Singh Paul =

Indian neurosurgeon

- Born: India
- Occupation: Neurosurgeon
- Awards: Padma Shri; Punjab Gaurav Sanman; Patients' Choice Award

Kamaljit Singh Paul is a US-based Indian neurosurgeon known for his expertise in the treatment of epilepsy, tremors and Parkinson's disease. He holds 19 US patents including 12 patents for surgical devices. A recipient of the Punjab Gaurav Sanman in 2001 from the Government of Punjab and twice winner of the Patients' Choice Award in 2008 ad 2009, Paul was honored by the Government of India, in 2002, with the fourth highest Indian civilian award of Padma Shri.
