= Kamaljit Singh Garewal =

Indian Judge

Justice Kamajit Singh Garewal is an Indian Judge. He was a sitting United Nations Appeals Tribunal and Punjab and Haryana High Court judge.

== Biography ==
He did his schooling from Mayo College, Ajmer and later graduated from St. Stephen's College, Delhi. He was appointed as a judge at Punjab and Haryana High Court on 23 May 2000.

He was elected by the UN General Assembly as Judge of the United Nations Appeals Tribunal (UNAT) on 2 March 2009 obtaining 154 votes out of 172 cast which is the highest number for any candidate. Justice Garewal had served in the UNAT for a three-year term, starting from 1 July 2009.
