= Ronald Takács =

Hungarian footballer (born 1998)

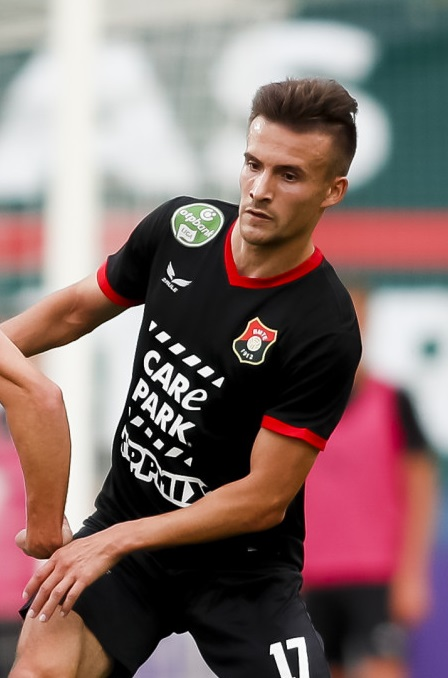
- Takács playing for Budafok in 2020

Personal information
- Date of birth: 26 January 1998 (age 28)
- Place of birth: Vyshkovo, Ukraine
- Height: 1.80 m (5 ft 11 in)
- Position: Midfielder

Team information
- Current team: St. Egyden / Stfd.

Youth career
- 2009–2013: Puskás Akadémia
- 2013–2014: Debrecen
- 2014–2016: MTK Budapest

Senior career*
Years	Team	Apps	(Gls)
2016–2018	MTK Budapest	14	(1)
2019–2020	Inter Bratislava	9	(0)
2020–2023	Budafok	38	(4)
2023–2024	Gyirmót	18	(1)
2025–2026	Rohrbach	3	(0)
2026–	St. Egyden / Stfd.	0	(0)

International career
2016	Hungary U-18	1	(0)
2016–2017	Hungary U-19	6	(0)
- * Club domestic league appearances and goals as of 16 February 2026

Ronald Takács (born 26 January 1998) is a Hungarian professional footballer who plays as a midfielder for St. Egyden / Stfd.

== Career statistics ==
Appearances and goals by club, season and competition
Club	Season	League			Cup		Europe		Total	
Club	Season	Division	Apps	Goals	Apps	Goals	Apps	Goals	Apps	Goals
MTK Budapest
MTK Budapest	2016–17	Nemzeti Bajnokság I	4	0	2	1	—		6	1
MTK Budapest	2017–18	Nemzeti Bajnokság II	9	1	2	0	—		11	1
MTK Budapest	2018–19	Nemzeti Bajnokság I	1	0	1	0	—		2	0
MTK Budapest	Total		14	1	5	1	0	0	19	2
Inter Bratislava	2019–20	3. Liga (Slovakia)	9	0	0	0	—		9	0
Budafok	2020–21	Nemzeti Bajnokság I	21	2	1	0	—		22	2
Career total			44	3	6	1	0	0	50	4

Updated to games played as of 15 May 2021.
