= Zsolt Gajdos =

Hungarian footballer (born 1993)

Personal information
- Full name: Zsolt Gajdos
- Date of birth: 4 February 1993 (age 33)
- Place of birth: Velyka Byihan, Ukraine
- Height: 1.83 m (6 ft 0 in)
- Position: Midfielder

Team information
- Current team: Gyirmót

Youth career
- 2009–2012: Videoton

Senior career*
Years	Team	Apps	(Gls)
2012–2015	Puskás	26	(3)
2014	→ Békéscsaba (loan)	11	(3)
2014–2015	→ Csákvár (loan)	26	(14)
2015–2016	Szolnoki MÁV	29	(15)
2016	Puskás	16	(0)
2017	Haladás	2	(0)
2017–2018	Nyíregyháza Spartacus	25	(4)
2018–2019	Zalaegerszegi TE	26	(9)
2019–2024	Szeged-Csanád	160	(33)
2025–	Gyirmót	12	(1)
- * Club domestic league appearances and goals as of 10 June 2025

Zsolt Gajdos (born 4 February 1993) is a Hungarian professional footballer who plays as a midfielder for Gyirmót. He played in the 2018 CONIFA World Cup for Kárpátalja.

== Career statistics ==
Appearances and goals by club, season and competition
Club	Season	League			Cup		League Cup		Europe		Total	
Club	Season	Division	Apps	Goals	Apps	Goals	Apps	Goals	Apps	Goals	Apps	Goals
Videoton	2011–12	Nemzeti Bajnokság I	0	0	1	0	0	0	0	0	1	0
Puskás
Puskás	2012–13	Nemzeti Bajnokság II	26	3	0	0	0	0	0	0	26	3
Puskás	2013–14	Nemzeti Bajnokság I	3	0	0	0	2	0	0	0	5	0
Puskás	Total		29	3	0	0	2	0	0	0	31	3
Békéscsaba	2013–14	Nemzeti Bajnokság II	11	3	0	0	0	0	0	0	11	3
Career total			40	6	1	0	2	0	0	0	43	6

Updated to games played as of 1 June 2014.
