= 2020 in Abkhazian football =

Football in Abkhazia
- Season: 2020

Men's football
- Premier League: Nart Sukhum
- Abkhazian Cup: Gagra
- Super Cup: Nart Sukhum

The 2020 season is the 22nd season of competitive association football in Abkhazia.

== National teams ==
=== Abkhazia national football team ===
==== Results and fixtures ====
===== Friendlies =====
| 25 September 2020 | Abkhazia | 0–0 | Donetsk PR | Sukhumi, Abkhazia |
| | | Report | | Stadium: Dinamo Stadium |

== Men's football ==
=== Premier League ===
| Pos | Team | Pld | W | D | L | GF | GA | GD | Pts | Qualification or relegation |
|---|---|---|---|---|---|---|---|---|---|---|
| 1 | Nart Sukhum (C) | 12 | 10 | 0 | 2 | 34 | 20 | +14 | 30 | Champions |
| 2 | Ritsa | 12 | 10 | 0 | 2 | 29 | 8 | +21 | 30 | |
| 3 | Dinamo Sukhumi | 12 | 9 | 0 | 3 | 36 | 11 | +25 | 27 | |
| 4 | Gagra | 12 | 6 | 0 | 6 | 31 | 21 | +10 | 18 | |
| 5 | Afon | 12 | 3 | 0 | 9 | 15 | 41 | −26 | 9 | |
| 6 | Yertsakhu Ochamchira | 12 | 3 | 0 | 9 | 15 | 29 | −14 | 9 | |
| 7 | Samurzakan Gal | 12 | 1 | 0 | 11 | 12 | 42 | −30 | 3 | |

Updated to match(es) played on 24 October 2020. Source: RSSSF
(C) Champions

=== Cup competitions ===
==== Abkhazian Cup ====
===== Quarter-finals =====
====== Leg 1 ======
| 8 September 2020 | Afon | 3–1 | Sadz Tsandripsh | New Athos |

| 9 September 2020 | Yertsakhu Ochamchira | 4–0 | Samurzakan Gal | Ochamchire |

| 10 September 2020 | Gagra | 4–2 | Dynamo Sukhum |

| 11 September 2020 | Nart Sukhum | 1–3 | Ritsa | Sukhumi |

====== Leg 2 ======
| 13 September 2020 | Sadz Tsandripsh | 1–3 2–6 on aggregate | Afon |

| 14 September 2020 | Samurzakan Gal | 2–3 2–7 on aggregate | Yertsakhu Ochamchira | Gali |

| 15 September 2020 | Dynamo Sukhum | 2–1 4–5 on aggregate | Gagra | Sukhumi |

| 16 September 2020 | Ritsa | 3–1 6–2 on aggregate | Nart Sukhum | Gudauta |

===== Semi-finals =====
| 27 October 2020 | Ritsa | 2–0 | Yertsakhu Ochamchira | Gudauta |

| 28 October 2020 | Afon | 2–4 | Gagra | New Athos |

===== Final =====
1 November 2020

| Gagra | 2–1 | Ritsa |
|---|---|---|
| | Report |

==== Super Cup ====
===== Final =====
10 April 2021

| Nart Sukhum | 6–1 | Ritsa |
|---|---|---|
| | Report |
