= 2015 Abkhazian Cup =

Tournament details
- Country: Abkhazia
- Dates: 28 June 2015 - 12 October 2015
- Teams: 10

Final positions
- Champions: Ritsa (1st title)
- Runners-up: Afon

Tournament statistics
- Matches played: 17
- Goals scored: 60 (3.53 per match)

The 2015 Abkhazian Cup was the 22nd edition of Abkhazian Cup organized by Football Federation of Abkhazia. The competition began with the first leg of the preliminary round on 28 June 2015 and concluded with the final, played at Dinamo Stadium in Sukhumi, on 15 October 2015.

Ritsa won the competition for the first time after defeating Afon 3–1 after extra time in the final.

== Background ==
Nart were the defending champions having won the previous edition 6–5 on penalties following a 1–1 draw against Afon. Nart were the most successful team in the history of the competition after winning it for the eighth time in 2014. Ritsa were among the teams who had never won the competition before.

== Format ==
The competition was contested by the 10 teams in the Abkhazian Premier League for the 2015 season – namely Abazg, Afon, Dinamo Sukhum, Gagra, Nart, Ritsa, Samurzakan Gal, Shakhtyor Tkuarchal, Spartak Gulripsh and Yertsakhu Ochamchira. This was an increase on the previous season in which seven teams had contested the competition. As a result, a preliminary round was added. As with the previous season, each tie prior to the final was played over two legs and the team scoring more goals on aggregate would advance to the next round. The final was played over a single leg at Dinamo Stadium in Sukhumi.

== Preliminary round ==
The first legs of the preliminary round took place on 28 and 29 June 2015 and the second legs took place on 2 and 3 July 2015. Defending champions Nart defeated Dinamo Sukhum 9–2 on aggregate and Ritsa defeated Abazg 9–4 on aggregate.

Team 1	Agg.	Team 2	1st leg	2nd leg
Ritsa	9–4	Abazg	2–1	7–3
Dinamo Sukhum	2–9	Nart	2–3	0–6

== Quarter-finals ==
The first legs of the quarter-finals took place on 4, 5, 6 and 7 August 2015 and the second legs took place on 21, 22, 23 and 24 September 2015. Defending champions Nart came from behind after a first leg loss to defeat Gagra 3–2 on aggregate and Spartak Gulripsh defeated Yertsakhu Ochamchira 2–0 on aggregate. Ritsa also came from behind after a first leg loss to defeat Shakhtyor Tkuarchal 11–3 on aggregate and Afon defeated Samurzakan Gal 6–0 on aggregate.

Team 1	Agg.	Team 2	1st leg	2nd leg
Spartak Gulripsh	2–0	Yertsakhu Ochamchira	0–0	2–0
Shakhtyor Tkuarchal	3–11	Ritsa	3–2	0–9
Nart	3–2	Gagra	0–1	3–1
Afon	6–0	Samurzakan Gal	3–0	3–0

== Semi-finals ==
The first legs of the semi-finals took place on 1 and 2 October 2015 and the second legs took place on 8 and 9 October 2015. Nart's defence of their title came to end after losing 1–0 on aggregate to Afon and Ritsa advanced to the final with a 4–1 aggregate victory against Spartak Gulripsh.

Team 1	Agg.	Team 2	1st leg	2nd leg
Nart	0–1	Afon	0–0	0–1
Ritsa	4–1	Spartak Gulripsh	3–1	1–0

== Final ==
Ritsa won the competition for the first time after they defeated Afon 3–1 after extra time in the final on 15 October 2015 at Dinamo Stadium in Sukhumi.

Team 1	Score	Team 2
Ritsa	3–1 (a.e.t.)	Afon
