= 2017 Abkhazian Cup =

Tournament details
- Country: Abkhazia
- Dates: June 13 - October 12, 2017
- Teams: 10

Final positions
- Champions: Nart Sukhum (10th title)
- Runner-up: FC Gagra

Tournament statistics
- Matches played: 25
- Goals scored: 84 (3.36 per match)

The 2017 Abkhazian Cup was the 24th edition of Abkhazian Cup organized by Football Federation of Abkhazia. The competition was held in the month of May.

== Participating teams ==
This edition of the competition was attended by 10 teams:

- FC Afon,
- Samurzakan Gal,
- FC Gagra,
- FC Dinamo Sukhum,
- Nart Sukhum
- Football Club Yertsakhu Ochamchira
- Football Club Spartak Gulripsh
- Football Club Shakhtyor Tkuarchal
- Football Club Abazg Sukhum
- Ritsa FC.

The Abkhazia Cup champion team qualifies for the Abkhazia Super Cup final and face the Abkhazian Premier League champion team.

The final of the Abkhazia Cup took place on October 12, 2017. The two teams qualified for the grand final match were Nart Sukhum and FC Gagra.

== Games by stage ==
=== First stage ===
==== Group A ====
[Jun 13]

Ritsa FC 2-1 FC Afon

[Jun 14]

FC Dinamo Sukhum 2-1 Samurzakan Gal

[Jun 20]

FC Afon 0-1 FC Dinamo Sukhum

[Jun 21]

Football Club Yertsakhu Ochamchira 0-3 Ritsa FC

[Jun 27]

FC Dinamo Sukhum 2-1 Football Club Yertsakhu Ochamchira

[Jun 28]

Samurzakan Gal 0-0 FC Afon

[Jul 4]

Football Club Yertsakhu Ochamchira 2-2 Samurzakan Gal

[Jul 5]

Ritsa FC 2-1 FC Dinamo Sukhum

[Jul 11]

Samurzakan Gal - Ritsa FC

[Jul 12]

FC Afon - Football Club Yertsakhu Ochamchira

Table:

1.Ritsa Gudauta          3   3  0  0   7- 2   9  Qualified
2.Dinamo Sukhum          4   3  0  1   6- 4   9  Qualified
- - - - - - - - - - - - - - - - - - - - - - - -
3.Samurzakan Gal         3   0  2  1   3- 4   2
4.FK Afon                3   0  1  2   1- 3   1
5.Yertsakhu Ochamchira   3   0  1  2   3- 7   1

==== Group B ====
[Jun 15]

Nart Sukhum 4-2 FC Gagra

[Jun 16]

Abazg Sukhum 2-2 Spartak

[Jun 22]

FC Gagra 6-1 Abazg Sukhum

[Jun 23]

Shakhtyor 1-1 Nart Sukhum

[Jun 29]

Abazg Sukhum 3-3 Shakhtyor

[Jul 6]

Shakhtyor 3-4 Spartak

[Jul 7]

Nart Sukhum 13-4 Abazg Sukhum

[Jul 10]

Spartak - FC Gagra

[Jul 13]

Spartak 0-1 Nart Sukhum

[Jul 14]

FC Gagra - Shakhtyor

Table:

1.Nart Sukhum            4   3  1  0  19- 7  10  Qualified
2.Spartak Gulripsh       3   1  1  1   6- 6   4
- - - - - - - - - - - - - - - - - - - - - - - -
3.FK Gagra               2   1  0  1   8- 5   3
4.Shakhtyor Tkuarchal    3   0  2  1   7- 8   2
5.Abazg Sukhum           4   0  2  2  10-24   2

NB: Gagra qualified as group runners-up

=== Semifinals ===
First Legs [Oct 2]

FC Dinamo Sukhum 0-2 Nart Sukhum

[Oct 3]

FC Gagra 0-0 Ritsa FC

Second Legs [Oct 6]

Nart Sukhum 3-1 FC Dinamo Sukhum

[Oct 7]

Ritsa FC 1-2 FC Gagra

=== Final ===
[Oct 12]

Nart Sukhum 4-1 FC Gagra
