= 2019 in Abkhazian football =

Football in Abkhazia
- Season: 2020

Men's football
- Victory Cup: Ritsa
- Abkhazian Cup: Nart Sukhum
- Super Cup: Nart Sukhum

The 2019 season is the 21st season of competitive association football in Abkhazia.

== National teams ==
=== Abkhazia national football team ===
==== Results and fixtures ====
===== 2019 CONIFA European Football Cup =====
====== Group A ======
Pos	Team	Pld	W	D	L	GF	GA	GD	Pts	Qualification or relegation
1	Abkhazia	3	2	1	0	5	2	+3	7	Advance to semi-finals
2	Chameria	3	2	0	1	9	4	+5	6	Advance to semi-finals
3	Artsakh	3	1	1	1	5	7	−2	4	
4	Sápmi	3	0	0	3	2	8	−6	0	

Source: ConIFA June 2019 Archives

2 June 2019	Abkhazia	3–1	Chameria	Askeran, Artsakh
16:00 UTC+4	Maskayev 48'; Logua 49', 74'	Report	Prendi 30'	Stadium: Askeran City Stadium; Attendance: 500; Referee: Ahmed Sabah Radha Ahmed

3 June 2019	Sápmi	0–1	Abkhazia	Martakert, Artsakh
18:00 UTC+4		Report	Dgebuadze 45+2'	Stadium: Vigen Shirinyan Stadium; Attendance: 2,300; Referee: Ahmed Sabah Radha Ahmed

4 June 2019	Artsakh	1–1	Abkhazia	Martuni, Artsakh
18:00 UTC+4	Mkrtchyan 33'	Report	Shabat Logua 8'	Stadium: Avakyan Arena; Attendance: 1,080; Referee: Dmitrii Zhukov

====== Semi-finals ======
6 June 2019	Abkhazia	1–1 (0–3 p)	Western Armenia	Stepanakert, Artsakh
18:30 UTC+4	Khugaev 33'	Report	Manoyan 32' (pen.)	Stadium: Stepanakert Republican Stadium; Attendance: 7,000; Referee: Ivan Mrkalj

====== Third-place match ======
8 June 2019	Abkhazia	0–0 (5–4 p)	Chameria	Stepanakert, Artsakh
		Report		Stadium: Stepanakert Republican Stadium; Attendance: 6,200; Referee: Dmitrii Zhukov

== Men's football ==
=== Victory Cup ===
The results of Gagra vs Nath Aqwa and Dinamo Aqwa are unknown, but it is known that Gagra finished second.

Pos	Team	Pld	W	D	L	GF	GA	GD	Pts	Qualification or relegation
1	Ritsa	6	4	1	1	20	10	+10	13	Advance to Final
2	Gagra	4	2	0	2	6	3	+3	6	Advance to Final
3	Narth Aqwa	5	2	1	2	9	14	−5	7	
4	Dinamo Aqwa	5	1	0	4	4	12	−8	3	

Updated to match(es) played on 15 November 2019. Source: RSSSF

==== Final ====
18 November 2019

Ritsa	1–0	Gagra
Gublia 90+3'	Report

Dinamo Stadium, Sukhumi

=== Cup competitions ===
==== Abkhazian Cup ====
===== Group stage =====
====== Group A ======
Pos	Team	Pld	W	D	L	GF	GA	GD	Pts	Qualification or relegation
1	Dinamo Sukhumi	2	1	1	0	4	1	+3	4	Advance to Semi-final
2	Afon	2	0	2	0	2	2	0	2	Advance to Semi-final
3	Samurzakan Gal	2	0	1	1	1	4	−3	1	

Updated to match(es) played on unknown. Source: RSSSF

====== Group B ======
Pos	Team	Pld	W	D	L	GF	GA	GD	Pts	Qualification or relegation
1	Ritsa	2	1	0	1	3	2	+1	3	Advance to Semi-final
2	Nart Sukhum	2	1	0	1	3	2	+1	3	Advance to Semi-final
3	Gagra	2	1	0	1	2	4	−2	3	

Updated to match(es) played on unknown. Source: RSSSF

===== Semi-finals =====
9 May 2019	Dinamo Sukhumi	0–3	Nart Sukhum	Sukhumi
		Report

10 May 2019	Ritsa	3–1	Afon	Gudauta
		Report

===== Final =====
14 May 2019

Nart Sukhum	4–0	Ritsa
	Report

===== Super Cup =====
====== Final ======
31 July 2020

Nart Sukhum	2–2 (a.e.t.)	Gagra
	Report
Penalties
	7–6
