= 2016 Abkhazian Cup =

Tournament details
- Country: Abkhazia
- Dates: 4 August 2016 - 12 October 2016
- Teams: 10

Final positions
- Champions: Nart (9th title)
- Runners-up: Gagra

Tournament statistics
- Matches played: 17
- Goals scored: 64 (3.76 per match)

The 2016 Abkhazian Cup was the 23rd edition of the Abkhazian Cup organised by the Football Federation of Abkhazia. The competition began with the first leg of the preliminary round on 4 August 2016 and concluded with the final, played at Dinamo Stadium in Sukhumi, on 12 October 2016.

Nart won the competition for the ninth time after defeating Gagra 2–1 in the final.

== Background ==
Ritsa were the defending champions having won the previous edition 3–1 after extra time in the final against Afon. Nart were the most successful team in the history of the competition after winning it for the eighth time in 2014.

== Format ==
Like the previous season, the competition was contested by the 10 teams in the Abkhazian Premier League for the 2016 season – namely Abazg, Afon, Dinamo Sukhum, Gagra, Nart, Ritsa, Samurzakan Gal, Shakhtyor Tkuarchal, Spartak Gulripsh and Yertsakhu Ochamchira. As with the previous season, each tie, starting with the preliminary round and prior to the finalm was played over two legs and the team scoring more goals on aggregate would advance to the next round. The final was played over a single leg at Dinamo Stadium in Sukhumi.

== Preliminary round ==
The first legs of the preliminary round took place on 4 and 5 August 2016 and the second legs took place on 10 and 11 August 2016. Defending champions Ritsa fell at the first hurdle. After a 3–3 draw on aggregate, they lost on penalties to Gagra. Nart also advanced to the quarter-finals after defeating Shakhtyor Tkuarchal 7–1 on aggregate.

| Team 1 | Agg. | Team 2 | 1st leg | 2nd leg |
|---|---|---|---|---|
| Gagra | 3–3 | Ritsa | 2–1 | 1–2 |
| Nart | 7–1 | Shakhtyor Tkuarchal | 3–1 | 4–0 |

== Quarter-finals ==
The first legs of the quarter-finals took place on 16, 17, 18 and 19 August 2016 and the second legs took place on 26, 27, 28 and 29 September 2016. Despite losing the second leg, Gagra defeated Dinamo Sukhum 4–2 on aggregate. Abazg were defeated heavily by Yertsakhu Ochamchira 14–1 on aggregate and Afon advanced 6–4 on aggregate despite a second leg defeat to Spartak Gulripsh. Nart defeated Samurzakan Gal 5–1 in the first leg and were given a walkover in the second leg.

| Team 1 | Agg. | Team 2 | 1st leg | 2nd leg |
|---|---|---|---|---|
| Gagra | 4–2 | Dinamo Sukhum | 4–1 | 0–1 |
| Yertsakhu Ochamchira | 14–1 | Abazg | 11–1 | 3–0 |
| Samurzakan Gal | 1–5 | Nart | 1–5 | w/o |
| Afon | 6–4 | Spartak Gulripsh | 4–0 | 2–4 |

== Semi-finals ==
The first legs of the semi-finals took place on 3 and 5 October 2016 and the second legs took place on 7 and 8 October 2016. Gagra won both legs of their tie against Yertsakhu Ochamchira 2–1 to advance to the final 4–2 on aggregate. Nart advanced on away goals after a 2–2 draw on aggregate with Afon.

| Team 1 | Agg. | Team 2 | 1st leg | 2nd leg |
|---|---|---|---|---|
| Gagra | 4–2 | Yertsakhu Ochamchira | 2–1 | 2–1 |
| Afon | 2–2 (a) | Nart | 1–2 | 1–0 |

== Final ==
Goals from Feras Ismail and Nikita Filatov helped Nart to win the competition for the ninth time after they defeated Gagra 2–1 in the final on 12 October 2016 at Dinamo Stadium in Sukhumi.

| Team 1 | Score | Team 2 |
|---|---|---|
| Nart | 2–1 | Gagra |
