= 2018 Abkhazian Cup =

Tournament details
- Country: Abkhazia
- Dates: May 2018
- Teams: 6

Final positions
- Champions: FC Gagra (5th title)
- Runner-up: Nart Sukhum

Tournament statistics
- Matches played: 16
- Goals scored: 53 (3.31 per match)

The 2018 Abkhazian Cup was the 24th edition of Abkhazian Cup organized by Football Federation of Abkhazia. The competition was held in the month of May.

== Participating teams ==
This edition of the competition was attended by 6 teams:

- FC Afon,
- Samurzakan Gal,
- FC Gagra,
- FC Dinamo Sukhum,
- Nart Sukhum
- Ritsa FC.

The Abkhazia Cup champion team qualifies for the Abkhazia Super Cup final and face the Abkhazian Premier League champion team.

The final of the Abkhazia Cup took place on October 24, 2018. The two teams qualified for the grand final match were Nart Sukhum and FC Gagra.

The match was tied by 2x2, and the match was decided in the pemaltis, where the team of FC Gagra won by 5x4.

== Games by stage ==
=== First stage ===
==== Group A ====
[Sep 19] Ritsa FC 3-0 FC Dinamo Sukhum [Sep 23] Samurzakan Gal 2-1 Ritsa FC [Sep 27] FC Dinamo Sukhum 1-2 Samurzakan Gal [Oct 1] FC Dinamo Sukhum 3-4 Ritsa FC [Oct 5] Ritsa FC 1-2 Samurzakan Gal [Oct 9] Samurzakan n/p FC Dinamo Sukhum

Final Table:

1.Samurzakan Gal          3   3  0  0   6- 3   9  Qualified
2.Ritsa FC                4   2  0  2   9- 7   6  Qualified
- - - - - - - - - - - - - - - - - - - - - - - -
3.FC Dinamo Sukhum        3   0  0  3   4- 9   0

==== Group B ====
[Sep 20] Nart Sukhum 5-1 FC Gagra [Sep 24] FC Afon 1-1 Nart Sukhum [Sep 28] FC Gagra 2-1 FC Afon [Oct 2] FC Gagra 0-3 Nart Sukhum [Oct 6] Nart Sukhum 2-1 FC Afon [Oct 10] FC Afon 0-2 FC Gagra

Final Table:

1.Nart Sukhum            4   3  1  0  11- 3  10  Qualified
2.FC Gagra               4   2  0  2   5- 9   6  Qualified
- - - - - - - - - - - - - - - - - - - - - - - -
3.FC Afon                4   0  1  3   3- 7   1

== Semifinals ==
First Legs [Oct 14]

FC Gagra 7-3 Samurzakan Gal

[Oct 15]

Ritsa FC 1-3 Nart Sukhum

Second Legs [Oct 18]

Samurzakan Gal o/w FC Gagra

[Oct 19]

Nart Sukhum 2-0 Ritsa FC

== Final ==
[Oct 24, stadion Dinamo, Sukhum] Nart Sukhum 2-2 FC Gagra [aet, 4-5 pen]
