= 2019 Abkhazian Cup =

Tournament details
- Country: Abkhazia
- Dates: May 2019
- Teams: 6

Final positions
- Champions: Nart Sukhum (11th title)
- Runner-up: Ritsa FC

Tournament statistics
- Matches played: 9
- Goals scored: 26 (2.89 per match)

The 2019 Abkhazian Cup was the 25th edition of Abkhazian Cup organized by Football Federation of Abkhazia. The competition was held in the month of May.

== Participating teams ==
This edition of the competition was attended by 8 teams:

- FC Afon,
- Samurzakan Gal,
- FC Gagra,
- FC Dinamo Sukhum,
- Nart Sukhum
- Ritsa FC.

The Abkhazia Cup champion team qualifies for the Abkhazia Super Cup final and face the Abkhazian Premier League champion team.

The final of the Abkhazia Cup took place on May 14, 2019. The two teams qualified for the grand final match were Nart Sukhum and Ritsa FC.

Nart Sukhum's team won by the score of 4x0 and became champion of the Abkhazia Cup 2020. With this victory, the club already has eleven Abkhazia Cup trophies.

== Games by stage ==
=== First stage ===
==== Group A ====
Afon 1-1 Dinamo Dinamo 3-0 Samurzakan Samurzakan 1-1 Afon

Final Table:

1.Dinamo Sukhum          2   1  1  0   4- 1   4  Qualified
2.FK Afon                2   0  2  0   2- 2   2  Qualified
- - - - - - - - - - - - - - - - - - - - - - - -
3.Samurzakan Gal         2   0  1  1   1- 4   1

==== Group B ====
Nart 0-2 Ritsa Gagra 0-3 Nart Ritsa 1-2 Gagra

Final Table:

1.Ritsa Gudauta          2   1  0  1   3- 2   3  Qualified
2.Nart Sukhum            2   1  0  1   3- 2   3  Qualified
- - - - - - - - - - - - - - - - - - - - - - - -
3.FK Gagra               2   1  0  1   2- 4   3

=== Semifinals ===
[May 9] Dinamo 0-3 Nart [May 10] Ritsa 3-1 Afon

=== Final ===
[May 14] Nart 4-0 Ritsa
