= 2020 Abkhazian Cup =

Tournament details
- Country: Abkhazia
- Dates: 8 September – 1 November 2020
- Teams: 8

Final positions
- Champions: FC Gagra (6th title)
- Runner-up: Ritsa FC

Tournament statistics
- Matches played: 11
- Goals scored: 45 (4.09 per match)

The 2020 Abkhazian Cup was the 26th edition of Abkhazian Cup organized by Football Federation of Abkhazia. The competition began on 8 September 2020 and ended in 1 November the same year.

== Participating teams ==
This edition of the competition was attended by 8 teams: FC Afon, Sadz Tsandripsh, Yertsakhu Ochamchira, Samurzakan Gal, FC Gagra, Dynamo Sukhum, Nart Sukhum and Ritsa FC.

The Abkhazia Cup champion team qualifies for the Abkhazia Super Cup final and face the Abkhazian Premier League champion team.

The final of the Abkhazia Cup took place on November 1, 2020. The two teams qualified for the grand final match were FC Gagra and Ritsa FC.

FC Gagra's team won by the score of 2x1 and became champion of the Abkhazia Cup 2020. With this victory, the club already has six Abkhazia Cup trophies.

== Games by stage ==
=== Stage 1 ===
==== First Match ====
Date	Team 1	Score	Team 2
08/09/2020	FC Afon	3–1	Sadz Tsandripsh
09.09.2020	Yertsakhu Ochamchira	4–0	Samurzakan Gal
10/09/2020	FC Gagra	4–2	Dynamo Sukhum
11/09/2020	Nart Sukhum	1–3	Ritsa FC

==== Second Match ====
Date	Team 1	Score	Team 2
13/09/2020	Sadz Tsandripsh	1–3	FC Afon
14/09/2020	Samurzakan Gal	2–3	Yertsakhu Ochamchira
15/09/2020	Dynamo Sukhum	2–1	FC Gagra
16/09/2020	Ritsa FC	3–1	Nart Sukhum

=== Stage 2 (Semi-finals) ===
Date	Team 1	Score	Team 2
27/10/2020	Ritsa FC	2–0	Yertsakhu Ochamchira
28/10/2020	FC Afon	2–4	FC Gagra

=== Final ===
Date	Team 1	Score	Team 2
1/112020	FC Gagra	2–1	Ritsa FC
