= 2020 Abkhazian Premier League =

Tournament details
- Country: Abkhazia
- Dates: 4 August – 24 October 2020
- Teams: 7

Final positions
- Champions: Nart Sukhum (1st title)
- Runners-up: Ritsa FC

Tournament statistics
- Matches played: 42
- Goals scored: 172 (4.1 per match)
- Top goal scorer(s): Alan Kvitsiniya (Nart); Temur Agrba (Nart)

The 2020 Abkhazian Premier League was the 28th edition of Abkhazian Premier League organized by Football Federation of Abkhazia.

== Participating teams ==
This edition of the competition was attended by 10 teams:

- Nart Sukhum,
- Ritsa FC,
- FC Dinamo Sukhum,
- FC Gagra,
- FC Afon,
- Football Club Yertsakhu Ochamchira,
- Samurzakan Gal.

The Abkhazian Premier League champion team qualifies for the Abkhazia Super Cup final and faces the Abkhazian Cup champion team.

The team that won the competition was Nart Sukhum, who scored 30 points.

== Final Table ==
Pos	Team	Pld	W	D	L	GF	GA	GD	Pts	Qualification or relegation
1	Nart Sukhum (C)	12	10	0	2	34	20	+14	30	Champions
2	Ritsa Gudauta	12	10	0	2	29	8	+21	30	
3	Dinamo Sukhumi	12	9	0	3	36	11	+25	27	
4	FK Gagra	12	6	0	6	31	21	+10	18	
5	FK Afon	12	3	0	9	15	41	−26	9	
6	Yertsakhu Ochamchira	12	3	0	9	15	29	−14	9	
7	Samurzakan Gal	12	1	0	11	12	42	−30	3	

Updated to match(es) played on unknown. Source: RSSSF
(C) Champions

=== Results ===
==== Round 1 ====
Aug 4 1	Yertsakhu	1-0	Samurzakan	(Abkhazia)
		Report

Aug 6 1	Dinamo	4-0	Gagra	(Abkhazia)
		Report

Aug 7 1	Afon	1-4	Ritsa	(Abkhazia)
		Report

==== Round 2 ====
Aug 9 2	FC Nart Sukhum	5-1	FC Afon Novy Afon	(Abkhazia)
		Report

Aug 10 2	FC Gagra	2-1	FC Yertsakhu Ochamchira	(Abkhazia)
		Report

Aug 11 2	Ritsa FC	1-0	FC Dinamo Sukhumi	(Abkhazia)
		Report

==== Round 3 ====
Aug 14 3	FC Afon	1-2	FC Samurzakan	(Abkhazia)
		Report

Aug 15 3	FC Dinamo Sukhumi	1-2	FC Nart Sukhumi	(Abkhazia)
		Report

Aug 16 3	FC Gagra	0-1	Ritsa FC	(Abkhazia)
		Report

==== Round 4 ====
[Aug 19]

Samurzakan 0-2 Dinamo

[Aug 20]

Ritsa 3-0 Yertsakhu

[Aug 21]

Nart 2-1 Gagra

Afon bye

==== Round 5 ====
[Aug 24]

Yertsakhu 3-4 Afon

[Aug 25]

Gagra 8-2 Samurzakan

[Aug 26]

Ritsa 2-4 Nart

Dinamo bye

==== Round 6 ====
[Aug 29]

Afon 0-1 Dinamo

[Aug 30]

Nart 3-0 Yertsakhu

[Aug 31]

Samurzakan 0-3 Ritsa

Gagra bye

==== Round 7 ====
[Sep 3]

Yertsakhu 2-1 Dinamo

[Sep 4]

Gagra 4-0 Afon

[Sep 5]

Nart 5-3 Samurzakan

Ritsa bye

==== Round 8 ====
[Sep 18]

Samurzakan 2-4 Yertsakhu

[Sep 19]

Gagra 0-4 Dinamo

[Sep 20]

Ritsa 6-0 Afon

Nart bye

==== Round 9 ====
[Sep 28]

Yertsakhu 2-3 Gagra

[Sep 30]

Dinamo 1-0 Ritsa

[Oct 25]

Afon 0-3 Nart

Samurzakan bye

==== Round 10 ====
[Oct 3]

Samurzakan 2-3 Afon

[Oct 4]

Nart 4-7 Dinamo

[Oct 5]

Ritsa 3-2 Gagra

Yertsakhu bye

==== Round 11 ====
[Oct 8]

Dinamo 6-0 Samurzakan

[Oct 9]

Yertsakhu 0-1 Ritsa

[Oct 10]

Gagra 1-2 Nart

Afon bye

==== Round 12 ====
[Oct 13]

Afon 3-1 Yertsakhu

[Oct 14]

Samurzakan 0-4 Gagra

[Oct 15]

Nart 0-2 Ritsa

Dinamo bye

==== Round 13 ====
[Oct 18]

Dinamo 4-2 Afon

[Oct 19]

Ritsa 3-0 Samurzakan

[Oct 20]

Yertsakhu 1-2 Nart

Gagra bye

==== Round 14 ====
[Sep 29]

Samurzakan 1-2 Nart

[Oct 23]

Afon 0-6 Gagra

[Oct 24]

Dinamo 5-0 Yertsakhu

Ritsa bye

== Top Goalscorers ==
Rank	Player	Club	Goals
1	Alan Kvitsiniya	Nart Sukhum	11
1	Temur Agrba	Nart Sukhum	11
