= List of football clubs in Abkhazia =

This is a list of football (soccer) clubs in Abkhazia, including displaced clubs operating in Georgia.

== A ==
- Football Club Abazg Sukhum
- F.C. Afon Novy Afon

== K ==
- Football Club Kiaraz Pitsunda

== N ==
- Football Club Nart Sukhum

== R ==
- Ritsa Football Club

== S ==
- Football Club Samurzakan Gal

== Y ==
- Football Club Yertsakhu Ochamchira
