= Sport in Abkhazia =

Football is a major sport in Abkhazia (a territory in the Caucasus). During Soviet times, the main club within Abkhazia itself was FC Dinamo Sukhumi, but Abkhazian footballers were prominent in the Georgian team FC Dinamo Tbilisi and in other Soviet teams. In 1994, after its declaration of independence from Georgia, Abkhazia organised a nine-team amateur league.

Outside football, many Abkhazian sportsmen participate in international competitions as Russian citizens, especially in boxing and freestyle wrestling. A basketball team based in the capital Sukhumi plays in a Russian league.

== Football ==
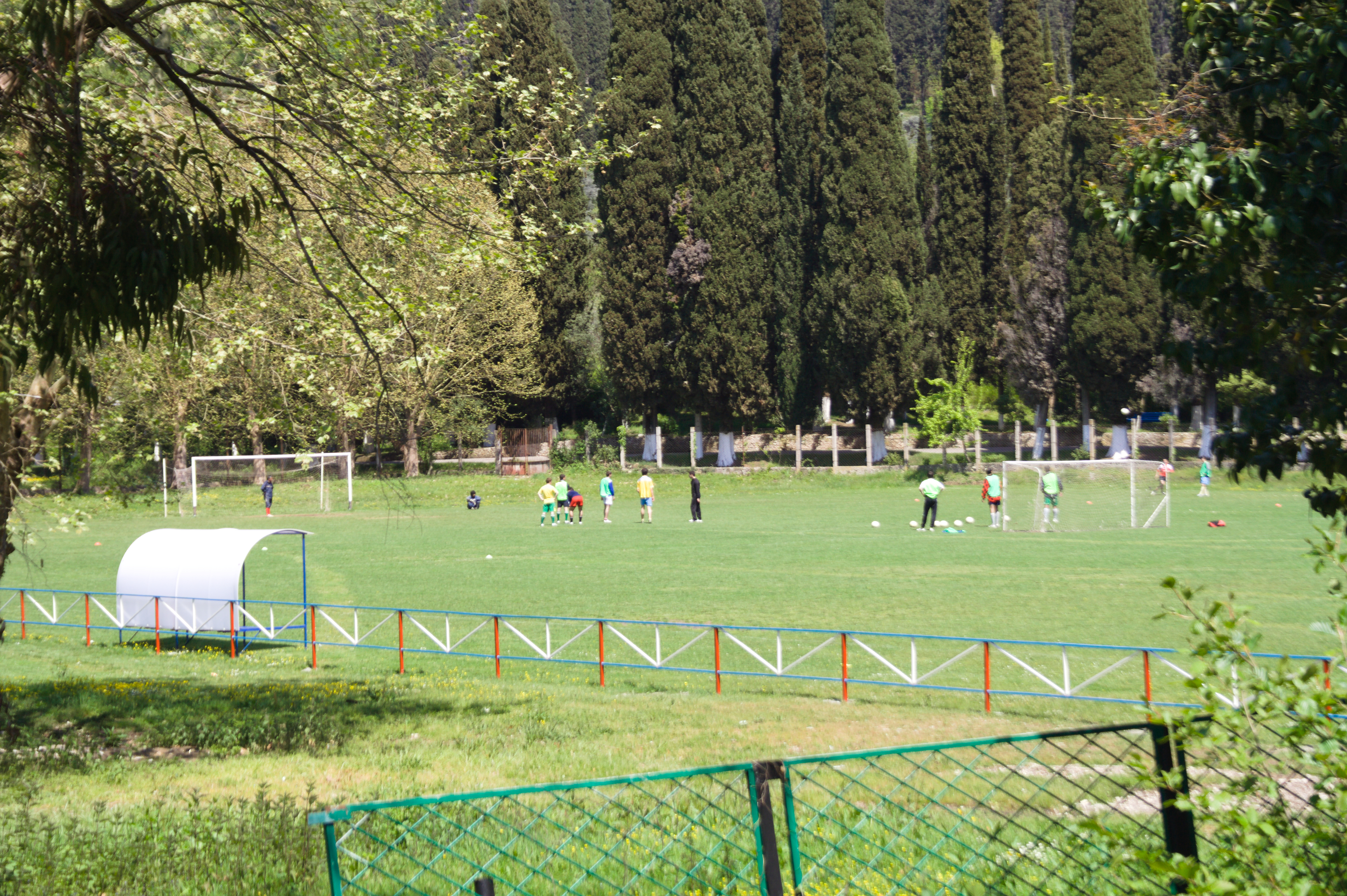

Football was the most popular sport in Abkhazia during Soviet times. The main club of the republic, FC Dinamo Sukhumi, played mostly in the lower leagues of Soviet football. However, Abkhazia produced several football talents who played in the top Georgian team FC Dinamo Tbilisi and in other Soviet teams. Natives of Abkhazia Vitaly Daraselia, Nikita (Mkrtych) Simonian, Avtandil Gogoberidze, Niyazbey Dzyapshipa, Giorgi Gavasheli, Temuri Ketsbaia and Akhrik Tsveiba were among the most prominent footballers of the Soviet Union.

Dinamo Sukhumi achieved their best result in 1991 finishing in 10th place in the first league (second tier of Soviet football). They were the only Georgian team to participate in the Soviet football system in 1990–1991 as other Georgian teams left for political reasons before the 1990 season. Several players of the 1990–1991 Dinamo Sukhumi squad including Sergei Ovchinnikov and the Adzhindzhal brothers played later for Russian teams and achieved varying degrees of success, as did Oleg Dolmatov, Dinamo's coach in 1990–1991.

After Abkhazia broke away from Georgia, it organised the Abkhazian Premier League founded in 1994 which is not part of any international football union. The League consists of 9 teams as of the 2025-2026 season, while 12 teams take part in the second division of Abkhaz Football 'National Abkhazian Football League'. The most successful teams in the Abkhazian Premier League are Nart Sukhum with 15 league titles and FC Gagra with 5 League titles. Abkhazia has two domestic cups, the Abkhazian Cup and additionally the Abkhazia Super Cup in which the Winner of the Apnsy Super League plays the Winner of the Abkhazian Cup.

A team made up of players from various clubs of the Abkhazian Premier league competes in the recently established Media Football League. It operates not as the National team, but a club which draws players from Abkhazia, while they continue to play for their respective clubs, such as Aksentiy Chaligava who plays for both FC Apsny and Nart Sukhum.

The Tbilisi-based FC Dinamo Sokhumi, composed chiefly of Georgian IDPs from Sukhumi, play in the Umaglesi Liga, the top division in Georgian football.

Since 2012 Abkhazia has been operating its own national football team and are members of the Confederation of Independent Football Associations. The team includes a number of professional footballers playing in countries such as Russia and Turkey. Many players have played for other national teams such as Feras Esmaeel who played for the Syrian national football team until 2016 and made 81 caps before playing for Abkhazia.

Abkhazia hosted the 2016 ConIFA World Football Cup tournament.

== Other sports ==
The majority of Abkhazia's population have Russian citizenship, so Abkhazian sportsmen are allowed to participate in international competitions as Russian citizens under the Russian flag. They had their biggest successes in boxing (2005 European Champion David Arshba; 2006 Russian Championship prize-winner Aslan Akhba) and freestyle wrestling (2006 American Airlines Freestyle Wrestling Tournament winner Denis Tsargush).

The national basketball team of Abkhazia played its first game ever with the Turkish Republic of Northern Cyprus on 27 May 2015, where Abkhaz team won by 76–59. Abkhaz basketball team "Apsny" also plays in the Russian Basketball League's Third-Tier in the Championship of the North Caucaus Federal District and the Southern Federal District. Abkhazia national basketball appear in Phygital basketball at 2024 BRICS Games. The team play against Russia, Belarus, Armenia and Colombia.

Abkhazia was take part in 2024 BRICS Games and won one gold in boxing.

== See also ==
- Sport in Georgia (country)
