= Football Club Kiaraz Pitsunda =

Football club of Pitsunda, in the disputed territory of Abkhazia

FC Kiaraz Pitsunda
- Full name: Football Club Kiaraz Pitsunda
- Founded: 1980
- Ground: Pitsunda, Abkhazia, Georgia
- League: National Abkhazian Football League; Abkhazian Cup; Abkhazia Super Cup
Home colours	Away colours

Football Club Kiaraz Pitsunda is a football club in the city of Pitsunda, in the state of Abkhazia, an autonomous region of Georgia (Country), that competes in the second division of association football in Abkhazia the National Abkhazian Football League.

Its shield is a green circle with a red hexagon inside. And inside the hexagon there is a white hand extended between seven white stars.

== History ==
Headquartered in the city of Pitsunda in the state of Abkhazia, the club is affiliated with the Football Federation of Abkhazia. It played in the first football division in the territory for the last time in 2013.

The Abkhazia football league was professionalized in 1994. In this first edition, Dinamo Sokhumi won.

== First Title ==
In 1995, in the second edition of the Abkhazian Premier League, the FC Kiaraz Pitsunda team managed to reach their first title in the Abkhazian Premier League. This edition had the Psyrtsha Afon team in second place and the FC Yertsakhu Ochamchira team in third.

After the Abkhazian Premier League runner-up in 1996, when FC Yertsakhu Ochamchira won the title, FC Kiaraz Pitsunda became the league champion again the following year, 1997. The 1997 edition ended with champion FC Kiaraz Pitsunda, SKA-Dinamo Sukhum in second and Bzana Kutol in third.

== The height ==
After seven years without winning in the Abkhazian Premier League, the Kiaraz Pitsunda team managed to have a perfect season in 2004. As well as winning their third title in the Abkhazian Premier League, the club was also champion of the Abkhazia Cup.

== After 2004 ==
After the perfect 2004 season, the team still managed to run a runner-up the following season. The FC Nart Sukhum team won the 2005 league.

In 2007 the team ranked third in the league.

The team draws attention again in the 2009 season, when in addition to a third place in the Abkhazian Premier League, the team reaches the final of the Abkhazia Cup.

== 2013 ==
In 2013 the team played in the Abkhazia league and finished the competition in fifth place with 18 points, 5 wins, 3 draws and 6 losses. He scored 22 goals and conceded 26.

== 2026 ==
In 2026 the team was officially relaunched, joining the second division National Abkhazian Football League, after last competing in the Abkhazian Premier League in the 2013 season

== Titles ==
=== Abkhazian Premier League ===
- Champions(3)

1995, 1997, 2004

- Runners-Up(2)

1996, 2005

- Third Place(2)

2007, 2008

=== Abkhazian Cup ===
- Champions(1)

2004

- Runners-Up(3)

1996, 1997, 2005
