= United Koreans in Japan football team =

Football team in Japan

United Koreans in Japan
- Association: United Korean Football Association in Japan
- Confederation: ConIFA
- Head coach: An Yong-hak
- Most caps: Shin Yong-ki (11)
- Top scorer: Tae An-sung (4)
- Home stadium: Akabane Park Stadium
First colours	Second colours

First international
- United Koreans in Japan 1–0 Székely Land (Sukhumi, Abkhazia; 30 May 2016)

Biggest win
- (Ryukyu Islands) Ryūkyū 0–9 United Koreans in Japan (Nakagusuku, Japan; 26 November 2016)

Biggest defeat
- United Koreans in Japan 0–3 Kurdistan Region (Sukhumi, Abkhazia; 31 May 2016)

ConIFA World Football Cup
- Appearances: 2 (first in 2016)
- Best result: Quarter-finals (7th), 2016

The United Koreans in Japan official football team represents the Korean population living in Japan. The team includes players holding passports from North Korea, South Korea and Japan. The team, run by the United Korean Football Association in Japan (UKFAJ), joined ConIFA in 2015, and played its first matches at the 2016 ConIFA World Football Cup.

== History ==
The national team grew out of the local football club for Koreans in Japan, FC Korea, which formed in 1961 and currently plays in the Kanto Soccer League, and is still the base of the national team. Upon its formation, it joined ConIFA, and became one of the Asian teams invited to play at the 2016 ConIFA World Football Cup on 9 January 2016. The team progressed to the quarter finals after beating Székely Land 1-0 in the group stages, but lost on penalties to Northern Cyprus, thus putting them in the placement rounds, where they eventually finished 7th in the overall competition.

In 2018 they were confirmed as participating in the 2018 ConIFA World Football Cup. For the tournament, they appointed former North Korean international An Yong-hak as player-manager.

== Matches ==
Legend

Win Draw Loss

30 May 2016 2016 ConIFA WFC Group B	United Koreans in Japan	1–0	Székely Land	Dinamo Stadium, Sukhumi
15:00 GET	Lee Son-chon 60'

31 May 2016 2016 ConIFA WFC Group B	United Koreans of Japan (Korea)	0–3	Kurdistan Region	Dinamo Stadium, Sukhumi
15:00 GET		Report	Diyar Rahman 27'; Miran Khesro 45' (pen.); Hunar Ahmad 73'

1 June 2016 2016 ConIFA WFC Quarter-Final	United Koreans in Japan	1–1 (2–4 p)	Northern Cyprus	Dinamo Stadium, Sukhumi
15:00 GET	On Song-tae 54'		Ünal Kaya 31'
	Penalties
	Kim Kwang-woo (penalty missed); On Song-tae (penalty scored); Kim Su-yong (penalty scored); An Suug-tae (penalty missed)		(penalty scored) Esin Sonay; (penalty scored) Halil Turan; (penalty scored) Ünal Kaya; (penalty scored) Ibrahim Çıdamlı

3 June 2016 2016 ConIFA WFC Placement R1	United Koreans in Japan	1–2	Sápmi	Dinamo Stadium, Sukhumi
15:00 GET	Kim Su-yong 2'		? 9' (pen.) ? 61'

4 June 2016 2016 ConIFA WFC Placement R2	United Koreans in Japan	1–1 (4–2 p)	Kurdistan Region	Daur Akhvlediani Stadium, Gagra
11:00 GET	An Suug-tae 90+5'		? 80'
	Penalties
	Kim Su-yong (penalty missed); An Suug-tae (penalty scored); Kim Kwang-woo (penalty scored); Huo Yang (penalty scored); Shin Yong-ki (penalty scored)		Penalty scored Penalty missed

26 November 2016 International Friendly	Ryukyu	0–9	United Koreans in Japan	Gosamaru Field, Nakagusuku, Japan
12:00 JST			Anne-Sung Tae; Yuuki Gomi; Lee Seong-cheol; Kang Awe; Akimoto Kaijin; Lee Yoshiaki

31 May 2018 2018 ConIFA WFC Group D	United Koreans in Japan	0–0	Western Armenia	Colston Avenue, Carshalton
12:00 BST				Referee: Fehim Dayı

2 June 2018 2018 ConIFA WFC Group D	United Koreans in Japan	0–0	Kabylie	Larges Lane, Bracknell
14:00 BST				Referee: Leon Dastych

3 June 2018 2018 ConIFA WFC Group D	Panjab	1–1	United Koreans in Japan	Arbour Park, Slough
18:00 BST	Purewal 77' (pen.)		Mun 90+4'	Referee: David Murphy

5 June 2018 2018 ConIFA WFC Placement Round 1	United Koreans in Japan	5–0	Tuvalu	Larges Lane, Bracknell
18:00 BST	Taniyama 18'; Lee 20', 58'; Shin 23'; Mun 83'

7 June 2018 2018 ConIFA WFC Placement Round 2	Abkhazia	2–0	United Koreans in Japan	Hayes Lane, Bromley
12:00 BST

9 June 2018 2018 ConIFA WFC Placement Round 3	Tibet	1–1 (1–4 p)	United Koreans in Japan	St Paul's Sports Ground, Rotherhithe
BST

== Coaching staff ==
=== Managerial history ===
Manager	Period	Played	Won	Drawn	Lost	Win %
(South Korea) Chan Ho-seong	2016	6	2	2	2	33.3
(North Korea) An Yong-hak	2018	6	1	4	1	16.7
Totals		12	3	6	3	25.00

== Players ==
=== Current squad ===
The following players were called up to the squad to face Panjab, Western Armenia and Kabylie at the 2018 ConIFA World Football Cup in London from 31 May to 10 June.

Caps and goals correct as of 1 May 2018, when the squad was announced.

No.	Pos.	Player	Date of birth (age)	Caps	Goals	Club
1	GK	Shim Woo-dae	24 January 1985 (age 41)	0	0	Unattached
18	GK	Lim Hyo-geum	3 May 1996 (age 30)	0	0	(Japan Football Association) Kwansei Gakuin University
19	GK	Shim Woo-dae	24 January 1985 (age 41)	0	0	Unattached
2	DF	An Yong-hak	25 October 1978 (age 48)	0	0	Unattached
3	DF	Kang Yoo-jun	8 May 1998 (age 28)	0	0	(United States Soccer Federation) Monroe Mustangs
5	DF	Hong Yun-guk	11 February 1995 (age 31)	0	0	(Japan Football Association) FC Tokushima
6	DF	Son Min-chol	27 October 1986 (age 40)	0	0	(Football Association of Hong Kong, China) Lee Man FC
13	DF	Kim Sun-ji	5 December 1994 (age 31)	5	0	(Japan Football Association) FC Korea
17	DF	Shin Yong-ki	14 April 1993 (age 33)	11	0	(Japan Football Association) FC Korea
4	MF	Ko Ji-hwang	2 March 1995 (age 31)	0	0	(Japan Football Association) FC Tokushima
7	MF	Lee Tong-jun	25 June 1993 (age 33)	0	0	(Japan Football Association) Arawore Hachikita
8	MF	Choi Gwang-yeon	23 December 1987 (age 38)	0	0	(Japan Football Association) FC Korea
9	MF	Lee Tong-soung	1 March 1999 (age 27)	0	0	(The Football Association) Staines Town
10	MF	Yun Song-i	29 January 1980 (age 46)	0	0	Unattached
12	MF	Ken Tamiyama	29 December 1995 (age 30)	10	0	(Japan Football Association) FC Tokushima
14	MF	Byun Yeong-jang	1 November 1988 (age 38)	0	0	(Japan Football Association) Tokyo United
15	MF	Hong Te-il	24 May 1988 (age 38)	0	0	Unattached
16	MF	Mun Su-hyeon	6 August 1995 (age 31)	0	0	(Japan Football Association) FC Korea
11	FW	Shin Yong-ju	1 January 1996 (age 30)	0	0	(Japan Football Association) FC Korea

=== Notable players ===
- (United Koreans in Japan) Lee Tong-soung - played for Staines Town (England)
- (United Koreans in Japan) An Yong-hak
- (United Koreans in Japan) Son Min-chol
