= 2016 ConIFA World Football Cup =

Tournament details
- Host country: Abkhazia
- Dates: 29 May – 5 June
- Teams: 12
- Venue(s): 2 (in 2 host cities)

Final positions
- Champions: Abkhazia (1st title)
- Runners-up: Panjab
- Third place: Northern Cyprus
- Fourth place: Padania

Tournament statistics
- Matches played: 28
- Goals scored: 115 (4.11 per match)
- Top scorer(s): (Panjab) Amar Purewal (7 goals)

The 2016 ConIFA World Football Cup was the second edition of the ConIFA World Football Cup, an international football tournament for states, minorities, stateless peoples and regions unaffiliated with FIFA organised by ConIFA. The tournament was hosted by the Football Federation of Abkhazia, with the Abkhazia team becoming the first host nation to win the tournament.

== Host selection ==
Following the 2015 ConIFA European Football Cup, in which the teams from Abkhazia and South Ossetia were refused visas by the Hungarian government, ConIFA announced that they had delivered strong objections to what they saw as political interference. As a consequence, in July 2015, ConIFA announced that its executive committee had unanimously voted to award the 2016 World Football Cup to Abkhazia. It stated that, in addition to the quality of the bid, the decision would send out the message that ConIFA would stand by all of its members.

== Hosts ==
Abkhazia

Sukhumi	Gagra
Dinamo Stadium	Daur Akhvlediani Stadium
43.004911°N 41.014472°E	43.2860657°N 40.2606291°E
Capacity:4,300	Capacity:1,500
2016 ConIFA World Football Cup is located in Abkhazia

== Qualification ==
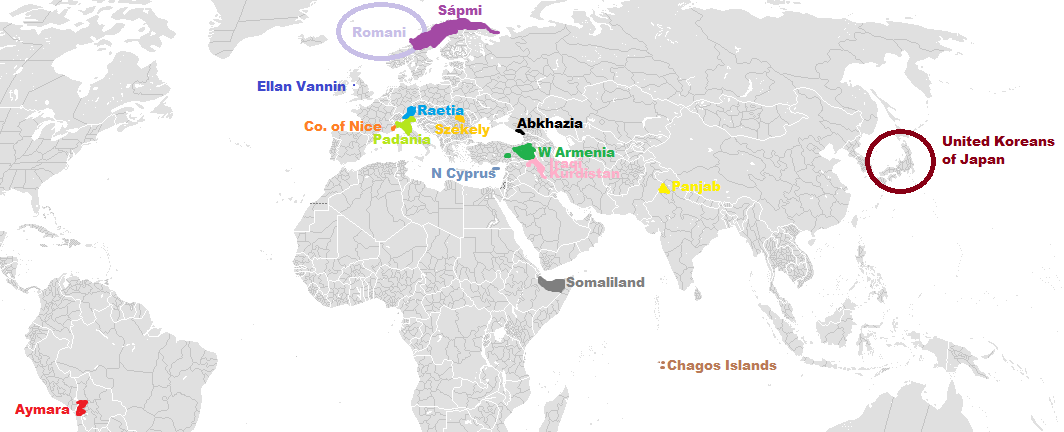
Partial world map showing the national teams that entered the 2016 ConIFA World Football Cup. Note that the Panjab and Chagos teams largely consisted of diaspora members living in England.

The 2016 World Football Cup was the first ConIFA tournament to feature qualification, as the competitors in both the previous tournament and 2015 European Football Cup were invited. The qualification process was designed around a number of different tournaments; initially, ConIFA announced that the top three teams in the 2015 EFC would gain automatic qualification for the 2016 WFC. Subsequent to this decision, ConIFA announced that it would sanction a number of friendly tournaments featuring its members as part of the qualification, with the first of these being the Niamh Challenge Cup, a four team tournament hosted by Ellan Vannin. A further tournament, the Benedikt Fontana Cup was also planned to be hosted by Raetia. The winners of these tournaments would gain qualification to the WFC.

In addition to the hosts, and the teams that gained entry to the tournament through the qualification process, ConIFA extended an invitation to the team representing the Aymara people to become the first South American side to participate.

=== Qualified teams ===
Team	Continent	Method of qualification	Date of qualification	Finals appearance	Previous appearance	Previous best performance	Notes
Aymará	South America	Invitation	13 May 2015	1st	N/A	N/A	Subsequently, withdrew from competition
Ellan Vannin	Europe	Niamh Challenge Cup winners	31 May 2015	2nd	2014	Runners-up (2014)	Subsequently, withdrew from competition
Padania	Europe	European Football Cup Winner	21 June 2015	2nd	2014	5th Place (2014)	Expelled from competition subsequent to qualification; subsequently restored following withdrawal of Romani People
County of Nice	Europe	European Football Cup Runner-up	21 June 2015	2nd	2014	Winners (2014)	Subsequently, withdrew from competition
Abkhazia	Europe	Host	7 July 2015	2nd	2014	8th Place (2014)	
Raetia	Europe	Benedikt Fontana Cup Winners	6 September 2015	1st	N/A	N/A	
Somaliland	Africa	Selected	9 January 2016	1st	N/A	N/A	
Chagos Islands	Africa	Selected	9 January 2016	1st	N/A	N/A	
Kurdistan Region	Asia	Selected	9 January 2016	2nd	2014	6th Place (2014)	
Panjab	Asia	Selected	9 January 2016	1st	N/A	N/A	
United Koreans in Japan	Asia	Selected	9 January 2016	1st	N/A	N/A	
Northern Cyprus	Europe	Selected	9 January 2016	1st	N/A	N/A	
Romani people	Europe	Selected	9 January 2016	1st	N/A	N/A	Subsequently, withdrew from competition
Sápmi	Europe	Selected	9 January 2016	2nd	2014	10th Place (2014)	
Western Armenia	Europe	Selected	9 January 2016	1st	N/A	N/A	
Székely Land	Europe	Selected	2 March 2016	1st	N/A	N/A	Replaced Padania

=== Draw ===
The twelve participating teams were divided into three pots of four for the group stage, which would see them drawn into four groups of three. The draw was made by ConIFA World President Per-Anders Blind in Luleå on 1 April 2016:

Pot 1	Pot 2	Pot 3
Abkhazia; Kurdistan Region; Northern Cyprus; Panjab	Romani people; Sápmi; Chagos Islands; Székely Land	Somaliland; Western Armenia; United Koreans in Japan; Raetia

=== Withdrawals ===
In December 2015, following advice from the UK Foreign and Commonwealth Office over security concerns regarding travel to Abkhazia, the Manx Independent Football Alliance announced that the Ellan Vannin team would withdraw from the World Football Cup, and instead take part in the 2016 Europeada Championship in Italy. Subsequently, both the Aymará team, and County of Nice also withdrew.

In March 2016, ConIFA announced that Padania had been expelled from the tournament due to procedural irregularities, to be replaced by Székely Land.

In May 2016, three weeks prior to the start of the tournament, ConIFA announced that the Romani team had been forced to withdraw from the tournament due to difficulties in obtaining travel documents for their squad. Padania, who had been expelled, were invited to take the place of the Romani team.

== Matches ==
=== Group stage ===
Key to colours in group tables
Team advanced to the quarter-finals
Team in the 9th-12th-place play-offs

==== Group A ====
Team	Pld	W	D	L	GF	GA	GD	Pts
Abkhazia	2	2	0	0	10	0	+10	6
Western Armenia	2	1	0	1	12	1	+11	3
Chagos Islands	2	0	0	2	0	21	−21	0

29 May 2016
20:00 GET

Abkhazia	9–0	Chagos Islands
Kortava 18' (pen.); Argun 19'; Akhba 34'; Prus 39', 43'; Shoniya 47', 57'; Tarba 50'; Pimpia 88'	Report

Dinamo Stadium, Sukhumi

30 May 2016
20:00 GET

Chagos Islands	0–12	Western Armenia
	Report	Ghandilyan 3', 20', 30', 34', 45', 53'; Avolian 55'; Kapikyan 58', 81'; Trapizoyan 64'; Militosyan 69'; Yagan 73'

Dinamo Stadium, Sukhumi

31 May 2016
20:00 GET

Western Armenia	0–1	Abkhazia
		Kortava 9'

Dinamo Stadium, Sukhumi

==== Group B ====
Team	Pld	W	D	L	GF	GA	GD	Pts
Kurdistan Region	2	2	0	0	6	0	+6	6
United Koreans in Japan	2	1	0	1	1	3	−2	3
Székely Land	2	0	0	2	0	4	−4	0

29 May 2016
15:00 GET

Kurdistan Region	3–0	Székely Land
Wriya 34'; Shakor 55'; Ahmed 73'	Report

Dinamo Stadium, Sukhumi

30 May 2016
15:00 GET

United Koreans in Japan	1–0	Székely Land
Son-chon 60'

Dinamo Stadium, Sukhumi

31 May 2016
15:00 GET

United Koreans in Japan	0–3	Kurdistan Region
	Report	Rahman 27'; Khesro 45' (pen.); Ahmad 73'

Dinamo Stadium, Sukhumi

==== Group C ====
Team	Pld	W	D	L	GF	GA	GD	Pts
Northern Cyprus	2	2	0	0	9	1	+8	6
Padania	2	1	0	1	7	2	+5	3
Raetia	2	0	0	2	0	13	−13	0

29 May 2016
11:00 GET

Padania	1–2	Northern Cyprus
Prandelli 48'	Report	Kaya 62'; Turan 67'

Daur Akhvlediani Stadium, Gagra

30 May 2016
11:00 GET

Raetia	0–6	Padania
		Prandelli 23', 35', 54', 61'; Mercorillo 21'; Rota 80'

Daur Akhvlediani Stadium, Gagra

31 May 2016
11:00 GET

Northern Cyprus	7–0	Raetia
Sonay 5', 13', 48'; Eskingen 60'; Sadiklar 73'; Turan 81', 87'

Daur Akhvlediani Stadium, Gagra

==== Group D ====
Team	Pld	W	D	L	GF	GA	GD	Pts
Panjab	2	2	0	0	6	0	+6	6
Sápmi	2	1	0	1	5	1	+4	3
Somaliland	2	0	0	2	0	10	−10	0

29 May 2016
15:00 GET

Sápmi	5–0	Somaliland
Strand 15'; Lahdenmäki 50'; Eriksen 60'; Mannsverk 70'; Yndestad 80'	Report

Daur Akhvlediani Stadium, Gagra

30 May 2016
15:00 GET

Sápmi	0–1	Panjab
	Report	Singh 2'

Daur Akhvlediani Stadium, Gagra

31 May 2016
15:00 GET

Somaliland	0–5	Panjab
		Purewal 30', 67', 80'; Purewal 38'; Singh 74'

Daur Akhvlediani Stadium, Gagra

=== Knockout stage ===
Quarter-finals
1 June – Sukhumi
United Koreans in Japan	1 (2)
Northern Cyprus	1 (4)
1 June – Sukhumi
Abkhazia	2
Sápmi	0
2 June – Sukhumi
Kurdistan Region	2 (6)
Padania	2 (7)
2 June – Sukhumi
Western Armenia	2
Panjab	3

Semi-finals
4 June – Sukhumi
Northern Cyprus	0
Abkhazia	2
4 June – Sukhumi
Padania	0
Panjab	1

Final
5 June – Sukhumi
Abkhazia	1 (6)
Panjab	1 (5)
Third place
5 June – Sukhumi
Padania	0
Northern Cyprus	2

==== Quarter-finals ====
1 June 2016
15:00 GET

United Koreans in Japan	1–1	Northern Cyprus
Song-tae 54'		Kaya 31'
Penalties
Kim Kwang-woo (penalty missed); On Song-tae (penalty scored); Kim Su-yong (penalty scored); An Suug-tae (penalty missed)	2–4	(penalty scored) Esin Sonay; (penalty scored) Halil Turan; (penalty scored) Ünal Kaya; (penalty scored) Ibrahim Çıdamlı

Dinamo Stadium, Sukhumi

1 June 2016
20:00 GET

Abkhazia	2–0	Sápmi
Kortava 35', 73' (pen.)

Dinamo Stadium, Sukhumi

2 June 2016
15:00 GET

Kurdistan Region	2–2	Padania
Prandelli 22' (o.g.); Haji 25'		Ferri 13'; Garavelli 71'
Penalties
Kosrat Baiz (penalty missed); Kamaran Ali (?) (penalty scored); Khalid Mushir (penalty scored); Diyar Rahman (penalty scored); Farhan Shakor (penalty scored); Hunar Ahmad (penalty scored) (?) (penalty scored); Miran Khesro (penalty missed)	6–7	(penalty scored) Matteo Prandelli; (penalty scored) Marco Garavelli; (penalty scored) Alex Mazzocca; (penalty scored) Luca Mosti (?); (penalty missed) Luca Ferri; (penalty scored) Stefano Tignonsini (?); (penalty scored) Gianluca Rolandone (?); (penalty scored) Antonio Pizzolla

Dinamo Stadium, Sukhumi

2 June 2016
20:00 GET

Western Armenia	2–3	Panjab
Avolian 67'; Kaya 79'		Purewal 2', 36', 44'

Dinamo Stadium, Sukhumi

==== Semi-finals ====
4 June 2016
20:00 GET

Northern Cyprus	0–2	Abkhazia
		Logua 9'; Shoniya 69'

Dinamo Stadium, Sukhumi

4 June 2016
15:00 GET

Padania	0–1	Panjab
		Riaz 76'

Dinamo Stadium, Sukhumi

==== Third-Place play-off ====
5 June 2016
15:00 GET

Padania	0–2	Northern Cyprus
		Turan 50'; Ekingen 79'

Dinamo Stadium, Sukhumi

==== Final ====
5 June 2016
20:00 GET

Abkhazia	1–1	Panjab
Shoniya 88'	Report	Purewal 57'
Penalties
Anri Khagba (penalty scored); Anri Khagush (penalty missed); Dmitriy Akhba (penalty missed); Tarash Khagba (penalty scored); Ruslan Shoniya (penalty scored); Alan Khugaev (penalty scored); Shabat Logua (penalty scored); Vladimir Argun (penalty scored)	6–5	(penalty scored) Amar Purewal; (penalty scored) Radjpal Virk; (penalty scored) Terlochan Singh; (penalty missed) Karum Shanker; (penalty missed) Jhai Dhillon; (penalty scored) Aran Basi; (penalty scored) Amarvir Sandhu; (penalty missed) Aaron Minhas

Dinamo Stadium, Sukhumi

ConIFA World Football Cup 2016 winners

Abkhazia
First title

=== Placement Rounds ===
Placement round 1		Placement round 2		Placings	
2 June – Gagra		3 June – Gagra		Sápmi	5th place
Chagos Islands	2	Chagos Islands	3 (2)	Western Armenia	6th Place
Somaliland	3	Raetia	3 (3)	United Koreans in Japan	7th Place
2 June – Gagra		3 June – Gagra		Kurdistan Region	8th Place
Székely Land	7	Somaliland	3	Székely Land	9th place
Raetia	0	Székely Land	10	Somaliland	10th place
3 June – Sukhumi		4 June – Gagra		Raetia	11th place
United Koreans in Japan	1	United Koreans in Japan	1 (4)	Chagos Islands	12th place
Sápmi	2	Kurdistan Region	1 (2)		
3 June – Sukhumi		4 June – Gagra			
Kurdistan Region	0 (5)	Sápmi	3		
Western Armenia	0 (6)	Western Armenia	0		

==== Placement Round 1 ====
2 June 2016
11:00 GET

Chagos Islands	2–3	Somaliland
Goal		Goal

Daur Akhvlediani Stadium, Gagra

2 June 2016
15:00 GET

Székely Land	7–0	Raetia
Goal

Daur Akhvlediani Stadium, Gagra

3 June 2016
15:00 GET

United Koreans in Japan	1–2	Sápmi
Su-yong 2'		? 9' (pen.) ? 61'

Dinamo Stadium, Sukhumi

3 June 2016
20:00 GET

Kurdistan Region	0–0	Western Armenia
Penalties
Miran Khesro (penalty scored); Farhan Shakor (penalty scored); Hunar Ahmad (penalty missed); Farhang Wriya (penalty scored); Diyar Rahman (penalty scored); Aras Mustafa (penalty scored); Znar Faidhi (penalty missed)	5–6	(penalty scored) Hiraç Yagan; (penalty missed) Raffi Kaya; (penalty scored) Tamaz Avolian; (penalty scored) Loris Berberian; (penalty scored) Jules Tepelian; (penalty scored) Herant Yagan; (penalty scored) Denis Oz

Dinamo Stadium, Sukhumi

==== Placement Round 2 ====
3 June 2016
11:00 GET

Chagos Islands	3–3	Raetia
Goal		Kastrie
Penalties
Penalty missed Penalty scored	2–4	Kastrie (penalty scored); Mirco Oswald (penalty scored); Dudler (penalty scored); Tasco (penalty scored)

Daur Akhvlediani Stadium, Gagra

3 June 2016
15:00 GET

Somaliland	3–10	Székely Land
Goal		Goal

Daur Akhvlediani Stadium, Gagra

4 June 2016
11:00 GET

United Koreans in Japan	1–1	Kurdistan Region
Sung-tae 90+5'		? 80'
Penalties
Kim Su-yong (penalty missed); An Suug-tae (penalty scored); Kim Kwang-woo (penalty scored); Huo Yang (penalty scored); Shin Yong-ki (penalty scored)	4–2	Penalty scored Penalty missed

Daur Akhvlediani Stadium, Gagra

4 June 2016
15:00 GET

Sápmi	3–0	Western Armenia
Goal

Daur Akhvlediani Stadium, Gagra

== Final Positions ==
Pos	Team	Pld	W	D	L	GF	GA	GD	Pts	Result
1	Abkhazia	5	4	1	0	15	1	+14	13	
2	Panjab	5	4	1	0	11	3	+8	13	
3	Northern Cyprus	5	3	1	1	12	4	+8	10	
4	Padania	5	1	1	3	9	7	+2	4	
5	Sápmi	5	3	0	2	10	4	+6	9	Eliminated in the Quarterfinals
6	Western Armenia	5	1	1	3	14	7	+7	4	Eliminated in the Quarterfinals
7	United Koreans in Japan	5	1	2	2	4	7	−3	5	Eliminated in the Quarterfinals
8	Kurdistan Region	5	2	3	0	9	3	+6	9	Eliminated in the Quarterfinals
9	Székely Land	4	2	0	2	17	7	+10	6	Eliminated in the First Stage
10	Somaliland	4	1	0	3	6	22	−16	3	Eliminated in the First Stage
11	Raetia	4	0	1	3	3	23	−20	1	Eliminated in the First Stage
12	Chagos Islands	4	0	1	3	5	27	−22	1	Eliminated in the First Stage
