= Abkhazian Cup =

- Founded: 1994
- Region: Abkhazia
- Teams: 10
- Current champions: Nart Sukhum (2025)
- Most championships: Nart Sukhum (12 titles)
- 2020 Abkhazian Cup

The Abkhazian Cup (Russian: Кубок РА) is the foremost association football cup competition in Abkhazia. The tournament is held annually, with football clubs competing from the Abkhazian Premier League and the second division National Abkhazian Football League. The cup competition is not an officially recognized tournament by FIFA or any of its confederations. It is overseen by the Football Federation of Abkhazia.

Winners of the Abkhazian Cup, enter into the Abkhazian Super cup competition where the winners of the Apsny Super League and the winners of the Abkhazian Cup play each other. In 2025 the league winners FC Gagra played Abkhazian Cup winners Nart Sukhum, where FC Gagra[ru] won 3-2.

== List of champions ==
Year	Champions	Scoreboard	Runner-up
1994	Yertsakhu Ochamchira (1)	2-1	FC Dynamo Sukhum
1995	FK Bzyp Bzypta (1)	6-1	FC Duripsh
1996	SKA Dynamo Sukhum (1)	3-3 [3-2 pen]	FC Kiaraz Pitsunda
1997	Yertsakhu Ochamchira (2)	2-1	FC Kiaraz Pitsunda
1998	FC Abazg Sukhum (1)	1-0	Yertsakhu Ochamchira
1999	FC Dinamo Gagra (1)	1-0	Nart Sukhum
2000	FC Abazg Sukhum (2)	2-0	Nart Sukhum
2001	Nart Sukhum (1)	4-1	Yertsakhu Ochamchira
2002	Nart Sukhum (2)	5-0	Ritsa FC
2003	Nart Sukhum (3)	4-0	FC Kiaraz Pitsunda
2004	Kiaraz Pitsunda (1)	6-3	Nart Sukhum
2005	Nart Sukhum (4)	2-0	Ritsa FC
2006	Nart Sukhum (5)	3-0	FC Gagra
2007	Nart Sukhum (6)	2-1	FC Gagra
2008	Nart Sukhum (7)	1-0	FC Gagra
2009	FC Gagra (1)	0-0 [Gagra on pen]	FC Kiaraz Pitsunda
2010	FC Dynamo Sukhum (2)	2-0	FC Gagra
2011	FC Gagra (2)	1-0	Nart Sukhum
2012	FC Gagra (3)	2-1	Nart Sukhum
2013	FC Gagra (4)	1-0	Nart Sukhum
2014	Nart Sukhum (8)	1-1 [6-5 pen]	FC Afon
2015	Ritsa FC (1)	3-1	FC Afon
2016	Nart Sukhum (9)	2-1	FC Gagra
2017	Nart Sukhum (10)	4-1	FC Gagra
2018	FC Gagra (5)	2-2	Nart Sukhum
2019	Nart Sukhum (11)	4-0	Ritsa FC
2020	FC Gagra (6)	2-1	Ritsa FC
2021	FC Gagra (7)	3-2	FC Dynamo Sukhum
2022	Ritsa FC (2)	4-2 [aet]	Nart Sukhum
2023	FC Dynamo Sukhum (3)	5-3 [aet]	FC Afon
2024	Yertsakhu Ochamchira (3)	1-1 [4-2 pen]	FC Dynamo Sukhum
2025	Nart Sukhum (12)	3-0	Bzana Kutol

== See also ==
- Apsny Super League
- Abkhazia Super Cup
- Sport in Abkhazia
