= Sport in Northern Cyprus =

There are 29 sports federations in Northern Cyprus and 13,838 people registered in them as of 2008. Taekwondo-karate-aikido-kurash is the most popular sport with 6054 athletes. It is followed by association football (2240 athletes), shooting (1150 athletes) and hunting (1017 athletes).

Due to the lack of international recognition, Northern Cyprus is not a member of some international sporting bodies.

Some Northern Cyprus sport clubs participate in Turkey's sport leagues. For example: the Fast Break Sport Club, in Turkey's Men's Basketball Regional League; the Beşparmak Sport Club, in Turkey's Handball Premier League; and the Lefka European University, in Turkey's Table-tennis Super League. The international record for swimming 75 km between Turkey and Northern Cyprus belongs to Turkish national Alper Sunaçoğlu (completed in 26 hours and 15 minutes).

== International participation and achievements ==
=== Badminton ===
- Badminton Federation of North Cyprus is an observer member of World Badminton Federation and European Badminton Confederation.

=== Basketball ===
- The men's basketball Super League operates since 1981.
- In May 2015, the national basketball team played two friendly matches against Abkhazia, losing the first one by 59–76 and winning the second one by 59–47. Both matches were played in Northern Cyprus.
- In April 2017, Yakın Doğu Üniversitesi became champions in the FIBA EuroCup Women. Since Northern Cyprus is not a member of FIBA, Northern Cypriot Yakın Doğu Üniversitesi registered in Turkey's basketball league to compete in FIBA Eurocup.

=== Billiards ===
- Billiards Federation of North Cyprus (BFNC) is a member of the European Pocket Billiard Federation (EPBF). The national teams of Cyprus and Northern Cyprus played each other in an international sport tournament for the first time in the 2010 European billiards championships in Kielce, Poland. The country, North Cyprus, is also a member of World Pool-Billiard Association (WPA) and Union Mondial de Billard.
- 2014 Dynamic Billard European Championships (with 32 participating countries) was hosted by Northern Cyprus.

=== Bocce ===
- Bocce Federation of North Cyprus is a member of the International Bocce Association.

=== Bodybuilding ===
- Bodybuilding and Fitness: 2010: Yakup Çavuşgil became World Bodybuilding and Fitness Federation (WBFF) champion in the championship in Canada.

=== Darts ===
- The team of Northern Cyprus Darts Federation became third in darts championship in Spain.

=== EasyKart ===
- EasyKart Federation of North Cyprus is a member of the International EasyKart Federation. 2008: Zeka Özteknik became International Easykart champion in 125cc.

=== Football ===
- In 1975, FIFA general-secretary Helmut Kaser granted permission for Cyprus Turkish Football Federation to play friendly internationals against FIFA countries, but not competitive games; this permission was abolished in 1983 when Northern Cyprus was declared.
- The Turkish Cypriot Football Federation administers a football league in Northern Cyprus.
- Northern Cyprus is among the countries listed by the FIFA Working Committee on Small Nations.
- Northern Cyprus is a member of Confederation of Independent Football Associations (ConIFA).
- In September 2014, Demetris Vasiliou became the first Greek Cypriot football player to sign for a team in the Northern Cypriot league. He plays for Değirmenlik (team of Kythrea). Greek Cypriot nationalists labelled him a "traitor" and surrounded his home, preventing him from attending his first match with the team. Vasiliou said he received death threats. He also lost his job as youth coach of Omonia Aradippou.
- CONIFA Euro 2017 will be hosted by Northern Cyprus.

=== Football Tennis ===
- Football Tennis Association of North Cyprus is a member of the Federation International de Footballtennis Association. Northern Cyprus placed 6th in the 9th World Footballtennis Championship
- The 2011 European FootballTennis Championship was hosted by Northern Cyprus.
- The 2014 World FootballTennis Championship was hosted by Northern Cyprus in 19–24 October.

=== Gymnastics ===
- Turkish Cypriot Gymnastic Federation administers the related activities in the country.

=== Handball ===
- Handball Federation of Northern Cyprus administers a league in the country.

=== Shooting ===
- Shooting: TRNC Shooting Federation participated in Airgun Championships 2011 in Bisley, UK and the team became 2nd.

=== Martial arts ===
- Federation of North Cyprus is a member of Global Taekwon-do Federation (GTF).
- The 9th GTF World Championship in 2013 was hosted by North Cyprus.
- The headquarters of "Eurasia Taekwondo Federations Union" is in Kyrenia of Northern Cyprus.
- Judo, Hapkido and Kickboxing federation of Northern Cyprus became a member of International Sport Kickboxing Association (ISKA) in 2011.
- 14th Euro-Asia Taekwon-Do Championships and First World Budo Martialarts Championships will be organized in Northern Cyprus in 2014.
- Northern Cyprus participated to the World Kickboxing Championship organized by International Sport Kickboxing Association (ISKA) in 2015.

=== Tennis ===
- Eliz Maloney Yorganci from Tennis Federation of Northern Cyprus became champion in the 2014 UK Masters 14U Tennis Tournament.

=== Volleyball ===
- Volleyball Federation of Northern Cyprus administers a league in the country.

=== Wrestling ===
- Northern Cyprus is an associate a member of United World Wrestling, previously known as FILA. The UWW Bureau members raised no objection to the application of Northern Cyprus in 2008.

=== Multi-sport events ===
- On 18 May 2010 Northern Cyprus became a member of the Islamic Solidarity Sports Federation (ISSF).

== Membership of international sports federations ==
Northern Cyprus has gained membership of the following federations:

Entity	Notes	Status	Date
Federation International de Football-Tennis Association (FIFTA)	Northern Cyprus is a full member of FIFTA.	Member	
Futsal European Federation	Northern Cyprus is a member.	Member	
European Pocket Billiard Federation (EPBF)	Northern Cyprus (TNC) is a full member of EPBF.	Member	
United World Wrestling (UWR)	Northern Cyprus is an associate member of UWR.	Associate member	June 2011
World Pool-Billiard Association (WPBF)	Northern Cyprus is a member of the WPBF.	Member	

== See also ==
- Football in Northern Cyprus
