= Luka Bagateliya =

Russian footballer

Personal information
- Full name: Luka Rafaelevich Bagateliya
- Date of birth: 9 June 2004 (age 22)
- Place of birth: Ufa, Russia
- Height: 1.83 m (6 ft 0 in)
- Position: Right winger

Team information
- Current team: Volga Ulyanovsk
- Number: 77

Youth career
- 2019–2020: Ritsa

Senior career*
Years	Team	Apps	(Gls)
2020–2022	Ritsa (CONIFA)		
2023	Dynamo Stavropol	32	(3)
2024–2026	Fakel Voronezh	7	(0)
2025	→ Volga Ulyanovsk (loan)	14	(2)
2026	→ Volga Ulyanovsk (loan)	11	(0)
2026–	Volga Ulyanovsk	0	(0)
- * Club domestic league appearances and goals as of 16 May 2026

Luka Rafaelevich Bagateliya (Russian: Лука Рафаэлевич Багателия; born 29 June 2004) is a Russian football player who plays as a right winger for Volga Ulyanovsk.

== Career ==
On 29 January 2024, Bagateliya signed a long-term contract with the Russian Premier League club Fakel Voronezh.

He made his RPL debut for Fakel on 7 April 2024 in a game against CSKA Moscow. On 4 December 2024, Bagateliya was loaned to Volga Ulyanovsk. He moved to Volga on a permanent basis on 26 June 2026.

== Career statistics ==
As of 1 October 2024

Club	Season	League			Cup		Continental		Total	
Club	Season	Division	Apps	Goals	Apps	Goals	Apps	Goals	Apps	Goals
Dynamo Stavropol	2022–23	Russian Second League	13	2	–		–		13	2
Dynamo Stavropol	2023	Russian Second League B	19	1	2	0	–		21	1
Dynamo Stavropol	Total		32	3	2	0	0	0	34	3
Fakel Voronezh	2023–24	Russian Premier League	3	0	–		–		3	0
Fakel Voronezh	2024–25	Russian Premier League	0	0	5	0	–		5	0
Fakel Voronezh	Total		3	0	5	0	–		8	0
Career total			35	3	7	0	0	0	42	3
