= Gurjit Singh =

Gurjit Singh may refer to:

- Tiger Ali Singh (Gurjit Singh, born 1971), Indo-Canadian professional wrestler
- Gurjit Singh (ambassador), Indian civil servant and ambassador to Germany
- Gurjit Singh (football manager), Fijian football manager
