= Irakli Kortua =

Georgian footballer

Personal information
- Full name: Irakli Kortua
- Date of birth: 5 October 1987 (age 39)
- Place of birth: Soviet Union
- Height: 1.90 m (6 ft 3 in)
- Position: Defender

Team information
- Current team: SK Blāzma

Senior career*
Years	Team	Apps	(Gls)
–2004	FC Gagra	?	(?)
2005–2006	Dynamo Kyiv	0	(0)
2005–2006	FC Dynamo-2 Kyiv	14	(0)
2006–2008	SK Blāzma		
2009–?	Dinaburg FC		
2012	FC Dinamo Sokhumi		
- * Club domestic league appearances and goals

Irakli Kortua (born 5 October 1987) is a Georgian football player, currently playing under for SK Blāzma.
