= Gennadi Bondaruk =

Russian footballer

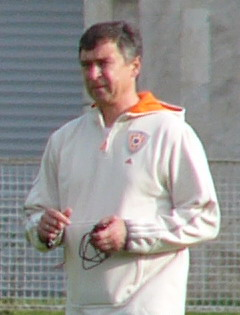
- Gennadi Bondaruk in 2009

Personal information
- Full name: Gennadi Mikhailovich Bondaruk
- Date of birth: 1 July 1965 (age 61)
- Place of birth: Brest, Belarus
- Height: 1.81 m (5 ft 11 1/2 in)
- Positions: Defender; midfielder

Senior career*
Years	Team	Apps	(Gls)
1982–1983	FC Atommash Volgodonsk	26	(0)
1985	FC Torpedo Taganrog	21	(2)
1986–1987	FC Dinamo Gagra		
1987–1988	FC Guria Lanchkhuti	43	(0)
1989–1990	FC Dinamo Sukhumi	33	(2)
1991–1993	FC Zhemchuzhina Sochi	95	(9)
1993	FC Torpedo Adler	1	(0)
1994–1999	FC Zhemchuzhina Sochi	152	(5)
2000–2001	FC Neftekhimik Nizhnekamsk	37	(1)

Managerial career
- 2003: FC Zhemchuzhina Sochi (assistant)
- 2003: FC Zhemchuzhina Sochi (caretaker)
- 2008–2009: FC Zhemchuzhina Sochi (assistant)
- 2012: FC Dynamo Barnaul
- 2013–2014: FC Rus Saint Petersburg
- 2014: FC Saturn Ramenskoye (assistant)
- 2015–2016: FC Angusht Nazran
- 2016: FC Sochi
- 2018–2020: FC Leningradets Leningrad Oblast
- 2020–2021: FC Leningradets Leningrad Oblast (assistant)
- 2021: FC Leningradets Leningrad Oblast
- 2022: FC Veles Moscow (assistant)
- 2022–2023: FC SKA Rostov-on-Don
- * Club domestic league appearances and goals

Gennadi Mikhailovich Bondaruk (Russian: Геннадий Михайлович Бондарук; born 1 July 1965) is a Russian professional football coach and a former player. He also holds Georgian citizenship.

== Playing career ==
He made his professional debut in the Soviet Second League in 1982 for FC Atommash Volgodonsk.
