= Son Min-chol =

Japanese-born North Korean footballer

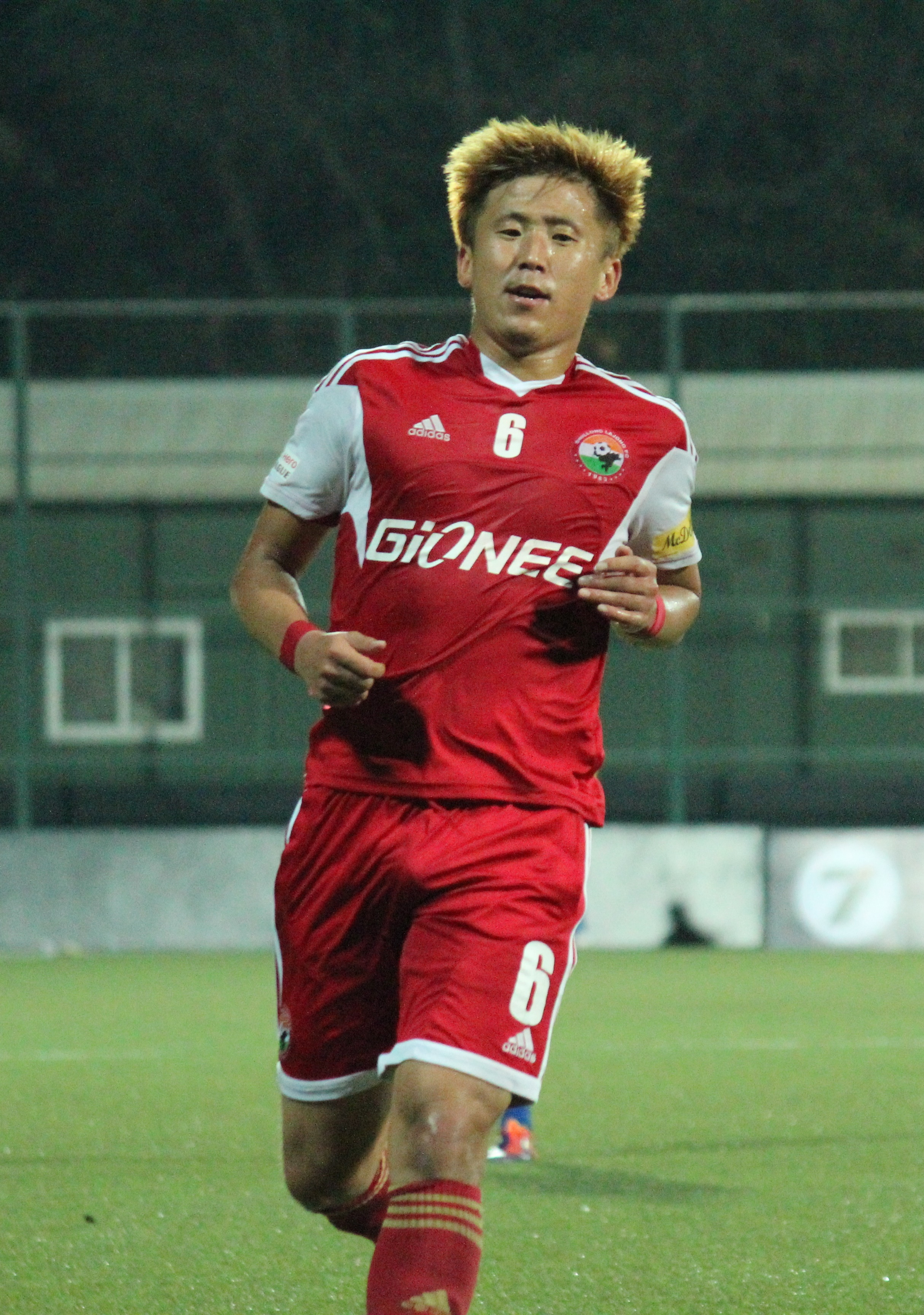

Personal information
- Full name: Minchol Son
- Date of birth: 27 October 1986 (age 40)
- Place of birth: Kyoto, Japan
- Height: 1.84 m (6 ft 0 in)
- Position: Centre back

Senior career*
Years	Team	Apps	(Gls)
2009–2010	Ryūkyū	21	(0)
2010–2012	F.C. Korea	60	(5)
2012–2015	Shillong Lajong	61	(1)
2015–2016	Mumbai	12	(2)
2017	Songkhla United	0	(0)
2017–2018	Lee Man	17	(0)

International career
2007	North Korea U23	4	(0)
2018	United Koreans in Japan	1	(0)
- * Club domestic league appearances and goals as of 31 May 2018

Son Min-chol (Korean: 손민철/孫民哲; born 27 October 1986) is a former professional footballer. Born in Japan, he represented North Korea at the youth level internationally.

== Career ==
=== Japan ===
He played for F.C. Ryūkyū in the Japan Football League, and later the Japanese Regional Leagues side FC Korea.

=== India ===
On 9 June it was announced that he had signed a contract with I-League side Shillong Laong. On 6 October he made his I-League debut against Mohun Bagan. On 17 April 2013, his header gave his side a lead against Mumbai, to help his side register a 2–0 win. Minchol was also captain of the Shillong Lajong squad for the 2013–14 season where the club finished at its highest ever standing.

In 2015, he moved to another I-League club Mumbai.

=== Hong Kong ===
On 4 August 2017, Son was announced as a player for Hong Kong Premier League club Lee Man.

== International career ==
Son was called up to the North Korean squad in June 2014. In 2018, Son received a call-up from the United Koreans in Japan squad ahead of the 2018 ConIFA World Football Cup.

== Personal life ==
Minchol is a North Korean born in Japan. He studied at Korea University.
