= Daur Akhvlediani Stadium =

Stadium in Abkhazia

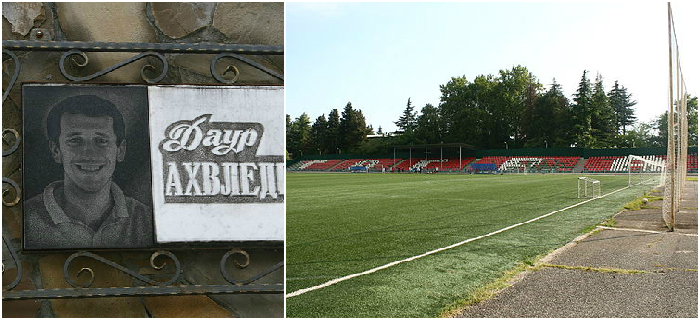
- Interactive map of Daur Akhvlediani Stadium
- Location: Gagra, Abkhazia, Georgia
- Coordinates: 43°17′09″N 40°15′46″E

Construction
- Renovated: 2007

Daur Akhvlediani Stadium is the central stadium of Gagra city in Georgia. It is located on Nartaa Avenue. During the Abkhaz–Georgian conflict the stadium was seriously damaged and ceased to function. In 2007, it was reconstructed and 1,500 plastic benches were installed and drainage works carried out on the football field. The stadium was reopened on July 10, 1997, and was named after the hero of Abkhazia, Daur Akhvlediani.

== 2016 ConIFA World Football Cup ==
During the 2016 ConIFA World Football Cup the Daur Akhvlediani Stadium hosted 12 games, 6 group stage games and 6 of the 8 placement games, as one of the 2 venues for the tournament, the other being the Dinamo Stadium in Sukhumi.
