= Ryūkyū national football team =

Association football team

Ryūkyū
- Association: Ryūkyū Football Association
- Confederation: ConIFA
- Home stadium: Gosamaru Field, Nakagusuku
First colours

First international
- Ryūkyū 0–9 United Koreans in Japan (Nakagusuku; 26 November 2016)

Biggest defeat
- Ryūkyū 0–9 United Koreans in Japan (Nakagusuku; 26 November 2016)
- Website: https://rfa.ryukyu/ https://plusninetask.wixsite.com/ryukyu

The Ryūkyū national football team is a team representing the Ryukyuan people of the Ryukyu Islands, an archipelago under Japanese rule. It is not affiliated with FIFA or the AFC, and therefore cannot compete for the FIFA World Cup or the AFC Asian Cup.

== Ryūkyū Football Association ==
The Ryūkyū Football Association is the football association of Ryukyu. It was founded in Okinawa City in 2014.

== History ==
They competed in the 2018 CONIFA World Football Cup qualification, losing 9–0 to the United Koreans in Japan.
