= Georgy Grammatikopulo =

Soviet footballer

Personal information
- Full name: Georgy Savvich Grammatikopulo
- Date of birth: 1930
- Place of birth: Sukhumi, USSR
- Date of death: 1992 (aged 61–62)
- Position: Striker

Senior career*
Years	Team	Apps	(Gls)
1949–1950	FC Dinamo Tbilisi	21	(0)
1951	Spartak Tbilisi	3	(0)
1952–1953	Dynamo Leningrad	29	(5)
1954–1959	Dynamo Kiev	97	(21)
1960	FC Dinamo Tbilisi	7	(0)
1961–1962	FC Dinamo Sokhumi	53	(8)

International career
1956	Ukraine	2	(0)
- * Club domestic league appearances and goals

Georgy Savvich Grammatikopulo (Russian: Георгий Саввич Грамматикопуло; 1930, Sukhumi – 1992) was a Soviet football player. A native of Sukhumi, Georgia, Grammatikopulo played as a striker.

He started his professional football career at FC Dinamo Tbilisi during the 1949 season. He then joined Spartak Tbilisi, however, after he only had three appearances during the whole season, he joined Dynamo Leningrad in 1952. In the 1954 season, Grammatikopulo was hired by Dynamo Kiev, where he spent the next five years. After a short return to Dinamo Tbilisi in 1960, he joined FC Dinamo Sokhumi in his hometown of Sukhumi. He retired in 1962.

In 1956 Voinov played couple of games for Ukraine at the Spartakiad of the Peoples of the USSR.

In 1992, after the dissolution of the Soviet Union, Grammatikopulo died.
