= Daur Akhvlediani =

Abkhaz footballer

Personal information
- Date of birth: 10 October 1964
- Place of birth: Gagra, Georgian SSR, Soviet Union
- Date of death: 22 September 1993 (aged 28)
- Place of death: Sokhumi
- Position: Defender

Senior career*
| Years | Team | Apps | (Gls) |
| 1983 | FC Torpedo Kutaisi | 2 | (0) |
| 1984–1991 | FC Dinamo Sukhumi | 221 | (7) |
| 1991–1993 | Uralan Elista | 28 | (0) |
- * Club domestic league appearances and goals

Daur Akhvlediani (Georgian: დაურ ახვლედიანი, Russian: Даур Ахвледиани; 10 October 1964 – 22 September 1993) was an Abkhaz professional football player. He took part in the War in Abkhazia (1992–93), subsequently died and was posthumously awarded the order Hero of Abkhazia, the highest honorary title of the disputed territory of Abkhazia.

== Life and career ==
Daur Akhvlediani was born in a Georgian family in Gagra, Abkhazia, which at that time was part of the Soviet Union. He started as a professional footballer in 1983, being drafted by FC Torpedo Kutaisi. The following year, he joined FC Dinamo Sukhumi, at that time playing in the Soviet Second League. He stayed at Dinamo until 1991 and became a permanent member of the regular team. In 1989, Dinamo was finally relegated to the Soviet First League (second highest league). After the dissolution of the Soviet Union and its football leagues, Akhvlediani joined Russian club Uralan Elista. In 1993, he left his club to take part in the Abkhaz-Georgian conflict on the separatist side. He was killed the same year, shortly before fighting ended.

He was posthumously awarded the order Hero of Abkhazia by the de facto government. In his hometown of Gagra, the Daur Akhvlediani Stadium is named after him.
