= Sport in Georgia (country) =

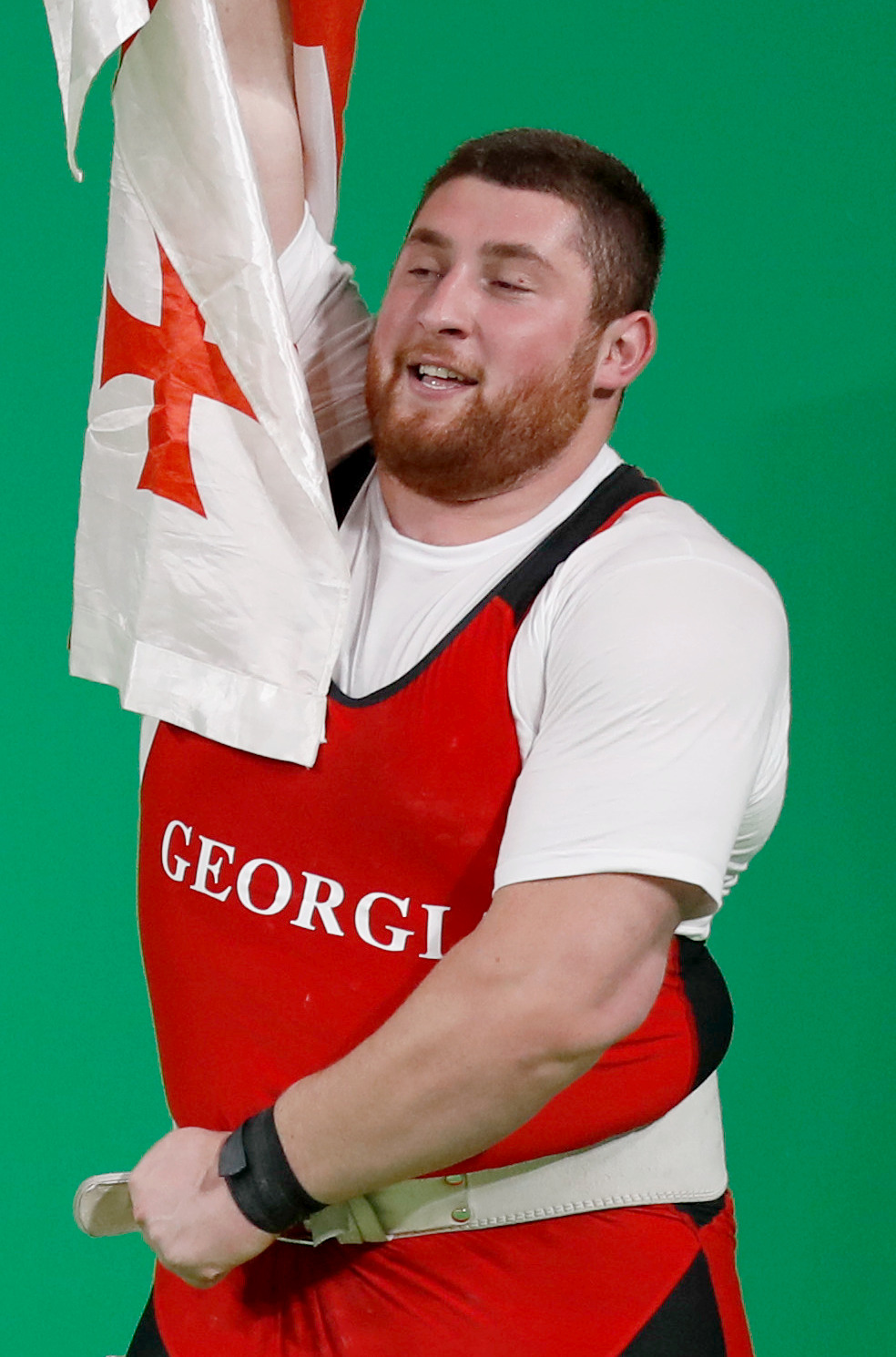
Lasha Talakhadze set several world records in weightlifting

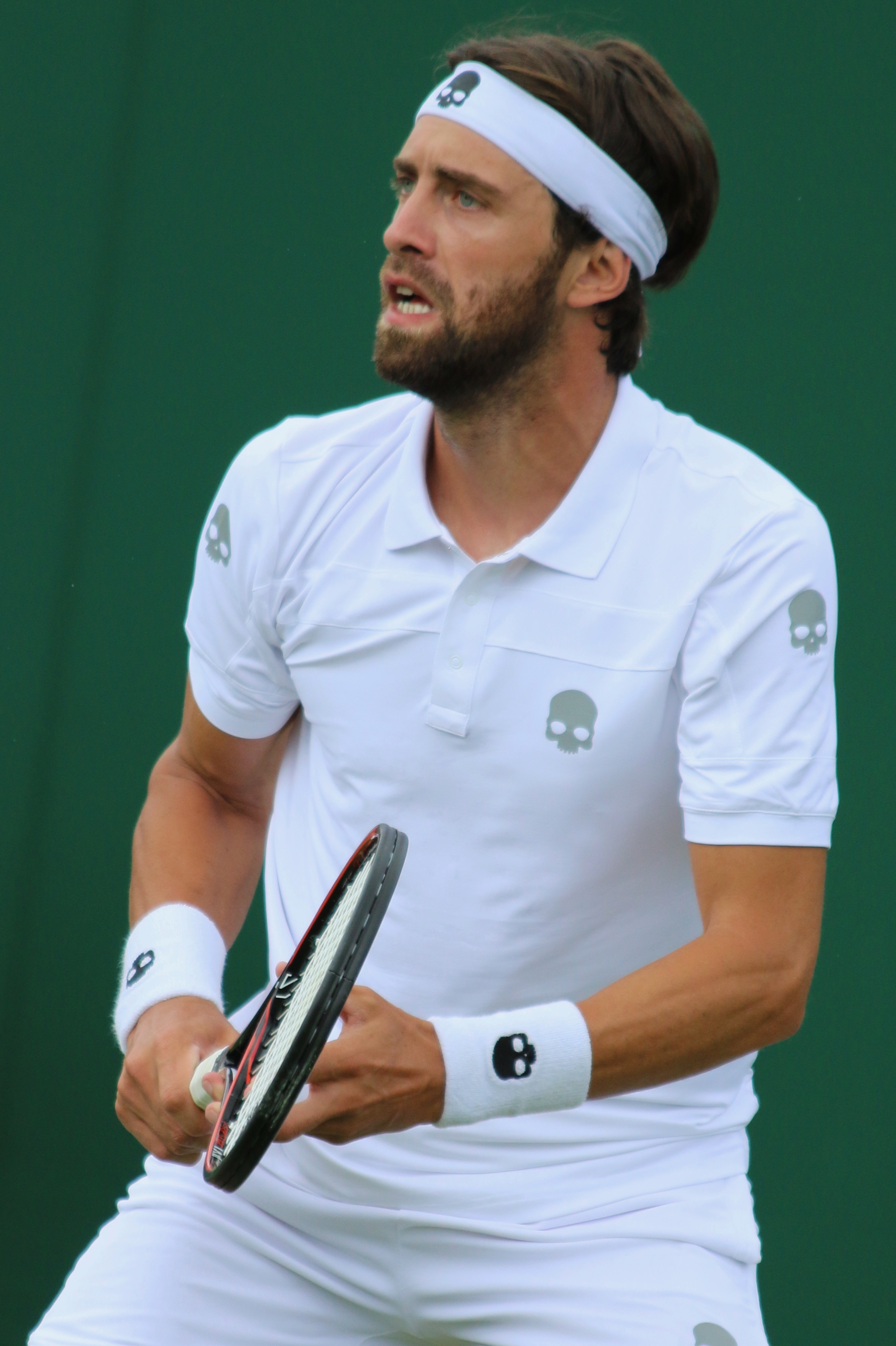
Nikoloz Basilashvili, the top ranked Georgian tennis player

Sport in Georgia has a long history. The most popular sports include football, rugby union, basketball, wrestling, judo and weightlifting. In 19th-century Georgia, polo and the traditional Georgian game lelo were popular, later replaced by rugby union.

== Weightlifting ==
Weightlifting is a sport athletes compete in lifting a barbell with weight plates from the ground to overhead, with each athlete vying to successfully lift the heaviest weights. (information is copied from this link weightlifting )

== Football ==
Football is one of the most popular sports in Georgia. It is governed by the Georgian Football Federation (GFF). The GFF organizes the men's, women's, and futsal national teams. Modern football was introduced by English sailors playing in Poti at the beginning of the 20th century. In 2029, Georgia will host the FIFA U-20 World Cup along with Armenia, marking the first time the country has hosted a FIFA tournament.

== Rugby union ==
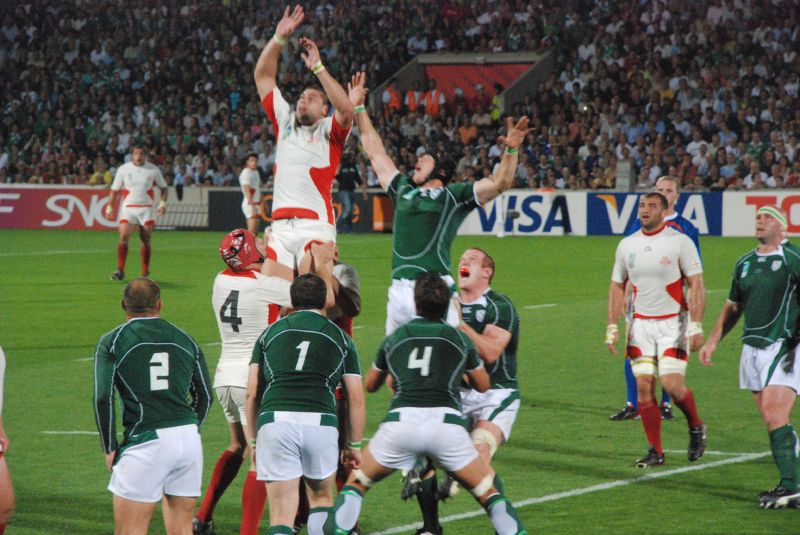
Ireland playing Georgia at the 2007 Rugby World Cup.

Rugby union is the most popular sport in the country. They have qualified in every single Rugby World Cup since 2003, their best result being winning two games at pool stage in the Rugby World Cup 2015. Their national team is considered to be Tier 2 with high performance.

== Wrestling ==
Wrestling remains a historically important sport. Some historians claim that the Greco-Roman style of wrestling incorporates many Georgian elements. Within Georgia, one of the most popularized styles of wrestling is the Kakhetian style. However, other styles are not as widely used today. For example, the Khevsureti region of Georgia has three different styles of wrestling.

== Lelo burti ==
Lelo, or lelo burti (Georgian: ლელო ბურთი), literally a "field ball [playing]", is a Georgian folk sport. It is a full contact ball game, similar to rugby. Within Georgian rugby union terminology, the word lelo is used to mean a try, and the popularity of rugby union in Georgia has been attributed to it.

In 2014, lelo burti, along with khridoli, a traditional martial art, was inscribed by the government of Georgia as a "nonmaterial monument" of culture.

It appeared in the 12th century Georgian epic poem "The Knight in the Panther's Skin" in which the characters play lelo burti.

== Basketball ==
Georgia has produced world-class basketball players including Tornike Shengelia, Vladimir Stepania, Nikoloz Tskitishvili and most notably Zaza Pachulia. Georgians strongly support their national team. Mikheil Saakashvili, former president of the country, travelled to Lithuania to support his team at the 2011 EuroBasket with 1,500 fans from Georgia.

Georgia co-hosted EuroBasket 2021 in Tbilisi alongside Czech Republic, Germany and Italy.

Georgia made their debut at the FIBA Basketball World Cup in 2023 where they finished 16th.

Tornike Shengelia is playing in Euroleague, they had wins against Serbia, Lithuania and Greece.

As of February 2024, Georgia's men ranked 23rd in the world.

== Motorsport ==
The only race circuit in the Caucasian region is located in Georgia. Rustavi International Motorpark was originally built in 1978 and re-opened in 2012 after reconstruction costing $20 million. The track satisfies FIA Grade 2 requirements and currently hosts the Legends car racing series and Formula Alfa competitions.

== Golf ==
In recent years, several golf courses have also opened in Georgia, with the 18-hole Tbilisi Hills golf course joined by the Paragraph Tabori Golf & Spa Resort in 2025. Paragraph Tabori is partnered with global golf specialists, IMG, and is also home to a driving range, golf academy, and indoor studios to encourage new golfers in Georgia to take up the sport.

== Winter sports ==
=== Luge ===
Nodar Kumaritashvili (Georgian: ნოდარ ქუმარიტაშვილი; 25 November 1988 – 12 February 2010) suffered a fatal crash during a training run prior to the 2010 Winter Olympics competition in Vancouver, Canada. He was the fourth athlete to die during Winter Olympics preparations in history, and the first in 18 years. The opening ceremonies of the Games, led by IOC President Jacques Rogge, which took place later on the fateful day, were dedicated to the 21-year-old.

== See also ==
- Ministry of Sport & Youth Affairs of Georgia
- Sport in Abkhazia
