= Northern Cyprus national basketball team =

Northern Cyprus
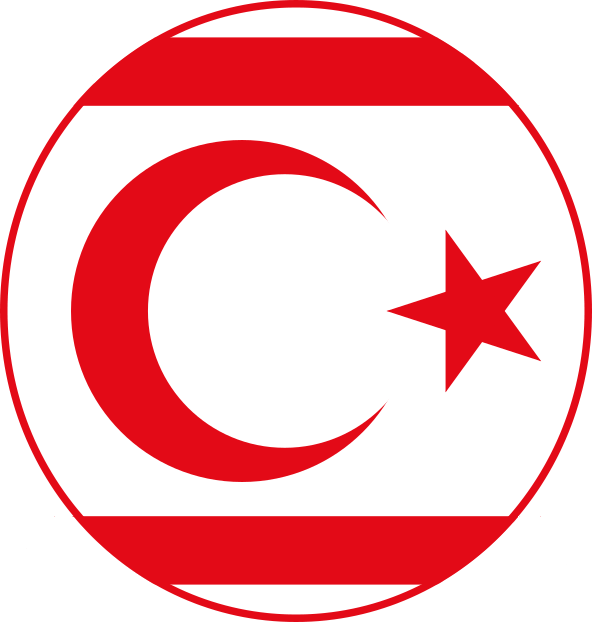
- National federation: Turkish Republic of Northern Cyprus Basketball Federation
Home	Away

First international
- Northern Cyprus 84–78 Kyrgyzstan (Kyrenia, Northern Cyprus; 24 January 2006)

Biggest win
- Northern Cyprus 78–62 Kyrgyzstan (North Nicosia, Northern Cyprus; 19 July 2021)

Biggest defeat
- Northern Cyprus 59–76 Abkhazia (Kyrenia, Northern Cyprus; 27 May 2015)

The Northern Cyprus national basketball team is the basketball team of Northern Cyprus. The team is not affiliated to FIBA, so only plays friendly games.

== History ==
Northern Cyprus's first match was played on 25 January 2006, against Kyrgyzstan. The team won by 84–78.

In May 2015, the team played two matches against Abkhazia national team in Northern Cyprus, invited by the TRNC Federation. The team won their second match by 59–47, while the third match was cancelled.

In 2021, the team played two friendly matches against Kyrgyzstan. Northern Cyprus won the first of them.

== Matches ==
24 January 2006	Northern Cyprus	84–78	Kyrgyzstan	(Northern Cyprus) Kyrenia
		Boxscore		Arena: Ertuğrul Apakan Kapalı Spor Salonu

26 January 2006	Northern Cyprus	vs.	Kyrgyzstan	(Northern Cyprus) North Nicosia
				Arena: Atatürk Spor Salonu

25 May 2015	Northern Cyprus	59–76	Abkhazia	(Northern Cyprus) Kyrenia
		Boxscore		Arena: Ertuğrul Apakan Kapalı Spor Salonu

29 May 2015	Northern Cyprus	59–47	Abkhazia	(Northern Cyprus) North Nicosia
		Boxscore		Arena: Atatürk Spor Salonu

19 July 2021	Northern Cyprus	78–62	Kyrgyzstan	(Northern Cyprus) North Nicosia
		Boxscore		Arena: Atatürk Spor Salonu

21 July 2021	Northern Cyprus	80–83	Kyrgyzstan	(Northern Cyprus) North Nicosia
		Boxscore		Arena: Atatürk Spor Salonu

== See also ==
- Sport in Northern Cyprus
