= Miran Khesro =

Iraqi Kurdistan footballer

Miran Khasro
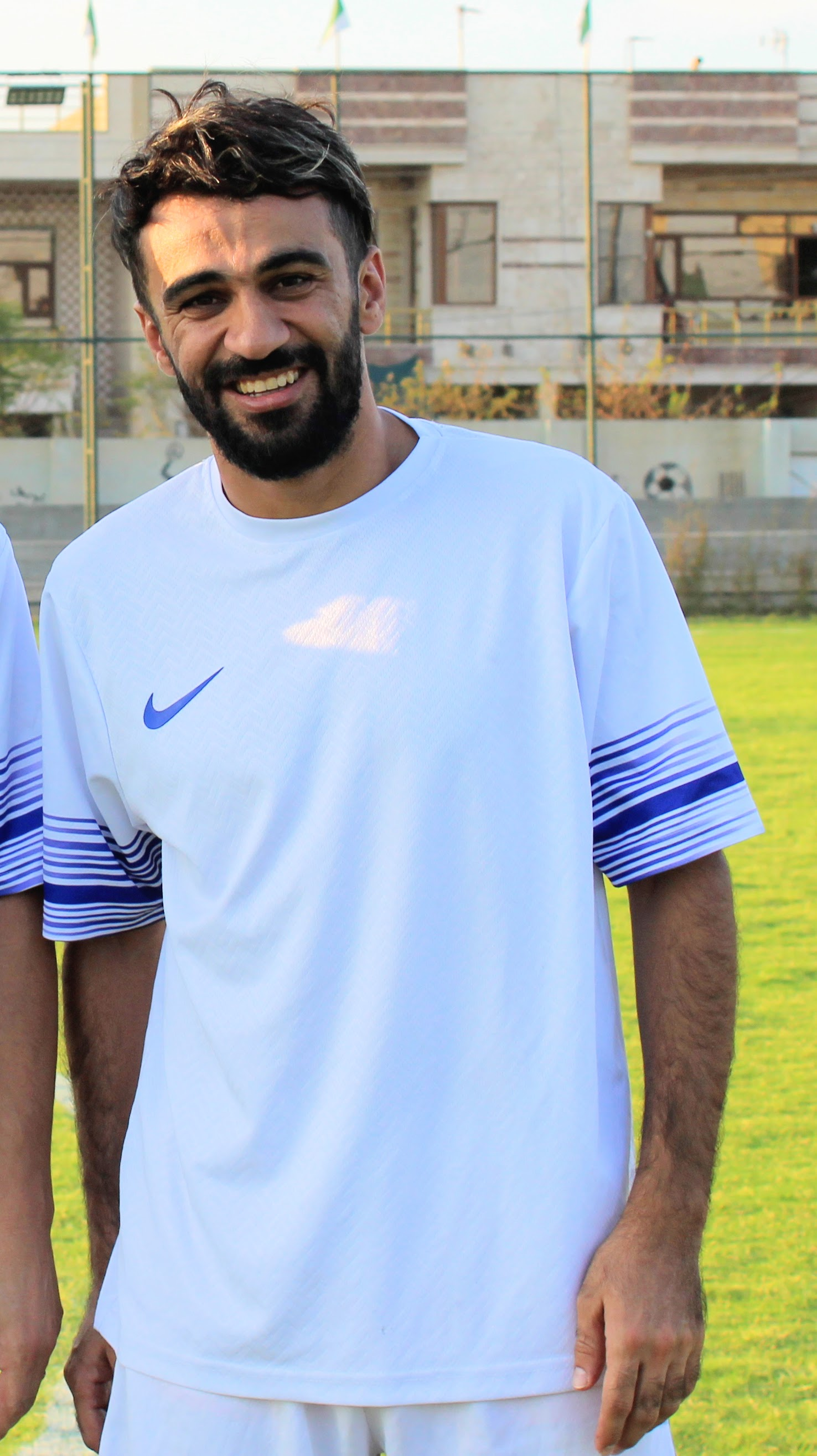
- Miran in 2021

Personal information
- Full name: Miran khasro Salim
- Date of birth: 1 July 1989 (age 37)
- Place of birth: Erbil, Iraqi Kurdistan
- Height: 1.70 m (5 ft 7 in)
- Position: Midfielder

Team information
- Current team: Al Shamal
- Number: 26

Youth career
- 2004–2007: Erbil SC

Senior career*
Years	Team	Apps	(Gls)
2007–2016	Erbil SC	176	(10)
2016–2017	Al Shorta SC		
2017–2018	Zakho FC		
2018–2019	Al Shamal		
2019	Sohar		

International career
2010–2016	Iraqi Kurdistan	11	(1)
2016–	Iraq	2	(0)
- * Club domestic league appearances and goals

Miran Khesro (Kurdish: میران خەسرۆ, born 1989) is an Iraqi Kurdistan football player who currently plays as a midfielder for Sohar.

== Honours ==
- Iraqi Premier League:

Champions (3): 2007–08, 2008–09 and 2011–12.
Runner-up (2): 2010–11, 2012–13
