= 2019 Abkhazian Premier League =

2020 Abkhazian Premier League (Victory Cup)

Tournament details
- Country: Abkhazia
- Dates: October 10, 2019 - November 18, 2019
- Teams: 4

Final positions
- Champions: Ritsa FC
- Runners-up: FC Gagra

Tournament statistics
- Matches played: 13
- Goals scored: 40 (3.08 per match)
- Top goal scorer(s): Marat Agrba (Ritsa FC) - 7 goals

The 2019 Abkhazian Premier League was canceled as there were only four teams registered. For this reason, the Football Federation of Abkhazia created the Victory Cup, to replace this edition of the Abkhazian Premier League.

== Participating teams ==
This edition of the competition was attended by 4 teams:

- Ritsa FC,
- FC Gagra,
- Narth Aqwa,
- Dinamo Aqwa.

== Victory Cup 2019 ==
=== Round 1 ===
[Oct 10] FC Gagra 2-0 Dinamo Aqwa

[Oct 11] Ritsa FC 9-1 Narth

=== Round 2 ===
[Oct 17] Ritsa FC 3-1 Dinamo Aqwa

[Oct 18] FC Gagra 0-1 Narth

=== Round 3 ===
[Oct 24] Narth 4-0 Dinamo Aqwa

[Oct 25] Ritsa FC 1-0 FC Gagra

=== Round 4 ===
[Oct 31] Dinamo Aqwa - FC Gagra

[Nov 1] Narth 3-3 Ritsa FC

=== Round 5 ===
[Nov 7] Dinamo Aqwa 1-3 Ritsa FC

[Nov 8] Narth - FC Gagra

=== Round 6 ===
[Nov 14] Dinamo Aqwa 2-0 Narth

[Nov 15] FC Gagra 4-1 Ritsa FC

=== Final ===
[Nov 18, Aqwa, Dinamo Stadium]

Ritsa FC 1-0 FC Gagra (T.Gublia 90+3)

==== Top Scorer ====
- Marat Agrba (Ritsa FC) - 7 goals
