= FC Korea =

Japanese football club

- Full name: Football Club Korea
- Founded: 1961; 65 years ago
- Ground: Akabane Park Stadium; Akabane, Kita-ku, Tokyo
- Chairman: Lee Cheong-Gyeong
- Manager: Yoon Se-ji
- League: Tokyo League Division 2
- Website: fc-korea.com
Home colours	Away colours

FC Korea (Japanese: Efu Shi Koria) is a Japanese football club playing in the Tokyo League Division 2, the eighth tier of Japanese football.

== History ==
The club was founded in 1961 as Zainichi Chosen Football Club. Initially it maintained links with Chongryon, the pro-North Korea organisation of Koreans in Japan, and recruited talent through the Korea University sports program.

Following the admission of the abductions of Japanese people by North Korean Leader Kim Jong-il in 2002, however, the club severed links with Chongryon and adopted the name Football Club Korea, using the English pronunciation of the name of the peninsula (see Names of Korea). The club adopted a pan-Korean identity in order to attract players affiliated with the South.

In 2008 FC Korea was promoted to the Kanto League Second Division and in 2010 they were promoted to the First Division, where they stayed until 2016 when they were relegated. By 2019 they were back in the Tokyo Metropolis League Second Division, where they remain.

=== Zainichi Koreans international side ===
In 2015, the United Korean Football Association in Japan (UKFAJ), an organisation intended to promote the participation of the Korean diaspora in football on a wider basis, was founded, with a view to the formation of a dedicated Zainichi football team. This was achieved in November 2015, when the UKFAJ joined ConIFA, an organisation designed to facilitate teams that represent unrecognised nations, sub-national entities and stateless peoples in playing international football. The team representing the Zainichi people is based primarily around the FC Korea team. This team was subsequently selected as one of the twelve qualifiers for the 2016 ConIFA World Football Cup where it came in eighth place.

== Current squad ==
Squad for the 2022 season. Updated as of 23 March 2022.

Note: Flags indicate national team as defined under FIFA eligibility rules; some limited exceptions apply. Players may hold more than one non-FIFA nationality.

No.	Pos.	Nation	Player
1	GK	KOR	Lee Young-jin
3	DF	KOR	Shin Yong-gi
4	MF	JPN	Kyo Akitoshi
5	MF	KOR	Jang So-joo
6	MF	KOR	Moon Soo-hyun
7	MF	KOR	Koo Jee-hwang
8	MF	KOR	Kim Seung-ho
9	FW	KOR	Kim Shin-ho
10	FW	KOR	Choi Hyeon-kyu
11	MF	KOR	Kim Tae-soo

No.	Pos.	Nation	Player
12	GK	KOR	Shin Yoo-young
13	DF	KOR	Kim Seung-ji
14	MF	KOR	Lee Dong-joon
16	DF	KOR	Hwang Se-ho
17	DF	KOR	Choi Hwi-jeong
18	MF	KOR	Shin Young-ju
19	GK	KOR	Cho Tae-il
20	DF	KOR	Jeong Hwang-lee
21	MF	KOR	Park Se-hun
23	FW	KOR	Kim Heong-young

== Honours ==
FC Korea Honours
Honour	No.	Years
Tokyo Metropolitan Government Section 1	1	2007
All Japan Adult Football Championship	1	2012
Kanto Soccer League Division 1	1	2013
Tokyo Metropolitan Government 2nd Section	1	2024
