= Shabat Logua =

Russian footballer

Personal information
- Full name: Shabat Daurovich Logua
- Date of birth: 22 March 1995 (age 31)
- Place of birth: Sokhumi, Abkhazia, Georgia
- Height: 1.74 m (5 ft 9 in)
- Positions: Forward; midfielder

Youth career
- 2010–2012: Tolyatti
- 2013: Konoplyov academy
- 2014: Lada-Tolyatti

Senior career*
Years	Team	Apps	(Gls)
2014	Sochi	0	(0)
2015–2016	Nart Sukhum		
2016–2017	Lefke T.S.K.	15	(2)
2018–2019	Nart Sukhum		
2019	Tyumen	8	(0)
2020	OFK Bačka	4	(0)
2021	Zlatibor Čajetina	3	(0)

International career
	Abkhazia	18	(3)
- * Club domestic league appearances and goals

Shabat Daurovich Logua (born 22 March 1995) is a Russian former professional footballer who played as a midfielder.

== Club career ==
Born in Sokhumi, in Abkhazia, Georgia, he started playing at FC Tolyatti and Konoplyov football academy. He debuted as a senior playing in the Tolyatti reserves team at the fourth level in 2011 and 2012. In 2014, he played with Lada-Tolyatti and the PFC Sochi reserves team.

In 2015, he returned to his birthplace and played with Nart Sokhumi until 2019, except for a season in 2016–17 when he played with Lefke TSK in KTFF Süper Lig from Northern Cyprus.

In the summer 2019, he returned to Russia, where he joined the main team after spending a short time with FC Tyumen. During winter break, he moved abroad to Serbia and joined OFK Bačka, playing in the Serbian First League, where he joined another Abkhazian international, Daur Chanba. Bačka got promoted in the summer of 2020, and Logua stayed in the club, with the difference being also the change of his shirt number from 17 to 7.
