= Abkhazia national basketball team =

Abkhazia
- National federation: Basketball Federation of Abkhazia
- Coach: Konstantin Mazov
Home	Away

First international
- Northern Cyprus 59–76 Abkhazia (Kyrenia, Northern Cyprus; 27 May 2015)

Biggest win
- Northern Cyprus 59–76 Abkhazia (Kyrenia, Northern Cyprus; 27 May 2015)

Biggest defeat
- Northern Cyprus 91–59 Abkhazia (North Nicosia, Northern Cyprus; 15 November 2026)

The Abkhazia national basketball team is the basketball team of Abkhazia, a partially-recognized state located in Georgia. The team is not affiliated to FIBA, so only plays friendly games.

== History ==
Abkhazia's first match was played on 27 May 2015, as part of a tour of the national team in Northern Cyprus, invited by their federation. The team lost their second match by 47–59, while the third match was cancelled.

The team returned to Northern Cyprus in November 2026 to contest the 15 November Republic Cup (Turkish: 15 Kasım Cumhuriyet Kupası). In the match, played at the Atatürk Sports Hall in North Nicosia, Abkhazia lost 59–91 to the hosts, who took the trophy.

== Squad ==
Abkhazia national basketball team roster
Players
Coaches

Pos.	No.	Name	Age – Date of birth	Height	Club	Ctr.
SF		Gudisa Ahba	–	1.90 m (6 ft 3 in)
F		Alyas Kvarandzia	–	1.85 m (6 ft 1 in)
C		Kolya Kuznetsov	–	1.94 m (6 ft 4 in)
SG		Tengiz Avidzba	–	1.85 m (6 ft 1 in)
G		Sandro Harazia	–	1.85 m (6 ft 1 in)
G/F		Georgi Arakelyan	–	1.93 m (6 ft 4 in)
C		Luka Bashnikov	–	1.90 m (6 ft 3 in)
PG		Said Matua	–	1.75 m (5 ft 9 in)
F		Teimuraz Berzenia	–	1.85 m (6 ft 1 in)
SG		Fyodor Shipartsov	–	1.90 m (6 ft 3 in)
G		Dünya Başol	–	2.01 m (6 ft 7 in)
F/C		Dmitry Dzindzholia	–	1.95 m (6 ft 5 in)

Head coach

- (Abkhazia) Konstantin Mazov

Assistant

- (Abkhazia) Nikolai Gushin

== Matches ==
25 May 2015	Northern Cyprus	59–76	Abkhazia	(Northern Cyprus) Kyrenia
		Boxscore

29 May 2015	Northern Cyprus	59–47	Abkhazia	(Northern Cyprus) North Nicosia
		Boxscore

15 November 2026	Northern Cyprus	91–59	Abkhazia	(Northern Cyprus) North Nicosia
		Boxscore		Arena: Atatürk Sports Hall
