= Abkhazian Premier League =

Apsny Super League
- Founded: 1994
- First season: 1994
- Country: (Abkhazia) FFA
- Confederation: CONIFA
- Number of clubs: 9
- Level on pyramid: 1
- Relegation to: National Abkhazian Football League
- Domestic cup(s): Abkhazian Cup; Super Cup
- Current champions: FC Gagra (5th title) (2025)
- Most championships: Nart Sukhum (15 titles)
- Broadcaster: Mooore TV
- Website: https://ff-ra.ru/

The Apsny Super League (Russian: Апсны Суперлига) is the top association football league in Abkhazia. The League plays in a spring-autumn system with a summer break from July to September.

== History ==
The league was founded in 1994 and is not recognized by FIFA or any of its confederations, therefore the winners cannot participate in UEFA/AFC competitions or World Club Cup.

The league is overseen by the Football Federation of Abkhazia. It consists of 9 football clubs and there is a relegation/promotion system between the Abkhazian Premier League and the 12 member Second Division 'National Abkhazian Football League'. With a relegation playoff occurring between the bottom side of the Apsny Super League and the Champion of the National Abkhazian Football League. Premier League clubs compete for the Abkhazian Cup annually, the leagues' domestic cup competition. Which the winners of the Abkhazian Cup and the Super League compete to win the Super Cup.

The League expanded in the 2026 season to include 9 members from the previous 8, due to the promotion of FC Byzb, even though they lost the promotion/relegation playoff with FC Afon 4-2 on penalties.

== Current members (2026) ==
Club	Position in 2025	Top division titles	Last top division title
FC Gagra[ru]	Champions	5	2025
Nart Sukhum	2nd	15	2024
FC Dynamo Sukhum[ru]	3rd	1	1994
FC Yertsakhu Ochamchira	4th	2	1998
Ritsa FC	5th	2	2022
FC Banza Kutol[ru]	6th	0	N/A
FC Sadz Tsandrypsh[ru]	7th	0	N/A
FC Afon[ru]	8th	3	2017
FC Byzb	Promoted	0	N/A

== List of champions ==
Year	Champions	Runners-up	Third place
1994	FC Dynamo Sukhum	Yertsakhu Ochamchira	FC Dinamo Gagra
1995	Football Club Kiaraz Pitsunda	FC Psyrtsha Afon	Yertsakhu Ochamchira
1996	Yertsakhu Ochamchira	Kiaraz Pitsunda	FC Psyrtsha Afon
1997	Football Club Kiaraz Pitsunda	SKA-Dinamo Sukhum FC	FC Bzana Kutol
1998	Football Club Yertsakhu Ochamchira	SKA-Dinamo Sukhum	Nart Sukhum
1999	Nart Sukhum	FC Dinamo Gagra	Yertsakhu Ochamchira
2000	Nart Sukhum	FC Dinamo Gagra	FC Abazg Sukhum
2001	FC Abazg Sukhum	Ritsa FC	Nart Sukhum
2002	Ritsa FC	Nart Sukhum	Yertsakhu Ochamchira
2003	Nart Sukhum	Ritsa FC	FC Dinamo Gagra
2004	Football Club Kiaraz Pitsunda	Nart Sukhum	Ritsa FC
2005	Nart Sukhum	Kiaraz Pitsunda	Ritsa FC
2006	Football Club Gagra	Nart Sukhum	Ritsa FC
2007	Nart Sukhum	FC Gagra	Kiaraz Pitsunda
2008	Nart Sukhum	FC Gagra	FC Leon Ochamchira
2009	Nart Sukhum	FC Gagra	Kiaraz Pitsunda
2010	FC Gagra	Nart Sukhum	FC Dinamo Sukhum
2011	Nart Sukhum	FC Gagra	FC Dinamo Sukhum
2012	FC Gagra	Nart Sukhum	Ritsa FC
2013	Nart Sukhum	FC Afon	FC Abazg Sukhum
2014	FC Afon	FC Gagra	Ritsa FC
2015	FC Afon	Nart Sukhum	Ritsa FC
2016	Nart Sukhum	FC Afon	FC Gagra
2017	FC Afon	FC Gagra	Nart Sukhum
2018	Nart Sukhum	FC Gagra	Ritsa FC
2019	Nart Sukhum	FC Gagra	FC Afon
2020	Nart Sukhum	Ritsa FC	FC Dynamo Sukhum
2021	Nart Sukhum	Ritsa FC	FC Dynamo Sukhum
2022	Ritsa FC	Nart Sukhum	FC Gagra
2023	FC Gagra	Ritsa FC	Nart Sukhum
2024	Nart Sukhum	FC Gagra	Ritsa FC
2025	FC Gagra	Nart Sukhum	FC Dynamo Sukhum

== See also ==
- Sport in Abkhazia
- Abkhazia national football team
