= Gurjit Singh (football manager) =

Fijian professional football manager

Personal information
- Place of birth: Fiji

Managerial career
- Years: Team
- 199x–199x: Tailevu/Naitasiri F.C.
- 200x–2009: Navua F.C.
- 2010–2011: Lautoka F.C.
- 2011: Fiji
- 2012–2013: Suva F.C.

Gurjit Singh is a Fijian professional football manager.

== Career ==
In the 1990s he trained Tailevu/Naitasiri F.C. with the club winning title of best coach of the year in 1994. Until 2009 he worked as manager for the Navua F.C. He coaching Lautoka F.C. for the 2009–10 OFC Champions League. In January 2011 Gurjit Singh became the new coach of Fiji national football team. Later he worked as manager of the Suva F.C.

== Honour ==
- League Championship (for Districts): 1

2014

- Inter-District Championship : 3

2009, 2012, 2014

- Fiji Football Association Cup Tournament: 2

2009, 2012

- Coach of the Year Award: 3

1994, 2012, 2014
