= Football Club Abazg Sukhum =

FC Abazg Sukhum
- Full name: Football Club Abazg Sukhum
- Founded: 1995
- Dissolved: 2017
- Ground: Sukhum, Abkhazia, Georgia
- League: Abkhazian Premier League; Abkhazian Cup; Abkhazia Super Cup
Home colours

Football Club Abazg Sukhum is a football club in the city of Sukhum, in Abkhazia, a breakaway region of Georgia, that competed in the Abkhazian Premier League.

== History ==
Founded on 1995 in the city of Sokhumi in Abkhazia, the club is affiliated with the Football Federation of Abkhazia. The Abazg Sukhum team stopped competing in the Abkhazian Premier league in 2017, but youth teams of Abazg Sukhum continue to compete in youth competitions in Abkhazia and in Russia

== Titles ==
=== Abkhazian Premier League ===
Sources:

- Champions (1)

2001

- Third Place (2)

2000

=== Abkhazian Cup ===
- Champions(2)

1998, 2000

=== Abkhazian Super Cup ===
- Runners-Up (2)

2000, 2001
