= FC Dinamo Gagra =

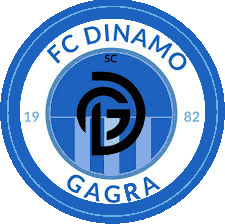
- Full name: Football Club Dinamo Gagra
- Founded: 1982
- Ground: Khvamli Arena, Tbilisi, Georgia
- President: Mamuka Asatiani
- Coach: Kakhaber Kekelidze
- League: Regionuli Liga (Georgia (country))
- 2025: 12th of 16
- Website: Page on Facebook
Home colours	Away colours

FC Dinamo Gagra (Georgian: სკ დინამო გაგრა) is Georgian football club, currently competing in Group A of Regionuli Liga, the 5th tier of Georgian football.

Due to the ongoing Georgian-Abkhazian conflict, the club is based in Tbilisi.

Khvamli Arena, situated in the Nadzaladevi District of Tbilisi, is their home ground.

== History ==
The club was founded in 1982 during the Soviet era as part of the Dinamo sports society. Before the outbreak of the armed conflict in Abkhazia, the team represented the region in local championships and regional tournaments.

The club took part in the inaugurating season of the national Pirveli Liga under the name Sikharuli-90 and finished 6th in a twenty-team league. The next year, they dropped out of the 2nd league following a relegation playoff defeat to Merani Tbilisi on penalties.

Following the 1992–1993 war and the subsequent occupation of Abkhazia, the club's infrastructure was seized, forcing the team into exile. In 1997, Dinamo Gagra resumed functioning in the town of Tskaltubo, where a large refugee settlement existed, and competed in the 3rd division.

Despite the displacement, the club managed to preserve its legal identity and institutional continuity. Since the relocation, Dinamo Gagra has operated out of Tbilisi, heavily relying on the mobilization and support of displaced youths and athletes from the Abkhazian diaspora.

Today, it remains one of the few historical sports institutions that continues to represent the occupied region of Abkhazia within the official jurisdiction of the Georgian Football Federation (GFF).

== Titles ==
The club has not won any official domestic trophies in the Georgian football league system.

== Other teams ==
Dinamo Gagra have its own academy for young players and several other teams across Georgian and regional Abkhazian football tournaments:

• Women's Liga 2;

• Silver Group of the Youth League;

• Liga 2 of the Amateur League;

• Children's League organized by the Abkhazian regional Football Federation.

Their women's futsal team has won the 2023–24 season of the national championship.
