= Dinamo Stadium, Sokhumi =

Stadium in Sokhumi, georgia

Dinamo Stadium
- Interactive map of Dinamo Stadium
- Full name: Dinamo Stadium
- Location: Sokhumi, Abkhazia georgia
- Coordinates: 43°00′00″N 41°00′00″E
- Capacity: 4,300 (All seated)
- Surface: grass

Construction
- Opened: 2015

Dinamo Stadium is a football stadium in Sokhumi, Georgia. It is home to Dinamo Sokhumi of the internationally unrecognized Abkhazian championship. Also the equally unrecognized Abkhazia national football team plays its matches on the stadium, having hosted the 2016 ConIFA World Football Cup and friendlies against a Donetsk People's Republic representative team.

The stadium was opened in 2015. It has a total capacity of 4300 seats. The East Stand (1700 seats) is located along Abazinskaia St and the main stand-West Stand (2600 seats) along Voronov street. There are six main stadium entrances are located on the sides of the two stress, with four secondary exits (emergency and technical) in the corners of the territory.

On the first floor are located: lobby, locker rooms with shower (two locker rooms for athletes, judges, and two locker rooms for children's sections), bathrooms, massage and trainer's rooms, First Aid, toilets, utility and technical rooms. On the second floor, apart from the facilities relating directly to football matches, there are hall, gyms with locker rooms, the press center. Press rooms are located on the third level of the main grandstand. The building is equipped with hot and cold water supply, sanitation, ventilation, electronic video scoreboard.

Ramps and special places for people with limited mobility and the accompanying are constructed for unhindered and convenient accessibility. Design solutions are based on modern trends of football stadiums design and construction and in accordance with the sanitary, fire and environmental requirements.
