= Football Club Yertsakhu Ochamchira =

FC Yertsakhu Ochamchira
- Full name: Football Club Yertsakhu Ochamchira
- Founded: 1993
- Ground: Vitaly Daraselii, Ochamchira, Abkhazia, Georgia
- League: Abkhazian Premier League; Abkhazian Cup; Abkhazia Super Cup
Home colours

Football Club Yertsakhu Ochamchira is a football club in the city of Ochamchira, in the state of Abkhazia that competes in the Abkhazian Premier League.

== History ==
Founded on 1993 in the city of Ochamchira in the state of Abkhazia, the club is affiliated with the Football Federation of Abkhazia. It plays in the Apnsy Super League and finished 4th in the 2024/2025 Season.

It is one of the most successful clubs in Abkhazia, being tied with two top division titles for 4th with FC Ritsa for the most top division titles. Its Hay day was in the mid 1990s, but it has experienced a revival winning the Abkhazian Cup in 2024.

== Titles ==
=== Abkhazian Premier League (2) ===
1996, 1998

=== Abkhazian Cup (3) ===
1994, 1997 and 2024

=== Abkhazia Super Cup (1) ===
1996

== Players 2020 ==
Nº	Position	Nation	Name	Year of birth	Age
1	GK	(Abkhazia)	Leon kutelia	2001	20
23	GK	(Abkhazia)	Sandro Ubiria	2005	16
4	DF	(Abkhazia)	Ruslan Logua	1986	35
5	MF	(Abkhazia)	Nika Narmania	2000	21
3	DF	(Abkhazia)	Andreas Aslandzia	1992	29
2	RS	(Abkhazia)	Levan Logua	1994	27
20	FW	(Abkhazia)	Ruslan Margania	1998	23
12		(Abkhazia)	Slavik Zubatov	1992	29
31		(Abkhazia)	Disse Mikvabiya	2005	16
8	MF	(Abkhazia)	Daniel Archelia	2001	20
17	LS	(Abkhazia)	David Logua	1991	30
7	FW	(Abkhazia)	Timur Gadelia	1998	23
6	LS	(Abkhazia)	Nestor Pachulia	1992	29
25		(Abkhazia)	Denis Khadzhimba	1998	23
21	MF	(Abkhazia)	Aslan Butba	1996	25
14	DF	(Abkhazia)	Ferik Amichba	1992	29
10	MF	(Abkhazia)	Mikhail Kutelia	1999	22
11	MF	(Abkhazia)	Anri Kishmaria	1999	22
55		(Abkhazia)	Alas Alteiba	1998	23
