= Football Club Samurzakan Gal =

Samurzakan Gal
- Full name: Football Club Samurzakan Gal
- Founded: 1999
- Ground: Samurzakan, Abkhazia, Georgia
- League: National Abkhazian Football League; Abkhazian Cup; Abkhazia Super Cup
Home colours

Football Club Samurzakan Gal is a football club in the city of Gali, in the state of Abkhazia that competes in the second division of association football in Abkhazia National Abkhazian Football League.

The colors of their home colours are white, blue and black.

== History ==
Founded on 1999 in the city of Gali in the state of Abkhazia, the club is affiliated with the Football Federation of Abkhazia.

The club played in the 2020 edition of the Abkhazia League. And the competition ended in seventh place..

The Club since coming last in the 2023 Abkhazian Premier league season held a relegation/promotion playoff against FC Bzana Kutol losing 6-2. This meant their relegation to the National Abkhazian Football League which they won in their return 2024 season, but lost their promotion playoff to FC Sadz Tsandrypsh 2-0, which means they stay in the NAFL.

== Titles ==
=== National Abkhazian Football League ===
- Champions (1)

2024
