= Abkhazia Super Cup =

Professional football competition

- Founded: 1996
- First season: 1996
- Country: (Abkhazia) FFA
- Confederation: CONIFA
- Domestic cup(s): Abkhazian Cup; Super Cup
- Current champions: FC Gagra (2025)
- Most championships: FC Nart Sukhum (13 titles)
- Current: 2025

The Abkhazia Super Cup is one of three professional football competitions held in Abkhazia and organized by the Football Federation of Abkhazia.

Football Club Nart Sukhum won the 2020 Super Cup title by beating the Football Club Gagra team.

== List of champions and runner-up ==
Year	Champions	Runner-up
1996	Yertsakhu Ochamchira	FC Dinamo Sukhumi
1999	FC Nart Sukhum	Dynamo Gagra
2000	FC Nart Sukhum (2)	FC Abazg Sukhum
2001	FC Nart Sukhum (3)	FC Abazg Sukhum
2002	FC Nart Sukhum (4)	Ritsa FC
2003	Not played; FC Nart Sukhum won the league-and-cup double	
2004	Not played; FC Kiaraz Pitsunda won the league-and-cup double	
2005	Not played; FC Nart Sukhum won the league-and-cup double	
2006	FC Gagra	FC Nart Sukhum
2007	Not played; FC Nart Sukhum won the league-and-cup double	
2008	FC Nart Sukhum (5)	FC Gagra
2009	FC Nart Sukhum (6)	FC Gagra
2010	FC Gagra (2)	FC Nart Sukhum
2011	FC Gagra (3)	FC Nart Sukhum
2012	FC Gagra (4)	FC Nart Sukhum
2013	FC Nart Sukhum (7)	FC Gagra
2014	FC Afon	FC Nart Sukhum
2015	FC Afon (2)	Ritsa FC
2016	FC Afon (3)	FC Nart Sukhum
2017	FC Nart Sukhum (8)	FC Afon
2018	FC Gagra (5)	FC Nart Sukhum
2019	FC Nart Sukhum (9)	FC Gagra
2020	FC Nart Sukhum (10)	FC Gagra
2021	FC Nart Sukhum (11)	FC Gagra
2022	FC Nart Sukhum (12)	Ritsa FC
2023	FC Gagra (6)	FC Dynamo Sukhum
2024	FC Nart Sukhum (13)	FC Yertsakhu Ochamchira
2025	FC Gagra (7)	FC Nart Sukhum

== Club Titles ==
- 13 FC Nart Sukhum
- 7 FC Gagra
- 3 FC Afon
- 1 FC Yertsakhu Ochamchira
