= F.C. Afon Novy Afon =

FC Axali Athoni
- Full name: Football Club Athoni Axali Athoni
- Founded: 2005
- Ground: Городской стадион, Novy Afon, Georgia
- League: Abkhazian Premier League; Abkhazian Cup; Abkhazia Super Cup
Home colours

F.C. Afon Novy Afon is a football club in the city of Novy Afon, in the state of Abkhazia that competes in the Abkhazian Premier League.

== History ==
Founded on 2005 in the city of Novy Afon in the state of Abkhazia, the club is affiliated with the Football Federation of Abkhazia.

== Titles ==
=== Abkhazian Premier League ===
- Champions(3)

2014, 2015, 2017

- Runners-Up (2)

2013, 2016

- Third Place (1)

2019

=== Abkhazian Cup ===
- Runners-Up (3)

2014, 2015, 2023

=== Abkhazia Super Cup ===
- Champions (3)

2014, 2015, 2016

- Runners-Up (1)

2017
