= Football Club Nart Sukhum =

Nart Sukhum
- Full name: Football Club Nart Sukhum
- Founded: 1997
- Ground: Dinamo Stadium, Sukhumi
- Capacity: 4,300
- President: Gennady Tsvinaria
- Head Coach: Astamur Logua
- League: Abkhazian Premier League; Abkhazian Cup; Abkhazia Super Cup
Home colours	Away colours

Football Club Nart Sukhum is a football club in the city of Sukhum, in the state of Abkhazia that competes in the Abkhazian Premier League.

== History ==
Founded on 1997 in the city of Sukhum in the state of Abkhazia, the club is affiliated with the Football Federation of Abkhazia. Nart Sukhum is the most successful football club in Abkhazia, with over 15 league titles.

== Titles ==
=== Abkhazian Premier League ===
The club has been Abkhazian Premier League champion in 15 editions, as well as an eight-time runner-up a third place finisher three times.

- Champions (13)

1999, 1999/00, 2003, 2005, 2007, 2008, 2009, 2011, 2013, 2016, 2018, 2018/19, 2020, 2021, 2024

- Runners-Up (8)

2001/02, 2004, 2006, 2010, 2012, 2015, 2022, 2025

- Third Place (4)

1998, 2000/01, 2017, 2023

=== Abkhazian Cup ===
The club has already reached the final of the competition in 18 editions and in 11 of them it was champion.

- Champions (11)

2001, 2002, 2003, 2005, 2006, 2007, 2008, 2014, 2016, 2017, 2019.

- Runners-Up (7)

1999, 2000, 2004, 2011, 2012, 2013, 2018

=== Abkhazia Super Cup ===
The club has played in the Abkhazia Super Cup 15 times, reaching the title 9 times.

- Champions (9)

1999, 2000, 2008, 2009, 2011, 2013, 2016, 2018,2019.

- Runners-Up (6)

2001, 2002, 2006, 2012, 2014, 2017.
