= Ritsa Football Club =

Georgian football club

FC "Ritsa" Gudauta
- Full name: Football Club "Ritsa" Gudauta
- Founded: 1994
- Ground: Lev Azhiba, Sukhumi, Abkhazia, Georgia
- President: Beslan Gubliya
- Head Coach: Raphael Bagatelia
- League: Abkhazian Premier League; Abkhazian Cup; Abkhazia Super Cup
Home colours

FC "Ritsa" Gudauta is a football club in the city of Gudauta, in the state of Abkhazia that competes in the Apsny Super League.

== History ==
Founded on 1994 in the city of Gudauta in the state of Abkhazia, the club is affiliated with the Football Federation of Abkhazia.

A feeder club of FC "Ritsa" Gudauta plays in the Abkhaz second division the 'National Abkhazian Football League" as FC "Ritsa-2" Gudauta.

== Titles ==
=== Abkhazian Premier League ===
Sources:

- Champions(2)

2002, 2022

- Runners-Up (5)

2001, 2003, 2020, 2021, 2023

- Third Place (8)

2004, 2005, 2006, 2012, 2014, 2015, 2018, 2024

=== Abkhazian Cup ===
- Champions (2)

2015, 2022

- Runners-Up (4)

2002, 2005, 2019, 2020

=== Abkhazia Super Cup ===
- Runners-Up (2)

2015, 2022
