= FC Dinamo Sokhumi =

Football club based in Sokhumi, Georgia

Dinamo sokhumi
- Full name: Football Club Dinamo sokhumi
- Founded: 1927; 99 years ago
- Ground: avaza stadium
- Capacity: 500
- Manager: vasil cheishvili
- League: Regionuli Liga
- 2025: Regionuli Liga, 4th of 14
Home colours	Away colours

FC Dinamo Sokhumi (Georgian: სკ სოხუმის დინამო) is a Georgian association football club from Sokhumi, Georgia, temporarily based in Tbilisi.

The most successful club of Abkhazian ASSR currently competes in Regionuli Liga, the fifth tier of Georgian championship.

== History ==
=== In the Soviet leagues ===
Founded in 1925, Dinamo Sokhumi took part in the Soviet football league system since 1936. The club long played in the Soviet Second League and brought up several well-known Soviet football players. Among them were Nikita Simonyan, Valter Sanaya, Daur Akhvlediani, Avtandil Gogoberidze, Akhrik Tsveiba, Gennadi Bondaruk, Georgy Grammatikopulo, Temur Ketsbaia and Ruslan Ajinjal who all started their professional career at Dinamo Sokhumi or spent significant amount of time at the club.

In 1960s Dinamo spent several seasons in Class B of the Soviet third division. From 1971 to 1990, apart from three seasons (1974–76), they competed in different zones of the Soviet Second league. In the Soviet Cup competition Dinamo achieved their biggest success in 1987 when they reached 1/8 finals, having eliminated Spartak Ordzhonikidze from the First league and Dinamo Minsk, the Supreme League club.

In 1989 the club clinched the title, won a subsequent play-off tournament and for the first time in their history got promoted to the First League.

Overall results achieved by Dinamo Sokhumi in II league are the following:

M	W	D	L	GD
848	349	199	300	1179–1002

Meanwhile, in early 1990, Georgian Football Federation established new Umaglesi Liga. An absolute majority of Georgian football clubs, including Dinamo Tbilisi and Torpedo Kutaisi, withdrew from the Soviet league. In contrast, Dinamo Sokhumi chose to remain in the Soviet football system where they played in the First League two more seasons up until 1991. This political issue divided Dinamo Sokhumi. While ten players decided to remain in the club, most players and members of the staff opted for participation in the Georgian top league. For this purpose they formed new club FC Tskhumi Sokhumi.

With the formal collapse of USSR in the dying days of 1991 all Soviet leagues were abolished. As a result, there was no tournament left where Dinamo could participate in 1992. In August the war in Abkhazia, Georgia, broke out and all Abkhazian football clubs were temporarily dissolved.

=== After 2000 ===
Logo of Dinamo

In early 2000s the club resumed functioning in Tbilisi, formed by IDP from Abkhazia, as Dinamo Sokhumi. The club played in the 2005-06 season in the top division of the Georgian championship. For a short time around 2006 it was also known as ASMC Sokhumi. Due to financial problems the club was gradually relegated to lower Regionuli Liga.

Since 2013 Dinamo has been competing again in the Regionuli Liga.

== Achievements ==
- SSR Georgia Champion: 2

1947, 1948

=== Seasons in the Soviet leagues ===
Season	League	Pos.	Pl.	W	D	L	GF	GA	P	Cup	Notes	Manager
1988	3	12	38	18	7	13	55	42	43	1/8		
1989	3	1	42	29	7	6	92	35	65	1/64	play-off won, promoted	
1990	2	12	38	14	8	16	36	41	36	1/64		
1991	2	10	42	16	11	15	50	50	43	1/64		
2000–01	Regionuli Liga West											
2001–02	Regionuli Liga West											
2002–03	Regionuli Liga West											
2003–04	Regionuli Liga East											
2004–05	Regionuli Liga East											
2005–06	Umaglesi Liga	15	30	5	3	22	26	70	18	Round of 16		
2006–07	Regionuli Liga East											

== Other teams ==
Dinamo Sokhumi also has junior and women's teams. The latter currently taking part in division 1 of Georgian women's league secured the bronze medals in the 2022 season. Their reserve team is represented in the second tier.

In late December 2020 head coach Davit Tavartkiladze and team captain Tamar Akhlobadze were awarded a special governmental prize for their contribution to the development of Abkhazian football. Dinamo Sokhumi is the first club in the South Caucasus to have formed a football academy for women.

== Colors and badge ==
Dinamo's traditional kit colors were blue and white. Their crest was of a blue letter "D", written in a traditional cursive style, on a white background with the name of their home town "Sokhumi" written in front of a football underneath.
