= Football Federation of Abkhazia =

Football governing body in partially recognized European state

ConIFA
- Location: Abkhazia
- ConIFA affiliation: 2014
- President: Shabbat Logua
- Vice President: Henri Hagba
- Website: https://ff-ra.ru/

The Football Federation of Abkhazia regulates football in Abkhazia. They are a member of CONIFA but not of UEFA or FIFA due to their political status.

== History ==
On 25 February 2004, it was announced that Nart Vice President Gennadi Tsvinaria had won the election to succeed Vice President of Abkhazia Valeri Arshba as Chairman of the Football Federation. Sukhumi City Assembly Chairman Roman Gvinjia was elected Vice Chairman.

In 2007, First Deputy Minister for Taxes and Fees (and later Interior Minister) Leonid Dzapshba became President of the Federation. During his tenure, he accepted funding from Russia in order to open thirteen new football training centres in Abkhazia due to there having been no funding for football prior due to the Russo-Georgian War. In March 2012, former Dynamo Sukhum top player Jemal Gubaz was elected to succeed Dzapshba.

On 8 September 2015, the FFA announced that the upcoming leadership election had been moved forward to October from the Spring of 2016, so as to leave more time for the preparation of the 2016 ConIFA World Football Cup, hosted by Abkhazia. Initially, there were two candidates, incumbent Chairman Gubaz and Ruslan Ajinjal, who had announced his retirement from professional football on 7 June. However, on 21 September, Gubaz announced his immediate resignation. On 25 September FFA Council decided to hold the election on 15 October, with Ajinjal as the only candidate. Ajinjal was elected unanimously.

On 24 January 2017, Ajinjal resigned as Chairman, and on 25 February, the coach of Abkhazia's national football team Juma Kvaratskhelia was unanimously elected as his successor.

The Football Federation of Abkhazia contains three football leagues, the top division 'Apsny Super League', the second division 'National Abkhazian Football League' and the Amateur football league of Abkhazia. As well as two domestic cups the Abkhazian Cup and the Super Cup.
