= CONIFA Africa =

African football Association

Confederation of Independent Football Associations Africa Continental bodies.
- Nickname: ConIFA Africa
- Formation: 15 August 2013; 13 years ago
- Type: Federation of associations
- Headquarters: Africa
- Members: 4 Members
- Official languages: English is the official language for minutes, correspondence and announcements. French, German, Spanish and Italian are additional languages
- President: Ngala Maimo Wajiri
- Website: www.conifa.org

Confederation of Independent Football Association (CONIFA) is the football Association organizing football games outside FIFA. And CONIFA Africa is the continental body for CONIFA.

== Members ==
=== Current members ===
As of March 2025

Africa (4)
Biafra
Kabylie
Katanga
Yoruba

=== Former Members ===
Team
Barawa
Barotseland
Chagos Islands
Matabeleland
Somaliland
Western Sahara
Zanzibar

== Competitions ==
- CONIFA African Football Cup

== Important personalities ==
=== Africa President ===
Africa President of ConIFA
No.	Name	Country of origin	Took office	Left office
1	Masoud Attai	Zanzibar	7 June 2013	2017
2	Justin Walley	England	2017	2020
3	Christian Lubasi Luzongo Kalalaluka	Zambia	2020	2021
3	Ngala Maimo Wajiri	Cameroon	2021	Incumbent
