= CONIFA No Limits Mediterranean Futsal Cup =

- Organiser(s): CONIFA
- Founded: 2020; 6 years ago
- Region: Mediterranean Sea area
- Teams: 6
- Current champions: County of Nice
- Most championships: County of Nice (1 title)
- 2021 CONIFA No Limits Mediterranean Futsal Cup

The CONIFA No Limits Mediterranean Futsal Cup is an international futsal football tournament organized by CONIFA, an umbrella association for states, minorities, stateless peoples and regions unaffiliated with FIFA.

== Editions ==
=== Sanremo 2021 ===
On August 26, 2021, CONIFA announced that the first edition of the CONIFA No Limits Mediterranean Futsal Cup would take place in Sanremo, Italy, and feature 6 teams (County of Nice, Elba, Sardinia, Sicily, Seborga, Terra Brigasca). The tournament was played in two groups of three and the top team from each group advanced to final. Second top team in the group advanced to third-place match. County of Nice won the first edition of the tournament.

== Results ==
Ed.	Year	Host	First place game			Third place game			Num. teams
Ed.	Year	Host	(gold) Champion	Score	(silver) Runner-up	(bronze) Third	Score	Fourth	Num. teams
1	2021	Italy	County of Nice	5–2	Sardinia	Elba	4-4; 5-4 (p)	Sicily	6

== Appearances ==
Legend

- 1st — Champions
- 2nd — Runners-up
- 3rd — Third place
- 4th — Fourth place
- 5th — Fifth place
- 6th — Sixth Place
- — Hosts

For each tournament, the number of teams in each finals tournament (in brackets) are shown.

CONIFA No Limits Mediterranean Futsal Cup
Team (Total 6 teams)	2021 (Chile) (3)
County of Nice	1st
Sardinia	2nd
Elba	3rd
Sicily	4th
Seborga	5th
Terra Brigasca	6th

== See also ==
- CONIFA
