= Yoruba Football Federation =

Football organization in West Africa

- Sport: Football
- Jurisdiction: Yorubaland
- Abbreviation: YFF
- Founded: 2020
- Affiliation: ConIFA (2020)
- Headquarters: Onikan Stadium
- Chairperson: S. Salako
- Secretary: S. Enikanoniaye

Official website
- www.yorubaff.org

The Yoruba Football Federation (YFF, Yoruba: Egbe Omo Agbabolu Ile yoruba), is the governing body of football in Yorubaland. The association was established in 2020. The current Chairman and General Secretary is S Salako and S. Enikanoniaye respectively. It supervises the Yoruba national football team.
