= Sicily national football team =

Non-FIFA national football team representing the island of Sicily

Sicily
- Nickname: Naziunali Siciliana
- Association: Sicilia Football Association
- Confederation: None
- Head coach: Giovanni Marchese
- Captain: Davis Curiale
- Most caps: Davis Curiale (7)
- Top scorer: Davis Curiale (5)
- Home stadium: Various
- FIFA code: SIC
First colours	Second colours	Third colours

First international
- Sicily 4–1 Sardinia (Mazara del Vallo, Italy; 10 June 2022)

Biggest win
- Sicily 5–1 Côte d'Ivoire LFP (Caltanissetta, Italy; 14 June 2025)

Biggest defeat
- Sicily 1–2 Mauritius (Terrasini, Italy; 8 June 2026)

The Sicily national football team (Sicilian: Naziunali Siciliana di Palluni) is the representative football team of the island of Sicily. It is controlled by the Sicilia Football Association and is also colloquially referred to with the name Naziunali Siciliana. The Sicilia F.A. was founded in 2020.

It is not affiliated with FIFA or UEFA, and therefore cannot participate in the FIFA World Cup or the UEFA European Championship. In June 2021, the Sicilia F.A. joined the CONIFA, but in October 2023, just two years later, it announced its departure with regret and disappointment. In an official press release, the association criticized CONIFA for its lack of professionalism, noting that it had not participated in any official competitions. The Sicilia F.A. emphasized its ambition to seek international recognition and compete in serious, challenging tournaments.

== History ==
In the past, the idea of creating a Sicilian national team has been already proposed by some journalists and Sicilianist circles.

The current project started in 2019 following the first contacts with CONIFA. The project was born thanks to the synergy of a Founding Committee from the three metropolitan cities of Sicily: Palermo, Catania and Messina. The official foundation of the Sicilia F.A. dates back to 15 May 2020, while the public activities were launched in 2021.

At the foundation Salvatore Mangano from Messina was chosen as President, Angelo Priolo and Fabio Petrucci from Palermo as Vice-president and General Secretary, while the Sporting Director Alberto L'Episcopo from Catania – a former Manager of the Serie A team Chievo Verona– is the General Manager and Head of the Sporting Area. Mario Bonsignore – former President of A.C. Ancona, Manager of F.C. Messina and Marketing Manager of the Malta Football Association – is the General Consultant.

One of the main goals of the Sicilia F.A. is the promotion of the Sicilian national identity through football. Indeed, the initiative of the Sicilian national football team is based on the idea that Sicily represents a stateless nation with its own geographical peculiarities, history, language and culture. The Sicilia F.A. has already signed partnerships with the "Accademia della Lingua Siciliana" ("Academy of the Sicilian Language") and the Cultural Association "Lu Statutu" in order to realize its goal.

Very soon, the birth of the Sicilia F.A. inspired the fantasies in the media about the international players that theoretically could wear the jersey of the team, from Mario Balotelli to Vincenzo Grifo.

The first two football associations that acknowledged the Sicilia F.A. were the national football teams of Sardinia and Corsica.

The Global Executive Committee of the CONIFA accepted Sicily as a member association on 27 June 2021.

The Sicilia F.A., with a futsal selection, is one of the six participants to the 2021 CONIFA No Limits Mediterranean Futsal Cup. 18 October, 2023, Sicily announced it had withdrawn from CONIFA after not featuring in any CONIFA tournament.

== Colours and logo ==
Flag of the Sicilian Vespers

The official colours of the Sicilian national football team are red and yellow, like the flag of Sicily.

The logo of the Sicilia F.A. is based on the flag of the Sicilian Vespers and contains the motto “Animus Tuus Dominus”, used by the Sicilian rebels during the anti-Angevin revolution.

== Kits ==
The Sicilia F.A. announced three new football jerseys, all dedicated to the history of Sicily and its iconic historical women

- 1st: "Medusa": red and yellow with the emblem of the Sicilian Triskelion, this kit honors Medusa and commemorates the Sicilian Vespers;
- 2nd: "Costanza": White with diagonal red and yellow stripes, Norman-style chequered trim on the collar and sleeves, and the Swabian eagle on the shoulders, the pattern draws inspiration from Sicily’s unique medieval architecture, this kit honors Constance I of Sicily and Constance II of Sicily;
- 3rd: "Adelasia": Blue, representing the shield of the Hauteville family, with trim inspired by Roger Cloak and a pattern inspired by the Byzantine mosaics of Sicily, this kit honors Adelasia del Vasto

In April 2025 the Sicilia FA presents its new official supplier Insula Sportiva.

== Fixtures and results ==
This is a list of results for the matches played since 2022, including friendly matches against full FIFA international teams and others against fellow representative teams which are not aligned to FIFA and against professional or amateur clubs.

Win Draw Loss Fixture

10 June 2022 Antudo Cup	Sicily	4 – 1	Sardinia	Mazara del Vallo, Italy
18:45	Ortisi 31'; Savanarola 54'; Bulevardi 57'; Curiale 83'	Report	89' Bianco	Stadium: Stadio Nino Vaccara; Attendance: 2,000; Referee: Alessandro Angelo

10 June 2023 Sikelia Cup	Sicily	1 - 0	Corsica	Caltanissetta, Italy
18:00	Curiale 69'	Report		Stadium: Stadio Marco Tomaselli; Referee: Antonio Gabriel Haba

23 May 2024 Corsica Cup (Semi-finals)	Sicily	1 - 1 (3 - 4 p)	Saint Martin	Corte, France
19:00	Saraniti 90+2'	Report	13' Segarel	Stadium: Stade Santos Manfredi

25 May 2024 Corsica Cup (3rd place playoff)	Sicily	1 - 0	Sardinia	Afa, France
14:30	Alma 61'	Report		Stadium: Afa Stadium

11 June 2025 Friendly	Sicily	3 - 0	Cape Verde diaspora	Castelbuono, Italy
18:00				Stadium: Stadio Comunale Luigi Failla

14 June 2025 Sikelia Cup	Sicily	5 - 1	Côte d'Ivoire LFP	Caltanissetta, Italy
18:00				Stadium: Stadio Marco Tomaselli

8 June 2026 Sikelia Cup	Sicily	1 - 2	Mauritius	Terrasini, Italy
18:00	Maltese 12'		4' Aristide; 90+1' Antoine	Stadium: Stadio Salvatore Favazza

== Managers ==
- 2022– : Giovanni Marchese

== Players ==
=== Current squad ===
Below is the list of players called by coach Giovanni Marchese for the Corsica Cup (22-25 May 2024). Caps, goals and numbers as per 25 May 2024.

No.	Pos.	Player	Date of birth (age)	Caps	Goals	Club
1	GK	Gaetano Dolenti	16 May 1991 (age 35)	3	0	(Sicily Football Association) Sancataldese
12	GK	Giuseppe Polizzi	20 December 1991 (age 34)	1	0	(Sicily Football Association) San Giorgio Piana
2	DF	Damiano Lia	25 November 1997 (age 28)	3	0	(Sicily Football Association) Messina
3	DF	Andrea Ferrigno	12 October 1989 (age 36)	1	0	(Sicily Football Association) Igea Virtus
4	DF	Salvatore Tosto	11 February 1997 (age 29)	2	0	(Sicily Football Association) Enna
5	DF	Giuseppe Zappalà	28 May 1990 (age 36)	1	0	(Sicily Football Association) Enna
6	DF	Simone Brugaletta	19 January 1994 (age 32)	4	0	(Italian Football Federation) Santa Maria Cilento
17	DF	Alessio Asero	10 November 2000 (age 25)	2	0	(Sicily Football Association) Paternò
18	DF	Salvatore Mollica	29 September 2000 (age 26)	3	0	(Sicily Football Association) Paternò
22	DF	Giuseppe Filì	4 November 2002 (age 23)	0	0	(Italian Football Federation) Vastogirardi
23	DF	Rosario Licata	16 January 1989 (age 37)	3	0	(Sicily Football Association) Mazara 46
8	MF	Giorgio Tumbarello	20 April 1996 (age 30)	2	0	(Italian Football Federation) Lucchese
13	MF	Riccardo Correnti	24 February 2001 (age 25)	0	0	(Sicily Football Association) Sancataldese
15	MF	Nino Garofalo	6 December 2001 (age 24)	1	0	(Sicily Football Association) Milazzo
19	MF	Francesco Giunta	19 March 1999 (age 27)	2	0	(Sicily Football Association) Messina
20	MF	Salvatore Cocimano	27 September 1990 (age 36)	2	0	(Sicily Football Association) Enna
24	MF	Enrico Giannone	23 June 2004 (age 22)	0	0	(Sicily Football Association) Licata
7	FW	Antonino Musso	14 September 1999 (age 27)	2	0	(Italian Football Federation) Bra
9	FW	Andrea Saraniti	23 July 1988 (age 38)	2	1	(Italian Football Federation) Altamura
11	FW	Davis Curiale	30 December 1987 (age 38)	6	5	(Italian Football Federation) Terracina
14	FW	Tommaso Bonanno	3 August 1995 (age 31)	2	0	(Italian Football Federation) Martina
16	FW	Vincenzo Vitale	26 November 2000 (age 25)	1	0	(Italian Football Federation) Varesina
21	FW	Giuliano Alma	27 July 1993 (age 33)	2	1	(Sicily Football Association) Siracusa

=== Recent call-ups ===
The following players have also been called up for the team recently and are still available for selection.

Pos.	Player	Date of birth (age)	Caps	Goals	Club	Latest call-up
GK	Federico Valenti	6 June 1993 (age 33)	1	0	(Sicily) Sancataldese	vs. Sardinia, 10 June 2022
DF	Valerio Genesio	28 April 1987 (age 39)	1	0	(Sicily) Mazarese	vs. Sardinia, 10 June 2022
DF	Salvatore Mollica	1 January 2000 (age 26)	1	0	(Sicily) Acireale	vs. Sardinia, 10 June 2022
MF	Danilo Bulevardi	31 January 1995 (age 31)	1	1	(Italy) Gubbio	vs. Sardinia, 10 June 2022
MF	Francesco Corso	27 November 1997 (age 28)	1	0	(Sicily) Mazarese	vs. Sardinia, 10 June 2022
MF	Mattia Tumminelli	12 August 1997 (age 29)	1	0	(Sicily) Acireale	vs. Sardinia, 10 June 2022
FW	Pasqualino Ortisi	24 April 2002 (age 24)	1	1	(Italy) Fidelis Andria	vs. Sardinia, 10 June 2022
FW	Alessio Rizzo	3 October 1998 (age 28)	1	0	(Sicily) Paternò	vs. Sardinia, 10 June 2022
FW	Mattia Retucci	6 December 2000 (age 25)	1	0	(Sicily) Nissa	vs. Sardinia, 10 June 2022

== Individual records ==
As per 25 May 2024

Most Caps
Rank	Name	Caps	Goal	Career
1	Simone Brugaletta	4	0	2022–Present
1	Davis Curiale	4	2	2022–Present
2	Rosario Licata	3	0	2022–Present
2	Damiano Lia	3	0	2022–Present
2	Salvatore Mollica	3	0	2022–Present
2	Gaetano Dolenti	3	0	2022–Present
2	Vincenzo Vitale	3	0	2022–Present
3	Many players	2		

Most Goals
Rank	Name	Goals	Caps	Career
1	Davis Curiale	5	6	2022–Present
2	Andrea Saraniti	2	4	2024–Present
2	Gabriele Zerbo	2	2	2025–Present
3	Danilo Bulevardi	1	1	2022–Present
3	Pasqualino Ortisi	1	1	2022–Present
3	Giuseppe Savonarola	1	1	2022–Present
3	Giuliano Alma	1	2	2024–Present

== Anthem ==
The Sicilia F.A. ha chosen as official anthem the cabaletta Suoni la tromba from I puritani (1835) by Vincenzo Bellini.

== Competitive record ==
Champions Runners-up Third place Hosts

=== CONIFA No Limits Mediterranean Futsal Cup ===
Year	Position	Pld	W	D*	L	GF	GA
CONIFA No Limits Mediterranean Futsal Cup
(Italy) 2021	4th	3	1	1	1	6	6
Total	0 Titles	3	1	1	1	6	6

=== CONIFA European Football Cup ===
Year	Position	Pld	W	D*	L	GF	GA
ConIFA European Football Cup
(County of Nice) 2022	Cancelled						
(Northern Cyprus) 2023	Cancelled						
Total		0	0	0	0	0	0

=== Antudo Cup / Sikelia Cup ===
Year	Position	Pld	W	D*	L	GF	GA
Antudo Cup
(Sicily) 2022	1st	1	1	0	0	4	1
Sikelia Cup
(Sicily) 2023	1st	1	1	0	0	1	0
(Sicily) 2025	1st	1	1	0	0	5	1
(Sicily) 2026	2nd	1	0	0	1	1	2
Total	3 Titles	3	3	0	1	11	4

=== Corsica Cup ===
Year	Position	Pld	W	D*	L	GF	GA
Corsica Cup
(Corsica) 2024	3rd	2	1	1	0	2	1
Total	0 Titles	2	1	1	0	2	1

*Denotes draws include knockout matches decided via penalty shoot-out.

== Honours ==
- Sikelia Cup (formerly Antudo Cup)
  - Winners (3): 2022, 2023, 2025
  - Runners-up (1): 2026
- Corsica Cup
  - Third place (1): 2024

Competition	1st place, gold medalist(s)	2nd place, silver medalist(s)	3rd place, bronze medalist(s)	Total
Sikelia Cup (formerly Antudo Cup)	3	1	0	4
Corsica Cup	0	0	1	1
Total	3	1	1	5

== See also ==
- Sicily
- Sport in Sicily
- Non-FIFA international football
