= 2018–19 FA Cup =

138th edition of the FA Cup

Football Association Challenge Cup

Tournament details
- Country: England; Wales
- Dates: 11 August 2018 – 18 May 2019
- Teams: 736 (overall); 644 (qualifying competition); 124 (main competition)

Final positions
- Champions: Manchester City (6th title)
- Runners-up: Watford

Tournament statistics
- Matches played: 126
- Goals scored: 360 (2.86 per match)
- Attendance: 1,200,703 (9,529 per match)
- Top goal scorers: Padraig Amond; Gabriel Jesus; (5 goals each)
- (Note: All statistics do not include qualifying play-offs)

The 2018–19 FA Cup (also known as the Football Association Challenge Cup) was the 138th edition of the oldest football tournament in the world. It was sponsored by Emirates and known as the Emirates FA Cup for sponsorship purposes. It started with the extra preliminary round on the weekend of 11 August 2018 and concluded with the final on 18 May 2019.

Premier League side Chelsea were the defending champions, but were eliminated by Manchester United, whom they beat in the previous season's final, in the fifth round. Manchester City won their sixth FA Cup title and their first since 2011. Having won the EFL Cup and the Premier League earlier in the season, they became the first English club to complete a domestic treble.

== Teams ==
Round	Clubs remaining	Clubs involved	Winners from previous round	New entries this round	Leagues entering at this round
First round proper	124	80	32	48	24 EFL League One teams 24 EFL League Two teams
Second round proper	84	40	40	none	none
Third round proper	64	64	20	44	20 Premier League teams 24 EFL Championship teams
Fourth round proper	32	32	32	none	none
Fifth round proper	16	16	16	none	none
Quarter-finals	8	8	8	none	none
Semi-finals	4	4	4	none	none
Final	2	2	2	none	none

== Round and draw dates ==
Phase	Round	Draw date	First match date	Ref.
Qualifying rounds	Extra preliminary round	6 July 2018	10 August 2018	
Qualifying rounds	Preliminary round	6 July 2018	24 August 2018	
Qualifying rounds	First round qualifying	28 August 2018	8 September 2018	
Qualifying rounds	Second round qualifying	10 September 2018	22 September 2018	
Qualifying rounds	Third round qualifying	24 September 2018	6 October 2018	
Qualifying rounds	Fourth round qualifying	8 October 2018	20 October 2018	
Main tournament	First round proper	22 October 2018	10 November 2018	
Main tournament	Second round proper	12 November 2018	1 December 2018	
Main tournament	Third round proper	3 December 2018	4 January 2019	
Main tournament	Fourth round proper	7 January 2019	26 January 2019	
Main tournament	Fifth round proper	28 January 2019	16 February 2019	
Main tournament	Quarter-finals	18 February 2019	16 March 2019	
Main tournament	Semi-finals	17 March 2019	6 April 2019	
Main tournament	Final	17 March 2019	18 May 2019	

== Qualifying rounds ==
All teams that entered the competition, but were not members of the Premier League or The Football League, competed in the qualifying rounds to secure one of 32 places available in the first round proper. The qualifying competition began with the extra preliminary round on 10 August 2016, with the fourth and final qualifying round played over the weekend of 20 October.

The winners from the fourth qualifying round were Guiseley, FC Halifax Town, Salford City, Chorley, Hartlepool United, Southport, Chesterfield, York City, Solihull Moors, Wrexham, Gateshead, Stockport County, Alfreton Town, Oxford City, Hitchin Town, Woking, Maidenhead United, Slough Town, Weston-super-Mare, Boreham Wood, Metropolitan Police, Aldershot Town, Bromley, Torquay United, Hampton & Richmond Borough, Billericay Town, Sutton United, Ebbsfleet United, Maidstone United, Haringey Borough, Barnet and Dover Athletic.

Haringey Borough was the only club in this season's tournament appearing in the competition proper for the first time. Of the other successful qualifiers, Hampton & Richmond Borough and Hitchin Town were the only clubs not to have featured in the first round at least once in the previous decade, appearing at this stage for the first time since 2007-08 and 1995-96 respectively.

== First round proper ==
The first round draw took place on 22 October and was made by Dennis Wise and Dion Dublin. All 40 first round proper ties were to be played on the weekend of 10 November with 13 replays to be played on 20 and 21 November. 32 teams from the qualifying competition joined 48 teams from League One and League Two to compete in this round. This round included three teams from Level 7, the lowest-ranked teams still in the competition at that point: Metropolitan Police, Haringey Borough and Hitchin Town.

9 November 2018	Haringey Borough (7)	0–1	AFC Wimbledon (3)	Tottenham, London
19:55 GMT		Report	Pinnock 90'	Stadium: Coles Park; Attendance: 2,710; Referee: Michael Salisbury

10 November 2018	Maidenhead United (5)	0–4	Portsmouth (3)	Maidenhead
12:30 GMT		Report	B. Thompson 42'; Hawkins 55'; Lowe 60'; Wheeler 83'	Stadium: York Road; Attendance: 3,205; Referee: Dean Whitestone

10 November 2018	Maidstone United (5)	2–1	Macclesfield Town (4)	Maidstone
15:00 GMT	Powell 51'; Turgott 69' (pen.)	Report	Stevens 14'	Stadium: Gallagher Stadium; Attendance: 2,169; Referee: Neil Hair

10 November 2018	Ebbsfleet United (5)	0–0	Cheltenham Town (4)	Northfleet
15:00 GMT		Report		Stadium: Stonebridge Road; Attendance: 1,624; Referee: John Busby

20 November 2018 Replay	Cheltenham Town (4)	2–0	Ebbsfleet United (5)	Cheltenham
19:45 GMT	Barnett 66'; Addai 90+4'	Report		Stadium: Whaddon Road; Attendance: 1,435; Referee: Chris Sarginson

10 November 2018	Swindon Town (4)	2–1	York City (6)	Swindon
15:00 GMT	Twine 12'; Alzate 76'	Report	Ferguson 43'	Stadium: County Ground; Attendance: 3,744; Referee: Carl Brook

10 November 2018	Torquay United (6)	0–1	Woking (6)	Torquay
15:00 GMT		Report	Kretzschmar 48' (pen.)	Stadium: Plainmoor; Attendance: 2,419; Referee: Declan Bourne

10 November 2018	Scunthorpe United (3)	2–1	Burton Albion (3)	Scunthorpe
15:00 GMT	Perch 16'; Novak 33'	Report	Boyce 79'	Stadium: Glanford Park; Attendance: 2,260; Referee: Andy Haines

10 November 2018	Aldershot Town (5)	1–1	Bradford City (3)	Aldershot
15:00 GMT	Fowler 12'	Report	Knight-Percival 71'	Stadium: The EBB Stadium; Attendance: 2,455; Referee: Paul Marsden

20 November 2018 Replay	Bradford City (3)	1–1 (a.e.t.) (4–1 p)	Aldershot Town (5)	Bradford
19:45 GMT	Fowler 101' (o.g.)	Report	Howell 108'	Stadium: Valley Parade; Attendance: 2,248; Referee: Graham Salisbury
	Penalties
	Doyle (penalty scored); Brünker (penalty scored); L. O'Brien (penalty scored); Payne (penalty scored)		(penalty missed) McClure; (penalty missed) Osho; (penalty scored) McDonnell

10 November 2018	Grimsby Town (4)	3–1	Milton Keynes Dons (4)	Cleethorpes
15:00 GMT	Embleton 50'; Thomas 61'; Vernam 73'	Report	Agard 23'	Stadium: Blundell Park; Attendance: 1,991; Referee: Carl Boveson

10 November 2018	Bromley (5)	1–3	Peterborough United (3)	Bromley, London
15:00 GMT	Johnson 40'	Report	Godden 48', 56'; Ward 84'	Stadium: Hayes Lane; Attendance: 3,107; Referee: Kevin Johnson

10 November 2018	Southport (6)	2–0	Boreham Wood (5)	Southport
15:00 GMT	Winnard 29'; Gilchrist 70'	Report		Stadium: Haig Avenue; Attendance: 1,460; Referee: Marc Edwards

10 November 2018	Plymouth Argyle (3)	1–0	Stevenage (4)	Plymouth
15:00 GMT	Lameiras 90+4'	Report		Stadium: Home Park; Attendance: 5,719; Referee: Alan Young

10 November 2018	Chesterfield (5)	1–1	Billericay Town (6)	Chesterfield
15:00 GMT	Maguire 17'	Report	Emmanuel 52'	Stadium: Proact Stadium; Attendance: 2,952; Referee: Martin Woods

20 November 2018 Replay	Billericay Town (6)	1–3	Chesterfield (5)	Billericay
19:45 GMT	Kizzi 63'	Report	Denton 40', 65', 87'	Stadium: New Lodge; Attendance: 2,493; Referee: Jacob Miles

10 November 2018	Lincoln City (4)	3–2	Northampton Town (4)	Lincoln
15:00 GMT	Anderson 16'; Pett 52'; Andrade 90+2'	Report	Bridge 55' van Veen 81'	Stadium: Sincil Bank; Attendance: 6,012; Referee: Graham Salisbury

10 November 2018	Yeovil Town (4)	1–3	Stockport County (6)	Yeovil
15:00 GMT	Fisher 8'	Report	Warburton 34'; Bell 38'; Mulhern 62'	Stadium: Huish Park; Attendance: 2,550; Referee: David Rock

10 November 2018	Bury (4)	5–0	Dover Athletic (5)	Bury
15:00 GMT	O'Shea 12'; Mayor 18'; Moore 36', 64'; Telford 90+1'	Report		Stadium: Gigg Lane; Attendance: 2,355; Referee: Richard Hulme

10 November 2018	Gillingham (3)	0–0	Hartlepool United (5)	Gillingham
15:00 GMT		Report		Stadium: Priestfield Stadium; Attendance: 2,224; Referee: Brett Huxtable

21 November 2018 Replay	Hartlepool United (5)	3–4 (a.e.t.)	Gillingham (3)	Hartlepool
19:45 GMT	Magnay 21'; McLaughlin 32'; O'Neill 114'	Report	Ehmer 50'; Eaves 90+6' (pen.); O'Neill 102'; List 107'	Stadium: Victoria Park; Attendance: 1,873; Referee: Scott Oldham

10 November 2018	Oxford United (3)	0–0	Forest Green Rovers (4)	Oxford
15:00 GMT		Report		Stadium: Kassam Stadium; Attendance: 3,933; Referee: Nick Kinseley

20 November 2018 Replay	Forest Green Rovers (4)	0–3	Oxford United (3)	Nailsworth
19:45 GMT		Report	Henry 36'; Mackie 47'; Browne 78'	Stadium: The New Lawn; Attendance: 1,614; Referee: Trevor Kettle

10 November 2018	Tranmere Rovers (4)	3–3	Oxford City (6)	Birkenhead
15:00 GMT	Jennings 34', 78'; Norwood 89'	Report	Tshimanga 39', 66', 82'	Stadium: Prenton Park; Attendance: 4,206; Referee: Daniel Middleton

20 November 2018 Replay	Oxford City (6)	0–2	Tranmere Rovers (4)	Marston, Oxford
19:45 GMT		Report	Norwood 6'; Mullin 30'	Stadium: Court Place Farm; Attendance: 1,172; Referee: Craig Hicks

10 November 2018	Accrington Stanley (3)	1–0	Colchester United (4)	Accrington
15:00 GMT	Barlaser 34'	Report		Stadium: Crown Ground; Attendance: 1,267; Referee: Martin Coy

10 November 2018	Barnsley (3)	4–0	Notts County (4)	Barnsley
15:00 GMT	Woodrow 48'; Fryers 53'; Potts 77'; Moore 81'	Report		Stadium: Oakwell; Attendance: 5,878; Referee: Sebastian Stockbridge

10 November 2018	Metropolitan Police (7)	0–2	Newport County (4)	East Molesey, London
15:00 GMT		Report	Amond 41'; Matt 48'	Stadium: Imber Court; Attendance: 1,137; Referee: Matt Donohue

10 November 2018	Walsall (3)	3–2	Coventry City (3)	Walsall
15:00 GMT	Cook 12'; Ginnelly 28'; Devlin 77'	Report	Clarke-Harris 33'; Thomas 56'	Stadium: Bescot Stadium; Attendance: 4,760; Referee: Thomas Bramall

10 November 2018	Rochdale (3)	2–1	Gateshead (5)	Rochdale
15:00 GMT	Mellish 21' (o.g.); Henderson 23'	Report	Mellish 49'	Stadium: Spotland Stadium; Attendance: 2,415; Referee: Peter Wright

10 November 2018	Sutton United (5)	0–0	Slough Town (6)	Sutton, London
15:00 GMT		Report		Stadium: Gander Green Lane; Attendance: 1,830; Referee: Sam Purkiss

20 November 2018 Replay	Slough Town (6)	1–1 (a.e.t.) (8–7 p)	Sutton United (5)	Slough
19:45 GMT	Dobson 81'	Report	Beautyman 9'	Stadium: Arbour Park; Attendance: 1,360; Referee: Brett Huxtable
	Penalties
	Stevens (penalty scored); Dobson (penalty scored); Williams (penalty scored); Dunn (penalty scored); Harris (penalty scored); S. Togwell (penalty missed); Turner (penalty scored); Nisbet (penalty scored); Wells (penalty scored)		(penalty scored) Collins; (penalty scored) Eastmond; (penalty scored) Cadogan; (penalty scored) Beautyman; (penalty scored) Clough; (penalty missed) Bolarinwa; (penalty scored) Drinan; (penalty scored) Worner; (penalty missed) Beckwith

10 November 2018	Exeter City (4)	2–3	Blackpool (3)	Exeter
15:00 GMT	Tillson 69'; Abrahams 90'	Report	Dodoo 3'; Cullen 19'; Pritchard 24'	Stadium: St James Park; Attendance: 3,188; Referee: Lee Collins

10 November 2018	Luton Town (3)	2–0	Wycombe Wanderers (3)	Luton
15:00 GMT	Shinnie 41'; Cornick 71'	Report		Stadium: Kenilworth Road; Attendance: 5,343; Referee: Craig Hicks

10 November 2018	Morecambe (4)	0–0	FC Halifax Town (5)	Morecambe
15:00 GMT		Report		Stadium: Globe Arena; Attendance: 1,736; Referee: Darren Drysdale

20 November 2018 Replay	FC Halifax Town (5)	1–0	Morecambe (4)	Halifax
19:45 GMT	King 12'	Report		Stadium: The Shay; Attendance: 1,218; Referee: Martin Coy

10 November 2018	Crewe Alexandra (4)	0–1	Carlisle United (4)	Crewe
15:00 GMT		Report	Devitt 90'	Stadium: Gresty Road; Attendance: 2,467; Referee: Lee Swabey

10 November 2018	Southend United (3)	1–1	Crawley Town (4)	Southend-on-Sea
15:00 GMT	Kightly 9'	Report	White 85' (o.g.)	Stadium: Roots Hall; Attendance: 3,935; Referee: Scott Oldham

20 November 2018 Replay	Crawley Town (4)	2–6 (a.e.t.)	Southend United (3)	Crawley
19:45 GMT	Palmer 55', 68'	Report	Doherty 17' (o.g.); Bunn 31'; Cox 92'; White 97'; Mantom 106'; McLaughlin 114'	Stadium: Broadfield Stadium; Attendance: 3,120; Referee: Charles Breakspear

11 November 2018	Mansfield Town (4)	1–1	Charlton Athletic (3)	Mansfield
12:45 GMT	Hamilton 45'	Report	Stevenson 73'	Stadium: Field Mill; Attendance: 3,204; Referee: Ollie Yates

20 November 2018 Replay	Charlton Athletic (3)	5–0	Mansfield Town (4)	Charlton, London
19:45 GMT	Taylor 11', 52', 85'; Marshall 81'; Ajose 90+1'	Report		Stadium: The Valley; Attendance: 1,910; Referee: Kevin Johnson

11 November 2018	Chorley (6)	2–2	Doncaster Rovers (3)	Chorley
12:45 GMT	O'Keefe 2'; Meppen-Walter 43'	Report	Kane 11', 77'	Stadium: Victory Park; Attendance: 3,239; Referee: Ross Joyce

20 November 2018 Replay	Doncaster Rovers (3)	7–0	Chorley (6)	Doncaster
19:45 GMT	May 7', 30', 36', 81'; Blair 21'; Kane 28'; Marquis 85'	Report		Stadium: Keepmoat Stadium; Attendance: 3,048; Referee: Darren Drysdale

11 November 2018	Alfreton Town (6)	1–4	Fleetwood Town (3)	Alfreton
12:45 GMT	Sinnott 70'	Report	Madden 13', 60' (pen.); Hunter 20'; Garner 90+2'	Stadium: North Street; Attendance: 827; Referee: Christopher Sarginson

11 November 2018	Barnet (5)	1–1	Bristol Rovers (3)	Canons Park, London
12:45 GMT	Robson 16'	Report	Lines 66' (pen.)	Stadium: The Hive Stadium; Attendance: 1,705; Referee: Robert Lewis

21 November 2018 Replay	Bristol Rovers (3)	1–2	Barnet (5)	Horfield, Bristol
19:45 GMT	Nichols 62'	Report	Robson 75'; Harrison 77'	Stadium: Memorial Stadium; Attendance: 2,740; Referee: Lee Swabey

11 November 2018	Shrewsbury Town (3)	1–1	Salford City (5)	Shrewsbury
12:45 GMT	Norburn 25'	Report	Rooney 27'	Stadium: New Meadow; Attendance: 4,351; Referee: Ben Toner

21 November 2018 Replay	Salford City (5)	1–3	Shrewsbury Town (3)	Salford
19:45 GMT	Rooney	Report	Okenabirhie 33', 90+3'; Docherty 63'	Stadium: Moor Lane; Attendance: 2,432; Referee: Seb Stockbridge

11 November 2018	Hitchin Town (7)	0–2	Solihull Moors (5)	Hitchin
12:45 GMT		Report	Yussuf 72' (pen.); Wright 78'	Stadium: Top Field; Attendance: 3,148; Referee: Andrew Miller

11 November 2018	Guiseley (6)	4–3	Cambridge United (4)	Guiseley
12:45 GMT	Hatfield 25'; Moyo 40'; Felix 48'; James 55'	Report	Ibehre 65', 90+2'; Maris 89'	Stadium: Nethermoor Park; Attendance: 1,097; Referee: Trevor Kettle

11 November 2018	Weston-super-Mare (6)	0–2	Wrexham (5)	Weston-super-Mare
12:45 GMT		Report	Summerfield 51'; Beavon 81'	Stadium: Woodspring Stadium; Attendance: 1,170; Referee: Leigh Doughty

11 November 2018	Port Vale (4)	1–2	Sunderland (3)	Burslem, Stoke-on-Trent
14:30 GMT	Pope 35'	Report	Honeyman 1'; Gooch 19'	Stadium: Vale Park; Attendance: 7,238; Referee: Anthony Backhouse

12 November 2018	Hampton & Richmond Borough (6)	1–2	Oldham Athletic (4)	Hampton, London
19:45 GMT	Dickson 15' (pen.)	Report	Hunt 88'; Lang 90+4'	Stadium: Beveree Stadium; Attendance: 2,720; Referee: Tom Nield

== Second round proper ==
The second round draw took place on 12 November. The 40 winners of the first round proper played in 20 second round proper ties on the weekend of 1 December. This round included five teams from Level 6 (Guiseley, Slough Town, Southport, Stockport County and Woking), who were the lowest-ranked teams still in the competition. This round included an all-Welsh tie, Wrexham at home against Newport County, the first such tie in the FA Cup since the latter took on Swansea City in the first round of the 2006–07 tournament.

30 November 2018	Solihull Moors (5)	0–0	Blackpool (3)	Solihull
19:55 GMT		Report		Stadium: Damson Park; Attendance: 3,005; Referee: Ross Joyce

18 December 2018 Replay	Blackpool (3)	3–2 (a.e.t.)	Solihull Moors (5)	Blackpool
19:45 GMT	Gnanduillet 10'; Dodoo 19'; Spearing 105' (pen.)	Report	Yussuf 33', 51' (pen.)	Stadium: Bloomfield Road; Attendance: 1,441; Referee: Andy Haines

1 December 2018	FC Halifax Town (5)	1–3	AFC Wimbledon (3)	Halifax
12:30 GMT	Hanson 86' (o.g.)	Report	Purrington 42'; Wordsworth 73'; Pigott 75'	Stadium: The Shay; Attendance: 2,044; Referee: Ben Toner

1 December 2018	Southend United (3)	2–4	Barnsley (3)	Southend-on-Sea
15:00 GMT	Mantom 45+4'; Dieng 84'	Report	Moore 41'; Woodrow 56', 70'; Bähre 90+5'	Stadium: Roots Hall; Attendance: 3,616; Referee: Paul Marsden

1 December 2018	Peterborough United (3)	2–2	Bradford City (3)	Peterborough
15:00 GMT	Toney 29'; Dembélé 45+1'	Report	Mellor 84'; Colville 89'	Stadium: London Road Stadium; Attendance: 3,750; Referee: Trevor Kettle

11 December 2018 Replay	Bradford City (3)	4–4 (a.e.t.) (2–3 p)	Peterborough United (3)	Bradford
19:45 GMT	Miller 22', 72'; Ball 53'; Caddis 58'	Report	Toney 18', 20', 84'; Maddison 45+4'	Stadium: Valley Parade; Attendance: 3,486; Referee: Ross Joyce
	Penalties
	Doyle (penalty scored); Henry (penalty missed); L. O'Brien (penalty scored); Payne (penalty missed); Caddis (penalty missed)		(penalty scored) Maddison; (penalty missed) Toney; (penalty scored) Godden; (penalty scored) Walker

1 December 2018	Maidstone United (5)	0–2	Oldham Athletic (4)	Maidstone
15:00 GMT		Report	Clarke 17'; O'Grady 84'	Stadium: Gallagher Stadium; Attendance: 3,560; Referee: Alan Young

1 December 2018	Lincoln City (4)	2–0	Carlisle United (4)	Lincoln
15:00 GMT	Rhead 1'; Akinde 86'	Report		Stadium: Sincil Bank; Attendance: 6,438; Referee: Dean Whitestone

1 December 2018	Plymouth Argyle (3)	1–2	Oxford United (3)	Plymouth
15:00 GMT	Sarcevic 67'	Report	Henry 49'; Brannagan 53'	Stadium: Home Park; Attendance: 5,984; Referee: Peter Wright

1 December 2018	Walsall (3)	1–1	Sunderland (3)	Walsall
15:00 GMT	Cook 53'	Report	McGeady 37'	Stadium: Bescot Stadium; Attendance: 3,140; Referee: Carl Boyeson

11 December 2018 Replay	Sunderland (3)	0–1	Walsall (3)	Sunderland
19:45 GMT		Report	Kinsella 52'	Stadium: Stadium of Light; Attendance: 8,212; Referee: Michael Salisbury

1 December 2018	Accrington Stanley (3)	3–1	Cheltenham Town (4)	Accrington
15:00 GMT	Zanzala 49'; Kee 66' (pen.); Clark 78'	Report	Addai 73'	Stadium: Crown Ground; Attendance: 1,006; Referee: Andy Haines

1 December 2018	Charlton Athletic (3)	0–2	Doncaster Rovers (3)	Charlton
15:00 GMT		Report	Butler 66'; Marquis 77'	Stadium: The Valley; Attendance: 3,249; Referee: Brett Huxtable

1 December 2018	Wrexham (5)	0–0	Newport County (4)	Wrexham
20:00 GMT		Report		Stadium: Racecourse Ground; Attendance: 5,295; Referee: Craig Hicks

11 December 2018 Replay	Newport County (4)	4–0	Wrexham (5)	Newport
19:45 GMT	Amond 49'; Matt 59'; Carrington 65' (o.g.); Butler 90+1'	Report		Stadium: Rodney Parade; Attendance: 4,143; Referee: Kevin Johnson

2 December 2018	Bury (4)	0–1	Luton Town (3)	Bury
14:00 GMT		Report	Cornick 42'	Stadium: Gigg Lane; Attendance: 2,977; Referee: Thomas Bramall

2 December 2018	Tranmere Rovers (4)	1–1	Southport (6)	Birkenhead
14:00 GMT	Smith 18'	Report	Bauress 70'	Stadium: Prenton Park; Attendance: 4,701; Referee: Anthony Backhouse

17 December 2018 Replay	Southport (6)	0–2	Tranmere Rovers (4)	Southport
19:45 GMT		Report	Jennings 14', 43'	Stadium: Haig Avenue; Attendance: 5,414; Referee: Thomas Bramall

2 December 2018	Shrewsbury Town (3)	1–0	Scunthorpe United (3)	Shrewsbury
14:00 GMT	Amadi-Holloway 35'	Report		Stadium: New Meadow; Attendance: 3,427; Referee: Ben Toner

2 December 2018	Chesterfield (5)	0–2	Grimsby Town (4)	Chesterfield
14:00 GMT		Report	Vernam 37'; Clifton 70'	Stadium: Proact Stadium; Attendance: 4,537; Referee: Michael Salisbury

2 December 2018	Swindon Town (4)	0–1	Woking (6)	Swindon
14:00 GMT		Report	Hyde 54'	Stadium: County Ground; Attendance: 3,654; Referee: Matthew Donohue

2 December 2018	Barnet (5)	1–0	Stockport County (6)	Canons Park, London
14:00 GMT	Sparkes 8'	Report		Stadium: The Hive Stadium; Attendance: 2,826; Referee: Scott Oldham

2 December 2018	Rochdale (3)	0–1	Portsmouth (3)	Rochdale
14:00 GMT		Report	Green 90'	Stadium: Spotland Stadium; Attendance: 2,555; Referee: Sebastian Stockbridge

2 December 2018	Slough Town (6)	0–1	Gillingham (3)	Slough
14:00 GMT		Report	Oldaker 48'	Stadium: Arbour Park; Attendance: 2,084; Referee: Christopher Sarginson

3 December 2018	Guiseley (6)	1–2	Fleetwood Town (3)	Guiseley
20:00 GMT	Purver 33'	Report	Madden 28'; Burns 31'	Stadium: Nethermoor Park; Attendance: 2,324; Referee: John Busby

== Third round proper ==
The third round draw took place on 3 December 2018 and was broadcast live on BBC One and BT Sport before the final second round tie between Guiseley and Fleetwood Town. All 32 third round proper ties took place on the weekend of 4–7 January 2019. A total of 64 clubs played in the third round; 20 winners of the second round, and 44 teams from the Premier League and EFL Championship entering in this round. This round included one team from Level 6, Woking, the lowest-ranked team still in the competition.

The scheduling for the third round was controversial, due to the number of games scheduled outside the traditional kick-off slot of 15:00 GMT on Saturday. Only 10 of 32 third round proper matches kicked off at that time. This was a result of the FA signing a new overseas television deal in October 2016, which came into force this season. The new contract caused a number of matches to be moved to other time-slots to accommodate viewers outside the UK.

4 January 2019	Tranmere Rovers (4)	0–7	Tottenham Hotspur (1)	Birkenhead
19:45 GMT		Report	Aurier 40', 55'; Llorente 48', 71', 72'; Son Heung-min 57'; Kane 82'	Stadium: Prenton Park; Attendance: 12,553; Referee: Andre Marriner

5 January 2019	Sheffield Wednesday (2)	0–0	Luton Town (3)	Sheffield
12:30 GMT		Report		Stadium: Hillsborough; Attendance: 16,974; Referee: Robert Jones

15 January 2019 Replay	Luton Town (3)	0–1	Sheffield Wednesday (2)	Luton
19:45 GMT		Report	Nuhiu 46'	Stadium: Kenilworth Road; Attendance: 9,259; Referee: Tim Robinson

5 January 2019	Manchester United (1)	2–0	Reading (2)	Manchester
12:30 GMT	Mata 22' (pen.); Lukaku 45+4'	Report		Stadium: Old Trafford; Attendance: 73,918; Referee: Stuart Attwell

5 January 2019	Shrewsbury Town (3)	1–1	Stoke City (2)	Shrewsbury
12:30 GMT	Norburn 45+4' (pen.)	Report	Crouch 78'	Stadium: New Meadow; Attendance: 7,512; Referee: David Webb

15 January 2019 Replay	Stoke City (2)	2–3	Shrewsbury Town (3)	Stoke-on-Trent
20:00 GMT	Campbell 20', 36'	Report	Bolton 71'; Okenabirhie 77' (pen.); Laurent 81'	Stadium: bet365 Attendance: 10,261; Referee: Geoff Eltringham

5 January 2019	Bournemouth (1)	1–3	Brighton & Hove Albion (1)	Bournemouth
12:30 GMT	Pugh 55'	Report	Knockaert 31'; Bissouma 34'; Andone 64'	Stadium: Dean Court; Attendance: 10,522; Referee: Michael Oliver

5 January 2019	West Ham United (1)	2–0	Birmingham City (2)	Stratford, London
12:30 GMT	Arnautović 2'; Carroll 90+1'	Report		Stadium: London Stadium; Attendance: 54,840; Referee: Roger East

5 January 2019	Burnley (1)	1–0	Barnsley (3)	Burnley
12:30 GMT	Wood 90+2' (pen.)	Report		Stadium: Turf Moor; Attendance: 11,053; Referee: Simon Hooper

5 January 2019	West Bromwich Albion (2)	1–0	Wigan Athletic (2)	West Bromwich
12:30 GMT	Sako 31'	Report		Stadium: The Hawthorns; Attendance: 15,465; Referee: Keith Stroud

5 January 2019	Bolton Wanderers (2)	5–2	Walsall (3)	Bolton
15:00 GMT	Donaldson 58'; Magennis 61', 80', 87'; Guthrie 63' (o.g.)	Report	Cook 19'; Beevers 68' (o.g.)	Stadium: University of Bolton Stadium; Attendance: 5,506; Referee: Darren England

5 January 2019	Gillingham (3)	1–0	Cardiff City (1)	Gillingham
15:00 GMT	List 81'	Report		Stadium: Priestfield Stadium; Attendance: 7,090; Referee: Tim Robinson

5 January 2019	Brentford (2)	1–0	Oxford United (3)	Brentford, London
15:00 GMT	Maupay 80' (pen.)	Report		Stadium: Griffin Park; Attendance: 6,106; Referee: Jeremy Simpson

5 January 2019	Everton (1)	2–1	Lincoln City (4)	Liverpool
15:00 GMT	Lookman 12'; Bernard 14'	Report	Bostwick 28'	Stadium: Goodison Park; Attendance: 37,900; Referee: John Brooks

5 January 2019	Chelsea (1)	2–0	Nottingham Forest (2)	Fulham, London
15:00 GMT	Morata 49', 59'	Report		Stadium: Stamford Bridge; Attendance: 40,544; Referee: Andy Madley

5 January 2019	Derby County (2)	2–2	Southampton (1)	Derby
15:00 GMT	Marriott 58'; Lawrence 61'	Report	Redmond 4', 48'	Stadium: Pride Park Stadium; Attendance: 17,095; Referee: Oliver Langford

16 January 2019 Replay	Southampton (1)	2–2 (a.e.t.) (3–5 p)	Derby County (2)	Southampton
	Armstrong 68'; Redmond 70'	Report	Wilson 76'; Waghorn 82'	Stadium: St Mary's; Attendance: 14,651; Referee: Anthony Taylor
	Penalties
	Ward-Prowse (penalty scored); Redmond (penalty missed); Vestergaard (penalty scored); Targett (penalty scored)		(penalty scored) Waghorn; (penalty scored) Nugent; (penalty scored) Mount; (penalty scored) Lawrence; (penalty scored) Keogh

5 January 2019	Accrington Stanley (3)	1–0	Ipswich Town (2)	Accrington
15:00 GMT	Kee 76'	Report		Stadium: Crown Ground; Attendance: 2,869; Referee: Dean Whitestone

5 January 2019	Fleetwood Town (3)	2–3	AFC Wimbledon (3)	Fleetwood
15:00 GMT	Madden 70'; Evans 72' (pen.)	Report	Barcham 16'; Hartigan 55'; Appiah 89'	Stadium: Highbury Stadium; Attendance: 2,131; Referee: Ross Joyce

5 January 2019	Middlesbrough (2)	5–0	Peterborough United (3)	Middlesbrough
15:00 GMT	Assombalonga 47'; Friend 50'; Wing 62', 70'; Fletcher 87'	Report		Stadium: Riverside Stadium; Attendance: 11,647; Referee: James Linington

5 January 2019	Aston Villa (2)	0–3	Swansea City (2)	Birmingham
15:00 GMT		Report	Baker-Richardson 2'; Dyer 47'; Fulton 78'	Stadium: Villa Park; Attendance: 30,572; Referee: Gavin Ward

5 January 2019	Newcastle United (1)	1–1	Blackburn Rovers (2)	Newcastle upon Tyne
17:30 GMT	Ritchie 84' (pen.)	Report	Dack 56'	Stadium: St James' Park; Attendance: 36,440; Referee: Kevin Friend

15 January 2019 Replay	Blackburn Rovers (2)	2–4 (a.e.t.)	Newcastle United (1)	Blackburn
19:45 GMT	Armstrong 33'; Lenihan 45+1'	Report	Longstaff 1'; Roberts 22'; Joselu 105+3'; Pérez 106'	Stadium: Ewood Park; Attendance: 14,228; Referee: Lee Probert

5 January 2019	Crystal Palace (1)	1–0	Grimsby Town (4)	Selhurst, London
17:30 GMT	J. Ayew 87'	Report		Stadium: Selhurst Park; Attendance: 19,967; Referee: Martin Atkinson

5 January 2019	Bristol City (2)	1–0	Huddersfield Town (1)	Bristol
17:30 GMT	Brownhill 72'	Report		Stadium: Ashton Gate; Attendance: 12,179; Referee: Peter Bankes

5 January 2019	Blackpool (3)	0–3	Arsenal (1)	Blackpool
17:30 GMT		Report	Willock 11', 37'; Iwobi 82'	Stadium: Bloomfield Road; Attendance: 8,955; Referee: Mike Dean

5 January 2019	Norwich City (2)	0–1	Portsmouth (3)	Norwich
17:30 GMT		Report	Green 90+4'	Stadium: Carrow Road; Attendance: 23,201; Referee: Darren Bond

6 January 2019	Millwall (2)	2–1	Hull City (2)	Bermondsey, London
14:00 GMT	Ferguson 82', 85'	Report	Toral 52'	Stadium: The Den; Attendance: 5,307; Referee: Andy Woolmer

6 January 2019	Preston North End (2)	1–3	Doncaster Rovers (3)	Preston
14:00 GMT	Hughes 56'	Report	Marquis 5'; Anderson 72'; Wilks 87'	Stadium: Deepdale; Attendance: 8,101; Referee: Andy Davies

6 January 2019	Fulham (1)	1–2	Oldham Athletic (4)	Fulham, London
14:00 GMT	Odoi 52'	Report	Surridge 76' (pen.); Lang 88'	Stadium: Craven Cottage; Attendance: 16,134; Referee: Anthony Taylor

6 January 2019	Manchester City (1)	7–0	Rotherham United (2)	Manchester
14:00 GMT	Sterling 12'; Foden 43'; Ajayi 45+1' (o.g.); Gabriel Jesus 52'; Mahrez 73'; Otamendi 78'; Sané 85'	Report		Stadium: City of Manchester Stadium; Attendance: 52,708; Referee: David Coote

6 January 2019	Woking (6)	0–2	Watford (1)	Woking
14:00 GMT		Report	Hughes 13'; Deeney 74'	Stadium: Kingfield Stadium; Attendance: 5,717; Referee: Graham Scott

6 January 2019	Queens Park Rangers (2)	2–1	Leeds United (2)	Shepherd's Bush, London
14:00 GMT	Oteh 23' (pen.); Bidwell 75'	Report	Halme 25'	Stadium: Loftus Road; Attendance: 11,637; Referee: Geoff Eltringham

6 January 2019	Sheffield United (2)	0–1	Barnet (5)	Sheffield
14:00 GMT		Report	Coulthirst 21' (pen.)	Stadium: Bramall Lane; Attendance: 9,906; Referee: Tony Harrington

6 January 2019	Newport County (4)	2–1	Leicester City (1)	Newport
16:30 GMT	Matt 10'; Amond 85' (pen.)	Report	Ghezzal 82'	Stadium: Rodney Parade; Attendance: 6,705; Referee: Chris Kavanagh

7 January 2019	Wolverhampton Wanderers (1)	2–1	Liverpool (1)	Wolverhampton
19:45 GMT	Jiménez 38'; Neves 55'	Report	Origi 51'	Stadium: Molineux Stadium; Attendance: 25,849; Referee: Paul Tierney

== Fourth round proper ==
The draw for the fourth round took place on 7 January following the Wolverhampton Wanderers-Liverpool game. It was shown on BBC and was conducted by Carl Ikeme and Robbie Keane. All 16 fourth round ties were played on the weekend of 25–28 January 2019. This round included one team from Level 5, Barnet, the lowest ranking and only non-League side left in the competition.

25 January 2019	Bristol City (2)	2–1	Bolton Wanderers (2)	Bristol
19:45 GMT	O'Dowda 8'; Eliasson 30'	Report	Beevers 6'	Stadium: Ashton Gate; Attendance: 13,747; Referee: Stuart Attwell

25 January 2019	Arsenal (1)	1–3	Manchester United (1)	Holloway, London
19:55 GMT	Aubameyang 43'	Report	Sánchez 31'; Lingard 33'; Martial 82'	Stadium: Emirates Stadium; Attendance: 59,571; Referee: Craig Pawson

26 January 2019	Accrington Stanley (3)	0–1	Derby County (2)	Accrington
12:30 GMT		Report	Waghorn 78'	Stadium: Crown Ground; Attendance: 5,397; Referee: Jon Moss

26 January 2019	Manchester City (1)	5–0	Burnley (1)	Manchester
15:00 GMT	Gabriel Jesus 23'; B. Silva 52'; De Bruyne 61'; Long 73' (o.g.); Agüero 85' (pen.)	Report		Stadium: City of Manchester Stadium; Attendance: 50,121; Referee: Graham Scott

26 January 2019	Newcastle United (1)	0–2	Watford (1)	Newcastle upon Tyne
15:00 GMT		Report	Gray 61'; Success 90'	Stadium: St James' Park; Attendance: 34,604; Referee: David Coote

26 January 2019	Brighton & Hove Albion (1)	0–0	West Bromwich Albion (2)	Brighton and Hove
15:00 GMT		Report		Stadium: Falmer Stadium; Attendance: 20,001; Referee: Lee Mason

6 February 2019 Replay	West Bromwich Albion (2)	1–3 (a.e.t.)	Brighton & Hove Albion (1)	West Bromwich
20:05 GMT	Bartley 77'	Report	Andone 82'; Murray 104', 117'	Stadium: The Hawthorns; Attendance: 8,645; Referee: Paul Tierney

26 January 2019	Swansea City (2)	4–1	Gillingham (3)	Swansea
15:00 GMT	McBurnie 10', 32'; Celina 73'; McKay 84'	Report	Rees 51'	Stadium: Liberty Stadium; Attendance: 15,080; Referee: Darren England

26 January 2019	Middlesbrough (2)	1–1	Newport County (4)	Middlesbrough
15:00 GMT	Ayala 51'	Report	Dolan 90+3'	Stadium: Riverside Stadium; Attendance: 15,794; Referee: John Brooks

5 February 2019 Replay	Newport County (4)	2–0	Middlesbrough (2)	Newport
19:45 GMT	Willmott 47'; Amond 67'	Report		Stadium: Rodney Parade; Attendance: 6,552; Referee: Stuart Attwell

26 January 2019	Shrewsbury Town (3)	2–2	Wolverhampton Wanderers (1)	Shrewsbury
15:00 GMT	Docherty 47'; Waterfall 71'	Report	Jiménez 75'; Doherty 90+3'	Stadium: New Meadow; Attendance: 9,503; Referee: Roger East

5 February 2019 Replay	Wolverhampton Wanderers (1)	3–2	Shrewsbury Town (3)	Wolverhampton
19:45 GMT	Doherty 2', 45+6'; Cavaleiro 62'	Report	Bolton 11'; Laurent 39'	Stadium: Molineux Stadium; Attendance: 28,844; Referee: Lee Probert

26 January 2019	Portsmouth (3)	1–1	Queens Park Rangers (2)	Portsmouth
15:00 GMT	Brown 63'	Report	Wells 74'	Stadium: Fratton Park; Attendance: 19,378; Referee: Gavin Ward

5 February 2019 Replay	Queens Park Rangers (2)	2–0	Portsmouth (3)	Shepherd's Bush, London
19:45 GMT	Wells 70'; Smith 77'	Report		Stadium: Loftus Road; Attendance: 13,115; Referee: David Coote

26 January 2019	Doncaster Rovers (3)	2–1	Oldham Athletic (4)	Doncaster
15:00 GMT	Whiteman 68', 90' (pen.)	Report	Clarke 84'	Stadium: Keepmoat Stadium; Attendance: 11,260; Referee: Peter Bankes

26 January 2019	Millwall (2)	3–2	Everton (1)	Bermondsey, London
17:30 GMT	Gregory 45+2'; Cooper 75'; M. Wallace 90+4'	Report	Richarlison 43'; Tosun 72'	Stadium: The Den; Attendance: 16,354; Referee: Michael Oliver

26 January 2019	AFC Wimbledon (3)	4–2	West Ham United (1)	Norbiton, London
19:45 GMT	Appiah 34'; Wagstaff 41', 46'; Sibbick 88'	Report	Pérez 57'; Felipe Anderson 71'	Stadium: Kingsmeadow; Attendance: 4,777; Referee: Anthony Taylor

27 January 2019	Crystal Palace (1)	2–0	Tottenham Hotspur (1)	Selhurst, London
16:00 GMT	Wickham 9'; Townsend 34' (pen.)	Report		Stadium: Selhurst Park; Attendance: 19,491; Referee: Kevin Friend

27 January 2019	Chelsea (1)	3–0	Sheffield Wednesday (2)	Fulham, London
18:00 GMT	Willian 26' (pen.), 83'; Hudson-Odoi 65'	Report		Stadium: Stamford Bridge; Attendance: 37,433; Referee: Andre Marriner

28 January 2019	Barnet (5)	3–3	Brentford (2)	Canons Park, London
19:45 GMT	Coulthirst 50', 53'; Sparkes 75'	Report	Watkins 40'; Maupay 60' (pen.); Canós 72'	Stadium: The Hive Stadium; Attendance: 6,215; Referee: Andrew Madley

5 February 2019 Replay	Brentford (2)	3–1	Barnet (5)	Brentford, London
19:45 GMT	Canós 7'; Jeanvier 32'; Maupay 71'	Report	Tutonda 74'	Stadium: Griffin Park; Attendance: 6,954; Referee: Roger East

== Fifth round proper ==
The draw for the fifth round took place on 28 January 2019. Matches were played on the weekend of 15–18 February 2019. This round included one team from Level 4, Newport County, the lowest ranking side left in the competition. As of this season, extra time and penalties replaced replays as the method for resolving a drawn tie.

15 February 2019	Queens Park Rangers (2)	0–1	Watford (1)	Shepherd's Bush, London
19:45		Report	Capoue 45+1'	Stadium: Loftus Road; Attendance: 17,212; Referee: Michael Oliver

16 February 2019	Brighton & Hove Albion (1)	2–1	Derby County (2)	Brighton and Hove
12:30	Knockaert 33'; Locadia 45+2'	Report	Cole 81'	Stadium: Falmer Stadium; Attendance: 24,562; Referee: David Coote

16 February 2019	AFC Wimbledon (3)	0–1	Millwall (2)	Norbiton, London
15:00		Report	M. Wallace 5'	Stadium: Kingsmeadow; Attendance: 4,795; Referee: Jon Moss

16 February 2019	Newport County (4)	1–4	Manchester City (1)	Newport
17:30	Amond 88'	Report	Sané 51'; Foden 75', 89'; Mahrez 90+4'	Stadium: Rodney Parade; Attendance: 9,680; Referee: Andre Marriner

17 February 2019	Bristol City (2)	0–1	Wolverhampton Wanderers (1)	Bristol
13:00	(1)	Report	Cavaleiro 28'	Stadium: Ashton Gate; Attendance: 24,394; Referee: Martin Atkinson

17 February 2019	Doncaster Rovers (3)	0–2	Crystal Palace (1)	Doncaster
16:00		Report	Schlupp 8'; Meyer 45+2'	Stadium: Keepmoat Stadium; Attendance: 14,010; Referee: Mike Dean

17 February 2019	Swansea City (2)	4–1	Brentford (2)	Swansea
16:00	Daniels 49' (o.g.); James 53'; Celina 66'; Byers 90'	Report	Watkins 28'	Stadium: Liberty Stadium; Attendance: 11,261; Referee: Stuart Attwell

18 February 2019	Chelsea (1)	0–2	Manchester United (1)	Fulham, London
19:30		Report	Herrera 31'; Pogba 45'	Stadium: Stamford Bridge; Attendance: 40,562; Referee: Kevin Friend

== Quarter-finals ==
The draw for the quarter-finals took place on 18 February 2019. Matches were played on the weekend of 16–17 March 2019. This round included two teams from Level 2, Millwall and Swansea City, the lowest ranking sides left in the competition.

16 March 2019	Watford (1)	2–1	Crystal Palace (1)	Watford
12:15 GMT	Capoue 27'; Gray 79'	Report	Batshuayi 62'	Stadium: Vicarage Road; Attendance: 18,104; Referee: Kevin Friend

16 March 2019	Swansea City (2)	2–3	Manchester City (1)	Swansea
17:20 GMT	Grimes 20' (pen.); Celina 29'	Report	B. Silva 69'; Nordfeldt 78' (o.g.); Agüero 88'	Stadium: Liberty Stadium; Attendance: 20,498; Referee: Andre Marriner

16 March 2019	Wolverhampton Wanderers (1)	2–1	Manchester United (1)	Wolverhampton
19:55 GMT	Jiménez 70'; Jota 76'	Report	Rashford 90+5'	Stadium: Molineux Stadium; Attendance: 31,004; Referee: Martin Atkinson

17 March 2019	Millwall (2)	2–2 (a.e.t.) (4–5 p)	Brighton & Hove Albion (1)	Bermondsey, London
14:00 GMT	Pearce 70'; O'Brien 79'	Report	Locadia 88'; March 90+5'	Stadium: The Den; Attendance: 17,137; Referee: Chris Kavanagh
	Penalties
	Williams (penalty scored); Tunnicliffe (penalty scored); Leonard (penalty scored); Romeo (penalty missed); Morison (penalty scored); Cooper (penalty missed)		(penalty missed) Murray; (penalty scored) Locadia; (penalty scored) March; (penalty scored) Pröpper; (penalty scored) Stephens; (penalty scored) Dunk

== Semi-finals ==
The draw for the semi-finals took place on 17 March 2019.

6 April 2019	Manchester City (1)	1–0	Brighton & Hove Albion (1)	Wembley, London
17:30	Gabriel Jesus 4'	Report		Stadium: Wembley Stadium; Attendance: 71,521; Referee: Anthony Taylor

7 April 2019	Watford (1)	3–2 (a.e.t.)	Wolverhampton Wanderers (1)	Wembley, London
16:00	Deulofeu 79', 104'; Deeney 90+4' (pen.)	Report	Doherty 36'; Jiménez 62'	Stadium: Wembley Stadium; Attendance: 80,092; Referee: Michael Oliver

== Final ==
The final was played on 18 May 2019 at Wembley Stadium, London.

18 May 2019
17:00 BST

Manchester City	6–0	Watford
D. Silva 26'; Gabriel Jesus 38', 68'; De Bruyne 61'; Sterling 81', 87'

Wembley Stadium, London
Attendance: 85,854
Referee: Kevin Friend (Leicestershire)

== Top scorers ==
Rank	Player	Club	Goals
1	(Republic of Ireland) Padraig Amond	Newport County	5
1	(Brazil) Gabriel Jesus	Manchester City	5
3	(Republic of Ireland) Matt Doherty	Wolverhampton Wanderers	4
3	(England) Connor Jennings	Tranmere Rovers	4
3	(Mexico) Raúl Jiménez	Wolverhampton Wanderers	4
3	(Republic of Ireland) Paddy Madden	Fleetwood Town	4
3	(England) Alfie May	Doncaster Rovers	4
3	(England) Ivan Toney	Peterborough United	4
9	18 players		3

== Broadcasting rights ==
The domestic broadcasting rights for the competition were held by the BBC and subscription channel BT Sport. The BBC held the rights since 2014–15, while BT Sport since 2013–14. The FA Cup Final was required to be broadcast live on UK terrestrial television under the Ofcom code of protected sporting events.

The following matches were broadcast live on UK television:

Round	Date	Teams	Kick-off	Channels	
Round	Date	Teams	Kick-off	Digital	TV
First round	9 November	Haringey Borough v AFC Wimbledon	7:55pm	BBC iPlayer	BBC Two
First round	10 November	Maidenhead United v Portsmouth	12:30pm	BT Sport App	BT Sport 1
First round	11 November	Port Vale v Sunderland	2:30pm	BT Sport App	BT Sport 1
First round	12 November	Hampton & Richmond Borough v Oldham Athletic	7:45pm	BT Sport App	BT Sport 1
First round (Replay)	20 November	Oxford City v Tranmere Rovers	7:45pm	BT Sport App	BT Sport 1
First round (Replay)	21 November	Salford City v Shrewsbury Town	7:45pm	BT Sport App	BT Sport 1
Second round	30 November	Solihull Moors v Blackpool	4:00pm	BBC iPlayer	BBC Two
Second round	1 December	F.C. Halifax Town v AFC Wimbledon	12:30pm	BT Sport App	BT Sport 1
Second round	2 December	Wrexham v Newport County	8:00pm	BT Sport App	BT Sport 1
Second round	3 December	Guiseley v Fleetwood Town	8:00pm	BT Sport App	BT Sport 1
Second round (Replay)	17 December	Southport v Tranmere Rovers	7:45pm	BT Sport App	BT Sport 1
Second round (Replay)	18 December	Blackpool v Solihull Moors	7:45pm	BT Sport App	BT Sport 1
Third round	4 January	Tranmere Rovers v Tottenham Hotspur	7:45pm	BT Sport App	BT Sport 2
Third round	5 January	Manchester United v Reading	12:30pm	BT Sport App	BT Sport 2
Third round	5 January	Blackpool v Arsenal	5:30pm	BT Sport App	BT Sport 2
Third round	6 January	Woking v Watford	2:00pm	BT Sport App	BT Sport 2
Third round	6 January	Newport County v Leicester City	4:30pm	BBC iPlayer	BBC One
Third round	7 January	Wolverhampton Wanderers v Liverpool	7:45pm	BBC iPlayer	BBC One
Third round (Replay)	15 January	Blackburn Rovers v Newcastle United	7:45pm	BT Sport App	BT Sport 1
Third round (Replay)	16 January	Southampton v Derby County	8:05pm	BBC iPlayer	BBC One
Fourth round	25 January	Arsenal v Manchester United	7:55pm	BBC iPlayer	BBC One
Fourth round	26 January	Accrington Stanley v Derby County	12:30pm	BT Sport App	BT Sport 2
Fourth round	26 January	Millwall v Everton	5:30pm	BBC iPlayer	BBC One
Fourth round	26 January	AFC Wimbledon v West Ham United	7:45pm	BT Sport App	BT Sport 2
Fourth round	27 January	Crystal Palace v Tottenham Hotspur	4:00pm	BT Sport App	BT Sport 2
Fourth round	27 January	Chelsea v Sheffield Wednesday	6:00pm	BBC iPlayer	BBC One
Fourth round	28 January	Barnet v Brentford	7:45pm	BT Sport App	BT Sport 2
Fourth round (Replay)	5 February	Newport County v Middlesbrough	7:45pm	BT Sport App	BT Sport 1
Fourth round (Replay)	6 February	West Bromwich Albion v Brighton & Hove Albion	8:05pm	BBC iPlayer	BBC One
Fifth round	15 February	Queens Park Rangers v Watford	7:45pm	BT Sport App	BT Sport 2
Fifth round	16 February	Brighton & Hove Albion v Derby County	12:30pm	BT Sport App	BT Sport 2
Fifth round	16 February	Newport County v Manchester City	5:30pm	BT Sport App	BT Sport 2
Fifth round	17 February	Bristol City v Wolverhampton Wanderers	1:00pm	BT Sport App	BT Sport 2
Fifth round	17 February	Swansea City v Brentford	4:00pm	BBC iPlayer	BBC One Wales
Fifth round	17 February	Doncaster Rovers v Crystal Palace	4:00pm	BBC iPlayer	BBC One
Fifth round	18 February	Chelsea v Manchester United	7:30pm	BBC iPlayer	BBC One
Quarter-finals	16 March	Watford v Crystal Palace	12:15pm	BT Sport App	BT Sport 2
Quarter-finals	16 March	Swansea City v Manchester City	5:20pm	BT Sport App	BT Sport 2
Quarter-finals	16 March	Wolverhampton Wanderers v Manchester United	7:55pm	BBC iPlayer	BBC One
Quarter-finals	17 March	Millwall v Brighton & Hove Albion	5:30pm	BBC iPlayer	BBC One
Semi finals	6 April	Manchester City v Brighton	5:30pm	BBC iPlayer	BBC One
Semi finals	7 April	Watford v Wolverhampton Wanderers	4:00pm	BT Sport App	BT Sport 2
Final	18 May	Manchester City v Watford	5:00pm	BBC iPlayer	BBC One
Final	18 May	Manchester City v Watford	5:00pm	BT Sport App	BT Sport 2
