= Simone Fautario =

Italian footballer

Personal information
- Date of birth: 12 February 1987 (age 39)
- Place of birth: Milan, Italy
- Height: 1.80 m (5 ft 11 in)
- Position: Left-back

Team information
- Current team: Inter Milan (Under-15 coach)
- Number: 28

Youth career
- Nuovo Calcio Milano
- 1998–2007: Internazionale

Senior career*
| Years | Team | Apps | (Gls) |
| 2006–2009 | Internazionale | 0 | (0) |
| 2007–2008 | → Pro Sesto (loan) | 3 | (0) |
| 2008–2009 | → Pistoiese (loan) | 29 | (0) |
| 2009–2010 | Grosseto | 9 | (0) |
| 2010–2015 | Como | 79 | (1) |
| 2011–2012 | → Frosinone (loan) | 15 | (0) |
| 2015–2017 | Pisa | 22 | (0) |
| 2017 | Modena | 13 | (0) |
| 2017–2018 | Fano | 9 | (0) |
- * Club domestic league appearances and goals as of 20 February 2018

Simone Fautario (born 12 February 1987) is an Italian football and former left-back, currently in charge of the Under-18 team of Inter Milan.

== Career ==
He joined Inter since 1998 from U.S. Nuovo Calcio Milano. He played a few pre-season friendly matches and made his first team debut against Messina on 29 November 2006, a Coppa Italia match.

He spent the 2007–08 season on loan to Serie C1 clubs Pro Sesto (from September to December) and Pistoiese (from January to June). In July 2008, Inter confirmed to have extended his loan to Pistoiese, also announcing the Tuscan club have an option to make the deal permanent. On July 13, 2009, Internazionale confirmed that Fautario would spend the 2009–10 season with Serie B club Grosseto on a co-ownership deal, for a peppercorn fee of €500.

In June 2010, Inter repurchased him and re-sold him to Calcio Como in another co-ownership deal for €500. He played first three matches as starting left back (2 Coppa Italia and one at domestic league), however after sent off in the league, he was put on the bench, as Rosario Licata's backup. That season, he only made ten starts in the league.

On 26 August 2011 he left for Frosinone as part of the deal that Diogo Tavares moved to opposite direction.

== Coaching career ==
After retirement, Fautario joined Inter Milan as part of their youth coaching staff, first as a collaborator, then being named in charge of the Under-15 team in 2022. On 1 August 2024, Fautario was confirmed as the new Under-15 coach of Inter Milan. In this season he won the Under-15 final against Fiorentina.
