= Alessandro Fiordaliso =

Italian football player (born 1999)

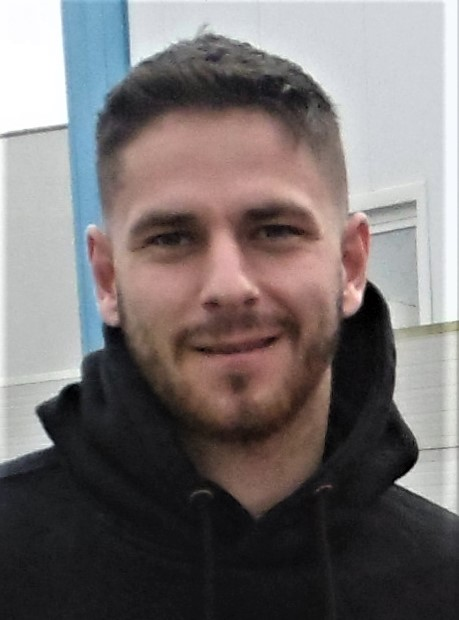

Personal information
- Date of birth: 20 March 1999 (age 27)
- Place of birth: Turin, Italy
- Height: 1.84 m (6 ft 0 in)
- Position: Defender

Team information
- Current team: Bra
- Number: 17

Youth career
- –2018: Torino

Senior career*
Years	Team	Apps	(Gls)
2017–2020	Torino	0	(0)
2018–2019	→ Teramo (loan)	34	(3)
2019–2020	→ Venezia (loan)	26	(0)
2020–2022	Cremonese	23	(0)
2022–2025	SPAL	49	(1)
2025–	Bra	22	(1)
- * Club domestic league appearances and goals as of 30 April 2026

Alessandro Fiordaliso (born 20 March 1999) is an Italian professional footballer who plays as a defender for Serie D club Bra.

== Club career ==
=== Torino ===
He made his first appearance on the bench for the main squad of Torino on 11 December 2017 in a Serie A game against Lazio.

==== Loan to Teramo ====
On 30 August 2018, Fiordaliso was loaned to Serie C club Teramo on a season-long loan deal. He made his professional debut in Serie C for Teramo on 23 September in a 0–0 home draw against Sambenedettese, he played the entire match. On 27 December he scored his first professional goal in the 62nd minute of a 2–1 away defeat against Ternana. On 9 February 2019, Fiordaliso scored his second goal for the club and the winning goal in the 45th minute of a 1–0 home win over Rimini. On 28 April he scored his third goal in the 28th minute of a 3–2 away defeat against Triestina. Fiordaliso ended his loan to Teramo with 34 appearances, 33 of them as a starter, and 3 goals.

==== Loan to Venezia ====
On 24 July 2019, Fiordaliso was signed by Serie B side Venezia on a season-long loan. Three weeks later, on 11 August, he made his debut for Venezia in a 2–1 home win over Catania in the second round of Coppa Italia, he played the entire match. Two more weeks later, on 24 August he made his Serie B debut for the club in a 2–1 home defeat against Cremonese, he played the entire match. Fiordaliso ended his season-long loan to Venezia with 28 appearances, including 23 of them as a starter, and he remained an unused substitute 9 times, he also made one assist for the club during the season, in December 2019, in the last minute of a 2–2 away draw against Pescara.

=== Cremonese ===
On 25 September 2020, Fiordaliso joined Serie B club Cremonese on a permanent deal.

=== SPAL ===
On 31 August 2022, Fiordaliso signed a three-year contract with SPAL.

== Career statistics ==
=== Club ===
As of 20 September 2020

Club	Season	League			Cup		Europe		Other		Total	
Club	Season	League	Apps	Goals	Apps	Goals	Apps	Goals	Apps	Goals	Apps	Goals
Teramo (loan)	2018–19	Serie C	34	3	0	0	—		—		34	3
Venezia (loan)	2019–20	Serie B	26	0	2	0	—		—		28	0
Career total			60	3	2	0	—		—		62	3

== Honours ==
=== Club ===
Torino Primavera

- Coppa Italia Primavera: 2017–18
