= Davis Curiale =

Italian association footballer (born 1987)

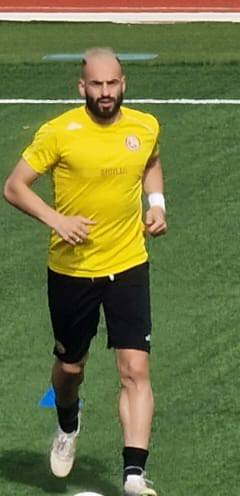
- Curiale with the Sicily national football team in 2023

Personal information
- Date of birth: 30 December 1987 (age 38)
- Place of birth: Cologne, West Germany
- Height: 1.82 m (6 ft 0 in)
- Position: Striker

Team information
- Current team: Milazzo
- Number: 30

Youth career
- 1993–1995: SV Mülheim-Nord
- 1995–1999: Porz-Eil
- 1999–2004: SC Fortuna Köln

Senior career*
| Years | Team | Apps | (Gls) |
| 2004 | Salemi | 0 | (0) |
| 2004–2005 | Campobello di Mazara | ? | (9) |
| 2005–2011 | Palermo | 0 | (0) |
| 2007–2008 | → Sambenedettese (loan) | 29 | (9) |
| 2008–2009 | → Vicenza (loan) | 3 | (0) |
| 2009 | → Ravenna (loan) | 9 | (8) |
| 2009–2010 | → Cittadella (loan) | 20 | (3) |
| 2010–2011 | → Crotone (loan) | 22 | (4) |
| 2011–2012 | Triestina | 19 | (7) |
| 2012–2013 | Grosseto | 14 | (2) |
| 2013–2015 | Frosinone | 64 | (26) |
| 2015–2017 | Trapani | 31 | (6) |
| 2015–2016 | → Lecce (loan) | 18 | (4) |
| 2017–2020 | Catania | 82 | (22) |
| 2020–2022 | Catanzaro | 48 | (5) |
| 2022 | Vibonese | 13 | (4) |
| 2022–2023 | Messina | 24 | (1) |
| 2023–2024 | Terracina | | |
| 2024–2025 | Reggina | 15 | (2) |
| 2025 | Rossoblu Città di Luzzi | | |
| 2025– | Milazzo | 12 | (1) |

International career^{‡}
| 2008 | Italy U-20 | 3 | (0) |
| 2022– | Sicily | 1 | (1) |
- * Club domestic league appearances and goals as of 25 January 2026 ‡ National team caps and goals as of 10 June 2022

Davis Curiale (born 30 December 1987) is an Italian footballer who plays as a striker for Serie D club Milazzo.

== Career ==
=== Club career ===
Curiale is the son of Sicilian parents originally from Campobello di Mazara who emigrated to Germany in the 1980s. He started playing football at the age of 5 for local Cologne team SV Mülheim-Nord. Noted in 2004 by former Palermo and Udinese star Giovanni Montalbano, head coach of Eccellenza club Salemi at the time, during a summer beach soccer tournament in Campobello, he accepted to sign for the club but left it soon after to join Campobello, another Eccellenza team, in November 2004. He scored nine goals for Campobello, helping them to win Eccellenza Sicily and ensure a historical first promotion to Serie D. From 2005 to 2007, he played for Palermo Primavera, notably scoring 28 goals in the 2006–07 season with the Under-20 team, being instrumental in helping the rosanero youth team to reach the Campionato Nazionale Primavera semi-final, then lost to Inter Milan.

On 5 June 2007, Palermo loaned him out to Sambenedettese of Serie C1 in order to let him achieve some first-team experience. With Samb, Curiale played a total of 29 matches, scoring nine goals, and being instrumental in the team's escape from relegation.

Following his impressive experience with Sambenedettese, Curiale received some interest from several Serie B teams. In July 2008, Palermo and Vicenza agreed a one-year loan for the young striker. As he did not manage to gain a regular first-team place with Vicenza (only playing three games in the first half of the season), he returned to Palermo in January 2009 in order to be loaned to another team, Ravenna Calcio of Lega Pro Prima Divisione, for the remainder of the season. Curiale started impressively his second playing experience in the Italian third tier, becoming instrumental in Ravenna's rise in the league table by scoring eight goals in eight matches before suffering a muscle injury that will keep him out for two months.

Curiale then spent the 2009–10 season on loan to Serie B club Cittadella; he made a total 20 appearances during the regular season, scoring three goals.

In July 2010, he was sent out on loan again, this time to Serie B club Crotone; the club will also have the option to buy half of the player's registration rights at the end of the season.

On 31 August 2011, he moved to Triestina. Later, in January 2012, he joined the Serie B club Grosseto, but he played only 14 games in one year with the club. He successively left to join the Lega Pro Prima Divisione club Frosinone in January 2013, and he won promotion to Serie B with his new club in June 2014.

In January 2015, he was signed by Trapani Calcio for €150,000.

In August 2015, he moved to Lecce on loan. He scored four goals in 18 appearances before heading back to Trapani.

On 28 September 2020, he joined Catanzaro on a two-year contract.

On 31 January 2022, Curiale signed with Vibonese.

In August 2022, he signed for Serie C club Messina.

In September 2023, Curiale left professional football to join Eccellenza Lazio amateurs Terracina.

=== International career ===
Curiale played three games with the Italian under-20 team in March and April 2008.

On 10 June 2022, Curiale became the first captain of the UEFA-unrecognized Sicily national football team, playing a game against Sardinia. He scored one of the four Sicilian goals.
