= CONIFA African Football Cup =

International football tournament

- Founded: 2021
- Region: International (Africa) (Confederation of Independent Football Associations)
- Current champions: Biafra (1st title)
- Most championships: Biafra (1 title)
- 2026 CONIFA African Football Cup

The CONIFA African Football Cup is an international football tournament organized by CONIFA, an umbrella association for states, minorities, stateless peoples and regions unaffiliated with FIFA.

== History ==
Map of CONIFA Africa Football Cup Locations

=== Zanzibar 2021 (Canceled) ===
In February 2021, CONIFA announced that the 2021 edition of the CONIFA Africa Football Cup would take place in Zanzibar City, Zanzibar and feature 10 teams. The tournament was cancelled due to unknown reasons.

=== South Africa 2022 ===
Held in Johannesburg, South Africa the participants were Biafra, Matabeleland, and Yoruba Nation. The Matches were Yoruba Nation 1–1 Matabeleland, Matabeleland 1–0 Biafra FF, Biafra FF 1–0 Yoruba Nation, and Matabeleland 0–1 Biafra FF (Final).

Originally organised as a 4-team event, the tournament was reduced to 3-teams after Pro Arena Sports of South Africa withdrew.

=== Kenya 2026 ===
In January 2026, CONIFA Africa announced plans to organise the "CONIFA Africa Football Jamboree", including a 6-team Men's CONIFA African Football Cup, 3-team Women's CONIFA African Football Cup, 4-team Refugee Tournament, 3-team CONIFA No-Limits Tournament, and youth football exhibition event. The event would be held in Nairobi, Kenya in August 2026. The list of participants was not confirmed at launch with CONIFA recently announcing a number of new African refugee teams as members. The tournament was later delayed to the 19-24 October.

== Results ==
Ed.	Year	Host	First place game			Third place game			Num. teams
Ed.	Year	Host	(gold) Champion	Score	(silver) Runner-up	(bronze) Third	Score	Fourth	Num. teams
1	2022	South Africa	Biafra	1–0	Matabeleland	Yoruba Nation	—N/a		3
2	2026	Kenya		–					6

== Appearances ==
Legend

- 1st — Champions
- 2nd — Runners-up
- 3rd — Third place
- 4th — Fourth place
- GS — Group Stage
- q — Qualified for upcoming tournament
- •• — Qualified but withdrew
- • — Did not qualify
- × — Did not enter / Withdrew / Banned / Entry not accepted by CONIFA
- — Hosts

For each tournament, the number of teams in each finals tournament (in brackets) are shown.

CONIFA African Football Cup record
Team (Total 3 teams)	2022 (South Africa) (3)
Biafra	1st
Matabeleland	2nd
Yoruba Nation	3rd

== Members of CONIFA Africa ==
Africa (4)
Team
Biafra
Kabylia
Yoruba
YNFF
