= Simone Brugaletta =

Italian footballer

Personal information
- Date of birth: 19 January 1994 (age 32)
- Place of birth: Modica, Italy
- Height: 1.78 m (5 ft 10 in)
- Position: Defender

Team information
- Current team: Santa Maria Cilento
- Number: 19

Youth career
- Catania

Senior career*
Years	Team	Apps	(Gls)
2014	Catania	0	(0)
2014–2016	Teramo	25	(0)
2016–2019	Gela	86	(2)
2019–2020	Chieti	18	(1)
2020–2022	Sant'Agata	64	(0)
2022–2023	Acireale	30	(0)
2023	Ragusa	12	(0)
2023–	Santa Maria Cilento	2	(0)

International career
2022–	Sicily	1	(0)
- * Club domestic league appearances and goals as of 7 January 2024

Simone Brugaletta (born 19 January 1994) is an Italian footballer who plays as a defender for Serie D club Santa Maria Cilento.

== Career ==
Brugaletta started his career with Italian Serie A side Catania. In 2014, Brugaletta signed for Teramo in the Italian third tier, where he made 27 appearances and scored 0 goals. On 10 August 2014, he debuted for Teramo during a 2–3 loss to Südtirol.

In 2020, Brugaletta signed for Italian fourth tier club Sant'Agata.

In 2022, Brugaletta played for the Sicily national football team against Sardinia and then signed for Italian fourth-tier Serie D club Acireale.
