= CONIFA South America Football Cup =

International football tournament

CONIFA Copa América
- Organiser(s): CONIFA
- Founded: 2021; 5 years ago
- Region: South America
- Teams: 4
- Current champions: Maule Sur
- Most championships: Maule Sur (1 title)
- 2022 CONIFA Copa América

The CONIFA South America Football Cup, also referred to as CONIFA Copa América, is an international football tournament organized by CONIFA, an umbrella association for states, minorities, stateless peoples and regions unaffiliated with FIFA.

== History ==
=== Chile 2022 ===
On 24 January 2022, CONIFA announced that the first edition of the CONIFA South America Football Cup would take place in Linares, Chile and feature 4 teams (Aymara, Mapuche, Maule Sur and São Paulo FAD). São Paulo FAD however was unable to arrive in time for the dispute due to excessive ice on the roads in southern Chile, and the tournament has been changed to a single round robin format. Maule Sur won the first edition of the tournament.

== Results ==
Ed.	Year	Host	First place game			Third place game			Num. teams
Ed.	Year	Host	(gold) Champion	Score	(silver) Runner-up	(bronze) Third	Score	Fourth	Num. teams
1	2022	Chile	Maule Sur	Round-robin	Mapuche	Aymara	– (Note: Not held.)	– (Note: The fourth team, São Paulo FAD, withdrew from the competition.)	3

== Appearances ==
Legend

- 1st — Champions
- 2nd — Runners-up
- 3rd — Third place
- 4th — Fourth place
- GS — Group Stage
- q — Qualified for upcoming tournament
- •• — Qualified but withdrew
- • — Did not qualify
- × — Did not enter / Withdrew / Banned / Entry not accepted by CONIFA
- — Hosts

For each tournament, the number of teams in each finals tournament (in brackets) are shown.

Copa América CONIFA
Team (Total 3 teams)	2022 (Chile) (3)
Maule Sur	1st
Mapuche	2nd
Aymara	3rd
(São Paulo (state)) São Paulo FAD	×
