= Franklyn Akammadu =

Italian football player

Personal information
- Date of birth: 11 August 1998 (age 28)
- Place of birth: Padua, Italy
- Height: 1.80 m (5 ft 11 in)
- Position: Forward

Team information
- Current team: Bra
- Number: 9

Youth career
- –2016: Fiorentina
- 2015–2016: → Cesena (loan)
- 2016–2017: Cesena

Senior career*
Years	Team	Apps	(Gls)
2016	Cesena	1	(0)
2017	→ Fermana (loan)	4	(0)
2018	→ Prato (loan)	12	(0)
2018–2020	Alessandria	16	(3)
2018	→ Tranmere Rovers (loan)	1	(0)
2020	Prato	4	(0)
2020	Forlì	4	(0)
2020–2021	Campodarsego	30	(7)
2021	Chieti	15	(3)
2021–2022	Sangiovannese	18	(2)
2022	Scandicci	16	(2)
2022–2023	Monte Procedo	16	(2)
2023–2024	Certaldo	31	(8)
2024–2025	Crema	36	(20)
2025–2026	Giana Erminio	19	(2)
2026–	Bra	7	(0)
- * Club domestic league appearances and goals as of 30 April 2026

Franklyn Obunike Akammadu (born 11 August 1998) is an Italian football player who plays as a forward for Serie D club Paganese.

== Club career ==
He made his Serie B debut for Cesena on 18 May 2017 in a game against Verona. On 22 August 2018, Akammadu joined League Two side Tranmere Rovers on a season-long loan deal from Alessandria, however the deal was terminated part way through the season after Akammadu had been given limited opportunities. On 27 January 2020, he was released from his contract with Alessandria.
