= VfL Fosite Helgoland =

- Full name: VfL Fosite Helgoland von 1893 e.V.
- Founded: 1893
- Ground: Fußballplatz Helgoland Arena
- Chairman: Stefan Pfeifer

VfL Fosite Helgoland is a German football and multi-sport club located on the North Sea island of Heligoland. Due to the island's remoteness and high travel expenses, the club does not play in the German football league system, but it does play friendly matches and tournaments against visiting teams. The low population of Heligoland (under 1,400 people) poses a challenge for player recruitment.

VfL Fosite Helgoland is a member of the Hamburg Football Association and participated in the Hamburg Cup in the past. However, it has not played in an official competition for many years.

== CONIFA Membership ==
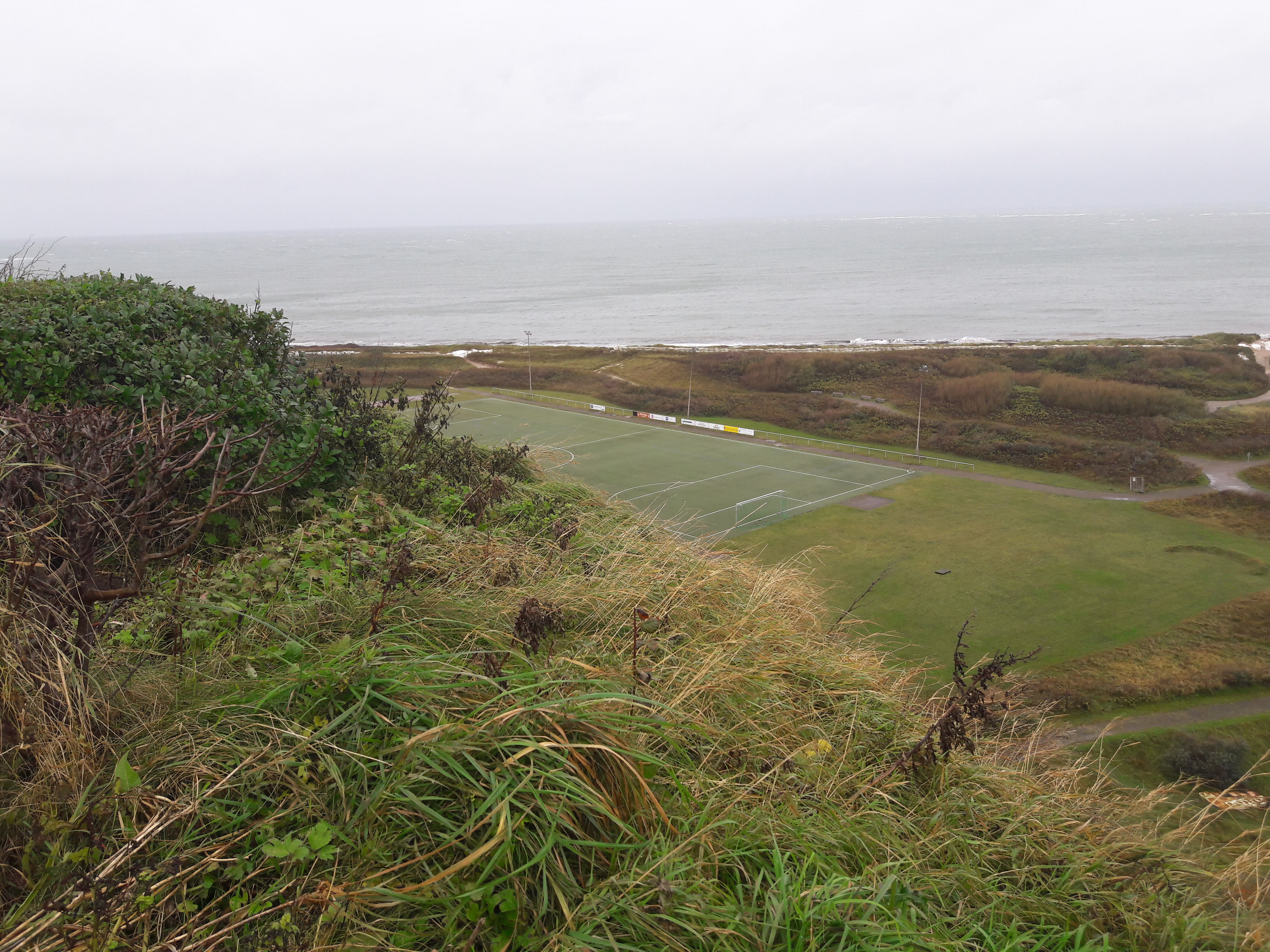
The football stadium on Heligoland

The club was formerly a member of CONIFA and sought to represent Heligoland in international competition, but left the organization in 2017 without having played any matches.
