= Maule Sur football team =

Regional Chilean association football team

Maule Sur
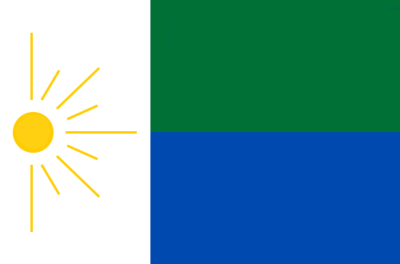
- Confederation: ConIFA
- Head coach: Eduardo Grandón
- Top scorer: Erick Acuña; Cristián Arrué; Diego Reveco; Manuel Grandón; Cristián Liencura (1)

First international
- Mapuche 3–3 Maule Sur (Temuco, Chile, 26 March 2022)

Biggest win
- Mapuche 0–1 Maule Sur (Linares, Chile, 17 June 2022); Maule Sur 1–0 Aymara (Linares, Chile, 19 June 2022)

Biggest defeat
- None

CONIFA South America Football Cup
- Appearances: 1 (first in 2022)
- Best result: Champion (2022)

The Maule Sur football team (Spanish: Selección Maule Sur) is a football team representing the south of the Maule Region in Chile. The stated mission of the team is "to represent the territory of Maule Sur, its culture, identity and history in a local, national and international level". Maule Sur is a member of ConIFA.

== History ==
In 2022, Maule Sur appointed Jaime Pacheco as manager. Maule Sur won the 2022 CONIFA South America Football Cup, the first-ever CONIFA South America Football Cup. Maule Sur was set to participate in the 2024 CONIFA World Football Cup before its cancellation. As of 2026, Maule Sur no longer appears on the ConIFA list of member associations.

== Competitive record ==
=== ConIFA South America Football Cup record ===
CONIFA South America Football Cup record
Year	Round	Position	GP	W	D	L	GS	GA
(Chile) 2022	Champions	1st	2	2	0	0	2	0
Total	1 title	1/1	2	2	0	0	2	0
