= Easter Island official football team =

Chilean football team

Easter Island Rapa Nui
- Association: Asociación de Fútbol de Isla de Pascua (AFIPA)
- Confederation: World Unity Football Alliance (WUFA); South American Board of New Football Federations (COSANFF)
- Top scorer: Francisco Federico Pate Tuki (4)
- Home stadium: Estadio de Hanga Roa
First colours	Second colours

First international
- Juan Fernández Islands 3–5 Easter Island (San Juan Bautista, Juan Fernández Islands; September 1996)

Biggest win
- Easter Island 16–0 Juan Fernández Islands (Hanga Roa, Easter Island; 28 September 2000)

Biggest defeat
- Easter Island 0–5 Falkland Islands (Hanga Roa, Easter Island; 7 November 2012)

The Easter Island official football team, also known as Rapa Nui, is an association football team from Chile which represents the territory of Easter Island in association football. Their home games are played at the Estadio de Hanga Roa, which has a capacity of approximately 2,500 people. The national team participated in the 2009 Copa Chile under the name CF Rapa Nui.

== Asociación de Fútbol de Isla de Pascua ==
The Asociación de Fútbol de Isla de Pascua (AFIPA) is the Easter Island football association.

== History ==
The team played two unofficial games against a team from the Juan Fernández Islands in 1996 and 2000, before playing its first official match on 5 August 2009, in the first round of the Copa Chile 2009; CF Rapa Nui lost 4–0 against Colo-Colo.

For its game against Colo-Colo the team was coached by former Chilean international Miguel Angel Gamboa, who spent several weeks honing the skills of the local players, as well as teaching them the basics of heading, shooting, and positioning.

In 2018, the team competed at the "Festival des Îles" in Tahiti, finishing in 3rd position in the group (of five teams), with two wins, one loss and one draw.

== Competitive record ==
=== National Soccer Championship of Native Peoples ===
National Soccer Championship of Native Peoples record
Year	Round	Position	Pld	W	D	L	GF	GA
(Chile) 2012	Champions	1st	4	3	1	0	24	5
(Chile) 2013	Third place	3rd	5	3	0	2	12	6
(Chile) 2015	Third place	3rd	5	4	0	1	13	7
Total	1 Title	3/3	14	10	1	3	49	18

=== ConIFA South America Football Cup record ===
CONIFA South America Football Cup record
Year	Round	Position	GP	W	D	L	GS	GA
(Chile) 2022	Did not participate							
Total	–	0/1	–	–	–	–	–	–
