= Australian First Nations Mariya =

Australian football club

Australian First Nations
- Nickname: Mariya
- Association: Australian First Nations Mariya
- Head coach: Jade North

First international
- NZ Māori 3–2 Mariya (Papakura, New Zealand; 20 January 2018)

Biggest win
- South Coast Police Force 1–8 Mariya (Wollongong, Australia; unknown date 2019)

Biggest defeat
- (African Union) Africa Nations FA 6–2 Mariya (Wollongong, Australia; unknown date 2019)

The Australian First Nations Mariya, also known as Mariya (meaning 'Emu' in the Dhurga language), are an international association football team that represents the first nations peoples of Australia. They were members of CONIFA from 2018 but left at an unspecified point.

== History ==
Mariya made their debut on 20 January 2018 against NZ Māori, losing 3–2 in a 'Clash of the Cultures' match at McLennan Park, Papakura. The following year they competed again at the 'Clash of the Cultures', this time held in Wollongong, where they beat the South Coast Police Force 8–1 and an African Nations FA team 6–2 but fell to defeat against semi-pro team Wollongong Wolves 2–0. The senior men's NZ Māori team did not compete. On 18 January 2020, at the third iteration of 'Clash of the Cultures', Mariya drew 1–1 with NZ Māori after a 90th-minute equaliser following a Mariya goal in the 73rd minute. Mariya would have competed at the 2020 CONIFA World Football Cup in Skopje, North Macedonia had it not been cancelled for COVID-19 reasons. They are coached by Jade North, the first indigenous Australian to captain the Socceroos.
