= Estadio Fiscal de Linares =

Stadium in Linares, Chile

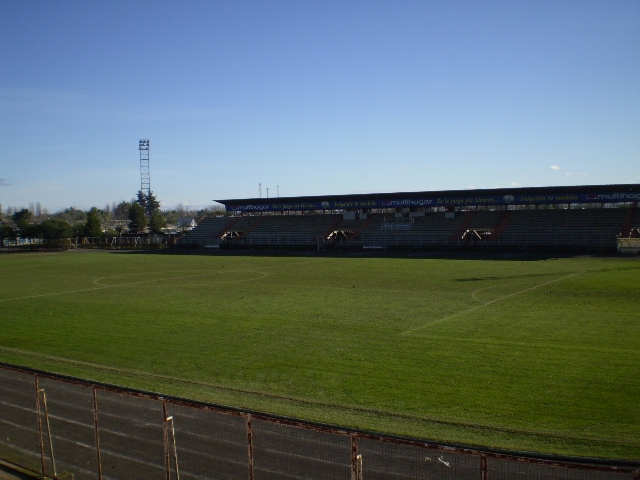
- Location: Linares, Chile
- Coordinates: 35°51′19.53″S 71°35′27.72″W
- Capacity: 7,000
- Surface: grass
- Opened: 1948

Tenants
- Linares Unido Rangers de Talca (2025)

Estadio Fiscal de Linares is a multi-use public stadium in Linares, Chile. It is currently used mostly for football matches and is the home stadium of Linares Unido. The stadium holds 7,000 people and was built in 1948. It was the host stadium for the 2022 CONIFA South America Football Cup.
