= Tommaso Maressa =

Italian footballer (born 2004)

Personal information
- Date of birth: 29 February 2004 (age 22)
- Place of birth: Palizzi, Italy
- Height: 1.84 m (6 ft 0 in)
- Position: Midfielder

Team information
- Current team: Bra
- Number: 29

Youth career
- –2018: Reggina
- 2018–2019: Empoli
- 2019–2023: Juventus

Senior career*
| Years | Team | Apps | (Gls) |
| 2022–2024 | Juventus Next Gen | 4 | (0) |
| 2024 | → Bellinzona (loan) | 9 | (0) |
| 2024–2025 | Carrarese | 0 | (0) |
| 2025 | Novara | 10 | (1) |
| 2025– | Bra | 30 | (0) |

International career^{‡}
| 2019 | Italy U15 | 4 | (0) |
| 2019–2020 | Italy U16 | 12 | (0) |
| 2021–2022 | Italy U18 | 4 | (0) |
| 2022 | Italy U19 | 2 | (0) |
- * Club domestic league appearances and goals as of 30 April 2026 ‡ National team caps and goals as of 10 August 2022

Tommaso Maressa (born 29 February 2004) is an Italian footballer who plays as a midfielder for Serie D club Bra.

== Early life ==
As a youth player, Maressa joined the youth academy of Italian side Empoli. He helped the club win the league.

== Club career ==
Maressa started his career with Italian side Juventus Next Gen. On 2 September 2023, he debuted for the club during a 1–3 loss to Pescara.

On 14 February 2024, he was sent on loan to Swiss side Bellinzona. On 17 February 2024, he debuted for the club during a 0–0 draw with Wil.

On 30 August 2024, Maressa joined Carrarese in Serie B.

On 3 February 2025, Maressa signed a one-and-a-half-year contract with Novara in Serie C.

== International career ==
Maressa has represented Italy internationally at youth level.

== Style of play ==
Maressa mainly operates as a midfielder. He is known for his versatility and shooting ability.

== Personal life ==
Maressa is a native of Palizzi, Italy.
