= Rohingya national football team =

Association football team representing the Rohingya people

Rohingya
- Association: Rohingya Football Club (RFC)
- Confederation: CONIFA
First colours	Second colours
- Website: rohingyafc.com

The Rohingya national football team represents the Rohingya people, a predominantly Muslim ethnic group in Rakhine State, Myanmar (also known as Arakan, Burma). The team is not affiliated with FIFA and therefore cannot compete for the FIFA World Cup. However, it is a member of CONIFA, a federation of football associations representing ethnic minorities and stateless nations.

The team is sponsored by Rohingya Vision TV, the Kick Project (NGO), and the Government of Australia.

== Rohingya Football Club ==
It is composed of refugees living in Kuala Lumpur, Malaysia, who are members of the Rohingya Football Club (RFC), which was founded in 2015.
