= Mapuche football team =

Unofficial football team representing the Mapuche

Mapuche
- Association: Mapuche Football Association
- Confederation: ConIFA; COSANFF; WUFA
First colours	Second colours

First international
- Mapuche 1–1 Aymara (Chile; 22 January 2011)

Biggest win
- Mapuche 13–0 Qulla (Limache, Chile; 6 August 2013)

Biggest defeat
- Mapuche 0–3 Huilliche (Limache, Chile; 10 August 2013)

ConIFA World Football Cup
- Appearances: 1 (first in 2020—cancelled)

National Championship of First Peoples
- Appearances: 3 (first in 2015)
- Best result: Champion 2015

The Mapuche football team is a football team representing the Mapuche of Chile and Argentina and is controlled by the Mapuche Football Association, founded in 2007. The stated mission of the team is "...to allow Mapuche as a distinct cultural entity, with common interests to be represented at the international level in the sport. Mapuche is a member of ConIFA and COSANFF. Mapuche would have participated in the 2020 ConIFA World Football Cup.

Mapuche won the 2015 National Championship of First Peoples in Chile.

The selection of Mapuche appears in a fake documentary, in the 1942 FIFA World Cup in Patagonia and wins the competition in the final against Germany (2–1).

== Tournament records ==
=== ConIFA World Football Cup record ===
Year	Position	GP	W	D	L	GS	GA
(Sápmi) 2014	did not enter						
(Abkhazia) 2016	did not enter						
(Barawa) 2018	did not enter						
(Kurdistan Region) 2024	cancelled						
Total		—	–	–	–	–	–

=== ConIFA South America Football Cup record ===
Year	Position	GP	W	D	L	GS	GA
(Chile) 2022	Runners-up	2	1	0	1	3	2
Total		2	1	0	1	3	2

=== National Championship of First Peoples ===
Year	Position	GP	W	D	L	GS	GA	GD
(Chile) 2012	Runners-up	4	3	1	0	10	2	+8
(Chile) 2013	Runners-up	5	4	0	1	27	7	+20
(Chile) 2015	Champion	5	4	1	0	23	4	+19
Total	Best: 1st	14	11	2	1	60	13	+47

=== Temuco Anniversary Cup ===
131st anniversary of the founding of the city of Temuco in Chile.

Year	Position	GP	W	D	L	GS	GA	GD
(Chile) 2012	Champion	2	2	0	0	11	0	+11
Total	Best: 1st	2	2	0	0	11	0	+11

== Results and upcoming fixtures ==
Date	Venue	Opponent	Score
21 January 2007	2007 Friendly – Chile	Combinado de Teodoro Schmidt	8–2 report
22 January 2011	2011 Friendly – Chile	Aymara	1–1 report
23 January 2011	2011 Friendly – Chile	Aymara	5–2
28 December 2011	2011 Friendly – Chile	Deportivo Dante de Nueva Imperial	0–3 report
3 January 2012	2012 Friendly – Chile	General Quepe	4–2 report
20 January 2012	2012 Friendly – Chile	CD Comercial	1–2 report
26 January 2012	2012 Friendly – Chile	Consejo Maquehue	1–1 report
28 January 2012	2012 Friendly – Chile	Consejo Maquehue	6–3 report
3 February 2012	2012 Friendly – Chile	Pizarro	3–0 report
9 February 2012	2012 Friendly – Chile	Deportivo Meza PLC	5–3
10 February 2012	2012 Friendly – Chile	University de Chile Filial IX Región	5–0
16 February 2012	2012 Friendly – Chile	Misional	5–1
24 February 2012	2012 Temuco Anniversary Cup – Chile	Juvenil Obrero	3–0 report
27 February 2012	2012 Temuco Anniversary Cup – Chile	Juvenil Obrero	8–0 report
20 June 2012	2012 National Championship of First Peoples – Chile	Aymara	2–0 report
21 June 2012	2012 National Championship of First Peoples – Chile	Pehuenche	2–0 report
23 June 2012	2012 National Championship of First Peoples – Chile	Atacama	4–0 report
24 June 2012	2012 National Championship of First Peoples – Chile	Rapa Nui	2–2 (2-4) report
8 November 2012	2012 Friendly – Chile	Club Deportivo Porvenir de Temuco	1–3 report
19 November 2012	2012 Mapuche University Soccer Cup – Chile	Universidad Autónoma de Chile	8–0 report
24 November 2012	2012 Mapuche University Soccer Cup – Chile	Hogar Lawen Mapu	?–?
29 November 2012	2012 Mapuche University Soccer Cup – Chile	?	?–?
5 August 2013	2013 National Championship of First Peoples – Chile	Kawésqar	10–1 report
7 August 2013	2013 National Championship of First Peoples – Chile	Qulla	13–0 report
8 August 2013	2013 National Championship of First Peoples – Chile	Quechuan	1–1 report
9 August 2013	2013 National Championship of First Peoples – Chile	Rapa Nui	3–2 report
10 August 2013	2013 National Championship of First Peoples – Chile	Huilliche	0–3 report
10 October 2014	2014 Friendly – Chile	Aymara	3–4
20 April 2015	2015 National Championship of First Peoples – Chile	Qulla	4–1 report
21 April 2015	2015 National Championship of First Peoples – Chile	Quechuan	9–1 report
22 April 2015	2015 National Championship of First Peoples – Chile	Aymara	1–1 report
23 April 2015	2015 National Championship of First Peoples – Chile	Kawésqar/Yaghan	8–1 report
25 April 2015	2015 National Championship of First Peoples – Chile	Aymara	1–0 report
15 April 2017	2017 Friendly – Chile	Esperanto	8–1 report
7 February 2020	2020 Friendly – Chile	Deportivo Meza PLC	5–4
18 February 2020	2020 Friendly – Chile	CD Comercial	0–1
3 March 2020	2020 Friendly – Chile	Deportivo Meza PLC	1–1
26 March 2022	2022 Friendly – Chile	Maule Sur	3–3 report
8 April 2022	2022 Friendly – Chile	Rural de Temuco	0–1
17 June 2022	2022 CONIFA South America Football Cup	Maule Sur	0–1
18 June 2022	2022 CONIFA South America Football Cup	Aymara	3–1

It seems that there were 2 games during the Copa de Fútbol de Universitarios Mapuche 2012.

=== Selected International Opponents ===
Opponents	Matches	Win	Draw	Loss	GF	GA
ConIFA / CSANF
Aymara	7	4	2	1	14	8
Rapa Nui	2	1	1	0	5	4
Qulla	2	2	0	0	17	1
Quechuan	2	1	1	0	10	2
Maule Sur	2	0	1	1	3	4
Huilliche	1	0	0	1	0	3
Atacama	1	1	0	0	4	0
Pehuenche	1	1	0	0	2	0
Kawésqar	1	1	0	0	10	1
Kawésqar/Yaghan	1	1	0	0	8	1
Esperanto	1	1	0	0	8	1
Totals ConIFA / CSANF	21	13	5	3	83	26
Clubs
Deportivo Meza PLC	3	2	1	0	11	8
Juvenil Obrero	2	2	0	0	11	0
Consejo Maquehue	2	1	1	0	7	4
CD Comercial	2	0	0	2	1	3
Misional	1	1	0	0	5	1
Universidad Autónoma de Chile	1	1	0	0	8	0
University de Chile Filial IX Región	1	1	0	0	5	0
Pizarro	1	1	0	0	3	0
General Quepe	1	1	0	0	4	2
Combinado de Teodoro Schmidt	1	1	0	0	8	2
Deportivo Dante de Nueva Imperial	1	0	0	1	0	3
Club Deportivo Porvenir de Temuco	1	0	0	1	1	3
Rural de Temuco	1	0	0	1	0	1
Totals Clubs	18	11	2	5	64	27
Totals	39	24	7	8	147	53

=== Results by year ===
Period	Played	Won	Drawn	Lost	Win %
2007	1	1	0	0	100
2011	3	1	1	1	33.33
2012	16	12	2	2	75
2013	5	3	1	1	60
2014	1	0	0	1	0
2015	5	4	1	0	80
2017	1	1	0	0	100
2020	3	1	1	1	33.33
2022	4	1	1	2	25
Totals	39	24	7	8	61.53
