= Koro Pate =

Rapanui footballer

Personal information
- Full name: Francisco Federico Pate Tuki
- Date of birth: 1994 (age 31–32)
- Place of birth: Rapa Nui, Chile
- Positions: Goalkeeper; forward

Senior career*
Years	Team	Apps	(Gls)
2009	CF Rapa Nui	0	(0)

International career^{‡}
	Easter Island	?	(4)
- * Club domestic league appearances and goals as of August 2026 ‡ National team caps and goals as of 30 May 2021

Francisco Federico "Koro" Pate Tuki (born 1994) is a Chilean footballer who played for the Easter Island official football team, whom he is the topscorer.

== Career ==
He made his debut for CF Rapa Nui in the 2009 Copa Chile as a 15-year-old substitute goalkeeper after Emilio Calvo dislocated his right thumb. He made 2 impressive saves, stopping a shot from Ezequiel Miralles in the 49th minute, and another from Phillip Araos in the 83rd. In 2018, he scored a brace against AS St.Etienne and scored goals against Team Education and AS Mira. He is also partakes in canoeing for Chile, who he has traveled with to New Zealand, Tahiti, Brazil, Peru, Argentina and New Caledonia.
