= AC Bra =

Italian football club

Bra
- Full name: Associazione Calcio Bra s.r.l.
- Founded: 1913; 113 years ago
- Ground: Stadio Attilio Bravi, Bra, Italy
- Capacity: 830
- Chairman: Uzay Efe Cabuk
- Manager: Rhys Crosland
- League: Serie C Group B
- 2024–25: Serie D Group A, 1st of 20 (promoted)
Home colours	Away colours

Associazione Calcio Bra is an Italian association football club, based in Bra, Piedmont. The club competes in the Serie C Group B.

== History ==
Established as Unione Sportiva Braidese, with light blue and white as official colours, the team played its inaugural match on 1 May 1913, drawing 1–1 against Mondovì. The club's early years were characterized by intermittent activity until 1926, when they inaugurated the "Madonna dei Fiori" stadium (named after the nearby church) with a friendly match against Torino, which ended in a 2–1 defeat. In the 1926–27 season, the team made its debut in the Terza Divisione Piemontese, securing immediate promotion to the Seconda Divisione. By 1930, they reached the Prima Divisione but withdrew after one season due to financial and organizational challenges. The club ceased operations in 1933 but was re-established in 1937 as Associazione Calcio Bra, adopting yellow and red as their official colours.

After World War II, AC Bra was admitted to Serie C in 1946. However, the club faced relegation shortly thereafter and experienced several periods of inactivity and reformation. In 1955, the club was shortly renamed Virtus Bra. Despite ongoing challenges, including another dissolution in 1959, AC Bra persisted, re-entering competitive football in the lower tiers and gradually climbing the ranks.

At the end of the 2011–12 season, the team was promoted from Eccellenza Piedmont and Aosta Valley/B to Serie D.

At the end of the 2012–13 season, the team was promoted from Serie D/A to Lega Pro Seconda Divisione. Although they faced relegation in the 2013–14 season, the club demonstrated resilience.

After another decade spent in Serie D, on 13 April 2025, Bra was promoted to Serie C after winning their group.

== Players ==
As of 2 February 2026

Note: Flags indicate national team as defined under FIFA eligibility rules; some limited exceptions apply. Players may hold more than one non-FIFA nationality.

No.	Pos.	Nation	Player
1	GK	ITA	Davide Franzini (on loan from Bologna)
2	DF	ITA	Damiano Lia
3	DF	ITA	Benedikt Rottensteiner (on loan from Südtirol)
5	DF	ITA	Mattia Pretato
6	DF	ITA	Riccardo Sganzerla
7	MF	ITA	Samuele Giallombardo
8	MF	ITA	Stefano Tuzza
9	FW	NGA	Franklyn Akammadu
10	MF	ITA	Matteo Pautassi
11	FW	KOS	Ismet Sinani
12	GK	ITA	Daniele Menicucci
14	MF	ITA	Giorgio Lionetti
16	MF	FIN	Daniel Armstrong (on loan from Atalanta)
17	DF	ITA	Alessandro Fiordaliso
19	FW	ITA	Thomas Scapin (on loan from Dolomiti Bellunesi)
20	DF	ITA	Lorenzo Milani (on loan from Heracles Almelo)
22	GK	ITA	Davide Renzetti (on loan from Lazio)
25	MF	ITA	Luca Corsi

No.	Pos.	Nation	Player
27	MF	ITA	Riccardo Campedelli (on loan from Cesena)
28	MF	ITA	Samuele Dimatteo
29	MF	ITA	Tommaso Maressa
31	DF	ITA	Eros De Santis
36	DF	ITA	Matteo Rabuffi
37	MF	ITA	Mattia Leoncini
47	MF	ITA	Mattia La Marca
55	MF	ITA	Andrea Nesci
72	DF	ITA	Francesco Pio Cucciniello
76	FW	ROU	Alexandru Capac (on loan from Atalanta)
77	MF	ITA	Alessio Brambilla (on loan from Cremonese)
92	FW	ITA	Enrico Baldini
99	MF	ITA	Alexander Chianese
—	DF	ITA	Martin Miculi
—	DF	ITA	Umberto Morleo (on loan from Catanzaro)
—	FW	ITA	Gianmarco Di Biase (on loan from Juventus)
—	FW	ITA	Gabriel Gaglioti

=== Out on loan ===
Note: Flags indicate national team as defined under FIFA eligibility rules; some limited exceptions apply. Players may hold more than one non-FIFA nationality.

No.	Pos.	Nation	Player
—	FW	ITA	Davide Aloia (at Este until 30 June 2026)

== Colors and badge ==
The team's colours are yellow and red.
