= 2021 CONIFA No Limits Mediterranean Futsal Cup =

2021 ConIFA No Limits Mediterranean Futsal Cup

Tournament details
- Host country: Sanremo (Italy)
- Dates: 11 September
- Teams: 6
- Venue(s): 1 (in 1 host city)

Final positions
- Champions: County of Nice
- Runners-up: Sardinia
- Third place: Elba
- Fourth place: Sicily

Tournament statistics
- Matches played: 9
- Goals scored: 44 (4.89 per match)
- Top scorer(s): Federico Todella (6 goals)

The 2021 ConIFA No Limits Mediterranean Futsal Cup was the first futsal tournament organized by the Confederation of Independent Football Associations. It was hosted in Sanremo and won by the County of Nice national football team.

== Tournament ==
The tournament was organized by the CONIFA No Limits area directed by Francesco Zema. It was part of a socio-cultural exhibition co-organized by the project "Calci: Comunità Resilienti" with the collaboration of the Principality of Seborga.

The event took place on 11 September 2021 and was broadcast on internet thanks to the media partner WeSport.it.

== Participants ==
CONIFA teams	Invited teams
County of Nice; Elba; Sardinia; Sicily	Seborga; Terra Brigasca

The participants have been drawn into 2 groups of 3. The top teams from each group advanced to the final.

The tournament marked the official debut of the national teams of Sicily and Elba in a CONIFA competition.

== Matches ==
=== Group A ===
Team	Pld	W	D	L	GF	GA	GD	Pts
County of Nice	2	2	0	0	7	2	+5	6
Sicily	2	1	0	1	2	2	0	3
Seborga	2	0	0	2	1	6	−5	0

Source: WeSport.it
September 11, 2021
14:20 GMT+2

Sicily	1–0	Seborga
Goal

September 11, 2021
15:00 GMT+2

Seborga	1–5	County of Nice
Goal		Goal

September 11, 2021
15:30 GMT+2

County of Nice	2–1	Sicily
Goal		Goal

=== Group B ===
Team	Pld	W	D	L	GF	GA	GD	Pts
Sardinia	2	2	0	0	7	0	+7	6
Elba	2	1	0	1	4	3	+1	3
Tera Brigasca	2	0	0	2	1	9	−8	0

Source: WeSport.it
September 11, 2021
16:20 GMT+2

Sardinia	5–0	Terra Brigasca
Goal

September 11, 2021
17:00 GMT+2

Terra Brigasca	1–4	Elba
Goal		Goal

September 11, 2021
17:30 GMT+2

Elba	0–2	Sardinia
		Goal

=== Fifth-Place play-off ===
September 11, 2021
18:00 GMT+2

Terra Brigasca	3–4	Seborga
Goal		Goal

=== Third-Place play-off ===
September 11, 2021
19:00 GMT+2

Sicily	4–4	Elba
Goal		Goal
Penalties
Penalty scored Penalty missed	4–5	Penalty missed Penalty scored

=== Final ===
September 11, 2021
20:00 GMT+2

Sardinia	2–5	County of Nice
Goal		Goal
