= Cliff Moyo =

Zimbabwean footballer (born 1993)

Personal information
- Date of birth: 6 April 1993 (age 33)
- Place of birth: Bulawayo, Zimbabwe
- Height: 6 ft 0 in (1.83 m)
- Position: Defender

Team information
- Current team: Kidderminster Harriers
- Number: 20

Youth career
- 2005–2007: Duffield Dynamos
- 2007–?: Milton Express
- Stone Dominoes

Senior career*
Years	Team	Apps	(Gls)
2011–2013	Barrow	10	(0)
2011	→ Northwich Victoria (loan)		
2012	→ Droylsden (loan)	10	(0)
2012	→ Droylsden (loan)	8	(0)
2014	Witton Albion		
2014–2015	Trafford	7	(1)
2015	Nantwich Town	4	(0)
2015–2016	Alfreton Town	34	(0)
2016–2018	FC Halifax Town	47	(1)
2018–2019	Guiseley	6	(1)
2019–2022	Kidderminster Harriers	34	(2)

International career^{‡}
2018	Zimbabwe	1	(0)
- * Club domestic league appearances and goals as of 17:42, 24 May 2018 (UTC) ‡ National team caps and goals as of 18:42, 21 March 2018 (UTC)

Cliff Moyo (born 6 April 1993) is a former Zimbabwean international footballer who last played for Kidderminster Harriers as a defender.

== Early life ==
Moyo was born in Bulawayo in Zimbabwe. His father Olbern was a musician and eventually settled in England with Moyo's mother. Moyo chose to remain in Zimbabwe with his grandparents where he attended Robert Tredgold Primary School. In 2002, at age nine, he moved to England to live with his parents in Stoke-on-Trent.

== Club career ==
After moving to England, Moyo began playing football at the age of thirteen for local youth club Duffield Dynamos and later played for Milton Express and Stone Dominoes in the Stoke area, also spending time on trial with Stoke City. He was chosen to represent the Staffordshire County team at the age of sixteen. He joined Barrow at the age of eighteen, signing a one-year deal, and began studying a sports science degree at Staffordshire University alongside playing football. His university commitments would eventually lead to his departure from Barrow in 2013 as he decided to take a three-year break from the game after struggling to make the three hour journey from his home for training and matches due to his studies.

Following his release from Barrow, he spent short spells with local sides Witton Albion, Trafford and Nantwich Town during his break. Following his graduation from university, Moyo joined Alfreton Town after featuring for the side in pre-season matches. He spent one season at the club before joining FC Halifax Town in 2016. His departure from Alfreton drew criticism from manager Nicky Law who claimed that Moyo had verbally agreed to sign a new deal with the club and that the player did not inform him of the move. In his first season with Halifax, he helped the club win promotion to the National League. Moyo later moved on to play for Guiseley.

On 4 June 2019, Cliff Moyo signed for former Football League club Kidderminster Harriers.

On 12 July 2022, Moyo decided to step away from football to spend time with his family.

== International career ==
After playing for Staffordshire, he was called up to the England under-18 team.

Moyo was called up by the Zimbabwe national team for the first time in March 2018. He made his debut in the semi-final of the 2018 Four Nations Tournament, during a penalty shootout defeat against hosts Zambia on 21 March 2018.

In May 2018 he was called up to the Matabeleland football team for the 2018 ConIFA World Football Cup. However he did not travel with the final squad.
