= Yoruba national football team =

Yorùbá National Football Team
- Nickname: Yorùbá Leopards
- Association: Yoruba Football Federation
- Confederation: ConIFA
- Sub-confederation: ConIFA Africa
- Home stadium: Onikan Stadium
First colours

First international
- Yorùbá 1–1 Matabeleland (Johannesburg, South Africa; 21 May 2022)

Biggest win
- None

Biggest defeat
- Website: https://yorubaff.org

The Yoruba national football team was founded as a football team for the Yoruba people internationally. The Yoruba Football Federation was admitted into second world organization organizing a football cup aside from FIFA, the CONIFA Confederation of independent football association in October, 2020. The Yoruba Football Federation is not a member of FIFA, CAF or WAFU therefore it can't play any games organised by these organizations.

== History ==
The Yoruba Football Federation was established on 1 September 2020 with its grounds at Onikan Stadium in Yorubaland. Representing a footballing nation of players and supporters, the federation serves to develop and celebrate Yoruba football.

In October 2020 the Yoruba Football Federation was admitted into the Confederation of Independent Football Associations (CONIFA). CONIFA is the football federations for all associations outside of FIFA.

Yoruba Nation debuted at the 2022 African Cup, where they finished 3rd, drawing Matebeleland 1-1 but losing to Biafra 1-0.

== Colours and logo ==
The official colours of the Yoruba national football team are green, red, black and white, like the Yoruba Flag.

The meaning of the shirt colours is as follows: "Red represents the blood of the martyrs shed in the various struggle of the Yoruba wars from ancient history, through the Fulani invasions to the Operation Wetie, the Agbekoya revolt and the June 12 uprising, among others. Black represents the colour of the black man's skin. The Yoruba represent the largest collection of any ethnic group of the black race anywhere in the world. We are the shining beacon for all black people all over the world."
