= Damiano Lia =

Italian footballer (born 1997)

Personal information
- Date of birth: 25 November 1997 (age 28)
- Place of birth: Lentini, Italy
- Height: 1.75 m (5 ft 9 in)
- Position: Right-back

Team information
- Current team: Bra
- Number: 2

Youth career
- Messina

Senior career*
Years	Team	Apps	(Gls)
2015–2016	Messina	0	(0)
2015	→ SC Ligorna (loan)	2	(0)
2016–2017	Sicula Leonzio	14	(2)
2017–2018	Messina	28	(1)
2018–2019	Cavese	25	(1)
2019–2020	Juve Stabia	6	(0)
2020	→ Sicula Leonzio (loan)	4	(0)
2021–2022	Imolese	28	(1)
2022–2023	Vibonese	16	(0)
2023–2025	Messina	50	(0)
2025	Sarnese	4	(0)
2025–	Bra	12	(0)
- * Club domestic league appearances and goals as of 30 April 2026

Damiano Lia (born 25 November 1997) is an Italian professional footballer who plays as a right-back for Serie D club Bra.

== Club career ==
Born in Lentini, Sicily, Lia started his career on Messina youth sector. In 2015, he was loaned to Serie D club SC Ligorna, on this team he made his senior debut.

He left the club in the 2016–17 season, and joined to Serie D club Sicula Leonzio. He won the promotion to Serie C this year, however, he return to ACR Messina on Serie D.

On 23 August 2018, he signed for Serie C club Cavese. Lia made his professional debut on 16 September 2018 against Casertana.

He played one season with Cavese. In June 2019 he joined Serie B club Juve Stabia. On 9 January 2020, he was loaned to Sicula Leonzio. The next season, he returned to Juve Stabia, this time in Serie C.

On 10 January 2020, he returned to Sicula Leonzio.

On 28 August 2021, he signed with Imolese, on Serie C.

In December 2022, Lia signed for Vibonese.

On 25 July 2023, Lia returned to Messina.
