= Matabeleland football team =

National association football team

Matabeleland
- Nickname: Ingqungqulu
- Association: Matabeleland Football Confederacy
- Confederation: ConIFA; WUFA
- Head coach: Giuseppe Cristaldi
- Captain: Praise Ndlovu
- Most caps: Khulekani Maziwa; Oscar George (24)
- Top scorer: Sawusani Mudimba; Mduduzi Mpofu (13)
- Home stadium: Various Stadiums
First colours

First international
- Padania 6–1 Matabeleland (Sutton, United Kingdom; 31 May 2018)

Biggest win
- Tuvalu 1–3 Matabeleland (Haringey, United Kingdom; 3 June 2018)

Biggest defeat
- Padania 6–1 Matabeleland (Sutton, United Kingdom; 31 May 2018)

CONIFA World Football Cup
- Appearances: 1 (first in 2018)
- Best result: 13th, 2018

The Matabeleland football team is the team representing Matabeleland, the western part of Zimbabwe. They are not affiliated with FIFA or CAF, and therefore cannot compete for the FIFA World Cup or the Africa Cup of Nations. The team is affiliated to the Confederation of Independent Football Associations (ConIFA).

== Matabeleland Football Confederacy ==
The team is run by Matabeleland Football Confederacy which was founded in 2016. The Matabeleland Football Confederacy is administered by the Save Matabeleland Coalition. Matabeleland Football Confederacy is an independent football association promoting football in Matabeleland. The Confederacy is open to all clubs and soccer associations in Matabeleland provided they subscribe to the Constitution of MFC. Its objectives being development through sport, Soccer for human rights Community Development. Career grooming and exposure. International Representation. The Confederacy was founded in 2016 by Busani Sibindi who is its president. The Technical Director who is also a co-founder is Busani Khanye.

== History ==
The team were originally scheduled to play their first official friendly against Darfur on 10 December 2017, however travel problems led to the game being cancelled. Nevertheless, because of results in unofficial games against club sides, Matabeleland still gathered enough points to qualify for the 2018 ConIFA World Football Cup in London.

In 2022, Matabeleland entered the CONIFA African Cup, drawing 1–1 to Yoruba Nation and beating eventual winners Biafra FC 1–0. They lost the final game 1–0 to Biafra to get 2nd place in the competition.

== Conifa World Football Cup Participation ==
Matabeleland have played in the 2018 ConIFA World Football Cup qualification. Matabeleland participated in its maiden major Tournament, the CONIFA World Football Cup to be held in London from 31 May to 10 June 2018. As part of the promotion for the tournament, sponsors Paddy Power launched a competition to design the kit Matabeleland will wear during the competition. With English coach Justin Walley at the helm, it was previously announced that former Liverpool great Bruce Grobbelaar would work as goalkeeping coach while FC Halifax Town and current Zimbabwe international Cliff Moyo would appear for the side. However, when the final squad was announced, Moyo did not appear.

At the tournament, Matabeleland experienced a testing first game, losing 6–1 to Padania, while Thabiso Ndlela scored their first competitive goal. A final game victory over Tuvalu delivered a record 3–1 win with Shylock Ndlovu scoring a brace, pitting them against Algerian region Kabylia in the first placement round. Despite a strong performance, the Matabeleland side fell 4–3 on penalties. However, boosted by the appearance of Zimbabwean legend Bruce Grobbelaar, two 1–0 victories followed against Chagos Islands (replacing the expelled Ellan Vannin) and Tamil Eelam as the African team eventually finished 13th in the overall tournament rankings.

At the end of the tournament, English coach Justin Walley stepped down as manager, while the MFC announced the formation of a women's team and participation in the 2018 Human Rights Cup.

== Conifa African Cup Participation ==
Matabeleland competed in 2022 CONIFA African Cup. They drew their first game against Yoruba Nation, drawing 1–1. They beat Biafra FF 1–0 to qualify for the final, where they played Biafra FF again. They lost 1–0 and finished 2nd in CONIFA African Cup

== International record ==
=== At CONIFA World Football Cup ===
Year	Position	P	W	D	L	GF	GA
ConIFA World Football Cup
(Sápmi) 2014	Not a CONIFA Member						
(Abkhazia) 2016	did not qualify						
(Barawa) 2018	13th	5	2	1	2	5	12
(North Macedonia) 2020	Cancelled due to COVID-19						
(Kurdistan Region) 2024	Cancelled due to security concerns						
Total		5	2	1	2	5	12

=== CONIFA African Football Cup ===
Year	Position	P	W	D	L	GF	GA
CONIFA African Football Cup
(South Africa) 2022	2nd	3	1	1	1	2	2
Total		3	1	1	1	1	2

== Current squad ==
The following players were called up to the 2018 ConIFA World Football Cup. Caps and goals correct as of 30 May 2018.

Note: While ConIFA accepts unofficial games as caps, Matabeleland's first officially recognised game was 31 May 2018 against Padania.

No.	Pos.	Player	Date of birth (age)	Caps	Goals	Club
1	GK	Thandazani Mdlongwa	8 January 1988 (age 38)	18	0	(Zimbabwe Football Association) Victory United
29	GK	Notice Dube	26 November 1988 (age 37)	7	0	(Zimbabwe Football Association) Makomo FC
13	GK	Bruce Sithole	7 April 1991 (age 35)	1	0	Unattached
96	GK	Bruce Grobbelaar	6 October 1957 (age 69)	1	0	Retired
4	DF	Khulekani Maziwa	15 September 1988 (age 38)	24	7	Unattached
12	DF	Sipho Mlalazi	14 September 1991 (age 35)	20	9	Unattached
14	DF	Praise Ndlovu (captain)	12 July 1993 (age 33)	20	0	Unattached
6	DF	Mthulisi Mbizo	24 September 1994 (age 32)	17	1	(Zimbabwe Football Association) Lupane State
2	DF	Michael Sibindi	13 September 1992 (age 34)	9	0	Unattached
15	DF	Mthulusi Dube	8 September 1995 (age 31)	3	0	Unattached
10	MF	Oscar George	7 January 1996 (age 30)	24	6	Unattached
7	MF	Andisiwe Sibindi	14 June 1986 (age 40)	19	1	Unattached
17	MF	Thomas Nkomo	25 September 1989 (age 37)	18	5	Unattached
3	MF	Bekithemba Moyo	25 April 1987 (age 39)	16	11	Unattached
8	MF	Sawusani Mudimba	12 May 1997 (age 29)	10	13	(Zimbabwe Football Association) FMSA Umguza
11	MF	Romeo Sibanda	1 April 1990 (age 36)	4	0	Unattached
5	MF	Godwin Ndlovu	11 December 1988 (age 37)	3	0	Unattached
16	MF	Musa Sthamburi	28 November 1996 (age 29)			
22	FW	Mduduzi Mpofu	30 September 1996 (age 30)	23	13	(Zimbabwe Football Association) Victory United
21	FW	Professor Tshuma	27 April 1990 (age 36)	23	10	Unattached
18	FW	Shylock Ndlovu	8 March 1990 (age 36)	10	8	Unattached
19	FW	Thabiso Ndlela	10 September 1996 (age 30)	8	7	Unattached
20	FW	Dumenkosini Ndlovu	1 August 1996 (age 30)	7	3	(Zimbabwe Football Association) CIWU
