= 2022 CONIFA South America Football Cup =

Tournament details
- Host country: Chile (location)
- Dates: 17–19 June 2022
- Teams: 4
- Venue(s): 1 (in 1 host city)

Final positions
- Champions: Maule Sur
- Runners-up: Mapuche
- Third place: Aymara

Tournament statistics
- Matches played: 3
- Goals scored: 6 (2 per match)
- Top scorer(s): Gabriel Loncomilla (2 goals)

The 2022 CONIFA South America Football Cup, also referred to as 2022 CONIFA Copa America, was the first edition of the CONIFA South America Football Cup, an international football tournament for states, minorities, stateless peoples and regions unaffiliated with FIFA with an affiliation to South America, organised by CONIFA. It was hosted by Chile.

== Tournament ==
On 24 January 2022, CONIFA announced that Chile would host the first edition of the CONIFA South America Football Cup.

=== Venues ===
The tournament was held in the city of Linares and all games were held in the Estadio Fiscal de Linares.

=== Mascot ===
The tournaments official mascot is Dromig, representing one of the 4 marsupials that live in Chile, its name derives from Dromiciops griloides.

== Participants ==
A total of four teams were scheduled to participate:

Team
Aymara
Mapuche
Maule Sur
~~(São Paulo (state)) São Paulo FAD~~

On 11 June, a draw was held to define the competition brackets.

== Matches ==
=== Bracket ===
The tournament's original formula would be held with semi-finals and final

Semi-finals
17 June – Linares
Mapuche	0
Maule Sur	1
18 June – Linares
Aymara
~~(São Paulo (state)) São Paulo FAD~~

Final
19 June – Linares
Maule Sur
Third place
19 June – Linares
Mapuche

=== Semi-finals ===
17 June 2022
19:00 CLT (UTC−4)

Mapuche	0–1	Maule Sur
		Acuña 80'

Estadio Fiscal de Linares

18 June 2022
15:30 CLT (UTC−4)

Aymara	Cancelled	~~(São Paulo (state)) São Paulo FAD~~

Estadio Fiscal de Linares

=== Third-Place play-off ===
19 June 2022
15:00 CLT (UTC−4)

Mapuche	Cancelled

Estadio Fiscal de Linares

=== Final ===
19 June 2022
12:00 CLT (UTC−4)

Maule Sur	Cancelled

Estadio Fiscal de Linares
1. Due to the excess of ice on the roads that connect the south of Chile, São Paulo FAD team was not able to arrive in time for the competition dispute, therefore the dispute form was changed to a triangular one with simple round-robin.

=== Round-robin ===
After the non-attendance of São Paulo FAD the tournament was decided in a single round-robin format. The match between Maule Sur and Mapuche, initially valid for one of the semi-finals, started to be considered as the first round of the dispute.

Team	Pts	P	W	D	L	GF	GA	GD
Maule Sur	6	2	2	0	0	2	0	+2
Mapuche	3	2	1	0	1	3	2	+1
Aymara	0	2	0	0	2	1	4	-3

17 June 2022
19:00 CLT (UTC−4)

Mapuche	0–1	Maule Sur
		Acuña 80'

Estadio Fiscal de Linares

18 June 2022
15:00 CLT (UTC−4)

Mapuche	3–1	Aymara
Tramanil; Loncomilla		Álvares

Estadio Fiscal de Linares

19 June 2022
12:00 CLT (UTC−4)

Maule Sur	1–0	Aymara
Arrue 84'

Estadio Fiscal de Linares

== Top scorers ==
2 goals

- Gabriel Loncomilla

1 goal

- Luis Álvares
- Yerson Tramanil
- Erick Acuña
- Cristián Arrue

== See also ==
- CONIFA
