= Rosario Licata =

Italian footballer

Personal information
- Date of birth: 16 January 1989 (age 37)
- Place of birth: Sciacca, Italy
- Height: 1.84 m (6 ft 0 in)
- Position: Defender

Team information
- Current team: Unitas Sciacca

Senior career*
Years	Team	Apps	(Gls)
2006–2007	Campobello di Mazara	15	(?)
2007–2013	Udinese	0	(0)
2009–2010	→ SPAL (loan)	10	(0)
2010–2011	→ Como (loan)	15	(1)
2011–2012	→ Viareggio (loan)	17	(0)
2012–2013	→ Portogruaro (loan)	7	(0)
2013–2014	Foggia	10	(1)
2014	Sorrento	2	(0)
2014–2015	Ribera	18	(3)
2015–2016	Folgore Selinunte	14	(3)
2016	Marsala	11	(1)
2016–2018	Mazara	43	(5)
2018–2019	Cavese	13	(0)
2019–2021	Akragas	31	(2)
2021–	Unitas Sciacca	0	(0)

International career
2022–	Sicily	1	(0)
- * Club domestic league appearances and goals as of 28 January 2019

Rosario Licata (born 16 January 1989) is an Italian footballer who plays as a defender for Italian Eccellenza Sicily club Unitas Sciacca.

== Career ==
Born in Sciacca, Sicily, Licata was a player for Campobello di Mazara in 2006–07 Serie D. From 2007 to 2009, he was a player for the reserve team of Udinese Calcio.

Licata left for SPAL in July 2009. In July 2010, he joined Como along with Francesco Bossa. Licata was the starting defender for Como in first half of the season, which he made 9 starts. He only played 4 times in the second half of the season due to injury. In summer 2011, he was signed by Viareggio. Licata was a player for Portogruaro in 2012–13 Lega Pro Prima Divisione. Licata returned to Udine again on 1 July 2013. He was the member of Udinese B team in 2013 pre-season, which against Udinese A on 28 July and Clodiense on 4 August. On 5 August, he was on trial at Lega Pro 2nd Division newcomer Foggia. On 31 January 2014, he was signed by fellow fourth division club Sorrento. Both clubs had to finish 8th or above in order to avoid relegation to Serie D, as at the end of season the prime division and the second division of Lega Pro would be merged, thus Serie D would be the fourth division of the whole system again, be remain amateur (de facto semi-pro).

From 2014 to 2018, he played for several Serie D and Eccellenza (fourth- and fifth-tear) teams.

On 12 August 2018, he signed with Serie C club Cavese.

On 21 August 2019, he joined fifth-tier Eccellenza side Akragas.
