= Confederation of Independent Football Associations =

International body for association football teams not affiliated with FIFA

- Formation: 15 August 2013; 13 years ago
- Type: Sports governing body
- Headquarters: Luleå, Norrbotten, Sweden
- Members: 38 member associations
- Official languages: English is the official language for minutes, correspondence, and announcements. French, German, Swedish, Italian, and Spanish are additional languages.
- President: (Sweden) Per-Anders Blind
- Website: CONIFA.org

The Confederation of Independent Football Associations (CONIFA, originally styled ConIFA) is the international governing body for association football teams that are not affiliated with FIFA.

== Competitions ==
Map of CONIFA tournaments

Men's World Football Cup
Women's World Football Cup
Asian Football Cup
European Football Cup

=== Men's competitions ===
- CONIFA Men's World Football Cup
- CONIFA African Football Cup
- CONIFA Asian Football Cup
- CONIFA European Football Cup
- CONIFA No Limits European Championship
- CONIFA South American Football Cup

=== Women's competition ===
- CONIFA Women's World Football Cup

=== Futsal competition ===
- CONIFA No Limits Mediterranean Futsal Cup

=== Former (or one-off) competitions ===
- Givova Trophy

=== Current title holders ===
Competition	Year	Champions	Title	Runners-up	Next edition
World Championships
CONIFA Men's World Football Cup	2018	Kárpátalja	1st	Northern Cyprus	TBD
CONIFA Women's World Football Cup	2024	Sápmi	2nd	Tamil Eelam	2027 28 May - 5 June
Men's Continental Championships
CONIFA African Football Cup	2022	Biafra	1st	Matabeleland	2026 19-24 October
CONIFA Asian Football Cup	2025	Tamil Eelam	2nd	East Turkestan	TBD
CONIFA European Football Cup	2026	Northern Cyprus	1st	Padania	TBD
CONIFA South American Football Cup	2022	Maule Sur	1st	Mapuche	TBD
Women's Continental Championships
CONIFA African Women's Football Cup					2026 19-24 October
CONIFA European Women's Football Cup					2027 May-June
No Limits Championships
CONIFA No Limits European Championship	2019	Monaco	1st	Padania	TBD
CONIFA No Limits Mediterranean Futsal Cup	2021	County of Nice	1st	Sardinia	TBD

=== Women's football ===
All members of CONIFA are encouraged to invest in women's football in their communities, and to create female national selections to play and compete against other CONIFA members.

CONIFA's first ever official women's football match took place on 10 November 2018 in Northern Cyprus, with Sápmi ladies beating their Northern Cyprus hosts 4–0 in the Women's Friendship Cup. CONIFA announced their first Women's World Football Cup on 31 January 2021, to be hosted by Székely Land between 23 and 30 June 2021 and involve 6 teams.

=== Futsal Tournament ===
The first futsal Tournament was the 2021 CONIFA No Limits Mediterranean Futsal Cup which was held in Italy and consisted of disabled futsal teams near the Mediterranean Sea.

== Members ==
=== Types of members ===
CONIFA expressly uses the term "members" rather than "countries" or "states". A football association may be eligible to apply for membership of CONIFA if it, or the entity (ethnic or linguistic minority, indigenous group, cultural organization, territory) it represents, is not a member of FIFA and satisfies one or more of the following criteria:

- The football association is a member of one of the six continental confederations of FIFA, which are: AFC, CAF, CONCACAF, CONMEBOL, OFC, UEFA.
- The entity represented by the football association is a member of the International Olympic Committee.
- The entity represented by the football association is a member of one of the member federations of Association of IOC Recognised International Sports Federations (ARISF).
- The entity represented by the football association is in possession of an ISO 3166-1 country code.
- The entity represented by the football association is a de facto independent territory. A territory is considered de facto independent if it meets all of the following criteria: (a) a well-defined territory; (b) a permanent population; (c) an autonomous government, and (d) diplomatic recognition by at least one of the member states of the United Nations.
- The entity represented by the football association is included on the United Nations list of non-self-governing territories.
- The entity represented by the football association is included in the directory of countries and territories of the Travelers' Century Club.
- The entity represented by the football association is a member of the Unrepresented Nations and Peoples Organization (UNPO) and/or the Federal Union of European Nationalities (FUEN).
- The entity represented by the football association is a minority included in the World Directory of Minorities and Indigenous Peoples, maintained and published by Minority Rights Group International.
- The entity represented by the football association is a linguistic minority, the language of which is included on the list of ISO 639-2 codes.
- The entity represented by the Football Association is a territory or people defined by an ethnic, regional or historical cultural identity and which has formed through ethnical, historical and/or regional specializations.

=== List of members ===
==== Current members ====
As of April 2026:

Africa (2)
Kabylie
Ni-Wakati Sports FC

Asia (11)
East Turkestan
Girl Power Organization (Afghanistan)
Hmong FF
Kashmir
Khalistan
Kurdistan Region
Panjab
(Palestine) Palestinian Refugee Football Initiative
Rojava
Tamil Eelam
Tibet

Europe (18)
Abkhazia
(Italy) Agro Pontino
Canton Ticino
Chameria
Cornwall
(Republic of Ireland) Cumann Sacair Gaeilge
Ellan Vannin
Gozo
Greenland
Kárpátalja
Northern Cyprus
Occitania
Padania
Raetia
Provence
Sápmi
Székely Land
Two Sicilies

North America (3)
National Association of Mexican Football
Cascadia
Indigenous Sport Council of Alberta

Oceania (2)
Hawaiʻi
West Papua

South America (2)
Aymara
São Paulo F.A.D.^^

==== Former members ====
Africa (12)
Barawa
Barotseland
Biafra
Chagos Islands
Darfur
Katanga
Lesotho
Matabeleland
Sahrawi Arab Democratic Republic
Somaliland
Yoruba
Zanzibar

Asia (8)
Arameans Suryoye
Karen
Lezghian
Pakistan Football Association^
Rohingya
Ryūkyū
United Koreans in Japan

Europe (21)
Artsakh
Cilento
County of Nice
Délvidék
Donetsk People's Republic
Elba
Franconia
Felvidék
Heligoland
Lazistan
Luhansk People's Republic
Monaco
Parishes of Jersey
Romani people
Sardinia
Sicily
Skåneland
South Ossetia
Transnistria
Western Armenia
Yorkshire

North America (4)
Esperantujo
Kiskeya
Kuskatan
Quebec

Oceania (3)
Kiribati
Mariya
Tuvalu

South America (4)
Armenian Argentine community
Rapa Nui
(Guna Yala) Guna people
Maule Sur

^^ The Girl Power Organisation and the Pakistan Football Association are breakaway football associations in Afghanistan and Pakistan respectively. Both of those countries also have state-backed football associations—the Afghanistan Football Federation and the Pakistan Football Federation—which are members of FIFA.

^^ The Federação Alternativa de Desporto de Estado de São Paulo (or São Paulo F.A.D.) is an independent regional football association dedicated to celebrating the culture and the people of the state of São Paulo. The state also has an official football association, the Federação Paulista de Futebol, which is affiliated with the Brazilian Football Confederation, which in turn is a member of FIFA.

== Leadership ==
=== President ===
President of CONIFA
No.	Name	Country of origin	Took office	Left office
1	Per-Anders Blind	Sweden	7 June 2013	Incumbent

=== Vice-Presidents ===
Vice-Presidents of CONIFA
No.	Name	Country of origin	Took office	Left office
1	Malcolm Blackburn	Isle of Man	2014	2016
2	Kristof Wenczel	Hungary	2015	Incumbent
3	Dimitri Pagave	Abkhazia	2016	Incumbent

=== General Secretaries ===
General Secretaries of CONIFA
No.	Name	Country of origin	Took office	Left office
1	Sascha Düerkop	Germany	7 June 2013	30 April 2020
2	Jason Heaton	England	30 April 2020	2 August 2021
3	Piotr Podlewski	Poland	2 August 2021	7 August 2022
4	Jeroen Zandberg	Netherlands	7 August 2022	Incumbent

=== African Presidents ===
African Presidents of CONIFA
No.	Name	Country of origin	Took office	Left office
1	Masoud Attai	Zanzibar	7 June 2013	2017
2	Justin Walley	England	2017	2020
3	Christian Lubasi Luzongo Kalalaluka	Zambia	2020	2022
4	Ngala Maimo Wajiri	Cameroon	2022	Incumbent

=== Asian Presidents ===
Asian Presidents of CONIFA
No.	Name	Country of origin	Took office	Left office
1	Tariq Abdulrahman	Iraq	7 June 2013	2017
2	Jens Jockel	Germany	2017	2020
3	Motoko Jitsukawa	Japan	2020	2022
4	Ruby-Ann Kagaoan	Philippines	2022	Incumbent

=== European President ===
European President of CONIFA
No.	Name	Country of origin	Took office	Left office
1	Alberto Rischio	Italy	7 June 2013	Incumbent

=== Latin American Presidents ===
Latin American Presidents of CONIFA
No.	Name	Country of origin	Took office	Left office
1	Jens Jockel	Germany	2013	2017
2	Zam Gutierrez	Mexico	2017	2019
3	Diego Bartolotta	Mexico	2019	Incumbent

=== Northern America and the Caribbean Presidents ===
Northern America and the Caribbean Presidents of CONIFA
No.	Name	Country of origin	Took office	Left office
1	Mark Dieler	Germany	2013	2017
2	Noah Wheelock	Canada	2017	2020
3	Aaron Johnsen	United States	2020	2024
4	Shaun Harris	United States	2024	2025
5	Jaclyn Guenette	Canada	2025	Incumbent

=== Oceanian Presidents ===
Oceanian Presidents of CONIFA
No.	Name	Country of origin	Took office	Left office
1	Charles Reklai Mitchell	Palau	2014	2017
2	Ben Schultz	Australia	2017	Incumbent

=== Directors of Women’s Football ===
Directors of Women's Football
No.	Name	Country of origin	Took office	Left office
–	Cassie Childers	United States	6 September 2017	2019
1	Kelly Lindsey	United States	February 2019	28 February 2020
2	Håkan Kuorak	Sweden	28 February 2020	2022
3	Alary Dalton	United States	2022	2024
4	Norma Alvares Aguilera	Mexico	2024	Incumbent

== See also ==
- N.F.-Board, the predecessor of non-FIFA football
- Non-FIFA international football
- World Unity Football Alliance – several CONIFA members held membership of WUFA
