= Abkhazia national football team results (2012–2019) =

This article provides details of international football games played by the Abkhazia national football team from 2012 to 2019.

== Results ==
Key
Win
Draw
Defeat

=== 2012 ===
23 June Friendly	Abkhazia	2–1	(Russia) FC Kuban Krasnodar	Sukhumi, Abkhazia
		Report		Stadium: Republican Stadium

25 September Friendly	Abkhazia	1–1	Nagorno-Karabakh	Sukhumi, Abkhazia
	Gublia 75'	Report	Barikyan 80'	Stadium: Republican Stadium; Referee: Serhiy Streletskyi (Ukraine)

21 October Friendly	Nagorno-Karabakh	3–0	Abkhazia	Stepanakert, Azerbaijan
		Report		Stadium: Stepanakert Republican Stadium

=== 2013 ===
23 September Friendly	Abkhazia	3–0	South Ossetia	Sukhumi, Abkhazia
	Dzeniya; Bondarenko (pen.); Tania	Report		Stadium: Republican Stadium

=== 2014 ===
1 June 2014 ConIFA WC GS	Abkhazia	1–1	Occitania	Östersund, Sweden
16:00 UTC+2	Hernandez 83' (o.g.)		Martinez 68'	Stadium: Jämtkraft Arena

2 June 2014 ConIFA WC GS	Abkhazia	2–1	Sápmi	Östersund, Sweden
16:00 UTC+2	Vardania 19'; Argun 72'		Kanth 51'	Stadium: Jämtkraft Arena

4 June 2014 ConIFA WC QF	Abkhazia	0–0 (0–2 p)	South Ossetia	Östersund, Sweden
13:00 UTC+2				Stadium: Jämtkraft Arena
	Penalties
	Agrba (penalty missed) Tsveyba (penalty missed) Akhba (penalty missed) Zhanava (penalty missed)		Khadarzev (penalty missed) Siukaev (penalty scored) Karatsev (penalty missed) Kudziev (penalty scored)

5 June 2014 ConIFA WC PR1	Padania	3–3 (4–2 p)	Abkhazia	Östersund, Sweden
16:00 UTC+2	Mosti 41'; Barwuah 48'; Prandelli 90+1'		Vardania 60', 62'; Akhba 86'	Stadium: Jämtkraft Arena
	Penalties
	Rota (penalty scored) Mosti (penalty scored) Tignonsini (penalty missed) Nannini (penalty scored) Mussi (penalty scored)		Ajinjal (penalty scored) Ardzheniya (penalty missed) Tarba (penalty missed) Khoklov (penalty scored)

7 June 2014 ConIFA WC PR2	Abkhazia	0–1	Occitania	Östersund, Sweden
16:00 UTC+2			Hernandez 78'	Stadium: Jämtkraft Arena

4 October Friendly	Abkhazia	1–0	Chechnya	Sukhumi, Abkhazia
				Stadium: Republican Stadium

=== 2015 ===
19 March Friendly	Abkhazia	1–0	Luhansk PR	Sukhumi, Abkhazia
				Stadium: Republican Stadium

14 May Friendly	Abkhazia	1–0	Donetsk PR	Sukhumi, Abkhazia
				Stadium: Republican Stadium

19 May Friendly	Abkhazia	0–0	Donetsk PR	Sukhumi, Abkhazia
				Stadium: Dinamo Stadium

=== 2016 ===
29 May 2016 ConIFA WC GS	Abkhazia	9–0	Chagos Islands	Sukhumi, Abkhazia
20:00 UTC+4	Kortava 18' (pen.); Argun 19'; Akhba 34'; Prus 39', 43'; Shoniya 47', 57'; Tarba 50'; Pimpia 88'	Report		Stadium: Dinamo Stadium

31 May 2016 ConIFA WC GS	Western Armenia	0–1	Abkhazia	Sukhumi, Abkhazia
20:00 UTC+4			Kortava 9'	Stadium: Dinamo Stadium

1 June 2016 ConIFA WC QF	Abkhazia	2–0	Sápmi	Sukhumi, Abkhazia
20:00 UTC+4	Kortava 35', 73' (pen.)			Stadium: Dinamo Stadium

4 June 2016 ConIFA WC SF	Northern Cyprus	0–2	Abkhazia	Sukhumi, Abkhazia
20:00 UTC+4			Logua 9'; Shoniya 69'	Stadium: Dinamo Stadium

5 June 2016 ConIFA WC F	Abkhazia	1–1 (6–5 p)	Panjab	Sukhumi, Abkhazia
20:00 UTC+4	Shoniya 88'	Report	Purewal 57'	Stadium: Dinamo Stadium
	Penalties
	A. Khagba (penalty scored); Khagush (penalty missed); Akhba (penalty missed); T. Khagba (penalty scored); Shoniya (penalty scored); Khugaev (penalty scored); Logua (penalty scored); Argun (penalty scored)		Purewal (penalty scored); Virk (penalty scored); Singh (penalty scored); Shanker (penalty missed); Dhillon (penalty missed); Basi (penalty scored); Sandhu (penalty scored); Minhas (penalty missed)

=== 2017 ===
28 May Friendly	Abkhazia	1–2	Donetsk PR	Sukhumi, Abkhazia
				Stadium: Dinamo Stadium

5 June 2017 ConIFA EC GS	Abkhazia	2–1	South Ossetia	Kyrenia, Cyprus
20:00 UTC+3	Kortava 1'; Shoniya 90+1'		Kadjaev 61'	Stadium: Mete Adanır Stadium

6 June 2017 ConIFA EC GS	Kárpátalja	2–2	Abkhazia	Kyrenia, Cyprus
20:00 UTC+3	Roland 33'; Roman 77'		Semyonov 20', 50'	Stadium: Mete Adanır Stadium

7 June 2017 ConIFA EC GS	Northern Cyprus	0–0	Abkhazia	Morphou, Cyprus
20:00 UTC+3				Stadium: Üner Berkalp Stadium

9 June 2017 ConIFA EC SF	Padania	0–0 (6–5 p)	Abkhazia	Kyrenia, Cyprus
20:00 UTC+3				Stadium: Mete Adanır Stadium

10 June 2017 ConIFA EC 3rd	Székely Land	3–1	Abkhazia	Kyrenia, Cyprus
18:00 UTC+3	Csürös 9'; Szőcs 24'; Bajkó 36'		Kortava 3'	Stadium: Mete Adanır Stadium

=== 2018 ===
31 May 2018 ConIFA WC GS	Abkhazia	3–0	Tibet	Enfield, England
12:00 UTC+1	Akhvlediani 12'; Maskayev 61'; Shoniya 77'	Report		Stadium: Queen Elizabeth II Stadium; Referee: Raymond Mashamba

2 June 2018 ConIFA WC GS	Abkhazia	0–2	Kárpátalja	Enfield, England
14:00 UTC+1		Report	Gajdos 11'; Sándor 90+8'	Stadium: Queen Elizabeth II Stadium; Referee: Dmitrii Zhukov

3 June 2018 ConIFA WC GS	Abkhazia	2–2	Northern Cyprus	Enfield, England
15:00 UTC+1	Maskayev 21'; Argun 90' (pen.)	Report	Kaya 27'; Oshan 77'	Stadium: Queen Elizabeth II Stadium; Referee: Dmitrii Zhukov

5 June 2018 ConIFA WC PR1	Abkhazia	6–0	Tamil Eelam	Aveley, England
15:00 UTC+1	Akhvlediani 40', 71'; Logua 63'; Shoniya 74', 88'; Tarba 83'	Report		Stadium: Parkside; Referee: Karl Parker

7 June 2018 ConIFA WC PR2	Abkhazia	2–0	United Koreans in Japan	Bromley, England
12:00 UTC+1	Akhvlediani 38'; Kogoniya 78'	Report		Stadium: Hayes Lane; Referee: Karl Parker

9 June 2018 ConIFA WC PR3	Kabylia	0–2	Abkhazia	Aveley, England
15:00 UTC+1		Report	Logua 29'; Zhanaa 56'	Stadium: Parkside; Referee: Kristian Michel

8 August Friendly	Abkhazia	4–0	Nigeria	Sukhumi, Abkhazia
				Stadium: Dinamo Stadium

=== 2019 ===
2 June 2019 ConIFA EC GS	Abkhazia	3–1	Chameria	Askeran, Azerbaijan
16:00 UTC+4	Maskayev 48'; Logua 49', 74'		Prendi 30'	Stadium: Askeran City Stadium; Attendance: 500; Referee: Ahmed Sabah Radha Ahmed

3 June 2019 ConIFA EC GS	Sápmi	0–1	Abkhazia	Martakert, Azerbaijan
18:00 UTC+4			Dgebuadze 45+2'	Stadium: Vigen Shirinyan Stadium; Attendance: 1,200; Referee: Ahmed Sabah Radha Ahmed

4 June 2019 ConIFA EC GS	Artsakh	1–1	Abkhazia	Martuni, Azerbaijan
18:00 UTC+4	Mkrtchyan 33'	Report	Logua 8'	Stadium: Avakyan Arena; Attendance: 1,080; Referee: Dmitrii Zhukov

6 June 2019 ConIFA EC SF	Abkhazia	1–1 (0–3 p)	Western Armenia	Stepanakert, Azerbaijan
18:30 UTC+4	Khugaev 33'		Manoyan 32' (pen.)	Stadium: Stepanakert Republican Stadium; Attendance: 7,000; Referee: Ivan Mrkalj

8 June 2019 ConIFA EC 3rd	Abkhazia	0–0 (5–4 p)	Chameria	Stepanakert, Azerbaijan
				Stadium: Stepanakert Republican Stadium; Attendance: 6,200; Referee: Dmitrii Zhukov

== Record by opponent ==
Team	Pld	W	D	L	GF	GA	GD	WPCT
Artsakh (Note: Artsakh was known as Nagorno-Karabakh in 2012.)	3	0	2	1	2	5	−3	0.00
Chagos Islands	1	1	0	0	9	0	+9	100.00
Chameria	2	1	1	0	3	1	+2	50.00
Chechnya	1	1	0	0	1	0	+1	100.00
Donetsk PR	3	1	1	1	2	2	0	33.33
Kabylia	1	1	0	0	2	0	+2	100.00
Kárpátalja	2	0	1	1	2	4	−2	0.00
(Russia) Kuban Krasnodar	1	1	0	0	2	1	+1	100.00
Luhansk PR	1	1	0	0	1	0	+1	100.00
Nigeria	1	1	0	0	4	0	+4	100.00
Northern Cyprus	3	1	2	0	4	2	+2	33.33
Occitania	2	0	1	1	1	2	−1	0.00
Padania	2	0	2	0	3	3	0	0.00
Panjab	1	0	1	0	1	1	0	0.00
Sápmi	3	3	0	0	5	1	+4	100.00
South Ossetia	3	2	1	0	5	1	+4	66.67
Székely Land	1	0	0	1	1	3	−2	0.00
Tamil Eelam	1	1	0	0	6	0	+6	100.00
Tibet	1	1	0	0	3	0	+3	100.00
United Koreans in Japan	1	1	0	0	2	0	+2	100.00
Western Armenia	2	1	1	0	2	1	+1	50.00
Total	36	18	13	5	61	27	+34	50.00

Source: Results

== See also ==
- Abkhazia national football team results (unofficial matches)
- Abkhazia national football team results (2020–present)
