= 2019 CONIFA European Football Cup squads =

Below are the squads for the 2019 CONIFA European Football Cup, held in Abkhazia from 2–9 June 2019. Although the tournament was originally scheduled to include 12 teams, withdrawals from Sardinia, County of Nice, Luhansk PR and Donetsk PR led to the tournament being reduced to 8 teams. Squads were published on the eve of the tournament in late May 2019.

== Group A ==
=== Artsakh ===
Head coach: Slavik Gabrielyan

No.	Pos.	Player	Date of birth (age)	Caps	Goals	Club
1	GK	Erik Khachatryan	5 January 1998 (aged 21)			
2	FW	Marat Karapetyan	17 May 1991 (aged 28)			
3	DF	Artur Abrahamyan	2 May 1997 (aged 22)			
4	DF	Armen Abrahamyan	25 August 1997 (aged 21)			
5	DF	Gevorg Poghosyan	26 August 1986 (aged 32)			Free agent
6	DF	Aram Kostandyan	20 June 1989 (aged 29)			
7	MF	Gor Poghosyan	11 June 1988 (aged 30)			(Football Federation of Armenia) FC Ararat Yerevan
8	MF	Mher Mkrtumyan	3 July 1986 (aged 32)			
9	FW	Levon Grigoryan	23 September 1989 (aged 29)			
10	MF	Arsen Sargsyan	8 March 1983 (aged 36)			
11	FW	Karen Shakhkeldyan	8 November 1993 (aged 25)			Free agent
12	GK	Sergey Asryan	2 January 1993 (aged 26)			
13	MF	Tigran Hambardzumyan	2 April 1997 (aged 22)			
14	MF	Khoren Veranyan	4 September 1985 (aged 33)			(Football Federation of Armenia) Shirak SC
15	MF	Dmitri Malyaka	15 January 1990 (aged 29)			Free agent
17	DF	Vadim Hayriyan	6 April 1997 (aged 22)			(Football Federation of Armenia) Artsakh FC
18	MF	Artyom Gevorkyan	21 May 1993 (aged 26)			(Football Federation of Armenia) Shirak SC
19	MF	Narek Danielyan	23 September 1990 (aged 28)			
20	FW	Norik Mkrtchyan	9 March 1997 (aged 22)			Free agent
21	DF	Davit Harutyunyan	14 December 1994 (aged 24)			Free agent
22	GK	Stepan Ghazaryan	11 January 1985 (aged 34)			(Football Federation of Armenia) FC Banants
45	FW	Davit Ghandilyan	4 June 1993 (aged 25)			(Football Federation of Armenia) Shirak SC
96	DF	Orbeli Hambardzumyan	26 March 1996 (aged 23)			(Football Federation of Armenia) FC Ararat Yerevan

=== Abkhazia ===
Head coach: Beslan Ajinjal

No.	Pos.	Player	Date of birth (age)	Caps	Goals	Club
1	GK	Inal Katsuba	21 September 1995 (aged 23)			(Football Federation of Abkhazia) Nart Sukhum
3	DF	Georgi Zhanaa	28 January 1995 (aged 24)			(Football Federation of Abkhazia) Nart Sukhum
4	DF	Lev Tarba	2 December 1999 (aged 19)			(Football Federation of Abkhazia) Nart Sukhum
5	DF	Lev Baburin	7 November 1997 (aged 21)			(Russian Football Union) Baltika-M Kaliningrad
6	MF	Timur Agrba	1 December 1999 (aged 19)			(Football Federation of Abkhazia) Nart Sukhum
7	MF	Shabat Logua	23 March 1995 (aged 24)			(Football Federation of Abkhazia) Nart Sukhum
8	MF	Tarash Khagba	4 January 1991 (aged 28)			(Football Federation of Abkhazia) FC Gagra
9	MF	Giga Benidze	18 September 1998 (aged 20)			(Football Federation of Abkhazia) Nart Sukhum
10	MF	Viktor Pimpiia	15 December 1998 (aged 20)			(Football Federation of Abkhazia) FC Ritsa
11	MF	Gudisa Smyr	6 March 2000 (aged 19)			(Russian Football Union) Druzhba Maykop
12	MF	Alan Khugayev	31 August 1991 (aged 27)			(Russian Football Union) Spartak Vladikavkaz
13	DF	Astamur Thishba	23 February 1988 (aged 31)			(Football Federation of Abkhazia) FC Gagra
14	FW	Danilo Ardzinba	27 May 1999 (aged 20)			(Russian Football Union) Strogino Moscow
15	FW	Dmitri Maskayev	27 December 1987 (aged 31)			(Russian Football Union) Lada
16	GK	Ilia Shcherba	29 March 1990 (aged 29)			(Football Federation of Abkhazia) FC Gagra
17	MF	Danil Chirikbaia	27 February 2000 (aged 19)			(Russian Football Union) Strogino Moscow
21	MF	Daur Chanba	7 July 2000 (aged 18)			(Football Association of Serbia) FK Teleoptik
22	DF	Georgiy Dgebuadze	7 June 1998 (aged 20)			(Russian Football Union) BaltAvto FK
23	MF	Aka Zvanbaia	28 October 1992 (aged 26)			(Football Federation of Abkhazia) Afon (Athos)
77	FW	Ramin Bartsits	26 January 1999 (aged 20)			(Football Federation of Abkhazia) FC Gagra

=== Chameria ===
Head coach: Bardhil Minxhaj

No.	Pos.	Player	Date of birth (age)	Caps	Goals	Club
1	GK	Fatjon Çollari	2 April 1999 (aged 20)			(Albanian Football Federation) KF Elbasani
2	MF	Xhorxhian Boçi	14 February 1994 (aged 25)			(Albanian Football Federation) KS Iliria
3	DF	Jurgen Vogli	12 June 1993 (aged 25)			(Albanian Football Federation) FK Egnatia
4	DF	Feliks Cane	28 October 1990 (aged 28)			(Albanian Football Federation) KS Devolli
5	MF	Rei Zaimi	30 October 1998 (aged 20)			(Albanian Football Federation) KF Gramshi
6	DF	Fravjo Prendi	12 October 1995 (aged 23)			(Albanian Football Federation) KF Tërbuni Pukë
7	MF	Klajdi Kryemadhi	9 December 1998 (aged 20)			(Albanian Football Federation) KS Besëlidhja Lezhë
8	MF	Kevis Gjeçi	26 August 1996 (aged 22)			(French Football Federation) FC Espaly
9	FW	Marko Çema	16 January 1998 (aged 21)			(Albanian Football Federation) FK Dinamo Tirana
10	FW	Samet Gjoka	9 January 1990 (aged 29)			(Albanian Football Federation) Luzi United
11	MF	Tedi Baholli	24 January 1990 (aged 29)			(Albanian Football Federation) Luzi United
19	MF	Vilson Mziu	15 July 1991 (aged 27)			(Albanian Football Federation) Luzi United
20	FW	Shyqyri Hasa	17 October 1996 (aged 22)			(Albanian Football Federation) Luzi United
21	FW	Anxhelo Isaraj	25 December 1991 (aged 27)			(Albanian Football Federation) KF Tërbuni Pukë
22	FW	Edmond Hoxha	16 May 1997 (aged 22)			(Albanian Football Federation) KS Besëlidhja Lezhë

=== Sápmi ===
Head coach: Jon Steinar Eriksen

No.	Pos.	Player	Date of birth (age)	Caps	Goals	Club
1	GK	Anton Sarri	3 October 1997 (aged 21)			(Swedish Football Association) Sollentuna FK
2	DF	Joona Lahdenmäki	27 February 2002 (aged 17)			(Football Association of Finland) RoPS
3	DF	Kristoffer Edvardsen	21 November 2000 (aged 18)			(Norwegian Football Federation) Ishavsbyen FK
5	DF	Dan Michael Randa	8 December 1989 (aged 29)			(Norwegian Football Federation) Bjørnevatn IL
6	MF	Asgeir Eliasen	22 February 2001 (aged 18)			(Norwegian Football Federation) Kirkenes IF
7	DF	Jirijoonas Kanth	16 June 1987 (aged 31)			Free agent
8	MF	Benjamin Zakrisson	27 October 1999 (aged 19)			(Swedish Football Association) Täfteå IK
9	MF	Rickard Hans Ellingsen	19 April 1996 (aged 23)			(Norwegian Football Federation) Tverrelvdalen IL
10	FW	Stein Arne Mannsverk	4 July 1998 (aged 20)			(Norwegian Football Federation) Tverrelvdalen IL
11	DF	Tuomas Leppäkangas	15 March 2001 (aged 18)			(Football Association of Finland) RoPS
12	FW	Jari Barsk	19 April 1984 (aged 35)			(Football Association of Finland) FC Kiffen 08
13	MF	Mika Holmen Haetta	9 January 2003 (aged 16)			(Norwegian Football Federation) Kautokeino IL
14	MF	Johan Ante Andersen Eira	25 August 2003 (aged 15)			(Norwegian Football Federation) Kautokeino IL
15	MF	Samuli Laitila	23 June 1993 (aged 25)			(Football Association of Finland) LPS
16	FW	John Mathis Haetta Gaup	1 March 1998 (aged 21)			(Norwegian Football Federation) Ishavsbyen FK
17	DF	Jarkko Lahdenmäki	16 April 1991 (aged 28)			Free agent
18	DF	Mikael Jannok	21 June 1989 (aged 29)			(Swedish Football Association) Gällivare Malmbergets FF
20	GK	Alexander Ellingsen	2 July 1997 (aged 21)			(Norwegian Football Federation) Tverrelvdalen IL

== Group B ==
=== Padania ===
Head coach: Arturo Merlo

No.	Pos.	Player	Date of birth (age)	Caps	Goals	Club
1	GK	Federico Del Frate	21 January 1995 (aged 24)	0	0	(Italian Football Federation) Borgosesia
2	DF	Michele Bonfanti	7 January 1992 (aged 27)	0	0	(Italian Football Federation) Arconatese
3	DF	Giorgio Belotti	26 November 1998 (aged 20)	0	0	(Italian Football Federation) Telgate
4	MF	Gianluca Rolandone	19 January 1989 (aged 30)	12	1	(Italian Football Federation) Nuorese
5	DF	Stefano Tignonsini	25 November 1981 (aged 37)	22	2	(Italian Football Federation) Pro Sesto
6	DF	Alessandro Moretti	28 January 1997 (aged 22)	0	0	(Italian Football Federation) Adrense
7	FW	Riccardo Ravasi	7 December 1994 (aged 24)	3	2	(Italian Football Federation) Borgosesia
8	MF	Andrea Rota	10 October 1976 (aged 42)	23	8	(Italian Football Federation) Virtus Garda Grummelese
9	FW	Federico Corno	6 April 1989 (aged 30)	4	3	(Italian Football Federation) Caronnese
10	FW	Niccolò Colombo	13 December 1990 (aged 28)	0	0	(Italian Football Federation) Castanese
11	FW	Gabriele Piantoni	11 September 1988 (aged 30)	9	2	(Italian Football Federation) Virtus Garda Grummelese
12	GK	Francesco Gaione	27 July 1993 (aged 25)	0	0	(Italian Football Federation) Derthona
13	MF	Mattia Monopoli	9 March 1998 (aged 21)	0	0	(Italian Football Federation) OltrepòVoghera
15	DF	Nicolò Pavan	11 September 1993 (aged 25)	5	2	(Italian Football Federation) Caronnese
16	FW	Dario Mastrototaro	8 January 1993 (aged 26)	0	0	(Italian Football Federation) Vigor Carpaneto
17	DF	Marius Stankevičius	15 July 1981 (aged 37)	6	0	(Italian Football Federation) Crema
18	FW	Stanislav Bahirov	22 April 1998 (aged 21)	0	0	(Italian Football Federation) Virtus Garda Grummelese
19	MF	Marco Garavelli	4 March 1981 (aged 38)	15	5	(Italian Football Federation) Busca
20	MF	Marco Taino	21 April 1993 (aged 26)	0	0	(Italian Football Federation) Varesina

=== South Ossetia ===
Head coach: Soslan Kochiev

No.	Pos.	Player	Date of birth (age)	Caps	Goals	Club
1	GK	Ruslan Murtazov	11 March 2003 (aged 16)			(South Ossetia Football Association) Spartak Tskhinvali
2	DF	Akhsar Dzhioev	19 December 1987 (aged 31)			(South Ossetia Football Association) Spartak Tskhinvali
3	DF	Aleksei Muldarov	24 April 1984 (aged 35)			(South Ossetia Football Association) Spartak Tskhinvali
4	DF	Atsamaz Bekoev	7 January 1994 (aged 25)			(South Ossetia Football Association) Spartak Tskhinvali
6	MF	Radion Vazagov	22 February 1999 (aged 20)			(Russian Football Union) Spartak Vladikavkaz
7	FW	Batradz Gurtsiev	12 December 1998 (aged 20)			(Russian Football Union) FC Chayka Peschanokopskoye
10	MF	Gamat Doguzov	19 May 2002 (aged 17)			(South Ossetia Football Association) Spartak Tskhinvali
11	MF	Dzambolat Khastsayev	22 February 1995 (aged 24)			(Russian Football Union) Spartak Vladikavkaz
13	DF	Azamat Kokoyev	22 January 1998 (aged 21)			(South Ossetia Football Association) Spartak Tskhinvali
14	DF	Timur Sokolov	2 June 1983 (aged 35)			(South Ossetia Football Association) Spartak Tskhinvali
15	MF	Marat Beteev	8 January 1993 (aged 26)			(South Ossetia Football Association) Spartak Tskhinvali
16	MF	Soslanbeg Dzagoev	12 February 1998 (aged 21)			(Crimea Football Association) Kyzyltash Bakhchisaray
17	MF	Mirza Alborov	17 December 1987 (aged 31)			(South Ossetia Football Association) Ossetia Shield
20	FW	Mikhail Gagloev	16 July 1997 (aged 21)			(South Ossetia Football Association) Spartak Tskhinvali
23	MF	Batradz Tedeev	1 November 1995 (aged 23)			(Crimea Football Association) Inkomsport Yalta
25	MF	Georgy Kabulov	23 November 1989 (aged 29)			(Russian Football Union) FC Mashuk-KMV Pyatigorsk
27	MF	Arsen Kaytov	2 July 1989 (aged 29)			(Russian Football Union) FC Armavir
33	DF	Soslan Kabulov	15 August 1993 (aged 25)			(South Ossetia Football Association) Spartak Tskhinvali
71	GK	Muharbeg Buraev	29 April 1997 (aged 22)			(Russian Football Union) Spartak Vladikavkaz
77	FW	Ibragim Bazayev	30 August 1989 (aged 29)			(South Ossetia Football Association) Spartak Tskhinvali
88	MF	Soslan Djidjoev	10 August 1997 (aged 21)			(South Ossetia Football Association) Spartak Tskhinvali
99	DF	Stanislav Tedeev	6 July 1996 (aged 22)			(South Ossetia Football Association) Spartak Tskhinvali

=== Székely Land ===
Head coach: József Gazda

No.	Pos.	Player	Date of birth (age)	Caps	Goals	Club
1	GK	Levente Mihok	27 May 1982 (aged 37)	0	0	(Romanian Football Federation) ACS Olimpic Cetate Râșnov
2	DF	Hunor Ghinea	24 February 1999 (aged 20)	0	0	(Romanian Football Federation) KSE Târgu Secuiesc
3	DF	Robert Oprea	10 June 1988 (aged 30)	4	0	(Romanian Football Federation) SK Nyárádszereda
4	DF	Norbert Lazar	27 April 1989 (aged 30)	0	0	(Romanian Football Federation) Baróti VSC
5	MF	István Hadnagy	19 September 1996 (aged 22)	4	1	(Romanian Football Federation) Malomfalvi Fiatalság
6	MF	Norbert-Cristian Albu	1 November 1996 (aged 22)	0	0	(Romanian Football Federation) KSE Târgu Secuiesc
7	MF	Barna Vékás	12 August 1994 (aged 24)	6	5	(Romanian Football Federation) AFC Odorheiu Secuiesc
8	MF	Csaba Dézsi	13 December 1989 (aged 29)	4	0	(Romanian Football Federation) AFC Odorheiu Secuiesc
9	FW	Ákos Kovács	22 March 1983 (aged 36)	8	1	(Romanian Football Federation) AFC Odorheiu Secuiesc
10	MF	Mozes Peter	30 December 1984 (aged 34)	8	2	(Romanian Football Federation) AFC Odorheiu Secuiesc
11	FW	Szilárd Magyari	20 May 1998 (aged 21)	9	6	(Romanian Football Federation) FK Miercurea Ciuc
12	GK	Attila Farkas	22 March 1999 (aged 20)	0	0	(Romanian Football Federation) KSE Târgu Secuiesc
13	FW	Attila Lazar	10 July 1989 (aged 29)	0	0	(Romanian Football Federation) Baróti VSC
14	DF	Árpád Rózsa	18 June 1989 (aged 29)	15	0	Free agent
15	DF	Norbert Benkő-Bíró	8 October 1992 (aged 26)	14	1	(Hungarian Football Federation) Salgótarjáni BTC
16	MF	Tankó Előd	13 July 1995 (aged 23)	0	0	(Romanian Football Federation) AFC Odorheiu Secuiesc
17	FW	Barna Bajkó	16 May 1984 (aged 35)	13	10	(Romanian Football Federation) FK Miercurea Ciuc
18	MF	József Gazda	26 October 1982 (aged 36)	14	0	(Romanian Football Federation) KSE Târgu Secuiesc
19	MF	Botond Kovács	10 September 1996 (aged 22)	0	0	(Hungarian Football Federation) Szolnoki MÁV FC
20	MF	Attila Gall	2 June 1996 (aged 22)	0	0	(Romanian Football Federation) KSE Târgu Secuiesc
21	MF	Gothard Gajdo	17 July 1991 (aged 27)	0	0	(Romanian Football Federation) KSE Târgu Secuiesc
22	FW	Rajmond Bálint	8 December 1993 (aged 25)	1	0	(Romanian Football Federation) AFC Odorheiu Secuiesc
23	FW	Norbert János	30 May 1998 (aged 21)	0	0	(Romanian Football Federation) FC Universitatea Cluj

=== Western Armenia ===
Head coach: Harutyun Vardanyan

No.	Pos.	Player	Date of birth (age)	Caps	Goals	Club
1	GK	Gevorg Kasparov	25 July 1980 (aged 38)			(Football Federation of Armenia) Gandzasar Kapan
2	DF	Hrayr Mkoyan	2 September 1986 (aged 32)			(Football Federation of Armenia) Alashkert
3	DF	Fabrice Guzel	9 November 1990 (aged 28)			(Swiss Football Association) Nyon
4	DF	Rafael Safaryan	30 January 1986 (aged 33)			(Football Federation of Armenia) Ararat Yerevan
5	DF	Raffi Kaya	8 June 1994 (aged 24)			(Swiss Football Association) Lancy
6	DF	Vardan Arzoyan	30 April 1995 (aged 24)			(Football Federation of Armenia) Ararat Yerevan
7	DF	Argishti Petrosyan	16 October 1991 (aged 27)			(Football Federation of Armenia) Artsakh
8	MF	Artur Yedigaryan	26 June 1987 (aged 31)			(Football Federation of Armenia) Alashkert
9	MF	David Azin	11 January 1990 (aged 29)			(Football Federation of Armenia) Ararat Yerevan
10	FW	David Hovsepyan	15 January 1991 (aged 28)			(Cyprus Football Association) Enosis Neon THOI Lakatamia
11	MF	Herant Yagan	1 October 1993 (aged 25)			(Royal Belgian Football Association) KSC Grimbergen
12	GK	Khachik Hovsepyan	15 January 1991 (aged 28)			(Football Federation of Armenia) Ararat Yerevan
13	MF	Ghukas Poghosyan	6 February 1994 (aged 25)			(Football Federation of Armenia) Alashkert
14	FW	Gevorg Nranyan	9 May 1986 (aged 33)			(Football Federation of Armenia) Gandzasar Kapan
15	FW	Vardan Bakalyan	4 April 1995 (aged 24)			(Football Federation of Armenia) Artsakh
16	MF	Davit Minasyan	9 March 1993 (aged 26)			(Football Federation of Armenia) Gandzasar Kapan
17	DF	Aghvan Davoyan	21 March 1990 (aged 29)			(Football Federation of Armenia) Shirak
18	MF	Arman Aslanyan	30 January 1994 (aged 25)			(Football Federation of Armenia) Shirak
19	FW	Zaven Badoyan	22 December 1989 (aged 29)			(Football Federation of Armenia) Ararat Yerevan
20	MF	Benik Hovhannisyan	1 May 1988 (aged 31)			(Football Federation of Armenia) Artsakh
21	MF	Armen Derdzyan	17 November 1993 (aged 25)			(Football Federation of Armenia) Junior Sevan
22	DF	Artyom Mikaelyan	12 July 1991 (aged 27)			(Football Federation of Armenia) Shirak
