= Chameria national football team =

Unofficial national football team representing the region of Chameria

Chameria
- Association: Federata e Futbollit të Republikës së Çamërisë (FFRÇ)
- Confederation: CONIFA
- Head coach: Arben Kasolli
First colours

First international
- Chameria 6–0 Kurdistan Region (The Hague, Netherlands; 17 June 2017)

Biggest win
- Chameria 6–0 Kurdistan Region (The Hague, Netherlands; 17 June 2017)

Biggest defeat
- Abkhazia 3–1 Chameria (Askeran, Republic of Artsakh; 2 June 2019)

CONIFA European Football Cup
- Appearances: 1 (first in 2019)
- Best result: 4th, (2019)

The Chameria national football team (Albanian: Përfaqësuesja e futbollit së Çamërisë) represents Cham Albanians of Chameria, a coastal part of Epirus, Greece. It is not affiliated with FIFA or UEFA and therefore cannot compete for the FIFA World Cup or the UEFA European Championship.

== History ==
=== First match ===
The Chameria national football team was formed during mid-2017 and has played a number of friendly matches. On 17 June 2017, the first one that was simultaneously also the first biggest win and the first-ever competitive win was against Kurdistan Region in the framework of the 2017 Unrepresented Nations Cup and the match ended with a 6–0 home win.

=== Membership in CONIFA ===
On 24 May 2018, Chameria was accepted in CONIFA and would now play in the various tournaments and individual matches against other national teams.

On 2 June 2019, Chameria played its first international match after the membership in CONIFA against Abkhazia in the framework of the 2019 CONIFA European Football Cup and the match ended in a 3–1 defeat, that was simultaneously also the biggest defeat and the first defeat of Chameria.

In 2023, Chameria participated in the 2024 CONIFA World Cup Qualification. They were placed in Group C with Sekler Land and Two Sicilies. Chameria ended up losing 3-2 to Sekler Land, but bounced back and beat Two Sicilies 3-1, which qualified them through to the main tournament.

== Competitive record ==
=== CONIFA World Football Cup ===
CONIFA World Football Cup record										Qualifying record					
Year	Round	Pos	Pld	W	D	L	GF	GA	Squad	Pld	W	D	L	GF	GA
(Sápmi) 2014	Team did not exist														
(Abkhazia) 2016	Team did not exist														
(Barawa) 2018	Not a CONIFA member														
(North Macedonia) 2020	Cancelled due to COVID-19 pandemic														
(Kurdistan Region) 2024	Qualified									2	1	0	1	5	4
Total	—	1/5	0	0	0	0	0	0	—	2	1	0	1	5	4

=== UNPO World Cup ===
UNPO World Cup record
Year	Round	Pos	Pld	W	D	L	GF	GA	Squad
(Netherlands) 2017	Champion	1st	3	3	0	0	12	3	
Total	—	1/1	3	3	0	0	12	3	—

=== CONIFA European Football Cup ===
On 20 February 2019, in Krakow, it was decided that Chameria should be part of Group 2 of the 2019 CONIFA European Football Cup, together with Abkhazia and County of Nice. On 22 May 2019, CONIFA announced that County of Nice was withdrawing from competition and Chameria's group would include Sápmi and the host country Artsakh, as well as Abkhazia. On 2 June 2019, Chameria debuted at the CONIFA European Football Cup with an away match, losing to Abkhazia 3–1.

CONIFA European Football Cup record
Year	Round	Pos	Pld	W	D	L	GF	GA	Squad
(Székely Land) 2015 to (Northern Cyprus) 2017	Team did not exist								
(Republic of Artsakh) 2019	Fourth place	4th	5	2	2	1	9	4	Squad
Total	—	1/3	5	2	2	1	9	4	—

== Fixtures and results ==
=== 2017 ===
17 June 2017 UNPO World Cup	Chameria	6–0	Kurdistan Region	The Hague, Netherlands
11:30				Stadium: Sportpark De Verademing

17 June 2017 UNPO World Cup	Chameria	3–1	Ambazonia	The Hague, Netherlands
13:30				Stadium: Sportpark De Verademing

17 June 2017 UNPO World Cup	Chameria	3–2	(Burundi) FC Umubano	The Hague, Netherlands
15:30				Stadium: Sportpark De Verademing

=== 2019 ===
2 June 2019 CONIFA European Cup group stage	Abkhazia	3–1	Chameria	Askeran, Republic of Artsakh
16:00	Maskayev 48'; Logua 49', 74'	Report	Prendi 30'	Stadium: Askeran City Stadium; Attendance: 500; Referee: Ahmed Sabah Radha Ahmed (Kurdistan Region)

3 June 2019 CONIFA European Cup group stage	Chameria	4–1	Artsakh	Martuni, Republic of Artsakh
18:00	Çema 58', 90+3'; Mziu 85'; Gjoka 90+5'	Report	Sargsyan 83'	Stadium: Avakyan Arena; Attendance: 1,080; Referee: Ivan Mrkalj (Germany)

4 June 2019 CONIFA European Cup group stage	Chameria	4–0	Sápmi	Martakert, Republic of Artsakh
18:00	Mziu 5'; Hoxha 22', 45'; Çema 78'	Report		Stadium: Vigen Shirinyan Stadium; Attendance: 2,300; Referee: Ivan Mrkalj (Germany)

6 June 2019 CONIFA European Cup semi-final	South Ossetia	0–0 (6–5 p)	Chameria	Askeran, Republic of Artsakh
16:00		Report		Stadium: Askeran City Stadium; Attendance: 500; Referee: Ahmed Sabah Radha Ahmed (Kurdistan Region)

8 June 2019 CONIFA European Cup third place	Abkhazia	0–0 (5–4 p)	Chameria	Stepanakert, Republic of Artsakh
		Report		Stadium: Stepanakert Republican Stadium; Attendance: 6,200; Referee: Dmytro Zhukov (Donetsk People's Republic)

=== 2023 ===
30 June 2024 CONIFA World Cup qualification	Székely Land	3–2	Chameria	Miercurea Ciuc, Romania
19:00 (CEST)	Magyari; Veres; Kovács		Sejdini; Gjeci	Stadium: Eross Zsolt Stadium

1 July 2024 CONIFA World Cup qualification	Chameria	3–1	Two Sicilies	Miercurea Ciuc, Romania
19:00 (CEST)	Sejdini; Gjoka ?', ?'		Mendil	Stadium: Eross Zsolt Stadium

== Players ==
=== Current squad ===
The following players have been called up for the 2019 CONIFA European Football Cup.

No.	Pos.	Player	Date of birth (age)	Club
1	GK	Fatjon Çollari	2 April 1999 (age 26)	(Albanian Football Federation) Elbasani
2	DF	Xhorxhian Boçi	14 February 1994 (age 31)	(Albanian Football Federation) Dinamo Tirana
3	MF	Jurgen Vogli	12 June 1993 (age 32)	(Albanian Football Federation) Egnatia
4	DF	Feliks Cane	28 October 1990 (age 35)	(Albanian Football Federation) Devolli
5	MF	Rei Zaimi	30 October 1998 (age 27)	(Albanian Football Federation) Apolonia Fier
6	DF	Flavio Prendi	12 October 1995 (age 30)	(Albanian Football Federation) Dinamo Tirana
7	MF	Klajdi Kryemadhi	9 December 1998 (age 27)	(Albanian Football Federation) Elbasani
8	MF	Kevis Gjeçi	26 August 1996 (age 29)	(French Football Federation) Espaly
9	FW	Marko Çema	16 January 1998 (age 28)	(Albanian Football Federation) Partizani Tirana B
10	FW	Samet Gjoka	9 January 1990 (age 36)	(Albanian Football Federation) Shkumbini
11	MF	Tedi Baholli	24 January 1990 (age 36)	(Albanian Football Federation) Shkumbini
19	FW	Vilson Mziu	15 July 1991 (age 34)	(Albanian Football Federation) Sopoti
20	MF	Shyqyri Hasa	17 October 1996 (age 29)	(Albanian Football Federation) Luzi 2008
21	MF	Anxhelo Isaraj	25 December 1991 (age 34)	(Albanian Football Federation) Tërbuni
22	FW	Edmond Hoxha	16 May 1997 (age 28)	(Albanian Football Federation) Besëlidhja Lezhë

== Head-to-head records against other countries ==
As of 8 June 2019

Opponent	Pld	W	D	L	GF	GA	GD	Win %
Abkhazia	2	0	1	1	1	3	−2	0.00
Ambazonia	1	1	0	0	3	1	+2	100.00
Artsakh	1	1	0	0	4	1	+3	100.00
Kurdistan Region	1	1	0	0	6	0	+6	100.00
Sápmi	1	1	0	0	4	0	+4	100.00
South Ossetia	1	0	1	0	0	0	+0	0.00
6 Countries	7	4	2	1	18	5	+13	57.14

== Managers ==
Manager	Period	Played	Won	Drawn	Lost	Win %
	2017	3	3	0	0	100.0
	2018	5	2	0	3	40.0
(Albania) Arben Kasolli	2019–	5	2	2	1	40.0
Totals		13	7	2	4	53.84
