= Arben =

Arben is an Albanian masculine given name that refers to the first Albanian entity during the Middle Ages: Principality of Arbanon (Albanian: Principata e Arbënit). Arben means serious guy/person.

- Arben Ahmetaj (born 1969), Albanian politician
- Arben Arbëri (born 1964), Albanian football player
- Arben Bajraktaraj (born 1973), French actor
- Arben Biba (born 1976), Kosovar Albanian actor
- Arben Imami (born 1958), Albanian politician
- Arben Kasolli (born 1967), Albanian football manager and former player
- Arben Krasniqi (born 1974), Kosovan basketball coach
- Arben Kucana (born 1967), Albanian sport shooter
- Arben Malaj (born 1961), Albanian politician
- Arbën Milori (born 1969), Albanian footballer
- Arben Minga (1959–2007), Albanian footballer
- Arben Muskaj (born 1994), Albanian football player
- Arbën Nuhiji (born 1972), Macedonian footballer
- Arben Puto (1924–2016), Albanian historian
- Arben Ramadani (1981–2000), Kosovar Albanian militant
- Arben Ristani (born 1969), head of the Central Election Commission of Albania
- Arben Shehu (born 1980), Albanian football striker
- Arben Taravari (born 1973), Macedonian politician
- Arben Vila (born 1961), Albanian footballer
- Arben Vitia (born 1973), Kosovar Albanian medical doctor and politician
- Arben Xhaferi (1948–2012), Albanian politician who worked in the Republic of Macedonia
- Arben Zharku (born 1982), Kosovar actor and producer

== See also ==
- Arben Broci High School, Tirana, Albania
