= South Ossetia national football team =

Unofficial national football team representing the partially recognised South Ossetia

South Ossetia
- Nickname: Red And Yellow
- Association: Football Federation of the Republic of South Ossetia
- Confederation: CONIFA
- Head coach: Soslan Kochiev
- Top scorer: Artur Elbaev (9)
- Home stadium: Guram Tskhovrebov Stadium
First colours	Second colours

First international
- Abkhazia 3-0 South Ossetia (Sukhumi, Abkhazia; 26 September 2013)

Biggest win
- South Ossetia 19-0 Darfur (Tskhinvali, South Ossetia; 3 June 2014)

Biggest defeat
- Northern Cyprus 8-0 South Ossetia (Tskhinvali, South Ossetia; 7 June 2017)

The South Ossetia National Football Team is the national team of South Ossetia. They are not affiliated with FIFA or UEFA and therefore cannot compete for the FIFA World Cup or the UEFA European Championship. South Ossetia made its debut against Abkhazia in Sukhumi on 23 September 2013 where they suffered a 3–0 defeat.

South Ossetia competed at the first ConIFA World Football Cup in 2014 finishing in fourth place overall and won the 2019 ConIFA European championship.

== History ==
The Football Federation of South Ossetia was created in 1997 and its futsal team made its official debut in the 2010 UEFS Futsal Men's Championship, finishing seventh. Two years later, it finished eighth.

The football team played its first match ever on 23 September 2013. It was a friendly match against Abkhazia and it was defeated by 0–3. One year later, it was admitted in the Confederation of Independent Football Associations and made their international debut in the 2014 ConIFA World Football Cup, where they finished in the fourth place overall.

In 2015, South Ossetia was going to make their debut in the CONIFA European Football Cup in Hungary, but their players were not allowed to travel due to pressures of the Ministry of Foreign Affairs of Georgia.

On 9 June 2019, South Ossetia won its first European Championship by defeating Western Armenia in the final.

== International record ==
=== At CONIFA World Football Cup ===
Year	Position	GP	W	D	L	GF	GA
(Sápmi) 2014	4th	5	1	1	3	21	10
(Abkhazia) 2016	did not qualify						
(Ogaden) 2018	did not qualify						
(North Macedonia) 2020	Tournament Suspended						
(Kurdistan Region) 2024	cancelled						
Total		5	1	1	3	21	10

=== At CONIFA European Football Cup ===
Year	Position	GP	W	D	L	GF	GA
(Székely Land) 2015	did not enter						
(Northern Cyprus) 2017	8th	4	0	0	4	2	16
(Republic of Artsakh) 2019	1st place, gold medalist(s)	5	3	2	0	7	4
(County of Nice) 2021	Cancelled						
(Northern Cyprus) 2023	Cancelled						
Total		9	3	2	4	9	20

== Current squad ==
The following 23 players were called up to the squad for the 2019 CONIFA European Football Cup.

No.	Pos.	Player	Date of birth (age)	Caps	Goals	Club
1	GK	Ruslan Murtazov	11 March 2003 (aged 16)			(South Ossetia Football Association) Spartak Tskhinvali
2	DF	Akhsar Dzhioev	19 December 1987 (aged 31)			(South Ossetia Football Association) Spartak Tskhinvali
3	DF	Aleksei Muldarov	24 April 1984 (aged 35)			(South Ossetia Football Association) Spartak Tskhinvali
4	DF	Atsamaz Bekoev	7 January 1994 (aged 25)			(South Ossetia Football Association) Spartak Tskhinvali
5	MF	Georgy Kabulov	23 November 1989 (aged 29)			(Russian Football Union) FC Mashuk-KMV Pyatigorsk
6	MF	Radion Vazagov	22 February 1999 (aged 20)			(Russian Football Union) Spartak Vladikavkaz
7	FW	Batradz Gurtsiev	12 December 1998 (aged 20)			(Russian Football Union) FC Chayka Peschanokopskoye
8	MF	Soslan Djidjoev	10 August 1997 (aged 21)			(South Ossetia Football Association) Spartak Tskhinvali
9	DF	Stanislav Tedeev	6 July 1996 (aged 22)			(South Ossetia Football Association) Spartak Tskhinvali
10	MF	Gamat Doguzov	19 May 2002 (aged 17)			(South Ossetia Football Association) Spartak Tskhinvali
11	FW	Dzambolat Khastsayev	22 February 1995 (aged 24)			(Russian Football Union) Spartak Vladikavkaz
12	GK	Muharbeg Buraev	29 April 1997 (aged 22)			(Russian Football Union) Spartak Vladikavkaz
13	DF	Azamat Kokoyev	22 January 1998 (aged 21)			(South Ossetia Football Association) Spartak Tskhinvali
14	DF	Timur Sokolov	2 June 1983 (aged 35)			(South Ossetia Football Association) Spartak Tskhinvali
15	MF	Marat Beteev	8 January 1993 (aged 26)			(South Ossetia Football Association) Spartak Tskhinvali
16	MF	Soslanbeg Dzagoev	12 February 1998 (aged 21)			(Crimea Football Association) Kyzyltash Bakhchisaray
17	MF	Mirza Alborov	17 December 1987 (aged 31)			(South Ossetia Football Association) Ossetia Shield
18	DF	Arsen Kaytov	2 July 1989 (aged 29)			(Russian Football Union) FC Armavir
19	DF	Soslan Kabulov	15 August 1993 (aged 25)			(South Ossetia Football Association) Spartak Tskhinvali
20	FW	Mikhail Gagloev	16 July 1997 (aged 21)			(South Ossetia Football Association) Spartak Tskhinvali
21	MF	Batradz Tedeev	1 November 1995 (aged 23)			(Crimea Football Association) Inkomsport Yalta
22	FW	Ibragim Bazayev	30 August 1989 (aged 29)			(South Ossetia Football Association) Spartak Tskhinvali

== Top goalscorers ==
Only matches at CONIFA tournaments are counted.

#	Player	Goals
1	Artur Elbaev	9
2	Batradz Gurtiev	5
2	Rustam Khutiev	5
4	Ibrahim Bagayev	2
4	Vladimir Salbiev	2

== Matches played ==
23 September 2013 Friendly	Abkhazia	3–0	South Ossetia	(Abkhazia) Sukhumi
	Dzeniya; Bondarenko (pen.); Tania	Report		Stadium: Republican Stadium

2 June 2014 2014 ConIFA WC GS	Darfur	0–19	South Ossetia	(Sápmi) Östersund
13:00			Elbaev 10', 39', 42', 62', 75', 76', 82', 88'; Salbiev 13', 40'; Kobaladze 45'; Khutiev 56', 59', 70', 79', 90'; Kudziev 63'; Kulov 68'; Tskhovrebov 90+1'	Stadium: Jämtkraft Arena

3 June 2014 2014 ConIFA WC GS	South Ossetia	1–3	Padania	(Sápmi) Östersund
13:00	Elbaev 46'		Innocenti 6'; Mussi 37'; Enoch Barwuah 86'	Stadium: Jämtkraft Arena

4 June 2014 2014 ConIFA WC QF	Abkhazia	0–0 (0–2 p)	South Ossetia	(Sápmi) Östersund
				Stadium: Jämtkraft Arena
	Penalties
	Agrba (penalty missed); Tsveyba (penalty missed); Dmitri Akhba (penalty missed); Zhanava (penalty missed)		(penalty missed) Khadarzev; (penalty scored) Siukaev; (penalty missed) Karatsev; (penalty scored) Kudziev

6 June 2014 2014 ConIFA WC SF	County of Nice	3–0	South Ossetia	(Sápmi) Östersund
14:00	Tchokounte 3', 28'; Puyoo 83'			Stadium: Jämtkraft Arena

8 June 2014 2014 ConIFA WC 3rd	South Ossetia	1–4	Arameans Suryoye	(Sápmi) Östersund
10:00	Siukaev 92'		Kacho 9', 24', 73'; Percin 47'	Stadium: Jämtkraft Arena

5 June 2017 2017 ConIFA EC GS	Abkhazia	2–1	South Ossetia	(Northern Cyprus) Kyrenia
20:00	Kortava 1'; Shoniya 90+1'		Kadjaev 61'	Stadium: Mete Adanır Stadium

6 June 2017 2017 ConIFA EC GS	South Ossetia	0–8	Northern Cyprus	(Northern Cyprus) Kyrenia
20:00			Yaşınses 13'; Taşkıran 15', 20', 58'; Çıdamlı 57', 68'; Turan 62' (pen.); Gök 88'	Stadium: Mete Adanır Stadium

7 June 2017 2017 ConIFA EC GS	South Ossetia	1–4	Kárpátalja	(Northern Cyprus) Famagusta
20:00	Kochiev 85'		Mile 20'; Baksa 33'; Barta 45+1'; Kész 62'	Stadium: Dr. Fazıl Küçük Stadium

9 June 2017 2017 ConIFA EC PR	South Ossetia	0–2	Felvidék	(Northern Cyprus) Famagusta
20:00			Molnár 5', 42'	Stadium: Dr. Fazıl Küçük Stadium

2 June 2019 2019 ConIFA EC GS	Western Armenia	1–2	South Ossetia	(Republic of Artsakh) Martuni
18:00	Aslanyan 79'		Gurtsiev 29', 56'	Stadium: Avakyan Arena; Attendance: 1,080; Referee: Ahmed Sabah Radha Ahmed

3 June 2019 2019 ConIFA EC GS	South Ossetia	2–1	Padania	(Republic of Artsakh) Stepanakert
20:00	Gurtsiev 55'; Bazayev 80'	Report	Ravasi 89' (pen.)	Stadium: Stepanakert Republican Stadium; Attendance: 5,000; Referee: Dmitrii Zhukov

4 June 2019 2019 ConIFA EC GS	South Ossetia	2–2	Székely Land	(Republic of Artsakh) Askeran
16:00	Gurtsiev 72', 84'		Vékás 54'; Kovács 82'	Stadium: Askeran City Stadium; Attendance: 500; Referee: Arkadi Akobyan

6 June 2019 2019 ConIFA EC SF	South Ossetia	0–0 (6–5 p)	Chameria	(Republic of Artsakh) Askeran
16:00				Stadium: Askeran City Stadium; Attendance: 500; Referee: Ahmed Sabah Radha Ahmed

9 June 2019 2019 ConIFA EC F	Western Armenia	0–1	South Ossetia	(Republic of Artsakh) Stepanakert
18:00			Bazayev 65'	Stadium: Stepanakert Republican Stadium; Attendance: 12,000; Referee: Dmitrii Zhukov

27 August 2019 Friendly	Luhansk	4–3	South Ossetia	(Luhansk People's Republic) Luhansk
16:00		Report		Stadium: Avanhard Stadium

22 September 2019 Friendly	South Ossetia	2–0	Luhansk	(South Ossetia) Tskhinvali
15:00		Report		Stadium: Guram Tskhovrebov Stadium

== Managers ==
Manager	Period	Played	Won	Drawn	Lost	Win %
(South Ossetia) Pukhaev Ruslan	2013–2017	10	1	1	8	10.0
(South Ossetia) Soslan Kochiev	2017–	7	4	2	1	57.1
Totals		17	5	3	9	29.41

== President ==
President	Year(s)
(South Ossetia) Dzhioev Alan Amiranovich	2012–present

== Honours ==
=== Non-FIFA competitions ===
- CONIFA European Football Cup
  - Champions (1): 2019
