= Georgy Kabulov =

Russian footballer

Personal information
- Full name: Georgy Muratovich Kabulov
- Date of birth: 23 November 1989 (age 36)
- Place of birth: Tskhinvali, Georgia
- Height: 1.74 m (5 ft 9 in)
- Position: Defender

Team information
- Current team: Dynamo (Stavropol)

Senior career*
Years	Team	Apps	(Gls)
2006	Alania-D		
2007	LFC Dynamo	18	(0)
2008–2010	Kazanka	61+	(2+)
2011–2012	Tyumen-D		
2012–2014	Spartak (Kostroma)	35	(1)
2014–2015	Tavriya	25	(0)
2016	Ocean	10	(0)
2016–2021	Mashuk-KMV	90	(3)
2021–2022	Tuapse	31	(0)
2022–2023	Dynamo Stavropol	16	(0)

International career
- South Ossetia
- * Club domestic league appearances and goals

Georgy Muratovich Kabulov (Russian: Георгий Муратович Кабулов; born 23 November 1989) is a Russian former footballer who played as a defender.

== Career ==
=== Club career ===
Before the 2008 season, Kabulov signed for Russian fourth tier side Kazanka, helping them earn promotion to the Russian third tier. In 2014, he signed for Tavriya in Crimea. In 2022, he signed for Dynamo (Stavropol) in the Russian third tier.

=== International career ===
Kabul represented South Ossetia at the 2019 CONIFA European Football Cup, helping them win it.
