= Abkhazia national football team results (2020–present) =

This article provides details of international football games played by the Abkhazia national football team from 2020 to present.

== Results ==
Key
Win
Draw
Defeat

=== 2020 ===
25 September 2020 Friendly	Abkhazia	0–0	Donetsk PR	Sukhumi, Abkhazia
--:-- UTC+4		Report		Stadium: Dinamo Stadium
Note: Match Abandoned at half-time due to floodlight failure.

=== 2021 ===
11 July 2021 Friendly	Abkhazia	1–0	(Russia) PFC Sochi	Sukhumi, Abkhazia
--:-- UTC+4	Kvitsinia 54'			Stadium: Dinamo Stadium; Attendance: 2,000

=== 2022 ===
16 November 2022 Friendly	Abkhazia	1–1	Adygea	Sukhumi, Abkhazia
--:-- UTC+4	Kvitsinia 42'	Report	Delok 45'	Stadium: Dinamo Stadium

23 November 2022 Friendly	Abkhazia	2–4	Kabardino-Balkaria	Sukhumi, Abkhazia
17:00 UTC+4	Pimpiia 10'; Kvitsinia 82'		Bazhev 32'; Bekboev B 51'; Khutov 65'; Abazhev 80'	Stadium: Dinamo Stadium

== Record by opponent ==
Team	Pld	W	D	L	GF	GA	GD	WPCT
Adygea	1	0	1	0	1	1	0	0.00
Donetsk PR	1	0	1	0	0	0	0	0.00
Kabardino-Balkaria	1	0	0	1	2	4	−2	0.00
(Russia) Sochi	1	1	0	0	1	0	+1	100.00
Total	4	1	2	1	4	5	−1	25.00

Source: Results

== See also ==
- Abkhazia national football team results (unofficial matches)
- Abkhazia national football team results (2012–2019)
