= Nikita Imullin =

Russian footballer (born 1995)

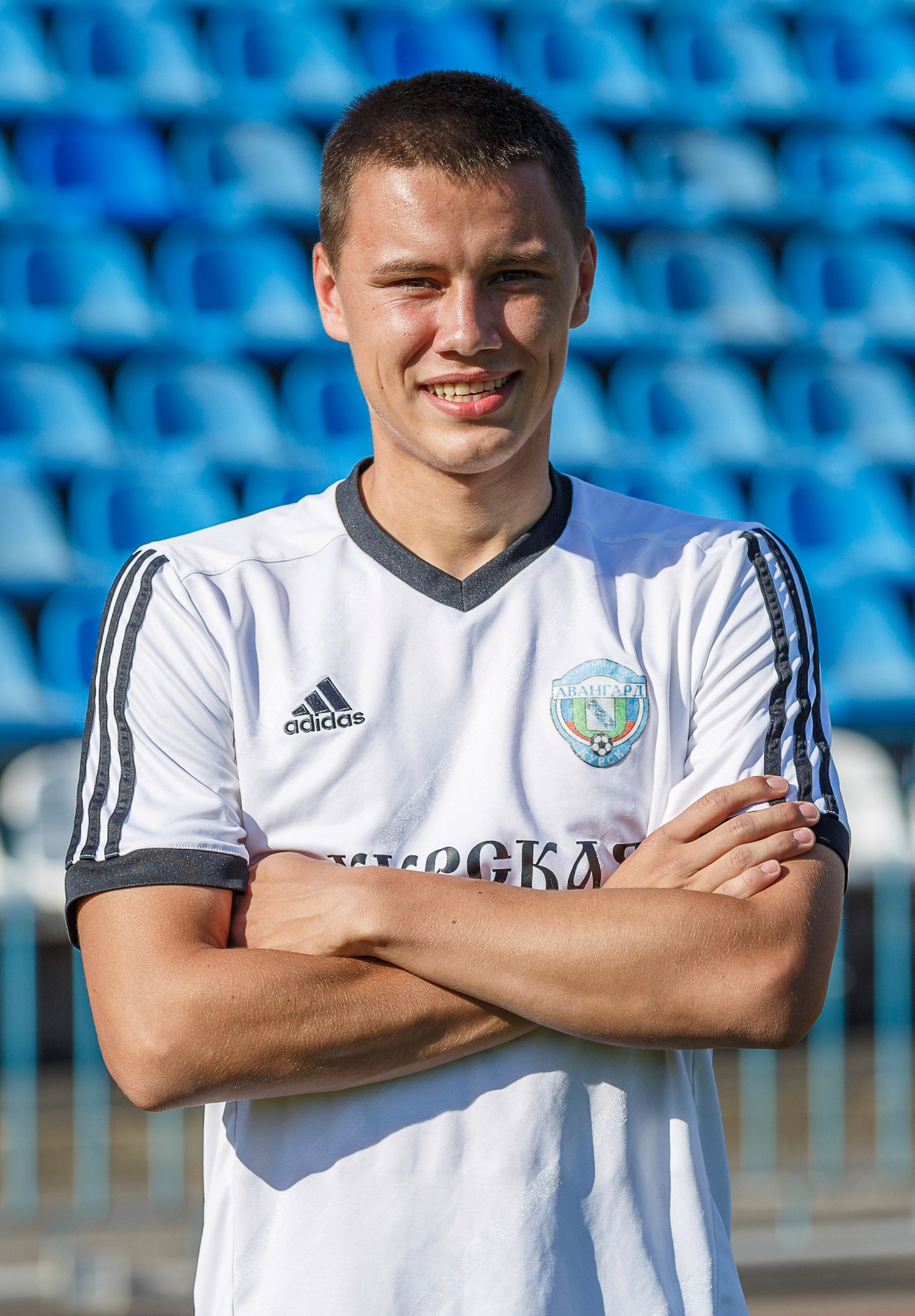
- Imullin in 2017

Personal information
- Full name: Nikita Sergeyevich Imullin
- Date of birth: 7 June 1995 (age 31)
- Place of birth: Tolyatti, Russia
- Height: 1.82 m (6 ft 0 in)
- Position: Midfielder

Youth career
- Konoplyov football academy

Senior career*
Years	Team	Apps	(Gls)
2013–2014	Lada-Tolyatti	30	(5)
2014–2015	Sokol Saratov	2	(0)
2015	→ Avangard Kursk (loan)	4	(1)
2015–2016	Dynamo Bryansk	25	(1)
2016–2017	Avangard Kursk	27	(0)
2018	Lada-Tolyatti	6	(1)
2018–2019	Syzran-2003	23	(1)
2019	Lada Dimitrovgrad	16	(0)
2020	Volga Ulyanovsk	0	(0)
2020–2021	Zenit-Izhevsk	20	(1)
2021–2024	Avangard Kursk	91	(7)

International career
2014	Russia U-19	1	(0)
- * Club domestic league appearances and goals as of 8 June 2024

Nikita Sergeyevich Imullin (Russian: Никита Серге́евич Имуллин; born 7 June 1995) is a Russian footballer who plays as midfielder.

== Club career ==
Imullin made his debut in the Russian Second Division for Lada-Tolyatti on 18 April 2013 in a game against Oktan Perm.

He made his Russian Football National League debut for Sokol Saratov on 19 July 2014 in a game against Luch-Energiya Vladivostok.
