= 2019 CONIFA European Football Cup =

Tournament details
- Host country: (Republic of Artsakh) Artsakh (official); Azerbaijan (location)
- Dates: 1–9 June 2019
- Teams: 8
- Venues: 4 (in 4 host cities)

Final positions
- Champions: South Ossetia
- Runners-up: Western Armenia
- Third place: Abkhazia
- Fourth place: Chameria

Tournament statistics
- Matches played: 20
- Goals scored: 59 (2.95 per match)
- Top scorer: (South Ossetia) Batradz Gurtsiev (5 goals)

The 2019 Sportsbet.io CONIFA European Football Cup was the third edition of the CONIFA European Football Cup, an international football tournament for states, minorities, stateless peoples and regions unaffiliated with FIFA with an affiliation to Europe, organised by CONIFA. It was hosted by Artsakh.

The goal of the tournament was scored by Sápmi player Kristoffer Edvardsen.

== Tournament ==
On 19 August 2018, CONIFA announced that Artsakh would host the 2019 edition of the tournament.

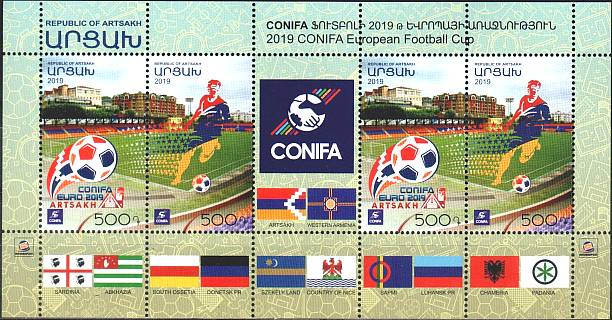
Stamp of Artsakh, CONIFA Cup 2019

The Artsakh postal authorities issued on 4 June 2019, a commemorative stamp for this occasion, which depicts as well the flags of participant teams in the tournament.

=== Venues ===
The tournament was held in 4 cities: Stepanakert (the capital), Askeran, Martakert and Martuni.

Artsakh

Stepanakert	Martakert	Martuni	Askeran
Stepanakert Republican Stadium (artificial turf)	Vigen Shirinyan Stadium (natural grass)	Avakyan Arena (artificial turf)	Askeran City Stadium (natural grass)
39.8210541°N 46.7532527°E	40.2166109°N 46.8210697°E	39.7949688°N 47.1187198°E	39.9381267°N 46.8389386°E
Capacity: 12,000	Capacity: 1,200	Capacity: 1,080	Capacity: 500
2019 CONIFA European Football Cup is located in Republic of Artsakh

== Participants ==
A total of twelve teams were scheduled to participate, with their seedings below. The seeded teams are Padania (winners of the 2017 CONIFA European Football Cup) and Artsakh, as the hosts of the 2019 European Football Cup. Abkhazia and Székely Land were also drawn as top seeds in Pot 1, based on their CONIFA rankings.

Sardinia entered in 2018 in CONIFA and it was drawn in one of the groups. However, in May 2019, it withdrew from the competition. The reserve team, in case one of the below teams withdraws, was granted to Kernow, but after County of Nice, Donetsk PR and Luhansk PR all withdrew, CONIFA opted to proceed with just 8 teams in 2 groups.

Pot 1	Pot 2	Pot 3
Artsakh; Abkhazia; Padania; Székely Land	~~County of Nice~~; ~~Donetsk PR~~; Sápmi; Western Armenia	Chameria; ~~Luhansk PR~~; ~~Sardinia~~; South Ossetia

== Matches ==
=== Group stage ===
Key to colours in group tables
Teams that advanced to the semi-finals

==== Group A ====
Team	Pld	W	D	L	GF	GA	GD	Pts
Abkhazia	3	2	1	0	5	2	+3	7
Chameria	3	2	0	1	9	4	+5	6
Artsakh	3	1	1	1	5	7	−2	4
Sápmi	3	0	0	3	2	8	−6	0

2 June 2019
16:00

Abkhazia	3–1	Chameria
Maskayev 48'; Logua 49', 74'		Prendi 30'

Askeran City Stadium, Askeran
Attendance: 500
Referee: Ahmed Sabah Radha Ahmed
2 June 2019
20:00

Artsakh	3–2	Sápmi
Mkrtchyan 3'; Sargsyan 43'; Malyaka 82'	Report	Zakrisson 24'; Edvardsen 83'

Stepanakert Republican Stadium, Stepanakert
Attendance: 12,000
Referee: Dmitrii Zhukov

3 June 2019
18:00

Chameria	4–1	Artsakh
Çema 58', 90+3'; Mziu 85'; Gjoka 90+5'	Report	Sargsyan 83'

Avakyan Arena, Martuni
Attendance: 1,080
Referee: Ivan Mrkalj
3 June 2019
18:00

Sápmi	0–1	Abkhazia
		Dgebuadze 45+2'

Vigen Shirinyan Stadium, Martakert
Attendance: 1,200
Referee: Ahmed Sabah Radha Ahmed

4 June 2019
18:00

Artsakh	1–1	Abkhazia
Mkrtchyan 33'	Report	Logua 8'

Avakyan Arena, Martuni
Attendance: 1,080
Referee: Dmitrii Zhukov
4 June 2019
18:00

Chameria	4–0	Sápmi
Mziu 5'; Hoxha 22', 45'; Çema 78'	Report

Vigen Shirinyan Stadium, Martakert
Attendance: 1,200
Referee: Ivan Mrkalj

==== Group B ====
Team	Pld	W	D	L	GF	GA	GD	Pts
South Ossetia	3	2	1	0	6	4	+2	7
Western Armenia	3	1	1	1	7	3	+4	4
Padania	3	1	1	1	6	3	+3	4
Székely Land	3	0	1	2	2	11	−9	1

2 June 2019

Padania	4–0	Székely Land
Tignonsini 7'; Corno 53', 78'; Rota 61'	Report

Vigen Shirinyan Stadium, Martakert
Attendance: 1,100
Referee: Ivan Mrkalj
2 June 2019
18:00

Western Armenia	1–2	South Ossetia
Aslanyan 79'		Gurtsiev 29', 56'

Avakyan Arena, Martuni
Attendance: 1,080
Referee: Ahmed Sabah Radha Ahmed

3 June 2019
16:00

Székely Land	0–5	Western Armenia
	Report	Badoyan 20'; Hovsepyan 52' (pen.); Bakalyan 70'; Minasyan 81'; Aslanyan 90+1'

Askeran City Stadium, Askeran
Attendance: 500
Referee: Arkadi Akobyan
3 June 2019
20:00

South Ossetia	2–1	Padania
Gurtsiev 55'; Bazayev 80'	Report	Ravasi 89' (pen.)

Stepanakert Republican Stadium, Stepanakert
Attendance: 5,000
Referee: Dmitrii Zhukov

4 June 2019
16:00

South Ossetia	2–2	Székely Land
Gurtsiev 72', 84'		Vékás 54'; B. Kovács 82'

Askeran City Stadium, Askeran
Attendance: 500
Referee: Arkadi Akobyan
4 June 2019
20:00

Padania	1–1	Western Armenia
Colombo 69'	Report	Yedigaryan 67'

Stepanakert Republican Stadium, Stepanakert
Attendance: 6,000
Referee: Ahmed Sabah Radha Ahmed

=== Knockout stage ===
==== Semi-finals ====
6 June 2019
18:30

Abkhazia	1–1	Western Armenia
Khugayev 10'		Manoyan 32' (pen.)
Penalties
	0–3

Stepanakert Republican Stadium, Stepanakert
Attendance: 7,000
Referee: Ivan Mrkalj
6 June 2019
16:00

South Ossetia	0–0	Chameria
Penalties
	6–5

Askeran City Stadium, Askeran
Attendance: 500
Referee: Ahmed Sabah Radha Ahmed

==== Third-place play-off ====
8 June 2019

Abkhazia	0–0	Chameria
Penalties
	5–4

Stepanakert Republican Stadium, Stepanakert
Attendance: 6,200
Referee: Dmitrii Zhukov

==== Final ====
9 June 2019
18:00

Western Armenia	0–1	South Ossetia
		Bazayev 65'

Stepanakert Republican Stadium, Stepanakert
Attendance: 12,000
Referee: Dmitrii Zhukov, Vitalii Mazin, Valerii Kravchenko, Aleksandr Demenko, Ivan Mrkalj

=== Placement round ===
==== Placement round 1 ====
6 June 2019
17:00

Padania	4–0	Sápmi
Colombo 4'; Corno 45', 73'; Ravasi 46' (pen.)	Report

Vigen Shirinyan Stadium, Martakert
Attendance: 1,200
Referee: René Jacobi
6 June 2019
17:00

Artsakh	2–1	Székely Land
Sargsyan 76' (pen.); Danielyan 90+4'	Report	Vékás 62'

Avakyan Arena, Martuni
Attendance: 1,080
Referee: Dmitrii Zhukov

==== Placement round 2 ====
8 June 2019

Sápmi	3–2	Székely Land
Zakrisson 17'; Laitila 19', 75'		Balint 35'; Kovacs 55' (pen.)

Askeran City Stadium, Askeran
Attendance: 500
Referee: René Jacobi
8 June 2019
11:00

Padania	0–2	Artsakh
		Sargsyan 58'; Malyaka 90+6'

Stepanakert Republican Stadium, Stepanakert
Attendance: 4,400
Referee: Ivan Mrkalj

== Final positions ==
Pos	Team	Pld	W	D	L	GF	GA	GD	Pts
1	South Ossetia	5	3	2	0	7	4	+3	11
2	Western Armenia	5	1	2	2	8	5	+3	5
3	Abkhazia	5	2	3	0	6	3	+3	9
4	Chameria	5	2	2	1	9	4	+5	8
5	Artsakh	5	3	1	1	9	8	+1	10
6	Padania	5	2	1	2	10	5	+5	7
7	Sápmi	5	1	0	4	5	14	−9	3
8	Székely Land	5	0	1	4	5	16	−11	1

Player of the tournament: Batradz Gurtsiev Young player of the tournament: Kristoffer Edvardsen

== Top scorers ==
5 goals

- (South Ossetia) Batradz Gurtsiev

4 goals

- (Padania) Federico Corno
- (Republic of Artsakh) Arsen Sargsyan

3 goals

- (Abkhazia) Shabat Logua
- Markovanbasten Çema

2 goals

- (South Ossetia) Ibragim Bazayev
- (Republic of Artsakh) Dmitri Malyaka
- (Republic of Artsakh) Norik Mkrtchyan
- Edmond Hoxha
- Vilson Mziu
- (Padania) Niccolò Colombo
- (Padania) Riccardo Ravasi
- (Sápmi) Benjamin Zakrisson
- (Sápmi) Samuli Laitila
- (Székely Land) Barna Vékás
- (Western Armenia) Arman Aslanyan

1 goal

- (Abkhazia) Georgiy Dgebuadze
- (Abkhazia) Dmitri Maskayev
- (Abkhazia) Alan Khugayev
- (Republic of Artsakh) Narek Danielyan
- Samet Gjoka
- Fravjo Prendi
- (Padania) Andrea Rota
- (Padania) Stefano Tignonsini
- (Sápmi) Kristoffer Edvardsen
- (Székely Land) Botond Kovács
- (Székely Land) Rajmond Balint
- (Székely Land) Kovács Ákos
- (Western Armenia) Zaven Badoyan
- (Western Armenia) Vardan Bakalyan
- (Western Armenia) David Hovsepyan
- (Western Armenia) Davit Minasyan
- (Western Armenia) Artur Yedigaryan
- (Western Armenia) David Manoyan

Player of the tournament: Batradz Gurtsiev

Young player of the tournament: Kristoffer Edvardsen
