= Akhba =

Akhba is a surname. Notable people with the surname include:

- Dmitry Akhba (born 1985), Russian footballer
- Igor Akhba (born 1949), Abkhazian politician
