= Vladimir Salbiyev =

Russian footballer

Personal information
- Full name: Vladimir Taymurazovich Salbiyev
- Date of birth: 29 April 1982 (age 44)
- Height: 1.78 m (5 ft 10 in)
- Position: Midfielder

Youth career
- Yunost Vladikavkaz

Senior career*
Years	Team	Apps	(Gls)
2000	Iriston Vladikavkaz	35	(9)
2001–2002	Krasnoznamensk	47	(3)
2003–2004	Don Novomoskovsk	62	(6)
2005	Slavia Mozyr	24	(3)
2006	Amur Blagoveshchensk	28	(1)
2007	Avtodor Vladikavkaz	23	(1)
2008	Olimpia Volgograd	19	(1)
2008–2009	Avtodor Vladikavkaz	43	(6)
2010–2011	FAYUR Beslan	43	(9)
2012	Mostovik-Primorye Ussuriysk	3	(0)
Total		327	(39)

International career
	South Ossetia	5	(2)
- * Club domestic league appearances and goals

Vladimir Taymurazovich Salbiyev (Russian: Владимир Таймуразович Салбиев; born 29 April 1982) is a former Russian professional footballer.
