= Abkhazia national football team results (unofficial matches) =

This article provides details of unofficial international football games played by the Abkhazia national football team from 2007 to 2017.

== Results ==
Key
Win
Draw
Defeat

=== 2007 ===
2 October Friendly	Abkhazia	4–4	(Soviet Union) USSR Veterans	Ochamchire, Abkhazia
		Report		Stadium: Vitaly Daraseliya Stadium

=== 2008 ===
27 September Friendly	Abkhazia	3–3	(Soviet Union) USSR Veterans	Sukhumi, Abkhazia
		Report		Stadium: Republican Stadium; Referee: Grigory Poghosyan (Armenia)

=== 2017 ===
9 October Friendly	Abkhazia	4–2	(Soviet Union) USSR Veterans	Ochamchire, Abkhazia
		Report

== Record by opponent ==
Team	Pld	W	D	L	GF	GA	GD	WPCT
(Soviet Union) USSR Veterans	3	1	2	0	11	9	+2	33.33
Total	3	1	2	0	11	9	+2	33.33

Source: Results

== See also ==
- Abkhazia national football team results (2012–2019)
- Abkhazia national football team results (2020–present)
