= Juma Kvaratskhelia =

Footballer from Abkhazia (born 1959)

8th Chairman of the Football Federation of Abkhazia
- Incumbent
- Assumed office 25 February 2017
- Preceded by: Ruslan Ajinjal

Personal details
- Born: 6 December 1969 (age 56) Gudauta
- Height: 1.70 m (5 ft 7 in)
- Occupation: Footballer (retired); Football manager Football administrator
Association football career
Team information
- Current team: Afon (manager); Abkhazia (manager)
Senior career*
Years	Team	Apps	(Gls)
1986–1991	FC Dinamo Sokhumi	123	(0)
1992	Tselinnik Tselinograd	35	(2)
1993	Torpedo Taganrog	13	(0)
1993	Spartak Nalchik	15	(2)
1994–1995	Uralan Elista	69	(3)
1996–1998	Lokomotiv Chita	96	(1)
2000	Zhemchuzhina Sochi	6	(0)
Managerial career
- –2013: Ritsa (Gudauta)
- 2012–2017: Abkhazia G:28 W:12 D:12 L:4
- 2013–: Afon
- * Club domestic league appearances and goals

Juma Kvaratskhelia (born 6 December 1969) is a former football player from Abkhazia and the current trainer of the Abkhazian national team and Chairman of the Football Federation of Abkhazia. He last played for FC Zhemchuzhina-Sochi in the Russian First Division.

== Career ==
In 2016, Kvaratskhelia won the ConIFA World Football Cup as manager of the Abkhazian national football team.

== President of the Football Federation of Abkhazia ==
On 24 January 2017, Ruslan Ajinjal resigned as Chairman of the Abkhazian Football Federation, and on 25 February, Kvaratskhelia was unanimously elected as his successor.
