= Ruslan Ajinjal =

Abkhaz-Russian professional footballer

- Руслан Аџьынџьал
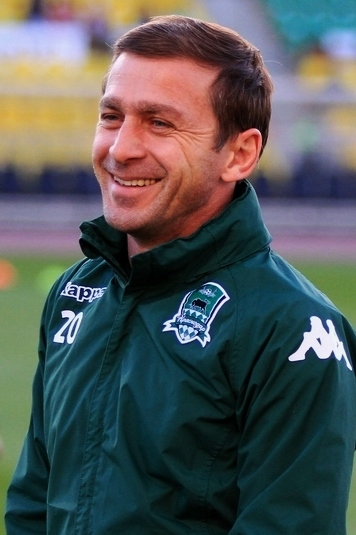
- Ajinjal with FC Krasnodar in 2015

7th Chairman of the Football Federation of Abkhazia
- In office 15 October 2015 – 24 January 2017
- Preceded by: Jemal Gubaz
- Succeeded by: Juma Kvaratskhelia

Personal details
- Born: 22 June 1974 (age 52) Gagra, Soviet Union (now Abkhazia, Georgia)
- Height: 1.68 m (5 ft 6 in)
- Occupation: Footballer (retired); Football administrator and coach
Association football career
Team information
- Current team: FC Nizhny Novgorod (assistant coach)
Senior career*
Years	Team	Apps	(Gls)
1991	Dynamo Gagra	1	(0)
1991	FC Dinamo Sukhumi	14	(1)
1992–1993	FC Druzhba Maykop	63	(11)
1994–1999	FC Baltika Kaliningrad	182	(23)
2000–2001	FC Torpedo-ZIL Moscow	51	(6)
2001–2004	FC Uralan Elista	83	(11)
2004–2005	FC Terek Grozny	49	(2)
2006–2007	FC Luch-Energiya Vladivostok	52	(2)
2008–2010	FC Krylia Sovetov Samara	67	(3)
2011–2013	FC Volga Nizhny Novgorod	63	(2)
2013–2014	FC Krylia Sovetov Samara	30	(0)
2014–2015	FC Krasnodar	9	(0)
Total		664	(61)
Managerial career
- 2018–2019: FC Murom (assistant)
- 2020–2021: Tom Tomsk (assistant)
- 2021–: FC Nizhny Novgorod (assistant)
- * Club domestic league appearances and goals

Ruslan Alekseyevich Ajinjal (Abkhaz: Руслан Аџьынџьал, Russian: Руслан Алексеевич Аджинджал; born 22 June 1974) is a football coach and a former player from Abkhazia and a former chairman of the Football Federation of Abkhazia. He is an assistant coach with FC Nizhny Novgorod. He is an identical twin brother of Beslan Ajinjal.

== Career ==
On 12 June 2014, Ajinjal signed a one-year contract with Russian Premier League team FC Krasnodar. On 7 June 2015, Ajinjal announced his retirement.

== President of the Football Federation of Abkhazia ==
On 8 September 2015, the Football Federation of Abkhazia announced that the upcoming leadership election had been moved forward to October from the Spring of 2016, so as to leave more time for the preparation of the 2016 ConIFA World Football Cup, hosted by Abkhazia. Ruslan Ajinjal became the only candidate for the post after incumbent Chairman Jemal Gubaz announced his immediate resignation on 21 September. On 15 October, Ajinjal was elected unanimously.

On 24 January 2017, Ajinjal resigned as Chairman, and on 25 February, the coach of Abkhazia's national football team Juma Kvaratskhelia was unanimously elected as his successor.
