= 2015 CONIFA European Football Cup =

2015 ConIFA European Football Cup

Tournament details
- Host country: Székely Land (official); Hungary (location)
- Dates: 17–21 June
- Teams: 6
- Venues: 2 (in 1 host city)

Final positions
- Champions: Padania
- Runners-up: County of Nice
- Third place: (Isle of Man) Ellan Vannin
- Fourth place: Felvidék

Tournament statistics
- Matches played: 11
- Goals scored: 54 (4.91 per match)
- Top scorer(s): Franck Delerue (5 goals)

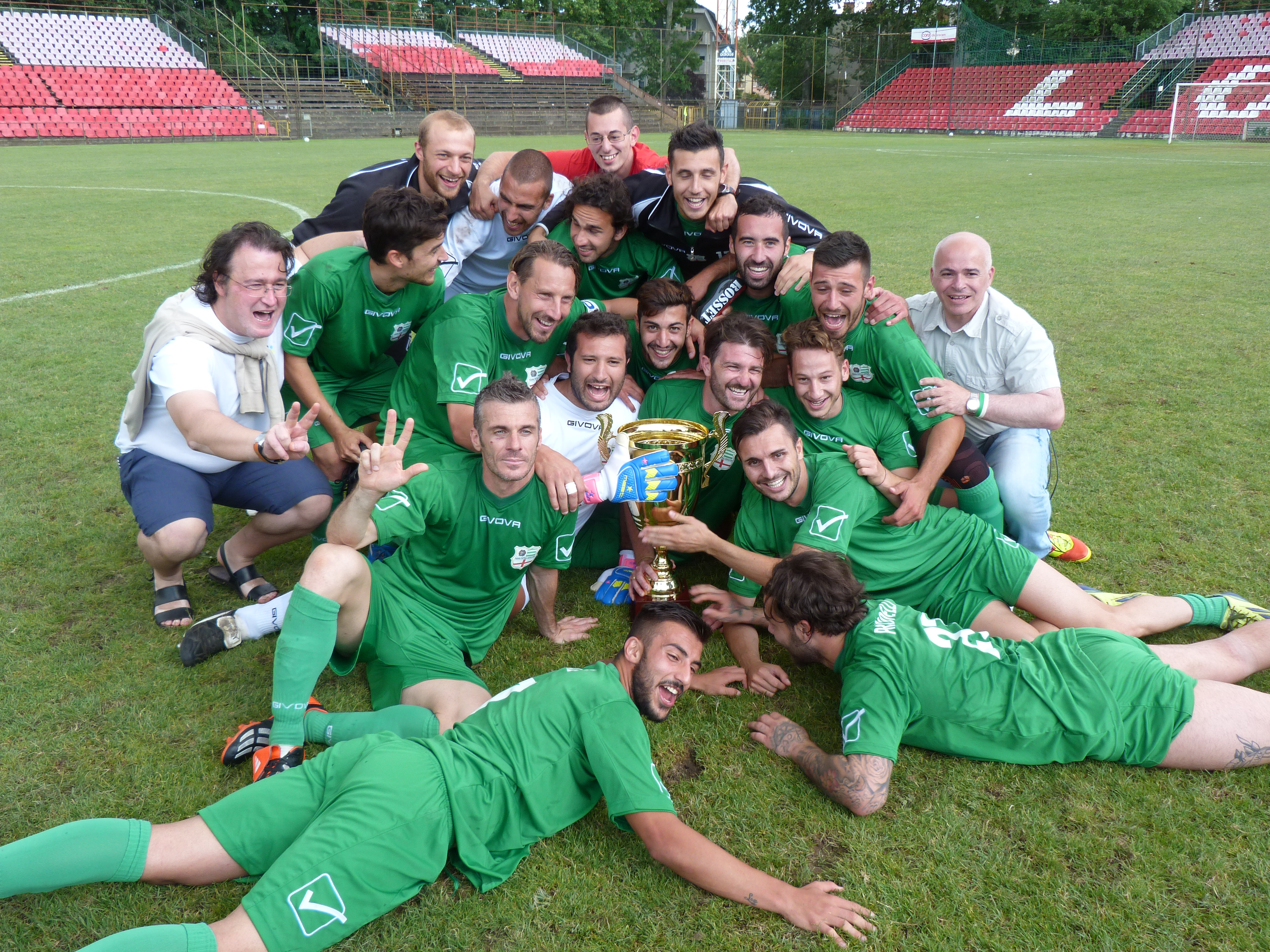
Padánia - Debrecen, 2015.06.21

The 2015 ConIFA European Football Cup was the first edition of the ConIFA European Football Cup, an international football tournament for states, minorities, stateless peoples and regions unaffiliated with FIFA organised by CONIFA. The tournament was originally planned to be hosted by Ellan Vannin on the Isle of Man; this expanded to then see the group games and placement rounds held in South East England, while the semi-finals, third-place play-off and final would take place in Douglas. However, in March 2015, at the draw for the tournament, it was announced that the tournament would no longer be held in the Isle of Man, instead moving to be hosted by new entrant Székely Land in Hungary. In 2015, ConIFA announced that the tournament would serve as part of the qualification process for the 2016 ConIFA World Football Cup, with the top three teams qualifying automatically.

== Tournament ==
In June 2014, following the success of the first ConIFA World Football Cup, CONIFA announced that a European international tournament would be held under its auspices in 2015. On the announcement, three CONIFA members applied to host the first European Football Cup, Abkhazia, Nagorno-Karabakh and Ellan Vannin. Ellan Vannin was announced as the host in August 2014.

=== Hosts ===
As initially planned, the tournament was to take place wholly on the Isle of Man, with The Bowl, the main stadium on the island, holding all matches. However, the Isle of Man TT races were scheduled for the period of 30 May to 12 June 2015, the day prior to the start of the tournament. As a consequence of the unexpected interest in the tournament, with a consequent lack of hotel and ferry space for both spectators at the TT races and fans wishing to attend the European Football Cup, CONIFA took the decision to restructure the tournament, with the group and placement games to be held at venues in and around London between 14 and 18 June, and The Bowl to be used for the semi-finals and final on the 20 and 21 June. In February 2015, soon after the announcement that the tournament would be split between the Isle of Man and Southern England, the two venues chosen for the group phase of the competition were confirmed as the Kingfield Stadium and Paddy Power Park, respectively the home grounds of Woking, of the Conference National, and Farnborough, who play in the Conference South.

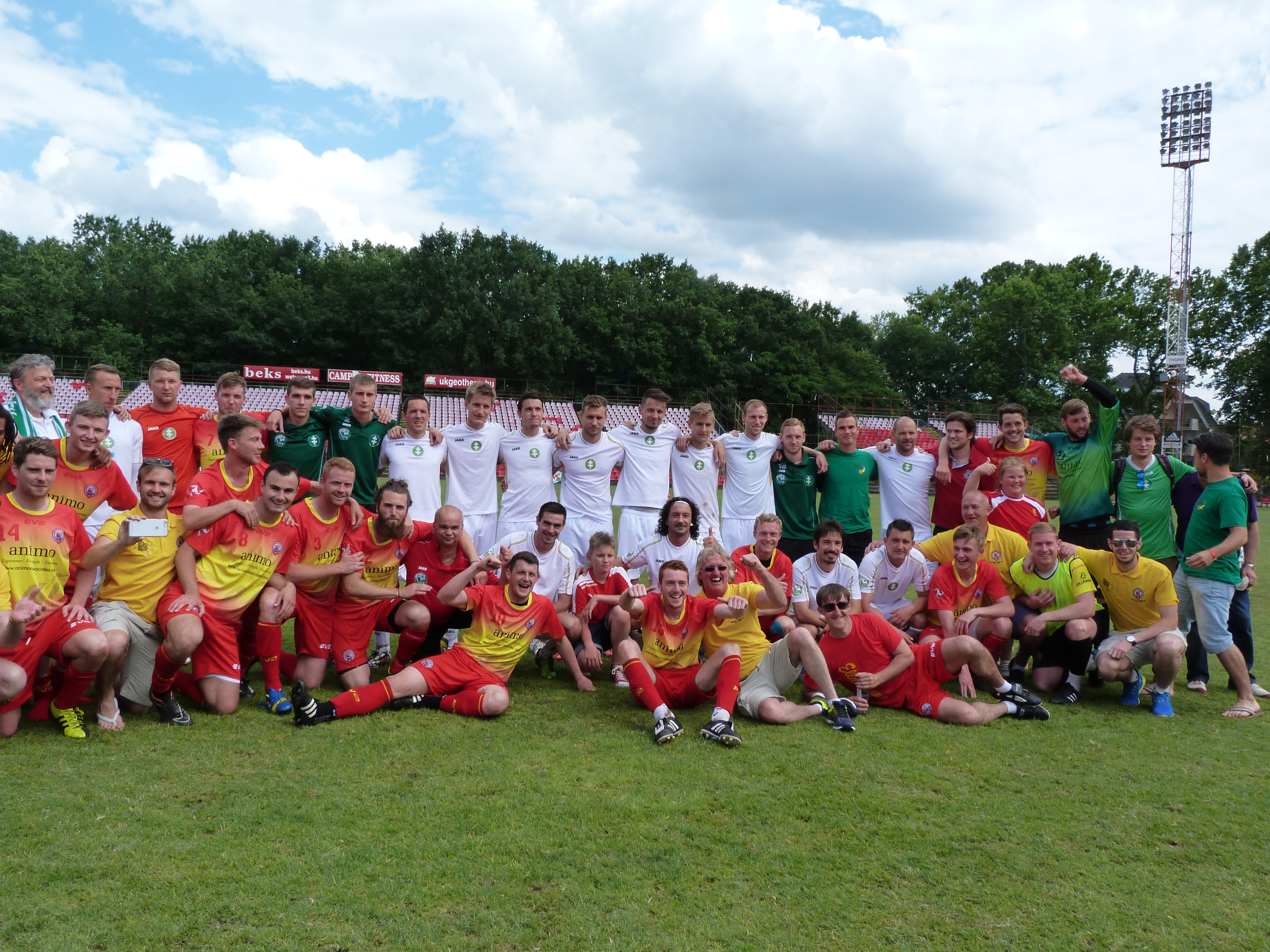
Ellan Vannin - Felvidék

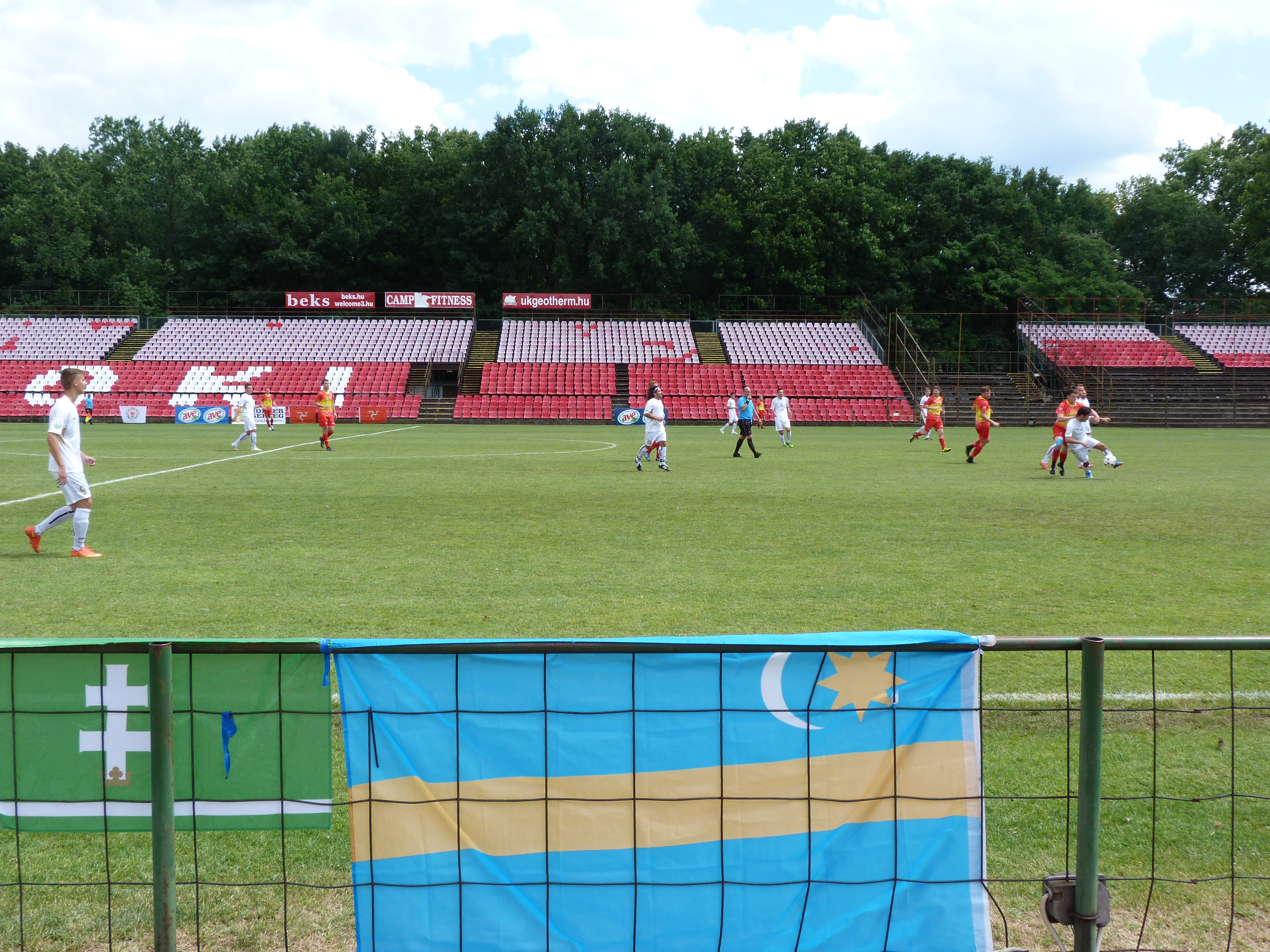
Ellan Vannin - Felvidék

However, in March 2015, at the draw for the tournament, CONIFA announced that it had taken the decision to move the tournament away from the Isle of Man, with the new hosts being announced as Székely Land. The reasoning for the move was that the logistical and financial issues of hosting what was becoming an increasingly large and potentially popular event, which then was increased from one venue to three, were too great for the Manx hosts to surmount, with the suggestion that Székely Land would be able to obtain the necessary support from the Hungarian government. As a consequence, the whole event was moved; initially intended to take place in the Hungarian capital, Budapest, it was finally placed in the country's second largest city, Debrecen.

Debrecen
Stadion Oláh Gábor Út	Gyulai István Atlétikai Stadion
47.549573°N 21.638882°E	47.552639°N 21.637194°E
Capacity: 10,200	Capacity: 3,000
Debrecen is located in Hungary

== Participants ==
The participants will be drawn into 4 groups of 3. The top 2 teams from each group advance to the quarter-finals. There will also be placement games. The following teams will participate in the tournament. The 12 teams have been seeded into three pots, according to CONIFA's rankings: Originally, the Sápmi football team, who had hosted the World Football Cup in 2014, were due to take part, but they were subsequently replaced by Monaco.

Pot 1	Pot 2	Pot 3
Occitania; Padania; County of Nice; Northern Cyprus	(Isle of Man) Ellan Vannin; Artsakh; Abkhazia; Székely Land	South Ossetia; Romani people; Franconia; Sápmi

Subsequently, 3 teams (Franconia, Monaco, Nagorno-Karabakh) cancelled their participation for the 2015 European Football Cup in Hungary, which forced the originally planned scheduled to be revised. The presence of a total of nine teams led to three groups of three being formed. In May 2015, Occitania also announced their withdrawal from the competition, which led to another revision of the match schedule into two groups of four, which CONIFA based upon their ranking points system. In June 2015, another three teams, South Ossetia, Abkhazia and Northern Cyprus, were all forced to withdraw, as a result of visa difficulties, while the Felvidek team was added to the line up - leaving two groups of three and six participants in total.

== Matches ==
=== Group stage ===
Key to colours in group tables
Teams that advanced to the semi-finals

==== Group A ====
Team	Pld	W	D	L	GF	GA	GD	Pts
County of Nice	2	2	0	0	7	3	+4	6
Felvidék	2	1	0	1	4	5	−1	3
Székely Land	2	0	0	2	3	6	−3	0

17 June 2015
19:30

Székely Land	2–3	County of Nice
Hodgyai; Magyari		Delerue; Tchokounte

18 June 2015
19:30

Felvidék	3–1	Székely Land
Dalkoni; Magyar; Kosa		Magyari

19 June 2015
18:00

Felvidék	1–4	County of Nice
Kosa		Onda; Delerue; Romen; Jaziri

==== Group B ====
Team	Pld	W	D	L	GF	GA	GD	Pts
Padania	2	2	0	0	4	2	+2	6
(Isle of Man) Ellan Vannin	2	1	0	1	3	2	+1	3
Romani people	2	0	0	2	3	6	−3	0

17 June 2015
16:00

Padania	3–2	Romani people
Tignonsini; Garavelli; Rota		Horvath; Csoka

18 June 2015
16:00

Romani people	1–3	(Isle of Man) Ellan Vannin
Irhas 29'	Report	Sharkey 11'; Jones 49'; Bass 55'

19 June 2015
15:00

Padania	1–0	(Isle of Man) Ellan Vannin
Prandelli

=== Knockout stage ===
==== Bracket ====
Semi-finals
20 June – Debrecen
County of Nice	3
(Isle of Man) Ellan Vannin	1
20 June – Debrecen
Padania	5
Felvidék	0

Final
21 June – Debrecen
County of Nice	1
Padania	4
Third place
21 June – Debrecen
(Isle of Man) Ellan Vannin	1 (5)
Felvidék	1 (3)

==== Placement matches ====
19 June 2015
12:00
5th/6th Place

Székely Land	2–4	Romani people
Silion; Mate		Oivido; Irhas; Horvath

==== Semi-finals ====
20 June 2015
15:00

County of Nice	3–1	(Isle of Man) Ellan Vannin
Delerue; Floridi; Girand		Jones

20 June 2015
18:00

Padania	5–0	Felvidék
Prandelli; Mazzotti; De Peralta; Baruwah

==== Third-Place play-off ====
21 June 2015
13:00

Ellan Vannin (Isle of Man)	1–1	Felvidék
Bass		Magyar
Penalties
	5–3

==== Final ====
21 June 2015
16:00

County of Nice	1–4	Padania
Delerue		Tignonsini; De Peralta; Prandelli
