= Arben Broci High School =

Location
- Tirana; Albania
- Coordinates: 41.32480°N 19.80867°E

Information
- Type: High school
- Established: 1948; 77 years ago

Arben Broci High School is a high school located in Tirana, Albania. Arben Broci High was opened in 1948. The school was named after Arben Broci, who was one of the four victims that was killed in the anti-communist Albanian protests.

The school was rebuilt as part of a government programme to upgrade high schools in Tirana. The reconstruction was completed in the summer of 2006. It was architecturally designed by Arkimade.
