= Luhansk People's Republic national football team =

Unofficial national football team

Luhansk People's Republic
- Association: Luhansk Football Union (Луганский футбольный союз)
- Confederation: ConIFA (previously)
- Head coach: Anatoliy Kuksov
- Home stadium: Avanhard Stadium (Luhansk)
First colours	Second colours

First international
- Abkhazia 1–0 Luhansk PR (Sukhumi; 29 May 2015)

Biggest win
- Luhansk PR 3–1 Donetsk PR (Luhansk; 19 September 2015)

Biggest defeat
- Donetsk PR 4–1 Luhansk PR (Donetsk; 14 May 2015)

CONIFA European Football Cup
- Appearances: 0

The Luhansk People's Republic football team (or Lugansk) was a team representing the Luhansk People's Republic (LPR), a disputed Russian republic in eastern Ukraine. (Note: The Luhansk People's Republic (LPR) was established by Russian-backed separatists in the Luhansk Oblast of eastern Ukraine in 2014, during the war in Donbas. The disputed entity was annexed by Russia in 2022, during the 2022 Russian invasion of Ukraine. Russia regards the LPR as a Russian republic, a claim that is unrecognised by Ukraine and by most of the international community.) The team was not affiliated with FIFA or UEFA and therefore could not compete for the FIFA World Cup or the UEFA European Championship. The LPR team had been a member of CONIFA, although it later withdrew.

== History ==
The Luhansk Football Union was founded on October 4, 2014. FC Zorya Luhansk alumnus Anatoliy Kuksov coached the team prior to his death in January 2022. The LPR team took part in the 2018 CONIFA World Football Cup qualification but failed to make it through to the finals. Sascha Düerkop, general secretary of CONIFA, stated that he did not agree with the LPR team politically — comparing them negatively with the Chagossians — but that "that was not the point" and they were allowed to compete. CONIFA were criticised for supporting "Russia-backed separatism." The LPR team was scheduled to take part in the 2019 CONIFA European Football Cup but later withdrew. After the Russian annexation of the LPR, the team ceased to exist.

== International results ==
29 May 2015 Friendly	Abkhazia	1–0	Luhansk People's Republic	Republican Stadium, Sukhumi

8 August 2015 Friendly	Donetsk People's Republic	4–1	Luhansk People's Republic	Metalurh Stadium, Donetsk

19 September 2015 Friendly	Luhansk People's Republic	3–1	Donetsk People's Republic	Avanhard Stadium, Luhansk

13 August 2016 Friendly	Donetsk People's Republic	1–1	Luhansk People's Republic	Metalurh Stadium, Yenakiieve

24 August 2019 Friendly	Luhansk People's Republic	4–3	South Ossetia	Avanhard Stadium, Luhansk

20 September 2019 Friendly	South Ossetia	2–0	Luhansk People's Republic	Guram Tskhovrebov Stadium, Tskhinvali

Win Draw Loss

== See also ==
- Donetsk People's Republic national football team
