= Jemal Gubaz =

Russian footballer (born 1968)

- Џьемал Гәбаз

6th chairman of the Football Federation of Abkhazia
- In office March 2012 – 21 September 2015
- Preceded by: Leonid Dzapshba
- Succeeded by: Ruslan Ajinjal

Personal details
- Born: 2 September 1968 (age 58) Gudauta, Georgian SSR
- Height: 1.76 m (5 ft 9 1/2 in)
- Occupation: Footballer (retired); Football administrator
Association football career
- Position: Midfielder
Youth career
- ROShISP-10 Rostov-on-Don
Senior career*
Years	Team	Apps	(Gls)
1985	FC Dinamo Sokhumi	12	(2)
1985	FC SKA Rostov-on-Don	0	(0)
1986	FC Torpedo Kutaisi	0	(0)
1986–1987	FC Dinamo Sokhumi	41	(6)
1987–1988	FC Dinamo Tbilisi	7	(1)
1988–1991	FC Dinamo Sokhumi	56	(5)
1992	FC SKA Rostov-on-Don	37	(15)
1993	FC Rostselmash Rostov-on-Don	20	(4)
1993	→ FC Rostselmash-2 Rostov-on-Don (loan)	5	(2)
1994	FC SKA Rostov-on-Don	17	(3)
1995	FC Anzhi Makhachkala	13	(1)
1996	FC SKA Rostov-on-Don	10	(0)
- * Club domestic league appearances and goals

Jemal Redzepovich Gubaz (Abkhaz: Џьемал Гәбаз, Russian: Джемал Реджепович Губаз; born 2 September 1968, in Gudauta) is a former football player from Abkhazia and a former chairman of the Football Federation of Abkhazia.

== Chairman of the Football Federation of Abkhazia ==
In March 2012, Jemal Gubaz was elected to succeed Leonid Dzapshba as Chairman of the Football Federation of Abkhazia.

On 8 September 2015, the FFA announced that the upcoming leadership election had been moved forward to October from the Spring of 2016, so as to leave more time for the preparation of the 2016 ConIFA World Football Cup, hosted by Abkhazia. Gubaz was initially running for re-election, but announced on 21 September his immediate resignation, leaving the field clear for Ruslan Ajinjal to be elected unanimously.

On 27 October, Gubaz explained in an interview that he had called the early election after President Raul Khajimba had expressed his support for his work, but that he stepped down when he heard that Khajimba in fact supported Ajinjal's candidacy, because he "didn't play such games".
