= Arben Puto =

Albanian historian

Arbbn Pluto
- Born: 6 April 1924
- Died: 2016 (aged 91–92)
- Occupation: Historian

Arben Puto (6 April 1924 – 2016) was an Albanian scholar and historian.

== Works ==
- Puto, Arben (1978). Pavarësia shqiptare dhe diplomacia e fuqive të mëdha, 1912-1914 (in Albanian). Tiranë: 8 Nëntori.
- Puto, Arben (1981). From the Annals of British Diplomacy. Tiranë: 8 Nëntori.
- Pollo, Stefanaq; Puto, Arben (1981). History of Albania from Its Origins to the Present Day. London: 8 Nëntori. ISBN 978-0-7100-0365-2.
- Puto, Arben (1984). Çështja shqiptare në aktët ndërkombëtare të periudhës së imperializmit (in Albanian). Tiranë: 8 Nëntori.
- Puto, Arben (1990). Demokracia e rrethuar: qeveria e Fan Nolit në marrëdhëniet e jashtme, qershor-dhjetor 1924 (in Albanian). Tiranë: 8 Nëntori.
- Puto, Arben (2003). Historia diplomatike e çështjes shqiptare, 1878—1926 (in Albanian). Tiranë: 8 Nëntori. ISBN 978-99927-51-42-8.
