= Beslan Gubliya =

Russian footballer

Beslan gubliya
Personal information
- Full name: Beslan Vladimirovich Gubliya
- Date of birth: 29 November 1976 (age 49)
- Place of birth: Cherkessk, Russian SFSR
- Height: 1.70 m (5 ft 7 in)
- Position: Midfielder

Senior career*
Years	Team	Apps	(Gls)
1994	FC Nart Cherkessk	11	(2)
1995	FC Iriston Mozdok	26	(2)
1996	FC Spartak Anapa	12	(0)
1996–1997	FC Nart Cherkessk	47	(11)
1998–2000	FC Druzhba Maykop	88	(19)
2001	FC Dynamo Stavropol	34	(10)
2002–2004	FC Terek Grozny	93	(4)
2005	FC Metallurg-Kuzbass Novokuznetsk	37	(1)
2006–2008	FC Mashuk-KMV Pyatigorsk	110	(2)
2009	FC Luch-Energiya Vladivostok	25	(1)

Managerial career
- 2020–: Abkhazia
- * Club domestic league appearances and goals

Beslan Vladimirovich Gubliya (Russian: Беслан Владимирович Гублия; born 29 November 1976) is a former Russian professional football player.

== Club career ==
He made his Russian Football National League debut for FC Druzhba Maykop on 8 April 1998 in a game against FC CSK VVS-Kristall Smolensk.

On 12 August 2004, he appeared in the 2004–05 UEFA Cup first qualification round for FC Terek Grozny in a game against Lech Poznań.

== Honours ==
- Russian Cup winner: 2004.
