= Arben Kasolli =

Albanian football manager and former player

Personal information
- Date of birth: 21 January 1967 (age 59)
- Place of birth: The Hague, Netherlands
- Position: Goalkeeper

Team information
- Current team: Chameria (manager)

Senior career*
Years	Team	Apps	(Gls)
- Naftëtari
- 17 Nëntori
- PAS Giannina
- Ajax
- HFC Haarlem
- AZ Alkmaar
- Fortuna Sittard
- NEC Nijmegen

Managerial career
- 2013–2014: Hajer (goalkeeping coach)
- 2014–2016: Al Faisaly (goalkeeping coach)
- 2019–: Chameria (manager)
- 2019–2021: Dordrecht (goalkeeping coach)
- * Club domestic league appearances and goals

Arben Kasolli (born 21 January 1967) is an Albanian football manager and former player who is the manager of Chameria national team.

== Early life ==
Kasolli started playing as a goalkeeper at an early age and was a ball boy.

== Education ==
Kasolli attended the Vojo Kushi Higher Institute of Physical Culture.

== Playing career ==
At the age of eighteen, Kasolli debuted for Naftëtari in the Kategoria Superiore, before playing in Greece.

== Managerial career ==
Kasolli obtained a managerial license from the Dutch Football Federation. He was once the only foreign goalkeeping coach in the Netherlands. Besides working as a goalkeeping coach, he also worked as a scout. He has established the Kasolli Goalkeeping Academy in Kosovo. In 2018, he was appointed manager of the Chameria national football team.

== Personal life ==
Kasolli has been married to a Dutch woman.
