= Marko Çema =

Albanian footballer

Personal information
- Full name: Marko van Basten Çema
- Date of birth: 16 January 1998 (age 28)
- Place of birth: Tirana, Albania
- Height: 1.96 m (6 ft 5 in)
- Position: Forward

Team information
- Current team: Korabi

Youth career
- 2011–2012: Olimpic
- 2012–2014: Tirana
- 2014: Partizani Tirana
- 2014–2015: Olimpic
- 2015–2017: Internacional Tirana

Senior career*
Years	Team	Apps	(Gls)
2015–2017	Internacional Tirana	12	(1)
2017–2019	Dinamo Tirana	47	(6)
2019–2020	Kukësi	8	(1)
2020–2021	Erzeni	8	(0)
2021	Partizani Tirana B	11	(1)
2021–2022	Burreli	26	(3)
2022–2023	Turbina	20	(0)
2023–	Korabi	24	(5)

International career^{‡}
2015–2016	Albania U19	5	(0)
2019	Chameria	3	(3)
- * Club domestic league appearances and goals as of 4 May 2024 ‡ National team caps and goals as of 4 June 2019

Marko van Basten Çema (born 16 January 1998), commonly known as Marko Çema is an Albanian professional footballer who plays as a forward for Albanian club Korabi and the Chameria national team.

== Club career ==
=== Kukësi ===
On 15 June 2019, Çema signed a two-year contract with Kategoria Superiore club Kukësi. On 1 October 2019, he made his debut in the 2019–20 Albanian Cup first round against Shkumbini after being named in the starting line-up and scored his side's hattrick during a 6–0 home win.

=== Erzeni ===
On 23 August 2020, Çema signed a one-year contract with Kategoria e Parë club Erzeni. On 4 November 2020, he made his debut in a 0–2 home defeat against former club Dinamo Tirana after being named in the starting line-up.

=== Partizani Tirana B ===
On 1 February 2021, Çema joined Kategoria e Parë side Partizani Tirana B. Nineteen days later, he made his debut in a 0–0 away draw against Besëlidhja Lezhë after coming on as a substitute at 83rd minute in place of Odeon Bërdufi.

== International career ==
Born in the Albania, Çema is of Cham Albanian descent, he represented Albania U19 at both the 2016 and 2017 editions of the UEFA European Under-19 Championship qualifications. In May 2019, Çema was named as part of the Chameria squad for 2019 CONIFA European Football Cup. On 3 June 2019, he made his debut with Chameria in 2019 CONIFA European Football Cup group stage match against Artsakh and scored his side's two goals during a 4–1 home win.

== Career statistics ==
=== Club ===
As of 20 March 2021

Appearances and goals by club, season and competition
Club	Season	League			Cup		Other		Total	
Club	Season	Division	Apps	Goals	Apps	Goals	Apps	Goals	Apps	Goals
Internacional Tirana	2014–15	Kategoria e Tretë	6	1	0	0	—		6	1
Internacional Tirana	2015–16	Kategoria e Dytë	2	0	0	0	—		2	0
Internacional Tirana	2016–17	Kategoria e Dytë	4	0	0	0	—		4	0
Internacional Tirana	Total		12	1	0	0	—		12	1
Dinamo Tirana	2017–18	Kategoria e Parë	22	1	2	0	—		24	1
Dinamo Tirana	2018–19	Kategoria e Parë	25	5	2	0	—		27	5
Dinamo Tirana	Total		47	6	4	0	—		51	6
Kukësi	2019–20	Kategoria Superiore	8	1	3	3	1 (Note: Appearance in Albanian Supercup)	0	12	4
Erzeni	2020–21	Kategoria e Parë	8	0	0	0	—		8	0
Partizani Tirana B	2020–21	Kategoria e Parë	6	1	0	0	—		6	1
Partizani Tirana B	Total		22	2	3	3	1	0	26	5
Career total			81	9	7	3	1	0	89	12
