= Avanhard Stadium (Luhansk) =

Multi-purpose stadium in Luhansk, Ukraine

Coordinates: 48°33′34″N 39°19′16″E

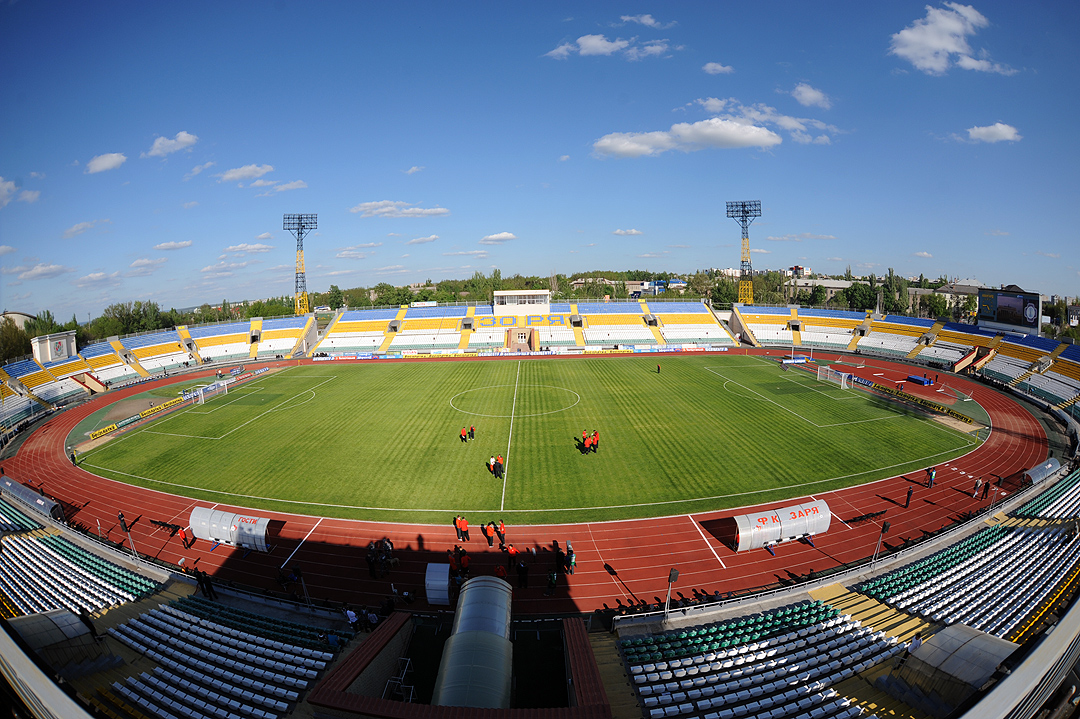
- Avanhard Stadium until war
- Interactive map of Avanhard Stadium
- Former names: Kliment Voroshilov Stadium
- Location: Luhansk, Ukraine
- Owner: Luhansk People's Republic national football team, Luhansk Peoples Republic.
- Capacity: 22,288 (football)
- Surface: Grass

Construction
- Opened: 1951
- Renovated: 2015

Tenants
- FC Zorya Luhansk (1951–2013); Luhansk People's Republic national football team (2015–present)

Avanhard Stadium is a multi-purpose stadium in Luhansk, Ukraine. The stadium has a capacity of 22,288 spectators.

== History ==
The stadium was built in 1951 as the Kliment Voroshilov Stadium. In 1957, the stadium's capacity was 7,447. It was not until 1961 that it was renamed into Avanhard (Avangard) Stadium. In 1967, the Avanhard Stadium could hold 40,000 spectators. In 1974, running tracks were installed. In 1986, due to modernization, the stadium's capacity was reduced to 32,243. In 2002, the stadium ownership changed when it was transferred from Luhanskteplovoz to the Luhansk Oblast Administration. In 2003, major renovations were conducted to the stadium's facilities, and as a result, its capacity was reduced to 22,288. In 2011, the turf was replaced, along with drainage and heat systems. This came after the Football Federation of Ukraine temporarily banned Zorya Luhansk from playing its Ukrainian Premier League matches at the stadium when it was found after a match with Volyn Lutsk that its turf was in extensive disrepair.

In late July 2014, the stadium was damaged by an LPR mortar attack during the war in Donbas. It has since been under the control of the Luhansk People's Republic.

The stadium was, like many stadia in Ukraine, badly damaged in the 2022 Russian Invasion of Ukraine. In 2025, the Russian-installed authorities announced they would begin work to restore the stadium and that, in the process, Avanhard would be entirely demolished to create a new stadium. After negotiations, it was confirmed that the entrance would be the only thing maintained from the existing stadium.
