= Arsen Kaytov =

Russian footballer

Personal information
- Full name: Arsen Aslanbekovich Kaytov
- Date of birth: 2 July 1989 (age 37)
- Place of birth: Ordzhonikidze, Russian SFSR
- Height: 1.77 m (5 ft 9 1/2 in)
- Position: Defender

Senior career*
Years	Team	Apps	(Gls)
2007	FC Saturn Ramenskoye	0	(0)
2008	FC Alania Vladikavkaz	0	(0)
2008	FC Avtodor Vladikavkaz	10	(0)
2009	FC KAMAZ Naberezhnye Chelny	0	(0)
2010–2011	FC FAYUR Beslan	49	(3)
2012–2014	FC Torpedo Armavir	52	(0)
2014–2015	FC Vityaz Krymsk	11	(0)
2015–2016	FC Alania Vladikavkaz	24	(1)
2016–2018	FC Armavir	7	(0)
2019–2020	FC Van	20	(1)
2020	Lernayin Artsakh Goris	0	(0)
2021–2022	FC Gvardeyets Skvortsovo		
2022	FC Metallurg Vidnoye	1	(0)
2022	FC Elektron Veliky Novgorod	14	(0)
- * Club domestic league appearances and goals

Arsen Aslanbekovich Kaytov (Russian: Арсен Асланбекович Кайтов; born 2 July 1989) is a Russian former professional football player.

== Club career ==
He made his professional debut for FC Saturn Ramenskoye on 27 June 2007 in the Russian Cup game against FC SKA-Energiya Khabarovsk.
