= Dmitry Akhba =

Russian footballer

Personal information
- Full name: Dmitry Zaurovich Akhba
- Date of birth: 6 September 1985 (age 41)
- Place of birth: Maykop, Russian SFSR
- Height: 1.85 m (6 ft 1 in)
- Position: Forward

Senior career*
Years	Team	Apps	(Gls)
2007	FC Volgar-Gazprom Astrakhan (amateur)		
2008	FC Volgar-Gazprom-2 Astrakhan	8	(0)
2008–2009	FC Ryazan	37	(12)
2010	FC Gubkin	28	(8)
2011–2012	FC Avangard Kursk	57	(18)
2013	FC Amur-2010 Blagoveshchensk	10	(5)
2013–2015	FC Volgar Astrakhan	39	(20)
2015	FC Baikal Irkutsk	19	(4)
2016	FC Khimki	23	(6)

International career
	Abkhazia	5	(1)
- * Club domestic league appearances and goals

Dmitry Zaurovich Akhba (Russian: Дмитрий Заурович Ахба; born 6 September 1985) is a former Russian professional association football player. He has also appeared for the Abkhazia national football team, recently competing in the 2014 ConIFA World Football Cup.

== Club career ==
He played 3 seasons in the Russian Football National League for FC Volgar Astrakhan, FC Baikal Irkutsk and FC Khimki.
