= Xhorxhian Boçi =

Albanian footballer

Personal information
- Date of birth: 14 February 1994 (age 32)
- Place of birth: Delvinë, Albania
- Position: Defender

Team information
- Current team: Butrinti

Youth career
- Delvina

Senior career*
Years	Team	Apps	(Gls)
2011–2014	Delvina		
2014–2015	Adriatiku	1	(0)
2015–2016	Kamza	34	(3)
2017–2019	Iliria	57	(3)
2019–2021	Dinamo Tirana	44	(4)
2021–2022	Erzeni	17	(0)
2024–	Butrinti		
- * Club domestic league appearances and goals as of 17 May 2022

Xhorxhian Boçi (born 14 February 1994) is an Albanian footballer who plays as a defender for Butrinti. Boçi was captain of Dinamo Tirana when playing there.
