= FC Lada Dimitrovgrad (2017) =

Russian football club

- Full name: Football Club Lada Dimitrovgrad
- Founded: 2018
- Dissolved: 2021
- Chairman: Yuri Mylnikov
- 2020–21: Russian Professional Football League, Group 4, 11th
- Website: https://lada-dd.ru/

FC Lada Dimitrovgrad (Russian: ФК «Лада» Димитровград) is a Russian football club from Dimitrovgrad, founded in 2017.

== History ==
A different team under the same name (or variations thereof) existed in the 1990s and 2000s, eventually it moved and ended its existence under the name FC Akademiya Tolyatti. The new team was founded in 2017 and entered the third-tier Russian Professional Football League for the 2019–20 season (in 2017 club was named as FC Torpedo Dimitrovgrad and played in Russian Amateur Football League). The club failed to receive PFL license for the 2021–22 season.

Formerly, in 2013–16 seasons, in Russian Amateur Football League the city was represented by another football club – FC Dimitrovgrad, and in 1993–98 seasons – FC Himmash.
