= Jurgen Vogli =

Albanian footballer

Personal information
- Full name: Jurgen Vogli
- Date of birth: 12 June 1993 (age 33)
- Place of birth: Peqin, Albania
- Position: Defender

Team information
- Current team: Egnatia
- Number: 5

Youth career
- 2008–2011: Shkumbini Peqin

Senior career*
Years	Team	Apps	(Gls)
2011–2016	Shkumbini	71	(2)
2014	→ Elbasani (loan)	15	(0)
2015	→ Lushnja (loan)	8	(0)
2017–2018	Egnatia	21	(0)
2018	Teuta	0	(0)
2019–	Egnatia	16	(0)

International career
2013	Albania U-21	1	(0)
- * Club domestic league appearances and goals as of 23 November 2019

Jurgen Vogli (born 12 June 1993) is an Albanian footballer who plays for FK Egnatia in the Albanian First Division.
