= Donetsk People's Republic national football team =

Unofficial national football team

Donetsk People's Republic
- Association: Football Union of the Donetsk People's Republic (Футбольный союз Донецкой Народной Республики)
- Confederation: CONIFA (previously)
- Head coach: Arsen Isakov
- Home stadium: Metalurh Stadium (Donetsk)
First colours	Second colours

First international
- Abkhazia 1–0 Donetsk PR (Sukhumi; 14 May 2015)

Biggest win
- Donetsk PR 4–1 Luhansk PR (Donetsk; 8 August 2015)

Biggest defeat
- Luhansk PR 3–1 Donetsk PR (Luhansk; 19 September 2015)

CONIFA European Football Cup
- Appearances: 0

The Donetsk People's Republic football team was a team representing the Donetsk People's Republic (DPR), a disputed Russian republic in eastern Ukraine. (Note: The Donetsk People's Republic (DPR) was established by Russian-backed separatists in the Donetsk Oblast of eastern Ukraine in 2014, during the war in Donbas. The disputed entity was annexed by Russia in 2022, during the 2022 Russian invasion of Ukraine. Russia regards the DPR as a Russian republic, a claim that is unrecognised by Ukraine and by most of the international community.) The team was not affiliated with FIFA or UEFA and therefore cannot compete for the FIFA World Cup or the UEFA European Championship. Occasionally, the DPR team has been a member of CONIFA, although it currently was not as of November 2022.

== History ==
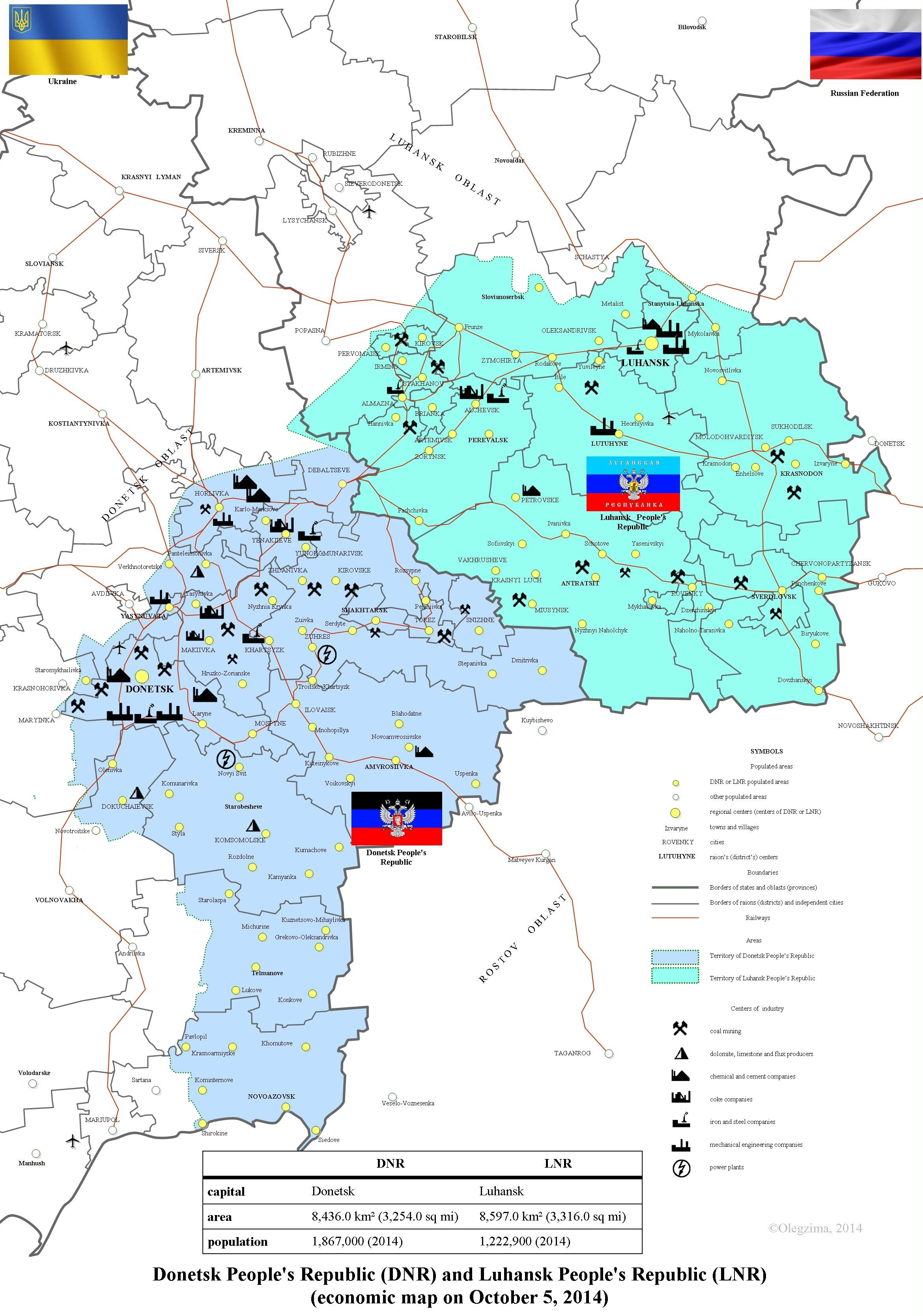
Territories in Ukraine occupied by the Donetsk People's Republic and Luhansk People's Republic from 2015 until the 2022 Russian invasion of Ukraine.

The team was founded on 25 July 2015, playing Abkhazia in their first game. The DPR team took part in the 2018 CONIFA World Football Cup qualification but failed to make it through to the finals. Sascha Düerkop, general secretary of CONIFA, stated that he did not agree with the DPR team politically — comparing them negatively with the Chagossians — but that "that was not the point" and they were allowed to compete. CONIFA were criticized for supporting "Russia-backed separatism." The DPR team was scheduled to take part in the 2019 CONIFA European Football Cup but later withdrew.

== Fixtures and results ==
Win Draw Loss

14 May 2015 Friendly	Abkhazia	1–0	Donetsk PR	Sukhumi, Abkhazia

8 August 2015 Friendly	Donetsk PR	4–1	Luhansk PR	Donetsk, Donetsk People's Republic

19 Sept. 2015 Friendly	Luhansk PR	3–1	Donetsk PR	Luhansk, Luhansk People's Republic

21 May 2016 Friendly	Abkhazia	0–0	Donetsk PR	Sukhumi, Abkhazia

13 August 2016 Friendly	Donetsk PR	1–1	Luhansk PR	Donetsk, Donetsk People's Republic

31 August 2017 Friendly	Donetsk PR	4–3	(Donetsk People's Republic) Donetsk PR U-21	Makiivka, Donetsk People's Republic

28 May 2017 Friendly	Abkhazia	1–2	Donetsk PR	Sukhumi, Abkhazia

13 February 2020 Friendly	Kyzyltash Bakhchisaray (Autonomous Republic of Crimea)	1–0	Donetsk PR	Bakhchisaray, Crimea

== See also ==
- Luhansk People's Republic national football team
- Football Association of Donetsk Oblast
