= Flavio Prendi =

Albanian footballer (born 1995)

Personal information
- Date of birth: 12 October 1995 (age 31)
- Place of birth: Pukë, Albania
- Position: Defender

Youth career
- 2011–2014: Shkëndija Tiranë

Senior career*
Years	Team	Apps	(Gls)
2015	Kastrioti	2	(0)
2015–2019	Tërbuni	40	(3)
2016	→ Turbina (loan)	1	(0)
2019–2020	Dinamo Tirana	2	(0)

International career
- Chameria
- * Club domestic league appearances and goals

Flavio Prendi (born 12 October 1995) is an Albanian former professional footballer.
