= Alan Khugayev (footballer) =

Russian footballer (born 1991)

Personal information
- Full name: Alan Robertovich Khugayev
- Date of birth: 31 August 1991 (age 35)
- Place of birth: Vladikavkaz, Russia
- Height: 1.80 m (5 ft 11 in)
- Position: Midfielder

Team information
- Current team: FC Alania Vladikavkaz
- Number: 8

Senior career*
Years	Team	Apps	(Gls)
2011	FC Stroitel Russkoye		
2012	FC Stavropol (amateur)		
2012–2014	FC Gazprom transgaz Stavropol Ryzdvyany	44	(10)
2014	FC Volga Tver	13	(1)
2015–2016	FC Elektroavtomatika Stavropol		
2016–2017	FC Dynamo Stavropol	27	(1)
2017–2018	FC Mashuk-KMV Pyatigorsk	16	(1)
2018–2019	FC Spartak Vladikavkaz	24	(2)
2019–2023	FC Alania Vladikavkaz	90	(6)
2023	FC Ufa	9	(0)
2023	FC Chayka Peschanokopskoye	9	(0)
2023–	FC Alania Vladikavkaz	72	(6)

International career
2018–	Abkhazia	5	(2)
- * Club domestic league appearances and goals as of 15 November 2026

Alan Robertovich Khugayev (Russian: Алан Робертович Хугаев; born 31 August 1991) is a Russian football player who plays for FC Alania Vladikavkaz.

== Club career ==
He made his debut in the Russian Football National League for FC Alania Vladikavkaz on 1 August 2020 in a game against FC SKA-Khabarovsk, as a starter.

== International career ==
He represented Abkhazia national football team in several CONIFA competitions.
