= Dmitri Maskayev =

Russian footballer

Personal information
- Full name: Dmitri Aleksandrovich Maskayev
- Date of birth: 27 December 1987 (age 38)
- Place of birth: Kuybyshev, Russian SFSR
- Height: 1.85 m (6 ft 1 in)
- Positions: Midfielder; forward

Youth career
- FC Krylia Sovetov Samara

Senior career*
Years	Team	Apps	(Gls)
2005–2007	FC Krylia Sovetov Samara	0	(0)
2008	FC Tyumen	15	(0)
2009	FC Torpedo Moscow (amateur)		
2010–2011	FC Torpedo Moscow	29	(5)
2011–2012	FC Gubkin	24	(5)
2012	FC Luch-Energiya Vladivostok	6	(0)
2012–2013	FC Gubkin	21	(1)
2013	FC Lada-Togliatti	18	(3)
2014–2015	FC KAMAZ Naberezhnye Chelny	34	(6)
2015–2016	FC Syzran-2003	14	(1)
2016	FC Lada-Togliatti	13	(1)
2017	FC Rubin Yalta		
2017	FC Yevpatoriya (Crimean Premier League)		
2018	FC Lada Dimitrovgrad (amateur)		
2018	FC Lada-Togliatti	9	(2)
2019	FC Lada Dimitrovgrad (amateur)		
2019	FC Kaluga	16	(4)
2020	FC Lada Dimitrovgrad	12	(1)

International career
2018	Abkhazia	3	(2)
- * Club domestic league appearances and goals

Dmitri Aleksandrovich Maskayev (Russian: Дмитрий Александрович Маскаев; born 27 December 1987) is a Russian former professional football player. He now represents Abkhazia in International Football.

== Club career ==
He made his Russian Football National League debut for FC Torpedo Moscow on 17 May 2011 in a game against FC Khimki.
