= Edmond Hoxha =

Albanian footballer

Personal information
- Date of birth: 16 May 1997 (age 29)
- Place of birth: Kavajë, Albania
- Position: Forward

Team information
- Current team: Kastrioti
- Number: 24

Senior career*
Years	Team	Apps	(Gls)
2014–2018	Besa Kavajë	61	(3)
2018–2021	Besëlidhja Lezhë	61	(24)
2021–2023	Besa Kavajë	49	(14)
2023–	Kastrioti	22	(1)
- * Club domestic league appearances and goals as of 28 April 2024

Edmond Hoxha (born 16 May 1997) is an Albanian football player who plays as a forward for Kastrioti.
