= Abkhazia national football team =

Unaffiliated team representing Abkhazia

Abkhazia
- Association: Football Federation of Abkhazia
- Confederation: ConIFA
- Head coach: Beslan Gubliya
- Top scorer: Ruslan Shoniya (8)
- Home stadium: Republican Stadium, Sukhumi
- FIFA code: ABK
First colours	Second colours

First international
- Abkhazia 1–1 Nagorno-Karabakh (Sukhumi, Abkhazia; 25 September 2012)

Biggest win
- Abkhazia 9–0 Chagos Islands (Sukhumi, Abkhazia; 29 May 2016)

Biggest defeat
- Nagorno-Karabakh 3–0 Abkhazia (Stepanakert, Nagorno-Karabakh; 21 October 2012)

CONIFA World Football Cup
- Appearances: 3 (first in 2014)
- Best result: Champions, 2016

CONIFA European Football Cup
- Appearances: 2 (first in 2015)
- Best result: 3rd place, 2019

The Abkhazia national football team is the team representing the partially recognised state of Abkhazia. They are not affiliated with FIFA or UEFA, and therefore cannot compete for the FIFA World Cup or the UEFA European Championship.

They competed at the first ConIFA World Football Cup in 2014, finishing 8th overall, and they hosted and won the second edition in 2016.

== History ==
On the eastern coast of Black Sea where the Caucasus mountains meet is Abkhazia. It is sandwiched between Russia and Georgia. It is currently an independent state which declared sovereignty in 1990 and is only recognized by Russia, Nicaragua, Venezuela, and some other unrecognized nations. They were first registered in 2008 by Russia. However, Georgia still declares that Abkhazia is part of Georgia.

== Football ==
Football is a major sport in Abkhazia and FC Dinamo Sukhumi, a former Soviet second division league team is in the forefront. All Abkhaz football teams closed shop after the collapse of the Soviet Union in 1991. The first Abkhazian Premier League was founded in 1994 with 15 teams and Dynamo Sukhumi won the inaugural title. Another club, Nart Sukhumi, started in 1997, is dominating in the recent times in the domestic circuit with 12 league titles and 9 domestic cups. Former Russian lower league player Juma Kvaratskhelia was heading the Football Federation of Abkhazia in 2012. Later, Ruslan Adzhindzhal, who was the president, resigned in January 2017 and Kvaratskhelia was re elected in 2017. He also served as chief coach from 2012 to 2017.

After a revival in 2012, Abkhazia competed internationally under the umbrella of the CONIFA. The team made their debut in the CONIFA World Cup in 2014 and won the edition that they hosted in 2016. In 2018, they won a match against Tibet 3-0 in the World CONIFA Championship at London. But later, the defending champions went out at the first stage. They drew 2-2 with Northern Cyprus in their final group game and made an exit after the group stage itself.

In 2019, Abkhazia made their first appearance ever in the CONIFA European Cup, where they finished third.

In 2023, Abkhazia was drawn in the 2024 CONIFA World Cup Qualification Group D with Artsakh. The match was originally to be played on the 10 July. However, the match was cancelled.

== International record ==
=== At CONIFA World Football Cup ===
Year	Position	GP	W	D	L	GF	GA
(Sápmi) 2014	8th	5	1	3	1	6	6
(Abkhazia) 2016	1st	5	4	1	0	15	1
(Ogaden) 2018	9th	6	4	1	1	15	4
(Kurdistan Region) 2024	cancelled						
Total		16	9	5	2	36	11

=== At CONIFA European Football Cup ===
Year	Position	GP	W	D	L	GF	GA
(Székely Land) 2015	did not enter						
(Northern Cyprus) 2017	4th	5	1	3	1	5	6
(Republic of Artsakh) 2019	3rd	5	2	3	0	6	3
(County of Nice) 2021	Cancelled						
(Northern Cyprus) 2023	Cancelled						
Total		10	3	6	1	11	9

== Current squad ==
The following 23 players were called up to the squad for the 2019 CONIFA European Football Cup.

No.	Pos.	Player	Date of birth (age)	Caps	Goals	Club
1	GK	Ilia Sherba	25 August 1987 (age 39)	0	0	(Georgian Football Federation) Gagra
2	DF	Georgi Zhanaa	28 January 1995 (age 31)	15	0	(Football Federation of Abkhazia) Nart Sukhum
3	DF	Astamur Tsishba	23 February 1988 (age 38)	13	1	(Georgian Football Federation) Gagra
4	MF	Danil Chirikba	12 May 1998 (age 28)	0	0	(Football Federation of Abkhazia) New Athos
5	MF	Tarash Khagba	14 January 1991 (age 35)	18	3	(Football Federation of Abkhazia) Dinamo Sukhum
6	MF	Akaki Zvanba	28 October 1992 (age 34)	1	0	(Football Federation of Abkhazia) New Athos
7	MF	Alan Khugaev	31 August 1991 (age 35)	13	0	(Russian Football Union) Spartak Vladikavkaz
8	MF	Shabat Logua	22 March 1995 (age 31)	18	3	(Football Association of Serbia) OFK Bačka
9	DF	Lev Tarba	2 December 1999 (age 26)	0	0	(Football Federation of Abkhazia) Nart Sukhum
10	FW	Dmitri Maskayev	27 December 1987 (age 38)	4	1	(Russian Football Union) Torpedo Moscow
11	FW	Ramin Bartsits	26 January 1990 (age 36)	0	0	(Georgian Football Federation) Gagra
12	GK	Inal Katsuba	21 September 1995 (age 31)	8	0	(Football Federation of Abkhazia) Nart Sukhum
13	MF	Roman Zikrach	18 January 1998 (age 28)	0	0	(Kazakhstan Football Federation) FC Kairat
14	MF	Viktor Pimpiia	15 December 1998 (age 27)	4	1	(Football Federation of Abkhazia) Ritsa
15	FW	Danilo Ardzinba	27 May 1999 (age 27)	0	0	(Russian Football Union) FC Strogino Moscow
16	MF	Daur Chanba	7 July 2000 (age 26)	0	0	(Football Association of Serbia) OFK Bačka
17	DF	Lev Baburin	11 July 1997 (age 29)	0	0	(Russian Football Union) Baltica-M
18	MF	Giga Benidze	18 September 1998 (age 28)	0	0	(Football Federation of Abkhazia) Dinamo Sukhum
19	MF	Gudisa Smyr	6 March 2000 (age 26)	0	0	(Russian Football Union) FC Druzhba Maykop
20	MF	Timur Agrba	1 December 1999 (age 26)	0	0	(Football Federation of Abkhazia) Nart Sukhum

== Top goalscorers ==
Only matches at CONIFA tournaments are counted.

#	Player	Goals
1	Ruslan Shoniya	8
2	Dmitri Kortava	6
3	Shabat Logua	5
4	Ruslan Akhveldiani	4
5	Vladimir Argun	3
5	Dmitri Maskayev	3
5	Astamur Tarba	3
5	Amal Vardania	3

== Managers ==
Manager	Period	Played	Won	Drawn	Lost	Win %
(Abkhazia) Jemal Gubaz	2007–2008	2	0	2	0	0.0
(Abkhazia) Juma Kvaratskhelia	2012–2017	28	12	12	4	42.9
(Abkhazia) Beslan Ajinjal	2017–2019	12	7	4	1	58.3
(Abkhazia) Beslan Gubliya	2020–	4	1	2	1	25.0
Totals		46	20	20	6	43.47

== Honours ==
=== Non-FIFA competitions ===
- CONIFA World Football Cup
  - Champions (1): 2016
- CONIFA European Football Cup
  - Third place (1): 2019

== See also ==
- Abkhazia national football team results (2012–2019)
- Abkhazia national football team results (2020–present)
- Abkhazia national football team results (unofficial matches)
