= Brotherly derby =

Albania-Kosovo football derby

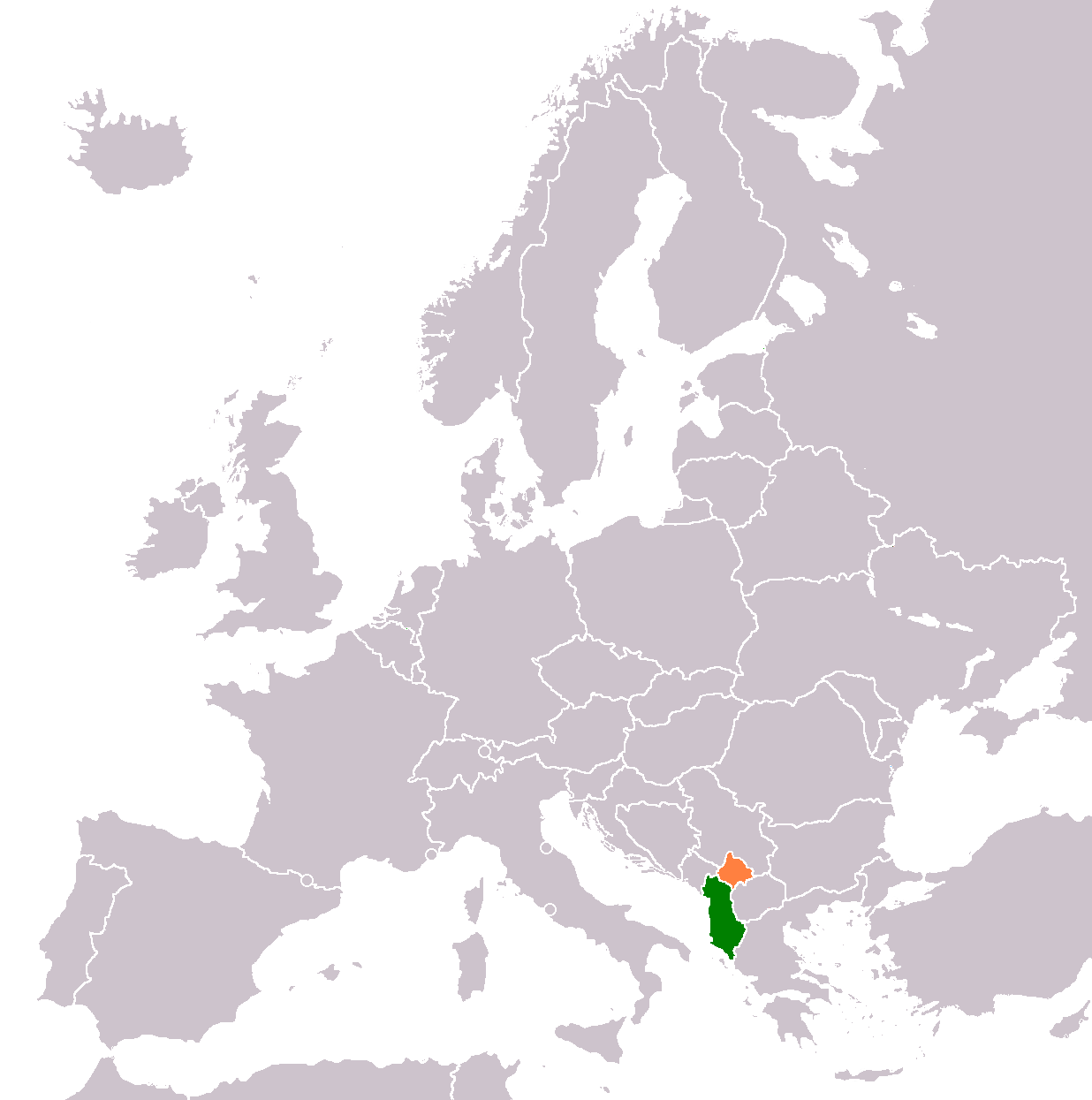
- Location of Albania (green) and Kosovo (orange)
- Native name: Derbi vëllazëror
- Other names: Brotherly (Albanian: Vëllazërorja)
- Sport: Football
- Location: Europe (UEFA)
- Teams: Albania; Kosovo
- First meeting: Unofficial: Tirana (Note: The alternative name of the Albania national team that was used during this match.) 2–0 Kosovo (Tirana, 29 November 1942); Official: Albania 3–1 Kosovo (Tirana; 14 February 1993)
- Latest meeting: Albania 2–1 Kosovo (Elbasan, 11 November 2020)
- Broadcasters: List of broadcasters; List of broadcasters
- Stadiums: Air Albania Stadium (Albania); Fadil Vokrri Stadium (Kosovo)

Statistics
- Total meetings: Competitive matches: 0 Exhibition matches: 7 Total matches: 7
- Most wins: Competitive matches: 0 Exhibition matches: Albania (5); Total matches: Albania (5)
- Most player appearances: 10 players (3)
- Top scorer: Arbër Zeneli; Bekim Balaj (2)
- All-time series: Albania: 5; Draw: 1; Kosovo: 1
- Largest victory: Kosovo 3–0 Albania (Zürich, 28 May 2018)
- Smallest victory: Kosovo 0–1 Albania (Pristina, 7 September 2002)
- Largest goal scoring: Kosovo 2–3 Albania (Pristina, 17 February 2010)

Brotherly derby (Albanian: Derbi vëllazëror), also known as the Brotherly (Albanian: Vëllazërorja) is the name given in football to any match between the men's national senior football teams of Albania and Kosovo.

== History ==
=== First match ===
The first match between these two teams took place on 29 November 1942. It was a friendly match as part of the celebrations for the thirtieth anniversary of the independence of Albania. The match ended with a 2–0 win for Tirana, and the starting line-ups of that match was:

Albania
- Halit Laçej (GK)
- Ramazan Hima
- Dik Qiriqi
- Bajram Kurani
- Muc Koxhja
- Xhavit Demneri
- Hasan Balla
- Akil Derani
- Zyber Lisi
- Tas Bylyku
- Ali Visha

Kosovo
- Mustafa Daci (GK)
- Ballanca
- Ahmet Zaimi
- Mazllum Xërxa
- Veseli
- Hajdar Hamza
- Nebil Dylatahu
- Ramadan Vraniqi
- Dobrica Barbaroga (Note: Dobrica Barbaroga was the Albanianized full name of Dobrica Barbarogić by the media of that time, which seems to be expression of peaceful coexistence with national minorities even in Kosovo at that time.)
- Bajrami
- Henci

=== Second match ===
50 years after the first match, the newly separated Football Federation of Kosovo from Football Association of Yugoslavia signed a cooperation protocol with the Albanian Football Association and in the framework of this protocol it was decided to play on 14 February a friendly match between these two national teams, and this match ended with a 3–1 win for Albania. The starting line-ups of that match was:

Albania
- Xhevahir Kapllani (GK)
- Adnan Oçelli
- Ardian Abazi
- Edmond Dalipi
- Edmond Dosti
- Eduard Abazi (c)
- Ilir Shulku
- Indrit Fortuzi
- Kastriot Peqini
- Salvador Kaçaj
- Shkëlqim Muça

Kosovo
- Ahmet Beselica (GK)
- Ardian Kozniku
- Bardhec Seferi
- Fadil Berisha
- Gani Llapashtica
- Genc Hoxha (c)
- Isa Sadriu
- Kushtrim Munishi
- Muharrem Sahiti
- Sadullah Ajeti
- Selajdin Jerliu

=== 2002–2015 ===
During the period 2002–2015, these national teams played a total of three friendly matches (two wins for Albania and a draw), the first match during this period took place on 7 September 2002 and this match ended with a 0–1 win for Albania. Eight years later, respectively on the second anniversary of Kosovo's independence, a match was played again between these two national teams and this match ended with a 2–3 win for Albania. The profits gathered from the match went to those affected by floods in Shkodër.

These national teams played a friendly match on 13 November 2015. Albania played this friendly after almost a month after beating Armenia in UEFA Euro 2016 qualifying which provided Albania with qualification for the first time to a major competition, UEFA Euro 2016. For Kosovo this match was among the few matches allowed by FIFA which would then be the last match before Kosovo's membership in UEFA, and FIFA. This match ended with a 2–2 draw, which was called a brotherly draw, where after this match officially all matches between the two national teams began to be called brotherly.

=== First official match ===
On 29 May 2018 the first official match was played between the two countries. This match took place on a neutral ground, in Letzigrund of Zürich. 18,700 fans mainly from the Albanian diaspora watched a 3–0 win for Kosovo, which was their first victory in history against Albania.

=== 'Unnecessary friendly' ===
On 28 October 2020, the Football Federation of Kosovo confirmed that a friendly match against Albania on 11 November would be played before the last two UEFA Nations League matches as a substitute for Albania's canceled match against Gibraltar. However, this match was criticized as an "unnecessary friendly" by both managers Edoardo Reja and Bernard Challandes, as the match would be taking place at a crucial moment for both teams, with Albania needing to be prepared for their next two Nations League matches in order to secure the promotion from League B, while Kosovo was faced with a player shortage due to the COVID-19 pandemic and a poor Nations League performance which threatened to relegate the team from League D. Regardless, the friendly went ahead and ended with a 2–1 win for Albania.

== Overall and matches ==
=== Overall ===
Competition	Round	Matches	Wins		Draws	Goals	
Competition	Round	Matches	Albania	Kosovo	Draws	Albania	Kosovo
FIFA World Cup	competition	0	0	0	0	0	0
FIFA World Cup	qualification process	0	0	0	0	0	0
UEFA European Championship	competition	0	0	0	0	0	0
UEFA European Championship	qualification process	0	0	0	0	0	0
Friendly		7	5	1	1	13	9
Total		7	5	1	1	13	9

=== Matches ===
29 November 1942 Friendly	Tirana	2–0	Kosovo	Tirana, Albanian Kingdom
14:30	Visha 5'; Lisi 89'	Report		Stadium: Shallvare; Attendance: 8,000; Referee: Abdurrahman Toptani (Albania)

14 February 1993 Friendly	Albania	3–1	Kosovo	Tirana, Albania
	Abazi 38'; Seferi 39' (o.g.); Fortuzi 42'	Report	Munishi 72'	Stadium: Selman Stërmasi Stadium; Attendance: 14,000; Referee: Bujar Pregja (Albania)

7 September 2002 Friendly	Kosovo	0–1	Albania	Pristina, Kosovo
		Report; Report (RSSSF)	Abazi 45' (o.g.)	Stadium: Pristina City Stadium; Attendance: 25,000; Referee: Bekim Pakuja (Macedonia)

17 February 2010 Friendly	Kosovo	2–3	Albania	Pristina, Kosovo
	Hasani 31'; Gashi 75'	Report (1st); Report (2nd)	Bicaj 4'; Muzaka 31' (pen.); Balaj 90+2'	Stadium: Pristina City Stadium; Attendance: 10,000

13 November 2015 Friendly	Kosovo	2–2	Albania	Pristina, Kosovo
14:00 (UTC+1)	Celina 58' (pen.); Rashani 69'	Report	Manaj 54'; Rrahmani 73'	Stadium: Pristina City Stadium; Attendance: 38,000 (record); Referee: Lorenc Jemini (Albania)

29 May 2018 Friendly	Kosovo	3–0	Albania	Zürich, Switzerland
20:00 (UTC+1)	Zeneli 20', 51'; Zhegrova 67'	Report		Stadium: Letzigrund; Attendance: 18,700; Referee: Alain Bieri (Switzerland)

11 November 2020 Friendly	Albania	2–1	Kosovo	Elbasan, Albania
16:00 (CET; UTC+01:00)	Balaj 31'; Uzuni 65'	Report; Report (UEFA)	Muriqi 85' (pen.)	Stadium: Elbasan Arena; Attendance: 0 Referee: Hüseyin Göçek (Turkey)

19 November 2022 Friendly	Albania	Canceled (Note: The match was canceled due to lack of logistics as no suitable stadium was found to play the match.)	Kosovo	Germany or Switzerland

== Records ==
As of 11 November 2020

Below are two lists of the top 11 players with the most appearances and goals in Brotherly derby.
Players in bold are still active at international level.

=== Most appearances ===
#	Pos.	Team(s)	Name	Caps	Goals
1	FW	Albania	**Bekim Balaj**	3	2
1	DF		**Amir Rrahmani**	3	1
1	FW	Albania	**Rey Manaj**	3	1
1	MF	Albania	**Odise Roshi**	3	0
1	FW	Albania	**Sokol Cikalleshi**	3	0
1	MF	Kosovo	**Bernard Berisha**	3	0
1	DF	Albania	**Elseid Hysaj**	3	0
1	GK	Albania	**Etrit Berisha**	3	0
1	DF	Albania	**Frédéric Veseli**	3	0
1	MF		**Herolind Shala**	3	0
2	MF	Kosovo	Anel Rashkaj	2	0

=== Top goalscorers ===
#	Pos.	Team(s)	Name	Goals	Caps	Avg.
1	MF	Kosovo	**Arbër Zeneli**	2	1	2
1	FW	Albania	**Bekim Balaj**	2	3	0.67
2	DF		**Amir Rrahmani**	1	3	0.33
2	FW	Albania	**Rey Manaj**	1	3	0.33
2	FW	Kosovo	Shpëtim Hasani	1	2	0.5
2	MF	Kosovo	**Bersant Celina**	1	2	0.5
2	FW	Kosovo	**Elbasan Rashani**	1	2	0.5
2	MF	Kosovo	**Edon Zhegrova**	1	2	0.5
2	FW	Kosovo	**Vedat Muriqi**	1	2	0.5
2	UNK	Albania	Ali Visha	1	1	1
2	FW	Albania	Zyber Lisi	1	1	1

== Players who played for both senior national teams ==
During the period before 2016, these two national teams have exchanged players with each other, which influenced these two teams to be called reserve (B) teams of each other, Kosovo national team was called Albania B due to many players coming to play for Kosovo as they had no space to play for Albania, while Albania national team was called Kosovo B due to of the large number of players of Kosovo Albanian descent in its composition. These exchanges began to be called acts of treason after Kosovo's membership in UEFA and FIFA, where some Albania players of Kosovo Albanian descent such as Amir Rrahmani, Herolind Shala and Milot Rashica who were part of the plans for the future of the Albania, moved to Kosovo.

- Players in **bold** are still active at international level with respective national teams.
- Career years when the players were gathered but did not debut with respective national teams.

=== Albania then Kosovo ===
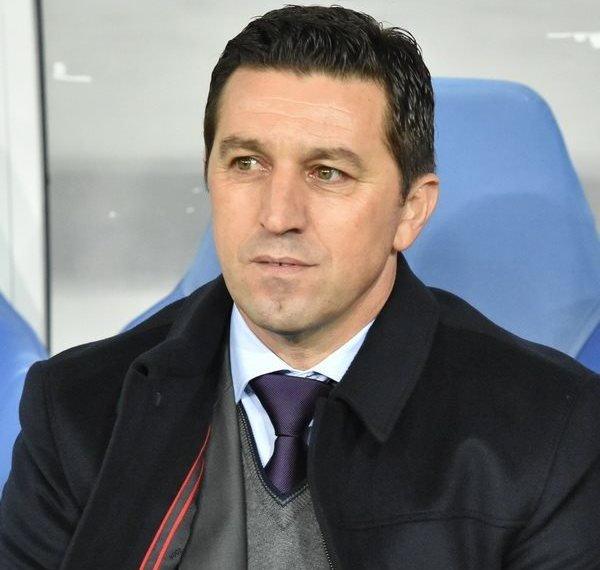
Besnik Hasi is the first player to switch from Albania to Kosovo

Player	Date of switch	Albania career	Kosovo career
Besnik Hasi	June 2007	2000–2007	2007
Ilir Berisha	2 March 2014	2013	2014–2015
Loret Sadiku	2 March 2014	2013	2014–2015
**Samir Ujkani**	2 March 2014	2008–2013	2014–
Debatik Curri	19 May 2014	2006–2013	2014
Mërgim Brahimi	7 October 2015	2012	2015
Alban Meha	15 August 2016	2012–2015	2016
**Milot Rashica**	15 August 2016	2016	2016–
Besart Berisha	16 August 2016	2006–2009	2017
**Amir Rrahmani**	22 August 2016	2014–2015	2016–
Herolind Shala	30 August 2016	2014–2016	2016–2021
**Fidan Aliti**	4 November 2016	2014	2017–
Kastriot Dermaku	31 August 2018 (Note: Kastriot Dermaku is the second player after Debatik Curri to briefly change the national team from Albania to Kosovo and from Kosovo to Albania.)	Has not debuted	2018
Gledi Mici	31 May 2021 (Note: Gledi Mici is the first player born and raised in Albania to accept to play for Kosovo, but could not make his debut as the club asked to release him from the squad in order to be as fresh as possible for the 2021–22 UEFA Champions League preliminary round matches.)	Has not debuted	2021

=== Kosovo then Albania ===
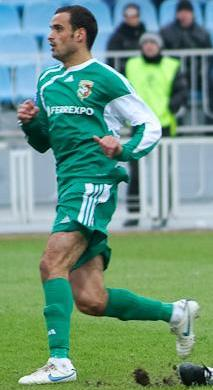
Debatik Curri is the first player to switch from Kosovo to Albania

Player	Date of switch	Kosovo career	Albania career
Debatik Curri	19 May 2014	2014	2014
Amir Rrahmani	6 June 2014	2014	2014–2015
Loret Sadiku	13 September 2018	2014–2015	2018
Kastriot Dermaku	2 October 2018	2018	2018–2021
**Ardian Ismajli**	30 October 2018	2018	2018–
**Arbnor Muja**	17 August 2023	2023	2023–
**Mirlind Daku**	1 September 2023	2020–2021	2023–

== See also ==
- Albania–Kosovo relations
