= 1993 Albania v Kosovo football match =

Albania v Kosovo
- Event: Friendly match
Albania	Kosovo
(Albania)	(Republic of Kosova)
3	1
- Date: 14 February 1993
- Venue: Selman Stërmasi Stadium, Tirana, Albania
- Referee: Bujar Pregja (Albania)
- Attendance: 14,000

The international friendly between the Albania and Kosovo national football teams on 14 February 1993 was the first match played by Kosovo after the partition of Football Federation of Kosovo from Football Association of Yugoslavia. It took place at the Selman Stërmasi Stadium in Tirana, Albania with 14,000 fans in attendance.

== Background ==
This match for Albania was the first match in 1993 after they were mathematically eliminated from 1994 FIFA World Cup qualification, but it was also a pre-preparation before the 1994 FIFA World Cup qualification match against Northern Ireland, where were tested players who were expected to play or make their debut in the match against Northern Ireland as Artan Bano, Ilir Shulku, Xhevahir Kapllani and several other players, while for Kosovo, this match was the first match in 1993 after 18 years since the last match that Kosovo had played against Macedonia in 1975 Brotherhood and Unity Tournament Final, which Kosovo won as group leader.

== Match ==
=== Organization ===
This match was scheduled to take place on 26 or 27 December 1992, but due to the non-participation of the general director of the Albanian Football Association, Eduard Dervishi, who was on an official trip, the date of the match was not decided. Meanwhile, on 19 January 1993, a delegation of the Football Federation of Kosovo composed of the head coach Ajet Shosholli, Enver Nuredini and Sejdi Merkoja met with the leaders of the Albanian Football Federation in a meeting that lasted until 20 January, when in same day a cooperation protocol was signed, where it was agreed that on 14 February there will be a friendly match between Albania and Kosovo which would take place at the Selman Stërmasi Stadium in the Albania's capital, Tirana.

==== Problems with organizing of Kosovo national team's trip ====
The organized departure of the expedition by Kosovo was unachievable, because the bus would be stopped at the border by Serbian Police and would turn back and the match would fail. It was decided that each member of the expedition, individually, would travel to Skopje from where the collective departure to Albania would take place. Thus, the bus that was going to transport Kosovo crossed the Macedonian border and arrived in Skopje empty, but even though all this was done in secret, two SDB agents were at the Kosovo national team's meeting place which was in the Grand Hotel in Skopje, but fortunately pass without incident.

=== Squads composition ===
All caps and goals as of 14 February 1993 after the match.

==== Albania ====
Player	Date of birth (age)	Caps	Goals	Club
Goalkeepers
Blendi Nallbani	30 May 1971 (aged 21)	6	0	(Albania) Tirana
Xhevahir Kapllani	21 June 1974 (aged 18)	1	0	(Albania) Teuta Durrës
Defenders
Eduard Abazi	29 November 1968 (aged 24)	10	1	(Austria) Grazer AK
Adnan Oçelli	6 August 1963 (aged 29)	9	0	(Albania) Partizani Tirana
Kastriot Peqini	19 February 1974 (aged 18)	7	0	(Albania) Elbasani
Ardian Abazi	9 April 1965 (aged 27)	1	0	(Albania) Teuta Durrës
Ilir Shulku	20 January 1971 (aged 22)	1	0	(Albania) Partizani Tirana
Midfielders
Salvador Kaçaj	23 October 1967 (aged 25)	4	0	(Greece) Athinaikos
Artan Bano	17 February 1966 (aged 26)	1	0	(Albania) Partizani Tirana
Shpëtim Kapidani	9 September 1971 (aged 21)	1	0	(Albania) Teuta Durrës
Alvaro Zalla	23 December 1973 (aged 19)	1	0	(Albania) Teuta Durrës
Forwards
Shkëlqim Muça	19 March 1960 (aged 32)	17	2	Retired
Indrit Fortuzi	23 November 1973 (aged 19)	3	1	(Albania) Dinamo Tirana
Edmond Dosti	5 February 1966 (aged 27)	2	0	(Albania) Partizani Tirana
Edmond Dalipi	13 December 1972 (aged 20)	1	0	(Albania) Dinamo Tirana
Skerdi Bejzade	30 November 1974 (aged 18)	1	0	(Albania) Dinamo Tirana

==== Kosovo ====
Player	Caps	Goals	Club
Ahmet Beselica (GK)	1	0	(Republic of Kosova) Prishtina
Xhelal Nushi (GK)	1	0	(Republic of Kosova) Vëllaznimi
Afrim Tovërlani	1	0	(Republic of Kosova) Prishtina
Ardian Kozniku	1	0	(Croatia) Hajduk Split
Avdullah Rafuna	1	0	(Republic of Kosova) Prishtina
Bardhec Seferi	1	0	(Republic of Kosova) Trepça
Bashkim Idrizi	1	0	(Republic of Kosova) Drenica
Bejtush Bejta	1	0	(Republic of Kosova) Llapi
Fadil Berisha	1	0	(Republic of Kosova) Prishtina
Gani Llapashtica	1	0	(Republic of Kosova) Prishtina
Genc Hoxha (c)	1	0	(Republic of Kosova) Vëllaznimi
Isa Sadriu	1	0	(Republic of Kosova) Prishtina
Kushtrim Munishi	1	1	(Republic of Kosova) Prishtina
Muharrem Sahiti	1	0	(Republic of Kosova) Drita
Sabit Osmani	1	0	(Republic of Kosova) Trepça
Sadullah Ajeti	1	0	(Republic of Kosova) Drita
Selajdin Jerliu	1	0	(Republic of Kosova) Drita
Adnan Aliu	0	0	(Republic of Kosova) Drita
Bashkim Radogoshi	0	0	(Republic of Kosova) Vëllaznimi
Ibrahim Domi	0	0	(Republic of Kosova) Vëllaznimi
Mehmet Bllacaku	0	0	(Republic of Kosova) Flamurtari
Ramiz Krasniqi	0	0	(Republic of Kosova) Flamurtari
Selim Ejupi	0	0	(Republic of Kosova) Flamurtari

=== Summary ===
14 February 1993
Friendly

Albania	3–1	Kosovo
Abazi 38'; Seferi 39' (o.g.); Fortuzi 42'	Report	Munishi 72'

Selman Stërmasi Stadium, Tirana, Albania
Attendance: 14,000
Referee: Bujar Pregja (Albania)

Starting line-up:
Xhevahir Kapllani (GK) (substituted off) 46'
Adnan Oçelli
Ardian Abazi
Edmond Dalipi
Edmond Dosti
Eduard Abazi (c) (yellow card) (substituted off) 46'
Ilir Shulku
Indrit Fortuzi (substituted off) 46'
Kastriot Peqini (substituted off) 46'
Salvador Kaçaj (substituted off) 46'
Shkëlqim Muça
Substitutions:
Blendi Nallbani (GK) (substituted on) 46'
Alvaro Zalla (substituted on) 46'
Artan Bano (substituted on) 46'
Skerdi Bejzade (substituted on) 46'
Shpëtim Kapidani (substituted on) 46'
Manager:
(Albania) Bejkush Birçe

Starting line-up:
Ahmet Beselica (GK) (substituted off) 58'
Ardian Kozniku
Bardhec Seferi
Fadil Berisha
Gani Llapashtica
Genc Hoxha (c) (substituted off) 64'
Isa Sadriu (substituted off) 65'
Kushtrim Munishi
Muharrem Sahiti (substituted off) 46'
Sadullah Ajeti (substituted off) 46'
Selajdin Jerliu (substituted off) 46'
Substitutions:
Xhelal Nushi (GK) (substituted on) 58'
Adnan Aliu
Afrim Tovërlani (substituted on) 64'
Avdullah Rafuna (substituted on) 65'
Bashkim Idrizi (substituted on) 46'
Bashkim Radogoshi
Bejtush Bejta (substituted on) 46'
Ibrahim Domi
Mehmet Bllacaku
Ramiz Krasniqi
Sabit Osmani (substituted on) 46'
Selim Ejupi
Manager:
(Republic of Kosova) Ajet Shosholli
