= Kosovo national football team results (1993–2019) =

- Win Draw Loss Void

This is a list of Kosovo national football team results from 1993 to 2019.

== History ==
=== First match ===
On 14 February 1993. Following the breakup of Yugoslavia, the first match of Kosovo was played and it was against Albania and the match ended with a 1–3 away defeat and the starting line-up of that match was Ahmet Beselica, Ardian Kozniku, Bardhyl Seferi, Fadil Berisha, Gani Llapashtica, Genc Hoxha, Isa Sadriu, Kushtrim Munishi, Muharrem Sahiti, Sadullah Ajeti and Selaudin Jerlini.

=== 2002–2010 ===
On 7 September 2002, Kosovo for first time after the Kosovo War played a friendly match against Albania and the match ended with a 0–1 home minimal defeat and the starting line-up of that match was Ahmet Beselica, Ardian Kozniku, Arsim Abazi, Besnik Kollari, Fadil Ademi, Faruk Statovci, Ismet Munishi, Mehmet Dragusha, Sunaj Keqi, Xhevdet Llumnica and Zenun Selimi.

Five games were played after the match against Albania, one of the most important international matches was a 1–0 win over Saudi Arabia played on 15 June 2007. It was the first time that Kosovo played against a team that has taken part in the FIFA World Cup and the winning goal was scored by Kristian Nushi from the penalty kick on the 84th minute.

On 17 February 2010 for first time since the declaration of independence, Kosovo played a friendly match against Albania and the match ended with a 2–3 home defeat. The starting line-up of that match was Anel Rashkaj, Dukagjin Gashi, Enis Zabërgja, Fisnik Papuçi, Ilir Nallbani, Kushtrim Mushica, Liridon Kukaj, Robert Gjeraj, Shpëtim Hasani and Yll Hoxha. This match had a humanitarian character, because the profits gathered from this meeting will go to those affected by floods in Shkodër.

=== 2014–2015 ===

Kosovo starting line-up in first international friendly against Haiti
(4–3–3)

After four years pause and following FIFA's ruling for permitting to play friendlies, on 5 March 2014, Kosovo played its first international friendly against Haiti and the match ended in a 0–0 draw. After the match against Haiti, five more games were held with Turkey, Senegal, Oman, Equatorial Guinea and in the end with Albania. The first win in these friendlies was against Oman with a 1–0 home minimal win, while the biggest defeat that was simultaneously also the first defeat was a 1–6 home defeat against Turkey that was playing with players that were the majority from Turkish championship.

=== 2016–present ===
On 3 June 2016, Kosovo played its first international friendly after the membership in UEFA and FIFA against Faroe Islands and the match ended in a 2–0 win.

==== Participation in 2018 FIFA World Cup qualifications ====
On 9 June 2016, The UEFA Emergency Panel has decided that Kosovo will join Croatia, Finland, Iceland, Turkey and Ukraine in Group I, also decided that Bosnia and Herzegovina and Serbia should not play against Kosovo for security reasons. On 5 September 2016, Kosovo made their debut on FIFA World Cup qualifications with a 1–1 away draw against Finland and the draw goal was scored by the newcomer Valon Berisha from the penalty kick on the 60th minute. Kosovo finished these qualifications with nine losses and a draw and that brought the resignation of the coach at that time, Albert Bunjaki.

==== Return to positive results ====
After the weak results during 2018 FIFA World Cup qualifications and resignation of the coach at that time, Albert Bunjaki. The Former Kosovo international midfielder and assistant coach of Kosovo during Bunjaki era, Muharrem Sahiti was appointed as caretaker manager and his duty was the return to positive results, which he accomplished on 13 November 2017 when Kosovo won the first match at home in Mitrovica against Latvia with result 4–3.

On 2 March 2018, Kosovo signed with Bernard Challandes to a two-year contract and after 22 days from receiving the manager post, he won the first match against Madagascar with result 1–0. Challandes continued his work in leave in half by the Sahiti and despite the victory over Madagascar, I won other friendly matches as against Burkina Faso and Albania, while 2018 continues with debut on UEFA Nations League with a 0–0 away draw against Azerbaijan, the first win in UEFA Nations League that was simultaneously also the first-ever competitive win was a 2–0 home win against Faroe Islands and the culmination was positioning in first place and promoting in League C in the next season of UEFA Nations League.

== Fixtures and results ==
The following is a list of matches of Kosovo since 1993.

=== Unofficial ===
14 February 1993 Friendly	Albania	3–1	Kosovo	Tirana, Albania
	Abazi 38'; Seferi 39' (o.g.); Fortuzi 42'	Report	Munishi 72'	Stadium: Selman Stërmasi Stadium; Attendance: 14,000; Referee: Bujar Pregja (Albania)

7 September 2002 Friendly	Kosovo	0–1	Albania	Pristina, Kosovo under UN administration
		Report; Report (RSSSF)	Abazi 45' (o.g.)	Stadium: Pristina City Stadium; Attendance: 25,000; Referee: Bekim Pakuja (Macedonia)

2 November 2005 KTFF 50th Anniversary Cup	Northern Cyprus	1–0	Kosovo	North Nicosia, Northern Cyprus
	Tarik 57'	Report (NFT); Report (RSSSF)		Stadium: Nicosia Atatürk Stadium; Referee: Mehmet Malek (Northern Cyprus)

3 November 2005 KTFF 50th Anniversary Cup	Kosovo	4–1	Sápmi	Girne, Northern Cyprus
	Hasani 39' (pen.); Brando 55'; Nallbani 59'; Ramushi 78'	Report	Johanssen 79'	Stadium: 20 Temmuz Stadium; Attendance: 200

22 April 2006 Friendly	Monaco	1–7	Kosovo	Cap d'Ail, France
	unknown (??)	Report (1st); Report (2nd)	Zeka 15'; Emra 17', 65'; Gashi 29'; Keqi 75'; Llumnica 82'; Idrizi 83'	Stadium: Cap d'Ail Stadium

15 June 2007 Friendly	Kosovo	1–0	Saudi Arabia	Ankara, Turkey
	Nushi 80' (pen.)	Report

17 June 2007 Friendly	Oman	Canceled	Kosovo	Geneva, Switzerland
		Report

17 February 2010 Friendly	Kosovo	2–3	Albania	Pristina, Kosovo
	Hasani 31'; Gashi 75'	Report (1st); Report (2nd)	Bicaj 4'; Muzaka 31' (pen.); Balaj 90+2'	Stadium: Pristina City Stadium; Attendance: 10,000

=== Official ===
==== 2014 ====
5 March Friendly	Kosovo	0–0	Haiti	Mitrovica, Kosovo
15:00 GMT+2		Report		Stadium: Adem Jashari Olympic Stadium; Attendance: 17,000; Referee: Stephan Klossner (Switzerland)

21 May Friendly	Kosovo	1–6	Turkey	Mitrovica, Kosovo
16:00 GMT	A. Bunjaku 35'	Report	Özek 2'; Kısa 34'; Şahan 49'; Pektemek 54', 71'; Potuk 86' (pen.)	Stadium: Adem Jashari Olympic Stadium; Attendance: 17,000; Referee: Bardhyl Pashaj (Albania)

25 May Friendly	Kosovo	1–3	Senegal	Geneva, Switzerland
15:00 GMT	A. Bunjaku 25'	Report	Niasse 41', 49'; Sakho 50'	Stadium: Stade de Genève; Attendance: 13,143; Referee: Stephan Klossner (Switzerland)

7 September Friendly	Kosovo	1–0	Oman	Pristina, Kosovo
16:00 GMT	I. Bunjaku 84'	Report		Stadium: Pristina City Stadium; Attendance: 10,700; Referee: Lorenc Jemini (Albania)

9 October Friendly	Panama	Canceled	Kosovo	New York, United States
		Report

12 October Friendly	Canada	Canceled	Kosovo	Chicago, United States
		Report

==== 2015 ====
2 September Friendly	Kosovo	Canceled	Burkina Faso	Pristina, Kosovo
				Stadium: Pristina City Stadium
Note: The match was canceled after Burkina Faso did not make the changes required by Football Federation of Kosovo, sending only the list of U23 players.

10 October Friendly	Kosovo	2–0	Equatorial Guinea	Pristina, Kosovo
15:00 CEST	Brahimi 2', 47'	Report		Stadium: Pristina City Stadium; Attendance: 6,700; Referee: Enea Jorgji (Albania)

13 November Friendly	Kosovo	2–2	Albania	Pristina, Kosovo
14:00 UTC+1	Celina 58' (pen.); Rashani 69'	Report	Manaj 54'; Rrahmani 73'	Stadium: Pristina City Stadium; Attendance: 38,000 (record); Referee: Lorenc Jemini (Albania)

==== 2016 ====
28 May Friendly	Kosovo	Canceled	Central African Republic
		Report (1st); Report (2nd)

3 June Friendly	Kosovo	2–0	Faroe Islands	Frankfurt, Germany
20:00 UTC+2	A. Bunjaku 43'; Rashani 90+4'	Report		Stadium: Frankfurter Volksbank Stadion; Attendance: 7,000; Referee: Alexandre Boucaut (Belgium)

5 September 2018 FIFA World Cup qualification	Finland	1–1	Kosovo	Turku, Finland
20:45 UTC+1	Arajuuri 18'	Report (FIFA); Report (UEFA)	V. Berisha 60' (pen.)	Stadium: Veritas Stadion; Attendance: 7,571; Referee: Ivan Kružliak (Slovakia)

6 October 2018 FIFA World Cup qualification	Kosovo	0–6	Croatia	Shkodër, Albania (Note: After stadiums in Mitrovica and Pristina were under renovation and do not meet UEFA standards. Kosovo played the qualifying matches of the 2018 FIFA World Cup in Loro Boriçi Stadium (Albanian: Stadiumi Loro Boriçi), a multi-use stadium in Shkodër, Albania.)
20:45 UTC+1		Report (FIFA); Report (UEFA)	Mandžukić 6', 24', 35'; Mitrović 68'; Perišić 83'; N. Kalinić 90+2'	Stadium: Loro Boriçi Stadium; Attendance: 14,612; Referee: David Fernández Borbalán (Spain)

9 October 2018 FIFA World Cup qualification	Ukraine	3–0	Kosovo	Kraków, Poland (Note: The Ukraine v Kosovo match was played in a neutral venue due to Ukraine's non-recognition of Kosovo's travel documents.)
18:00 UTC+1	Kravets 31'; Yarmolenko 81'; Rotan 87'	Report (FIFA); Report (UEFA)		Stadium: Marshal Józef Piłsudski Stadium; Attendance: 999; Referee: Kevin Blom (Netherlands)

12 November 2018 FIFA World Cup qualification	Turkey	2–0	Kosovo	Antalya, Turkey
18:00 UTC+1	Yılmaz 51'; Şen 55'	Report (FIFA); Report (UEFA)		Stadium: New Antalya Stadium; Attendance: 26,555; Referee: Tamás Bognár (Hungary)

==== 2017 ====
24 March 2018 FIFA World Cup qualification	Kosovo	1–2	Iceland	Shkodër, Albania
20:45 (UTC+1)	Nuhiu 52'	Report (FIFA); Report (UEFA)	Sigurdarson 25'; Sigurðsson 35' (pen.)	Stadium: Loro Boriçi Stadium; Attendance: 6,832; Referee: Artur Soares Dias (Portugal)

11 June 2018 FIFA World Cup qualification	Kosovo	1–4	Turkey	Shkodër, Albania
20:45 UTC+1	Rrahmani 22'	Report (FIFA); Report (UEFA)	Şen 6'; Ünder 31'; Yılmaz 61'; Tufan 82'	Stadium: Loro Boriçi Stadium; Attendance: 6,000; Referee: Miroslav Zelinka (Czech Republic)

2 September 2018 FIFA World Cup qualification	Croatia	1–0	Kosovo	Zagreb, Croatia
20:45 UTC+1	Vida 74'	Report (FIFA); Report (UEFA)		Stadium: Stadion Maksimir; Attendance: 6,839; Referee: Stefan Johannesson (Sweden)
Note: The match was suspended after 22 minutes due to torrential rain, with the score 0–0 at the time. On 3 September 2017, the match was resumed in 14:30 (UTC+1).

5 September 2018 FIFA World Cup qualification	Kosovo	0–1	Finland	Shkodër, Albania
20:45 (UTC+1)		Report (FIFA); Report (UEFA)	Pukki 83'	Stadium: Loro Boriçi Stadium; Attendance: 2,446; Referee: Manuel Schüttengruber (Austria)

6 October 2018 FIFA World Cup qualification	Kosovo	0–2	Ukraine	Shkodër, Albania
20:45 (UTC+1)		Report (FIFA); Report (UEFA)	Paqarada 60' (o.g.); Yarmolenko 87'	Stadium: Loro Boriçi Stadium; Attendance: 1,261; Referee: Craig Pawson (England)

9 October 2018 FIFA World Cup qualification	Iceland	2–0	Kosovo	Reykjavík, Iceland
20:45 (UTC+1)	Sigurðsson 40'; Guðmundsson 68'	Report (FIFA); Report (UEFA)		Stadium: Laugardalsvöllur; Attendance: 9,775; Referee: Harald Lechner (Austria)

13 November Friendly	Kosovo	4–3	Latvia	Mitrovica, Kosovo
19:30 (UTC+1)	Rrahmani 13'; Muriqi 45'; Rashani 86'; Halimi 90+4'	Report	Kļuškins 11'; Ikaunieks 31'; Siņeļņikovs 59'	Stadium: Adem Jashari Olympic Stadium; Attendance: 5,116; Referee: Enea Jorgji (Albania)

==== 2018 ====
2 February Friendly	Azerbaijan	Canceled	Kosovo	Aksu, Turkey
16:00 (UTC+1)				Stadium: Mardan Sports Complex
Note: On 24 January 2018. The match Azerbaijan–Kosovo was canceled due to that Azerbaijan and Kosovo will compete in the same group in the 2018–19 UEFA Nations League.

24 March Friendly	Kosovo	1–0	Madagascar	Franconville, France
19:10 (UTC+1)	Zhegrova 47'	Report		Stadium: Stade Municipal Jean Rolland; Attendance: 2,500; Referee: William Lavis (France)

27 March Friendly	Kosovo	2–0	Burkina Faso	Franconville, France
18:00 (UTC+1)	Muriqi 74'; Paqarada 89'	Report		Stadium: Stade Municipal Jean Rolland; Attendance: 800; Referee: Faouzi Benchabane (France)

29 May Friendly	Kosovo	3–0	Albania	Zürich, Switzerland
20:00 (UTC+1)	Zeneli 20', 51'; Zhegrova 67'	Report		Stadium: Letzigrund; Attendance: 18,700; Referee: Alain Bieri (Switzerland)

3 June Friendly	Kosovo	Canceled	Ivory Coast	Wohlen, Switzerland
15:00 (UTC+1)				Stadium: Stadion Niedermatten; Referee: Adrien Jaccottet (Switzerland)
Note: The match Kosovo–Ivory Coast was canceled due to the internal problems of Ivory Coast national team.

3 June Friendly	Kosovo	Canceled	Iran	Istanbul, Turkey
15:00 (UTC+1)				Stadium: Başakşehir Fatih Terim Stadium
Note: The match Kosovo–Iran was canceled due to the Kosovo national team refused to play behind closed-doors.

7 September 2018–19 UEFA Nations League	Azerbaijan	0–0	Kosovo	Baku, Azerbaijan
18:00 (UTC+1)		Report		Stadium: Baku Olympic Stadium; Attendance: 19.500; Referee: Ola Hobber Nilsen (Norway)

10 September 2018–19 UEFA Nations League	Kosovo	2–0	Faroe Islands	Pristina, Kosovo
20:45 (UTC+1)	Zeneli 50'; Nuhiu 55'	Report		Stadium: Fadil Vokrri Stadium; Attendance: 12,667; Referee: Bart Vertenten (Belgium)

11 October 2018–19 UEFA Nations League	Kosovo	3–1	Malta	Pristina, Kosovo
20:45 (UTC+1)	Kololli 30', 81'; Muriqi 68'	Report	Agius 51'	Stadium: Fadil Vokrri Stadium; Attendance: 13,000; Referee: Tamás Bognár (Hungary)

14 October 2018–19 UEFA Nations League	Faroe Islands	1–1	Kosovo	Tórshavn, Faroe Islands
18:00 (UTC+1)	Joensen 50'	Report	Rashica 9'	Stadium: Tórsvøllur; Referee: Miroslav Zelinka (Czech Republic)

17 November 2018–19 UEFA Nations League	Malta	0–5	Kosovo	Ta' Qali, Malta
18:00 (UTC+1)		Report	Muriqi 15'; Kololli 70'; Avdijaj 78', 80'; Rashica 86'	Stadium: National Stadium; Referee: Bartosz Frankowski (Poland)

20 November 2018–19 UEFA Nations League	Kosovo	4–0	Azerbaijan	Pristina, Kosovo
20:45 (UTC+1)	Zeneli 2', 50', 76'; Rrahmani 61'	Report		Stadium: Fadil Vokrri Stadium; Referee: Benoît Millot (France)

==== 2019 ====
21 March Friendly	Kosovo	2–2	Denmark	Pristina, Kosovo
19:00 (UTC+1)	Rrahmani 42'; Celina 66'	Report	Eriksen 63' (pen.); Højbjerg 90+1'	Stadium: Fadil Vokrri Stadium; Attendance: 13,000; Referee: Ali Palabıyık (Turkey)

25 March UEFA Euro 2020 qualifying	Kosovo	1–1	Bulgaria	Pristina, Kosovo
20:45 (UTC+1)	Zeneli 61'	Report	Bozhikov 39'	Stadium: Fadil Vokrri Stadium; Attendance: 12,580; Referee: Gediminas Mažeika (Lithuania)

7 June UEFA Euro 2020 qualifying	Montenegro	1–1	Kosovo	Podgorica, Montenegro
20:45 (UTC+1)	Mugoša 69'	Report	Rashica 24'	Stadium: Podgorica City Stadium; Attendance: 100 (Note: The Montenegro v Kosovo match was played behind closed doors due to of a sanction imposed on Montenegro after charges for racist behaviour in their home match against England.); Referee: Daniele Orsato (Italy)

10 June UEFA Euro 2020 qualifying	Bulgaria	2–3	Kosovo	Sofia, Bulgaria
20:45 (UTC+1)	Popov 43'; Dimitrov 55'	Report	Rashica 14'; Muriqi 64'; Rashani 90+3'	Stadium: Vasil Levski National Stadium; Attendance: 4,994; Referee: Mads-Kristoffer Kristoffersen (Denmark)

7 September UEFA Euro 2020 qualifying	Kosovo	2–1	Czech Republic	Pristina, Kosovo
15:00 (UTC+1)	Muriqi 20'; Vojvoda 66'	Report	Schick 16'	Stadium: Fadil Vokrri Stadium; Attendance: 13,000; Referee: Danny Makkelie (Netherlands)

10 September UEFA Euro 2020 qualifying	England	5–3	Kosovo	Southampton, England
19:45 (UTC+1)	Sterling 8'; Kane 19'; Vojvoda 38' (o.g.); Sancho 44', 45+1'	Report	V. Berisha 1', 49'; Muriqi 55' (pen.)	Stadium: St Mary's Stadium; Attendance: 30,155; Referee: Felix Zwayer (Germany)

10 October Friendly	Kosovo	1–0	Gibraltar	Pristina, Kosovo
18:00 (UTC+1)	Hasani 69'	Report		Stadium: Fadil Vokrri Stadium; Attendance: 12,142; Referee: Junxhin Xhaja (Albania)

14 October UEFA Euro 2020 qualifying	Kosovo	2–0	Montenegro	Pristina, Kosovo
20:45 (UTC+1)	Rrahmani 10'; Muriqi 35'	Report		Stadium: Fadil Vokrri Stadium; Attendance: 12,494; Referee: Artur Soares Dias (Portugal)

14 November UEFA Euro 2020 qualifying	Czech Republic	2–1	Kosovo	Plzeň, Czech Republic
20:45 (UTC+1)	Král 71'; Čelůstka 79'	Report	Nuhiu 50'	Stadium: Doosan Arena; Attendance: 10,986; Referee: Gianluca Rocchi (Italy)

17 November UEFA Euro 2020 qualifying	Kosovo	0–4	England	Pristina, Kosovo
18:00 (UTC+1)		Report	Winks 32'; Kane 79'; Rashford 83'; Mount 90+1'	Stadium: Fadil Vokrri Stadium; Attendance: 13,000; Referee: Paweł Gil (Poland)

== Kosovo versus other countries ==
As of 17 November 2019

Opponent	Pld	W	D	L	GF	GA	GD	Win %	Reference
Albania	5	1	1	3	8	9	−1	20.00	H2H results
Azerbaijan	2	1	1	0	4	0	+4	50.00	H2H results
Bulgaria	2	1	1	0	4	3	+1	50.00	H2H results
Burkina Faso	1	1	0	0	2	0	+2	100.00	H2H results
Croatia	2	0	0	2	0	7	−7	0.00	H2H results
Czech Republic	2	1	0	1	3	3	+0	50.00	H2H results
Denmark	1	0	1	0	2	2	+0	0.00	H2H results
England	2	0	0	2	3	9	−6	0.00	H2H results
Equatorial Guinea	1	1	0	0	2	0	+2	100.00	H2H results
Faroe Islands	3	2	1	0	5	1	+4	66.67	H2H results
Finland	2	0	1	1	1	2	−1	0.00	H2H results
Gibraltar	1	1	0	0	1	0	+1	100.00	H2H results
Haiti	1	0	1	0	0	0	+0	0.00	H2H results
Iceland	2	0	0	2	1	4	−3	0.00	H2H results
Latvia	1	1	0	0	4	3	+1	100.00	H2H results
Madagascar	1	1	0	0	1	0	+1	100.00	H2H results
Malta	2	2	0	0	8	1	+7	100.00	H2H results
Monaco	1	1	0	0	7	1	+6	100.00	H2H results
Montenegro	2	1	1	0	3	1	+2	50.00	H2H results
Northern Cyprus	1	0	0	1	0	1	−1	0.00	H2H results
Oman	1	1	0	0	1	0	+1	100.00	H2H results
Sápmi	1	1	0	0	4	1	+3	100.00	—N/a
Saudi Arabia	1	1	0	0	1	0	+1	100.00	H2H results
Senegal	1	0	0	1	1	3	−2	0.00	H2H results
Turkey	3	0	0	3	2	12	−10	0.00	H2H results H2H results
Ukraine	2	0	0	2	0	5	−5	0.00	H2H results
24 Countries	39	15	8	16	62	61	+1	38.46	All H2H results
