= Albania national football team results (2020–present) =

This is a list of Albania national football team results from 2020 to 2029.

== Fixtures and results ==
=== 2020 ===
27 March (Note: The San Marino v Albania match, originally scheduled for 27 March 2020 at the San Marino Stadium, Serravalle was canceled on 17 March due to the coronavirus.) Friendly	San Marino	Cancelled	Albania	Serravalle, San Marino
				Stadium: San Marino Stadium

30 March (Note: The Slovenia v Albania match, originally scheduled for 30 March 2020 at the Bonifika Stadium, Koper was canceled on 17 March due to the coronavirus.) Friendly	Slovenia	Cancelled	Albania	Koper, Slovenia (Note: The match was originally planned to take place as a home at the Stadio Friuli in Udine, but due to coronavirus, the match will take place as a away at Bonifika Stadium in Koper.)
20:45 (UTC+1)		Report		Stadium: Bonifika Stadium

4 September 2020–21 UEFA Nations League	Belarus	0–2	Albania	Minsk, Belarus
20:45 (CEST; UTC+03:00)		Report	Cikalleshi 23'; Bare 78'	Stadium: Dinamo Stadium; Attendance: 0 Referee: Kristoffer Karlsson (Sweden)

7 September 2020–21 UEFA Nations League	Albania	0–1	Lithuania	Tirana, Albania
20:45 (CEST; UTC+02:00)		Report	Kazlauskas 51'	Stadium: Arena Kombëtare; Attendance: 0 Referee: Serhiy Boyko (Ukraine)

7 October Friendly	Armenia	Cancelled	Albania	Yerevan, Armenia
				Stadium: Vazgen Sargsyan Republican Stadium

11 October 2020–21 UEFA Nations League	Kazakhstan	0–0	Albania	Almaty, Kazakhstan
15:00 (CEST; UTC+06:00)		Report		Stadium: Central Stadium; Attendance: 0 Referee: Dumitru Muntean (Moldova)

14 October 2020–21 UEFA Nations League	Lithuania	0–0	Albania	Vilnius, Lithuania
18:00 (CEST; UTC+03:00)		Report		Stadium: LFF Stadium; Attendance: 696; Referee: Karim Abed (France)

11 November Friendly	Albania	Cancelled	Gibraltar	Elbasan, Albania
19:00 (CET; UTC+01:00)				Stadium: Elbasan Arena

11 November Friendly (Brotherly derby)	Albania	2–1	Kosovo	Elbasan, Albania
16:00 (CET; UTC+01:00)	Balaj 31'; Uzuni 65'	Report; Report (UEFA)	Muriqi 85' (pen.)	Stadium: Elbasan Arena; Attendance: 0 Referee: Hüseyin Göçek (Turkey)

15 November 2020–21 UEFA Nations League	Albania	3–1	Kazakhstan	Tirana, Albania
18:00 (CET; UTC+01:00)	Cikalleshi 16'; Ismajli 23'; Manaj 63' (pen.)	Report	Abiken 25'	Stadium: Arena Kombëtare; Attendance: 0 Referee: Xavier Estrada Fernández (Spain)

18 November 2020–21 UEFA Nations League	Albania	3–2	Belarus	Tirana, Albania
16:00 (CET; UTC+01:00)	Cikalleshi 20', 27' (pen.); Manaj 44'	Report	Skavysh 35'; Ebong 80'	Stadium: Arena Kombëtare; Attendance: 0 Referee: Radu Petrescu (Romania)

=== 2021 ===
25 March 2022 FIFA World Cup qualification	Andorra	0–1	Albania	Andorra la Vella, Andorra
20:45		Report (FIFA); Report (UEFA)	Lenjani 41'	Stadium: Estadi Nacional; Attendance: 0 Referee: Volen Chinkov (Bulgaria)

28 March 2022 FIFA World Cup qualification	Albania	0–2	England	Tirana, Albania
18:00		Report (FIFA); Report (UEFA)	Kane 38'; Mount 63'	Stadium: Arena Kombëtare; Attendance: 0 Referee: Orel Grinfeld (Israel)

31 March 2022 FIFA World Cup qualification	San Marino	0–2	Albania	Serravalle, San Marino
20:45		Report (FIFA); Report (UEFA)	Manaj 63'; Uzuni 85'	Stadium: San Marino Stadium; Attendance: 0 Referee: Kai Erik Steen (Norway)

5 June Friendly	Wales	0–0	Albania	Cardiff, Wales
18:00		Report		Stadium: Cardiff City Stadium; Attendance: 6,500; Referee: Neil Doyle (Republic of Ireland)

8 June Friendly	Czech Republic	3–1	Albania	Prague, Czech Republic
20:15	Schick 18'; Masopust 68'; Čelůstka 89'	Report	Cikalleshi 42'	Stadium: Stadion Letná; Attendance: 620; Referee: Peter Kralović (Slovakia)

2 September 2022 FIFA World Cup qualification	Poland	4–1	Albania	Warsaw, Poland
20:45	Lewandowski 12'; Buksa 44'; Krychowiak 54'; Linetty 89'	Report (FIFA); Report (UEFA)	Cikalleshi 25'	Stadium: PGE Narodowy; Attendance: 38,254; Referee: Maurizio Mariani (Italy)

5 September 2022 FIFA World Cup qualification	Albania	1–0	Hungary	Elbasan, Albania
18:00	Broja 87'	Report (FIFA); Report (UEFA)	4,135	Stadium: Elbasan Arena; Referee: Danny Makkelie (Netherlands)

8 September 2022 FIFA World Cup qualification	Albania	5–0	San Marino	Elbasan, Albania
20:45	Manaj 32'; Laçi 58'; Broja 61'; Hysaj 68'; Uzuni 80'	Report (FIFA); Report (UEFA)	3,850	Stadium: Elbasan Arena; Referee: Lukas Fähndrich (Switzerland)

9 October 2022 FIFA World Cup qualification	Hungary	0–1	Albania	Budapest, Hungary
20:45		Report (FIFA); Report (UEFA)	Broja 80'	Stadium: Puskás Aréna; Attendance: 0 Referee: Carlos del Cerro Grande (Spain)

12 October 2022 FIFA World Cup qualification	Albania	0–1	Poland	Tirana, Albania
20:45		Report (FIFA); Report (UEFA)	Świderski 77'	Stadium: Arena Kombëtare; Attendance: 21,000; Referee: Clément Turpin (France)

12 November 2022 FIFA World Cup qualification	England	5–0	Albania	London, England
20:45 (19:45; UTC±0)	Maguire 9'; Kane 18', 33', 45+2'; Henderson 28'	Report (FIFA); Report (UEFA)		Stadium: Wembley Stadium; Attendance: 80,366; Referee: Felix Zwayer (Germany)

15 November 2022 FIFA World Cup qualification	Albania	1–0	Andorra	Tirana, Albania
20:45	Çekiçi 73' (pen.)	Report (FIFA); Report (UEFA)		Stadium: Arena Kombëtare; Attendance: 75; Referee: Andris Treimanis (Latvia)

=== 2022 ===
26 March Friendly	Spain	2–1	Albania	Cornellà de Llobregat, Spain
19:45	F. Torres 75'; Olmo 90'	Report	Uzuni 85'	Stadium: RCDE Stadium; Attendance: 35,444; Referee: Trustin Farrugia Cann (Malta)

29 March Friendly	Albania	0–0	Georgia	Tirana, Albania
18:00		Report		Stadium: Arena Kombëtare; Referee: Nikola Dabanović (Montenegro)

2 June 2022–23 UEFA Nations League	Albania	Cancelled (Note: On 2 May 2022, UEFA announced that Russia were suspended and automatically relegated to League C due to their country's invasion of Ukraine.)	Russia	Tirana, Albania
20:45		Report		Stadium: Arena Kombëtare

6 June 2022–23 UEFA Nations League	Iceland	1–1	Albania	Reykjavík, Iceland
20:45 (18:45; UTC±0)	Þorsteinsson 49'	Report	Seferi 30'	Stadium: Laugardalsvöllur; Attendance: 4,033; Referee: Craig Pawson (England)

10 June 2022–23 UEFA Nations League	Albania	1–2	Israel	Tirana, Albania
20:45	Broja 45+2' (pen.)	Report	Solomon 57', 73'	Stadium: Arena Kombëtare; Attendance: 18,100; Referee: Tiago Martins (Portugal)

13 June 2022–23 UEFA Nations League	Russia	Cancelled	Albania	Moscow, Russia
20:45 (21:45; UTC+3)		Report		Stadium: VTB Arena

13 June Friendly	Albania	0–0	Estonia	Tirana, Albania
18:00		Report		Stadium: Arena Kombëtare; Referee: Philip Farrugia (Malta)

24 September 2022–23 UEFA Nations League	Israel	2–1	Albania	Tel Aviv, Israel
20:45 (21:45; UTC+3)	Weissman 46'; Baribo 90+1'	Report	Uzuni 88'	Stadium: Bloomfield Stadium; Attendance: 29,200; Referee: Donatas Rumšas (Lithuania)

27 September 2022–23 UEFA Nations League	Albania	1–1	Iceland	Tirana, Albania
20:45	Lenjani 35'	Report	Anderson 90+7'	Stadium: Arena Kombëtare; Attendance: 8,800; Referee: Ricardo de Burgos Bengoetxea (Spain)

26 October Friendly	Saudi Arabia	1–1	Albania	Abu Dhabi, United Arab Emirates
16:30	Al-Shehri 43' (pen.)	Report	Balaj 47'	Stadium: Al Nahyan Stadium; Attendance: 0 Referee: Adel Al Naqbi (United Arab Emirates)

9 November Friendly	Qatar	1–0	Albania	Marbella, Spain
18:30	Ali 37' (pen.)	Report		Stadium: Estadio Municipal de Marbella; Attendance: 0 Referee: Jason Barcelo (Gibraltar)

16 November Friendly	Albania	1–3	Italy	Tirana, Albania
20:45	Ismajli 16'	Report	Di Lorenzo 20'; Grifo 25', 64'	Stadium: Arena Kombëtare; Attendance: 22,000; Referee: Genc Nuza (Kosovo)

19 November Friendly (Brotherly derby)	Albania	Canceled	Kosovo	Germany or Switzerland
Note: The match was canceled due to lack of logistics as no suitable stadium was found to play the match.

19 November Friendly	Albania	2–0	Armenia	Tirana, Albania
17:30	Skuka 28'; Asllani 64' (pen.)	Report		Stadium: Arena Kombëtare; Referee: Aleksandar Stavrev (North Macedonia)

=== 2023 ===
27 March UEFA Euro 2024 qualifying	Poland	1–0	Albania	Warsaw, Poland
20:45	Świderski 41'	Report		Stadium: Stadion Narodowy; Attendance: 56,227; Referee: Slavko Vinčić (Slovenia)

17 June UEFA Euro 2024 qualifying	Albania	2–0	Moldova	Tirana, Albania
20:45	Asani 52'; Bajrami 76'	Report		Stadium: Arena Kombëtare; Attendance: 20,944; Referee: Dennis Higler (Netherlands)

20 June UEFA Euro 2024 qualifying	Faroe Islands	1–3	Albania	Tórshavn, Faroe Islands
20:45 (19:45 UTC+1)	Færø 45+1'	Report	Bajrami 20'; Asllani 51'; Muçi 90+1'	Stadium: Tórsvøllur; Attendance: 2,507; Referee: Chrysovalantis Theouli (Cyprus)

7 September UEFA Euro 2024 qualifying	Czech Republic	1–1	Albania	Prague, Czech Republic
20:45	Černý 56'	Report	Bajrami 66'	Stadium: Eden Arena; Attendance: 18,641; Referee: Anthony Taylor (England)

10 September UEFA Euro 2024 qualifying	Albania	2–0	Poland	Tirana, Albania
20:45	Asani 37'; Daku 62'	Report		Stadium: Arena Kombëtare; Attendance: 21,900; Referee: José María Sánchez (Spain)

12 October UEFA Euro 2024 qualifying	Albania	3–0	Czech Republic	Tirana, Albania
20:45	Asani 9'; Seferi 51', 73'	Report		Stadium: Arena Kombëtare; Attendance: 20,917; Referee: Danny Makkelie (Netherlands)

17 October Friendly	Albania	2–0	Bulgaria	Tirana, Albania
16:30	Laçi 41'; Muçi 81'	Report		Stadium: Arena Kombëtare; Attendance: 17,232; Referee: Mervan Bejtullahu (Kosovo)

17 November UEFA Euro 2024 qualifying	Moldova	1–1	Albania	Chişinău, Moldova
20:45 (21:45 UTC+2)	Baboglo 87'	Report	Çikalleshi 25' (pen.)	Stadium: Zimbru Stadium; Attendance: 9,537; Referee: Willie Collum (Scotland)

20 November UEFA Euro 2024 qualifying	Albania	0–0	Faroe Islands	Tirana, Albania
20:45		Report		Stadium: Arena Kombëtare; Attendance: 21,456; Referee: Sven Jablonski (Germany)

=== 2024 ===
22 March Friendly	Albania	0–3	Chile	Parma, Italy
20:45 UTC+1		Report	Vargas 19'; Bolados 83'; Dávila 90+2'	Stadium: Stadio Ennio Tardini; Attendance: 15,000; Referee: Luca Pairetto (Italy)

25 March Friendly	Sweden	1–0	Albania	Solna, Sweden
19:00 UTC+1	Nilsson 62'	Report		Stadium: Friends Arena; Attendance: 25,342; Referee: Marcel Bîrsan (Romania)

3 June Friendly	Albania	3–0	Liechtenstein	Szombathely, Hungary
19:00 UTC+2	Broja 31'; Asani 47'; Muçi 67'	Report		Stadium: Haladás Sportkomplexum; Attendance: 200; Referee: Bence Csonka (Hungary)

7 June Friendly	Albania	3–1	Azerbaijan	Szombathely, Hungary
18:00 UTC+2	Bajrami 12'; Manaj 81'; Laçi 88'	Report	Qurbanlı 90'	Stadium: Haladás Sportkomplexum; Referee: Mihály Káprály (Hungary)

15 June UEFA Euro 2024 Group B	Italy	2–1	Albania	Dortmund, Germany
21:00 CEST	Bastoni 11'; Barella 16'	Report	Bajrami 1'	Stadium: Westfalenstadion; Attendance: 60,512; Referee: Felix Zwayer (Germany)

19 June UEFA Euro 2024 Group B	Croatia	2–2	Albania	Hamburg, Germany
15:00 CEST	Kramarić 74'; Gjasula 76' (o.g.)	Report	Laçi 11'; Gjasula 90+5'	Stadium: Volksparkstadion; Attendance: 46,784; Referee: François Letexier (France)

24 June UEFA Euro 2024 Group B	Albania	0–1	Spain	Düsseldorf, Germany
21:00 CEST		Report	Torres 13'	Stadium: Merkur Spiel-Arena; Attendance: 46,586; Referee: Glenn Nyberg (Sweden)

7 September 2024–25 UEFA Nations League	Ukraine	1–2	Albania	Prague, Czech Republic (Note: Due to the Russian invasion of Ukraine, Ukraine are required to play their home matches at neutral venues until further notice.)
20:45	Konoplia 49'	Report	Ismajli 54'; Asani 66'	Stadium: Stadion Letná; Attendance: 15,500; Referee: Luis Godinho (Portugal)

10 September 2024–25 UEFA Nations League	Albania	0–1	Georgia	Tirana, Albania
20:45		Report	Kochorashvili 71'	Stadium: Arena Kombëtare; Attendance: 20,400; Referee: Erik Lambrechts (Belgium)

11 October 2024–25 UEFA Nations League	Czech Republic	2–0	Albania	Prague, Czech Republic
20:45	Chorý 3', 63'	Report		Stadium: Stadion Letná; Attendance: 17,823; Referee: Benoît Bastien (France)

14 October 2024–25 UEFA Nations League	Georgia	0–1	Albania	Tbilisi, Georgia
18:00 (20:00 UTC+4)		Report	Asllani 48'	Stadium: Mikheil Meskhi Stadium; Attendance: 19,981; Referee: Danny Makkelie (Netherlands)

16 November 2024–25 UEFA Nations League	Albania	0–0	Czech Republic	Tirana, Albania
20:45		Report		Stadium: Arena Kombëtare; Attendance: 20,800; Referee: Sandro Schärer (Switzerland)

19 November 2024–25 UEFA Nations League	Albania	1–2	Ukraine	Tirana, Albania
20:45	Bajrami 75' (pen.)	Report	Zinchenko 5'; Yaremchuk 10'	Stadium: Arena Kombëtare; Attendance: 20,547; Referee: João Pinheiro (Portugal)

=== 2025 ===
21 March 2026 FIFA World Cup qualification	England	2–0	Albania	London, England
20:45	Lewis-Skelly 20'; Kane 77'	Report		Stadium: Wembley Stadium; Attendance: 82,378; Referee: Alejandro Hernández Hernández (Spain)

24 March 2026 FIFA World Cup qualification	Albania	3–0	Andorra	Tirana, Albania
20:45	Manaj 9', 19'; Uzuni 90+2'	Report		Stadium: Arena Kombëtare; Attendance: 17,183; Referee: Sebastian Gishamer (Austria)

7 June 2026 FIFA World Cup qualification	Albania	0–0	Serbia	Tirana, Albania
20:45		Report		Stadium: Arena Kombëtare; Attendance: 20,427; Referee: Davide Massa (Italy)

10 June 2026 FIFA World Cup qualification	Latvia	1–1	Albania	Riga, Latvia
20:45	Černomordijs 45+4'	Report	Černomordijs 29' (o.g.)	Stadium: Skonto Stadium; Attendance: 6,083; Referee: Halil Umut Meler (Turkey)

4 September Friendly	Gibraltar	0–1	Albania	Europa Point, Gibraltar
18:00		Report	Asani 69' (pen.)	Stadium: Europa Sports Park; Attendance: 2,000; Referee: Aaron Wyn Jones (Wales)

9 September 2026 FIFA World Cup qualification	Albania	1–0	Latvia	Tirana, Albania
20:45	Asllani 25' (pen.)	Report		Stadium: Arena Kombëtare; Attendance: 16,568; Referee: Damian Sylwestrzak (Poland)

11 October 2026 FIFA World Cup qualification	Serbia	0–1	Albania	Leskovac, Serbia
20:45		Report	Manaj 45+1'	Stadium: Dubočica Stadium; Attendance: 4,320; Referee: István Kovács (Romania)

14 October Friendly	Albania	4–2	Jordan	Tirana, Albania
19:00	Abualnadi 40' (o.g.); Broja 65'; Hoxha 75'; Bajrami 79'	Report	Al-Rashdan 27'; Olwan 90'	Stadium: Arena Kombëtare; Attendance: 9,265; Referee: Lukas Fähndrich (Switzerland)

13 November 2026 FIFA World Cup qualification	Andorra	0–1	Albania	Encamp, Andorra
20:45		Report	Asllani 67'	Stadium: Estadi de la FAF; Attendance: 2,225; Referee: Horațiu Feșnic (Romania)

16 November 2026 FIFA World Cup qualification	Albania	0–2	England	Tirana, Albania
18:00		Report	Kane 74', 82'	Stadium: Arena Kombëtare; Attendance: 21,459; Referee: Marco Guida (Italy)

=== 2026 ===
26 March 2026 FIFA World Cup qualification play-offs	Poland	2–1	Albania	Warsaw, Poland
20:45 UTC+1	Lewandowski 63'; Zieliński 73'	Report	Hoxha 42'	Stadium: Stadion Narodowy; Attendance: 56,412; Referee: Anthony Taylor (England)

31 March Friendly	Ukraine	1–0	Albania	Valencia, Spain
20:45	Hutsulyak 46'	Report		Stadium: Estadio Ciutat de València; Attendance: 7,100; Referee: Juan Martínez Munuera (Spain)

3 June Friendly	Albania	0–1	Israel	Tirana, Albania
20:00		Report	Gloukh 73'	Stadium: Arena Kombëtare; Attendance: 6,600; Referee: Miloš Savović (Montenegro)

6 June Friendly	Albania	0–1	Luxembourg	Tirana, Albania
20:00 UTC+2		Report	Sinani 8'	Stadium: Arena Kombëtare; Attendance: 5,142; Referee: Genc Nuza (Kosovo)

26 September 2026–27 UEFA Nations League	Albania	2–0	Belarus	Tirana, Albania
20:45	Asllani 34' (pen.); Muçi 45+2'	Report		Stadium: Arena Kombëtare; Attendance: 18,150; Referee: Sam Barrott (England)

29 September 2026–27 UEFA Nations League	San Marino	0–3	Albania	Serravalle, San Marino
20:45		Report	Mehmeti 21'; Uzuni 27'; Manaj 65'	Stadium: San Marino Stadium; Attendance: 3,402; Referee: Mihály Káprály (Hungary)

3 October 2026–27 UEFA Nations League	Finland	2–1	Albania	Helsinki, Finland
15:00 (16:00 UTC+3)	Walta 26', 71'	Report	Manaj 4'	Stadium: Helsinki Olympic Stadium; Attendance: 24,885; Referee: Rob Hennessy (Ireland)

6 October 2026–27 UEFA Nations League	Albania	2–1	San Marino	Tirana, Albania
20:45	Asllani 11', 90+3' (pen.)	Report	Lazzari 66'	Stadium: Arena Kombëtare; Attendance: 16,240; Referee: Mehmet Türkmen (Turkey)

12 November 2026–27 UEFA Nations League	Albania	2–0	Finland	Tirana, Albania
20:45	Muçi 35'; Manaj 50'	Report		Stadium: Arena Kombëtare; Attendance: 20,942; Referee: João Pinheiro (Portugal)

15 November 2026–27 UEFA Nations League	Belarus	0–2	Albania	Budapest, Hungary (Note: Due to Belarusian involvement in the Russian invasion of Ukraine, Belarus are required to play their home matches at neutral venues, and behind closed doors, until further notice.)
18:00 (20:00 UTC+3)		Report	Manaj 28'; Hysaj 57'	Stadium: Illovszky Rudolf Stadion; Attendance: 0 Referee: Igor Pajač (Croatia)
