= Afrim Tovërlani =

Kosovar footballer and coach (born 1967)

Personal information
- Date of birth: 17 January 1967 (age 59)
- Place of birth: Pristina, SFR Yugoslavia
- Height: 1.71 m (5 ft 7 in)
- Position: Midfielder

Team information
- Current team: Prishtina (manager)

Senior career*
Years	Team	Apps	(Gls)
1979–1991	Prishtina	28	(0)
1992–1993	Flamurtari		
1993–2003	Prishtina		

International career
1993	Kosovo	1	(0)

Managerial career
- 2007–2009: Prishtina
- 2009–2010: Trepça '89
- 2012–2014: Prishtina
- 2015: Trepça '89
- 2015–2017: Feronikeli
- 2018–2019: Ferizaj
- 2020: Feronikeli
- 2022–2025: Kosovo U21
- 2023: Kosovo (assistant)
- 2025–2026: Prishtina
- * Club domestic league appearances and goals

Afrim Tovërlani (Serbian: Afrim Tovarlani; born 17 January 1967) is a Kosovar Albanian football coach and a former football player. He last managed FC Prishtina.

Tovërlani has also worked as a sports editor for the Kosovar daily newspaper Express.

== Early life ==
Afrim Toverlani born and raised in Pristina, where he attended elementary school, high school, then he attended the University of Prishtina and earned a degree in Physical Education and Sports.

== Playing career ==
=== Club ===
Afrim Tovërlani established himself as a prominent footballer in Kosovo while playing for Prishtina, where he had a noteworthy career. He made seven appearances in the Yugoslav First League for the club.

=== International ===
On 1 February 1993, Tovërlani received a call-up from Kosovo for a friendly match against Albania, and made his debut after being named in the starting line-up.

== Managerial career ==
In his career as a coach in the Football Superleague of Kosovo, Tovërlani won 4 league titles and two national cups. From 2022 to 2025, he managed the Kosovo national under-21 football team. He resigned from that position to return to club football after more than five years after his last job at KF Feronikeli, being appointed FC Prishtina manager for the third time in his career on 25 November 2025. He left the club on 17 March 2026 after a poor run of results.

== Honours ==
=== Manager ===
FC Prishtina

- Kosovar League: 2007–08, 2008–09, 2012–13
- Kosovar Cup: 2012-14

KF Feronikeli

- Kosovar League: 2015–16
- Kosovar Cup: 2014-15
