= Jurgen Peqini =

Albanian footballer

Personal information
- Date of birth: 24 August 1998 (age 28)
- Place of birth: Elbasan, Albania
- Position: Striker

Team information
- Current team: Pogradeci
- Number: 7

Youth career
- 2012–2015: Elbasani

Senior career*
Years	Team	Apps	(Gls)
2015–2017	Elbasani	13	(4)
2017–2019	Teuta	6	(3)
2019	→ Erzeni (loan)	10	(1)
2019–2020	Turbina	25	(9)
2020–2021	Besa Kavajë	14	(4)
2021–2022	Erzeni	4	(0)
2022	Tërbuni Pukë	15	(2)
2023–2024	Elbasani		
2024	Phoenix Banjë		
2024–	Pogradeci	4	(0)

International career
2015	Albania U19	0	(0)
- * Club domestic league appearances and goals as of 27 September 2019

Jurgen Peqini (born 24 August 1998), is an Albanian professional footballer who plays midfielder for Albanian club Turbina Cërrik in the Albanian First Division.

== Club career ==
=== Early career ===
Peqini started his youth career at 14 with KF Elbasani in September 2012. During the 2013–14 season he played with an under-17 side and made 22 appearances. In the 2015–16 season he appeared for the under-19 side playing 14 matches and scoring 2 goals and also he gained entry with the first team.

=== Elbasani ===
Peqini participated for the first time with the first team of Elbasani in the 2015–16 Albanian First Division 3rd game week against Turbina Cerrik on 26 September 2015, where however he was an unused substitute. Four days later he managed to make his professional debut and to score his first goal against Kamza in a match valid for the 2015–16 Albanian Cup first round. Peqini started the match on the bench, came in as a substitute in the 55th minute in place of Andi Mahilaj and scored in the 72nd minute to give his team the 1–1 home draw. On 24 October 2015 he made it his first Albanian First Division debut against Dinamo Tirana coming on as a substitute in the 71st minute in place of Andi Mahilaj in a 0–1 loss.

== International career ==
He was called up for the first time at international level in the Albania national under-19 football team by coach Arjan Bellaj for two friendly matches against Kosovo U19 on 13 & 15 October 2015.

== Career statistics ==
=== Club ===
As of 24 October 2015

Season	Club	League country	League		League Cup		Europe		Total	
Season	Club	League country	Apps	Goals	Apps	Goals	Apps	Goals	Apps	Goals
2015–16	Elbasani	Albanian First Division	1	0	1	1	-	-	2	1
Total			1	0	1	1	0	0	2	1
Career total			1	0	1	1	0	0	2	1

== Personal life ==
Peqini hails from a footballing family with his father, Kastriot Peqini earning 11 caps with the national team and his grandfather Sabri Peqini played for Dinamo Tirana.
