= Edmond Dosti =

Albanian footballer (born 1969)

Personal information
- Date of birth: 5 February 1969 (age 57)
- Place of birth: Tirana, PR Albania
- Position: Striker

Youth career
- –1983: Partizani

Senior career*
Years	Team	Apps	(Gls)
1983–1988	Partizani		
1988–1989	Laçi	32	(36)
1989–1990	Kastrioti		(14)
1990–1994	Partizani	67	(45)
1994	Jadran Poreč		
1994–1995	Olimpija Ljubljana	22	(18)
1995–1996	Vorwärts Steyr		
1996–1997	Olimpija Ljubljana	25	(12)
1997–2002	Eisenstadt	80	(69)
2002–2003	Opel Rüsselsheim	52	(42)
2003–2004	Sollenau	60	(45)
2004–2006	Köttmannsdorf	36	(29)

International career
1991–1995	Albania	6	(0)
- * Club domestic league appearances and goals

Edmond Dosti (born 5 February 1969) is an Albanian former professional footballer who played as a striker.

== Club career ==
Dosti played as a striker for Partizani Tirana in Albania and also Olimpija Ljubljana in Slovenia. He was the Albanian Superliga top goalscorer for the 1992–93 season with 21 goals; that season he also won a league title with Partizani Tirana, playing alongside fellow international players Adnan Ocelli and Artan Bano.

== International career ==
Dosti was a member of the Albania national team from 1991 to 1995. In total he made four appearances for Albania, all of them were as a substitute.

== Personal life ==
Dosti lives in Graz city of Austria and he is manager of "Bar Austria" in Tirana with his brother Vladimir Dosti a football players manager.

== Honours ==
Partizani

- Albanian Superliga: 1992–93

Olimpija Ljubljana

- Slovenian PrvaLiga: 1994–95

== External sources ==
- Edmond Dosti at National-Football-Teams.com
- Profile at Playerhistory.com
