= 2008–09 Football Superleague of Kosovo =

Raiffeisen Superliga
- Season: 2008–09
- Champions: Prishtina; 12th Kosovan title
- Relegated: Trepça'89; Ulpiana; Istogu; 2 Korriku; Besiana; Drita
- Goals scored: 670
- Average goals/game: 2.79
- Top goalscorer: TBA
- Biggest home win: Hysi 6–0 Trepça; Drita 6–0 Besiana; Besa Pejë 6–0 Besiana
- Biggest away win: Besiana 0–5 Trepça'89
- Highest scoring: Ferizaj 7–2 Flamurtari

2008–09 Raiffeisen Superliga was the 10th (Note: This season was the 10th season under the name Football Superleague of Kosovo, the 16th season of top-tier football in Kosovo and the 62nd season of football in Kosovo overall.) season of top-tier football in Kosovo. It was scheduled to begin on 30 August 2008. The season ended with the 30th round played on 20 June 2009. Prishtina were the defending champions.

== Promotion and relegation ==
KF Fushë Kosova (after relegation play-offs), Shqiponja and KEK were relegated at the end of Raiffeisen Superliga 2007–08 due to finishing 14th through 16th, respectively. Istogu, Ferizaj and Ulpiana were promoted at the end of Liga e Parë 2007–08 due to finishing 1st through 3rd, respectively.

== Teams ==
Sixteen teams of Football Superleague of Kosovo season 2008–09 and their position at the end of the season:

Locations of the 2008–09 Football Superleague of Kosovo teams

| Team | Club home city | 2007–08 Season | Stadium | Stadium capacity |
|---|---|---|---|---|
| KF Besa Pejë | Peć | 3rd | Shahin Haxhiislami Stadium | 8,500 |
| KF Besiana | Podujevo | 13th | City Stadium | 3,000 |
| KF Drenica | Skenderaj | 10th | Bajram Aliu Stadium | 3,000 |
| FC Drita | Gjilan | 12th | Gjilan City Stadium (Note: Drita and Gjilan use this stadium together and have named the stadium with different names. Drita and their fans named the stadium as Selami Osmani-Bezi Stadium, while Gjilan and their fans named the stadium as Agim Ramadani Stadium, but officially the stadium is named Gjilan City Stadium.) | 10,000 |
| KF Flamurtari | Pristina | 6th | Flamurtari Stadium | 2,500 |
| KF Ferizaj | Ferizaj | Liga e Parë, 2nd | Ismet Shabani Stadium | 5,000 |
| SC Gjilani | Gjilan | 4th | Gjilan City | 10,000 |
| KF Hysi | Podujevo | 5th | Merdarë Stadium | 2,000 |
| KF Istogu | Istok | Liga e Parë, 1st | Istogu Stadium | 6,000 |
| KF 2 Korriku | Pristina | 7th | Stadiumi 2 Korriku | Unknown |
| KF Kosova Vushtrri | Vučitrn | 8th | Ferki Aliu Studium | 5,000 |
| FC Prishtina | Pristina | 1st | Fadil Vokrri Stadium | 25,000 |
| KF Trepça | Mitrovica | 9th | Adem Jashari Olympic Stadium | 29,000 |
| KF Trepça'89 | Mitrovica | 11th | Riza Lushta | 7,000 |
| KF Ulpiana | Lipjan | Liga e Parë, 3rd | Lipjani Stadium | Unknown |
| KF Vëllaznimi | Gjakova | 2nd | City Stadium | 6.000 |

== League table ==
| Pos | Team | Pld | W | D | L | GF | GA | GD | Pts | Relegation |
|---|---|---|---|---|---|---|---|---|---|---|
| 1 | Prishtina (C) | 30 | 16 | 9 | 5 | 46 | 25 | +21 | 57 | |
| 2 | Besa | 30 | 14 | 8 | 8 | 43 | 31 | +12 | 50 | |
| 3 | Vëllaznimi | 30 | 13 | 10 | 7 | 43 | 30 | +13 | 49 | |
| 4 | Trepça | 30 | 14 | 7 | 9 | 46 | 44 | +2 | 49 | |
| 5 | Kosova Vushtrri | 30 | 13 | 9 | 8 | 42 | 30 | +12 | 48 | |
| 6 | Gjilani | 30 | 14 | 5 | 11 | 40 | 32 | +8 | 47 | |
| 7 | Hysi | 30 | 13 | 7 | 10 | 53 | 35 | +18 | 46 | |
| 8 | Ferizaj | 30 | 14 | 4 | 12 | 56 | 51 | +5 | 46 | |
| 9 | Flamurtari | 30 | 14 | 4 | 12 | 45 | 45 | 0 | 46 | |
| 10 | Drenica | 30 | 13 | 6 | 11 | 49 | 39 | +10 | 45 | |
| 11 | Trepça'89 (R) | 30 | 11 | 9 | 10 | 36 | 31 | +5 | 42 | Relegation to 2009–10 Liga e Parë |
| 12 | Ulpiana (R) | 30 | 11 | 3 | 16 | 35 | 47 | −12 | 36 | Relegation to 2009–10 Liga e Parë |
| 13 | Istogu (R) | 30 | 9 | 5 | 16 | 38 | 53 | −15 | 32 | Relegation to 2009–10 Liga e Parë |
| 14 | 2 Korriku (R) | 30 | 8 | 5 | 17 | 38 | 56 | −18 | 29 | Relegation to 2009–10 Liga e Parë |
| 15 | Besiana (R) | 30 | 8 | 2 | 20 | 26 | 69 | −43 | 26 | Relegation to 2009–10 Liga e Parë |
| 16 | Drita (R) | 30 | 6 | 5 | 19 | 34 | 52 | −18 | 23 | Relegation to 2009–10 Liga e Parë |

(C) Champions; (R) Relegated

== Results ==
| Home \ Away | KOR | BES | BSN | DRE | DRI | FRZ | FLA | GJI | HYS | IST | VUS | PRI | TRE | T89 | ULP | VLZ |
|---|---|---|---|---|---|---|---|---|---|---|---|---|---|---|---|---|
| 2 Korriku | | 0–0 | 2–3 | 0–2 | 2–1 | 3–4 | 2–3 | 2–1 | 3–2 | 5–3 | 0–0 | 0–1 | 1–2 | 1–0 | 1–0 | 1–0 |
| Besa | 1–1 | | 6–0 | 0–2 | 3–2 | 4–1 | 4–0 | 1–0 | 0–0 | 2–1 | 1–0 | 1–0 | 2–1 | 0–0 | 3–1 | 2–1 |
| Besiana | 2–1 | 2–0 | | 1–1 | 2–0 | 2–0 | 0–3 | 2–1 | 1–4 | 2–1 | 1–0 | 1–3 | 1–2 | 0–5 | 2–2 | 1–2 |
| Drenica | 1–1 | 2–3 | 2–0 | | 2–1 | 3–3 | 2–0 | 3–0 | 4–0 | 2–1 | 4–2 | 3–2 | 3–3 | 1–2 | 3–0 | 0–0 |
| Drita | 1–2 | 2–2 | 6–0 | 1–0 | | 2–0 | 1–0 | 1–3 | 3–5 | 3–1 | 0–1 | 0–2 | 0–0 | 0–0 | 1–0 | 0–1 |
| Ferizaj | 3–2 | 3–0 | 3–1 | 2–1 | 5–1 | | 7–2 | 2–0 | 1–0 | 2–0 | 1–0 | 1–2 | 2–1 | 1–1 | 4–2 | 1–1 |
| Flamurtari | 2–1 | 1–2 | 2–0 | 1–0 | 3–1 | 1–0 | | 1–3 | 2–1 | 2–1 | 0–0 | 0–0 | 2–1 | 0–1 | 5–0 | 2–0 |
| Gjilani | 2–0 | 1–0 | 2–0 | 2–1 | 2–1 | 1–0 | 1–2 | | 1–0 | 3–0 | 1–0 | 0–1 | 3–0 | 1–0 | 1–1 | 0–0 |
| Hysi | 2–0 | 2–2 | 3–1 | 4–1 | 2–2 | 5–2 | 3–1 | 2–1 | | 4–0 | 0–3 | 0–1 | 6–0 | 2–1 | 1–0 | 2–2 |
| Istogu | 6–3 | 1–0 | 2–0 | 1–0 | 2–0 | 2–3 | 1–3 | 2–2 | 0–0 | | 2–1 | 1–0 | 1–0 | 0–0 | 3–1 | 2–2 |
| Kosova Vushtrri | 2–2 | 1–1 | 3–0 | 1–0 | 0–0 | 4–1 | 1–1 | 3–1 | 1–0 | 3–1 | | 0–0 | 4–3 | 1–1 | 1–0 | 3–1 |
| Prishtina | 3–0 | 2–0 | 3–1 | 1–3 | 3–0 | 0–0 | 3–2 | 2–2 | 0–0 | 0–0 | 2–0 | | 2–1 | 3–1 | 4–1 | 2–2 |
| Trepça | 3–2 | 1–1 | 1–0 | 0–0 | 5–3 | 2–1 | 1–1 | 2–1 | 1–0 | 3–1 | 0–0 | 3–0 | | 1–0 | 2–1 | 1–1 |
| Trepça'89 | 1–0 | 2–1 | 2–0 | 1–2 | 1–0 | 3–1 | 2–1 | 2–2 | 0–3 | 1–0 | 1–2 | 1–1 | 3–5 | | 3–0 | 0–0 |
| Ulpiana | 1–0 | 0–1 | 5–0 | 2–0 | 2–1 | 2–1 | 1–0 | 0–2 | 1–0 | 2–0 | 4–5 | 1–1 | 0–1 | 1–0 | | 2–1 |
| Vëllaznimi | 4–0 | 1–0 | 2–0 | 4–1 | 1–0 | 3–1 | 5–2 | 1–0 | 0–0 | 4–2 | 1–0 | 0–2 | 2–0 | 1–1 | 0–2 | |

Legend: Blue = home team win; Yellow = draw; Red = away team win.
