= Ilir Shulku =

Albanian footballer

Personal information
- Date of birth: 21 January 1969 (age 57)
- Place of birth: Tirana, Albania
- Position: Defender

Senior career*
Years	Team	Apps	(Gls)
1988–1997	Partizani	163	(14)
1997	Apollon Athens	1	(0)
1997–1999	Partizani	5	(0)
1999–2000	Eintracht Nordhorn	44	(2)
2000–2002	Partizani	23	(4)

International career
1990–1999	Albania	40	(1)

Managerial career
- 2004: Partizani
- 2005–2006: Besa
- * Club domestic league appearances and goals

Ilir Shulku (born 21 January 1969) is an Albanian retired professional footballer, who played the majority of his career for Partizani Tirana.

== Club career ==
Shulku had a three-month spell with Apollon Athens in the Greek Alpha Ethniki and played one and a half season for German Regionalliga side Eintracht Nordhorn.

== International career ==
Shulku made his debut for the Albania national team in a February 1993 FIFA World Cup qualification match against Northern Ireland and earned a total of 40 caps, scoring one goal. His final international was an October 1999 European Championship qualification match against Georgia.

== Personal life ==
Shulku is married to Evis and they have two children. He has been general secretary of the Albanian FA since November 2012.

== Career statistics ==
Appearances and goals by national team and year
National team	Year	Apps	Goals
Albania	1993	7	0
Albania	1994	4	0
Albania	1995	7	0
Albania	1996	2	0
Albania	1997	6	0
Albania	1998	8	1
Albania	1999	6	0
Total		40	1

== Honours ==
Partizani

- Albanian Superliga: 1993
