= Genc Hoxha =

Kosovar former footballer and manager

Personal information
- Full name: Genc Hoxha
- Date of birth: 15 September 1957 (age 69)
- Place of birth: Gjakova, FPR Yugoslavia

Youth career
- Gjakova

Senior career*
Years	Team	Apps	(Gls)
–1978	Vëllaznimi		
1978–1979	Liria	19	(0)
1980–1981	Vëllaznimi	14	(0)
1981–1984	Trepça	66	(12)
1984–1994	Vëllaznimi	51+	(11+)

International career
1993	Kosovo	1	(0)

Managerial career
- 2005–2007: Besa Pejë
- 2011: Hysi
- 2014–2015: Vëllaznimi
- 2015–2016: Istogu
- * Club domestic league appearances and goals

Genc Hoxha (born 15 September 1957) is a Kosovan professional football coach and former player.

== Playing career ==
Hoxha was part of the local club KF Gjakova before starting his professional career with Vëllaznimi. He later played for Liria and Trepça before ending his career at Vëllaznimi.

=== International ===
On 1 February 1993, Hoxha received a call-up from Kosovo for a friendly match against Albania, and made his debut after being named in the starting line-up and scored his side's only goal during a 3–1 away defeat.

== Honours ==
=== Manager ===
Besa Pejë

- Kosovo Superleague: 2005–06, 2006–07
