= Isa Sadriu =

Kosovan Albanian footballer (born 1963)

Personal information
- Date of birth: 27 December 1963 (age 62)
- Place of birth: Vučitrn, SR Serbia, SFR Yugoslavia (present-day Kosovo)
- Positions: Midfielder; defender

Youth career
- –1979: Vushtrria

Senior career*
| Years | Team | Apps | (Gls) |
| 1981–1985 | Trepça | 111 | (3) |
| 1986–1987 | Partizan | 22 | (0) |
| 1987–1992 | Prishtina | 70 | (1) |
| 1992–1993 | Malmö FF | 0 | (0) |
| 1994–1998 | Hertha Zehlendorf | 93 | (5) |
| 1998–1999 | Croatia Berlin | 28 | (0) |
| Total | | 324 | (9) |

International career
| 1993 | Kosovo XI | 1 | (0) |
- * Club domestic league appearances and goals

Isa Sadriu (born 27 December 1963) is a Kosovo-Albanian retired footballer who played as a midfielder or defender.

== Club career ==
Sadriu started his career with the local club Vushtrria where he played until 1981 and then transferred to KF Trepça. After playing with Trepça in the Yugoslav Second League since 1981, his talent was spotted by FK Partizan who brought him to their team during the winter break of the 1985–86 Yugoslav First League season. He played a total of 72 matches for Partizan, 22 of which were league ones. He left the following summer having won two national championships during his 18 months in Belgrade and joined FC Prishtina which was at that time the only topflight club from SAP Kosovo. He made one appearance for Pristina at 1991–92 Yugoslav Second League. He will later play in German Regionalliga clubs during the late 1990s.

== International career ==
On 1 February 1993, Sadriu received a call-up from Kosovo for a friendly match against Albania, and made his debut after being named in the starting line-up.

== Managerial career ==
In 2013, Sadriu, along with Gazmend Haliti, became the coach of the Kosovo U-15 team.

== Honours ==
Partizan

- Yugoslav First League: 1985–86, 1986–87
