= Zyber Lisi =

Albanian footballer

Personal information
- Full name: Zyber Fagu
- Date of birth: 1 January 1919
- Place of birth: Tirana, Albania
- Position: Centre forward

Youth career
- –1937: Sportklub Tirana

Senior career*
Years	Team	Apps	(Gls)
1937–1947	SK Tirana		
1947–1954	Partizani Tirana		
- * Club domestic league appearances and goals

Zyber Lisi (born 1 January 1919) is an Albanian former football player who played for both SK Tirana and Partizani Tirana between 1937 and 1954. He was considered to be one of the best forwards in Albania following the departure of Riza Lushta to Bari in Italy.

== Club career ==
=== SK Tirana ===
Lisi was born in Tirana and made his professional debut against Ismail Qemali Vlorë on 2 May 1937 in the second week of the 1937 National Championship. As an 18-year-old he started up front alongside Riza Lushta, who opened the scoring in the 20th minute before Lisi scored on his debut to double Tirana's lead in the 40th minute in a game which ended 2–0. His next goal for the club would come on 6 June in an emphatic 11–0 win over Bardhyli Lezhë, where Lushta netted 6 times in the opening 51 minutes, with Lisi's only goal of the game coming in the 35th minute. In his debut season, he managed to score 10 goals to help the club retain the national championship with 17 wins, 1 draw, and no losses.

He also scored in the first King's Cup final against Vllaznia Shkodër in a game which ended in a 2–1 win for Tirana to crown them the inaugural King's Cup winners. Following the Italian invasion of Albania in 1939, some senior Tirana players including Riza Lushta and Naim Kryeziu left the country, meaning Haki Korça had to replace Lushta up front and play alongside Lisi.

== Honours ==
- Albanian Superliga: 3

1937, 1947, 1948,
