= Muharrem Sahiti =

Kosovan football coach (born 1965)

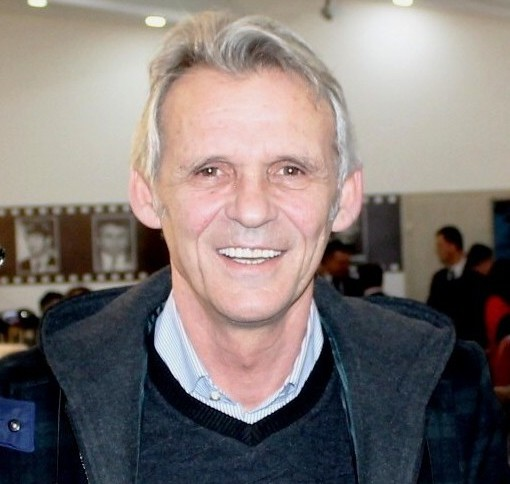
- Muharrem Sahiti, 2018

Personal information
- Full name: Muharrem Sahiti
- Date of birth: 10 May 1965 (age 61)
- Place of birth: Vitina, Yugoslavia
- Height: 1.79 m (5 ft 10 in)
- Position: Midfielder

Team information
- Current team: Kosovo (sports director)

Youth career
- 1982–1985: SC Gjilani

Senior career*
Years	Team	Apps	(Gls)
1985–1986	SC Gjilani	32	(12)
1986–1990	Prishtina	43	(13)
1990–1992	Konyaspor	48	(2)
1992–1997	Lokomotiv Plovdiv		
1997–1998	Thun		
1998–1999	Oberneuland		
1999–2002	Gjilani		
Total		123	(27)

International career
1993	Kosovo	1	(0)

Managerial career
- 2002–2004: Gjilani
- 2004–2005: Drita
- 2005–2006: Kosovo
- 2007–2009: Gjilani
- 2009–2017: Kosovo (assistant)
- 2017–2018: Kosovo (caretaker)
- 2018–2021: Kosovo (assistant)
- 2020: Kosovo (caretaker)
- 2021–: Kosovo (sports director)
- * Club domestic league appearances and goals

Muharrem Sahiti (born 10 May 1965) is a Kosovan professional football coach and former player who is currently the sports director of the Kosovo national team.

Sahiti played as a midfielder during his professional careerand began his youth career with Crvena Zvezda Gjilane and later represented the club at senior level, making 32 appearances and scoring 12 goals between 1985 and 1986. He subsequently played for Prishtina before moving abroad to play for Konyaspor, Lokomotiv Plovdiv, Thun and Oberneuland, before returning to Gjilani to conclude his playing career. At international level, Sahiti made one appearance for Kosovo in 1993.

After retiring as a player, he began his coaching career with Gjilani and later managed Drita. He then joined the Kosovo national team in various coaching roles, serving as assistant coach, caretaker manager on multiple occasions, and later being appointed sports director in 2021, a position he currently holds.

== Club career ==
Sahiti began his playing career at the age of 17 for Crvena Zvezda Gjilane. After three years, he was promoted to the senior team and appeared 32 times, scoring 12 goals. A year later, he was transferred to the Yugoslav First League club Prishtina.

After the political situation in Kosovo deteriorated in 1990, he was transferred to Süper Lig club Konyaspor where he played for two seasons and appeared 48 times, scoring 2 goals. He also played for Lokomotiv Plovdiv (1992–1997), Thun (1997–1998) and Oberneuland (1998–1999). During the last three years of his career he returned to his former team, Gjilani and in the 1999–2000 season won the Cup and the Supercup.

== International career ==
On 1 February 1993, Sahiti received a call-up from Kosovo for a friendly match against Albania, and made his debut after being named in the starting line-up.

== Managerial career ==
=== Kosovo ===
==== Second term as caretaker ====
On 1 November 2017, The Football Federation of Kosovo appointed Sahiti as caretaker manager. On 8 November 2017, he made his first squad announcement with Kosovo for the friendly match against Latvia and he brought three new players as Armend Thaqi, Faton Maloku and Suad Sahiti. On 13 November 2017, he made his first match as Kosovo manager with a 4–3 home win against Latvia.

== Career statistics ==
=== Managerial ===
As of 18 November 2020

Team	As	From	To	Record				
Team	As	From	To	G	W	D	L	Win %
Kosovo	Manager	2005	2006	3	2	0	1	66.67
Kosovo	Caretaker	1 November 2017	2 March 2018	1	1	0	0	100.00
Kosovo	Caretaker	11 November 2020	18 November 2020	3	1	0	2	33.33
Total				7	4	0	3	57.14

== Notes and references ==
=== Notes ===
1. On 11 November 2020, Bernard Challandes was tested positive with COVID-19 and Sahiti was named as his replacement for the November 2020 matches.
