= Kushtrim Munishi =

Kosovar footballer and coach (born 1973)

Personal information
- Full name: Kushtrim Munishi
- Date of birth: 17 March 1973 (age 53)
- Place of birth: Pristina, SFR Yugoslavia
- Height: 1.74 m (5 ft 9 in)
- Position: Forward

Team information
- Current team: Kosovo W U19 (manager); Kosovo W U17 (manager)

Senior career*
Years	Team	Apps	(Gls)
1990–1992	Prishtina	6	(1)
1993	Zagłębie Lubin	11	(0)
1993/94	Prishtina		(11)
1994	DSV Leoben		
1995	Lokomotiv Plovdiv	1	(1)
1995	Prishtina		(7)
1996–1997	Partizani Tirana	7	(1)
1997–1998	DSV Leoben		
1999–2000	Prishtina	25	(11)
2000–2003	Besiana	84	(71)
2003–2004	Kosova Prishtinë	33	(21)
2004–2005	Flamurtari	24	(9)
2005	KEK	11	(4)
2006	Gjilani	15	(14)
2006–2007	Hysi	29	(23)
2007–2008	Prishtina	24	(16)
Total		271	(215)

International career
1993	Kosovo	1	(1)

Managerial career
- 2008–2016: Prishtina (youth)
- 2016: Prishtina
- 2017–: Kosovo U19 (women's)
- 2021–: Kosovo U17 (women's)
- * Club domestic league appearances and goals

Kushtrim Munishi (born 17 March 1973) is a Kosovan–Albanian professional football manager and former player who is currently in charge of women's Kosovo U19 and U17 teams.

== Playing career ==
=== Club ===
Kushtrim Munishi started his career in 1990 making his first appearance for FC Prishtina at the age of 17. He made 5 appearances and scored one goal in 1990–91 Yugoslav Second League and one appearance in 1991–92 Yugoslav Second League.

In 1993, he joined Zagłębie Lubin from Poland. From 1993 to 1999, he played for DSV Leoben (and for a brief time in autumn 1997 for ASKOe Gurnitz in Carinthia, both in Austria), Lokomotiv Plovdiv in Bulgaria and Partizani in Albania.

After the end of the war in Kosovo he returned playing initially for FC Prishtina and then for Besiana, KF Kosova (P), Flamurtari, Gjilani and Hysi. In his last season he played for FC Prishtina, and was a crucial player in winning the Champion of Kosovo title.

While playing overseas he was put in the position of midfielder, which was not his natural role; in Kosovo he was a striker.

After 2000, while playing in Kosovo, he was awarded as Best Soccer Player in Kosovo and Best Sportsman and won Best Goal Scoring Award three times.

He retired in 2008 and currently he is the head coach of Kosovo's female national squad in the U-19 and U-16 category.

=== International ===
On 1 February 1993, Munishi received a call-up from Kosovo for a friendly match against Albania, and made his debut after being named in the starting line-up and scored his side's only goal during a 3–1 away defeat.

== Coaching career ==
After retiring from football, he attended UEFA Coaching License training and obtained a UEFA Pro License. Since 2000, he worked as a coach for Prishtina's youth teams and was the director of their football academy. In 2016, he was appointed manager of Prishtina's senior team, and won the Kosovar Supercup shortly after. He managed his team to six league victories and one draw, leading the Kosovo Superliga ranking. Following a disagreement on a professional basis and since he didn't want to work without a professional contract, he left the club.

Since February 2017, he has been in charge for Kosovo women's U19 and U17 teams. With the U16 generation he won an international tournament in Tallinn, Estonia which became the first ever UEFA tournament won by Kosovo.

== Career statistics ==
=== International ===
Appearances and goals by national team and year
National team	Year	Apps	Goals
Kosovo	1993	1	1
Total		1	1

Scores and results list Kosovo's goal tally first, score column indicates score after each Munishi goal.

List of international goals scored by Kushtrim Munishi
No.	Date	Venue	Cap	Opponent	Score	Result	Competition	Ref.
1.	14 February 1993	Selman Stërmasi Stadium, Tirana, Albania	1	Albania	1–3	1–3	Friendly	

== Honours ==
=== As a player ===
Prishtina

- Football Superleague of Kosovo: 1991–92, 1995–96, 1996/97, 1999–2000, 2007–08
- Kosovar Cup: 1993–94
- Kosovar Supercup 1994

Besiana

- Football Superleague of Kosovo: 2001–02
- Kosovar Cup: 2001–02
- Kosovar Supercup: 2002

Kosova Prishtinë

- Kosovar Cup: 2003–04

Individual

- Football Superleague of Kosovo top scorer: 2000–01, 2001–02, 2006–07
- Best football player of Kosovo announced by FFK(Football Federation of Kosovo)for the year 2001
- Best sportsman of the year 2001 by Koha Ditore newspaper
- Best sportsman of the year 2001 by Kosova Sport newspaper
- Second best football player of Kosovo announced by FFK(Football Federation of Kosovo)for the year 1999
- Third best football player of Kosovo announced by FFK for the year 2000 (Football Federation of Kosovo)

=== As a manager ===
Prishtina

- Kosovar Supercup: 2016

== External sources ==
- Kushtrim Munishi at 90minut.pl (in Polish)
