= Artan Bano =

Albanian footballer and manager

Personal information
- Date of birth: 17 February 1966 (age 60)
- Place of birth: Lushnja, Albania
- Position: Attacking midfielder

Team information
- Current team: Lushnja (manager)

Senior career*
Years	Team	Apps	(Gls)
1991–1993	Partizani		
1993–1994	Pazinka	13	(1)
1994–1995	Svoboda Ljubljana	6	(1)
1995–1997	Lushnja		
1997–1998	Pazinka		
1998–2002	Lushnja	85	(43)
2002–2003	Besa	2	(1)

International career
1993–1996	Albania	7	(0)

Managerial career
- 2006: Lushnja
- 2006–2008: Lushnja
- 2011: Tomori
- 2012: Skrapari
- 2012–2017: Lushnja
- 2018–2019: Shkumbini
- 2019–2020: Egnatia
- 2021: Shkumbini
- 2021–2022: Butrinti
- 2023: Besëlidhja
- 2026–: Lushnja
- * Club domestic league appearances and goals

Artan Bano (born 17 February 1966 in Lushnja) is a retired Albanian international football player, who currently is head coach at Albanian Second Division side Lushnja.

== International career ==
He made his debut for Albania in a February 1993 FIFA World Cup qualification match at home against Northern Ireland and earned a total of 7 caps, scoring no goals. His final international was an August 1996 friendly match against Greece.

== Honours ==
- Albanian Superliga: 1

1993
