= Adnan Oçelli =

Albanian footballer

Personal information
- Date of birth: 6 August 1963 (age 63)
- Place of birth: Albania
- Position: Left-back

Youth career
- Partizani Tirana

Senior career*
Years	Team	Apps	(Gls)
1984–1993	Partizani Tirana		
1993–1995	Zadar	54	(6)
1995–1996	Union Berlin	11	(2)
1996–1997	Orijent	14	(0)
1996	→ Suwon Bluewings (loan)	14	(1)
1997–1999	Hrvatski Dragovoljac	0	(0)

International career
1984–1993	Albania	12	(0)

Managerial career
- 2010–2012: Podgradina
- * Club domestic league appearances and goals

Adnan Oçelli (born 6 August 1963) is an Albanian former professional footballer who player as a left-back. He made 11 appearances for the Albania national team.

== Club career ==
Oçelli grew up at the KF Partizani football academy and defended its red colors for nine years, until he moved abroad and joined Croatian side NK Zadar in 1993. In 1995–96 he had a short spell with Union Berlin and he later played in South Korea and in Croatia again.

== International career ==
Oçelli made his debut for Albania in the famous December 1984 FIFA World Cup qualification win over Belgium and earned a total of 11 caps, scoring no goals. His final international was a June 1993 FIFA World Cup qualification match against Denmark.

== Player agent ==
Oçelli spent time as a coach with Croatian amateurs Podgradina and later became one of Albania's official FIFA player agents.

== Career statistics ==
=== International ===
Appearances and goals by national team and year
National team	Year	Apps	Goals
Albania	1984	1	0
Albania	1985	2	0
Albania	1986	1	0
Albania	1987	1	0
Albania	1988	–	
Albania	1989	–	
Albania	1990	–	
Albania	1991	3	0
Albania	1992	–	
Albania	1993	4	0
Total		12	0

== Honours ==
- Albanian Superliga: 1987, 1993

== External sources ==
- Adnan Oçelli – K League stats at kleague.com (in Korean and English)
- Adnan Oçelli at National-Football-Teams.com
- Adnan Oçelli at WorldFootball.net
