= Salvador Kaçaj =

Albanian footballer

Personal information
- Date of birth: 23 October 1967 (age 59)
- Place of birth: Lezhë, Albania
- Height: 1.86 m (6 ft 1 in)
- Position: Midfielder

Senior career*
Years	Team	Apps	(Gls)
1985–1990	Besëlidhja		
1990–1991	Skënderbeu		
1990–1991	Kalotheas		
1992–1994	Athinaikos		
1994–1995	Olympiakos Nicosia	28	(4)
1995–1997	Omonia Nicosia		
1997–1998	Levadiakos		
1998–2000	Vllaznia	11	(1)

International career
1991–1996	Albania	18	(1)
- * Club domestic league appearances and goals

Salvador Kaçaj (born 23 October 1967) is a retired Albanian footballer who played as a midfielder.

== Club career ==
Kaçaj began playing football in Albania with the club Besëlidhja Lezhë, and moved to Greece in 1991. After one season in the Greek third division with Kallithea F.C., he joined Athinaikos F.C. in the Greek first division for two seasons.

After three seasons in Cyprus with AC Omonia, he returned to Greece to play for Levadiakos in the Greek Beta Ethniki.

== International career ==
He made his debut for Albania in a September 1991 friendly match against Greece and earned a total of 18 caps, scoring 1 goal. His final international was a June 1997 FIFA World Cup qualification match away against Portugal.

== Post-football career ==
Kaçaj has a legal degree as well as a business degree that he earned by attending university in New York. He was presented with the title "Master of the sport" and decorated with "Gold Medal". Kaçaj is now married with four children. His nephew David Kaçaj played briefly for KF Tërbuni Pukë in the Kategoria Superiore.

In May 2011, Kaçaj was elected town mayor of Shëngjin, a small touristic coastal town situated in Lezhë District.
