= KF Besiana =

Football club in Kosovo

- Full name: Klub Futbollistik Besiana
- Founded: 1984; 41 years ago
- Dissolved: 2011
- Ground: Zahir Pajaziti City Stadium
- Capacity: 2,000
- President: Ertan Cihic
- Manager: Selatin Vokrri
- League: None
- 2010–11 (last): Kosovo First League, 16th of 16 (withdraw)
Home colours	Away colours

Klubi Futbollistik Besiana (KF Besiana) was a football club based in Podujevo (known in Albanian as Besiana), Kosovo. It was founded in 1984 and played in the second division of football in Kosovo, Liga e Parë. Legendary former Kosovo footballer Fadil Vokrri is one of founders of the club. KF Besiana won the Kosovar Superliga and the Kosovar Cup during the 2001/02 season.

== History ==
KF Besiana are one-time Champions of Kosovo, winning in 2002, and also won the Kosovar Cup and Kosovar Super Cup in the same season. The team colours are yellow and navy blue.

The city rivals were KF Hysi, who also are not active anymore, and KF Llapi, who play in the first division, Kosovo Superliga.

KF Besiana is the brother team of Turkish champion Fenerbahçe SK.

== Honours ==
- Champions of Kosovo: 1
  - 2001/02
- Kosovar Cup: 1
  - 2001/02
- Kosovar Super Cup: 1
  - 2001/02
