= Kastriot Peqini =

Albanian footballer

Personal information
- Full name: Kastriot Sabri Peqini
- Date of birth: 19 February 1974 (age 52)
- Place of birth: Elbasan, Albania
- Height: 1.79 m (5 ft 10 in)
- Position: Striker

Senior career*
Years	Team	Apps	(Gls)
1991–1993	Elbasani	47	(9)
1993–1995	Birkirkara	20	(4)
Total		67	(13)

International career
1989–1991	Albania U-21	5	(0)
1992–1993	Albania	11	(0)
- * Club domestic league appearances and goals as of 20 March 2015

Kastriot Sabri Peqini (born 19 February 1974) is a retired Albanian professional footballer who played for KF Elbasani in Albania and Birkirkara FC in Malta.

He became the second youngest player to play for the Albania national team when he made his debut on 29 January 1992 at the age of 17 years and 343 days old, just 12 days older than the youngest ever player Blendi Nallbani.

== International career ==
He made his debut for Albania in a January 1992 friendly match against Greece and earned a total of 11 caps, scoring no goals. His final international was a June 1993 FIFA World Cup qualification match against Denmark.

=== National team statistics ===
Albania national team
Year	Apps	Goals
1992	6	0
1993	5	0
Total	11	0

== Personal life ==
He is the son of former Albania international and Dinamo Tirana legend Sabri Peqini. His own son, Jurgen Peqini, is also a professional footballer.
