= FC Prishtina =

Association football club in Kosovo

Prishtina
- Full name: Football Club Prishtina
- Nickname: Plisat (The Clods)
- Short name: PRI, FCP
- Founded: 21 April 1922; 104 years ago (as KF Kosova Prishtinë); 15 July 1957; 69 years ago (as KF Prishtina)
- Ground: Fadil Vokrri Stadium
- Capacity: 13,980
- Owner(s): Rrahman Haradini (92%); Other owners (8%)
- President: Rrahman Haradini
- Manager: Orges Shehi
- League: Kosovo Superleague
- 2025–26: Kosovo Superleague, 7th of 10
- Website: prishtinafc.com
Home colours	Away colours

Football Club Prishtina (Albanian: Klubi Futbollistik Prishtina, IPA: [ˈklubi futboɫisˈtik ˈpɾiʃtina]), commonly known as Prishtina, is a professional football club based in Pristina, Kosovo. The club plays in the Kosovo Superleague. It is the most successful domestic club.

== History ==
The club was founded in 1922 under the name Kosovo. Later on their name changed to Proleter, Bashkimi, Kosova and finally Prishtina.

=== 1922–1926: Beginnings of FC Prishtina (Football Club Kosovo) ===
Football began to be played and developed in Kosovo shortly after the end of the First World War, around 1919. Many demobilized Serbian soldiers, officers, and students returning from universities in France, Switzerland, Italy, Austria, England, Budapest, and elsewhere brought with them an interest in the sport. One student from Samerslen College in Grenoble (France) is recorded as having brought the first football to Prishtina in 1919, a gift he had received from a doctor he had met there.

With the introduction of the first football in Prishtina, many young people began playing informally, though no organized structure existed at the time. Only friendly matches were played, primarily between school youth and the local military garrison.

As time passed, the need for a formally organized club grew stronger. In 1922, when Prishtina was a small town of roughly 16,000 inhabitants, local high school students took the initiative to form the first organized football club, named Kosovo. Although the club did not participate in official competitions due to not being registered with any sporting authority, it regularly played friendly matches. The team was composed mainly of high school students and was occasionally reinforced by soldiers from the Priština Garrison of the Yugoslav Royal Army.

These friendly matches were commonly played against other newly formed teams both within Kosovo and in nearby Macedonia.

In 1926, another football club was established in Prishtina: Građanski, which primarily gathered the town's artisan youth. Unlike Kosova, Građanski was financially stronger and more structurally consolidated. The club took advantage of this and succeeded in registering with the Banovina Skopje Football Sub-League, although detailed records of the level of competition are not available.

=== 1939–1945: War years ===
In the beginning the club competed in Yugoslav lower leagues all the way until the beginning of World War II when the region was annexed to Albania. In 1942 Prishtina competed in the North group of the 1942 Albanian Championship finishing in fourth and bottom place of their group.

=== 1945–1981: First success in Yugoslavian Football ===
After the end of the war the club returned to the Yugoslav league system and played for mostly in the Yugoslav Second League. FC Prishtina won in 1945 and 1946 they won the Kosovo Province Title and are the first Kosovar to do so but the success did not end there. In the 1947 season Prishtina wrote history for being one of the founder clubs in the new SFR Yugoslavia Cup in this Season. In their first ever Cup match they played against Goce Delcev from Prilep. Prishtina won this match with 1–0 and qualify for the next Round. In the second round Prishtina had a harder tie against Rabotnicki Skopje from the second League, but Prishtina did not give up and won this Match away in Skopje with 1–2 and became the first Albanian club to ever reach the round of 16 in a regional competition in their first ever Cup Season. In the round of 16 Prishtina had to play away against Partizan despite a good performance they lost this match 2–0.

Prishtina also were close to qualify for their first time in the Yugoslav First League in the season 1972–73 but they lost the playoffs games against NK Osijek from Croatia and could not Progress in the Main division. After losing in the home in Prishtina the leg with 1–2 and away with 0–1 in Osijek.

=== 1981–1989: The Golden Generation ===

1983–84 Yugoslav First League starting lineup vs. Red Star Belgrade (4–4–2)

In the early 80s FC Prishtina stabilized and established its squad. The 1980–81 season was difficult both for Prishtina and for the entire population of Kosovo due to the contemporary political situation. In March 1981, Dimoski was replaced by another coach, Bela Palfi from Vojvodina, Hungary. He coached the team from March 1981 to July 1983. The team this season was forced to spend almost the entire spring season outside the city (in Kragujevac) due to the ban on sports activity in Kosovo. In the 1981-82 season Prishtina finished in 8th place, and in 1982-83 season, the white and blue team had finally started to make history. After 60 years, 20 of which were spent struggling in the Second League, a generation referred to as the Golden Generation was formed, drawing an average of 30,000 fans per match.

FC Prishtina competed for five consecutive seasons in their first Federal League. In their first year in the elite, they also played in the Central European Cup where they took second place among four teams. In the same year, two players from Prishtina, in the same match, make their debut for the then Yugoslav national team: the strikers: Fadil Vokrri and Zoran Batrović. At this time Prishtina was led by well-known Yugoslav football names. Fuad Muzurović had been the first Pristina coach to lead the team to be the best in its country and among the four or five strongest in Europe. Muzurović, later the coach of Bosnia and Herzegovina, had led the team from July 1983 to July 1984, returning in July 1985 and continuing to lead until August 1986.

After Muzurović first left the team, former Yugoslavian Vukašin Višnjevac took over the role. While he was a successful strategist, his team had mixed feelings about him and he only led Prishtna until November 1984. For the next three months Albanian coach Ajet Shosholli led the team with some success. Shosholli was only the second Albanian coach, after Mensur Bajrami (January–April 1977), who had led the team. Meanwhile, the leaders of the club had been forced to find a famous coach and chose Miroslav Blažević. He helped Prishtna reach third place in "France '98", ensuring they remained in the First League. His position only lasted for two months, long enough for him to remain one of the most memorable of that time. Over the next three seasons Prishtina was led by well-known strategists of the time: Milovan Đorić from October 1986 – September 1987 and Josip Duvančić from September 1987 – June 1988, with whom eventually Prishtina fell out of the league. At this point the team had lost some of its stars, some now retired, while the tense political situation and the decline of interest of Kosovo's political and social structures had made Pristina no longer able to stay in the first federal League. With the relegation from the League, Prishtina brought together the next generation of talented people from Kosovo led by another well-known name in former Yugoslav football, Milan Živadinović, from July 1988 – March 1989. In the first season since leaving the First League, Prishtina fought valiantly but did not manage to climb back into the elite.

Season	League	Pos	Pld	W	D	L	GF	GA	Pts	Notes
1979–80	Yugoslav Second League	6	30	11	11	8	27	25	33	2nd Round
1980–81	Yugoslav Second League	8	30	9	12	9	27	22	30	1st Round
1981–82	Yugoslav Second League	9	30	10	8	12	36	32	28	1st Round
1982–83	Yugoslav Second League	1	34	20	9	5	65	30	49	1st Round (promoted)
1983–84	Yugoslav First League	8	34	15	3	16	36	55	33	1st Round
1984–85	Yugoslav First League	10	34	13	6	15	44	49	32	1st Round
1985–86	Yugoslav First League	11	34	13	6	15	37	47	32	1st Round
1986–87	Yugoslav First League	14	34	13	4	17	47	52	30	1st Round
1987–88	Yugoslav First League	18	34	10	7	17	43	59	27	Semi-finals (relegated)
1988–89	Yugoslav Second League	10	38	18	5 (2)	15	42	40	32 ^{1}	1st Round ^{2}
1989–90	Yugoslav Second League	4	38	21	4 (1)	13	61	39	43	?^{2}
1990–91	Yugoslav Second League	8	36	16	3 (1)	17	48	44	33	?^{2}

Notes

^{1} Prishtina were docked six points due to match fixing in the last round of the previous season.
^{2} Two points for winners. If the game finished as a draw, penalty kicks were taken and only the winner gained one point. In brackets are those penalty-kick points.
^{3} Championship abandoned officially on 14 May 1999 due to the NATO bombing of Yugoslavia. Due to UNMIK, FC Prishtina were able to play in the Kosovan league system only.

=== After 1991 ===
After Kosovo self-proclaimed independence from Serbia, FC Prishtina left the Yugoslav football league system and became part of the Independent League of Kosovo, which became the highest football division of Kosovo and would be renamed to the Football Superleague of Kosovo after the Kosovo War in 1999. As the Kosovar club with most successful results in the past and the best infrastructure, FC Prishtina won the first edition of the competition in the 1991–92 season. Afterwards, it won the competition again in the 1995–96 and 1996–97 seasons.

Since 1991, FC Prishtina has been Kosovo champion 11 times, making it the most successful Kosovar club since Kosovo left the Yugoslav football league system. Between 1945 and 1991 the Kosovar league was a regional league of the Yugoslav league system, and FC Prishtina did not gather many titles in that league because it usually competed in higher national levels.

Serbian-run FK Priština, which claimed the club's pre-1991 legacy, continued to represent the city in the football league system of FR Yugoslavia.

== Supporters ==
Prishtina is an Albanian supported club with fans around Albanian communities in the Balkans and in Diaspora. The fans sing the Albanian National Anthem before every game and only affiliate with the Albanian nation and identity.

Plisat
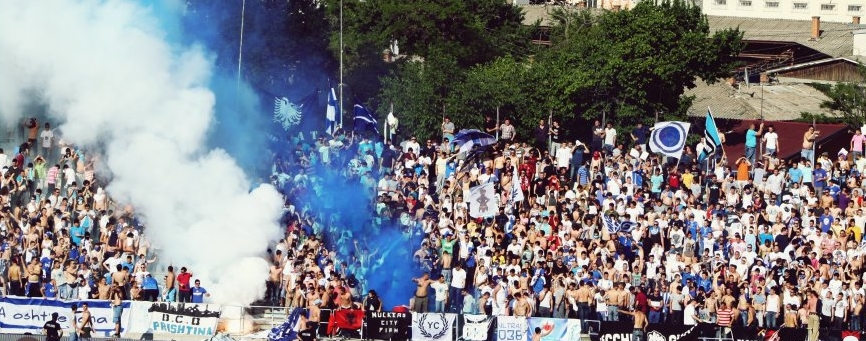
- Founded: 1987; 39 years ago
- Type: Supporters' group
- Motto: Rrugës sypatrembur (On the fearless road)
- Location: Pristina, Kosovo
- Arena: Fadil Vokrri Stadium
- Stand: East (until 2019); South (since 2019)
- Affiliations: (Albania) Tifozat Kuq e Zi

Plisat are the ultras group of Prishtina. They stand in the South part of the stadium. In the late eighties, there were quite a few small groups with different group names. It was in those years that most of the fans of Prishtina chose to identify as "Plisat". "Plisat" have never been separated from the club even during Yugoslavia's anti-Albanian policies. In addition to football, they started to follow and support the basketball club with the same fervour. As the organisation grew, it began to resemble some of the other large fan groups in the region and the rest of Europe. They also support the Albania National Team.

== Honours ==
FC Prishtina honours
Type	Competition	Titles	Seasons/Years
Domestic	Kosovo Superleague	11	1991–92, 1995–96, 1996–97, 1999–00, 2000–01, 2003–04, 2007–08, 2008–09, 2011–12, 2012–13, 2020–21
Domestic	Kosovar Supercup	11	1994–95, 1995–96, 2000–01, 2003–04, 2005–06, 2007–08, 2008–09, 2012–13, 2015–16, 2019–20, 2022–23
Domestic	Kosovo Province League	9	1945, 1946, 1947–48, 1953–54, 1958–59, 1960–61, 1976–77, 1978–79
Domestic	Kosovar Cup	9	1993–94, 1994–95, 2005–06, 2012–13, 2015–16, 2017–18, 2019–20, 2022–23, 2024–25
Domestic	Yugoslav Second League	1	1982–83
International	Albania Independence Cup	1	2013
	Mitropa Cup	Runners Up	1983-84
	Yugoslav Cup	Semifinals	1987-88
	Yugoslav Cup	Round of 16	19471971-72,1979-80,

== Prishtina in Europe ==
KF Prishtina competed for the Mitropa Cup finals in the 1983–84 season. Being Runner Up in this competition by a single point to Eisenstadt from Austria. Also being the first Kosovan Football side to compete in a UEFA Football competition and also the only Kosovan Football club that would reach a final in a UEFA Competition so far.

Prishtina competed in the UEFA Europa League for the first time in the 2017–18 season, entering at the first qualifying round. On 19 June 2017, in Nyon, the draw was held and Prishtina were drawn against Swedish side Norrköping. On 5 July 2018, Prishtina beat the Gibraltarian side Europa at Adem Jashari Olympic Stadium in Mitrovica and became the first Kosovan side to win a UEFA Europa League match.

Competition	Pld	W	D	L	GF	GA
UEFA Champions League	4	2	0	2	5	6
UEFA Europa League	11	2	4	5	9	18
UEFA Europa Conference League	6	2	2	2	9	9
Mitropa Cup	6	2	3	1	13	11
TOTAL	27	8	9	10	36	44

=== Matches ===
Season	Competition	Round	Opponent	Home	Away	Agg.
1983–84	Mitropa Cup	RR	(Austria) Eisenstadt	3–3	2–4	Runners-up
1983–84	Mitropa Cup	RR	(Hungary) Vasas	4–2	1–1	Runners-up
1983–84	Mitropa Cup	RR	(Czechoslovakia) Teplice	2–0	1–1	Runners-up
2017–18	UEFA Europa League	1Q	(Sweden) Norrköping	0–1	0–5	0–6
2018–19	UEFA Europa League	PR	(Gibraltar) Europa	5–0	1–1	6–1
2018–19	UEFA Europa League	1Q	(Luxembourg) Fola Esch	0–0	0–0	0–0 (4–5 p)
2019–20	UEFA Europa League	PR	(Gibraltar) St Joseph's	1–1	0–2	1–3
2020–21	UEFA Europa League	PR	(Gibraltar) Lincoln Red Imps	0–3 (awarded)		
2021–22	UEFA Champions League	PR	(San Marino) Folgore	2–0		
2021–22	UEFA Champions League	PR	(Andorra) Inter d'Escaldes	2–0		
2021–22	UEFA Champions League	1Q	(Hungary) Ferencváros	1–3	0–3	1–6
2021–22	UEFA Europa; Conference League	2Q	(Wales) Connah's Quay Nomads	4–1	2–4	6–5
2021–22	UEFA Europa; Conference League	3Q	(Norway) Bodø/Glimt	2–1	0–2	2–3
2025–26	UEFA Europa League	1QR	(Moldova) Sheriff Tiraspol	2–1	0–4	2–5
2025–26	UEFA Conference League	2QR	(Northern Ireland) Larne	1–1	0–0	1–1 (4–5 p)

=== UEFA club coefficient ranking ===
As of 29 September 2021

Rank	Team	Points	Country Part
278	(Israel) Bnei Yehuda	4.350	0.000
279	(Israel) Hapoel Haifa	4.350	0.000
280	(Kosovo) Prishtina	4.250	2.000
281	(Albania) Partizani	4.250	1.500
282	(Iceland) Stjarnan	4.250	1.000
283	(Armenia) Pyunik	4.250	0.000

=== Cups and Finals ===
==== Mitropa Cup ====
Team	Winners	Runners-up	Years won	Years runner-up
Prishtina	–	1	–	1983-84

== Players ==
=== Current squad ===
As of 1 September 2026

Note: Flags indicate national team as defined under FIFA eligibility rules; some limited exceptions apply. Players may hold more than one non-FIFA nationality.

No.	Pos.	Nation	Player
1	GK	KOS	Altin Gjokaj
2	DF	KOS	Drin Bajraktari
3	DF	ALB	Vangjel Zguro
4	MF	KOS	Dren Zeqiri
5	DF	MKD	Agron Rufati
6	DF	ALB	Anio Poçi
7	FW	KOS	Valmir Veliu
8	MF	KOS	Rigon Llugiqi
9	FW	KOS	Leotrim Kryeziu (captain)
10	MF	KOS	Blendi Baftiu
11	DF	KOS	Ardian Muja
12	GK	KOS	Eurolind Avdimetaj
14	FW	MKD	Mario Ilievski
15	DF	KOS	Diar Halili
17	FW	SEN	Assane Diatta
18	DF	KOS	Skifter Mustafa

No.	Pos.	Nation	Player
19	MF	KOS	Arjanit Fazlija
20	DF	KOS	Ramiz Bytyqi
21	DF	ALB	Flori Spahija
22	DF	NIG	Philippe Boueye
23	DF	COL	Jork Becerra
24	DF	MNE	Đorđe Šaletić
26	MF	KOS	Bebart Selmani
27	MF	KOS	Rin Ahmeti
29	FW	KOS	Ardian Hasani
40	GK	MKD	Artan Iljazi
42	DF	NED	Sylian Mokono
71	MF	KOS	Albin Krasniqi
77	FW	KOS	Unejs Mustafa
78	MF	KOS	Elod Gruda
91	FW	KOS	Lorik Mehmeti
99	FW	KOS	Kastriot Selmani

=== Out on loan ===
Note: Flags indicate national team as defined under FIFA eligibility rules; some limited exceptions apply. Players may hold more than one non-FIFA nationality.

No.	Pos.	Nation	Player
30	FW	KOS	Amar Demolli (at Drenica until 30 June 2027)
32	MF	KOS	Amar Ahmeti (at Vjosa until 30 June 2027)
33	DF	KOS	Lorian Fazliu (at Lepenci until 30 June 2027)
55	MF	KOS	Jon Shala (at Dinamo Ferizaj until 30 June 2027)

No.	Pos.	Nation	Player
—	DF	KOS	Reis Paci (at Flamurtari until 30 June 2027)
—	MF	KOS	Leon Haxhiu (at Lepenci until 30 June 2027)
—	FW	KOS	Arlind Dobroshevci (at Trepça until 30 June 2027)
—	FW	KOS	Erjon Jashanica (at Lepenci until 30 June 2027)

=== Notable former players ===
This is a list of FC Prishtina players with senior national team appearances:

Kosovo and Albania

- Youth
1. (Albania) (Kosovo) Agim Zeka
2. (Kosovo) Ardin Dallku
3. (Kosovo) Bledar Hajdini
4. (Kosovo) Edon Zhegrova
5. (Albania) Eros Grezda
- Senior
1. (Albania) Ahmed Januzi
2. (Kosovo) Anel Rashkaj
3. (Albania) (Kosovo) Ardian Ismajli
4. (Albania) Armend Dallku
5. (Kosovo) Armend Thaqi
6. (Albania) (Kosovo) Besnik Hasi
7. (Albania) (Kosovo) Debatik Curri
8. (Albania) (Kosovo) Enis Gavazaj
9. (Kosovo) Kushtrim Mushica
10. (Albania) Liridon Latifi
11. (Albania) (Kosovo) Mehmet Dragusha
12. (Kosovo) Mentor Zhdrella
13. (Kosovo) Visar Bekaj
14. (Albania) (Kosovo) Ylber Ramadani
15. (Kosovo) Yll Hoxha

Other countries

1. (Croatia) (Kosovo) Ardian Kozniku
2. (Croatia) (Kosovo) Kujtim Shala
3. (Montenegro) Draško Božović
4. (Serbia and Montenegro) Goran Đorović
5. (Socialist Federal Republic of Yugoslavia) Fadil Vokrri
6. (Socialist Federal Republic of Yugoslavia) Ismet Hadžić
7. (Socialist Federal Republic of Yugoslavia) Vladan Radača
8. (Socialist Federal Republic of Yugoslavia) Vladislav Đukić
9. (Socialist Federal Republic of Yugoslavia) Zoran Batrović

== Personnel ==
=== Technical staff ===
Current technical staff
Position	Name
Head coach	(Albania) Orges Shehi
Assistant coach(es)
Assistant coach(es)	(Albania) Sebino Plaku
Assistant coach(es)	(Albania) Artan Karapici
Goalkeeping coach	(Kosovo) Ahmet Beselica
Video Analyst	(Kosovo) Shkumbin Gërguri
Sports Director	(Kosovo) Driton Krasniqi
Team Manager	(Kosovo) Faton Zejnullahu
Office	Name
President	(Kosovo) Rrahman Haradini
General Director	(Kosovo) Artan Osmani
Secretary	(Kosovo) Kushtrim Sopa
Treasurer	(Kosovo) Ismet Grainca
Board members
Board members	(Kosovo) Hashim Deshishku
Board members	(Kosovo) Beqir Cerkezi
Board members	(Kosovo) Ragip Mustafa
Board members	(Kosovo) Hakif Gashi
Information and media officer	(Kosovo) Jon Ajeti

=== List of FC Prishtina managers ===
This is the list of coaches of FC Prishtina:

1. (Socialist Federal Republic of Yugoslavia) Dragiša Jovanović (1948 – 1949)
2. (Socialist Federal Republic of Yugoslavia) Petar Purić (1953 – 1954)
3. (Socialist Federal Republic of Yugoslavia) Franjo Laci (1954 – 1956)
4. (Socialist Federal Republic of Yugoslavia) Gaida Bogojevski (1956 – 1957
5. (Socialist Federal Republic of Yugoslavia) Klara Stoimirović (1958 – 1959
6. (Socialist Federal Republic of Yugoslavia) Antun Herceg (1959 – 1960)
7. (Socialist Federal Republic of Yugoslavia) Petar Purić (1960 – 1961)
8. (Socialist Federal Republic of Yugoslavia) Ilija Rajković (1961)
9. (Socialist Federal Republic of Yugoslavia) Slavko Stanić "Firga" (1961 – 1963)
10. (Socialist Federal Republic of Yugoslavia) Đorđe Kačunković (1964 – 1965)
11. (Socialist Federal Republic of Yugoslavia) Slavko Stanić "Firga" (1966 – 1967)
12. (Socialist Federal Republic of Yugoslavia) Luka Malešev (1969 – 1971)
13. (Socialist Federal Republic of Yugoslavia) Moma Ilić (1972 – 1973)
14. (Socialist Federal Republic of Yugoslavia) Kemal Omeragić (1973 – 1974)
15. (Socialist Federal Republic of Yugoslavia) Ferat Karabegu (1974)
16. (Socialist Federal Republic of Yugoslavia) Slavko Stanić "Firga" (1974 – 1975)
17. (Socialist Federal Republic of Yugoslavia) Ika Kalević (1976 – 1977)
18. (Socialist Federal Republic of Yugoslavia) Dragan Bojović (1977 – 1978)
19. (Socialist Federal Republic of Yugoslavia) Ševket Luković (1978)
20. (Socialist Federal Republic of Yugoslavia) Aca Milačić (1978 – 1979)
21. (Socialist Federal Republic of Yugoslavia) Ilija Dimoski (1979 – 1980)
22. (Socialist Federal Republic of Yugoslavia) Bela Palfi (1981 – 1983)
23. (Socialist Federal Republic of Yugoslavia) Fuad Muzurović (1983 – 1984)
24. (Socialist Federal Republic of Yugoslavia) Vukašin Višnjevac (Aug 1984 – Nov 1984)
25. (Socialist Federal Republic of Yugoslavia) Ajet Shosholli (Nov 1984 – Mar 1985)
26. (Socialist Federal Republic of Yugoslavia) Miroslav Blažević (Mar 1985 – Jun 1985)
27. (Socialist Federal Republic of Yugoslavia) Fuad Muzurović (1985 – 1986)
28. (Socialist Federal Republic of Yugoslavia) Kemal Omeragić (1986)
29. (Socialist Federal Republic of Yugoslavia) Milovan Đorić (1986 – 1987)
30. (Socialist Federal Republic of Yugoslavia) Josip Duvančić (1987 – 1988)
31. (Socialist Federal Republic of Yugoslavia) Milan Živadinović (1988 – 1989)
32. (Socialist Federal Republic of Yugoslavia) Hysni Maxhuni (1989 – 1990)
33. (Republic of Kosova) Ajet Shosholli (1990 – 1994)
34. (Republic of Kosova) Burim Hatipi (1994 – 1995)
35. (Republic of Kosova) Jusuf Tortoshi (1995 – 1998)
36. (Kosovo) Ajet Shosholli (1999 – 2000)
37. (Kosovo) Jusuf Tortoshi (2000 – 2001)
38. (Albania) Medin Zhega (2001 – 2002)
39. (Kosovo) Arbnor Morina (2002)
40. (Kosovo) Ramiz Krasniqi (2002)
41. (Kosovo) Ajet Shosholli (2002 – 2005)
42. (Kosovo) Fadil Muriqi (2005 – 2006)
43. (Kosovo) Ramiz Krasniqi (2006)
44. (Kosovo) Kujtim Shala (2006 – 2007)
45. (Kosovo) Ramadan Cimili (2007)
46. (Kosovo) Afrim Tovërlani (2007 – 2009)
47. (Kosovo) Besnik Kollari (2009)
48. (Kosovo) Skënder Shengyli (2009)
49. (Kosovo) Ramiz Krasniqi (2010 – Nov 2011)
50. (Germany) Wolfgang Jerat (2011)
51. (Kosovo) Jusuf Tortoshi (2011)
52. (Kosovo) Ejup Mehmeti-Kapiti (– 18 Oct 2012)
53. (Kosovo) Afrim Tovërlani (2012 – 2014)
54. (Kosovo) Suad Keçi (2 Apr 2014 – Jun 2014)
55. (Kosovo) Bylbyl Sokoli (7 Jul 2014 – 20 Apr 2015)
56. (Kosovo) Ramiz Krasniqi (20 Apr 2015 – 19 Oct 2015)
57. (Kosovo) Sami Sermaxhaj (21 Oct 2015 – Mar 2016)
58. (Kosovo) Fadil Berisha (22 Mar 2016 – 27 Jun 2016)
59. (Kosovo) Kushtrim Munishi (2 Jul 2016 – Sep 2016)
60. (Germany) Lutz Lindemann (21 Sep 2016 – 29 Mar 2017)
61. (Kosovo) Arsim Thaqi (29 Mar 2017 – Sep 2017)
62. (Albania) Mirel Josa (19 Sep 2017 – 2 Sep 2019)
63. (Kosovo) Bylbyl Sokoli (4 Sep 2019 – 21 Sep 2019)
64. (Albania) Armend Dallku (21 Sep 2019 – 4 Sep 2020)
65. (North Macedonia) Zekirija Ramadani (4 Sep 2020 – 14 Nov 2021)
66. (Bosnia and Herzegovina) Abdulah Ibraković (14 Nov 2021 – 14 May 2022)
67. (Kosovo) Ismet Munishi (3 June 2022 – 13 Mar 2023)
68. (Albania) Debatik Curri (13 June 2023 – 25 Oct 2023)
69. (Nigeria) Ndubuisi Egbo (26 Oct 2023 – 2 Jun 2024)
70. (France) Jean-Michel Cavalli (9 Jun 2024 – 5 Apr 2025)
71. (Kosovo) Arsim Thaqi (6 Apr 2025 – 14 Nov 2025)
72. (Kosovo) Afrim Tovërlani (25 Nov 2025 – 17 Mar 2026)
73. (Kosovo) Alban Dragusha (18 Mar 2026 – 27 May 2026)
74. (Albania) Orges Shehi (5 June 2026 –)

=== List of the presidents ===
This is the list of presidents of FC Prishtina:

1. (Socialist Federal Republic of Yugoslavia) Karaman Krushka (1948–1950)
2. (Socialist Federal Republic of Yugoslavia) Kolë Shiroka (1951–1956)
3. (Socialist Federal Republic of Yugoslavia) Jovo Šotra (1956–1960s)
4. (Socialist Federal Republic of Yugoslavia) Mirko Koprivica (1963–1965)
5. (Socialist Federal Republic of Yugoslavia) Jovica Milosavljević (1965–1967)
6. (Socialist Federal Republic of Yugoslavia) Rasim Sholla (1967–1970)
7. (Socialist Federal Republic of Yugoslavia) Borislav Božović (1970–1971)
8. (Socialist Federal Republic of Yugoslavia) Gani Pula (1971–1973)
9. (Socialist Federal Republic of Yugoslavia) Ramadan Vraniqi (1973–1976)
10. (Socialist Federal Republic of Yugoslavia) Gani Pula (1976–1977)
11. (Socialist Federal Republic of Yugoslavia) Blagoje Kostić (1977–1981)
12. (Socialist Federal Republic of Yugoslavia) Nazmi Mustafa (1981–1983)
13. (Socialist Federal Republic of Yugoslavia) Sadik Vllasaliu (1982–1983)
14. (Socialist Federal Republic of Yugoslavia) Mehmet Maliqi (1983–1984)
15. (Socialist Federal Republic of Yugoslavia) Muharrem Ismajli (1984–1986)
16. (Socialist Federal Republic of Yugoslavia) Bajram Tmava (1986–1988)
17. (Socialist Federal Republic of Yugoslavia) Živorad Ivić (1988–1989)
18. (Socialist Federal Republic of Yugoslavia) Shefget Keçekolla (1989)
19. (Socialist Federal Republic of Yugoslavia) Mile Savić (1989–1990)
20. (Republic of Kosova) Beqir Aliu (1991–1999)
21. (Kosovo) Sylejman Selimi (2000–2001)
22. (Kosovo) Lutfi Dervishi (2001–2003)
23. (Kosovo) Fadil Vokrri (2003–2004; interim board)
24. (Kosovo) Remzi Ejupi (2004–2022)
25. (Kosovo) Hakif Gashi (2022–2023)
26. (Kosovo) Rrahman Haradini (2023–present)

== Kit suppliers ==
Kit provider	Period	Shirt sponsor
(United States) Nike	2007–08	Eurokoha
(Turkey) LIG	2008–13	zëri
(Spain) joma	2013–15	germanwings
(Denmark) Hummel	2015–18	Eurokoha
(Germany) Jako	2019–2022	
(Germany) Jako	2019–2022	RIO mare
(Kosovo) Phoenix Sport	2022–present	RIO mare

== Statistics in Superleague of Kosovo ==
The all-time list of football clubs that have participated in the Kosovo Superleague, prior to the 2019–2020 season. The ranking is based on the total accumulated points by Prishtina.

Club was disbanded

No.	Club	Apps.	Matches	Wins	Ties	Losses	Goals +/-	Points	Titles										
No.	Club	Apps.	Matches	Wins	Ties	Losses	Goals +/-	Points	Titles	1	Prishtina	20	657	375	149	133	1033:491	1274	10

Season	League	Pos	Pld	W	D	L	GF	GA	Pts	Notes
1999–00 1. 34 23 7 4 69-24 76 2000–01 1. 30 18 9 3 53-19 63 2001–02 6. 26 11 5 10 34-23 38 2002–03 2. 26 14 8 4 53-14 50 2003–04 1. 24 16 4 4 41-16 52 2004–05 4. 32 14 7 11 35-33 49 2005–06 2. 32 22 6 4 53-19 72 2006–07 2. 30 18 7 5 60-26 61 2007–08 1. 30 20 5 5 61-19 65 2008–09 1. 30 16 9 5 46-25 57 2009–10 2. 33 16 7 10 38-32 55 2010–11 2. 33 21 6 6 56-23 69 2011–12 1. 33 19 8 6 63-31 65 2012–13 1. 33 22 7 4 66-26 73 2013–14 2. 33 17 6 10 39-26 57 2014–15 2. 33 15 11 7 43-28 56 2015–16 8. 33 12 7 14 29-34 43 2016–17 2. 33 22 6 5 46-18 72 2017–18 2. 33 18 10 5 39-18 64 2018–19 2. 33 23 6 4 49-12 75 2019–20 4. 33 18 8 7 59-25 62

== All-time Club Records (1957–2026) ==
The following tables list FC Prishtina's all-time record appearance makers and goalscorers since 1957, when complete club statistics began to be officially documented. The records include official matches played in the Yugoslav football system (First, Second and Third Divisions) and the Kosovo Superliga. All figures are based on the official club monograph 100 vjet klubi i futbollit Prishtina by Esad Ejupi. Updated as of August 2026

=== Most appearances for Prishtina (1957–2026) ===
Rank	Player	NAT	Position	Years	Seasons in Superliga (Kosovo)	Seasons in YU First Division	Seasons in YU Second Division	Seasons in YU Third Division	Total games
1	Danilo Stevanovic	(Socialist Federal Republic of Yugoslavia)	Defender	1964–1977	–	–	12	1	354
2	Dragan Radosevic	(Socialist Federal Republic of Yugoslavia)	Defender	1961–1975	–	–	14	–	272
3	Egedi Reshi	(Socialist Federal Republic of Yugoslavia)	Defensive Midfielder	1957–1970	–	–	13	–	263
4	Marko Cejlovic	(Socialist Federal Republic of Yugoslavia)	Defender	1961–1971	–	–	9	–	257
5	Azem Ahmeti	(Kosovo)	Midfielder	2006–2015	9	–	–	–	254
6	Fadil Muriqi	(Socialist Federal Republic of Yugoslavia)	Offensive Midfielder	1978–1988	–	5	6	–	241
7	Florim Humolli	(Kosovo)	Midfielder	1995–2009	12	–	–	–	235
8	Lorik Boshnjaku	(Kosovo)	Midfielder	2014–2022	8	–	–	–	233
9	Leotrim Kryeziu	(Kosovo)	Striker	2020–present	7	–	–	–	228
10	Agim Cana	(Socialist Federal Republic of Yugoslavia)	Offensive Midfielder	1973–1985	–	3	6	2	222
11	Besnik Krasniqi	(Kosovo)	Defender	2008–2022	7	–	–	–	220
12	Petar Mladenovic	(Socialist Federal Republic of Yugoslavia)	Offensive Midfielder	1961–1971	–	–	9	1	216
13	Burim Hatipi	(Socialist Federal Republic of Yugoslavia)	Offensive Midfielder	1963–1976	–	–	11	2	213
14	Gauthier Mankenda	(Republic of the Congo)	Striker	2015–2022	8	–	–	–	212
15	Ahmet Beselica	(Kosovo)	Goalkeeper	1991–2004	11	–	–	–	211
16	Erdogan Celina	(Socialist Federal Republic of Yugoslavia)	Defender	1970–1981	–	–	7	–	207
17	Endrit Krasniqi	(Kosovo)	Midfielder	2014–2023	7	–	–	–	203
18	Afrim Toverlani	(Kosovo)	Midfielder	1985–2003	9	3	2	–	193
19	Arbnor Morina	(Kosovo)	Defender	1984–1997	6	4	3	–	188
19	Kushtrim Mushica	(Kosovo)	Goalkeeper	2001–2015	9	–	–	–	188
21	Liridon Kukaj	(Kosovo)	Defender	2012–2017	7	–	–	–	185
22	Peter Doncic	(Socialist Federal Republic of Yugoslavia)	Midfielder	1969–1977	–	7	1	–	184
23	Arben Zhjeqi	(Kosovo)	Defender	1999–2008	7	–	–	–	183
24	Labinot Ibrahimi	(Kosovo)	Defender	2005–2013	9	–	–	–	175
25	Dushan Shuica	(Socialist Federal Republic of Yugoslavia)	Striker	1966–1973	–	6	–	–	177
26	V. Gjukic	(Socialist Federal Republic of Yugoslavia)	Defender	1963–1970	–	7	–	–	177
27	Mensur Nexhipi	(North Macedonia)	Midfielder	1983–1990	–	5	3	–	176
28	Shfeqet Sinani	(Socialist Federal Republic of Yugoslavia)	Defender	1977–1987	–	4	5	1	175
29	Driton Krasniqi	(Kosovo)	Midfielder	2003–2015	12	–	–	–	175

Note: Leotrim Kryeziu is an active player still with the club (as of August 2026).

=== Top goalscorers (1957–2026) ===
Rank	Player	NAT	Years	Position	Total games	Official goals
1	Dushan Shuica	(Socialist Federal Republic of Yugoslavia)	1966–1973	Striker	177	96
2	Kushtrim Munishi	(Kosovo)	1991–2008	Striker	105	64
3	Sheremet Isufi	(Kosovo)	2000–2006	Striker	163	60
4	Lubomir Cvetkovic	(Socialist Federal Republic of Yugoslavia)	1968–1975	Striker	183	55
4	Fadil Vokrri	(Socialist Federal Republic of Yugoslavia)	1980–1986	Striker	173	55
6	Agim Cana	(Socialist Federal Republic of Yugoslavia)	1973–1985	Offensive Midfielder	222	51
7	Petar Mladenovic	(Socialist Federal Republic of Yugoslavia)	1961–1971	Offensive Midfielder	216	50
8	Dragolub Kostic	(Socialist Federal Republic of Yugoslavia)	1971–1976	Striker	159	50
9	Leotrim Kryeziu	(Kosovo)	2020–present	Striker	228	47
10	Azem Ahmeti	(Kosovo)	2006–2015	Midfielder	254	46

Note: Leotrim Kryeziu is an active player still with the club (as of August 2026).

== Notes and references ==
=== Explanatory notes ===
1. During the period 1991–99, FC Prishtina had two chairmen who led the team in two different leagues as Kosovo. An Albanian chairman who led FC Prishtina playing for the Independent League of Kosovo, an unrecognised competition parallel to the Serbian league system, and a Serbian chairman who led FC Prishtina playing for the Serbian league system.
