= 1992–93 Albanian National Championship =

Albanian National Championship
- Season: 1992–93
- Champions: Partizani; 15th Albanian title
- Relegated: Kastrioti; Tomori; Pogradeci
- Champions League: Partizani
- UEFA Cup: None
- Cup Winners' Cup: Albpetrol
- Matches: 240
- Goals: 545 (2.27 per match)
- Top goalscorer: Edmond Dosti (21 goals)

The 1992–93 Albanian National Championship was the 54th season of the Albanian National Championship, the top professional league for association football clubs, since its establishment in 1930.

== Teams ==
=== Stadia and last season ===
Locations of the 1992–93 Albanian National Championship teams

Team	Location	Stadium	Capacity	Last season
Albpetrol	Patos	Alush Noga Stadium	2,150	Kategoria e Dytë
Apolonia	Fier	Loni Papuçiu Stadium	10,000	10th
Besa	Kavajë	Besa Stadium	8,000	4th
Dinamo Tirana	Tirana	Qemal Stafa Stadium (Note: Dinamo Tirana, Partizani and Tirana all shared the Qemal Stafa Stadium as well as the Selman Stërmasi Stadium.)	19,700	5th
Elbasani	Elbasan	Ruzhdi Bizhuta Stadium	15,000	11th
Flamurtari	Vlorë	Flamurtari Stadium	15,000	6th
Kastrioti	Krujë	Kastrioti Stadium	10,000	14th
Laçi	Laç	Laçi Stadium	5,000	12th
Lushnja	Lushnjë	Abdurrahman Roza Haxhiu Stadium	12,000	7th
Partizani	Tirana	Qemal Stafa Stadium	19,700	2nd
Pogradeci	Pogradec	Qemal Stafa Stadium	10,700	13th
Sopoti	Librazhd	Sopoti Stadium	3,000	Kategoria e Dytë
Teuta	Durrës	Niko Dovana Stadium	12,040	3rd
Tirana	Tirana	Qemal Stafa Stadium	19,700	8th
Tomori	Berat	Tomori Stadium	14,750	9th
Vllaznia	Shkodër	Loro Boriçi Stadium	15,000	Champions

== League table ==
Pos	Team	Pld	W	D	L	GF	GA	GD	Pts	Qualification or relegation
1	Partizani (C)	30	17	9	4	53	22	+31	43	Qualification for the Champions League preliminary round
2	Teuta	30	15	8	7	32	21	+11	38	
3	Besa	30	14	9	7	42	22	+20	37	
4	Vllaznia	30	15	7	8	44	26	+18	37	
5	Elbasani	30	12	7	11	36	32	+4	31	
6	Dinamo Tirana	30	10	9	11	32	33	−1	29	
7	Apolonia	30	9	10	11	41	43	−2	28	
8	Lushnja	30	10	8	12	30	35	−5	28	
9	Albpetrol	30	10	8	12	38	48	−10	28	Qualification for the Cup Winners' Cup qualifying round
10	Laçi	30	11	6	13	26	37	−11	28	
11	Tirana	30	7	13	10	24	28	−4	27	
12	Sopoti	30	9	9	12	36	41	−5	27	
13	Flamurtari	30	8	11	11	28	34	−6	27	
14	Kastrioti (R)	30	8	10	12	29	32	−3	26	Relegation to the 1993–94 Kategoria e Dytë
15	Tomori (R)	30	11	3	16	28	53	−25	25	Relegation to the 1993–94 Kategoria e Dytë
16	Pogradeci (R)	30	8	5	17	26	38	−12	21	Relegation to the 1993–94 Kategoria e Dytë

Source: RSSSF.org
(C) Champions; (R) Relegated

== Results ==
Home \ Away	ALB	APO	BES	DIN	ELB	FLA	KAS	LAÇ	LUS	PAR	POG	SOP	TEU	TIR	TOM	VLL
Albpetrol		1–1	0–0	3–0	0–2	2–3	4–2	1–1	3–1	1–1	1–0	2–1	2–0	1–0	0–1	2–1
Apolonia	2–0		3–1	1–1	3–0	0–0	3–3	2–1	3–0	2–1	1–1	2–1	0–0	1–1	3–0	1–0
Besa	3–0	1–0		1–1	2–0	0–0	1–0	2–1	0–0	1–0	2–1	4–0	0–0	7–1	3–0	0–1
Dinamo	2–3	2–0	1–2		3–2	0–0	0–1	1–0	0–0	0–4	1–0	3–2	1–1	0–0	4–0	1–0
Elbasani	1–1	3–1	2–0	2–1		0–0	3–1	5–0	0–0	0–0	2–1	3–0	0–1	2–0	3–1	1–0
Flamurtari	1–1	0–0	0–1	1–3	2–1		1–1	4–1	1–1	0–2	1–0	0–0	0–0	2–1	2–0	3–1
Kastrioti	0–1	3–1	0–0	1–0	1–1	3–2		0–0	2–0	1–1	0–1	2–0	1–0	0–0	2–0	1–1
Laçi	3–0	1–0	0–0	2–1	0–0	1–0	1–0		1–1	2–1	2–0	2–1	1–0	1–0	2–0	1–1
Lushnja	1–1	4–2	0–2	1–1	1–0	2–0	1–0	3–0		2–0	3–1	0–0	0–1	1–3	2–1	1–0
Partizani	5–2	5–1	1–1	0–0	6–0	1–0	2–1	1–0	2–1		2–0	2–0	1–0	2–1	5–1	2–2
Pogradeci	1–1	3–2	1–0	2–1	0–1	1–0	1–0	1–0	2–3	1–1		2–2	0–1	0–0	3–0	1–2
Sopoti	4–1	2–1	2–1	1–1	1–0	4–3	1–1	2–0	1–0	1–2	4–1		2–1	0–0	0–1	1–1
Teuta	4–2	1–1	2–1	1–0	2–1	2–0	3–1	4–1	1–0	0–0	2–1	2–1		1–0	2–0	0–0
Tirana	2–1	1–0	1–1	0–1	1–1	1–1	0–0	3–0	3–0	0–1	1–0	1–1	0–0		0–0	2–1
Tomori	4–1	3–3	1–4	1–2	1–0	0–1	2–1	1–0	2–0	1–1	1–0	1–0	2–0	1–0		2–6
Vllaznia	1–0	3–1	3–1	1–0	2–0	4–0	1–0	2–1	2–1	0–1	1–0	1–1	2–0	1–1	3–0	

Source: CalcioMondialeWeb.it
Legend: Blue = home team win; Yellow = draw; Red = away team win.

== Season statistics ==
=== Top scorers ===
Rank	Player	Club	Goals
1	(Albania) Edmond Dosti	Partizani	21
2	(Albania) Kujtim Majaci	Apolonia	19
3	(Albania) Ilir Duro	Besa	19
4	(Albania) Genci Laçka	Pogradeci	11
4	(Albania) Aurel Dushi	Lushnja	11
4	(Albania) Anesti Vito	Flamurtari	11
7	(Albania) Albert Haxhia	Sopoti	10
7	(Albania) Spartak Qosha	Kastrioti	10
7	(Albania) Andi Vuthi	Laçi	10
7	(Albania) Nikolin Coçlli	Partizani	10
