= 2012 Viva World Cup =

Tournament details
- Host country: Iraq (Kurdistan Region)
- Dates: 4–9 June
- Teams: 9 (from 2 confederations)
- Venues: 5 (in 4 host cities)

Final positions
- Champions: Kurdistan Region (1st title)
- Runners-up: Northern Cyprus
- Third place: Zanzibar
- Fourth place: Provence

Tournament statistics
- Matches played: 18
- Goals scored: 102 (5.67 per match)
- Top scorer(s): (Northern Cyprus) Halil Turan (Provence) Christophe Copel (6 goals)

The 2012 Viva World Cup was the fifth and final Viva World Cup, an international tournament for football open to non-FIFA-affiliated teams, played in the Iraqi Kurdistan. It marked a new record in the competition's history, with nine teams competing for the Nelson Mandela Trophy, from 4 to 9 June. Al Iraqiya signed a television rights agreement with the NF-Board and the Kurdistan Football Association to broadcast all the matches.

== Participating teams ==
Team	2012 Pos.	Participation
Kurdistan Region	1st	4th
Northern Cyprus	2nd	1st
Zanzibar	3rd	1st
Provence	4th	4th
Occitania	5th	4th
Western Sahara	6th	1st
Tamil Eelam	7th	1st
Raetia	8th	1st
Darfur	9th	1st

== Venues ==
City	Stadium	Capacity	Event
Erbil	Franso Hariri Stadium	40,000	Group stages and final
Duhok	Duhok Stadium	20,000	Semi-finals
Sulaymaniyah	Sulaymaniyah Stadium	15,000	Group stages
Erbil	Brayati Stadium		Group stages
Salahaddin	Ararat Stadium		Group stages

== Group stage ==
Key to colours in group tables
Teams that advanced to the semi-finals

=== Group A ===
Team	Pld	W	D	L	GF	GA	GD	Pts
Kurdistan Region	2	2	0	0	7	0	+7	6
Occitania	2	1	0	1	6	3	+3	3
Western Sahara	2	0	0	2	2	12	−10	0

4 June 2012
20:00 AST

Kurdistan Region	6–0	Western Sahara
Mushir 12' (pen.); Sherzad 16', 33'; Halgurd 74'; Aziz 82', 90'	Report

Franso Hariri Stadium, Erbil
Attendance: 9,000
5 June 2012
17:00 AST

Western Sahara	2–6	Occitania
Budah 52'; Malum 56'	Report	Flourens 6'; Bertini 12', 14'; Amiel 67'; Quéré 72' (pen.); Patrac 75'

Ararat Stadium, Salahaddin
Attendance: 200
6 June 2012
17:00 AST

Occitania	0–1	Kurdistan Region
	Report	Ismael 28'

Sulaymaniyah Stadium, Sulaymaniyah
Attendance: 10,000

=== Group B ===
Team	Pld	W	D	L	GF	GA	GD	Pts
Zanzibar	2	2	0	0	9	0	+9	6
Raetia	2	1	0	1	1	6	−5	3
Tamil Eelam	2	0	0	2	0	4	−4	0

4 June 2012
22:00 AST

Zanzibar	6–0	Raetia
Mcha 33', 41', 52'; Kassim 51'; Juma 88', 90'	Report

Franso Hariri Stadium, Erbil
5 June 2012
20:30 AST

Raetia	1–0	Tamil Eelam
Dudler 83'	Report

Franso Hariri Stadium, Erbil
6 June 2012
21:30 AST

Tamil Eelam	0–3	Zanzibar
		Mcha 22'; Omar 61'; Juma 90'

Franso Hariri Stadium, Erbil
Referee: Osman Özpaşa

=== Group C ===
Team	Pld	W	D	L	GF	GA	GD	Pts
Provence	2	2	0	0	20	1	+19	6
Northern Cyprus	2	1	0	1	16	2	+14	3
Darfur	2	0	0	2	0	33	−33	0

4 June 2012
17:00 AST

Northern Cyprus	15–0	Darfur
Turan 11', 17', 23', 44', 50', 90'; Çıdamlı 14', 76', 81'; Börekçi 21'; Kayalilar 34'; Güvensoy 46', 61', 63'; Yaşinses 87'	Report

Brayati Stadium, Erbil
5 June 2012
22:30 AST

Darfur	0–18	Provence
	Report	Mdahoma 4'; Zenafi 5', 40', 59'; Copel 19', 32', 59', 68', 75'; S.Abbes 23', 49', 50', 77', 83'; Y.Abbes 41', 54'; Taba 47'; Lescoualch 66'

Franso Hariri Stadium, Erbil
6 June 2012
23:30 AST

Provence	2–1	Northern Cyprus
Zenafi 28'; Lescoualch 35'		Tağman 26'

Franso Hariri Stadium, Erbil

== Knockout stage ==
Semi-finals
8 June – Duhok
Kurdistan Region	2
Provence	1
8 June – Duhok
Northern Cyprus	2
Zanzibar	0

Final
9 June – Erbil
Kurdistan Region	2
Northern Cyprus	1
Third place
9 June – Erbil
Provence	2
Zanzibar	7

=== 9th Place Match ===
7 June 2012
17:30 AST

Western Sahara	5–1	Darfur
Budah 31', 85'; Malum 80'; Maaruf 87'; El Mami 90'		Moubarak 46'

Franso Hariri Stadium, Erbil

=== 5th–8th Place Semi-finals ===
7 June 2012
20:30 AST

Occitania	7–0	Tamil Eelam
Martinez 30', 51'; Patrac 49'; Dalzon 50'; Thomas 64'; Massaré 83'; Hernandez 89'

Franso Hariri Stadium, Erbil
8 June 2012
17:00 AST

Western Sahara	3–0	Raetia
Moulay 59'; El Mami 83'; Boiah 87'

Franso Hariri Stadium, Erbil

=== 7th Place Match ===
9 June 2012
10:00 AST

Tamil Eelam	4–0	Raetia
Nagulendran 59', 67', 71'; Sri 79'	Report

Franso Hariri Stadium, Erbil

=== 5th Place Match ===
9 June 2012
11:00 AST

Occitania	3–1	Western Sahara
Thomas 35'; Bertini 55'; Amiel 86'		Bijah 90'

Ararat Stadium, Salahaddin (Pirmam)

=== Semi-finals ===
8 June 2012
18:30 AST

Kurdistan Region	2–1	Provence
Ismael 2', 59'	Report	Zenafi 36'

Duhok Stadium, Duhok
Attendance: 12,500
8 June 2012
20:15 AST

Zanzibar	0–2	Northern Cyprus
	Report	Yaşinses 58'; Kayalilar 69' (pen.)

Duhok Stadium, Duhok

=== 3rd Place Match ===
9 June 2012
16:30 AST

Provence	2–7	Zanzibar
Taba 44'; Copel 57'		Suleiman 22', 23', 71'; Mcha 35', 68', 90'; Kassim 58'

Franso Hariri Stadium, Erbil

=== Final ===
9 June 2012
19:00 AST

Kurdistan Region	2–1	Northern Cyprus
Halgurd 9' (pen.); Siamand 32'	Report	Mohamad 42' (o.g.)

Franso Hariri Stadium, Erbil
Attendance: 22,000

Viva World Cup 2012 winners

Kurdistan Region
First title
