= Western Sahara national football team =

National association football team

Western Sahara
- Nickname: الإبل (The Dromedaries)
- Association: Sahrawi Football Federation
- Confederation: World Unity Football Alliance
- Head coach: Mohendi Abdelay
- Captain: Ali Radjel
- Most caps: El-Mahfoud Welad (5)
- Top scorer: Sahia Ahmed Budah (4)
- Home stadium: Stade de Tindouf
- FIFA code: SADR; ESH
First colours	Second colours

First international
- Unofficial (Algeria) FLN football team Veterans – Western Sahara (Algiers, Algeria; Date 20 August 1955); Official; Western Sahara 2–2 Basque Country (Tindouf, Algeria; 23 December 2011)

Biggest win
- Unofficial; Rock No War Team – Western Sahara (Tindouf, Algeria; Date 8 May 2002); Official; Western Sahara 5–1 Darfur (Arbil, Iraq; 7 June 2012); Western Sahara 4–0 Esperanto (Villeneuve-d'Ascq, France; 31 July 2015)

Biggest defeat
- Western Sahara 3–17 EUGA Ardziv (Armenia) (Marseille, France; 23 June 2013)

Viva World Cup
- Appearances: 1 (first in 2012)
- Best result: Sixth place (2012)

The Western Sahara national football team (Arabic: منتخب الصحراء الغربية لكرة القدم, Spanish: Selección de fútbol del Sahara Occidental) represents Western Sahara (SADR), a disputed territory occupied by Morocco, in association football. Governed by the Sahrawi Football Federation, they are members of the World Unity Football Alliance for non-FIFA-affiliated nations.

== History ==
=== Origins (1976–2003) ===
Many teams have represented Western Sahara, or the Sahrawi Arab Democratic Republic (SADR), in unofficial matches. One of the earliest known football games of the Sahrawi national team took place in 1976, when they faced off against veterans of the FLN football team. The historic match was held at the iconic 20 August Stadium in Algiers, and the Sahrawi team was coached by Rachid Mekhloufi, an esteemed figure in Algerian football

More friendlies would be played later on in 1984 against different teams of the Algerian football league. In 1986–87, the Sahrawi selection would go to face different Italian and Spanish teams before formally establishing the Sahrawi Football Federation in 1989. A year before that In 1988, the Sahrawi selection would even face Le Mans UC 72 in France, in a game they would lose 3–2. More games would be played in 1994 as part of a friendlies tour of Algeria, before disappearing off the radar in the following years.

On 27 February 2001, during the 25th anniversary of the proclamation of the SADR, a match was played in the Sahrawi refugee camps in Tindouf, Algeria between a Sahrawi Republic team and a Basque Country veterans team. The match was attended by more than 4,000 fans, but was abandoned during the second half owing to the temperature (38 °C) with the score tied at 2–2.

A year later on 8 May 2002, another game was set between "Rock no war", a foundation dedicated to promoting peace through music and sports, and the newly established Sahrawi national team. The game ended with a victory for the latter by a score of 6–2.

=== NF-Board membership and foundation (2003–2012) ===
On 12 December 2003, the Sahrawi Football Federation (SFF) became one of the first members to be provisionally affiliated to the New Football Federations-Board (N.F.-Board) . The SFF failed to attend the 2006 N.F.-Board AGM but were present in the 6th General Assembly held on 5 December 2009 in Paris, France. In 2007, a team representing Western Sahara beat Macau 1–0.

On 23 December 2011, a mixed-gender team from the Spanish region of Galicia beat a team composed of members of the Sahrawi diaspora in Spain 2–1, in a match played in Teo that was attended by 1,500 fans.

=== 2012 VIVA World Cup ===
On 25 March 2012, Mohamed Moulud Mohamed Fadel, SADR Minister for Youth and Sports, announced the official creation of the Sahrawi national football team. After which, the minister announced that the national team would be participating in the upcoming VIVA World Cup held in Iraqi Kurdistan.

Trials were held a few days later in the camps and eventually a team of 20 players was selected, all of them playing for local teams. The team held a five-day internship at the "Chahid Am-mi Lamjeilil" Officer Training School in preparation, and on 30 May, the Sahrawi selection traveled to the Algerian capital, where they conducted a short training session at Omar Hamadai Stadium in Bologhine before leaving for the competition.

All members of the Sahrawi mission traveled to Arbil using Sahrawi passports. However, when presented to the Kurdish authorities, the latter initially refused to grant the selection entry, stating that the document was not recognized. The authorities insisted that the team could only enter under the name of Morocco, which the team refused, stating that they would rather wait for a plane back than do so. After some negotiations with the Kurdistan government, however, the team was finally granted entry.

Thus, the Sahrawi national football team made its official international debut at the inauguration match of the VIVA World Cup, playing against the host team, Kurdistan at the Franso Hariri Stadium in Arbil, Iraq on 4 June 2012. The Dromedaries lost 6–0 to the team which went on to win the tournament. Their next match was against Occitania, a 6–2 defeat, and the team finished in third position in Group A. The next match was a play-off against Darfur, and ended in a 5–1 victory, Sahrawi's first official international victory. They beat Raetia 3–0 before losing the fifth place match 3–1 to Occitania.

The Sahrawi national football team and federation had to face a deal made between the Kurdistan Regional Government and the Government of Morocco, which consisted of avoiding the display of the SADR flag during ceremonies and matches of the tournament. Despite this, the SADR team managed to arrange extraofficial deals with all their rivals to fly the Sahrawi flag wave on the stadiums where they played their matches.

=== ConIFA and Zamenhof Cup (2012–2020) ===
On 31 July 2015, the Sahrawi team beat the Esperanto Team by 4–0 at the Stadium Lille Métropole. The match was part of the Zamenhof Cup, an event during the 100th World Esperanto Congress.

On 13 April 2018, the ConIFA announced the death of El-Mahfoud Welad, the goalkeeper of the Western Sahara national team, who was killed during the 2018 Algerian Air Force Il-76 crash.

In 2020, Western Sahara would participate in the 2020 CONIFA World Football Cup, but due to logistical problems, the team withdrew from playing in the competition, which would later be cancelled due to the COVID-19 pandemic.

=== Present (2020–present) ===
In June 2020, Western Sahara joined the World Unity Football Alliance.

The ambassador of the Sahrawi Arab Democratic Republic in Algeria, Abdelkader Taleb Omar, announced on 18 May 2023 in Algiers the "official birth" of the Sahrawi football team, on the occasion of the festivities marking the 50th anniversary of the creation of the Polisario Front.

Led by Mohandi Abdelahy Mulay, the Sahrawi selection played against the dean of Algerian clubs, the historic Mouloudia Club of Algiers, at the new 'Nelson Mandela' stadium in Baraki, on the outskirts of the Algerian capital. The match ended 6–1 in favor of the Algerian club. Mustafa Troncoso, a skilled striker representing Coria CF in Spain, managed to find the back of the net in the first minutes of the game and secured the sole goal for the Sahrawi team. Most Sahrawi players in the selection compete in various football leagues in Spain, France, Germany, and Sweden, with the addition of three other players who play on teams from the Refugee camps in Tindouf.

The second game in the Western Sahara national football team's friendly series in Algeria was played three days later at the Mabrouki Salem Stadium in Rouiba. They faced against MC Rouiba, a club that evolved in the Honour Division 1 of the Algerian Championship. The match ended on a 3–3 tie with Fadili Deich, Ali Radjel and Boulahi Nan scoring the goals for the Sahrawi selection.

The Sahrawi national football team was honored at the headquarters of Algerian newspaper El Moudjahid, overseen by the Mishaal El Shaheed Association. The ceremony was attended by several dignitaries including the Algerian Minister of Mujahideen, and the Sahrawi Ambassador to Algeria, along with other ambassadors from several countries. The team received honorary medals, and their achievements were praised as a step towards international recognition. The event highlighted pledges of future support and the establishment of internships for the team in participating countries.

== Team image ==
The old logo of the Sahrawi National Football team featuring a dromedary.

=== Kits and crest ===
Kit provider	Period
(Australia) AMS Clothing	2016–2018
(Spain) Orlo Sport	2020–2021
(Spain) Cejudo	2021–present

The Sahrawi national football team traditionally adorned predominantly green jerseys for the first years of their inception, however since 2021 the Sahrawi selection adopted a new home kit that is white with black sleeves, inspired by the main colours of the Sahrawi flag. Conversely, the away kit embraced a blend of black and green and a third kit was introduced, featuring the signature full green colouring.

The crest of the Sahrawi national team used to feature a dromedary which inspired the nickname of the team. However in 2021, the Sahrawi Football Federation adopted a new crest featuring a gazelle, a typical animal of the Sahrawi fauna. On a post on their official Twitter page, they explained the meaning behind the new crest being that the gazelle "represents beauty and elegance ... it's synonymous with skill and agility; adjectives that represent our players well".

=== National stadium ===
Stade Sheikh Mohamed Laghdaf in Laayoune seats 15,000

== Coaching staff ==
As of May 2023.

Position	Name
Head coach	(Western Sahara) Mohandi Abdelay Mulay
Assistant coaches	(Spain) Francisco José Cruz (Spain) Juanma Suárez
Goalkeeping coach	(Western Sahara) Bal-la Abeidi Salek
Trainer	(Spain) Adrián Sanchez López
Doctor	(Algeria) Medjahed Mehdi
Physiotherapist	(Western Sahara) Lakroute Mohamed Lamin

=== Coaching history ===
- (Western Sahara) Sidahmed Erguibi Ahmed Baba Haiai (2010 – 2017)
- (Western Sahara) Mohandi Abdelay Mulay (2018 – present)

== Players ==
=== Current squad ===
- The following players were called up for the friendly game against MC Alger (Algeria)
- Match dates: 20 May 2023
- Caps and goals correct as of: 23 May 2023, after the match against MC Rouiba (Algeria).

No.	Pos.	Player	Date of birth (age)	Caps	Goals	Club
1	GK	Mohamed Yeslem		1	0	
2	DF	Nico Deidih		1	0	
3	DF	Faly Mulay		1	0	
4	DF	Ismail Islem		1	0	
5	DF	El Ghailani Mohamed Salem		1	0	
6	MF	Kentaui Mohamed Salem		1	0	
7	FW	Jordi Sid Ahmed		1	0	
8	MF	Brahim Monak		1	0	
9	FW	Ali Radjel Cheikh Bachir	18 January 1998 (age 28)	2	1	(Royal Spanish Football Federation) CD Palencia Cristo Atlético
10	MF	Mustapha Tronsno Espinar		1	1	
11	FW	Osman Daddah		1	0	
12		Bulahi Nan		2	1	
13		Wanati Khalihina		1	0	
14		Fadili Deich		2	1	
15		Mohammed Elouali		1	0	
16	GK	Ozman Mulay		1	0	(Sahrawi Football Federation) Al Salam CS
17		Ismael Mouloud		1	0	
18		Moulud Sais		1	0	
19		Husein Mohamed		1	0	
20		Salkou Nan		1	0	
21		Malainin Luchaa		1	0	
22	GK	Mohammed Buda		1	0	(Sahrawi Football Federation) Al Salam CS

=== Notable players ===
- (Western Sahara) Sahia Ahmed Budah – national team top scorer

== Competitive record ==
=== World tournaments ===
World tournaments record
Year	Result	Position	GP	W	D	L	GS	GA
VIVA World Cup
(Occitania) 2006	Did not enter							
(Sápmi) 2008	Did not enter							
(Padania) 2009	Did not enter							
(Gozo) 2010	Did not enter							
(Kurdistan Region) 2012	Group stage	6th	5	2	0	3	8	16
International Tournament of Peoples, Cultures and Tribes
2013	Group stage	6th	3	0	0	3	5	35
Zamenhof Cup
(France) 2015	Champion	1st	1	1	0	0	4	0
ConIFA World Football Cup
(Sápmi) 2014	Did not enter							
(Abkhazia) 2016	Did not enter							
(Barawa) 2018	Did not qualify							
Total	1 title	3/10	9	3	0	6	17	51

== All-time record ==
As of 23 May 2023 after the match against MC Rouiba

=== Against other nations ===
Positive Record Neutral Record Negative Record

Opponent	Pld	W	D	L	GF	GA	GD
Basque Country	1	0	1	0	2	2	0
Darfur	1	1	0	0	5	1	+4
Esperanto	1	1	0	0	4	0	+4
Galicia	1	0	0	1	1	2	−1
Kurdistan Region	2	0	0	2	0	12	−12
Macau	1	1	0	0	1	0	+1
Occitania	2	0	0	2	3	9	−6
Raetia	1	1	0	0	3	0	+3
Tibet	1	0	0	1	2	12	−10
Total	11	4	1	6	21	38	−15

=== Against club sides ===
Positive Record Neutral Record Negative Record

Opponent	Pld	W	D	L	GF	GA	GD
(Spain) Celta de Vigo Veterans	1	1	0	0	3	1	+2
(Algeria) CSA Aek Tindouf	1	0	0	1	0	1	−1
(France) ESM Gonfreville	1	0	1	0	2	2	0
(France) FC Gournay	1	1	0	0	2	1	+1
(France) Le Mans FC	1	0	0	1	2	3	−1
(Algeria) MC Alger	1	0	0	1	1	6	-5
(Algeria) MC Rouiba	1	0	1	0	3	3	0
(Spain) Rìa de Noia - Muros Selection	1	0	0	1	0	2	-2
(Italy) Rock No War Team	1	1	0	0	6	2	+4
(Spain) S.D. Sarriana	1	1	0	0	3	1	+2
(Spain) UD Puçol	1	0	0	1	1	6	−5
(Armenia) UGA Ardeiv	1	0	0	1	3	17	−14
UNHCR	1	0	1	0	3	3	0
Total	13	4	3	6	29	48	−19

=== Selected internationals ===
Key to matches

- Att. = Match attendance
- (H) = Home ground
- (A) = Away ground
- (N) = Neutral ground

Key to record by opponent

- Pld = Games played
- W = Games won
- D = Games drawn
- L = Games lost
- GF = Goals for
- GA = Goals against

No.	Date	Venue	Opponents	Score	Competition	Western Sahara scorers	Att.	Ref.
—	1976	20 August 1955 Stadium, Algeria	(Algeria) FLN football team Veterans	–	Friendly	Unknown	–	
—	1988	France	(France) Le Mans UC 72	2–3	Friendly	Unknown	–	
1	27 February 2001	Tindouf	Basque Country	2–2	25th anniversary of the SADR proclamation	Unknown	4,000	
—	8 May 2002	Tindouf	(Italy) Rock No War Team	6–2	Friendly	Unknown	–	
2	2007		Macau	1–0	Friendly	Unknown	–	
3	23 December 2011	Cacherias, Teo	Galicia	1–2	Friendly	Unknown	1,500	
4	4 June 2012	Franso Hariri Stadium, Erbil	Kurdistan Region	0–6	2012 Viva World Cup		9,000	
5	5 June 2012	Ararat Stadium, Salahaddin	Occitania	2–6	2012 Viva World Cup	Budah, Malum	200	
6	7 June 2012	Franso Hariri Stadium, Arbil	Darfur	5–1	2012 Viva World Cup	Budah (2) Malum, Maaruf, El Mami	–	
7	8 June 2012	Franso Hariri Stadium, Arbil	Raetia	3–0	2012 Viva World Cup	Ali, El Mami, Boiah	–	
8	9 June 2012	Ararat Stadium, Salahaddin	Occitania	1–3	2012 Viva World Cup	Bijah	–	
—	23 June 2013	Stadium Albert Eynaud, Marseille	(Armenia) UGA Ardeiv	3–17	2013 International Tournament of Peoples, Cultures and Tribes	Budah, unknown goals (2)	–	
9	24 June 2013	Stade Bonneveine Terrades, Marseille	Kurdistan Region	0–6	2013 International Tournament of Peoples, Cultures and Tribes		–	
10	28 June 2013	Henri Michellier Stadium, Marseille	Tibet	2–12	2013 International Tournament of Peoples, Cultures and Tribes	Raghoua (2)	–	
—	27 March 2014	Sarria	(Spain) S.D. Sarriana	3–1	Friendly	Daf (2), Nazy	–	
—	28 March 2014	Vigo	(Spain) Celta de Vigo Veterans	3–1	Friendly	Adda (2), Daf	–	
—	29 March 2014	Noia	(Spain) Ría de Noia - Muros Selection	0–2	Friendly		–	
11	31 July 2015	Stadium Lille Métropole, Villeneuve-d'Ascq	Esperanto	4–0^{1}	2015 Zamenhof Cup	Unknown	–	
—	13 August 2016	20 August 1955 Stadium, Algiers	(Algeria) NA Hussein Dey	–	Friendly^{2}		–	
—	17 June 2017	Stade de Tindouf, Tindouf	UNHCR	3–3	Friendly	Boglaida (2), Mohammed	–	
—	10 August 2018	Pep Claramunt Stadium, Valencia	(Spain) UD Puçol	1–6	Friendly	Unknown	–	
—	20 February 2019	Stade de Tindouf, Tindouf	(Algeria) CSA Aek Tindouf	0–1	Friendly		–	
—	3 August 2022	Stade Océane, Le Havre	(France) SS Gournay	2–1	Friendly	Fadili, Ismael Mou	–	
—	6 August 2022	Stade Océane, Le Havre	(France) ESM Gonfreville	2–2	Friendly	Sidahmed (2)	–	
—	19 May 2023	Nelson Mandela Stadium, Algiers	(Algeria) MC Alger	1–6	Friendly	Boudah	~30,000	
—	23 May 2023	Mabrouki Salem Stadium, Rouiba	(Algeria) MC Rouiba	3–3	Friendly	Deich, Radjel, Nan	–	

Notes

^1 The game was abandoned half way due to equipment being stolen from the Esperanto team locker room.

^2 The game was cancelled due to the Sahrawi team not getting the required authorisations in time.
