= N.F.-Board =

Federation for football associations

New Football Federations-Board (Note: Commonly known as the New Federations-Board, and unofficially as the Nouvelle Fédération-Board, or the Non-FIFA Board. Later in its lifespan, the N.F.-Board directly said the name Nouvelle Fédération-Board was wrong, as well as any other expansions of the name.)
- Logo

- Flag
- Formation: 12 December 2003; 22 years ago
- Type: Sports governing body
- Headquarters: Saint-Christophe-et-le-Laris, France
- Members: 0 (since 2017, membership has been abolished) (Note: In 2017, the N.F.-Board said they had 53 member associations, of which 27 were Associates, 20 were "Suspended" (withdrawn), and 6 were "Historical". Of that number, 42 of the FAs have teams, whilst 8 of them do not; 1 (Southern Lower Saxony) is a joke FA, and 2 weren't members of the NFB at all (Yap and Pohnpei, three if you count Kiribati).)
- Official language: French, and additionally English and Spanish
- President: (Switzerland) David Aranda
- Parent organisation: World Football Observatory
- Website: https://NFBWebsite.WixSite.com/NFBoard

The N.F.-Board (New Football Federations-Board; NFB) is a federation for football associations established on 12 December 2003. The NFB is made up of teams that represent nations, dependencies, unrecognized states, minorities, stateless peoples, regions and micronations not affiliated to FIFA.

One of the founders was Luc Misson, a lawyer who represented Belgian footballer Jean-Marc Bosman in a case that led to the Bosman ruling.

== History ==
=== Foundation ===
The N.F.-Board was founded on 12 December 2003 by the World Football Observatory (French: Observatoire Mondial des Footballs (Note: originally Foot-Ball); OMF) in À la Mort Subite, a bar in Brussels, consisting of 5 members: Northern Cyprus, Sápmi, Monaco, Western Sahara, and the Chagos Islands.

When the NFB was founded, a deadline was set for applications: 15 January 2004. However, at some point, it was postponed to May, and the candidate member list ballooned to 76 members. This list included the Falkland Islands, Greenland, Tibet, Guadeloupe, Jersey, Vatican City, Corsica, Brittany, and Catalonia.

Many more members came to apply soon after the founding. The first known four to apply were Greenland, Tibet, and possibly Jersey, and Guernsey.

At first, the N.F.-Board had planned to host their first event, the Viva World Cup, in 2005. However, due to a lack of budget at the time, it was postponed to 2006.

=== Early controversies ===
==== ELF Cup ====
In 2006, the first Viva World Cup was initially planned in Northern Cyprus after validation of a reconnaissance visit by the management of the N.F.-Board, political changes took place in the meantime in this territory, with repercussions on the Federation of Northern Cyprus football. Northern Cyprus no longer admits to receiving certain football associations, the Emergency Committee of the N.F.-Board takes the decision to cancel the edition planned there and to transfer the competition to Hyères in France. In response, the Northern Cyprus Football Federation announced the organization of the ELF Cup and promised to pay the travel expenses of the participants, the competition will be won by the Northern Cyprus selection.

==== Departure of Monaco ====
In 2010, the Monaco Football Association left the N.F.-Board. The captain of the selection at the time, Yohan Garino, explains: "For political reasons, we are not authorized by our government to play against certain teams. We also had some problems with the NF-Board which used photos of the Monaco Football Association and Prince Albert as advertising for their many matches without authorization. We were particularly disappointed by this last point which is very detrimental to us".

==== Breakup of the N.F.-Board ====
During the Kurdistan 2012 Viva World Cup, a large sum of money intended for the event disappeared. The Belgian tax authorities subsequently investigated. Disputes arose among the founders. At the 2013 Annual General Meeting in Munich, Christian Michelis, one of the founders of the N.F.-Board, resigned as president, but as there were still many financial irregularities in his presidency that needed investigation, the NFB did not accept. Michelis denied this, and the association subsequently suspended him. Thus, the organizational structure collapsed, and the association existed only on paper.

Swedish referee Per-Anders Blind, who also officiated at Viva World Cup matches and attended the Annual General Meeting in Munich, was subsequently approached by various member associations to make a new football confederation. Blind, in response, founded the Confederation of Independent Football Associations (CIFA; now CONIFA) in August 2013. In 2024, the NFB also made the claim that Michelis had reached out to Per-Anders Blind to approve of the creation of CONIFA, shortly after his resignation.

Due to the N.F.-Board's problem with organising tournaments ever since the fracture, CONIFA has been the new ruler of the Non-FIFA scene ever since.

==== Cease and Desist ====
On 17 November 2013, a cease and desist was filed against the N.F.-Board by CONIFA, for defamation by Jean Luc-Kit and the NFB's official website. However, no followup actions have been taken despite its continuation.

==== Statuses of Yap and Pohnpei ====
The N.F.-Board lists Yap and Pohnpei as members. However, in 2015, former coach of the Pohnpei soccer team, Paul Watson, revealed that neither of them had actually joined. He further elaborated in 2017, saying: "At the time I was on Pohnpei, the only non-FIFA organisation was the NF-Board. Although they organised some very impressive Viva World Cups for non-FIFA teams, around the time I was in Pohnpei they had become less active and their communications weren’t very convincing. They seemed to want Pohnpei on their list for the sake of listing them, so we never joined. In spite of that, the NF-Board continues to list Pohnpei and Yap, despite the fact nobody on the island has ever spoken to them".

=== Attempted revival ===
==== 2014 Viva World Cup ====
Plans for the 2014 Viva World Cup fell through, first with Östersund in Sápmi, of whom had applied in 2010, however left for CONIFA; then with the Isle of Man who did so at an unknown time, however the NFB claimed to continue the application again for a "pseudo European Championship" in 2015; and finally with Tatarstan in 2013–2014, as Andrei Rudakov, the person they were discussing with to make the tournament, had been summoned for embezzlement, and a lack of time to organise a new tournament as the Viva World Cup for that year.

==== The Viva Cups of 2017 ====
On 6 May 2017, the N.F.-Board announced its return, making the claim that they would be taking over leadership of the Non-FIFA scene once again. 2 weeks later, on 21 May, they announced the 2017 Euro Viva Cup, (Note: Also called the EUROVIVA-Cup 2017.) the 2018 Women Viva World Cup, and the possibility of making a second (Note: The first one was the Confederation of European New Federations, which lasted from 2007–2009) European branch of the N.F.-Board called NFB-EUROPE, all in Vichy. One day later, they updated the countries' positions on the NFB's website, suspending most Associates and graduating the provisional associations to Associate, or suspending them, or even removing them entirely. On 6 December, however, the Vichy authorities had communicated that negotiations with the N.F.-Board had been interrupted for some time, and that no tournament would be held.

==== 2025 Mixed Viva World Cup ====
On 1 February 2024, the N.F.-Board announced the 2025 Mixed Viva World Cup, which would have "both a mix of genres and a mix of rules of the game", and is said to be restricted to non-FIFA UN countries, subdivisions of countries, and transnational/indigenous people. The cup was scheduled to run from June 20–29. However, the event was cancelled due to unknown reasons.

==== 2026 and 2028 Viva World Cups ====
On 18 January 2025, they, once again, announced 2 new Viva World Cups for 2026 and 2028, saying the 2026 Viva World Cup would also be restricted to non-FIFA UN countries, 2028, to the non-FIFA islands and archipelagos. But, they refused to disclose more detail about the two new Viva World Cups beyond that.

== Viva World Cup ==
The events that were placed are as follows (stricken-out events are cancelled, italicized ones are planned):

- 2006 Viva World Cup in Hyères, Occitania (Champion: Sápmi)
- 2008 Viva World Cup in Gällivare, Sápmi (Champion: Padania)
- 2009 Viva World Cup in Padania (Varese, Novara, Brescia, and Verona) (Champion: Padania)
- 2010 Viva World Cup in Gozo (Xewkija, and Sannat) (Champion: Padania)
- 2012 Viva World Cup in Kurdistan (Erbil, Salahaddin, Sulaymaniyah, and Duhok) (Champion: Kurdistan)
- ~~2014 Viva World Cup in Kazan, Tatarstan~~
- ~~2017 Viva World Cup in Vichy, France~~
- 2026 Viva World Cup in TBD
- 2028 Viva World Cup in TBD

=== Women's editions ===
The N.F.-Board also hosted women's editions of the Viva World Cup.

- 2008 Women Viva World Cup in Gällivare, Sápmi (Champion: Sápmi)
- 2010 Women Viva World Cup in Gozo (Champion: Padania)
- ~~2011 Women Viva World Cup in Padania~~
- ~~2013 Women Viva World Cup in Tifariti, Western Sahara~~
- ~~2018 Women Viva World Cup in Vichy, France~~

=== Other versions of the Viva World Cup ===
There have also been multiple attempts to have different forms of the Viva World Cup, those being:

- 2017 Euro Viva Cup in Vichy, France
- 2025 Mixed Viva World Cup in Drôme de Collines, France

Both attempts, however, were cancelled.

== N.F.-Board former members ==
Europe (24)
Selection	Association	Region	Code
Associated (12)
Cilento	???	Cilento, Italy	CIL
(Gagauzia) Găgăuzia	Găgăuzia Football Federation (Romanian: Federaţia de Fotbal Găgăuzia)	Gagauzia, Moldova	GGZ
**Gozo**	Gozo Football Association	Gozo, Malta	GOZ
Labaj	Football Federation of Terra Brigasca Labaj (Italian: Federazione Calcistica Tera Brigasca Labaj)	Terra Brigasca (France, Italy)	LBJ
**Padania**	Padania Football Association (Italian: Lega Federale Calcio Padania)	Padania, Italy	PAD
**Provence**	Provençal Football Federation (French: Fédération Provençal de Football)	Provence, France	PRO
Saugeais	Saugette Football Federation (French: Fédération Saugette de Football)	Republic of Saugeais	SGE
Sealand	Sealand National Football Association	Principality of Sealand	SEA
Seborga	Seborga Football Federation (Italian: Federazione Calcistica del Principato di Seborga)	Principality of Seborga	SBG
Rijeka	Football Federation of the Free State of Rijeka	Free State of Rijeka	RIJ
**Two Sicilies**	Kingdom of the Two Sicilies FA (Italian: Regno delle Due Sicilie FA)	Two Sicilies, Italy	RDS
Wallonia*	Walloon Football Federation (French: Fédération Wallonne de Football)	Wallonia, Belgium	WLN
Withdrawn (8)
Franconia (Note: Franconia applied in 2013, at the meeting of which it broke down. They never spoke again ever since that meeting, however it seems they may still be in it.)	Franconian Football Association (German: Fränkischen Fußball-Bund)	Franconia, Germany	FKE
**Monaco**	Monégasque Football Federation (French: Fédération Monégasque de Football)	Principality of Monaco	MCO
**Northern Cyprus**	Cyprus Turkish Football Association (Turkish: Kıbrıs Türk Futbol Federasyonu)	Turkish Republic of Northern Cyprus	TNC
**Occitania**	Occitan Football Association (Occitan: Association Occitana de Fotbòl)	Occitania (Spain, France, Italy)	OCC
**Raetia**	FA Raetia	Raetia (Rhaetian people)	RAE
**Sápmi** (Note: Also called Samiland or Lapland.)	Sámi Football Association (Northern Sami: Sámi Spábbáčiekčanlihttu)	Sámi people (Norway, Sweden, Finland)	SAP
Skåneland	Scanian Football Federation (Swedish: Skånelands Fotbollsförbund)	Skåneland, Sweden	SKA
Székely Land (Note: Applied for the N.F.-Board, but was never formally approved. Treated as a member by the NFB anyway)	Székely Land Football Association (Hungarian: Székelyföld Labdarugó Egyesület)	Székely Land, Romania	SZE
Historical (4)
/ Chechnya	Chechnya Football Federation	Chechnya, Russia	CNY
Îles d'Or*	Football Association of Îles d'Or (French: Football Association des Îles d'Or)	Îles d'Hyères, France	IOR
None	NFB-EUROPE	Europe	55B
Sardinia	Sardinia Football Association (Italian: Lega Federale Calcio Sardegna)	Sardinia, Italy	SAR

Americas (4)
Selection	Association	Region	Code
Associated (2)
Easter Island	Football Association of Easter Island (Spanish: Asociación de Fútbol de Isla de Pascua)	Easter Island	RPN
West Indies	West Indies Football Association	West Indies	WIN
Withdrawn (2) (Note: Officially, the N.F.-Board gave the "Suspended" status to the countries which left the NFB to join CONIFA. In practice they withdrew from the organisation.)
**Cascadia** (Note: This had no team until 2018.)	Cascadia Association Football Federation	Cascadia (region) (USA, Canada)	CCD
Greenland	Football Association of Greenland (Greenlandic: Kalaallit Arsaattartuta Kattuffiat)	Greenland	GRL

Asia (6)
Selection	Association	Region	Code
Associated (4)
Himalaya	Himalaya Football Association	The Himalayas (Nepal, Bhutan, India, Pakistan, China, Afghanistan)	HIM
South Moluccas	Maluku Football Association	Republic of South Maluku	MLQ
**Tamil Eelam**	Tamil Eelam Football Association (Tamil: தமிழீழ உதைப்பந்தாட்டக் கழகம்)	Tamil Eelam, Sri Lanka	LKT
West Papua	Football Association West Papua	Western New Guinea, Indonesia	WPA
Withdrawn (2)
**Kurdistan Region**	Kurdistan Football Association (Kurdish: یەکێتی تۆپی پێی کوردستان,)	Kurdistan Region, Iraq	KUR
Tibet	Tibetan National Football Association (Tibetan: ???)	Tibetan people (in exile)	TIB

Africa (10)
Selection	Association	Region	Code
Associated (4)
Casamance	Casamance Football Association (French: Association Casamançaise de Football)	Casamance, Senegal	CSM
Maasai*	Maasai Football Federation	Maasai people (Kenya, Tanzania)	MAS
Peule*	Fula Football Federation (French: Fédération Peule de Football)	Fula people (West and Central Africa)	PEU
Southern Cameroons	Southern Cameroons Football Association	Ambazonia (Southern Cameroons)	CNM
Withdrawn (5)
Chagos Islands	Chagos Football Association	Chagos Archipelago, Indian Ocean	IOT
**Darfur**	Darfur Football Association (Arabic: ???)	Darfur, Sudan	DAR
Somaliland	Somaliland Football Association (Somali: Xidhiidhka Kubadda Cagta Somaliland, Arabic: صوماليلاند اتحاد كرة القدم)	Somaliland	SMD
**Western Sahara**	Sahrawi Football Federation (Arabic: الاتحاد الصحراوي لكرة القدم; Spanish: Federación Saharaui de Fútbol)	Western Sahara	ESH
**Zanzibar**	Zanzibar Football Federation	Zanzibar, Tanzania	ZAN
Historical (1)
None	NFB-AFRICA	Africa	22A

Worldwide (includes diaspora FAs) (5)
Selection	Association	Region	Code
Associated (3)
Apatrids*	Football Association of Apatrids	Stateless people	XXA
Esperantujo	World Esperanto Football Association (Esperanto: Tutmonda Esperanto Futbala Asociacio)	Esperantujo	ESO
Romani People	Roma Football Federation (French: Fédération Rom de Football)	Romani people (Europe, Asia, The Americas)	RMS
Withdrawn (2)
Cossack*	Cossack Football Federation (French: Cosaque Fédération Football; Russian: Казаки Федерация футбола) (Note: when the federation refers to themselves, "КАЗАК" is used in place of "Cossack" or "Cosaque".)	Cossack people (Europe, Asia, Cossack diaspora)	CSK
**Arameans Suryoye**	Football Association Arameans Suryoye	Syriacs (Arameans) (The Middle East, Syro-Aramean diaspora)	SRY

Source of member list: https://nfbwebsite.wixsite.com/nfboard/fa
The members in bold competed in at least one Viva World Cup.
The members in italic competed in one of the N.F.-Board's tournaments for women.
* means a member has an association, but currently, does not have a team.

=== Joke members ===
There is one joke member of the N.F.-Board:

- / South Lower Saxony (Association: South Lower Saxony Football Federation; Code: BSX) was said to be a joke by the president of the organisation. No team was made for the association and they only went to one meeting to celebrate their creation.

=== Non-members listed as members ===
The N.F.-Board also claims to have three members that never actually applied to the federation:

- Kiribati (Association: Kiribati Islands Football Association; Code: KIR)
- Yap (Association: Yap Soccer Association; Code: YAP)
- Pohnpei (Association: Pohnpei Soccer Association; Code: POH)

Yap seems to be the only one of the three which actually objected to being listed as a member, despite them never applying.

=== Executive Committee ===
==== Presidents ====
Presidents of the N.F.-Board
No.	Name	Country of origin	Took office	Left office
1	**Christian Michelis**	France	12 December 2003	23 February 2013
2	**Christophe Croze**	France	1 June 2013	1 May 2014
3	**Florent Costa**	France	1 May 2014	8 August 2016
4	**David Aranda**	Switzerland	8 August 2016	Incumbent

==== Premier Vice-Presidents ====
Presidents of the N.F.-Board
No.	Name	Country of origin	Took office	Left office
???	**Christophe Croze**	France	???	???

==== Vice-Presidents ====
Vice-presidents of the N.F.-Board
No.	Name	Country of origin	Took office	Left office
1	**Jean-Luc Kit**	Belgium	12 December 2003	1 June 2013
2	**Nelson Stenvot**	Belgium	1 June 2013	Incumbent

==== General Secretaries ====
General Secretaries of the N.F.-Board
No.	Name	Country of origin	Took office	Left office
1	**Luc Mission**	France	12 December 2003	1 June 2013
2	**Jean Luc-Kit**	Belgium	1 June 2013	Incumbent

=== Confederation of European New Federations (CENF) ===
On 30 December 2007, the Confederation of European New Federations (CENF) was created to be the European confederation of the N.F.-Board.

It was dissolved on 9 March 2009 before their planned tournament, the CENF Cup could be hosted, due to the N.F.-Board thought that they didn't need a European confederation at the time. Most of the former leadership of the CENF went on to be part of the Non-FIFA News Agency after its dissolution.

Due to the link rot of content related to the CENF, it is unknown if it garnered any member associations in its lifetime.

==== Leadership of the CENF ====
===== Presidents =====
Presidents of the CENF
No.	Name	Country of origin	Took office	Left office
1	**Paul David Carli**	Netherlands	11 November 2007	23 August 2008
2	**Iain Jeffree**	France	32 August 2008	9 March 2009

=== NF North America & Arctic Confederation (NFNAAC) ===
In 2008, the N.F.-Board took interest in the fact, that Carlos Rodriguez wanted to start a confederation of the NFB. It was most recently referred to as the NF North America & Arctic Confederation (NFNAAC), and previously as the North American and Arctic New Federations (NAANF) and the Confederation of North American New Federations (CNANF) (it had no official name up to 2014). It's supposed to represent teams from North America, Central America, the Caribbean, and the Arctic region that are not affiliated with FIFA.

Potential members include the Greenland, Québec, and the Wyandot Nation.

In December 2013, it was announced that the NFNAAC was going to have a meeting with the N.F.-Board in January 2014 in Québec, in order to actually found the confederation.

== See also ==
- Non-FIFA international football
- Confederation of Independent Football Associations
- World Unity Football Alliance
