= Provence football team =

National association football team

Provence
- Association: Association Provençale de Football
- Confederation: NF-Board (former)
- Head coach: Philippe Burgio
- Top scorer: Ennys Hammoud (5)
First colours	Second colours

First international
- Provence 0–4 Catalonia (3 April 1921)

Biggest win
- Provence 22–0 Tibet (Arbil, Iraq; 5 June 2012)

Biggest defeat
- Provence 0–6 Kurdistan Region (Varese, Padania; 25 June 2009)

VIVA World Cup
- Appearances: 4 (first in 2008)
- Best result: 4th place (2009, 2012)
- Website: prouvenco-football.org (defunct)

The Provence football team is the football team for the French territory of Provence. The team does not have affiliation with UEFA or FIFA, but was an affiliate member of the NF-Board from 2008–2017. It occasionally participates in international competitions, such as the Viva World Cup, finished fourth in 2009 and 2012.

== History ==
The Provence football team played its first matches against Catalonia on 3 and 4 April 1921, which ended in losses.

After years of uncertainty and rumours of a reformation in the 1960s, the team was relaunched in 2006, and it played its first matches since 1921 at the 2008 Viva World Cup, in Gällivare, Sweden, where they finished in the last place after losing all of their matches against Padania, Kurdistan, Assyrians (under the Aramean label), and Sápmi. After a losing streak of six games, the team finally claimed their first-ever win in a friendly match against Monaco (3–2). Three further participations followed in 2009, 2010, and 2012. Provence finished fourth in 2009, following a defeat in penalty shootouts to Sápmi in the match for third place.

Since then, the national team has been taken over by Philippe Burgio, and the former Valencia player revamped the team by calling up several players that he had trained when he was Olympique de Marseille's youth coach, who in 2012, were playing in the fourth to seventh French divisions. On 12 April 2012, the Provençal team played against EUGA Ardziv, intended to develop cohesion and create a team spirit around the project of Thierry Marcadé, President of the APF, which consists in making a good performance in the upcoming VIVA World Cup. With Burgio at the helm, they surprised many by finishing above Northern Cyprus in the group-stages, eventually losing to hosts Kurdistan in the semi-finals. lost in the semifinals of the 2012 edition to Kurdistan, and then lost the third-place match to Zanzibar (2–7).

In June 2013, the Provençale Association, in partnership with the Partners Sports International (PSI), organized the first edition of the International Tournament of Peoples, Cultures and Tribes, which took place between 22 June and 29 June 2013 in Marseille. In order to prepare itself for the tournament, Provence played a warm-up match against FC Sète 34 on 31 May, which presented themselves with a large group of 20 players including 7 on trial; trailing 2–1 at half-time, Provence was able to develop its collective game in the second half to win the game 3–2. In the tournament, Provence faced several teams, including Quebec, led by former Montreal Impact player Patrick Leduc, and reached the final, where they faced the reigning champions of the Viva World Cup, but ultimately losing 0–1.

== Notable players ==
- Samir Abbès - played professionally in Algeria

== Selected internationals ==
3 April 1921 Friendly	Catalonia	4–0	Provence	Barcelona, Catalonia
		Report		Stadium: Camp de la Indústria; Referee: Massana

4 April 1921 Friendly	Catalonia	1–0	Provence	Barcelona, Catalonia
				Stadium: Camp de la Indústria; Referee: Timer

8 July 2008 2008 VIVA World Cup	Provence	1–6	Padania	Gällivare Stadium, Gällivare
17:00	Giordano 23'	Report	Cossato 7'; Salandra 34', 45' (pen.); Ligarotti 36', 80'; Ferrari 90'	Attendance: 600; Referee: (Norway) Ragnar Dahl

9 July 2008 2008 VIVA World Cup	Provence	0–3	Kurdistan Region	Malmberget Stadium, Malmberget
13:00		Report	Rahman 55'; Halgurd 90+1', 90+3'	Attendance: 600; Referee: (Norway) Mikkel Sara

10 July 2008 2008 VIVA World Cup	Arameans Suryoye	5–0	Provence	Malmberget Stadium, Malmberget
12:00	Muqdisi 2', 32'; Alan 5'; Kaplan 65', 81'	Report		Attendance: 30; Referee: (Sweden) Jorgen Klippmark

12 July 2008 2008 VIVA World Cup	Sápmi	4–2	Provence	Gällivare Stadium, Gällivare
16:00	Eira 3'; Eira 7'; Logje 28'; Dreyer 83'	Report	Giordano 5', 14'	Attendance: 800; Referee: (Norway) Johnny Nielsen

20 December 2008 Friendly	Monaco	2–3	Provence	Cap-d'Ail, Monaco
		Report

22 June 2009 2009 VIVA World Cup group stage	Provence	3–1	Gozo	Stadio Silvio Piola, Novara
17:00 CET	Hammoud 36', 77'; Hammami 90+1'	Report	Camilleri 73'	Attendance: 100; Referee: Buonanno

23 June 2009 2009 VIVA World Cup group stage	Sápmi	1–2	Provence	Stadio Franco Ossola, Varese
17:00 CET	Bertelsen 5'	Report	Hammoud 37'; Hammami 64' (pen.)	Attendance: 50; Referee: Iodice

25 June 2009 2009 VIVA World Cup semifinals	Provence	0–6	Kurdistan Region	Stadio Franco Ossola, Varese
17:00 CET		Report	Aziz 6'; Sediq 16'; Qadir 25'; Abdullah 56', 80'; Abdulrida 71'	Attendance: 250; Referee: Modesti

26 June 2009 2009 VIVA World Cup 3rd-place match	Provence	4–4 (4–5 p)	Sápmi	Stadio Mario Rigamonti, Brescia
21:00 CET	Hammoud 14', 88'; Matel 16'; Bennattar 21'	Report	Thomassen 13', 53' (pen.); Bruer 18'; Reginiussen 82'

11 March 2010 Friendly	Padania	1–3	Provence	Italy
		[Report]

1 June 2010 2010 VIVA World Cup group stage	Provence	0–1	Two Sicilies	Sannat Ground, Sannat
17:30 CET		Report	Cappuccilli 5' (pen.)	Referee: Luciano Casnati (Italy)

2 June 2010 2010 VIVA World Cup group stage	Kurdistan Region	3–2	Provence	Sannat Ground, Sannat
17:30 CET	Qaraman 31', 90+5'; Rahman 35'	Report1; Report2	Borghesi 19', 39' (pen.)	Referee: Antonio Guida (Italy)

4 June 2010 2010 VIVA World Cup 5th-place match	Gozo	2–1	Provence	Gozo Stadium, Xewkija
15:30 CET	Buttigieg 59'; Camilleri 89'	Report1; Report2	Juan 19' (pen.)	Referee: Aaron Fenech (Malta)

12 April 2012 Friendly	Provence	3–2	(Marseille) EUGA Ardziv	Marseille, France
		Report		Stadium: Stade Senafrica

5 June 2012 2012 VIVA World Cup group stage	Darfur	0–18	Provence	Franso Hariri Stadium, Arbil
22:30 AST		Report	Mdahoma 4'; Zenafi 5', 40', 59'; Copel 19', 32', 59', 68', 75'; S.Abbes 23', 49', 50', 77', 83'; Y.Abbes 41', 54'; Taba 47'; Lescoualch 66'

6 June 2012 2012 VIVA World Cup group stage	Provence	2–1	Northern Cyprus	Franso Hariri Stadium, Arbil
23:30 AST	Zenafi 28'; Lescoualch 35'	Report	Tağman 26'

8 June 2012 2012 VIVA World Cup semifinals	Kurdistan Region	2–1	Provence	Duhok Stadium, Duhok
18:30 AST	Ismael 2', 59'	Report	Zenafi 36'	Attendance: 12,500

9 June 2012 2012 VIVA World Cup 3rd Place Match	Provence	2–7	Zanzibar	Franso Hariri Stadium, Arbil
16:30 AST	Taba 44'; Copel 57'	Report	Suleiman 22', 23', 71'; Mcha 35', 68', 90'; Kassim 58'

13 February 2013 Friendly	Provence	6–1	Monaco	Saint-Zacharie, France
		Report

31 May 2013 Friendly	FC Sète 34	2–3	Provence	Marseille, France
	Goal	Report	Zénafi (3–2); Crus (2–2)

22 June 2013 International Tournament of Peoples, Cultures and Tribes	Provence	3–2	(Marseille) EUGA Ardziv	Marseille, France
		[ Report]		Stadium: Stade Senafrica

23 June 2013 International Tournament of Peoples, Cultures and Tribes	Provence	22–0	Tibet	Marseille, France
		[ Report]

27 June 2013 International Tournament of Peoples, Cultures and Tribes semifinals	Provence	1–3	Quebec	Marseille, France
	De Santi 4'	[ Report]	Aoun 28'; Agourram 48'; Carrie 80'

28 June 2013 International Tournament of Peoples, Cultures and Tribes third-place play-off	Provence	0–1	Kurdistan Region	Marseille, France
		[ Report]

== Tournament records ==
=== VIVA World Cup record ===
VIVA World Cup
Year	Pos	GP	W	D	L	GS	GA
(Occitania) 2006	did not enter						
(Sápmi) 2008	5th	4	0	0	4	3	–18
(Padania) 2009	4th	4	2	0	2	9	–12
(Gozo) 2010	6th	3	0	0	3	3	–6
(Kurdistan Region) 2012	4th	4	2	0	2	23	–10
Total	4th place	5	4	0	11	38	–46
