= Maasai Football Federation =

- Founded: 2006
- President: Godfrey Ole Ntapatia

The Maasai Football Federation (MFF), also known as the Maasai Football Association, is the governing body of association football among the Maasai people of Kenya and Tanzania. Its headquarters are in Kiserian, Kenya.

Founded in 2006, the MFF became an associated member of the New Football Federations-Board in March the same year. Its current president is Godfrey Ole Ntapatia, with Solomon Kisemei Ntooki as its secretary-general.

The MFF controls the Maasai representative football team, which uses Talek Stadium as its home venue, which has yet to play any international match, or take part in a Viva World Cup. The team was set to take part in its 2008 edition, but was unable to do so for unknown reasons.
