= Occitania national football team =

Sports team of the European region of Occitania

Occitania
- Nickname: La Seleccion
- Association: Occitania Football Association
- Confederation: ConIFA
- Head coach: Didier Amiel
- Most caps: Boris Massaré (30)
- Top scorer: Mickael Bertini (12)
First colours	Second colours

First international
- Occitania 0–0 Monaco (Béziers, France; 12 February 2005)

Biggest win
- Occitania 14–0 Chechnya (Béziers, France; 3 September 2005)

Biggest defeat
- Occitania 0–7 Sápmi (Hyères, France; 15 April 2006)

VIVA World Cup
- Appearances: 4 (first in 2006)
- Best result: Third place (2006, 2010)

ConIFA Cup
- Appearances: 1 (first in 2014)
- Best result: Quarter-finals (2014)

Europeada
- Appearances: 4 (first in 2008)
- Best result: Runners-up (2016, 2024)

The Occitania football team (Occitan: Equip nacional de futbol d'Occitània) is the football team of Occitania, which is the name given to areas of southern France, westernmost Italy and a small valley in northern Spain where the Occitan language is spoken. It is controlled by the Associacion Occitania de Fotbol. As Occitania is not a recognised state it is neither a member of FIFA nor UEFA, and the team therefore is not eligible to enter either the World Cup or European Championship. They are members of the New Federations Board, and hosted the inaugural VIVA World Cup in November 2006 where they finished 3rd.

Since the Occitania team was established in 2004 they have played numerous friendly matches against sides such as Chechnya and Monaco as well as competing in 4 VIVA World Cup tournaments. In 2009 they finished 6th after their 5th-place match victory over Gozo was annulled, and a year later they completed their best-ever VIVA World Cup performance when they defeated Two Sicilies 2–0 to take 3rd-place. The Occitans were narrowly knocked out by hosts Iraqi Kurdistan national football team in the group stages of the 2012 VIVA World Cup, before eventually finished 5th.

They also participated in the ConIFA World Football Cup 2014 in Östersund, Sweden where they were unbeaten during the whole competition but losing in quarter finals on penalty against Arameans Suryoye football team. They finished at 7th place after beating Abkhazia national football team who won the ConIFA World Football Cup 2016 in Abkhazia.

Occitania also play in the Europeada, which is organised by the Federal Union of European Nationalities (FUEN). In the Europeada 2008 Occitania reached the quarter-finals, being eliminated by eventual tournament winner South Tyrol. The Occitans again reached the quarter-finals in the 2012 tournament and finished in 5th place. They finally reached the final, again against South Tyrol, in the 2016 tournament and lost after extra time, finishing 2nd out of 24 teams.

== Tournament records ==
=== World Cup record ===
Year	Round	Position	GP	W	D	L	GS	GA
VIVA World Cup
(Occitania) 2006	Third place	3rd	2	0	0	2	2	10
(Sápmi) 2008	did not enter							
(Padania) 2009	Quarterfinals	5th	3	1	0	2	2	6
(Gozo) 2010	Third place	3rd	4	2	0	2	9	3
(Kurdistan Region) 2012	Quarterfinals	5th	4	3	0	1	16	4
ConIFA World Football Cup
(Sápmi) 2014	Quarterfinals	7th	5	2	3	0	5	3
(Abkhazia) 2016	did not enter							
(Barawa) 2018	did not enter							
(North Macedonia) 2020	cancelled							
(Kurdistan Region) 2024	cancelled							
Total	Best: Third place		18	8	2	7	34	26

=== Europeada record ===
Year	Round	Position	GP	W	D	L	GS	GA
(Switzerland) 2008	Quarterfinal	5th	4	2	0	2	8	5
(Germany) 2012	Quarterfinal	5th	4	3	0	1	11	5
(Italy) 2016	Second place	2nd	6	5	0	1	13	5
(Denmark) (Germany) 2024	Second place	2nd	5	4	0	1	17	6
Total	Best: Second place		19	14	0	5	49	21

== Results and upcoming fixtures ==
Date	Venue			Score
6 Jul 2024	Europeada 2024 – Schleswig-Holstein	Occitania	Friuli	0-2
5 Jul 2024	Europeada 2024 – Region of Southern Denmark	Occitania	(Slovenia) Koroška	4-0
4 Jul 2024	Europeada 2024 – Schleswig-Holstein	Occitania	Slovaks in Hungary	5-4
2 Jul 2024	Europeada 2024 – Schleswig-Holstein	Occitania	North Frisia	1-0
1 Jul 2024	Europeada 2024 – Schleswig-Holstein	Occitania	(Italy) Cimbrians	7-0
25 Jun 2016	Europeada 2016 – South Tyrol	Occitania	South Tyrol	1–2 a.e.t.
24 Jun 2016	Europeada 2016 – South Tyrol	Occitania	Croats of Serbia	3–0
23 Jun 2016	Europeada 2016 – South Tyrol	Occitania	Felvidék	1–1 (4–2)
21 Jun 2016	Europeada 2016 – South Tyrol	Occitania	Danes of Germany	1–1
20 Jun 2016	Europeada 2016 – South Tyrol	Occitania	Slovaks in Hungary	4–1
19 Jun 2016	Europeada 2016 – South Tyrol	Occitania	Aromanians of Romania	4–1
30 Dec 2014	Toulouse	Occitania	Ellan Vannin	5–1
7 Jun 2014	2014 ConIFA World Football Cup – Östersund	Abkhazia	Occitania	0–1
5 Jun 2014	2014 ConIFA World Football Cup – Östersund	Kurdistan Region	Occitania	2–2 (5–4)
4 Jun 2014	2014 ConIFA World Football Cup – Östersund	Arameans Suryoye	Occitania	0–0 (7–6)
3 Jun 2014	2014 ConIFA World Football Cup – Östersund	Sápmi	Occitania	0–1
1 Jun 2014	2014 ConIFA World Football Cup – Östersund	Abkhazia	Occitania	1–1
28 Dec 2013	Lugo	Galicia	Occitania	1–7
7 July 2013	Tynwald Hill Tournament – Isle of Man	(Isle of Man) St Johns United A.F.C.	Occitania	0–2
6 July 2013	Tynwald Hill Tournament – Isle of Man	Tamil Eelam	Occitania	0–5
5 July 2013	Tynwald Hill Tournament – Isle of Man	Occitania	Sealand	8–0
21 Jun 2012	Europeada 2012 – Lusatia	Occitania	South Tyrol	0–3
19 Jun 2012	Europeada 2012 – Lusatia	Occitania	Danes of Germany	1–0
18 Jun 2012	Europeada 2012 – Lusatia	Occitania	(Italy) Cimbrians	5–0
17 Jun 2012	Europeada 2012 – Lusatia	Occitania	(Wales) Welsh	5–2
9 Jun 2012	2012 VIVA World Cup – Kurdistan	Occitania	Sahrawi Arab Democratic Republic	3–1
7 Jun 2012	2012 VIVA World Cup – Kurdistan	Occitania	Tamil Eelam	7–0
6 Jun 2012	2012 VIVA World Cup – Kurdistan	Kurdistan Region	Occitania	1–0
5 Jun 2012	2012 VIVA World Cup – Kurdistan	Occitania	Sahrawi Arab Democratic Republic	6–2
30 Mar 2012	Toulouse	Occitania	Sápmi	3–2
29 Dec 2011	Fontès	Occitania	(Campania) Cilento	2–0
28 May 2011	Olargues	Occitania	Romani people	11–2
5 Jun 2010	2010 VIVA World Cup – Gozo	Occitania	Two Sicilies	2–0
4 Jun 2010	2010 VIVA World Cup – Gozo	Occitania	Kurdistan Region	1–2
2 Jun 2010	2010 VIVA World Cup – Gozo	Occitania	Gozo	5–0
1 Jun 2010	2010 VIVA World Cup – Gozo	Occitania	Padania	0–1
3 Apr 2010	Saint-Dalmas-De-Tende	Occitania	Monaco	5–1
26 Jun 2009	2009 VIVA World Cup – Padania	Occitania	Gozo	2–1
23 Jun 2009	2009 VIVA World Cup – Padania	Occitania	Kurdistan Region	0–4
22 Jun 2009	2009 VIVA World Cup – Padania	Occitania	Padania	0–1
8 Nov 2008	Caraglio	Occitania	Monaco	2–2
5 Jun 2008	Europeada 2008 – Rhaetia	Occitania	South Tyrol	0–2
3 Jun 2008	Europeada 2008 – Rhaetia	Occitania	Croats of Romania	5–0
2 Jun 2008	Europeada 2008 – Rhaetia	Occitania	(Germany) Lusatia Sorbs	1–2
1 Jun 2008	Europeada 2008 – Rhaetia	Occitania	(Italy) Cimbrians	2–1
21 Nov 2006	2006 VIVA World Cup – Occitania	Occitania	Monaco	2–3
20 Nov 2006	2006 VIVA World Cup – Occitania	Occitania	Sápmi	0–7
17 Dec 2005	Monaco	Occitania	Monaco	1–2
3 Mar 2005	Occitania	Occitania	Chechnya	14–0
12 Feb 2005	Occitania	Occitania	Monaco	0–0

== Current squad ==
Squad for the 2014 ConIFA World Football Cup: link here

No.	Pos.	Player	Date of birth (age)	Caps	Goals	Club
	GK	Romain Ellien	20 December 1984	6	0	(Occitania Football Association) Olympique Girou FC
	GK	Lucas Orditz	22 April 1990	3	0	(Occitania Football Association) CA Béglais
	DF	Nicolas Dubois	27 April 1983	10	0	(Occitania Football Association) FC Pyramid Grande-Motte Littoral
	DF	Gerome Hernandez	10 April 1979	15	3	(Occitania Football Association) FC Portiragnes
	DF	Christophe Dalzon	15 April 1983	10	0	(Occitania Football Association) AS Fabrègues
	DF	Vivian Dors	9 October 1978	8	2	(Occitania Football Association) ES Paulhan-Pézenas
	DF	Joel Congré	28 September 1987	6	0	(Occitania Football Association) Toulouse St Jo
	DF	Sebastien Picard	6 January 1982	10	1	(Occitania Football Association) AS Bages Football
	MF	Renaud Thomas	1 February 1980	15	2	(Occitania Football Association) US Le Pontet
	MF	Amiel Jordan	31 March 1983	29	4	(Occitania Football Association) FC Portiragnes
	MF	Nabil Moussi	4 March 1988	6	0	(Occitania Football Association) Toulouse AC
	MF	Ronald Rodas	26 October 1976	10	2	(Occitania Football Association) Toulouse OAC
	MF	Brice Martinez	3 June 1989	10	5	(Occitania Football Association) AS Puissalicon Magalas
	MF	Bastien Cantier	19 January 1988	10	2	(Occitania Football Association) AS Montarnaud
	MF	Giovanni Giraudo	17 January 1994	3	0	(Occitania Football Association) A.C.D. Pro Dronero
	MF	Boris Massaré	26 June 1986	25	8	(Danish Football Association) Brabrand IF
	FW	Guillaume Lafuente	11 February 1983	20	9	(Occitania Football Association) AS Fabregues
	FW	Simon Delpech	21 February 1989	7	4	(Occitania Football Association) Auch Football
	FW	Pierre Bru	27 April 1984	10	4	(Occitania Football Association) AS Canet
	FW	Christophe Macia	28 October 1987	3	0	(Occitania Football Association) AS Montarnaud

== Honours ==
=== Non-FIFA competitions ===
- Viva World Cup
  - Third place (2): 2006, 2010
- Europeada
  - Runners-up (2): 2016, 2024
