= Darfur national football team =

Association football team in Sudan

Darfur
- Nickname: Darfur United
- Association: Darfur Football Association
- Confederation: World Unity Football Alliance (WUFA)
- Head coach: Mark Hodson
- Most caps: Moubarak Haggar Duogom (7)
- Top scorer: Moubarak Haggar Duogom; Khalid Abdulkhalik (1)
First colours	Second colours

First international
- Northern Cyprus 15–0 Darfur (Arbil, Iraq; 4 June 2012)

Biggest defeat
- Darfur 0–20 Padania (Östersund, Sweden; 1 June 2014)

Viva World Cup
- Appearances: 1 (first in 2012)
- Best result: 9th (2012)

ConIFA World Football Cup
- Appearances: 1 (first in 2014)
- Best result: 12th (2014)

The Darfur representative football team, also called Darfur United, is an association football team representing Darfur, a region in western Sudan. Their players all live in refugee camps in neighbouring Chad. They have competed in the 2012 VIVA World Cup and the 2014 ConIFA World Football Cup.

== Overview ==
Darfur United was formed in March 2012 with representatives from twelve Darfuri refugee camps located in Chad, invited to try out for the Darfur United team. 16 players were initially selected with four players also offered roster spots in the case of the need to replace any players. The team participated in the 2012 Viva World Cup, which was hosted by Kurdistan Iraq in June.

The operational aspects of this football team have been overseen and orchestrated by i-ACT, a humanitarian group located in Los Angeles, California, and directed by Gabriel Stauring and his team of volunteers.

The team's head coach is Mark Hodson of EVO Soccer Programs and formerly the Sand and Surf Soccer Club, based in Manhattan Beach, CA. Hodson is an NSCAA Premier License holder and has been a professional coach since 1999.

Ben Holden of Bradford, UK, became the team's assistant coach in May 2012 to help manage the team at the 2012 Viva World Cup in Iraq/Kurdistan. The 27-year-old worked as a coach in Los Angeles in 2006 for a year; head coach Mark Hodson (whom he met whilst coaching in the US) called him and asked him how he felt about assisting him coaching Darfur United in June's Viva World Cup 2012.

The 16 players who made up Darfur United’s squad were all former Sudanese refugees who, having escaped the war-torn area, got the chance to represent Darfur abroad in a global competition.

== 2012 VIVA World Cup ==
After Darfur lost the two Group Matches against Northern Cyprus (0–15) and Provence (0–18) in Group C, they had to play a Qualification Match for the 5th to 8th Place Semi Finals. As the Darfuri team lost the match against Western Sahara 1–5, they ranked 9th and last in their first international competition. Moubarak Haggar Dougom scored the first goal ever for Darfur in the 46th minute.

== 2014 ConIFA World Football Cup ==
Darfur competed in the 2014 ConIFA World Football Cup, losing all their matches and winning the fair play award.

== World Cup record ==
VIVA World Cup
Year	Round	Position	GP	W	D	L	GS	GA
(Occitania) 2006	did not enter							
(Sápmi) 2008	did not enter							
(Padania) 2009	did not enter							
(Gozo) 2010	did not enter							
(Kurdistan Region) 2012	Group stage	9th	3	0	0	3	1	38
ConIFA World Football Cup
(Sápmi) 2014	Group stage	12th	4	0	0	4	0	61
(Abkhazia) 2016	did not enter							
(Barawa) 2018	did not enter							
(North Macedonia) 2020	did not enter							
Total			7	0	0	7	1	99

Year	Round	Score	Result
VIVA World Cup History
2012
2012	Round 1	Darfur 0–15 Northern Cyprus	Lose
2012	Round 1	Darfur 0–18 Provence	Lose
2012	8th place	Darfur 1–5 Sahrawi Arab Democratic Republic	Lose
ConIFA World Football Cup History
2014
2014	Round 1	Darfur 0–20 Padania	Lose
2014	Round 1	Darfur 0–19 South Ossetia	Lose
2014	Placement Round 1	Darfur 0–12 Artsakh	Lose
2014	Placement Round 2	Darfur 0–10 Tamil Eelam	Lose

== Notable players ==
- (Darfur) Khalid Abdulkhalik - national team top scorer and played for University of the Southwest (United States)
