= Sahrawi Football Federation =

Association football governing body in Western Sahara

WUFA
- Founded: 1989
- Headquarters: Sahrawi refugee camps
- WUFA affiliation: 2020

The Sahrawi Football Federation (FSF) (Arabic: الاتحاد الصحراوي لكرة القدم, Spanish: Federación Saharaui de Fútbol) is the governing body of association football in Western Sahara, a territory that is disputed between Morocco and the Sahrawi Arab Democratic Republic and under Moroccan occupation. It was formed in 1989 and it is based in the Sahrawi refugee camp of Bojador. The board runs the Sahrawi national football team. The Sahrawi Football Federation hosts the Sahrawi Republic Cup.

== International affiliation ==
Old logo.

The Sahrawi Football Federation is not affiliated to the Confederation of African Football (CAF) nor to FIFA. In December 2003 the Sahrawi Football Federation became provisionally affiliated to the N.F.-Board. The N.F.-Board (officially known as the New Football Federations-Board) was formed in December 2003 and acted as a federation of association football national federations, who were not recognised by FIFA. The board also organised the Viva World Cup, a competition Western Sahara entered once. On 25 March 2012, the then Sahrawi Arab Democratic Republic Minister for Youth and Sports, Mohamed Moulud Mohamed Fade, announced the creation of the Sahrawi national football team, by decision of the own team players, stating that, "The reason behind its absence of the African football competitions is due to its non-membership in the Confederation of African Football."

The national team participated in the 2012 Viva World Cup. Due to pressure from Morocco, the hosts of the tournament, Kurdistan did not display the Sahrawi flag for the competition. The N.F. Board disbanded In January 2013 and it was replaced by the Confederation of Independent Football Associations (ConIFA). Western Sahara joined ConIFA, but the national team has not participated in any of the ConIFA World Football Cups organised by the organisation. In July 2020, Western Sahara were founding members of the World Unity Football Alliance.

Sahrawi Football Federation membership was rejected by CAF in 2023.
