= 2009 Viva World Cup =

Tournament details
- Host country: Padania
- Dates: 22–27 June
- Teams: 6 (from 1 confederation)
- Venue: 4 (in 4 host cities)

Final positions
- Champions: Padania (2nd title)
- Runners-up: Kurdistan Region
- Third place: Sápmi

Tournament statistics
- Matches played: 11
- Goals scored: 47 (4.27 per match)
- Top scorer(s): (Sápmi) Svein Thomassen (Provence) Enais Hammoud (5 goals)

The 2009 Viva World Cup was the third Viva World Cup, an international tournament for football open to non-FIFA-affiliated teams, played in Padania.

Three venues were bidding to host the tournament in 2010, being in Padania, Kurdistan and Gozo. At the NF-Board general meeting in Milan (Italy) on 13 December 2008, it was decided to hold the Viva World Cup annually. The 2010 edition was to be played in Gozo and priority was given to Iraqi Kurdistan to host the 2011 tournament.

Occitania originally finished 5th, but having made one more substitution than allowed, the result was overturned, leaving Gozo as the winners of the 5th place playoff.

The defending champions from the previous tournament were Padania, who went on to win the tournament.

== Participating teams ==
Team	2009 Pos.	Participation
Padania	1st	2nd
Kurdistan Region	2nd	2nd
Sápmi	3rd	3rd
Provence	4th	2nd
Occitania	5th	2nd
Gozo	6th	1st

== Squads ==
For a list of all squads that appeared in the final tournament, see 2009 VIVA World Cup squads.

== Venues ==
City	Stadium	Capacity	Event
Varese	Stadio Franco Ossola	9,926	Opening Ceremony
Brescia	Stadio Mario Rigamonti	16,308	
Novara	Stadio Silvio Piola	7,487	
Verona	Stadio Marcantonio Bentegodi	44,799	Final Match

== Group stage ==
=== Group A ===
Team	Pld	W	D	L	GF	GA	GD	Pts
Padania	2	2	0	0	3	1	+2	6
Kurdistan Region	2	1	0	1	5	2	+3	3
Occitania	2	0	0	2	0	5	–5	0

22 June 2009
21:00 CET

Padania	1–0	Occitania
Piovani 83'	(Report)

Stadio Silvio Piola, Novara
Attendance: 1100
Referee: Mazzoleni

23 June 2009
21:00 CET

Occitania	0–4	Kurdistan Region
	(Report)	Aziz 3'; Abdullah 38', 45'; Sediq 56'

Stadio Franco Ossola, Varese
Attendance: 350
Referee: Anders

24 June 2009
21:00 CET

Padania	2–1	Kurdistan Region
Ferrari 4'; Ganz 67' (pen.)	(Report)	Qaraman 62'

Stadio Mario Rigamonti, Brescia
Attendance: 1000
Referee: Copia

=== Group B ===
Team	Pld	W	D	L	GF	GA	GD	Pts
Provence	2	2	0	0	5	2	+3	6
Sápmi	2	1	0	1	8	4	+4	3
Gozo	2	0	0	2	3	10	–7	0

22 June 2009
17:00 CET

Provence	3–1	Gozo
Hammoud 36', 77'; Hammami 90+1'	(Report)	Camilleri 73'

Stadio Silvio Piola, Novara
Attendance: 100
Referee: Buonanno

23 June 2009
17:00 CET

Sápmi	1–2	Provence
Bertelsen 5'	(Report)	Hammoud 37'; Hammami 64' (pen.)

Stadio Franco Ossola, Varese
Attendance: 50
Referee: Iodice

24 June 2009
17:00 CET

Sápmi	7–2	Gozo
Thomassen 12', 16', 17'; Eira 48'; Reginiussen 52', 84'; Bruer 78'	(Report)	Bugeja 79', 86'

Stadio Mario Rigamonti, Brescia
Attendance: 80
Referee: Seerwand

== Knockout stage ==
Semi-finals
25 June – Varese
Provence	0
Kurdistan Region	6
25 June – Varese
Padania	4
Sápmi	0

Final
27 June – Verona
Kurdistan Region	0
Padania	2
Third place
26 June – Brescia
Provence	4 (4)
Sápmi	4 (5)

=== Semi-finals ===
25 June 2009
17:00 CET

Provence	0–6	Kurdistan Region
	(Report)	Aziz 6'; Sediq 16'; Qadir 25'; Abdullah 56', 80'; Abdulrida 71'

Stadio Franco Ossola, Varese
Attendance: 250
Referee: Modesti

25 June 2009
21:00 CET

Padania	4–0	Sápmi
Pedersoli 12'; Battaglino 38'; Hætta 41' (o.g.); Ligarotti 85'	(Report)

Stadio Franco Ossola, Varese
Attendance: 1560
Referee: Casnati

=== 5th-place match ===
26 June 2009
17:00 CET

Occitania	2–1	Gozo
Ballue 19'; Cantier 62'	(Report)	Camilleri 80'

Stadio Mario Rigamonti, Brescia

=== 3rd-place match ===
26 June 2009
21:00 CET

Provence	4–4	Sápmi
Hammoud 14', 88'; Matel 16'; Bennattar 21'	(Report)	Thomassen 13', 53' (pen.); Bruer 18'; Reginiussen 82'
Penalties
	4–5

Stadio Mario Rigamonti, Brescia

=== Final ===
27 June 2009
17:00 CET

Padania	2–0	Kurdistan Region
D'Alessandro 73'; Casse 74'	(Report)

Stadio Marcantonio Bentegodi, Verona
Attendance: 4000

Viva World Cup 2009 winners

Padania
Second title

== Goalscorers ==
5 goals

- (Sápmi) Svein Thomassen
- (Provence) Enais Hammoud

4 goals

- (Kurdistan Region) Karzan Abdullah

== See also ==
- ELF Cup
- UNPO Cup
- FIFI Wild Cup
- KTFF 50th Anniversary Cup
- Nouvelle Fédération-Board
