= MFF =

MFF may refer to:

== Events ==
- Maryland Film Festival, Baltimore, US
- Midwest FurFest, a furry convention in Illinois, US
- Milan Film Festival, a film festival in Milan, Italy
- Montclair Film Festival, Montclair, New Jersey, US

== Organisations and companies ==
- Faculty of Mathematics and Physics, Charles University (Czech: Matematicko-fyzikální fakulta Univerzity Karlovy), Prague, Czech Republic
- Manly Fast Ferry, ferry operator in Sydney, Australia
- Minnesota Freedom Fund, a non-profit for bail fund in the US
- Molecular Frontiers Foundation, a non-profit chemistry organization, Sweden

=== Football ===
- Malmö FF, a Swedish football club
- Monégasque Football Federation, governs football in Monaco
- Mongolian Football Federation, governs football in Mongolia
- Myanmar Football Federation, governs football in Myanmar
- Maasai Football Federation, governs football for the Maasai people

== Science and technology ==
- Mitochondrial fission factor, a protein encoded by the gene MFF
- MFF SIM, SIM cards for machine use

== Other uses ==
- Minffordd railway station (station code), Wales
- Military free-fall, in parachuting
  - Military Freefall Parachutist Badge, a badge of the U.S. Army
- Multiannual Financial Framework, a budget plan of the European Union
- Music, Fashion, Film, 2026 album by Charli xcx

== See also ==
- MAC-Forced Forwarding (MACFF), a networking technology
