= Herdi Siamand =

Iraqi footballer

Hardi Siamand
Personal information
- Full name: Hardi Siamand Tahir
- Date of birth: 13 January 1983 (age 43)
- Position: Centre-back

Team information
- Current team: Erbil SC
- Number: 14

Senior career*
| Years | Team | Apps | (Gls) |
| 2006–2010 | Pires | | |
| 2010–2012 | Zakho | | |
| 2012–2016 | Erbil | 86 | (5) |
| 2016–2018 | Al-Mina'a | 60 | (1) |
| 2018– | Erbil | 73 | (3) |

International career^{‡}
| 2016 | Iraq | 1 | (0) |
| 2012– | Kurdistan | 11 | (1) |
- * Club domestic league appearances and goals as of 12 June 2018 ‡ National team caps and goals as of 18 March 2016

Herdi Siamand (born 13 January 1983) is an Iraqi professional footballer who currently plays for Al-Mina'a in the Iraqi Premier League.

== International debut ==
On March 18, 2016 Herdi made his first international cap with Iraq against Syria in a friendly match.

== International goals ==
Scores and results list Kurdistan goal tally first, score column indicates score after each Siamand goal

List of international goals scored by Herdi Siamand
| No. | Date | Venue | Opponent | Score | Result | Competition |
|---|---|---|---|---|---|---|
| 1 | 9 June 2012 | Franso Hariri Stadium, Erbil, Kurdistan Region | Northern Cyprus | 2–0 | 2–1 | 2012 Viva World Cup |
