= Halgurd Mulla Mohammed =

Iraqi footballer

Personal information
- Full name: Halgurd Mulla Mohammed Taher
- Date of birth: 11 March 1988 (age 38)
- Place of birth: Mosul, Iraq
- Height: 1.70 m (5 ft 7 in)
- Positions: Left winger; second striker

Senior career*
Years	Team	Apps	(Gls)
2005–2009	Sulaymaniyah FC		
2009–2015	Erbil SC		
2015–2016	Naft Al-Wasat		
2016–2018	Al-Quwa Al-Jawiya		

International career^{‡}
2008–2012	Iraqi Kurdistan	9	(5)
2008–2009	Iraq U23	3	(1)
2007–2013	Iraq	10	(0)
- * Club domestic league appearances and goals as of n/a ‡ National team caps and goals as of June 18, 2014

Halgurd Mulla Mohammed Taher Zebari (Kurdish: هەلگورد مەلا محەمەد تاهر زێبارى; born 11 March 1988) is a former Iraqi football player of Kurdish ethnicity who last played as a left winger for Al-Quwa Al-Jawiya in Iraq. His older brother Hawar Mulla Mohammed is also a retired Iraqi national team player and former teammates at club level.

== Career ==
Born in Mosul in March 1988, he started his playing career with local club Sulaymaniyah FC in 2004. With his brother an integral part of the Iraqi Olympic side and national senior team, Halkard thrived at club level, spending his first two years establishing his place as one of the nation's burgeoning stars.

He was first thrust into the international arena in the 2006 AFC Youth Championship, when he played in all four of Iraq's matches and was on target in the 2–2 draw against Saudi Arabia. After going on to feature in Iraq's failed qualifying campaign for the Olympic Football Tournament Beijing 2008, Mohammed made his senior debut in a friendly 1–1 against Jordan.

== National teams ==
=== Iraq Youth team ===
Halgurd was part of the Iraqi squad at the AFC Youth Championship 2006, he played four games and scored one goal at the 2–2 draw with Saudi Arabia.

=== Iraq Olympic team ===
Halgurd was part with Iraq Olympic team in the Football at the 2008 Summer Olympics - Men's qualification campaign, he played several matches and helped Iraq to reach the final qualification stages.

=== Iraq national team debut ===
In 2007 Halgurd made his debut in a friendly match against Jordan and the match ended 1-1.

=== VIVA World Cup and Iraqi Kurdistan regional team ===
In 2008 Halgurd took part in the 2008 VIVA World Cup with Iraqi Kurdistan and scored Iraqi Kurdistan's 2nd goal against Sapmi football team in the first match of the tournament, the match ended 2-2. In the second match against Provence, where Kurdistan won 3-0, Halgurd scored a brace. Kurdistan went on to win the VIVA World Cup for the first time in their history, beating North Cyprus 2-1, with Halgurd scoring the first goal of the match by a calm finish from the penalty spot.

== Honours ==
Erbil

- Iraqi Premier League: 2011–12; runner-up: 2010–11, 2012–13
- AFC Cup runner-up: 2012, 2013

Al Quwa Al Jawiya

- AFC Cup: 2016
