= Europeada =

European football competition

The Europeada is a football tournament for indigenous and national minorities in Europe, and is organized by the Federal Union of European Nationalities. The first edition was played in 2008 in Surselva, Switzerland. The edition 2024 took place parallel to the 2024 European Football Championship in the German-Danish border region in northern and southern Schleswig.

== Men's winners ==
Ed.	Year	Host	First place game			Third place game			Num. teams
Ed.	Year	Host	(gold) Champion	Score	(silver) Runner-up	(bronze) Third	Score	Fourth	Num. teams
1	2008	Switzerland	South Tyrol	1–0	Croatians from Serbia	Roma from Hungary	9–0	Danish minority of Southern Schleswig	17
2	2012	Germany	South Tyrol	3–1	Roma from Hungary	Croatians from Serbia	1–0	Carinthian Slovenes	20
3	2016	Italy	South Tyrol	2–1	Occitania	Carinthian Slovenes	2–0	Upper Hungary	24
4	2022	Austria	South Tyrol	1–0	Carinthian Slovenes	Sorbs & German minority in Poland			20
5	2024	Denmark/ Germany	Friûl	2–0	Occitania	Carinthian Slovenes & Southern Schleswig			20
6	2028	Italy							

== Women's winners ==
Ed.	Year	Host	First place game			Third place game			Num. teams
Ed.	Year	Host	(gold) Champion	Score	(silver) Runner-up	(bronze) Third	Score	Fourth	Num. teams
1	2016	Italy	South Tyrol	3–2	Occitania	Russians in Germany	0–0 (tab: 3-2)	Ladin	6
2	2022	Austria	Carinthian Slovenes	0–0 (tab: 4-2)	South Tyrol	Ladin	3–0	Romansh League	4
3	2024	Denmark/ Germany	South Tyrol	11–1	Nord-Fraschlönj	Southern Schleswig	2–2 (tab: 5–4)	Carinthian Slovenes	9
4	2028	Italy							
