= Emanuele Ferrari =

Italian fashion photographer

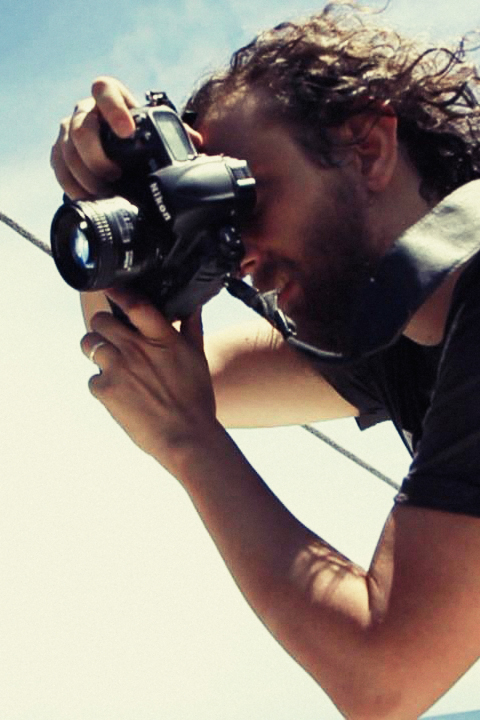
- Born: October 6, 1975 (age 50); Milan, Italy
- Occupation: Photographer
- Years active: 2010–present
- Style: Natural beauty, fashion, editorial
- Website: http://www.emanueleferrari.it

Emanuele Ferrari (born October 6, 1975, in Milan, Italy) is an Italian fashion photographer.

== Early life ==
Born in Milan in 1975, Emanuele has worked in the professional photography world for about ten years. He has collaborated with several famous brands and boasts publications in international magazines. The only Italian – for two years in a row – included among the top 20 most influential international photographers of the web according to the WIP index (Web Popolarity Index). He is recognised for his simple, irreverent, and never-banal style.

== Work ==
He has created advertising campaigns and editorials for the brands Diesel, Etam, Twin Set, Tezenis, Krizia, Moschino, LIU JO, Sony Italy, Nike, Coca-Cola, Fila, Calzedonia, Fendi, Zalando, Marc Jacobs, and MAC Cosmetics. Over the years, he worked for magazines such as El País Icon, Purple, i-D, Vogue, Cosmopolitan, Nylon, la Repubblica, Rolling Stone, and Vanity Fair. He is represented by ART PARTNER Licensing.

He was a selected client for: Diesel, Etam, Twin Set, Tezenis, Krizia, Moschino, LIU JO, Sony Italy, Nike, Coca-Cola, Fila, Calzedonia, Fendi, Zalando, Marc Jacobs, MAC Cosmetics, Vogue, Cosmopolitan, Nylon, Ia Repubblica, Rolling Stone, Vanity Fair, i-D, Purple, and El País.

== Publications ==
Choice of publications:

- i-D
- Vogue
- Nylon
- Rolling Stone
- Purple
- Vanity Fair
- Cosmopolitan
- Ia Repubblica
- El Pais
