= Kurdistan Region national football team =

Kurdistan National Football Team

Kurdistan
- Nickname: The Tricolour
- Association: Kurdistan Football Association
- Confederation: ConIFA
- Head coach: Khasraw Groon
- Most caps: Heydar Gharaman
- Home stadium: Franso Hariri Stadium; Zakho International Stadium
First colours	Second colours

First international
- Kurdistan Region 2–2 Sápmi (Gällivare, Sweden; 7 July 2008)

Biggest win
- Tamil Eelam 0–9 Kurdistan Region (Östersund, Sweden; 1 June 2014)

Biggest defeat
- Chameria 6–0 Kurdistan Region (The Hague, Netherlands; 17 June 2017)

VIVA World Cup
- Appearances: 3 (first in 2008)
- Best result: Champions, 2012

The Kurdistan national football team (Kurdish: هەڵبژاردەی نیشتمانی تۆپی پێی کوردستان romanized : jêgrtîya welatî ya tepapê ya Kurdistan ê) is the national team of the Kurdistan Region. They are not affiliated with FIFA or Asian Football Confederation (AFC).

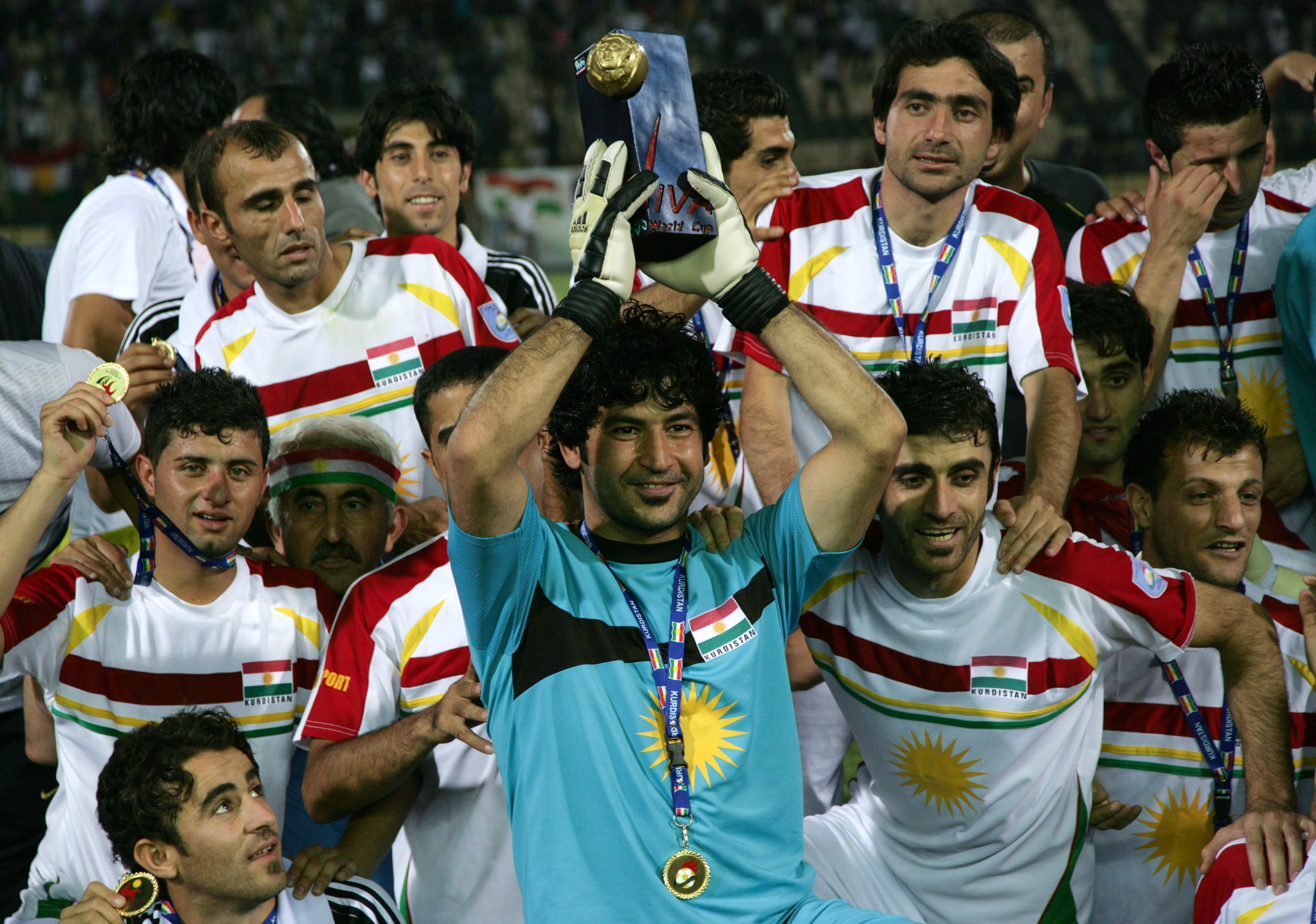
The Kurdistan National Football after winning the 2012 Viva World Cup

== History ==
Although Kurdistan is not a member of FIFA or the AFC, Kurdistan has participated various international football tournaments.

The Iraq Football Association (IFA) attended a meeting held by the N.F.-Board in June 2006. In December 2008, during the 5th General Meeting, Kurdistan was granted full membership to the N.F.-Board and their tournaments. The team played in the 2008 VIVA World Cup for the first time, finishing in the fourth place after a 3–1 loss to Sápmi. Their first and only win in the 2008 tournament came against Provence.

In 2011 the Kurdish team took part the Palestine International Cup and defeated Mauritania and Tunisia U22. Kurdistan eventually became champions on home turf in the 2012 Viva World Cup, defeating Northern Cyprus 2–1 in front of 22,000 fans.

On 9 September 2024, it was announced that Kurdistan had been suspended by CONIFA.

== Official Kurdistan FA Emblem ==
The Kurdistan Region FA emblem was designed by Kurdish artist Rawand Sirwan Nawroly (Kurdish: ره‌وه‌ند سیروان نه‌ورڕۆڵی). The emblem represents the Kurdish flag colours, where the red represents the Kurdish Newroz fire. The yellow ball represents the Kurdish Sun and the green banner represents the green Kurdistan scenery.

== Competitive record ==
Year	Position	GP	W	D	L	GS	GA
VIVA World Cup
(Occitania) 2006	did not enter						
(Sápmi) 2008	4th	5	1	2	2	7	7
(Padania) 2009	2nd	4	2	0	2	11	4
(Gozo) 2010	2nd	4	3	0	1	9	5
(Kurdistan Region) 2012	1st	4	4	0	0	11	2
Palestine International Cup
(Palestine) 2012	3rd	3	1	1	1	5	4
International Tournament of Peoples, Cultures and Tribes
2013	1st	4	3	1	0	9	1
ConIFA World Football Cup
(Sápmi) 2014	6th	5	1	3	1	14	6
(Abkhazia) 2016	8th	5	2	3	0	9	3
(Barawa) 2018	did not enter						
(North Macedonia) 2020	Canceled due to the COVID-19 pandemic						
(Kurdistan Region) 2024	Canceled due to security concerns						
Total	Best: 1st	33	18	8	7	73	28

World Cup History
Year	Round	Score	Result
VIVA World Cup
2008	Round 1	Kurdistan Region 2–2 Sápmi	Draw
2008	Round 1	Kurdistan Region 3–0 Provence	Win
2008	Round 1	Kurdistan Region 1–2 Padania	Lose
2008	Round 1	Kurdistan Region 0–0 Arameans Suryoye	Draw
2008	3rd Place	Kurdistan Region 1–3 Sápmi	Lose
2009	Round 1	Kurdistan Region 4–0 Occitania	Win
2009	Round 1	Kurdistan Region 1–2 Padania	Lose
2009	Semi-Final	Kurdistan Region 6–0 Provence	Win
2009	Final	Kurdistan Region 0–2 Padania	Lose
2010	Round 1	Kurdistan Region 4–1 Two Sicilies	Win
2010	Round 1	Kurdistan Region 3–2 Provence	Win
2010	Semi-Final	Kurdistan Region 2–1 Occitania	Win
2010	Final	Kurdistan Region 0–1 Padania	Lose
2012
2012	Round 1	Kurdistan Region 6–0 Sahrawi Arab Democratic Republic	Win
2012	Round 1	Kurdistan Region 1–0 Occitania	Win
2012	Semi-Final	Kurdistan Region 2–1 Provence	Win
2012	Final	Kurdistan Region 2–1 Northern Cyprus	Win
ConIFA World Football Cup
2014	Round 1	Kurdistan Region 1–2 Arameans Suryoye	Lose
2014	Round 1	Kurdistan Region 9–0 Tamil Eelam	Win
2014	Quarter-finals	Kurdistan Region 1 (2) – (4) 1 Ellan Vannin	Draw
2014	Placement Round 1	Kurdistan Region 2 (5) – (4) 2 Occitania	Draw
2014	Placement Round 2	Kurdistan Region 1 (3) – (4) 1 Padania	Draw
2016	Round 1	Kurdistan Region 3–0 Székely Land	Win
2016	Round 2	Kurdistan Region 3–0 United Koreans in Japan	Win
2016	Quarter-finals	Kurdistan Region 2 (6) – (7) 2 Padania	Draw
2016	Placement Round 1	Kurdistan Region 0 (5) – (6) 0 Western Armenia	Draw
2016	Placement Round 2	Kurdistan Region 1 (2) – (4) 1 United Koreans in Japan	Draw

Others tournaments
Year	Round	Score	Result
Palestine International Cup
2012	Round 1	Kurdistan Region 3–1 Mauritania	Win
2012	Round 2	Kurdistan Region 1–1 Indonesia	Draw
2012	Round 3	Kurdistan Region 1–2 Tunisia	Lose
International Tournament of Peoples, Cultures and Tribes
2013	Round 1	Kurdistan Region 1–1 UGA Ardeiv	Draw
2013	Round 2	Kurdistan Region 6–0 Sahrawi Arab Democratic Republic	Win
2013	Semi final	Kurdistan Region 1–0 Quebec	Win
2013	Final	Kurdistan Region 1–0 Provence	Win

== Current squad ==
As 2016:

No.	Pos.	Player	Date of birth (age)	Caps	Goals	Club
1	GK	Sarhang Muhsin	29	22	0	(Iraq Football Association) Al-Shorta
12	GK	Znar Faizi		0	0	(Kurdistan Region Football Association) Duhok
22	GK	Rebaz Abdulla	21	0	0	(Kurdistan Region Football Association) Erbil
2	DF	Bayar Abubakir		5	0	(Kurdistan Region Football Association) Duhok
3	DF	Herdi Siamand	33	11	1	(Kurdistan Region Football Association) Erbil
20	DF	Jassim Mohammed Haji	32	10	1	(Kurdistan Region Football Association) Zakho
13	DF	Aras Mustafa	28	1	0	(Kurdistan Region Football Association) Zeravani
4	DF	Hawkar Latif	26	0	0	(Kurdistan Region Football Association) Newroz
8	DF	Khalid Mushir	35	12	2	(Kurdistan Region Football Association) Zakho
5	DF	Kamaran Ali	27	3	0	(Kurdistan Region Football Association) Zakho
21	DF	Niaz Muhamad	26	5	0	(Kurdistan Region Football Association) Erbil
14	MF	Hawre Jalal	26	3	5	(Kurdistan Region Football Association) Peshmerga Hawler
15	MF	Muhamad Sabir		1	0	(Kurdistan Region Football Association) Erbil
19	MF	Diyar Rahman	30	5	1	(Kurdistan Region Football Association) Erbil
10	MF	Ali Aziz	27	10	4	(Kurdistan Region Football Association) Ararat
16	MF	Ahmet Isik	19	12	19	(German Football Association) Arminia Tegel
6	MF	Abdulla Kaifi	24	0	0	(Iraq Football Association) Kirkuk
11	MF	Kosrat Baiz	25	5	2	(Kurdistan Region Football Association) Erbil
9	MF	Rekar Hashim	23	1	0	(Kurdistan Region Football Association) Erbil
17	FW	Hunar Ahmad		4	2	(Kurdistan Region Football Association) Zeravani
18	FW	Ayub Ayad	31	1	0	(Kurdistan Region Football Association) Zeravani
7	FW	Farhang Wriya		2	1	(Kurdistan Region Football Association) Peshmerga Hawler

== Managers ==
Manager	Period	Played	Won	Drawn	Lost	Win %
(Iraq) (Kurdistan Region) Abdullah Mahmoud	2008–2016	29	15	7	7	51.72
(Iraq) (Kurdistan Region) Khasraw Groon	2016–present	11	6	4	1	54.54
Totals		40	21	11	8	52.50

== Honours ==
=== Non-FIFA competitions ===
- Viva World Cup
  - Champions (1): 2012
  - Runners-up (2): 2009, 2010
