= Esperanto football team =

Esperanto
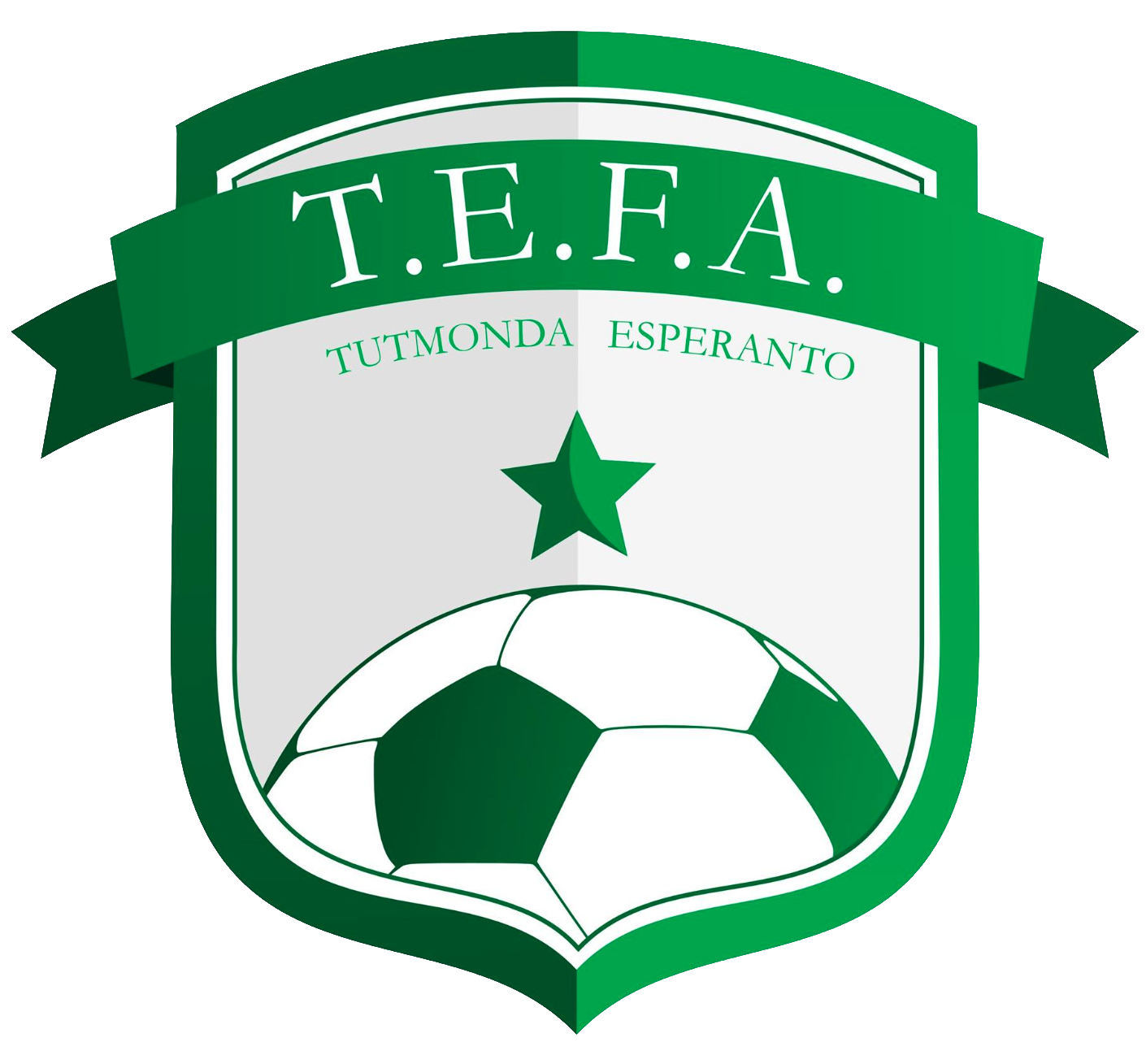
- Association: Tutmonda Esperanto Futbola Asocio
- Confederation: COSANFF
- Head coach: Jorge Montanari
- Top scorer: Alejandro Demasi (2)
First colours

First international
- Esperanto 3–8 Armenian Argentine Community (Buenos Aires, Argentina; 31 July 2014)

Biggest win
- None

Biggest defeat
- Mapuche 8–1 Esperanto (Linares, Chile, 15 April 2017)

CSANF Cup
- Appearances: 1 (first in 2014)
- Best result: Runners-up (2014)

The Esperanto football team (Esperanto: Esperanta nacia futbala teamo) is a football team representing Esperanto speakers worldwide. The team is a member of the South American Board of New Football Federations and the N.F.-Board.

== History ==
The Esperanto national football team was founded in 2014.

== International results ==
Esperanto's score is shown first in each case.

Esperanto national football team results
No.	Date	Venue	Opponents	Score	Competition	Esperanto scorers	Att.	Ref.
1	31 July 2014	Polideportivo Colegiales, Buenos Aires (N)	Armenian Argentine Community	3–8	2014 COSANFF Cup	Demasi (2), Bohórquez	—	
2	31 July 2015	Stadium Lille Métropole, Villeneuve-d'Ascq (N)	Western Sahara	0–4	2015 Zamenhof Cup		—	
3	15 April 2017	Estadio Fiscal de Linares, Linares (A)	Mapuche	1–8	Friendly	Unknown	—	
