= Sahrawi Republic Cup =

- Founded: 2016; 10 years ago
- Region: Western Sahara
- Teams: 8
- Current champions: Ittihad El Aaiun (2st title)
- Most championships: Ittihad El Aaiun (2 titles)

The Sahrawi Republic Cup (Arabic: كأس الجمهورية الصحراوية; Spanish: Copa de la República Saharaui) is a football tournament played by teams from Sahrawi Arab Democratic Republic and organised by the Sahrawi Football Federation. The tournament was established in 2016 and is held annually in the Algerian city of Tindouf, where the exiled government of the Polisario Front is based. The participating teams are usually clubs based in the Sahrawi refugee camps.

The competition was run four times between 2016 and 2019. It was won once each by Chahid Mahfoud El Welad Smara, Fariq Dakhla, Ittihad El Aaiun and Wifaq Bir Lehlou.

== History ==
The competition was first contested in 2016. Farik Dakhla played Wifaq Bir Lehlou in the final. The match ended in a 2–2 and a penalty shoot-out was held to determine the winners. Farik Dakhla won the shootout 5–4 to win the inaugural edition.

The following year saw runners-up Wifaq Bir Lehlou reach the final again. This time they would play Ittihad El Aaiun. The match finished as a 1–1 draw so a penalty shoot-out was again required to determine the winner. Ittihad El Aaiun won the shootout 5–4 to win the cup for the first time.

In 2018, the third edition of the competition saw two-time runners-up Wifaq Bir Lehlou reach the final for the third successive season. This time they faced 27th of February Boujdour, who had defeated defending champions Ittihad El Aaiun in the quarter-finals. Goals from Madalah and Aman helped Wifaq Bir Lehlou to a 2–0 win as they won the tournament for the first time.

The 2019 edition of the tournament saw Farik Dakhla reach the final for the first time in three years. They faced Chahid Mahfoud El Welad Smara in the final. The match resulted in a 1–1 draw so, for the third time in four editions, a penalty shoot-out was required to determine the winner. Farik Dakhla did not repeat their performance from 2016 and Chahid Mahfoud El Welad Smara triumphed 4–2 in the shoot-out to win the tournament for the first time.

== Winners ==
Year	Winner	Score	Runner-up
2016	Fariq Dakhla	2–2 (5–4p)	Wifaq Bir Lehlou
2017	Ittihad El Aaiun	1–1 (5–4p)	Wifaq Bir Lehlou
2018	Wifaq Bir Lehlou	2–0	27th of February Boujdour
2019	Chahid Mahfoud El Welad Smara	1–1 (4–2p)	Fariq Dakhla

=== By titles ===
Club	Wins	Winning years
Chahid Mahfoud El Welad Smara	1	2019
Fariq Dakhla	1	2016
Ittihad El Aaiun	1	2017
Wifaq Bir Lehlou	1	2018
