= Viva World Cup =

- Founded: 2006
- Region: International (N.F.-Board)
- Current champions: Kurdistan Region (2012)
- Most championships: Padania (3 titles)
- Website: nfbwebsite.wixsite.com/nfboard/viva

The Viva World Cup is an international association football tournament organized by the N.F.-Board, an umbrella association for teams unaffiliated with FIFA, held five times between 2006 and 2012.

== History ==
Map of Viva World Cup tournaments

Men's Viva World Cup
Euro Viva Cup
Mixed Viva World Cup
Italic: Planned
~~Strikethrough~~: Cancelled

=== Early years ===
The oldest precedent of the Viva World Cup was the Alternative Worldwide Cup of 1988, developed in Jordan.

==== Inauguration ====
In April 2005, the NF-Board announced that the Turkish Republic of Northern Cyprus had been chosen to host the inaugural Viva World Cup, having successfully hosted the KTFF 50th Anniversary Cup, a tournament to celebrate 50 years of the Cyprus Turkish Football Federation, featuring fellow NF-Board member Sápmi and FIFA-unaffiliated Kosovo. The NF-Board hoped that sixteen teams would take part, drawn from across its membership.

==== ELF Cup ====
In spring 2005, the new government elected in the Cyprus Turkish Football Federation (KTFF) was keen to foster relations with other nations. The NF-Board claim that the government of Ferdi Sabit Soyer insisted on restricting which teams could and could not take part in order to head off potential political arguments. For their part, the KTFF claim that the NF-Board made unreasonable financial demands.

The upshot of this was that the NF-Board decided to grant the hosting rights for the tournament to Occitania. In response, the KTFF announced that they would hold their own tournament, the ELF Cup, scheduled for the same time as the Viva World Cup. Some NF-Board members accepted the invitations to take part in the ELF Cup.

==== Occitania 2006 ====
Occitania announced that the tournament would still be held on 19–25 November 2006, with games played in and around Hyères les Palmiers, near Toulon. The number of entrants was reduced to eight, in anticipation of the ELF Cup (which agreed to pay expenses) drawing NF-Board members away from the Viva World Cup. A lack of suitable competitors meant that the tournament was to include six teams: Monaco, the Romani, the Sápmi, Southern Cameroons, West Papua, and the Occitania national football teams.

However, the failure of West Papua and Southern Cameroon to attend the NF-Board General Assembly in September 2006, and logistical problems facing the Romani, threw new doubt on the tournament, which looked as though it might go ahead with just three teams. Four teams - twelve fewer than initially hoped for - were set to take part when Southern Cameroons agreed to send a team; unfortunately, they were unable to take part because of visa problems, resulting in walkovers in all their games. By the end of the week, Sápmi had triumphed, scoring 42 goals in their three games, and lifting the first Viva World Cup trophy, destroying Monaco 21–1 in the final.

==== Sápmi 2008 ====
The second Viva World Cup was played in the Swedish town of Gällivare in Sápmi from 7 to 13 July 2008. The matches were played under the midnight sun. Twelve teams had expressed an interest in participating in the men's tournament; however, only five teams took part, and Padania emerged as winners, beating the Aramean team 2-0. The host, Sápmi, finished in third place.

The women's tournament only had two teams, and the host, Sapmi, beat Kurdistan 15-1 over two legs.

==== Padania 2009 ====
Padania was the host for the 2009 edition. The tournament was played in some important stadiums in northern Italy. The final was held in Verona on June 27, 2009, and saw Padania retain the title, defeating Kurdistan 2-0.

==== Gozo 2010 ====
The Gozitans hosted the tournament at the newly refurbished artificial turf ground of 2009-10 Champions Sannat Lions, as well as the 4,000 capacity Gozo Stadium in Xewkija. From May 31 to June 6, teams from Padania, Kurdistan, Provence, Occitania, Two Sicilies and Gozo competed for the Nelson Mandela Trophy. Only two teams, Gozo and Padania, took part in the women's tournament. The Tibet national football team was looking for sponsors to participate to the Viva World Cup 2010 but failed to come.

Similar to the 2008 edition, the women's tournament only had two teams, and the host, Padania, beat the host, Gozo, 7-0 over two legs.

==== Kurdistan 2012 ====
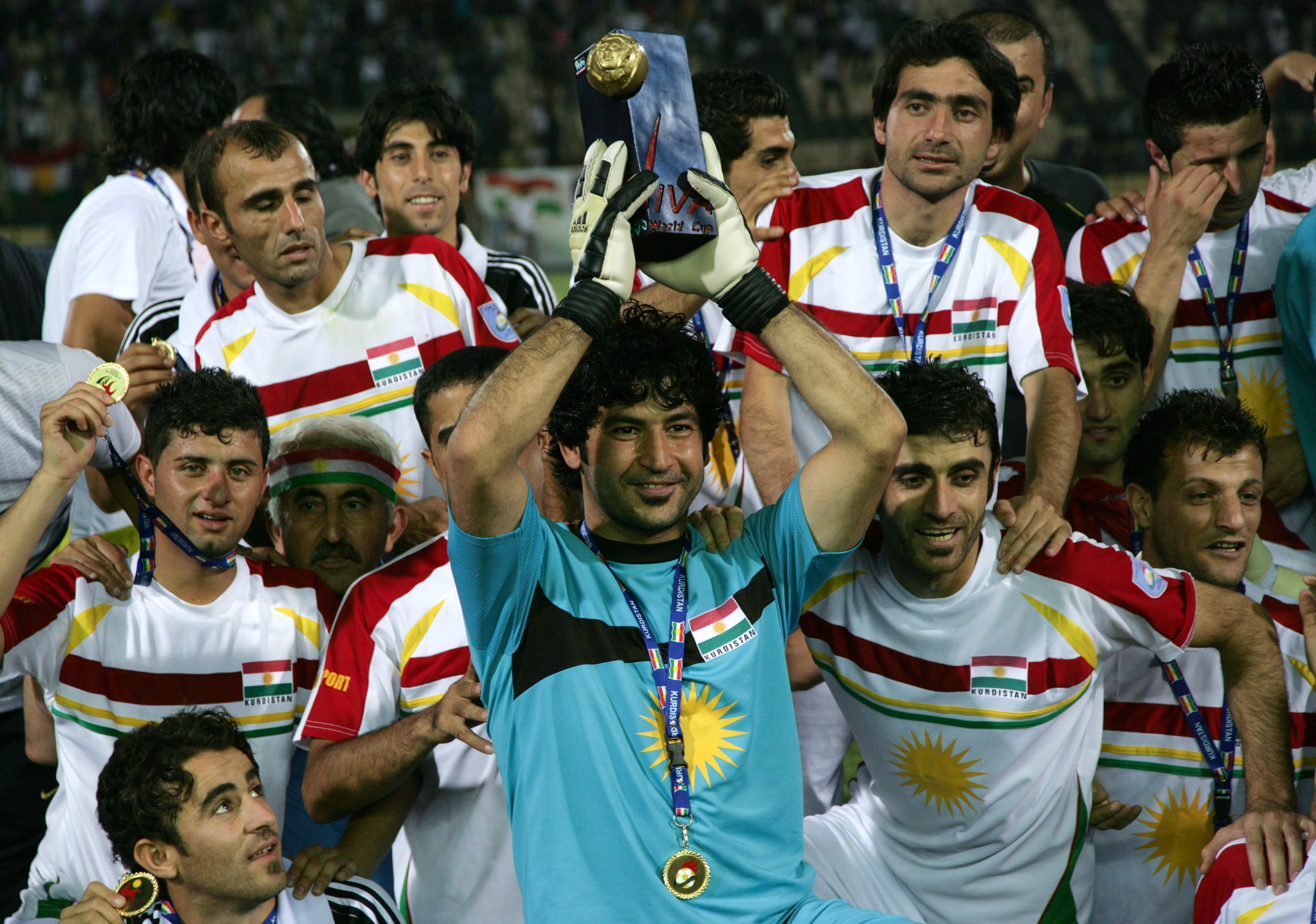
Kurdistan National Football Team Winner of Viva Cup

In December 2009, the NF-Board came to an agreement with the Island Games Association that the Viva World Cup would be held alternately with the Island Games in a deal that would see the IGA assist the NF-Board in its attempts to provide competition for its members and potential members. As a result of this agreement, the fifth Viva World Cup was awarded to Kurdistan, to take place in 2012. This tournament had the most participating teams of any Non-FIFA tournament. The hosts beat Northern Cyprus in the final (the first time the latter failed to win a non-FIFA tournament in which they took part).

=== The Planned Cups (2014—present) ===
==== 2014 Viva World Cup ====
There were three bids for hosting privileges for the Viva World Cup of 2014; however with each of the bids, plans broke down.

The first bidder was Sápmi in 2010 for Östersund. However, in 2013, Sápmi left for CONIFA, so those plans fell through.

Afterwards, the Isle of Man's bid was found shortly after Sápmi's bid failed. However, the year they applied is unknown to the public. However, the Isle of Man left the NFB for CONIFA as well; however the NFB claimed to want to restart that application again for a "pseudo European Championship" in 2015 (which also seems to have never happened).

The final bid was with Tatarstan in 2013–2014 for Kazan — where the anonymous intermediaries were requesting "improbable commission payments" in negotiations, and Andrei Rudakov (the person they were discussing with to make the tournament) had been summoned for embezzlement from the Neuchâtel Xamax Club, and "others". They cancelled the mandate, but the final nail in the coffin was "when the pseudo-organizers asked the NFB to conduct an intention-to-participate survey among its FA members and members of the non-FIFA scene". They tried to move the cup to Winter 2014, but there was too little time, so they couldn't. So the 2014 edition of the Viva World Cup was cancelled.

==== The Cups of 2017 ====
In 2017, after the N.F.-Board announced its return to the Non-FIFA scene, on 21 May, they announced the 2017 Euro Viva Cup, (Note: AKA the EUROVIVA-Cup 2017) in Vichy. However, on 6 December, the authorities of Vichy and Jean-Luc Kit said that the cup was cancelled, as negotiations had stalled between the two parties.

==== Mixed Viva World Cup ====
On 1 February 2024, the N.F.-Board announced the 2025 Mixed Viva World Cup, which would have "both a mix of genres and a mix of rules of the game", and is said to be restricted to non-FIFA UN countries, subdivisions of countries, and transnational/indigenous people. The cup was scheduled to run from June 20–29. However, the event was cancelled.

==== 2026 and 2028 Viva World Cups ====
On 18 January 2025, they tried again and announced 2 new Viva World Cups for 2026 and 2028, saying the 2026 Viva World Cup will be restricted to non-FIFA UN countries, and the 2028 one, to non-FIFA islands and archipelagos, however refused to disclose more detail past that point.

== Tournament results ==
Ed.	Year	Host	First place game			Third place game			Num. teams
Ed.	Year	Host	(gold) Champion	Score	(silver) Runner-up	(bronze) Third	Score	Fourth	Num. teams
1	2006	Occitania	Sápmi	21–1	Monaco	Occitania	w/o	Southern Cameroons (Note: Withdrew before the start of the tournament due to visa problems.)	4
2	2008	Sápmi	Padania	2–0	Arameans Suryoye	Sápmi	3–1	Kurdistan	5
3	2009	Padania	Padania	2–0	Kurdistan	Sápmi	4–4; 5–4 (p)	Provence	6
4	2010	Gozo	Padania	1–0	Kurdistan	Occitania	2–0	Two Sicilies	6
5	2012	Kurdistan	Kurdistan	2–1	Northern Cyprus	Zanzibar	7–2	Provence	9

== Trophy ==
An artist's impression of the original Viva World Cup Trophy (2003).

The current Viva World Cup Trophy was designed by French sculptor Gérard Pigault in 2005, and is named The Nelson Mandela Trophy, in honour of the former South African president.

== Titles ==
- Padania: 3 times (2008, 2009, 2010)
- Sápmi: 1 time (2006)
- Kurdistan Region: 1 time (2012)

== Participating teams ==
Team	(Occitania) 2006	(Sápmi) 2008	(Padania) 2009	(Gozo) 2010	(Kurdistan Region) 2012	Years
Arameans Suryoye		2nd				1
Darfur					9th	1
Gozo			6th	5th		2
Kurdistan Region		4th	2nd	2nd	1st	4
Monaco	2nd					1
Northern Cyprus					2nd	1
Occitania	3rd		5th	3rd	5th	4
Padania		1st	1st	1st		3
Provence		5th	4th	6th	4th	4
Raetia					8th	1
Sápmi	1st	3rd	3rd			3
Southern Cameroons	4th					1
Tamil Eelam					7th	1
Two Sicilies				4th		1
Western Sahara					6th	1
Zanzibar					3rd	1
Total	4	5	6	6	9	

Legend

- 1st – Champions
- 2nd – Runners-up
- 3rd – Third place
- 4th – Fourth place
- — Hosts

== Topscorers ==
Year	Player	Goals
2006	(Sápmi) Eirik Lamøy (Sápmi) Tom Høgli (Sápmi) Steffen Nystrøm	6
2008	(Padania) Stefano Salandra (Padania) Giordan Ligarotti	4
2009	(Sápmi) Svein Thomassen (Provence) Enais Hammoud	5
2010	(Kurdistan Region) Haider Qaraman	5
2012	(Northern Cyprus) Halil Turan (Provence) Christophe Copel	6

== See also ==
- Women's Viva World Cup
- ELF Cup
- FIFI Wild Cup
- CONIFA World Football Cup
- KTFF 50th Anniversary Cup
- Non-FIFA international football
