= Ali Radjel =

Algeria footballer (born 1998)

Personal information
- Full name: Ali Radjel Cheikh Bachir
- Date of birth: 18 January 1998 (age 28)
- Place of birth: Tindouf, Algeria
- Height: 1.79 m (5 ft 10 in)
- Position: Left winger

Team information
- Current team: Tarancón

Youth career
- –2015: Almagro
- 2015–2016: Conquense
- 2016–2017: Rayo Vallecano

Senior career*
Years	Team	Apps	(Gls)
2017	Utenis B	3	(1)
2017	Utenis Utena	14	(4)
2018	Atlético Monzón	11	(3)
2018–2019	Logroñés B	33	(20)
2018	Logroñés	2	(0)
2019–2021	Numancia B	47	(11)
2020–2021	Numancia	4	(0)
2021–2022	Logroñés B	21	(4)
2022–2023	Cristo Atlético	28	(2)
2024	La Solana	21	(6)
2024–	Tarancón	6	(3)
- * Club domestic league appearances and goals as of 13 October 2024

Ali Radjel Cheikh Bachir (born 18 January 1998) is an Algerian-born professional footballer who plays as a left winger for Tercera Federación club Tarancón.

== Club career ==
Ali Radjel was born in Tindouf, Algeria (within the Sahrawi refugee camps) to a Sahrawi mother and a Mauritanian father, and moved to Spain with his family at the age of nine. In July 2016, he moved to Rayo Vallecano's youth setup after representing UB Conquense.

In 2017, after finishing his formation, Ali Radjel moved to Lithuania and joined a host of Spaniards at FK Utenis Utena. After appearing with the B-team in the I Lyga, he made his first team – and A Lyga – debut on 10 August of that year, coming on as a half-time substitute in a 1–1 home draw against FC Stumbras; he scored his first goal on 22 October, in a 3–0 away success over the same club.

On 4 November 2017, Ali Radjel scored a brace in a 2–2 draw at FK Atlantas, and finished the season with four goals in 14 appearances. The following February, he returned to Spain and signed for Tercera División side Atlético Monzón.

In July 2018, after featuring regularly, Ali Radjel moved to UD Logroñés, being initially assigned to the reserves also in the fourth division. He made his first team debut on 2 December, playing the last three minutes in a 1–1 Segunda División B home draw against Real Sociedad B.

In June 2019, after scoring a career-best 20 goals for Logroñés' B-side, Ali Radjel moved to another reserve team, CD Numancia B still in the fourth tier. On 18 June of the following year, he made his first team debut by replacing Erik Morán late into a 1–2 home loss against Cádiz CF in the Segunda División championship. He made two more appearances at the end of that season as the club suffered relegation, but his involvement did not increase in the 2020-21 Segunda División B campaign, only taking the field once as a late substitute and again being utilised mainly by Numancia B.

After a season back with UD Logroñés, appearing exclusively for their reserves in the new fourth tier – the Segunda Federación – he signed for CD Palencia Cristo Atlético, of the same level, in June 2022.

== Personal life ==
Born in the Sahrawi refugee camps, he is a naturalised citizen of Spain.
