= Johnny Nielsen =

Danish wrestler (born 1941)

Personal information
- Nationality: Danish
- Born: 2 March 1941 (age 85) Copenhagen, Denmark

Sport
- Sport: Wrestling

Johnny Nielsen (born 2 March 1941) is a Danish wrestler. He competed in the men's Greco-Roman 57 kg at the 1968 Summer Olympics.
