= Andrei Rudakov =

Russian footballer (born 1961)

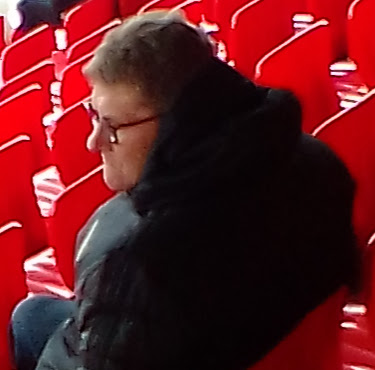

Personal information
- Full name: Andrei Borisovich Rudakov
- Date of birth: 19 January 1961 (age 65)
- Place of birth: Pereslavl-Zalessky, Russian SFSR
- Height: 1.77 m (5 ft 10 in)
- Position: Striker

Senior career*
Years	Team	Apps	(Gls)
1979–1984	FC Shinnik Yaroslavl	128	(28)
1985–1987	FC Spartak Moscow	49	(21)
1987–1990	FC Torpedo Moscow	55	(16)
1990–1991	FC Fribourg	32	(20)
1992–1994	FC Bulle	28	(16)
1994–1996	FC Siviriez		
1996	FC Shinnik Yaroslavl	12	(1)
1997–2001	FC Siviriez		

Managerial career
- 1997–1999: FC Siviriez
- 1999–2001: FC Corminboeuf
- 2011: Neuchâtel Xamax (president)
- 2011: Neuchâtel Xamax (director of sports)
- 2017–2022: FC Arsenal Tula (director of sports)
- * Club domestic league appearances and goals

Andrei Borisovich Rudakov (Russian: Андрей Борисович Рудаков; born 19 January 1961) is a Russian professional football official and coach and a former player.

He played in Switzerland, for FC Fribourg, FC Bulle and FC Siviriez.

== Honours ==
- One of the 11 best players of the URSS: 1984.
- Best young player of the URSS: 1985.
- The USSR Football Federation Cup in 1987.
- Soviet Top League champion: 1987.
- Soviet Top League runner-up: 1985.
- Soviet Top League bronze: 1986, 1988.
- Soviet Cup finalist: 1988, 1989, 1991 (played in the early stages of the 1990/91 tournament for FC Torpedo Moscow).

== European club competitions ==
- UEFA Cup 1985–86 with FC Spartak Moscow : 1 game.
- UEFA Cup 1986–87 with FC Spartak Moscow: 4 games, 3 goals.
- UEFA Cup 1988–89 with FC Torpedo Moscow: 2 games.
- European Cup Winners' Cup 1989–90 with FC Torpedo Moscow: 4 games.

== Post-playing career ==
He remained in Switzerland after retiring as a player and served as the president of Neuchâtel Xamax for a short period of time in 2011.

On 29 July 2017, he was appointed director of sports by the Russian Premier League club FC Arsenal Tula.
