= Stadio Franco Ossola =

Stadium in Masnago, Varese, Italy

Stadio Comunale Franco Ossola
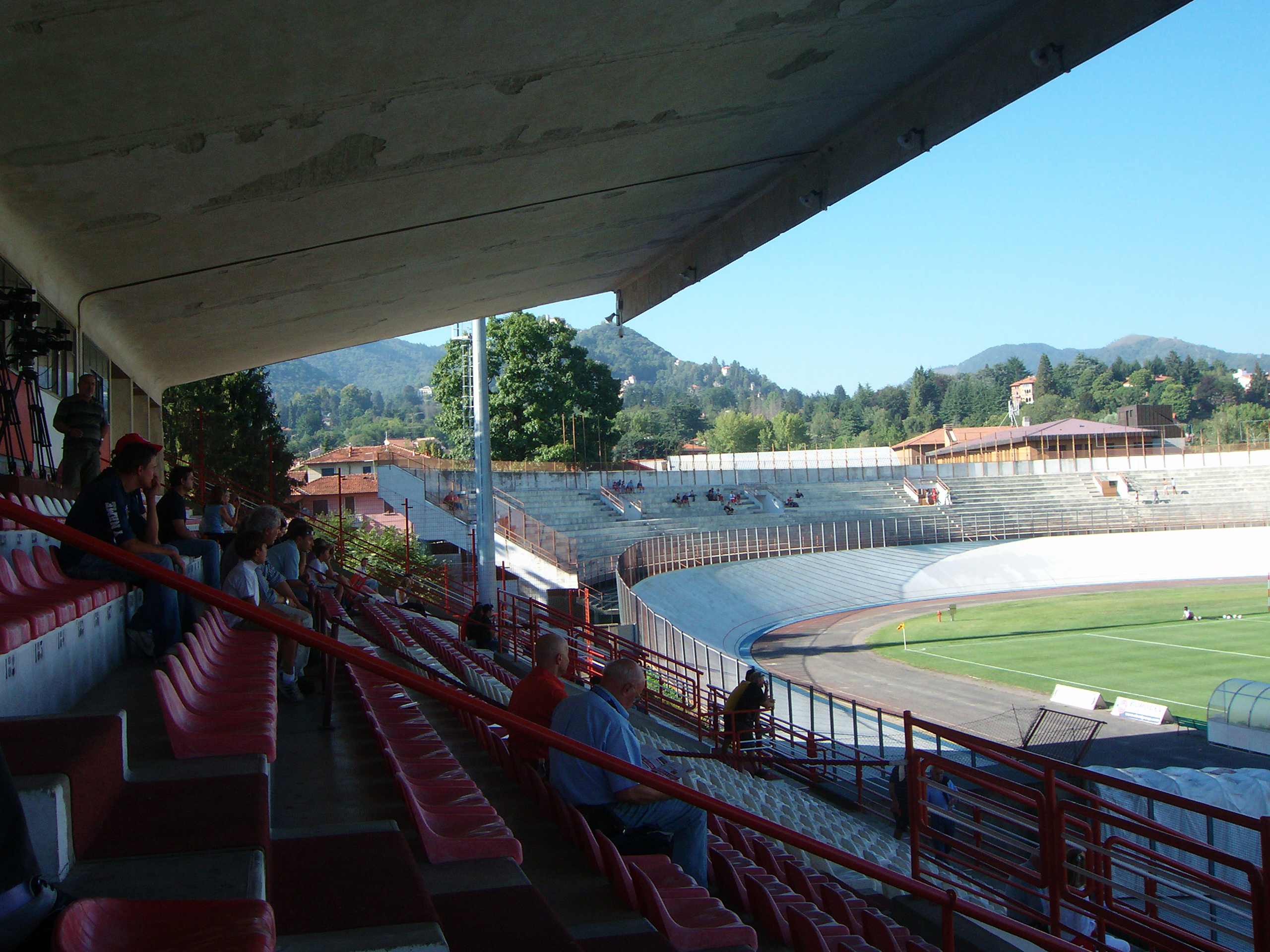
- Interactive map of Stadio Comunale Franco Ossola
- Location: Via Bolchini, Masnago, 21100 Varese, Italy
- Coordinates: 45.8346°N 8.8006°E
- Capacity: 8,213
- Surface: Grass
- Field size: 105x66

Construction
- Groundbreaking: 1925
- Opened: 1925

Tenants
- Varese FC (2020–present); A.S. Varese 1910 (1925–2020)

The Stadio Franco Ossola (also called Luigi Ganna Velodrome) is a sports stadium and velodrome currently in use by the football team Varese FC.

Constructed in 1925, and originally named the Stadio del Littorio, the stadium was renamed in September 1950 in memory of Franco Ossola, an Italian from Varese and player for Torino F.C. who died in 1949 in the Superga air disaster.

The cycling track was used for the UCI Track Cycling World Championships in 1971 and is named after Luigi Ganna, the winner of the first Giro d'Italia in 1909, who was born in nearby Induno Olona.

Originally, the stadium could accommodate up to 23,000 spectators, but the capacity has been reduced to comply with safety standards, so much so that now the north stand, which houses the home fans, is not usable.

In recent years, plans have been drawn up to create a new 10,000 seater stadium to replace the existing one.

| Preceded by Saffron Lane Velodrome; Leicester | UCI Track Cycling World Championships; Venue; 1971 | Succeeded by Stade Vélodrome; Marseille |
