= 2010 Viva World Cup =

Tournament details
- Host country: Gozo
- Dates: 31 May – 5 June
- Teams: 6 (from 1 confederation)
- Venue: 2 (in 2 host cities)

Final positions
- Champions: Padania (3rd title)
- Runners-up: Kurdistan Region
- Third place: Occitania
- Fourth place: Two Sicilies

Tournament statistics
- Matches played: 11
- Goals scored: 31 (2.82 per match)
- Top scorer: (Kurdistan Region) Haider Qaraman (5 goals)

The 2010 Viva World Cup was the fourth Viva World Cup, an international tournament for football open to non-FIFA-affiliated teams, played in Gozo. A record six men's teams competed in the tournament, including the two-time defending champions Padania.

== Participating teams ==
=== Men's Tournament ===
Team	2010 Pos.	Participation
Padania	1st	3rd
Kurdistan Region	2nd	3rd
Occitania	3rd	3rd
Two Sicilies	4th	1st
Gozo	5th	2nd
Provence	6th	3rd

=== Women's Tournament ===
Team	2010 Pos.	Participation
Padania	1st	1st
Gozo	2nd	1st

== Venues ==
Gozo

Xewkija	Sannat
Gozo Stadium	Sannat Ground
36.0382757°N 14.2541962°E	36.0299631°N 14.2385931°E
Capacity:4,000	Capacity:1,500
2010 Viva World Cup is located in Malta

== Men's tournament ==
=== Group Stage ===
==== Group A ====
Team	Pld	W	D	L	GF	GA	GD	Pts
Padania	2	2	0	0	3	1	2	6
Occitania	2	1	0	1	5	1	4	3
Gozo	2	0	0	2	1	7	−6	0

31 May 2010
20:15 CET

Gozo	1–2	Padania
Camilleri 40'	Report	Nannini 7'; Prandelli 82'

Gozo Stadium, Xewkija
Referee: Per Anders Blind (Sweden)

1 June 2010
19:30 CET

Occitania	0–1	Padania
	Report	Ghezzi 65'

Gozo Stadium, Xewkija
Referee: Karim Azad Hatim (Kurdistan)

2 June 2010
19:30 CET

Gozo	0–5	Occitania
	Report	Ballue 1' (pen.), 36'; Taillan 61'; Amiel 88'; Soro 90+2'

Gozo Stadium, Xewkija
Referee: Per Anders Blind (Sweden)

==== Group B ====
Team	Pld	W	D	L	GF	GA	GD	Pts
Kurdistan Region	2	2	0	0	7	3	4	6
Two Sicilies	2	1	0	1	2	4	−2	3
Provence	2	0	0	2	2	4	−2	0

31 May 2010
17:30 CET

Kurdistan Region	4–1	Two Sicilies
Mushin 21'; Qaraman 50', 57'; Abdullah 82'	Report	Cappuccilli 75'

Sannat Ground, Sannat
Referee: Aaron Refalo (Malta)

1 June 2010
17:30 CET

Provence	0–1	Two Sicilies
	Report	Cappuccilli 5' (pen.)

Sannat Ground, Sannat
Referee: Luciano Casnati (Italy)

2 June 2010
17:30 CET

Kurdistan Region	3–2	Provence
Qaraman 31', 90+5'; Rahman 35'	Report	Borghesi 19', 39' (pen.)

Sannat Ground, Sannat
Referee: Antonio Guida (Italy)

=== Knockout stage ===
Semi-finals
4 June – Sannat
Kurdistan Region	2
Occitania	1
4 June – Xewkija
Padania	2
Two Sicilies	0

Final
5 June – Xewkija
Kurdistan Region	0
Padania	1
Third place
5 June – Sannat
Occitania	2
Two Sicilies	0

==== Semi-finals ====
4 June 2010
17:30 CET

Kurdistan Region	2–1	Occitania
Qamaran 71'; Mohamed 82'	Report	Gamet 37'

Sannat Ground, Sannat
Referee: Antonio Guida (Italy)

4 June 2010
19:30 CET

Padania	2–0	Two Sicilies
Nannini 62'; Ganz 86'	Report

Gozo Stadium, Xewkija
Referee: Karim Azad Hatim (Kurdistan)

==== 5th-place match ====
4 June 2010
15:30 CET

Gozo	2–1	Provence
Buttigieg 59'; Camilleri 89'	Report	Juan 19' (pen.)

Gozo Stadium, Xewkija
Referee: Aaron Fenech (Malta)

==== 3rd-place match ====
5 June 2010
14:00 CET

Occitania	2–0	Two Sicilies
Taillan 28'; Gamet 90+3'	Report

Sannat Ground, Sannat
Referee: Luciano Casnati (Italy)

==== Final ====
5 June 2010
18:00 CET

Kurdistan Region	0–1	Padania
	Report	Mosti 24'

Gozo Stadium, Xewkija
Referee: Mario Mazzoleni (Italy)

Viva World Cup 2010 winners

Padania
Third title

== Women's Tournament ==
The 2010 edition was the second and last to feature women's teams, Padania won the tournament and beat the host Gozo over two legs with an aggregate score of 7–0.

June 4, 2010

Padania	4–0	Gozo
Lupi 13'; Baroni 50'; Colamanco 68'; Laterza 77'

June 5, 2010

Padania	3–0	Gozo
Povia 10', 40'; Iostioni 78'

== Top Goalscorer ==
=== Men's tournament ===
Haider Qaraman scored five goals.

=== Women's Tournament ===
Valentina Povia scored two goals.
