= Christophe Copel =

French football player (born 1986)

Personal information
- Date of birth: 20 August 1986 (age 40)
- Place of birth: Marseille, France
- Height: 1.80 m (5 ft 11 in)
- Position: Striker

Team information
- Current team: Fc.lespignan vendres
- Number: 11

Youth career
- 1992–1998: Bouc-bel-Air
- 1998–2005: Olympique Marseille

Senior career*
Years	Team	Apps	(Gls)
2005–2006	Olympique Marseille B		
2006	Tienen	3	(0)
2007	SO Cassis Carnoux	2	(1)
2007–2008	Union Royale Namur	25	(8)
2008–2009	Dender	5	(0)
2009–2010	Boussu Dour Borinage 2022- Fc.lespignan vendres	9	(1)
2010	→ Racing Mechelen (loan)		

International career
2012	Provence	4	(6)
- * Club domestic league appearances and goals

Christophe Copel (born 20 August 1986) is a French former professional footballer who played as a striker.

Rising through the Olympique Marseille alongside players such as Cédric Carrasso, Seydou Keita, Mathieu Flamini, Samir Nasri and Mehdi Benatia, Copel would play his entire professional career in Belgium.
