= Omar M'Dahoma =

Comorian footballer (born 1987)

Personal information
- Date of birth: 10 September 1987 (age 39)
- Place of birth: Dzaoudzi, Mayotte
- Height: 1.76 m (5 ft 9 1/2 in)
- Position: Defender

Team information
- Current team: Istres

Senior career*
Years	Team	Apps	(Gls)
2004–2008	Marseille B		
2008–2011	Marseille Endoume		
2011–2012	Aurillac		
2013–2015	Toulon Var		
2015–2018	Aubagne	61	(5)
2018–2019	Athlético Marseille	25	(0)
2019–	Istres	10	(1)

International career^{‡}
2015–	Comoros	3	(0)
- * Club domestic league appearances and goals as of 01:52, 10 February 2020 (UTC) ‡ National team caps and goals as of 14:22, 15 November 2015 (UTC)

Omar M'Dahoma (born 10 September 1987) is a Comorian international footballer who plays for French club FC Istres, as a defender.

== Career ==
Born in Dzaoudzi, Mayotte, M'Dahoma has played for Marseille B, Endoume Catalans, Aurillac, Toulon Var and Aubagne.

He made his international debut for Comoros in 2015.
