= Pirmam =

Town in Kurdistan Region, Iraq

Pirmam پیرمام Pîrmam
- Town
- Interactive map of Pirmam
- Location within Iraq
- Country: Iraq
- Region: Kurdistan Region
- Governorate: Erbil Governorate
- Elevation: 1,107 m (3,632 ft)

Population
  - Total: 18,205
- Time zone: UTC+3

Pirmam (Kurdish: پیرمام, romanized: Pîrmam), also known as Masif Selahaddin (Arabic: مصيف صلاح الدين) is a town located in the Erbil Governorate of the Kurdistan Region of Iraq.

== Etymology ==
The settlement is believed to have been the patrimony of the 12th-century Yazidi saint Pîr Hesin Meman (Pir Hassan ibn Mam), the ruler of Harir, whom the name of Pirmam is derived from.

== Geography ==
Masif Selahaddin is situated approximately 36 kilometers northeast of Erbil City. The town is visible on any given day from Erbil, especially during the evenings and nighttime hours, Erbil is also visible from the town, notably it is one of the few natural spots where Erbil is visible, where people can park their cars on the hills and have picnics, as most of the topography in the south and west is flat and mostly agricultural these areas do not offer a good view. it is the only well known vantage point where the city is clearly visible, it is a 30-45 minute drive from the city center, depending on the starting point and traffic conditions. The elevation of the area is 1107 m (3632 ft). The area is surrounded by Selahaddin Mountain in the southeastern part, the Safin anticline in the northeast, and the Sartka anticline in the southwestern part.
