= Kurdistan Football Association =

- Sport: Football; Futsal; Beach football
- Abbreviation: IKFA
- Founded: 2006; 19 years ago
- Headquarters: Erbil
- Location: Erbil

Official website
- www.kfa.krd/ckb
- (Kurdistan Region)

The Kurdistan Football Association (Kurdish: یەکێتی تۆپی پێی کوردستان, romanized: Yekêtî Topîpêy Kurdistan) is the football governing body in Iraqi Kurdistan controlling the Kurdistan national football team. It also oversees the Kurdistan Premier League, Kurdistan Cup and Kurdistan Super Cup.

== Official Kurdistan FA Emblem ==
The Kurdistan FA emblem was designed by Kurdish artist Rawand Sirwan Nawroly (Kurdish: ره‌وه‌ند سیروان نه‌ورڕۆڵی) based in London-UK in the year 2005. The emblem represents the Kurdistan flag colours, where the red represents the Kurdish Newroz fire, the yellow represents the Kurdish sun and the green represents the green Kurdistan scenery.

== Presidents of Kurdistan Football Association ==
Name	Périod
Safeen Kanabi	2006 - 2 March 2021
Tariq Abdulrahman	4 March 2021 -present
