= 2008 Viva World Cup =

- VIVA World Cup 2008 official logo

Tournament details
- Host country: Sápmi
- Dates: 7–13 July
- Teams: 5 (from 1 confederation)
- Venues: 2 (in 1 host city)

Final positions
- Champions: Padania (1st title)
- Runners-up: Arameans Suryoye
- Third place: Sápmi
- Fourth place: Kurdistan Region

Tournament statistics
- Matches played: 14
- Goals scored: 59 (4.21 per match)
- Top scorer(s): (Padania) Giordan Ligarotti (Padania) Stefano Salandra (4 goals)

The 2008 Viva World Cup was the second Viva World Cup, an international tournament for football, that took place in July 2008. The winners were Padania, who took home the Nelson Mandela Trophy. The tournament was organised by the N.F.-Board.

The defending champions and hosts were Sápmi. The competition, organized by the Sami people, took place from 7 to 13 July, in Gällivare, Sweden.

== Qualification ==
Due to the inaugural status of this tournament, applicants were admitted to the tournament without a qualification process. As an untested tournament the scheduling doesn't meet the organizational capacity of a billion dollar organization like FIFA.

=== Qualified teams ===
The men's teams that took part were:

- Sápmi (host & holder)
- Padania
- Provence
- Kurdistan Region
- Arameans Suryoye

The women's teams that took part were:

- Sápmi (host)
- Kurdistan Region

== Venues ==
As a small tournament, like its European counterpart in Europeada 2008, this VIVA World Cup was not expected to bring in the numbers and financial support of UEFA Euro 2008 earlier this summer; the stadia venues are thus rather small.

The hosts of the games were:

- Gällivare Stadium
- Malmberget Stadium

== Overview ==
Padania became the 2008 Viva World Cup champions beating Arameans Suryoye in the final 2–0. The hosts Sapmi, after coming 4th in the group stage, ended by as a lucky 3rd after winning the last edition. The Arameans Suryoye team were the surprise of the tournament qualifying for the final at their first attempt. Iraqi Kurdistan, also debuting, finished 3rd in the group stage but lost in the 4th place play off to Sapmi. To round of the places, in a distant last position, having lost all of their group games, was Provence, a region of France.

In the inaugural women's tournament the hosts Sapmi came through after an aggregate 16–1 thrashing of Iraqi Kurdistan.

== Men's results ==
All times are Central European Summer Time (UTC+2)

=== Men's First Round ===
Pos	Team	Pld	W	D	L	GF	GA	GD	Pts	Qualification	(Padania)	(Aramean-Syriac people)	(Kurdistan Region)	(Sápmi)	(Provence)
1	Padania	4	4	0	0	14	3	+11	12	Qualification to Finals	—	4–1	2–1	—	—
2	Arameans Suryoye	4	2	1	1	7	4	+3	7	Qualification to Finals	—	—	—	1–0	5–0
3	Kurdistan Region	4	1	2	1	6	4	+2	5	Third-place match	—	0–0	—	—	—
4	Sápmi (H)	4	1	1	2	6	7	−1	4	Third-place match	0–2	—	2–2	—	4–2
5	Provence	4	0	0	4	3	18	−15	0		1–6	—	—	—	—

(H) Hosts

7 July 2008
23:00

Sápmi	2–2	Kurdistan Region
Eira 50'; Bertelsen 63'		Khandan 40'; Halgurd 70'

Gällivare Stadium, Gällivare
Attendance: 1,300
Referee: (Norway) Johnny Nielsen

8 July 2008
17:00

Provence	1–6	Padania
Giordano 23'		Cossato 7'; Salandra 34', 45' (pen.); Ligarotti 36', 80'; Ferrari 90'

Gällivare Stadium, Gällivare
Attendance: 600
Referee: (Norway) Ragnar Dahl

9 July 2008
13:00

Provence	0–3	Kurdistan Region
		Rahman 55'; Halgurd 90+1', 90+3'

Malmberget Stadium, Malmberget
Attendance: 600
Referee: (Norway) Mikkel Sara

9 July 2008
17:00

Arameans Suryoye	1–0	Sápmi
Yüksel 62'

Gällivare Stadium, Gällivare
Attendance: 1,000
Referee: (Norway) Ragnar Dahl

10 July 2008
12:00

Arameans Suryoye	5–0	Provence
Muqdisi 2', 32'; Alan 5'; Kaplan 65', 81'

Malmberget Stadium, Malmberget
Attendance: 30
Referee: (Sweden) Jorgen Klippmark

10 July 2008
17:00

Padania	2–1	Kurdistan Region
Gentilini 9'; Salandra 26' (pen.)		Aziz 41'

Gällivare Stadium, Gällivare
Attendance: 1,100
Referee: (Norway) Johnny Nielsen

11 July 2008
13:00

Sápmi	0–2	Padania
		Cossato 82'; Ligarotti 85'

Malmberget Stadium, Malmberget
Attendance: 400
Referee: (Norway) Ragnar Dahl

11 July 2008
17:00

Kurdistan Region	0–0	Arameans Suryoye

Gällivare Stadium, Gällivare
Attendance: 700
Referee: (Sweden) Per Anders Blind

12 July 2008
12:00

Padania	4–1	Arameans Suryoye
Cossato 18'; D'Alessandro 40', 90'; Salandra 73'		Muqdisi 64' (pen.)

Malmberget Stadium, Malmberget
Attendance: 150
Referee: (Sweden) Per Anders Blind

12 July 2008
16:00

Sápmi	4–2	Provence
Eira 3'; Eira 7'; Logje 28'; Dreyer 83'		Giordano 5', 14'

Gällivare Stadium, Gällivare
Attendance: 800
Referee: (Norway) Johnny Nielsen

=== Men's 3/4 place playoff ===
13 July 2008
11:00

Kurdistan Region	1–3	Sápmi
Jalal 90'		Eira 6', 32'; Stangnes 8'

Malmberget Stadium, Malmberget
Attendance: 400
Referee: (Norway) Johnny Nielsen

=== Men's Final ===
13 July 2008
20:00

Padania	2–0	Arameans Suryoye
Colombo 9'; Ligarotti 14'

Gällivare Stadium, Gällivare
Attendance: 1,400
Referee: (Sweden) Monty Rieman

Viva World Cup 2008 winners

Padania
First title

== Women's results ==
The first edition, with only two teams, was won by the host, Sapmi, who beat Kurdistan over two legs with an aggregate score of 15–1.

All times are Central European Summer Time (UTC+2)

10 July 2008
18:00

Sápmi	4–0	(Kurdistan Region) Kurdistan
Skulbørstad

Malmberget Stadium, Malmberget

13 July 2008
11:00

Sápmi	11–1	(Kurdistan Region) Kurdistan
Skulbørstad; Eira; Hallen; Esseryd; Oscarsson; Ragnhild Fosshaug		Goal

Gällivare Stadium, Gällivare

Viva World Cup 2008 winners

Sápmi
Inaugural title

== Top scorers ==
=== Men ===
4 goals

- (Padania) Stefano Salandra
- (Padania) Giordan Ligarotti

=== Women ===
9 goals

- (Sápmi) Gry Keskitalo Skulbørstad

== See also ==
- ELF Cup
- UNPO Cup
- FIFI Wild Cup
- KTFF 50th Anniversary Cup
- Nouvelle Fédération-Board
