= Monaco national football team =

Men's national association football team representing Monaco

Monaco
- Association: Fédération Monégasque de Football
- Confederation: ConIFA (Former)
- Head coach: Thierry Petit
- Most caps: Olivier Lechner (9)
- Top scorer: Olivier Lechner (7)
- Home stadium: Stade Didier Deschamps (Cap-d'Ail, France)
- FIFA code: MON
First colours	Second colours

First international
- Gibraltar 5–0 Monaco (Gibraltar; 11 June 2000)

Biggest win
- Monaco 13–1 Chechnya (Cap-d'Ail, France; 18 February 2006)

Biggest defeat
- Sápmi 21–1 Monaco (Hyères, France; 24 November 2006)

VIVA World Cup
- Appearances: 1 (first in 2006)
- Best result: Runners-up (2006)

The Monaco national football team is a national side that represents the sovereign city-state of Monaco in association football. The team is controlled by the Monégasque Football Federation, the governing body for all football in Monaco. Monaco is not a member of FIFA or UEFA, and therefore cannot enter the FIFA World Cup nor the UEFA European Championship. Monaco was a founding member of the N.F.-Board in 2003, and finished second in the 2006 VIVA World Cup inaugural edition. However, due to political opposition, Monaco severed ties with the organization in 2010.

Although Monaco has a National Olympic Committee and has therefore been eligible for the Summer Olympics and Mediterranean Games, they have never entered either games' football tournaments.

== History ==
=== Beginnings ===
After the foundation of the Monégasque Football Federation in April 2000, Monaco played its first match in June of the same year against Gibraltar, losing 5–0. After this match, Monaco would return to play a match a year later against Tibet, in Freiburg, in Germany, winning 2–1.

== Overview ==
Since 2001, Monaco has participated in twenty-seven games, winning eight, drawing six, and losing thirteen. The team competes against local clubs, nations, unrecognized states, people groups, and territories. Monaco is managed by Martino López, and competes at the Stade Didier Deschamps in Cap-d'Ail, France. According to Elo Ratings, Monaco is ranked 200th in the world as of November 2020.

The team's roster is composed of roughly sixty men; only five offer professional experience, since the team is mainly made up of civil servants and employees of the Société des bains de mer de Monaco.

== Last squad ==
No.	Pos.	Player	Date of birth (age)	Caps	Club
16	GK	Anthony Minioni		2	(Monaco)
1	GK	Thierry Vatrican	19 August 1975 (age 51)	5	(Monaco)
	DF	Marc Vassallo	28 November 1999 (age 26)		(Monaco)
	DF	John Landau			(Monaco)
	DF	Eric Fissore			(Monaco)
	DF	Laurent Schileo			(Monaco)
	DF	Julien Sirio			(Monaco)
	DF	Jean-Paul Pennacino			(Monaco)
	MF	Romain Armita			(Monaco)
	MF	Anthony Rinaldi			(Monaco)
	MF	Fabien Gallis			(Monaco)
	MF	Remy Rinaldi			(Monaco)
	MF	Olivier Pasquier			(Monaco)
	MF	Anthony Houry			(Monaco)
	MF	Benoît Biancheri	28 November 2000 (age 25)		(Monaco)
	FW	Guy Platto			(Monaco)
	FW	Olivier Lechner			(Monaco)
	FW	Sergio Bonnaventura	28 November 2000 (age 25)		(Monaco)

== Competitive record ==
VIVA World Cup
Year	Result	Position	GP	W	D	L	GS	GA	Squad
(Occitania) 2006	Runners-up	2nd	4	2	0	2	7	37	Squad
(Sápmi) 2008	Did not enter								
(Padania) 2009	Did not enter								
(Gozo) 2010	Did not enter								
(Kurdistan Region) 2012	Did not enter								
ConIFA World Football Cup
(Sápmi) 2014	Did not enter								
(Abkhazia) 2016	Did not enter								
(Barawa) 2018	Did not enter								
Total	Runners-up	1/9	4	2	0	2	7	37	–

== Complete international results ==
=== 2000s ===
11 June 2000 Friendly	Gibraltar	5–0	Monaco	Gibraltar
	(?)	[Report]		Stadium: Victoria Stadium
Note: Monaco fielded players from the Monaco league, some of them French nationals

14 July 2001 Friendly	Monaco	2–1	Tibet	Freiburg, Germany
	Damien Choisit (?); Serge Turuan (?)		(?)	Stadium: Dreisamstadion

18 February 2002 Friendly	Monaco	2–2	Gibraltar	Cap-d'Ail, France
	Olivier Pasquier 25'; Jean-Paul Pennacino 47'	Report	Dylan Moreno 15' (pen.); Lee Casciaro 70' (pen.)	Stadium: Stade Municipal Cap-d'Ail

23 November 2002 Friendly	Vatican City	0–0	Monaco	Albano Laziale, Italy
				Stadium: Stadio Pio XII

12 February 2005 Friendly	Occitania	0–0	Monaco	Béziers, France
				Stadium: Stade Raoul-Barrière

17 May 2005 Friendly	Monaco	1–1	Occitania	Cap-d'Ail, France
				Stadium: Stade Municipal Cap-d'Ail

27 May 2005 Friendly	Gibraltar	4–0	Monaco	Gibraltar
				Stadium: Victoria Stadium

17 December 2005 Friendly	Monaco	2–1	Occitania	Cap-d'Ail, France
				Stadium: Stade Municipal Cap-d'Ail

18 February 2006 Friendly	Monaco	13–1	Chechnya	Cap-d'Ail, France
				Stadium: Stade Municipal Cap-d'Ail

22 April 2006 Friendly	Monaco	1–7	Kosovo	Cap-d'Ail, France
	Olivier El Missouri (?)	Report	Haxhi Zeka 15'; Uliks Emra 17', 65'; Dukagjin Gashi 29'; Sunaj Keqi 75'; Isuf Llumnica 82'; Shpëtim Idrizi 83'	Stadium: Stade Municipal Cap-d'Ail

20 November 2006 2006 VIVA World Cup	Monaco	3–0	Ambazonia	Costebelle, France
13:30 CET		walkover		Stadium: Stade Gaby Robert
Note:

21 November 2006 2006 VIVA World Cup	Monaco	3–2	Occitania	Hyères, France
15:30 CET	Olivier Lechner 20'; Guy Platto 53'; Anthony Houry 59'	(Report)	Patric Léglise 51'; Sebastian Rojas 72'	Stadium: Stade L’Ayguade

23 November 2006 2006 VIVA World Cup	Monaco	0–14	Sápmi	Hyères, France
15:30 CET		(Report)	Trond Olsen 5', 17', 45', 50'; Steffen Nystrøm 12', 16', 23', 28'; Magnus Andersen 26'; Olav Råstad 40'; Eirik Lamøy 57'; Espen Bruer 66'; Tom Høgli 77'; Jonas Johansen 83'	Stadium: Stade L’Ayguade

24 November 2006 2006 VIVA World Cup	Monaco	1–21	Sápmi	Hyères, France
15:30 CET	Romain Armita 50'	(Report)	Trond Olsen 5'; Tom Høgli 7', 20', 40'; Eirik Lamøy 32', 39', 51', 55'; Steffen Nystrøm 35'; Olav Råstad 38', 45' (pen.); Espen Bruer 59', 81'; Jonas Johansen 62', 65', 88'; Leif Arne Brekke 72' (pen.); Torkil Nilssen 76', 78'; Espen Minde 84'; Matti Eira 87'	Stadium: Stade L’Ayguade

8 November 2008 Friendly	Occitania	2–2	Monaco	Caraglio, Italy
	(?)		(?)

20 December 2008 Friendly	Monaco	2–3	Provence	Cap-d'Ail, France
	Gregory Campi (?)		(?)	Stadium: Stade Municipal Cap-d'Ail

=== 2010s ===
3 April 2010 Friendly	Monaco	1–5	Occitania	Saint Dalmas-de-Tende, France
	(?)		(?)

3 May 2011 Friendly	Vatican City	1–2	Monaco	Albano Laziale, Italy
	Alessandro Quarto (?)		Olivier Lechner (?)	Stadium: Stadio Pio XII

11 June 2011 Friendly	Monaco	1–3	Croatia Amateurs	Cap-d'Ail, France
	(?)		(?)	Stadium: Stade Municipal Cap-d'Ail

6 October 2012 Friendly	Monaco	1–2	Raetia	Beausoleil, France
	(?)	0–1 (Half time); 1–1; 1–2	(?)	Stadium: Stade des Moneghetti

13 February 2013 Friendly	Provence	6–1	Monaco	Saint-Zacharie, France
	Pape Fall 16', 22', 36'; Anthony Mendy 30'; Nicolas Ferrero 44'; Romain Campagna 55'		Olivier Lechner 32'	Stadium: Stade François Coulomb

22 June 2013 Friendly	Monaco	2–0	Vatican City	Cap-d'Ail, France
	Morgan Escarras 9'; Eric Fissore 34'			Stadium: Stade Municipal Cap-d'Ail

6 April 2014 Friendly	Ellan Vannin	10–0	Monaco	Douglas, Isle of Man
	Ciaran McNulty 1'; Calum Morrissey 2', 45'; Julian Ringham (?); Sean Quaye 66'; Chris Bass Jr 69'; Joey Morling (?); Sam Caine (?)			Stadium: King George V Bowl stadium Attendance: 1,100

10 May 2014 Friendly	Vatican City	0–2	Monaco	Rome, Italy
			(?)	Stadium: Campo Pio XI

27 April 2017 Friendly	Vatican City	0–0	Monaco	Rome, Italy
				Stadium: Campo Pio XI

== Head-to-head record ==
As of 27 April 2017

Team	Pld	W	D	L	GF	GA	GD	WPCT
Ambazonia	1	1	0	0	3	0	+3	100.00
Chechnya	1	1	0	0	13	1	+12	100.00
Croatia Amateurs	1	0	0	1	1	3	−2	0.00
Ellan Vannin	1	0	0	1	0	10	−10	0.00
Gibraltar	3	0	1	2	2	11	−9	0.00
Kosovo	1	0	0	1	1	7	−6	0.00
Occitania	6	2	3	1	9	11	−2	33.33
Provence	2	0	0	2	3	9	−6	0.00
Raetia	1	0	0	1	1	2	−1	0.00
Sápmi	2	0	0	2	1	35	−34	0.00
Tibet	1	1	0	0	2	1	+1	100.00
Vatican City	5	3	2	0	6	1	+5	60.00
Total	25	8	6	11	42	91	−49	32.00

Source: Results

== Unofficial results ==
21 June 2004 Friendly	AS Marsa (Tunisia)	3–1	Monaco	Tunis, Tunisia
			(?) Eric Fissore

28 May 2005 Friendly	Amateur Alliance FA (Gibraltar)	4–0	Monaco	Gibraltar
	(?)			Stadium: Victoria Stadium

8 September 2007 Friendly	HNK Orijent 1919 (Croatia)	1–2	Monaco	Rijeka, Croatia
	(?)		(?)

7 June 2008 Friendly	Monaco	2–3	(Croatia) HNK Orijent 1919	Cap-d'Ail, France
	(?)		(?)	Stadium: Stade Municipal Cap-d'Ail

26 September 2009 Friendly	FC Lucciana (France)	2–5	Monaco	Lucciana, France
	(?)		(?)

5 June 2010 Friendly	Monaco	3–2	(France) Callas	Beausoleil, France
	(?)		(?)	Stadium: Stade des Moneghetti

14 April 2012 Friendly	Monaco	4–3	(Italy) Piacenza Calcio 1919	Nice, France
	Olivier Lechner (?); Fernand Sabatel (?)		(?)

== Historical kits ==
2001 Home	2002 Away	Home 2006	Home 2011	Away 2011	Home 2012-13	Home 2014	Home 2014

== Honours ==
=== Non-FIFA competitions ===
- Viva World Cup
  - Runners-up (1): 2006

== See also ==
- Football in Monaco
- Monégasque Football Federation
- Non-FIFA international football
