= 2006 Viva World Cup =

Tournament details
- Host country: Occitania
- Dates: 20–24 November
- Teams: 4 (from 1 confederation)
- Venue: 2 (in 2 host cities)

Final positions
- Champions: Sápmi (1st title)
- Runners-up: Monaco
- Third place: Occitania
- Fourth place: Southern Cameroons

Tournament statistics
- Matches played: 8
- Goals scored: 60 (7.5 per match)
- Top scorer(s): (Sápmi) Eirik Lamøy (Sápmi) Tom Høgli (Sápmi) Steffen Nystrøm (6 goals)

The 2006 Viva World Cup was the first Viva World Cup, an association football tournament for states, minorities, stateless peoples and regions unaffiliated with FIFA, which took place in Occitania from 20 November 2006 to 24 November 2006.

== Tournament background ==
=== The inaugural tournament ===
In April 2005, the NF-Board announced that Turkish Republic of Northern Cyprus had been chosen to host the inaugural VIVA World Cup, having successfully hosted a tournament to celebrate 50 years of the KTFF, the KTFF 50th Anniversary Cup, featuring fellow NF-Board member Sápmi and FIFA-unaffiliated Kosovo. The NF-Board hoped that sixteen teams would take part, drawn from across its membership.

=== Controversy ===
In the Spring of 2005, a new government was elected in the Turkish Republic of Northern Cyprus, keen to foster relations with other nations. The NF-Board claimed that the government of Ferdi Sabit Soyer insisted on restricting which nations could and could not take part in order to head off potential political arguments. For their part, the KTFF claimed that the NF-Board made unreasonable financial demands.

The upshot of this was that the NF-Board decided to grant the hosting rights for the tournament to Occitania. In response, the KTFF announced that they would hold their own tournament, the ELF Cup, scheduled for the same time as the VIVA World Cup. Some NF-Board members have accepted invitations to take part in the ELF Cup.

=== Occitania 2006 ===
Occitania announced that the tournament would still be held from 19–25 November 2006, with games played in and around Hyères les Palmiers, near Toulon. The number of entrants was downsized to eight, in anticipation of the ELF Cup - which agreed to pay expenses - drawing NF-Board members away from the VIVA World Cup. However, a lack of suitable competitors meant that the tournament was to include six teams: Monaco, the Roma, the Sápmi, Southern Cameroons, West Papua, and the hosts.

However, the failure of West Papua and Southern Cameroon to attend the NF-Board General Assembly in September 2006, and logistical problems facing the Roma, threw new doubt on the tournament, which looked as though it may go ahead with just three teams. Fortunately, Southern Cameroons were able to agree to send a team, and four teams - twelve fewer than initially hoped for - were set to contest the title.

There were yet more problems for the organisers when Southern Cameroons were unable to take part because of visa problems, resulting in walkovers in all their games.

By the end of the week, Sápmi had triumphed, scoring 42 goals in their three games, and lifting the first VIVA World Cup trophy.

== Squads ==
For a list of all squads that appeared in the final tournament, see 2006 VIVA World Cup squads.

== Results ==
The four teams played a round-robin group stage, with the top two playing off for the title.

Team	Pld	W	D	L	GF	GA	GD	Pts
Sápmi	3	3	0	0	24	0	+24	9
Monaco	3	2	0	1	6	16	–10	6
Occitania	3	1	0	2	5	10	–5	3
Southern Cameroons	3	0	0	3	0	9	–9	0

20 November 2006
13:30 CET

Monaco	3–0	Southern Cameroons
	walkover

Stade Gaby Robert, Costebelle

20 November 2006
15:15 CET

Occitania	0–7	Sápmi
	(Report)	Høgli 22', 25'; Lamøy 38'; Nystrøm 49'; Råstad 57'; Nilssen 63'; Bruer 72'

Stade Gaby Robert, Costebelle

21 November 2006
13:30 CET

Sápmi	3–0	Southern Cameroons
	walkover

Stade Gaby Robert, Costebelle

21 November 2006
15:30 CET

Occitania	2–3	Monaco
Léglise 51'; Rojas 72'	(Report)	Lechner 20'; Platto 53'; Houry 59'

Stade L’Ayguade, Hyères

23 November 2006
13:30 CET

Occitania	3–0	Southern Cameroons
	walkover

Stade L’Ayguade, Hyères

23 November 2006
15:30 CET

Sápmi	14–0	Monaco
Olsen 5', 17', 45', 50'; Nystrøm 12', 16', 23', 28'; Andersen 26'; Råstad 40'; Lamøy 57'; Bruer 66'; Høgli 77'; Johansen 83'	(Report)

Stade L’Ayguade, Hyères

=== Third place match ===
24 November 2006
18:00 CET

Occitania	3–0	Southern Cameroons
	walkover

Stade L’Ayguade, Hyères

=== Final ===
24 November 2006
19:00 CET

Sápmi	21–1	Monaco
Olsen 5'; Høgli 7', 20', 40'; Lamøy 32', 39', 51', 55'; Nystrøm 35'; Råstad 38', 45' (pen.); Bruer 59', 81'; Johansen 62', 65', 88'; Brekke 72' (pen.); Nilssen 76', 78'; Minde 84'; Eira 87'	(Report)	Armita 50'

Stade Perruc, Hyères

Viva World Cup 2006 winners

Sápmi
Inaugural title

== Scorers ==
6 goals

- (Sápmi) Eirik Lamøy
- (Sápmi) Tom Høgli
- (Sápmi) Steffen Nystrøm
