= Thierry Vatrican =

Monegasque judoka and footballer (born 1975)

Thierry Vatrican OLY
Personal information
- Born: 19 August 1975 (age 51) Monaco
- Occupation: Judoka
Association football career
- Position: Goalkeeper
Team information
- Current team: Sun Casino
Senior career*
Years	Team	Apps	(Gls)
2005–20??	Sun Casino		
International career
2005–2006	Monaco	5	(0)
- * Club domestic league appearances and goals

Sport
- Country: Monaco
- Sport: Judo
- Weight class: –81 kg

Profile at external databases
- JudoInside.com: 7620

Thierry Vatrican (born 19 August 1975) is a Monegasque former judoka and former footballer who played as goalkeeper for Sun Casino. He competed at the 1996 Summer Olympics and the 2000 Summer Olympics and was the Monegasque flag bearer at both those games.

== Judo career ==
=== Olympic Games ===
Thierry Vatrican competed at the 1996 Summer Olympics and the 2000 Summer Olympics as a judoka. He finished seventeenth at both tournaments.

=== Games of the Small States ===
He represented Monaco at the 1999, 2003, 2005, 2007 and 2009 editions of the Games of the Small States of Europe where he won a total of two gold medals, two silver medals and one bronze medal across 20 years.

== Football career ==
=== Club career ===
Apart from judo, Thierry Vatrican was also a footballer who played for Sun Casino and the Monaco national team.

He won the Challenge Prince Rainier III six times with Sun Casino.

=== International career ===
Vatrican was capped five times for Monaco between 2005 and 2006, and he made his debut during the 4–0 loss against Gibraltar on 27 May 2005. He was then an unused substitute during Monaco’s next three matches against Occitania, Chechnya, and Kosovo respectively between December 2005 and April 2006.

He was the starting goalkeeper by November 2006 as Monaco came runners-up in the 2006 Viva World Cup after losing 20–1 against Sápmi on 24 November 2006; he retired from international football after the tournament ended as Monaco would not play another match until November 2008.

=== Career statistics ===
As of match played 24 November 2006.

Appearances and goals by national team and year
National team	Year	Apps	Goals
Monaco	2005	1	0
Monaco	2006	4	0
Total		5	0

== Later career ==
After retiring from judo and football, Vatrican found work as a sous-chef at Monte Carlo Casino. He also became the assistant treasurer for the Monegasque Association of Olympic Athletes.

== Football career honours ==
Sun Casino

- Challenge Prince Rainier III
  - Champions (6): 2005–06, 2006–07, 2008–09, 2009–10, 2010–11, 2012–13

Monaco

- Viva World Cup:
  - Runners-up (1): 2006
