= Ambazonia national football team =

Football team in Cameroon

Ambazonia
- Confederation: N.F.-Board
First colours

First international
- Chechnya 2–2 Ambazonia (The Hague, Netherlands; 23 June 2005)

Biggest win
- None

Biggest defeat
- Monaco 3–0 Ambazonia (Costebelle, France; 20 November 2006); Sápmi 3–0 Ambazonia (Costebelle, France; 21 November 2006); Occitania 3–0 Ambazonia (Hyères, France; 23 November 2006); Occitania 3–0 Ambazonia (Hyères, France; 24 November 2006)

VIVA World Cup
- Appearances: 1 (first in 2006)
- Best result: Fourth place (2006)

The Ambazonia national football team represents Ambazonia, a political entity in the former Southern Cameroons. They are not affiliated with FIFA and therefore cannot compete for the FIFA World Cup. Instead, they are part of the N.F.-Board and can compete in their competitions.

== History ==
Ambazonia is a movement by Anglophone Cameroonian separatists who want the Northwest and Southwest of Cameroon to be independent. The Ambazonia national football team competed in the 2006 Viva World Cup. The team has been nicknamed the Wata na Wata football team.

== Historical kits ==
2005 Home	2017 Home
