= Eirik Lamøy =

Norwegian footballer (born 1984)

Personal information
- Full name: Eirik André Lamøy
- Date of birth: 7 November 1984 (age 41)
- Place of birth: Harstad, Norway
- Height: 1.77 m (5 ft 10 in)
- Positions: Striker; midfielder

Youth career
- –2003: Harstad

Senior career*
Years	Team	Apps	(Gls)
2002–2003	Harstad	39	(18)
2004–2005	Tromsdalen	43	(3)
2006	Degerfors	23	(2)
2007–2008	Tromsdalen	37	(20)
2009–2015	Sandefjord	163	(26)

International career
2006	Sápmi	3	(6)
- * Club domestic league appearances and goals as of 18 August 2015

Eirik André Lamøy (born 7 November 1984) is a Norwegian professional football striker who last played for Sandefjord.

== Career ==
He started his career at Harstad, and joined Tromsdalen ahead of the 2004 season. He spent the 2006 season in the Swedish club Degerfors, but returned after that season. Lamøy became the top goalscorer of the 2006 VIVA World Cup with six goals, beside Tom Høgli and Steffen Nystrøm.

In 2007 and 2008, Lamøy was scouted by both Tromsø, Bodø/Glimt and Notodden. In the summer of 2008, he signed for Sandefjord. The transfer took place on 1 January 2009.

== Career statistics ==
As of 18 August 2015

Season	Club	Division	League		Cup		Total	
Season	Club	Division	Apps	Goals	Apps	Goals	Apps	Goals
2007	Tromsdalen	Adeccoligaen	13	3	2	0	15	1
2008	Tromsdalen	Second Division	24	17	1	2	25	19
2009	Sandefjord	Tippeligaen	14	1	2	0	16	1
2010	Sandefjord	Tippeligaen	24	4	4	0	28	4
2011	Sandefjord	Adeccoligaen	29	7	3	0	32	7
2012	Sandefjord	Adeccoligaen	30	4	4	3	34	7
2013	Sandefjord	Adeccoligaen	28	8	2	0	30	8
2014	Sandefjord	1. divisjon	22	2	0	0	22	2
2015	Sandefjord	Tippeligaen	16	0	1	0	17	0
Career Total			200	46	19	5	219	51
