= KTFF 50th Anniversary Cup =

2005 KTFF 50th Anniversary Cup
Tournament details
- Host country: Northern Cyprus
- Dates: 2–4 November 2005
- Teams: 3
- Venue: 2 (in 2 host cities)

Final positions
- Champions: Northern Cyprus (1st title)
- Runners-up: Kosovo
- Third place: Sápmi

Tournament statistics
- Matches played: 3
- Goals scored: 14 (4.67 per match)
- Top scorer: (Northern Cyprus) Yasin Kansu (3 goals)
- Best player: (Kosovo) Shpëtim Hasani

The KTFF 50th Anniversary Cup was a football tournament held under the auspices of the NF-Board. It celebrated 50 years of the Cyprus Turkish Football Federation.

== History ==
The KTFF and featured representative sides from the host nation, the Sápmi and Kosovo. Northern Cyprus triumphed in a round-robin tournament.

=== Squads ===
==== Kosovo ====
Kosovo

Coach: (Kosovo) Muharrem Sahiti

No.	Pos.	Player	Date of birth (age)	Club
	GK	Valmir Bytyqi	25 February 1982 (aged 23)	(Football Federation of Kosovo) Besa Pejë
	GK	Labinot Qosa	22 February 1985 (aged 20)	(Football Federation of Kosovo) Prishtina
	DF	Arsim Abazi	28 November 1972 (aged 32)	(Football Federation of Kosovo) Ferizaj
	DF	Mervan Hoxha	13 November 1980 (aged 24)	(Football Federation of Kosovo) Prishtina
	DF	Denis Krasniqi	25 July 1981 (aged 24)	(Football Federation of Kosovo) Besa Pejë
	DF	Arben Zhjeqi	22 January 1983 (aged 22)	(Football Federation of Kosovo) Prishtina
	DF	Shqipran Skeraj	24 November 1985 (aged 19)	(Football Federation of Kosovo) Prishtina
	MF	Sunaj Keqi	30 September 1968 (aged 37)	(Football Federation of Kosovo) Drita
	MF	Shpëtim Idrizi	12 November 1981 (aged 23)	(Football Federation of Kosovo) Trepça'89
	MF	Ilir Nallbani	11 July 1982 (aged 23)	(Hungarian Football Federation) Tatabánya
	MF	Alban Bekteshi	2 January 1984 (aged 21)	(Football Federation of Kosovo) Liria Prizren
	MF	Erdogan Brando	19 May 1985 (aged 20)	(Football Federation of Macedonia) Bashkimi
	MF	Dukagjin Gashi	7 October 1985 (aged 20)	(Football Federation of Kosovo) Besa Pejë
	MF	Mensur Limani	5 December 1985 (aged 19)	(Football Federation of Kosovo) Drita
	MF	Fitim Krusha	26 December 1985 (aged 19)	(Football Federation of Kosovo) Liria Prizren
	FW	Ismet Ramushi	16 November 1979 (aged 25)	(Football Federation of Kosovo) Besiana
	FW	Shpëtim Hasani	10 August 1982 (aged 23)	(Swedish Football Association) Degerfors
	FW	Uliks Emra	27 July 1983 (aged 22)	(Football Federation of Kosovo) Prishtina

== Table and results ==
=== Table ===
Team	Pld	W	D	L	GF	GA	GD	Pts
Northern Cyprus	2	2	0	0	7	2	+5	6
Kosovo	2	1	0	1	4	2	+2	3
Sápmi	2	0	0	2	3	10	−7	0

=== Results ===
2 November 2005 1	Northern Cyprus	1–0	Kosovo	North Nicosia, Northern Cyprus
	Tarik 57'	NFT Report; RSSSF Report		Stadium: Nicosia Atatürk Stadium; Referee: Mehmet Malek (Northern Cyprus)

3 November 2005 2	Kosovo	4–1	Sápmi	Girne, Northern Cyprus
	Hasani 39' (pen.); Brando 55'; Nallbani 59'; Ramushi 78'	Report	Johanssen 79'	Stadium: 20 Temmuz Stadium; Attendance: 200

4 November 2005 3	Northern Cyprus	6–2	Sápmi	North Nicosia, Northern Cyprus
	Yasin 12', 35', 50'; Uçaner 83', 90+3'; Ugur 88'	Report	Anders 15'; Johanssen 59'	Stadium: Nicosia Atatürk Stadium; Referee: Bengü Topaloğlu (Northern Cyprus)

== See also ==
- Non-FIFA football
