= Trond Olsen =

Norwegian footballer (born 1984)

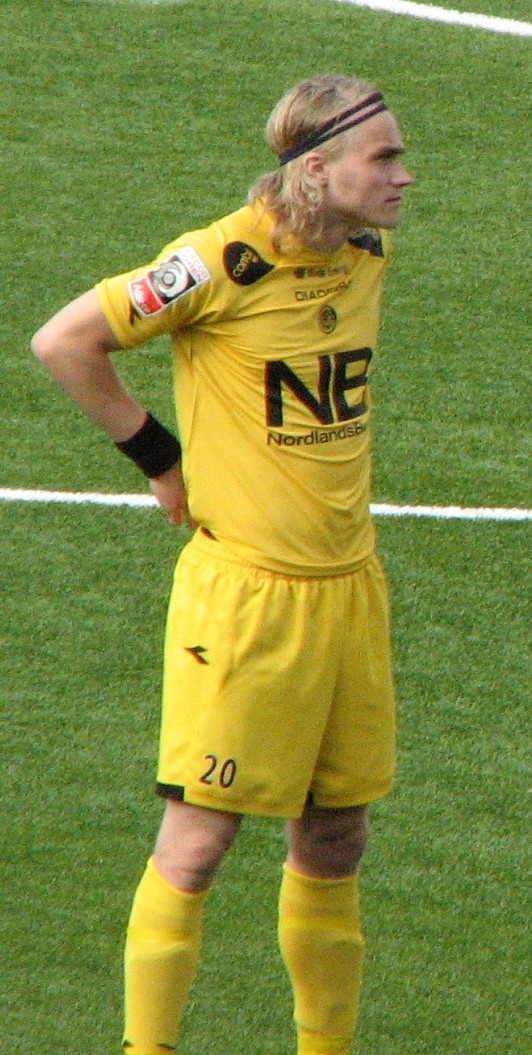
- Olsen with Bodø/Glimt

Personal information
- Date of birth: 5 February 1984 (age 42)
- Place of birth: Lyngen, Norway
- Height: 1.73 m (5 ft 8 in)
- Position: Winger

Team information
- Current team: Værøy
- Number: 19

Youth career
- Lyngen/Karnes

Senior career*
Years	Team	Apps	(Gls)
2001–2008	Bodø/Glimt	156	(37)
2006	Lillestrøm	4	(0)
2009–2011	Rosenborg	65	(14)
2011–2014	Viking	60	(15)
2014–2018	Bodø/Glimt	124	(34)
2018–2019	Sogndal	4	(0)
2021–	Værøy	45	(64)

International career
2003–2005	Norway U-21	11	(3)
2008	Norway	1	(0)
2006	Sápmi	4	(5)

Managerial career
- 2021–: Værøy (player-manager)
- * Club domestic league appearances and goals

Trond Olsen (born 5 February 1984) is a Norwegian former professional footballer who played as a winger.

== Club career ==
Born in Lyngen Municipality in Troms county, Norway, the left-footed former under-21 international was picked up by Lillestrøm SK after the 2005 relegation of his former team Bodø/Glimt. Olsen returned to Bodø/Glimt later in the same year.

In 2006 Olsen played for the Sápmi football team in the unofficial VIVA World Cup for the non-members of the FIFA or the UEFA organizations.

In the 2007 Norwegian Cup, Olsen scored four goals. In 2007, Bodø/Glimt promoted to the top division. The following season, he scored 10 goals in the league and had 14 assists. Olsen transferred to Rosenborg before the 2009 season. He joined Viking in August 2011.

On 23 January 2014, he returned to Bodø/Glimt on a three-year contract. Olsen signed with Sogndal on 15 August 2018, after failing to play for the first team.

On 1 February 2019, it was announced that Olsen's contract with Sogndal had been terminated by mutual consent. On 29 December 2019, it was announced that Olsen was retiring from football.

== International career ==
Olsen was capped eleven times by the Norway U21 national team between 2003 and 2005, and he made his international debut for the Norway senior national team against Ukraine in 2008.

He also made four appearances and scored five goals for the Sápmi football team which won the 2006 VIVA World Cup.

== Career statistics ==
=== Club ===
Appearances and goals by club, season and competition
Club	Season	League			National cup		Continental		Total	
Club	Season	Division	Apps	Goals	Apps	Goals	Apps	Goals	Apps	Goals
Bodø/Glimt	2001	Tippeligaen	3	1	0	0	–		3	1
Bodø/Glimt	2002	Tippeligaen	20	1	3	1	–		23	2
Bodø/Glimt	2003	Tippeligaen	14	1	6	1	–		20	2
Bodø/Glimt	2004	Tippeligaen	23	3	4	4	4	0	31	7
Bodø/Glimt	2005	Tippeligaen	24	3	2	0	–		26	3
Bodø/Glimt	2006	Adeccoligaen	17	7	3	2	–		20	9
Bodø/Glimt	2007	Adeccoligaen	29	11	2	4	–		31	15
Bodø/Glimt	2008	Tippeligaen	26	10	5	4	–		31	14
Bodø/Glimt	Total		156	37	25	16	4	0	185	53
Lillestrøm	2006	Tippeligaen	4	0	0	0	–		4	0
Rosenborg	2009	Tippeligaen	29	8	5	4	4	1	38	13
Rosenborg	2010	Tippeligaen	24	4	4	4	8	0	36	8
Rosenborg	2011	Tippeligaen	12	2	4	3	4	1	20	6
Rosenborg	Total		65	14	13	11	16	2	94	27
Viking	2011	Tippeligaen	7	1	1	0	–		8	1
Viking	2012	Tippeligaen	24	5	3	1	–		27	6
Viking	2013	Tippeligaen	29	9	3	0	–		32	9
Viking	Total		60	15	7	1	0	0	67	16
Bodø/Glimt	2014	Tippeligaen	28	5	2	1	–		30	6
Bodø/Glimt	2015	Tippeligaen	29	13	2	0	–		31	13
Bodø/Glimt	2016	Tippeligaen	30	6	6	3	–		36	9
Bodø/Glimt	2017	OBOS-ligaen	27	10	1	0	–		28	10
Bodø/Glimt	2018	Eliteserien	10	0	3	1	–		13	1
Bodø/Glimt	Total		124	34	14	5	0	0	138	39
Sogndal	2018	OBOS-ligaen	4	0	0	0	–		4	0
Career total			413	100	59	33	20	2	492	135

== Honours ==
Rosenborg

- Tippeligaen: 2009, 2010
