= Jirijoonas Kanth =

Finnish footballer

Personal information
- Date of birth: 16 June 1987 (age 39)
- Height: 1.80 m (5 ft 11 in)
- Position: Midfielder

College career
Years	Team	Apps	(Gls)
2007	Kentucky Wildcats		

Senior career*
Years	Team	Apps	(Gls)
–2011	HIFK	18	(1)
2012	FC Viikingit	21	(0)
2013	HIFK	16	(1)
2014	SoVo	18	(1)
2015–2017	FC Kiffen 08	54	(0)
2018	HIFK	2	(0)
2018	→ HIFK II (loan)	10	(1)
Total		139	(4)

International career
2014	Sápmi	2	(1)

Managerial career
- HIFK (women)
- * Club domestic league appearances and goals

Jirijoonas Kanth (born 16 June 1987) is a Finnish former footballer who last played as a midfielder for HIFK.

== Early life ==
Kanth started playing football at the age of five. His great-grandmother is Sami. He was childhood friends with Finland international Perparim Hetemaj.

== College career ==
Kanth attended the University of Helsinki's Teacher Education Institute.

== Club career ==
Kanth started his career with Finnish side HIFK, where he was regarded as an important player for the club. He was suspended for four games due to alleged racist behavior. The decision was later overturned. After that, he signed for Finnish side FC Kiffen 08. Before the 2018 season, he returned to Finnish side HIFK. He helped the club earn promotion to the Finnish top flight before retiring.

== International career ==
Kanth played for the Sápmi football team at the 2014 ConIFA World Football Cup, where he was regarded as the team's most important player. He was one of few Finnish players to play for the Sapmi team. He previously represented Finland internationally at youth level.

== Managerial career ==
Kanth is a qualified teacher and worked as manager of the HIFK women's team after retiring from professional football.

== Style of play ==
Kanth mainly operates as a midfielder and has operated as left-back.

== Personal life ==
He is of Sami descent but does not speak the language. He is from Utsjoki, Finland. He is nicknamed "Innu". He has two sisters and two brothers.
