= Kosovo National Stadium =

Football stadium in Drenas, Kosovo

- Stadiumi Kombëtar i Kosovës
- Arena Dardane (Dardanian Arena)
- Location: Drenas, Kosovo
- Owner: Football Federation of Kosovo
- Operator: Kosovo national football team
- Capacity: 30,000 (planned)
- Surface: Hybrid grass
- Scoreboard: LED

Construction
- Built: TBD
- Opened: TBD
- Cost: €50 million
- Architect: Murat Tabanlıoğlu

Tenant
- Kosovo national football team

Kosovo National Stadium (Albanian: Stadiumi Kombëtar i Kosovës) is a proposed football stadium in Drenas, Kosovo. This proposed stadium would be the new home of the Kosovo national team and it would serve as a venue for major football club cup finals and other sports and non-sports related activities.

The stadium was designed with a capacity to seat 30,000 spectators, making it the highest capacity football stadium in Kosovo. The stadium was planned to be completed by 2021.

== Location ==
In 2019, the Government of Kosovo has decided that this stadium will be built near Drenas, approving the request of Minister of Culture, Youth and Sports, Kujtim Gashi. The location is 14 kilometers away from capital city of Pristina, rejecting the option selected by the previous government, which was Bërnica. The national stadium will be built on a 25-hectare (62-acre) site in Sankoc, and work should have begun in 2020. There was a lot of debate about the stadium, calling it a political decision, as it was originally planned to be built in Bërnica.

== History ==
=== Planning and construction ===
On 12 July 2019, the construction of stadium began, and two days later the project of this stadium was presented which would have a capacity of 30,000 seats, but after the presentation, the construction was suspended for political reasons related to the location.

== Delays ==
The construction of Kosovo's national stadium has faced multiple delays due to several factors:

1. Funding Issues: The Kosovo government has faced difficulties in securing sufficient funds to cover the estimated costs of the stadium project. The project has been delayed several times as authorities seek alternative sources of funding, including through international loans or partnerships.

2. Land and Planning Problems: The location for the national stadium has been a point of debate and dispute, with challenges in land acquisition, permits, and planning approvals. Choosing a suitable site and meeting all legal and environmental requirements has contributed to the slow progress.

3. Political Instability: Kosovo has experienced periods of political instability, which has affected large-scale infrastructure projects. Government changes and the prioritization of other national issues have delayed the focus on the stadium project.

4. Economic Priorities: Kosovo, being a developing country, has had to prioritize other more urgent economic issues and social programs. Allocating significant resources to a stadium, which is seen by some as non-essential compared to education, healthcare, and employment, has slowed down the process.

These factors combined have delayed the start of the construction of the Kosovo national stadium, despite the initial plans to have it built to meet UEFA and FIFA standards.

== Naming ==
There were a lot of ideas and propositions for naming the new stadium. One of the main proposals was Arena Dardane (Dardanian Arena), however there isn't still anything official about the name of the stadium which is currently referred as Kosovo National Stadium.

== Facilities ==
Based on the plans presented by Tabanlıoğlu Architects, Kosovo National Stadium will have:

- Training grounds
- Retail
- Parking
- Nursery
- Museum
- Library
- Indoor swimming pool
- Hotel
