= Xhevdet Llumnica =

Kosovo Albanian footballer

Personal information
- Full name: Xhevdet Llumnica
- Date of birth: 24 June 1979 (age 47)
- Place of birth: Pristina, SAP Kosovo, SFR Yugoslavia
- Height: 1.80 m (5 ft 11 in)
- Position: Striker

Youth career
- 1991–2001: KF Kosova Prishtinë

Senior career*
Years	Team	Apps	(Gls)
2001–2003	Drita		
2003–2004	Prishtina		
2004	Tidaholms GIF	3	(0)
2005	Kalmar FF	2	(0)
2006	Husqvarna FF	42	(13)
2007–2010	Assyriska FF	87	(27)
2011–2013	IF Limhamn Bunkeflo	54	(11)
2011–2013	Prespa Birlik		

International career
2002	Kosovo	1	(0)
- * Club domestic league appearances and goals as of 25 November 2013

Xhevdet Llumnica^{[a]} (born 24 June 1979) is a Kosovo Albanian retired footballer, who played for Limhamn Bunkeflo.

He was born in Pristina, at the time SAP Kosovo, SR Serbia, SFR Yugoslavia. Llumnica is a striker that played for several clubs in Kosovo and Sweden.

== International career ==
He also played one game for the Kosovo national team in 2002.

== Notes ==
a.	Albanian spelling: Xhevdet Llumnica, Serbo-Croat spelling: Dževdet Lumnica, Џевдет Лумница.
