= Skånland OIF =

Norwegian football club

- Full name: Skånland og Omegn Idrettsforening
- Founded: 20 November 1934
- Ground: Skånland idrettspark, Evenskjer
- League: Fourth Division
- 2024: 3rd

Skånland og Omegn Idrettsforening is a Norwegian multi-sports club from Skånland, Tjeldsund. The club has sections for association football, futsal, archery and wrestling.

The club was founded in 1970 as a merger of Skånland og Omegn FK, Skånland IL and Kjønna IL. With the oldest of these clubs being Kjønna IL, founded as Kjønna AIL on 20 November 1934, this was henceforth counted as Skånland OIF's foundation date. The team colours are white and black.

The club formerly had sections for Nordic skiing, swimming, orienteering and volleyball. A separate club Skånland SK was founded in 1997 with sections for skiing and swimming.

At the time of Skånland OIF's 50th anniversary, the skier Ingmund Holtås was regarded as their most successful member. Later, Norway international footballer Tom Høgli started his career in Skånland OIF. After retiring as a professional footballer, Høgli has played futsal for Skånland.

The men's football team currently plays in the Fourth Division, the fifth tier of football in Norway.

The team was a mainstay in the Third Division from 1994 to 2010. Winning its Fourth Division group in 2019, and following the COVID-related cancellation of the 2020 Third Division, the team played in the Third Division in 2021 but were relegated. Following re-promotion in 2022 they were relegated back in 2023.

The team reached the first round of the Norwegian Cup in 2002, losing 0–15 to Rosenborg; 2019, losing 0–3 to Harstad; and 2021, losing 0–11 to Tromsø.

The women's football team currently plays in the Third Division.
