= Steffen Nystrøm =

Norwegian footballer (born 1984)

Personal information
- Full name: Steffen Nystrøm
- Date of birth: 1 July 1984 (age 42)
- Place of birth: Vadsø, Norway
- Height: 1.80 m (5 ft 11 in)
- Positions: Midfielder; striker

Team information
- Current team: Kløfta

Senior career*
Years	Team	Apps	(Gls)
2004	Norild IL		
2005–2007	Moss	68	(21)
2007–2011	Strømsgodset	39	(5)
2011–2013	Tromsø	54	(9)
2014–2016	Fredrikstad	35	(6)
2017–	Kløfta	14	(13)

International career^{‡}
2006	Sápmi	3	(6)
- * Club domestic league appearances and goals as of 2 November 2017 ‡ National team caps and goals as of 18 June 2014

Steffen Nystrøm (born 1 July 1984) is a Norwegian football striker.

He played for Norild IL, Moss FK, Strømsgodset and Tromsø before joining Fredrikstad.

Being part Sápmi, Nystrøm was joint top goalscorer, beside Eirik Lamøy and Tom Høgli, of the 2006 VIVA World Cup with six goals.

In 2017 he settled in Borgen, Ullensaker and joined the fifth-tier club Kløfta IL. From 2018 he was also Kløfta IL's managing director.

== Career statistics ==
As of 2 November 2016

Season	Club	Division	League		Cup		Total	
Season	Club	Division	Apps	Goals	Apps	Goals	Apps	Goals
2005	Moss	Adeccoligaen	25	11	0	0	25	11
2006	Moss	Adeccoligaen	26	7	1	1	27	8
2007	Moss	Adeccoligaen	17	3	1	1	18	4
2007	Strømsgodset	Tippeligaen	7	0	1	1	8	1
2008	Strømsgodset	Tippeligaen	20	4	5	3	25	7
2009	Strømsgodset	Tippeligaen	12	1	1	1	13	2
2010	Strømsgodset	Tippeligaen	0	0	0	0	0	0
2011	Tromsø	Tippeligaen	24	4	4	0	28	4
2012	Tromsø	Tippeligaen	17	2	4	2	21	4
2013	Tromsø	Tippeligaen	13	3	2	2	15	5
2014	Fredrikstad	1. divisjon	23	5	2	0	25	5
2015	Fredrikstad	OBOS-ligaen	11	1	2	2	13	3
2016	Fredrikstad	OBOS-ligaen	1	0	0	0	1	0
Career Total			196	41	23	13	219	54
