= Espen Minde =

Norwegian footballer (born 1983)

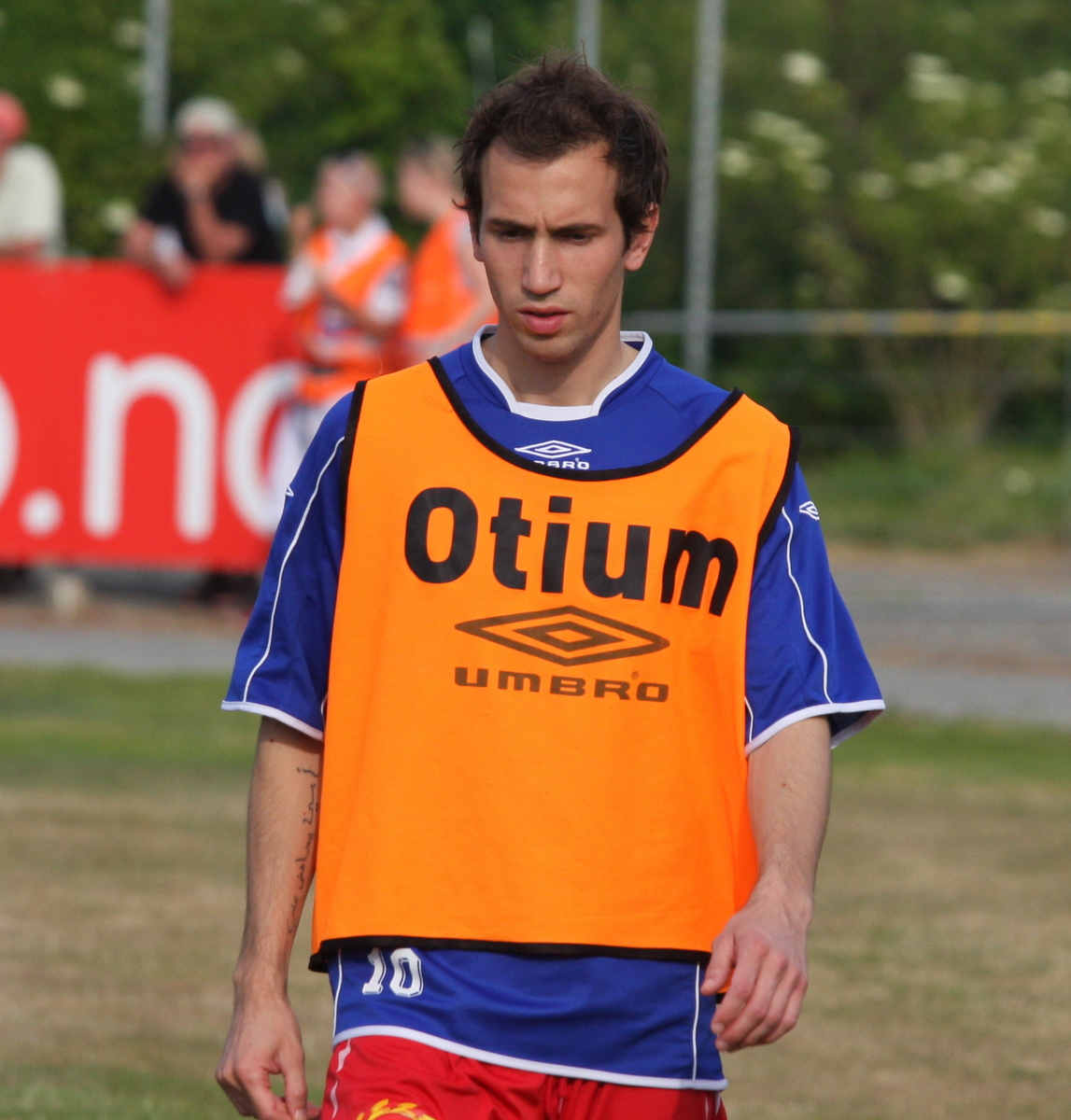

Personal information
- Date of birth: 16 May 1983 (age 43)
- Place of birth: Tromsø, Norway
- Height: 1.70 m (5 ft 7 in)
- Position: Striker

Team information
- Current team: Tromsdalen
- Number: 10

Senior career*
Years	Team	Apps	(Gls)
2002–2005	Tromsø	15	(3)
2004	→ Raufoss (loan)	14	(0)
2005	→ Bodens BK (loan)	14	(1)
2006–2007	Tromsdalen	49	(5)
2008	Løv-Ham	2	(0)
2009–	Tromsdalen	21	(0)

International career
- Norway U-21
2002–2006	Sápmi	8	(1)
- * Club domestic league appearances and goals as of 13 April 2008

Espen Minde (born 16 May 1983) is a Norwegian football midfielder who currently plays for Tromsdalen UIL.

A former u-21 international for Norway, Minde started his senior career in Tromsø IL and featured with them in the Norwegian Premier League. He failed to break through, although he in 2003 was near a transfer to K.A.A. Gent after impressing during a trial. Instead, he spent time on loan at Bodens BK and Raufoss. He later joined Tromsdalen UIL, and then Løv-Ham in November 2007, ahead of the 2008 season. In January 2009 he went on trial at FC Wil 1900.

Minde is left-footed.
