= Ilir Nallbani =

Kosovar footballer (born 1982)

Personal information
- Date of birth: 11 July 1982 (age 44)
- Place of birth: Peć, SFR Yugoslavia
- Height: 1.81 m (5 ft 11 in)
- Position: Central midfielder

Team information
- Current team: Kosovo U15 (manager)

Youth career
- 1992: Vallsta IF
- 1992–2003: Besa Pejë

Senior career*
Years	Team	Apps	(Gls)
2003–2005	Besa Pejë	50	(7)
2006	Tatabánya	3	(0)
2006–2007	Elbasani	33	(2)
2007–2011	Vllaznia	103	(5)
2011–2012	Trepça	28	(3)
2012–2013	Vllaznia	17	(0)
2013–2014	Liria		
2014–2016	Besa Pejë		

International career
2005–2010	Kosovo	3	(0)
- * Club domestic league appearances and goals

Ilir Nallbani (born 11 July 1982) is a Kosovar Albanian former footballer who played as a midfielder.

== Playing career ==
=== Club ===
Nallbani appeared in the 2008–09 UEFA Cup qualifying round.

=== International ===
He played in three unofficial matches for Kosovo between 2005 and 2010 with his final match being the first for Kosovo since the declaration of independence. They were only granted UEFA Membership in 2016.

== Managerial career ==
After he retired from football in April 2016 he was named as the head coach of SC Besa after Arbnor Morina was sacked.

== Honours ==
Besa Pejë

- Kosovo Superleague: 2004–05
- Kosovar Cup: 2004–05, 2015–16
