= Olav Råstad =

Norwegian footballer (born 1979)

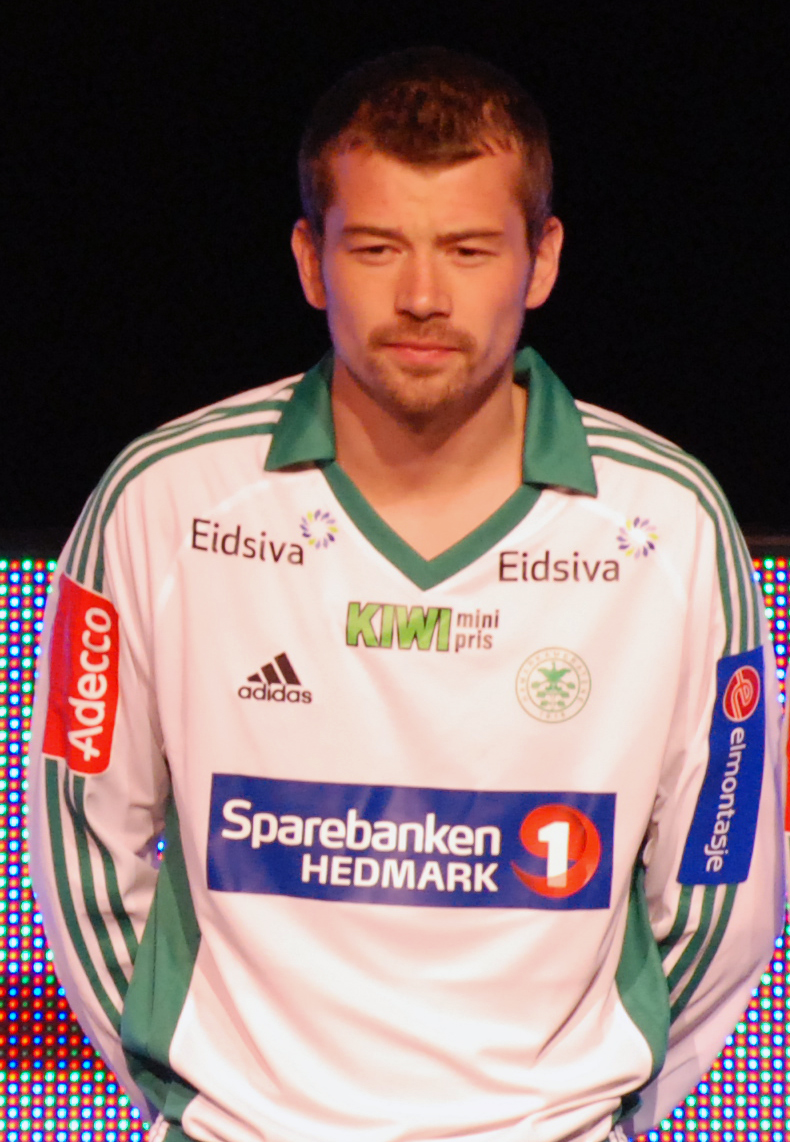

Personal information
- Full name: Olav Råstad
- Date of birth: February 2, 1979 (age 47)
- Place of birth: Harstad, Norway
- Height: 1.86 m (6 ft 1 in)
- Position: Midfielder

Senior career*
Years	Team	Apps	(Gls)
1999–2001	Tromsø	51	(3)
2002–2009	Bodø/Glimt	124	(12)
2009	Hamarkameratene	20	(3)
2010–2012	Steinkjer		

International career^{‡}
2006	Sápmi	3	(4)
- * Club domestic league appearances and goals as of 3 August 2012 ‡ National team caps and goals as of 18 June 2014

Olav Råstad (born 2 February 1979) is a Norwegian football midfielder.

Born in Harstad, he started his career in Harstad IL, joined Norwegian Premier League team Tromsø in 1999 and Bodø/Glimt in 2002.
