= Kosovo national football team =

Men's national association football team representing Kosovo

Kosovo
- Nickname: Dardanët (Dardanians)
- Association: Football Federation of Kosovo (FFK)
- Confederation: UEFA (Europe)
- Head coach: Franco Foda
- Captain: Vedat Muriqi
- Most caps: Mërgim Vojvoda (81)
- Top scorer: Vedat Muriqi (33)
- Home stadium: Fadil Vokrri Stadium
- FIFA code: KOS
First colours	Second colours

FIFA ranking
- Current: 78 ▼2 (18 November 2026)
- Highest: 76 (October 2026)
- Lowest: 190 (July–August 2016)

First international
- Unofficial Albania 3–1 Kosovo (Tirana, Albania; 14 February 1993); Official Kosovo 0–0 Haiti (Mitrovica, Kosovo; 5 March 2014)

Biggest win
- Unofficial Monaco 1–7 Kosovo (Cap d'Ail, France; 22 April 2006); Official Malta 0–5 Kosovo (Ta' Qali, Malta; 17 November 2018) Kosovo 5–0 Burkina Faso (Pristina, Kosovo; 24 March 2022)

Biggest defeat
- Kosovo 0–6 Croatia (Shkodër, Albania; 6 October 2016)

The Kosovo national football team (Albanian: Kombëtarja e futbollit të Kosovës; Serbian: Фудбалска репрезентација Косова, romanized: Fudbalska reprezentacija Kosova) represents Kosovo in men's international football. The team is controlled by the Football Federation of Kosovo, the governing body for football in Kosovo, and is under the jurisdiction of FIFA globally.

== History ==
=== Pre-independence ===
==== First match ====
On 29 November 1942, Kosovo for first time in its history played a friendly match as part of the celebrations for 30th Anniversary of the Independence of Albania against Tirana, (Note: The alternative name of the Albania national team that was used during this match.) and the match ended with a 2–0 away defeat. The starting line-up of that match was Mustafa Daci (GK), Ballanca, Ahmet Zaimi, Mazllum Xërxa, Veseli, Hajdar Hamza, Nebil Dylatahu, Ramadan Vraniqi, Dobrica Barbaroga, (Note: Dobrica Barbaroga was the Albanianized full name of Dobrica Barbarogić by the media of that time, which may have been expression of peaceful coexistence with national minorities in Kosovo at that time.) Bajrami and Henci.

==== Yugoslav era ====
"The purpose of this friendly match is that we wanted to face a team that has the same temperament and character as Albania national team."

— The reasoning of the then head coach of Yugoslavia, Rajko Mitić for the reason for organizing the Kosovo–Yugoslavia match.

On 8 November 1967, Kosovo for first time as autonomous province of SFR Yugoslavia played a friendly match against Yugoslavia and the match ended with a 3–3 home draw. The starting line-up of that match was a mix between Albanian and Serbian players as Milosavlević, Stevanović, Mušikić, Abrashi, S. Džukić, V. Džukić, Brovina, Hatibi, Radović, Prekazi and Pindović. For Yugoslavia, this match it was preparation before the UEFA Euro 1968 qualifying match against Albania.

Yugoslav squads at international competitions often included players from Kosovo, such as Fadil Vokrri and Stevan Stojanović. Three other footballers from Kosovo, Fahrudin Jusufi, Milutin Šoškić and Vladimir Durković, were part of the Yugoslav team that won the gold medal at the 1960 Summer Olympics and silver medal at the 1960 European Nations' Cup.

==== After breakup of Yugoslavia ====
On 20 January 1993, The Football Federation of Kosovo signed a cooperation protocol with the Albanian Football Association and in the framework of this protocol it was decided to play on 14 February a friendly match between Albania and Kosovo, which was the first match of Kosovo following the breakup of Yugoslavia. This match ended with a 1–3 defeat. The starting line-up of that match was Ahmet Beselica (GK), Ardian Kozniku, Bardhec Seferi, Fadil Berisha, Gani Llapashtica, Genc Hoxha, Isa Sadriu, Kushtrim Munishi, Muharrem Sahiti, Sadullah Ajeti and Selajdin Jerliu.

==== During UN administration ====
"I am very pleased with the team's performance even though we had predicted a stronger opponent. However, I want to emphasize that our players have been fantastic. The fact that we do not play many international matches may have inspired the players to give it their all this time."

— Opinion of the then coach Muharrem Sahiti after the match against Monaco.

On 7 September 2002, Kosovo for first time after the Kosovo War played a friendly match against Albania and the match ended with a 0–1 home defeat. The starting line-up of that match was Ahmet Beselica (GK), Ardian Kozniku, Arsim Abazi, Besnik Kollari, Fadil Ademi, Faruk Statovci, Ismet Munishi, Mehmet Dragusha, Sunaj Keqi, Xhevdet Llumnica and Zenun Selimi.

On 15 June 2007, Kosovo won 1–0 over Saudi Arabia. It was the first time that Kosovo played against a team that has taken part in the FIFA World Cup. The winning goal was scored by Kristian Nushi from the penalty kick on the 84th minute. On 22 April 2006, Kosovo achieved their biggest win, defeating Monaco 7–1. If one included matches played before Kosovo became a FIFA member, this scoreline is their best result yet.

=== After declaration of independence ===
On 6 May 2008, after its declaration of independence from Serbia, Kosovo applied for FIFA membership. On 24 October 2008, Kosovo's application was discussed at the FIFA Congress in Zürich and Kosovo's bid was rejected. At the occasion, FIFA determined Kosovo could not play friendly matches against FIFA members' national teams.

On 17 February 2010, for the first time since its declaration of independence, Kosovo played an unofficial friendly match against Albania, which ended with a 2–3 home defeat for Kosovo. The starting line-up of that match was Kushtrim Mushica (GK), Anel Rashkaj, Dukagjin Gashi, Enis Zabërgja, Fisnik Papuçi, Ilir Nallbani, Liridon Kukaj, Robert Gjeraj, Shpëtim Hasani and Yll Hoxha. This match had a charity character as the profits gathered from this meeting went to those affected by floods in Shkodër.

In September 2012, Albania international Lorik Cana, along with Swiss internationals Granit Xhaka, Valon Behrami and Xherdan Shaqiri, all of them with Kosovo Albanian origin, wrote a declaration to FIFA President Sepp Blatter, asking him to allow Kosovo to play friendly matches. The declaration was also signed by eight other Albanian footballers hailing from Kosovo as Ahmed Januzi, Alban Meha, Armend Dallku, Burim Kukeli, Etrit Berisha, Fatmire Bajramaj, Mërgim Mavraj and Samir Ujkani. Some players, especially Kosovo Serbs as Milan Biševac and Miloš Krasić, continued to play for Serbia.

==== Permission by FIFA to play friendlies ====

Kosovo starting line-up in first international friendly against Haiti
(4–3–3)

On 6 February 2013, FIFA decided to allow Kosovan club teams to play friendly games against clubs from countries whose national teams were members of FIFA. However, it was stipulated that Kosovan clubs and teams could not display national symbols such as the Kosovan flag, emblem, etc., or play the Kosovan anthem.

On 5 March 2014, the Kosovan football team was allowed by FIFA to play its first international friendly match, against Haiti; the match ended in a 0–0 draw. Before the match, some players of Kosovo posed with guns at a shooting range, causing a stir in Serbia. On the eve of the match, supporters of Kosovo burned the flag of Serbia. This incident prompted the Football Association of Serbia to request that FIFA revoked Kosovo's right to play international friendlies.

After the match against Haiti, six more matches were held in 2014, against Turkey, Senegal, Oman, Equatorial Guinea and Albania. The first win in these friendlies was against Oman, by 1–0, while the biggest defeat a 1–6 against Turkey.

==== Membership in UEFA and FIFA ====
In September 2015, at an UEFA Executive Committee meeting in Malta, the request from Kosovo for admission in UEFA was scheduled for deliberation in the next Ordinary Congress, to be held in Budapest. On 3 May 2016, at the Ordinary Congress, Kosovo was accepted into UEFA after members voted 28–24 in favor of Kosovo. Ten days later, Kosovo was accepted in FIFA during their 66th Congress in Mexico, with 141 votes in favour and 23 against.

Kosovo began to make their debut in the 2018 FIFA World Cup qualification, where Kosovo played in Group I with Croatia, Finland, Iceland, Turkey and Ukraine. In their first game, the Kosovars held host Finland to a 1–1 draw, but lost the remaining games and finished last in the group.

Kosovo's most used starting line-up during their fifteen-match unbeaten run (4–3–3)

Following the failure to qualify for 2018 FIFA World Cup, Kosovo participated in the 2018–19 UEFA Nations League D sharing group with Azerbaijan, Faroe Islands and Malta, where the Kosovars topped their group undefeated. After the successful Nations League, Kosovo entered the UEFA Euro 2020 qualifying, where they shared Group A with Bulgaria, Czech Republic, Montenegro and 2018 World Cup fourth place finisher England. Of eight matches, Kosovo won three times, against Bulgaria, Montenegro, and the Czech Republic, and finished third in the group. Their 5–3 loss to England on 10 September ended Kosovo's longest unbeaten run of 15 matches spanning nearly two years. Although Kosovo failed go qualify directly, they advanced to the qualifying play-offs because they had won their Nations League group. Kosovo was drawn against North Macedonia in the play-off semi-final, which they lost 1–2 in Skopje.

In following competitions, Kosovo had less success. In the 2020–21 UEFA Nations League, Kosovo finished third with 5 points out of 6 matches, avoiding relegation. In the qualification campaign for the 2022 FIFA World Cup in Qatar, Kosovo finished last. In the 2022–23 UEFA Nations League, Kosovo showed signs of improvement. The team finished second in its League C group, registering wins against Cyprus, Northern Ireland, and losing to Greece. During the UEFA Euro 2024 qualifying, Kosovo was placed in a group with Andorra, Belarus, Israel, Romania and Switzerland. Kosovo concluded the campaign in fourth place with 11 points out of 10 matches, missing out on qualification.

In the 2024–25 UEFA Nations League, Kosovo competed in Group C2, alongside Cyprus, Lithuania and Romania. The national team began the campaign with a home defeat to Romania but responded with several victories, including two wins over Cyprus and an away win against Lithuania. The return match against Romania, held on 15 November 2024 in Bucharest, was abandoned and later awarded as a 3–0 forfeit loss to Kosovo. The decision came after tensions escalated during the match, involving clashes between players and fans, object-throwing, and physical altercations on the pitch, leading UEFA to end the game prematurely and issue disciplinary action. Kosovo finished second in the group with 13 points, securing a spot in the promotion play-offs to League B.

==== Promotion to League B and 2026 World Cup qualifying campaign ====
In March 2025, Kosovo faced Iceland in the promotion play-offs over two legs as part of the 2024–25 UEFA Nations League play-offs. The first leg, played at home in Pristina on 20 March 2025, ended in a 2–1 victory for Kosovo. Three days later, Kosovo secured a 3–1 win in the return leg on neutral ground in Murcia, resulting in a 5–2 aggregate score and ensuring promotion to League B of the UEFA Nations League for the first time in its history.

In June 2025, Kosovo played two friendly matches at home, recording victories 5–2 against Armenia, and 4–2 against Comoros, continuing their strong attacking form.

Kosovo then began their 2026 FIFA World Cup qualification campaign in September 2025. The team opened with a 0–4 away defeat to Switzerland in Basel, before responding with a 2–0 home win over Sweden in Pristina. In October 2025, Kosovo drew goalless at home against Slovenia, and followed it with a 1–0 away victory over Sweden in Gothenburg. The campaign concluded in November 2025 with two further positive results, as Kosovo defeated Slovenia 2–0 away in Ljubljana, securing advancement to the play-offs, and drew 1–1 at home against Switzerland.

On 26 March 2026, Kosovo defeated Slovakia 4–3 in the semi-finals of the 2026 FIFA World Cup qualification play-offs, advancing to their first-ever play-off final, in which they faced Turkey in Pristina, where they lost with a score of 1–0. Had they won, this would have been Kosovo's first participation in a major international tournament since joining FIFA and UEFA 10 years ago.

== Team image ==
=== Nicknames ===
The Kosovo national football team has been known or nicknamed as the "Dardanët" ("Dardanians"). In addition to the official nickname, the Kosovo national team had different nicknames in different periods as:

- "Shqipëria B" ("Albania B") — During the period before 2016, the national teams of Kosovo and Albania have exchanged players with each other, which influenced these two teams to be nicknamed reserve (B) teams of each other, the Kosovo national team was nicknamed Albania B due to many players came to play for Kosovo as they had no space to play for Albania, but the same thing happened with the Albanian national team which was nicknamed Kosovo B due to of the large number of players of Kosovo Albanian descent in its composition.
- "Ekipi i Kosovës" ("Team Kosovo") — The Kosovo national team during the 2009–10 period was introduced with the nickname that was used as an alternative name in order to avoid possible sanctions by UEFA and FIFA against Kosovo and the opponents that Kosovo played. After Kosovo was allowed on 6 February 2013 by FIFA to play against FIFA member associations in international friendlies, this alternative name was no longer used.
- "Brazili i Ballkanit" ("Brazil of the Balkans") — The Kosovo national team was nicknamed the Brazil of the Balkans during their fifteen-match unbeaten run during the 2018–19 season.

=== Kits and crest ===
Kosovo kit in the first competitive match against Finland in September 2016.

The Kosovo national team kits were mostly red and black before the declaration of independence, with occasional variations over the years. After independence, the kits have primarily been blue and yellow. On 5 October 2016, Kosovo signed a four-year contract with the Spanish sportswear company Kelme, becoming the first official kit supplier of Kosovo following the country's membership in UEFA and FIFA. On 5 February 2026, Kosovo signed a two-year contract with the German sportswear company Adidas, making it the national team's current kit supplier.

==== Kit sponsorship ====
Kit supplier	Period	Contract	
Kit supplier	Period	Announcement	Duration
Legea	2014	March 2014	
Puma	2014	May 2014	
Legea	2014	September 2014	
Umbro	2015	October 2015	November 2015
Puma	2016	June 2016	
Kelme	2016–2018	5 October 2016	2016–2020 (4 years)
Fourteen	2018–2022	16 June 2018	2018–2022 (4 years)
Erreà	2023–2026	23 February 2023	2023–2026 (3 years)
Adidas	2026–present	5 February 2026	2026–2028 (2 years)

=== Home stadium ===
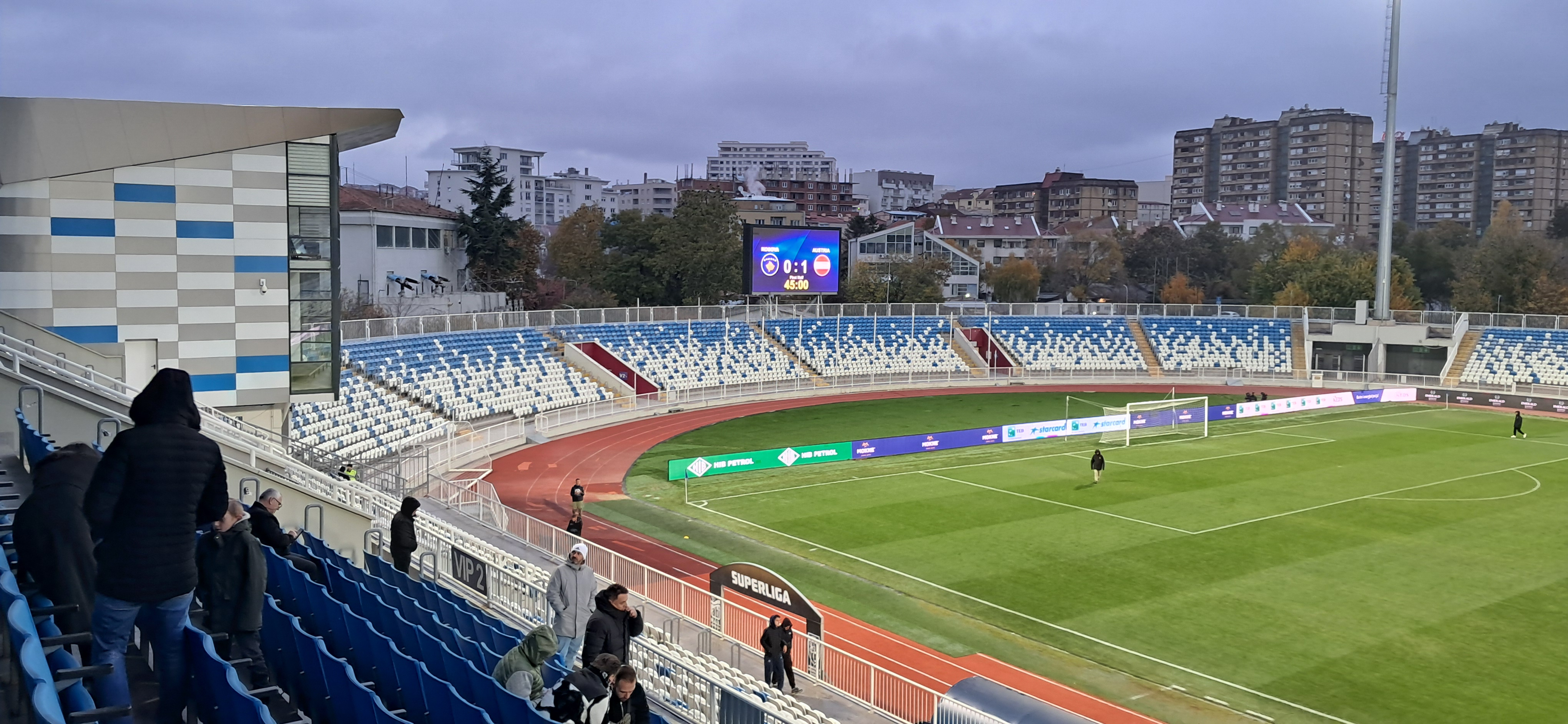
Fadil Vokrri Stadium

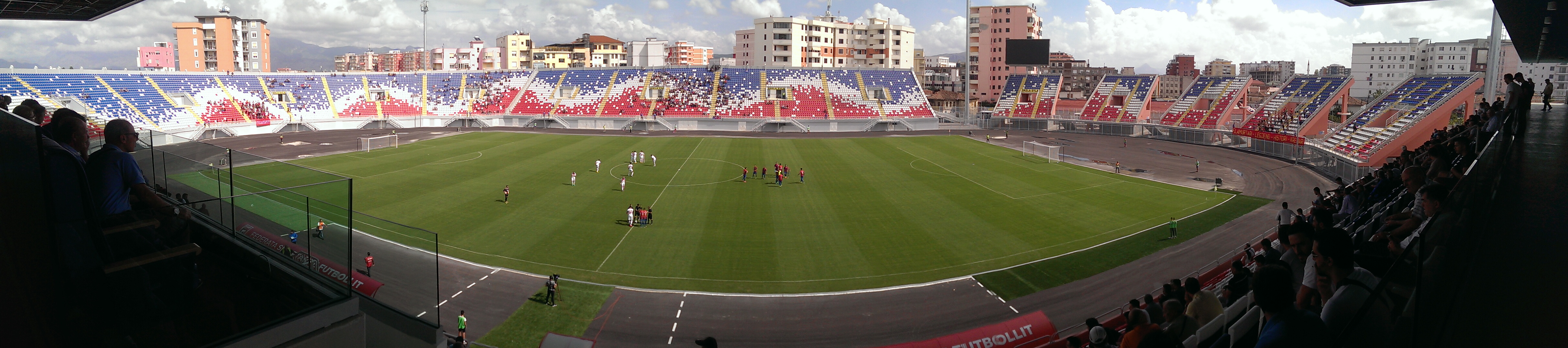
Loro Boriçi Stadium

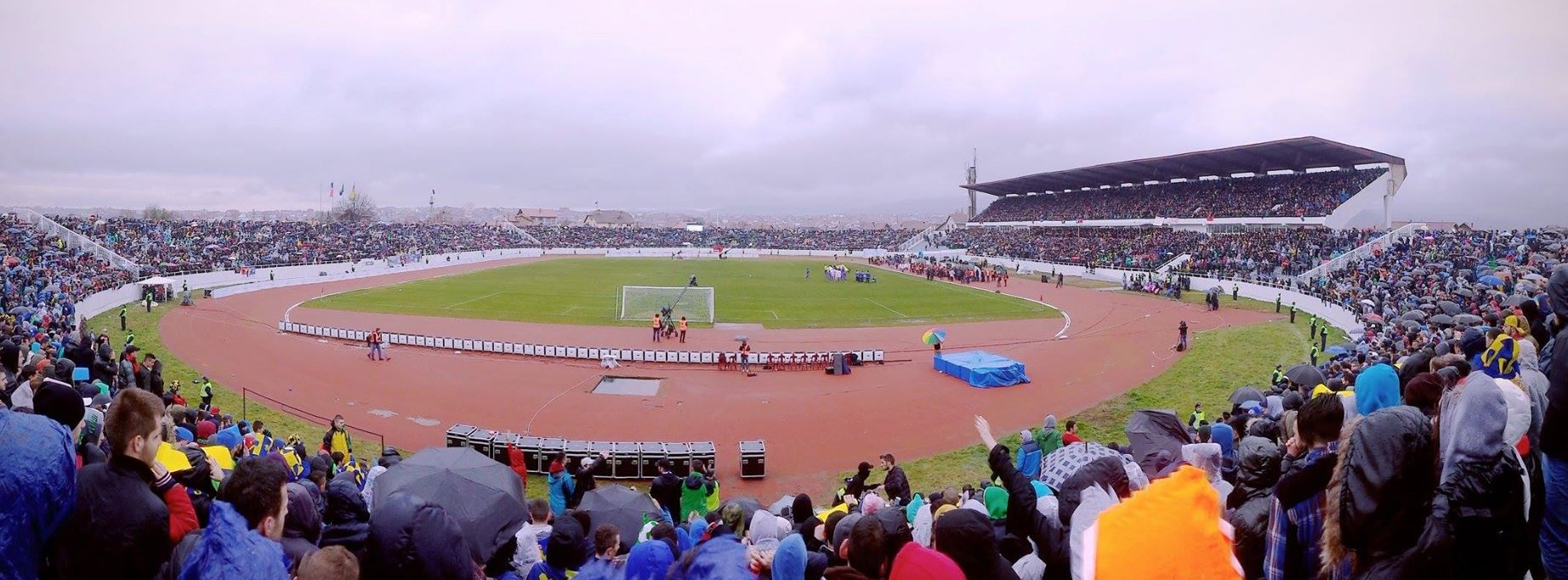
Adem Jashari Olympic Stadium

Kosovo's home stadium is the Fadil Vokrri Stadium. The stadium capacity is 13,500, which makes it the second largest national stadium in Kosovo. Kosovo's previous national stadium was the Adem Jashari Olympic Stadium which is currently under renovation. Kosovo also used Loro Boriçi Stadium during the 2018 FIFA World Cup qualifying campaign, and this happened after the two stadiums in Pristina and Mitrovica at that time were under renovation and do not meet UEFA standards. On 12 July 2019, the construction of Kosovo National Stadium began, and two days later the project of this stadium was presented which would have a capacity of 30,000 seats, but after the presentation, the construction was suspended for political reasons related to the location.

As of 4 October 2026

Kosovo national football team home stadiums
Stadium	Capacity	Location	Pld	W	D	L	Win %	First match		Last match		UEFA category	Ref
Stadium	Capacity	Location	Pld	W	D	L	Win %	Opponent	Date	Opponent	Date	UEFA category	Ref
Fadil Vokrri Stadium	13,500	Pristina, Kosovo	49	23	13	13	46.94	Yugoslavia	8 November 1967	Austria	4 October 2026	4/4 stars	
Loro Boriçi Stadium	16,000	Shkodër, Albania	5	0	0	5	0.00	Croatia	6 October 2016	Ukraine	6 October 2017	4/4 stars	
Adem Jashari Olympic Stadium	18,500	Mitrovica, Kosovo	3	1	1	1	33.33	Haiti	5 March 2014	Latvia	13 November 2017	2/4 stars	

=== Rivalries ===
==== Albania ====
This derby is otherwise known as Brotherly derby (Albanian: Derbi vëllazëror), also known as the Brotherly (Albanian: Vëllazërorja). The documented beginnings of this derby date back to the time during the World War II, respectively on 29 November 1942, where they played a friendly match as part of the celebrations for 30th Anniversary of the Independence of Albania and the match ended with a 2–0 win for Tirana, this derby is back 50 years after the first match, when the Football Federation of Kosovo signed a cooperation protocol with the Albanian Football Association and in the framework of this protocol it was decided to play on 14 February a friendly match between these two national teams, and this match ended with a 3–1 win for Albania.

==== Romania ====
Kosovo and Romania have a tense football rivalry, largely due to Romania's support for Serbia's territorial integrity and has not recognized the legitimacy of Kosovo's independence. The two teams have faced each other several times, with each match resulting in significant controversy. In a September 2023 UEFA Euro 2024 qualifying, Kosovo walked off the pitch in protest after incidents involving Romanian fans, including pro-Serbia chants and banners. The match resumed, but Kosovo's appeal for a 3–0 victory was rejected and Romania won 2–0. In their 2024–25 UEFA Nations League encounters, tensions escalated further with fights on the pitch, object-throwing and clashes between players and fans. The final match was abandoned and Romania was later awarded a 3–0 victory. Both teams faced fines for the incidents and the Football Federation of Kosovo subsequently confirmed they would appeal the decision to the Court of Arbitration for Sport.

==== Switzerland ====
Matches between Kosovo and Switzerland have gained particular significance due to the large Kosovan diaspora in Switzerland and the number of players of Kosovan origin who have represented the Swiss national team. The rivalry has been shaped by controversy surrounding Kosovo's admission to UEFA and FIFA in 2016, when the Swiss Football Association reportedly sought to postpone Kosovo's UEFA membership vote amid concerns over the possible departure of Swiss internationals of Kosovan origin, including Granit Xhaka, Valon Behrami and Xherdan Shaqiri, who all continued representing Switzerland. The association later denied opposing Kosovo's admission, stating that it had supported its membership and proposed a secret ballot to shield delegates from political pressure.

International allegiance has also contributed to tensions surrounding the fixture. Andi Zeqiri initially expressed willingness to represent Kosovo in 2020 but later opted to remain with Switzerland, a decision that drew criticism from Kosovo supporters, who booed him during matches between the teams in Zurich in March 2022 and Pristina in November 2025. Uran Bislimi also switched allegiance, having made two appearances for Kosovo in friendly matches in November 2022 before opting to represent Switzerland in 2023. In contrast, Albian Hajdari and Leon Avdullahu, both former Switzerland youth internationals, chose Kosovo in 2025. Their decisions prompted comments from Swiss captain Granit Xhaka, who questioned whether they would have secured regular places in the Swiss national team and suggested that Avdullahu might have lacked patience, while acknowledging their right to decide. Following these remarks, Xhaka was booed by Kosovo supporters during the teams' match in Pristina in November 2025, with spectators whistling at almost every touch of the ball.

The teams first met at senior level on 29 March 2022 in a friendly that ended 1–1. Subsequent encounters included two draws in the Euro 2024 qualifiers (2–2 and 1–1), a 4–0 Swiss victory in the 2026 World Cup qualifiers on 5 September 2025, and another 1–1 draw in Pristina on 18 November 2025.

== Results and fixtures ==
The following is a list of match results in the last 12 months, as well as any future matches that have been scheduled.

Win Draw Loss Fixture

=== 2026 ===
26 March 2026 World Cup qualification play-offs	Slovakia	3–4	Kosovo	Bratislava, Slovakia
20:45 UTC+1	Valjent 6'; Haraslín 45'; Strelec 90+4'	Report	Hodža 21'; Asllani 47'; Muslija 60'; Hajrizi 72'	Stadium: Tehelné pole Attendance: 20,113; Referee: Espen Eskås (Norway)

31 March 2026 World Cup qualification play-offs	Kosovo	0–1	Turkey	Pristina, Kosovo
20:45		Report	Aktürkoğlu 53'	Stadium: Fadil Vokrri Stadium; Attendance: 12,887; Referee: Michael Oliver (England)

31 May Friendly	Czech Republic	2–1	Kosovo	Prague, Czech Republic
16:00	Ladra 12'; Hložek 32'	Report	Emërllahu 80'	Stadium: Stadion Letná; Attendance: 11,102; Referee: Michal Očenáš (Slovakia)

7 June Friendly	Kosovo	3–0	Andorra	Pristina, Kosovo
20:00	Álvarez 41' (o.g.); Al.Rrahmani 53' (pen.); Matoshi 78'	Report		Stadium: Fadil Vokrri Stadium; Attendance: 5,000; Referee: Juxhin Xhaja (Albania)

24 September 2026–27 Nations League	Kosovo	1–0	Republic of Ireland	Pristina, Kosovo
20:45	Muriqi 83'	Report		Stadium: Fadil Vokrri Stadium; Attendance: 12,627; Referee: Lawrence Visser (Belgium)

27 September 2026–27 Nations League	Austria	3–1	Kosovo	Vienna, Austria
18:00	Affengruber 23'; Adamu 45+2'; Chukwuemeka 61'	Report	Zhegrova 83' (pen.)	Stadium: Ernst-Happel-Stadion; Attendance: 47,000; Referee: Nick Walsh (Scotland)

1 October 2026–27 Nations League	Israel	0–0	Kosovo	Debrecen, Hungary (Note: Due to the Gaza war, Israel are required to play their home matches at neutral venues until further notice.)
20:45 (21:45 UTC+3)		Report		Stadium: Nagyerdei Stadion; Attendance: 440; Referee: Radu Petrescu (Romania)

4 October 2026–27 Nations League	Kosovo	1–1	Austria	Pristina, Kosovo
18:00	Asllani 70'	Report	Lang 85'	Stadium: Fadil Vokrri Stadium; Attendance: 12,567; Referee: António Nobre (Portugal)

14 November 2026–27 Nations League	Kosovo	0–0	Israel	Pristina, Kosovo
15:00		Report		Stadium: Fadil Vokrri Stadium; Attendance: 12,426; Referee: Ivan Kružliak (Slovakia)

17 November 2026–27 Nations League	Republic of Ireland	3–0	Kosovo	Dublin, Ireland
20:45 (19:45 UTC+0)	Parrott 28' (pen.), 50' (pen.); Moylan 75'	Report		Stadium: Aviva Stadium; Attendance: 50,381; Referee: Edgars Maļcevs (Latvia)

== Coaching staff ==
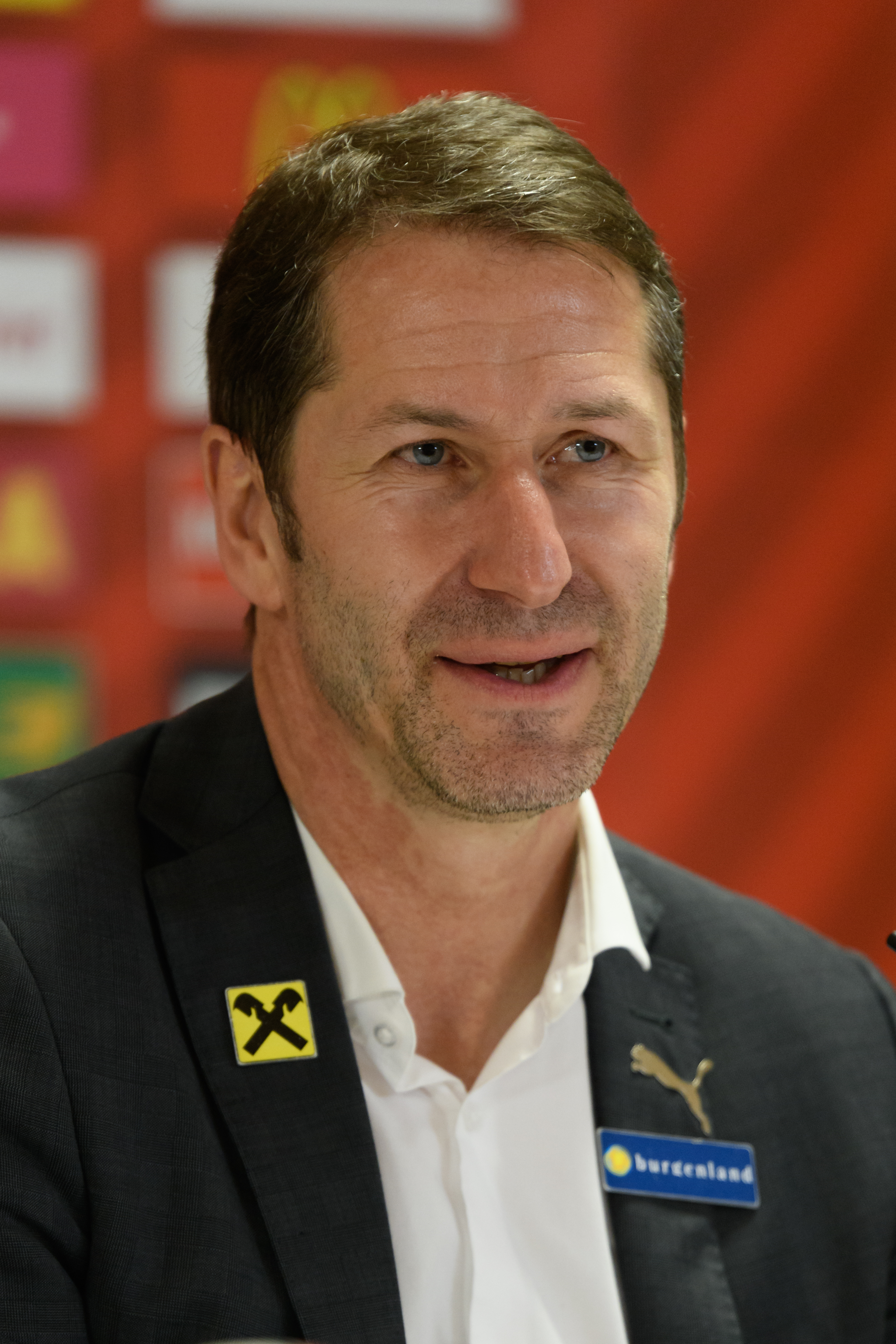
Franco Foda, the current head coach of Kosovo national football team.

=== Current coaching staff ===
Position	Name
Head coach	(Germany) Franco Foda
Assistant coach(es)	(Austria) Robert Ibertsberger
Assistant coach(es)	(Germany) Thomas Kristl
Assistant coach(es)	(Kosovo) Atdhe Nuhiu
Goalkeeping coach	(Kosovo) Ahmet Beselica
Match analyst	(Germany) Maximilian Matten
Video analyst	(Austria) Robin Krasniqi
Team manager	(Kosovo) Bajram Shala
Sporting director	(Kosovo) Samir Ujkani
Director of sport	(Kosovo) Muharrem Sahiti

=== Manager history ===
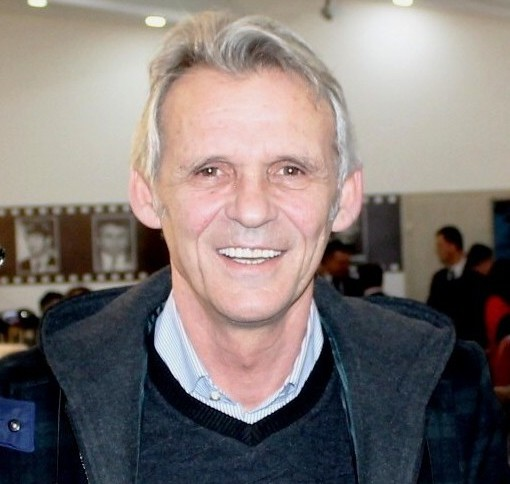
Muharrem Sahiti has been the manager of the national team in three separate stints.

As of 17 November 2026

No.	Name	Period	Record				
No.	Name	Period	G	W	D	L	Win %
1	(Republic of Kosova) Ajet Shosholli	1993–2002	1	0	0	1	0.00
2	(Kosovo) Bylbyl Sokoli	2002–2005	1	0	0	1	0.00
3	(Kosovo) Muharrem Sahiti	2005–2006	3	2	0	1	66.67
4	(Kosovo) Edmond Rugova	2006–2009	1	1	0	0	100.00
5	(Kosovo) Albert Bunjaki	2009–2017	18	3	3	12	16.67
C	(Kosovo) Muharrem Sahiti	2017–2018	1	1	0	0	100.00
6 C	(Switzerland) Bernard Challandes → (Kosovo) Muharrem Sahiti (Note: On 11 November 2020, Bernard Challandes tested positive with COVID-19 and Muharrem Sahiti was named as his replacement for the November 2020 matches, against Albania (2–1 away defeat), Slovenia (2–1 away defeat), and Moldova (1–0 home win).)	2018–2021 2020	40	17	8	15	42.50
C	(Slovenia) Primož Gliha	2021–2022	2	0	1	1	0.00
7	(France) Alain Giresse	2022–2023	14	4	6	4	28.57
8	(Slovenia) Primož Gliha	2023	6	2	2	2	33.33
9	(Germany) Franco Foda	2024–present	29	15	5	9	51.72
Total			116	45	25	46	38.79

== Players ==
=== Current squad ===
- The following players were called up for the 2026–27 UEFA Nations League matches against Israel and the Republic of Ireland, on 14 and 17 November 2026.
- Caps and goals are correct as of 17 November 2026, after the match against the Republic of Ireland.

No.	Pos.	Player	Date of birth (age)	Caps	Goals	Club
1	GK	Arijanet Muric	7 November 1998 (age 28)	54	0	(Italian Football Federation) Sassuolo
12	GK	Visar Bekaj	24 May 1997 (age 29)	11	0	(Albanian Football Federation) Tirana
16	GK	Amir Saipi	8 July 2000 (age 26)	8	0	(Royal Spanish Football Federation) Castellón
2	DF	Lindrit Kamberi	7 October 1999 (age 27)	2	0	(Swiss Football Association) Zürich
3	DF	Kreshnik Hajrizi	28 May 1999 (age 27)	9	1	(Swiss Football Association) Sion
4	DF	Ilir Krasniqi	2 April 2000 (age 26)	25	0	(Ukrainian Association of Football) Polissya Zhytomyr
5	DF	Ron Raçi	18 September 2002 (age 24)	6	0	(Croatian Football Federation) Hajduk Split
13	DF	Dion Gallapeni	22 December 2004 (age 21)	19	0	(Polish Football Association) Wisła Płock
15	DF	Mërgim Vojvoda (vice-captain)	1 February 1995 (age 31)	81	3	(Italian Football Federation) Udinese
17	DF	Bleon Kurtulus	24 June 2007 (age 19)	1	0	(Swedish Football Association) Malmö
6	MF	Elvis Rexhbeçaj	1 November 1997 (age 29)	19	2	(German Football Association) VfL Wolfsburg
8	MF	Betim Fazliji	25 April 1999 (age 27)	23	0	(Swiss Football Association) St. Gallen
19	MF	Dion Kacuri	11 February 2004 (age 22)	3	0	(Austrian Football Association) Austria Lustenau
21	MF	Lindon Emërllahu	7 December 2002 (age 23)	16	2	(Ukrainian Association of Football) Polissya Zhytomyr
22	MF	Milot Avdyli	28 July 2002 (age 24)	2	0	(Football Association of Slovenia) Celje
23	MF	Leon Avdullahu	23 February 2004 (age 22)	13	0	(German Football Association) TSG Hoffenheim
7	FW	Milot Rashica (3rd captain)	28 June 1996 (age 30)	68	12	(Turkish Football Federation) Beşiktaş
9	FW	Albion Rrahmani	31 August 2000 (age 26)	27	7	(Italian Football Federation) Venezia
11	FW	Fisnik Asllani	8 August 2002 (age 24)	22	5	(German Football Association) TSG Hoffenheim
14	FW	Baton Zabërgja	18 April 2001 (age 25)	11	0	(Ukrainian Association of Football) Kharkiv
18	FW	Vedat Muriqi (captain)	24 April 1994 (age 32)	73	33	(Turkish Football Federation) Fenerbahçe

=== Recent call-ups ===
The following players have also been called up for the team within the last twelve months and are still available and eligible for selection.

Pos.	Player	Date of birth (age)	Caps	Goals	Club	Latest call-up
GK	Faton Maloku	11 June 1991 (age 35)	0	0	(Kosovo) Drita	v. Republic of Ireland, 24 September 2026^{PRE}
GK	Altin Gjokaj	11 November 2005 (age 21)	0	0	(Kosovo) Prishtina	v. Andorra, 7 June 2026^{U21}
DF	Lumbardh Dellova	1 January 1999 (age 27)	27	3	(Turkey) Amedspor	v. Israel, 14 November 2026^{INJ}
DF	Leard Sadriu	22 April 2001 (age 25)	2	0	(Romania) Argeș Pitești	v. Austria, 4 October 2026
DF	Albian Hajdari	18 May 2003 (age 23)	8	0	(Germany) TSG Hoffenheim	v. Austria, 27 September 2026^{INJ}
DF	Andi Hoti	2 March 2003 (age 23)	1	0	(Germany) Eintracht Braunschweig	v. Republic of Ireland, 24 September 2026^{PRE}
MF	Edon Zhegrova	31 March 1999 (age 27)	51	6	(Italy) Juventus	v. Republic of Ireland, 17 November 2026^{INJ}
MF	Veldin Hoxha	15 October 2002 (age 24)	13	1	(Russia) Rubin Kazan	v. Republic of Ireland, 17 November 2026^{SUS}
MF	Valmir Matoshi	4 July 2003 (age 23)	4	1	(Switzerland) Thun	v. Israel, 14 November 2026^{INJ}
MF	Erblin Osmani	19 May 2009 (age 17)	1	0	(Germany) Bayern Munich	v. Israel, 14 November 2026^{INJ}
MF	Muharrem Jashari	21 February 1998 (age 28)	15	1	(Ukraine) LNZ Cherkasy	v. Austria, 4 October 2026^{PRE}
MF	Meriton Korenica	15 December 1996 (age 29)	7	0	(Romania) FCSB	v. Austria, 4 October 2026
MF	Vesel Demaku	5 February 2000 (age 26)	6	0	(Austria) SCR Altach	v. Austria, 4 October 2026
MF	Donat Rrudhani	2 May 1999 (age 27)	19	2	(Switzerland) Sion	v. Republic of Ireland, 24 September 2026^{INJ}
MF	Florian Haxha	6 April 2002 (age 24)	2	0	(Poland) Motor Lublin	v. Republic of Ireland, 24 September 2026^{PRE}
MF	Bledian Krasniqi	17 June 2001 (age 25)	1	0	(Switzerland) Zürich	v. Republic of Ireland, 24 September 2026^{PRE}
MF	Kreshnik Krasniqi	22 December 2000 (age 25)	0	0	(Norway) Strømsgodset	v. Republic of Ireland, 24 September 2026^{PRE}
MF	Leon Frokaj	23 April 2005 (age 21)	0	0	(Switzerland) St. Gallen	v. Republic of Ireland, 24 September 2026^{PRE}
MF	Faton Ademi	19 May 2006 (age 20)	0	0	(Germany) Greuther Fürth	v. Republic of Ireland, 24 September 2026^{U21}
MF	Dardan Shabanhaxhaj	23 April 2001 (age 25)	1	0	(Russia) Rubin Kazan	v. Andorra, 7 June 2026^{INJ}
MF	Bersant Celina	9 September 1996 (age 30)	38	2	(Saudi Arabia) Al-Ettifaq	v. Czech Republic, 31 May 2026^{CLUB}
MF	Ismet Lushaku	22 September 2000 (age 26)	2	0	(Sweden) Västerås SK	v. Czech Republic, 31 May 2026^{PRE}
MF	Florent Muslija	6 July 1998 (age 28)	40	3	(Germany) SC Freiburg	v. Turkey, 31 March 2026^{INJ}
FW	Ermal Krasniqi	7 September 1998 (age 28)	19	2	(Turkey) Amedspor	v. Israel, 14 November 2026^{INJ}
FW	Enis Rexhepi	12 March 2008 (age 18)	0	0	(Germany) VfB Stuttgart II	v. Israel, 14 November 2026^{DOC}
FW	Rilind Nivokazi	26 January 2000 (age 26)	1	0	(Switzerland) Sion	v. Republic of Ireland, 24 September 2026^{PRE}
Notes: ^{PRE} = Preliminary squad/standby.; ^{U21} = Was called up from national U21 squad.; ^{INJ} = Not part of the current squad due to injury.; ^{SUS} = Not available in next match due to red card suspension.; ^{CLUB} = Not part of the current squad after the club has not allowed him to join.; ^{DOC} = Not part of the current squad due to problems with his documentation.

== Records ==
Players in bold are still active with Kosovo.

=== Most appearances ===
As of 17 November 2026

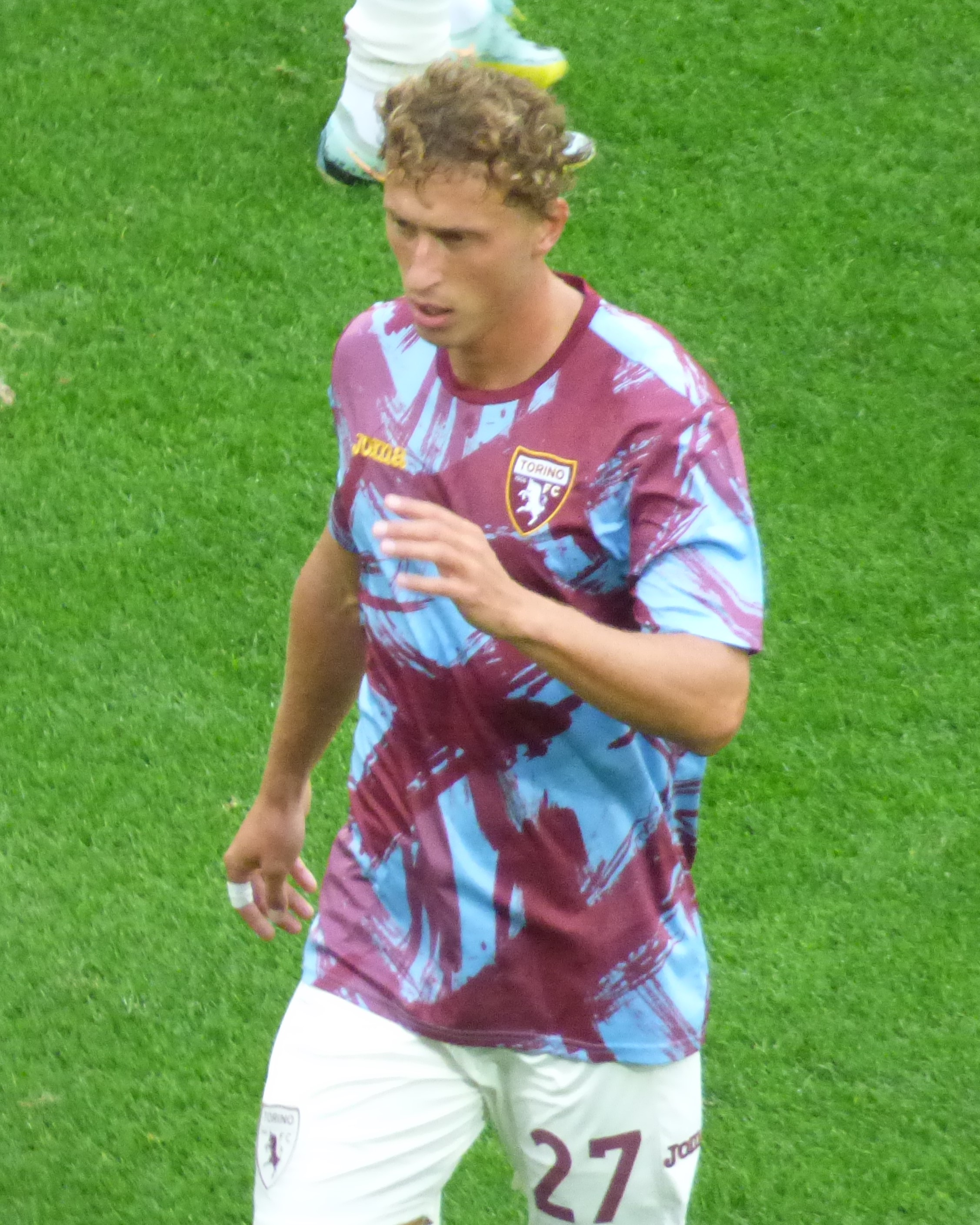
Mërgim Vojvoda is the most capped player in the history of Kosovo with 81 appearances.

Rank	Player	Caps	Goals	Pos.	Career
1	**Mërgim Vojvoda**	81	3	DF	2017–present
2	**Vedat Muriqi**	73	33	FW	2016–present
3	**Milot Rashica**	68	12	FW	2016–present
3	Amir Rrahmani	67	7	DF	2014–2026
5	Fidan Aliti	64	1	DF	2017–2026
6	**Arijanet Muric**	54	0	GK	2018–present
7	Valon Berisha	52	4	MF	2016–2026
8	**Edon Zhegrova**	51	6	MF	2018–present
9	Florent Hadergjonaj	39	1	DF	2019–2026
10	**Bersant Celina**	38	2	MF	2014–present

=== Top goalscorers ===
As of 17 November 2026

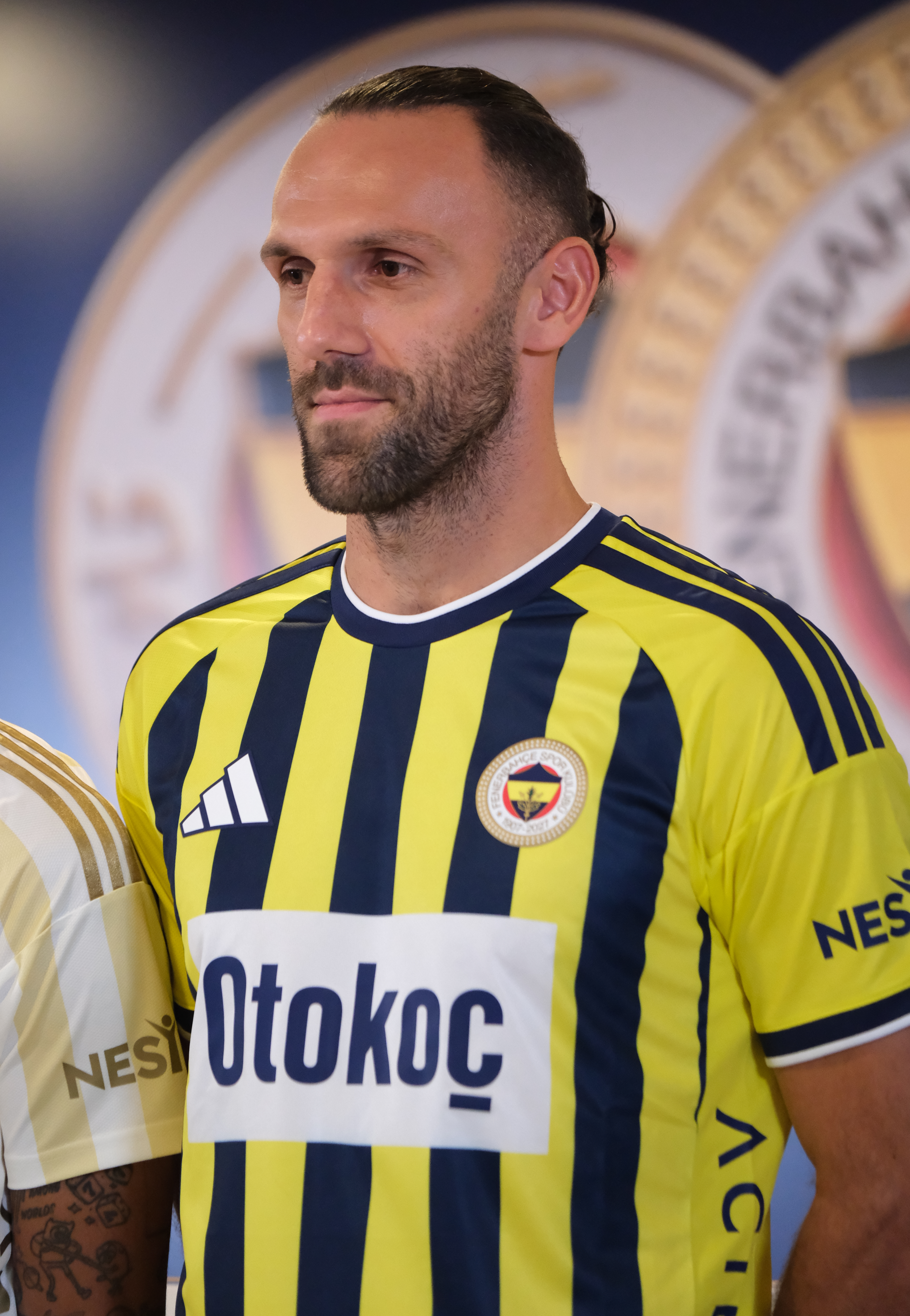
Vedat Muriqi is the top scorer in the history of Kosovo with 33 goals.

Rank	Player	Goals	Caps	Ratio	Career
1	**Vedat Muriqi**	33	73	0.45	2016–present
2	**Milot Rashica**	12	68	0.18	2016–present
3	**Arbër Zeneli**	9	33	0.27	2016–present
4	**Albion Rrahmani**	7	27	0.26	2023–present
4	Amir Rrahmani	7	67	0.1	2014–2026
6	**Edon Zhegrova**	6	51	0.12	2018–present
7	**Fisnik Asllani**	5	22	0.23	2024–present
7	Elbasan Rashani	5	29	0.17	2016–2024
9	Benjamin Kololli	4	24	0.17	2016–2022
9	Valon Berisha	4	52	0.08	2016–2026

=== Captains ===
As of 17 November 2026

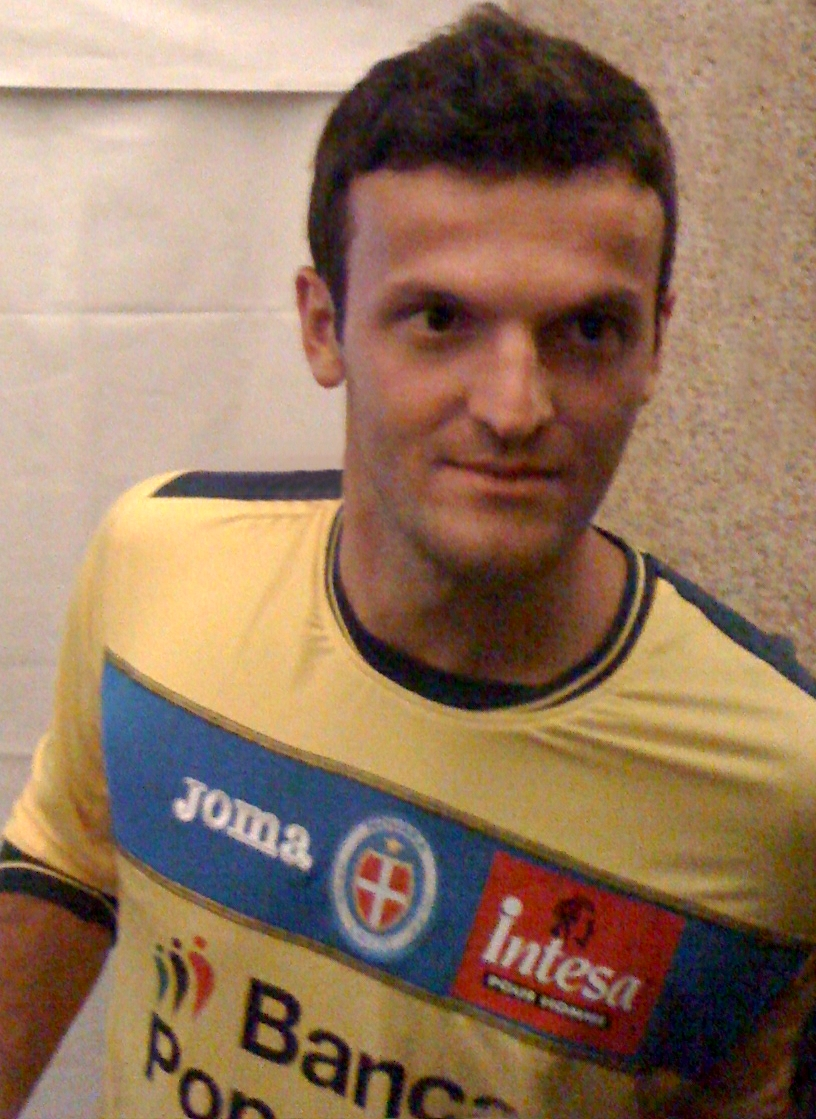
Samir Ujkani is the second-most capped player as captain in the history of Kosovo, with 30 appearances.

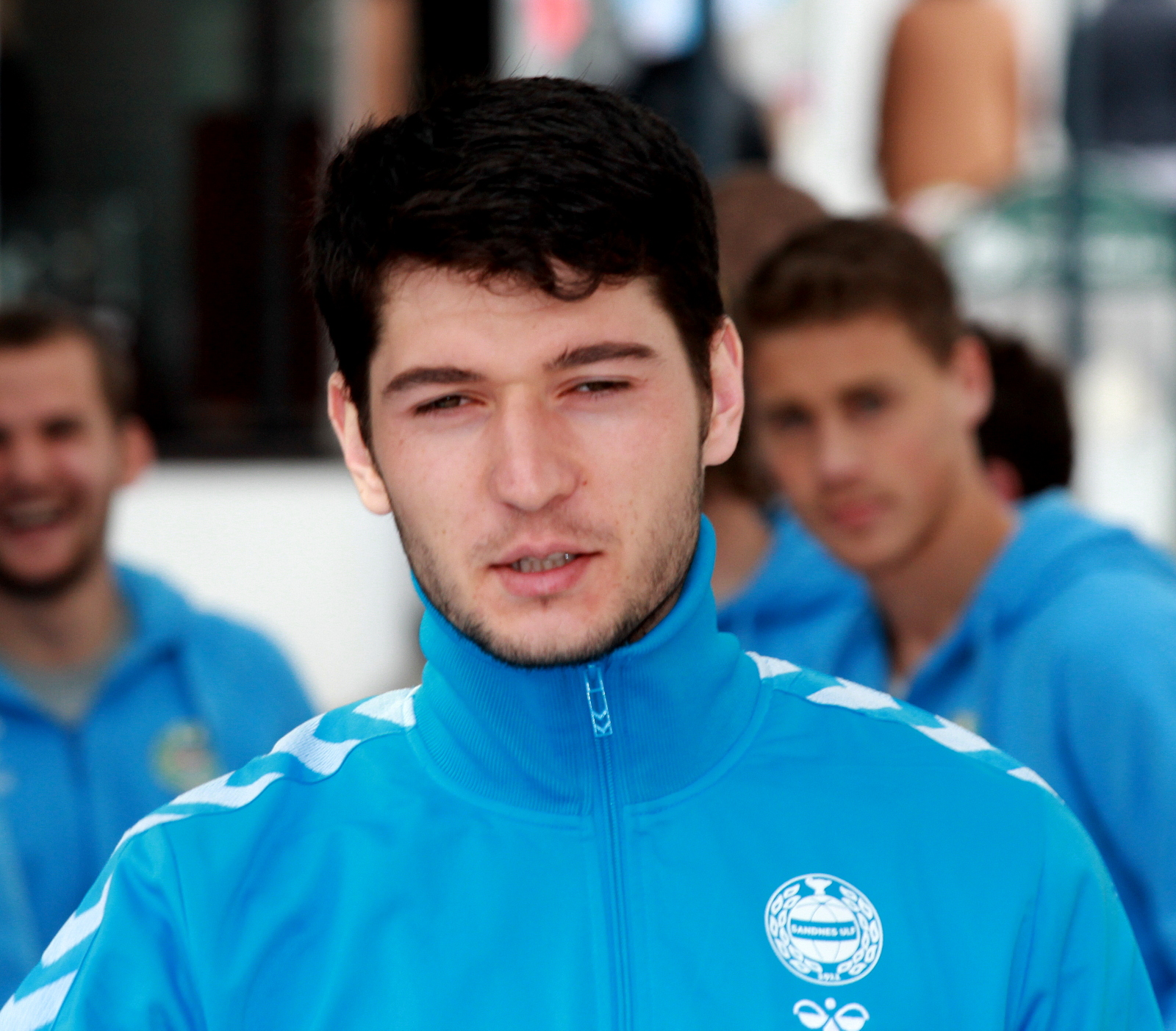
Anel Rashkaj is the first captain who led Kosovo in the first international match against Haiti.

Rank	Pos.	Player	As captain		Total	
Rank	Pos.	Player	Career	Caps	Career	Caps
1	DF	Amir Rrahmani	2019–2026	42	2014–2026	67
2	GK	Samir Ujkani	2015–2022	30	2014–2022	36
3	FW	**Vedat Muriqi**	2022–present	14	2016–present	73
4	DF	**Mërgim Vojvoda**	2025–present	5	2017–present	81
5	MF	Valon Berisha	2018–2020	3	2016–2026	52
5	DF	Fidan Aliti	2020–2023	3	2017–2026	64
5	MF	Anel Rashkaj	2014	3	2014–2020	14
7	MF	Herolind Shala	2019–2020	2	2016–2021	27
7	GK	**Visar Bekaj**	2021–2022	2	2015–present	11
10	MF	**Milot Rashica**	2023	1	2016–present	68
10	MF	Hekuran Kryeziu	2019	1	2015–2023	30
10	MF	Florian Loshaj	2021	1	2020–2024	24
10	DF	Lirim Kastrati	2022	1	2017–2023	15
10	MF	Enis Alushi	2014	1	2014–2017	10
10	MF	Besnik Hasi	2007	1	2007	1
10	MF	Genc Hoxha	1993	1	1993	1

== Competitive record ==
=== FIFA World Cup ===
On 9 June 2016, the UEFA Emergency Panel decided that Kosovo would join Croatia, Finland, Iceland, Turkey and Ukraine in Group I, and also decided that Bosnia and Herzegovina and Serbia should not play against Kosovo for security reasons. On 5 September 2016, Kosovo made its debut in FIFA World Cup qualification with a 1–1 away draw against Finland, with Kosovo's equalizing goal being scored by newcomer Valon Berisha from a penalty kick in the 60th minute. On 2 September 2021, Kosovo achieved their first win in the FIFA World Cup qualifications a 1–0 away win against Georgia.

FIFA World Cup record										Qualification record						
Year	Round	Pos	Pld	W	D	L	GF	GA	Squad	Pos.	Pld	W	D	L	GF	GA
(Uruguay) 1930 to (France) 1938	Part of Kingdom of Yugoslavia									Part of Kingdom of Yugoslavia						
(Brazil) 1950 to (Italy) 1990	Part of SFR Yugoslavia									Part of SFR Yugoslavia						
(United States) 1994 to (France) 1998	Part of FR Yugoslavia									Part of FR Yugoslavia						
(South Korea) (Japan) 2002 to (Germany) 2006	Not a FIFA member, under UNMIK									Not a FIFA member, under UNMIK						
(South Africa) 2010	Not a FIFA member									Not a FIFA member						
(Brazil) 2014	Not a FIFA member									Not a FIFA member						
(Russia) 2018	Did not qualify									6th	10	0	1	9	3	24
(Qatar) 2022	Did not qualify									5th	8	1	2	5	5	15
(Canada) (Mexico) (United States) 2026	Did not qualify									2nd (PO)	8	4	2	2	10	9
(Morocco) (Portugal) (Spain) 2030 (Note: Additional matches are scheduled to be played in Argentina, Paraguay, and Uruguay in commemoration of the 100th anniversary of the first world cup, however they are not considered to be official hosts of the tournament.)	To be determined															
(Saudi Arabia) 2034	To be determined															
Total	—	0/2	0	0	0	0	0	0	—	3/3	26	5	5	16	18	48

=== UEFA European Championship ===
On 2 December 2018, in Dublin, it was decided that Kosovo should be part in Group A of the UEFA Euro 2020 qualifying, together with Bulgaria, Czech Republic, Montenegro and 2018 World Cup fourth place finisher England. On 25 March 2019, Kosovo made their debut on UEFA European Championship qualifying with a 1–1 home draw against Bulgaria and the draw goal was scored by Arbër Zeneli on the 61st minute. On 11 June 2019, Kosovo won their first qualifying match for a major tournament by defeating Bulgaria 3–2.

UEFA European Championship record										Qualification record						
Year	Round	Pos	Pld	W	D	L	GF	GA	Squad	Pos	Pld	W	D	L	GF	GA
(France) 1960 to (Sweden) 1992	Part of SFR Yugoslavia									Part of SFR Yugoslavia						
(England) 1996	Part of FR Yugoslavia									Part of FR Yugoslavia						
(Belgium) (Netherlands) 2000 to (Portugal) 2004	Not a UEFA member, under UNMIK									Not a UEFA member, under UNMIK						
(Austria) (Switzerland) 2008	Not a UEFA member									Not a UEFA member						
(Poland) (Ukraine) 2012	Not a UEFA member									Not a UEFA member						
(France) 2016	Not a UEFA member									Not a UEFA member						
(Europe) 2020	Did not qualify									3rd (PO)	9	3	2	4	14	18
(Germany) 2024	Did not qualify									5th	10	2	5	3	10	10
(England) (Scotland) (Republic of Ireland) (Wales) 2028	To be determined									To be determined						
(Italy) (Turkey) 2032	To be determined									To be determined						
Total	—	0/2	0	0	0	0	0	0	—	2/2	19	5	7	7	24	28

=== UEFA Nations League ===
Kosovo's Nations League record
First match	Azerbaijan 0–0 Kosovo (Baku, Azerbaijan; 7 September 2018)
Biggest win	Malta 0–5 Kosovo (Ta' Qali, Malta; 17 November 2018)
Biggest defeat	Kosovo 0–3 Romania (Pristina, Kosovo; 6 September 2024)
Best result	27th place in 2026–27
Worst result	44th place in 2020–21

On 24 January 2018, in Lausanne, it was decided that Kosovo should be part of League D in Group 3 of the 2018–19 UEFA Nations League, together with Azerbaijan, Faroe Islands and Malta. On 7 September 2018, Kosovo made their debut in the UEFA Nations League with a 0–0 away draw against Azerbaijan. On 10 September 2018, Kosovo achieved their first win in the UEFA Nations League, which was also the team's first-ever competitive win, a 2–0 home win against the Faroe Islands. Kosovo finished the league unbeaten (with four wins and two draws) and was promoted to the next tier (C league) for the next edition.

UEFA Nations League record
League phase												Finals								
Season	LG	Grp	Pos.	Pld	W	D	L	GF	GA	P/R	RK	Year	Pos.	Pld	W	D	L	GF	GA	Squad
2018–19	D	3	1st	6	4	2	0	15	2	▲	42nd	(Portugal) 2019	Did not qualify							
2020–21	C	3	3rd	6	1	2	3	4	6	Same position	44th	(Italy) 2021	Did not qualify							
2022–23	C	2	2nd	6	3	0	3	11	8	Same position	39th	(Netherlands) 2023	Did not qualify							
2024–25	C	2	2nd	8	6	0	2	15	9	▲	38th	(Germany) 2025	Did not qualify							
2026–27	B	3	3rd	6	1	3	2	3	7	Same position	27th	2027	Did not qualify							
Total				32	15	7	10	48	32	27th		Total		0	0	0	0	0	0	—

=== Non-FIFA Tournament ===
Kosovo for first time after the Kosovo War participated in a tournament held to celebrate the 50th anniversary of the Cyprus Turkish Football Association. Kosovo lost against the host with result 1–0 and won against Sàpmi with result 4–1.

Year	Round	Pos.	Pld	W	D	L	GF	GA	Squad
(Northern Cyprus) KTFF 50th Anniversary Cup	Runners-up	2nd	2	1	0	1	4	2	Squad
Total	Runners-up	1/1	2	1	0	1	4	2	—

== FIFA ranking history ==
As of 4 October 2026

Best ranking Worst ranking Best mover Worst mover

Rank	Year	Pld	W	D	L	Win %	Ranking		Move	
Rank	Year	Pld	W	D	L	Win %	Best (+)	Worst (−)	Best	Worst
76	2026	8	3	2	3	37.50	76	78	1 (January)	—
80	2025	10	7	2	1	70.00	80	97	19 (November)	2 (July)
99	2024	9	5	0	4	55.56	99	106	3 (October)	3 (June)
101	2023	10	2	5	3	20.00	101	111	6 (October)	2 (September)
107	2022	10	4	3	3	40.00	106	109	2 (February)	1 (October)
111	2021	14	5	2	7	35.71	109	120	6 (September)	4 (October)
117	2020	9	1	2	6	11.11	115	117	0 (February)	1 (October)
115	2019	10	4	3	3	40.00	114	130	6 (June)	1 (November)
131	2018	9	7	2	0	77.78	131	178	24 (August)	1 (January)
177	2017	7	1	0	6	14.29	164	184	9 (November)	6 (April)
165	2016	5	1	1	3	20.00	164	190	22 (September)	190 (July)

== Head-to-head record ==
As of 17 November 2026 after the match against Republic of Ireland.

Opponent	Pld	W	D	L	GF	GA	GD	Win %	Reference
1993–present
Albania	6	1	1	4	9	11	−2	16.67	H2H results
Andorra	3	2	1	0	7	1	+6	66.67	H2H results
Armenia	3	2	1	0	8	4	+4	66.67	H2H results
Austria	2	0	1	1	2	4	−2	0.00	H2H results
Azerbaijan	2	1	1	0	4	0	+4	50.00	H2H results
Belarus	2	0	0	2	1	3	−2	0.00	H2H results
Bulgaria	2	1	1	0	4	3	+1	50.00	H2H results
Burkina Faso	2	2	0	0	7	0	+7	100.00	H2H results
Comoros	1	1	0	0	4	2	+2	100.00	H2H results
Croatia	2	0	0	2	0	7	−7	0.00	H2H results
Cyprus	4	4	0	0	14	1	+13	100.00	H2H results
Czech Republic	3	1	0	2	4	5	−1	33.33	H2H results
Denmark	1	0	1	0	2	2	+0	0.00	H2H results
England	2	0	0	2	3	9	−6	0.00	H2H results
Equatorial Guinea	1	1	0	0	2	0	+2	100.00	H2H results
Faroe Islands	4	2	2	0	5	1	+4	50.00	H2H results
Finland	2	0	1	1	1	2	−1	0.00	H2H results
Gambia	1	1	0	0	1	0	+1	100.00	H2H results
Georgia	2	1	0	1	2	2	+0	50.00	H2H results
Gibraltar	1	1	0	0	1	0	+1	100.00	H2H results
Greece	6	0	3	3	3	7	−4	0.00	H2H results
Guinea	1	0	0	1	1	2	−1	0.00	H2H results
Haiti	1	0	1	0	0	0	+0	0.00	H2H results
Hungary	1	0	0	1	0	2	−2	0.00	H2H results
Iceland	4	2	0	2	6	6	+0	50.00	H2H results
Israel	4	1	3	0	2	1	+1	25.00	H2H results
Jordan	1	0	0	1	0	2	−2	0.00	H2H results
Latvia	1	1	0	0	4	3	+1	100.00	H2H results
Lithuania	3	3	0	0	7	1	+6	100.00	H2H results
Madagascar	1	1	0	0	1	0	+1	100.00	H2H results
Malta	3	3	0	0	10	2	+8	100.00	H2H results
Moldova	2	1	1	0	2	1	+1	50.00	H2H results
Monaco	1	1	0	0	7	1	+6	100.00	H2H results
Montenegro	2	1	1	0	3	1	+2	50.00	H2H results
North Macedonia	1	0	0	1	1	2	−1	0.00	H2H results
Northern Cyprus	1	0	0	1	0	1	−1	0.00	H2H results
Northern Ireland	2	1	0	1	4	4	+0	50.00	H2H results
Norway	1	0	0	1	0	3	−3	0.00	H2H results
Oman	1	1	0	0	1	0	+1	100.00	H2H results
Republic of Ireland	2	1	0	1	1	3	−2	50.00	H2H results
Romania	4	0	1	3	0	8	−8	0.00	H2H results
San Marino	1	1	0	0	4	1	+3	100.00	H2H results
Sápmi	1	1	0	0	4	1	+3	100.00	
Saudi Arabia	1	1	0	0	1	0	+1	100.00	H2H results
Senegal	1	0	0	1	1	3	−2	0.00	H2H results
Slovakia	1	1	0	0	4	3	+1	100.00	H2H results
Slovenia	4	1	1	2	3	3	+0	25.00	H2H results
Spain	2	0	0	2	1	5	−4	0.00	H2H results
Sweden	5	2	0	3	3	7	−4	40.00	H2H results
Switzerland	5	0	4	1	5	9	−4	0.00	H2H results
Turkey	4	0	0	4	2	13	−11	0.00	H2H results H2H results*
Ukraine	2	0	0	2	0	5	−5	0.00	H2H results
50 countries	114	45	26	43	163	150	+13	39.47	All H2H results

== Honours ==
Awards

- Unofficial Football World Championships: 8 September 2025 – 31 March 2026 (6 months, 3 weeks and 2 days)

Decoration

- Kosovo: Presidential Medal of Merits (2026)

== See also ==
Men's

- Under-21
- Under-19
- Under-17
- Under-15
- Futsal

Women's

- National team
- Under-19
- Under-17
