= Tom Høgli =

Norwegian footballer (born 1984)

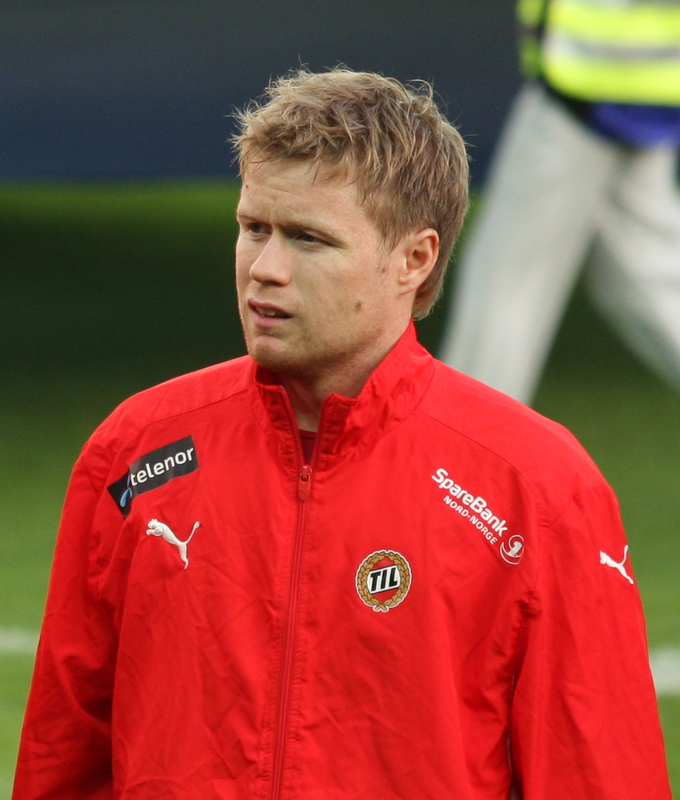
- Høgli with Tromsø in 2008

Personal information
- Full name: Tom Høgli
- Date of birth: 24 February 1984 (age 42)
- Place of birth: Harstad, Norway
- Height: 5 ft 9 in (1.75 m)
- Position: Right-back

Youth career
- Skånland

Senior career*
Years	Team	Apps	(Gls)
2002–2006	Bodø/Glimt	59	(3)
2007–2011	Tromsø	106	(1)
2011–2014	Club Brugge	75	(1)
2014–2017	Copenhagen	50	(1)
2018	Tromsø	13	(1)
Total		303	(7)

International career
2005–2006	Norway U21	10	(0)
2006	Sápmi	3	(6)
2008–2015	Norway	49	(2)
- * Club domestic league appearances and goals

Tom Høgli (born 24 February 1984) is a Saami-Norwegian former professional footballer who played as a defender.

== Club career ==
=== Bodø/Glimt ===
Høgli played several seasons for Bodø/Glimt, whom he joined from Skånland og Omegn IF, but was transferred to Tromsø ahead of the 2007 season.

=== Tromsø ===
Signed by Tromsø IL as a replacement for Patrice Bernier in central midfield, Høgli impressed in the right-back position.

He was named Tromsø player of the year for the season of 2008 by the supporters and earned the nickname "Super Tom", a nickname he got while playing in Bodø/Glimt.

On 29 May 2011, he scored his first goal for Tromsø in a 4–0 victory against Brann.

=== Club Brugge ===
On 18 June 2011, Høgli signed a contract with Belgian Pro League powerhouse Club Brugge.

=== F.C. Copenhagen ===
After three seasons with Club Brugge, Høgli agreed on 31 January 2014 to join the Danish club F.C. Copenhagen once his contract expires on 1 July 2014.

He made his debut in the Danish Superliga on 20 July 2014 in a match against Silkeborg IF

== International career ==
Høgli was capped for the Norwegian under-21 national team and was joint top scorer at the 2006 VIVA World Cup for Sápmi.

On 20 August 2008, Høgli made his debut for Norway in a friendly match against Ireland. He was picked by national coach Egil "Drillo" Olsen for the team versus Germany in autumn 2009.

Høgli received the Gold Watch after his 25th cap, in the friendly against England national football team on 26 May 2012, but he had to leave the pitch after 37-minute due to a tackle from Steven Gerrard. According to Norway's medic, Thor Einar Anderssen, this was a tackle that could have ended Høgli's career.

Høgli also competed for the Sápmi football team during the inaugural 2006 Viva World Cup, which they were the champions of.

=== International goals ===
Scores and results list Norway's goal tally first:

#	Date	Venue	Opponent	Score	Result	Competition
1.	11 October 2011	Ullevaal Stadion, Oslo, Norway	Cyprus	3–1	3–1	UEFA Euro 2012 qualifying
2.	7 June 2013	Qemal Stafa Stadium, Tirana, Albania	Albania	1–1	1–1	2014 World Cup qualifying

== Career statistics ==
As of 1 September 2018

Club	Season	Division	League		Cup		Europe		Total	
Club	Season	Division	Apps	Goals	Apps	Goals	Apps	Goals	Apps	Goals
Bodø/Glimt	2003	Tippeligaen	1	0	1	0	0	0	2	0
Bodø/Glimt	2004	Tippeligaen	13	0	4	0	1	0	18	0
Bodø/Glimt	2005	Tippeligaen	17	0	3	0	0	0	20	0
Bodø/Glimt	2006	Adeccoligaen	28	3	1	0	0	0	29	3
Bodø/Glimt	Total		59	3	9	0	1	0	69	3
Tromsø	2007	Tippeligaen	14	0	4	0	0	0	18	0
Tromsø	2008	Tippeligaen	24	0	2	0	0	0	26	0
Tromsø	2009	Tippeligaen	28	0	3	0	6	0	37	0
Tromsø	2010	Tippeligaen	30	0	4	0	0	0	34	0
Tromsø	2011	Tippeligaen	10	1	4	0	0	0	14	1
Tromsø	Total		106	1	17	0	6	0	129	1
Club Brugge	2011–12	Jupiler Pro League	31	0	0	0	5	0	36	0
Club Brugge	2012–13	Jupiler Pro League	24	0	2	0	4	0	30	0
Club Brugge	2013–14	Jupiler Pro League	17	1	1	0	0	0	18	1
Club Brugge	Total		72	1	3	0	9	0	84	1
Copenhagen	2014–15	Superliga	31	1	0	0	9	0	40	1
Copenhagen	2015–16	Superliga	8	0	0	0	0	0	8	0
Copenhagen	2016–17	Superliga	9	0	0	0	2	0	11	0
Copenhagen	2017–18	Superliga	2	0	0	0	1	0	3	0
Copenhagen	Total		50	1	0	0	12	0	62	1
Tromsø	2018	Eliteserien	11	0	1	0	0	0	12	0
Career Total			298	6	30	0	28	0	356	6

== Honours ==
Copenhagen

- Danish Superliga: 2015–16, 2016–17
- Danish Cup: 2014–15, 2015–16, 2016–17

Individual

- Kniksen Award Defender of the Year: 2010
