= Costebelle =

Hyères town quarter in France

Coordinates: 43°07′N 6°07′E

Costebelle is a quarter of the town of Hyères in the southeast of France, in the Var département.
