= Sápmi football team =

Unofficial national football team representing the Sámi people

Sápmi
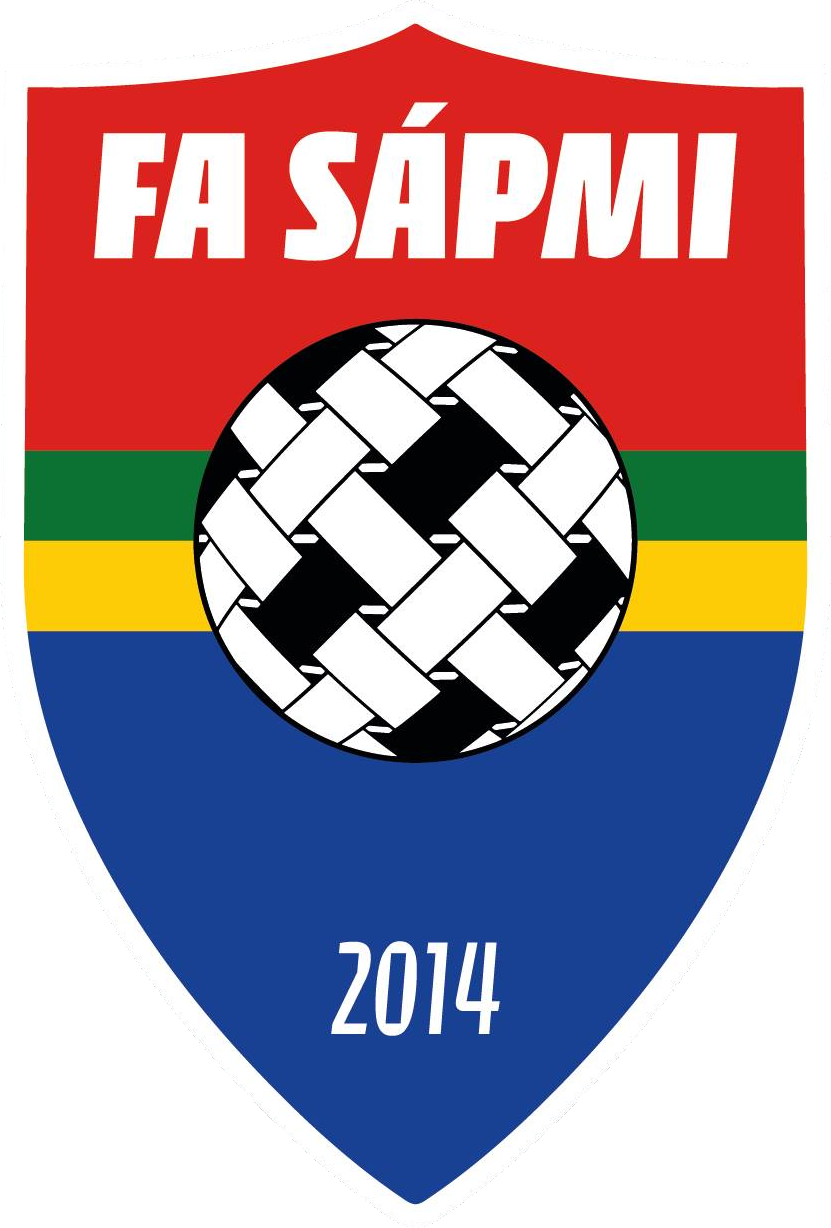
- Association: FA Sápmi
- Confederation: ConIFA
- Head coach: Jon Steinar Eriksen
- Most caps: Johansen (6); Lamøy (6); Minde (6); Sandvärn (6)
- Top scorer: Høgli (6); Johansen (6); Lamøy (6); Nystrøm (6)
First colours	Second colours

First international
- Åland 4–2 Sápmi (Mariehamn, Åland; July 1985)

Biggest win
- Sápmi 21–1 Monaco (Hyères, France; 24 November 2006)

Biggest defeat
- Sápmi 0–6 East Germany U23 (Gällivare; Sweden; July 1987)

VIVA World Cup
- Appearances: 3 (first in 2006)
- Best result: Champions (2006)

ConIFA World Football Cup
- Appearances: 2 (first in 2014)
- Best result: Quarter-finals (2016)

The Sápmi football team is a football team representing the Sámi people, who inhabit northern parts of Norway, Sweden, Finland and Russia. The team is not a member of UEFA or FIFA and therefore does not participate in their competitions, although it is a member of the ConIFA. The organizing body is FA Sápmi.

== Tournament history ==
Football in Lapland was organized in 1979 and 2001, controlled by the Norwegian Football Federation. The team's first match was organized in June 1985 facing the Åland football team. Football in the Lapland region of Finland is organized into localized regional tiers by the Football Association of Finland. In both 1979 and 2001, distinct fourth- and fifth-tier leagues were contested across the province (historically categorized under "Lappi" sections) featuring local clubs such as FC Santa Claus, KiU Kittilä, and Kontio Kolari.

Sápmi participated in the KTFF 50th Anniversary Cup in 2005 in Northern Cyprus, losing matches against Northern Cyprus and Kosovo and finishing third. In November 2006, Sápmi participated in and won the inaugural VIVA World Cup in Occitania, organised by the NF-Board. Sápmi overcame the host nation and Monaco to win the trophy, scoring 42 goals in 3 games. They hosted the next finals in 2008, defeating Kurdistan to finish third, before travelling to Padania in 2009, where they again finished third. Sápmi has not participated in a VIVA World Cup since, although in 2010, they bid for the hosting rights of the 2014 edition.

Sápmi hosted the 2014 ConIFA World Football Cup(which was the year that they joined), and it competed at the 2016 ConIFA World Football Cup.

=== 2014 ConIFA World Football Cup ===
In 2 June 2014, Lapland faced Abkhazia, the match ending in a 1-2 defeat. In June 3, Lapland faced Occitania and lost their second match 0-1. In 4 June, Lapland won their first match against Tamil Îlam 4-2. In 15 June, they faced Nagorno-Karabakh and lost 1-5. Lapland finished in tenth place.

== Notable players ==
Sápmi footballers who have played for the Norwegian national side and Sápmi teams include Morten Gamst Pedersen, Sigurd Rushfeldt and Tom Høgli. Steffen Nystrøm, of Tromsø IL, has played for the Norway under-21 team and made his Sápmi debut in the VIVA World Cup.

== Tournament records ==
=== World Cup record ===
Year	Position	GP	W	D	L	GS	GA
VIVA World Cup
(Occitania) 2006	Champion	3	3	0	0	41	1
(Sápmi) 2008	Third place	5	2	1	2	9	8
(Padania) 2009	Third place	4	1	1	2	12	12
(Gozo) 2010	did not enter						
(Kurdistan Region) 2012	did not enter						
ConIFA World Football Cup
(Sápmi) 2014	Group stage	4	1	0	3	6	10
(Abkhazia) 2016	Quarter-finals	5	3	0	2	10	4
(Barawa) 2018	did not qualify						
(Kurdistan Region) 2024	did not qualify						
Total	Best: Champions	21	10	2	9	78	35

== Selected internationals ==
Date	Venue		Opponent	Score
8 June 2019	2019 CONIFA European Football Cup – Artsakh	Sápmi	Székely Land	3–2
6 June 2019	2019 CONIFA European Football Cup – Artsakh	Sápmi	Padania	0−4
4 June 2019	2019 CONIFA European Football Cup – Artsakh	Sápmi	Chameria	0−4
3 June 2019	2019 CONIFA European Football Cup – Artsakh	Sápmi	Abkhazia	0−1
2 June 2019	2019 CONIFA European Football Cup – Artsakh	Sápmi	(Republic of Artsakh) Artsakh	2−3
30 March 2012	Toulouse, France	Sápmi	Occitania	2−3
26 June 2009	2009 VIVA World Cup – Padania	Sápmi	Provence	4–4 (5–4 p)
25 June 2009	2009 VIVA World Cup – Padania	Sápmi	Padania	0–4
24 June 2009	2009 VIVA World Cup – Padania	Sápmi	Gozo	7–2
23 June 2009	2009 VIVA World Cup – Padania	Sápmi	Provence	1–2
13 July 2008	2008 VIVA World Cup – Sápmi	Sápmi	Kurdistan Region	3–1
12 July 2008	2008 VIVA World Cup – Sápmi	Sápmi	Provence	4–2
11 July 2008	2008 VIVA World Cup – Sápmi	Sápmi	Padania	0–2
9 July 2008	2008 VIVA World Cup – Sápmi	Sápmi	Arameans Suryoye	0–1
7 July 2008	2008 VIVA World Cup – Sápmi	Sápmi	Kurdistan Region	2–2
24 November 2006	2006 VIVA World Cup – Occitania	Sápmi	Monaco	21–1
23 November 2006	2006 VIVA World Cup – Occitania	Sápmi	Monaco	14–0
20 November 2006	2006 VIVA World Cup – Occitania	Sápmi	Occitania	7–0
4 November 2005	KTFF 50th Anniversary Cup – Northern Cyprus	Sápmi	Northern Cyprus	2–6
3 November 2005	KTFF 50th Anniversary Cup – Northern Cyprus	Sápmi	Kosovo	1–4
28 July 2004	Tromsø, Sápmi	Sápmi	Northern Cyprus	1–1
4 July 2001	Odense, Denmark	Sápmi	Greenland	5–1
7 August 1998	Stockholm, Sweden	Sápmi	Estonia	0–0
7 July 1992	Tallinn, Estonia	Sápmi	Estonia	1–2
6 July 1991	Karasjok Municipality, Norway	Sápmi	Estonia	2–1
June, 1991	Karasjok, Sápmi	Sápmi	Estonia	2–1
October, 1990	Tallinn, Estonia	Sápmi	Estonia	0–2
June, 1987	Mariehamn, Åland	Sápmi	Åland	0–1
June, 1986	Kautokeino, Sápmi	Sápmi	Åland	2–0
June, 1985	Mariehamn, Åland	Sápmi	Åland	2–4

== Current squad ==
Sápmi squad at the 2016 ConIFA World Football Cup in Abkhazia, 28 May – 6 June 2016.

No.	Pos.	Player	Date of birth (age)	Caps	Goals	Club
1	GK	Alexander Ellingsen	2 July 1997 (age 29)			(Norwegian Football Federation) Alta
13	GK	Andreas Mortensen				(Norwegian Football Federation) Skjervøy FK
2	DF	Roy Arild Rasmussen				(Norwegian Football Federation) Kautokeino IL
3	DF	Mikkel Ole Eira				(Norwegian Football Federation) Kautokeino IL
4	DF	Jon Steinar Eriksen	13 February 1984 (age 42)			(Norwegian Football Federation) Bossekop UL
5	DF	Svenn Johansen				(Norwegian Football Federation) Tromsdalen UIL
6	DF	Raymond Johnsen				(Norwegian Football Federation) Grovfjord IL
12	DF	Hans Åge Yndestad	24 July 1980 (age 46)			(Norwegian Football Federation) Ulfstind IL
9	MF	Lars Iver Strand	7 May 1983 (age 43)			
10	MF	Pär-Jon Huuva				
11	MF	Per-Anders Pokka				
14	MF	John Eriksson				(Swedish Football Association) IFK Östersund
15	MF	Jirijoonas Kanth	16 June 1987 (age 39)			(Football Association of Finland) Someron Voima
16	MF	Simen Kjær				(Norwegian Football Federation) SK Hardhaus
17	MF	Ante Smuk	20 September 1988 (age 37)			(Norwegian Football Federation) IL Norild
18	MF	Mads Petter Utsi				(Norwegian Football Federation) Porsanger IL
19	MF	Frank Ole Vars				(Norwegian Football Federation) Kautokeino IL
20	MF	Per Isak Vars				(Norwegian Football Federation) Kautokeino IL
7	FW	Øyvind Garfjell				(Norwegian Football Federation) Lyngen/Karnes IL
8	FW	Morten Moldskred	13 June 1980 (age 46)			(Norwegian Football Federation) Finnsnes IL

== Honours ==
=== Non-FIFA competitions ===
- Viva World Cup
  - Champions (1): 2006
  - Third place (2): 2008, 2009
