= CONIFA Women's World Football Cup =

- Founded: 2022; 4 years ago
- Region: International
- Current champions: Sápmi (2nd title)
- Most championships: Sápmi (2 titles)
- 2027 CONIFA Women's World Football Cup

The CONIFA Women's World Football Cup is an international football tournament organized by CONIFA, an umbrella association for states, minorities, stateless peoples and regions unaffiliated with FIFA, which has been held every two years since 2022.

== Hosting ==
CONIFA is an organisation that provides an outlet for countries, sub-national entities, stateless peoples and ethnic minorities to play international football. Because a number of their members represent diasporas or displaced peoples, it is not always possible for the host of the World Football Cup to be able to hold the competition in their own "territory". As a consequence of this, CONIFA defines the "host" of the World Football Cup as being the member association that heads the organising committee, whether or not the tournament is actually played in the geographical area that the host association represents.

== Editions ==
=== Tibet 2022 ===
The first edition of the CONIFA Women's World Cup was held in Tibet region of India in 2022. 4 teams were intitaly planned to participate. However, Matabeleland reported issues with visas to participate, but no reason was given for Székely Land's withdrawal. Leaving Sápmi and Tibet that actually participated.

The tournament was held in a two-legged format in early July. Sápmi won the competition and the first title.

=== Sápmi 2024 ===
The second edition was held in Bodø in Norway. The competition saw three teams participating in a double round-robin format. Tamil Eelam, Sápmi and Székely Land.

After initially being announced as participants, Kashmir and Northern Cyprus later withdrew from the competition with no official reason given. Tibet would also be removed from the tournament on the opening day after the team was unable to secure visa to travel aboard on time. These withdrawals would result in the tournament being reduced from the originally announced 6 participants to 3.

=== Khalistan 2027 ===
The third edition was to be held in Paris in France. The decision was included in the "CONIFA Asia & Oceania 2024 Report 2025 Activities 2025-2028 Plans" document released for the 2025 CONIFA AGM held in Genoa, Italy. Tamil Eelam, which competed in the 2024 edition in Bodø were to serve as local hosting committee. However, in August 2026, it was announced that the next edition of the tournament would be held in 2027, with games played Walsall, England and hosted by the Khalistan FA.

== Results ==
Ed.	Year	Host	First place game			Third place game			Num. teams
Ed.	Year	Host	(gold) Champion	Score	(silver) Runner-up	(bronze) Third	Score	Fourth	Num. teams
1	2022	Tibet (Note: Tibet association named as official host; matches were held in Paonta Cholsum, India.)	Sápmi	22–1 (Note: aggregate score of two legs)	Tibet	——	——	——	2
2	2024	Sápmi (Note: Sapmi association named as official host; matches were held in Bodø, Norway.)	Sápmi	2–1	Tamil Eelam	Székely Land	——	——	3
3	2027	Khalistan (Note: Khalistan association named as official host; matches to be held in Walsall, England.)							8

== Appearances ==
Legend

- 1st — Champions
- 2nd — Runners-up
- 3rd — Third Place
- — Hosts
- • — Did not participate

For each tournament, the number of teams in each finals tournament (in brackets) are shown.

Team	2022 (Tibet) (2)	2024 (Sápmi) (3)	Total participations
Sápmi	1st	1st	2/2
Tibet	2nd	•	1/2
Tamil Eelam	•	2nd	1/2
Székely Land	•	3rd	1/2

== See also ==
- Viva World Cup – Women's tournament
- CONIFA World Football Cup
- CONIFA
