= 2027 CONIFA Women's World Football Cup =

Tournament details
- Host country: Khalistan (official); England (location)
- City: Walsall
- Dates: 28 May - 5 June 2027
- Teams: 8
- Venue: 1

The 2027 CONIFA Women's World Football Cup is the third edition of the CONIFA Women's World Football Cup, an international football tournament for states, minorities, stateless peoples and regions unaffiliated with FIFA organised by CONIFA.

== Participants ==
The following teams were initially announced to participate in the tournament;

- Khalistan (hosts)
- Northern Cyprus
- Sápmi
- Székely Land
- Tamil Eelam
- Tibet
- São Paulo F.A.D.

== Host ==
The tournament will be played in Willenhall, a market town in the Metropolitan Borough of Walsall, in the county of West Midlands, England.

=== Venue ===
Guardian Warehousing Arena
Capacity: 5,000
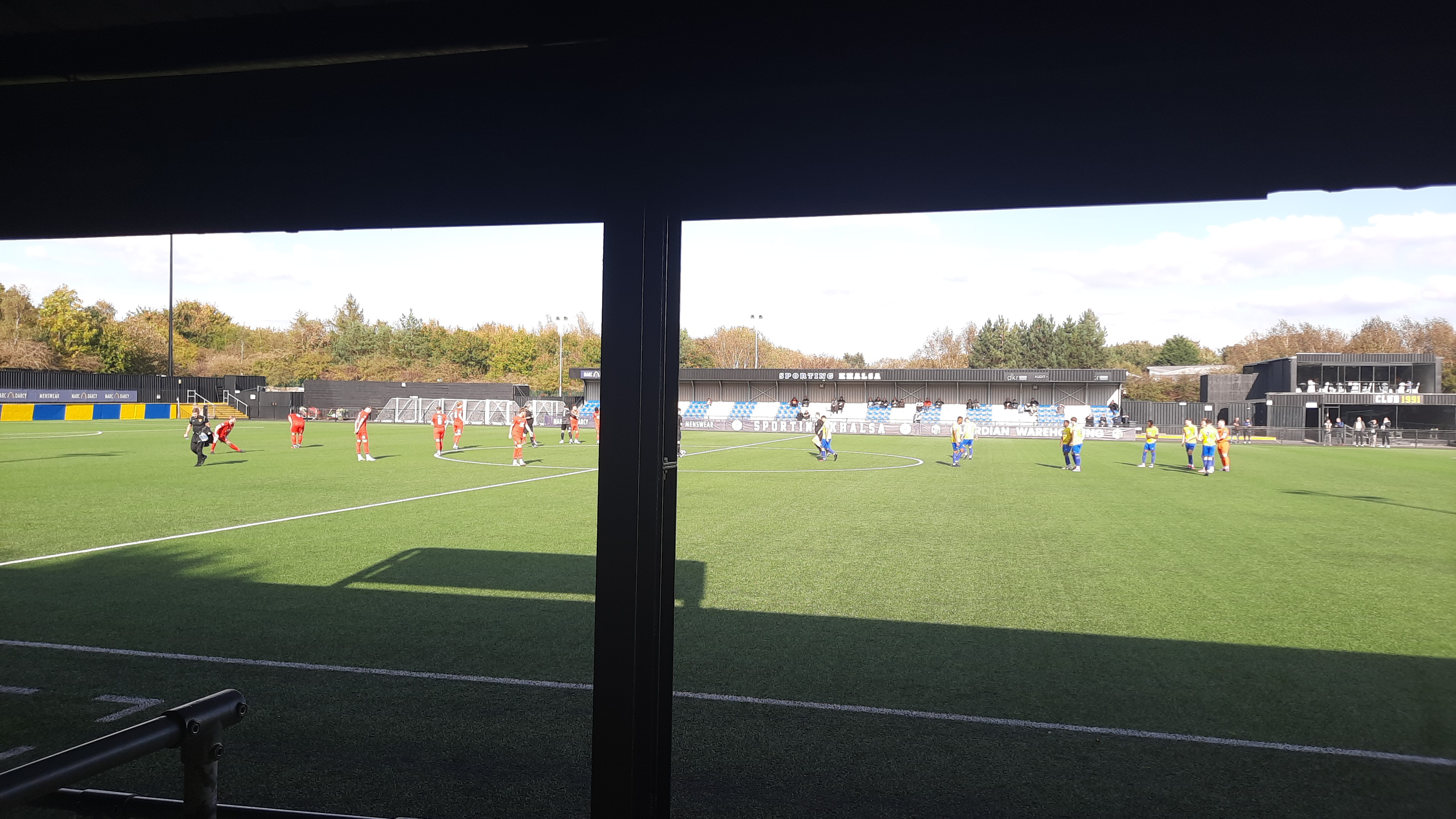
