= History of football in Tibet and the diaspora =

The history of Tibetan association football started when Tibetans for the first time watched British and Indian playing football at the British trade agency at Gyantse at the beginning of the 20th century. More football was played in Tibet since the British built a military training facility in Lhasa in 1913 and it got another impulse when a modern police force was introduced in the country in the 1920s. Throughout the 20th century football was being played in Tibet, also after the Annexation of Tibet by the People's Republic of China from the 1950s on.

In the 1950s several popular teams arose, like Lhasa, Potala, Drapchi, and the Bodyguard Regiment. Regularly matches were played among each other and against Chinese soldiers. Tibetan teams like the Kham football team played against other Chinese provincial teams.

== Cultural Revolution and later ==
Football culture was reduced to a minimum during the reign of Mao Zedong and the Cultural Revolution since 1966. The national stadium of Kham was then destroyed. Later the stadium of Kham was rebuilt and hosts since then the Tibetan Regional Selection of Kham, a semi-prof team that plays in the annual tournaments between the different regions of China.

Some of the players of the Kham team went into exile and joined the Tibet national football team as trainers.

== Exile ==
In the Tibetan diaspora since 1959 there remained still interest among students for playing football; between schools tournaments were organised. In 1981 it was the first time that football was played on a club level at the Gyalyum Chenmo Memorial (GCM) Gold Cup, in memorial of the mother of the Fourteenth Dalai Lama. This is at the beginning of the 21st century still the most popular football tournament for Tibetans in exile.

=== National team in exile ===
When Danish Michael Nybrandt in 1997 returned from a trip to Tibet, he got the idea to revive the national Tibetan national football team. He did so by founding the TNFA (Tibetan National Football Association). He succeeded to compose a selection of players that had no experience to speak of. He persuaded sports make Hummel to fund his initiative. Since then the Tibetan national team travels around the world to play football against local football clubs as well as national teams.

The first time the national team of the TNFA played football was in June 1999 in the Italian city Bologna, at the invitation of the national football rock band Dinamo Rock to the Tibetan Children's Villages. This meant a marking point in the history of Tibetan football. Since many talented players got the chance to make their dreams come true by playing for their own national team. The first match after the definite foundation of the TNFA was played in the stadium of the Danish team Vanløse IF in Copenhagen on June 30, 2001, against the Greenland national football team. Greenland, however, won this match with 4–1.

== Filmography ==
- The Cup, a film of Khyentse Norbu of 1999
- The Forbidden Team (Danish: Det forbudte landshold), a documentary of Rasmus Dinesen of 2003
