= West Papua football team =

National association football team

West Papua
- Nickname(s): Orange, black and blue Paradisaea (The birds of paradise)
- Association: Football Association West Papua
- Confederation: ConIFA; NF Board (formerly)
- Head coach: Garry llina
First colours	Second colours	Third colours

First international
- West Papua 1–1 South Moluccas (The Hague, Netherlands; 23 June 2005)

Biggest win
- West Papua 22–0 Katanga (The Hague, Netherlands; 23 October 2021)

Biggest defeat
- West Papua 2–10 Tamil Eelam (The Hague, Netherlands; 21 December 2019)
- Website: https://www.footballassociationwestpapua.org

The West Papua football team is a football team from the Indonesian half (Western New Guinea) of the New Guinea island. It is a member of ConIFA, having previously been a member of the NF-Board. On 23 June 2005, the West Papua national football team played in the UNPO Cup in The Hague. They played only one match, against South Moluccas. West Papuans were listed to take part in the 2006 VIVA World Cup, but withdrew. The Football Association West Papua was founded in 2017.

The national team returned to action in 2019, playing a friendly against East Turkestan, after 14 years hiatus. On 25 January 2020, the F.A.W.P. was accepted in to ConIFA as its full member.

== Tournament records ==
Year	Position	GP	W	D	L	GS	GA
UNPO Cup
(Netherlands) 2005	Semifinal	1	0	1	0	1	1

== Matches played ==
23 June 2005 UNPO Cup	West Papua (Republic of West Papua)	1–1	South Moluccas	The Hague, Netherlands
				Stadium: Sportpark De Verademing

19 October 2019 Friendly	West Papua (Republic of West Papua)	2–8	East Turkestan	The Hague, Netherlands
14:00 CET	Rudy Gell de la Cruz 19'; Samuel Taria 88'		Ihtiyar Yusupov 8' 75'; Abdushukur Abduryin 25'; Salaydin Tursun 31'; Ripkat Bilal 35'; Alisher Tashmetov 39'; East Turkestan player 62'; Elzat Kader 86'	Stadium: Sportpark Nieuw Hanenburg

21 December 2019 2020 CONIFA World Cup qualification	West Papua	2–10	Tamil Eelam	The Hague, Netherlands
14:00 CET	Rudy Gell de la Cruz 37'; Kila Toilala 83'		Senthuran Uthayasuthan 1' 8' 52'; Nirunthan Sivananthan 42' 43' 44'; Steven Sacayaradj 52'; Mayooran Chelliah 70' (pen.)	Stadium: Sportpark Nieuw Hanenburg; Referee: Kees Ekelmann

23 October 2021 Friendly	West Papua	22–0	Katanga	The Hague, Netherlands
14:45 CET				Stadium: Sportpark Nieuw Hanenburg; Referee: Marcel de Kler

1 November 2022 Friendly	West Papua (Republic of West Papua)	5–5	TikTok United FC	The Hague, Netherlands
		Report		Stadium: Sportpark De Verademing

13 November 2022 Friendly	West Papua (Republic of West Papua)	1–1	Raetia	The Hague, Netherlands
				Stadium: Sportpark De Verademing

18 August 2023 Friendly	West Papua (Republic of West Papua)	5–2	Tibet	The Hague, Netherlands
				Stadium: Sportpark De Verademing
