= 2023 CONIFA Asian Football Cup =

Tournament details
- Host country: Alcochete (Portugal)
- Dates: August 4 – 8
- Teams: 3
- Venue: 1 (in 1 host city)

The 2023 CONIFA Asian Football Cup was the first edition of the CONIFA Asian Football Cup, an international football tournament for states, minorities, stateless peoples and regions unaffiliated with FIFA with an affiliation to Asia, organised by CONIFA. Tamil Eelam won the men's tournament beating Hmong FF to in their first title.

== Tournament ==
On August 2nd, 2023, CONIFA announced that Alcochete, Portugal will host the 2nd edition of the tournament and the schedule was provided for the tournament. A pre-tournament press conference was held on August 3rd 2023. A second stage of the tournament between Kashimir FA and the Pakistan All-Stars was supposed to be held later in the summer, but was cancelled.

== Participating teams ==
A total of three teams participated in the tournament.

Team
Tibet
Hmong FF
Tamil Eelam

== Group Stage ==
| Pos | Team | Pld | W | D | L | GF | GA | GD | Pts | Qualification |
|---|---|---|---|---|---|---|---|---|---|---|
| 1 | Tamil Eelam | 2 | 2 | 0 | 0 | 6 | 2 | +4 | 6 | Advance to the final |
| 2 | Hmong FF | 2 | 1 | 0 | 1 | 6 | 7 | −1 | 3 | Advance to the final |
| 3 | Tibet | 2 | 0 | 0 | 2 | 5 | 8 | −3 | 0 | |

Source: CONIFA

=== Matches ===
August 4, 2023
7:00 PM CST (UTC+1)

| Tamil Eelam | 3–0 | Hmong FF |
|---|---|---|
| 15'; 16'; 53' | Report |

Alcochete, Portugal

August 5, 2023
7:00 PM CST (UTC+1)

| Tibet | 4–5 | Hmong FF |
|---|---|---|
| Lhundup 23'; Norbu 54'; 65'; 90+3' (pen.) | Report | 2'; Yang 5' (pen.); 33'; 36'; 40' (pen.) |

Alcochete, Portugal

August 6, 2023
7:00 PM CST (UTC+1)

| Tamil Eelam | 3–1 | Tibet |
|---|---|---|
| 4'; 14'; 66' (pen.) | Report | 61' (pen.) |

Alcochete, Portugal

== Final ==
August 8, 2023
6:00 PM CST (UTC+1)

| Tamil Eelam | 3–1 | Hmong FF |
|---|---|---|
| Goal | Report | Goal |

Alcochete, Portugal

2023 CONIFA Asian Football Cup
(Tamil Eelam)
Tamil Eelam
1st title

== See also ==
- CONIFA
