= 2024 CONIFA Women's World Football Cup =

Tournament details
- Host country: Sapmi (official); Norway (location)
- City: Bodø
- Dates: 4–8 June 2024
- Teams: 3
- Venues: 2

Final positions
- Champions: Sápmi (2nd title)
- Runners-up: Tamil Eelam
- Third place: Székely Land

Tournament statistics
- Matches played: 7
- Goals scored: 23 (3.29 per match)
- Top scorer(s): Karoline Fosli; Eva-Alida Eliasson (4 goals)
- Best player: Dilaxsika Sundararajah

The 2024 CONIFA Women's World Football Cup is the second edition of the CONIFA Women's World Football Cup, an international football tournament for states, minorities, stateless peoples and regions unaffiliated with FIFA organised by CONIFA.

== Participants ==
The following teams were initially announced to participate in the tournament;

- Székely Land
- Tamil Eelam
- Sápmi (hosts)

=== Withdrawn ===
After initially being announced as participants, Kashmir and Northern Cyprus later withdrew from the competition with no official reason given. Tibet would also be removed from the tournament on the opening day after the team was unable to secure visa to travel aboard on time. These withdrawals would result in the tournament being reduced from the originally announced 6 participants to 3.

== Host ==
The tournament will be played above the Arctic Circle in northern Norway. The city of Bodø became selected as the European Capital of Culture in 2024 and as a part of the celebration, the city is hosting the CONIFA WWFC2024.

=== Venues ===
The group stage will be played at Mørkvedlia idrettspark, 15 minutes outside the city center. The area is closely connected to the Bodø University College.The final will be played in the home ground of FK Bodø/Glimt, the Aspmyra Stadium.

Mørkvedlia Idrettspark	Aspmyra Stadion
Capacity: 1,500	Capacity: 8,270
Mørkvedlia Idrettspark	Aspmyra_stadion

== Group stage ==
Pos	Team	Pld	W	D	L	GF	GA	GD	Pts	Qualification
1	Sápmi (H)	4	4	0	0	15	0	+15	12	Advance to the final
2	Tamil Eelam	4	1	1	2	3	12	−9	4	Advance to the final
3	Székely Land	4	0	1	3	2	8	−6	1	

Source: CONIFA
(H) Hosts

=== Matches ===
4 June 2024
14:00 CET
MD 1

Tamil Eelam	2–2	Székely Land
Dilaxsika 46', 79'	Report	Krall 44'; Kis 50'

Mørkvedlia Idrettspark

4 June 2024
23:00 CET
MD 1

Sápmi	2–0	Székely Land
W. Ritzen 50'; Fosli 80'	Report

Mørkvedlia Idrettspark

5 June 2024
14:00 CET
MD 2

Sápmi	2–0	Tamil Eelam
W. Ritzen 52'; Norlemann 90+3'

Mørkvedlia Idrettspark

5 June 2024
23:00 CET
MD 2

Székely Land	0–1	Tamil Eelam
		Dayaniah 87'

Mørkvedlia Idrettspark

6 June 2024
14:00 CET
MD 3

Székely Land	0–3	Sápmi
		Eliasson 2'; Sundqvist 11'; Johnsen 59'

Mørkvedlia Idrettspark

6 June 2024
23:00 CET
MD 3

Tamil Eelam	0–8	Sápmi
		Eliasson 2', 38'; Mannsverk 11'; Nygård 17', 22'; Fosli 20', 35', 48'

Mørkvedlia Idrettspark

== Final ==
8 June 2024
14:00 CET

Sápmi	2–1	Tamil Eelam
Holmestrand-Hætta 72' (pen.); Eliasson 86'		Dilaxsika 13'

Aspmyra Stadion

== Top goalscorers ==
=== 4 goals ===
- (Sápmi) Karoline Fosli
- (Sápmi) Eva-Alida Eliasson

=== 3 goals ===
- (Tamil Eelam) Dilaxsika Sundararajah

=== 2 goals ===
- (Sápmi) Wilma Ritzen
- (Sápmi) Thea Norkyn Nygård

=== 1 goal ===
- (Székely Land) Tímea Krall
- (Székely Land) Anita Kis
- (Sápmi) Klara Norlemann
- (Tamil Eelam) Dayaniah S.
- (Sápmi) Hilda Sundqvist
- (Sápmi) Ylva Johnsen
- (Sápmi) Jenny Marie Mannsverk
- (Sápmi) Marja Sofe Holmestrand Hætta
