= Tenzin Samdup =

Tibetan footballer

Personal information
- Date of birth: 23 December 1992 (age 33)
- Place of birth: Pune, India
- Position: Goalkeeper

Senior career*
Years	Team	Apps	(Gls)
2013	Goa-Tibetan		
2018–2019	Chennai City		
2019–2020	Real Kashmir		
2021–2023	Mumbai Kenkre	22	(0)
2023–2024	Namdhari FC	9+	(0)
2024	Malappuram FC	4	(0)

International career
2018–	Tibet	8	(0)
- * Club domestic league appearances and goals

Tenzin Samdup (born 23 December 1992) is a professional footballer who plays as a goalkeeper. Born in India, he represents the Tibet national team in CONIFA tournaments.

== Earlier career ==
Samdup began his professional career with Indian club Doeguling Youth Sports Association (DYSA), with which he won the 2008 GCM football cup in Gangtok. He later appeared with Goa-Tibetan, TNFA All-Stars club and Sikkim Akraman.

== Club career ==
=== Earlier career ===
Before signing for Chennai City in the Indian top flight, upon some unsuccessful trials with various teams, he worked as an English teacher for monks.

In 2018, he signed for Chennai City FC in the Indian I-League, where he made one league appearance before joining Real Kashmir. On 9 March 2019, Chennai City beat former champions Minerva Punjab FC 3–1 to be crowned the 2018–19 I-League champions. With Real Kashmir, he played in 2019–20 I-League season.

=== Mumbai Kenkre ===
On 1 September 2021, Tenzin signed for Mumbai Kenkre ahead of the I-League Qualifiers. Though the team missed out on promotion to the I-League, they eventually replaced Chennai City after they failed to comply with club licensing regulations.

On 4 March 2022, he made his first appearance in the I-League for the club, against his former club Real Kashmir, in a 1–1 draw. He was awarded the Hero of the Match for his outstanding display against Rajasthan United, on 25 March 2022, in 0–0 stalemate. The club finished in bottom after the phrase-1 and placed in relegation stage, achieved only 12 points and relegated to the 2022–23 I-League 2nd Division. Later in September, Kenkre was reinstated on sympathetic grounds by the AIFF and allowed to participate in the 2022–23 I-League season. They later went on to participate in Baji Raut Cup in Odisha, in which they reached semi-finals.

== International career ==
Samdup is a regular member of the Tibet national football team, a Non-FIFA international football team that represents Tibet. He appeared with Tibet at the 2018 CONIFA World Football Cup, one of few tournaments the team has ever competed in.

== Career statistics ==
=== Club ===
As of 22 February 2023

Club	Season	League			Cup		Continental		Total	
Club	Season	Division	Apps	Goals	Apps	Goals	Apps	Goals	Apps	Goals
Chennai City	2018–19	I-League	0	0	0	0	–		0	0
Real Kashmir	2019–20	I-League	0	0	0	0	–		0	0
Mumbai Kenkre	2021	I-League 2nd Division	6	0	0	0	–		6	0
Mumbai Kenkre	2021–22	I-League	9	0	0	0	–		9	0
Mumbai Kenkre	2022–23	I-League	7	0	0	0	–		7	0
Mumbai Kenkre	Kenkre total		22	0	0	0	0	0	22	0
Career total			22	0	0	0	0	0	22	0

== Honours ==
Doeguling Youth SA

- GCM Football Cup: 2018

Chennai City

- I-League: 2018–19

Kenkre

- I-League 2nd Division runner-up: 2021

Individual

- Sikkim Gold Cup Best Goalkeeper: 2017

== See also ==
- List of Tibetan footballers
