= Jey =

Jey may refer to:

Places

- Jey, Iran, a village in Alborz Province, Iran
- Jey Rural District, in Isfahan Province, Iran
  - Jey Shir, village in Jey Rural District
  - Jey Oil Refining Company, established in the district

People

- Alih Jey (born 1984), a Latin Grammy nominated Dominican Rock music singer and songwriter
- Clarence Jey (fl. 2000s–2020s), a Los Angeles–based Billboard Record Producer
- Jeffrey Jey (born Gianfranco Randone; 1970), an Italian singer, the former lead singer of the group Eiffel 65
- Jey Crisfar (born 1988), a Belgian actor
- Jey Kugeler (1910–1983), Luxembourgian gymnast
- Jey Parks (fl. 2010s), American comics artist
- Jey Siva (born 1988), English footballer
- Jey Uso (born 1985), American professional wrestler
- Khedrup Gelek Pelzang, 1st Panchen Lama (1385–1438 CE), also known as Khedrup Jey

JEY refers to:

- Jersey, ISO-3166-1 alpha 3 code

== See also ==
- Jay (disambiguation)
- Je (disambiguation)
