= 2025 CONIFA Asian Football Cup =

Tournament details
- Host country: London (England)
- Dates: 1–4 July
- Teams: 3
- Venue: 1 (in 1 host city)

The 2025 CONIFA Asian Football Cup was the second edition of the CONIFA Asian Football Cup, an international football tournament for states, minorities, stateless peoples and regions unaffiliated with FIFA with an affiliation to Asia, organised by CONIFA. Tamil Eelam won the men's tournament beating East Turkestan.

== Tournament ==
On March 28, 2025, CONIFA announced that Tamil Eelam will host the 2nd edition of the tournament. It also announced that there will be three women's teams participating in a separate tournament, the CONIFA Women's Asian Football Cup, but at the same location and dates, but it was later cancelled. Matches were played in Walton-on-Thames, London.

== Venue ==
Walton-on-Thames, Surrey	Elmbridge Xcel Sports Hub is located in Surrey
Elmbridge Xcel Sports Hub	Elmbridge Xcel Sports Hub is located in Surrey
51.3993722°N 0.4112307°W	Elmbridge Xcel Sports Hub is located in Surrey
Capacity: 2,097	Elmbridge Xcel Sports Hub is located in Surrey

== Participating teams ==
=== Men's Tournament ===
A total of three teams participated in the men's tournament.

Team
Tibet
East Turkestan
Tamil Eelam

=== Women's Tournament ===
A total of three teams were going to participate in the women's tournament.

Team
Hmong FF
Girl Power Organisation (Afghanistan)
Tamil Eelam

However, it was later cancelled due to Hmong FF withdrawing.

== Group Stage ==
Pos	Team	Pld	W	D	L	GF	GA	GD	Pts	Qualification
1	Tamil Eelam	2	2	0	0	6	1	+5	6	Advance to the final
2	East Turkestan	2	1	0	1	7	6	+1	3	Advance to the final
3	Tibet	2	0	0	2	4	10	−6	0	

Source: CONIFA

=== Matches ===
July 1, 2025
5:30 PM BST (UTC+1)

Tamil Eelam	4–0	Tibet
5'; 34'; 59'; 73'	Report

Walton-on-Thames, London

July 2, 2025
2:30 PM BST (UTC+1)

Tamil Eelam	2–1	East Turkestan
40'; 53'	Report	89'

Walton-on-Thames, London

July 3, 2025
2:30 PM BST (UTC+1)

Tibet	4–6	East Turkestan
Goal	Report	Goal

Walton-on-Thames, London

== Final ==
July 4, 2025
5:30 PM BST (UTC+1)

Tamil Eelam	5–0	East Turkestan
Goal	Report

Walton-on-Thames, London

2025 CONIFA Asian Football Cup
(Tamil Eelam)
Tamil Eelam
2nd title

== See also ==
- CONIFA
