= CONIFA Asia Cup =

International football tournament

- Founded: 2023
- Region: International (Asia) (Confederation of Independent Football Associations)
- Current champions: Tamil Eelam
- Most championships: Tamil Eelam (2 titles)
- 2025 CONIFA Asian Football Cup

The CONIFA Asia Cup is a continental football tournament organized by CONIFA for representative teams of nations, minorities, and isolated regions within Asia that are unaffiliated with FIFA. While the tournament focuses on the Asian continent, it has a global scope with participating ethnic communities from North America and Europe.

== History ==
Map of CONIFA Asia Football Cup Locations

=== Lisbon 2023 ===
CONIFA announced the first Asia Cup, featuring 3 teams, would be held in August 2023 with games played at Alcochete, near Lisbon, a second stage was announced to be played in the UK was never held.

=== London 2025 ===
CONIFA announced a second edition of the Asia Cup would be held in July 2025 with games played in Walton-on-Thames, near London. The tournament would again feature 3 participating teams.

== Results ==
Ed.	Year	Host	First place game			Third place game			Num. teams
Ed.	Year	Host	(gold) Champion	Score	(silver) Runner-up	(bronze) Third	Score	Fourth	Num. teams
1	2023	Portugal	Tamil Eelam FA	2–0	Hmong FF	Tibetan NSA	—N/a		3
2	2025	England	Tamil Eelam FA	5–0	East Turkistan FA	Tibetan NSA	—N/a		3

== Appearances ==
Legend

- 1st — Champions
- 2nd — Runners-up
- 3rd — Third place
- 4th — Fourth place
- GS — Group Stage
- q — Qualified for upcoming tournament
- •• — Qualified but withdrew
- • — Did not qualify
- × — Did not enter / Withdrew / Banned / Entry not accepted by CONIFA
- — Hosts

For each tournament, the number of teams in each finals tournament (in brackets) are shown.

CONIFA Asian Football Cup record
Team (Total 4 teams)	2023 (Portugal) (3)	2025 (England) (3)
East Turkistan FA	x	2nd
Hmong FF	2nd	x
Tamil Eelam FA	1st	1st
Tibetan NSA	3rd	3rd

== Members of CONIFA Asia ==
Asia (11)
East Turkistan FA
Girl Power FA (Afghanistan)
Hmong FF
Kashmir FA
Kurdistan FA
Pakistan All-Stars
Palestinian Refugee FI
Panjab FA
Rojava FA
Tamil Eelam FA
Tibetan NSA
