= Tibetan National Football Association =

Football association founded in 2001

- Founded: 2001
- FIFA affiliation: N/A

The Tibetan National Football Association (TNFA) was founded in 2001, soon after the authorization was delivered by the Kashag (the Tibet Cabinet), and registration under Indian law. Jetsun Pema, the sister of the 14th Dalai Lama is the president of the association, Thupten Dorjee the secretary, and Kalsang Dhondup the executive secretary. The association is now organizing the Gyalyum Chenmo Memorial Gold Cup GCMGC football tournament which existed already in the 1980s. In 2003, the 17th Karmapa was the chief guest on the first day of the tournament which took place at the Tibetan Children's Village in Dharamsala. Mr. Shrikant Baldi, Deputy Commissioner of Kangra, was the chief guest in 2004 for the tournament. The 13th GCMGC, took place in 2007, and the chief guest was Khenchen Menling Tri Rinpoche of Mendroling Monastery. The 14th took place in 2008, and the chief guest was Khyabje Ling Rinpoche.

In 2025, they participated in All India Governor's Cup in Gangtok, Sikkim.

== See also ==
- Tibet national football team
- Tibet women's national football team
- History of football in Tibet and the diaspora
