= Tamil Eelam national cricket team =

Sri Lankan cricket team

The Tamil Eelam national cricket team (Tamil: தமிழீழத் தேசிய கிரிக்கெட் அணி) is the national team of Tamil Eelam. The team, which consists of semi-professional and amateur players drawn from the Eelam Tamil diaspora community in various countries. Tamil Eelam is not affiliated with ICC and therefore cannot compete for the ICC Cricket World Cup. The team plays in various tournaments such as the 'Last Man Stands'.

In the 'Last Man Stands' tournament, the team has played 15 games and won 12 and lost 3. The winning ratio of the team is 80%.

== Tamil Eelam team squad for Last Man Stands Australia Open 2015 ==
- Kapilthev Thevarasa (c)
- Mohan Kanthanathan
- Soba Mahes
- Bill Clinton Murfin
- Prashanth Velayutham
- Kopi Parameswaran
- Sutharsan Kanthanathan
- Nitharsan Ariyarathnam

== See also ==
- Transnational Government of Tamil Eelam
- Tamil Eelam national football team
