= 2022 CONIFA Women's World Football Cup =

Tournament details
- Host country: Tibet (official); India (location)
- Dates: 1–3 July 2022
- Teams: 2
- Venue: 1 (in Paonta Sahib host cities)

Final positions
- Champions: Sápmi (1st title)
- Runners-up: Tibet

The 2022 CONIFA Women's World Football Cup was the first edition of the CONIFA Women's World Football Cup, an international football tournament for states, minorities, stateless peoples and regions unaffiliated with FIFA organised by CONIFA. It was cancelled following the COVID-19 pandemic and reorganised for July 2022.

== Participants ==
The following teams were initially announced to participate in the tournament during CONIFA's Football Strategy event in Sabbioneta, Italy;

- Tibet (Host)
- Sápmi

=== Withdrawn ===
After initially being announced as participants, some teams dropped out prior to kick off. Matabeleland reported issues with visas to participate, but no reason was given for Székely Land's withdrawal. No official statement was issued by CONIFA.

- Matabeleland
- Székely Land

== Matches ==
1 July 2022
20:00 GMT+5:30

Tibet	1–13	Sápmi
Oetso 59'		Simonsen; Ohman; Fossli; Sorensen

3 July 2022
20:00 GMT+5:30

Sápmi	9–0	Tibet
Ohman 7', 57', 71', 89'; Kristiansen 38'; Norlemann 43'; Simonsen 46', 83'; Ritzen 48'

== Top scorers ==
=== 8 Goals ===
- (Sápmi) Moa Öhman

=== 7 Goals ===
- (Sápmi) Sandra Simonsen

=== 3 Goals ===
- (Sápmi) Karoline Fossli

=== 1 Goal ===
- (Tibet) Ngawang Oetso
- (Sápmi) Sofie Sorensen
- (Sápmi) Emelie Kristiansen
- (Sápmi) Klara Norlemann
- (Sápmi) Wilma Ritzen
