= The Forbidden Team =

The Forbidden Team 2003 Danish: Det forbudte landshold
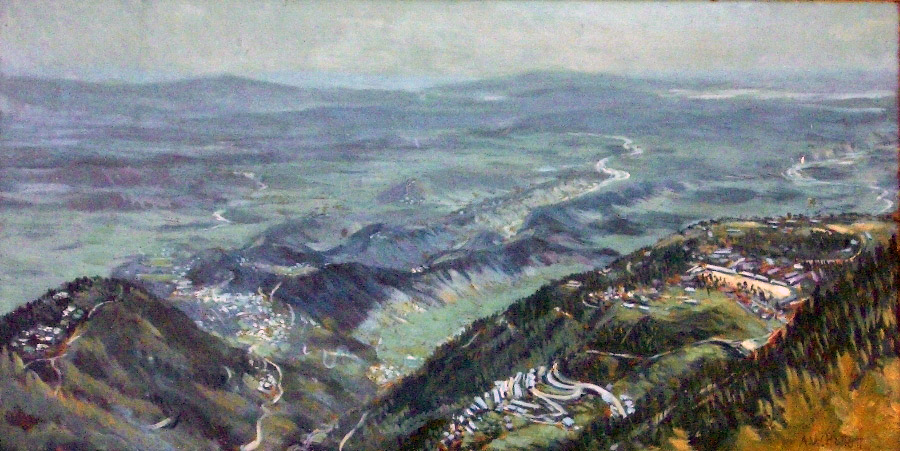
- Looking down over Dharamshala and Beas River
- Directed by: Rasmus Dinesen, Arnold Krøjgaard
- Produced by: Karim Stoumann, Joanna Din Mitchew
- Starring: Jens Espensen, Michael Nybrandt, 14th Dalai Lama
- Distributed by: TV2
- Release date: 27 May 2003 (Copenhagen)
- Running time: 57 minutes
- Countries: Denmark; India
- Language: Danish

The Forbidden Team (Danish: Det forbudte landshold) is a 2003 Danish documentary film directed by Rasmus Dinesen and Arnold Krøjgaard. The leading cast consists of association football trainers Jens Espensen and Michael Nybrandt, the Tibet national football team and at the conclusion the Greenland national football team. Star-part is being played by the 14th Dalai Lama.

The film was rewarded as the Best Feature Film on the Krasnogorski International Filmfestival in Moscow, Special Mention on the FID in Marseille and the Audience Award on the International Sport Movies & TV Festival in Milan. The final match against Greenland was broadcast live by the radio station Free Tibet.

== Plot ==
The documentary film was shot at the preamble to the football international match of June 30, 2000, between Tibet and Greenland. For the Tibetans in exile this was the first international match after many decades since the former national team had broken up.

The film starts from the moment of the first training sessions in Dharamshala in northern India and ends with the last whistle of the match in Copenhagen, Denmark. The match was won by Greenland with 4–1.

The Tibetan Buddhist background of the players is notable in the game mentality of the players who don't show any aggression. This invokes scenes of the trainer. He believes in discipline, hard-working and a strong winners mentality.

== See also ==
- The Cup
- Dreaming Lhasa
