= East Turkestan national football team =

Men's association football team

East Turkistan
- Association: East Turkistan Football Association
- Confederation: CONIFA
- Head coach: Elshat Eslam
- Top scorer: Ihtiyar Yusupov (2)

First international
- East Turkestan 8–2 West Papua (The Hague, Netherlands; 19 October 2019)

Biggest win
- East Turkestan 8–2 West Papua (The Hague, Netherlands; 19 October 2019)

Biggest defeat
- Tamil Eelam 5–0 East Turkestan (Walton-on-Thames, England; 4 July 2025)

CONIFA Asian Football Cup
- Appearances: 1 (first in 2025)
- Best result: 2nd (2025)

The East Turkestan national football team (competing as East Turkistan and formerly as Uyghur) is an association football team representing East Turkestan, a historically independent region corresponding to what is now Xinjiang, China. It is governed by the East Turkistan Football Association (ETFA), formed in 2019 by various Uyghur diaspora football leagues and clubs in North America and Europe.

East Turkestan is a member of the Confederation of Independent Football Associations (CONIFA), an international federation of non-FIFA-affiliated football teams. East Turkestan played its first international match against West Papua in 2019, winning 8–2.

== History ==
The first Uyghur football clubs among the diaspora were founded in the 2000s, the very first being the Virginia-based Uyghur United FC, which played its first international match in 2008 against another Uyghur team in Toronto, Canada.

The idea to create a football association for Uyghurs and other Turkic peoples from East Turkestan first emerged in 2014 after extensive discussions and collaboration between Uyghur diaspora football clubs in North America and Europe. The East Turkistan Football Association (ETFA) was subsequently formed in 2019 as an umbrella organization for various Uyghur diaspora football leagues and clubs. The ETFA's goal was to qualify an East Turkestan national team for the Confederation of Independent Football Associations (CONIFA), an international federation of football teams not affiliated with FIFA.

East Turkestan played its first international match in The Hague on 19 October 2019, winning 8–2 against West Papua. Two months later, on 14 December 2019, East Turkestan played a qualification match for the 2020 CONIFA World Cup against Tamil Eelam in Cergy, France, that ended with a 0–3 loss. The team debuted in the CONIFA Asian Football Cup in 2025, held in Walton-on-Thames, England. East Turkestan competed in a three-team round-robin against Tamil Eelam and Tibet.
