= Tibet national football team =

Men's national association football team representing Tibet

Tibet
- Nickname: The Forbiddens
- Association: Tibetan National Football Association
- Confederation: CONIFA
- Head coach: Gompo Dorjee
- Most caps: Tenzin Samdup; BK Narayan (9)
- Top scorer: Tashi Samphel (5)
First colours	Second colours

First international
- Official; Nepal 4–0 Tibet (China; 6 November 1972); Official; Greenland 4–1 Tibet (Copenhagen, Denmark; 30 June 2001)

Biggest win
- Tibet 12–2 Western Sahara (Marseille, France; 28 June 2013)

CONIFA World Football Cup
- Appearances: 1 (first in 2018)
- Best result: 1st Place, 2018

The Tibet national football team represents the cultural region of Tibet in non-FIFA international football. The team is organised by the Tibetan National Football Association (TNFA), an association of exiled Tibetans founded in 2001, and is a member of the Confederation of Independent Football Associations (CONIFA), the governing body for national and regional sides outside FIFA. Neither FIFA nor the Asian Football Confederation recognise Tibet as an independent footballing nation, and the side, nicknamed "The Forbiddens", draws much of its playing pool from Tibetan communities in exile, including those represented by the Central Tibetan Administration.

Tibet have never competed in a FIFA-sanctioned tournament and do not appear on the official FIFA World Ranking. On the unofficial World Football Elo Ratings, the side has fluctuated between a high of 174th, recorded in November 1972, and a low of 228th, reached in 2018. Beyond friendlies, the team's only sustained participation in organised competition has come through CONIFA, where their best result remains a group-stage exit at every attempt, and through one-off invitational tournaments such as the 2006 FIFI Wild Cup and the 2013 International Tournament of Peoples, Cultures and Tribes.

== History ==
=== Early encounters (1972–1979) ===
The earliest recorded fixtures involving a Tibetan representative side date to the early 1970s, almost three decades before the TNFA was formally established. Tibet's first such match, played in China on 6 November 1972, ended in a 4–0 defeat to Nepal. The two sides met twice more later in the decade, both at the Dasharath Rangasala in Kathmandu: a 2–3 loss on 7 June 1979 was followed two days later by a narrower 1–2 defeat in the return fixture.

=== The Forbidden Team (2001) ===
To assemble a side capable of representing Tibet on the international stage, the TNFA held a selection tournament in Dehradun, India, bringing together players from the various Tibetan football teams scattered across the country. Once a squad had been chosen, the players travelled to Dharamsala to begin training. Jens Espense was engaged by the TNFA to coach the side but was given only a month to prepare a group of players who had not previously competed at even a minor league level. Conditions were difficult throughout: the training pitch sat on a public road and only half of it could be used. Meanwhile, Karma Nyodup worked to secure the travel documentation the squad would need to fly to Denmark, a process that saw several players dropped from the party after failing to obtain the necessary papers.

The fixture itself, Tibet's first against opposition from outside Asia, was arranged by the Danish organiser Michael Nybrandt, who continued to advocate for the match even as the Chinese government, which regards Tibet as part of China, made clear its opposition and threatened to suspend trade with Denmark should the game go ahead. Denmark allowed the match to proceed regardless, and on 30 June 2001 Tibet played their first international against a non-Asian side, going down 1–4 to Greenland in Copenhagen in front of 5,000 spectators, with Norbu scoring Tibet's goal. The build-up to the match, and the obstacles the squad overcame along the way, were later documented in the film The Forbidden Team.

A fortnight later, on 14 July 2001, Tibet played their second fixture outside Asia, losing 1–2 to Monaco at the Dreisamstadion in Freiburg.

=== Wilderness years (2002–2009) ===
Fixtures were sparse in the years that followed. Between 2002 and 2005, Tibet played only a single match, a 1–2 friendly defeat to a Sikkim representative side at the Paljor Stadium in Gangtok on 10 October 2003.

Tibet's first appearance in a recognised invitational tournament came at the 2006 FIFI Wild Cup in Hamburg, Germany. They opened with a heavy 0–7 defeat to FC St. Pauli at the Millerntor-Stadion on 30 May 2006, watched by 400 spectators, before losing their second and final match of the tournament 0–5 to Gibraltar at the same venue the following day.

Later that year, Tibet travelled to Cyprus to compete in the ELF Cup, where they lost all three of their matches: 0–3 to Tajikistan on 19 November, 0–1 to the Crimean Tatars the following day, and 0–10 to Northern Cyprus in their final group game on 21 November.

Tibet recorded their first victory of any kind in 2007, defeating a Delhi XI 6–0 in a friendly at Kirori Mal College in New Delhi on 4 August. Later that year they faced Bhutan in a pair of friendlies at the Paljor Stadium in Gangtok, drawing the first 2–2 on 31 October before losing the return match 0–3 two days later.

Tibet toured the Netherlands in April 2008, losing 0–5 to VDL-Maassluis in Maassluis before drawing 1–1 with JEKA Breda in Breda days later. The following month brought a heavier defeat in Italy, where Tibet went down 2–13 to Padania in Milan.

=== International Tournament of Peoples, Cultures and Tribes (2013) ===
In 2013, Tibet were invited to Marseille, France, to take part in the inaugural International Tournament of Peoples, Cultures and Tribes, held between 22 and 29 June. The tournament brought a mixture of heavy defeats and a historic victory. Tibet were beaten 0–21 by Quebec on 23 June and 0–22 by Provence the following day, before recovering to claim a 12–2 win over the Sahrawi Arab Democratic Republic on 28 June — Tibet's biggest victory and, at the time, only their second win in international history. The result was enough to see Tibet finish fifth in the competition.

=== CONIFA and the modern era (2018–present) ===
Tibet joined CONIFA and entered the 2018 CONIFA World Football Cup in London after qualifying via a wild card. Drawn in a group alongside Kárpátalja, Northern Cyprus and Abkhazia, Tibet lost all three fixtures, conceding eleven goals and scoring two: a 0–3 defeat to Abkhazia on 31 May, a 1–3 loss to Northern Cyprus on 2 June, in which Topgyal scored for Tibet, and a 1–5 defeat to Kárpátalja on 3 June, Yougyal getting Tibet's goal. Bottom of their group, Tibet moved into the placement rounds, first losing a friendly 0–4 to a London Turkish Select side on 5 June before facing Kabylia, who beat them 8–1, Topgyal converting a penalty for Tibet's consolation. In their final placement match Tibet drew 1–1 with the United Koreans in Japan after Yougyal cancelled out an own goal, only to lose 4–1 on penalties.

Tibet made their first appearance at the CONIFA Asia Cup in 2023, held in Portugal. They lost 4–5 to Hmong FF in their opening match on 5 August before going down 1–3 to Tamil Eelam the following day, a result that eliminated them from the competition. Despite the early exit, Tibet's performance was sufficient to secure qualification for the planned 2024 CONIFA World Cup, though the tournament was later cancelled after the prospective hosts, São Paulo, failed to demonstrate the necessary organisational or financial capacity. Shortly after the 2023 Asia Cup, Tibet were beaten 2–5 in a friendly against West Papua in The Hague on 18 August.

Tibet returned to the CONIFA Asia Cup in 2025, again held in London, and again finished bottom of a three-team group, losing 0–4 to Tamil Eelam on 1 July and 4–6 to East Turkestan two days later. Later that year, Tibet competed outside the CONIFA structure for the first time, entering the 2025 Sikkim Gold Cup hosted by the Sikkim Football Association in India. Their campaign ended at the first hurdle, a 0–4 defeat to Sikkim Dragon of the Sikkim Premier League in the qualifying round on 17 November.

== Team image ==
=== Colours ===
Tibet's home colours consist of navy blue shirts and body with white shorts and white socks. The team's away strip is entirely maroon, shirt, shorts and socks alike.

== Home venue ==
As a team representing a diaspora community rather than a recognised state, Tibet does not maintain a fixed home stadium. Ahead of their inaugural international fixture in 2001, the squad assembled for training in Dharamsala, India, and the side has since played its matches at neutral or host-nation venues across Asia and Europe, including grounds in Denmark, Germany, Cyprus, the Netherlands, Italy, France, Portugal, the United Kingdom and India.

== Results and fixtures ==
The following is a selected list of Tibet's recorded international and representative match results, organised by decade.

Win Draw Loss

=== 1970s ===
6 November 1972 Friendly	Tibet	0–4	Nepal	China
				Attendance: —

7 June 1979 Friendly	Tibet	2–3	Nepal	Dasharath Rangasala, Kathmandu
	Unknown			Attendance: —

9 June 1979 Friendly	Tibet	1–2	Nepal	Dasharath Rangasala, Kathmandu
	Unknown			Attendance: —

=== 2000s ===
30 June 2001 Friendly	Tibet	1–4	Greenland	Vanløse Idrætspark, Copenhagen
	Norbu			Attendance: 5000

14 July 2001 Friendly	Tibet	1–2	Monaco	Dreisamstadion, Freiburg
	Unknown

10 October 2003 Friendly	Tibet	1–2	Sikkim	Paljor Stadium, Gangtok
	Unknown

30 May 2006 FIFI Wild Cup	Tibet	0–7	FC St. Pauli	Millerntor-Stadion, Hamburg
				Attendance: 400

31 May 2006 FIFI Wild Cup	Tibet	0–5	Gibraltar	Millerntor-Stadion, Hamburg
				Attendance: 400

19 November 2006 ELF Cup	Tibet	0–3	Tajikistan (F)	Zafer Stadium, Güzelyurt

20 November 2006 ELF Cup	Tibet	0–1	Crimean Tatars	Zafer Stadium, Güzelyurt

21 November 2006 ELF Cup	Tibet	0–10	Northern Cyprus	Mağusa Dr. Fazıl Küçük Stadium, Gazimağusa

4 August 2007 Friendly	Tibet	6–0	(India) Delhi XI	Kirori Mal College, New Delhi
	Unknown

31 October 2007 Friendly	Tibet	2–2	Bhutan	Paljor Stadium, Gangtok, Sikkim
	Unknown

2 November 2007 Friendly	Tibet	0–3	Bhutan	Paljor Stadium, Gangtok, Sikkim

17 April 2008 Friendly	VDL-Maassluis (Netherlands)	5–0	Tibet	Maassluis, South Holland

19 April 2008 Friendly	JEKA Breda (Netherlands)	1–1	Tibet	Breda, North Brabant
	Unknown

7 May 2008 Friendly	Padania	13–2	Tibet	Milan
	Unknown

=== 2010s ===
23 June 2013 International Tournament of Peoples, Cultures and Tribes	Quebec	21–0	Tibet	Marseille, France

24 June 2013 International Tournament of Peoples, Cultures and Tribes	Provence	22–0	Tibet	Marseille, France

28 June 2013 International Tournament of Peoples, Cultures and Tribes	Western Sahara	2–12	Tibet	Marseille, France
	Unknown

31 May 2018 2018 CONIFA World Football Cup – Group Stage	Abkhazia	3–0	Tibet	Queen Elizabeth II Stadium, Enfield
12:00 BST	Akhvlediani 12'; Maskayev 61'; Shoniya 77'	Report		Referee: Raymond Mashamba

2 June 2018 2018 CONIFA World Football Cup – Group Stage	Northern Cyprus	3–1	Tibet	Queen Elizabeth II Stadium, Enfield
17:00 BST	Turan 2', 67'; Gök 73'	Report	Topgyal 38'	Referee: John McCallum

3 June 2018 2018 CONIFA World Football Cup – Group Stage	Kárpátalja	5–1	Tibet	Larges Lane, Bracknell
15:00 BST	Gajdos 2'; G. Sándor 36' (pen.); Takács 42', 77'; Svedjuk 75'	Report	Yougyal 69'	Referee: Raymond Mashamba

5 June 2018 Friendly	London Turkish Select (Turkey)	4–0	Tibet	Hayes Lane, Bromley
15:00 BST	Nalbant; Ali Avci	Report		Referee: Mario Guastafierro

7 June 2018 2018 CONIFA World Football Cup – Placement Round	Tibet	1–8	Kabylia	Queen Elizabeth II Stadium, Enfield
12:00 BST	Topgyal 43' (pen.)	Report	Baudia 25', 74', 77', 87'; Hadid 45'; Mezaib 49', 51'; Bouabbas 81'	Referee: Clément Auclair

9 June 2018 2018 CONIFA World Football Cup – Placement Round	Tibet	1–1 (1–4 p)	United Korean	St Paul's Sports Ground, Rotherhithe
12:00 BST	Yougyal 20'	Report	Gelek 84' (o.g.)	Referee: Ivan Mrkalj

=== 2020s ===
5 August 2023 2023 CONIFA Asian Cup	Hmong FF	5–4	Tibet	Alcochete, Portugal
7:00 PM CET

6 August 2023 2023 CONIFA Asian Cup	Tibet	1–3	Tamil Eelam	Alcochete, Portugal
7:00 PM CET

18 August 2023 Friendly	West Papua (Republic of West Papua)	5–2	Tibet	The Hague, Netherlands
				Stadium: Sportpark De Verademing

1 July 2025 2025 CONIFA Asian Cup	Tamil Eelam	4-0	Tibet	Walton-on-Thames, Surrey
				Stadium: Elmbridge Sports Hub

3 July 2025 2025 CONIFA Asian Cup	Tibet	4–6	East Turkestan	Walton-on-Thames, Surrey
				Stadium: Elmbridge Sports Hub

17 November 2025 2025 Sikkim Gold Cup	Tibet	0–4	Sikkim Dragon	Gangtok, Sikkim
12:00 IST				Stadium: Paljor Stadium

== Technical staff ==
As of June 2026

Staff
Head coach	(Tibet) Gompo Dorjee

Tibet's first head coach was Jens Espense, engaged by the TNFA on a short-term basis to prepare the squad for their inaugural fixture against Greenland in 2001.

== Administration ==
=== General secretaries of the TNFA ===
Name	Period
(Tibet) Kelsang Dhondup	2001–2017
(Tibet) Passang Dorjee	2017–

== Players ==
The following players were named in the squad for the 2025 CONIFA Asian Football Cup in London.

No.	Pos.	Player	Date of birth (age)	Caps	Goals	Club
21	GK	Tenzin Tsewang				(United States Soccer Federation) Bay Area Friends Tibet
1	GK	Tenzin Kalsang				(United States Soccer Federation) Tibet FC
2	DF	Tenzin Osaki				(Canadian Soccer Association) SC Toronto
3	DF	Tenzing Wangyal	4 September 1995 (age 31)	2	0	(United States Soccer Federation) New York Shockers
16	DF	Sam Rinchen	17 January 2008 (age 18)			(Royal Belgian Football Association) Sportkring Sint-Niklaas
18	DF	Tenzin Choepak	7 January 1996 (age 30)			Unattached
29	DF	Tenzin Kunsang				Unattached
30	DF	Tenzin Tsultrim				(United States Soccer Federation) FC Rangzen
8	MF	Tenzin Dechance				Unattached
11	MF	Lennox Tendhar				(Scottish Football Association) East Craigie
19	MF	Tenzin Namdol				(United States Soccer Federation) DV7 Soccer Academy
24	MF	Karma Bhagentsang				(Canadian Soccer Association) Oakville SC
59	MF	Tenzin Passang				Unattached
7	FW	Tenzing Thabke	16 November 1995 (age 31)	2	1	Unattached
9	FW	Tenzing Chodak				(United States Soccer Federation) Tibet FC
10	FW	Tenzin Yougyal	12 August 1993 (age 33)			Unattached
63	FW	Tenzin Thaye				(The Football Association) United Tibet

== Player records ==
Tenzin Samdup and BK Narayan share the record for the most appearances for Tibet, with nine caps apiece, while Tashi Samphel is the side's all-time leading goalscorer, with five goals.

== Head-to-head record ==
Last match updated: Sikkim Dragon FC on 17 November 2025.

More wins Wins equal losses More losses

The table below totals every fixture recorded in this article; as a non-FIFA side, Tibet's complete historical playing record has not been comprehensively catalogued, so the figures below should be read as a record of known results rather than an exhaustive history.

Opponent	Played	Won	Drawn	Lost	For	Against	Diff	Win %	Loss %
Abkhazia	1	0	0	1	0	3	−3	0%	100%
Bhutan	2	0	1	1	2	5	−3	0%	50%
Crimean Tatars	1	0	0	1	0	1	−1	0%	100%
Delhi XI	1	1	0	0	6	0	+6	100%	0%
East Turkestan	1	0	0	1	4	6	−2	0%	100%
St. Pauli	1	0	0	1	0	7	−7	0%	100%
Gibraltar	1	0	0	1	0	5	−5	0%	100%
Greenland	1	0	0	1	1	4	−3	0%	100%
Hmong FF	1	0	0	1	4	5	−1	0%	100%
JEKA Breda	1	0	1	0	1	1	0	0%	0%
Kabylia	1	0	0	1	1	8	−7	0%	100%
Kárpátalja	1	0	0	1	1	5	−4	0%	100%
London Turkish Select	1	0	0	1	0	4	−4	0%	100%
Monaco	1	0	0	1	1	2	−1	0%	100%
Nepal	3	0	0	3	3	9	−6	0%	100%
Northern Cyprus	2	0	0	2	1	13	−12	0%	100%
Padania	1	0	0	1	2	13	−11	0%	100%
Provence	1	0	0	1	0	22	−22	0%	100%
Quebec	1	0	0	1	0	21	−21	0%	100%
DR Sahrawi Arab	1	1	0	0	12	2	+10	100%	0%
Sikkim	1	0	0	1	1	2	−1	0%	100%
Sikkim Dragon	1	0	0	1	0	4	−4	0%	100%
Tajikistan	1	0	0	1	0	3	−3	0%	100%
Tamil Eelam	2	0	0	2	1	7	−6	0%	100%
United Koreans in Japan (Note: Lost 1–4 on penalties.)	1	0	1	0	1	1	0	0%	0%
VDL-Maassluis	1	0	0	1	0	5	−5	0%	100%
West Papua	1	0	0	1	2	5	−3	0%	100%
Total	32	2	2	28	44	163	−119	6.25%	87.50%

== Rankings ==
=== Elo ratings ===
As a team outside FIFA, Tibet does not appear on the official FIFA World Ranking, and the side's playing strength is instead tracked through the unofficial World Football Elo Ratings. Tibet's highest-ever position, 174th, was recorded on 6 November 1972, in the immediate aftermath of their first match against Nepal, at a time when comparatively few national teams were rated. The team's lowest point came in 2018, when their participation in the CONIFA World Football Cup saw them slip to 228th.

== Honours ==
=== Regional ===
- ANFA Cup runners-up (1): 1985
- Ladakh Climate Cup runners-up (1): 2023

=== CONIFA ===
- CONIFA Asian Football Cup third place (2): 2023, 2025
