= Hmong FF =

Non-FIFA independent football association

Hmong
- Association: Hmong FF
- Confederation: ConIFA
- Head coach: Tay Vang

First international
- Tamil Eelam 3–0 Hmong FF (Alcochete, Portugal; 4 August 2023)

Biggest win
- Hmong FF 5–4 Tibet (Alcochete, Portugal; 5 August 2023)

Biggest defeat
- Tamil Eelam 3–0 Hmong FF (Alcochete, Portugal; 4 August 2023)

CONIFA World Football Cup
- Appearances: 1 (first in 2024)
- Best result: Debut (2024)

CONIFA Asia Cup
- Appearances: 1 (first in 2023)
- Best result: Runners-up (2023)

The Hmong Futbol Federation represents the Hmong people, an ethnic group originally from East and Southeast Asia. They are not affiliated with FIFA and therefore cannot compete for the FIFA World Cup. Instead, they are part of ConIFA and can compete in their competitions.

== History ==
Hmong joined ConIFA in 2023. They played their first game in the CONIFA Asia Cup, losing 3-0 to Tamil Eelam. They bounced back in the second game, beating Tibet 5-4. They eventually lost the final 3-1, to Tamil Eelam. However, they still managed to qualify for the 2024 CONIFA World Football Cup.

== Notable players ==
- Brian Vang
- Magic Vang
