= Women's Viva World Cup =

Women Viva World Cup
- Founded: 2008
- Region: International (NF-Board)
- Current champions: Padania
- Most championships: Sápmi, Padania (1 title each)

The Women Viva World Cup is an international women's football tournament organized by the N.F.-Board, an umbrella association for nations unaffiliated with FIFA. It was played twice in 2008 and 2010 with only two teams; and failed to take place three times in 2011, 2013 and 2018.

== History ==
=== Sápmi 2008 ===
The first edition, with only two teams, was won by the host, Sápmi, who beat Kurdistan over two legs with an aggregate score of 15–1.

All times are Central European Summer Time (UTC+2)

2008-07-10
18:00

Sápmi	4–0	(Kurdistan Region) Kurdistan
Skulbørstad

Malmberget Stadium, Malmberget

2008-07-13
11:00

Sápmi	11–1	(Kurdistan Region) Kurdistan
Skulbørstad; Eira; Hallen; Esseryd; Oscarsson; Fosshaug

Gällivare Stadium, Gällivare

=== Gozo 2010 ===
The second edition, again with only two teams, was won by Padania, who beat the host Gozo over two legs with an aggregate score of 7–0.

June 4, 2010

Padania	4–0	Gozo
Lupi 13'; Baroni 50'; Colamanco 68'; Laterza 77'

June 5, 2010

Padania	3–0	Gozo
Povia 10', 40'; Iostioni 78'

=== Cancelled tournaments ===
- 2011 Women Viva World Cup in Padania (Padania backed out for unknown reasons)
- 2013 Women Viva World Cup in Tifariti, Western Sahara (Announced in 2013, however was also cancelled for unknown reasons)
- 2018 Women Viva World Cup in Vichy, France (announced in 2017, however cancelled due to snags in the negotiation process between the NFB and the authorities of Vichy)

== See also ==
- Viva World Cup
- Island Games
- Non-FIFA football
