= Jey Siva =

English footballer (born 1988)

Personal information
- Full name: Jeyasiva Sivapathasundaram
- Date of birth: 23 March 1988 (age 38)
- Place of birth: Denmark
- Position: Defender

Senior career*
Years	Team	Apps	(Gls)
2010–2013	Enfield Town		
2013–2014	Wealdstone		
2014–2016	Grays Athletic	2+	
2016–2017	Cray Wanderers		
2017	Tonbridge Angels		
2017–2018	Harlow Town		
2018–2020	Heybridge Swifts		
2020–2022	Canvey Island	2+	
2022	Brentwood Town		

International career
2018	Tamil Eelam	3	(0)
- * Club domestic league appearances and goals

Jeyasiva Sivapathasundaram (born 23 March 1988) is a Tamil former footballer who last played as a defender for Brentwood Town.

== Early life ==
Siva was born in Denmark.

== Club career ==
In 2010, Siva signed for English side Enfield Town, helping the club achieve promotion. In 2013, he signed for English side Wealdstone, helping the club win the league. In 2020, he signed for English side Canvey Island, where he captained the club and helped them earn promotion.

== International career ==
Siva played for the Tamil Eelam national football team at the CONIFA World Football Cup.

== Style of play ==
Siva mainly operates as a defender and is left-footed.

== Post-playing career ==
Siva has worked as a physical education teacher at All Saints Catholic School & Technology College.

== Awards ==
In 2013, Siva was nominated for an Asian Football Award.

== Personal life ==
Siva has children.
