= FA Sápmi =

Football organization representing the Sámi people

CONIFA
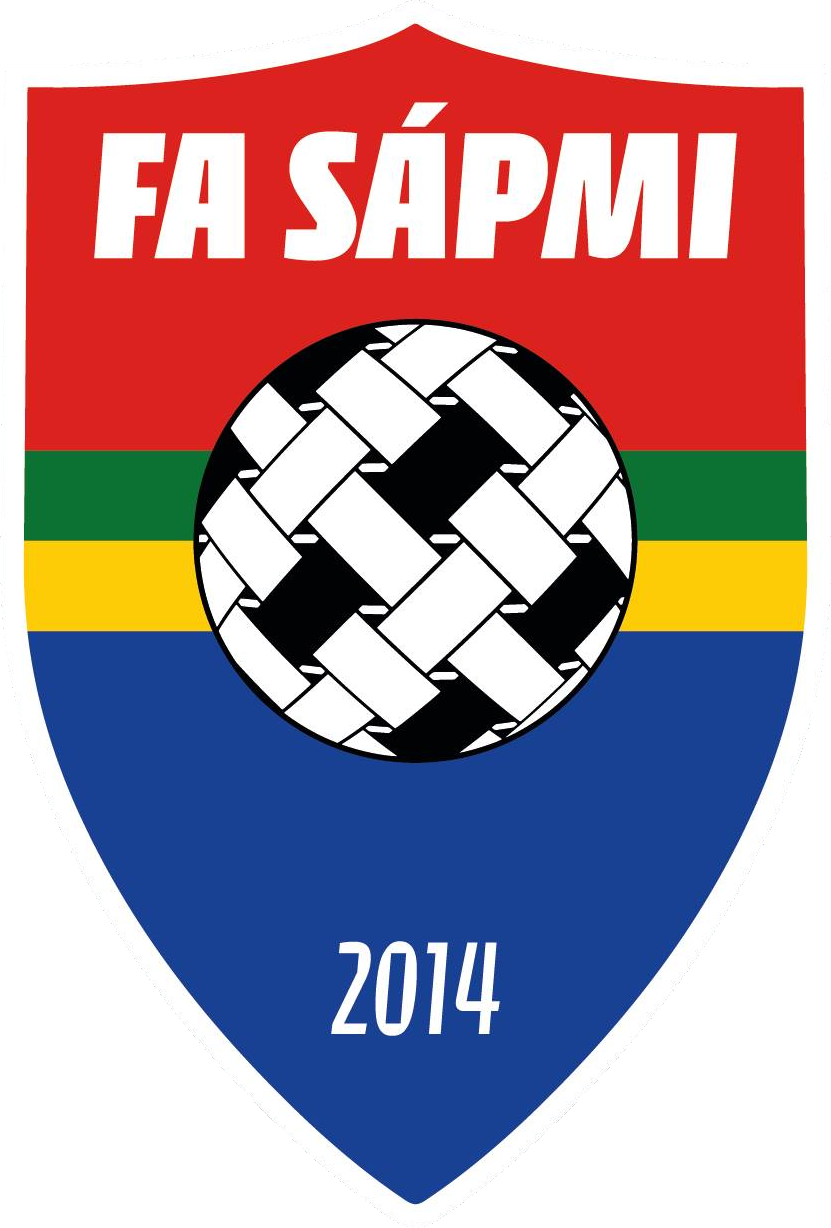
- Founded: March 29, 2014; 11 years ago
- Headquarters: Utsikten 3 Bardufoss, Norway
- CONIFA affiliation: 2014
- President: Håkan Kuorak
- Vice-president: Elin Nicolaisen

FA Sápmi is a football association which is the organizer of the Sápmi football team representing the indigenous Sámi people. It is a member of the Confederation of Independent Football Associations (ConIFA), but not a member of either FIFA or UEFA. The president of the FA Sápmi is Håkan Kuorak from Jokkmokk, Sweden. It was the host of 2014 ConIFA World Football Cup.

FA Sápmi was established in March 2014 as the successor of the 2003 founded Sámi Football Association (Northern Sami: Sámi Spábbáčiekčan Lihttu, SSL; Norwegian: Samisk Fotballforbund, SFF), which had not submitted neither the financial accounts, nor their budget requirement to the Sámi Parliament, and had only existed on paper since 2011, and as a result, its president and vice-president had both resigned in 2012, it had lost the support of the Sámi Parliament in 2013, and finally went bankrupt on 14 January 2015, leaving FA Sápmi as the main football association for the Sámi people.
