= Tamil Eelam national football team =

Football team in Sri Lanka

Tamil Eelam
- Association: Tamileelam Football Association
- Confederation: ConIFA; World Unity Football Alliance
- Head coach: Ragesh Nambiar
- Captain: Prashanth Ragavan
- Most caps: Gvinthan Navaneethakrishnan; Prashanth Ragavan (15)
- Top scorer: Prashanth Ragavan (12)
First colours	Second colours

First international
- Raetia 1–0 Tamil Eelam (Erbil, Iraq; 5 June 2012)

Biggest win
- Tamil Eelam 10–0 Darfur (Östersund, Sweden; 7 June 2014)

Biggest defeat
- Tamil Eelam 0–9 Kurdistan Region (Östersund, Sweden; 3 June 2014)

ConIFA World Football Cup
- Appearances: 2 (first in 2014)
- Best result: 11th (2014)

CONIFA Asian Football Cup
- Appearances: 2 (first in 2023)
- Best result: Champions (2023, 2025)
- Website: Tamileelam Football Association

The Tamil Eelam National Football Team (Tamil: தமிழீழத் தேசிய உதைபந்தாட்ட அணி) is a representative football team for Tamil Eelam, a proposed Breakaway state in Sri Lanka. The team, which mostly consists of players drawn from the Sri Lankan Tamil diaspora community in Canada and Europe, was established in 2012 by the Tamileelam Football Association (TEFA). TEFA is affiliated to the Confederation of Independent Football Associations, an umbrella association for entities unaffiliated with FIFA, and therefore cannot compete in the FIFA World Cup and the AFC Asian Cup since they are not affiliated with the Asian Football Confederation (AFC). As of March 2020, the team was ranked 16th in the CONIFA World ranking.

== History ==
The Tamil Eelam Football Association was established by the Global Tamil Youth League on 8 April 2012. The Tamil Eelam national football team made its international debut at the 2012 VIVA World Cup held in Iraqi Kurdistan, finishing in 7th place. The team took part in the Tynwald Hill International Football Tournament History held on the Isle of Man in July 2013, finishing in 3rd place. The team took part in the 2014 ConIFA World Football Cup held in the Sápmi region.

== Tournament record ==
=== World Cup record ===
Year	Position	P	W	D	L	F	A
VIVA World Cup
(Occitania) 2006	did not enter						
(Sápmi) 2008	did not enter						
(Padania) 2009	did not enter						
(Gozo) 2010	did not enter						
(Kurdistan Region) 2012	7th	4	1	0	3	4	11
ConIFA World Football Cup
(Sápmi) 2014	11th	4	1	0	3	12	15
(Abkhazia) 2016	did not qualify						
(Barawa) 2018	14th	6	1	0	5	4	22
(North Macedonia) 2020	Cancelled						
(Kurdistan Region) 2024	Cancelled						
Total	Best: 7th	14	3	0	11	20	48

World Cup History
Year	Round	Date	Stadium	Score			Result
VIVA World Cup
2012
2012	Round 1 (Group B)	5 June 2012	Franso Hariri Stadium, Erbil	Raetia	1-0	Tamil Eelam	Lose
2012	Round 1 (Group B)	6 June 2012	Franso Hariri Stadium, Erbil	Tamil Eelam	0-3	Zanzibar	Lose
2012	5th-8th Place Semi-Finals	7 June 2012	Franso Hariri Stadium, Erbil	Occitania	7-0	Tamil Eelam	Lose
2012	7th Place Match	9 June 2012	Franso Hariri Stadium, Erbil	Tamil Eelam	4-0	Raetia	Win
ConIFA World Football Cup
2014
2014	Round 1 (Group A)	2 June 2014	Jämtkraft Arena, Östersund	Tamil Eelam	0-2	Arameans Suryoye	Lose
2014	Round 1 (Group A)	3 June 2014	Jämtkraft Arena, Östersund	Tamil Eelam	0-9	Kurdistan Region	Lose
2014	Placement Round 1	5 June 2014	Jämtkraft Arena, Östersund	Tamil Eelam	2-4	Sápmi	Lose
2014	Placement Round 2	7 June 2014	Jämtkraft Arena, Östersund	Tamil Eelam	10-0	Darfur	Win
2018
2018	Round 1 (Group A)	31 May 2018	Hayes Lane, Bromley	Barawa	4-0	Tamil Eelam	Lose
2018	Round 1 (Group A)	2 June 2018	Colston Avenue, Carshalton	Ellan Vannin	2-0	Tamil Eelam	Lose
2018	Round 1 (Group A)	3 June 2018	St Paul's Sports Ground, Rotherhithe	Tamil Eelam	0-6	Cascadia	Lose
2018	Placement Round 9th-16th	5 June 2018	Parkside, Aveley	Abkhazia	6-0	Tamil Eelam	Lose
2018	Placement Round 13th-16th	7 June 2018	Gander Green Lane, Sutton	Tamil Eelam	4-3	Tuvalu	Win
2018	Placement Round 13th-14th	9 June 2018	Parkside, Aveley	Matabeleland	1-0	Tamil Eelam	Lose

=== Asia Cup Record ===
CONIFA Asia Cup
Year	Position	P	W	D	L	F	A
(Portugal) 2023	1st	3	3	0	0	9	2
(England) 2025	1st	3	3	0	0	11	1
Total	Best: 1st	6	6	0	0	20	3

ConIFA Asia Cup
Year	Round	Date	Stadium	Score			Result
2023	Group Stage	5 August 2023	Clube Olimpico Montijo	Tamil Eelam	3-0	Hmong FF	Win
2023	Group Stage	7 August 2023	Clube Olimpico Montijo	Tibet	1-3	Tamil Eelam	Win
2023	Final	9 August 2023	Clube Olimpico Montijo	Tamil Eelam	3-1	Hmong FF	Win
2025	Group Stage	1 July 2025	Elmbridge Sports Hub	Tamil Eelam	4-0	Tibet	Win
2025	Group Stage	2 July 2025	Elmbridge Sports Hub	Tamil Eelam	2-1	East Turkestan	Win
2025	Final	4 July 2025	Elmbridge Sports Hub	Tamil Eelam	5-0	East Turkestan	Win

=== Tynwald Hill International Football Tournament ===
Tynwald Hill International Football Tournament
Year	Position	P	W	D	L	F	A
(Isle of Man) 2013	3rd	3	2	0	1	10	8
Total	Best: 3rd	3	2	0	1	10	8

Tynwald Hill International Football Tournament History
Year	Round	Date	Stadium	Score			Result
2013
2013	Round 1 (Group 1)	4 July 2013	Mullen e Cloie, St John's	Sealand	3 – 5	Tamil Eelam	Win
2013	Round 1 (Group 1)	6 July 2013	Mullen e Cloie, St John's	Occitania	5 – 0	Tamil Eelam	Lose
2013	3rd/4th Place Match	7 July 2013	Mullen e Cloie, St John's	Raetia	0 – 5	Tamil Eelam	Win

== Current squad ==
The following players are members of the current squad. They have played in the recent CONIFA 2020 WFC qualification matches. The CONIFA 2020 World Football Cup has been cancelled due to the unprecedented disruption of the coronavirus pandemic.

No.	Pos.	Player	Date of birth (age)	Caps	Goals	Club
1	GK	Praveen Ahilan	20 September 1992 (aged 27)	2	0	(Canadian Soccer Association) Canada
12	GK	Jerome Marusilin	14 December 1994 (aged 24)	1	0	(French Football Federation) NUSC
13	DF	Ninon Paskarajesudasan	15 September 1993 (aged 26)	3	0	(French Football Federation) France
2	DF	Keerthihan Kalaialagan	13 October 1995 (aged 23)	3	0	(French Football Federation) France
25	DF	Thomas Thevasahayam	9 June 1995 (aged 24)	2	0	(French Football Federation) France
5	DF	Sujeen Ravinchandran	20 August 1993 (aged 26)	2	1	(French Football Federation) FC Bourget
23	DF	Jey Siva	23 March 1988 (aged 31)	3	0	(The Football Association) Harlow Town
22	DF	Majuran Panchalingam	27 January 1987 (aged 32)	1	0	(Swiss Football Association) Switzerland
16	MF	Steven Sacayaradjy	2 February 1995 (aged 24)	3	1	(French Football Federation) France
8	MF	Panushanth Kulenthiran	26 July 1990 (aged 29)	11	8	(Italian Football Federation) AC Senna Gloria
6	MF	Mayooran Chelliah	8 April 1991 (aged 28)	9	1	(French Football Federation) CS Eelavar
17	MF	Senthuran Uthayasuthan	30 September 1992 (aged 27)	3	6	(French Football Federation) France
15	MF	Janothan Perananthan	20 July 1994 (aged 25)	6	1	(The Football Association) Surbiton Sports
21	MF	Shara Sivananthan	17 January 1996 (aged 23)	1	0	(The Football Association) UK
19	MF	Kisanthan Nagarasa	28 December 1998 (aged 20)	1	0	(German Football Association) Germany
10	FW	Gvinthan Navaneethakrishnan	28 March 1990 (aged 29)	15	8	(German Football Association) SV Kickers Büchig
7	FW	Prashanth Ragavan	21 August 1991 (aged 28)	15	12	(French Football Federation) Drancy United
9	FW	Kasthuran Chelliah	9 August 1990 (aged 29)	6	2	(Royal Dutch Football Association) WDS'19
14	FW	Kirushan Confucious	16 June 1995 (aged 24)	2	0	(French Football Federation) France
20	FW	Agash Pathi	25 January 1997 (aged 22)	1	2	(Norwegian Football Federation) Stovner

== See also ==
- Transnational Government of Tamil Eelam
- Tamil Eelam national cricket team
- World Tamil Conference
- World Classical Tamil Conference 2010
