= Sápmi women's national football team =

Organized by FA Sápmi

FA Sápmi
- Association: FA Sápmi
- Confederation: ConIFA
- Head coach: (Norway) Elin Nicolaisen
- Most caps: Caroline Knutsen (4 caps)
- Top scorer: Gry Keskitalo Skulbørstad (9 goals)
First colours

First international
- Åland 2–5 Sápmi (27 June 1991)

Biggest win
- Sápmi 13–1 Tibet (1 july, 2022)

Biggest defeat
- Sápmi 1–8 Umeå IK (30 June 2005)

VIVA Women's World Cup
- Appearances: 1 (first in 2008)
- Best result: Champions (2008)

The Sápmi women's football team is a football team representing the Sámi people, who inhabit northern parts of Norway, Sweden, Finland and Russia. The team is a member of the Confederation of Independent Football Associations. It is organized by FA Sápmi.

The head coach is Elin Nicolaisen (as of 2024).

== History ==
The women's selection becomes champion of the Viva Women's World Cup 2008, winning the first leg and second leg of the final 4-0 and 11-1 (15-1) against the Kurdistan women's football team.

The women's selection becomes champion of the ConIFA Women's Football World Cup 2022, winning the first leg and second leg of the final 13-1 and 9-0 (22-1) against the Tibet women's football team.

== Tournament records ==
=== VIVA Women's World Cup ===
Year	Position	GP	W	D	L	GS	GA
VIVA Women's World Cup
(Sweden) 2008	Champion	2	2	0	0	15	1
(Malta) 2010	Do not participate in the edition						
Total	Best: Champions	2	2	0	0	15	1

=== Women's friendship cup ===
Year	Position	GP	W	D	L	GS	GA
Women's friendship cup
(Northern Cyprus) 2018	Champion	1	1	0	0	4	0
Total	Best: Champions	1	1	0	0	4	0

=== ConIFA Women's Football World Cup ===
Year	Position	GP	W	D	L	GS	GA
ConIFA Women's Football World Cup
(India) 2022	Champion	2	2	0	0	22	1
(Norway) 2024	Champion	5	5	0	0	17	1
Total	Best: Champions	7	7	0	0	39	2

== Selected internationals ==
Date	Venue	Opponent	Score
4 March 1991	Friendly – Norway	Tromsdalen UIL	5–0 [report]
27 June 1991	Friendly – Åland	Åland	5–2 report
11 July 1992	Friendly – Norway	Åland	2–2 report
16 March 2005	Friendly – Norway	IF Fløya	1–6 report
19 March 2005	Friendly – Norway	Asker Fotball	2–2 report
8 June 2005	Friendly – Norway	Åland	5–0 report
30 June 2005	Friendly – Norway	Umeå IK	1–8 report
10 February 2007	Friendly – Norway	Åland	1–1 report
10 July 2008	Viva Women's World Cup – Sweden	Kurdistan Region	4–0 report
13 July 2008	Viva Women's World Cup – Sweden	Kurdistan Region	11–1 report
14 July 2011	Friendly – Sweden	Infjärdens SK	4–1 report
16 July 2011	Friendly – Sweden	Piteå IF	1–6 report
17 July 2011	Friendly – Sweden	Alviks IK	1–5 report
10 November 2018	Women's friendship cup – Northern Cyprus	Northern Cyprus	4–0 report
2018	Friendly – Sweden	Occitania	Canceled
1 July 2022	ConIFA Women's Football World Cup – India	Tibet	13–1 report
3 July 2022	ConIFA Women's Football World Cup – India	Tibet	9–0 report
4 June 2024	ConIFA Women's Football World Cup – Norway	Székely Land	2-0 report
5 June 2024	ConIFA Women's Football World Cup – Norway	Tamil Eelam	2–0
6 June 2024	ConIFA Women's Football World Cup – Norway	Székely Land	3–0
6 June 2024	ConIFA Women's Football World Cup – Norway	Tamil Eelam	8–0
8 June 2024	ConIFA Women's Football World Cup – Norway	Tamil Eelam	2–1

== Head-to-head records against other countries ==
Opponent	Pld	W	D	L	GF	GA
Åland	4	2	2	0	13	5
Tibet	2	2	0	0	22	1
Kurdistan Region	2	2	0	0	15	1
Northern Cyprus	1	1	0	0	4	0
IF Fløya	1	0	0	1	1	6
Tromsdalen UIL	1	1	0	0	5	0
Asker Fotball	1	0	1	0	2	2
Umeå IK	1	0	0	1	1	8
Infjärdens SK	1	1	0	0	4	1
Piteå IF	1	0	0	1	1	6
Alviks IK	1	0	0	1	1	5
Total	16	9	3	4	69	35

== Players ==
The following 20 players were called up for the 2024 CONIFA Women's World Football Cup, to be played from 4 to 8 June.

No.	Pos.	Player	Date of birth (age)	Caps	Goals	Club
20	GK	Marja Sofe Holmestrand Hætta	7 February 1995 (age 30)	2		(Norwegian Football Federation) Våg FK
5	DF	Tonje Nilssen	23 January 1993 (age 32)	2		(Norwegian Football Federation) IL Polarstjernen
		Ida Øyen				(Norwegian Football Federation) BOIF
	DF	Lina Ullen				(United States Soccer Federation) Gardner–Webb Runnin' Bulldogs
7	MF	Laila Katrine Triumf	26 May 2005 (age 20)	2		(Norwegian Football Federation) Porsanger IL
17	MF	Tuva Prestbakmo Jinnengren		1		(Norwegian Football Federation) BOIF
4		Jenny Marie Mannsverk		2		(Norwegian Football Federation) Våg FK
3	MF	Sofie Sørensen	14 April 1999 (age 26)	1		(Norwegian Football Federation) Medkila IL
10	FW	Wilma Ritzen	23 October 2001 (age 24)	2	2	(United States Soccer Federation) Palm Beach Atlantic Sailfish
11	MF	Frida Ritzen		2		(Swedish Football Association) BK Kenty
18	MF	Klara Norlemann	1 January 2005 (age 21)	2	1	(Norwegian Football Federation) KFUM
13	MF	Karoline Fosli		2	1	(Norwegian Football Federation) BOIF
	MF	Tuva Solstad	25 October 2006 (age 19)			(Norwegian Football Federation) IF Fløya
9	MF	Ylva Johnsen	30 July 2007 (age 18)	1		(Norwegian Football Federation) TIL 2020
	MF	Thea Andreassen Isaksen	27 May 2007 (age 18)			(Norwegian Football Federation) Medkila IL
8		Thea Norkyn Nygård		1		(Norwegian Football Federation) IK Grand Bodø
16		Eva-Alida Eliasson		1		(Swedish Football Association) Umeå IK
2		Hilda Sundqvist		1		
		Sofie Engseth				(Norwegian Football Federation) BOIF

== Best goal scorers ==
9 goals
Gry Keskitalo Skulbørstad
3 goals
Reidun Nilsen
2 goals
Mia Caraina Eira
1 goal
Andrea Madsen
Ann-Iren Trosten
Marlene Hallen
Magdalena Esseryd
Mia Oscarsson
Ragnhild Fosshaug
Anna Pekari
Therese Berg
Johanne Bjørnå
Marie Kristine Haugsnes
Anne Berit Holmestrand
Sigrun Linaker Dybek
Emilia Kristensen
Sandra Simonsen
Kristina Elsie Blind

== Managers ==
Manager	Period	Played	Won	Drawn	Lost	Win %
(Norway)	1991-1992	3	2	1	0	66.66
(Norway) Isak Ole Hætta	2005-2007	5	1	2	2	20
(Norway) Frank Steve Lindseth	2008	2	2	0	0	100
(Norway) Liv Eli Holmestrand	2011	3	1	0	2	33.33
(Norway) Elin Nicolaisen	2018–	3	3	0	0	100
Totals		16	9	3	4	56.25
