= Non-FIFA international football =

Association football played outside the purview of FIFA

Non-FIFA international football is the segment of international football that is not overseen by FIFA. FIFA is the international governing body of association football, overseeing football globally and with running international representative matches. However, some international football takes place outside its authority. This often consists of matches involving sub-national entities such as islands, colonies, or autonomous regions. Representative matches also occur involving states with limited international recognition who are unable to qualify for FIFA membership. There are also a limited number of states whose representative teams are not affiliated to FIFA. Historically, a number of competitions occurred outside FIFA's auspices. Member associations are national associations, usually affiliated to continental confederations which are subordinate to FIFA.

== National teams ==
Broadly speaking, non-FIFA national teams can be categorised as one of the following:

=== States ===
Teams representing eight small sovereign states – the Federated States of Micronesia, Kiribati, Monaco, Nauru, Palau, Tuvalu, Marshall Islands, and the Vatican City – have played international football but are not affiliated to FIFA. Two of those states – Kiribati and Tuvalu – are Associate Members of Oceania Football Confederation, but not its parent organisation.

The United Kingdom is represented in FIFA through its four constituent countries (England, Wales, Scotland, and Northern Ireland). During the 1940s and 1950s, a United Kingdom national football team was assembled on a few occasions to play friendly matches: these are not considered full internationals by FIFA.

=== Autonomous (or autonomy-seeking) regions and unrecognised states ===
A second category encompasses regions of larger nations which have a history of autonomy. They may have already achieved a degree of self-governance (for example the autonomous communities of Spain including Catalonia, Galicia, and the Basque Country which usually play just one game a year, traditionally at Christmas), or be seeking it (like for example the French region of Brittany). However, it is necessary to distinguish the Basque team from the others, as it has come to represent not just the Basque autonomous community of Spain, but the greater Basque region, also incorporating Navarre and the French Basque Country. The Republic of Srpska as a state entity with a high degree of autonomy, has ever since it was established in 1992 had its own football federation and national teams Republika Srpska national football team who play friendly matches. The Dayton Peace Treaty recognizes it as a constitutive part of Bosnia and Herzegovina, and in 2002 both FIFA and UEFA accepted FA Republic of Srpska as one of two cofounders of FA BIH.

Alternatively, some unrecognised states may have national teams. Some established members of FIFA still fall into this category, such as Chinese Taipei. Current non-FIFA heavyweights Northern Cyprus are the best example of this category of non-FIFA football team.

=== Regional associations ===
Several teams which represent the regional associations of established footballing nations. These oversee local football in their respective regions and are part of a network of associations that contribute to the national association as a whole. A good example of this would be Jersey, who hold county status within the Football Association. These regional associations often enter representative teams into international non-FIFA matches.

=== Stateless people ===
Another group of teams are representative sides of ethnic groups that are without a home state, or are drawn from an ethnic diaspora. The Sami people of Lapland live in a distinct area of northern Fennoscandia, yet fall under the control of four states. Nevertheless, they have organised a football association and a representative team. Similarly, the Romani people—having been strewn across Europe for centuries—have a fledgeling footballing organisation to represent them in international competition. Other people who were stateless, such as the Palestinians have been welcomed into FIFA and despite their state, Asian Football Confederation (AFC) only more recently recognised them in international football. The Esperanto football team represents the worldwide community of Esperanto speakers.

== Organizations ==
=== International ===
- CONIFA – Confederation of Independent Football Associations: from confederation's homepage: CONIFA aims to build bridges between people, nations, minorities and isolated regions all over the world through friendship, culture and the joy of playing football. CONIFA works for the development of affiliated members and is committed to fair play and the eradication of racism. As of August 2025, CONIFA has 42 member associations.
- IIGA – International Island Games Association: formed in 1985, this is an organization with the sole purpose to organise the Island Games, a friendly biennial athletic competition (including football) between teams from several islands and other small territories. As of September 2025, IIGA has 24 members.

==== Defunct / Inactive ====
- UIAFA - Union Internationale Amateur de Football Association - three, later seven members - founded in 1908 and dissolved in 1912. Main tournament was the Amateur European Championship, this confederation was the rival to FIFA in the early years.
- FIFI - Federation of International Football Independents - five members - represented nations, dependencies and unrecognized states not affiliated to FIFA. The main tournament was the FIFI Wild Cup.
- IFU – International Football Union: a now-defunct and short-lived football association established in 2009 and dissolved in 2010. It was located in Guimarães (Portugal) and was made up of teams that represent nations that were not recognized as sovereign states and which are therefore not eligible to become members of FIFA. Members of this organization were Greenland and Zanzibar.
- N.F.-Board: is a football federation established in 2003. It is made up of teams that represented nations that were not recognized as sovereign states and which were therefore not eligible to become members of FIFA, football's world governing body. The NF-Board organised the VIVA World Cup between 2006 and 2012 and the UNPO Cup. As of 2025, it repeatedly has had its attempts shot down, thus for most the organisation is inactive. Despite this, it is not dissolved.
- WUFA – World Unity Football Alliance: from alliance's homepage: The World Unity Football Alliance is a collaborative effort between value-aligned teams with a mission to promote hope, opportunity, and universal human rights while celebrating the joy of bringing people together through the most beautiful of games: Football. Our united core values include empathy, compassion, equity, honesty, and respect for universal human rights. We work equitably together on projects, campaigns, and events that elevate the Alliance's mission and values, and those of each of our teams. As of 2021, WUFA has 19 member associations. However, its website became defunct in 2023.

=== Continent-restricted ===
- COSANFF – El Consejo Sudamericano de Nuevas Federaciones de Fútbol: The main South American non-FIFA organisation. As of August 2025, there are 11 member associations.

==== Defunct/inactive ====
- CENF - Confederation of European New Federations - unknown number of members (Note: Due to link rot and the inability to save outlinks up to 2017, it is unknown how many members the CENF had.) - founded in 2007 and dissolved in 2009, represented teams not affiliated to FIFA in Europe, and was affiliated to NF-Board. The main tournament was the CENF Cup, but is unknown to have been played.

== Non-FIFA competitions ==
Football tournaments at international multi-sports events, such as the Olympics, Pan-American Games and Francophone games are without FIFA's jurisdiction, but are, for the most part, operated with the acknowledgement of that body. These events typically involve age restricted teams, to avoid direct competition with the World Cup and continental championships.

=== Men's tournaments ===
==== International ====
===== The UNPO Cup =====
The UNPO Cup was organised by the Unrepresented Nations and Peoples Organization and NF-Board, and took place in The Hague in June 2005. The tournament, which coincided with UNPO's 7th General Assembly, featured four teams. The South Moluccas won the cup, beating Chechnya in the final. A second UNPO football cup took place in June 2017, with the Chameria team winning the tournament.

Host nation	Year	Winners
Netherlands	2005	South Moluccas
Netherlands	2017	Chameria

===== ConIFA World Football Cup =====
Host nation	Year	Winners
Sápmi	2014	County of Nice
Abkhazia	2016	Abkhazia
Barawa	2018	Kárpátalja
North Macedonia (Note: No official host team after Somaliland withdrew from hosting the tournament.)	2020	N/A †
Iraqi Kurdistan	2024	N/A ‡

† 2020 CONIFA World Football Cup cancelled due to COVID-19 Pandemic. ‡ 2024 CONIFA World Football Cup postponed, later cancelled, due to security concerns.

===== Football at the Island Games =====
The Island Games, which are held every two years, features a competitive football tournament, won on the first two occasions by now-established UEFA and FIFA member, the Faroe Islands, and again in 2007 by now UEFA members, Gibraltar. Many of the competing nations are affiliated to larger national FAs – the Jersey Football Association, for example, is governed by the FA.

Host	Year	Winners
Faroe Islands	1989	Faroe Islands
Åland	1991	Faroe Islands
Isle of Wight	1993	Jersey
Gibraltar	1995	Isle of Wight
Jersey	1997	Jersey
Gotland	1999	Ynys Môn
Isle of Man	2001	Guernsey
Guernsey	2003	Guernsey
Shetland	2005	Shetland
Rhodes	2007	Gibraltar
Åland	2009	Jersey
Isle of Wight	2011	Isle of Wight
Bermuda	2013	Bermuda
Jersey	2015	Guernsey
Gotland	2017	Isle of Man
Gibraltar	2019	N/A †
Guernsey	2021	N/A ‡
Guernsey	2023	Jersey
Orkney	2025	Bermuda
Faroe Islands	2027	
Isle of Man	2029	

† Ynys Mon hosted an unofficial 2019 Inter Games Football Tournament as Gibraltar did not have enough pitches. Ynys Mon won the men's tournament and Isle of Man won the women's.
‡ 2021 Island Games postponed until 2023 due to COVID-19 with all previously announced host moved back 2 years.

==== Continental ====
===== CONIFA European Football Cup =====
The CONIFA European Football Cup was originally announced to be held in Douglas, the Isle of Man, but this was later changed to include games in Farnborough and Woking, England. However, it was later moved entirely to Székely Land, Romania. The tournament took place from 13 to 21 June 2015. It was the first ever European Championship between representative teams outside FIFA. The 12 representative teams: Ellan Vannin, County of Nice, Abkhazia, Nagorno Karabakh, South Ossetia, Occitania, Romani People, Franconia, Sapmi, Northern Cyprus, Szekely Land and Padania. Subsequently, 3 teams (Franconia, Monaco, Nagorno-Karabakh) cancelled their participation for the 2015 CONIFA European Football Cup in Hungary, which forced the originally planned schedule to be revised. The presence of a total of nine teams led to three groups of three being formed. In May 2015, Occitania also announced their withdrawal from the competition, which led to another revision of the match schedule into two groups of four, which CONIFA based upon their ranking points system. In June 2015, another three teams, South Ossetia, Abkhazia and Northern Cyprus, were all forced to withdraw, as a result of visa difficulties, while the Felvidek team was added to the line up – leaving two groups of three and six participants in total.

Host nation	Year	Winners
Székely Land	2015	Padania
Northern Cyprus	2017	Padania
Artsakh	2019	South Ossetia
County of Nice	2021	N/A†
Northern Cyprus	2023	N/A‡
Padania	2026	Northern Cyprus

† 2021 CONIFA European Football Cup cancelled due to COVID-19 Pandemic.
‡ 2023 CONIFA European Football Cup cancelled due to 2023 Turkey–Syria earthquake

===== The Europeada =====
The Europeada is a football tournament for indigenous and national minorities in Europe, and is organized by the Federal Union of European Nationalities. The first edition was played in 2008 in Surselva, Switzerland.

Host nation	Year	Winners
Switzerland	2008	South Tyrol
Germany	2012	South Tyrol
Italy	2016	South Tyrol
Austria	2022	South Tyrol
Denmark/Germany	2024	Friûl
Italy	2028	

===== CONIFA Asian Football Cup =====
The CONIFA Asian Football Cup is a cup played by the CONIFA members in Asia. The first cup was played in Alcochete, Portugal. The second cup was played in London, England. Tamil Eelam won both tournaments.

Host nation	Year	Winners
Portugal	2023	Tamil Eelam
United Kingdom	2025	Tamil Eelam

===== Copa CSANF =====
The Copa CSANF is a football tournament for football federations not admitted to FIFA in South America. Is organized by the CSANF – Consejo Sudamericano de Nuevas Federaciones. The first edition was played in 2011 in Chile.

Host nation	Year	Winners
Juan Fernández Islands	2011	Juan Fernández Islands
Argentina	2014	Armenian Argentine Community

The CSANF 10th Anniversary Cup is the third tournament which celebrates the 10 years of the creation of the CSANF.

Host nation	Year	Winners
Argentina	2017	Armenian Argentine Community

===== Copa ANPO =====
The Campeonato Nacional de Futbol Pueblos Originarios (Copa ANPO) is a football tournament for the indigenous peoples of South America, and is organized by the Asociación Nacional de Pueblos Originarios. The inaugural tournament was played in 2012 in Chile. Campeonato de futbol Pueblos Originarios Asociacion Andina de Futbol Liga Andina Arica Facebook page on Facebook played among six teams. Three teams come from the Mapuche people – the largest indigenous population in Chile. There is a Mapuche team, a Pewenche team (which is the term used for Mapuche populations living in the mountainous regions of Chile), and a Warriache team (composed of Mapuche individuals from the city). In addition, there is one Aymara team, one Lican Antay (or Atacameño) team, and one Rapa Nui team.

The N.F.-Board's South American governing body CONMEBOLNFIFA have announced a preliminary date for the second Indigenous Peoples' Championship. Set for Santiago in Chile from August 5–10, 2013, the sides hoped to compete are Easter Island, Mapuche, Aymara, LikanAntay, Diaguita, Kolla, Quechua and a combined Yaghan-Kawesqar team.

Host nation	Year	Winners
Chile	2012	Easter Island
Chile	2013	Huilliche
Chile	2015	Mapuche

===== CONIFA South America Football Cup =====
The CONIFA South America Football Cup is a tournament organized by CONIFA. It is attended by CONIFA members of South America. The first and only cup that has been played was held in Estadio Fiscal de Linares in Linares, Chile. Maule Sur won.

Host nation	Year	Winners
Chile	2022	Maule Sur

===== CONIFA African Football Cup =====
The CONIFA African Football Cup is a tournament organized by CONIFA and played by CONIFA members of South America. A tournament was planned in 2021 but was cancelled due to unknown reasons. A second tournament was played in 2022 with 3 teams. Biafra won the tournament.

Host nation	Year	Winners
Zanzibar	2021	Cancelled
South Africa	2022	Biafra

==== Defunct and one-off competitions ====
===== 1911 UIAFA European Football Tournament =====
The UIAFA European Football Tournament, also known as the Great European Football Tournament, was the only tournament held by the UIAFA, which was a competitor to FIFA in its early years. Out of UIAFA's 7 members, only four participated.

Host nation	Year	Winners
France	1911	Bohemia

===== FIFI Wild Cup (2006) =====
The FIFI Wild Cup was organised by the German football club St. Pauli in the summer of 2006. It took place while the FIFA World Cup was being played in Germany, and aimed to raise awareness of stateless nations. Five nations took part, along with a team representing the St. Pauli district of Hamburg. Northern Cyprus beat Zanzibar 4–1 on penalties to win the tournament.

Host nation	Year	Winners
Germany	2006	Northern Cyprus

===== The ELF Cup (2006) =====
The ELF Cup, organised by the KTFF, took place in November 2006, in Northern Cyprus. Eight teams accepted invitations to take part, and the hosts emerged as winners.

Host nation	Year	Winners
Northern Cyprus	2006	Northern Cyprus

===== VIVA World Cup (2006–2012) =====
The first VIVA World Cup, organised by the N.F.-Board, took place in Occitania in November 2006. Six nations initially accepted invitations, but eventually, only 3 took part, the hosts, Monaco and Saami, the eventual winners. The second edition took place in Lapland in 2008 and Padania emerged as winners, as the third in 2009 where Padania won the tournament at home.

Host nation	Year	Winners
Occitania	2006	Sápmi
Sápmi	2008	Padania
Padania	2009	Padania
Gozo	2010	Padania
Iraqi Kurdistan	2012	Kurdistan Region

=== Women Tournaments ===
Across a discreet number of minor tournaments, the only three main international football tournaments for women are the Women's VIVA World Cup, the Europeada and the Island Games.

==== Island Games ====
A women's football tournament at the Island Games has been played since the 2001 edition:

Host nation	Year	Winners
Isle of Man	2001	Faroe Islands
Guernsey	2003	Faroe Islands
Shetland	2005	Faroe Islands
Rhodes	2007	Åland
Åland	2009	Åland
Isle of Wight	2011	Åland
Bermuda	2013	Bermuda
Jersey	2015	Jersey
Gotland	2017	Gotland
Gibraltar	2019	N/A †
Guernsey	2021	N/A ‡
Guernsey	2023	Bermuda
Orkney	2025	Bermuda
Faroe Islands	2027	
Isle of Man	2029	

† Ynys Mon hosted an unofficial 2019 Inter Games Football Tournament as Gibraltar did not have enough pitches.
‡ 2021 Island Games postponed until 2023 due to COVID-19 with all previously announced host moved back 2 years.

==== CONIFA Women's World Football Cup ====
A women's football tournament at the CONIFA World Football Cup has been played since 2022.

Host nation	Year	Winners
Tibet	2022	Sápmi
Sápmi	2024	Sápmi

==== The Europeada ====
A women's football tournament at the Europeada has been played since the 2016 edition:

Host nation	Year	Winners
Italy	2016	South Tyrol
Austria	2022	Carinthian Slovenes
Denmark/Germany	2024	South Tyrol

==== Defunct competitions ====
===== VIVA World Cup (2008–2010) =====
A women's football tournament, the VIVA World Cup, was played from 2008 until 2010:

Host nation	Year	Winners
Sápmi	2008	Sápmi
Gozo	2010	Padania

Two other tournaments in 2013 and 2018 were planned, but cancelled.

== Top level football leagues for Non FIFA club teams ==
Here are some examples:

Location	League	Narrative
Falkland Islands	Falkland Islands Football League	The football association of the Falkland Islands is not a member of FIFA or UEFA or CONMEBOL.
Mayotte	Mayotte Division Honneur	The football association of Mayotte is simply associated with the French Football Federation.
Saint Pierre and Miquelon	Ligue de Football de Saint Pierre et Miquelon	The football association of Saint Pierre and Miquelon is simply associated with the French Football Federation.
Gozo	Gozo Football League First Division	The football association of Gozo is not a member of FIFA or UEFA.
Greenland	Greenlandic Football Championship	played between club teams, is the premier football competition in Greenland. The Football Association of Greenland is not a member of FIFA or CONCACAF or UEFA.
Kiribati	Kiribati National Championship	The football association of Kiribati is an associate member of OFC.
Monaco	Challenge Prince Rainier III	The football association of Monaco is not a member of FIFA or UEFA.
Northern Cyprus	KTFF Süper Lig	The football association of Northern Cyprus is not a member of FIFA or UEFA.
Tuvalu	Tuvalu A-Division	The football association of Tuvalu is an associate member of OFC.
Vatican	Vatican City Championship	The football association of Vatican City is not a member of FIFA or UEFA.
Zanzibar	Zanzibar Premier League	The football association of Zanzibar is an associate member of CAF.

== International competition for clubs ==
Here are some examples:

- Upton Park Trophy
- Coupe D.O.M.
- Ligue des Antilles

== Other tournaments ==
- The Coupe de l'Outre-Mer is organised by the FFF, took place in October 2008, in Paris, France. Teams representing the eleven French Overseas Territories are allowed to participate. The first edition was won by Réunion. After 3 editions the Coupe de l'Outre-Mer, for French overseas territories, has been cancelled by the French Football Federation.
- KTFF 50th Anniversary Cup was held in 2005 under the auspices of the NF-Board, this tournament celebrated 50 years of the football association of Northern Cyprus, the KTFF, and featured representative sides from the host nation, the Sápmi, and Kosovo. Northern Cyprus triumphed in a round-robin tournament.
- Inter Island Cup played between Cocos Islands and Christmas Island in 1994, 1997, 1999, 2004 and 2005.
- Micronesia Games played by Northern Mariana Islands, Guam, Palau, Yap and Pohnpei in 1998.
- Adam Shield played between the Faroe Islands and Shetland, from 1935 to 1967.
- Micronesian Cup played between Micronesia and Northern Marianas Islands in 1999.
- Pasefika Cup played by teams composed of ethnic groups in the Pacific Ocean, is played since 2008.
- Marianas Cup played between Guam and Northern Marianas Islands from 2007.
- Clericus Cup played between sixteen Roman colleges and seminaries of the Catholic Church since 2007. Is a tournament with team from Worldwide. In 2010 most of the athletes coming from Brazil, Colombia, Italy, Mexico, and the United States of America.
- Virgin Islands Championship played between islands of Virgin archipelago from 1997 to 2003.
- Inter Islands Competition played between Saba and Sint Eustatius in 2004 and 2006.
- Windward Islands Tournament played between St.Lucia, Grenada, Dominica and St.Vincent in 2001.
- Leeward Islands Tournament played between Caribbean islands from 1949 to 2002.
- Muratti Vase played between Guernsey, Alderney and Jersey since 1905.
- GFA Tournament played in Gibraltar, with the host, Isle of Man and Isle of Wight in 2004.
- Tournoi des Iles played in Brittany, with the host, Guadeloupe, Martinique and French Guiana in 2003.
- Greenland Cup played between Greenland, Faroe Islands and Iceland from 1980 to 1984.
- North Atlantic Cup played between Orkney, Faroe Islands and Shetland from 1968 to 1973.
- Milne Cup annual tournament between Orkney and Shetland, played since 1919.
- Martinez Shield played between Trinidad Island, Barbados and Demerara (British Guyana), from 1923 to 1933.
- Somaliland Regional Games played between Regions of Somaliland since 2011.
- Tournoi Frantz Fanon between Martinique, Guadeloupe and Haiti, played in 2002.
- Tournoi du Cinquantenaire played between French Guiana, Martinique and Guadeloupe, in 2003.
- The Four Nations played by England, Scotland and Wales with "B" teams and Gibraltar in 2008.
- Tournoi de Guadeloupe played between Guadeloupe and St.Lucia in 2006.
- Jeux Inter-Iles played between Wallis Island and Futuna Island in 2001.
- Chinese Championship played between Chinese regions, from 1973 to 1989.
- Chinese National Games played between Chinese regions, from 1959 to 1965.
- Santosh Trophy played between Indian States, since 1973.
- DONER Trophy played between the Indian States, in 2003 and 2004.
- The Southwest Cup is an open soccer tournament to Native American tribal teams in the Southwest United States. This tournament is biennial and started in 1957.
- South-West Counties Championship played between Cornwall, Guernsey and Jersey, and several other English counties from 1998 to 2007.
- Alex Oni Cup played between Igbo Nation, Edo Nation and Yoruba Nation, from 1950 to 1957.
- Brazilian State Championship played by Brazilian states from 1922 to 1987.
- Brazilian Native Peoples Games are held under the auspices of FUNAI.
- International Small Nations Tournament played by Jersey, Gibraltar and Madeira (U-20 team) in Jersey in 2008.
- 2010 Corsica Football Cup – played 4 teams: 2 non-FIFA and 2 FIFA.
- The Eco-Sys Action Cup (EAFC) – playing for the planet.
- The International tournament of peoples and cultures in Marseille (France) from 23 to 28 June 2013. International Soccer Tournament is part of Marseille European City of Culture 2013. 6–12 Men's senior teams will vie for honours while sharing a cultural experience with their opponents.
- Tynwald Hill International Football Tournament The first Tynwald Hill International Football Tournament to be held at Mullen e Cloie, St Johns, Isle of Man from the 4 to 7 July 2013. Competing Teams – Sealand, Alderney, Tamil Eelam, Raetia, Occitania and St Johns United.
- 1st Copa America for Pueblos Originarios will be held in Colombia in 2014.
- All Hazara tournament played between Hazara nation in Pakistan.
- The Cup of the SADR (Sahrawi Arab Democratic Republic) – a new edition of the Saharawi Soccer Cup with players who live in forced exile in Spain and in France participate.
- 2016 World Unity Cup a 3-team invitational football tournament involving Barawa, Chagos Islands and Tamil Eelam national football team, Darfur were announced to participate but later withdrew.
- Southern Frontier Cup a 4-team invitational tournament hosted by International Surrey Football, in Surrey, United Kingdom.
- WUFA World Series, organised by the World Unity Football Alliance, first stage held in Surrey, United Kingdom, with subsequent stages planned.

Some non-FIFA teams play in other tournaments generally played by FIFA members, including the CONCACAF Gold Cup, Indian Ocean Games, CECAFA Cup, South Pacific Games, Coupes des Caraibes, Shell Caribbean Cup, CFU Championship and many more.

Moreover, many teams, before obtaining FIFA membership, played friendlies and international tournaments – for example, the Faroe Islands.

=== Youth Tournaments ===
A big number of friendlies are being played between youth selections with different restrictions (U-21, U-18, or U-16 for example) but still no international or continental tournaments are being held. Only a small number of minor tournaments are played for youth selections: one of them, and probably one of the most important, is Muratti Vase, which is played for U-21, U-18, U-15.

=== Club Tournaments ===
Despite the fact that many non-FIFA associations have their own league, there are no international or continental club tournaments.

== See also ==
- List of men's national association football teams
- UEFA Regions' Cup
