= Tibet women's national football team =

Women's national association football team representing Tibet

- Nickname: "Lionesses Snow"
- Association: Tibetan Women's Soccer
- Confederation: ConIFA
- Head coach: Gompo Dorjee
- Most caps: Jamyang Choetso
- Top scorer: Jamyang Choetso
First colours	Second colours

First international
- Himachal Pradesh 0–2 Tibet (India; 26 May 2012)

Biggest win
- Tibet 8–0 Kendriya Vidyalaya School (India; 28 April 2016)

Biggest defeat
- Manipur 7–0 Tibet (India; 14 February 2014)

The Tibet women's football team is a national association football team controlled by the Tibet Women's Soccer (TWS), an organization of exiled Tibetans. Its current team manager is Gompo Dorjee.

== Story ==
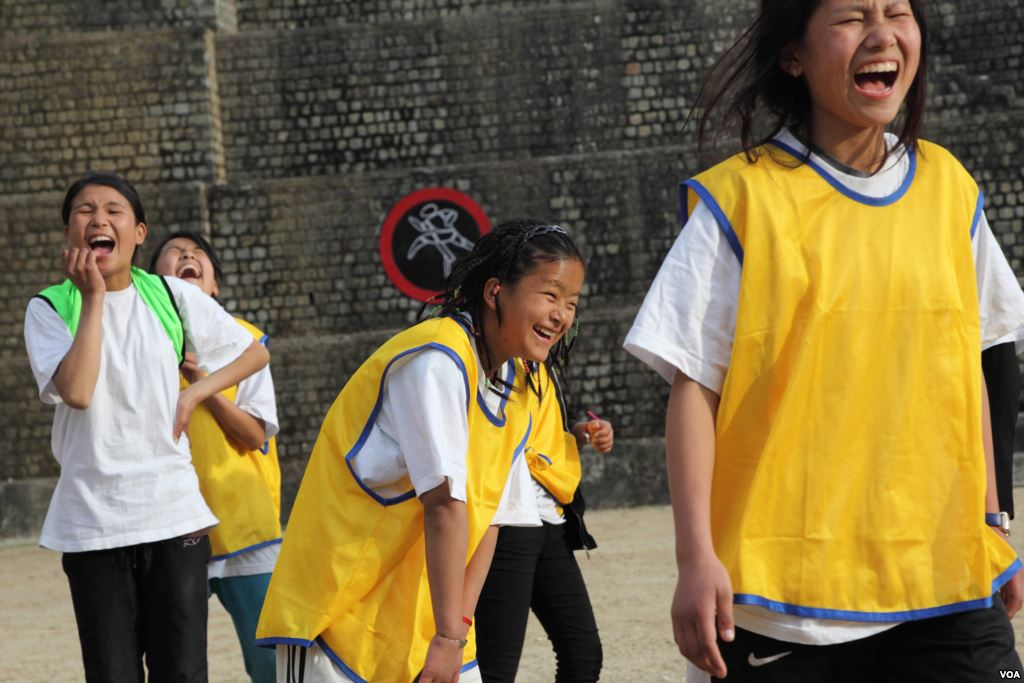
The first Women's Football Team Tibet founded April 27, 2012 in Dharamsala

In 2010, Tibetan schools in India launched for the first time an official football program for Tibetan to Dharamshala.

The US Cassie Childers, during his summer break trip to Dharamsala in India. During the 2010 FIFA World Cup, she noticed that she was the only woman to pay attention to this international event. Subsequently, at a photographic exhibition of the National Association of Tibetan sports, she is surprised that there are no women featured in the photographs, it was not just football, but all the sports. Cassie Childers participant in driving the Tibetan youth and became the first coach of the Women's Football Team Tibet.

During the winter holidays, forty girls selected by their schools, have lived together for learning and practicing football and name the potential team captains, while participating in leadership training. For the first training games, they are divided into two teams, The Princesses Himalayan and Snowland United .

In 2011, the is headed by National Association of Tibetan soccer and National Association of Tibetan sports, help the teacher Willits Charter. The program was founded in October 2011 to serve as a tool to empower Tibetan women in the refugee community. Thirteen Tibetan schools in India and eighteen people were trained to best frame the 500 adolescents participating in the program. The program begins in a training camp for a month, the 18 trainers form girls from each participating school to become leaders of the future new teams in both football training and empowerment. During this period the camp invite professional coaches, sports psychologists, empower women teachers, physiotherapists, nurses and specialized sports coaches. Eventually the female sports program of Tibet has trained 13 clubs in refugee settlements located in India.

A few days after the end of the 2011 FIFA Women's World Cup, 5 July, a team of seven Tibetan players met a Chinese team during the Discover Football Festival in Berlin. Phuntsok Dolma, Sherab Dolma, Yandan Lhamo, Tenzin Norzom, Dasel Tenzin Sonam Tenzin Yangzom Palyang and then became the first Tibetan players to play a historic meeting in a foreign country. The players were selected in a refugee camp in India by their coaches, Gompo Dorjee and Cassie Childers, for the simple reason that in China, they would never have had the right to set foot on a ball. They confronted the players of the Shanghai University of Sport. Some months before, Cassie Childers, the program manager and founder of the Football Association Women's Tibet, had decided with the team of a collaboration with the national Association of Tibetan sports.

The team of Tibetan women's football, created in 2011 in Dharamsala, India, was released thanks to international donations. The first Tibetan Women's National Team is created, composed of 21 members. The first captain Ngawang Tsering Lhamo and Lhadon is the vice captain of the team. The selection of the team of girls of the Tibetan football is chosen each winter in a training camp.

In 2012 May 26, Tibet faces Himachal Pradesh team before formatnum 8000 spectators, the match will end with a victory of two goals to nil, the first goal in the history of the women's team is Lhamo Kyi registered. On September 9, the team played a second match which will result in a loss to Haryana.

In 2013 the team wins a match, the second ended in defeat, the latest in a draw.

In 2014 the team participates in Manipur Spring Football Festival first ladies Imphal. The first match starts on February 14 is finally defeated, the day the game is winning 4–2, is allowing Tibet to play the final against Manipur who finished in a draw, the two teams are named co-winner the tournament.

For the training session at Winter Camp 2014, a professional team is in place to form the best women's team Tibet. Cassie Childers, General Manager & Responsible (communication, teamwork, leadership, self-esteem). Shane Kidby of New Zealand served as head coach. Johanna Kidby, New Zealand also joined as a fitness coach (yoga, circuit training, meditation, nutrition). James Ryle of Ireland has used his training in hypnotherapy and other therapeutic models for group sessions and individual sports therapy. Ngawang Namdol Coordinator with the TNSA.

In 2015, they participate in three friendly matches that end in four wins, a draw is a defeat. Summer Camp 2015 begins with a new coach of the female Tibetan football team Gompo Dorjee, and the creation of a new headquarters in Clement Town India.

In 2016, the 28 and 30 April, two preparation matches are played, overwhelming victory against K.V School eight goals to nil and Woodstock School six goal to zero.

Goa Football Association (GFA) has introduced the female Goa Football Festival, the tournament starts on 4 for Tibet May 5 at Duler Stadium Mapusa. Participating teams are the Tibet team Football Academy Spectrum Viva Goa and North Goa XI. The Tibetan team players compose the Tibetan refugee community in India and Nepal.

Jamyang Choetso (Wangla), the tournament is designated team captain, Tenzin Dekyong is chosen as goalkeeper of the Tibet team. For the first time, the team selected a contingent of six players from the Nepal. The team is coached by Gompo Dorjee, a former member of the National Men's Team Tibet, and managed by Cassie Childers.

In his first match Tibet's team wins against North Viva Goa 4–0 football stadium Duler. Goals are marked by Jamyang Choetso the 6th and 33rd minutes, Ngawang Lhamo Dhondup Otsoe 11th and 40th.

The women's Tibetan team plays against Goa XI in the final on May 7 Goa dominates Tibet. The finale ends with 6–0, Goa Goa XI won the football feminine Festival 2016, Tibet finished in second place.

On June 18, for the first time in the history of Tibetan women's football, Lhamo Kyi first scorer of the team and the women's Tibet Jamyang Choetso (Wangla) Football captain female Tibet Tibetan became the first women to obtain a license AIFF D coach in Goa, India.

== Achievements ==
- Manipur to Football Tournament 2014: Co-Winner
- Goa Football Women Festival 2016: Finalist

== Individual distinctions ==
- Jamyang Choetso (Wangla): Price for the best scorer of the Manipur Football Tournament 2014.
- Marie Choeying Oehm: Prize for best midfielder of Manipur Football Tournament 2014.

== Squad by year ==
=== Squad 2012 ===
- Tenzin Dekyong
- Tenzin Dolma
- Tenzin Lhamo
- Choezom (cap)
- Tsering Lhamo
- Tenzing Choekyi
- Marie Choeying Oehm
- Jamyang Choetso Wangla
- Kunchok Sangmo
- Ngawang Oetso
- Tenzin Choezom
- Lhamo Kyi
- Rinzin Dolma
- Ngawang-Michael

=== Squad 2013 ===
- Tenzin Yangchen
- Tashi Dolma Talook
- Dhe Ga
- Tenzin Mozron
- Rinzin Ngawang Zen
- Rinzin dolma Tholing
- Tenzin Kunsel
- Tsering Lhamo
- Phurbu Sangmo
- Lingkyi Lhamo Choekyi
- Tenzin yangchen
- Abu Lhamo
- Lhamo Kyi (cap)
- Sonam Palyang
- Tsering Dolma Gultsang
- Jamyang Choetso

=== Squad 2014 ===
Gardienne:

- Tenzin Dekyong

Défense:

- Tenzin Dolma
- Tenzin Lhamo
- Choezom (cap)
- Tsering Lhamo (asst. captain)

Milieu terrain défensif:

- Tenzing Choekyi
- Marie Choeying Oehm

Milieu de terrain:

- Wangla
- Kunchok Sangmo
- Ngawang Oetso

Attaque:

- Tenzin Choezom

=== Squad 2015 ===
- Tenzin Yangzom
- Sherab Dolma
- Phuntsok Dolma
- Lhamo Choekyi
- Yandan Lhamo
- Tenzin Dhekyong
- Tenzin Chozom
- Ngawang Oetso
- Tashi Dolma
- Tenzin Dasel
- Tenzin Youdon
- Sonam Palyang
- Tenzin Tsentso
- Tenzin Norzom
- Tsering Lhamo

=== Squad 2016 ===
- Yangdan Lhamo
- Lhamo Kyi
- Pema Choedon
- Gopso Dhapz
- Jamyang Choetso (cap)
- Sonam Palyang
- Tenzin Dekyong
- Tsering Lhamo
- Tenzin Lhamo
- Ngawang
- Tenzii Chonzom
- Thinley Sangmo
- Kalsang Kyi

== Selected international matches ==
=== 2012 ===
26 May 2012	Tibet	2–0	Himachal Pradesh	India
15:30	Lhamo Kyi x1 Jamyang Choetso x1

9 September 2012	Tibet	0–2	Haryana	India
15:30

=== 2013 ===
25 January 2013	Tibet	4–0	Himachal Pradesh	Dharamsala, India
15:30	Phuntsok Dolma x2 Tenzin Tsomo x1 Ngawang Lhadon x1

13 June 2013	Tibet	2–4	Punjab	Dharamsala, India
15:30	Jamyang Choetso x2

25 June 2013	Tibet	0–0	Punjab	Dharamsala, India
15:30

=== 2014 ===
14 February 2014	Tibet	0–7	Manipur	Manipur, India
15:30

15 February 2014	Tibet	4–2	Manipur	Manipur, India
15:30	Jamyang Choetso x4

16 February 2014	Tibet	2–2	Manipur	Manipur, India
15:30	Jamyang Choetso x1 Ngawang Oetso x1

=== 2015 ===
2 February 2015	Tibet	2–0	Sanskriti School	New Delhi, India
15:30	Phuntsok Dolma x1 Ngawang Oetso x1

4 February 2015	Tibet	1–1	Pendjab Heroes	New Delhi, India
15:30	Ngawang Oetso x1

6 February 2015	Tibet	3–0	New Delhi Manthan Fondation	New Delhi, India
15:30	Rinzin Dolma x1 Ngawang-Michael x2

10 June 2015	Tibet	1–0	Amritsar Girls Team	New Delhi, India
15:30	Jamyang Choetso x1

11 June 2015	Tibet	1–2	The Doon School	New Delhi, India
15:30	Ngawang Oetso x1

12 June 2015	Tibet	3–0	The Doon School	New Delhi, India
15:30	Chozom Tenzin x1 Phuntsok Dolma x2

=== 2016 ===
28 April 2016	Tibet	8–0	Kendriya Vidyalaya School	Dehradun, India
15:30	Jamyang Choetso x4 Lhamo Kyi x1 Thinley Dolma x1 Sonam Sangmo x1 Tsewang Dolma x1

30 April 2016	Tibet	6–0	Woodstock School	Dehradun, India
15:30	Jamyang Choetso x3 Ngawang Oetso x1 Sonam Sangmo x1 Lhakpa Bhuti x1

5 May 2016	Tibet	4–0	Viva North Goa	Mapusa, India
15:30	Jamyang Choetso x2 Ngawang Oetso x1 Dhondup Lhamo x1

7 May 2016	Tibet	0–6	Goa	Mapusa, India
15:30

=== 2022 ===
1 July 2022 2022 CONIFA Women's World Football Cup	Tibet	1–13	Sápmi	Paonta Sahib
	Ngawang Oetso 59'		Sandra Simonsen; Moa Öhman; Karoline Fossli; Sofie Sörensen

3 July 2022 2022 CONIFA Women's World Football Cup	Sápmi	9–0	Tibet	Paonta Sahib
	Moa Öhman 7', 57', 71', 89'; Emelie Kristiansen 38'; Klara Norlemann 43'; Sandra Simonsen 46', 83'; Wilma Ritzen 48'

== Top goalscorers ==
#	Player	Year(s)	Goals	Caps
1	Jaymang Choetso	2012–	18	16
2	Ngawang Oetso	2012–	6	16
3	Phuntsok Dolma	2012–	5	12
4	Ngawang-Michael	2012–	2	12
5	Lhamo Kyi	2012–	2	13
6	Sonam Sangmo	2012–	2	13
7	Rinzin Dolma	2012–	1	13
8	Thinley Dolma	2012–	1	13
9	Tsewang Dolma	2012–	1	13
10	Lhakpa Bhuti	2014–	1	10
11	Tenzin Chozom	2012–	1	10
12	Dhondup Lhamo	2012–	1	10
13	Tenzin Tsomo	2012–	1	10
14	Ngawang Lhadon	2012–	1	10

== Coaches ==
Statistics correct as of 30 March 2016

Manager	Dates	P	W	D	L	Win %
(United States) Cassie Childers	2011–2015	11	5	3	3	45.5
(Tibet) Gompo Dorjee	2015–	7	5	0	2	71.4
