= Alcochete =

Municipality in Setúbal, Portugal

- Municipality
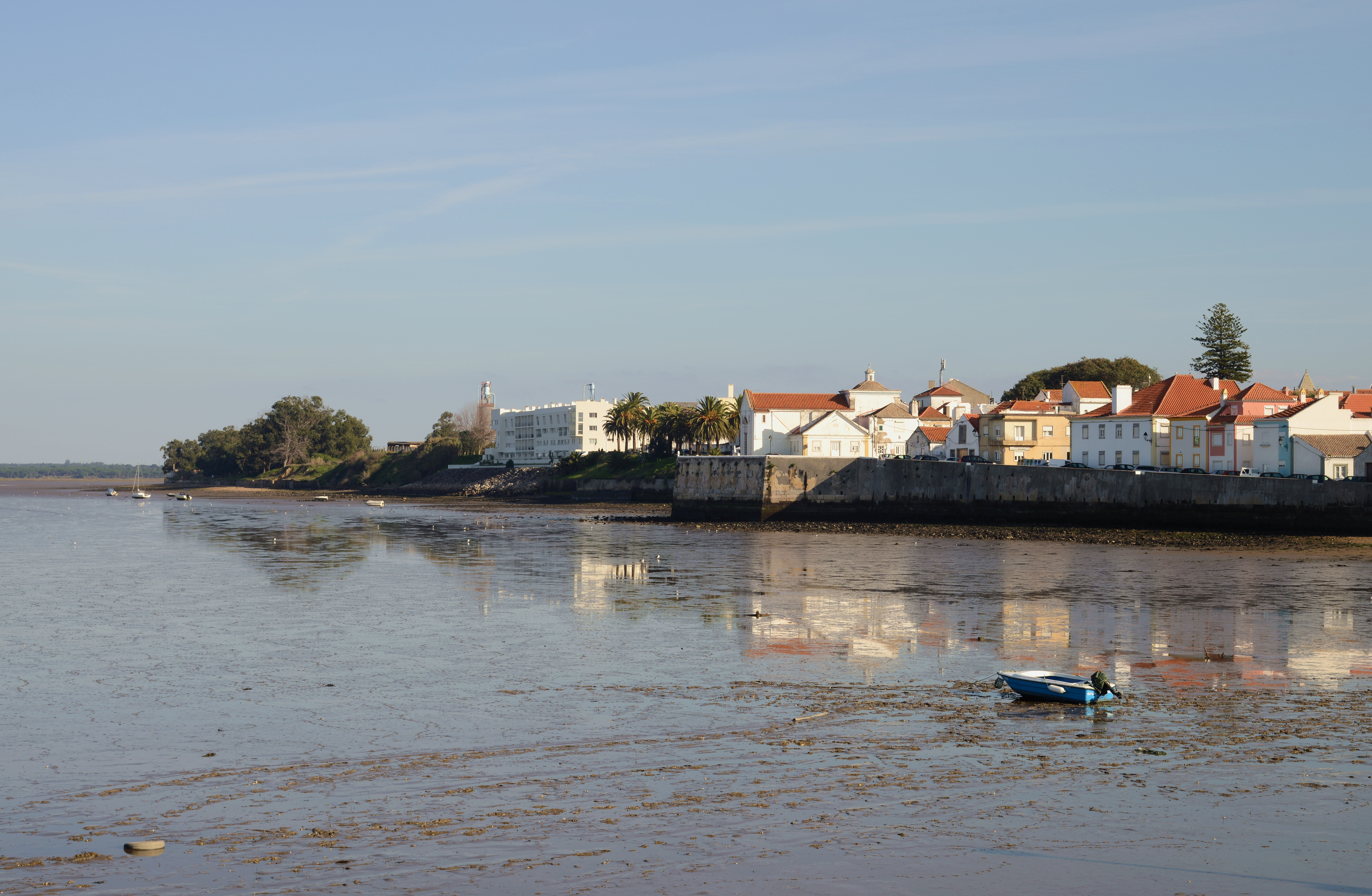
- View of the old part of the city of Alcochete.

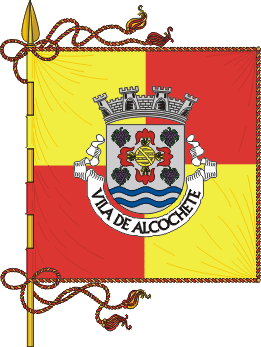
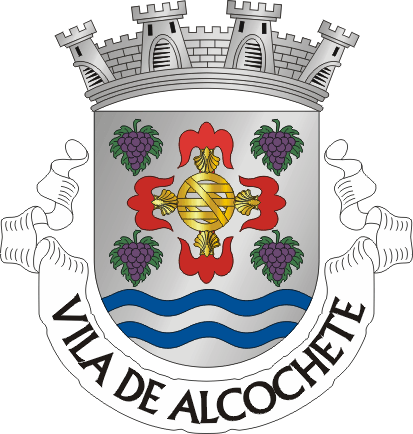
- Flag Coat of arms
- Interactive map of Alcochete
- Location in Portugal
- Coordinates: 38°45′N 8°58′W
- Country: Portugal
- Region: Lisbon
- Metropolitan area: Lisbon
- District: Setúbal
- Parishes: 3

Government
  - President: Fernando Pinto (PS)

Area
  - Total: 128.36 km^{2} (49.56 sq mi)

Population (2011)
  - Total: 17,569
  - Density: 136.87/km^{2} (354.50/sq mi)
- Time zone: UTC+00:00 (WET)
  - Summer (DST): UTC+01:00 (WEST)
- Local holiday: Saint John; June 24
- Website: http://www.cm-alcochete.pt

Alcochete (Portuguese pronunciation: [alkuˈʃetɨ]) is a municipality in Portugal. The population in 2011 was 17,569, in an area of 128.36 km². The municipality is composed of three parishes and is located in Setúbal District.

Alcochete is known for its bullfighting tradition and its proximity to the second-longest bridge in Europe, the Vasco da Gama Bridge.

The actual site of present-day Alcochete was already occupied during Roman times with a clay production facility. Its name is thought to derive from the Arabic word for oven for reasons not yet understood. It became a vacation site preferred by the Portuguese royalty and the future king D. Manuel I was born in the village. It has experienced major development due to the construction of the Vasco da Gama Bridge.

On 10 January 2008 Portuguese prime minister José Sócrates announced that Alcochete had been selected as the site of the new airport serving Lisbon, Portugal's capital. The location of Alcochete as the construction site of the future Lisbon Airport was confirmed by the Portuguese Government on May 8, 2008.

Sporting Clube de Portugal (Sporting CP or Sporting Portugal) has a football training facility (Academia Sporting/Cristiano Ronaldo in Alcochete), which accommodated Portugal during the Euro 2004 competition.

== Demographics ==
Historical population

Year	Pop.	±%
1864	4,286	—
1878	4,517	+5.4%
1890	4,997	+10.6%
1900	6,088	+21.8%
1911	6,502	+6.8%
1920	6,175	−5.0%
1930	6,656	+7.8%
1940	6,658	+0.0%

Year	Pop.	±%
1950	7,864	+18.1%
1960	9,270	+17.9%
1970	10,410	+12.3%
1981	11,246	+8.0%
1991	10,169	−9.6%
2001	13,010	+27.9%
2011	17,569	+35.0%
2021	19,143	+9.0%

Source: INE

== Parishes ==
Administratively, the municipality is divided into 3 civil parishes (freguesias):

- Alcochete
- Samouco
- São Francisco

== Notable people ==
- Manuel I of Portugal (1469–1521) King of Portugal from 1495 to 1521, member of the House of Aviz
- Francisco Rodrigues da Cruz (1859–1948) a Portuguese priest of the Catholic Church, known as Father Cruz
- Frederico Barrigana (1922–2007) a Portuguese football goalkeeper with 260 caps with FC Porto.
- Francisco Bolota (born 1946) a Portuguese former footballer with approximately 250 club caps
