= 2024–25 Stade Rennais FC season =

Stade Rennais FC
2024–25 season
- Owner: Artémis
- President: Olivier Cloarec
- Head coach: Julien Stéphan (until 7 November); Jorge Sampaoli (from 11 November to 30 January); Habib Beye (from 30 January)
- Stadium: Roazhon Park
- Ligue 1: 12th
- Coupe de France: Round of 16
- Top goalscorer: League: Arnaud Kalimuendo (17); All: Arnaud Kalimuendo (18)
- Average home league attendance: 27,375
Home colours	Away colours	Third colours

The 2024–25 season was the 124th season in the history of Stade Rennais Football Club, and the club's 31st consecutive season in Ligue 1. In addition to the domestic league, the club participated in the Coupe de France.

== Players ==
=== First-team squad ===
As of 6 February 2025

Note: Flags indicate national team as defined under FIFA eligibility rules; some limited exceptions apply. Players may hold more than one non-FIFA nationality.

No.	Pos.	Nation	Player
1	GK	FRA	Brice Samba
3	DF	FRA	Adrien Truffert (captain)
4	DF	CMR	Christopher Wooh
5	DF	FRA	Lilian Brassier (on loan from Brest)
6	MF	NED	Azor Matusiwa
7	FW	JPN	Kyōgo Furuhashi
8	MF	CIV	Seko Fofana
9	FW	FRA	Arnaud Kalimuendo
10	FW	FRA	Ludovic Blas
11	FW	JOR	Musa Al-Taamari
15	DF	SEN	Mikayil Faye
17	MF	WAL	Jordan James
18	DF	CMR	Aboubakar Nagida
19	FW	BEL	Kazeem Olaigbe
20	FW	COL	Andrés Gómez

No.	Pos.	Nation	Player
22	DF	FRA	Lorenz Assignon
23	GK	FRA	Gauthier Gallon
24	DF	FRA	Anthony Rouault
28	MF	BEL	Ayanda Sishuba
30	GK	FRA	Steve Mandanda
32	MF	FRA	Naouirou Ahamada (on loan from Crystal Palace)
33	DF	NED	Hans Hateboer
36	DF	GHA	Alidu Seidu
38	MF	FRA	Djaoui Cissé
40	GK	CAF	Geoffrey Lembet
42	DF	FRA	Jérémy Jacquet
48	DF	MAR	Abdelhamid Aït Boudlal
80	GK	TUR	Doğan Alemdar
90	MF	CAN	Ismaël Koné (on loan from Marseille)

=== Out on loan ===
Note: Flags indicate national team as defined under FIFA eligibility rules; some limited exceptions apply. Players may hold more than one non-FIFA nationality.

No.	Pos.	Nation	Player
—	DF	MAR	Mohamed Jaouab (at Amiens until 30 June 2025)
—	DF	COM	Warmed Omari (at Lyon until 30 June 2025)
—	DF	NOR	Leo Østigård (at TSG Hoffenheim until 30 June 2025)
—	MF	DEN	Albert Grønbæk (at Southampton until 30 June 2025)
—	MF	FIN	Glen Kamara (at Al Shabab until 30 June 2025)
—	MF	SUI	Fabian Rieder (at VfB Stuttgart until 30 June 2025)

No.	Pos.	Nation	Player
—	MF	FRA	Baptiste Santamaria (at Nice until 30 June 2025)
—	FW	GAB	Alan Do Marcolino (at Orléans until 30 June 2025)
—	FW	DEN	Henrik Meister (at Pisa until 30 June 2025)
—	FW	MAR	Ibrahim Salah (at Brest until 30 June 2025)
—	FW	TUR	Bertuğ Yıldırım (at Getafe until 30 June 2025)

== Transfers ==
=== In ===
Pos.	Player	Transferred from	Fee	Date	Source
FW	(France) Matthis Abline	(France) Nantes	Loan return	30 June 2024	
DF	(Morocco) Mohamed Jaouab	(France) Amiens	€1,000,000	1 July 2024	
MF	(Denmark) Albert Grønbæk	(Norway) Bodø/Glimt	€15,000,000	15 July 2024	
MF	(Finland) Glen Kamara	(England) Leeds United	€10,000,000	16 July 2024	
DF	(Norway) Leo Østigård	(Italy) Napoli	€7,000,000	30 July 2024	
DF	(Netherlands) Hans Hateboer	(Italy) Atalanta	Undisclosed	6 August 2024	
MF	(Wales) Jordan James	(England) Birmingham City	€5,000,000	12 August 2024	
FW	(Denmark) Henrik Meister	(Norway) Sarpsborg 08	€7,000,000	15 August 2024	
FW	(Colombia) Andrés Gómez	(United States) Real Salt Lake	€10,500,000	16 August 2024	
DF	(Senegal) Mikayil Faye	(Spain) Barcelona B	€10,300,000	25 August 2024	
FW	(Portugal) Jota	(Saudi Arabia) Al-Ittihad	€8,000,000	30 August 2024	
MF	(France) Naouirou Ahamada	(England) Crystal Palace	Loan	30 August 2024	
MF	(Ivory Coast) Seko Fofana	(Saudi Arabia) Al-Nassr	€20,000,000	1 January 2025	
GK	(France) Brice Samba	(France) Lens	€14,000,000	8 January 2025	
FW	(Japan) Kyōgo Furuhashi	(Scotland) Celtic	€10,000,000	27 January 2025	
DF	(France) Lilian Brassier	(France) Brest	Loan	31 January 2025	
DF	(France) Anthony Rouault	(Germany) VfB Stuttgart	€13,000,000	3 February 2025	
FW	(Jordan) Musa Al-Taamari	(France) Montpellier	€8,000,000	3 February 2025	
MF	(Belgium) Ayanda Sishuba	(Italy) Hellas Verona	€500,000	3 February 2025	
FW	(Belgium) Kazeem Olaigbe	(Belgium) Cercle Brugge	€6,000,000	3 February 2025	
DF	(France) Jérémy Jacquet	(France) Clermont	Loan return	3 February 2025	
MF	(Canada) Ismaël Koné	(France) Marseille	Loan (€1,000,000)	3 February 2025	

=== Out ===
Pos.	Player	Transferred to	Fee	Date	Source
DF	(France) Jeanuël Belocian	(Germany) Bayer Leverkusen	€15,000,000	1 July 2024	
MF	(Switzerland) Fabian Rieder	(Germany) VfB Stuttgart	Loan	1 July 2024	
FW	(France) Matthis Abline	(France) Nantes	€12,000,000	3 July 2024	
GK	(Senegal) Alfred Gomis	(Italy) Palermo	Undisclosed	6 July 2024	
MF	(France) Enzo Le Fée	(Italy) Roma	€23,000,000	10 July 2024	
FW	(France) Martin Terrier	(Germany) Bayer Leverkusen	€20,000,000	18 July 2024	
DF	(Ivory Coast) Guéla Doué	(France) Strasbourg	€6,000,000	26 July 2024	
DF	(France) Jérémy Jacquet	(France) Clermont	Loan	6 August 2024	
MF	(France) Désiré Doué	(France) Paris Saint-Germain	€50,000,000	17 August 2024	
DF	(Belgium) Arthur Theate	(Germany) Eintracht Frankfurt	Loan	17 August 2024	
FW	(Turkey) Bertuğ Yıldırım	(Spain) Getafe	Loan	23 August 2024	
MF	(France) Benjamin Bourigeaud	(Qatar) Al-Duhail	€10,000,000	30 August 2024	
FW	(Morocco) Ibrahim Salah	(France) Brest	Loan	30 August 2024	
FW	(France) Mathis Lambourde	(Italy) Hellas Verona	Free	30 August 2024	
DF	(Comoros) Warmed Omari	(France) Lyon	Loan (€500,000)	30 August 2024	
DF	(Morocco) Mohamed Jaouab	(France) Amiens	Loan	30 August 2024	
FW	(Denmark) Henrik Meister	(Italy) Pisa	Loan	13 January 2025	
MF	(Denmark) Albert Grønbæk	(England) Southampton	Loan	21 January 2025	
MF	(France) Baptiste Santamaria	(France) Nice	Loan	22 January 2025	
FW	(Portugal) Jota	(Scotland) Celtic	€9,000,000	27 January 2025	
MF	(Finland) Glen Kamara	(Saudi Arabia) Al-Shabab	Loan	31 January 2025	
FW	(Algeria) Amine Gouiri	(France) Marseille	€19,000,000	31 January 2025	
DF	(Belgium) Arthur Theate	(Germany) Eintracht Frankfurt	€16,000,000	2 February 2025	
DF	(Norway) Leo Østigård	(Germany) TSG Hoffenheim	Loan	3 February 2025	
DF	(Morocco) Abdelhamid Aït Boudlal	(France) Amiens	Loan	3 February 2025	

== Friendlies ==
=== Pre-season ===
13 July 2024 Friendly	Saint-Malo	3–3	Rennes	Dinard
18:00 CEST (UTC+2)	Gerbeaud 37'; Barroug 41'; Heinry 57'	Report	Wooh 28'; Bourigeaud 45'; Blas 90'	Stadium: Stade du COSEC

20 July 2024 Friendly	Rennes	2–1	Laval	Dinard
17:30 CEST (UTC+2)	Grønbæk 15'; Do Marcolino 74'	Report	Tell 48'	Stadium: Stade du COSEC

27 July 2024 Friendly	Angers	1–2	Rennes	Vitré
18:00 CEST (UTC+2)	Hountondji 22'	Report	Gouiri 4', 17'	Stadium: Stade Municipal

31 July 2024 Friendly	Guingamp	3–0	Rennes	Guingamp
17:00 CEST (UTC+2)	Siwe 19'; Louiserre 40' (pen.); Sagna 45'	Report		Stadium: Stade de Roudourou

3 August 2024 Friendly	Rennes	2–0	Real Sociedad	Rennes
19:00 CEST (UTC+2)	Grønbæk 22'; Seidu (yellow card) 45'; Gouiri 67'; Wooh (yellow card) 90+1'	Report	Olasagasti (yellow card) 34'	Stadium: Roazhon Park; Attendance: 14,643; Referee: Maxime Jamet (France)

10 August 2024 Friendly	Rennes	1–1	Werder Bremen	Rennes, France
14:30 CEST (UTC+2)	Do Marcolino 35'	Report	Malatini 13'	Stadium: Roazhon Park; Attendance: 0 Referee: Thierry Bouille (France)

10 August 2024 Friendly	Rennes	1–0	Werder Bremen	Rennes, France
17:00 CEST (UTC+2)	Bourigeaud 48'	Report		Stadium: Roazhon Park; Referee: Bastien Dechepy (France)

== Competitions ==
=== Overall record ===
Competition	First match	Last match	Starting round	Final position	Record							
Competition	First match	Last match	Starting round	Final position	Pld	W	D	L	GF	GA	GD	Win %
Ligue 1	18 August 2024	17 May 2025	Matchday 1	12th	34	13	2	19	51	50	+1	38.24
Coupe de France	22 December 2024	15 January 2025	Round of 64	Round of 32	2	1	0	1	4	2	+2	50.00
Total					36	14	2	20	55	52	+3	38.89

Source: Soccerway

=== Ligue 1 ===
==== League table ====
Pos	Team	Pld	W	D	L	GF	GA	GD	Pts
10	Toulouse	34	11	9	14	44	43	+1	42
11	Auxerre	34	11	9	14	48	51	−3	42
12	Rennes	34	13	2	19	51	50	+1	41
13	Nantes	34	8	12	14	39	52	−13	36
14	Angers	34	10	6	18	32	53	−21	36

Source: Ligue 1
Rules for classification: 1) Points; 2) Goal difference; 3) Head-to-head points; 4) Head-to-head goal difference; 5) Head-to-head goals scored; 6) Head-to-head away goals scored; 7) Goals scored; 8) Away goals scored; 9) Fair-play points (Note: Head-to-head record is used only after all the matches between the teams in question have been played).

==== Results summary ====
Overall								Home						Away					
Pld	W	D	L	GF	GA	GD	Pts	W	D	L	GF	GA	GD	W	D	L	GF	GA	GD
34	13	2	19	51	50	+1	41	9	1	7	25	17	+8	4	1	12	26	33	−7

Source: Ligue 1

==== Results by round ====
Round	1	2	3	4	5	6	7	8	9	10	11	12	13	14	15	16	17	18	19	20	21	22	23	24	25	26	27	28	29	30	31	32	33	34
Ground	H	A	A	H	H	A	H	A	H	A	H	A	H	A	H	A	H	H	A	H	A	H	H	A	H	A	A	H	A	H	A	A	H	A
Result	W	L	L	W	D	L	L	D	W	L	L	L	W	L	W	L	L	L	L	W	W	L	W	W	L	L	W	L	W	W	L	L	W	L
Position	3	8	11	7	8	10	12	13	11	13	13	15	12	12	12	13	14	14	16	15	12	13	13	11	12	12	12	12	11	10	11	11	11	12

Source: Ligue 1
A = Away; H = Home; W = Win; D = Draw; L = Loss

==== Matches ====
The league schedule was released on 21 June 2024.

18 August 2024 1	Rennes	3–0	Lyon	Rennes
20:45 CEST (UTC+2)	Bourigeaud 19'; Gouiri 21'; Østigård (yellow card) 42'; Assignon (yellow card) 64'; Meister 90+1'	Report	Ćaleta-Car (yellow card) 44'; Mikautadze (penalty missed) 71'	Stadium: Roazhon Park; Attendance: 26,026; Referee: Benoît Millot

25 August 2024 2	Strasbourg	3–1	Rennes	Strasbourg
17:00 CEST (UTC+2)	Andrey Santos 23'; Emegha 48'; Moreira (yellow card) 55'; Wooh 87' (o.g.); Mara (yellow card) 89'	Report	Wooh (yellow card) 19'; Seidu (yellow card) 40'; Blas 57'; Østigård (yellow card) 89'; James (yellow card) 90'	Stadium: Stade de la Meinau; Attendance: 19,026; Referee: Eric Wattellier

1 September 2024 3	Reims	2–1	Rennes	Reims
17:00 CEST (UTC+2)	Buta (yellow card) 31'; Itō 41'; Diakité 48'; Okumu (yellow card) 90+3'	Report	Østigård 13'; Truffert (yellow card) 53'	Stadium: Stade Auguste-Delaune; Attendance: 12,856; Referee: Mathieu Vernice

15 September 2024 4	Rennes	3–0	Montpellier	Rennes
15:00 CEST (UTC+2)	Seidu (yellow card) 8'; Blas 24'; Kalimuendo 35'; Grønbæk 60'	Report	Sagnan (yellow card) 22'; Nzingoula (yellow card) 79'; Džodić (yellow card) 85'	Stadium: Roazhon Park; Attendance: 27,451; Referee: Jérémie Pignard

21 September 2024 5	Rennes	1–1	Lens	Rennes
19:00 CEST (UTC+2)	Kalimuendo 24' (pen.); Blas (yellow card) 45'; Hateboer (yellow card) 90+9'	Report	Labeau (yellow card) 34'; Medina (yellow card) 73'; Ojediran (yellow card) 77'; Nzola 90+6'; Saïd (yellow card) 90+10'	Stadium: Roazhon Park; Attendance: 28,500; Referee: Jérémy Stinat

27 September 2024 6	Paris Saint-Germain	3–1	Rennes	Paris
21:00 CEST (UTC+2)	Barcola 30', 68'; Dembelé (yellow card) 47'; Zaïre-Emery (yellow card) 52'; Lee 58'	Report	Santamaria (yellow card) 31'; Assignon (yellow card) 42'; Wooh (yellow card) 65'; Kalimuendo 75' (pen.)	Stadium: Parc des Princes; Attendance: 47,582; Referee: Hakim Ben El Hadj

5 October 2024 7	Rennes	1–2	Monaco	Rennes
21:00 CEST (UTC+2)	Blas 11', (yellow card) 44'; Assignon (yellow card) 75'	Report	Kehrer 6'; Balogun 22'; Zakaria (yellow card) 45+8'; Ouattara (yellow card) 57'; Minamino (yellow card) 72'; Köhn (yellow card) 86'	Stadium: Roazhon Park; Attendance: 26,533; Referee: Thomas Léonard

19 October 2024 8	Brest	1–1	Rennes	Brest
17:00 CEST (UTC+2)	Del Castillo 54' (pen.); Ajorque (yellow card) 62'; Ndiaye (yellow card) 90+2'	Report	Truffert (yellow card) 39'; Seidu (yellow card) 72'; Jota 86'	Stadium: Stade Francis-Le Blé; Attendance: 15,099; Referee: Bastien Dechepy

25 October 2024 9	Rennes	1–0	Le Havre	Rennes
21:00 CEST (UTC+2)	Seidu (yellow card) 32'; Gómez 54'; Grønbæk (yellow card) 66'	Report	Salmier (yellow card) 35'; Kinkoue (yellow card) 89'; Opéri (yellow card) 90+5' (yellow-red card) 90+5'	Stadium: Roazhon Park; Attendance: 27,130; Referee: Florent Batta

3 November 2024 10	Auxerre	4–0	Rennes	Auxerre
17:00 CET (UTC+1)	Perrin 27', 39'; Sinayoko 65' (pen.); Onaiwu 90+2'	Report	Matusiwa (yellow card) 35'; Faye (yellow card) 64'	Stadium: Stade de l'Abbé-Deschamps; Attendance: 16,366; Referee: Gaël Angoula

10 November 2024 11	Rennes	0–2	Toulouse	Rennes
17:00 CET (UTC+1)	Gouiri (yellow card) 41'; Assignon (yellow card) 44'; Truffert (yellow card) 45+1'	Report	King 14'; Dønnum 23'; Cásseres (yellow card) 48'	Stadium: Roazhon Park; Attendance: 27,525; Referee: Romain Lissorgue

24 November 2024 12	Lille	1–0	Rennes	Villeneuve-d'Ascq
15:00 CET (UTC+1)	Mandi (yellow card) 40'; Zhegrova 45'; Alexsandro (yellow card) 48'; Fernandez-Pardo (yellow card) 90+2'	Report	Nagida (yellow card) 23'; Østigård (yellow card) 90+4'	Stadium: Stade Pierre-Mauroy; Attendance: 46,019; Referee: Mathieu Vernice

30 November 2024 13	Rennes	5–0	Saint-Étienne	Rennes
17:00 CET (UTC+1)	Kalimuendo 39' (pen.), 61', 67' (pen.); Blas 45+6'; Gouiri 53'	Report	Cafaro (red card) 37'; Larsonneur (yellow card) 81'	Stadium: Roazhon Park; Attendance: 27,586; Referee: Marc Bollengier

8 December 2024 14	Nantes	1–0	Rennes	Nantes
17:00 CET (UTC+1)	Douglas Augusto (yellow card) 54'; Simon 89'	Report	Faye (red card) 45+4'; Kalimuendo (yellow card) 90+6'	Stadium: Stade de la Beaujoire; Attendance: 28,418; Referee: Eric Wattellier

15 December 2024 15	Rennes	2–0	Angers	Rennes
17:00 CET (UTC+1)	Grønbæk 33'; James (yellow card) 39'; Østigård (yellow card) 56'; Kalimuendo (yellow card) 80'; Assignon 90+2'	Report	Ferhat (yellow card) 78'	Stadium: Roazhon Park; Attendance: 27,781; Referee: Hakim Ben El Hadj

3 January 2025 16	Nice	3–2	Rennes	Nice
21:00 CET (UTC+1)	Boudaoui (yellow card) 10'; Guessand 12'; Diop 34', (yellow card) 66'; Laborde 45+5'; Rosario (red card) 90+2'; Ndayishimiye (yellow card) 90+3'	Report	Kalimuendo 27'; Assignon (yellow card) 31'; Truffert 49'; Matusiwa (yellow card) 61'; Blas (yellow card) 90+3'	Stadium: Allianz Riviera; Attendance: 21,332; Referee: Jérôme Brisard

11 January 2025 17	Rennes	1–2	Marseille	Rennes
21:00 CET (UTC+1)	Kalimuendo (penalty missed) 32', 43'; Hateboer (yellow card) 63'; Assignon (yellow card) 90+6'	Report	Greenwood 45'; Rabiot 49'; Cornelius (yellow card) 90+2'; Balerdi (yellow card) 90+2'	Stadium: Roazhon Park; Attendance: 26,837; Referee: Abdelatif Kherradji

18 January 2025 18	Rennes	1–2	Brest	Rennes
19:00 CET (UTC+1)	Blas (yellow card) 41', (goal) 77'; Fofana (yellow card) 90+3'	Report	Magnetti 27'; Zogbé (yellow card) 44'; Camara (yellow card) 71'; Ajorque 73'; Sima (yellow card) 90+6'	Stadium: Roazhon Park; Attendance: 28,238; Referee: Thomas Léonard

25 January 2025 19	Monaco	3–2	Rennes	Monaco
17:00 CET (UTC+1)	Akliouche 15', (yellow card) 90+4'; Biereth 52'; Golovin 56'; Mawissa (yellow card) 63'; Minamino (yellow card) 73'	Report	Nagida 45+1'; Gouiri 67', (yellow card) 75'; Wooh (yellow card) 70'; Hateboer (yellow card) 87'	Stadium: Stade Louis II; Attendance: 5,725; Referee: Jérémy Stinat

2 February 2025 20	Rennes	1–0	Strasbourg	Rennes
17:15 CET (UTC+1)	Cissé (yellow card) 15'; Samba (yellow card) 71'; James (yellow card) 85'; Blas 89'	Report	Moreira (yellow card) 75'; Doukouré (yellow card) 85'; Diarra (yellow card) 90+1'	Stadium: Roazhon Park; Attendance: 26,621; Referee: Stéphanie Frappart

8 February 2025 21	Saint-Étienne	0–2	Rennes	Saint-Étienne
21:05 CET (UTC+1)	Ekwah (yellow card) 68'	Report	Wooh (yellow card) 12'; Kalimuendo 15'; James (yellow card) 17'; Blas (yellow card) 23'; Fofana (yellow card) 64'; Samba (yellow card) 77'; Nagida 84'	Stadium: Stade Geoffroy-Guichard; Attendance: 30,385; Referee: Mathieu Vernice

16 February 2025 22	Rennes	0–2	Lille	Rennes
20:45 CET (UTC+1)	Wooh (yellow card) 42', (red card) 74'; Cissé (yellow card) 60'	Report	Ismaily (yellow card) 37'; Akpom (penalty missed) 44', 86'; Bentaleb 80'	Stadium: Roazhon Park; Attendance: 27,627; Referee: Romain Lissorgue

21 February 2025 23	Rennes	1–0	Reims	Rennes
20:45 CET (UTC+1)	Kalimuendo 10' (pen.); Cissé (yellow card) 38'	Report	Kipré (red card) 5'; Ibrahim (yellow card) 79' (yellow-red card) 89'	Stadium: Roazhon Park; Attendance: 26,818; Referee: Marc Bollengier

2 March 2025 24	Montpellier	0–4	Rennes	Montpellier
17:15 CET (UTC+1)	Ferri (yellow card) 18'; Kouyaté (yellow card) 40'	Report	Fofana 28', (yellow card) 35'; Cissé 56'; Assignon 69'; Kalimuendo (penalty missed) 87', 87'	Stadium: Stade de la Mosson; Attendance: 11,990; Referee: Florent Batta

8 March 2025 25	Rennes	1–4	Paris Saint-Germain	Rennes
17:00 CET (UTC+1)	Samba (yellow card) 34'; Brassier 53'; Rouault (yellow card) 58'	Report	Barcola 27', (yellow card) 45+2'; Hernandez (yellow card) 36'; Ramos 50'; Dembélé 90+1', 90+4'; Hakimi (yellow card) 90+7'	Stadium: Roazhon Park; Attendance: 28,550; Referee: Mathieu Vernice

15 March 2025 26	Lens	1–0	Rennes	Lens
21:05 CET (UTC+1)	Saïd 47'; El Aynaoui (yellow card) 69'	Report	Matusiwa (yellow card) 21'	Stadium: Stade Bollaert-Delelis; Attendance: 38,182; Referee: Stéphanie Frappart

30 March 2025 27	Angers	0–3	Rennes	Angers
17:15 CEST (UTC+2)	Capelle (yellow card) 45+6'	Report	Kalimuendo 13', 90+5'; Koné 70'	Stadium: Stade Raymond Kopa; Attendance: 11,700; Referee: Thomas Léonard

6 April 2025 28	Rennes	0–1	Auxerre	Rennes
17:15 CEST (UTC+2)		Report	Jubal 89'	Stadium: Roazhon Park; Attendance: 28,268; Referee: Florent Batta

13 April 2025 29	Le Havre	1–5	Rennes	Le Havre
17:15 CEST (UTC+2)	Sangante (yellow card) 8'; Mwanga 42'; Zouaoui (yellow card) 49'	Report	Matusiwa 1'; Assignon 12', (yellow card) 41'; Kalimuendo 15'; Cissé (yellow card) 29'; Al-Taamari 57'; Gómez 89', (yellow card) 90+4'	Stadium: Stade Océane; Attendance: 21,582; Referee: Willy Delajod

18 April 2025 30	Rennes	2–1	Nantes	Rennes
18:45 CEST (UTC+2)	Truffert 23'; Assignon (yellow card) 44'; Al-Taamari (yellow card) 45+5'; Meïté 86'; Blas (yellow card) 90+5'	Report	Lopes (yellow card) 12'; Zézé (yellow card) 20'; Mohamed (yellow card) 28', (goal) 54'; Augusto (yellow card) 45+5'; Coco (red card) 57'; Amian (yellow card) 86'	Stadium: Roazhon Park; Attendance: 27,880; Referee: Abdelatif Kherradji

26 April 2025 31	Lyon	4–1	Rennes	Décines-Charpieu
21:05 CEST (UTC+2)	Fofana 8'; Tolisso 25'; Lacazette 39'; Mikautadze 77'	Report	Meïté 77'	Stadium: Parc Olympique Lyonnais; Attendance: 51,034; Referee: Marc Bollengier

3 May 2025 32	Toulouse	2–1	Rennes	Toulouse
19:00 CEST (UTC+2)	Cresswell (yellow card) 15'; Gboho 28'; Magri (yellow card) 65'; Dønnum 82'; Restes (yellow card) 90+6'	Report	Rouault (yellow card) 45+2'; Wooh (yellow card) 47'; Kalimuendo 65'	Stadium: Stadium de Toulouse; Attendance: 23,922; Referee: Benoît Millot

10 May 2025 33	Rennes	2–0	Nice	Rennes
21:00 CEST (UTC+2)	Kalimuendo 15', 80'; Brassier (yellow card) 90+4'	Report	Rosario (yellow card) 45+2'	Stadium: Roazhon Park; Attendance: 26,118; Referee: Jérémy Stinat

17 May 2025 34	Marseille	4–2	Rennes	Marseille
21:00 CEST (UTC+2)	Greenwood 21' (pen.), 45+1', (penalty missed) 27'; Rabiot 38', 90+2'; Luiz Felipe (yellow card) 40'; Murillo (yellow card) 64'; Dedić (yellow card) 89'	Report	Koné 14', (yellow card) 29'; Rouault (yellow card) 30'; Assignon (yellow card) 50'; Gómez 77'	Stadium: Stade Vélodrome; Attendance: 57,274; Referee: Jérémie Pignard

=== Coupe de France ===
22 December 2024 Round of 64	Bordeaux	1–4	Rennes	Bordeaux
14:45 CET (UTC+1)	Bahassa 18'; Grillot (yellow card) 64'; Assogba (yellow card) 70'	Report	Truffert 29'; Hateboer (yellow card) 34'; James (yellow card) 53', (goal) 59'; Assignon 75'; Kalimuendo 79'	Stadium: Matmut Atlantique; Attendance: 19,877; Referee: Bastien Dechepy

15 January 2025 Round of 32	Troyes	1–0	Rennes	Troyes
18:30 CET (UTC+1)	Mendes (yellow card) 10'; Saïd (penalty missed) 27', 56'; Gozzi (yellow card) 58'	Report	Wooh (yellow card) 32'	Stadium: Stade de l'Aube; Attendance: 4,690; Referee: Romain Lissorgue
