= 2023–24 Stade Rennais FC season =

Stade Rennais F.C.
2023–24 season
- President: Nicolas Holveck
- Head coach: Bruno Génésio (until 19 November); Julien Stéphan (from 19 November)
- Stadium: Roazhon Park
- Ligue 1: 10th
- Coupe de France: Semi-finals
- UEFA Europa League: Knockout round play-offs
- Top goalscorer: League: Arnaud Kalimuendo (10); All: Benjamin Bourigeaud; Arnaud Kalimuendo (15 each)
Home colours	Away colours	Third colours

The 2023–24 season was Stade Rennais Football Club's 123rd season in existence and 30th consecutive season in Ligue 1. They also competed in the Coupe de France and the UEFA Europa League.

== Players ==
=== First-team squad ===
As of 1 February 2024

Note: Flags indicate national team as defined under FIFA eligibility rules; some limited exceptions apply. Players may hold more than one non-FIFA nationality.

No.	Pos.	Nation	Player
1	GK	FRA	Gauthier Gallon
3	DF	FRA	Adrien Truffert
5	DF	BEL	Arthur Theate
6	MF	NED	Azor Matusiwa
7	FW	FRA	Martin Terrier
8	MF	FRA	Baptiste Santamaria
9	FW	FRA	Arnaud Kalimuendo
10	FW	ALG	Amine Gouiri
11	MF	FRA	Ludovic Blas
14	MF	FRA	Benjamin Bourigeaud (captain)
15	DF	CMR	Christopher Wooh
16	DF	FRA	Jeanuël Belocian

No.	Pos.	Nation	Player
17	DF	CIV	Guéla Doué
23	DF	FRA	Warmed Omari
28	MF	FRA	Enzo Le Fée
30	GK	FRA	Steve Mandanda (vice-captain)
32	MF	SUI	Fabian Rieder
33	MF	FRA	Désiré Doué
34	FW	MAR	Ibrahim Salah
36	DF	GHA	Alidu Seidu
39	FW	FRA	Mathis Lambourde
40	GK	CAF	Geoffrey Lembet
43	DF	CMR	Aboubakar Nagida
99	FW	TUR	Bertuğ Yıldırım

=== Out on loan ===
Note: Flags indicate national team as defined under FIFA eligibility rules; some limited exceptions apply. Players may hold more than one non-FIFA nationality.

No.	Pos.	Nation	Player
—	GK	TUR	Doğan Alemdar (at Troyes until 30 June 2024)
—	GK	SEN	Alfred Gomis (at Lorient until 30 June 2024)
—	DF	FRA	Lorenz Assignon (at Burnley until 30 June 2024)

No.	Pos.	Nation	Player
—	DF	FRA	Jérémy Jacquet (at Clermont until 30 June 2024)
—	MF	FRA	Matthis Abline (at Nantes until 30 June 2024)
—	FW	GAB	Alan Do Marcolino (at Quevilly-Rouen until 30 June 2024)

== Transfers ==
=== In ===
Pos.	Player	Transferred from	Fee	Date	Source
GK	(France) Gauthier Gallon	(France) Troyes	Undisclosed	5 July 2023	
MF	(France) Ludovic Blas	(France) Nantes	€15,000,000	5 July 2023	
MF	(France) Enzo Le Fée	(France) Lorient	€20,000,000	7 July 2023	
GK	(Central African Republic) Geoffrey Lembet	(France) Sedan	Free	18 July 2023	
MF	(Serbia) Nemanja Matić	(Italy) Roma	€3,000,000	14 August 2023	
DF	(Cameroon) Aboubakar Nagida	(Cameroon) EFBC	Free	21 August 2023	
FW	(Turkey) Bertuğ Yıldırım	(Turkey) Hatayspor	€5,000,000	29 August 2023	
MF	(Switzerland) Fabian Rieder	(Switzerland) Young Boys	€15,000,000	31 August 2023	

=== Out ===
Pos.	Player	Transferred to	Fee	Date	Source
FW	(Guinea) Serhou Guirassy	(Germany) VfB Stuttgart	€9,000,000	1 July 2023	
DF	(Mali) Hamari Traoré	(Spain) Real Sociedad	Free	1 July 2023	
DF	(France) Loïc Badé	(Spain) Sevilla	€12,000,000	1 July 2023	
MF	(France) Andy Diouf	(Switzerland) Basel	€5,500,000	1 July 2023	
GK	(Turkey) Doğan Alemdar	(France) Troyes	Loan	5 July 2023	
MF	(France) Lesley Ugochukwu	(England) Chelsea	€27,000,000	1 August 2023	
MF	(Croatia) Lovro Majer	(Germany) VfL Wolfsburg	€30,000,000	16 August 2023	
DF	(Norway) Birger Meling	(Denmark) Copenhagen	€2,000,000	14 August 2023	
FW	(Belgium) Jérémy Doku	(England) Manchester City	€55,500,000	24 August 2023	
FW	(France) Matthis Abline	(France) Nantes	Loan	25 August 2023	
MF	(France) Loum Tchaouna	(Italy) Salernitana	Undisclosed	31 August 2023	
GK	(Senegal) Alfred Gomis	(France) Lorient	Loan	1 September 2023	
MF	(France) Flavien Tait	(Turkey) Samsunspor	Free	6 September 2023	
MF	(Serbia) Nemanja Matić	(France) Lyon	€2,600,000	27 January 2024	
DF	(France) Jérémy Jacquet	(France) Clermont	Loan	29 January 2024	
DF	(France) Lorenz Assignon	(England) Burnley	Loan	1 February 2024	

=== New contracts ===
Position	Player	Until	Ref.
DF	(France) Adrien Truffert	June 2026	

== Pre-season and friendlies ==
Win Draw Loss

19 July 2023 Friendly	Rennes	1–1	Concarneau	Rennes
17:00 CEST (UTC+2)	Abline 73'	Report	El Khoumisti 52'	Stadium: Centre d'entraînement - La Piverdière

22 July 2023 Friendly	Saint-Malo	1–2	Rennes	Rennes
17:00 CEST (UTC+2)	Diakhaby 41'	Report	Majer 57'; Tait 84'	Stadium: Centre d'entraînement - La Piverdière; Attendance: 1,000

26 July 2023 Friendly	Brest	0–1	Rennes	Dinan
18:00 CEST (UTC+2)	Camara (yellow card) 55'	Report	Blas 24'	Stadium: Stade du Clos Gastel; Attendance: 2,500
Note: Match was played in four periods of thirty minutes each.

29 July 2023 Friendly	Rennes	3–1	West Ham United	Rennes
18:00 CEST (UTC+2)	Santamaria 9'; Kalimuendo 75'; Ogbonna 89' (o.g.)	Report	Souček 66'	Stadium: Roazhon Park; Attendance: 26,387; Referee: Romain Lissorgue (France)

2 August 2023 Friendly	Nottingham Forest	0–5	Rennes	Burton upon Trent, England
19:00 BST (UTC+1)		Report	Bourigeaud 35', 45'; Abline 52'; Majer 57'; Gouiri 90'	Stadium: St George's Park National Football Centre; Referee: Paul Tierney (England)

== Competitions ==
=== Overall record ===
Competition	First match	Last match	Starting round	Final position	Record							
Competition	First match	Last match	Starting round	Final position	Pld	W	D	L	GF	GA	GD	Win %
Ligue 1	13 August 2023	19 May 2024	Matchday 1	10th	34	12	10	12	53	46	+7	35.29
Coupe de France	7 January 2024	3 April 2024	Round of 64	Semi-finals	5	3	1	1	12	4	+8	60.00
UEFA Europa League	21 September 2023	22 February 2024	Group stage	Knockout round play-offs	8	5	0	3	16	11	+5	62.50
Total					47	20	11	16	81	61	+20	42.55

Source: Soccerway

=== Ligue 1 ===
==== League table ====
Pos	Team	Pld	W	D	L	GF	GA	GD	Pts
8	Marseille	34	13	11	10	52	41	+11	50
9	Reims	34	13	8	13	42	47	−5	47
10	Rennes	34	12	10	12	53	46	+7	46
11	Toulouse	34	11	10	13	42	46	−4	43
12	Montpellier (Note: Montpellier was deducted one point for uncontrolled crowd trouble that caused the abandonment of its match against Clermont.)	34	10	12	12	43	48	−5	41

Source: Ligue 1
Rules for classification: 1) Points; 2) Goal difference; 3) Head-to-head points; 4) Head-to-head goal difference; 5) Head-to-head goals scored; 6) Head-to-head away goals scored; 7) Goals scored; 8) Away goals scored; 9) Fair-play points (Note: Head-to-head record is used only after all the matches between the teams in question have been played).

==== Results summary ====
Overall								Home						Away					
Pld	W	D	L	GF	GA	GD	Pts	W	D	L	GF	GA	GD	W	D	L	GF	GA	GD
34	12	10	12	53	46	+7	46	7	4	6	34	26	+8	5	6	6	19	20	−1

Source: Ligue 1

==== Results by round ====
Round	1	2	3	4	5	6	7	8	9	10	11	12	13	14	15	16	17	18	19	20	21	22	23	24	25	26	27	28	29	30	31	32	33	34
Ground	H	A	H	A	H	A	H	H	A	H	A	H	H	A	H	A	A	H	A	H	A	H	A	H	A	H	A	A	H	A	H	A	H	A
Result	W	D	D	D	D	D	W	L	L	D	L	L	W	L	L	D	W	W	W	W	W	W	D	L	D	W	L	L	L	W	L	W	D	L
Position	1	3	6	7	8	7	6	8	9	8	11	13	10	12	13	13	10	10	9	9	7	7	7	8	8	8	8	9	10	7	9	8	9	10

Source: Ligue 1
A = Away; H = Home; W = Win; D = Draw; L = Loss

==== Matches ====
The league fixtures were unveiled on 29 June 2023.

13 August 2023 1	Rennes	5–1	Metz	Rennes
17:05 CEST (UTC+2)	Kalimuendo 20'; Gouiri 52'; Doku 67'; Salah 87', 90+4'	Report	Maziz 21'; Kouao (yellow card) 45+2'; Colin (yellow card) 46'	Stadium: Roazhon Park; Attendance: 26,065; Referee: Jérémy Stinat

20 August 2023 2	Lens	1–1	Rennes	Lens
20:45 CEST (UTC+2)	Machado 3'; Abdul Samed (yellow card) 51'; Gradit (yellow card) 79'	Report	Bourigeaud 53' (pen.); Omari (yellow card) 57'	Stadium: Stade Bollaert-Delelis; Attendance: 37,233; Referee: Benoît Millot

27 August 2023 3	Rennes	2–2	Le Havre	Rennes
13:00 CEST (UTC+2)	Blas 10'; Wooh 24'; Matić (yellow card) 75'	Report	Alioui 40', 70'; Grandsir (yellow card) 45+1' (yellow-red card) 62'	Stadium: Roazhon Park; Attendance: 28,311; Referee: Eric Wattelier

2 September 2023 4	Brest	0–0	Rennes	Brest
17:00 CEST (UTC+2)	Del Castillo (yellow card) 27'; Martin (yellow card) 80'; Chardonnet (yellow card) 90+3'	Report	Assignon (yellow card) 74'	Stadium: Stade Francis-Le Blé; Attendance: 15,021; Referee: Hakim Ben El Hadj

16 September 2023 5	Rennes	2–2	Lille	Rennes
17:00 CEST (UTC+2)	Matić (yellow card) 33'; Assignon 74'; Salah 89'	Report	Yazıcı (yellow card) 30'; Yoro 33'; Diakité (yellow card) 51', (goal) 62'; David (yellow card) 86'; Gomes (yellow card) 88'	Stadium: Roazhon Park; Attendance: 28,178; Referee: François Letexier

24 September 2023 6	Montpellier	0–0	Rennes	Montpellier
17:05 CEST (UTC+2)	Chotard (yellow card) 78'; Ferri (yellow card) 90+4'	Report	Yıldırım (yellow card) 32'	Stadium: Stade de la Mosson; Attendance: 15,430; Referee: Stéphanie Frappart

1 October 2023 7	Rennes	3–1	Nantes	Rennes
20:45 CEST (UTC+2)	Bourigeaud 6' (pen.), (yellow card) 58'; Assignon (yellow card) 55'; Matić (yellow card) 63'; D. Doué 73'; Kalimuendo 90+5' (pen.)	Report	Mollet (yellow card) 37'; Chirivella 44', (yellow card) 62'; Moutoussamy (yellow card) 58'; Douglas Augusto (yellow card) 60'; Mohamed (yellow card) 77' (yellow-red card) 77'; Castelletto (yellow card) 87'	Stadium: Roazhon Park; Attendance: 27,316; Referee: Ruddy Buquet

8 October 2023 8	Rennes	1–3	Paris Saint-Germain	Rennes
20:45 CEST (UTC+2)	Omari (yellow card) 42'; Gouiri 56'	Report	Vitinha 32'; Hakimi 36'; Kolo Muani 58'	Stadium: Roazhon Park; Attendance: 27,734; Referee: Benoît Bastien

22 October 2023 9	Lorient	2–1	Rennes	Lorient
13:00 CEST (UTC+2)	Omari 3' (o.g.); Touré 45+2'	Report	Blas 21'; Wooh (yellow card) 48'; Salah (yellow card) 90+2'	Stadium: Stade du Moustoir; Attendance: 16,711; Referee: Gaël Angoula

29 October 2023 10	Rennes	1–1	Strasbourg	Rennes
17:05 CET (UTC+1)	Truffert 23'; Matić (yellow card) 45'; Assignon (yellow card) 61'	Report	Nyamsi (yellow card) 5'; Sels (yellow card) 23'; Mothiba 81'	Stadium: Roazhon Park; Attendance: 28,100; Referee: Florent Batta

5 November 2023 11	Nice	2–0	Rennes	Nice
20:45 CET (UTC+1)	Boga 45'; Ndayishimiye (red card) 75'; Mandanda 87' (o.g.)	Report	Assignon (yellow card) 17'; Truffert (yellow card) 68'; Omari (red card) 85'	Stadium: Allianz Riviera; Attendance: 22,430; Referee: Clément Turpin

12 November 2023 12	Rennes	0–1	Lyon	Rennes
17:05 CET (UTC+1)	G. Doué (red card) 5'; Salah (yellow card) 45'; Theate (yellow card) 75'; Matić (yellow card) 75'	Report	O'Brien 67'; Tagliafico (yellow card) 79'	Stadium: Roazhon Park; Attendance: 28,441; Referee: Stéphanie Frappart

26 November 2023 13	Rennes	3–1	Reims	Rennes
17:05 CET (UTC+1)	Gouiri 4'; Bourigeaud 46'; Theate 66'; Matić (yellow card) 70'; Kalimuendo (yellow card) 78'	Report	O. Diakité 45+1'; Agbadou (yellow card) 85'; Teuma (yellow card) 90'	Stadium: Roazhon Park; Attendance: 27,718; Referee: Ruddy Buquet

3 December 2023 14	Marseille	2–0	Rennes	Marseille
20:45 CET (UTC+1)	Aubameyang 10' (pen.); Ounahi 65'; Ndiaye (red card) 68'; Mughe (yellow card) 81'	Report	Santamaria (yellow card) 36'; Wooh (red card) 61'; Matić (yellow card) 76'; Gouiri (yellow card) 90'	Stadium: Stade Vélodrome; Attendance: 54,162; Referee: Willy Delajod

9 December 2023 15	Rennes	1–2	Monaco	Rennes
17:00 CET (UTC+1)	Omari (yellow card) 38'; Theate (yellow card) 61'; Bourigeaud 90' (pen.)	Report	Camara (yellow card) 13'; Vanderson 51', (yellow card) 54' (yellow-red card) 75'; Salisu (yellow card) 62'; Zakaria (yellow card) 65'; Singo (yellow card) 69'; Fofana 85'	Stadium: Roazhon Park; Attendance: 26,856; Referee: Clément Turpin

17 December 2023 16	Toulouse	0–0	Rennes	Toulouse
15:00 CET (UTC+1)	Dallinga (yellow card) 45'; Costa (yellow card) 51'; Diarra (yellow card) 90+2'	Report	Le Fée (yellow card) 7'; Omari (yellow card) 10'	Stadium: Stadium de Toulouse; Attendance: 23,311; Referee: Jérémy Stinat

20 December 2023 17	Clermont	1–3	Rennes	Clermont-Ferrand
21:00 CET (UTC+1)	Nicholson 4'; Caufriez (red card) 45+2'	Report	Gallon (yellow card) 33'; Kalimuendo 52', (yellow card) 73'; D. Doué 88', (yellow card) 89'; Blas 90+7' (pen.)	Stadium: Stade Gabriel Montpied; Attendance: 8,840; Referee: Eric Wattellier

13 January 2024 18	Rennes	2–0	Nice	Rennes
21:00 CET (UTC+1)	Bourigeaud 31' (pen.); Kalimuendo 54'; Omari (yellow card) 79'	Report		Stadium: Roazhon Park; Attendance: 26,689; Referee: Bastien Dechepy

26 January 2024 19	Lyon	2–3	Rennes	Décines-Charpieu
21:00 CET (UTC+1)	Mata (yellow card) 33'; Henrique 57'; Nuamah (yellow card) 58'; Lacazette 78'	Report	Santamaria (yellow card) 7'; Terrier 22', 41'; D. Doué 36'; Truffert (yellow card) 66'	Stadium: Groupama Stadium; Attendance: 40,516; Referee: Thomas Léonard

3 February 2024 20	Rennes	2–1	Montpellier	Rennes
17:00 CET (UTC+1)	Terrier 3'; Truffert (yellow card) 45+4'; Kalimuendo 48' (pen.), (yellow card) 53'; Yıldırım (yellow card) 80'; Le Fée (yellow card) 86'	Report	Sagnan (yellow card) 12'; Khazri (yellow card) 29'; Mincarelli (yellow card) 47'; Savanier 73'	Stadium: Roazhon Park; Attendance: 24,898; Referee: Mathieu Vernice

11 February 2024 21	Le Havre	0–1	Rennes	Le Havre
13:00 CET (UTC+1)	Touré (yellow card) 36'; Ayew (yellow card) 71'	Report	Bourigeaud 60'; Seidu (yellow card) 79'	Stadium: Stade Océane; Attendance: 22,702; Referee: Benoît Millot

18 February 2024 22	Rennes	3–1	Clermont	Rennes
15:00 CET (UTC+1)	Omari 31'; Blas (penalty missed) 40'; Terrier 58', 64'; Seidu (yellow card) 66'	Report	Matsima 62'; Caufriez (red card) 77'	Stadium: Roazhon Park; Attendance: 27,501; Referee: Romain Lissorgue

25 February 2024 23	Paris Saint-Germain	1–1	Rennes	Paris
17:05 CET (UTC+1)	Hakimi (yellow card) 54'; Hernandez (yellow card) 70'; Ramos (yellow card) 87', (goal) 90+7' (pen.); Fabián (yellow card) 89'; Beraldo (yellow card) 90+5'	Report	Gouiri 33'; D. Doué (yellow card) 48'; Blas (yellow card) 90+2'; Mandanda (yellow card) 90+5'	Stadium: Parc des Princes; Attendance: 47,874; Referee: Bastien Dechepy

3 March 2024 24	Rennes	1–2	Lorient	Rennes
17:05 CET (UTC+1)	Blas (yellow card) 74'; Gouiri 90+4'	Report	Touré (yellow card) 56'; Bamba 59'; Abergel (yellow card) 72'; Kroupi 90'	Stadium: Roazhon Park; Attendance: 28,615; Referee: Benoît Bastien

10 March 2024 25	Lille	2–2	Rennes	Villeneuve d'Ascq
17:05 CET (UTC+1)	Bentaleb (yellow card) 21'; Diakité (yellow card) 26'; Yoro (yellow card) 53'; Gomes (yellow card) 80'; Dago (yellow card) 83'; David 84', 90+2'	Report	Blas 1', (yellow card) 50'; Truffert (yellow card) 8'; Kalimuendo 20'	Stadium: Stade Pierre-Mauroy; Referee: Benoît Millot

17 March 2024 26	Rennes	2–0	Marseille	Rennes
17:05 CET (UTC+1)	Terrier 21'; Kalimuendo (yellow card) 77'; Bourigeaud 78' (pen.)	Report	Harit (yellow card) 38'; López (yellow card) 77'; Sarr (yellow card) 80'	Stadium: Roazhon Park; Attendance: 28,610; Referee: Eric Wattelier

31 March 2024 27	Strasbourg	2–0	Rennes	Strasbourg
17:05 CEST (UTC+2)	Senaya 71'; Sebas 73'; Delaine (yellow card) 76'	Report	Terrier (yellow card) 17'; Matusiwa (yellow card) 24'	Stadium: Stade de la Meinau; Attendance: 25,407; Referee: Hakim Ben El Hadj

7 April 2024 28	Monaco	1–0	Rennes	Monaco
17:05 CEST (UTC+2)	Akliouche 25'; Kehrer (yellow card) 36' (yellow-red card) 64'; Singo (yellow card) 58'	Report	Terrier (red card) 46'; Theate (yellow card) 81'	Stadium: Stade Louis II; Attendance: 6,634; Referee: Stéphanie Frappart

13 April 2024 29	Rennes	1–2	Toulouse	Rennes
21:00 CEST (UTC+2)	D. Doué 20'; Gouiri (yellow card) 60'; Yıldırım (yellow card) 88'; Salah (yellow card) 90+1'	Report	Cásseres 22'; Diarra 32'; Mawissa (yellow card) 34'; Spierings (yellow card) 81'; Restes (yellow card) 88'	Stadium: Roazhon Park; Attendance: 28,055; Referee: Florent Batta

20 April 2024 30	Nantes	0–3	Rennes	Nantes
17:00 CEST (UTC+2)	Chirivella (yellow card) 84'	Report	Wooh (yellow card) 39'; D. Doué (yellow card) 45'; Santamaria (yellow card) 52'; G. Doué (yellow card) 63'; Kalimuendo 67'; Bourigeaud 76' (pen.); Gouiri 90+1'	Stadium: Stade de la Beaujoire; Attendance: 25,433; Referee: Willy Delajod

28 April 2024 31	Rennes	4–5	Brest	Rennes
17:05 CEST (UTC+2)	Kalimuendo 4', 9', (yellow card) 80'; Terrier (yellow card) 45+1', (goal) 79'; Theate 68'; Le Fée (yellow card) 90+6'	Report	Mounié 11'; Omari 47' (o.g.); Satriano 54'; Camara 66'; Lees-Melou (yellow card) 75'; Brassier 90+7'	Stadium: Roazhon Park; Attendance: 28,527; Referee: Benoît Bastien

4 May 2024 32	Metz	2–3	Rennes	Metz
19:00 CEST (UTC+2)	Mikautadze 17', (red card) 90+4'; Diallo 45'; Traoré (yellow card) 71'; Hérelle (yellow card) 75'	Report	Gouiri 22'; Truffert (yellow card) 44'; Bourigeaud 73' (pen.); Theate (yellow card) 75'; Kalimuendo 90+3', (yellow card) 90+4'	Stadium: Stade Saint-Symphorien; Attendance: 23,290; Referee: Ruddy Buquet

12 May 2024 33	Rennes	1–1	Lens	Rennes
21:00 CEST (UTC+2)	Seidu (yellow card) 42'; Salah 82'; Wooh (yellow card) 83'	Report	Costa (yellow card) 21'; Medina (yellow card) 35'; Fulgini 48'; Sotoca (yellow card) 88'	Stadium: Roazhon Park; Attendance: 28,660; Referee: Benoît Millot

19 May 2024 34	Reims	2–1	Rennes	Reims
21:00 CEST (UTC+2)	Abdelhamid 48' (pen.); Akieme 80', (yellow card) 85'	Report	Truffert (yellow card) 85'; Rieder 90+4'	Stadium: Stade Auguste Delaune; Attendance: 16,077; Referee: Mathieu Vernice

=== Coupe de France ===
7 January 2024 Round of 64	Guingamp	0–2	Rennes	Guingamp
14:30 CET (UTC+1)	Roux (yellow card) 66'	Report	Theate (yellow card) 41'; Kalimuendo 45', 57'; Gallon (yellow card) 88'; Yıldırım (yellow card) 90+7'	Stadium: Stade de Roudourou; Attendance: 16,822; Referee: Jérôme Brisard

21 January 2024 Round of 32	Rennes	1–1 (9–8 p)	Marseille	Rennes
21:05 CET (UTC+1)	D. Doué (yellow card) 27'; Bourigeaud (penalty missed) 45+4'; Terrier 53'; Yıldırım (yellow card) 88'	Report	Veretout 29'; Onana (yellow card) 36'; Garcia (yellow card) 45+3'; Vitinha (yellow card) 49'	Stadium: Roazhon Park; Attendance: 28,151; Referee: Jérémie Pignard
	Penalties
	Kalimuendo (penalty scored); Bourigeaud (penalty scored); Santamaria (penalty scored); Le Fée (penalty scored); Blas (penalty scored); Yıldırım (penalty scored); Omari (penalty scored); Belocian (penalty scored); Nagida (penalty scored)		(penalty scored) Veretout; (penalty scored) Balerdi; (penalty scored) Vitinha; (penalty scored) Aubameyang; (penalty scored) Onana; (penalty scored) Luis Henrique; (penalty scored) Clauss; (penalty scored) Garcia; (penalty missed) Gigot

6 February 2024 Round of 16	Sochaux	1–6	Rennes	Montbéliard
20:45 CET (UTC+1)	Viltard 65' (pen.)	Report	Gouiri 24', 47'; Salah 29'; Kalimuendo 35', 41'; Matusiwa (yellow card) 45+2'; Bourigeaud 81'	Stadium: Stade Auguste-Bonal; Attendance: 19,393; Referee: Jérémy Stinat

29 February 2024 Quarter-finals	Le Puy	1–3	Rennes	Saint-Étienne
20:45 CET (UTC+1)	Diakhabi (yellow card) 53'; Adinany 61'; Piechocki (yellow card) 82'	Report	Theate 9'; Bourigeaud 49' (pen.), 82'; Matusiwa (yellow card) 90+1'	Stadium: Stade Geoffroy-Guichard; Attendance: 31,414; Referee: Hakim Ben El Hadj
Note: The match was played at the Stade Geoffroy-Guichard in Saint-Étienne, instead of Le Puy's regular stadium, the Stade Charles Massot in Le Puy-en-Velay, due to capacity limitations.

3 April 2024 Semi-finals	Paris Saint-Germain	1–0	Rennes	Paris
21:10 CEST (UTC+2)	K. Mbappé (penalty missed) 37', 40'; Dembélé (yellow card) 69'	Report	Seidu (yellow card) 81'	Stadium: Parc des Princes; Attendance: 47,879; Referee: Ruddy Buquet

=== UEFA Europa League ===
==== Group stage ====
The draw for the group stage was held on 1 September 2023.

Pos	Team	Pld	W	D	L	GF	GA	GD	Pts	Qualification	VIL	REN	MHA	PAO
1	(Spain) Villarreal	6	4	1	1	9	7	+2	13	Advance to round of 16	—	1–0	0–0	3–2
2	(France) Rennes	6	4	0	2	13	6	+7	12	Advance to knockout round play-offs	2–3	—	3–0	3–1
3	(Israel) Maccabi Haifa	6	1	2	3	3	9	−6	5	Transfer to Europa Conference League	1–2	0–3	—	0–0
4	(Greece) Panathinaikos	6	1	1	4	7	10	−3	4		2–0	1–2	1–2	—

Source: UEFA
Rules for classification: Group stage tiebreakers

21 September 2023 1	Rennes (France)	3–0	(Israel) Maccabi Haifa	Rennes
18:45 CEST (UTC+2)	Blas 1'; Truffert 31'; Yıldırım 55'; Gouiri (yellow card) 79'	Report	Cafumana (yellow card) 59'; Kandil (yellow card) 66'; Chery (yellow card) 79'; Khalaily (yellow card) 79'; Mohamed (yellow card) 89'	Stadium: Roazhon Park; Attendance: 26,838; Referee: Harm Osmers (Germany)

5 October 2023 2	Villarreal (Spain)	1–0	(France) Rennes	Villarreal, Spain
21:00 CEST (UTC+2)	Sørloth 36'; Pino (yellow card) 43'; Moreno (yellow card) 50'; Baena (yellow card) 54'; Pedraza (yellow card) 87'	Report	D. Doué (yellow card) 27'; Truffert (yellow card) 58'; Terrier (penalty missed) 90+2'	Stadium: Estadio de la Cerámica; Attendance: 17,458; Referee: Harald Lechner (Austria)

26 October 2023 3	Panathinaikos (Greece)	1–2	(France) Rennes	Athens, Greece
22:00 EEST (UTC+3)	Bernard (yellow card) 25'; Willian Arão (yellow card) 45'; Ioannidis 61' (pen.)	Report	Gouiri 7'; Belocian (yellow card) 22'; Truffert (yellow card) 45+4'; Kalimuendo 49', (yellow card) 80'; Theate (yellow card) 90+4'; Blas (yellow card) 90+5'	Stadium: Leoforos Alexandras Stadium; Attendance: 13,459; Referee: João Pinheiro (Portugal)

9 November 2023 4	Rennes (France)	3–1	(Greece) Panathinaikos	Rennes
18:45 CET (UTC+1)	Rieder 9'; Belocian (red card) 33'; Bourigeaud (yellow card) 33'; Wooh (yellow card) 55'; Salah 65'; Blas 70' (pen.); Santamaria (yellow card) 81'	Report	Ioannidis 34' (pen.); Vagiannidis (yellow card) 44'; Pérez (yellow card) 52'	Stadium: Roazhon Park; Attendance: 28,004; Referee: Willie Collum (Scotland)

30 November 2023 5	Maccabi Haifa (Israel)	0–3	(France) Rennes	Budapest, Hungary
18:45 CET (UTC+1)	Šimić (yellow card) 16'; Cornud (yellow card) 65'; Kandil (yellow card) 85'	Report	Terrier 29'; Gouiri 47'; Blas (yellow card) 85'; Rieder 90+3'	Stadium: Puskás Aréna; Attendance: 0 Referee: Horațiu Feșnic (Romania)
Note: The match was played behind closed doors at the Puskás Aréna in Budapest, Hungary, instead of Maccabi Haifa's regular stadium, the Sammy Ofer Stadium in Haifa, Israel, as a result of the Gaza war.

14 December 2023 6	Rennes (France)	2–3	(Spain) Villarreal	Rennes
18:45 CET (UTC+1)	Wooh (yellow card) 9'; Bourigeaud (yellow card) 23'; Belocian (yellow card) 34'; Assignon 37'; Mandanda (yellow card) 45+1'; Blas 79'	Report	Albiol (yellow card) 19'; Gerard 36' (pen.), (yellow card) 36'; Akhomach 62'; Parejo 80', (yellow card) 90+1'	Stadium: Roazhon Park; Attendance: 27,761; Referee: Atilla Karaoğlan (Turkey)

==== Knockout phase ====
===== Knockout round play-offs =====
The draw for the knockout round play-offs was held on 18 December 2023.

15 February 2024 First leg	Milan (Italy)	3–0	(France) Rennes	Milan, Italy
21:00 CET (UTC+1)	Loftus-Cheek 32', 47'; Leão 53'	Report	Nagida (yellow card) 87'	Stadium: San Siro; Attendance: 69,021; Referee: Nikola Dabanović (Montenegro)

22 February 2024 Second leg	Rennes (France)	3–2 (3–5 agg.)	(Italy) Milan	Rennes
18:45 CET (UTC+1)	Bourigeaud 11', 54' (pen.), 68' (pen.); Gouiri (yellow card) 69'	Report	Jović 22'; Kjær (yellow card) 53'; Leão 58'; Maignan (yellow card) 79'	Stadium: Roazhon Park; Attendance: 28,320; Referee: João Pinheiro (Portugal)

== Statistics ==
=== Goalscorers ===
Position	Players	Ligue 1	Coupe de France	Europa League	Total
MF	(France) Benjamin Bourigeaud	9	3	3	15
FW	(France) Arnaud Kalimuendo	10	4	1	15
FW	(Algeria) Amine Gouiri	7	2	2	11
FW	(France) Martin Terrier	7	1	1	9
MF	(France) Ludovic Blas	4	0	3	7
FW	(Morocco) Ibrahim Salah	4	1	1	6
MF	(France) Désiré Doué	4	0	0	4
MF	(Switzerland) Fabian Rieder	1	0	2	3
DF	(Belgium) Arthur Theate	2	1	0	3
DF	(France) Adrien Truffert	1	0	1	2
DF	(France) Lorenz Assignon	0	0	1	1
DF	(France) Warmed Omari	1	0	0	1
DF	(Cameroon) Christopher Wooh	1	0	0	1
FW	(Turkey) Bertuğ Yıldırım	0	0	1	1
