= Belocian =

Belocian is a surname. Notable people with the surname include:

- Jeanuël Belocian (born 2005), French football player from Guadeloupe
- Wilhem Belocian (born 1995), French hurdler and sprinter from Guadeloupe
