= Christopher Wooh =

Cameroonian footballer (born 2001)

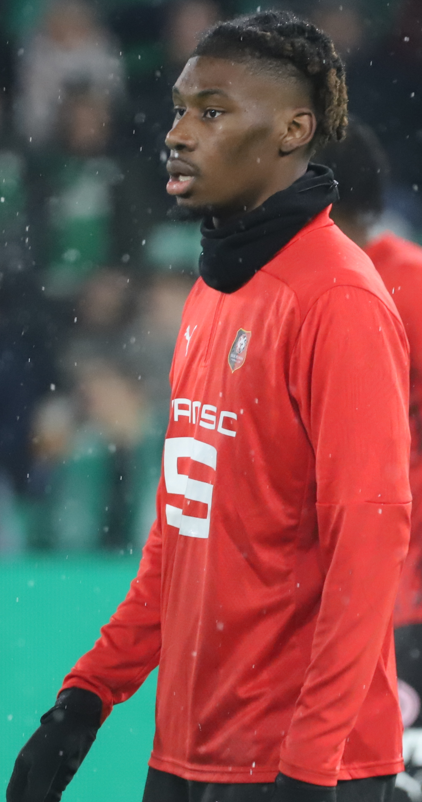
- Wooh with Rennes in 2025

Personal information
- Full name: Christopher Maurice Wooh
- Date of birth: 18 September 2001 (age 25)
- Place of birth: Louvres, France
- Height: 1.91 m (6 ft 3 in)
- Position: Defender

Team information
- Current team: Spartak Moscow
- Number: 3

Youth career
- 2007–2010: Puiseux Louvres
- 2010–2016: Chantilly
- 2016–2018: Nancy

Senior career*
Years	Team	Apps	(Gls)
2018–2021	Nancy II	9	(0)
2021	Nancy	13	(2)
2021–2022	Lens II	5	(2)
2021–2022	Lens	15	(0)
2022–2025	Rennes	53	(1)
2025–	Spartak Moscow	30	(3)

International career^{‡}
2022–	Cameroon	25	(2)
- * Club domestic league appearances and goals as of 22 November 2026 ‡ National team caps and goals as of 4 January 2026

Christopher Maurice Wooh (born 18 September 2001) is a professional footballer who plays as a defender for Russian club Spartak Moscow. Born in France, he plays for the Cameroon national team.

== Club career ==
=== Nancy ===
Wooh is a youth product of Puiseux Louvres, Chantilly and Nancy. He made his professional debut with Nancy in a 1–0 Coupe de France loss to Sochaux on 20 January 2021.

=== Lens ===
On 1 June 2021, Wooh agreed to a four-year contract with Ligue 1 club Lens, effective from 1 July.

=== Rennes ===
On 31 August 2022, Wooh signed to a four-year contract with Rennes.

=== Spartak Moscow ===
On 5 September 2025, Wooh joined Russian Premier League club Spartak Moscow on a four-season deal.

== International career ==
Born in France, Wooh holds French and Cameroonian nationalities. In 2022, he was selected by Rigobert Song to represent the Cameroon national team for the first time in his career, for the upcoming matchups of the Africa Cup 2023. He debuted with them in a 1–0 2023 Africa Cup of Nations qualification win over Burundi on 9 June 2022.

== Career statistics ==
=== Club ===
As of match played 22 November 2026

Appearances and goals by club, season and competition
Club	Season	League			National cup		Europe		Other		Total	
Club	Season	Division	Apps	Goals	Apps	Goals	Apps	Goals	Apps	Goals	Apps	Goals
Nancy II	2018–19	National 3	7	0	—		—		—		7	0
Nancy II	2020–21	National 3	2	0	—		—		—		2	0
Nancy II	Total		9	0	—		—		—		9	0
Nancy	2020–21	Ligue 2	13	2	1	0	—		—		14	2
Lens II	2021–22	CFA 2	5	2	—		—		—		5	2
Lens	2021–22	Ligue 1	14	0	2	0	—		—		16	0
Lens	2022–23	Ligue 1	1	0	0	0	—		—		1	0
Lens	Total		15	0	2	0	—		—		17	0
Rennes	2022–23	Ligue 1	13	0	2	0	1 (Note: Appearance(s) in UEFA Europa League)	1	—		16	1
Rennes	2023–24	Ligue 1	18	1	0	0	3	0	—		21	1
Rennes	2024–25	Ligue 1	20	0	1	0	—		—		21	0
Rennes	2025–26	Ligue 1	2	0	0	0	—		—		2	0
Rennes	Total		53	1	3	0	4	1	—		60	2
Spartak Moscow	2025–26	Russian Premier League	19	2	9	1	—		—		28	3
Spartak Moscow	2026–27	Russian Premier League	11	1	5	0	—		1 (Note: Appearance in Russian Super Cup)	0	17	1
Spartak Moscow	Total		30	3	14	1	—		1	0	45	4
Career total			125	8	20	1	4	1	1	0	150	10

=== International ===
As of match played 4 January 2026

Appearances and goals by national team and year
National team	Year	Apps	Goals
Cameroon	2022	4	0
Cameroon	2023	4	1
Cameroon	2024	12	1
Cameroon	2025	4	0
Cameroon	2026	1	0
Total		25	2

== Honours ==
Spartak Moscow

- Russian Cup: 2025–26
