= Warmed Omari =

Footballer (born 2000)

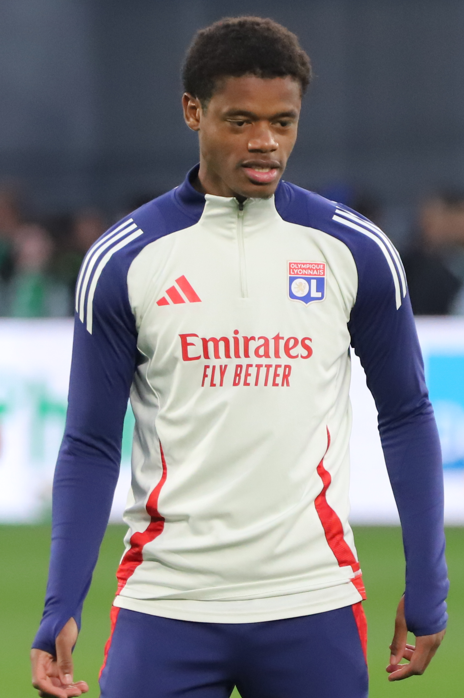
- Omari with Lyon in 2025

Personal information
- Date of birth: 23 April 2000 (age 26)
- Place of birth: Bandraboua, Mayotte, France
- Height: 1.85 m (6 ft 1 in)
- Position: Centre-back

Team information
- Current team: Hamburger SV
- Number: 17

Youth career
- 2008–2010: JSCG Football
- 2010–2012: US Méenne
- 2012–2014: TA Rennes
- 2014–2018: Rennes

Senior career*
Years	Team	Apps	(Gls)
2018–2021	Rennes II	19	(0)
2021–2026	Rennes	75	(1)
2024–2025	→ Lyon (loan)	1	(0)
2025–2026	→ Hamburger SV (loan)	6	(0)
2026–	Hamburger SV	20	(0)

International career^{‡}
2022	France U21	2	(0)
2024–	Comoros	17	(1)
- * Club domestic league appearances and goals as of 1 November 2026 ‡ National team caps and goals as of 17 November 2026

Warmed Omari (born 23 April 2000) is a professional footballer who plays as a centre-back for Bundesliga club Hamburger SV. Born in Mayotte, France, he plays for the Comoros national team.

== Club career ==
=== Rennes ===
Omari is a youth academy graduate of Rennes. On 9 June 2020, he signed his first professional contract with the club. He signed a three-year contract extension on 27 April 2021, which tied him to the club until June 2024.

On 15 August 2021, Omari made his professional debut in a 1–1 league draw against Brest. He scored his first goal for Rennes on 18 December 2021 in a 1–0 cup win over Lorient. On 14 September 2023, he signed a contract extension with the club until June 2027.

==== Loan to Lyon ====
On 30 August 2024, Omari joined fellow Ligue 1 club Lyon on loan until the end of the season.

=== Hamburger SV ===
On 7 August 2025, Omari moved to Bundesliga club Hamburger SV on a one-year loan. On 3 February 2026, the club prematurely activated the option-to-buy clause agreed in the initial loan deal.

== International career ==
Omari has represented France at the under-21 level. In August 2024, he received his first call-up to the Comoros national team. He made his debut for Comoros on 4 September 2024 in a 1–1 draw against Gambia. He scored his first goal on 24 September 2026 in a 3–1 defeat to Cameroon.

== Personal life ==
Born in Mayotte, Omari is eligible to represent both France and Comoros in international football.

== Career statistics ==
=== Club ===
As of match played 1 November 2026

Appearances and goals by club, season and competition
Club	Season	League			National cup (Note: Includes Coupe de France, DFB-Pokal)		Continental		Total	
Club	Season	Division	Apps	Goals	Apps	Goals	Apps	Goals	Apps	Goals
Rennes II	2018–19	Championnat National 3	2	0	—		—		2	0
Rennes II	2019–20	Championnat National 3	14	0	—		—		14	0
Rennes II	2020–21	Championnat National 3	3	0	—		—		3	0
Rennes II	Total		19	0	0	0	0	0	19	0
Rennes	2021–22	Ligue 1	34	0	1	1	5 (Note: Appearances in UEFA Europa Conference League)	0	40	1
Rennes	2022–23	Ligue 1	16	0	0	0	2 (Note: Appearances in UEFA Europa League)	0	18	0
Rennes	2023–24	Ligue 1	25	1	5	0	6	0	36	1
Rennes	2024–25	Ligue 1	0	0	0	0	—		0	0
Rennes	2025–26	Ligue 1	0	0	0	0	—		0	0
Rennes	Total		75	1	6	1	13	0	94	2
Lyon (loan)	2024–25	Ligue 1	1	0	1	0	2	0	4	0
Hamburger SV (loan)	2025–26	Bundesliga	6	0	1	0	—		7	0
Hamburger SV	2025–26	Bundesliga	14	0	0	0	—		14	0
Hamburger SV	2026–27	Bundesliga	6	0	1	0	—		7	0
Hamburger SV	Total		26	0	2	0	0	0	28	0
Career total			121	1	9	1	15	0	145	2

=== International ===
As of match played 17 November 2026

Appearances and goals by national team and year
National team	Year	Apps	Goals
Comoros	2024	6	0
Comoros	2025	5	0
Comoros	2026	6	1
Total		17	1

Scores and results list Comoros' goal tally first, score column indicates score after each Omari goal.

List of international goals scored by Warmed Omari
No.	Date	Venue	Opponent	Score	Result	Competition
1	24 September 2026	Roumdé Adjia Stadium, Garoua, Cameroon	Cameroon	1–2	1–3	2027 Africa Cup of Nations qualification
