= Mikayil Faye =

Senegalese association football player

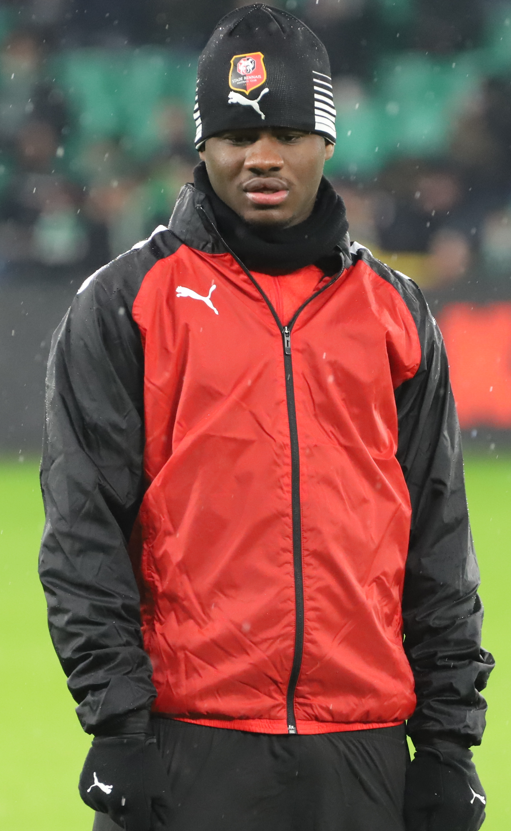
- Mikayil Faye with Rennes in 2025

Personal information
- Full name: Mikayil Ngor Faye
- Date of birth: 14 July 2004 (age 22)
- Place of birth: Sédhiou, Senegal
- Height: 1.86 m (6 ft 1 in)
- Position: Centre-back

Team information
- Current team: 1. FC Nürnberg; (on loan from Rennes)
- Number: 15

Youth career
- 2019–2022: Diambars

Senior career*
Years	Team	Apps	(Gls)
2022–2023	Kustošija	14	(1)
2023–2024	Barcelona B	35	(4)
2024–	Rennes	11	(0)
2025–2026	→ Cremonese (loan)	8	(0)
2026–	→ 1. FC Nürnberg (loan)	0	(0)

International career^{‡}
2019–2021	Senegal U17	10	(0)
2024–	Senegal	1	(1)
- * Club domestic league appearances and goals as of 25 May 2026 ‡ National team caps and goals as of 21:35, 28 May 2024 (UTC)

Mikayil Ngor "Mika" Faye (born 14 July 2004) is a Senegalese professional footballer who plays as a centre-back for 2. Bundesliga club 1. FC Nürnberg, on loan from Ligue 1 club Rennes, and the Senegal national team.

== Club career ==
=== Early career ===
A left-sided centre-back, Faye was a product of the Diambars FC Academy in Senegal with Bamba Dieng. Also capable of playing at left-back, he was linked to Olympique de Marseille, and Stade de Reims, and trained with Dinamo Zagreb.

=== NK Kustošija ===
Faye made his debut for NK Kustošija in the Prva NL on the 8 March 2023 against HNK Orijent. He scored his first league goal on 22 May 2023 against NK Hrvatski Dragovoljac.

=== Barcelona ===
On 19 June 2023 he joined Barcelona Atlètic. He signed an agreement till June 2027 and was handed number 15. On 3 September 2023 he made his official Barcelona Atlètic debut against Real Unión, forming a centre-back duo with teammate Pelayo Fernández.

=== Rennes ===
On 25 August 2024, Faye moved to Ligue 1 side Rennes, signing a four-year deal.

On 23 July 2026, Faye moved on loan to 1. FC Nürnberg in German 2. Bundesliga.

== International career ==
Faye reached the round of 16 of the 2019 FIFA U-17 World Cup with Senegal U17. In 2021, he was called up by Youssouph Dabo to the Senegal national under-20 football team for U-20 Africa Cup of Nations qualifiers, although he did not feature in any matches.

He scored on his senior debut for Senegal on 22 March 2024, in a friendly match against Gabon.

== Career statistics ==
=== Club ===
As of match played 23 June 2024

Appearances and goals by club, season and competition
Club	Season	League			Cup		Other		Total	
Club	Season	Division	Apps	Goals	Apps	Goals	Apps	Goals	Apps	Goals
Kustošija	2022–23	Prva NL	13	1	—		1	0	14	1
Barcelona Atlètic	2023–24	Primera Federación	33	4	—		2 (Note: Appearances in 2024 Primera Federación play-offs)	0	35	4
Rennes	2024–25	Ligue 1	0	0	0	0	0	—		0
Career total			46	5	0	0	3	0	49	5

=== International ===
As of match played 22 March 2024

Appearances and goals by national team and year
National team	Year	Apps	Goals
Senegal	2024	1	1
Total		1	1

As of match played 22 March 2024
Senegal score listed first, score column indicates score after each Faye goal

List of international goals scored by Mikayil Faye
No.	Date	Venue	Cap	Opponent	Score	Result	Competition
1	22 March 2024	Stade de la Licorne, Amiens, France	1	Gabon	2–0	3–0	Friendly
