= Jérémy Jacquet =

French footballer (born 2005)

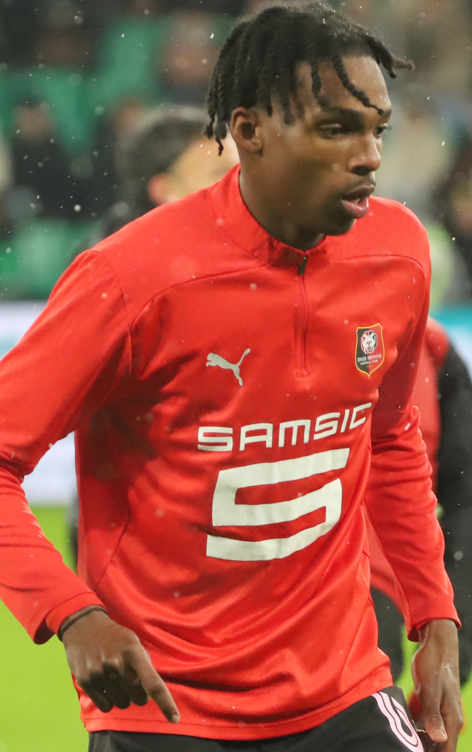
- Jacquet with Rennes in 2025

Personal information
- Full name: Jérémy Jacquet
- Date of birth: 13 July 2005 (age 21)
- Place of birth: Bondy, France
- Height: 1.90 m (6 ft 3 in)
- Position: Centre-back

Team information
- Current team: Liverpool
- Number: 5

Youth career
- 2011–2013: AS Outre Mer du Bois l'Abbé
- 2013–2019: RC Joinville
- 2019–2022: Rennes

Senior career*
Years	Team	Apps	(Gls)
2022–2024	Rennes B	31	(3)
2024–2026	Rennes	31	(0)
2024–2025	→ Clermont (loan)	23	(2)
2026–	Liverpool	11	(0)

International career^{‡}
2022	France U17	1	(0)
2022–2023	France U18	9	(0)
2023–2024	France U19	14	(2)
2024	France U20	2	(1)
2025–	France U21	5	(0)
2026–	France	4	(0)
Medal record
Men's football
Representing France
UEFA European Under-19 Championship
Runner-up	2024 Northern Ireland
- * Club domestic league appearances and goals as of 22 November 2026 ‡ National team caps and goals as of 15 November 2026

Jérémy Jacquet (Note: French pronunciation: [ʒeʁemi ʒakɛ]) (born 13 July 2005) is a French professional footballer who plays as a centre-back for Premier League club Liverpool and the France national team.

== Early life ==
Jérémy Jacquet was born on 13 July 2005 in Bondy, a northeastern suburb of Paris, France. He is of Guadeloupean descent.

He spent his youth career at AS Outre Mer du Bois l'Abbé in Champigny-sur-Marne and RC Joinville in Joinville-le-Pont, both Parisian suburbs, before joining Rennes in 2019. He started his senior career with Rennes B in 2022.

== Club career ==
=== Rennes ===
On 13 January 2024, Jacquet made his professional debut for Rennes in a 2–0 victory against Nice, coming off the bench in the 86th minute. A few weeks later, he joined fellow Ligue 1 side Clermont Foot on loan for the rest of the season. His loan was extended after the end of the season, and he continued with Clermont Foot for the 2024–25 season, now playing in Ligue 2. However, his loan was cancelled and he was recalled by Rennes in February 2025, with his parent club reportedly having to pay €900,000 to end the loan early. On 26 May 2025, he extended his contract with Rennes until 2029.

=== Liverpool ===
On 2 February 2026, Jacquet agreed to join Liverpool in the summer under a pre‑contract deal, with the transfer fee reported at £55 million plus £5 million in add-ons. He made his debut for Liverpool in a 2–2 draw with Newcastle United at St James' Park on 23 August, in the club's first game of the 2026–27 Premier League season.

== International career ==
Jacquet has played for France at many youth international levels. He was named in the UEFA European Under-19 Championship Team of the Tournament in 2024, where France lost in the final to Spain.

Jacquet was one of the 23 players who were called up to the senior French national team by head coach Zinedine Zidane for the UEFA Nations League matches against Turkey, Belgium and Italy during September and October 2026. He went on to make his senior international debut on 28 September, playing the entire match in a 1–0 victory over Belgium at Stade Roi Baudouin.

== Career statistics ==
=== Club ===
As of match played 22 November 2026

Appearances and goals by club, season and competition
Club	Season	League			National cup (Note: Includes Coupe de France)		League cup (Note: Includes EFL Cup)		Europe		Total	
Club	Season	Division	Apps	Goals	Apps	Goals	Apps	Goals	Apps	Goals	Apps	Goals
Rennes B	2021–22	National 3	2	0	—		—		—		2	0
Rennes B	2022–23	CFA 2	20	3	—		—		—		20	3
Rennes B	2023–24	National 3	9	0	—		—		—		9	0
Rennes B	Total		31	3	—		—		—		31	3
Rennes	2023–24	Ligue 1	1	0	0	0	—		—		1	0
Rennes	2024–25	Ligue 1	11	0	—		—		—		11	0
Rennes	2025–26	Ligue 1	19	0	2	0	—		—		21	0
Rennes	Total		31	0	2	0	—		—		33	0
Clermont (loan)	2023–24	Ligue 1	6	0	—		—		—		6	0
Clermont (loan)	2024–25	Ligue 2	17	2	1	0	—		—		18	2
Clermont (loan)	Total		23	2	1	0	—		—		24	2
Liverpool	2026–27	Premier League	11	0	0	0	2	0	4 (Note: Appearances in UEFA Champions League)	0	17	0
Career total			96	5	3	0	2	0	4	0	105	5

=== International ===
As of match played 15 November 2026

Appearances and goals by national team and year
National team	Year	Apps	Goals
France	2026	4	0
Total		4	0

== Honours ==
France U19

- UEFA European Under-19 Championship runner-up: 2024

Individual

- UEFA European Under-19 Championship Team of the Tournament: 2024
