= 2022–23 Stade Rennais FC season =

Stade Rennais F.C.
2022–23 season
- President: Nicolas Holveck
- Head coach: Bruno Génésio
- Stadium: Roazhon Park
- Ligue 1: 4th
- Coupe de France: Round of 32
- UEFA Europa League: Knockout round play-offs
- Top goalscorer: League: Amine Gouiri (15); All: Amine Gouiri (17)
Home colours	Away colours	Third colours

The 2022–23 season was the 121st season in the history of Stade Rennais F.C. and their 29th consecutive season in the top flight. The club participated in Ligue 1, the Coupe de France, and the UEFA Europa League.

== Players ==
=== First-team squad ===
As of 1 February 2023

Note: Flags indicate national team as defined under FIFA eligibility rules; some limited exceptions apply. Players may hold more than one non-FIFA nationality.

No.	Pos.	Nation	Player
1	GK	TUR	Doğan Alemdar
2	DF	WAL	Joe Rodon (on loan from Tottenham Hotspur)
3	DF	FRA	Adrien Truffert
5	DF	BEL	Arthur Theate
6	MF	FRA	Lesley Ugochukwu
7	FW	FRA	Martin Terrier
8	MF	FRA	Baptiste Santamaria
9	FW	FRA	Arnaud Kalimuendo
10	FW	BEL	Jérémy Doku
14	MF	FRA	Benjamin Bourigeaud (vice-captain)
15	DF	CMR	Christopher Wooh
17	FW	CMR	Karl Toko Ekambi (on loan from Lyon)
18	DF	FRA	Jeanuël Belocian
19	FW	FRA	Amine Gouiri
20	MF	FRA	Flavien Tait

No.	Pos.	Nation	Player
21	MF	CRO	Lovro Majer
22	DF	FRA	Lorenz Assignon
23	DF	FRA	Warmed Omari
25	DF	NOR	Birger Meling
27	DF	MLI	Hamari Traoré (captain)
30	GK	FRA	Steve Mandanda
31	DF	CIV	Guéla Doué
33	MF	FRA	Désiré Doué
34	FW	MAR	Ibrahim Salah
39	GK	TUN	Elias Damergy
41	FW	GAB	Alan Do Marcolino
80	MF	POR	Xeka
89	GK	FRA	Romain Salin
90	DF	ENG	Djed Spence (on loan from Tottenham Hotspur)

=== Out on loan ===
Note: Flags indicate national team as defined under FIFA eligibility rules; some limited exceptions apply. Players may hold more than one non-FIFA nationality.

No.	Pos.	Nation	Player
—	GK	SEN	Alfred Gomis (at Como)
—	DF	FRA	Loïc Badé (at Sevilla)
—	FW	FRA	Matthis Abline (at Auxerre)
—	FW	FRA	Andy Diouf (at Basel)

No.	Pos.	Nation	Player
—	FW	GUI	Serhou Guirassy (at VfB Stuttgart)
—	FW	FRA	Junior Kadile (at Famalicão)
—	FW	FRA	Loum Tchaouna (at Dijon)

== Transfers ==
=== In ===
Pos.	Player	Transferred from	Fee	Date	Source
GK	(France) Steve Mandanda	(France) Marseille	Free	6 July 2022	
DF	(Belgium) Arthur Theate	(Italy) Bologna	€20M	29 July 2022	
DF	(Wales) Joe Rodon	(England) Tottenham Hotspur	Loan	1 August 2022	
FW	(France) Arnaud Kalimuendo	(France) Paris Saint-Germain	€25M (Note: Bonuses included.)	11 August 2022	
FW	(France) Amine Gouiri	(France) Nice	€25M	1 September 2022	
DF	(Cameroon) Christopher Wooh	(France) Lens	€9M	1 September 2022	
MF	(Portugal) Xeka	(France) Lille	Free	21 September 2022	
FW	(Cameroon) Karl Toko Ekambi	(France) Lyon	Loan	26 January 2023	
DF	(England) Djed Spence	(England) Tottenham Hotspur	Loan	31 January 2023	
FW	(Belgium) Ibrahim Salah	(Belgium) Gent	€3M	1 February 2023	

=== Out ===
Pos.	Player	Transferred to	Fee	Date	Source
DF	(Morocco) Nayef Aguerd	(England) West Ham United	€35M	20 June 2022	
GK	(Democratic Republic of the Congo) Pépé Bonet	(France) Red Star	Free	22 June 2022	
DF	(France) Jonas Martin	(France) Lille	Free	1 July 2022	
DF	(France) Jérémy Gelin	(France) Amiens	Free	7 July 2022	
FW	(France) Andy Diouf	(Switzerland) Basel	Loan	18 July 2022	
FW	(Cameroon) James Léa Siliki	(Portugal) Estoril	Free	22 July 2022	
FW	(Turkey) Metehan Güçlü	(Netherlands) Emmen	Free	22 July 2022	
FW	(France) Mathys Tel	(Germany) Bayern Munich	€20M	25 July 2022	
MF	(France) Yann Gboho	(Belgium) Cercle Brugge	Free	19 August 2022	
DF	(France) Loïc Badé	(England) Nottingham Forest	Loan	1 September 2022	
FW	(France) Gaëtan Laborde	(France) Nice	€15M	1 September 2022	
FW	(Guinea) Serhou Guirassy	(Germany) VfB Stuttgart	Loan	1 September 2022	
DF	(France) Loïc Badé	(Spain) Sevilla	Loan	4 January 2023	
FW	(Ghana) Kamaldeen Sulemana	(England) Southampton	€25M	1 February 2023	

== Pre-season and friendlies ==
Win Draw Loss

16 July 2022 Friendly	SC Freiburg	1–0	Rennes	Freiburg, Germany
17:30 CEST (UTC+2)	Gregoritsch 71'	Report		Stadium: Europa-Park Stadion; Attendance: 13,000

20 July 2022 Friendly	Caen	1–2	Rennes	Caen
19:00 CEST (UTC+2)	Kyeremeh 90'	Report	Terrier 39'; Thomas 41' (o.g.); Assignon (yellow card) 85'	Stadium: Stade Michel d'Ornano

23 July 2022 Friendly	FC Augsburg	2–3	Rennes	Augsburg, Germany
15:30 CEST (UTC+2)	Demirović 22'; Malone 117'	Report	Bourigeaud 5'; Laborde 54'; Uduokhai 56' (o.g.)	Stadium: WWK Arena; Attendance: 6,500
Note: Match was played in four 30-minute periods.

27 July 2022 Friendly	Nantes	0–1	Rennes	Saint-Nazaire
17:00 CEST (UTC+2)		Report	Guirassy 49'	Stadium: Stade Léo Lagrange; Attendance: 4,000

30 July 2022 Friendly	Rennes	1–2	Aston Villa	Rennes
18:00 CEST (UTC+2)	Theate 7'; Belocian (yellow card) 77'	Report	Bailey 14'; Douglas Luiz (yellow card) 59'; Diego Carlos 81'; Iroegbunam (yellow card) 90+2'	Stadium: Roazhon Park; Attendance: 19,706; Referee: Willy Delajod (France)

10 December 2022 Friendly	Rennes	4–3	Celtic	Portugal
--:-- WET (UTC±0)	Terrier 1'; Gouiri 20'; Assignon 27'; Omari 38'	Report	O'Riley 18', 44'; Furuhashi 40'	Attendance: 0

16 December 2022 Friendly	Rennes	2–1	Feyenoord	Portugal
--:-- WET (UTC±0)	Kalimuendo 6'; Abline 80' (pen.)	Report	Kökçü 13'	Attendance: 0

== Competitions ==
=== Overall record ===
Competition	First match	Last match	Starting round	Final position	Record							
Competition	First match	Last match	Starting round	Final position	Pld	W	D	L	GF	GA	GD	Win %
Ligue 1	7 August 2022	3 June 2023	Matchday 1	4th	38	21	5	12	69	39	+30	55.26
Coupe de France	7 January 2022	20 January 2023	Round of 64	Round of 32	2	1	0	1	2	2	+0	50.00
UEFA Europa League	8 September 2022	23 February 2023	Group stage	Knockout round play-offs	8	4	3	1	14	11	+3	50.00
Total					48	26	8	14	85	52	+33	54.17

Source: Soccerway

=== Ligue 1 ===
==== League table ====
Pos	Team	Pld	W	D	L	GF	GA	GD	Pts	Qualification or relegation
2	Lens	38	25	9	4	68	29	+39	84	Qualification for the Champions League group stage
3	Marseille	38	22	7	9	67	40	+27	73	Qualification for the Champions League third qualifying round
4	Rennes	38	21	5	12	69	39	+30	68	Qualification for the Europa League group stage
5	Lille	38	19	10	9	65	44	+21	67	Qualification for the Europa Conference League play-off round
6	Monaco	38	19	8	11	70	58	+12	65	

Source: Ligue 1
Rules for classification: 1) Points; 2) Goal difference; 3) Head-to-head points; 4) Head-to-head goal difference; 5) Head-to-head goals scored; 6) Head-to-head away goals scored; 7) Goals scored; 8) Away goals scored; 9) Fair-play points (Note: Head-to-head record is used only after all the matches between the teams in question have been played).

==== Results summary ====
Overall								Home						Away					
Pld	W	D	L	GF	GA	GD	Pts	W	D	L	GF	GA	GD	W	D	L	GF	GA	GD
38	21	5	12	69	39	+30	68	15	0	4	43	14	+29	6	5	8	26	25	+1

Source: Ligue 1

==== Results by round ====
Round	1	2	3	4	5	6	7	8	9	10	11	12	13	14	15	16	17	18	19	20	21	22	23	24	25	26	27	28	29	30	31	32	33	34	35	36	37	38
Ground	H	A	H	A	H	A	H	A	A	H	H	A	H	A	H	A	H	A	H	A	H	H	A	H	A	H	A	A	H	A	H	A	H	A	H	A	H	A
Result	L	D	W	L	W	D	W	D	W	W	W	W	W	D	W	L	W	L	W	L	W	L	L	W	W	L	D	W	L	L	W	L	W	L	W	W	W	W
Position	17	16	9	13	6	9	6	8	6	6	5	4	3	3	3	4	4	4	5	5	5	5	6	5	5	5	5	5	6	6	6	6	6	6	6	6	5	4

Source: Ligue 1
A = Away; H = Home; W = Win; D = Draw; L = Loss

==== Matches ====
The league fixtures were announced on 17 June 2022.

7 August 2022 1	Rennes	0–1	Lorient	Rennes
17:05 CEST (UTC+2)	Truffert (yellow card) 62'; Theate (yellow card) 87'; Traoré (yellow card) 87'	Report	Theate 65' (o.g.); Le Goff (yellow card) 75'	Stadium: Roazhon Park; Attendance: 28,177; Referee: Bastien Dechepy

13 August 2022 2	Monaco	1–1	Rennes	Monaco
17:00 CEST (UTC+2)	Fofana (red card) 15'; Disasi (penalty missed) 33'; Embolo 72'	Report	Rodon (yellow card) 21'; Theate (yellow card) 23'; Mandanda (yellow card) 31'; Laborde 59'	Stadium: Stade Louis II; Attendance: 8,000; Referee: Jérémie Pignard

21 August 2022 3	Rennes	2–1	Ajaccio	Rennes
17:05 CEST (UTC+2)	Terrier 18'; Badé (yellow card) 45+1'; Theate 62'; Santamaria (yellow card) 82'; D. Doué (yellow card) 86'; Ugochukwu (red card) 90+1'	Report	El Idrissy (yellow card) 45+4', (goal) 57'; Mayembo (yellow card) 79'	Stadium: Roazhon Park; Attendance: 27,592; Referee: Hakim Ben El Hadj

27 August 2022 4	Lens	2–1	Rennes	Lens
21:00 CEST (UTC+2)	Fofana 65'; Openda 69'	Report	D. Doué (yellow card) 43'; Laborde 90'	Stadium: Stade Bollaert-Delelis; Attendance: 37,848; Referee: Jérôme Brisard

31 August 2022 5	Rennes	3–1	Brest	Rennes
21:00 CEST (UTC+2)	Rodon 53'; Assignon (yellow card) 61'; Tait (yellow card) 86'; Terrier 89'; D. Doué 90+1'	Report	Honorat 57'	Stadium: Roazhon Park; Attendance: 27,392; Referee: Benoît Millot

4 September 2022 6	Troyes	1–1	Rennes	Troyes
17:05 CEST (UTC+2)	Ugbo 14'; Salmier (red card) 27'; Chavalerin (yellow card) 72'; Gallon (yellow card) 90+1'	Report	Santamaria (yellow card) 42', (goal) 48'; Meling (yellow card) 71'	Stadium: Stade de l'Aube; Attendance: 8,000; Referee: Mathieu Vernice

11 September 2022 7	Rennes	5–0	Auxerre	Rennes
17:05 CEST (UTC+2)	Sulemana 3'; Rodon (yellow card) 28'; Gouiri 60'; Terrier 68'; Tait 79'; Abline 85'	Report	Sakhi (yellow card) 82'	Stadium: Roazhon Park; Attendance: 27,837; Referee: Thomas Léonard

18 September 2022 8	Marseille	1–1	Rennes	Marseille
15:00 CEST (UTC+2)	Guendouzi 52'; Tavares (yellow card) 62'; Balerdi (yellow card) 85'; Suárez (yellow card) 90'	Report	Traoré (yellow card) 7'; D. Doué (yellow card) 19'; Guendouzi 25' (o.g.); Gouiri (yellow card) 44'; Sulemana (yellow card) 68'	Stadium: Stade Vélodrome; Attendance: 62,753; Referee: Benoît Bastien

1 October 2022 9	Strasbourg	1–3	Rennes	Strasbourg
17:00 CEST (UTC+2)	Nyamsi (red card) 28'; Diallo 72' (pen.)	Report	Kalimuendo 38'; Terrier 49'; Gouiri 61'; Traoré (yellow card) 71'; Majer (yellow card) 90'	Stadium: Stade de la Meinau; Attendance: 25,226; Referee: Eric Wattellier

9 October 2022 10	Rennes	3–0	Nantes	Rennes
17:05 CEST (UTC+2)	Gouiri 26'; Traoré (yellow card) 61'; Terrier 79'; D. Doué 84'; Rodon (red card) 88'	Report		Stadium: Roazhon Park; Attendance: 27,844; Referee: Florent Batta

16 October 2022 11	Rennes	3–2	Lyon	Rennes
15:00 CEST (UTC+2)	Xeka (yellow card) 1'; Assignon (yellow card) 33'; Terrier 38', 77'; Gouiri 47'	Report	Tolisso (yellow card) 6'; Lacazette 22', 71'; Aouar (yellow card) 70'	Stadium: Roazhon Park; Attendance: 28,152; Referee: Stéphanie Frappart

23 October 2022 12	Angers	1–2	Rennes	Angers
13:00 CEST (UTC+2)	Salama 53'; Valery (yellow card) 55'; Amadou (yellow card) 90+1'	Report	Gouiri 43'; Tait (yellow card) 57'; Theate (yellow card) 75'; Majer 90+3' (pen.)	Stadium: Stade Raymond Kopa; Attendance: 11,240; Referee: Pierre Gaillouste

30 October 2022 13	Rennes	3–0	Montpellier	Rennes
15:00 CET (UTC+1)	Terrier 15'; Kalimuendo 23'; Majer (yellow card) 84'; Gouiri 85'	Report	Cozza (yellow card) 23'; Chotard (yellow card) 72'	Stadium: Roazhon Park; Attendance: 25,617; Referee: Bastien Dechepy

6 November 2022 14	Lille	1–1	Rennes	Villeneuve-d'Ascq
17:05 CET (UTC+1)	Fonte 16'; Djaló (yellow card) 54'; Bamba (yellow card) 57'; Diakité (yellow card) 74'; Baleba (yellow card) 90+3'	Report	Wooh (yellow card) 36'; Bourigeaud 58' (pen.); Meling (red card) 90'	Stadium: Stade Pierre-Mauroy; Attendance: 35,539; Referee: Johan Hamel

12 November 2022 15	Rennes	2–1	Toulouse	Rennes
21:00 CET (UTC+1)	Bourigeaud 25'; Kalimuendo 58'	Report	Dallinga 55'	Stadium: Roazhon Park; Attendance: 26,835; Referee: Willy Delajod

29 December 2022 16	Reims	3–1	Rennes	Reims
19:00 CET (UTC+1)	Balogun 6', 84', (yellow card) 83'; Ito (yellow card) 20'; Flips 22'	Report	Bourigeaud (yellow card) 42'; Theate 45+1'; Omari (yellow card) 59'	Stadium: Stade Auguste-Delaune; Attendance: 13,262; Referee: Hakim Ben El Hadj

2 January 2023 17	Rennes	2–1	Nice	Rennes
21:00 CET (UTC+1)	Terrier 5'; Bourigeaud (yellow card) 79', (goal) 89'	Report	Barkley 21'; Bard (yellow card) 85'	Stadium: Roazhon Park; Attendance: 27,427; Referee: Thomas Léonard

11 January 2023 18	Clermont	2–1	Rennes	Clermont-Ferrand
19:00 CET (UTC+1)	Kyei 30'; Gastien 90+4'	Report	Bourigeaud (yellow card) 45' (yellow-red card) 76'; Kalimuendo 73'; Omari (red card) 82'	Stadium: Stade Gabriel Montpied; Attendance: 10,648; Referee: Clément Turpin

15 January 2023 19	Rennes	1–0	Paris Saint-Germain	Rennes
20:45 CET (UTC+1)	Traoré 64'	Report		Stadium: Roazhon Park; Attendance: 27,566; Referee: Benoît Bastien

27 January 2023 20	Lorient	2–1	Rennes	Lorient
21:00 CET (UTC+1)	Talbi 13'; Le Bris 31'; Meïté (yellow card) 90+3'	Report	Theate (yellow card) 65'; Tait 72'	Stadium: Stade du Moustoir; Attendance: 16,782; Referee: Benoît Millot

1 February 2023 21	Rennes	3–0	Strasbourg	Rennes
21:00 CET (UTC+1)	Gouiri 3', 21'; D. Doué 51'	Report	Guilbert (yellow card) 15'	Stadium: Roazhon Park; Attendance: 28,176; Referee: Marc Bollengier

4 February 2023 22	Rennes	1–3	Lille	Rennes
21:00 CET (UTC+1)	Gouiri 1'; Ugochukwu (yellow card) 64'	Report	And. Gomes (yellow card) 20', (goal) 90+3'; Zhegrova 59'; Weah (yellow card) 81'; Cabella 85'	Stadium: Roazhon Park; Attendance: 28,082; Referee: Florent Batta

12 February 2023 23	Toulouse	3–1	Rennes	Toulouse
13:00 CET (UTC+1)	Desler (yellow card) 19'; Ratão 27'; Aboukhlal 28'; Dallinga 37'	Report	Rouault 55' (o.g.); Gouiri (yellow card) 90+1'	Stadium: Stadium de Toulouse; Attendance: 21,783; Referee: Jérémy Stinat

19 February 2023 24	Rennes	2–0	Clermont	Rennes
15:00 CET (UTC+1)	Kalimuendo 37', 64'	Report	Wieteska (yellow card) 48'; Rashani (yellow card) 52'	Stadium: Roazhon Park; Attendance: 27,798; Referee: Bastien Dechepy

26 February 2023 25	Nantes	0–1	Rennes	Nantes
15:00 CET (UTC+1)	Centonze (yellow card) 78'; Coco (yellow card) 89'	Report	Doku 19'; Omari (yellow card) 81'; Gouiri (yellow card) 90+3'	Stadium: Stade de la Beaujoire; Attendance: 34,467; Referee: Jérémie Pignard

5 March 2023 26	Rennes	0–1	Marseille	Rennes
20:45 CET (UTC+1)	D. Doué (yellow card) 66'	Report	Kolašinac 57'; Balerdi (yellow card) 90+1'	Stadium: Roazhon Park; Attendance: 28,515; Referee: Eric Wattellier

11 March 2023 27	Auxerre	0–0	Rennes	Auxerre
17:00 CET (UTC+1)	Zedadka (yellow card) 68'; Touré (yellow card) 79'	Report	Wooh (yellow card) 10'; Meling (yellow card) 84'	Stadium: Stade de l'Abbé-Deschamps; Attendance: 15,695; Referee: Mathieu Vernice

19 March 2023 28	Paris Saint-Germain	0–2	Rennes	Paris
17:05 CEST (UTC+2)	Zaïre-Emery (yellow card) 80'	Report	Toko Ekambi 45'; Kalimuendo 48'; Wooh (yellow card) 52'	Stadium: Parc des Princes; Attendance: 47,000; Referee: Willy Delajod

2 April 2023 29	Rennes	0–1	Lens	Rennes
21:00 CEST (UTC+2)	D. Doué (yellow card) 27'; Bourigeaud (yellow card) 82'	Report	Openda 31'; Danso (yellow card) 45+1'; Thomasson (yellow card) 61'	Stadium: Roazhon Park; Attendance: 28,556; Referee: Clément Turpin

9 April 2023 30	Lyon	3–1	Rennes	Décines-Charpieu
13:00 CEST (UTC+2)	Barcola (yellow card) 26', (goal) 79'; Kumbedi (yellow card) 32'; Tolisso 60'; Lacazette 68'	Report	Gouiri 11'; Theate (yellow card) 34'; Majer (yellow card) 39'	Stadium: Parc Olympique Lyonnais; Attendance: 44,671; Referee: Benoît Bastien

15 April 2023 31	Rennes	3–0	Reims	Rennes
17:00 CEST (UTC+2)	Doku 9', 19'; Ugochukwu (yellow card) 46'; Theate 68'	Report	Munetsi (yellow card) 81'; Agbadou (yellow card) 82'	Stadium: Roazhon Park; Attendance: 27,936; Referee: Jérémy Stinat

23 April 2023 32	Montpellier	1–0	Rennes	Montpellier
17:05 CEST (UTC+2)	Kouyaté (yellow card) 46'; Savanier (red card) 52'; Wahi (yellow card) 54'; Khazri (yellow card) 55'; Mavididi 83'	Report	Ugochukwu (yellow card) 43'; Theate (yellow card) 54'	Stadium: Stade de la Mosson; Attendance: 15,537; Referee: Ruddy Buquet

30 April 2023 33	Rennes	4–2	Angers	Rennes
15:00 CEST (UTC+2)	Gouiri 25'; Hountondji 35' (o.g.); Doku 54', 84'; Wooh (yellow card) 66'	Report	Bentaleb 19' (pen.); Hountondji (yellow card) 23'; Niane 42'; Thioub (yellow card) 69'	Stadium: Roazhon Park; Attendance: 28,028; Referee: Florent Batta

6 May 2023 34	Nice	2–1	Rennes	Nice
17:00 CEST (UTC+2)	Laborde 50'; Moffi 72'	Report	Traoré (yellow card) 55'; Bourigeaud 78'	Stadium: Allianz Riviera; Attendance: 22,601; Referee: Willy Delajod

14 May 2023 35	Rennes	4–0	Troyes	Rennes
15:00 CEST (UTC+2)	Theate 14'; Bourigeaud 65'; Toko Ekambi 70', 74'	Report	Kouamé (yellow card) 32'	Stadium: Roazhon Park; Attendance: 27,836; Referee: Stéphanie Frappart

21 May 2023 36	Ajaccio	0–5	Rennes	Ajaccio
13:00 CEST (UTC+2)	Vidal (yellow card) 56'; Alphonse (red card) 62'	Report	Santamaria 13'; Gouiri 30', 39', 70'; Doku 36'; Belocian (yellow card) 45'; Assignon (yellow card) 84'	Stadium: Stade François Coty; Attendance: 6,637; Referee: Eric Wattelier

27 May 2023 37	Rennes	2–0	Monaco	Rennes
21:00 CEST (UTC+2)	Majer 51'; Gouiri 72'	Report	Vanderson (yellow card) 10'; Maripán (yellow card) 54'; Embolo (yellow card) 79'	Stadium: Roazhon Park; Attendance: 28,344; Referee: Clément Turpin

3 June 2023 38	Brest	1–2	Rennes	Brest
21:00 CEST (UTC+2)	Belkebla 36' (pen.); Magnetti (yellow card) 42'; Lees-Melou (yellow card) 45+2'; Lemaréchal (yellow card) 90+4'	Report	Bourigeaud 14', 45+4' (pen.), (yellow card) 85'; Meling (yellow card) 83'; Alemdar (yellow card) 90+4'	Stadium: Stade Francis-Le Blé; Attendance: 15,143; Referee: Jérôme Brisard

=== Coupe de France ===
7 January 2023 Round of 64	Bordeaux	1–2	Rennes	Bordeaux
20:45 CET (UTC+1)	Bokele (red card) 6'; Maja 45+2'	Report	Bourigeaud 23'; Doku 53'; Wooh (yellow card) 70'	Stadium: Matmut Atlantique; Attendance: 20,000; Referee: Pierre Gaillouste

20 January 2023 Round of 32	Marseille	1–0	Rennes	Marseille
21:10 CET (UTC+1)	Balerdi (yellow card) 45+1'; Guendouzi 59'	Report	Wooh (yellow card) 8'; Traoré (yellow card) 73'	Stadium: Stade Vélodrome; Attendance: 57,103; Referee: Stéphanie Frappart

=== UEFA Europa League ===
==== Group stage ====
The draw for the group stage was held on 26 August 2022.

Pos	Team	Pld	W	D	L	GF	GA	GD	Pts	Qualification	FEN	REN	AEK	DKV
1	(Turkey) Fenerbahçe	6	4	2	0	13	7	+6	14	Advance to round of 16	—	3–3	2–0	2–1
2	(France) Rennes	6	3	3	0	11	8	+3	12	Advance to knockout round play-offs	2–2	—	1–1	2–1
3	(Cyprus) AEK Larnaca	6	1	2	3	7	10	−3	5	Transfer to Europa Conference League	1–2	1–2	—	3–3
4	(Ukraine) Dynamo Kyiv	6	0	1	5	5	11	−6	1		0–2	0–1	0–1	—

Source: UEFA
Rules for classification: Group stage tiebreakers

8 September 2022 1	AEK Larnaca (Cyprus)	1–2	(France) Rennes	Larnaca, Cyprus
19:45 EEST (UTC+3)	Oier 33'; Christoforou (yellow card) 90'	Report	Theate 29'; Santamaria (yellow card) 69'; Assignon 90+4'	Stadium: AEK Arena – Georgios Karapatakis; Attendance: 4,103; Referee: Giorgi Kruashvili (Georgia)

15 September 2022 2	Rennes (France)	2–2	(Turkey) Fenerbahçe	Rennes
21:00 CEST (UTC+2)	Terrier 52'; Majer 54', (yellow card) 76'; Traoré (red card) 83'; Bourigeaud (yellow card) 90+1'; Rodon (yellow card) 90+3'; Theate (yellow card) 90+4'	Report	Kahveci 60'; Valencia 90+2' (pen.); João Pedro (yellow card) 90+3'	Stadium: Roazhon Park; Attendance: 20,993; Referee: Aleksei Kulbakov (Belarus)

6 October 2022 3	Rennes (France)	2–1	(Ukraine) Dynamo Kyiv	Rennes
21:00 CEST (UTC+2)	Terrier 23'; D. Doué 89'	Report	Tsyhankov 33'; Zabarnyi (yellow card) 88'	Stadium: Roazhon Park; Attendance: 24,761; Referee: José María Sánchez Martínez (Spain)

13 October 2022 4	Dynamo Kyiv (Ukraine)	0–1	(France) Rennes	Kraków, Poland
18:45 CEST (UTC+2)	Besedin (yellow card) 44'; Tymchyk (yellow card) 53'; Vanat (yellow card) 90+4'	Report	Bourigeaud (yellow card) 24'; Wooh 48'; D. Doué (yellow card) 70'	Stadium: Stadion Cracovii im. Józefa Piłsudskiego; Attendance: 5,398; Referee: Serdar Gözübüyük (Netherlands)
Note: Dynamo Kyiv played at Stadion Cracovii im. Józefa Piłsudskiego in Kraków, Poland, instead of their regular stadium NSC Olimpiyskiy in Kyiv, due to the Russian invasion of Ukraine.

27 October 2022 5	Fenerbahçe (Turkey)	3–3	(France) Rennes	Istanbul, Turkey
19:45 TRT (UTC+3)	Arão (yellow card) 3'; Kahveci (yellow card) 28'; Valencia 42'; Zajc 82'; Mor 88'	Report	Gouiri 5', 30'; Terrier 16'; D. Doué (yellow card) 73'; Ugochukwu (yellow card) 90+2'; Traoré (yellow card) 90+4'	Stadium: Şükrü Saracoğlu Stadium; Attendance: 34,840; Referee: Novak Simović (Serbia)

3 November 2022 6	Rennes (France)	1–1	(Cyprus) AEK Larnaca	Rennes
21:00 CET (UTC+1)	Abline 17'; Tait (yellow card) 18'	Report	Miličević (yellow card) 28'; Lopes 76'; Rosales (yellow card) 85'	Stadium: Roazhon Park; Attendance: 27,210; Referee: Mohammed Al-Hakim (Sweden)

==== Knockout phase ====
===== Knockout round play-offs =====
The draw for the knockout round play-offs was held on 7 November 2022.

16 February 2023 First leg	Shakhtar Donetsk (Ukraine)	2–1	(France) Rennes	Warsaw, Poland
18:45 CET (UTC+1)	Kryskiv 11'; Stepanenko (yellow card) 40'; Bondarenko 45' (pen.); Mykhaylichenko (yellow card) 85'; Zubkov (yellow card) 85'	Report	Bourigeaud (yellow card) 43'; Ugochukwu (yellow card) 57'; Toko Ekambi 59'; Omari (yellow card) 85'	Stadium: Stadion Wojska Polskiego; Attendance: 13,415; Referee: Irfan Peljto (Bosnia and Herzegovina)
Note: Due to the Russian invasion of Ukraine, Ukrainian teams were required to play their home matches at neutral venues until further notice. Therefore, Shakhtar Donetsk played at Stadion Wojska Polskiego, Warsaw, Poland, instead of their regular stadium, Donbas Arena in Donetsk.

23 February 2023 Second leg	Rennes (France)	2–1 (a.e.t.) (3–3 agg.) (4–5 p)	(Ukraine) Shakhtar Donetsk	Rennes
21:00 CET (UTC+1)	Toko Ekambi 52'; Spence (yellow card) 54'; Salah 106'	Report	Bondar (yellow card) 63'; Traoré (yellow card) 68'; Mykhaylichenko (yellow card) 82'; Konoplya (yellow card) 90+4'; Belocian 119' (o.g.); Matviyenko (yellow card) 120+2'	Stadium: Roazhon Park; Attendance: 27,781; Referee: Tobias Stieler (Germany)
	Penalties
	D. Doué (penalty scored); Doku (penalty missed); Meling (penalty missed); Gouiri (penalty scored); Tait (penalty scored); Omari (penalty scored); Ugochukwu (penalty missed)		(penalty scored) Nazaryna; (penalty scored) Sudakov; (penalty scored) Bondarenko; (penalty missed) Bondar; (penalty missed) Sikan; (penalty scored) Konoplya; (penalty scored) Kelsy

== Statistics ==
=== Appearances and goals ===
No.	Pos	Nat	Player	Total		Ligue 1		Coupe de France		UEFA Europa League	
No.	Pos	Nat	Player	Apps	Goals	Apps	Goals	Apps	Goals	Apps	Goals
Goalkeepers
1	GK	(Turkey) TUR	Doğan Alemdar	5	0	2+1	0	1	0	1	0
30	GK	(France) FRA	Steve Mandanda	34	0	26	0	1	0	7	0
39	GK	(Tunisia) TUN	Elias Damergy	0	0	0	0	0	0	0	0
89	GK	(France) FRA	Romain Salin	0	0	0	0	0	0	0	0
Defenders
2	DF	(Wales) WAL	Joe Rodon	20	1	14	1	1	0	5	0
3	DF	(France) FRA	Adrien Truffert	34	0	24+4	0	0+1	0	4+1	0
5	DF	(Belgium) BEL	Arthur Theate	34	3	27	2	2	0	5	1
15	DF	(Cameroon) CMR	Christopher Wooh	14	1	10+1	0	2	0	1	1
18	DF	(France) FRA	Jeanuël Belocian	5	0	1+1	0	0	0	3	0
22	DF	(France) FRA	Lorenz Assignon	12	1	2+4	0	0+1	0	3+2	1
23	MF	(France) FRA	Warmed Omari	9	0	6+1	0	0	0	2	0
25	MF	(Norway) NOR	Birger Meling	28	0	5+15	0	1	0	5+2	0
27	DF	(Mali) MLI	Hamari Traoré	26	1	18+3	1	2	0	3	0
31	DF	(France) FRA	Guéla Doué	1	0	0+1	0	0	0	0	0
90	DF	(England) ENG	Djed Spence	9	0	7	0	0	0	2	0
Midfielders
6	MF	(France) FRA	Lesley Ugochukwu	26	0	9+8	0	1+1	0	5+2	0
8	MF	(France) FRA	Baptiste Santamaria	20	1	14+2	1	0+1	0	2+1	0
14	MF	(France) FRA	Benjamin Bourigeaud	36	4	27	3	2	1	6+1	0
20	MF	(France) FRA	Flavien Tait	32	2	16+8	2	1	0	4+3	0
21	MF	(Croatia) CRO	Lovro Majer	32	2	12+10	1	2	0	7+1	1
33	MF	(France) FRA	Désiré Doué	29	4	10+11	3	1	0	1+6	1
35	MF	(France) FRA	Noah Françoise	0	0	0	0	0	0	0	0
80	MF	(Portugal) POR	Xeka	9	0	6+2	0	1	0	0	0
Forwards
7	FW	(France) FRA	Martin Terrier	22	12	16	9	0	0	5+1	3
9	FW	(France) FRA	Arnaud Kalimuendo	28	7	18+3	7	0+1	0	4+2	0
11	FW	(Belgium) BEL	Jérémy Doku	25	2	5+14	1	1+1	1	2+2	0
17	FW	(Cameroon) CMR	Karl Toko Ekambi	10	3	6+2	1	0	0	2	2
19	FW	(France) FRA	Amine Gouiri	32	11	20+3	9	2	0	5+2	2
38	FW	(Morocco) MAR	Ibrahim Salah	9	1	1+6	0	0	0	0+2	1
41	FW	(Gabon) GAB	Alan Do Marcolino	2	0	0+2	0	0	0	0	0
Players transferred out during the season
9	FW	(Guinea) GUI	Serhou Guirassy	1	0	0+1	0	0	0	0	0
10	MF	(Ghana) GHA	Kamaldeen Sulemana	20	1	2+12	1	2	0	2+2	0
28	FW	(France) FRA	Matthis Abline	14	2	0+11	1	0	0	2+1	1

Last updated: 19 March 2023
Source: Competitions
