= Aboubakar Nagida =

Cameroonian footballer

Personal information
- Full name: Mahamadou Aboubakar Nagida
- Date of birth: 28 June 2005 (age 21)
- Place of birth: Douala, Cameroon
- Height: 1.75 m (5 ft 9 in)
- Position: Left-back

Team information
- Current team: Rennes
- Number: 18

Youth career
- 2022–2023: EFBC

Senior career*
Years	Team	Apps	(Gls)
2023–2026	Rennes II	8	(1)
2023–	Rennes	40	(2)

International career^{‡}
2023	Cameroon U20	5	(0)
2025–	Cameroon	14	(1)
- * Club domestic league appearances and goals as of 20 September 2026 ‡ National team caps and goals as of 16 November 2026

Mahamadou Aboubakar Nagida (born 28 June 2005) is a Cameroonian professional footballer who plays as a left-back for Ligue 1 club Rennes and the Cameroon national team.

== Club career ==
Nagida is a youth product of the Cameroonian academy Ecole de Football Brasseries du Cameroun. On 21 August 2023, he transferred to the Ligue 1 club Rennes on a five-year contract. Originally assigned to their reserves, on 21 October 2023 he was called up to the senior squad for the first time for a Ligue 1 match. He made his professional debut with them as a substitute in a 3–0 UEFA Europa League win over Maccabi Haifa on 30 November 2023.

== International career ==
Nagida was part of the Cameroon U20s that won the 2023 Jeux de la Francophonie.

== Career statistics ==
=== Club ===
As of match played 20 September 2026

Appearances and goals by club, season and competition
Club	Season	League			Cup		Europe		Total	
Club	Season	Division	Apps	Goals	Apps	Goals	Apps	Goals	Goals	Apps
Rennes B	2023–24	National 2	5	1	—		—		5	1
Rennes B	2024–25	National 2	3	0	—		—		3	0
Rennes B	Total		8	1	—		—		8	1
Rennes	2023–24	Ligue 1	3	0	2	0	3 (Note: Appearances in UEFA Europa League)	0	8	0
Rennes	2024–25	Ligue 1	13	2	0	0	—		13	2
Rennes	2025–26	Ligue 1	19	0	1	0	—		20	0
Rennes	2026–27	Ligue 1	5	0	0	0	1	0	6	0
Rennes	Total		40	2	3	0	4	0	47	2
Career total			51	3	3	0	4	0	58	3

=== International ===
As of match played 16 November 2026

Appearances and goals by national team and year
National team	Year	Apps	Goals
Cameroon	2025	7	0
Cameroon	2026	7	1
Total		14	1

== Honours ==
Cameroon U20 Jeux de la Francophonie: 2023
