= Adrien Truffert =

French footballer (born 2001)

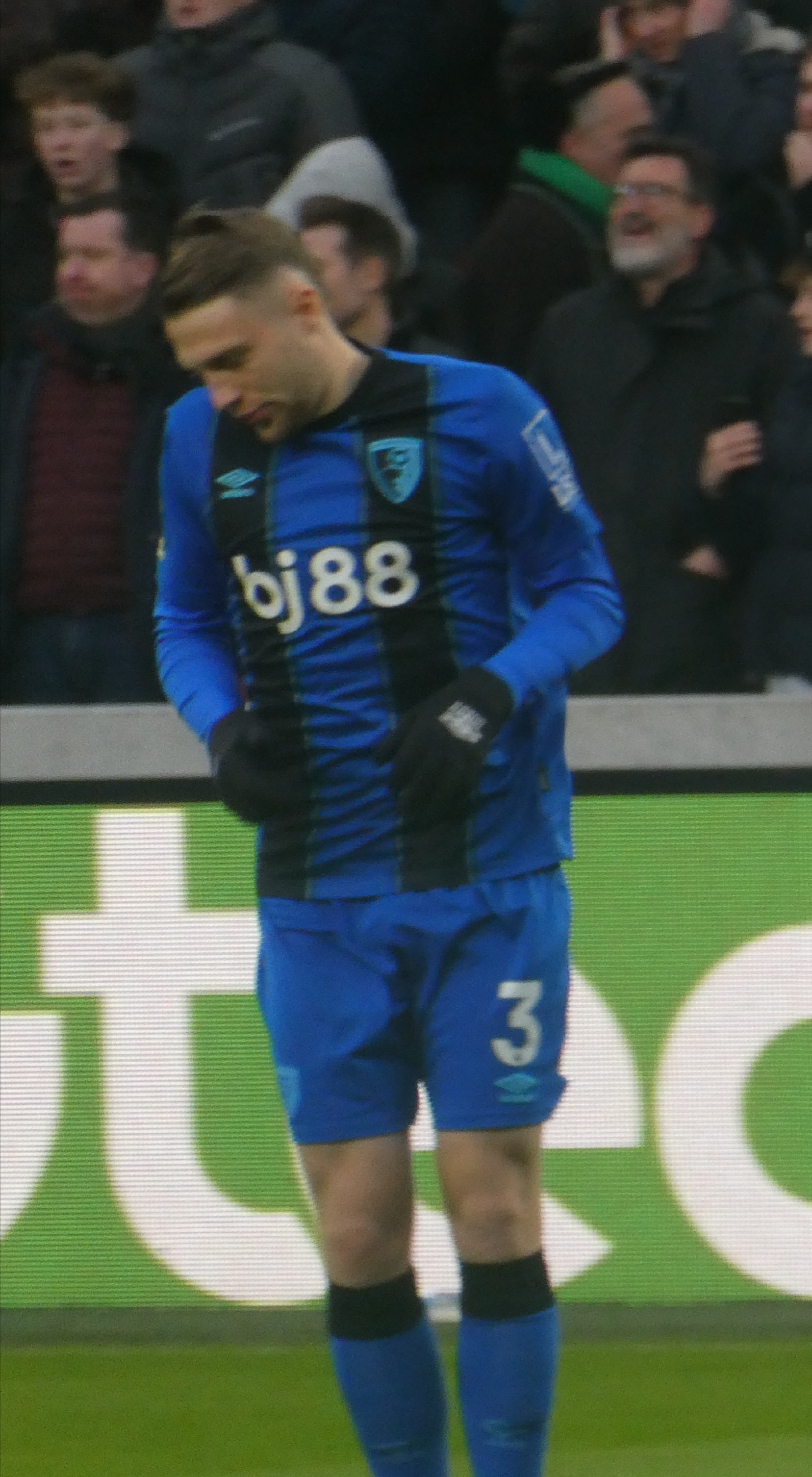
- Truffert with Bournemouth in 2025

Personal information
- Full name: Adrien Lilian Gaëtan Truffert
- Date of birth: 20 November 2001 (age 24)
- Place of birth: Liège, Belgium
- Height: 1.76 m (5 ft 9 in)
- Position: Left-back

Team information
- Current team: Bournemouth
- Number: 3

Youth career
- 2007–2010: ES Jouy St Prest
- 2010–2015: Chartres
- 2015–2018: Rennes

Senior career*
Years	Team	Apps	(Gls)
2018–2020	Rennes B	15	(0)
2020–2025	Rennes	150	(7)
2025–	Bournemouth	48	(1)

International career^{‡}
2019	France U18	6	(1)
2019	France U19	8	(3)
2020–2022	France U21	15	(0)
2024	France Olympic	10	(0)
2022–	France	4	(0)
Medal record
Men's football
Representing France
Olympic Games
Silver medal – second place	Paris 2024	Team
- * Club domestic league appearances and goals as of 8 November 2026 ‡ National team caps and goals as of 12 November 2026

Adrien Lilian Gaëtan Truffert (born 20 November 2001) is a French professional footballer who plays as a left-back for Premier League club Bournemouth and the France national team.

== Early life ==
Adrien Truffert was born on 20 November 2001 in Liège, Belgium to French parents Laurence and Jean-Christophe Truffert. When Adrien was six months old, his family moved to Southampton because his father was a laboratory director. Truffert's family moved back to Belgium, then returned to France six months afterward.

== Club career ==
=== Rennes ===
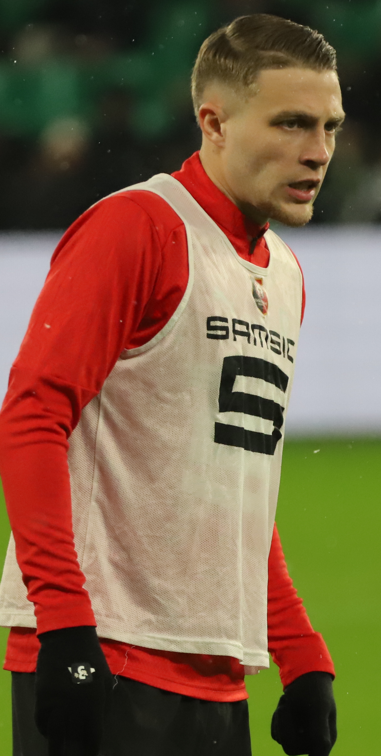
Truffert with Rennes in 2025

On 28 May 2020, Truffert signed his first professional contract with Rennes. He made his debut for the club on 19 September 2020 against Monaco. He came on as a 41st minute substitute for Faitout Maouassa, and had an assist and scored the game-winning goal in his debut.

=== Bournemouth ===
On 16 June 2025, Truffert signed for Bournemouth in the Premier League on a five–year contract in a £14.4m deal made up of an £11.4m fee with £3m possible add-on fees. Rennes also negotiated a 10% sell-on fee.

== International career ==
Truffert was born in Belgium to French parents, and moved back to France at a young age. He made his international debut for France at the under-19 level on 9 October 2019 against England U19.

On 20 September 2022, Truffert received his first call-up to the France national team for two UEFA Nations League matches, replacing the injured Lucas Digne.

== Career statistics ==
=== Club ===
As of match played 8 November 2026

Appearances and goals by club, season and competition
Club	Season	League			National cup (Note: Includes Coupe de France, FA Cup)		League cup		Europe		Total	
Club	Season	Division	Apps	Goals	Apps	Goals	Apps	Goals	Apps	Goals	Apps	Goals
Rennes B	2018–19	Championnat National 3	1	0	—		—		—		1	0
Rennes B	2019–20	Championnat National 3	12	0	—		—		—		12	0
Rennes B	2020–21	Championnat National 3	2	0	—		—		—		2	0
Rennes B	Total		15	0	—		—		—		15	0
Rennes	2020–21	Ligue 1	29	1	0	0	—		5 (Note: Appearances in UEFA Champions League)	0	34	1
Rennes	2021–22	Ligue 1	30	3	2	0	—		9 (Note: Appearances in UEFA Europa Conference League)	0	41	3
Rennes	2022–23	Ligue 1	28	0	2	0	—		8 (Note: Appearances in UEFA Europa League)	0	38	0
Rennes	2023–24	Ligue 1	30	1	5	0	—		8	1	43	2
Rennes	2024–25	Ligue 1	33	2	2	1	—		—		35	3
Rennes	Total		150	7	11	1	—		30	1	191	9
Bournemouth	2025–26	Premier League	38	1	1	0	0	0	—		39	1
Bournemouth	2026–27	Premier League	10	0	0	0	0	0	3	0	13	0
Bournemouth	Total		48	1	1	0	0	0	3	0	52	1
Career total			213	8	12	1	0	0	33	1	258	10

=== International ===
As of match played 12 November 2026

Appearances and goals by national team and year
National team	Year	Apps	Goals
France	2022	1	0
France	2026	3	0
Total		4	0

== Honours ==
France U23

- Summer Olympics silver medal: 2024

Orders

- Knight of the National Order of Merit: 2024
