= Doğan Alemdar =

Turkish footballer (born 2002)

Personal information
- Date of birth: 29 October 2002 (age 24)
- Place of birth: Kocasinan, Kayseri, Turkey
- Height: 1.92 m (6 ft 4 in)
- Position: Goalkeeper

Team information
- Current team: Beşiktaş
- Number: 80

Youth career
- 2013–2018: Kayserispor

Senior career*
Years	Team	Apps	(Gls)
2019–2021	Kayserispor	29	(0)
2021	Rennes II	2	(0)
2021–2025	Rennes	18	(0)
2023–2024	→ Troyes (loan)	35	(0)
2025–2026	Başakşehir	0	(0)
2026–	Beşiktaş	0	(0)

International career^{‡}
2019	Turkey U17	2	(0)
2019–2020	Turkey U18	3	(0)
2020	Turkey U19	1	(0)
2021–	Turkey U21	13	(0)
2022	Turkey	2	(0)
- * Club domestic league appearances and goals as of 8 July 2026 ‡ National team caps and goals as of 22:24, 11 October 2024 (UTC)

Doğan Alemdar (born 29 October 2002) is a Turkish professional footballer who plays as a goalkeeper for Süper Lig club Beşiktaş.

== Club career ==
Alemdar started playing football for Kayserispor at the age of 10.

On 12 March 2018, he signed his first professional contract with Kayserispor aged 15. He became the youngest captain of Kayserispor history when he made also his professional debut for the club in a Turkish Cup tie against Manisa FK on 19 December 2019, aged 17.

Alemdar moved to Ligue 1 club Rennes in August 2021. Alemdar was signed by Ligue 2 club Troyes on loan for the 2023–24 season.

On 12 September 2025, Alemdar signed a four-year contract with Süper Lig club Başakşehir. On 8 July 2026, Alemdar joined the Süper Lig club Beşiktaş on a four-year deal.

== Career statistics ==
As of match played 3 March 2026

Appearances and goals by club, season and competition
Club	Season	League			National cup		Europe		Other		Total	
Club	Season	Division	Apps	Goals	Apps	Goals	Apps	Goals	Apps	Goals	Apps	Goals
Kayserispor	2018–19	Süper Lig	0	0	0	0	—		—		0	0
Kayserispor	2019–20	Süper Lig	0	0	1	0	—		—		1	0
Kayserispor	2020–21	Süper Lig	28	0	1	0	—		—		29	0
Kayserispor	2021–22	Süper Lig	1	0	—		—		—		1	0
Kayserispor	Total		29	0	2	0	—		—		31	0
Rennes II	2021–22	National 3	1	0	—		—		—		1	0
Rennes II	2022–23	National 2	1	0	—		—		—		1	0
Rennes II	2024–25	National 3	3	0	—		—		—		3	0
Rennes II	Total		5	0	—		—		—		5	0
Rennes	2021–22	Ligue 1	12	0	1	0	1	0	—		14	0
Rennes	2022–23	Ligue 1	6	0	1	0	2	0	—		9	0
Rennes	2024–25	Ligue 1	0	0	0	0	—		—		0	0
Rennes	2025–26	Ligue 1	0	0	—		—		—		0	0
Rennes	Total		18	0	2	0	3	0	—		23	0
Troyes (loan)	2023–24	Ligue 2	35	0	0	0	—		—		35	0
Başakşehir	2025–26	Süper Lig	0	0	3	0	—		—		3	0
Career total			87	0	7	0	3	0	0	0	97	0
