= Mohamed Jaouab =

Moroccan footballer (born 2002)

Personal information
- Date of birth: 14 May 2002 (age 24)
- Place of birth: Kasba Tadla, Morocco
- Height: 1.90 m (6 ft 3 in)
- Position: Centre-back

Youth career
- 2018–2022: Mohammed VI Academy

Senior career*
Years	Team	Apps	(Gls)
2022–2024	Rennes B	24	(3)
2024	Amiens	11	(0)
2024–2025	Rennes	0	(0)
2024–2025	→ Amiens (loan)	24	(0)
2025–2026	Valladolid	7	(1)

International career^{‡}
2023	Morocco U23	2	(1)
- * Club domestic league appearances and goals as of 9 June 2026 ‡ National team caps and goals as of 00:58, 15 March 2024 (UTC)

Mohamed Jaouab (born 14 May 2002) is a Moroccan professional footballer who plays as a centre-back.

== Club career ==
In the summer of 2022, Jaouab left the Mohammed VI Football Academy, where he had spent the four previous years, and signed for French club Rennes on a two-season contract. During the summer of 2023, he extended his contract until 2027. On 16 January 2024, Jaouab joined Ligue 2 club Amiens on a contract until June 2027. The transfer fee paid to Rennes was reportedly between €300,000 and €400,000, with the club also holding a buy-back clause. On 1 July 2024, Jaouab resigned with his former Ligue 1 club Rennes. He was then loaned back to Amiens on 30 August 2024.

On 1 August 2025, Jaouab moved to Spain after signing a three-year contract with Segunda División side Real Valladolid. On 12 August of the following year, he terminated his link with the club.

== International career ==
Jaouab has represented Morocco at under-23 international level.
