= Ibrahim Salah (footballer, born 2001) =

Footballer (born 2001)

Ibrahim Salah ابراهيم صلاح
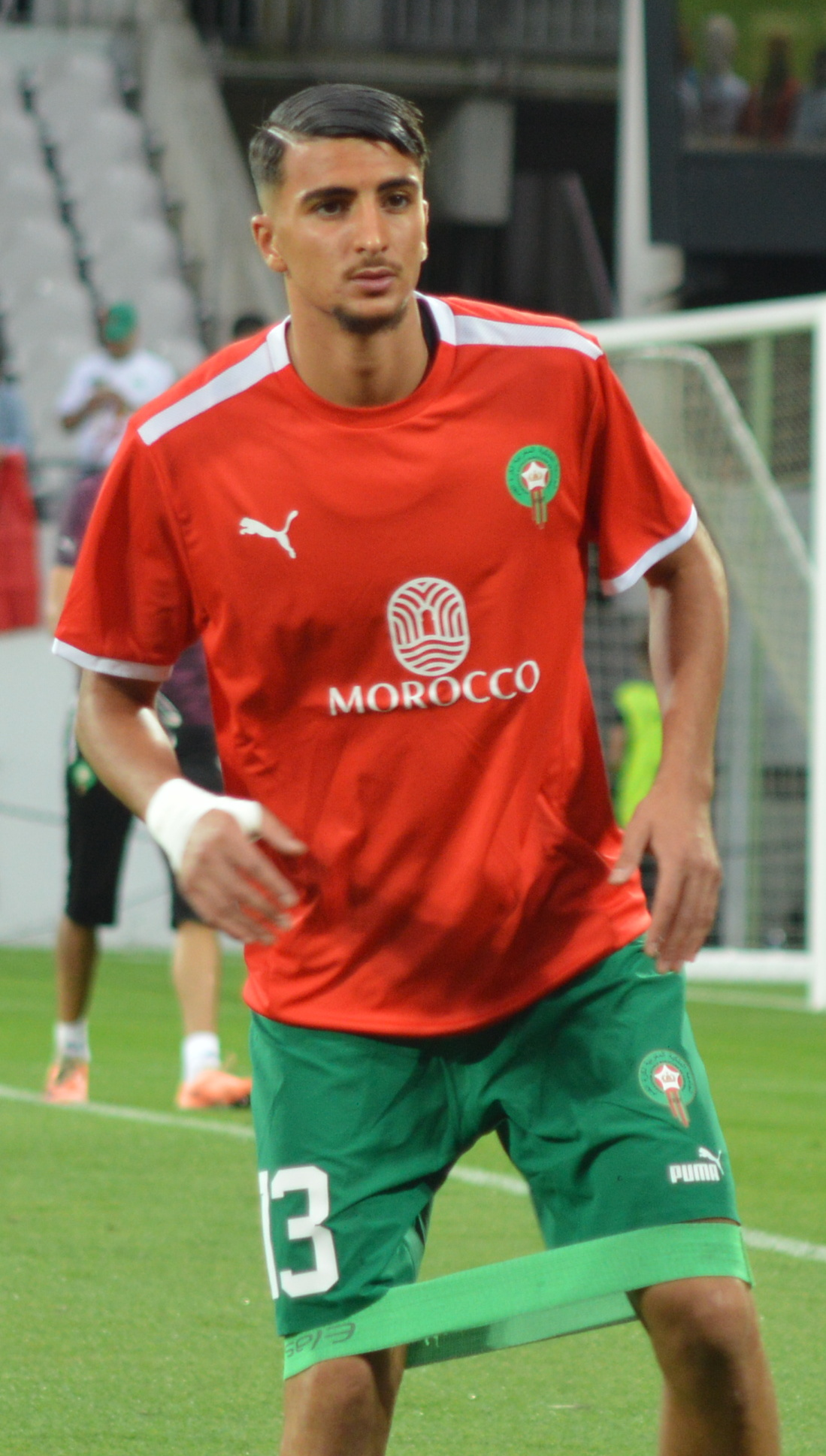
- Salah with Morocco in 2023

Personal information
- Date of birth: 30 August 2001 (age 25)
- Place of birth: Saint-Josse-ten-Noode, Belgium
- Height: 1.85 m (6 ft 1 in)
- Position: Right winger

Team information
- Current team: Royal Antwerp (on loan from Basel)
- Number: 77

Youth career
- Union Saint-Gilloise
- Beerschot
- 2021–2022: Gent

Senior career*
Years	Team	Apps	(Gls)
2022	Gent II	2	(3)
2022–2023	Gent	14	(3)
2023–2025	Rennes	37	(6)
2024–2025	→ Brest (loan)	12	(1)
2025–	Basel	27	(3)
2026–	→ Royal Antwerp (loan)	1	(0)

International career^{‡}
2023–2024	Morocco U23	10	(2)
Medal record
Representing Morocco
U-23 Africa Cup of Nations
Winner	2023 Morocco
- * Club domestic league appearances and goals as of 9 August 2026 ‡ National team caps and goals as of 08:26, 04 June 2024 (UTC)

Ibrahim Salah (Arabic: ابراهيم صلاح; born 30 August 2001) is a professional footballer who plays as a right winger for Belgian Pro League club Royal Antwerp, on loan from Swiss Super League club Basel. Born in Belgium, he has represented Morocco at youth international level.

== Club career ==
=== Gent ===
A youth product of Union Saint-Gilloise and Beerschot, In 2020 he was set to join Leicester City but the move failed for administrative reasons. Salah joined the youth academy of Gent on 28 May 2021. He signed his first professional contract with the club on 27 December 2021. In the summer of 2022, he started training with the senior team in preparation for the 2022–23 season. He made his senior and Belgian First Division A debut with the club as a substitute in a 2–1 win against Westerlo on 7 August 2022. In the opening months of the 2022–23 season Gent head coach Hein Vanhaezebrouck gave young players the chance to play in the first team such as Salah, Malick Fofana and Noah De Ridder. Salah and Fofana made their debut in that same game together against Westerloo. Vanhaezebrouck praised Salah for his efforts in training and said his standard was high enough to send a message to the more experienced players, and that he earned his place on merit.

=== Rennes ===
On 31 January 2023, Salah joined Ligue 1 side Rennes. He scored his first goal for the club on 23 February 2023 as a substitute in a 2–1 home win over Shakhtar Donetsk in the UEFA Europa League knockout round play-offs, a 106th-minute goal that put Rennes ahead on aggregate. However, his team eventually lost in a penalty shoot-out after Shakhtar Donetsk equalized later in extra time. On 12 August 2023, he scored his first two Ligue 1 goals in a 5–1 home win over Metz.

==== Loan to Brest ====
On 30 August 2024, Salah joined Brest on loan with an option to buy.

=== Basel ===
On 1 September 2025, Salah joined Swiss Super League club FC Basel.

==== Loan to Royal Antwerp ====
On 4 August 2026, he returned to Belgium and joined Royal Antwerp on loan with an option to buy.

== International career ==
Born in Belgium, Salah is of Moroccan descent. He was called up to the Morocco U23s for a training camp in November 2022.

In June 2023, he was included in the final squad of the under-23 national team for the 2023 U-23 Africa Cup of Nations, hosted by Morocco itself, where the Atlas Lions won their first title and qualified for the 2024 Summer Olympics.

In August 2023, Salah was called up for the first time to join the Moroccan senior national team, for the upcoming games against Liberia and Burkina Faso.

== Career statistics ==
=== Club ===
As of 11 May 2026

Appearances and goals by club, season and competition
Club	Season	League			National cup (Note: Includes Belgian Cup, Coupe de France, Swiss Cup)		Continental		Other		Total	
Club	Season	Division	Apps	Goals	Apps	Goals	Apps	Goals	Apps	Goals	Apps	Goals
Gent II	2022–23	Belgian Division 1	2	3	—		—		—		2	3
Gent	2022–23	Belgian Pro League	14	3	3	0	4 (Note: Appearances in UEFA Conference League)	0	—		21	3
Rennes	2022–23	Ligue 1	13	0	0	0	2 (Note: Appearance(s) in UEFA Europa League)	1	—		15	1
Rennes	2023–24	Ligue 1	23	4	3	1	6	1	—		32	6
Rennes	2025–26	Ligue 1	2	0	—		—		—		2	0
Rennes	Total		38	4	3	1	8	2	0	0	49	7
Rennes B	2023–24	Championnat National 3	1	2	—		—		—		1	2
Brest (loan)	2024–25	Ligue 1	12	1	3	1	6 (Note: Appearance(s) in UEFA Champions League)	0	—		21	2
FC Basel	2025–26	Swiss Super League	25	3	2	0	6	1	—		33	4
Career total			60	16	11	2	24	3	0	0	95	4

== Honours ==
Morocco U23

- U-23 Africa Cup of Nations: 2023
