= Geoffrey Lembet =

Footballer (born 1988)

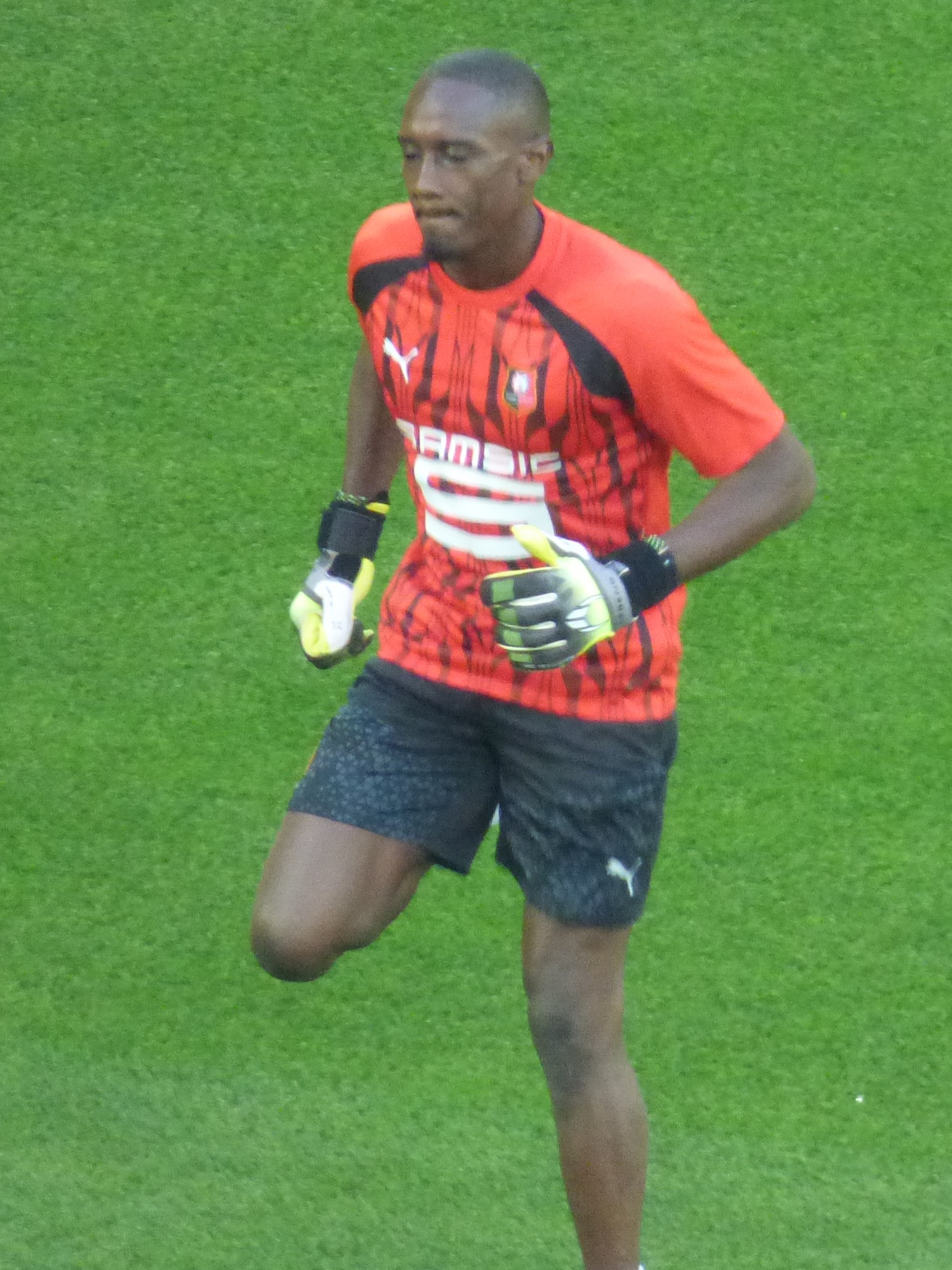
- Lembet with Rennes in 2023

Personal information
- Full name: Geoffrey Didace Lembet
- Date of birth: 22 September 1988 (age 38)
- Place of birth: Villeneuve-Saint-Georges, France
- Height: 1.85 m (6 ft 1 in)
- Position: Goalkeeper

Team information
- Current team: Nancy
- Number: 30

Senior career*
Years	Team	Apps	(Gls)
2007–2008	Viry-Châtillon	0	(0)
2008–2013	Sedan B	21	(0)
2011–2012	Sedan	7	(0)
2013–2016	Auxerre B	11	(0)
2013–2016	Auxerre	27	(0)
2016–2017	Red Star	19	(0)
2017–2019	Laval	0	(0)
2017–2019	Laval B	2	(0)
2019–2023	Sedan	98	(0)
2023–2025	Rennes	0	(0)
2025–	Nancy	1	(0)

International career^{‡}
2010–	Central African Republic	34	(0)
- * Club domestic league appearances and goals as of 7 September 2026 ‡ National team caps and goals as of 21 March 2024 (UTC)

Geoffrey Didace Lembet (born 23 September 1988) is a professional footballer who plays as a goalkeeper for Ligue 2 club Nancy. Born in France, he plays for the Central African Republic national team.

== Club career ==
Born in Villeneuve-Saint-Georges, Lembet has played club football for Viry-Châtillon, Sedan, Auxerre, Red Star, and Laval.

He signed for Rennes in July 2023.

== International career ==
Born in France, Lembet is of Central African Republic descent. He made his international debut for Central African Republic in 2010.
