= Jeanuël Belocian =

French footballer (born 2005)

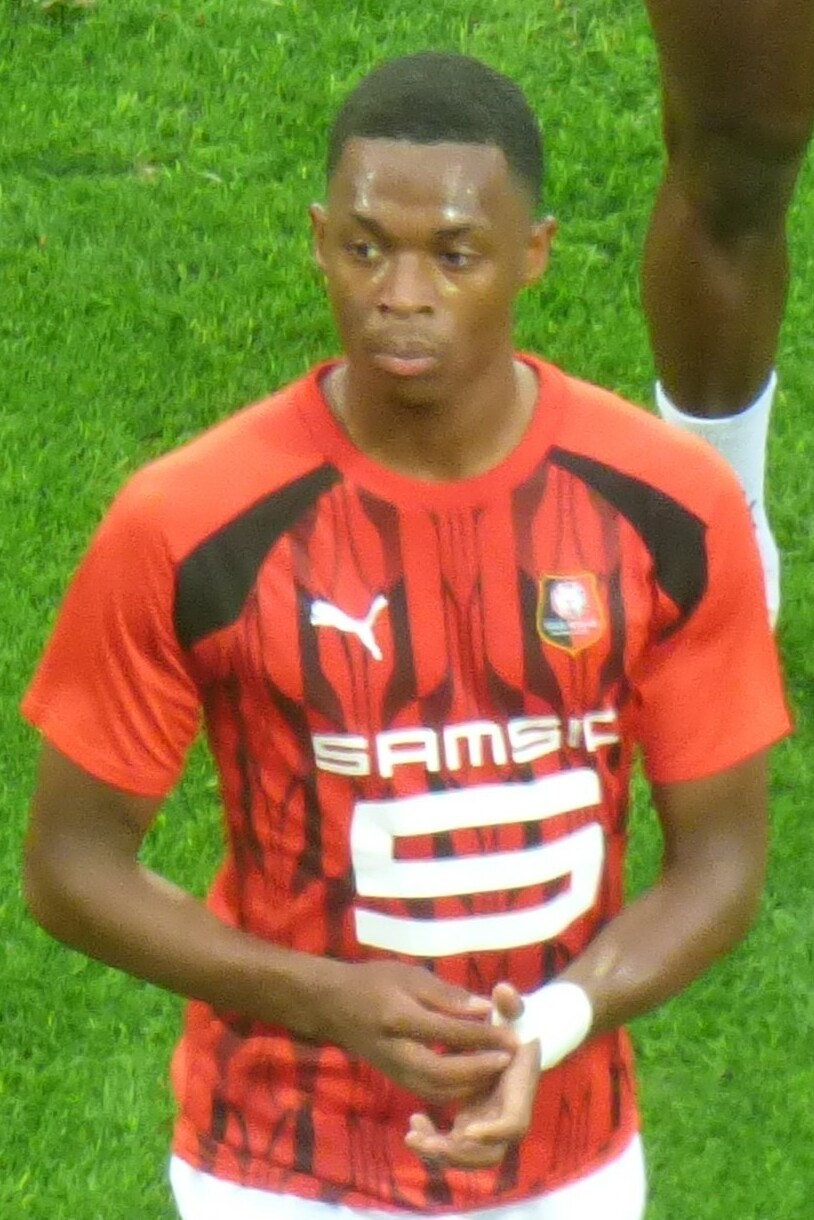
- Belocian with Rennes in 2023

Personal information
- Full name: Jeanuël Merick Belocian
- Date of birth: 17 February 2005 (age 21)
- Place of birth: Les Abymes, Guadeloupe
- Height: 1.82 m (6 ft 0 in)
- Positions: Centre-back; central midfielder

Team information
- Current team: Racing de Santander (on loan from Bayer Leverkusen)
- Number: 24

Youth career
- 2010–2013: AJC
- 2013–2020: Stade Lamentinois
- 2020–2022: Rennes

Senior career*
Years	Team	Apps	(Gls)
2021–2023	Rennes II	14	(0)
2022–2024	Rennes	32	(0)
2024–	Bayer Leverkusen	13	(0)
2026	→ VfL Wolfsburg (loan)	14	(0)
2026–	→ Racing de Santander (loan)	6	(1)

International career^{‡}
2021–2022	France U17	18	(0)
2022–2023	France U18	6	(0)
2023–2024	France U19	4	(0)
2023–	France U21	7	(0)
Medal record
Men's football
Representing France
UEFA European Under-17 Championship
Winner	2022 Israel
- * Club domestic league appearances and goals as of 17:30, 16 May 2026 (UTC) ‡ National team caps and goals as of 17 November 2025

Jeanuël Merick Belocian (born 17 February 2005) is a French professional footballer who plays as a centre-back or central midfielder for La Liga club Racing de Santander, on loan from Bundesliga club Bayer Leverkusen.

== Club career ==
=== Early career ===
Born and raised in Guadeloupe, Belocian joined the youth association of AJC at age 5 before joining Stade Lamentinois at age 8. Belocian joined the youth academy of Rennes in July 2020 and signed his first professional contract with the club on 10 November 2021, with the contract running until 2024.

Jeanuël Belocian made his professional debut for Rennes on the 20 March 2022, replacing Nayef Aguerd at the 79th minute of a 6–1 home Ligue 1 win to Metz.

=== Bayer Leverkusen ===
On 7 June 2024, Belocian signed for reigning German Bundesliga champions Bayer Leverkusen, penning a five-year deal.

==== Loans to VfL Wolfsburg and Racing de Santander ====
On 2 February 2026, he joined fellow Bundesliga club VfL Wolfsburg on loan until the end of the season. On 1 September, he moved to Spanish newly promoted La Liga side Racing de Santander also in a temporary deal.

== Personal life ==
Jeanuël is the younger brother of Wilhem Belocian, a French Olympic hurdler and sprinter.

== Career statistics ==
As of match played 25 May 2026

Appearances and goals by club, season and competition
Club	Season	League			National cup		Continental		Other		Total	
Club	Season	Division	Apps	Goals	Apps	Goals	Apps	Goals	Apps	Goals	Apps	Goals
Rennes II	2021–22	Championnat National 3	11	0	—		—		—		11	0
Rennes II	2022–23	Championnat National 2	3	0	—		—		—		3	0
Rennes II	Total		14	0	0	0	0	0	0	0	14	0
Rennes	2021–22	Ligue 1	1	0	—		0	0	—		1	0
Rennes	2022–23	Ligue 1	8	0	0	0	3 (Note: Appearances in UEFA Europa League)	0	—		11	0
Rennes	2023–24	Ligue 1	23	0	1	0	3	0	—		27	0
Rennes	Total		32	0	1	0	6	0	0	0	39	0
Bayer Leverkusen	2024–25	Bundesliga	5	0	1	0	2 (Note: Appearances in UEFA Champions League)	0	1 (Note: Appearance in DFL-Supercup)	0	9	0
Bayer Leverkusen	2025–26	Bundesliga	8	0	1	0	2	0	—		11	0
Bayer Leverkusen	Total		13	0	2	0	4	0	1	0	20	0
VfL Wolfsburg (loan)	2025–26	Bundesliga	14	0	—		—		2 (Note: Appearances in Bundesliga relegation play-offs)	0	16	0
Career total			73	0	3	0	10	0	3	0	89	0

== Honours ==
Bayer Leverkusen

- DFL-Supercup: 2024

France U17

- UEFA European Under-17 Championship: 2022
