= Sardinia national football team =

Unofficial national football team representing the region of Sardinia

Sardinia
- Nickname: Sa Natzionale
- Association: Sardinian National Sports Federation (Federatzione Isport Natzionale Sardu)
- Head coach: Vittorio Pusceddu
- Captain: Claudio Pani
- Most caps: Simone Pinna; Daniele Molino (3)
- Top scorer: Davide Arras (4)
- FIFA code: SRD
| First colours | Second colours |

First international
- Sardinia 2–10 England (Oristano, Sardinia; 5 June 1990)

Biggest win
- Torpè 1–13 Sardinia (Torpè, Sardinia; 15 May 2022)

Biggest defeat
- Sardinia 2-10 England (Oristano, Sardinia; 5 June 1990)

The Sardinia national football team (Sardinian: Natzionale sarda de Bòcia) is the official football team of Sardinia. It is organised by the Sardinian National Sports Federation (Federatzione Isport Natzionale Sardu), founded in 2012. The team has been colloquially referred with the name Sa Natzionale.

Sardinia is not affiliated with either FIFA or UEFA and is therefore not allowed to participate in either the FIFA World Cup or the UEFA European Championship.

However, the National Federation was associated with the CONIFA, therefore the team could participate in the CONIFA World Football Cup and in CONIFA European Football Cup. However, Sardinia withdrew from CONIFA, having not featured in either competition, and is currently unaffiliated.

== History ==
=== The first two international matches ===
The first official documented appearance of a Sardinian national team dates back to 1990. The England national football team was in Sardinia for a training camp in order to prepare the 1990 FIFA World Cup in Italy, where, among other things, it was to play two of the three group stage matches in Cagliari (against Egypt and Ireland). Therefore, an island representative XI was formed including the best Sardinian players playing between Serie C and Amateurs to face the Three Lions in their first friendly match. The first players to wear the jersey of the Sardinian national team, under the orders of Mariano Dessì, dean of the Sardinian coaches of that time, were Nioi as goalkeeper, Spano, Moro, Bortolini and Tomasso in defense, the future sporting director of Cagliari Calcio Francesco Marroccu, Martinez, Tolu and Ennas in the midfield, Corda and Gianfranco Zola, the only professional and at that time militant in fresh Scudetto's winners S.S.C. Napoli. In the second half, Toffolon, Laconi, Carta, Nieddu, Di Laura, Mura, Napoli, Fara, and Angioni also entered. The game ended 10–2 for England: curiously, Sardinia went ahead, but only thanks to a voluntary own goal by Steve McMahon in the first minute before the island players still touched the ball. This gesture metaphorically symbolized what would have been any violent actions of the Hooligans, the most frenzied fringe of English fans, at the time feared throughout Europe. After this demonstration, given the imbalance of power, the game was dominated by England who scored with McMahon himself, a hat-trick by Neil Webb and one by Peter Beardsley, a double by Steve Bull and a goal by David Platt. However, for Tomasso there was the glory of scoring the first goal in the history of the Natzionale.

Seven years were needed before watching again a Sardinian selection in a football field. In July 1997, at the Stadio Quadrivio in Nuoro, thanks to the Sardinian leader of the Sardinian separatist party Sardinia Nation Francesco Cesaraccio, a friendly match was organized between the national teams of the sister Islands, Sardinia and the Corsica national football team. Compared to previous calls-up against England, the roster contained several professional players and essentially the best of Sardinian football at the time. The manager was Gustavo Giagnoni who called Gianfranco Pinna and Giuseppe Nioi as keepers. In defense Gian Battista Scugugia, Vittorio Pusceddu, Gianluca Festa and Salvatore Matrecano. In midfield Pier Giovanni Rutzittu, Marco Sanna, Pietro Garau, Massimiliano Pani, Alessandro Manca, Igor Marziano and two sons of emigrants: the Sardinian-German Sergio Allievi and the Sardinian-Dutch Daniel Agus. In attack Gianfranco Zola, Tomaso Tatti, Roberto Manca, Roberto Cau, Emanuele Matzuzzi and another emigrant, the Sardinian-Belgian Antonio Lai. The goalkeeper Nioi and Zola were the only ones called in both appointments, thus becoming record holders in the caps ranking. The game itself had been balanced and Sardinia won by 1–0 with a goal at the twentieth minute of the second half by the future Chelsea F.C.'s striker Gianfranco Zola.

=== First attempts of association as international member ===
History showed that the project of a National team of Sardinia remained occasional and it came back under the shadow. Only 11 years later it returned to talking about Nazionale Sarda. In 2008, in fact, in Gonnosfanadiga was founded the Lega Federale Calcio Sardegna (on the path of the Lega Federale Calcio Padania) by the tuscan Giampiero Sogus, son of a Sardinian migrant, with the involvement, as vice president of the Gonnosfanadiga's mayor Sisinnio Zanda at that time, as counselor the hotelier Marco Sardu and as secretary the lawyer Franco Loi. The League is immediately associated at the NF-Board, in that era the main board of the Non-FIFA international football, who organized the VIVA World Cup. While remaining officially affiliated with this confederation until its dissolution in 2008, no Sardinian national team will ever be formed, not even for friendly matches, except for an amateur tournament in Tuscany in which Sogus himself entered a team named "Sardinia" but with Tuscan players without island origins.

=== The FINS era and the affiliation to CONIFA ===
In 2012, thanks to the cultural initiatives by Project Republic of Sardinia, another separatist party, the Sardinian National Sports Federation (Federatzione Isport Natzionale Sardu) was created with the aim of creating Sardinian national selections, not only limited to football. The first experiences has been indeed related to the creation of the Sardinian futsal team, which played in 2012 and 2013 first at Fordongianus and then in Nuoro for some friendlies against the homologous selection of Catalonia.

Simultaneously, in 2013, due to the unfortunate occurrence of the Cyclone Cleopatra in Sardinia, which caused 19 victims, the Sardinian society returned to propose the establishment of a football selection, even if only for a charity match able to raise funds for the victims and for the reconstruction of the inhabited centers hit by the natural disaster. Vittorio Sanna, journalist from Assemini (one of the towns crashed by the disaster) but above all radio commentator of the Cagliari Calcio matches for the private radio station Radiolina, proposed himself for this organization and got in touch with the various professional Sardinian football players at the time. At the beginning the organization moved for a friendly match against Serie A's team Cagliari Calcio but the president Massimo Cellino did not give consent. Subsequently, an attempt was made to organize another friendly match against Corsica and the date was set for May of the following year, but eventually the plan had been abandoned.

Only 5 years later, the Sanna's projects and the FINS plans coincided and on 13 October 2018 the Federation announced the affiliation to the CONIFA, the maximum international organization for football not affiliated to FIFA, which groups all the "National teams without a State" and organizes, among other competitions, the CONIFA World Football Cup, a trophy that replaced the VIVA World Cup. Simultaneously with the entry into CONIFA, FINS announced its participation in the 2019 European Championships in Artsakh. The following week the new technical commissioner was announced, the Sardinian Bernardo Mereu, historical Sardinian coach who led island formations in the various professional and interregional championships.

The first game of the FINS era, the third in total of the history of the Natzionale, was held on 19 March 2019 at the Stadio Franco Frogheri in Nuoro against the Istrangios de Sardigna, a selection formed by the best foreign militants in the Sardinian amateur formations, and won by the Sardinians 7–1. Francesco Virdis from Savona F.B.C. scored a hat-trick, Daniele Molino from Sanremese, Samuele Spano, Toni Gianni and Daniele Bianchi one goal each. For the occasion, over 50 players were called: the professional clubs, however, given the current sporting season, did not give the "go-ahead" for participation. The squad was therefore composed only by amateur players with the exception of two Arzachena Costa Smeralda's players, Robert Acquafresca (FC Sion) and Paolo Dametto (FeralpiSalò) with the latter two sitting on the bench, though.

However, on 6 May 2019, FINS announced the withdrawal from participation in the 2019 CONIFA European Football Cup in Artsakh, accusing the absence of organizational and logistical guarantees to allow the Natzionale, composed by professional players, to face such a demanding trip, deciding to divert the commitment to the organization of the friendly match against Corsica. Despite the abandonment of the event, the federation has guaranteed the permanence in CONIFA.

On 25 January 2020, the FINS, the Sardinian Federation, announced the new coach Vittorio Pusceddu (former defender who played, among all the other teams in his career, for Cagliari Calcio, S.S.C. Napoli, A.C.F. Fiorentina and Torino F.C.) who took the place of Bernardo Mereu after one year of management.

In 2022 the federation planned to compete in 2022 CONIFA European Football Cup and the team was drawn with County of Nice and Two Sicilies, but eventually in May they decide to withdraw from the tournament due to safety reasons and moving to the planning of an International Tournèe against Corsica, Sicily and Malta, with the latter that could be the first UEFA opponent in their history after the first inaugural match against England.

== Colours and crest ==
=== Colours ===
From the FINS era, the main color used is light green, according to the federation "a historical reminder and a wish that Sardinia will return, also in the football field, to a period of cultural and economic prosperity, playing and opening up in first person to the world".

=== Crest ===
The old crest used from 2018 to 2024

The emblem of the Natzionale is a rounded shield with different elements taken from the Sardinian culture. In the upper part, on a green background there is the lettering, in Sardinian language, "Natzionale Sarda de Bòcia". In the main part there are the classic Quattro mori' although with the Saint George's cross in green version instead of red. At the center of the cross then, set in a green pentagon extrapolated from the iconic standard of the soccer ball, a stylized eradicated tree, symbol of the Judicate of Arborea, the last entity representing the independent Sardinia and symbol that still characterizes the coats of arms in the most different variants of more than 80 municipalities of the island.

In 2025 a new, slightly different, version was created. The shape of the tree was designe in a more natural and traditional style, the heads of the Moors were faded away and the lettering on top was shortened to "Natzionale de", leaving the big name "SARDIGNA".

=== Kits ===
In the first match against England in 1990 the Sardinian XI played with a white jersey with blue details and a polo-style collar, while the shorts were red. In the second experience in 1997 the formation used a total red suit with a large flag of the four Moors in the chest. In 2018, with the rebuilding of the National team, the new official jerseys, produced by the made in Sardinia technical sponsor Eye Sportswear, were presented. For the home jersey was chosen a white uniform embellished with green details, colours derived by the Judicate of Arborea and a pattern inspired by the typical embroidery of Sardinian craftsmanship in the central part of the shirt. Meanwhile, for the away jersey, it was decided to a completely red uniform with white lapels, in honor of the flag of the four Moors.

==== Evolution ====
| 1990 | 1997 | 2018– |

== Captains ==
- 1990: Gianfranco Zola
- 1997: Vittorio Pusceddu
- 2019–: Claudio Pani

== Managers ==
- 1990: Mariano Dessì
- 1997: Gustavo Giagnoni
- 2018–2020: Bernardo Mereu
- 2020- : Vittorio Pusceddu

== Competitive record ==
=== CONIFA World Football Cup ===
| Year | Position | P | W | D | L | F | A |
ConIFA World Football Cup
| (Sápmi) 2014 | Not a member of ConIFA | | | | | | |
| (Abkhazia) 2016 | Not a member of ConIFA | | | | | | |
| (Barawa) 2018 | Not a member of ConIFA | | | | | | |
| (North Macedonia) 2020 | Cancelled | | | | | | |
| (Kurdistan Region) 2024 | Did not enter | | | | | | |
| Total | | 0 | 0 | 0 | 0 | 0 | 0 |

=== CONIFA European Football Cup ===
| Year | Position | P | W | D | L | F | A |
ConIFA European Football Cup
| (Hungary) 2015 | Not a member of ConIFA | | | | | | |
| (Northern Cyprus) 2017 | Not a member of ConIFA | | | | | | |
| (Republic of Artsakh) 2019 | Withdrew | | | | | | |
| (County of Nice) 2022 | Withdrew, later cancelled | | | | | | |
| (Northern Cyprus) 2023 | Cancelled | | | | | | |
| Total | | 0 | 0 | 0 | 0 | 0 | 0 |

== Fixtures and results ==
This is a list of results for the matches played since 1990, including friendly matches against full FIFA international teams and others against fellow representative teams which are not aligned to FIFA and against professional or amateur clubs.

| 5 June 1990 Friendly | Sardinia | 2–10 | England | Oristano, Italy |
| | McMahon 1' (o.g.); Tomasso 50' | Report | Webb 7', 33', 41'; Beardsley 65', 75', 85'; Bull 2', 70'; McMahon 80'; Platt 31' | Stadium: Stadio Tharros; Attendance: 2000; Referee: Guzzardo |

| July 1997 Friendly | Sardinia | 1–0 | Corsica | Nuoro, Italy |
| | Zola 65' | Report | | Stadium: Stadio Quadrivio |

| 19 March 2019 Friendly | Sardinia | 7–1 | Istrangios de Sardigna | Nuoro, Italy |
| | Bianchi 1'; Molino 29'; Virdis 59', 75', 78'; Spano 71'; Gianni 83' | Report | Andruetto 68' | Stadium: Stadio Franco Froghieri |

| 2 June 2019 Friendly | Sardinia | 1–1 (1-4 p) | Corsica | Olbia, Italy |
| | Cabeccia 8' | | Cabella 10' | Stadium: Stadio Bruno Nespoli |

| 15 May 2022 Friendly | Torpè | 1–13 | Sardinia | Torpè, Italy |
| | Magrini 90' | Report | Siazzu 10'; Arras 15', 17', 27', 31'; Pinna 34'; Suella 44', 72'; Ligios 54'; Cordeddu 57', 80'; Budroni 74', 84' | Stadium: Campo Sportivo "Tonino Cossu" |

| 10 June 2022 Friendly | Sicily | 4–1 | Sardinia | Mazara del Vallo, Italy |
| 18:45 | Ortisi 31'; Savanarola 54'; Bulevardi 57'; Curiale 83' | Report | Bianco 89' | Stadium: Stadio Nino Vaccara; Attendance: 2,000; Referee: Alessandro Angelo |

| 22 May 2024 Corsica Cup SF | Corsica | 3-0 | Sardinia | Corte, France |
| 19:00 CET (UTC+01:00) | Santelli 8', 32', 60' | Report | | Stadium: Santos-Manfredi |

| 25 May 2024 Corsica Cup 3rd place final | Sicily | 1-0 | Sardinia | Afa, France |
| | Alma 61' | Report |

== Players ==
=== Current squad ===
Below is the list of players called by coach Vittorio Pusceddu for the 2024 Corsica Cup in May 2024 .

Caps, goals and numbers as per 25 May 2024.

| No. | Pos. | Player | Date of birth (age) | Caps | Goals | Club |
|---|---|---|---|---|---|---|
| | GK | Marco Manis | 4 February 1983 (age 43) | 2 | 0 | (Sardinia Football Association) Budoni |
| | GK | Werther Carboni | 4 April 1996 (age 30) | 0 | 0 | (Sardinia Football Association) Latte Dolce |
| | GK | Gabriele Mereu | 24 July 1998 (age 27) | 0 | 0 | (Sardinia Football Association) Tharros |
| | DF | Andrea Congiu | 19 December 1993 (age 32) | 3 | 0 | (Italian Football Federation) Orvietana |
| | DF | Alessio Fadda | 4 October 1995 (age 30) | 1 | 0 | (Sardinia Football Association) Atletico Uri |
| | DF | Fabio Fredrich | 12 February 2002 (age 24) | 1 | 0 | Unattached |
| | DF | Fabio Porru | 3 January 2000 (age 26) | 1 | 0 | (Sardinia Football Association) Monteponi Iglesias |
| | DF | Luca Melis | | 1 | 0 | (Sardinia Football Association) Ghilarza |
| | DF | Matteo Saias | 13 June 1995 (age 31) | 1 | 0 | (Sardinia Football Association) Monastir |
| | DF | Francesco Canu | 12 June 2004 (age 22) | 0 | 0 | (Sardinia Football Association) Latte Dolce |
| | MF | Francesco Bianco | 23 November 2000 (age 25) | 3 | 1 | (Sardinia Football Association) Macomerese Calcio |
| | MF | Andrea Porcheddu | 19 August 1999 (age 26) | 2 | 0 | (Sardinia Football Association) Carbonia |
| | MF | Giovanni Boi | | 1 | 0 | (Sardinia Football Association) Carloforte |
| | MF | Gianluigi Illario | 3 March 2005 (age 21) | 1 | 0 | (Sardinia Football Association) Monteponi Iglesias |
| | MF | Daniele Orro | 20 July 2003 (age 22) | 1 | 0 | (Sardinia Football Association) Ghilarza |
| | MF | Andrea Poli | 9 August 2004 (age 21) | 1 | 0 | (Sardinia Football Association) Ilvamaddalena |
| | MF | Alberto Piras | 2 May 1996 (age 30) | 1 | 0 | (Sardinia Football Association) Monastir |
| | MF | Sandro Scioni | 18 February 1993 (age 33) | 1 | 0 | (Sardinia Football Association) Ferrini Cagliari |
| | MF | Andrea Manca | | 0 | 0 | (Sardinia Football Association) Villasimius |
| | MF | Giovanni Piga | 11 September 2000 (age 25) | 0 | 0 | (Sardinia Football Association) Latte Dolce |
| | FW | Alessio Virdis | 19 November 2000 (age 25) | 2 | 0 | (Sardinia Football Association) Tempio |
| | FW | Alessandro Aloia | 13 July 1996 (age 29) | 1 | 0 | (Sardinia Football Association) COS Sarrabus Ogliastra |
| | FW | Gabriele Dore | 11 June 2001 (age 25) | 1 | 0 | (Sardinia Football Association) Carbonia |

=== Recent call-ups ===
The following players were called up in previous fixtures and are still avavilable for selection.

| Pos. | Player | Date of birth (age) | Caps | Goals | Club | Latest call-up |
|---|---|---|---|---|---|---|
| GK | Andrea Mainas | 26 February 1993 (age 33) | 2 | 0 | (Sardinia) Asseminese | v. Sicily, 22 May 2022 |
| GK | Paolo Pilotto | 21 February 2004 (age 22) | 1 | 0 | Unattached | v. Sicily, 22 May 2022 |
| GK | Giuseppe Ciocci | 24 January 2002 (age 24) | 0 | 0 | (Sardinia) Olbia | v. Torpè 15 May 2022 |
| GK | Marco Ruzittu | 15 June 1991 (age 35) | 2 | 0 | (Sardinia) Arzachena | v. Corsica, 2 June 2019 |
| GK | Mauro Vigorito | 22 May 1990 (age 36) | 0 | 0 | (Italy) Como | v. Corsica, 2 June 2019 |
| GK | Alessandro Lai | 1 January 2000 (age 26) | 1 | 0 | (Sardinia) Latte Dolce | v. Istrangios de Sardigna, 19 March 2019 |
| DF | Simone Pinna | 17 October 1997 (age 28) | 3 | 1 | (Sardinia) Monastir | v. Sicily, 22 May 2022 |
| DF | Antonio Ligios | 10 October 1999 (age 26) | 2 | 1 | (Sardinia) Calangianus | v. Sicily, 22 May 2022 |
| DF | Federico Sirigu | 28 November 2000 (age 25) | 2 | 0 | (Sardinia) Monteponi Iglesias | v. Sicily, 22 May 2022 |
| DF | Ignazio Carta | 18 May 1991 (age 35) | 1 | 0 | (Italy) Terre di Castelli | v. Sicily, 22 May 2022 |
| DF | Riccardo Fancellu | 6 September 2002 (age 23) | 0 | 0 | (Sardinia) Ossese | v. Sicily, 22 May 2022 |
| DF | Andrea Zinellu | 21 November 2002 (age 23) | 1 | 0 | (Sardinia) Ossese | v. Sicily, 22 May 2022 |
| DF | Emerson Ramos Borges | 16 August 1980 (age 45) | 2 | 0 | (Sardinia) Nuorese | v. Torpè 15 May 2022 |
| DF | Simone Varrucciu | 11 September 1992 (age 33) | 1 | 0 | (Sardinia) Budoni | v. Torpè 15 May 2022 |
| DF | Fabio Boi | 29 June 2002 (age 23) | 1 | 0 | (Sardinia) Tharros | v. Torpè 15 May 2022 |
| DF | Fabiano Todde | 28 November 2001 (age 24) | 1 | 0 | (Sardinia) Monteponi Iglesias | v. Torpè 15 May 2022 |
| DF | Marco Cabeccia | 25 May 1987 (age 39) | 2 | 1 | (Sardinia) Latte Dolce | v. Corsica, 2 June 2019 |
| DF | Giampaolo Sirigu | 3 March 1994 (age 32) | 2 | 0 | (Sardinia) Buddusò | v. Corsica, 2 June 2019 |
| DF | Giuseppe Ghiani | 17 June 1999 (age 27) | 0 | 0 | (Italy) Montegiorgio | v. Corsica, 2 June 2019 |
| DF | Mattia Pitzalis | 4 April 2000 (age 26) | 0 | 0 | (Sardinia) Carbonia | v. Corsica, 2 June 2019 |
| DF | Marco Russu | 15 October 1995 (age 30) | 1 | 0 | (Sardinia) Nuorese | v. Istrangios de Sardigna, 19 March 2019 |
| DF | Antonio Usai | 21 July 1993 (age 32) | 1 | 0 | (Sardinia) Tortolì | v. Istrangios de Sardigna, 19 March 2019 |
| DF | Paolo Dametto | 28 June 1993 (age 32) | 0 | 0 | (Sardinia) Torres | v. Istrangios de Sardigna, 19 March 2019 |
| MF | Daniele Molino | 15 January 1987 (age 39) | 3 | 1 | (Sardinia) San Teodoro | v. Sicily, 22 May 2022 |
| MF | Andrea Demontis | 10 January 1995 (age 31) | 1 | 0 | (Sardinia) Muravera - Costa Orientale Sarda | v. Sicily, 22 May 2022 |
| MF | Alessandro Masia | 28 September 1995 (age 30) | 1 | 0 | (Sardinia) Lanusei | v. Sicily, 22 May 2022 |
| MF | Davide Budroni | 12 October 1995 (age 30) | 1 | 2 | (Sardinia) Oschirese | v. Torpè 15 May 2022 |
| MF | Gianmarco Paulis | 20 March 1995 (age 31) | 1 | 0 | (Sardinia) Villacidrese | v. Torpè 15 May 2022 |
| MF | Fabio Occhioni | 11 June 2001 (age 25) | 0 | 0 | (Sardinia) Olbia | v. Torpè 15 May 2022 |
| MF | Alessandro Deiola | 1 August 1995 (age 30) | 1 | 0 | (Sardinia) Cagliari | v. Corsica, 2 June 2019 |
| MF | Daniele Giorico | 1 January 1992 (age 34) | 1 | 0 | (Sardinia) Torres | v. Corsica, 2 June 2019 |
| MF | Pietro Ladu | 2 June 1995 (age 31) | 1 | 0 | (Sardinia) Lanusei | v. Corsica, 2 June 2019 |
| MF | Giuseppe Nuvoli | 16 November 1987 (age 38) | 1 | 0 | (Italy) San Marzano | v. Corsica, 2 June 2019 |
| MF | Toni Gianni | 8 March 1995 (age 31) | 1 | 1 | (Sardinia) Latte Dolce | v. Istrangios de Sardigna, 19 March 2019 |
| MF | Alessandro Masala | 17 November 1996 (age 29) | 1 | 0 | (Sardinia) Latte Dolce | v. Istrangios de Sardigna, 19 March 2019 |
| MF | Stefano Mereu | 8 April 1987 (age 39) | 1 | 0 | (Sardinia) Stintino | v. Istrangios de Sardigna, 19 March 2019 |
| FW | Alessandro Cadau | 1 October 1984 (age 41) | 2 | 0 | (Sardinia) Costa Orientale Sarda | v. Sicily, 22 May 2022 |
| FW | Michele Suella | 9 January 1995 (age 31) | 2 | 2 | (Sardinia) Monteponi Iglesias | v. Sicily, 22 May 2022 |
| FW | Alessio Allegria | 28 July 1995 (age 30) | 1 | 0 | (Belgium) Houtvenne | v. Sicily, 22 May 2022 |
| FW | Michele Fadda | 24 August 1995 (age 30) | 1 | 0 | (Sardinia) Guspini Terralba | v. Sicily, 22 May 2022 |
| FW | Nicola Mereu | 21 June 2001 (age 25) | 1 | 0 | (Sardinia) Muravera - Costa Orientale Sarda | v. Sicily, 22 May 2022 |
| FW | Davide Arras | 2 April 1998 (age 28) | 1 | 4 | (Italy) Pro Palazzolo | v. Torpè 15 May 2022 |
| FW | Mattia Cordeddu | 25 August 1988 (age 37) | 1 | 2 | (Sardinia) Villacidrese | v. Torpè 15 May 2022 |
| FW | Federico Marigosu | 21 April 2001 (age 25) | 1 | 0 | (Italy) Trapani | v. Torpè 15 May 2022 |
| FW | Luca Belloni | 8 May 2003 (age 23) | 0 | 0 | (Sardinia) Olbia | v. Torpè 15 May 2022 |
| FW | Samuele Spano | 7 July 1994 (age 31) | 2 | 1 | (Sardinia) Calangianus | v. Corsica, 2 June 2019 |
| FW | Daniele Ragatzu | 21 September 1991 (age 34) | 0 | 0 | (Sardinia) Olbia | v. Corsica, 2 June 2019 |
| FW | Emanuele Fini | 30 April 2000 (age 26) | 1 | 0 | (Sardinia) Latte Dolce | v. Istrangios de Sardigna, 19 March 2019 |
| FW | Paolo Palmas | 4 August 1993 (age 32) | 1 | 0 | (Sardinia) Latte Dolce | v. Istrangios de Sardigna, 19 March 2019 |
| FW | Nicolò Sanna | 5 September 1999 (age 26) | 1 | 0 | (Italy) Latina | v. Istrangios de Sardigna, 19 March 2019 |

== Individual records ==
As of 10 June 2022, players in bold are still active within the selection.

Most Caps
| Rank | Name | Caps | Goal | Career |
|---|---|---|---|---|
| 1 | **Andrea Congiu** | 3 | 0 | 2019–Present |
| 1 | **Daniele Molino** | 3 | 1 | 2019–Present |
| 1 | **Simone Pinna** | 3 | 1 | 2019–Present |
| 4 | 19 Players | 2 | n.a. | 1990–Present |

Most Goals
| Rank | Name | Goals | Caps | Career |
|---|---|---|---|---|
| 1 | **Davide Arras** | 4 | 1 | 2022–Present |
| 2 | Francesco Virdis | 3 | 2 | 2019–Present |
| 3 | **Davide Budroni** | 2 | 1 | 2022–Present |
| 3 | **Mattia Cordeddu** | 2 | 1 | 2022–Present |
| 5 | **Michele Suella** | 2 | 2 | 2022–Present |
