= 2010 Corsica Football Cup =

Tournament details
- Host country: France
- Dates: 19 – 21 May
- Teams: 4
- Venue: 2

Final positions
- Champions: Corsica (1st title)
- Runners-up: Gabon
- Third place: Brittany

Tournament statistics
- Matches played: 4
- Goals scored: 10 (2.5 per match)
- Top scorer: (Gabon) Fabrice Do Marcolino

The 2010 Corsica Football Cup was a Non-FIFA football competition hosted by the independent national team Corsica. Games were played at AC Ajaccio's ground Stade François Coty and SC Bastia ground Stade Armand Cesari. Four teams played, Gabon, Togo, Brittany and Corsica.

On 21 May 2010, Corsica won the "Corsica Football Cup" at Penalty shoot-out against Gabon with the score of 1–1, (pen. 5–4).

== Participants ==
- Corsica
- Brittany
- Gabon
- Togo

== Results ==
Semi-finals
19 May
Corsica	2
Brittany	0
19 May
Gabon	3
Togo	0

Final
21 May
Corsica (pen)	1 (5)
Gabon	1 (4)
Third place
21 May
Brittany	2
Togo	1

=== Semifinals ===
19 May 2010

Corsica	2–0	Brittany
Tiberi 45'; Mandrichi 60'	Report

Stade François Coty, Ajaccio

19 May 2010

Gabon	3–0	Togo
Aubameyang 16'; Labo 27' (o.g.); Do Marcolino 84'	Report

Stade François Coty, Ajaccio

=== Third place match ===
21 May 2010

Brittany	2–1	Togo
Guéguan 65'; Le Hénaff 75'	Report	Abraw 55'

Stade Armand Cesari, Bastia

=== Final ===
21 May 2010

Corsica	1–1	Gabon
Berenguer 51'	Report	Do Marcolino 82'
Penalties
	5–4

Stade Armand Cesari, Bastia

2010 Corsica Football Cup

Corsica
First title

== Statistics ==
=== Goalscorers ===
There were 10 goals scored in 4 matches, for an average of 2.5 goals per match.

2 goals

- (Gabon) Fabrice Do Marcolino

1 goal

- (Brittany) Olivier Guégan
- (Brittany) Cédric Le Hénaff
- (Corsica) Pascal Berenguer
- (Corsica) Damien Tibéri
- (Corsica) Jean-Jacques Mandrichi
- (Togo) Camaldine Abraw
- (Gabon) Pierre-Emerick Aubameyang

1 own goal

- (Togo) Ousseni Labo (against Gabon)
