= Brittany national football team =

Brittany
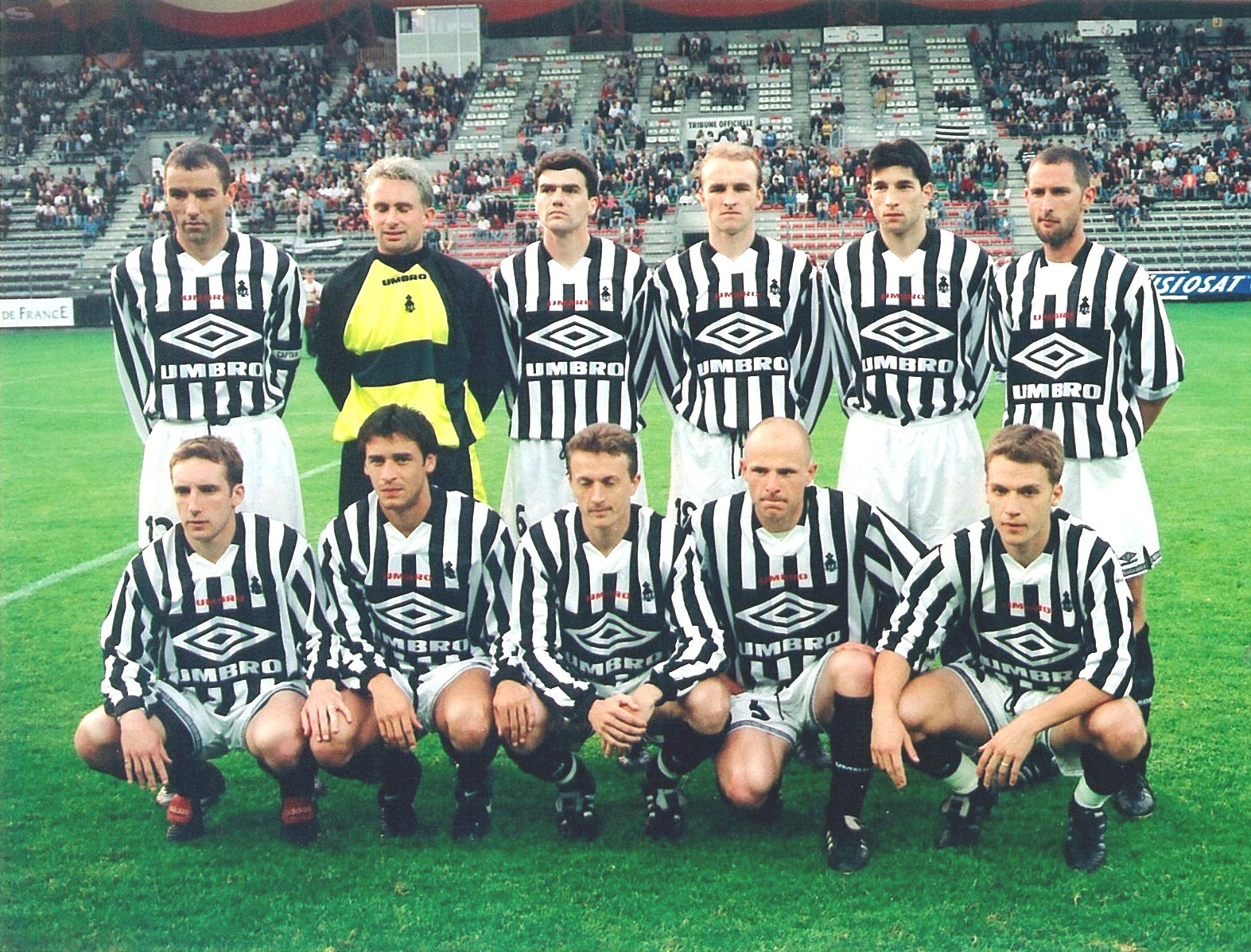
- Nickname(s): The Black Devils; Les Diables Noirs; An Du Diaouloù
- Association: Breton Football Association (BFA)
- Head coach: Raymond Domenech
First colours	Second colours

First international
- Brittany 1–0 Luxembourg (Rennes, France; 12 March 1922)

Biggest win
- Brittany 4–1 Luxembourg (Esch-sur-Alzette, Luxembourg; 11 February 1923)

Biggest defeat
- Brittany 1–5 Norway (Rennes, France; 1 November 1923)

The Brittany national football team (French: Équipe de Bretagne de football, Breton: Skipailh Breizh) is the representative football team of Brittany, France. It is administered by the Breton Football Association (BFA). Brittany is neither affiliated to FIFA nor UEFA but is characterised as one of the six Celtic nations. Its games are held under the auspices of the French Football Federation and FIFA Regulations Amateur football in Brittany is administered by both the Ligue de Bretagne and the Ligue des Pays de Loire, which are regional associations within the French FA.

== Squad selection ==
Brittany plays unofficial internationals. Eligibility to play for the Breton team is strict, as the players (or their parents or grandparents) must have been born within the Breton territory. The BFA has a pool of around 100 players in the first three professional divisions to choose from, some of them with proven international football experience. Those who have played for the Breton side include the likes of Christian Gourcuff, Paul Le Guen, Yann Kermorgant. Brittany's Stéphane Guivarc'h won the 1998 World Cup with France.

== History ==
Given their strong sense of cultural separatism from the rest of France, Brittany formed a Breton XI football team, that competed at various points throughout the 20th century, playing against the likes of Luxembourg and Norway. The Breton team made their debut at the Roazhon Park in Rennes in 1922, defeating Luxembourg 1-0.

The Breton Football Association (BFA) was formalized on 18 July 1997, and shortly after they brought together Breton professional footballers to form a representative football team of Brittany. Following the support from Fernand Sastre and Michel Platini (co-presidents of the French Organizing Committee for the 1998 World Cup), the Brittany team was set up with the aim to offer a warm-up game to the 1998 WC qualified national teams, and therefore, they played their first official game against Cameroon on 21 May 1998 (two weeks before the start of the tournament) at Roazhon Park in Rennes, and a Breton side featuring Paul Le Guen surprised, as they notably hold the Cameroonian to a 1-1 draw, thanks to an equalizing goal from Guingampais Rouxel just before the break. Six games had to be called off between 1999 and 2005 because of the then French FA administration, which contradicted its own rules. The head of the French FA administration changed and BFA finally recovered in order to fully resume its activities in 2008. Two years later, in 2010, Brittany participated in the 2010 Corsica Football Cup, where they were knocked out in the semi-finals by the hosts and eventual champions, Corsica, however, they managed to salvage same pride by defeating Togo in the third place match. Its latest game was played versus Mali (1–0) on 28 May 2013.

== Celtic Cup Ambitions ==
BFA offered other Celtic nations to join in a Celtic Nations Championship between 1985 and 1987. On 9 September 1985, BFA Secretary Fañch Gaume, visiting Cardiff on the eve of a World Cup qualifier between Wales and Scotland, sounded both the FA of Wales and the Scottish FA about participation to a Celtic Nations Cup. Informal conversations were followed up by correspondence and further personal exchanges, whenever the opportunity presented itself before international games.

While Wales showed a genuine interest, the offer finally fell on barren ground with Scotland. Rejection letters from the SFA for non-entry stated the difficulties to find suitable dates but, as the sports editor of "The Glasgow Herald" Jim Reynolds presented it: "It is just two years since England and Scotland broke up the British International Championship by calling a halt to regular games featuring Northern Ireland and Wales. So, the chances of a Celtic Championship involving Scotland must be remote."

Brittany recently renewed its claims to organise and take part in the new Celtic Nations Cup with the Republic of Ireland, Scotland and Wales by 2015 at the earliest or 2017.

== Internationals ==
Date	Venue	Home team	Away team	Score
12 March 1922	Rennes	Brittany	Luxembourg	1–0
11 February 1923	Esch-sur-Alzette	Luxembourg	Brittany	1–4
1 November 1923	Rennes	Brittany	Norway	1–5
23 March 1924	Rennes	Brittany	Luxembourg	1–1
22 February 1925	Luxembourg	Luxembourg	Brittany	1–1
10 April 1938	Brest	Brittany	Germany XI	called off
23 April 1939	Brest	Brittany	Luxembourg	3–1
30 December 1988	Brest	Brittany	United States	6–2 (indoor)
21 May 1998	Rennes	Brittany	Cameroon	1–1
25 May 1999	Nantes	Brittany	Republic of Ireland	called off °
30 May 2000	Nantes	Brittany	Romania	called off °
20 March 2001	Angers	Brittany	Cuba	called off °
22 May 2001	Lorient	Brittany	Morocco	called off °
31 August 2001	Lorient	Brittany	Latvia	called off °
June 2003	-	Brittany	New Zealand	called off °
20 May 2008	Saint-Brieuc	Brittany	Congo	3–1
19 May 2010	Ajaccio	Corsica	Brittany	2–0
21 May 2010	Bastia	Brittany	Togo	2–1
2 June 2011	Saint-Nazaire	Brittany	Equatorial Guinea	0–1
28 May 2013	Nantes	Brittany	Mali	1–0
20 May 2014	Vannes	Brittany	Central African Republic	called off
22 May 2016	Lomé	Togo	Brittany	cancelled

° game agreed but not played because of then French FA administration (1999–2005).

== Managers ==
- 1988: Jean-Louis Lamour and Marc Rastoll
- 1998: Georges Eo and René Le Lamer
- 2000/2008: Serge Le Dizet
- 2010: Philippe Bergeroo
- 2011: Michel Audrain
- 2014: Jacques Santini
- 2016: Raymond Domenech and Michel Audrain

== Capped Players ==
To be included in the Breton squad, according to FIFA national teams rules, it is eligible a player: - born into one of five historical Breton departments. - with parents from Brittany. - with grandparents from Brittany - grown up in Brittany since the age of seven.

Opponents: Cm (Cameroon), Cg (Republic of Congo), Cs (Corsica), Gq (Equatorial Guinea), Oi (Nantes 'Ouest Indoor' Tournament), Tg (Togo), Us (USA).

- Pierre-Yves André (1998 Cam)
- Olivier Baudry (1998 Cam)
- Pierre-Yves Bégot (2011 Gq)
- Ronan Biger (2011 Gq)
- Philippe Billy (2008 Cg)
- Jean-Pierre Bosser (1988 Us)
- David Bouard (2011 Gq)
- Bernard Bouger (1998 Cm)
- Mathieu Bouyer (2010 Cs, Tg)
- Vincent Briant (2010 Cs, Tg, 2011 Gq)
- Philippe Brinquin (1998 Cm)
- Mickaël Buzaré (2008 Cg, 2010 Cs, Tg)
- Mickaël Caradec (2011 Gq)
- Jean-Christophe Cesto (2010 Cs, Tg, 2011 Gq)
- Joël Cloarec (1988 Us)
- Patrick Colleter (1988 Us)
- Pierre-Yves David (1998 Cm, 2000 Oi)
- Fabien Debray (2011 Gq)
- Thomas Deniaud (2000 Oi)
- Loïc Druon (1998 Cm)
- Julien Féret (2010 Cs)
- David Garcion (1998 Cm)
- Fabrice Garin (2000 Oi, 2008 Cg)
- Pierre Goaziou (2010 Cs, Tg)
- Christian Gourcuff (1988 Us)
- Olivier Guegan (2008 Cg, 2010 Cs, Tg)
- Frédéric Gueguen (1998 Cm)
- Olivier Guéguen (2011 Gq)
- Laurent Guyot (2000 Oi)
- Nicolas Haquin (2008 Cg)
- Laurent Hervé (2000 Oi, 2008 Cg)
- Tony Heurtebis (1998 Cm)
- Laurent Huard (1998 Cm)
- Maël Illien (2011 Gq)
- Gilles Kerhuiel (2000 Oi)
- Jean-Yves Kerjean (1988 Us)
- Julien Lachuer (2008 Cg)
- Yann Lachuer (2008 Cg)
- Pascal Laguillier (1988 Us)
- Nicolas Laspalles (1998 Cm, 2000 Oi)
- Vincent Le Baron (2011 Gq)
- Serge Le Dizet (1998 Cm)
- Anthony Le Gall (2010 Cs, Tg)
- Stéphane Le Garrec (1988 Us)
- Paul Le Guen (1998 Cm)
- Philippe Le Guern (1988 Us)
- Cédric Le Henaff (2010 Cs, Tg)
- Arnaud Le Lan (2011 Gq)
- Vincent Le Mat (2011 Gq)
- Christophe Le Roux (1998 Cm)
- Jérémy Le Sourne (2011 Gq)
- Jérôme Lebouc (2008 Cg)
- Eric Loussouarn (2000 Oi)
- Corentin Martins (1988 Us)
- Pascal Mellaza (1988 Us)
- Claude Michel (1998 Cm)
- Guillaume Moullec (2008 Cg, 2010 Cs, Tg, 2011 Gq)
- Stéphane Pédron (1998 Cm)
- Romain Poletti (2008 Cg, 2010 Cs, Tg, 2011 Gq)
- Yvon Pouliquen (1988 Us)
- Sylvain Prat (2000 Oi)
- Erwan Quintin (2008 Cg)
- Farid Raïs (2011 Gq)
- Christophe Revel (2008 Cg)
- Vincent Richetin (2008 Cg)
- Fabien Robert (2008 Cg)
- Antony Robic (2010 Cs, Tg)
- Lionel Rouxel (1998 Cm, 2000 Oi)
- Ronan Salaün (1988 Cm)
- Steve Savidan (2000 Oi)
- Denis Stéphan (1988 Us)
- Pierre Talmont (2008 Cg, 2010 Cs, Tg)
- Romain Thomas (2008 Cg, 2010 Cs, Tg, 2011 Gq)
- Philippe Tibeuf (1988 Us)
- Laurent Viaud (1998 Cm)

Last-minute defections through injury or illness:

- 1998: Sylvain Ripoll, Ronan Salaün
- 2000: Claude Michel
- 2008: Mathieu Bouyer, Romain Danzé, Yoann Gourcuff, Fabien Lemoine
- 2010: Hassan Ahamada, Étienne Didot, Jérémy Menez, Fabien Robert
- 2011: Florent Besnard, Mathieu Bouyer

== Notable players ==
Breton footballers who represented FIFA national teams

=== Men's internationals ===
- Players in **bold** have won the FIFA World Cup
- Players in underlined have won a continental championships

Angola

- Julien Ponceau

Argentina

- Gonzalo Higuain

Cambodia

- Dani Kouch

Cameroon

- Guy N'dy Assembé
- Georges-Kévin Nkoudou

Comoros

- Chaker Alhadhur

DR Congo

- Pépé Bonet

Equatorial Guinea

- Santiago Eneme

France

- Loïc Amisse
- Tiémoué Bakayoko
- Bruno Baronchelli
- Jean Batmale
- Charles Berthelot
- Bernard Blanchet
- Louis Cardiet
- Eduardo Camavinga
- Antoine Cuissard
- Patrick Delamontagne
- Jean-Paul Bertrand-Demanes
- Ousmane Dembélé
- **Marcel Desailly**
- Désiré Doué
- Léo Dubois
- Daniel Eon
- Jean-Michel Ferri
- Pierre Flamion
- Louis Floch
- Kevin Gameiro
- Nicolas Gillet
- Philippe Gondet
- Yoann Gourcuff
- Jocelyn Gourvennec
- Matteo Guendouzi
- Jean-Marc Guillou
- **Stéphane Guivarc'h**
- Pierrick Hiard
- Raymond Keruzoré
- Randal Kolo Muani
- Mickaël Landreau
- Gilbert Le Chenadec
- Paul Le Guen
- Yvon Le Roux
- Robert Lemaître
- Marcel Loncle
- Corentin Martins
- Jérémy Ménez
- Yann M'Vila
- Nicolas Ouédec
- Armand Penverne
- Jean Prouff
- Ulrich Ramé
- Robert Rico
- Steve Savidan
- Yannick Stopyra
- Alex Thépot
- Philippe Tibeuf
- Jérémy Toulalan
- Adrien Truffert
- Jordan Veretout
- Jean Vincent
- Sylvain Wiltord
- Stéphane Ziani

Gabon

- Alan Do Marcolino

Guadeloupe

- Claudio Beauvue
- Dimitri Foulquier

Guinea

- Mouctar Diakhaby
- Larsen Touré

Haiti

- Mikaël Cantave

Hungary

- Loïc Négo

Ivory Coast

- Emerse Faé
- Giovanni Sio

Madagascar

- Jérôme Mombris
- Jérémy Morel

Mali

- Abdoulaye Doucouré

Martinique

- Joris Marveaux
- Kévin Théophile-Catherine

Mauritius

- Lindsay Rose

Morocco

- Abdelhamid Aït Boudlal
- Amine Harit
- Imran Louza

Niger

- Délis Ahou

Norway

- Yann-Erik de Lanlay

Senegal

- Abdoulaye Diallo

Spain

- Robin Le Normand

Togo

- Josué Homawoo

Tunisia

- Mohamed Larbi

=== Women's internationals ===
- Léa Abadou
- Camille Abily
- Salma Amani
- Ghislaine Baron
- Gaëlle Blouin
- Hillary Diaz
- Samia Fikri
- Anne Gouëzel
- Sonia Haziraj
- Hélène Hillion-Guillemin
- Océane Hurtré
- Françoise Jézéquel
- Sylvie Josset
- Corinne Kerouredan
- Clarisse Le Bihan
- Isabelle Le Boulch
- Isabelle Le Denmat
- Marine Le Diodic
- Anaële Le Moguédec
- Margaux Le Mouël
- Eugénie Le Sommer
- Charlotte Lorgeré
- Clara Matéo
- Griedge Mbock Bathy
- Jade Nassi
- Françoise Paulhac
- Lydie Perraudeau
- Véronique Sourdin
- Corinne Suchodolski

== Image gallery ==
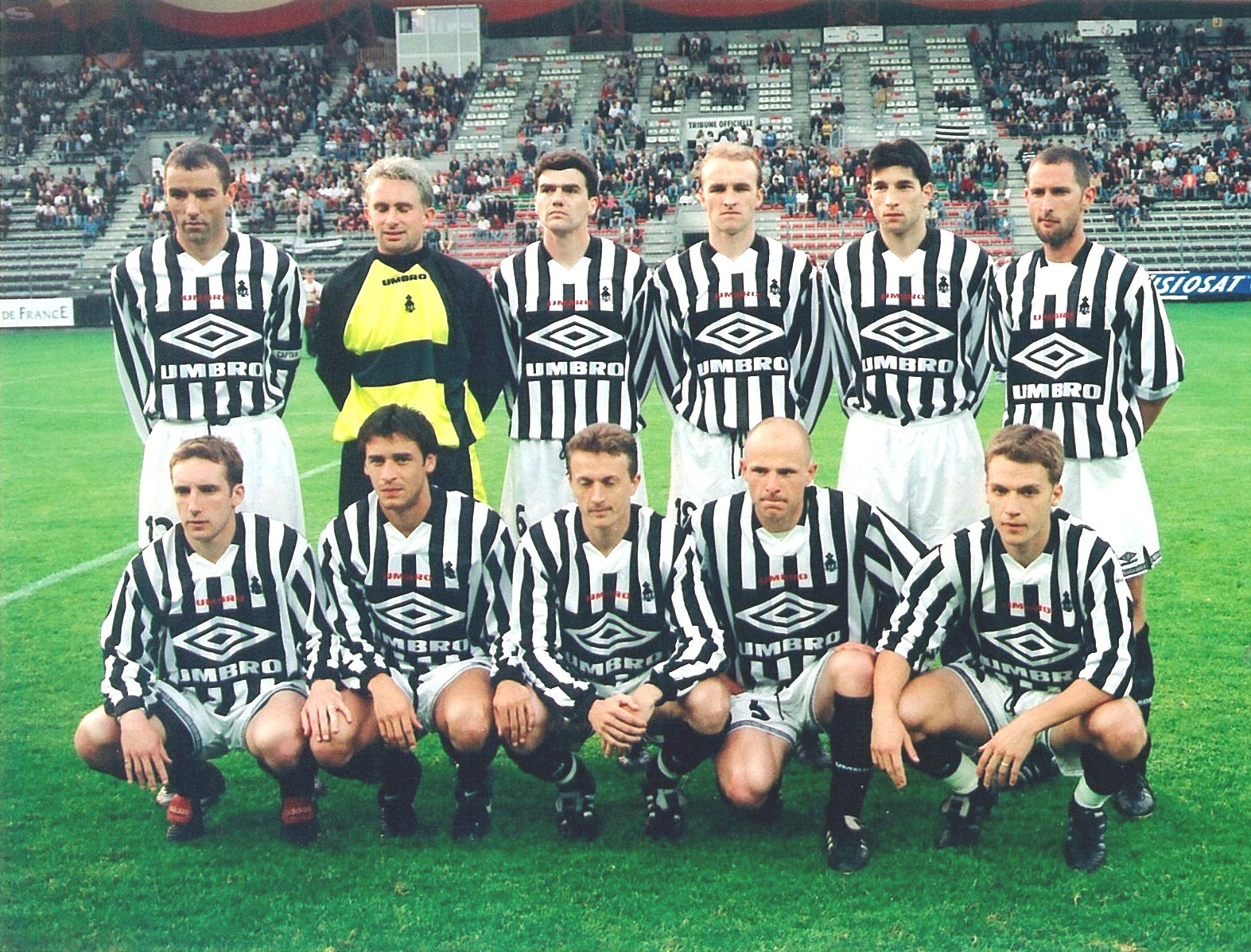
Brittany, captained by Paul Le Guen, in a match against Cameroon in 1998

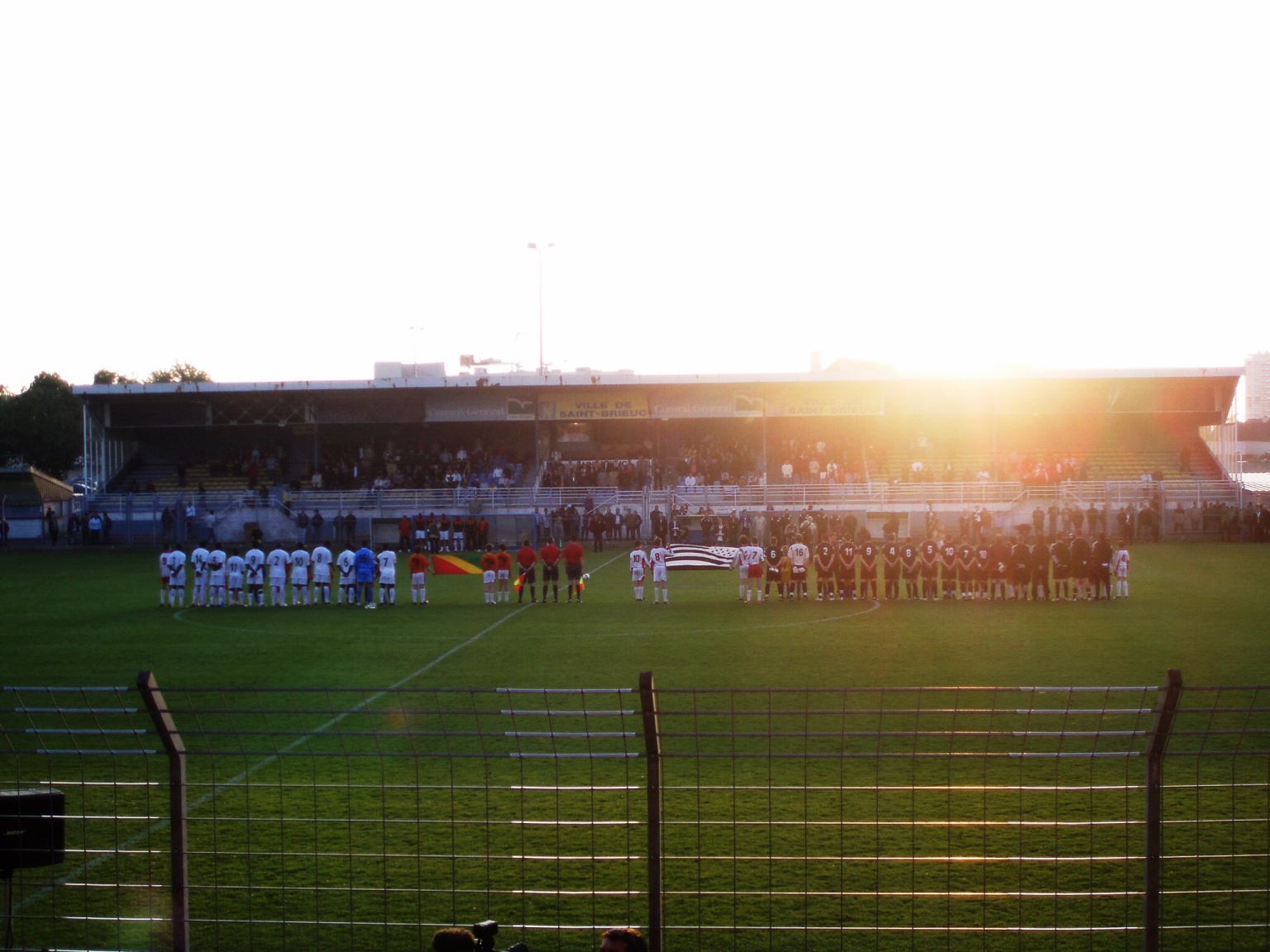
Brittany in a match against Congo at Stade Fred Aubert, Saint-Brieuc, in 2008
