= 2001–02 Stade Lavallois season =

Season of a football league in France

Stade Lavallois
2001–02 season
- French Division 2: 10th
- Coupe de France: Round of 32
- Coupe de la Ligue: Round of 32

The 2001–02 season was the 100th season in the existence of Stade Lavallois and the club's third consecutive season in the second division of French football. In addition to the domestic league, Stade Lavallois competed in this season's edition of the Coupe de France and Coupe de la Ligue. The season covered the period from 1 July 2001 to 30 June 2002.

== Players ==
=== First-team squad ===
Note: Flags indicate national team as defined under FIFA eligibility rules; some limited exceptions apply. Players may hold more than one non-FIFA nationality.

No.	Pos.	Nation	Player
—	GK	FRA	Jérôme Hiaumet
—	GK	FRA	Christophe Gardié
—	DF	FRA	Samuel Neva
—	DF	FRA	Yoann Bourillon
—	DF	FRA	Mounir Soufiani
—	DF	FRA	Stéphane Moreau
—	DF	FRA	Régis Le Bris
—	DF	FRA	Aurélien Nattes
—	DF	FRA	Mickaël Buzaré
—	DF	FRA	Philippe Cuervo
—	MF	FRA	Laurent Viaud
—	MF	SEN	Rémi Gomis
—	MF	FRA	Christophe Cazarelly

No.	Pos.	Nation	Player
—	MF	SEN	Issa Ba
—	MF	FRA	Eric Crosnier
—	MF	FRA	David Le Frapper
—	MF	FRA	Franck Haise
—	MF	COD	Gonzala N'Tumpa N'Safu
—	MF	FRA	Jérôme Monier
—	FW	FRA	Lionel Rouxel
—	FW	FRA	Lionel Prat
—	FW	GLP	Richard Socrier
—	FW	MTQ	Mickaël Citony
—	FW	MLI	Dramane Coulibaly
—	FW	FRA	Guilhermo Mauricio
—	FW	FRA	Miguel Mussard

== Competitions ==
Win Draw Loss

=== Overall record ===
Competition	First match	Last match	Starting round	Final position	Record							
Competition	First match	Last match	Starting round	Final position	Pld	W	D	L	GF	GA	GD	Win %
Division 2	28 July 2001	3 May 2002	Matchday 1	10th	38	14	8	16	50	56	−6	36.84
Coupe de France	November 2001	TBD	Seventh round	Round of 32	4	3	1	0	11	1	+10	75.00
Coupe de la Ligue	September 2001	TBD	First round	Round of 32	2	1	0	1	1	3	−2	50.00
Total					44	18	9	17	62	60	+2	40.91

Source: Competitions

=== French Division 2 ===
==== League table ====
Pos	Team	Pld	W	D	L	GF	GA	GD	Pts
8	Châteauroux	38	15	8	15	41	42	−1	53
9	Nancy	38	12	15	11	42	38	+4	51
10	Laval	38	14	8	16	50	56	−6	50
11	Niort	38	11	15	12	40	39	+1	48
12	Amiens	38	11	14	13	46	50	−4	47

Source: Ligue 2

==== Results summary ====
Overall								Home						Away					
Pld	W	D	L	GF	GA	GD	Pts	W	D	L	GF	GA	GD	W	D	L	GF	GA	GD
38	14	8	16	50	56	−6	50	9	3	7	28	22	+6	5	5	9	22	34	−12

Source: Ligue 2

==== Results by round ====
Round	1	2	3	4	5	6	7	8	9	10	11	12	13	14	15	16	17	18	19	20	21	22	23	24	25	26	27	28	29	30	31	32	33	34	35	36	37	38
Ground	A	H	H	A	H	A	H	A	H	A	H	A	H	A	H	A	H	A	H	A	A	H	A	H	A	H	A	H	A	H	A	H	A	H	A	H	A	H
Result	L	W	L	L	W	L	L	L	W	W	W	W	D	D	W	D	L	L	D	D	D	W	L	L	W	W	W	L	D	W	L	D	L	W	W	L	L	L
Position	15	6	12	15	12	16	18	18	14	13	10	8	9	9	8	8	9	10	11	12	12	12	12	14	13	10	7	9	10	8	8	8	8	8	8	9	9	10

Source: Ligue 2
A = Away; H = Home; W = Win; D = Draw; L = Loss

==== Matches ====
	Laval	v	Ajaccio	Laval
--:-- CEST (UTC+2)				Stadium: Stade Francis Le Basser

	Ajaccio	v	Laval	Ajaccio
--:-- CEST (UTC+2)				Stadium: Stade François Coty

	Laval	v	Amiens	Laval
--:-- CEST (UTC+2)				Stadium: Stade Francis Le Basser

	Amiens	v	Laval	Amiens
--:-- CEST (UTC+2)				Stadium: Stade de la Licorne

	Laval	v	Beauvais	Laval
--:-- CEST (UTC+2)				Stadium: Stade Francis Le Basser

	Beauvais	v	Laval	Beauvais
--:-- CEST (UTC+2)				Stadium: Stade Pierre Brisson

	Laval	v	Caen	Laval
--:-- CEST (UTC+2)				Stadium: Stade Francis Le Basser

	Caen	v	Laval	Caen
--:-- CEST (UTC+2)				Stadium: Stade Michel d'Ornano

	Laval	v	Châteauroux	Laval
--:-- CEST (UTC+2)				Stadium: Stade Francis Le Basser

	Châteauroux	v	Laval	Châteauroux
--:-- CEST (UTC+2)				Stadium: Stade Gaston-Petit

	Laval	v	Créteil	Laval
--:-- CEST (UTC+2)				Stadium: Stade Francis Le Basser

	Créteil	v	Laval	Créteil
--:-- CEST (UTC+2)				Stadium: Stade Dominique Duvauchelle

	Laval	v	Grenoble	Laval
--:-- CEST (UTC+2)				Stadium: Stade Francis Le Basser

	Grenoble	v	Laval	Grenoble
--:-- CEST (UTC+2)				Stadium: Stade Lesdiguières

	Laval	v	Gueugnon	Laval
--:-- CEST (UTC+2)				Stadium: Stade Francis Le Basser

	Gueugnon	v	Laval	Gueugnon
--:-- CEST (UTC+2)				Stadium: Stade Jean Laville

	Laval	v	Istres	Laval
--:-- CEST (UTC+2)				Stadium: Stade Francis Le Basser

	Istres	v	Laval	Istres
--:-- CEST (UTC+2)				Stadium: Stade Bernard Bardin

	Laval	v	Le Havre	Laval
--:-- CEST (UTC+2)				Stadium: Stade Francis Le Basser

	Le Havre	v	Laval	Le Havre
--:-- CEST (UTC+2)				Stadium: Stade Jules Deschaseaux

	Laval	v	Le Mans	Laval
--:-- CEST (UTC+2)				Stadium: Stade Francis Le Basser

	Le Mans	v	Laval	Le Mans
--:-- CEST (UTC+2)				Stadium: Stade Léon-Bollée

	Laval	v	Martigues	Laval
--:-- CEST (UTC+2)				Stadium: Stade Francis Le Basser

	Martigues	v	Laval	Martigues
--:-- CEST (UTC+2)				Stadium: Stade Francis Turcan

	Laval	v	Nancy	Laval
--:-- CEST (UTC+2)				Stadium: Stade Francis Le Basser

	Nancy	v	Laval	Tomblaine
--:-- CEST (UTC+2)				Stadium: Stade Marcel Picot

	Laval	v	Nice	Laval
--:-- CEST (UTC+2)				Stadium: Stade Francis Le Basser

	Nice	v	Laval	Nice
--:-- CEST (UTC+2)				Stadium: Stade du Ray

	Laval	v	Nîmes	Laval
--:-- CEST (UTC+2)				Stadium: Stade Francis Le Basser

	Nîmes	v	Laval	Nîmes
--:-- CEST (UTC+2)				Stadium: Stade des Costières

	Laval	v	Niort	Laval
--:-- CEST (UTC+2)				Stadium: Stade Francis Le Basser

	Niort	v	Laval	Niort
--:-- CEST (UTC+2)				Stadium: Stade René Gaillard

	Laval	v	Saint-Étienne	Laval
--:-- CEST (UTC+2)				Stadium: Stade Francis Le Basser

	Saint-Étienne	v	Laval	Saint-Étienne
--:-- CEST (UTC+2)				Stadium: Stade Geoffroy-Guichard

	Laval	v	Strasbourg	Laval
--:-- CEST (UTC+2)				Stadium: Stade Francis Le Basser

	Strasbourg	v	Laval	Strasbourg
--:-- CEST (UTC+2)				Stadium: Stade de la Meinau

	Laval	v	Wasquehal	Laval
--:-- CEST (UTC+2)				Stadium: Stade Francis Le Basser

	Wasquehal	v	Laval	Villeneuve-d'Ascq
--:-- CEST (UTC+2)				Stadium: Stadium Lille Métropole

=== Coupe de la Ligue ===
1 September 2001 First round	Laval	1–0	Beauvais	Laval
--:-- CEST (UTC+2)				Stadium: Stade Francis Le Basser

1 December 2001 Round of 32	Laval	0–3	Auxerre	Laval
--:-- CET (UTC+1)				Stadium: Stade Francis Le Basser

== Statistics ==
=== Squad statistics ===
No.	Pos	Nat	Player	Total		Division 2		Coupe de France		Coupe de la Ligue			
No.	Pos	Nat	Player	Apps	Goals	Apps	Goals	Apps	Goals	Apps	Goals		
Goalkeepers
1	GK	(France) FRA		0	0	0	0	0	0	0	0	0	0
1	GK	(France) FRA		0	0	0	0	0	0	0	0	0	0
Defenders
1	DF	(France) FRA		0	0	0	0	0	0	0	0	0	0
1	DF	(France) FRA		0	0	0	0	0	0	0	0	0	0
Midfielders
1	MF	(France) FRA		0	0	0	0	0	0	0	0	0	0
1	MF	(France) FRA		0	0	0	0	0	0	0	0	0	0
Forwards
1	FW	(France) FRA		0	0	0	0	0	0	0	0	0	0
1	FW	(France) FRA		0	0	0	0	0	0	0	0	0	0
Players who have made an appearance or had a squad number this season but have left the club
1	GK	(France) FRA		0	0	0	0	0	0	0	0	0	0

=== Goalscorers ===
Rank	No.	Pos	Nat	Name	Division 2	Coupe de France	Coupe de la Ligue	Total	
1	1	FW	(France)		0	0	0	0	
2	2	MF	(France)		0	0	0	0	
2	Totals					0	0	0	0
