= Jean-Michel Cavalli =

French footballer (born 1957)

Personal information
- Date of birth: 13 July 1957 (age 69)
- Place of birth: Ajaccio, France
- Height: 1.68 m (5 ft 6 in)
- Position: Midfielder

Team information
- Current team: Prishtina (manager)

Senior career*
Years	Team	Apps	(Gls)
1971–1975	Gazélec Ajaccio		
1975–1976	Monaco		
1976–1977	Boulogne-Billancourt		
1977–1978	CSM Puteaux		
1978–1979	FC Solenzara		
1979–1990	Gazélec Ajaccio		

Managerial career
- 1990–1991: Gazélec Ajaccio
- 1994: Al-Nassr
- 1994–1995: Lille (assistant)
- 1995–1997: Lille
- 1997–1998: Al-Riyadh
- 1998–1999: Gazélec Ajaccio
- 2000: Gazélec Ajaccio
- 2000–2001: RC Paris
- 2002: Ionikos
- 2003–2005: US Créteil
- 2005–2006: Triestina
- 2006–2007: Algeria
- 2007–2008: Wydad AC
- 2008–2010: Nîmes
- 2009: Corsica
- 2012–2013: Gazélec Ajaccio
- 2014–2015: MC Oran
- 2015–2016: Al-Hilal Omdurman
- 2016: USM Alger
- 2017: Al-Ittihad Alexandria
- 2019: MC Oran
- 2020–2023: Niger
- 2024: Club Africain
- 2024–: Prishtina
- * Club domestic league appearances and goals

Jean-Michel Cavalli (born 13 July 1957) is a French and Corsican football manager and former player who is the manager of Kosovo Superleague club Prishtina.

== Playing career ==
Cavalli started his playing career at the now-defunct Gazélec Ajaccio in 1971, also turning out for Corsican sides Bastia SCB (1977–78) and Solenzara (1978–79) before a second spell at Gazélec. In that second spell, Cavalli would spend five years as club captain.

== Managerial career ==
In his final few years as a player, the club hierarchy at Gazélec encouraged Cavalli to shadow then head coach Guy Calléja. In 1990, when Calléja was unable to continue in the role, Cavalli was promoted to manager - overseeing both the professionalisation of the football club and ensuring that Gazélec were able to stay in Division 2 in a period of great transition.

His first taste of international management would take place when he took charge of Algeria in 2005. Cavalli coached the Corsica national team, not affiliated with FIFA or UEFA, in a 2009 friendly against Congo.

While working as a commentator on the 2026 FIFA World Cup, Cavalli confirmed his current status as a free agent but revealed that he was in advanced negotiations regarding potential managerial positions with two national teams alongside several clubs.

== Personal life ==
Jean-Michel Cavalli comes from a family which had a history of professional football players. His uncle, Jean Cavalli, won the 1935 Coupe de France with Olympique de Marseille, primarily as a rotational player. His son is the former professional football player Johan Cavalli, who is the current Sporting Director at AC Ajaccio. When Jean-Michel took the reins of the Corsican national team in 2009, Johan was one of the players in the starting XI.
