= Bouyer =

Bouyer is a surname, and may refer to:

- Franck Bouyer (born 1974), French bicycle racer
- Jean G. Bouyer (1891–1926), French World War I flying ace
- Jules Bouyer (born 2002), French diver
- Louis Bouyer (1913–2004), French Lutheran minister and scholar
- Marcel Bouyer (1920–2000), French politician
- Mathieu Bouyer (born 1987), French football player
- Mitch Bouyer (1837–1876), interpreter and guide for General Custer
- Patricia Bouyer-Decitre (born 1976), French computer scientist
- Reynold Gideon Bouyer (1741–1826), archdeacon of Northumberland
