= Corsica national football team =

Unofficial football team for the island of Corsica, France

Corsica
- Association: Ligue Corse de Football (LCF)
- Head coach: Yannick Cahuzac
First colours	Second colours

First international
- France 0–2 Corsica (Marseille, France; 28 February 1967)

Biggest win
- Guadeloupe 0–3 Corsica (Fort-de-France, Martinique; 5 June 2018); Corsica 3–0 Sardinia (Corte, Corsica; 22 May 2024)

Biggest defeat
- Martinique 5–1 Corsica (Fort-de-France, Martinique; 7 June 2018)

The Corsica national football team (Corsican: Squadra Corsa di Balò) is the unofficial football team for the island of Corsica, France. It is not affiliated with FIFA or UEFA. The selection has played against national teams thirteen times.

In the past, the selection has also played against club teams, as in 1963 against Stade Reims, or Inter Milan in 2012.

The match against Congo was organized by the CFA (Corsica Football Association). In order to be called up for the team, a player had to fulfil two conditions: having at least one parent or grandparent from Corsica and being a professional player or being part of a professional club.

== Venue of the team ==
The venue of the selection is not fixed : Corsica has played in both of the major cities of the island, Bastia and Ajaccio. It has been said that from now on, the matches will be played alternatively in Bastia (Stade Armand Cesari) and in Ajaccio (either Stade Ange Casanova or Stade François Coty).

== Team ==
=== Current squad ===
The following players were called up for the 2024 Corsica Cup, a friendly tournament against Sardinia, Sicily and Saint Martin to be played on 22, 23 and 25 May 2024.

Caps and goals as of 25 May 2024, after the game against Saint Martin

No.	Pos.	Player	Date of birth (age)	Caps	Goals	Club
1	GK	Ghjuvanni Quilichini	1 September 2002 (age 24)	2	0	(Corsica Football Association) Ajaccio
16	GK	Francois-Joseph Sollacaro	21 March 1994 (age 32)	3	0	(Corsica Football Association) Ajaccio
30	GK	Sacha Contena	4 October 2005 (age 20)	1	0	(Corsica Football Association) Bastia
2	DF	Adrien Pianelli	28 February 1995 (age 31)	3	0	(Luxembourg Football Federation) F91 Dudelange
3	DF	Thomas Berenguier	13 June 2002 (age 24)	3	0	(French Football Federation) Épinal
5	DF	Julien Célestine	24 July 1997 (age 29)	0	0	(Polish Football Association) Arka Gdynia
15	DF	Yohan Bocognano	16 June 1990 (age 36)	12	1	Retired
19	DF	Thibault Valéry	1 June 1992 (age 34)	2	0	(Corsica Football Association) Furiani-Agliani
21	DF	Lucas Pellegrini	17 April 2000 (age 26)	2	0	(Romanian Football Federation) Farul Constanța
23	DF	Tony Strata	7 September 2004 (age 22)	2	0	(Corsica Football Association) Ajaccio
4	MF	Anthony Roncaglia	30 August 2000 (age 26)	2	0	(Corsica Football Association) Bastia
6	MF	Jean-François Grimaldi	14 August 1988 (age 38)	9	0	Retired
10	MF	Rémy Cabella	8 March 1990 (age 36)	6	1	(Hellenic Football Federation) Volos
20	MF	Christophe Vincent	8 November 1992 (age 33)	5	0	(Corsica Football Association) Bastia
22	MF	Paul-Antoine Finidori	14 May 1998 (age 28)	2	0	(Corsica Football Association) Gazélec Ajaccio
25	MF	Julien Prenant-Caporossi	23 February 2006 (age 20)	2	0	(Corsica Football Association) Ajaccio
—	MF	Vincent Marchetti	4 July 1997 (age 29)	2	0	(French Football Federation) Paris FC
7	FW	Félix Tomi	31 August 2000 (age 26)	3	1	(Corsica Football Association) Bastia
9	FW	Benjamin Santelli	16 November 1991 (age 34)	9	5	(Corsica Football Association) Ajaccio
11	FW	Enzo Célestine	24 July 1997 (age 29)	1	0	(Football Association of Indonesia) Persibo Bojonegoro
12	FW	Laurent Pomponi	18 June 1996 (age 30)	2	0	(Corsica Football Association) Gazélec Ajaccio
14	FW	Ryan Contena	3 June 2004 (age 22)	0	0	(Corsica Football Association) Ajaccio
17	FW	Anthony Fosse	23 January 2005 (age 21)	2	0	Free agent
18	FW	Christopher Ibayi	18 July 1995 (age 31)	1	0	(Swiss Football Association) Thun

=== Recent call-ups ===
The following active players have been called up to the selection in the past and are still eligible to represent:

Pos.	Player	Date of birth (age)	Caps	Goals	Club	Latest call-up
GK	Cyril Fogacci	1 October 1996 (age 29)	0	0	(Corsica) Gazélec Ajaccio	2018 Tournoi des 4
GK	Thomas Vincensini	12 September 1993 (age 33)	1	0	Free agent	2018 Tournoi des 4
DF	Thibault Campanini	27 July 1998 (age 28)	2	0	(Corsica) Ajaccio	v. Sicily, 10 June 2023
DF	Dominique Guidi	6 February 1996 (age 30)	2	0	(Corsica) Bastia	v. Sicily, 10 June 2023 ^{INJ}
DF	Jérémi Santini	18 May 1998 (age 28)	0	0	(France) Versailles	v. Sicily, 10 June 2023
DF	Adrien Cinquini	17 May 1995 (age 31)	0	0	Free agent	v. Sicily, 10 June 2023
MF	Julien Benhaim	25 October 1996 (age 29)	3	0	(France) Stade Briochin	v. Sicily, 10 June 2023
MF	Mattéo Tramoni	20 January 2000 (age 26)	2	0	(Italy) Pisa	v. Sicily, 10 June 2023 ^{INJ}
MF	Julien Anziani	23 June 1999 (age 27)	1	0	(Turkey) Sarıyer	v. Sicily, 10 June 2023 ^{INJ}
MF	Julien Maggiotti	29 September 1995 (age 30)	1	0	(France) Laval	v. Sicily, 10 June 2023
MF	Yanis Cimignani	22 January 2002 (age 24)	0	0	(Switzerland) Lugano	v. Sicily, 10 June 2023
MF	Joseph Vittori	8 October 2002 (age 23)	0	0	Free agent	v. Sicily, 10 June 2023
MF	Baptiste Anziani	3 May 1990 (age 36)	3	0	(Corsica) ASE Ocana	v. Sardinia, 2 June 2019
MF	Christophe Casabianca	5 August 1992 (age 34)	1	0	Free agent	2018 Tournoi des 4
FW	Alexandre Cropanese	18 October 1993 (age 32)	3	0	(Corsica) Balagne	v. Sicily, 10 June 2023
FW	Carlu-Antò Savelli	1 January 2006 (age 20)	0	0	(Corsica) Borgo	v. Sicily, 10 June 2023
FW	Lisandru Tramoni	18 March 2003 (age 23)	0	0	(Switzerland) Zürich	v. Sicily, 10 June 2023 ^{INJ}
FW	Jean-Jacques Rocchi	1 June 1989 (age 37)	5	0	(Corsica) Borgo	v. Sardinia, 2 June 2019
FW	Francescu Massoni	7 January 1996 (age 30)	4	0	(Corsica) Bocognano	v. Sardinia, 2 June 2019
FW	Maxime Penneteau	28 October 1999 (age 26)	1	0	Free agent	v. Sardinia, 2 June 2019
FW	Julien Romain	23 February 1996 (age 30)	1	0	(Corsica) Porto-Vecchio	v. Nigeria, 26 May 2017

== Results ==
28 February 1967 Friendly	France	0–2	Corsica	Stade Vélodrome, Marseille
		Report	Sansonetti 2'; Serra 58'	Attendance: 12,000

14 May 1998 Friendly	Corsica	0–1	Cameroon	Stade Armand Cesari, Bastia

July 1998 Friendly	Sardinia	1–0	Corsica	Stadio Quadrivio, Nuoro
	Zola 65'	Report

6 June 2009 Friendly	Corsica	1–1	Congo	Stade Ange Casanova, Ajaccio
	Gaffory 11'	Report	Bakouboula 42'	Attendance: 2,500; Referee: Gerard Dany (France)

19 May 2010 Corsica Football Cup	Corsica	2–0	Brittany	Stade François Coty, Ajaccio
	Tibéri 45'; Mandrichi 60'	Report		Attendance: 4,000; Referee: Gerard Dany (France)

21 May 2010 Corsica Football Cup	Corsica	1–1	Gabon	Stade Armand Cesari, Bastia
	Berenguer 51'	Report	Do Marcolino 82'	Attendance: 4,000; Referee: Gerard Dany (France)

31 May 2011 Friendly	Corsica	1–0	Bulgaria	Stade François Coty, Ajaccio
	Cavalli 62'	Report		Attendance: 5,000; Referee: Stéphane Bré (France)

29 May 2015 Friendly	Corsica	1–0	Burkina Faso	Stade Armand Cesari, Bastia
	Bocognano 34'	Report		Attendance: 3,000; Referee: Benoît Millot (France)

27 May 2016 Friendly	Corsica	1–1 (8–9 p)	Basque Country	Ajaccio
	Santelli 20'	Report	Bergara 48'	Stadium: Stade Ange Casanova
	Penalties
	Modesto (penalty missed); Cavalli (penalty scored); Romain (penalty scored); Hugo Aine (penalty scored); Cabella (penalty scored); Coulbaly (penalty scored); Santelli (penalty scored); Pierazzi (penalty scored); Cioni (penalty scored); Cahuzac (penalty missed)		(penalty missed) M.González; (penalty scored) Eraso; (penalty scored) Susaeta; (penalty scored) Zurutuza; (penalty scored) Dani García; (penalty scored) Berchiche; (penalty scored) Sabin M. (penalty scored) Zaldua; (penalty scored) Ansotegi; (penalty scored) Bergara

26 May 2017 Friendly	Corsica	1–1	Nigeria	Ajaccio
	Mandrich 2'	Report	Iheanacho 83' (pen.)	Stadium: Stade François Coty; Attendance: 2,000

5 June 2018 2018 Tournoi des 4	Guadeloupe	0–3	Corsica	Fort-de-France (Martinique)
18:30		Report	Mandrichi 1', 55', 79'	Stadium: Stade Pierre-Aliker; Referee: (Martinique) Hugues Nirennold

7 June 2018 2018 Tournoi des 4	Martinique	5–1	Corsica	Fort-de-France (Martinique)
20:30	Stéphane Abaul 9'; Wesley Jobello 40'; Yann Thimon 45+1' (pen.); Bruno Grougi 66'; Grégory Pastel 88'	Report	Jean-Jacques Mandrichi 74'	Stadium: Stade Pierre-Aliker; Referee: François Merille (French Guiana)

2 June 2019 Friendly	Sardinia	1–1 (1–4 p)	Corsica	Olbia
	Cabeccia 8'		Cabella 10'	Stadium: Stadio Bruno Nespoli

10 June 2023 Sikelia Cup	Sicily	1-0	Corsica	Caltanissetta
18:00	Davis Curiale 69'	Report		Stadium: Stadio Marco Tomaselli; Referee: Antonio Gabriel Haba

22 May 2024 2024 Corsica Cup SF	Corsica	3–0	Sardinia	Corte
	Santelli 8', 32', 60'			Stadium: Stade Santos-Manfredi

25 May 2024 2024 Corsica Cup Final	Corsica	2–1	Saint Martin	Ajaccio
	Tomi 10'; Santelli 38'		45' (o.g.) Berenguier	Stadium: Stade Ange Casanova

== Corsican footballers who represented FIFA national teams ==
- (Algeria) Boumedienne Abderrhamane
- (Morocco) Chahir Belghazouani
- (Tunisia) Chaouki Ben Saada
- (Canada) Charles-Andreas Brym
- (France) Rémy Cabella
- (France) Dominique Colonna
- (France) Edmond Delfour
- (France) Mathieu Flamini
- (France) Ludovic Giuly
- (France) Franck Jurietti
- (Tunisia) Wahbi Khazri
- (France) Charles Orlanducci
- (France) Claude Papi
- (France) Robert Péri
- (France) Adil Rami
- (France) Paul Sinibaldi
- (France) Pierre Sinibaldi
- (France) Sébastien Squillaci
- (France) Albert Vanucci
- (French Polynesia) Teva Zaveroni

== Honours ==
=== Friendly ===
- Corsica Football Cup
  - Champions (2): 2010, 2024

== See also ==
Category:Footballers from Corsica
