= 2018 Tournoi des 4 =

Un tournoi amical en Martinique

Tournament details
- Country: Martinique
- Venue: 1
- Dates: 5–7 June 2018
- Teams: 4

Final positions
- Champions: Martinique
- Runners-up: Corsica
- Third place: French Guiana
- Fourth place: Guadeloupe

Tournament statistics
- Matches played: 4
- Goals scored: 14 (3.5 per match)

The Tournoi des 4 (Four Nations Tournament) was a football tournament that took place in Fort-de-France, Martinique during June 2018.

The competition was announced in January 2018 and featured the Corsica national football team's first matches outside of Europe.

== Participants ==
- Guadeloupe
- French Guiana
- Corsica
- Martinique

== Matches ==
=== Semi-finals ===
5 June 2018
18:30

Guadeloupe	0–3	Corsica
	Report	Mandrichi 1', 55', 79'

Stade Pierre-Aliker
Referee: Hugues Nirennold (Martinique)

5 June 2018
20:30

Martinique	3–0	French Guiana
Mickaël Biron 29', 40'; Daniel Hérelle 32'	Report

Stade Pierre-Aliker
Referee: Jacky Peroumal (Guadeloupe)

=== Third place play-off ===
7 June 2018
18:30

Guadeloupe	0–2	French Guiana
	Report	Rhudy Evens 16'; Joffrey Torvic 54'

Stade Pierre-Aliker
Referee: Joffrey Torvic (Martinique)

=== Final ===
7 June 2018
20:30

Martinique	5–1	Corsica
Stéphane Abaul 9'; Wesley Jobello 40'; Yann Thimon 45+1' (pen.); Bruno Grougi 66'; Grégory Pastel 88'	Report	Mandrichi 74'

Stade Pierre-Aliker
Referee: François Merille (French Guiana)
