= Pascal Berenguer =

French footballer (born 1981)

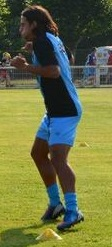
- Berenguer with Tours in 2013

Personal information
- Date of birth: 20 May 1981 (age 45)
- Place of birth: Marseille, France
- Height: 1.75 m (5 ft 9 in)
- Position: Midfielder

Youth career
- Bastia

Senior career*
Years	Team	Apps	(Gls)
1999–2003	Bastia	1	(0)
2001–2002	→ Istres (loan)	27	(2)
2002–2003	→ Istres (loan)	34	(3)
2003–2012	Nancy	229	(16)
2011–2012	→ Lens (loan)	23	(1)
2012–2013	→ Tours	27	(3)
2013–2015	Tours	52	(0)
Total		393	(25)

International career
2010–2011	Corsica	3	(1)
- * Club domestic league appearances and goals

Pascal Berenguer (born 20 May 1981, in Marseille, France) is a French former professional footballer who played as a midfielder.

After his retirement, he was appointed as head coach for the Tours FC under-19 team in November 2015.

== Honours ==
Nancy

- Coupe de la Ligue: 2005–06

Corsica

- 2010 Corsica Football Cup
