= Vincent Briant =

French footballer (born 1986)

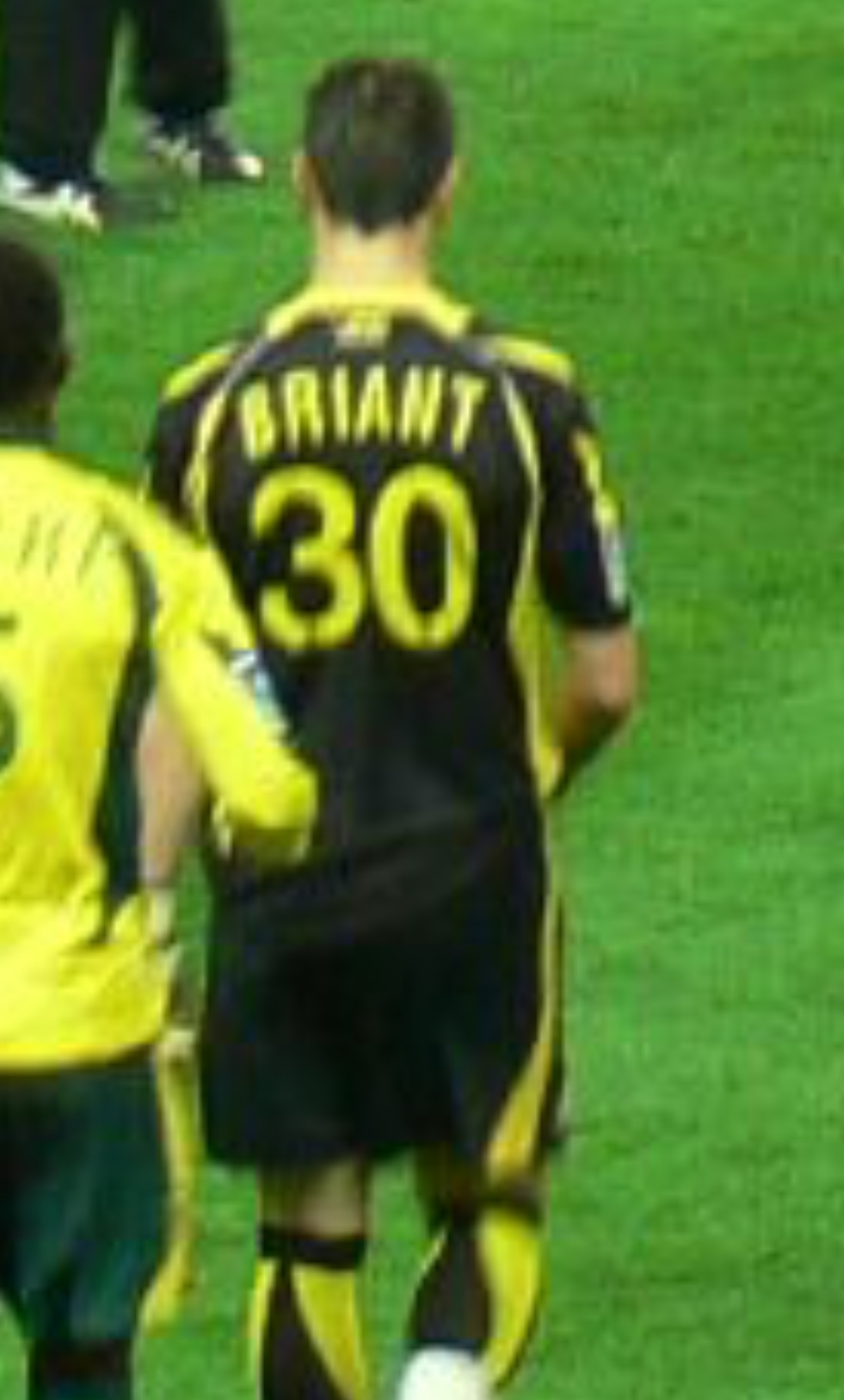
- Briant with Nantes in 2006

Personal information
- Date of birth: 9 January 1986 (age 40)
- Place of birth: Quimperlé, France
- Height: 1.84 m (6 ft 0 in)
- Position: Goalkeeper

Senior career*
| Years | Team | Apps | (Gls) |
| 2005–2006 | Nantes B | 12 | (0) |
| 2006–2008 | Nantes | 9 | (0) |
| 2008–2011 | Sedan | 15 | (0) |
| Total | | 36 | (0) |

International career
| 2010–2011 | Brittany | 3 | (0) |
- * Club domestic league appearances and goals

Vincent Briant (born 9 January 1986) is a French former professional footballer who played as a goalkeeper.

== Club career ==
Briant is a product of the Nantes training center. In a show on Gol TV called Soccer Academy he was one of two players to sign a professional contract with Nantes after the show followed the everyday lives of the players in the academy. The four favourites to gain the contract were Briant, Dimitri Payet, Fréjus Tchetgna (a defender from Cameroon) and Francisco Donzelot (a midfielder from Columbia). With the departure of Mickaël Landreau from Nantes it was decided that the club would sign Briant as their third string at only 19.

He retired at the age of 25 after the expiration of his contract with Sedan and became a manager of a store.
