= 2013 Sardinia floods =

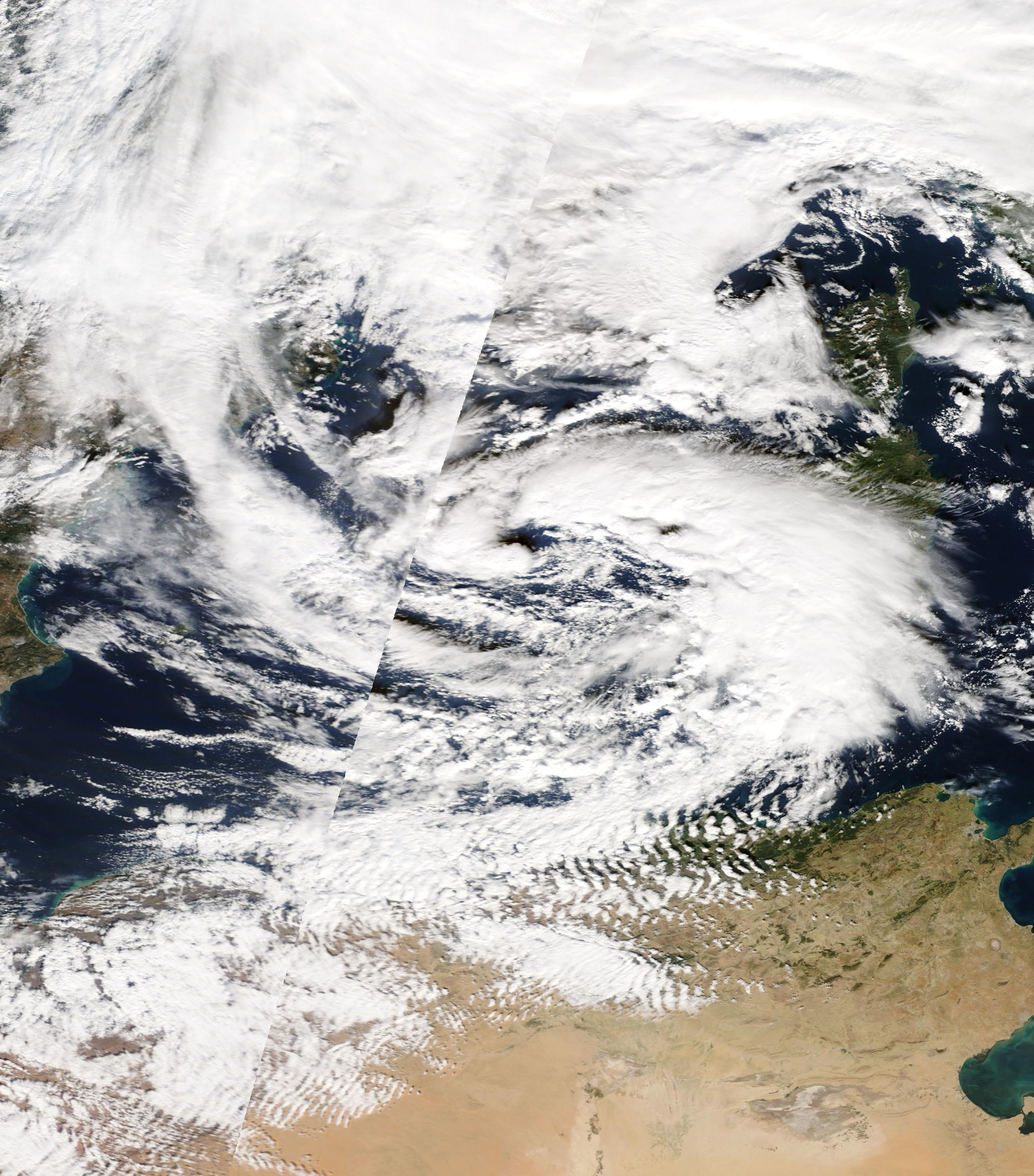
- Cyclone Cleopatra over the Mediterranean 19 November 2013
- Date: 17–19 November 2013
- Location: Olbia, Nuoro, Oristano, Gallura
- Deaths: 18 deaths and 3,000 homeless
- Property damage: €1 billion ($4.968.9 billion USD)

The 2013 Sardinia floods took place in and around the Sardinian town of Olbia, Italy between 17 and 19 November 2013. They also affected other parts of northeastern Sardinia and killed at least 18 people. Thousands of people were left homeless. The places which suffered the most damage were Olbia, and in general the whole region of Gallura. The flood caused damage of over 1 billion euros.

== Impact ==
The flooding was associated with an extratropical cyclone in the western Mediterranean Basin in November 2013, named Cyclone Cleopatra (also Ruven by the Free University of Berlin) which developed slow-moving embedded thunderstorm complexes, as cold air flowing from the north entered the Mediterranean and interacted with warm moist air to the east.

Continuous rain over two days resulted in the overflowing of the rivers in the northeastern part of Sardinia, flooding villages like Torpè and towns such as Olbia, Nuoro and Oristano. The cyclone brought extremely heavy rain to the island of Sardinia as more than 440 mm (17 in) of rain fell in 90 minutes on the morning of 19 November, resulting in flooding and swollen rivers bursting their banks. The area around the north-eastern city of Olbia has been affected the worst, where up to 3 m (120 in) of water has left cars and homes submerged.

Further afield, ferry services between Naples and the islands of Capri, Ischia and Procida were affected by gale-force winds and heavy seas, with bad weather spreading to Calabria and Campania on the Southern Italian mainland. As far north as Rome, authorities were monitoring the Tiber river.

== Aftermath ==
At least 18 people died as a result of the flooding in Sardinia. Enrico Letta, the Italian prime minister, declared a state of emergency on the island, describing it as a "national tragedy", promising 20 million euro for the reconstruction. As of 2014, the aforementioned funds have never been assigned.

On 19 November the Parliament of the European Union observed a minute's silence in memory of the victims, anticipated from condolence by the president of European Commission José Manuel Durão Barroso.

The date for the national day of mourning was established for 22 November, with the flag of Italy at half-mast.
