= Vincent Le Baron =

French footballer (born 1989)

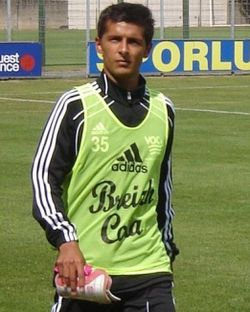
- Le Baron with Vannes in 2010

Personal information
- Date of birth: 10 June 1989 (age 37)
- Place of birth: Vannes, France
- Height: 1.82 m (6 ft 0 in)
- Position: Midfielder

Youth career
- Vannes

Senior career*
Years	Team	Apps	(Gls)
2006–2008	Vannes B	13	(0)
2008–2009	St. Colomban Locminé		
2009–2011	Vannes	13	(0)
2011–2013	Laval	49	(5)
2014	St. Colomban Locminé	12	(1)
2014	Vannes	2	(1)
2014–2015	Vitré	21	(2)
2015–2016	Le Mans	18	(3)
2016–2018	St. Colomban Locminé		
2018–2020	Avenir de Theix		
2020–2021	ES Plescop		

International career
2011	Brittany	1	(0)
- * Club domestic league appearances and goals

Vincent Le Baron (born 10 June 1989) is a French former professional footballer who played as a midfielder. He started his senior career hometown club Vannes OC and with Saint-Colomban Locminé. Le Baron made 13 appearances for Vannes during the 2010–11 season and was signed by Stade Lavallois in the summer of 2011.
