= Robert Péri =

French footballer (1941–2022)

Personal information
- Date of birth: 29 January 1941
- Place of birth: Marseille, France
- Date of death: 15 January 2022 (aged 80)
- Height: 1.84 m (6 ft 0 in)
- Position: Defender

Senior career*
| Years | Team | Apps | (Gls) |
- Aix
| –1965 | Stade Français | | |
| 1965–1969 | Bordeaux | | |
| 1969–1970 | Metz | 26 | (0) |
| 1970 | Angoulême | | |
| 1970–1972 | Bordeaux | | |
| 1972–1975 | Toulon | | |

International career
| 1965–1967 | France | 3 | (0) |
| 1967 | Corsica | 1 | (0) |
- * Club domestic league appearances and goals

Robert Péri (29 January 1941 – 15 January 2022) was a French professional footballer who played as a defender.
