= Francesco Virdis =

Italian footballer

Personal information
- Full name: Francesco Virdis
- Date of birth: 16 January 1985 (age 41)
- Place of birth: Ozieri, Italy
- Height: 1.83 m (6 ft 0 in)
- Position: Forward

Team information
- Current team: Asti

Youth career
- Sampdoria

Senior career*
Years	Team	Apps	(Gls)
2004–2011	Sampdoria	0	(0)
2004–2005	→ Montevarchi (loan)	28	(9)
2005–2006	→ Chieti (loan)	33	(12)
2006–2007	→ Cesena (loan)	13	(2)
2007	→ Modena (loan)	5	(0)
2007–2008	→ Ravenna (loan)	6	(0)
2008	→ Pescara (loan)	4	(0)
2008–2009	→ Legnano (loan)	25	(4)
2009–2010	→ Foligno (loan)	23	(3)
2010–2011	→ South Tyrol (loan)	11	(1)
2011	→ Pomezia (loan)	12	(3)
2011–2012	Progetto Sant'Elia	27	(22)
2012–2014	Savona	63	(39)
2014	Monza	11	(2)
2015	L'Aquila	13	(3)
2015–2016	Savona	27	(7)
2016–2017	Venezia	0	(0)
2016–2017	→ AlbinoLeffe (loan)	21	(3)
2017	Latte Dolce	11	(1)
2017–2018	Finale	17	(4)
2018–2019	Savona	33	(17)
2019	Delta Rovigo	2	(1)
2019–2020	Latte Dolce	23	(12)
2020–2021	Muravera	14	(5)
2021–	Asti	0	(0)
- * Club domestic league appearances and goals as of 21 December 2017

Francesco Virdis (born 16 January 1985) is an Italian footballer who plays as a forward for Asti Calcio.

== Career ==
=== Sampdoria and early career ===
Virdis started his career at Sampdoria before being loaned to a whole host of Italian lower league clubs, the most recent of which, Savona, he joined on 10 July 2018.

Virdis became a free agent and joined a Serie D club. He re-birthed with 22 goals.

=== Journeyman in Lega Pro ===
On 19 July 2012 Serie A club Chievo signed Virdis as a free agent and re-sold half of the registration rights to Savona for a peppercorn of €500. In June 2013 Savona acquired Virdis outright from Chievo for another €80,000.

On 18 June 2014 he was signed by Monza. Circa January 2015 he was signed by L'Aquila. In summer 2015 he was released.

On 4 August 2015 he was re-signed by Savona in a 1-year contract.

On 9 June 2016 Virdis was signed by Lega Pro newcomer Venice. However, on 23 August he was loaned to AlbinoLeffe. AlbinoLeffe was re-admitted to Lega Pro to fill the vacancy.
