= Guillaume Moullec =

French footballer (born 1980)

Personal information
- Full name: Guillaume Moullec
- Date of birth: March 7, 1980 (age 46)
- Place of birth: Brest, France
- Height: 1.73 m (5 ft 8 in)
- Positions: Right midfielder; right back

Youth career
- 1997–2001: Montpellier

Senior career*
Years	Team	Apps	(Gls)
2001–2005	Montpellier	102	(5)
2005–2007	Lorient	59	(3)
2007–2010	Nantes	66	(1)
2010–2012	Clermont Foot	55	(2)
2012–2013	Carquefou	13	(0)
Total		295	(11)

International career
2008–2011	Brittany	4	(0)

Managerial career
- 2024–2026: Mauritius
- * Club domestic league appearances and goals

Guillaume Moullec (born March 7, 1980) is a French former professional footballer who played as a right midfielder or right back. He was the head coach of the Mauritius national football team.
