= Bernard Bouger =

French association football player (born 1970)

Personal information
- Date of birth: 9 January 1970 (age 56)
- Place of birth: Hennebont, France
- Position: Striker

Senior career*
Years	Team	Apps	(Gls)
1994–1997	Lorient		
1997–2000	Sochaux		
2000–2003	Créteil		

International career
- Brittany
- * Club domestic league appearances and goals

Bernard Bouger (born 9 January 1970) is a French football manager and former footballer who last managed UR La Louvière Centre.

== Early life ==
Bouger was influenced by his father to start playing football at a young age. His twin brother, Yves, also became a footballer.

== Club career ==
Bouger started his career with French side Lorient. He retired from professional football after suffering an injury.

== International career ==
Bouger played for the Brittany football team.

== Style of play ==
Bouger as described as not having the "profile of today's big athletic strikers, but that didn't stop him from scoring a lot of goals".

== Managerial career ==
After retiring from professional football, Bouger worked as a manager.
