= Mickaël Caradec =

French footballer (born 1982)

Mikaël Caradec
Personal information
- Date of birth: 29 April 1982 (age 44)
- Place of birth: Saint-Nazaire, France
- Height: 1.89 m (6 ft 2 in)
- Position: Goalkeeper

Senior career*
Years	Team	Apps	(Gls)
2002–2004	Fontenay-le-Comte	1	(0)
2004–2005	Lannion	?	(?)
2005–2006	La Flèche	?	(?)
2006–2009	Vendée Poiré sur Vie	?	(?)
2009–2011	Bayonne	18	(0)
2011–2013	Châteauroux	24	(0)
2013–2014	Saint-Nazaire	?	(?)
2014–2015	La Chapelle-sur-Erdre	?	(?)
2015–2016	Orvault	?	(?)
2017–	Cholet	?	(?)

International career
2011	Brittany	2	(0)
- * Club domestic league appearances and goals as of 03:52, 27 May 2016 (UTC)

Mikaël Caradec (born 29 April 1982) is a French professional footballer who currently plays as a goalkeeper for Cholet.
