= Olivier Guéguen =

French footballer (born 1990)

Personal information
- Date of birth: 27 June 1990 (age 36)
- Place of birth: France
- Height: 1.89 m (6 ft 2 in)
- Position: Defender

Team information
- Current team: US Fougères

College career
Years	Team	Apps	(Gls)
2013	Lander Bearcats		
2014	Coastal Carolina Chanticleers		

Senior career*
Years	Team	Apps	(Gls)
2008	Stade Brestois 29 B		
2009	Amiens SC B		
2009–2013	Stade Plabennécois	64	(1)
2015	Torquay United	7	(1)
2015–2017	Voltigeurs de Châteaubriant	48	(2)
2017–2021	AS Vitré	73	(5)
2022–	US Fougères	28	(1)

International career
- Brittany
- * Club domestic league appearances and goals

Olivier Guéguen (born 27 June 1990) is a French footballer who plays as a defender for US Fougères.

== Early life ==
Guéguen is a native of Brittany, France.

== Education ==
Guéguen attended business school.

== Career ==
In 2009, Guéguen signed for French side Stade Plabennécois, where he was regarded as a prospect. In 2015, he signed for English side Torquay United after trialling for the club. He then left after a change in ownership. In 2017, he signed for French side AS Vitré. In 2022, he signed for French side US Fougères, where he was described as "settled in a three-man system".

== International career ==
Guéguen played for the Brittany national football team.

== Style of play ==
Guéguen mainly operates as a defender and is known for his technical ability.

== Personal life ==
Guéguen has a daughter.
