= Délis Ahou =

Nigerien footballer (born 1984)

Personal information
- Date of birth: 23 August 1984 (age 42)
- Place of birth: Nantes, France
- Height: 1.77 m (5 ft 9 1/2 in)
- Position: Defender

Team information
- Current team: Virton

Youth career
- 1999–2003: Nantes

Senior career*
| Years | Team | Apps | (Gls) |
| 2003–2004 | Nantes | 0 | (0) |
| 2004 | → Racing Levallois 92 (loan) | 0 | (0) |
| 2004–2005 | USJA Carquefou | ? | (?) |
| 2005–2006 | Gazélec Ajaccio | 13 | (0) |
| 2006–2009 | Angers SCO | 54 | (1) |
| 2010– | Virton | ? | (?) |

International career^{‡}
| 2010–2011 | Niger | 6 | (0) |
- * Club domestic league appearances and goals as of 15:19, 21 April 2011 (UTC) ‡ National team caps and goals as of 15:19, 21 April 2011 (UTC)

Délis Ahou (born 23 August 1984) is a footballer who plays as a defender for Belgian club Virton. Born in France, he represented Niger at international level.

== Early and personal life ==
Ahou was born in Nantes to a Nigerien father and a French mother.

== Career ==
Ahou began his career with hometown club Nantes in 1999, before later playing for Racing Levallois 92, USJA Carquefou, Gazélec Ajaccio and Angers SCO. Ahou signed for Belgian club Virton in 2010.

== International career ==
Ahou represented France at youth level, but made his senior international debut for Niger in 2010.
