= Hugo Aine =

French footballer (born 1995)

Personal information
- Date of birth: 11 December 1995 (age 30)
- Place of birth: Bastia, France
- Height: 1.78 m (5 ft 10 in)
- Position: Midfielder

Senior career*
Years	Team	Apps	(Gls)
2015–2016	Ajaccio	15	(0)
2016–2018	Chambly	23	(0)
Total		38	(0)

International career
2015—2018	Corsica	1	(0)
- * Club domestic league appearances and goals

Hugo Aine (born 11 December 1995) is a former French professional footballer who last played as a midfielder for FC Chambly.

== Club career ==
Aine made his professional debut in March 2015, in a 1–2 Ligue 2 defeat against Clermont Foot.

On 23 June 2016, Aine joined FC Chambly of the Championnat National.

In September 2017, during a match against Red Star, Aine suffered a heart attack. He was diagnosed with arrhythmia and forced to end his professional career.
