= Samuel Néva =

French footballer (born 1981)

Personal information
- Full name: Samuel Néva
- Date of birth: 15 May 1981 (age 45)
- Place of birth: Le Mans, France
- Height: 1.83 m (6 ft 0 in)
- Position: Defender

Youth career
- 1996–1999: Stade Lavallois

Senior career*
Years	Team	Apps	(Gls)
1999–2004	Stade Lavallois	102	(1)
2004–2005	Le Havre AC	24	(0)
2005–2007	Grenoble Foot	20	(0)
2007	FCM Brussels	17	(0)
2007–2009	Dender	41	(0)
2009–2012	Apollon Limassol	57	(1)
- * Club domestic league appearances and goals as of 18 May 2011

Samuel Néva (born 15 May 1981) is a French football player. He played for Apollon Limassol in the Marfin Laiki League in Cyprus.
