= Aurélien Nattes =

French footballer (born 1984)

Personal information
- Date of birth: 30 March 1984 (age 42)
- Place of birth: Laval, France
- Height: 1.80 m (5 ft 11 in)
- Position: Defender

Senior career*
Years	Team	Apps	(Gls)
2003–2006	Laval	63	(1)
2007–2010	La Vitréenne		
2010–2011	Vendée Poiré sur Vie		
2011–2012	La Vitréenne		
- * Club domestic league appearances and goals

Aurélien Nattes (born 30 March 1984) is a French former professional footballer who played as a defender. He played professional football in Ligue 2 for Laval and for La Vitréenne FC in the Championnat de France amateur. He also played for Vendée Poiré sur Vie.
