= Sylvie Josset =

French footballer (born 1963)

Personal information
- Date of birth: 14 August 1963 (age 63)
- Place of birth: Saint-Brieuc, France
- Position: Goalkeeper

Senior career*
Years	Team	Apps	(Gls)
1983-1992	Saint-Brieuc SC		

International career
1984-1991	France	26	(0)
- * Club domestic league appearances and goals

Sylvie Josset (born 14 August 1963) is a French former footballer who played as a goalkeeper for Saint-Brieuc SC and the France national team.

Josset represented France 26 times.
