= Mickaël Buzaré =

French footballer (born 1976)

Personal information
- Full name: Mickaël Buzaré
- Date of birth: June 30, 1976 (age 50)
- Place of birth: Lesneven, France
- Height: 1.80 m (5 ft 11 in)
- Position: Defender

Senior career*
Years	Team	Apps	(Gls)
1995–1996	Brest	32	(4)
1996–1997	Rennes	0	(0)
1997–1998	Rennes B	27	(2)
1998–2010	Laval	314	(3)
Total		351	(5)

International career
2008–2010	Brittany	3	
- * Club domestic league appearances and goals

Mickaël Buzaré (born June 30, 1976) is a French former professional football defender. He played most of his career with Ligue 2 side Laval.
