= Davide Arras =

Italian footballer (born 1998)

Personal information
- Date of birth: 2 April 1998 (age 28)
- Place of birth: Olbia, Italy
- Height: 1.76 m (5 ft 9 in)
- Position: Forward

Team information
- Current team: Giulianova

Youth career
- –2013: Vicenza
- 2013–2015: Juventus
- 2015–2017: Cagliari

Senior career*
Years	Team	Apps	(Gls)
2017–2018	Olbia	12	(0)
2018	→ Reggina (loan)	0	(0)
2018–2019	Cuneo	10	(0)
2019–2020	Foligno	24	(6)
2020–2021	Pianese	34	(16)
2021–2022	Grosseto	37	(7)
2022–2023	Siena	17	(1)
2023	→ Gubbio (loan)	13	(0)
2023–2024	Pro Sesto	14	(1)
2024–2025	Pro Palazzolo	46	(12)
2025–2026	Vado	31	(12)
2026–	Giulianova	0	(0)

International career^{‡}
2013	Italy U15	2	(0)
- * Club domestic league appearances and goals as of 25 June 2026 ‡ National team caps and goals as of 13 June 2013

Davide Arras, nicknamed "Il Mago" (born 2 April 1998) is an Italian professional footballer who plays as a forward for Serie D club Giulianova.

== Club career ==
Born in Olbia, Arras started his career in Vicenza, then Juventus and Cagliari youth sectors.

In 2017 he joined to Olbia. Arras made his professional debut for Serie C on 3 September 2017 against Follonica Gavorrano.

In 2018, he was loaned to Reggina, but didn’t play for the club.

In August 2018, he left Olbia and signed with Cuneo

For the next season, in August 2019 he joined to Foligno.

After one year in Foligno, he signed for Serie D club Pianese.

On 14 July 2021, he signed with Grosseto.

On 3 August 2022, Arras moved to Siena on a multi-year contract. On 31 January 2023, Arras was loaned to Gubbio, with an option to buy.

== International career ==
Arras played two matches for Italy U15 in 2013.
