= Ousseni Labo =

Togolese footballer

Personal information
- Date of birth: June 11, 1982 (age 44)
- Place of birth: Lomé, Togo
- Height: 1.73 m (5 ft 8 in)
- Position: Midfielder

Team information
- Current team: VfL Wolbeck

Youth career
- 1999–2002: Modèle Lomé
- 2003–2004: ESV Münster

Senior career*
| Years | Team | Apps | (Gls) |
| 2004–2005 | GW Gelmer | | |
| 2005–2006 | SV Davaria Davensberg | 25 | (0) |
| 2006–2007 | SC Verl | 3 | (0) |
| 2007–2008 | FC Eintracht Rheine | 22 | (0) |
| 2009 | Rot-Weiss Ahlen II | 2 | (0) |
| 2009–2010 | SV Davaria Davensberg | | |
| 2010–2012 | VfL Wolbeck | | |
| 2012–2014 | Beckumer SV | | |
| 2014–2017 | SG Sendenhorst | | |
| 2017–2018 | Beckumer SV | | |

International career
| 2008– | Togo | 6 | (0) |

Managerial career
- 2006–2007: ESV Münster u-15
- 2007–present: ESV Münster U-18 (co-trainer)
- * Club domestic league appearances and goals

Ousseni Labo (born June 11, 1982 in Lomé) is a former Togolese footballer, who last played for Beckumer SV.

== Career ==
Labo played formerly for FC Eintracht Rheine in the Oberliga Westfalen, he left the team on 15 May 2008. Labo formerly played for SC Verl, SV Davaria Davensberg, GW Gelmer, ESV Münster and FC Modèle da Lomé. On 4 February 2009, he signed a contract with Rot-Weiss Ahlen to play in the reserve team, but after only a half year returned to SV Davaria Davensberg in July 2009.

=== Position ===
He currently plays as left midfielder. Formerly, he played left back in Lomé, and as striker in his last club.

== International career ==
Labo played his first game on 22 August 2007 against Zambia, appearing as substitute in minute 60.

== Coaching career ==
He worked two years as youth coach for ESV Münster, now as U19 Assistant Coach for ESV Münster.
