= Magrini =

Magrini is an Italian surname. Notable people with the surname include:

- Andrea Magrini (born 1997), Italian football player
- Fabio Magrini (born 1965), Italian weightlifter
- Pete Magrini (born 1942), American baseball player
- Riccardo Magrini (born 1954), Italian cyclist
- Tullia Magrini (1950–2005), Italian anthropologist

== See also ==
- Giuseppina Finzi-Magrini (1878–1944), Italian opera singer
