= Marcel Bouyer =

French politician

- Born: 1 July 1920; Royan, France
- Died: 9 August 2000 (aged 80); Vaux-sur-Mer, France
- Occupation: Politician

Marcel Bouyer (1 July 1920 – 9 August 2000) was a French politician. He served as a member of the National Assembly from 1956 to 1958, representing Charente-Maritime.

== Early life ==
Marcel Bouyer was born on 1 July 1920 in Royan, France.

== Career ==
Bouyer worked as a pastry chef in Royan. He volunteered to serve in the French Army during World War II.

Bouyer joined the Union for the Defense of Tradesmen and Artisans. He served as a member of the National Assembly from 1956 to 1958, representing Charente-Maritime. He was a proponent of French Algeria.

== Death ==
Bouyer died on 9 August 2000 in Vaux-sur-Mer, France.
