= Mathieu Bouyer =

French professional football player (born 1987)

Personal information
- Date of birth: January 17, 1987 (age 39)
- Place of birth: Nantes, France
- Height: 1.80 m (5 ft 11 in)
- Position: Midfielder

Team information
- Current team: Trélissac

Senior career*
Years	Team	Apps	(Gls)
2004–2007	Nantes (B team)		
2007–2009	Racing Ferrol	1	(0)
2007–2008	→ Lemona (loan)	13	(1)
2009	Thouars Foot 79		
2009–2010	Barakaldo	20	(1)
2010–2015	Trélissac		
2015	Cholet		

International career
2010	Brittany	2	(0)
- * Club domestic league appearances and goals as of 15:00, 2 November 2009 (UTC)

Mathieu Bouyer (born January 17, 1987) is a French professional football player. Currently, he plays in CFA for Cholet. Besides France, he has played in Spain.

He played on the professional level in Segunda División for Racing de Ferrol.
