= Cédric Le Hénaff =

French association football player (born 1984)

Personal information
- Date of birth: April 19, 1984 (age 42)
- Place of birth: Brest, France
- Height: 1.77 m (5 ft 9 1/2 in)
- Position: Striker

Senior career*
Years	Team	Apps	(Gls)
2005–2006	Stade Plabennec		
2006–2007	Stade Brestois	1	(0)
2007–2009	Vannes OC	28	(0)
2009–2010	AS Beauvais		
2010–2012	Stade Plabennecois		

International career
2010	Brittany	2	(1)
- * Club domestic league appearances and goals as of 07:25, 3 July 2015 (UTC)

Cédric Le Hénaff (born April 19, 1984) is a French former professional footballer who played in Ligue 2 for Stade Brestois 29 and Vannes OC.
