= Corinne Kerouredan =

French footballer (born 1969)

Personal information
- Date of birth: 11 March 1969 (age 57)
- Place of birth: Quimper, France
- Position: Forward

International career
Years	Team	Apps	(Gls)
1991–1994	France	2	(0)

Corinne Kerouredan (born 11 March 1969) is a French football player who played as a striker for Quimper Kerfeunteun F.C. and the France women's national team.

== International career ==
Corinne Kerouredan made two appearances for the French national team.
