= Christophe Cazarelly =

French footballer (born 1975)

Personal information
- Date of birth: 10 February 1975 (age 51)
- Place of birth: Marseille, France
- Height: 1.75 m (5 ft 9 in)
- Position: Midfielder

Senior career*
Years	Team	Apps	(Gls)
1991–1994	Nantes B		
1994–1995	RC Ancenis		
1995–2003	Laval	191	(3)
2003–2004	Amiens	43	(0)
2005–2006	Reims	17	(0)
2006–2007	ES Fréjus	18	(0)
2007–2010	SO Cassis Carnoux	82	(1)
2010–2011	GS Consolat	6	(0)
- * Club domestic league appearances and goals

Christophe Cazarelly (born 10 February 1975) is a French former professional football player.

He played on the professional level in Ligue 2 for Stade Lavallois, Amiens SC and Stade de Reims.
