= Tony Heurtebis =

French football goalkeeper (born 1975)

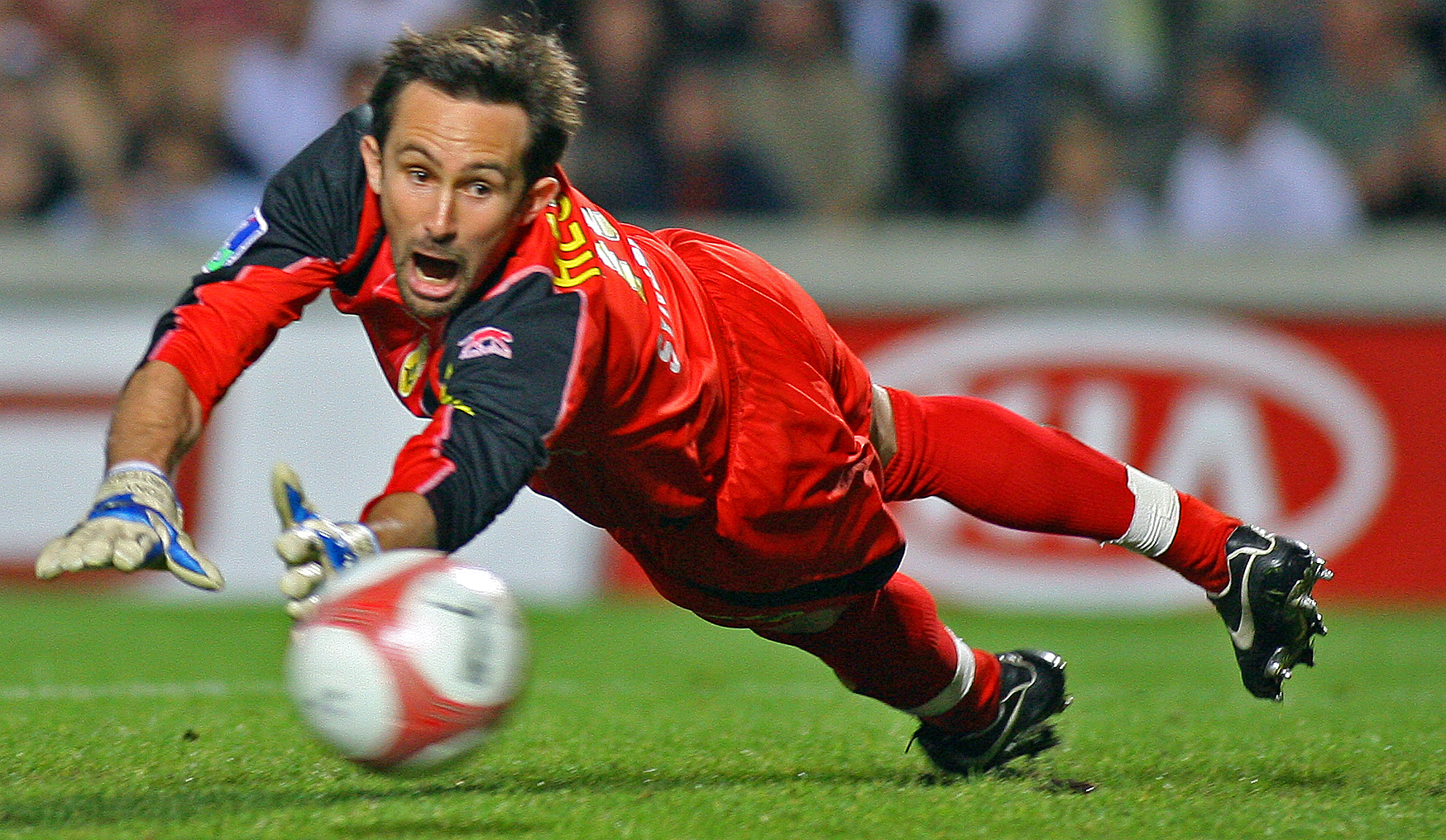

Personal information
- Full name: Tony Heurtebis
- Date of birth: 15 January 1975 (age 51)
- Place of birth: Saint-Nazaire, France
- Height: 1.81 m (5 ft 11 1/2 in)
- Position: Goalkeeper

Senior career*
| Years | Team | Apps | (Gls) |
| 1995–1999 | Rennes | 57 | (0) |
| 1999–2004 | Troyes | 150 | (0) |
| 2004–2005 | Brest | 26 | (0) |
| 2005–2010 | Nantes | 53 | (0) |

International career^{‡}
| 1992–1993 | France U19 | 1 | (0) |
- France U21
- * Club domestic league appearances and goals as of 1 July 2007 ‡ National team caps and goals as of 1 July 2007

Tony Heurtebis (born 15 January 1975) is a French footballer who played as a goalkeeper for Stade Rennais, Troyes AC, Stade Brestois and FC Nantes Atlantique. He has been capped for the France under-21 squad.

== Statistics ==
| Years | Club | Competition | Apps. | Goals |
|---|---|---|---|---|
| 1995–1996 | Stade Rennais | Ligue 1 | 8 | 0 |
| 1996–1997 | Stade Rennais | Ligue 1 | 10 | 0 |
| 1997–1998 | Stade Rennais | Ligue 1 | 34 | 0 |
| 1998–1999 | Stade Rennais | Ligue 1 | 5 | 0 |

== Honours ==
Troyes AC

- UEFA Intertoto Cup: 2001
