= Jean-Jacques Mandrichi =

French footballer (born 1984)

Personal information
- Full name: Jean-Jacques Christian Mandrichi
- Date of birth: 3 June 1984 (age 42)
- Place of birth: Bastia, France
- Height: 1.84 m (6 ft 1/2 in)
- Position: Forward

Team information
- Current team: FC Mougins (assistant)

Youth career
- 2003–2004: Bastia

Senior career*
Years	Team	Apps	(Gls)
2004–2005	Corte	22	(27)
2005–2009	AC Ajaccio	93	(24)
2009	→ Nîmes (loan)	18	(7)
2009–2010	Nîmes	39	(11)
2010–2011	Grenoble	31	(10)
2011	Nantes	3	(0)
2011–2012	Châteauroux	18	(3)
2012	Gazélec Ajaccio	9	(0)
2013	Red Star	15	(3)
2013–2014	CA Bastia	8	(0)
2014–2015	Borgo		
2015–2018	Cannes	26	(13)
2018–2019	Istres	25	(4)
2019–2020	Gallia Lucciana	3	(1)
2020–2022	AS Vence		

International career
2009–20??	Corsica	5	(4)

Managerial career
- 202?–: FC Mougins (assistant)
- * Club domestic league appearances and goals

Jean-Jacques Mandrichi (born 3 June 1984) is a retired French footballer who played as a forward and current assistant manager of FC Mougins.

== Career ==
Mandrichi was born in Bastia. After a successful time at AC Ajaccio Mandrichi signed a two-year deal to play for Grenoble Foot 38. After scoring 52 goals in Ligue 2, on 30 July 2011, Mandrichi moved to Ligue 2 rivals FC Nantes, signing a two-year contract. Soon after the signing, the player was openly criticised by club owner Waldemar Kita, and on 4 October 2011, FC Nantes and Jean-Jacques Mandrichi decided to terminate the contract signed in late July.

He signed a two-year contract with LB Châteauroux, but after one season, he moved to newly promoted Ligue 2 side Gazélec Ajaccio on a two-year deal.

In January 2013, Mandrichi moved to Championnat National side Red Star Saint-Ouen.
