= Albert Vanucci =

French footballer (1947–2025)

- Vanucci at AS Monaco (c. 1975)

Personal information
- Date of birth: 8 August 1947
- Place of birth: Ajaccio, France
- Date of death: 6 April 2025 (aged 77)
- Position: Defender

Youth career
- 1960–?: Ajaccio

Senior career*
Years	Team	Apps	(Gls)
19??–1971	Ajaccio		
1971–1974	Sochaux		
1974–1975	Marseille	24	(0)
1975–1978	Monaco	61	(0)
1978–1980	Gazélec Ajaccio		
1980–1982	Besançon RC		
1982–1983	Gazélec Ajaccio		

International career
1974	France	2	(0)

Managerial career
- 2004: Gazélec Ajaccio
- * Club domestic league appearances and goals

Albert Vanucci (8 August 1947 – 6 April 2025) was a French professional football player and coach who played as a defender. He died on 6 April 2025, at the age of 77.
