= Camaldine Abraw =

Togolese footballer (born 1990)

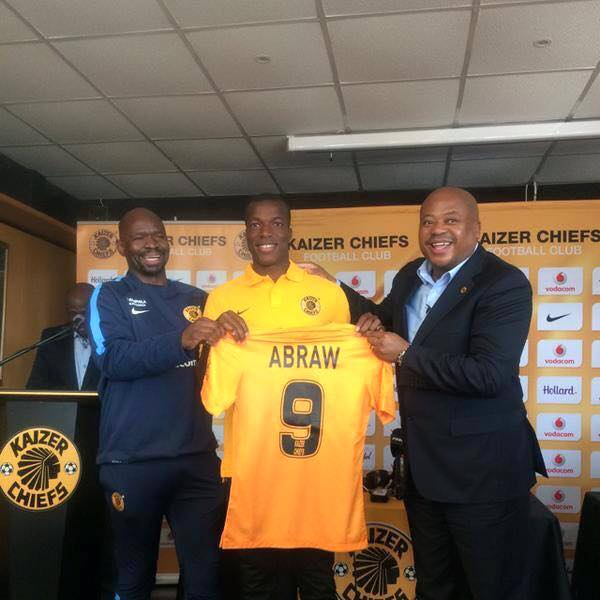
- Camal Abraw in South Africa, season 2015

Personal information
- Date of birth: 15 August 1990 (age 36)
- Place of birth: Lomé, Togo
- Height: 1.80 m (5 ft 11 in)
- Position: Forward

Team information
- Current team: Ouest Tourangeau

Youth career
- 2004–2008: Académie Delta Liberty
- 2008–2009: Châteauroux

Senior career*
Years	Team	Apps	(Gls)
2009–2010	Châteauroux B	23	(13)
2010–2013	Châteauroux	13	(0)
2011–2012	→ Les Herbiers (loan)	15	(3)
2012–2013	→ Cherbourg (loan)	27	(4)
2014–2015	Free State Stars	42	(7)
2015–2017	Kaizer Chiefs	20	(4)
2017	Poli Timișoara	7	(1)
2018	AmaZulu	5	(0)
2018	Al-Dhaid		
2019	Caudal	7	(3)
2019–	Ouest Tourangeau	1	(0)

International career
2007	Togo U-17	15	(4)
2010–	Togo	8	(0)
- * Club domestic league appearances and goals as of 23:01, 19 October 2019 (UTC)

Camaldine Abraw (born 15 August 1990) is a Togolese footballer who plays for French club Football Club de l'Ouest Tourangeau 37.

== Career ==
Born in Lomé, Abraw began his career in 2004 with Académie Delta Liberty. In 2008 he joined French club LB Châteauroux and played the 2008–09 season with the youth team. In the 2009–10 season he was promoted to the reserve team and made his professional debut for Châteauroux in the Ligue 2 on 2 April 2010 against Dijon. On 28 May 2010, he signed his first professional contract with Châteauroux over three years.

In August 2013, Abraw moved to Free State Stars in the South African Premier Soccer League, signing a two-year contract with the option of a further year.

On 6 February 2019, Abraw signed with Tercera División side Caudal Deportivo. After seven games for the club, Caudal announced on their official Twitter profile, that Abraw had left the club for personal reasons.

== International career ==
Abraw is former member of the Togo national under-17 football team, played the 2007 FIFA U-17 World Cup in South Korea and the African U-17 Cup. He made his senior debut for the Togo national football team on 13 May 2010 against Gabon national football team.

== Personal life ==
Camaldine is the son of former Togolese footballer and manager Samer Abraw.
