= Ghislaine Baron =

French footballer (1966-2019)

Personal information
- Date of birth: 2 June 1966
- Place of birth: Avranches, France
- Date of death: 28 February 2019 (aged 53)
- Height: 1.67 m (5 ft 6 in)
- Position: Defender

Senior career*
Years	Team	Apps	(Gls)
1988–1992	Saint-Brieuc SC		

International career
1989–1993	France	24	(0)
- * Club domestic league appearances and goals

Ghislaine Baron (2 June 1966 – 28 February 2019) was a French footballer who played as a defender for Saint-Brieuc SC and the France national team.

== International career ==
Baron represented France 24 times and scored 0 goals.

== Death ==
Baron died on February 28, 2019 at the age of 53 following a long illness.

== Honours ==
- Division 1 Féminine
  - Winners (1): 1988–89
