= Damien Tibéri =

French footballer (born 1985)

Personal information
- Date of birth: 23 August 1985 (age 41)
- Place of birth: Fréjus, France
- Height: 1.81 m (5 ft 11 in)
- Position: Left midfielder

Senior career*
Years	Team	Apps	(Gls)
2003–2006	Saint-Raphaël		
2006–2011	Sedan	108	(8)
2011–2013	Ajaccio	33	(0)
2013–2014	Laval	12	(1)
2014–2015	CA Bastia	26	(1)
2015–2016	Grenoble	27	(3)
2016–2018	Fréjus Saint-Raphaël	46	(1)

International career
2010–?	Corsica	4	(1)
- * Club domestic league appearances and goals

Damien Tibéri (born 23 August 1985) is a French former professional footballer who played as a left midfielder.

After playing for CS Sedan-Ardennes from 2006 to 2011, Tibéri joined AC Ajaccio in July 2011.
