= Guy Calleja =

French footballer (1938–2023)

Personal information
- Date of birth: 29 May 1938
- Place of birth: Bordeaux, France
- Date of death: 29 August 2023 (aged 85)
- Place of death: Corsica, France
- Height: 1.77 m (5 ft 10 in)
- Position: Central defender

Youth career
- Stade Talençais

Senior career*
Years	Team	Apps	(Gls)
1954–1956	Bordeaux B		
1956–1969	Bordeaux	379	(24)
1969–1975	Gazélec Ajaccio		

Managerial career
- 1971–1976: Gazélec Ajaccio
- 1981–1990: Gazélec Ajaccio
- 1998: Cannes
- * Club domestic league appearances and goals

Guy Calleja (29 May 1938 – 29 August 2023) was a French football player and coach.

== Career ==
Born in Bordeaux, Calleja played as a central defender for Stade Talençais, Bordeaux and Gazélec Ajaccio. He spent 14 seasons with Bordeaux, making 441 appearances and serving as captain. With the club he was runner-up in the league three times, and runner-up in the Cup three times.

He later became a coach, and managed Gazélec Ajaccio and Cannes. He also briefly ran Bordeaux's training centre.

He died on Corsica.
