= Sassari Calcio Latte Dolce =

Italian football club

Latte Dolce
- Nickname: Latte Dolce
- Founded: 1973
- Ground: Latte Dolce, Sassari, Italy
- Capacity: 1,500
- Owner: (Italy) Abinsula srl
- Chairman: (Italy) Roberto Fresu
- Manager: (Italy) Michele Fini
- League: Serie D
- 2020–21: 10th
- Website: https://www.sassaricalcio.it/
Home colours

Sassari Calcio Latte Dolce is an Italian football club based in Sassari, Sardinia. They currently play in Serie D.

== History ==
The club was founded in 1973 as Unione Sportiva Latte Dolce, as the club of Latte Dolce (Sweet Milk in English), a neighborhood in Sassari, the second largest city in Sardinia.

In the season 2012–13, the team was promoted for the first time, from Eccellenza Sardinia to Serie D to fill the vacancies created. In 2017 the club changed name adding Sassari Calcio in order to represent the entire city together with the historical and older club Sassari Torres. In 2020, participated for the first time to the Coppa Italia, the highest professional cup in Italy, losing in the first round against F.C. Südtirol.

== Stadium ==
The team plays on the Stadio Comunale Latte Dolce in Sassari. On this stadium plays also Settore Giovanile.

== League and cup history ==
Season	Div.	Pos.	Pl.	W	D	L	GS	GA	P	Domestic Cup	Other	Notes
2017–18	Serie D	13/20	34	10	10	14	39	45	40			
2018–19	Serie D	4/20	38	19	14	5	56	32	69			
2019–20	Serie D	5/20	26	14	3	9	40	29	45			
2020–21	Serie D	10/20	34	11	11	12	45	42	44			
2021–22	Serie D											

== See also ==
- S.E.F. Torres 1903
- Torres Calcio Femminile
- Dinamo Basket Sassari
