= Torpè =

- Comune
- Comune di Torpè
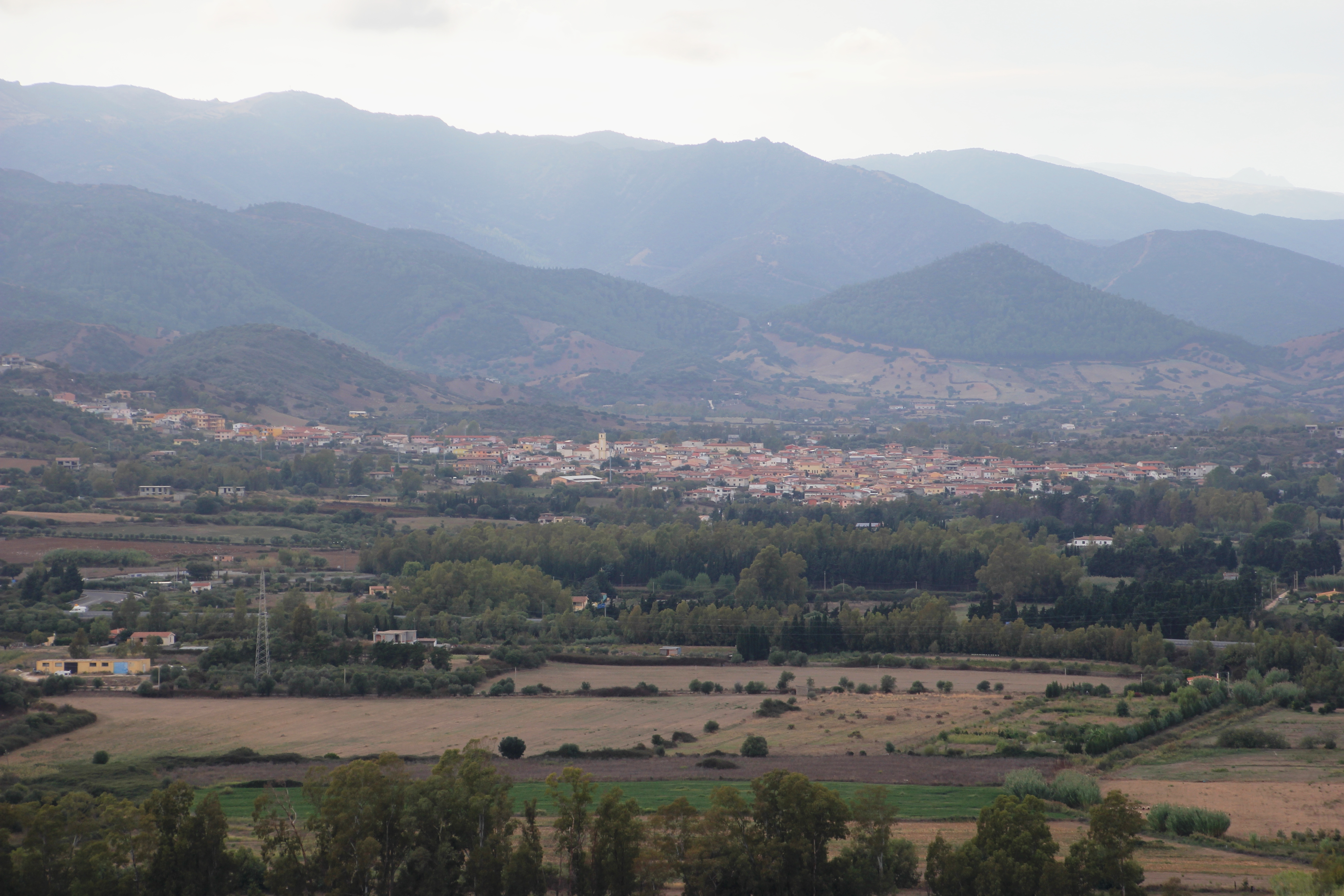
- View of Torpè

- Location within Sardinia
- Coordinates: 40°38′N 9°41′E
- Country: Italy
- Region: Sardinia
- Province: Nuoro (NU)
- Frazioni: Biddanoa

Area
  - Total: 91.50 km^{2} (35.33 sq mi)
- Elevation: 24 m (79 ft)

Population (2026)
  - Total: 2,757
  - Density: 30.13/km^{2} (78.04/sq mi)
- Demonym: Torpeini
- Time zone: UTC+1 (CET)
  - Summer (DST): UTC+2 (CEST)
- Postal code: 08020
- Dialing code: 0784

Torpè is a town and comune (municipality) in the Province of Nuoro in the autonomous island region of Sardinia in Italy, located about 160 kilometres (99 mi) northeast of Cagliari and about 45 kilometres (28 mi) northeast of Nuoro. It has 2,757 inhabitants.

The municipality of Torpè contains the following frazioni (subdivisions): Biddanoa, Talava, Concas, Su cossu, Brunella.

Torpè borders the municipalities of Budoni, Lodè, Padru, Posada, San Teodoro, and Siniscola.

== Climate ==
The climate is CSA (Hot summer Mediterranean) with an annual average temperature of 17.15 Celsius.

Climate data for Torpe (1981-2010)
Month	Jan	Feb	Mar	Apr	May	Jun	Jul	Aug	Sep	Oct	Nov	Dec	Year
Mean daily maximum °C (°F)	14.7 (58.5)	15.3 (59.5)	18.0 (64.4)	20.3 (68.5)	25.1 (77.2)	29.5 (85.1)	32.7 (90.9)	32.9 (91.2)	28.1 (82.6)	24.1 (75.4)	18.6 (65.5)	15.2 (59.4)	22.9 (73.2)
Mean daily minimum °C (°F)	5.0 (41.0)	4.8 (40.6)	6.6 (43.9)	8.6 (47.5)	12.3 (54.1)	16.2 (61.2)	19.0 (66.2)	19.4 (66.9)	16.4 (61.5)	13.1 (55.6)	9.0 (48.2)	6.3 (43.3)	11.4 (52.5)
Average precipitation mm (inches)	64.2 (2.53)	52.0 (2.05)	61.1 (2.41)	59.6 (2.35)	35.8 (1.41)	18.7 (0.74)	5.5 (0.22)	15.3 (0.60)	53.7 (2.11)	76.1 (3.00)	114.3 (4.50)	100.4 (3.95)	656.7 (25.85)
Source: Climatologia della Sardegna per il trentennio 1981-2010

== Demographics ==
As of 2026, the population is 2,757, of which 51.9% are male, and 48.1% are female. Minors make up 14.7% of the population, and seniors make up 25.2%.

Historical population

Year	Pop.	±%
1861	873	—
1871	900	+3.1%
1881	948	+5.3%
1901	1,180	+24.5%
1911	1,370	+16.1%
1921	1,465	+6.9%
1931	1,740	+18.8%
1936	2,018	+16.0%

Year	Pop.	±%
1951	2,519	+24.8%
1961	2,935	+16.5%
1971	2,648	−9.8%
1981	2,590	−2.2%
1991	2,667	+3.0%
2001	2,719	+1.9%
2011	2,891	+6.3%
2021	2,720	−5.9%

Source: ISTAT

=== Immigration ===
As of 2025, immigrants make up 9.2% of the population. The 5 largest foreign countries of birth are Germany, Switzerland, Morocco, Romania, and France.
