= Gazélec Ajaccio =

Football club in Ajaccio, Corsica, France

- Full name: Gazélec Football Club Ajaccio
- Nicknames: Le Gaz (The Gas); Le Bistrot (The Bistro); I diavuli rossi (The Reds Devils); Les Gaziers (The Gasmen)
- Founded: 1910; 116 years ago
- Ground: Stade Ange Casanova
- Capacity: 8,000
- Owner: Louis Poggi
- Chairman: Louis Poggi
- Manager: Erwan Huet
- League: National 3 Group E
- 2024–25: Régional 1 Corsica, 1st of 12 (promoted)
- Website: gfca-foot.corsica
| Home colours | Away colours | Third colours |

Gazélec Football Club Ajaccio (Corsican: Gazélec Football Club Aiacciu), commonly referred to as GFC Ajaccio, GFCA, Gazélec Ajaccio or simply Gazélec (French: [ɡazelɛk]), is a French football club from Ajaccio, Corsica. Founded in 1910, Gazélec played one season in Ligue 1 in the 2015–16 season. As of the 2025–26 season, it competes in the Championnat National 3, the fifth tier of the French football league system.

== History ==
The club was founded in 1960 as result of the merger of two small Ajaccio clubs, Football Club Ajaccien (commonly known as FC Ajaccio), founded in 1930 and Gazélec Corse Club, founded in 1910.

Gazélec reached the semi-finals of the 2011–12 Coupe de France, while playing in the third-tier Championnat National. They hosted home games in the later rounds at the larger Stade François Coty, home of AC Ajaccio.

On 15 May 2015, Gazélec were promoted to Ligue 1 for the first time in the club's history, following a 3–2 win over Niort with two goals by John Tshibumbu. It was their second consecutive promotion and fourth in five years. The team started off the 2015–16 Ligue 1 season as one of the smallest teams to compete in the division's history. They were instantly relegated, in 19th place. In June 2019, the club were relegated to the third tier after a play-off loss to Le Mans. They were relegated again at the end of the truncated 2019–20 Championnat National season, after being in the relegation places when the season was halted due to the COVID-19 pandemic. In 2021, they suffered administrative relegation to the fifth-tier Championnat National 3 for financial reasons.

On 20 December 2022, following the initiation of criminal proceedings against its president of two months, receivership proceedings were commenced by the commercial court of Ajaccio. On 23 January 2023 the club appeared at the commercial court again, where a decision to liquidate it was tabled, under advisement for one week. A week later, the court confirmed the decision, leading to the suspension of the two senior teams of the club from Championnat National 3 and Régional 2, and their results for the season being expunged. On 13 July 2023, the French Football Federation decided that Gazélec Ajaccio could participate in the upcoming season's Régional 2. In the 2023–24 season, they achieved immediate promotion to the Régional 1. They gained a successive promotion to the Championnat National 3 in 2025.

== Honours ==
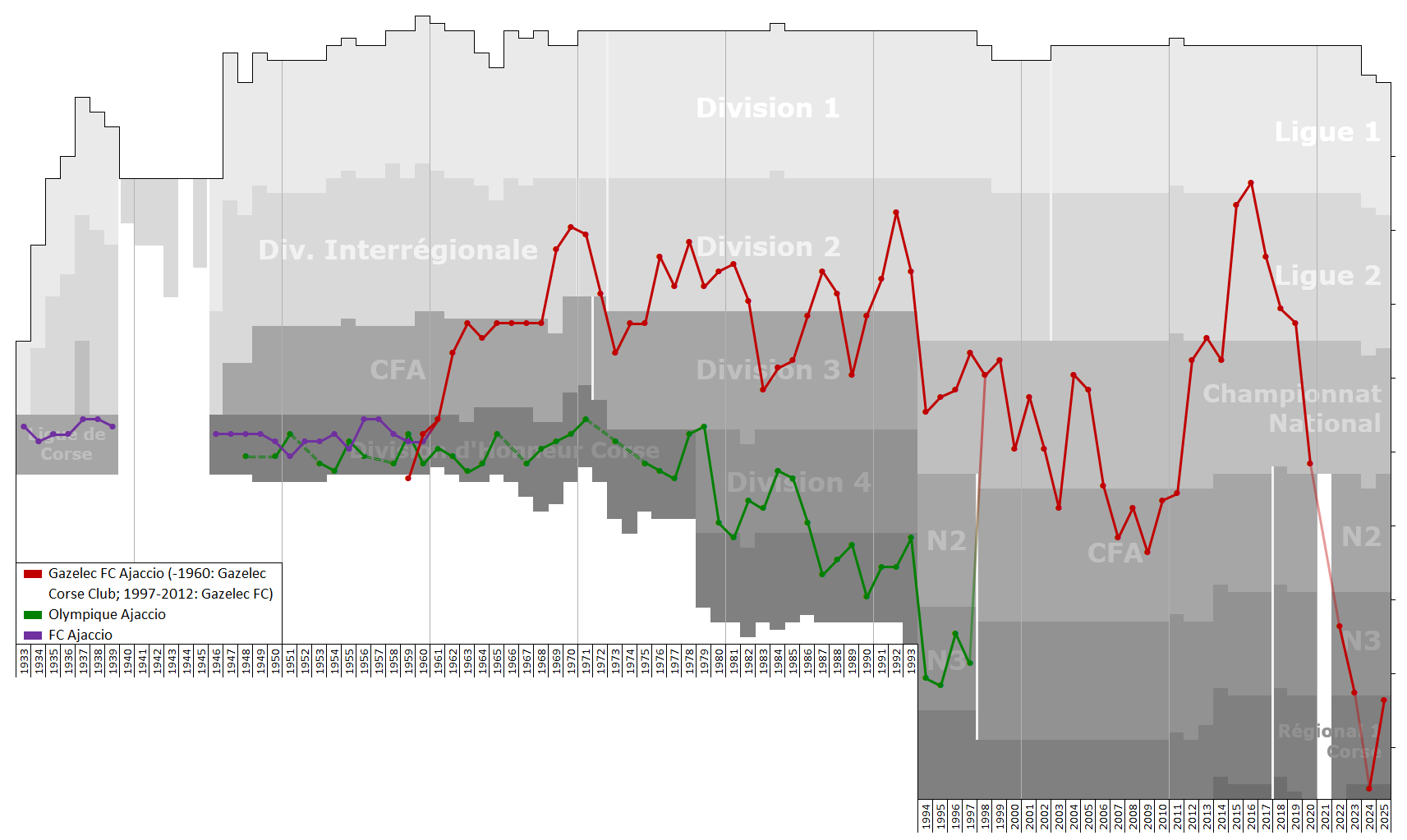
Historical league performance chart of Gazélec Ajaccio

- Ligue 2
  - Runners-up: 2014–15
- Championnat de France Amateurs
  - Champions: 1963, 1965, 1966, 1968, 2002–03, 2010–11
- Régional 2
  - Champions: 2023–24
- Corsican Championship
  - Champions: 1937, 1938, 1956, 1957, 1961

== Current squad ==
As of 29 January 2026

Note: Flags indicate national team as defined under FIFA eligibility rules; some limited exceptions apply. Players may hold more than one non-FIFA nationality.

| No. | Pos. | Nation | Player |
|---|---|---|---|
| 1 | GK | FRA | Cyril Fogacci |
| 2 | DF | FRA | Hassein Mersni |
| 3 | DF | GLP | Max Bonalair |
| 4 | MF | FRA | Laurent Fogacci |
| 5 | DF | FRA | Durell Bilendo Duma |
| 6 | MF | MAR | Yassine Souid |
| 8 | MF | FRA | Nail Kheroua |
| 9 | FW | FRA | Laurent Pomponi |
| 10 | FW | FRA | Maxime Foulon |
| 11 | FW | FRA | Noah Randazzo |
| 12 | FW | FRA | Rakine Bouhadjar |
| 13 | DF | FRA | Lorenzo Maimone-Tacussel |
| 14 | MF | FRA | Francescu Colonna |

| No. | Pos. | Nation | Player |
|---|---|---|---|
| 16 | GK | FRA | Alane Bedfian |
| 18 | DF | FRA | Charles Vittini |
| 20 | MF | FRA | Paul-Antoine Finidori |
| 21 | FW | FRA | Nicolas Canetti |
| 22 | FW | FRA | Vassancy Diomandé |
| 23 | DF | FRA | Lucas Alves |
| 24 | MF | FRA | Kaïs Djellal |
| 27 | DF | FRA | Mathis Fiori |
| 28 | DF | FRA | Laurent Makali Nzazi |
| 29 | DF | FRA | Evan Mailly |
| 30 | GK | FRA | Luca Serra |
| 40 | GK | FRA | Lisandru Guglielmi |
| — | DF | DJI | Yonis Kireh |

== Notable players ==
- (France) Lisandru Olmeta (youth)

== Rivalries ==
The club had rivalries with the other two Corsican professional clubs: SC Bastia and AC Ajaccio, the latter one playing the Ajaccio Derby with Gazélec. For many years, Gazélec played in a lower division than their city rivals. The side also had a rivalry with another smaller club on the island, FC Borgo, a club formed when CA Bastia and Borgo FC merged.

== Coaches ==
- 1960–1961: Fernand Berthon
- 1961–1971: Pierre Cahuzac
- 1971–1976: Guy Calléja
- 1976–1978: Jean Luciano
- 1978–1979: Jacques Berthommier
- 1979–1980: Paul Orsatti
- 1980–1982: Guy Calléja
- 1982–1988: Guy Calléja
- 1988–1989: Baptiste Gentili
- 1989–1990: Guy Calléja
- 1990–1991: Jean-Michel Cavalli
- 1991–1994: Pierre Garcia
- 1994: Marcel Husson
- 1995: Philippe Anziani
- 1995–1998: Paul Orsatti
- 1998–1999: Jean-Michel Cavalli
- 1999–2000: Patrice Buisset
- 2000: Jean-Michel Cavalli
- 2000–01: Hubert Velud
- 2001–03: Jean-Luc Luciani
- 2003–2004: Jean-Luc Luciani
- 2004: Albert Vanucci
- 2004–2005: Baptiste Gentili
- 2005–2010: Patrick Leonetti
- 2010–2012: Dominique Veilex
- 2012–2013: Jean-Michel Cavalli
- 2013–2016: Thierry Laurey
- 2016–2017: Jean-Luc Vannuchi
- 2017–2018: Albert Cartier
- 2018–2019: Hervé Della Maggiore
- 2019–2020: François Ciccolini
- 2020–2022: David Ducourtioux
- 2022–2023: Stéphane Paganelli
