= 2025–26 Stade Rennais FC season =

Stade Rennais FC
2025–26 season
- Owner: Artémis
- President: Arnaud Pouille
- Head coach: Habib Beye (until 9 February); Sébastien Tambouret (caretaker, from 9 to 18 February); Franck Haise (from 18 February)
- Stadium: Roazhon Park
- Ligue 1: 6th
- Coupe de France: Round of 16
- Top goalscorer: League: Esteban Lepaul (20); All: Esteban Lepaul (20)
- Average home league attendance: 27,765
Home colours	Away colours	Third colours

The 2025–26 season was the 125th season in the history of Stade Rennais Football Club, and the club's 32nd consecutive season in Ligue 1. In addition to the domestic league, the club participated in the Coupe de France.

== Players ==
=== First-team squad ===
As of 2 February 2026

Note: Flags indicate national team as defined under FIFA eligibility rules; some limited exceptions apply. Players may hold more than one non-FIFA nationality.

No.	Pos.	Nation	Player
3	DF	FRA	Lilian Brassier
4	MF	FIN	Glen Kamara
6	MF	FRA	Djaoui Cissé
7	FW	SUI	Breel Embolo
9	FW	FRA	Esteban Lepaul
10	FW	FRA	Ludovic Blas
11	FW	JOR	Musa Al-Taamari
17	MF	POL	Sebastian Szymański
18	DF	CMR	Aboubakar Nagida
21	MF	FRA	Valentin Rongier (captain)
24	DF	FRA	Anthony Rouault

No.	Pos.	Nation	Player
26	DF	FRA	Quentin Merlin
30	GK	FRA	Brice Samba
36	DF	GHA	Alidu Seidu
45	MF	FRA	Mahdi Camara
48	DF	MAR	Abdelhamid Aït Boudlal
50	GK	FRA	Mathys Silistrie
65	FW	FRA	Nordan Mukiele
70	FW	FRA	Arnaud Nordin (on loan from Mainz 05)
77	FW	MAR	Yassir Zabiri
95	MF	POL	Przemysław Frankowski (on loan from Galatasaray)
97	DF	FRA	Jérémy Jacquet

=== Out on loan ===
Note: Flags indicate national team as defined under FIFA eligibility rules; some limited exceptions apply. Players may hold more than one non-FIFA nationality.

No.	Pos.	Nation	Player
—	DF	FRA	Rayan Bamba (at Nancy until 30 June 2026)
—	DF	GAB	Jonathan Do Marcolino (at Bourg-Péronnas until 30 June 2026)
—	DF	SEN	Mikayil Faye (at Cremonese until 30 June 2026)
—	DF	NED	Hans Hateboer (at Lyon until 30 June 2026)

No.	Pos.	Nation	Player
—	MF	CIV	Seko Fofana (at Porto until 30 June 2026)
—	MF	DEN	Albert Grønbæk (at Hamburger SV until 30 June 2026)
—	MF	WAL	Jordan James (at Leicester City until 30 June 2026)
—	MF	BEL	Ayanda Sishuba (at Montpellier until 30 June 2026)

== Transfers ==
=== In ===
Pos.	Player	Transferred from	Fee	Date	Source
FW	(France) Esteban Lepaul	(France) Angers	Transfer	28 August 2025	
FW	(Switzerland) Breel Embolo	(France) Monaco	Transfer	1 September 2025	
MF	(Poland) Sebastian Szymański	(Turkey) Fenerbahçe	Transfer	22 January 2026	

=== Out ===
Pos.	Player	Transferred to	Fee	Date	Source
DF	(France) Adrien Truffert	(England) Bournemouth	Transfer, £14.4 million	16 June 2025	
FW	(Japan) Kyōgo Furuhashi	(England) Birmingham City	Transfer, undisclosed	5 July 2025	
MF	(Netherlands) Azor Matusiwa	(England) Ipswich Town	Transfer, undisclosed	13 July 2025	
FW	(France) Arnaud Kalimuendo	(England) Nottingham Forest	Transfer, £26 million	18 August 2025	
MF	(Wales) Jordan James	(England) Leicester City	Loan	1 September 2025	
DF	(Cameroon) Christopher Wooh	(Russia) Spartak Moscow	Transfer, undisclosed	5 September 2025	
MF	(Ivory Coast) Seko Fofana	(Portugal) Porto	Loan	2 February 2026	

== Competitions ==
=== Overall record ===
Competition	First match	Last match	Starting round	Final position	Record							
Competition	First match	Last match	Starting round	Final position	Pld	W	D	L	GF	GA	GD	Win %
Ligue 1	15 August 2025	17 May 2026	Matchday 1	6th	34	17	8	9	59	50	+9	50.00
Coupe de France	21 December 2025	3 February 2026	Round of 64	Round of 16	3	2	0	1	6	4	+2	66.67
Total					37	19	8	10	65	54	+11	51.35

Source: Soccerway

=== Ligue 1 ===
==== League table ====
Pos	Team	Pld	W	D	L	GF	GA	GD	Pts	Qualification or relegation
4	Lyon	34	18	6	10	53	40	+13	60	Qualification for the Champions League third qualifying round
5	Marseille	34	18	5	11	63	45	+18	59	Qualification for the Europa League league phase (Note: Since the 2025–26 Coupe de France winners, Lens, qualified for the Champions League via league position, the Europa League spot awarded to the cup winners was passed to the sixth-placed team, and the Conference League spot was passed to the seventh-placed team.)
6	Rennes	34	17	8	9	59	50	+9	59	Qualification for the Europa League league phase
7	Monaco	34	16	6	12	60	54	+6	54	Qualification for the Conference League play-off round
8	Strasbourg	34	15	8	11	58	47	+11	53	

Source: Ligue 1
Rules for classification: 1) Points; 2) Goal difference; 3) Head-to-head points; 4) Head-to-head goal difference; 5) Head-to-head goals scored; 6) Head-to-head away goals scored; 7) Goals scored; 8) Away goals scored; 9) Fair-play points (Note: Head-to-head record is used only after all the matches between the teams in question have been played).

==== Results summary ====
Overall								Home						Away					
Pld	W	D	L	GF	GA	GD	Pts	W	D	L	GF	GA	GD	W	D	L	GF	GA	GD
34	17	8	9	59	50	+9	59	10	4	3	30	17	+13	7	4	6	29	33	−4

Source: Ligue 1

==== Results by round ====
Round	1	2	3	4	5	6	7	8	9	10	11	12	13	14	15	16	17	18	19	20	21	22	23	24	25	26	27	28	29	30	31	32	33	34
Ground	H	A	A	H	A	H	A	H	H	A	H	A	H	A	A	H	A	H	H	A	A	H	A	H	A	H	H	A	H	A	H	A	H	A
Result	W	L	D	W	D	D	D	D	L	D	W	W	W	W	D	W	W	D	L	L	L	W	W	W	W	L	D	W	W	W	W	L	W	L
Position	7	13	9	6	8	8	10	9	10	10	10	8	6	5	6	6	6	6	6	6	6	6	6	6	5	7	7	7	6	5	5	5	5	6

Source: Ligue 1
A = Away; H = Home; W = Win; D = Draw; L = Loss

==== Matches ====
The match schedule was released on 27 June 2025.

15 August 2025 1	Rennes	1–0	Marseille	Rennes
20:45 CEST (UTC+2)	Aït Boudlal (red card) 31'; Al-Taamari (yellow card) 37'; Rongier (yellow card) 89'; Blas 90+1'	Report	Rabiot (yellow card) 26'; Garcia (yellow card) 84'; Balerdi (yellow card) 90+4'	Stadium: Roazhon Park; Attendance: 28,360; Referee: Jérémie Pignard

24 August 2025 2	Lorient	4–0	Rennes	Lorient
15:00 CEST (UTC+2)	Karim (yellow card) 35'; Mendy (yellow card) 41'; Soumano (yellow card) 45', (goal) 45+4'; Aiyegun 47'; Pagis 65'; Le Bris 69'; Kouassi (yellow card) 71'; Katseris (yellow card) 84'; Abergel (yellow card) 86'	Report	Camara (red card) 6'; Wooh (red card) 11'	Stadium: Stade du Moustoir; Attendance: 12,343; Referee: Jérome Brisard

31 August 2025 3	Angers	1–1	Rennes	Angers
15:00 CEST (UTC+2)	Belkhdim (yellow card) 24'; Cherif (yellow card) 49'; Peter 51'	Report	Lepaul 21'; Jacquet (yellow card) 32'; Frankowski (yellow card) 42'	Stadium: Stade Raymond Kopa; Attendance: 11,512; Referee: Marc Bollengier

14 September 2025 4	Rennes	3–1	Lyon	Rennes
20:45 CEST (UTC+2)	Frankowski (yellow card) 26'; Seidu (yellow card) 47'; Rouault 80'; Descamps 90+3' (o.g.); Meïté 90+5'	Report	Tolisso 14', (yellow card) 43'; Mata (yellow card) 53'; Morton (red card) 75'	Stadium: Roazhon Park; Attendance: 27,392; Referee: Ruddy Buquet

20 September 2025 5	Nantes	2–2	Rennes	Nantes
17:00 CEST (UTC+2)	Tati (yellow card) 6'; Mohamed (yellow card) 38'; Mwanga 64'; Abline (penalty missed) 90+2'; El Arabi 90+6'	Report	Blas 29' (pen.); Lepaul 35'; Cissé (yellow card) 63'; Rouault (yellow card) 68'	Stadium: Stade de la Beaujoire; Attendance: 31,337; Referee: Mathieu Vernice

28 September 2025 6	Rennes	0–0	Lens	Rennes
20:45 CEST (UTC+2)	Camara (yellow card) 63'; Nagida (yellow card) 85'; Jacquet (yellow card) 90+2'	Report	Gradit (red card) 1'; Thomasson (yellow card) 40'; Guilavogui (yellow card) 90+3'; Sotoca (yellow card) 90+3'	Stadium: Roazhon Park; Attendance: 26,414; Referee: Bastien Dechepy

5 October 2025 7	Le Havre	2–2	Rennes	Le Havre
17:15 CEST (UTC+2)	Ebonog (yellow card) 34'; Soumaré 45+1' (pen.); Ndiaye 79'	Report	Embolo 10'; Lepaul 29'; Jacquet (yellow card) 44'; Rongier (yellow card) 64'	Stadium: Stade Océane; Attendance: 17,802; Referee: Jérémie Pignard

19 October 2025 8	Rennes	2–2	Auxerre	Rennes
20:45 CEST (UTC+2)	Embolo 18'; Fofana 59'; Rouault (yellow card) 69'	Report	Namaso 8'; Akpa (yellow card) 45'; Casimir (yellow card) 45+3'; Dioussé (yellow card) 90'; Sinayoko 72' (pen.)	Stadium: Roazhon Park; Attendance: 27,148; Referee: Éric Wattellier

26 October 2025 9	Rennes	1–2	Nice	Rennes
18:15 CEST (UTC+2)	Camara (yellow card) 29'; Aït Boudlal 67'; Frankowski (yellow card) 68'; Embolo (yellow card) 78'; Cissé (yellow card) 78'; Samba (yellow card) 83'	Report	Vanhoutte (yellow card) 31'; Diop 38'; Clauss 45+1'; Louchet (yellow card) 66'	Stadium: Roazhon Park; Attendance: 27,658; Referee: Marc Bollengier

29 October 2025 10	Toulouse	2–2	Rennes	Toulouse
22:05 CEST (UTC+2)	Cresswell 58'; Nicolaisen (yellow card) 78'; Dønnum 85' (pen.), (yellow card) 90+3'	Report	Aït Boudlal (yellow card) 45+1'; Lepaul 50'; Al-Taamari 54', (yellow card) 63'; Samba (yellow card) 75'	Stadium: Stadium de Toulouse; Attendance: 25,484; Referee: Clément Turpin

2 November 2025 11	Rennes	4–1	Strasbourg	Rennes
15:00 CET (UTC+1)	Lepaul 9', 48', 60'; Meïté 35'; Frankowski (yellow card) 90+4'	Report	Nanasi 77'; Chilwell (yellow card) 83'	Stadium: Roazhon Park; Attendance: 27,658; Referee: Thomas Léonard

7 November 2025 12	Paris FC	0–1	Rennes	Paris
20:45 CET (UTC+1)	De Smet (yellow card) 57'; Lopez (yellow card) 79'; Otávio (yellow card) 90+3'; Kebbal (yellow card) 90+6'	Report	Camara (yellow card) 74'; Embolo 81'; Rouault (yellow card) 90+2'	Stadium: Stade Jean-Bouin; Attendance: 16,587; Referee: Guillaume Paradis

22 November 2025 13	Rennes	4–1	Monaco	Rennes
19:00 CET (UTC+1)	Boudlal 20'; Camara 48'; Embolo 73'; Blas 83' (pen.)	Report	Akliouche (yellow card) 19'; Zakaria (red card) 65'; Biereth 90+5'	Stadium: Roazhon Park; Attendance: 27,681; Referee: Hakim Ben El Hadj

28 November 2025 14	Metz	0–1	Rennes	Metz
20:45 CET (UTC+1)		Report	Rongier 22'	Stadium: Stade Saint-Symphorien; Attendance: 20,291; Referee: Jeremy Stinat

6 December 2025 15	Paris Saint-Germain	5–0	Rennes	Paris
21:05 CET (UTC+1)	Kvaratskhelia 28', 67'; Mayulu 39'; Mbaye 88'; Ramos 90+1'	Report	Jacquet (yellow card) 53' (yellow-red card) 74'; Aït Boudlal (yellow card) 69'	Stadium: Parc des Princes; Attendance: 47,823; Referee: Marc Bollengier

13 December 2025 16	Rennes	3–1	Brest	Rennes
17:00 CET (UTC+1)	Lepaul 24'; Al-Taamari 25', (yellow card) 29'; Meïté 87'; Samba (yellow card) 90'	Report	Baldé 13'; Doumbia (yellow card) 64'; Coulibaly (yellow card) 86'; Dina Ebimbe (yellow card) 90+1'	Stadium: Roazhon Park; Attendance: 27,959; Referee: Benoit Millot

3 January 2026 17	Lille	0–2	Rennes	Villeneuve-d'Ascq
21:05 CET (UTC+1)	Alexsandro (red card) 13'; André (yellow card) 14'	Report	Jacquet (yellow card) 30'; Frankowski 49'; Merlin 56'	Stadium: Stade Pierre-Mauroy; Attendance: 41,527; Referee: Eric Wattellier

18 January 2026 18	Rennes	1–1	Le Havre	Rennes
17:15 CET (UTC+1)	Al-Taamari (yellow card) 33'; Embolo 86'	Report	Mambimbi 69'; Quetant (yellow card) 72'; M'Pasi (yellow card) 75'; Ebonog (yellow card) 90'; Samatta (yellow card) 90+10'	Stadium: Roazhon Park; Attendance: 27,650; Referee: Stephanie Frappart

24 January 2026 19	Rennes	0–2	Lorient	Rennes
17:00 CET (UTC+1)	Lepaul (yellow card) 19'; Rongier (yellow card) 32'	Report	Makengo 3'; Pagis 77'	Stadium: Roazhon Park; Attendance: 28,659; Referee: Clement Turpin

31 January 2025 20	Monaco	4–0	Rennes	Monaco
21:05 CET (UTC+1)	Teze (yellow card) 22'; Fati 33'; Akliouche 50'; Coulibaly 59'; Idumbo 89'	Report	Embolo (yellow card) 12'; Brassier (yellow card) 28'	Stadium: Stade Louis II; Attendance: 5,319; Referee: Ruddy Buquet

7 February 2026 21	Lens	3–1	Rennes	Lens
17:00 CET (UTC+1)	Aguilar 54', (yellow card) 32' (yellow-red card) 56'; Thomasson (yellow card) 36'; Édouard 41'; Sangaré (yellow card) 45+2'; Saint-Maximin 78'	Report	Lepaul 8'; Embolo (yellow card) 45'; Nordin (yellow card) 61'	Stadium: Stade Bollaert-Delelis; Attendance: 38,174; Referee: Jérémie Pignard

13 February 2026 22	Rennes	3–1	Paris Saint-Germain	Rennes
19:00 CET (UTC+1)	Al-Taamari 34'; Lepaul 69'; Embolo 81'	Report	Dembélé 71'	Stadium: Roazhon Park; Attendance: 28,545; Referee: Benoît Bastien

22 February 2026 23	Auxerre	0–3	Rennes	Auxerre
15:00 CET (UTC+1)	Owusu (yellow card) 55'	Report	Camara 20', 45', (yellow card) 85'; Lepaul 22'; Merlin (yellow card) 47'; Rongier (yellow card) 76'; Rouault (yellow card) 81'	Stadium: Stade de l'Abbé-Deschamps; Attendance: 15,894; Referee: Gaël Angoula

28 February 2026 24	Rennes	1–0	Toulouse	Rennes
17:00 CET (UTC+1)	Lepaul (yellow card) 24'; Nordin 27'	Report	Diop (yellow card) 42'; Cresswell (yellow card) 45+1'; Vossah (yellow card) 62'	Stadium: Roazhon Park; Attendance: 28,060; Referee: Stéphanie Frappart

8 March 2026 25	Nice	0–4	Rennes	Nice
18:15 CET (UTC+1)	Dante (yellow card) 36'; Gouveia (yellow card) 86'	Report	Lepaul 13', (penalty missed) 36'; Szymański 20'; Blas 74'; Cissé (yellow card) 81'; Mukiele 90+2'	Stadium: Allianz Riviera; Attendance: 21,134; Referee: Romain Lissorgue

15 March 2026 26	Rennes	1–2	Lille	Rennes
20:45 CET (UTC+1)	Lepaul 59'; Nagida (yellow card) 65'; Frankowski (yellow card) 84'	Report	Fernandez-Pardo 2'; Bentaleb (yellow card) 16'; Haraldsson 47'; Özer (yellow card) 71'; Mandi (yellow card) 73'; Correia (yellow card) 84'; Ngoy (yellow card) 90+2'	Stadium: Roazhon Park; Attendance: 28,219; Referee: Jérôme Brisard

22 March 2026 27	Rennes	0–0	Metz	Rennes
18:15 CET (UTC+1)	Rouault (yellow card) 33'	Report	Touré (yellow card) 32'; Yegbe (yellow card) 78'; Sané (yellow card) 88'	Stadium: Roazhon Park; Attendance: 28,206; Referee: Bastien Dechepy

4 April 2026 28	Brest	3–4	Rennes	Brest
19:00 CEST (UTC+2)	Dina Ebimbe 4', 70'; Coudert (yellow card) 34'; Diaz (yellow card) 39'; Lascary 70'; Magnetti (yellow card) 73'	Report	Blas 20'; Rongier (yellow card) 36'; Lepaul 34' (pen.), 74' (pen.); Brassier (yellow card) 60'; Embolo 63'; Samba (yellow card) 90+2'	Stadium: Stade Francis-Le Blé; Attendance: 15,031; Referee: Marc Bollengier

11 April 2026 29	Rennes	2–1	Angers	Rennes
21:05 CEST (UTC+2)	Louër 12' (o.g.); Al-Taamari 25'	Report	Camara (yellow card) 15'; Peter 65'; Louër (yellow card) 72'; Sbaï (penalty missed) 81'	Stadium: Roazhon Park; Attendance: 26,749; Referee: Mathieu Vernice

19 April 2026 30	Strasbourg	0–3	Rennes	Strasbourg
17:15 CEST (UTC+2)		Report	Lepaul 20'; Szymański (yellow card) 44'; Embolo 50'; Al-Taamari 52'	Stadium: Stade de la Meinau; Attendance: 29,000; Referee: Ruddy Buquet

26 April 2026 31	Rennes	2–1	Nantes	Rennes
17:15 CEST (UTC+2)	Lepaul 8' (pen.); Aït Boudlal (yellow card) 73'; Rongier (yellow card) 88', (goal) 90+2'; Szymański (yellow card) 90+6'	Report	Cozza (yellow card) 38'; Ganago 40'; Machado (yellow card) 50'	Stadium: Roazhon Park; Referee: Benoît Bastien

3 May 2026 32	Lyon	3–1	Rennes	Décines-Charpieu
20:45 CEST (UTC+2)	Frankowski (yellow card) 26'; Seidu (yellow card) 47'; Rouault 80'; Descamps 90+3' (o.g.); Meïté 90+5'	Report	Tolisso 14', (yellow card) 43'; Mata (yellow card) 53'; Morton (red card) 75'	Stadium: Parc Olympique Lyonnais; Attendance: 27,392; Referee: Ruddy Buquet

10 May 2026 33	Rennes	2–1	Paris FC	Rennes
21:00 CEST (UTC+2)	Lepaul 74'; Embolo 75'	Report	Geubbels 53'; Immobile (yellow card) 89'	Stadium: Roazhon Park; Attendance: 28,074; Referee: Thomas Léonard

17 May 2026 34	Marseille	3–1	Rennes	Marseille
21:00 CEST (UTC+2)	Højbjerg 2', (yellow card) 49'; Gouiri 10', (yellow card) 76'; Aubameyang 55'; Pavard (yellow card) 90+5'	Report	Camara (yellow card) 79'; Lepaul 84'	Stadium: Stade Vélodrome; Attendance: 62,124; Referee: Ruddy Buquet

=== Coupe de France ===
21 December 2025 Round of 64	Rennes	3–0	Les Sables Vendée Foot	Rennes
15:30 CET (UTC+1)	Blas (yellow card) 67'; Embolo 69', 80'; Merlin 84'	Report	Robin (yellow card) 63'	Stadium: Roazhon Park; Attendance: 15,370; Referee: Alexandre Perreau Niel

11 January 2025 Round of 32	Chantilly	1–3	Rennes	Beauvais
18:00 CET (UTC+1)	Sissoko (yellow card) 6'; Joseph 42'; Yatabaré (red card) 68'	Report	Merlin 70'; Al-Taamari 71'; Legendre 78'	Stadium: Stade Pierre Brisson; Attendance: 7,526; Referee: Jérémie Pignard

3 February 2026 Round of 16	Marseille	3–0	Rennes	Marseille
21:10 CET (UTC+1)	Gouiri 2'; Nwaneri (yellow card) 22'; Højbjerg (yellow card) 45+3'; Greenwood 46'; Aubameyang 83'; Kondogbia (yellow card) 90'; Balerdi (yellow card) 90'	Report	Seidu (yellow card) 42'; Merlin (yellow card) 67'; Aït Boudlal (yellow card) 74'; Embolo (yellow card) 90'	Stadium: Stade Vélodrome; Attendance: 61,783; Referee: Thomas Léonard
