= Do Marcolino =

Do Marcolino is a Gabonese surname. Notable people with the surname include:

- Alan Do Marcolino (born 2002), Gabonese football striker
- Arsène Do Marcolino (born 1986), Gabonese football defender
- Fabrice Do Marcolino (born 1983), Gabonese football striker
- Jonathan Do Marcolino (born 2006), Gabonese football left-back
- Henrick Do Marcolino (born 2006), French football midfielder
