= 2026–27 Stade Rennais FC season =

Stade Rennais FC
2026–27 season
- Owner: Artémis
- President: Arnaud Pouille
- Head coach: Franck Haise
- Stadium: Roazhon Park
- Ligue 1: 3rd
- Coupe de France: Round of 64
- UEFA Europa League: League phase
| Home colours | Away colours | Third colours |
- All statistics correct as of 11 September 2026.

The 2026–27 season is the 126th season in the history of Stade Rennais Football Club, and the club's 33rd consecutive season in Ligue 1. In addition to the domestic league, the club is participating in the Coupe de France and the UEFA Europa League.

== Players ==
=== First-team squad ===
As of 2 September 2026

Note: Flags indicate national team as defined under FIFA eligibility rules; some limited exceptions apply. Players may hold more than one non-FIFA nationality.

| No. | Pos. | Nation | Player |
|---|---|---|---|
| 4 | DF | ENG | Charlie Cresswell (on loan from Toulouse) |
| 5 | DF | POR | Gonçalo Oliveira |
| 6 | MF | FRA | Djaoui Cissé |
| 9 | FW | FRA | Esteban Lepaul |
| 10 | MF | FRA | Ludovic Blas |
| 11 | FW | JOR | Musa Al-Taamari |
| 12 | FW | ESP | Eliezer Mayenda |
| 14 | DF | USA | Bryan Reynolds |
| 16 | GK | FRA | Nicolas Lemaître |
| 17 | MF | POL | Sebastian Szymański |
| 18 | DF | CMR | Aboubakar Nagida |
| 21 | MF | FRA | Valentin Rongier (captain) |
| 22 | FW | SEN | Boulaye Dia (on loan from Lazio) |
| 24 | DF | FRA | Anthony Rouault |

| No. | Pos. | Nation | Player |
|---|---|---|---|
| 26 | DF | FRA | Quentin Merlin |
| 28 | MF | FRA | Adrien Thomasson |
| 30 | GK | FRA | Brice Samba |
| 35 | FW | ECU | Elías Legendre |
| 36 | DF | GHA | Alidu Seidu |
| 45 | MF | FRA | Mahdi Camara |
| 48 | DF | MAR | Abdelhamid Aït Boudlal |
| 60 | GK | ALG | Kilian Belazzoug |
| 64 | DF | GAB | Jonathan Do Marcolino |
| 70 | FW | FRA | Arnaud Nordin |
| 90 | FW | SEN | Issa Soumaré |
| 95 | MF | POL | Przemysław Frankowski (on loan from Galatasaray) |
| — | MF | BEL | Ayanda Sishuba |

=== Out on loan ===
Note: Flags indicate national team as defined under FIFA eligibility rules; some limited exceptions apply. Players may hold more than one non-FIFA nationality.

| No. | Pos. | Nation | Player |
|---|---|---|---|
| — | GK | FRA | Mathys Silistrie (at Quevilly-Rouen until 30 June 2027) |
| — | DF | SEN | Mikayil Faye (at 1. FC Nürnberg until 30 June 2027) |
| — | DF | FRA | Rayan Bamba (at Le Mans until 30 June 2027) |
| — | MF | CIV | Seko Fofana (at Porto until 30 June 2027) |
| — | MF | WAL | Jordan James (at Wolverhampton Wanderers until 30 June 2027) |

| No. | Pos. | Nation | Player |
|---|---|---|---|
| — | MF | FIN | Glen Kamara (at Queens Park Rangers until 30 June 2027) |
| — | MF | FRA | Paolo Limon (at Villefranche until 30 June 2027) |
| — | FW | FRA | Nordan Mukiele (at Montpellier until 30 June 2027) |
| — | FW | FRA | Lucas Rosier (at Concarneau until 30 June 2027) |
| — | FW | MAR | Yassir Zabiri (at Racing Santander until 30 June 2027) |

== Transfers ==
=== In ===
| Pos. | Player | Transferred from | Fee | Date | Source |
|---|---|---|---|---|---|
| MF | (France) Rayan Bamba | (France) Nancy | Loan return | 30 June 2026 | |
| DF | (Senegal) Mikayil Faye | (Italy) Cremonese | Loan return | 30 June 2026 | |
| MF | (Ivory Coast) Seko Fofana | (Portugal) Porto | Loan return | 30 June 2026 | |
| DF | (Netherlands) Hans Hateboer | (France) Lyon | Loan return | 30 June 2026 | |
| MF | (Wales) Jordan James | (England) Leicester City | Loan return | 30 June 2026 | |
| MF | (Belgium) Ayanda Sishuba | (France) Montpellier | Loan return | 30 June 2026 | |
| GK | (France) Nicolas Lemaître | (France) Troyes | Free | 1 July 2026 | |
| DF | (Portugal) Gonçalo Oliveira | (Portugal) Benfica B | Undisclosed | 1 July 2026 | |
| FW | (Senegal) Issa Soumaré | (France) Le Havre | Free | 1 July 2026 | |
| MF | (France) Adrien Thomasson | (France) Lens | Free | 1 July 2026 | |

=== Out ===
| Pos. | Player | Transferred to | Fee | Date | Source |
|---|---|---|---|---|---|
| MF | (Poland) Przemysław Frankowski | (Turkey) Galatasaray | Loan return | 30 June 2026 | |
| FW | (France) Arnaud Nordin | (Germany) Mainz 05 | Loan return | 30 June 2026 | |
| MF | (Denmark) Albert Grønbæk | (Germany) Hamburger SV | Loan made permanent | 1 July 2026 | |
| DF | (France) Jérémy Jacquet | (England) Liverpool | £60,000,000 | 1 July 2026 | |
| DF | (Norway) Leo Østigård | (Italy) Genoa | Loan made permanent | 1 July 2026 | |

== Pre-season and friendlies ==
| 9 July 2026 Friendly | Rennes (France) | 1–2 | (France) Caen |
| 14:00 |

| 25 July 2026 Friendly | Rennes (France) | 2–1 | (Belgium) Club Brugge |
| 18:00 |

== Competitions ==
=== Overall record ===
| Competition | First match | Last match | Starting round | Final position | Record | | | | | | | |
| Competition | First match | Last match | Starting round | Final position | Pld | W | D | L | GF | GA | GD | Win % |
|---|---|---|---|---|---|---|---|---|---|---|---|---|
| Ligue 1 | 23 August 2026 | 29 May 2027 | Matchday 1 | TBD | 9 | 5 | 1 | 3 | 20 | 19 | +1 | 55.56 |
| Coupe de France | 19–21 December 2026 | TBD | Round of 64 | TBD | 0 | 0 | 0 | 0 | 0 | 0 | +0 | — |
| UEFA Europa League | 16 September 2026 | TBD | League phase | TBD | 3 | 1 | 2 | 0 | 4 | 3 | +1 | 33.33 |
| Total | | | | | 12 | 6 | 3 | 3 | 24 | 22 | +2 | 50.00 |

Last updated: 30 October 2026
Source: Soccerway

=== Ligue 1 ===
==== League table ====
| Pos | Team | Pld | W | D | L | GF | GA | GD | Pts | Qualification or relegation |
|---|---|---|---|---|---|---|---|---|---|---|
| 6 | Nice | 10 | 5 | 2 | 3 | 15 | 12 | +3 | 17 | Qualification for the Conference League play-off round |
| 7 | Monaco | 10 | 4 | 4 | 2 | 13 | 11 | +2 | 16 | |
| 8 | Rennes | 10 | 5 | 1 | 4 | 21 | 21 | 0 | 16 | |
| 9 | Brest | 10 | 4 | 3 | 3 | 18 | 12 | +6 | 15 | |
| 10 | Lorient | 10 | 4 | 3 | 3 | 9 | 8 | +1 | 15 | |

Updated to match(es) played on 8 November 2026. Source: Ligue 1
Rules for classification: 1) Points; 2) Goal difference; 3) Head-to-head points; 4) Head-to-head goal difference; 5) Goals scored; 6) Wins; 7) Away wins; 8) Fair-play points; 9) Drawing of lots.
(Note: Head-to-head record is used only after all the matches between the teams in question have been played).

==== Results summary ====
| Overall | | | | | | | | Home | | | | | | Away | | | | | |
| Pld | W | D | L | GF | GA | GD | Pts | W | D | L | GF | GA | GD | W | D | L | GF | GA | GD |
|---|---|---|---|---|---|---|---|---|---|---|---|---|---|---|---|---|---|---|---|
| 4 | 3 | 1 | 0 | 8 | 5 | +3 | 10 | 2 | 1 | 0 | 6 | 4 | +2 | 1 | 0 | 0 | 2 | 1 | +1 |

Last updated: 11 September 2026.
Source: Ligue 1

==== Results by round ====
| Round | 1 | 2 | 3 | 4 | 5 | 6 | 7 | 8 | 9 | 10 | 11 | 12 | 13 | 14 | 15 | 16 | 17 | 18 | 19 | 20 | 21 | 22 | 23 | 24 | 25 | 26 | 27 | 28 | 29 | 30 | 31 | 32 | 33 | 34 |
|---|---|---|---|---|---|---|---|---|---|---|---|---|---|---|---|---|---|---|---|---|---|---|---|---|---|---|---|---|---|---|---|---|---|---|
| Ground | H | H | A | H | A | H | A | H | A | H | A | A | H | H | A | H | A | H | H | A | H | A | A | A | H | A | A | H | A | H | H | A | A | H |
| Result | D | W | W | W | | | | | | | | | | | | | | | | | | | | | | | | | | | | | | |
| Position | 6 | 5 | 5 | 3 | | | | | | | | | | | | | | | | | | | | | | | | | | | | | | |

Updated to match(es) played on 11 September 2026. Source: Ligue 1
A = Away; H = Home; W = Win; D = Draw; L = Loss

==== Matches ====
The league fixtures was announced on 10 June 2026.

| 23 August 2026 1 | Rennes | 2–2 | Paris Saint-Germain | Rennes |
| 20:45 CEST (UTC+2) | Szymański 9'; Lepaul 38'; Thomasson (yellow card) 42'; Al-Taamari (yellow card) 63' | Report | Torres 71', 82'; Marquinhos (yellow card) 78'; Hakimi (yellow card) 84' | Stadium: Roazhon Park; Attendance: 28,255; Referee: Bastien Dechepy |

| 30 August 2026 2 | Rennes | 3–2 | Le Mans | Rennes |
| 17:15 CEST (UTC+2) | Lepaul 5', 90+6' (pen.), (yellow card) 90+6'; Rongier 26'; Soumaré (yellow card) 48'; Aït Boudlal (yellow card) 90+12' | Report | Mafouta 30', 54' (pen.); Lauray (yellow card) 66'; Sidibé (red card) 68'; Voyer (yellow card) 90+13' | Stadium: Roazhon Park; Attendance: 25,727; Referee: Romain Lissorgue |

| 6 September 2026 3 | Angers | 1–2 | Rennes | Angers |
| 17:15 CEST (UTC+2) | Arcus 35'; Kalulu (yellow card) 90+3' | Report | Frankowski 9'; Lefort 17' (o.g.); Cresswell (yellow card) 58' | Stadium: Stade Raymond Kopa; Referee: Geoffrey Kubler |

| 11 September 2026 4 | Rennes | 1–0 | Marseille | Rennes |
| 20:45 CEST (UTC+2) | Frankowski (yellow card) 43'; Thomasson 52' | Report | Abdelli (yellow card) 33'; Paixão (yellow card) 43'; Harit (yellow card) 85'; Weah (yellow card) 90+4' | Stadium: Roazhon Park; Attendance: 28,384; Referee: Jérémy Stinat |

=== UEFA Europa League ===
==== League phase ====
The draw for the league phase was held on 28 August 2026.

| Pos | Team | Pld | W | D | L | GF | GA | GD | Pts | Qualification |
|---|---|---|---|---|---|---|---|---|---|---|
| 15 | (Belgium) Anderlecht | 4 | 2 | 0 | 2 | 6 | 3 | +3 | 6 | Advance to knockout phase play-offs (seeded) |
| 16 | (Greece) OFI | 4 | 2 | 0 | 2 | 5 | 4 | +1 | 6 | Advance to knockout phase play-offs (seeded) |
| 17 | (France) Rennes | 4 | 1 | 3 | 0 | 4 | 3 | +1 | 6 | Advance to knockout phase play-offs (unseeded) |
| 18 | (Cyprus) Omonia | 4 | 2 | 0 | 2 | 6 | 7 | −1 | 6 | Advance to knockout phase play-offs (unseeded) |
| 19 | (Portugal) Torreense | 4 | 2 | 0 | 2 | 7 | 9 | −2 | 6 | Advance to knockout phase play-offs (unseeded) |

Updated to match(es) played on 5 November 2026. Source: UEFA
Rules for classification: League phase tiebreakers

| Round | 1 | 2 | 3 | 4 | 5 | 6 | 7 | 8 |
|---|---|---|---|---|---|---|---|---|
| Ground | A | H | A | H | A | H | H | A |
| Result | | | | | | | | |
| Position | | | | | | | | |

Source: UEFA
A = Away; H = Home; W = Win; D = Draw; L = Loss
