= Henrick Do Marcolino =

French footballer

Personal information
- Date of birth: 21 March 2006 (age 20)
- Place of birth: Vannes, Francee
- Height: 1.79 m (5 ft 10 in)
- Position: Attacking midfielder

Team information
- Current team: Rennes
- Number: 69

Youth career
- 2019–2024: Rennes

Senior career*
Years	Team	Apps	(Gls)
2024–	Rennes II	45	(9)
2026–	Rennes	2	(0)

International career^{‡}
2026–	Gabon	2	(0)
- * Club domestic league appearances and goals as of 18:15, 24 August 2026 (UTC) ‡ National team caps and goals as of 22:18, 29 September 2026 (UTC)

Henrick Do Marcolino (born 21 March 2006) is a professional footballer who plays as an attacking midfielder for the Ligue 1 club Rennes. Born in France, he represents the Gabon national team.

== Club career ==
Do Marcolino joined the youth academy of Rennes in 2019. He was promoted to their reserves in 2024. He made his senior and professional debut with Rennes as a substitute in a 3–0 win over AJ Auxerre on 22 February 2026.

== International career ==
On 25 September 2026, Do Marcolino made his debut for the Gabon national team in an AFCON qualifier against Morocco.

== Personal life ==
Born in France, Do Marcolino is of Gabonese descent and holds dual French-Gabonese citizenship. He comes from a family of footballers: his father Fabrice, uncle Arsène, brother Alan, and cousin Jonathan Do Marcolino, are all professional footballers.

== Career statistics ==
=== Club ===
As of match played 24 August 2026

Appearances and goals by club, season and competition
Club	Season	League			Cup		Europe		Other		Total	
Club	Season	Division	Apps	Goals	Apps	Goals	Apps	Goals	Apps	Goals	Apps	Goals
Rennes B	2023–24	CFA 2	2	0	—		—		—		2	0
Rennes B	2024–25	CFA 2	23	6	—		—		—		23	6
Rennes B	2025–26	CFA 2	19	3	—		—		—		19	3
Rennes B	2026–27	CFA 2	1	0	—		—		—		1	0
Rennes B	Total		45	9	—		—		—		45	9
Rennes	2025–26	Ligue 1	1	0	—		—		—		1	0
Rennes	2026–27	Ligue 1	1	0	0	0	0	0	—		1	0
Rennes	Total		2	0	0	0	0	0	—		2	0
Career total			47	9	0	0	0	0	0	0	47	9

=== International ===
As of match played 29 September 2026

Appearances and goals by national team and year
National team	Year	Apps	Goals
Gabon	2026	2	0
Total		2	0
