= Marcolino =

Marcolino is a Portuguese given name. Notable people with the name include:

- Marcolino (footballer) (born 1996), Marcolino Neto Silva Lima de Sá, Brazilian footballer
- Marcolino Gomes Candau (1911–1983), Brazilian doctor
- Marcolino Moco (born 1953), Angolan politician

== See also ==
- Estádio Marcolino de Castro, multi-use stadium in Santa Maria da Feira, Portugal
- Do Marcolino, surname
