= Gonçalo Oliveira =

Gonçalo Oliveira may refer to:

- Gonçalo Oliveira (tennis) (born 1995), Venezuelan tennis player also known as Gonzalo Oliveira
- Gonçalo Oliveira (footballer) (born 2006), Portuguese footballer
