= Esteban Lepaul =

French footballer (born 2000)

Estéban Lepaul
Personal information
- Date of birth: 18 April 2000 (age 26)
- Place of birth: Auxerre, France
- Height: 1.77 m (5 ft 10 in)
- Position: Forward

Team information
- Current team: Rennes
- Number: 9

Youth career
- 2010–2011: US Baldenheim
- 2011–2013: Racing HW 96
- 2013–2015: Colmar
- 2015–2020: Lyon

Senior career*
Years	Team	Apps	(Gls)
2018–2020	Lyon B	8	(1)
2020–2021	Épinal	8	(5)
2021–2023	Orléans B	13	(13)
2021–2023	Orléans	55	(10)
2023–2024	Épinal	16	(12)
2024–2025	Angers	47	(13)
2025–	Rennes	39	(27)

International career^{‡}
2026–	France	3	(0)
- * Club domestic league appearances and goals as of 17:15, 18 October 2026 (UTC) ‡ National team caps and goals as of 20:36, 5 October 2026 (UTC)

Estéban Lepaul (born 18 April 2000) is a French professional footballer who plays as a forward for Ligue 1 club Rennes and the France national team.

== Early career ==
Lepaul began his youth career by playing for Baldenheim and Colmar before he was recruited to the Lyon football academy in 2015.

== Club career ==
=== Épinal ===
In August 2020, Lepaul joined Championnat National 2 club Épinal. He scored 5 goals after 8 matches before the season was cancelled due to the COVID-19 pandemic in France.

=== Orléans ===
In July 2021, Lepaul joined Orléans in the Championnat National, signing a two-year contract. He scored 10 goals after a total of 56 appearances for the club.

=== Épinal ===
On 5 July 2023, Lepaul made his return to Épinal, who now promoted to the Championnat National. He scored 12 goals after 16 matches, making him the top scorer during the first half of 2023–24 Championnat National season.

=== Angers ===
On 25 January 2024, Lepaul joined Ligue 2 side Angers, for a fee of €150,000 and signed a contract until June 2027 with the club.

=== Rennes ===
On 28 August 2025, Lepaul signed a four-year contract with Rennes in Ligue 1. In the 2025–26 season, he scored 21 goals, (Note: 1 with Angers and 20 with Rennes) finishing as the top goalscorer in Ligue 1.

== International career ==
On 18 September 2026, Lepaul was called up to the France national team for the first time.

== Personal life ==
Lepaul's father Fabrice was also a professional footballer. Fabrice Lepaul died on 23 May 2020 in a car accident.

== Career statistics ==
=== Club ===
As of match played 18 October 2026

Appearances and goals by club, season and competition
Club	Season	League			Coupe de France		Europe		Total	
Club	Season	Division	Apps	Goals	Apps	Goals	Apps	Goals	Apps	Goals
Lyon B	2017–18	Championnat National 2	1	0	—		—		1	0
Lyon B	2018–19	Championnat National 2	3	1	—		—		3	1
Lyon B	2019–20	Championnat National 2	4	0	—		—		4	0
Lyon B	Total		8	1	—		—		8	1
Épinal	2020–21	Championnat National 2	8	5	0	0	—		8	5
Orléans B	2021–22	Championnat National 3	3	2	—		—		3	2
Orléans B	2022–23	Championnat National 3	10	11	—		—		10	11
Orléans B	Total		13	13	—		—		13	13
Orléans	2021–22	Championnat National	27	8	2	0	—		29	8
Orléans	2022–23	Championnat National	28	2	2	2	—		30	4
Orléans	Total		55	10	4	2	—		59	12
Épinal	2023–24	Championnat National	16	12	4	2	—		20	14
Angers	2023–24	Ligue 2	17	3	—		—		17	3
Angers	2024–25	Ligue 1	28	9	3	4	—		31	13
Angers	2025–26	Ligue 1	2	1	—		—		2	1
Angers	Total		47	13	3	4	—		50	17
Rennes	2025–26	Ligue 1	32	20	3	0	—		35	20
Rennes	2026–27	Ligue 1	7	7	0	0	2 (Note: Appearance in UEFA Europa League)	0	9	7
Rennes	Total		39	27	3	0	2	0	44	27
Career total			186	80	14	8	2	0	202	88

=== International ===
As of match played 5 October 2026

Appearances and goals by national team and year
National team	Year	Apps	Goals
France	2026	3	0
Total		3	0

== Honours ==
Individual

- Ligue 1 top goalscorer: 2025–26
- UNFP Ligue 1 Player of the Month: April 2026
