= Mohamed Kader Meïté =

Ivorian footballer (born 2007)

Personal information
- Date of birth: 11 October 2007 (age 19)
- Place of birth: Créteil, France
- Height: 1.92 m (6 ft 4 in)
- Position: Forward

Team information
- Current team: Al Hilal
- Number: 75

Youth career
- 2013–2018: CA Paris 14
- 2018–2020: Paris Alesia FC
- 2020–2021: US Villejuif
- 2021–2022: Montrouge FC 92
- 2022–2024: Rennes

Senior career*
Years	Team	Apps	(Gls)
2024	Rennes II	11	(4)
2024–2026	Rennes	29	(5)
2026–	Al Hilal	11	(2)

International career^{‡}
2023	France U16	2	(0)
2023–2024	France U17	9	(2)
2025	France U19	3	(0)
2025	France U21	3	(0)
2026–	Ivory Coast U23	1	(0)
- * Club domestic league appearances and goals as of 21:14, 31 October 2026 (UTC) ‡ National team caps and goals as of 17 November 2025

Mohamed Kader Meïté (born 11 October 2007) is a professional footballer who plays as a forward for Saudi Pro League club Al Hilal. Born in France, he is a youth international for the Ivory Coast.

== Career ==
Meïté is a youth product of the French clubs CA Paris 14, Paris Alesia FC, US Villejuif, Montrouge FC 92 and Rennes. In 2024, he debuted with the Rennes reserves in the Championnat National 3. On 5 November 2024, he signed his first professional contract with Rennes until 2028. He made his senior and professional debut with Rennes as a substitute in a 2–0 Ligue 1 loss to Toulouse on 10 November 2024.

On 1 February 2026, Meïté signed a three-and-a-half-year contract with Al Hilal in Saudi Arabia.

== International career ==
Born in France, Meïté is of Ivorian descent. He made the final squad for the France U17s at the 2024 UEFA European Under-17 Championship.

On 19 March 2026, it was announced that Meïté had chosen to represent Ivory Coast internationally. He was called up to the Ivory Coast U23s for a set of friendlies in March 2026.
