= Sebastian Szymański =

Polish footballer (born 1999)

Sebastian Szymanski
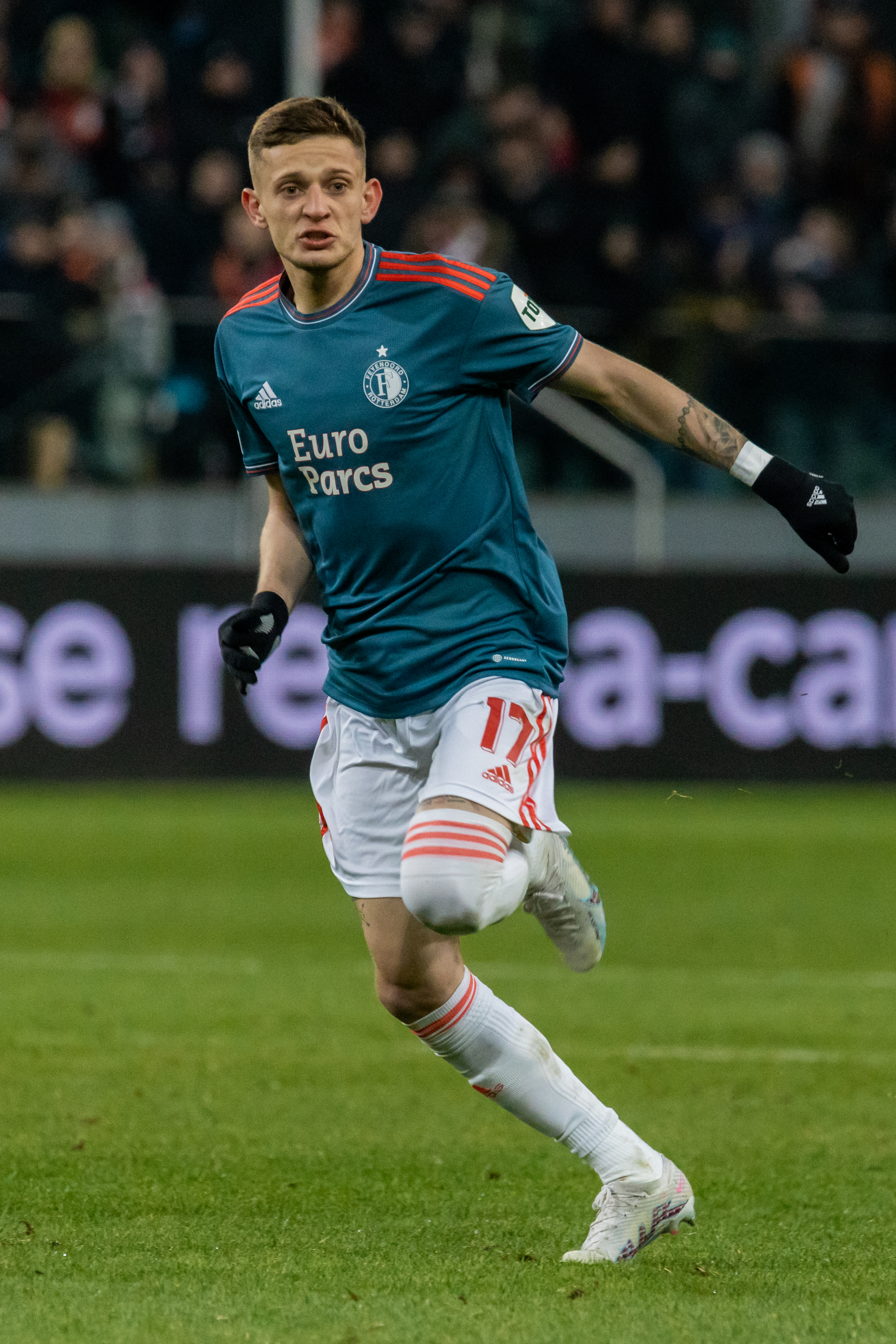
- Szymański playing for Feyenoord in 2023

Personal information
- Full name: Sebastian Szymański
- Date of birth: 10 May 1999 (age 27)
- Place of birth: Biała Podlaska, Poland
- Height: 1.74 m (5 ft 9 in)
- Positions: Attacking midfielder; winger

Team information
- Current team: Rennes
- Number: 17

Youth career
- 2005–2013: TOP 54 Biała Podlaska
- 2013–2015: Legia Warsaw

Senior career*
Years	Team	Apps	(Gls)
2015–2017	Legia Warsaw II	23	(5)
2016–2019	Legia Warsaw	65	(7)
2019–2023	Dynamo Moscow	77	(8)
2022–2023	→ Feyenoord (loan)	29	(9)
2023–2026	Fenerbahçe	86	(14)
2026–	Rennes	25	(5)

International career^{‡}
2014–2015	Poland U16	9	(1)
2015–2016	Poland U17	10	(2)
2016	Poland U18	2	(1)
2016–2017	Poland U19	9	(0)
2017–2019	Poland U21	16	(3)
2019–	Poland	60	(7)
- * Club domestic league appearances and goals as of 23:04, 22 November 2026 (UTC) ‡ National team caps and goals as of 17 November 2026

Sebastian Szymański (born 10 May 1999) is a Polish professional footballer who plays as an attacking midfielder or a winger for French Ligue 1 club Rennes and the Poland national team.

== Club career ==
=== Early career ===
Szymański started training at the age of six at TOP 54 Biała Podlaska. In March 2013, he became a player of Legia Warsaw. In the 2015–16 season, he appeared in 12 matches and scored once for Legia's reserve team. He also played in one UEFA Youth League match and three matches of the Central Junior League, which Legia won after beating Pogoń Szczecin 5–4 on aggregate in a two-legged final, with Szymanski scoring twice in the second leg.

=== Legia Warsaw ===
In July 2016, Szymański was promoted to the first team and debuted on the seventh day in a 1–4 loss to Lech Poznań in the Polish Super Cup final. He made his Ekstraklasa debut on 20 August 2016 in a 1–3 loss to Arka Gdynia. In November 2016, he extended his contract with Legia until the end of June 2019. On 3 March 2017, in a 3–1 win over Zagłębie Lubin, he scored his first goal for Legia's first team. In the 2016–17 season, he won the Ekstraklasa title with the club, and was the youngest player to score a league goal that season. He also appeared in nine matches of the third-league reserves, scoring two goals, and five matches of the UEFA Youth League, in which he scored twice. In October 2017, he extended his contract with the club until 2022. In the 2017–18 campaign, he won the Polish Cup with Legia.

=== Dynamo Moscow ===
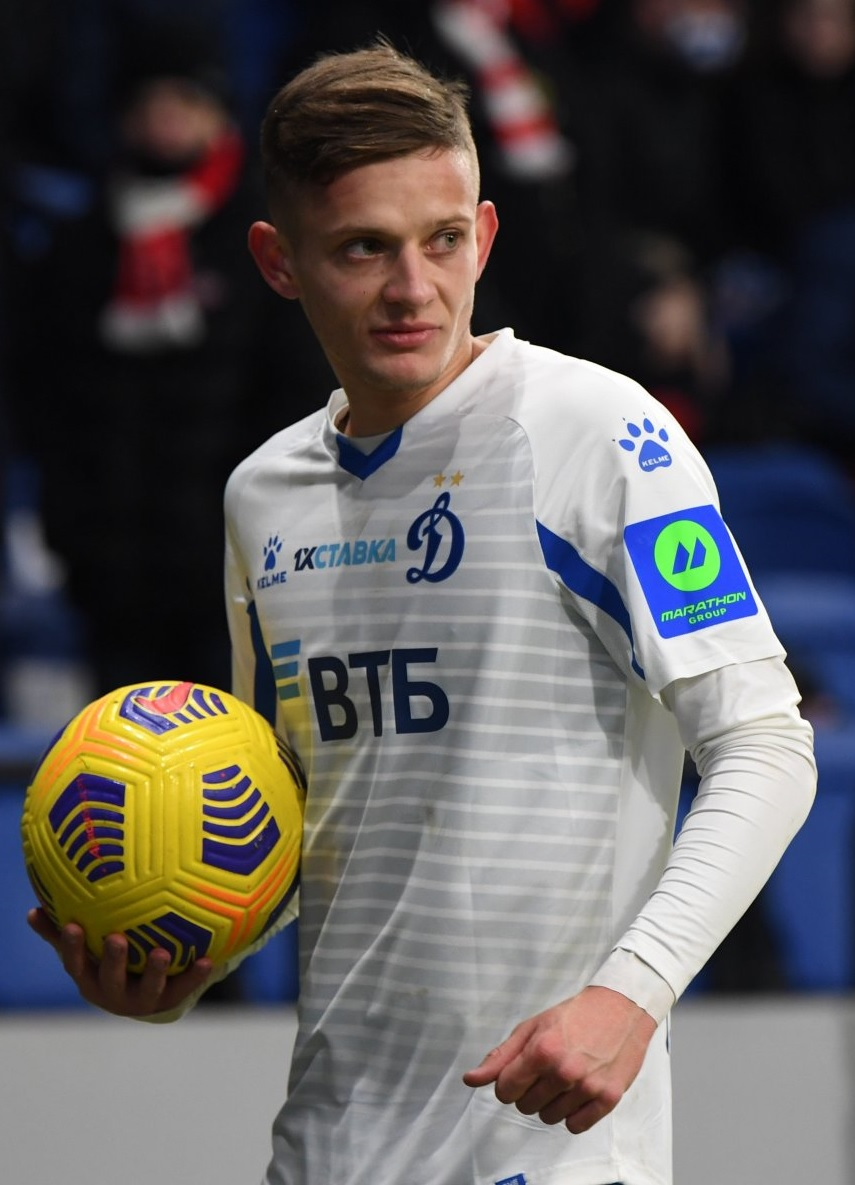
Szymański with Dynamo Moscow in 2021

On 31 May 2019, Szymański signed a five-year contract with the Russian Premier League club Dynamo Moscow.

Szymański was voted by Dynamo fans as "player of the month" for October 2019. On 9 November 2019, he scored his first goal for Dynamo, the only goal of the game in a 1–0 victory over FC Rubin Kazan. It was the first Dynamo away victory against Rubin in 13 years.

On 2 June 2021, he signed a new contract with Dynamo for a five-year term. He was voted player of the month by Dynamo fans for July 2021, August 2021 and November 2021.

==== Feyenoord (loan) ====
On 22 July 2022, Szymański joined Dutch club Feyenoord on a one-year loan with an option to buy for the club.

On 7 August 2022, he made his Eredivisie debut with Feyenoord against Vitesse and made two assists of 2–5 away win. He scored his first goal for the club on 27 August 2022, scoring the fourth goal in the club's 4–0 win over FC Emmen.

=== Fenerbahçe ===
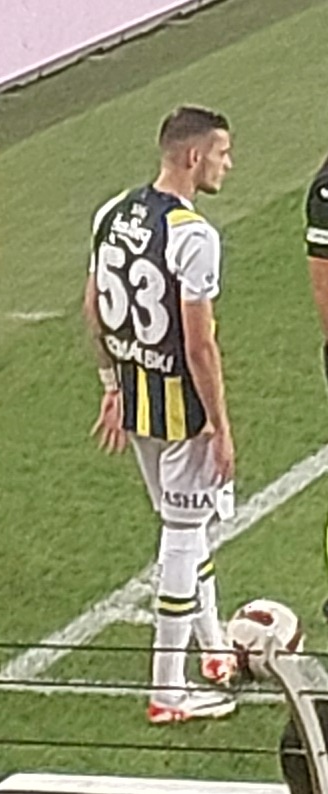
Szymański taking a corner kick for Fenerbahçe in 2023

On 12 July 2023, Turkish Süper Lig side Fenerbahçe announced the signing of Szymański on a four-year contract, for €9.75 million. On 26 July 2023, he scored his first goal in his debut in UEFA Conference League against Zimbru at the Şükrü Saracoğlu Stadium, Fenerbahçe won 5–0. On 13 August 2023, he made his Süper Lig debut against Gaziantep FK at the Şükrü Saracoğlu Stadium, Fenerbahçe won 2–1. He made his Turkish Cup debut on 7 February 2024, against Gaziantep FK at the Gaziantep Stadium, Fenerbahçe won 2–0. On 9 February 2025, against Alanyaspor, he scored 4000th goal of the team in Süper Lig history.

On 13 March 2025, he scored double in 2024–25 UEFA Europa League knockout phase against Glasgow Rangers at the Ibrox Stadium, Fenerbahçe won 2–0.

On 6 April 2025, he made his 100th appearance (and scored 20 goals in his first 100 matches) in all competitions for Fenerbahçe against Trabzonspor in a 4–1 Süper Lig home win.

=== Rennes ===
On 22 January 2026, Szymański signed a three-and-a-half-year contract with Rennes in French Ligue 1.

== International career ==
In May 2018, Szymański was named in Poland's preliminary 35-man squad for the 2018 World Cup, but did not make the final 23.

On 9 September 2019, Szymański debuted for the senior Polish squad by replacing Kamil Grosicki in the 70th minute during a UEFA Euro 2020 qualifying match against Austria. He started for the first time in the same qualification on 10 October against Latvia and assisted on one of the goals, resulting in a 3–0 victory for Poland that secured their final tournament spot. Szymański scored his first goal for his country on 19 November 2019 in the last qualifying group game against Slovenia. On 15 October 2024, he scored a goal in a 3–3 draw against Croatia in the group stage of the UEFA Nations League.

== Career statistics ==
=== Club ===
As of match played 22 November 2026

Appearances and goals by club, season and competition
Club	Season	League			National cup (Note: Includes Polish Cup, Russian Cup, KNVB Cup, Turkish Cup, Coupe de France)		Europe		Other		Total	
Club	Season	Division	Apps	Goals	Apps	Goals	Apps	Goals	Apps	Goals	Apps	Goals
Legia Warsaw II	2015–16	III liga, group A	12	1	—		—		—		12	1
Legia Warsaw II	2016–17	III liga, group I	9	2	—		—		—		9	2
Legia Warsaw II	2017–18	III liga, group I	2	2	—		—		—		2	2
Legia Warsaw II	Total		23	5	—		—		—		23	5
Legia Warsaw	2016–17	Ekstraklasa	10	1	0	0	0	0	1 (Note: Appearance in Polish Super Cup)	0	11	1
Legia Warsaw	2017–18	Ekstraklasa	21	4	6	3	5 (Note: Three appearances and one goal in UEFA Champions League, two appearances in UEFA Europa League)	1	1	0	33	8
Legia Warsaw	2018–19	Ekstraklasa	34	2	3	0	4 (Note: Two appearances in UEFA Champions League, two appearances in UEFA Europa League)	0	1	0	42	2
Legia Warsaw	Total		65	7	9	3	9	1	3	0	86	11
Dynamo Moscow	2019–20	Russian Premier League	22	1	1	0	—		—		23	1
Dynamo Moscow	2020–21	Russian Premier League	28	1	2	0	1 (Note: Appearance(s) in UEFA Europa League)	0	—		31	1
Dynamo Moscow	2021–22	Russian Premier League	27	6	5	0	—		—		32	6
Dynamo Moscow	Total		77	8	8	0	1	0	—		86	8
Feyenoord (loan)	2022–23	Eredivisie	29	9	2	0	9	1	—		40	10
Fenerbahçe	2023–24	Süper Lig	37	10	2	0	16 (Note: Appearances in UEFA Europa Conference League)	3	0	0	55	13
Fenerbahçe	2024–25	Süper Lig	35	3	2	1	16 (Note: Four appearances and one goal in UEFA Champions League, twelve appearances and two goals in UEFA Europa League)	3	—		53	7
Fenerbahçe	2025–26	Süper Lig	14	1	2	0	9 (Note: Four appearances in UEFA Champions League, five appearances and one goal in UEFA Europa League)	1	1 (Note: Appearance in Turkish Super Cup)	0	26	2
Fenerbahçe	Total		86	14	6	1	41	7	1	0	134	22
Rennes	2025–26	Ligue 1	16	1	1	0	—		—		17	1
Rennes	2026–27	Ligue 1	9	4	0	0	4	0	—		13	4
Rennes	Total		25	5	1	0	4	0	—		30	5
Career total			305	48	26	4	64	9	4	0	399	61

=== International ===
As of match played 17 November 2026

Appearances and goals by national team and year
National team	Year	Apps	Goals
Poland	2019	5	1
Poland	2020	5	0
Poland	2021	1	0
Poland	2022	9	0
Poland	2023	10	1
Poland	2024	11	3
Poland	2025	9	1
Poland	2026	10	1
Total		60	7

Scores and results list Poland's goal tally first, score column indicates score after each Szymański goal.

List of international goals scored by Sebastian Szymański
No.	Date	Venue	Opponent	Score	Result	Competition
1	19 November 2019	Stadion Narodowy, Warsaw, Poland	Slovenia	1–0	3–2	UEFA Euro 2020 qualifying
2	12 October 2023	Tórsvøllur, Tórshavn, Faroe Islands	Faroe Islands	1–0	2–0	UEFA Euro 2024 qualifying
3	21 March 2024	Stadion Narodowy, Warsaw, Poland	Estonia	5–0	5–1	UEFA Euro 2024 qualifying
4	5 September 2024	Hampden Park, Glasgow, Scotland	Scotland	1–0	3–2	2024–25 UEFA Nations League A
5	15 October 2024	Stadion Narodowy, Warsaw, Poland	Croatia	3–3	3–3	2024–25 UEFA Nations League A
6	12 October 2025	Darius and Girėnas Stadium, Kaunas, Lithuania	Lithuania	1–0	2–0	2026 FIFA World Cup qualification
7	28 September 2026	Strawberry Arena, Solna, Sweden	Sweden	1–1	1–3	2026–27 UEFA Nations League B

== Honours ==
Legia Warsaw

- Ekstraklasa: 2016–17, 2017–18
- Polish Cup: 2017–18

Feyenoord

- Eredivisie: 2022–23

Fenerbahçe

- Turkish Super Cup: 2025

Individual

- Ekstraklasa Young Player of the Month: April 2019
- Eredivisie Team of the Month: November 2022
