= Brice Samba =

Congolese-French Footballer (born 1994)

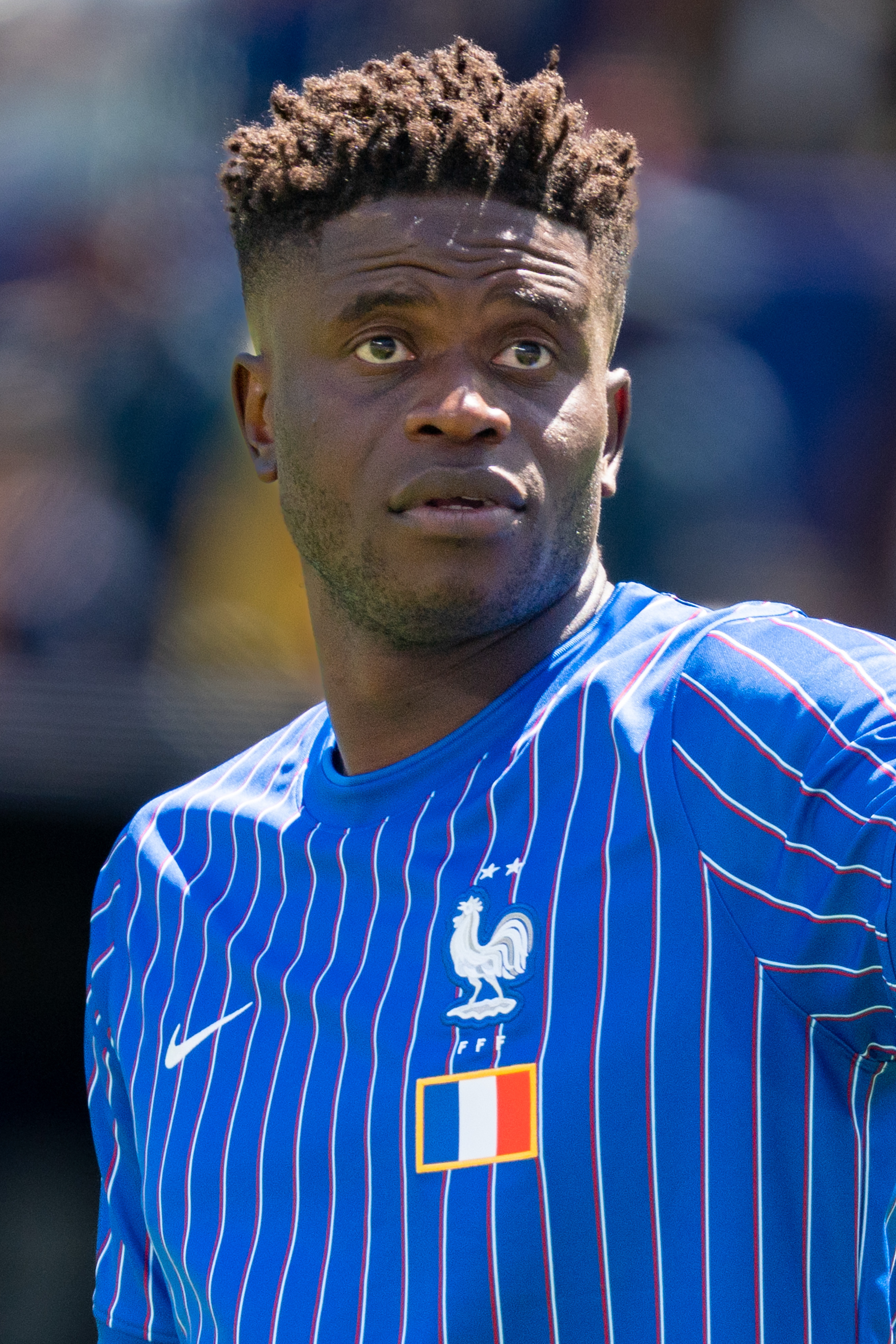
- Samba with France in 2026

Personal information
- Full name: Brice Lauriche Samba
- Date of birth: 25 April 1994 (age 32)
- Place of birth: Linzolo, Republic of the Congo
- Height: 1.87 m (6 ft 2 in)
- Position: Goalkeeper

Team information
- Current team: Rennes
- Number: 30

Youth career
- 2001–2002: Pacy Vallée-d'Eure
- 2002–2006: Madeleine Evreux
- 2006–2011: Le Havre

Senior career*
Years	Team	Apps	(Gls)
2011–2013	Le Havre B	27	(0)
2011–2013	Le Havre	0	(0)
2013–2017	Marseille B	9	(0)
2013–2017	Marseille	1	(0)
2015–2016	→ Nancy B (loan)	2	(0)
2015–2016	→ Nancy (loan)	2	(0)
2017–2018	Caen B	3	(0)
2017–2019	Caen	43	(0)
2019–2022	Nottingham Forest	125	(0)
2022–2025	Lens	85	(0)
2025–	Rennes	57	(0)

International career^{‡}
2023–	France	4	(0)
Medal record
Men's football
Representing France
UEFA Nations League
Third place	2025 Germany	Team
- * Club domestic league appearances and goals as of 8 November 2026 ‡ National team caps and goals as of 29 March 2026

Brice Lauriche Samba (born 25 April 1994) is a professional footballer who plays as a goalkeeper for Ligue 1 club Rennes. Born in the Republic of the Congo, he plays for the France national team.

== Club career ==
=== Le Havre ===
Samba joined Le Havre in 2006, working his way through their youth teams before appearing in the first-team in 2011.

=== Marseille ===
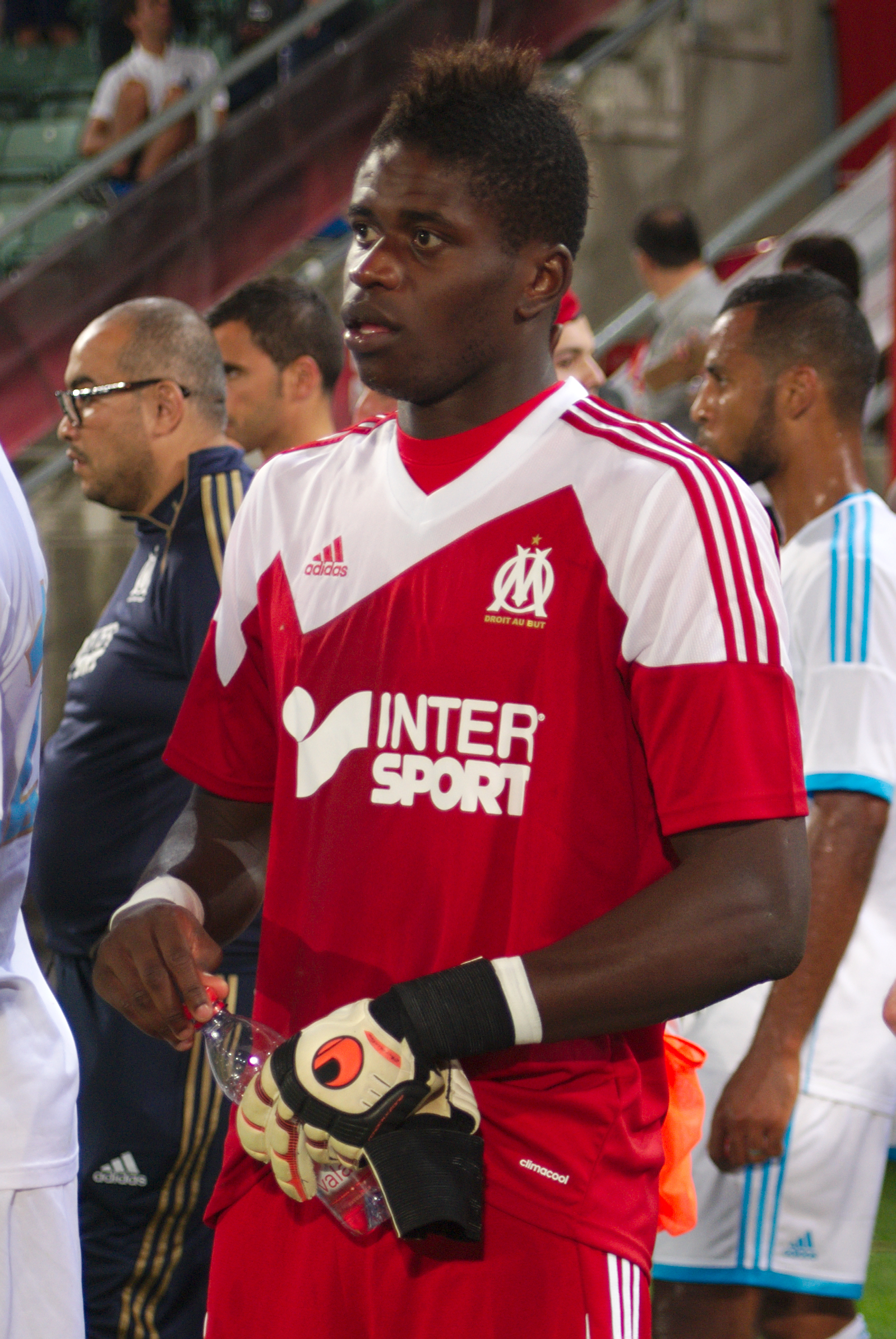
Samba with Marseille in 2013

On 4 January 2013, Samba joined Marseille from Le Havre, signing a four-and-a-half-year contract. He made his professional debut for Marseille on 5 January 2014 in a Coupe de France game against Reims keeping a clean sheet in a 2–0 home win. On 9 July 2015, Samba joined Nancy on a season-long loan.

=== Caen ===
Samba joined Caen on a four-year deal from Marseille on 30 June 2017.

=== Nottingham Forest ===
On 7 August 2019, Samba joined EFL Championship side Nottingham Forest on a four-year deal for an undisclosed fee. He was initially brought in as a backup for on loan goalkeeper Arijanet Muric, but earned his place as Forest's number one after Muric made a number of costly mistakes.

Samba made his debut for Forest on 13 August 2019 in a 1–0 EFL Cup victory over Fleetwood Town. His league debut came on 24 August 2019 in a 2–1 win against Fulham. His impressive performances led him being named the Championship Fans' Player of the Month for November 2019. On 8 September 2020, Samba was included in the PFA Championship Team of the Year for the 2019–20 season.

In the 2022 Championship play-off semi-final, Samba saved three penalties to send Forest through to the final against Huddersfield Town. He subsequently started in the 2022 EFL Championship play-off final before being substituted for Ethan Horvath in the 90th minute with a groin injury as Forest held on to a 1–0 lead to confirm their return to the Premier League for first time in 23 years.

=== Lens ===
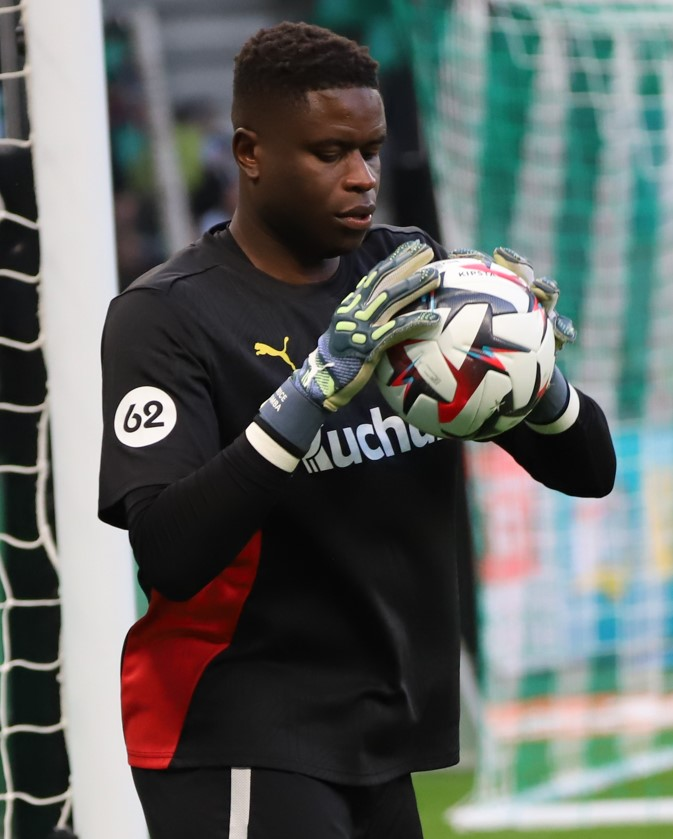
Samba with Lens in 2024

On 5 July 2022, it was announced that Samba had signed a five-year contract with Ligue 1 club Lens for an undisclosed fee. In the first half of the 2022–23 Ligue 1 season, he had 9 clean sheets out of 19 games. He ended the season with 15 clean sheets out of 38 league matches, the highest in the season and was awarded the Ligue 1 Goalkeeper of the Year whilst being named in the UNFP Ligue 1 Team of the Year. He conceded the least goals (29 goals) in the league helping Lens to place second with 84 points, one point behind league winners Paris Saint-Germain and secure a champions league spot for the first time in 20 years since 2002–03 season and the third time in the club's history.

== International career ==
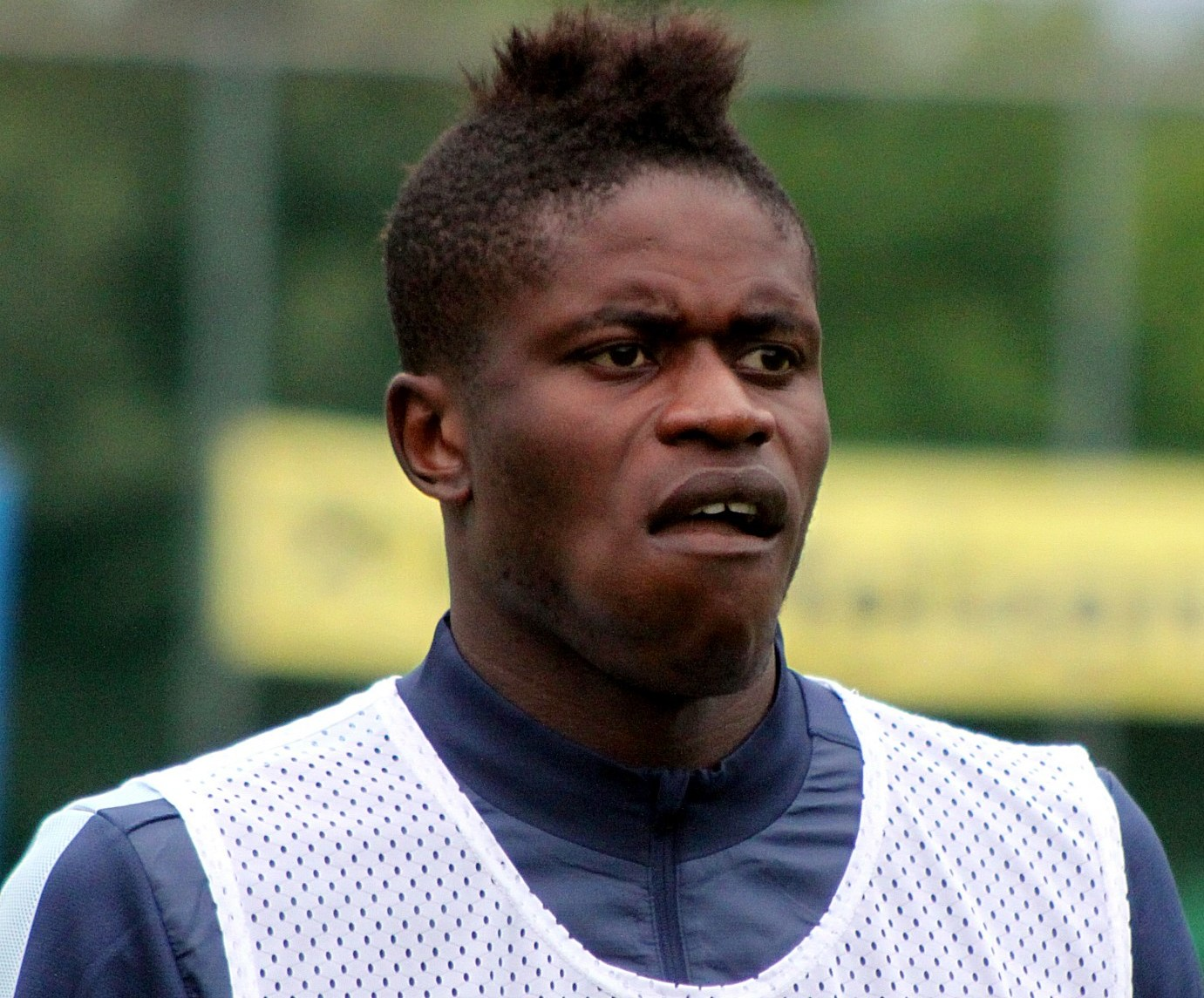
Samba with France U19 in 2013

Born in the Republic of the Congo, Samba holds both Congolese and French nationalities.

In March 2023, he received his first call-up to the France senior national team for the UEFA Euro 2024 qualifying matches against the Netherlands and the Republic of Ireland.

On 16 June 2023, he made his debut playing the whole game in a UEFA Euro 2024 qualifying match against Gibraltar.

On 11 May 2026, he was named in the France squad for the 2026 FIFA World Cup.

== Career statistics ==
=== Club ===
As of match played 8 November 2026

Appearances and goals by club, season and competition
Club	Season	League			National cup (Note: Includes Coupe de France, FA Cup)		League cup (Note: Includes Coupe de la Ligue, EFL Cup)		Europe		Other		Total	
Club	Season	Division	Apps	Goals	Apps	Goals	Apps	Goals	Apps	Goals	Apps	Goals	Apps	Goals
Le Havre B	2010–11	CFA	1	0	—		—		—		—		1	0
Le Havre B	2011–12	CFA	17	0	—		—		—		—		17	0
Le Havre B	2012–13	CFA	9	0	—		—		—		—		9	0
Le Havre B	Total		27	0	—		—		—		—		27	0
Le Havre	2012–13	Ligue 2	0	0	1	0	0	0	—		—		1	0
Marseille B	2012–13	CFA 2	1	0	—		—		—		—		1	0
Marseille B	2013–14	CFA 2	3	0	—		—		—		—		3	0
Marseille B	2014–15	CFA 2	4	0	—		—		—		—		4	0
Marseille B	2016–17	CFA	1	0	—		—		—		—		1	0
Marseille B	Total		9	0	—		—		—		—		9	0
Marseille	2012–13	Ligue 1	0	0	0	0	0	0	0	0	—		0	0
Marseille	2013–14	Ligue 1	1	0	1	0	0	0	0	0	—		2	0
Marseille	2014–15	Ligue 1	0	0	1	0	1	0	—		—		2	0
Marseille	2016–17	Ligue 1	0	0	0	0	0	0	—		—		0	0
Marseille	Total		1	0	2	0	1	0	0	0	—		4	0
Nancy B (loan)	2015–16	CFA 2	2	0	—		—		—		—		2	0
Nancy (loan)	2015–16	Ligue 2	2	0	1	0	2	0	—		—		5	0
Caen B	2017–18	Championnat National 3	3	0	—		—		—		—		3	0
Caen	2017–18	Ligue 1	4	0	4	0	2	0	—		—		10	0
Caen	2018–19	Ligue 1	38	0	0	0	0	0	—		—		38	0
Caen	2019–20	Ligue 2	1	0	—		—		—		—		1	0
Caen	Total		43	0	4	0	2	0	—		—		49	0
Nottingham Forest	2019–20	Championship	40	0	0	0	2	0	—		—		42	0
Nottingham Forest	2020–21	Championship	45	0	0	0	1	0	—		—		46	0
Nottingham Forest	2021–22	Championship	40	0	2	0	1	0	—		3 (Note: Appearances in Championship play-offs)	0	46	0
Nottingham Forest	Total		125	0	2	0	4	0	—		3	0	134	0
Lens	2022–23	Ligue 1	37	0	0	0	—		—		—		37	0
Lens	2023–24	Ligue 1	33	0	1	0	—		8 (Note: Six appearances in UEFA Champions League, two appearances in UEFA Europa League)	0	—		42	0
Lens	2024–25	Ligue 1	15	0	0	0	—		2 (Note: Appearances in UEFA Conference League)	0	—		17	0
Lens	Total		85	0	1	0	—		10	0	—		96	0
Rennes	2024–25	Ligue 1	17	0	1	0	—		—		—		18	0
Rennes	2025–26	Ligue 1	32	0	2	0	—		—		—		34	0
Rennes	2026–27	Ligue 1	8	0	0	0	—		4 (Note: Appearances in UEFA Europa League)	0	—		12	0
Rennes	Total		57	0	3	0	—		4	0	—		64	0
Career total			353	0	14	0	9	0	14	0	3	0	393	0

=== International ===
As of match played 29 March 2026

Appearances and goals by national team and year
National team	Year	Apps	Goals
France	2023	2	0
France	2024	1	0
France	2026	1	0
Total		4	0

== Honours ==
Nottingham Forest

- EFL Championship play-offs: 2022

France

- UEFA Nations League third place: 2024–25

Individual

- PFA Championship Fans Player of the Month: November 2019
- PFA Team of the Year: 2019–20 EFL Championship
- Ligue 1 Goalkeeper of the Year: 2022–23
- UNFP Ligue 1 Team of the Year: 2022–23
