= Przemysław Frankowski =

Polish footballer (born 1995)

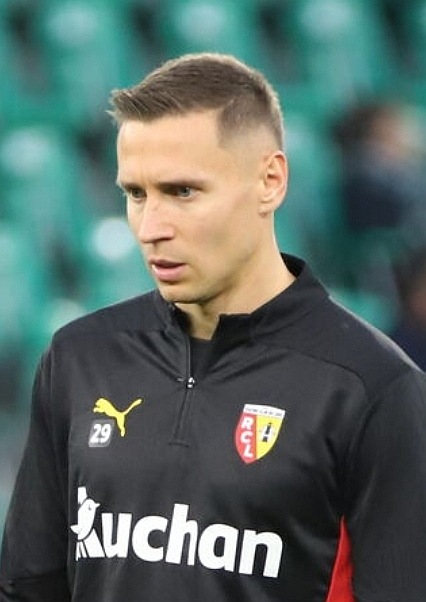
- Frankowski with Lens in 2024

Personal information
- Full name: Przemysław Adam Frankowski
- Date of birth: 12 April 1995 (age 31)
- Place of birth: Gdańsk, Poland
- Height: 1.75 m (5 ft 9 in)
- Position: Wing-back

Team information
- Current team: Rennes (on loan from Galatasaray)
- Number: 95

Youth career
- 2008–2012: Lechia Gdańsk

Senior career*
Years	Team	Apps	(Gls)
2012–2014	Lechia Gdańsk	41	(2)
2014–2019	Jagiellonia Białystok	140	(24)
2019–2021	Chicago Fire	63	(10)
2021–2025	Lens	122	(18)
2025	→ Galatasaray (loan)	12	(0)
2025–	Galatasaray	0	(0)
2025–	→ Rennes (loan)	28	(2)

International career^{‡}
2011	Poland U16	1	(0)
2013	Poland U18	1	(0)
2013	Poland U19	6	(1)
2015	Poland U20	5	(2)
2015–2017	Poland U21	12	(0)
2018–	Poland	55	(3)
- * Club domestic league appearances and goals as of 13:40, 10 November 2026 (UTC) ‡ National team caps and goals as of 16:10, 6 October 2026 (UTC)

Przemysław Adam Frankowski (born 12 April 1995) is a Polish professional footballer who plays as a wing-back for Ligue 1 club Rennes, on loan from Süper Lig club Galatasaray, and the Poland national team.

== Club career ==
=== Jagiellonia Białystok ===
On 1 August 2014, Frankowski signed a three-year contract with Jagiellonia Białystok.

Frankowski made his Europa League debut on 9 July 2015 in an 8–0 win against Kruoja Pakruojis being substituted in the 62 min. for Piotr Grzelczak. He scored a hat-trick scoring goals in the 64th, 75th and 80th minutes. He also made appearances against Omonia Nicosia.

=== Chicago Fire ===
On 22 January 2019, Frankowski moved to Major League Soccer side Chicago Fire. he debuted for Chicago Fire in a 2–1 loss against LA Galaxy on 3 March 2019. The following week, on 9 March 2019, he got his first assist for the club after crossing the ball into the box, which led to C. J. Sapong scoring a goal and tying up the game in stoppage time. Frankowski's first goal for the Fire came on 8 May 2019 when he scored the fifth goal of the night in the 89th minute in a 5–0 win against New England Revolution.

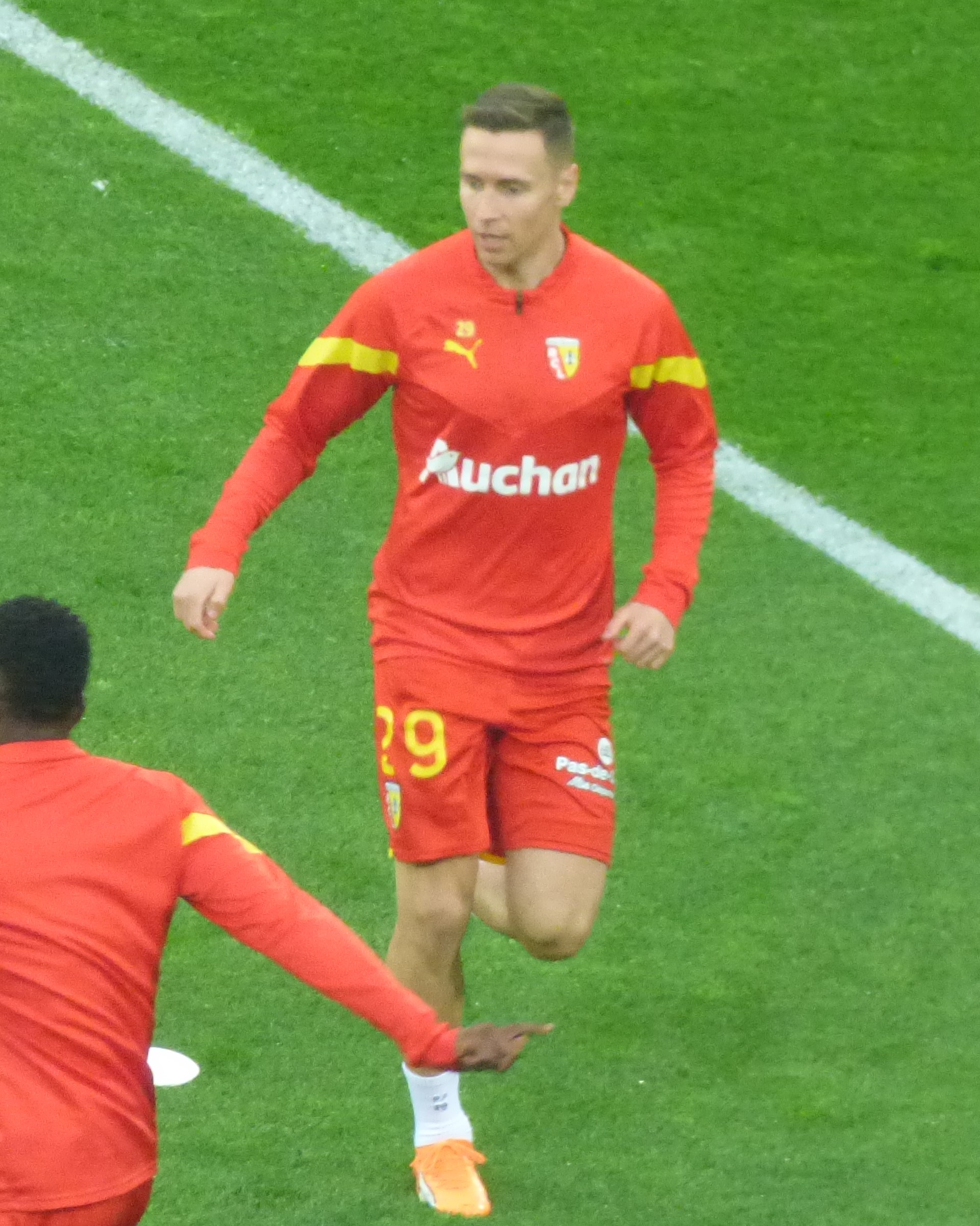
Frankowski with Lens in 2023 during training

=== Lens ===
On 5 August 2021, Frankowski signed for Ligue 1 club Lens for a reported €2.3 million.

=== Galatasaray ===
On 10 February 2025, Turkish Süper Lig club Galatasaray opened talks to sign Frankowski on loan until the end of the 2024–25 season. Finalised later that day, the deal included an option to buy for €7 million. On 1 July, he signed a three-year contract with the club.

==== Rennes (loan) ====
On 3 August 2025, Galatasaray announced they have entered negotiations with Ligue 1 club Rennes regarding Frankowski's transfer. The move was completed on 5 August, with Frankowski joining the French side on a season-long loan, with a one-year extension option.

== International career ==
Frankowski debuted for the Polish senior squad in a 0–1 friendly loss against Nigeria. He was subbed out in the 81st minute. In May 2018, he was named in Poland's preliminary 35-man squad for the 2018 FIFA World Cup in Russia. However, he did not make the final roster.

== Career statistics ==
=== Club ===
As of match played 30 October 2026

Appearances and goals by club, season and competition
Club	Season	League			National cup (Note: Includes Polish Cup, Coupe de France, Turkish Cup)		Continental		Total	
Club	Season	Division	Apps	Goals	Apps	Goals	Apps	Goals	Apps	Goals
Lechia Gdańsk	2012–13	Ekstraklasa	8	1	0	0	—		8	1
Lechia Gdańsk	2013–14	Ekstraklasa	33	1	3	1	—		36	2
Lechia Gdańsk	Total		41	2	3	1	0	0	44	3
Jagiellonia Białystok	2014–15	Ekstraklasa	28	3	2	0	—		30	3
Jagiellonia Białystok	2015–16	Ekstraklasa	31	6	2	1	3 (Note: Appearance(s) in UEFA Europa League)	3	36	10
Jagiellonia Białystok	2016–17	Ekstraklasa	35	8	1	0	—		36	8
Jagiellonia Białystok	2017–18	Ekstraklasa	31	4	0	0	0	0	31	4
Jagiellonia Białystok	2018–19	Ekstraklasa	15	3	3	0	4	0	22	2
Jagiellonia Białystok	Total		140	24	6	1	7	3	153	28
Chicago Fire	2019	Major League Soccer	31	5	0	0	1 (Note: Appearance in Leagues Cup)	0	32	5
Chicago Fire	2020	Major League Soccer	19 (Note: Includes three appearances in MLS is Back Tournament group stage)	3	—		—		19	3
Chicago Fire	2021	Major League Soccer	13	2	—		—		13	2
Chicago Fire	Total		63	10	0	0	1	0	64	10
Lens	2021–22	Ligue 1	37	6	3	0	—		40	6
Lens	2022–23	Ligue 1	37	5	4	0	—		41	5
Lens	2023–24	Ligue 1	30	3	1	0	8 (Note: Six appearances and one goal in UEFA Champions League, two appearances in UEFA Europa League)	1	39	4
Lens	2024–25	Ligue 1	18	4	1	0	2 (Note: Appearances in UEFA Conference League)	1	21	5
Lens	Total		122	18	9	0	10	2	141	20
Galatasaray (loan)	2024–25	Süper Lig	12	0	3	0	—		15	0
Rennes (loan)	2025–26	Ligue 1	19	1	0	0	—		19	1
Rennes (loan)	2026–27	Ligue 1	9	1	0	0	1	0	10	1
Rennes (loan)	Total		28	2	0	0	1	0	29	2
Career total			406	56	21	2	19	5	446	63

=== International ===
As of match played 5 October 2026

Appearances and goals by national team and year
National team	Year	Apps	Goals
Poland	2018	4	0
Poland	2019	6	1
Poland	2021	12	0
Poland	2022	8	0
Poland	2023	8	1
Poland	2024	9	1
Poland	2025	4	0
Poland	2026	4	0
Total		55	3

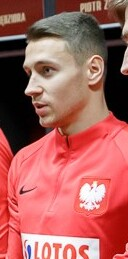
Frankowski with Poland in 2019

As of match played 21 March 2024
Scores and results list Poland's goal tally first, score column indicates score after each Frankowski goal.

List of international goals scored by Przemysław Frankowski
No.	Date	Venue	Opponent	Score	Result	Competition
1	13 October 2019	National Stadium, Warsaw, Poland	North Macedonia	1–0	2–0	UEFA Euro 2020 qualifying
2	21 November 2023	National Stadium, Warsaw, Poland	Latvia	1–0	2–0	Friendly
3	21 March 2024	National Stadium, Warsaw, Poland	Estonia	1–0	5–1	UEFA Euro 2024 qualifying

== Honours ==
Galatasaray

- Süper Lig: 2024–25
- Turkish Cup: 2024–25

Individual

- Ekstraklasa Player of the Month: September 2016
