= Jordan James (footballer, born 2004) =

Wales international footballer (born 2004)

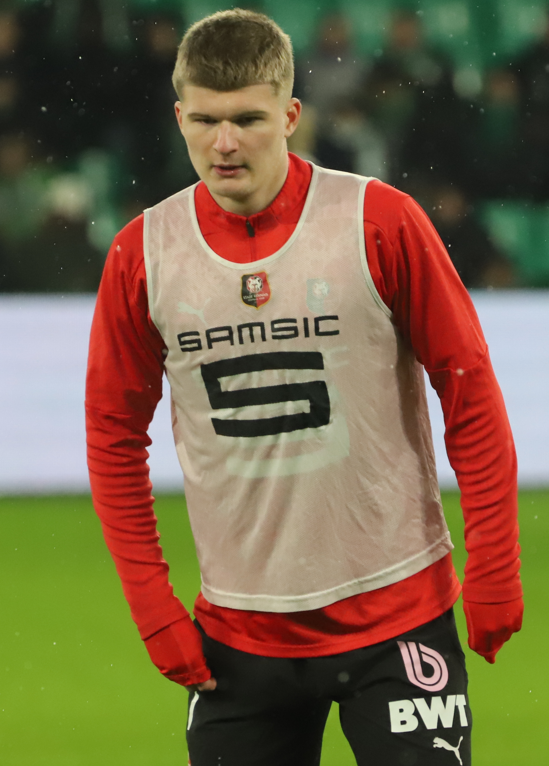
- James with Rennes in 2025

Personal information
- Full name: Jordan Anthony James
- Date of birth: 2 July 2004 (age 22)
- Place of birth: Hereford, England
- Height: 6 ft 0 in (1.83 m)
- Position: Midfielder

Team information
- Current team: Wolverhampton Wanderers (on loan from Rennes)
- Number: 8

Youth career
- 2012–2021: Birmingham City

Senior career*
Years	Team	Apps	(Gls)
2021–2024	Birmingham City	95	(9)
2024–	Rennes	23	(0)
2025–2026	→ Leicester City (loan)	34	(11)
2026–	→ Wolverhampton Wanderers (loan)	9	(2)

International career^{‡}
- Wales U15
- Wales U16
2021	Wales U18	1	(0)
2022	England U20	2	(0)
2023–	Wales	30	(1)
- * Club domestic league appearances and goals as of 00:12, 21 October 2026 (UTC) ‡ National team caps and goals as of 22:22, 4 October 2026 (UTC)

Jordan Anthony James (born 2 July 2004) is a professional footballer who plays as a midfielder for EFL Championship club Wolverhampton Wanderers, on loan from Ligue 1 club Rennes, and the Wales national team.

James made his senior debut for Birmingham City as a 17-year-old on 2 November 2021, and went on to make 105 appearances in all competitions before signing for Rennes in 2024. Born in England to a Welsh father, James represented both Wales and England at youth levels. He made his senior international debut for Wales in March 2023.

== Early life ==
James was born in Hereford, where he attended Whitecross Hereford High School. His father, Tony James, played in the Football League as a defender for Burton Albion, Newport County and Hereford United. James joined Birmingham City at pre-Academy level and took up a two-year scholarship in July 2020. According to the then head of professional development phase Mike Dodds, James was "technically very good and versatile, [and] can play in both offensive and defensive areas of the pitch." Dodds also highlighted the commitment shown by James and his family in making a round trip of more than 100 miles (160 km) from their Hereford home for training in Birmingham three times a week for nine years.

== Club career ==
=== Birmingham City ===
James was a member of the Birmingham under-18 team that finished as runners-up in the Northern Section of their league, and came from behind against Charlton Athletic's U18 in the national semi-finals only to lose to a last-minute goal. As well as playing for the under-18s, he started several matches for Birmingham's under-23 team in the 2021–22 Premier League 2. He trained occasionally with the first team, and was given a squad number and named in the matchday squad for the EFL Championship match at home to Bristol City on 2 November. With only a few minutes left, Birmingham led 3–0, and the 17-year-old James came on in place of Jordan Graham to make his senior debut. Manager Lee Bowyer said "He came on today, ran around, didn't give the ball away, competed and when he passed, he passed it with a purpose."

With both Ryan Woods and Gary Gardner suspended, James made his first start against Blackpool on 27 November, partnering Ivan Šunjić in central midfield in a 3–4–1–2 formation. He played the whole game, headed Kristian Pedersen's cross into the path of Lukas Jutkiewicz who scored the 81st-minute winner, and was the Birmingham Mail's man of the match. On the same day, James signed his first professional contract.

=== Rennes ===
On 12 August 2024, James signed for Ligue 1 club Rennes on a four-year deal for an undisclosed fee, reported by BBC Sport to be £4 million. An unused substitute in the first week of the Ligue 1 season, he made his debut in the second, as a second-half substitute as Rennes lost 3–1 away to Strasbourg.

==== Loan to Leicester City ====
On 1 September 2025, James joined EFL Championship club Leicester City on loan, with a €10 million option to buy. James was selected as Leicester City player of the season for the 2025–26 season.

== International career ==
James was eligible to represent both England, where he was born, and his father's native country of Wales. He came through the 2018 Cymru Cup, a training and pre-selection camp for 14-year-olds, to make his under-15 debut for Wales during the 2018–19 season. He played for Wales U16 in 2019–20, attended under-17 training camps in 2020–21, and made his under-18s debut against England in September 2021.

James was called up to the England under-20 squad for matches against Poland and Germany in March 2022, and appeared in both games as a very late substitute.

James was named in a 26-man initial squad for Wales under-21's friendly against Austria in September 2022. However, following an injury to Joe Allen, James was instead added to the senior Wales squad for the Nations League matches against Belgium and Poland. He did not play, but he and fellow uncapped player Oli Cooper were named to travel as backup to the senior Wales squad at the 2022 World Cup in Qatar in November.

On 25 March 2023, aged 18, James made his senior international debut for Wales in stoppage time of a Euro 2024 qualifier away to Croatia, with the hosts leading 1–0. A minute later, fellow debutant Nathan Broadhead equalised. He made his first start for Wales in a friendly against South Korea on 7 September 2023 which finished goalless, and in the absence of the suspended Joe Morrell, made his first competitive start four days later in a Euro 2024 qualifier away to Latvia. Wales won 2–0, and according to WalesOnline, James partnered Ethan Ampadu in "an impressive deep midfield duo"; he was "so composed and mature on the ball, spreading play excellently and winning fouls to take the sting out of the game when needed." James scored his first goal for Wales on 15 November 2025 in their 1–0 win against Liechtenstein in a 2026 World Cup qualifier.

== Career statistics ==
=== Club ===
As of match played 20 October 2026

Appearances and goals by club, season and competition
Club	Season	League			National cup (Note: Includes FA Cup, Coupe de France)		League cup (Note: Includes EFL Cup)		Total	
Club	Season	Division	Apps	Goals	Apps	Goals	Apps	Goals	Apps	Goals
Birmingham City	2021–22	Championship	20	1	1	0	0	0	21	1
Birmingham City	2022–23	Championship	33	0	3	1	1	0	37	1
Birmingham City	2023–24	Championship	42	8	3	0	2	0	47	8
Birmingham City	Total		95	9	7	1	3	0	105	10
Rennes	2024–25	Ligue 1	23	0	2	1	—		25	1
Rennes	2025–26	Ligue 1	0	0	—		—		0	0
Rennes	2026–27	Ligue 1	0	0	—		—		0	0
Leicester City (loan)	2025–26	Championship	34	11	0	0	—		34	11
Wolverhampton Wanderers (loan)	2026–27	Championship	9	2	0	0	2	0	11	2
Career total			161	22	9	2	5	0	175	24

=== International ===
As of match played 4 October 2026

Appearances and goals by national team and year
National team	Year	Apps	Goals
Wales	2023	8	0
Wales	2024	8	0
Wales	2025	9	1
Wales	2026	5	0
Total		30	1

Scores and results list Wales' goal tally first.

List of international goals scored by Jordan James
No.	Date	Venue	Opponent	Score	Result	Competition
1.	15 November 2025	Rheinpark Stadion, Vaduz, Liechtenstein	Liechtenstein	1–0	1–0	2026 FIFA World Cup qualification

== Honours ==
Individual

- EFL Championship Young Player of the Season: 2025–26
- Leicester City Men’s Player of the Season: 2025–26
- Leicester City Players’ Player of the Season: 2025–26
- Leicester City Young Player of the Season: 2025–26
