= Mathys Silistrie =

French footballer (born 2005)

Personal information
- Date of birth: 16 September 2005 (age 21)
- Place of birth: Drancy, France
- Height: 1.88 m (6 ft 2 in)
- Position: Goalkeeper

Team information
- Current team: Quevilly-Rouen
- Number: 16

Youth career
- –2023: Rennes

Senior career*
Years	Team	Apps	(Gls)
2023–2025	Rennes B	37	(0)
2025–	Rennes	2	(0)
2026–	→ Quevilly-Rouen (loan)	0	(0)
- * Club domestic league appearances and goals as of 19 May 2026

Mathys Silistrie (born 16 September 2005) is a French professional footballer who plays as a goalkeeper for Ligue 3 club Quevilly-Rouen on loan from Rennes.

== Career ==
=== Early life ===
Born in Drancy, France, Silistrie is of Guadeloupean descent. He began his youth development in his hometown before moving to the youth academy of Évreux, a club notable for producing international goalkeepers Steve Mandanda and Brice Samba. In 2018, at the age of 13, Silistrie was recruited by Rennes, officially joining their academy two years later in 2020. He was part of a highly-regarded "2005 generation" at the club that included players such as Mathys Tel, Désiré Doué, and Jeanuël Belocian.

=== Rennes ===
Silistrie rose through the ranks of the Rennes academy, gaining prominence during the 2022–2023 Coupe Gambardella campaign. During that tournament, he helped the team reach the semi-finals by winning three consecutive penalty shootouts. Between 2021 and 2025, Silistrie became a fixture for the reserve team, making 34 appearances in the Championnat National 3 and two in the Championnat National 2.

On 4 June 2025, Silistrie signed his first professional contract, a one-year deal with an option for extension. Following the retirement of veteran goalkeeper Steve Mandanda in the summer of 2025, manager Habib Beye promoted Silistrie to the role of second-choice goalkeeper behind Brice Samba. On 21 December 2025, he made his professional debut in a Coupe de France round-of-64 match against Les Sables-d'Olonne, keeping a clean sheet in a 3–0 victory. On 8 January 2026, Silistrie signed a contract extension keeping him at the club until June 2029. On 7 February 2026, Silistrie made his Ligue 1 debut in a match against Lens at the Stade Bollaert-Delelis. He was selected to start by Habib Beye after the manager chose to drop the regular starter, Brice Samba, for performance and disciplinary reasons.

On 3 July 2026, Silistrie was loaned to Quevilly-Rouen.

== Career statistics ==
As of match played 17 May 2026

Appearances and goals by club, season and competition
Club	Season	League			Cup		Europe		Other		Total	
Club	Season	Division	Apps	Goals	Apps	Goals	Apps	Goals	Apps	Goals	Apps	Goals
Rennes B	2021–22	National 3	0	0	—		—		—		0	0
Rennes B	2021–22	National 2	2	0	—		—		—		2	0
Rennes B	2023–24	National 3	14	0	—		—		—		14	0
Rennes B	2024–25	National 3	20	0	—		—		—		20	0
Rennes B	2025–26	National 3	1	0	—		—		—		1	0
Rennes B	Total		37	0	—		—		—		37	0
Rennes	2025–26	Ligue 1	2	0	1	0	—		—		3	0
Career total			38	0	1	0	0	0	0	0	39	0
