= Charlie Cresswell =

English footballer

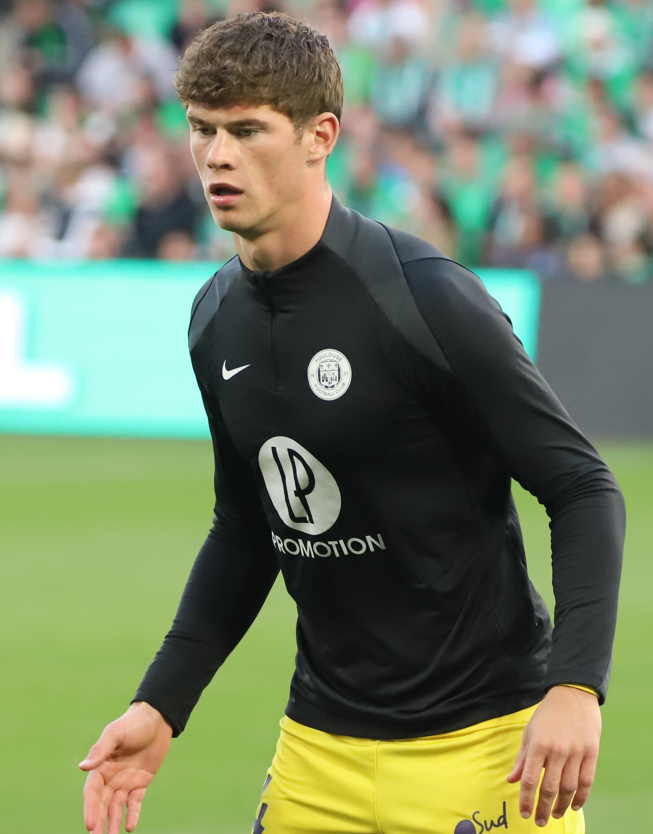
- Cresswell with Toulouse in 2025

Personal information
- Full name: Charlie Richard Cresswell
- Date of birth: 17 August 2002 (age 24)
- Place of birth: Preston, England
- Height: 6 ft 3 in (1.90 m)
- Position: Centre-back

Team information
- Current team: Rennes (on loan from Toulouse)
- Number: 4

Youth career
- 2013–2020: Leeds United

Senior career*
Years	Team	Apps	(Gls)
2020–2024	Leeds United	10	(0)
2022–2023	→ Millwall (loan)	28	(4)
2024–	Toulouse	60	(6)
2026–	→ Rennes (loan)	10	(0)

International career^{‡}
2021–2025	England U21	26	(3)
Medal record
Representing England
UEFA European Under-21 Championship
Winner	2023 Georgia–Romania
Winner	2025 Slovakia
- * Club domestic league appearances and goals as of 18:00, 8 November 2026 (UTC) ‡ National team caps and goals as of 19:00, 29 June 2025 (UTC)

Charlie Richard Cresswell (born 17 August 2002) is an English professional footballer who plays as a centre-back for Ligue 1 club Rennes, on loan from Toulouse.

== Club career ==
=== Leeds United ===
Cresswell was born in Preston, but grew up in York. He started his career at Leeds United in 2013, before signing a two-year scholarship with the club in 2018. He was included in the League Football Education's The 11 award for under-18 players in June 2019, and signed his first professional contract with the club in September 2019.

Cresswell made his debut for Leeds on 16 September 2020 against Hull City in the EFL Cup. Cresswell extended his contract to summer 2023 on 19 November 2020. Cresswell captained the under-23s to the Premier League 2 Division 2 title and was nominated along with teammate Sam Greenwood for the Premier League 2 Player of the Season award. Cresswell made his Premier League debut for Leeds United on 25 September 2021 in the starting line-up for the 2–1 defeat against West Ham United at Elland Road. In July 2023 Cresswell signed a new four-year contract with Leeds United.

==== Millwall (loan) ====
On 4 July 2022, Cresswell signed for EFL Championship club Millwall on a season-long loan deal. He scored two goals on his debut as Millwall beat Stoke City 2–0 in the first game of the season on 30 July.

=== Toulouse ===
On 8 July 2024, Cresswell moved to Ligue 1 club Toulouse on a permanent deal for an undisclosed fee. On 15 January 2025, he score his first goal for the club in a 2–1 victory over Laval in the Coupe de France. A month later, on 9 February, he netted his first Ligue 1 goal in a 2–2 away draw with Auxerre.

=== Rennes ===
On 4 August 2026, Cresswell joined fellow Ligue 1 side Rennes on loan, with the club reportedly agreeing a deal including a €2.5 million loan fee and an obligation to make the move permanent next year for a fixed €22.5 million, plus up to €3 million in bonuses.

== International career ==
On 2 October 2020, Cresswell was named in the England under-19 squad. He made his debut for the under-19s in a friendly match versus Scotland at St George's Park, scoring in the first half as England went into half-time with a 3–1 lead. However, the game was abandoned during the interval after a member of the coaching staff tested positive for COVID-19.

On 27 August 2021, Cresswell received his first call up for the England Under-21 squad. He made his debut for the side as a substitute in a 3–1 win over the Czech Republic on 11 November 2021. Cresswell was included in the England squad for the 2023 UEFA European Under-21 Championship. He started in their last group game. Cresswell was an unused substitute in the final as England defeated Spain to win the tournament.

Cresswell took part in the 2025 UEFA European Under-21 Championship, scoring a header in England's first match of the tournament, a 3–1 win against the Czech Republic. He played every minute of their competition including the final as England defeated Germany after extra time to retain the trophy. His performances during the competition resulted in him being chosen by the UEFA Technical Observer panel for their team of the tournament.

== Personal life ==
He is the son of former professional footballer Richard Cresswell, who played for Leeds United in the early 2000s and after retiring was part of the Leeds United academy coaching staff.

== Career statistics ==
As of match played 8 November 2026

Appearances and goals by club, season and competition
Club	Season	League			National cup (Note: Includes FA Cup, Coupe de France)		League cup (Note: Includes EFL Cup)		Other		Total	
Club	Season	Division	Apps	Goals	Apps	Goals	Apps	Goals	Apps	Goals	Apps	Goals
Leeds United U21	2020–21	—			—		—		1 (Note: Appearance in EFL Trophy)	0	1	0
Leeds United U21	2021–22	—			—		—		1	0	1	0
Leeds United U21	Total		—		—		—		2	0	2	0
Leeds United	2020–21	Premier League	0	0	0	0	1	0	—		1	0
Leeds United	2021–22	Premier League	5	0	0	0	1	0	—		6	0
Leeds United	2023–24	Championship	5	0	0	0	2	0	0	0	7	0
Leeds United	Total		10	0	0	0	4	0	0	0	14	0
Millwall (loan)	2022–23	Championship	28	4	1	0	1	0	—		30	4
Toulouse	2024–25	Ligue 1	31	3	3	1	—		—		34	4
Toulouse	2025–26	Ligue 1	29	3	3	1	—		—		32	4
Toulouse	Total		60	6	6	2	—		—		66	8
Rennes (loan)	2026–27	Ligue 1	10	0	0	0	—		4 (Note: Appearances in UEFA Europa League)	0	14	0
Career total			108	10	7	2	5	0	6	0	126	12

== Honours ==
England U21

- UEFA European Under-21 Championship: 2023, 2025

Individual

- UEFA European Under-21 Championship Team of the Tournament: 2025
