= Prosper Peter =

French footballer (born 2007)

Personal information
- Date of birth: 9 August 2007 (age 19)
- Place of birth: Paris, France
- Height: 1.88 m (6 ft 2 in)
- Position: Forward

Team information
- Current team: Angers
- Number: 35

Youth career
- 2013–2020: Étoile du Cens
- 2020–2022: JSC Bellevue Nantes
- 2022–2024: Angers

Senior career*
Years	Team	Apps	(Gls)
2024–	Angers B	22	(10)
2025–	Angers	31	(5)

International career^{‡}
2025–	France U19	3	(1)
- * Club domestic league appearances and goals as of 20 May 2026 ‡ National team caps and goals as of 23:45, 15 November 2025 (UTC)

Prosper Peter (born 9 August 2007) is a French professional footballer who plays as a forward for Ligue 1 club Angers.

== Career ==
Peter joined the youth academy of Angers in 2022 at the age of 14. In 2024, he made his debut in the Championnat National 2 with the club's reserve team. On 25 September 2024, Peter signed his first professional contract with Angers, a deal until 2027. On 27 April 2025, he made his Ligue 1 and professional debut as a 70th-minute substitute in a 2–0 defeat to Lille. On his first Ligue 1 start on 31 August 2025, he scored his first professional goal, helping Angers to a 1–1 draw against Rennes.

== Personal life ==
Born in France, Peter is of Nigerian descent.
