= Alan Do Marcolino =

Gabonese footballer (born 2002)

Personal information
- Full name: Fabrice-Alan Do Marcolino
- Date of birth: 19 March 2002 (age 24)
- Place of birth: Libreville, Gabon
- Height: 1.94 m (6 ft 4 in)
- Position: Forward

Team information
- Current team: Viagem Ústí nad Labem
- Number: 20

Youth career
- 2014-2017: Laval
- 2017–2022: Rennes

Senior career*
Years	Team	Apps	(Gls)
2020–2025	Rennes B	44	(15)
2023–2025	Rennes	3	(0)
2023–2024	→ Quevilly-Rouen (loan)	18	(0)
2023–2024	→ Quevilly-Rouen B (loan)	11	(3)
2024–2025	→ Orléans (loan)	19	(2)
2025–2026	Lusitânia	12	(0)
2026–	Viagem Ústí nad Labem	14	(6)

International career^{‡}
2022–	Gabon	12	(2)
- * Club domestic league appearances and goals as of 28 May 2026 ‡ National team caps and goals as of 17 November 2026

Fabrice-Alan Do Marcolino (born 19 March 2002) is a Gabonese professional footballer who plays as a forward for Czech National Football League club Viagem Ústí nad Labem and the Gabon national team.

== Early life ==
Born in Libreville, Gabon, Alan is the son of Gabonese international Fabrice Do Marcolino. He is the nephew of Arsène Do Marcolino, Fabrice's brother who also played for Gabon. Alan's brother Henrick and cousin Jonathan (Arsène's son) both play in the Rennes academy.

== Club career ==
Do Marcolino joined the Rennes academy from Laval in 2017, signing his first professional contract with the club from Rennes in April 2022.

On 8 August 2025, Do Marcolino signed a three-year contract with Lusitânia in Portugal.

On 6 February 2026, Do Marcolino signed a contract with Czech National Football League club Viagem Ústí nad Labem as a free agent.

== International career ==
Do Marcolino made his international debut for Gabon on 5 June 2022.

== Career statistics ==
=== Club ===
As of match played 4 October 2025

Appearances and goals by club, season and competition
Club	Season	League			Cup		League Cup		Europe		Total	
Club	Season	Division	Apps	Goals	Apps	Goals	Apps	Goals	Apps	Goals	Apps	Goals
Rennes B	2020–21	National 3	3	0	—		—		—		3	0
Rennes B	2021–22	National 3	22	5	—		—		—		22	5
Rennes B	2022–23	CFA 2	20	10	—		—		—		20	10
Rennes B	2024–25	CFA 2	2	0	—		—		—		2	0
Rennes B	Total		37	15	—		—		—		37	15
Rennes	2022–23	Ligue 1	3	0	0	0	—		—		3	0
Quevilly-Rouen B (loan)	2023–24	National 3	11	3	2	1	—		—		13	4
Quevilly-Rouen (loan)	2024–25	Ligue 2	18	0	0	0	—		—		18	0
Orléans (loan)	2024–25	CFA	19	2	3	1	—		—		22	3
Lusitânia	2025–26	Liga Portugal 2	3	0	1	0	0	0	—		4	0
Career total			91	20	6	2	0	0	0	0	97	22

=== International ===
As of match played 17 November 2026

Appearances and goals by national team and year
National team	Year	Apps	Goals
Gabon	2022	3	1
Gabon	2023	5	0
Gabon	2024	1	0
Gabon	2025	1	0
Gabon	2026	2	1
Total		12	2

Scores and results list Gabon's goal tally first, score column indicates score after each Marcolino goal.

List of international goals scored by Alan do Marcolino
No.	Date	Venue	Opponent	Score	Result	Competition
1	20 November 2022	Atilla Vehbi Konuk Tesisleri, Antalya, Turkey	Niger	3–1	3–1	Friendly
2	17 November 2026	Peter Mokaba Stadium, Polokwane, South Africa	Lesotho	1–2	1–2	2027 Africa Cup of Nations qualification
