= Marius Louër =

French footballer (born 2007)

Personal information
- Date of birth: 11 March 2007 (age 19)
- Place of birth: Saint-Herblain, France
- Position: Defender

Team information
- Current team: Angers
- Number: 20

Youth career
- 2012–2016: Saint-Aignan FC
- 2016–2021: FC Grand Lieu
- 2021–2022: Vertou
- 2022–2025: Angers

Senior career*
Years	Team	Apps	(Gls)
2024–	Angers B	29	(0)
2025–	Angers	9	(0)

International career^{‡}
2023	France U16	2	(0)
2023–2024	France U17	4	(0)
2024–2025	France U18	6	(0)
2025–	France U19	4	(0)
- * Club domestic league appearances and goals as of 20 May 2026 ‡ National team caps and goals as of 21:52, 24 March 2026 (UTC)

Marius Louër (born 11 March 2007) is a French professional footballer who plays as a defender for Ligue 1 club Angers.

== Club career ==
Louër joined the youth academy of Angers in 2022 and signed his first professional contract on 25 June 2025, a deal until 2028. On 20 March 2026, he made his first start in Ligue 1 for Angers in a 5–1 defeat away to Lens.

== International career ==
Louër is a France youth international. He participated at the 2024 UEFA European Under-17 Championship with the France under-17s. He was called up to the France under-19s for the first time in October 2025.
