= Arsène Do Marcolino =

Gabonese footballer (born 1986)

Personal information
- Full name: Arsène Do Marcolino Rogombé
- Date of birth: 26 November 1986 (age 39)
- Place of birth: Libreville, Gabon
- Height: 1.84 m (6 ft 0 in)
- Position: Defender

Team information
- Current team: Ernéenne Football

Senior career*
Years	Team	Apps	(Gls)
2002	FC 105 Libreville		
2002–2003	Rennes B	0	(0)
2003–2004	Angoulême	2	(0)
2004–2007	Lens B	2	(0)
2007–2008	Angers B	0	(0)
2008–2010	Les Herbiers VF	15	(0)
2010	Ulisses	1	(0)
2010–2011	ES Buxerolles		
2011–2012	Poitiers		
2012–2014	AC Bongoville		
2015–2018	FC 105 Libreville		
2018–2019	AS Bourny Laval		
2019–	Ernéenne Football		

International career^{‡}
2006–2010	Gabon	6	(0)
- * Club domestic league appearances and goals as of 16:35, 8 July 2020 (UTC) ‡ National team caps and goals as of 16:35, 8 July 2020 (UTC)

Arsène Do Marcolino Rogombé (born 26 November 1986) is a Gabonese footballer who plays as a defender for French club Ernéenne Football.

== Club career ==
Born in Libreville, Do Marcolino has played club football for FC 105 Libreville, Rennes B, Angoulême, Lens B, Angers B, Les Herbiers VF, Ulisses, ES Buxerolles, Poitiers, AC Bongoville, AS Bourny Laval and Ernéenne Football.

== International career ==
Do Marcolino made his international debut for Gabon in 2006, and earned 6 caps, which included participation at the 2010 Africa Cup of Nations.

== Personal life ==
His brother is fellow player Fabrice Do Marcolino, and their father and great-grandfather were also footballers. Arsène's son Jonathan is a youth player for Rennes, where he plays alongside Fabrice's son Henrick. Fabrice's older son Alan plays professionally.
