= Fabrice Do Marcolino =

Gabonese footballer (born 1983)

Personal information
- Full name: Fabrice Do Marcolino Anguilet
- Date of birth: 14 March 1983 (age 43)
- Place of birth: Libreville, Gabon
- Height: 1.82 m (6 ft 0 in)
- Position: Forward

Senior career*
Years	Team	Apps	(Gls)
2002–2004	Angoulême	26	(5)
2004–2005	Amiens	23	(4)
2005–2006	Vannes	28	(11)
2006–2009	Angers	99	(20)
2009–2013	Laval	111	(22)
2013–2014	Carquefou	26	(7)
2015	Istres	10	(1)
2016	Changé	3	(0)

International career
2004–2013	Gabon	26	(4)
- * Club domestic league appearances and goals

Fabrice Do Marcolino Anguilet (born 14 March 1983) is a Gabonese former professional footballer who played as a forward. He scored 4 goals in 26 appearances for the Gabon national team from 2004 to 2013.

== International career ==
Do Marcolino represented his country at the 2012 African Cup of Nations, during which Gabon, as hosts of the competition, reached the quarter-finals.

== Personal life ==
Fabrice's brother Arsène is also a former professional footballer. His older son Alan plays professionally, and his younger son Henrick plays in the Rennes academy, alongside his nephew Jonathan (Arsène's son).
