= Gonçalo Oliveira (footballer) =

Portuguese footballer (born 2006)

Personal information
- Full name: Gonçalo Calisto de Oliveira
- Date of birth: 4 July 2006 (age 20)
- Place of birth: Portugal
- Height: 1.83 m (6 ft 0 in)
- Position: Defender

Team information
- Current team: Rennes
- Number: 5

Youth career
- –2026: Benfica

Senior career*
Years	Team	Apps	(Gls)
2025–2026	Benfica B	26	(0)
2025–2026	Benfica	0	(0)
2026–	Rennes	0	(0)

International career^{‡}
2022–2023	Portugal U17	12	(1)
2023–2024	Portugal U18	15	(2)
2024–2025	Portugal U19	12	(0)
2025–	Portugal U21	4	(0)
- * Club domestic league appearances and goals as of 15 May 2026 ‡ National team caps and goals as of 18 November 2025

Gonçalo Calisto de Oliveira (born 4 July 2006) is a Portuguese professional footballer who plays as a defender for Rennes.

== Early life ==
Oliveira was born on 20 January 2006. Born in Portugal, he is a native of Lisbon, Portugal. Growing up, he regarded Portugal international Rúben Dias as his football idol.

== Club career ==
As a youth player, Oliveira joined the youth academy of Portuguese side Benfica at the age of five, helping the club's under-17 team win the league title and the under-19 team reach the semi-finals of the 2025–26 UEFA Youth League. In 2024, he was promoted to their under-23 team, where he made twenty-five league appearances and scored one goal.

Six months later, he was promoted to their reserve team, where he made twenty-six league appearances and scored two goals and was regarded as a regular starter while playing for them. The same year, he was promoted to their senior team, where he made zero league appearances and scored zero goals. During the summer of 2025, he was called up to the senior team for the 2025 FIFA Club World Cup under Portuguese manager Bruno Lage and continued to train with the senior team under Portuguese manager José Mourinho. After that, he received interest from Spanish La Liga side Barcelona. Ahead of the 2026–27 season, he signed for French Ligue 1 side Rennes, where he chose the number 5 jersey.

== International career ==
Oliveira is a Portugal youth international and has represented Portugal internationally at under-17, under-18, under-19, and under-21 level. During May 2023, he played for the Portugal national under-17 football team at the 2023 UEFA European Under-17 Championship.

During the spring of 2025, he played for the Portugal national under-19 football team for 2025 UEFA European Under-19 Championship qualification. During September, October, and November 2025, he played for the Portugal national under-21 football team for 2027 UEFA European Under-21 Championship qualification.

== Style of play ==
Oliveira plays as a defender. Left-footed, he has received comparisons to Portugal international Rúben Dias because of his leadership ability.

French news website Foot Mercato wrote in 2026 that he "boasts a modern and complete skillset. Standing tall at 1.83m, he began his development as a defensive midfielder before dropping back into defense, combining physical presence with game intelligence. He has a particular affinity for duels. Solid in one-on-one situations, he excels in the air and is a regular threat in the opposition's penalty area... precise distribution is also part of his repertoire... he possesses the rare ability to break through opposing lines with his passing and take calculated risks in build-up play. Tactical versatility adds to his many strengths. While he has established himself on the left side of a back four, his versatile background allows him to seamlessly integrate into a three-man defense or even fill in as a holding midfielder".
