= France national under-19 football team =

France Under-19
- Nickname(s): Les Bleuets (The Little Blues); Les Tricolores (The Tri-colours)
- Association: French Football Federation
- Confederation: UEFA (Europe)
- Head coach: Jean-Luc Vannuchi
- FIFA code: FRA
First colours	Second colours

European Championship
- Appearances: 13 (first in 2003)
- Best result: Winners (2005, 2010, 2016)

The France national under-19 football team is the national under-19 football team of France and is controlled by the French Football Federation. The team competes in the annual UEFA European Under-19 Football Championship. They were the 2010 champions of the competition having won on home soil. The under-19 team also contests the qualification matches needed to play in the FIFA U-20 World Cup, though the competition is classified as an under-20 tournament.

== Players ==
=== Current squad ===
The following players were called up for simultaneous matches in both the 2026 UEFA European Under-19 Championship qualification elite round and the 2027 UEFA European Under-19 Championship qualification first round matches between 25-31 March 2026.

- 2026 UEFA European Under-19 Championship qualification opponents: Norway, Switzerland, Croatia.
- 2027 UEFA European Under-19 Championship qualification opponents: Wales, Hungary, Switzerland.

No.	Pos.	Player	Date of birth (age)	Club
	GK	Mathys Niflore	2 March 2007 (age 19)	(French Football Federation) Dunkerque
	GK	Jules Stawiecki	10 April 2007 (age 19)	(French Football Federation) Monaco (Note: Monaco is a Monégasque club playing in the French football league system.)
	GK	Ilan Jourdren	17 July 2008 (age 18)	(French Football Federation) Lens
	GK	Martin James	14 February 2008 (age 18)	(French Football Federation) PSG
	DF	Tylel Tati	19 January 2008 (age 18)	(French Football Federation) Nantes
	DF	Axel Tape (captain)	10 August 2007 (age 19)	(German Football Association) Bayer 04 Leverkusen
	DF	Stephan Zagadou	24 October 2008 (age 18)	(French Football Federation) Le Havre
	DF	Seny Koumbassa	20 June 2007 (age 19)	(French Football Federation) Toulouse
	DF	Mathys Angély	21 April 2007 (age 19)	(Royal Belgian Football Association) Anderlecht
	DF	Marvyn Muzungu	28 November 2007 (age 18)	(Royal Dutch Football Association) Ajax
	DF	Melvin Gomes	26 March 2008 (age 18)	(French Football Federation) Monaco
	DF	Axel Dodote	18 January 2007 (age 19)	(French Football Federation) Saint-Étienne
	DF	Dimitri Lucea	20 January 2007 (age 19)	(French Football Federation) PSG
	DF	Abdoulaye Nassoko	29 March 2008 (age 18)	(French Football Federation) Metz
	DF	Ruben Lomet	20 August 2008 (age 18)	(French Football Federation) Rennes
	DF	Lucas Batbedat	1 August 2008 (age 18)	(French Football Federation) PSG
	DF	Emmanuel Mbemba	20 March 2008 (age 18)	(French Football Federation) PSG
	DF	Marius Louër	11 March 2007 (age 19)	(French Football Federation) Angers
	DF	Isyak Mohamed	21 February 2008 (age 18)	(French Football Federation) Montpellier
	MF	Marius Courcoul	1 January 2007 (age 19)	(French Football Federation) Angers
	MF	Abdoulaye Camara	28 September 2008 (age 18)	(Italian Football Federation) Udinese
	MF	Kaïs Lesueur	16 June 2008 (age 18)	(French Football Federation) Valenciennes
	MF	Alexis Vossah	11 March 2008 (age 18)	(French Football Federation) Toulouse
	MF	Rudy Matondo	13 March 2008 (age 18)	(French Football Federation) Paris FC
	MF	Khalis Merah	24 February 2007 (age 19)	(French Football Federation) Lyon
	MF	Djibril Coulibaly	18 November 2008 (age 17)	(French Football Federation) Nice
	MF	Paul Eymard	5 January 2008 (age 18)	(French Football Federation) Saint-Étienne
	MF	Aymen Assab	18 July 2008 (age 18)	(French Football Federation) PSG
	MF	Noah Vidal-Cartoux	27 March 2008 (age 18)	(French Football Federation) Montpellier
	MF	Milan Leccese	30 November 2008 (age 17)	(French Football Federation) Marseille
	FW	Mathys Detourbet	29 April 2007 (age 19)	(French Football Federation) Troyes
	FW	Rayane Messi	23 May 2007 (age 19)	(Saudi Arabian Football Federation) Neom SC
	FW	Tadjidine Mmadi	3 March 2007 (age 19)	(French Football Federation) Marseille
	FW	Moustapha Dabo	20 August 2007 (age 19)	(French Football Federation) Paris 13 Atletico
	FW	Tidiane Diarrassouba	29 August 2008 (age 18)	(French Football Federation) Reims
	FW	Adam Ayari	30 March 2008 (age 18)	(French Football Federation) PSG
	FW	Prosper Peter	9 August 2007 (age 19)	(French Football Federation) Angers
	FW	Enzo Molebe	18 September 2007 (age 19)	(French Football Federation) Montpellier
	FW	Pierre Mounguengue	3 January 2008 (age 18)	(French Football Federation) PSG
	FW	Jean-Baptiste Bosey	15 February 2008 (age 18)	(French Football Federation) Strasbourg
	FW	Mahamadou Sangaré	6 March 2007 (age 19)	(The Football Association) Manchester City
	FW	Antoine Valero	8 July 2008 (age 18)	(French Football Federation) Marseille

=== Recent callups ===
The following players have also been called up to the France under-19 squad and remain eligible:

Pos.	Player	Date of birth (age)	Caps	Goals	Club	Latest call-up

=== Previous squads ===
UEFA U-19 European Championships squads

- 2019 UEFA European U-19 Championship squads – France
- 2018 UEFA European U-19 Championship squads – France
- 2016 UEFA European U-19 Championship squads – France
- 2015 UEFA European U-19 Championship squads – France
- 2013 UEFA European U-19 Championship squads – France
- 2012 UEFA European U-19 Championship squads – France
- 2010 UEFA European U-19 Championship squads – France
- 2009 UEFA European U-19 Championship squads – France
- 2007 UEFA European U-19 Championship squads – France
- 2005 UEFA European U-19 Championship squads – France
- 2003 UEFA European U-19 Championship squads – France

== Competitive record ==
=== UEFA European U-19 Championship record ===
Year	Result	Pld	W	D*	L	GF	GA
(Norway) 2002	did not qualify						
(Liechtenstein) 2003	Group stage	3	0	2	1	4	6
(Switzerland) 2004	did not qualify						
(Northern Ireland) 2005	Champions	5	4	1	0	11	5
(Poland) 2006	did not qualify						
(Austria) 2007	Semi-finals	4	1	3	0	6	3
(Czech Republic) 2008	did not qualify						
(Ukraine) 2009	Semi-finals	4	1	2	1	4	5
(France) 2010	Champions	5	4	1	0	14	4
(Romania) 2011	did not qualify						
(Estonia) 2012	Semi-finals	4	2	1	1	8	5
(Lithuania) 2013	Runners-up	5	2	2	1	5	4
(Hungary) 2014	did not qualify						
(Greece) 2015	Semi-finals	4	3	0	1	6	3
(Germany) 2016	Champions	5	4	0	1	15	4
(Georgia (country)) 2017	did not qualify						
(Finland) 2018	Semi-finals	4	2	0	2	11	4
(Armenia) 2019	Semi-finals	4	3	1	0	5	0
(Northern Ireland) ~~2020~~	Cancelled						
(Romania) ~~2021~~	Cancelled						
(Slovakia) 2022	Semi-finals	4	3	0	1	12	4
(Malta) 2023	did not qualify						
(Northern Ireland) 2024	Runners-up	5	3	1	1	9	7
(Romania) 2025	did not qualify						
(Wales) 2026	did not qualify						
(Czech Republic) 2027	TBD						
(Bulgaria) 2028	TBD						
(Netherlands) 2029	TBD						
Total	3 titles	56	32	14	10	110	54

*Draws include knockout matches decided by penalty shootout.
**Gold background colour indicates that the tournament was won.
***Red border colour indicates tournament was held on home soil.

== 2022 UEFA European Under-19 Championship ==
=== Qualified teams for the final tournament ===
The following teams qualified for the final tournament of the 2022 UEFA European Under-19 Championship.

Note: All appearance statistics include only U-19 era (since 2002).

Team	Method of qualification	Appearance	Last appearance	Previous best performance
Slovakia	Hosts	2nd	2002	Third place (2002)
Romania	Elite round Group 4 winners	2nd	2011	Group Stage (2011)
Italy	Elite round Group 5 winners	8th	2019	Champions (2003)
Israel	Elite round Group 1 winners	2nd	2014	Group Stage (2014)
France	Elite round Group 2 winners	12th	2019	Champions (2005, 2010, 2016)
England	Elite round Group 3 winners	11th	2018	Champions (2017)
Austria	Elite round Group 7 winners	8th	2016	Semi-finals (2003, 2006, 2014)

== Honours ==
- UEFA European Under-19 Football Championship (8):

1949, 1983, 1996, 1997, 2000, 2005, 2010, 2016
