= Jonathan Do Marcolino =

Gabonese footballer

Personal information
- Full name: Arsène Jonathan Do Marcolino
- Date of birth: 10 May 2006 (age 20)
- Place of birth: Lens, France
- Height: 1.86 m (6 ft 1 in)
- Position: Left-back

Team information
- Current team: Annecy
- Number: 26

Youth career
- 2011–2014: US Lavalloise
- 2014–2017: Stade Lavallois
- 2017–2023: Rennes

Senior career*
| Years | Team | Apps | (Gls) |
| 2023–2025 | Rennes II | 28 | (3) |
| 2025–2026 | Rennes | 0 | (0) |
| 2025–2026 | → Bourg-en-Bresse (loan) | 19 | (1) |
| 2026– | Annecy | 3 | (0) |

International career^{‡}
| 2022 | France U16 | 1 | (1) |
| 2025– | Gabon | 3 | (0) |
- * Club domestic league appearances and goals as of 19 September 2026 ‡ National team caps and goals as of 22:41, 25 September 2026 (UTC)

Arsène Jonathan Do Marcolino (born 10 May 2006) is a professional footballer who plays as a left-back for Ligue 2 club Annecy. Born in France, he plays for the Gabon national team.

== Club career ==
Do Marcolino is a product of the youth academies of the French clubs US Lavalloise, Stade Lavallois, and Rennes. On 8 July 2025, he signed his first professional contract with Rennes until 2028. On 10 July 2025, he joined Bourg-en-Bresse on a season-long loan in the Championnat National.

== International career ==
Born in France, Do Marcolino is of Gabonese descent and holds dual French-Gabonese citizenship. He made one appearance for the France U16s in 2022 where he scored a goal. He was called up to the senior Gabon national team for a set of 2026 FIFA World Cup qualification matches in November 2025.

== Personal life ==
Do Marcolino comes from a family of footballers: his father Arsène, uncle Fabrice, and cousins Alan and Henrick Do Marcolino are all professional footballers.

== Career statistics ==
=== Club ===
As of match played 19 September 2026

Appearances and goals by club, season and competition
| Club | Season | League | | | Cup | | Europe | | Other | | Total | |
| Club | Season | Division | Apps | Goals | Apps | Goals | Apps | Goals | Apps | Goals | Apps | Goals |
|---|---|---|---|---|---|---|---|---|---|---|---|---|
| Rennes B | 2023–24 | CFA 2 | 6 | 1 | — | | — | | — | | 6 | 1 |
| Rennes B | 2024–25 | CFA 2 | 22 | 2 | — | | — | | — | | 22 | 2 |
| Rennes B | Total | | 28 | 3 | — | | — | | — | | 28 | 3 |
| Rennes | 2025–26 | Ligue 1 | 0 | 0 | 0 | 0 | — | | — | | 0 | 0 |
| Bourg-en-Bresse (loan) | 2025–26 | Ligue 3 | 19 | 1 | 3 | 0 | — | | — | | 22 | 1 |
| Annecy | 2026–27 | Ligue 2 | 3 | 0 | 0 | 0 | — | | — | | 3 | 0 |
| Career total | | | 50 | 4 | 3 | 0 | 0 | 0 | 0 | 0 | 53 | 4 |

=== International ===
As of match played 25 September 2026

Appearances and goals by national team and year
| National team | Year | Apps | Goals |
|---|---|---|---|
| Gabon | 2025 | 1 | 0 |
| Gabon | 2026 | 1 | 0 |
| Total | | 2 | 0 |
