= Nordan Mukiele =

French footballer (born 2006)

Personal information
- Date of birth: 12 February 2006 (age 20)
- Place of birth: Montreuil, France
- Height: 1.84 m (6 ft 0 in)
- Position: Forward

Team information
- Current team: Montpellier (on loan from Rennes)
- Number: 19

Youth career
- 2013–2019: Paris FC
- 2019–2021: RC Joinville
- 2021–2023: Rennes

Senior career*
Years	Team	Apps	(Gls)
2022–	Rennes B	54	(7)
2025–	Rennes	8	(1)
2026–	→ Montpellier (loan)	1	(0)

International career^{‡}
2022	France U16	5	(1)
- * Club domestic league appearances and goals as of 23:34, 8 August 2026 (UTC) ‡ National team caps and goals as of 16 April 2022

Nordan Mukiele (born 12 February 2006) is a French professional footballer who plays as a forward for Ligue 2 club Montpellier, on loan from Ligue 1 club Rennes.

== Club career ==
Mukiele was born in Montreuil, France. He played for the youth teams of Paris FC and RC Joinville before joining the Rennes academy in 2021.

On 14 March 2024, Mukiele signed his first professional contract with Rennes, agreeing to a three-year deal until 2027. In June 2025, Mukiele signed a contract extension, prolonging his stay at the club until 2028. In July 2025, Mukiele took part in the professional team's summer preparation, featuring in a friendly match against Stade Briochin.

On 28 September 2025, he made his first team debut for Rennes, coming on as a second-half substitute in a 0–0 draw against Lens in Ligue 1.

On 1 August 2026, Mukiele joined Montpellier on a season-long loan.

== International career ==
Between March and April 2022, Mukiele represented France at under-16 level, earning five caps and scoring one goal.

== Personal life ==
He is the younger brother of defender Nordi Mukiele.
