= Rayan Bamba =

French footballer

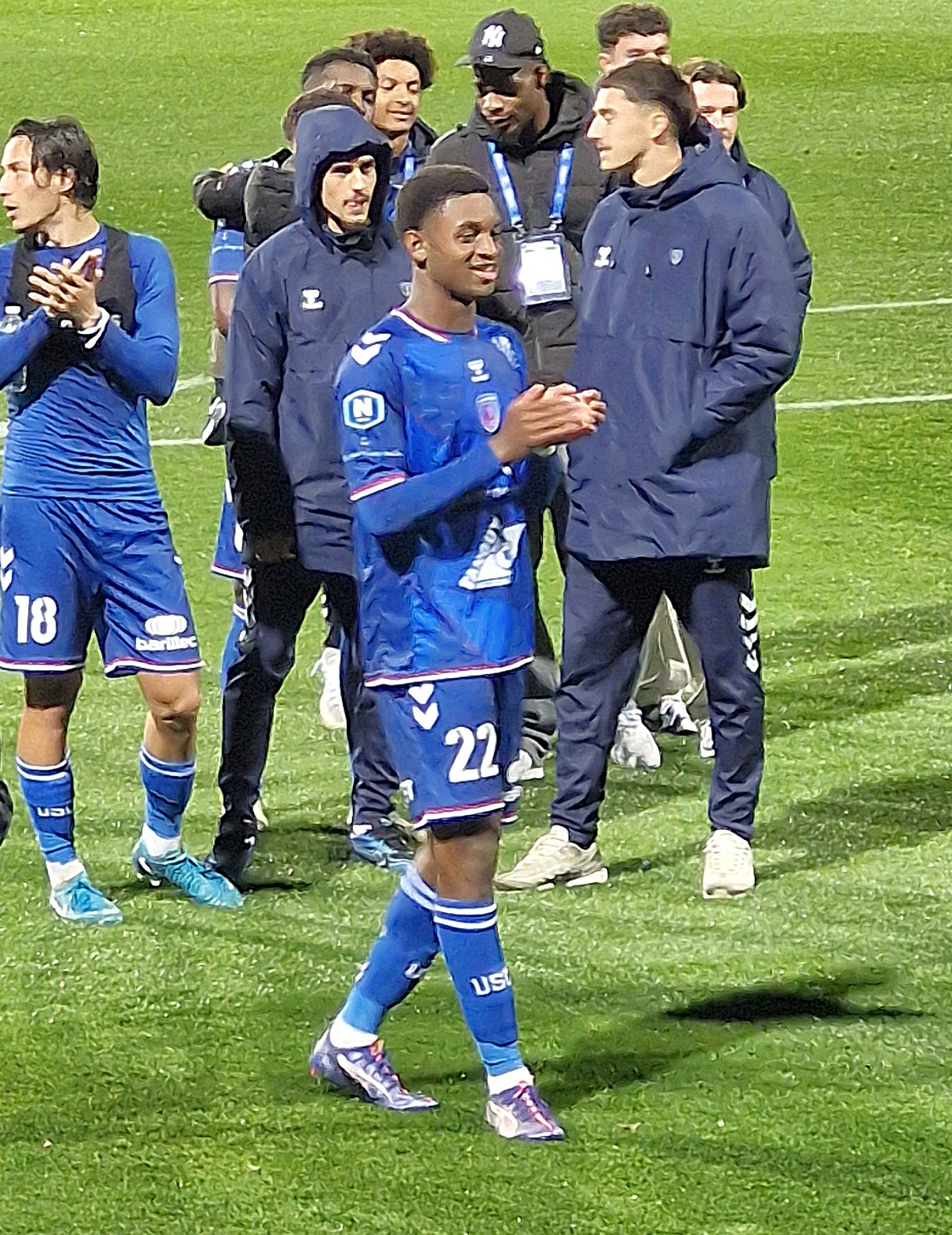

Personal information
- Date of birth: 14 May 2004 (age 22)
- Place of birth: Paris, France
- Height: 1.85 m (6 ft 1 in)
- Positions: Right-back; right wing-back

Team information
- Current team: Le Mans (on loan from Rennes)
- Number: 26

Youth career
- 2010–2021: Montrouge FC 92
- 2021–2022: Rennes

Senior career*
Years	Team	Apps	(Gls)
2022–	Rennes II	46	(3)
2024–	Rennes	0	(0)
2024–2025	→ Concarneau (loan)	26	(1)
2025–2026	→ Nancy (loan)	20	(2)
2026–	→ Le Mans (loan)	0	(0)
- * Club domestic league appearances and goals as of 31 July 2026

Rayan Bamba (born 14 May 2004) is a French professional footballer who plays as a right-back or right wing-back for Ligue 1 club Le Mans, on loan from Ligue 1 club Rennes.

== Club career ==
Bamba is a product of the youth academies of the French clubs Montrouge FC 92 and Rennes. He was promoted to Rennes' reserves in 2022, and on 27 May 2024 signed his first professional contract with the club until 2025. On 17 July 2024, he joined Concarneau on loan in the Championnat National. He made the 2024–25 Team of the Season in the Championnat National. On 2 June 2025, he returned to Rennes and extended his contract until 2027. On 15 August 2025, he joined Nancy on a season-long loan in Ligue 2.

In August 2026, Bamba joined Le Mans on a season-long loan from Rennes after extending his contract with the club until 2028. After completing the move, he described Le Mans as the best environment for his development and said regular playing time would help him continue his progress as a player.

== Personal life ==
Born in France, Bamba is of Ivorian descent.
