= Abdelhamid Aït Boudlal =

Moroccan footballer (born 2006)

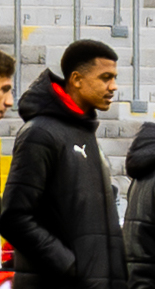
- Aït Boudlal in 2025

Personal information
- Date of birth: 16 April 2006 (age 20)
- Place of birth: Marrakesh, Morocco
- Height: 1.90 m (6 ft 3 in)
- Position: Centre-back

Team information
- Current team: Rennes
- Number: 48

Youth career
- 2015–2024: Mohammed VI Football Academy

Senior career*
Years	Team	Apps	(Gls)
2024–	Rennes II	6	(0)
2024–	Rennes	20	(2)
2025	→ Amiens (loan)	9	(0)

International career^{‡}
2022–2023	Morocco U17	17	(3)
2024–	Morocco U20	4	(0)
2025–	Morocco	2	(0)
Medal record
Men's football
Representing Morocco
Africa Cup of Nations
Winner	2025 Morocco
U-17 Africa Cup of Nations
Runner-up	2023 Algeria
U-20 Africa Cup of Nations
Runner-up	2025 Egypt
- * Club domestic league appearances and goals as of 19 May 2026 ‡ National team caps and goals as of 29 September 2026

Abdelhamid Aït Boudlal (Arabic: عبد الحميد آيت بودلال; born 16 April 2006) is a Moroccan professional footballer who plays as a centre-back for Ligue 1 club Rennes and the Morocco national team.

== Club career ==
On 11 October 2023, Aït Boudlal was named by English newspaper The Guardian as one of the best players born in 2006 worldwide.

On 2 July 2024, Aït Boudlal signed his first professional contract for Ligue 1 club Stade Rennais FC.

On 3 February 2025, Aït Boudlal moved to Amiens in Ligue 2 on loan until the end of the season.

== International career ==
Aït Boudlal was called up to the Morocco under-17 squad for the 2022 Arab Cup U-17, where he helped Morocco to second place, having lost 4–2 in the penalty shoot-out of the final match against hosts Algeria. He was called up again for the 2023 U-17 Africa Cup of Nations, where he scored two goals, including the opening goal in the final, as Morocco finished second again, this time to Senegal. For his performances, including a stellar display in Morocco's 3–0 quarter-final win over Algeria, he was named in the Team of the Tournament.

On 8 November 2023, Aït Boudlal was selected to take part in the 2023 FIFA U-17 World Cup.

On 11 December 2025, Aït Boudlal was called up to the Morocco squad for the 2025 Africa Cup of Nations.

== Honours ==
Morocco U17

- U-17 Africa Cup of Nations runner-up: 2023

Morocco U20

- U-20 Africa Cup of Nations runner-up: 2025

Morocco

- Africa Cup of Nations: 2025
