= 2001–02 ES Wasquehal season =

ES Wasquehal
2001–02 season
- French Division 2: 15th
- Coupe de France: Eighth round
- Coupe de la Ligue: First round

The 2001–02 season was the 78th season in the existence of ES Wasquehal and the club's third consecutive season in the second division of French football. In addition to the domestic league, ES Wasquehal competed in this season's edition of the Coupe de France and Coupe de la Ligue. The season covered the period from 1 July 2001 to 30 June 2002.

== Players ==
=== First-team squad ===
Note: Flags indicate national team as defined under FIFA eligibility rules; some limited exceptions apply. Players may hold more than one non-FIFA nationality.

No.	Pos.	Nation	Player
—	GK	FRA	Jean-Marc Sibille
—	GK	FRA	Julien Gibert
—	GK	FRA	Eric Bourgois
—	DF	FRA	Gilles Leclerc
—	DF	FRA	Sébastien Dailly
—	DF	FRA	Thierry Cygan
—	DF	FRA	Guillaume Benon
—	DF	FRA	Paul Leroy
—	DF	ROU	Ion Florin Calugarita
—	DF	FRA	Fabrice Correia
—	DF	ALG	Icham Mouissi
—	MF	FRA	Reynald Debaets
—	MF	FRA	Oumar Bakari
—	MF	MAR	Yazid Kaïssi
—	MF	GLP	Steve Bizasène

No.	Pos.	Nation	Player
—	MF	MAR	Abdelmajid Oulmers
—	MF	FRA	Stéphane Capiaux
—	MF	FRA	Jean Antunes
—	MF	FRA	Foued Soltani
—	MF	ALG	Fethi Mohad
—	FW	TOG	Robert Malm
—	FW	ANG	Titi Buengo
—	FW	CGO	Richard Akiana
—	FW	FRA	Geoffrey Dernis
—	FW	ARG	Patricio D'Amico
—	FW	FRA	William Loko
—	FW	FRA	Sébastien Fidani
—	FW	FRA	Philippe Marchois

== Pre-season and friendlies ==
Win Draw Loss

24 July 2001 Friendly	Wasquehal (France)	0–0	(France) Lens	Armentières, France
18:30 CEST (UTC+2)

30 December 2001 Friendly	Wasquehal (France)	0–2	(France) Lens	Wasquehal, France
17:00 CET (UTC+1)			Bąk 59'; Bouden 90'	Stadium: Stade Arthur Buyse; Attendance: 500
Note: Match was played in three 30-minute periods.

== Competitions ==
=== Overall record ===
Competition	First match	Last match	Starting round	Final position	Record							
Competition	First match	Last match	Starting round	Final position	Pld	W	D	L	GF	GA	GD	Win %
Division 2	28 July 2001	3 May 2002	Matchday 1	15th	38	11	10	17	43	55	−12	28.95
Coupe de France	4 November 2001	24 November 2001	Seventh round	Eighth round	2	1	0	1	8	5	+3	50.00
Coupe de la Ligue	1 September 2001		First round	First round	1	0	0	1	1	2	−1	0.00
Total					41	12	10	19	52	62	−10	29.27

Source: Competitions

=== French Division 2 ===
==== League table ====
Pos	Team	Pld	W	D	L	GF	GA	GD	Pts
13	Saint-Étienne	38	11	13	14	35	42	−7	46
14	Gueugnon	38	9	17	12	42	49	−7	44
15	Wasquehal	38	11	10	17	43	55	−12	43
16	Grenoble	38	10	12	16	38	55	−17	42
17	Istres	38	8	17	13	34	43	−9	41

Source: Ligue 2

==== Results summary ====
Overall								Home						Away					
Pld	W	D	L	GF	GA	GD	Pts	W	D	L	GF	GA	GD	W	D	L	GF	GA	GD
38	11	10	17	43	55	−12	43	6	8	5	26	28	−2	5	2	12	17	27	−10

Source: Ligue 2

==== Results by round ====
Round	1	2	3	4	5	6	7	8	9	10	11	12	13	14	15	16	17	18	19	20	21	22	23	24	25	26	27	28	29	30	31	32	33	34	35	36	37	38
Ground	H	A	H	A	H	A	A	H	A	H	A	H	A	H	A	H	A	H	A	H	A	H	A	H	H	A	H	A	H	A	H	A	H	A	H	A	H	A
Result	L	L	W	D	D	L	L	W	W	D	L	L	L	D	L	L	W	W	W	W	L	D	W	W	D	W	D	L	D	L	W	L	D	L	L	D	L	L
Position	20	20	13	12	13	17	19	19	16	16	18	19	20	17	18	18	17	16	13	13	13	13	15	11	12	9	10	12	12	14	10	10	13	13	13	14	15	15

Source: Ligue 2
A = Away; H = Home; W = Win; D = Draw; L = Loss

=== Coupe de la Ligue ===
1 September 2001 First round	Le Havre	2–1	Wasquehal	Le Havre
--:-- CEST (UTC+2)				Stadium: Stade Jules-Deschaseaux; Attendance: 4,137; Referee: Thierry Desessart

=== Goalscorers ===
Rank	No.	Pos	Nat	Name	Division 2	Coupe de France	Coupe de la Ligue	Total	
1	1	FW	(France)	[[]]	0	0	0	0	
2	2	MF	(France)	[[]]	0	0	0	0	
2	Totals					0	0	0	0
