= 2000–01 FC Metz season =

FC Metz
2000–01 season
- President: Charles Molinari
- Head coach: Joël Muller (until December); Albert Cartier
- Stadium: Stade Saint-Symphorien
- French Division 1: 12th
- Coupe de France: Round of 32
- Coupe de la Ligue: Round of 32
- Top goalscorer: League: Gérald Baticle (15); All: Gérald Baticle (15)
- Average home league attendance: 18,388
- Biggest win: Metz 3–0 Saint-Étienne
- Biggest defeat: Monaco 6–1 Metz

The 2000–01 FC Metz season was the club's 69th season in existence and the 34th consecutive season in the top flight of French football. In addition to the domestic league, Metz will participate in this season's edition of the Coupe de France and Coupe de la Ligue. The season covers the period from 1 July 2000 to 30 June 2001.

== Competitions ==
=== Overview ===
Competition	First match	Last match	Starting round	Final position	Record							
Competition	First match	Last match	Starting round	Final position	Pld	W	D	L	GF	GA	GD	Win %
French Division 1	29 July 2000	19 May 2001	Matchday 1	12th	34	11	9	14	35	44	−9	32.35
Coupe de France	20 January 2021	10 February 2001	Round of 64	Round of 32	2	1	0	1	3	5	−2	50.00
Coupe de la Ligue	7 January 2001		Round of 32	Round of 32	1	0	0	1	1	3	−2	0.00
Total					37	12	9	16	39	52	−13	32.43

Source: Competitions

=== French Division 1 ===
==== League table ====
Pos	Team	Pld	W	D	L	GF	GA	GD	Pts
10	Guingamp	34	11	11	12	40	48	−8	44
11	Monaco	34	12	7	15	53	50	+3	43
12	Metz	34	11	9	14	35	44	−9	42
13	Auxerre	34	11	8	15	31	41	−10	41
14	Lens	34	9	13	12	37	39	−2	40

Source: Ligue 1
Rules for classification: 1) points; 2) goal difference; 3) number of goals scored.

==== Results summary ====
Overall								Home						Away					
Pld	W	D	L	GF	GA	GD	Pts	W	D	L	GF	GA	GD	W	D	L	GF	GA	GD
34	11	10	13	37	44	−7	43	8	6	3	24	17	+7	3	4	10	13	27	−14

Source: French Division 1

==== Results by round ====
Round	1	2	3	4	5	6	7	8	9	10	11	12	13	14	15	16	17	18	19	20	21	22	23	24	25	26	27	28	29	30	31	32	33	34
Ground	A	H	A	H	A	H	A	H	H	A	H	A	H	A	H	A	H	A	H	A	H	A	H	A	A	H	A	H	A	H	A	H	A	H
Result	D	L	D	W	L	W	W	W	L	L	D	L	W	L	D	L	D	L	D	L	D	W	L	D	L	W	L	W	D	L	W	W	L	W
Position	10	13	13	11	13	10	5	4	7	10	12	13	10	14	15	15	14	16	16	17	16	17	17	17	17	17	17	15	16	16	15	13	15	12

Source: French Division 1
A = Away; H = Home; W = Win; D = Draw; L = Loss

==== Matches ====
29 July 2000 1	Bordeaux	1–1	Metz	Bordeaux

5 August 2000 2	Metz	1–2	Auxerre	Metz
				Stadium: Stade Saint-Symphorien

12 August 2000 3	Lyon	0–0	Metz	Lyon

19 August 2000 4	Metz	1–0	Paris Saint-Germain	Metz
				Stadium: Stade Saint-Symphorien

26 August 2000 5	Lille	2–1	Metz	Lille

6 September 2000 6	Metz	1–0	Strasbourg	Metz
				Stadium: Stade Saint-Symphorien

9 September 2000 7	Rennes	0–1	Metz	Rennes

16 September 2000 8	Metz	1–0	Sedan	Metz
				Stadium: Stade Saint-Symphorien

23 September 2000 9	Metz	1–3	Monaco	Metz
				Stadium: Stade Saint-Symphorien

30 September 2000 10	Bastia	1–0	Metz	Furiani

14 October 2000 11	Metz	2–2	Troyes	Metz
				Stadium: Stade Saint-Symphorien

21 October 2000 12	Saint-Étienne	2–0	Metz	Saint-Étienne

29 October 2000 13	Metz	2–1	Lens	Metz
				Stadium: Stade Saint-Symphorien

4 November 2000 14	Nantes	2–0	Metz	Nantes

11 November 2000 15	Metz	1–1	Guingamp	Metz
				Stadium: Stade Saint-Symphorien

17 November 2000 16	Marseille	4–1	Metz	Marseille

25 November 2000 17	Metz	1–1	Toulouse	Metz
				Stadium: Stade Saint-Symphorien

29 November 2000 18	Auxerre	1–0	Metz	Auxerre

2 December 2000 19	Metz	0–0	Lyon	Metz
				Stadium: Stade Saint-Symphorien

9 December 2000 20	Paris Saint-Germain	1–0	Metz	Paris

16 December 2000 21	Metz	1–1	Lille	Metz
				Stadium: Stade Saint-Symphorien

13 January 2001 23	Metz	0–2; Awarded	Rennes	Metz
				Stadium: Stade Saint-Symphorien

27 January 2001 24	Sedan	0–0	Metz	Sedan

3 February 2001 25	Monaco	6–1	Metz	Monaco

7 February 2001 26	Metz	3–2	Bastia	Metz
				Stadium: Stade Saint-Symphorien

17 February 2001 27	Troyes	3–2	Metz	Troyes

3 March 2001 28	Metz	3–0	Saint-Étienne	Metz
				Stadium: Stade Saint-Symphorien

17 March 2001 29	Lens	1–1	Metz	Lens

7 April 2001 30	Metz	1–2	Nantes	Metz
				Stadium: Stade Saint-Symphorien

11 April 2001 22	Strasbourg	0–1	Metz	Strasbourg

14 April 2001 31	Guingamp	1–3	Metz	Guingamp

28 April 2001 32	Metz	1–0	Marseille	Metz
				Stadium: Stade Saint-Symphorien

12 May 2001 33	Toulouse	2–1	Metz	Toulouse

19 May 2001 34	Metz	2–0	Bordeaux	Metz
				Stadium: Stade Saint-Symphorien

=== Coupe de France ===
20 January 2001 Round of 64	FC Dieppe	1–2	Metz
18:00

10 February 2001 Round of 32	Bastia	4–1	Metz	Furiani
20:00				Stadium: Stade Armand Cesari; Attendance: 3,500

=== Coupe de la Ligue ===
7 January 2001 Round of 32	Wasquehal	3–1	Metz	Villeneuve d'Ascq
18:00	Capiaux 47'; Oulmers 61'; Loko 90+3'		Proment 66'	Stadium: Stadium Lille-Métropole; Attendance: 3,119; Referee: Philippe Malige
