= 2011 CONCACAF U-20 Championship squads =

Below are the rosters for the 2011 CONCACAF U-20 Championship held in Guatemala from March 28 – April 10, 2011.

== Group A ==
=== Guatemala ===
Coach: (Uruguay) Ever Hugo Almeida

No.	Pos.	Player	Date of birth (age)	Caps	Goals	Club
1	GK	Diego Armando Chacon	14 July 1992 (aged 18)			(United States Soccer Federation) Chivas USA
2	DF	José Humberto Andrade	April 11, 1991 (aged 19)			(National Football Federation of Guatemala) Cobán Imperial
3	DF	Manuel Enrique Moreno	June 18, 1991 (aged 19)			(National Football Federation of Guatemala) Juventud Retalteca
4	DF	Willian Omar Ramirez	April 21, 1991 (aged 19)			(National Football Federation of Guatemala) Nueva Concepción
5	DF	Elías Vásquez	June 18, 1992 (aged 18)			(National Football Federation of Guatemala) Comunicaciones
6	MF	José Javier del Aguila	March 7, 1991 (aged 20)			(National Football Federation of Guatemala) Comunicaciones
7	MF	Marvin Ceballos	April 22, 1992 (aged 18)			(National Football Federation of Guatemala) Comunicaciones
8	MF	José Carlos Castillo	February 18, 1992 (aged 19)			(United States Soccer Federation) Virginia Commonwealth
9	FW	Henry David López	August 8, 1992 (aged 18)			(Brazilian Football Confederation) Noroeste Bauru
10	MF	Kevin Norales	January 26, 1992 (aged 19)			(National Football Federation of Guatemala) Marquense
11	FW	Kendel Herrarte	April 6, 1992 (aged 18)			(National Football Federation of Guatemala) Comunicaciones
12	GK	José Carlos Morales	February 14, 1991 (aged 20)			(National Football Federation of Guatemala) La Gomera
14	DF	José Manuel Lemus	November 5, 1992 (aged 18)			(National Football Federation of Guatemala) Comunicaciones
15	DF	Sixto Betancourt	May 16, 1992 (aged 18)			(National Football Federation of Guatemala) Juventud Retalteca
16	MF	Cristian Lima	October 2, 1992 (aged 18)			(National Football Federation of Guatemala) Jalapa
17	MF	Marco Tulio Rivas	April 20, 1991 (aged 19)			(National Football Federation of Guatemala) Municipal
18	FW	Abner Bonilla	October 5, 1991 (aged 19)			(National Football Federation of Guatemala) Cobán Imperial
19	DF	Jonathan Rodriguez	August 22, 1991 (aged 19)			(United States Soccer Federation) Guatemalan Soccer Academy
20	MF	Gerson Lima	November 10, 1992 (aged 18)			(National Football Federation of Guatemala) Jalapa
21	GK	José Carlos Garcia	February 16, 1993 (aged 18)			(National Football Federation of Guatemala) Nueva Concepción

=== Honduras ===
Coach: (Honduras) Javier Padilla

No.	Pos.	Player	Date of birth (age)	Caps	Goals	Club
1	GK	Gerson Argueta	March 10, 1991 (aged 20)			(National Autonomous Federation of Football of Honduras) Olimpia
2	MF	Jorge Escobar	March 19, 1991 (aged 20)			(National Autonomous Federation of Football of Honduras) Motagua
3	DF	Jorge Cardona	March 6, 1991 (aged 20)			(National Autonomous Federation of Football of Honduras) Platense
4	DF	Ever Alvarado	January 30, 1992 (aged 19)			(National Autonomous Federation of Football of Honduras) Real España
5	DF	Bryan Castro	March 5, 1991 (aged 20)			(National Autonomous Federation of Football of Honduras) Real España
6	DF	Allan Rivas	January 6, 1992 (aged 19)			(National Autonomous Federation of Football of Honduras) Olimpia
7	MF	Wilmer Fuentes	April 21, 1992 (aged 18)			(National Autonomous Federation of Football of Honduras) Marathón
8	MF	Clayvin Zúñiga	March 29, 1991 (aged 19)			(National Autonomous Federation of Football of Honduras) Real España
9	FW	Anthony Lozano	April 25, 1993 (aged 17)			(National Autonomous Federation of Football of Honduras) Olimpia
10	DF	Alexander López	June 5, 1992 (aged 18)			(National Autonomous Federation of Football of Honduras) Olimpia
11	FW	Román Castillo	November 20, 1991 (aged 19)			(National Autonomous Federation of Football of Honduras) Vida
12	GK	Marlon Licona	February 9, 1991 (aged 20)			(National Autonomous Federation of Football of Honduras) Motagua
13	DF	José Tobías	January 20, 1992 (aged 19)			(National Autonomous Federation of Football of Honduras) Real España
14	MF	José Garza	April 13, 1991 (aged 19)			(National Autonomous Federation of Football of Honduras) Real España
15	DF	Sifredo Lozano	November 19, 1991 (aged 19)			(National Autonomous Federation of Football of Honduras) Platense
16	DF	Johny Rivera	April 27, 1992 (aged 18)			(National Autonomous Federation of Football of Honduras) Real España
17	MF	Davián Quiñónez	June 21, 1992 (aged 18)			(National Autonomous Federation of Football of Honduras) Olimpia
18	MF	Néstor Martínez	May 4, 1992 (aged 18)			(National Autonomous Federation of Football of Honduras) Olimpia
19	FW	Eddie Hernández	February 27, 1991 (aged 20)			(National Autonomous Federation of Football of Honduras) Platense
20	DF	Gustavo Carías	July 22, 1991 (aged 19)			(National Autonomous Federation of Football of Honduras) Necaxa

=== Jamaica ===
Coach: (Brazil) Walter Gama

No.	Pos.	Player	Date of birth (age)	Caps	Goals	Club
1	GK	Gregory McKogg	March 9, 1992 (aged 19)			(Jamaica Football Federation) St. Elizabeth Technical High School
2	DF	Oniel Fisher	November 22, 1991 (aged 19)			(Jamaica Football Federation) St. George's
3	DF	Richardo Israel	September 9, 1991 (aged 19)			Unattached
4	DF	Jhamie Hyde	December 21, 1992 (aged 18)			(Jamaica Football Federation) Harbour View
5	DF	Sergio Campbell	January 16, 1992 (aged 19)			(Jamaica Football Federation) Clarendon College
6	FW	Jamiel Hardware	March 12, 1992 (aged 19)			(Jamaica Football Federation) Boys' Town
7	FW	Craig Foster	September 7, 1991 (aged 19)			(Jamaica Football Federation) Reno
8	MF	Devon Williams	April 8, 1992 (aged 18)			(Jamaica Football Federation) St. George's
9	MF	Marvin Morgan, Jr.	August 16, 1992 (aged 18)			(Jamaica Football Federation) Boys' Town
10	FW	Paul Wilson	July 16, 1993 (aged 17)			(Jamaica Football Federation) Glenmuir High School
11	MF	Ricardo Morris	November 2, 1992 (aged 18)			(Jamaica Football Federation) Portmore United
12	FW	Allan Ottey	December 18, 1992 (aged 18)			(Jamaica Football Federation) Portmore United
13	GK	Kemar Foster	August 30, 1992 (aged 18)			(Jamaica Football Federation) Innswood High School
14	MF	Denmark Gillings	October 28, 1991 (aged 19)			(Jamaica Football Federation) St. Elizabeth Technical High School
15	MF	Neco Brett	March 22, 1992 (aged 19)			(Jamaica Football Federation) Excelsior High School
16	DF	Kemar Lawrence	September 17, 1992 (aged 18)			(Jamaica Football Federation) Harbour View
17	MF	Ewan Grandison	November 28, 1991 (aged 19)			(Jamaica Football Federation) Lennon High School
18	MF	Ashani Walker	July 10, 1992 (aged 18)			(Jamaica Football Federation) Jamaica College
19	DF	Jason Wallace	December 13, 1991 (aged 19)			Unattached
20	MF	Jason Watson	March 2, 1991 (aged 20)			(Jamaica Football Federation) Waterhouse F.C.

== Group B ==
=== Panama ===
Coach: (Panama) Jose Alfredo Poyatos

No.	Pos.	Player	Date of birth (age)	Caps	Goals	Club
1	GK	Kevin Melgar	19 November 1992 (aged 18)	9	0	(Panamanian Football Federation) Alianza F.C.
2	DF	Edward Benitez	15 October 1991 (aged 19)	7	0	(Panamanian Football Federation) Chorrillo F.C.
3	DF	Harold Cummings	1 March 1992 (aged 19)	9	1	(Uruguayan Football Association) River Plate
4	DF	Josue Flores	31 March 1993 (aged 17)	8	0	(Panamanian Football Federation) Chorrillo F.C.
5	MF	Manuel Vargas	19 January 1991 (aged 20)	7	0	(Panamanian Football Federation) Tauro F.C.
6	DF	Francisco Vence	11 April 1992 (aged 18)	6	0	(Panamanian Football Federation) Chorrillo F.C.
7	MF	Jairo Jimenéz	7 January 1993 (aged 18)	5	0	(Royal Spanish Football Federation) Torrellano Illice CF
8	MF	Paul Cordero	28 March 1991 (aged 20)	8	0	(Panamanian Football Federation) Chepo F.C.
9	FW	Cecilio Waterman	13 April 1991 (aged 19)	12	8	(Uruguayan Football Association) Centro Atlético Fénix
10	MF	Josimar Gomez	28 June 1992 (aged 18)	8	0	(Panamanian Football Federation) Chepo F.C.
11	FW	Javier Caicedo	14 July 1991 (aged 19)	6	2	(Panamanian Football Federation) Plaza Amador
12	GK	Adnihell Ariano	14 January 1991 (aged 20)	2	0	(Panamanian Football Federation) Tauro F.C.
13	DF	Oscar Linton	29 January 1993 (aged 18)	3	0	(Panamanian Football Federation) Chepo F.C.
14	DF	Jose Pimentel	30 April 1992 (aged 18)	4	0	(Panamanian Football Federation) San Francisco F.C.
15	DF	Roberto Chen	24 May 1994 (aged 16)	3	0	(Panamanian Football Federation) San Francisco F.C.
16	MF	Rolando Botello	20 November 1991 (aged 19)	5	0	(Panamanian Football Federation) Tauro F.C.
17	FW	Gabriel Avila	12 April 1991 (aged 19)	8	5	(Panamanian Football Federation) Atletico Chiriquí
18	MF	Erick Davis	31 March 1991 (aged 19)	8	2	(Panamanian Football Federation) Deportivo Arabe Unido
19	DF	Algish Dixon	11 April 1992 (aged 18)	6	0	(Panamanian Football Federation) Alianza F.C.
20	FW	José Diego Álvarez	28 March 1991 (aged 20)	8	3	(Football Association of the Czech Republic) Slavia Prague

=== Suriname ===
Coach: (Suriname) Harold Deyl

No.	Pos.	Player	Date of birth (age)	Caps	Goals	Club
1	GK	Firgilio Lamsberg	27 January 1991 (aged 20)	5	0	
2	DF	Gillermo Faerber	15 April 1992 (aged 18)	7	0	(Surinamese Football Association) SV Leo Victor
4	DF	Albert Nibte	20 May 1993 (aged 17)	7	0	(Surinamese Football Association) SV Leo Victor
5	DF	Rocky Kaise	7 April 1992 (aged 18)	7	0	(Surinamese Football Association) S.V. Transvaal
6	MF	Daninhio Gill	18 May 1992 (aged 18)	3	0	(Surinamese Football Association) SV Voorwaarts
7	MF	Vitorino Pinas	4 October 1992 (aged 18)	7	2	(Surinamese Football Association) S.V. Robinhood
8	MF	Olvido Misidjang	15 January 1991 (aged 20)	7	1	(Surinamese Football Association) SV Leo Victor
9	FW	Arsenio Poina	2 March 1993 (aged 18)	1	0	(Surinamese Football Association) SV Leo Victor
10	FW	Daniel Afiankoi	26 February 1992 (aged 19)	7	1	(Surinamese Football Association) S.V. Robinhood
11	MF	Julnes Plet	13 March 1991 (aged 20)	5	1	(Surinamese Football Association) SV Voorwaarts
12	MF	Kevin Martin	16 November 1992 (aged 18)	5	0	(Surinamese Football Association) S.V. Transvaal
13	DF	Klinston Vrede	20 February 1991 (aged 20)	0	0	
14	DF	Kevin Veira	29 April 1993 (aged 17)	6	0	(Surinamese Football Association) SV Leo Victor
15	FW	Dimitrie Apai	19 July 1994 (aged 16)	6	2	(Surinamese Football Association) S.V. Transvaal
16	FW	Stefano Rijssel	26 March 1992 (aged 19)	5	7	(Surinamese Football Association) SV Leo Victor
17	MF	Jerny Faerber	15 April 1992 (aged 18)	5	0	(Surinamese Football Association) S.V. Transvaal
18	MF	Quintin Dors	25 April 1991 (aged 19)	0	0	
19	GK	Rainel Godfried	27 March 1992 (aged 19)	2	0	(Surinamese Football Association) S.V. Robinhood
20	MF	Ilunga Edwards	0 December 1991 (aged 19–20)	0	0	
22	GK	Claidel Kohinor	7 February 1992 (aged 19)	5	0	(Surinamese Football Association) SV Leo Victor

=== United States ===
Coach: (Netherlands) Thomas Rongen

No.	Pos.	Player	Date of birth (age)	Caps	Goals	Club
1	GK	Zac MacMath	August 7, 1991 (aged 19)			(United States Soccer Federation) Philadelphia Union
2	DF	Gale Agbossoumonde	November 17, 1991 (aged 19)			(Swedish Football Association) Djurgården
3	DF	Zarek Valentin	August 6, 1991 (aged 19)			(United States Soccer Federation) Chivas USA
4	DF	Moisés Hernández	August 16, 1992 (aged 18)			(United States Soccer Federation) FC Dallas
5	DF	Perry Kitchen	February 29, 1992 (aged 19)			(United States Soccer Federation) D.C. United
6	MF	Dillon Powers	February 14, 1991 (aged 20)			(United States Soccer Federation) University of Notre Dame
7	MF	Joe Gyau	September 16, 1992 (aged 18)			(German Football Association) 1899 Hoffenheim
8	MF	Sebastian Lletget	September 3, 1992 (aged 18)			(The Football Association) West Ham United
9	FW	Conor Doyle	October 13, 1991 (aged 19)			(The Football Association) Derby County
10	MF	Kelyn Rowe	December 2, 1991 (aged 19)			(United States Soccer Federation) UCLA
11	FW	Bobby Wood	November 15, 1992 (aged 18)			(German Football Association) 1860 Munich
12	DF	Šaćir Hot	June 10, 1991 (aged 19)			(United States Soccer Federation) New York Red Bulls
13	DF	Greg Garza	August 16, 1991 (aged 19)			(Portuguese Football Federation) Estoril Praia
14	MF	Amobi Okugo	March 13, 1991 (aged 20)			(United States Soccer Federation) Philadelphia Union
15	DF	Korey Veeder	October 3, 1991 (aged 19)			(United States Soccer Federation) Columbus Crew
16	MF	Moises Orozco	February 6, 1992 (aged 19)			(Mexican Football Federation) UANL
17	FW	Omar Salgado	September 10, 1993 (aged 17)			(Canadian Soccer Association) Vancouver Whitecaps
18	GK	Cody Cropper	February 16, 1993 (aged 18)			(The Football Association) Ipswich Town
19	DF	Sebastien Ibeagha	January 21, 1992 (aged 19)			(United States Soccer Federation) Duke University
20	FW	Eder Arreola	November 13, 1991 (aged 19)			(United States Soccer Federation) UCLA

== Group C ==
=== Canada ===
Coach: (Canada) Valerio Gazzola

No.	Pos.	Player	Date of birth (age)	Caps	Goals	Club
1	GK	Julien Latendresse-Lévesque	February 27, 1991 (aged 20)			(German Football Association) Energie Cottbus
2	DF	Tristan Grant	January 31, 1992 (aged 19)			(Uruguayan Football Association) Nacional
3	MF	Ben Fisk	February 4, 1993 (aged 18)			(Canadian Soccer Association) Vancouver Whitecaps
4	DF	Doneil Henry	April 20, 1993 (aged 17)			(Canadian Soccer Association) Toronto FC
5	DF	Derrick Bassi	February 29, 1992 (aged 19)			(Canadian Soccer Association) Vancouver Whitecaps
6	MF	Matt Stinson	September 9, 1992 (aged 18)			(Canadian Soccer Association) Toronto FC
7	MF	Russell Teibert	December 22, 1992 (aged 18)			(Canadian Soccer Association) Vancouver Whitecaps
8	MF	Ethan Gage	May 8, 1991 (aged 19)			(The Football Association) Reading
9	FW	Stefan Cebara	April 12, 1991 (aged 19)			(Hungarian Football Federation) Zalaegerszeg
10	MF	Jonathan Osorio	December 6, 1991 (aged 19)			(Uruguayan Football Association) Nacional
11	MF	John Pegg	May 12, 1991 (aged 19)			(United States Soccer Federation) San Diego State University
12	FW	Justin Maheu	January 23, 1992 (aged 19)			(German Football Association) Fortuna Düsseldorf
13	DF	Andrés Fresenga	October 13, 1992 (aged 18)			(Uruguayan Football Association) Racing Club
14	FW	Coulton Jackson	February 10, 1992 (aged 19)			(Canadian Soccer Association) Vancouver Whitecaps
15	FW	Massimo Mirabelli	October 21, 1991 (aged 19)			(Canadian Soccer Association) SC Toronto
16	DF	Roger Thompson	December 19, 1991 (aged 19)			(United States Soccer Federation) University of Cincinnati
17	FW	Lucas Cavallini	December 28, 1992 (aged 18)			(Uruguayan Football Association) Nacional
18	GK	Jordan Santiago	March 4, 1991 (aged 20)			(Football Association of Wales) Cardiff City
19	FW	Jordan Ongaro	January 14, 1992 (aged 19)			(United States Soccer Federation) San Diego State University
20	DF	Francesco Augustin	February 3, 1992 (aged 19)			(Canadian Soccer Association) Montreal Impact

=== Costa Rica ===
Coach: (Costa Rica) Ronald Gonzalez

No.	Pos.	Player	Date of birth (age)	Caps	Goals	Club
1	GK	Mauricio Vargas	February 27, 1991 (aged 20)			(Royal Spanish Football Federation) Albacete
2	DF	Jordan Smith	January 31, 1992 (aged 19)			(French Football Federation) Le Havre
3	DF	Keiner Brown	February 4, 1993 (aged 18)			(Costa Rican Football Federation) Brujas
4	DF	Ariel Contreras	April 20, 1993 (aged 17)			(Costa Rican Football Federation) Saprissa
5	MF	Rafael Chávez	February 29, 1992 (aged 19)			(Costa Rican Football Federation)
6	FW	John Jairo Ruiz	September 9, 1992 (aged 18)			(Costa Rican Football Federation) Saprissa
7	FW	Mynor Escoe	December 22, 1992 (aged 18)			(French Football Federation) Lorient
8	MF	Juan Bustos Golobio	May 8, 1991 (aged 19)			(Costa Rican Football Federation) Saprissa
9	FW	Joshua Díaz	April 12, 1991 (aged 19)			(Costa Rican Football Federation) Puntarenas
10	FW	Joel Campbell	December 6, 1991 (aged 19)			(Costa Rican Football Federation) Saprissa
11	MF	Bryan Vega	May 12, 1991 (aged 19)			(Costa Rican Football Federation) Brujas
12	MF	Diego Calvo	January 23, 1992 (aged 19)			(Costa Rican Football Federation) Alajuelense
13	MF	Pablo Martínez	October 13, 1992 (aged 18)			(Costa Rican Football Federation) Alajuelense
14	FW	Vianney Blanco	February 10, 1992 (aged 19)			(Costa Rican Football Federation) Alajuelense
15	DF	Joseph Mora	October 21, 1991 (aged 19)			(Costa Rican Football Federation) Alajuelense
16	DF	Ariel Soto	December 19, 1991 (aged 19)			(Costa Rican Football Federation) Brujas
17	MF	Yeltsin Tejeda	December 28, 1992 (aged 18)			(Costa Rican Football Federation) Saprissa
18	GK	Kevin Briceño	March 4, 1991 (aged 20)			(Costa Rican Football Federation) Brujas
19	FW	Deyver Vega	January 14, 1992 (aged 19)			(Costa Rican Football Federation) Brujas
20	FW	Esteban López	February 3, 1992 (aged 19)			(Costa Rican Football Federation) Brujas

=== Guadeloupe ===
Coach: (Guadeloupe) Steve Bizasene

No.	Pos.	Player	Date of birth (age)	Caps	Goals	Club
1	GK	Kevin Anselme	July 25, 1991 (aged 19)			(Ligue guadeloupéenne de football) Evolucas
2	DF	Mathieu Roda	May 23, 1992 (aged 18)			(Ligue guadeloupéenne de football) Phare du Canal
3	DF	Pierre Saint-Geraud	March 7, 1993 (aged 18)			(Ligue guadeloupéenne de football) La Gauloise
4	DF	Jeremy Valmy	August 16, 1991 (aged 19)			(Ligue guadeloupéenne de football) CS Moulien
5	DF	Kévin Lumon	June 23, 1991 (aged 19)			(Ligue guadeloupéenne de football) CS Moulien
6	MF	Johan Angloma	October 18, 1993 (aged 17)			(Ligue guadeloupéenne de football) Etoile
7	MF	Wilhelm Séverin	May 13, 1991 (aged 19)			(Ligue guadeloupéenne de football) Stade Lamentinois
8	FW	Joey Mérabli	February 9, 1991 (aged 20)			(Ligue guadeloupéenne de football) Stade Lamentinois
9	FW	Vladimir Pascal	May 27, 1992 (aged 18)			(Ligue guadeloupéenne de football) AS Dragon
10	FW	Thomas Grava	January 9, 1992 (aged 19)			(Ligue guadeloupéenne de football) Evolucas
11	MF	Neil Roche	April 26, 1991 (aged 19)			(Ligue guadeloupéenne de football) JS Vieux-Habitants
12	MF	Christophe Houelche	February 3, 1991 (aged 20)			(Ligue guadeloupéenne de football) CS Moulien
13	FW	Ludovic Piqueur	January 28, 1991 (aged 20)			(Ligue guadeloupéenne de football) Siroco les Abymes
14	MF	Jean-Marc Hatchi	January 30, 1992 (aged 19)			(French Football Federation) Stade Malherbe Caen
15	FW	Kevin Sainte-Luce	April 28, 1993 (aged 17)			(Football Association of Wales) Cardiff City
16	GK	Jordan Sennoaj	March 12, 1992 (aged 19)			(Ligue guadeloupéenne de football) Jeunesse Evolution
17	DF	Jérôme Eliezer	June 22, 1993 (aged 17)			(Ligue guadeloupéenne de football) Etoile
18	MF	Rohann Rambojan	October 24, 1991 (aged 19)			(Ligue guadeloupéenne de football) Evolucas
19	MF	Krismiler Bolmin	March 30, 1991 (aged 19)			(Ligue guadeloupéenne de football) CS Moulien
20	DF	Lewis Laporal	January 3, 1991 (aged 20)			(French Football Federation) AC Amboise

== Group D ==
=== Cuba ===
No.	Pos.	Player	Date of birth (age)	Club
1	GK	Odisnel Cooper	31 March 1992 (aged 18)	(Football Association of Cuba)
2	DF	Ariel Moret	11 March 1991 (aged 20)	(Football Association of Cuba)
3	DF	Jorge Corrales	20 May 1991 (aged 19)	(Football Association of Cuba)
4	DF	Dairo Macias	10 May 1991 (aged 19)	(Football Association of Cuba)
5	DF	Renay Malblanche	8 August 1991 (aged 19)	(Football Association of Cuba)
6	MF	Osay Martinez	19 May 1991 (aged 19)	(Football Association of Cuba)
7	MF	Ricardo Pena	21 December 1992 (aged 18)	(Football Association of Cuba)
8	DF	Darío Suárez	8 August 1992 (aged 18)	(Football Association of Cuba)
9	FW	Yaudel Lahera	9 February 1992 (aged 19)	(Football Association of Cuba)
10	MF	Maikel Chang	18 April 1991 (aged 19)	(Football Association of Cuba)
11	FW	Yasnay Rivero	11 July 1991 (aged 19)	(Football Association of Cuba)
12	GK	Andy Ramos	23 February 1991 (aged 20)	(Football Association of Cuba)
13	MF	Over Urgellez	14 January 1992 (aged 19)	(Football Association of Cuba)
14	DF	Carlos Castellano	8 September 1991 (aged 19)	(Football Association of Cuba)
15	DF	Angel Rodriguez	4 March 1991 (aged 20)	(Football Association of Cuba)
16	FW	Daniel Cantero	3 December 1991 (aged 19)	(Football Association of Cuba)
17	MF	Dayron Blanco	2 October 1992 (aged 18)	(Football Association of Cuba)
18	DF	Francisco Salazar	21 March 1991 (aged 20)	(Football Association of Cuba)

=== Mexico ===
Coach: (Mexico) Juan Carlos Chávez

No.	Pos.	Player	Date of birth (age)	Caps	Goals	Club
1	GK	José Antonio Rodríguez	July 4, 1991 (aged 19)			(Mexican Football Federation) Guadalajara
2	DF	Kristian Álvarez	April 20, 1992 (aged 18)			(Mexican Football Federation) Guadalajara
3	DF	Alexis Loera	February 9, 1991 (aged 20)			(Mexican Football Federation) Atlas
4	DF	Nestor Araújo	August 29, 1991 (aged 19)			(Mexican Football Federation) Cruz Azul
5	MF	Diego de Buen	July 13, 1991 (aged 19)			(Mexican Football Federation) UNAM
6	MF	Marvin Piñón	June 12, 1991 (aged 19)			(Mexican Football Federation) Monterrey
7	MF	Saúl Villalobos	June 26, 1991 (aged 19)			(Mexican Football Federation) Atlas
8	MF	Carlos Orrantía	February 1, 1991 (aged 20)			(Mexican Football Federation) UNAM
9	FW	Taufic Guarch	October 4, 1991 (aged 19)			(Mexican Football Federation) Estudiantes Tecos
10	MF	Jorge Mora	January 16, 1991 (aged 20)			(Mexican Football Federation) Guadalajara
11	FW	Ulises Dávila	April 13, 1991 (aged 19)			(Mexican Football Federation) Guadalajara
12	GK	Carlos López	March 21, 1991 (aged 20)			(Argentine Football Association) Talleres de Córdoba
13	FW	Lugiani Gallardo	April 20, 1991 (aged 19)			(Mexican Football Federation) América
14	MF	Jorge Enríquez	January 8, 1991 (aged 20)			(Mexican Football Federation) Guadalajara
15	DF	César Ibáñez	April 1, 1992 (aged 18)			(Mexican Football Federation) Atlas
16	DF	Jorge Valencia	April 6, 1991 (aged 19)			(Mexican Football Federation) UANL
17	FW	Alan Pulido	March 8, 1991 (aged 20)			(Mexican Football Federation) UANL
18	DF	Diego Reyes	September 19, 1992 (aged 18)			(Mexican Football Federation) América
19	FW	Edson Rivera	November 4, 1991 (aged 19)			(Mexican Football Federation) Atlas
20	FW	David Izazola	October 23, 1991 (aged 19)			(Mexican Football Federation) UNAM

=== Trinidad and Tobago ===
Coach: (Serbia) Zoran Vraneš

No.	Pos.	Player	Date of birth (age)	Caps	Goals	Club
1	GK	John Thomas	November 18, 1993 (aged 17)			(Trinidad and Tobago Football Association) Fatima College
2	MF	Isaiah Melville-Fergusson	November 13, 1991 (aged 19)			(United States Soccer Federation) University of South Carolina Upstate
4	DF	Sheldon Bateau	January 29, 1991 (aged 20)			(Trinidad and Tobago Football Association) San Juan Jabloteh
5	DF	Akeem Adams	April 13, 1991 (aged 19)			(Trinidad and Tobago Football Association) United Petrotrin
6	DF	Joevin Jones	March 8, 1991 (aged 20)			(Trinidad and Tobago Football Association) W Connection
7	FW	Shahdon Winchester	January 8, 1992 (aged 19)			(Trinidad and Tobago Football Association) W Connection
8	MF	Kenaz Williams	January 22, 1992 (aged 19)			(Trinidad and Tobago Football Association) Joe Public
9	MF	Cordell Cato	July 15, 1992 (aged 18)			(Trinidad and Tobago Football Association) San Juan Jabloteh
10	FW	Jerrel Britto	July 4, 1992 (aged 18)			(Trinidad and Tobago Football Association) San Juan Jabloteh
11	MF	Johan Peltier	March 26, 1992 (aged 19)			(Trinidad and Tobago Football Association) San Juan Jabloteh
12	DF	Akil Clarke	September 25, 1991 (aged 19)			(Trinidad and Tobago Football Association) St. Ann's Rangers
13	MF	Jerron Quashie	November 13, 1991 (aged 19)			(Trinidad and Tobago Football Association) University of Trinidad and Tobago
14	DF	Jerron Morris	September 10, 1991 (aged 19)			(Trinidad and Tobago Football Association) Defence Force
15	DF	Dwight Ceballo	June 6, 1992 (aged 18)			(Trinidad and Tobago Football Association) Ma Pau
16	MF	Ryan Frederick	June 11, 1992 (aged 18)			(Trinidad and Tobago Football Association) W Connection
17	MF	Marcus Joseph	April 29, 1991 (aged 19)			(Trinidad and Tobago Football Association) Joe Public
19	DF	Weslie John	July 29, 1991 (aged 19)			(Trinidad and Tobago Football Association) W Connection
21	GK	Stefan Berkley	September 27, 1991 (aged 19)			(United States Soccer Federation) University of Connecticut
