= Thierry Cygan =

French footballer (born 1975)

Personal information
- Date of birth: 4 April 1975 (age 51)
- Place of birth: Lens, France
- Height: 1.80 m (5 ft 11 in)
- Position: Defender

Senior career*
Years	Team	Apps	(Gls)
1996–2002	Wasquehal	140	(6)
2002–2008	Angers	114	(4)
2008–2009	AS Cherbourg	5	(0)
2009–2010	Cholet	6	(0)
- * Club domestic league appearances and goals

Thierry Cygan (born 4 April 1975) is a French former footballer who played as a defender for SO Cholet.

== Career ==
In the 1996-1997 season, he played 24 matches and won the Championnat National with ES Wasquehal. He then played five seasons in the Ligue 2 for Wasquehal. In 2002, he was signed up by Angers.

While playing for Angers in the 2002–03 season, he finishes as the runner-up in the National. As a result, Angers was promoted to the Ligue 2 under the leadership of Éric Guérit. After two seasons in the Ligue 2, the club was relegated once again.

In 2008, after Angers finished the season on the 10th spot, the club fires him after six seasons spent in the Maine-et-Loire.

In November 2008, Cygan signed a one-year-and-a-half deal with AS Cherbourg. He played his first game in the Coupe de France against Vannes OC on 22 November 2008 (final score: 3–1 to Vannes, after extra time).

After the club was relegated to the CFA, Cygan joined SO Cholet in the CFA2.

He retired in 2011 and in 2012 he was appointed the coach of USSCA Champtocé in the French Regional Football League (DRH).

== Personal life ==
Thierry is the younger brother of Pascal Cygan.
