= Mehmed Baždarević =

Bosnian footballer and manager (born 1960)

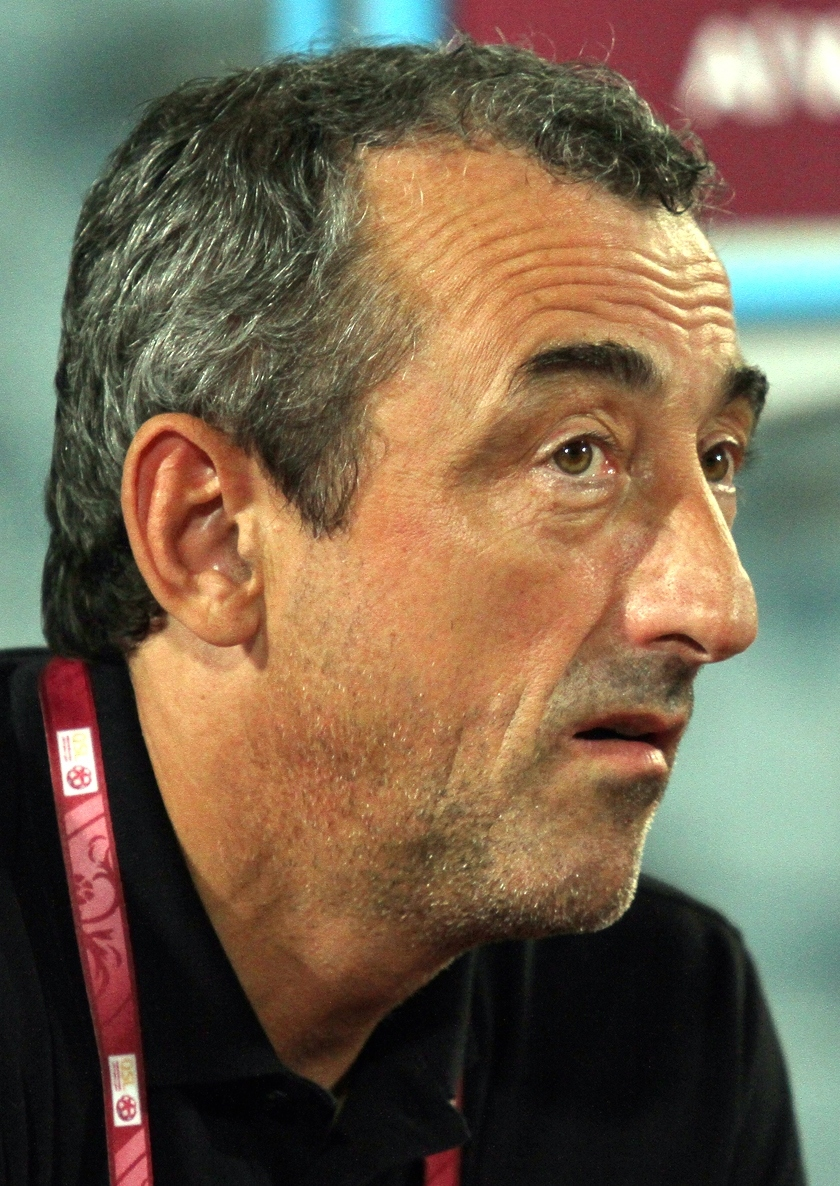
- Baždarević as Al-Wakrah manager in 2012

Personal information
- Date of birth: 28 September 1960 (age 66)
- Place of birth: Višegrad, FPR Yugoslavia
- Height: 1.78 m (5 ft 10 in)
- Position: Midfielder

Senior career*
Years	Team	Apps	(Gls)
1978–1987	Željezničar	229	(22)
1987–1996	Sochaux	308	(20)
1996–1997	Nîmes	32	(0)
1998	Étoile Carouge	6	(0)
Total		575	(42)

International career
1983–1992	Yugoslavia	54	(4)
1996	Bosnia and Herzegovina	2	(0)

Managerial career
- 1998–2003: Sochaux (assistant)
- 2003–2005: Istres
- 2005–2006: Étoile du Sahel
- 2006–2007: Al-Wakrah
- 2007–2010: Grenoble
- 2011–2012: Sochaux
- 2012–2013: Al-Wakrah
- 2014–2017: Bosnia and Herzegovina
- 2018–2019: Paris FC
- 2020–2021: Guingamp
Medal record
Men's Football
Representing Yugoslavia
Olympic Games
Bronze medal – third place	1984 Los Angeles	Team
- * Club domestic league appearances and goals

Mehmed Baždarević (born 28 September 1960) is a Bosnian professional football manager and former player. He was most recently the manager of Ligue 2 club Guingamp.

Baždarević played for Bosnian side Željezničar and French outfit Sochaux, among others. Nicknamed Meša in the former Yugoslavia and Mécha in France, he is considered to be one of the best football players to come from Bosnia and Herzegovina.

Internationally, Baždarević earned caps with Yugoslavia and took part in playing at UEFA Euro 1984. He also played for Bosnia and Herzegovina after the breakup of Yugoslavia in 1992. He was the first captain of the Bosnia national team. He retired as a player in 1998 and moved into management.

== Club career ==
=== Željezničar ===
Born in Višegrad, FPR Yugoslavia, present-day Bosnia and Herzegovina, Baždarević's professional playing career started in Željezničar in 1978. He was part of the team that managed to reach the UEFA Cup semi-finals in 1985 under the guidance of Ivica Osim.

In the 1980–81 season, Željezničar reached the Yugoslav Cup final (Marshal Tito Cup final), with 20-year-old Baždarević scoring two goals in a 2–3 loss to another Bosnian side Velež Mostar. The venue of the final was Red Star Stadium in Belgrade played in front of 40,000 football fans.

Baždarević played more than 300 games for the club.

=== Sochaux ===
In 1987, Baždarević moved to French club Sochaux alongside compatriot Faruk Hadžibegić. He stayed at the club until 1996. He collected more than 350 appearances for Sochaux in various competitions.

=== Later career and retirement ===
After Željezničar and Sochaux, Baždarević played for Nîmes (1996–97 season) and Swiss side Étoile Carouge (1997–98 season) before he announced his retirement in the summer of 1998.

As a player, Baždarević was targeted by many clubs including Barcelona, Arsenal and Borussia Dortmund.

== International career ==
Baždarević played for the national teams of two countries. He played for the Yugoslavia junior, Olympic and under-21 teams. He captained the under-20 national team that took part in the 1979 FIFA World Youth Championship. His debut for the senior Yugoslavia national team came in 1983 in a friendly match against France. He collected 54 caps and scored four goals for the national team. He represented the Yugoslavia at UEFA Euro 1984 playing in all the team's games at the tournament.

Baždarević began to play for the Bosnia and Herzegovina national team in 1992 after Bosnia and Herzegovina gained independence. However, the team was not recognised by FIFA until 1995 in part due to the Bosnian War. He made his official debut for them in a September 1996 FIFA World Cup qualification match away against Greece and has earned a total of 2 caps, scoring no goals. His second and final international was a month later against Croatia.

== Managerial career ==
=== Early career ===
From 1 July 1998 to 30 June 2003, Baždarević worked as Sochaux assistant manager to Jean Fernandez and Guy Lacombe before taking over as manager of reserve sides at the club.

=== Istres ===
Baždarević's first job as a manager was at Istres. He guided the club to its biggest success – entering the French Ligue 1 in 2004, which secured him a best Ligue 2 Manager of the Year award. During this stint, he started working with Stéphane Gilli, who became his assistant manager for 17 years.

=== Étoile ===
On 16 July 2005, Baždarević took over Tunisian side Étoile du Sahel. He reached the 2005 CAF Champions League final with the club. Baždarević was fired by Etoile on 12 April 2006, after a 1–0 home defeat to USM Monastir in their final league game which cost them the Tunisian championship.

=== Al-Wakrah ===
Baždarević was employed as manager of Qatar Stars League club Al-Wakrah in 2006.

=== Grenoble ===
In December 2007, Baždarević became the manager of French side Grenoble where he arrived on recommendation of his mentor, Ivica Osim, who knew Grenoble's Japanese owners from working with them in J.League with JEF United Chiba. He rejected offers from top league clubs Le Mans and Nice to take over Grenoble. At the end of the 2007–08 Ligue 2 season, Grenoble, led by Baždarević, gained promotion to the Ligue 1, for the first time in their history. Under Baždarević, the club reached the French Cup semi-finals during the 2008–09 season.

In September 2010, he left Grenoble due to financial reasons.

=== Sochaux ===
On 10 June 2011, Baždarević was named as manager of Sochaux, for which he played as a player. He was sacked on 6 March 2012, due to poor results after only 8 months in charge.

After Sochaux, he had interest to manage clubs from Serbia and Belgium.

=== Bosnia and Herzegovina ===
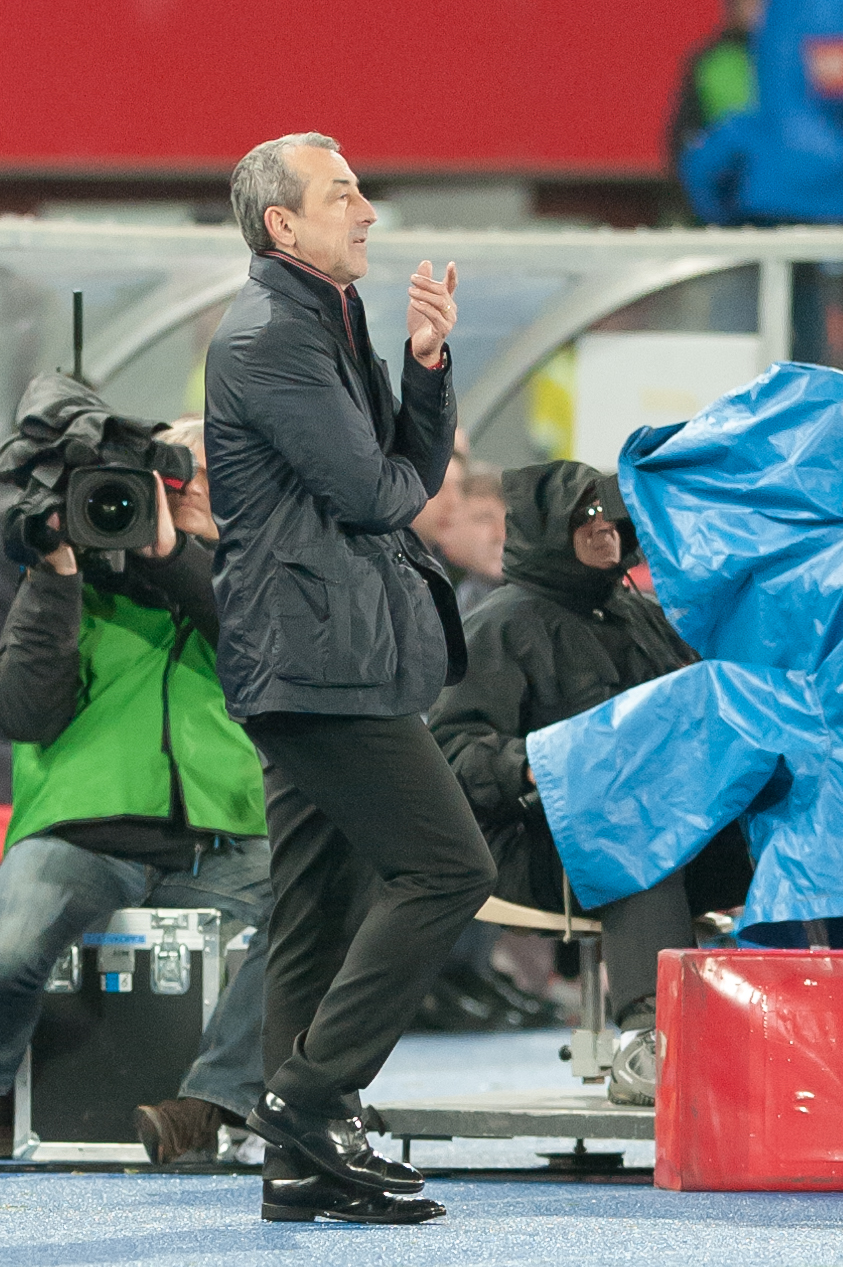
Baždarević managing Bosnia and Herzegovina in March 2015

On 13 December 2014, Baždarević was named head coach of the Bosnia and Herzegovina national team, beating Milovan Rajevac for the position. Among other candidates were Vahid Halilhodžić, Igor Štimac, and Felix Magath. He replaced Safet Sušić, who was sacked by N/FSBiH due to a run of poor results in the UEFA Euro 2016 qualifying having only taken two points in four matches. Bosnia and Herzegovina improved considerably under Baždarević and reached the play-off stage for Euro 2016, where they were unfortunately eliminated by the Republic of Ireland with a 3–1 aggregate score. In the aftermath, Miroslav "Ćiro" Blažević, former national team head coach and successful manager, blamed Baždarević for Bosnia's elimination against the Republic of Ireland.

On 9 November 2015, the Bosnian FA extended the contract with Baždarević till after the 2018 FIFA World Cup qualifier campaign. He won his first managerial trophy with Bosnia and Herzegovina after beating Japan 2–1 in the 2016 Kirin Cup final.

After not qualifying for the 2018 FIFA World Cup, Baždarević's contract expired and shortly after was left of his duties as the head coach after three years in charge.

=== Paris FC ===
On 15 June 2018, Baždarević was named manager of Ligue 2 club Paris FC on a two-year contract. In his first season, the French team finished on a good 4th place. However, on 30 December 2019, Baždarević was sacked due to poor results in the following season.

=== Guingamp ===
On 30 August 2020, Baždarević was hired as the new manager of Guingamp until 2022. On 1 February 2021, he terminated his contract with the club due to poor results.

== Personal life ==
Baždarević's wife, Marina Baždarević, was born in Belgrade, Serbia. He met his wife in 1979 on an airplane from Japan going back to Belgrade. Nine months later, they met again on another flight from Tunisia to Belgrade and after the second meeting they started dating. Their daughter, Téa Baždarević, works as a journalist in France.

== Career statistics ==
=== International goals ===
Scores and results list Yugoslavia's goal tally first, score column indicates score after each Baždarević goal.

List of international goals scored by Mehmed Baždarević
No.	Date	Venue	Opponent	Score	Result	Competition
1	14 December 1983	Cardiff, Wales	Wales	1–1	1–1	UEFA Euro 1984 qualifying
2	20 October 1984	Leipzig, East Germany	East Germany	1–1	3–2	1986 FIFA World Cup qualification
3	14 September 1988	Oviedo, Spain	Spain	1–1	2–1	Friendly
4	14 November 1990	Copenhagen, Denmark	Denmark	1–0	2–0	UEFA Euro 1992 qualifying

== Managerial statistics ==
As of match played 30 January 2021

Managerial record by team and tenure
Team	Nat	From	To	Record				
Team	Nat	From	To	P	W	D	L	Win %
Istres	(France)	1 July 2003	9 January 2005	62	22	18	22	35.48
Étoile du Sahel	(Tunisia)	16 July 2005	12 April 2006	35	20	11	4	57.14
Al-Wakrah	(Qatar)	1 July 2006	30 June 2007	27	7	13	7	25.93
Grenoble	(France)	1 July 2007	5 September 2010	130	38	34	58	29.23
Sochaux	(France)	10 June 2011	6 March 2012	30	4	10	16	13.33
Al-Wakrah	(Qatar)	10 June 2012	3 June 2013	22	7	5	10	31.82
Bosnia and Herzegovina (Note: Due to a suspension of Baždarević for unsportsmanlike behaviour, assistant manager Stéphane Gilli took charge of the team on 25 March 2017.)	(Bosnia and Herzegovina)	13 December 2014	10 October 2017	25	14	5	6	56.00
Paris FC	(France)	15 June 2018	30 December 2019	65	25	17	23	38.46
Guingamp	(France)	30 August 2020	1 February 2021	21	4	9	8	19.05
Total				417	141	122	154	33.81

== Honours ==
=== Player ===
Sochaux

- Ligue 2: 1987–88 (Group A)

Yugoslavia

- Summer Olympics third place: 1984

=== Manager ===
Bosnia and Herzegovina

- Kirin Cup: 2016

Individual

- Ligue 2 Manager of the Year: 2004

== In popular culture ==
- Baždarević's international career is marked by an infamous incident of him spitting on Turkish referee Yusuf Namoğlu during a qualifying match for the 1990 FIFA World Cup, against Norway in Sarajevo. Baždarević received a 12-month ban from international competition, resulting in him missing the 1990 FIFA World Cup. Yugoslavia reached the quarter-finals at the tournament.
- Baždarević again missed a major tournament, this time the entire Yugoslav team was excluded from taking part in UEFA Euro 1992, having already qualified, because of UN sanctions due to the Yugoslav Wars. Denmark instead took their place and, ironically, won the 1992 championship. On 14 November 1990, Baždarević scored a goal against Denmark in Copenhagen during the qualification for the tournament.
- During the early 1990s, a Yugoslav sketch comedy TV show, Top lista nadrealista, made Baždarević a popular figure, due to the spitting incident on the Turkish referee.
