= Icham Mouissi =

Algerian footballer (born 1982)

Personal information
- Full name: Icham Mouissi
- Date of birth: 21 September 1982 (age 44)
- Place of birth: Roubaix, France
- Height: 1.74 m (5 ft 9 in)
- Position: Defender

Senior career*
Years	Team	Apps	(Gls)
2000–2002	Wasquehal	20	(0)
2002–2004	Racing Santander	1	(0)
2005	Barakaldo		
2005–2006	Wasquehal	10	(0)
2006	Gueugnon	2	(0)
2007	Wasquehal		
2008–2010	Tournai	52	(10)
2010	MC Alger	2	(0)
2010–2012	Tournai	28	(14)
2012–2013	Wasquehal	9	(1)
2013	Oudenaarde	9	(0)

International career^{‡}
2002–2003	Algeria U23	4	(0)
- * Club domestic league appearances and goals as of 14:35, 1 May 2013 (UTC) ‡ National team caps and goals as of 00:00, 28 March 2012 (UTC)

Icham Mouissi (born 21 September 1982) is a retired footballer who played as a defender. Born in France, he represented Algeria at under-23 international level.

== Club career ==
Mouissi made his La Liga debut on 21 June 2003.

In 2010, he signed for MC Alger.

On 16 December 2010, Mouissi left MC Alger and signed a contract with R.F.C. Tournai until 2013. He made just two appearances for MC Alger before leaving the club.

== International career ==
Although born in France, Mouissi played for Algeria at the Under-23 level. In 2009, it was reported that Rabah Saadane was considering calling-up him to the Algerian National Team, although that never materialized.
