= Yazid Kaïssi =

Moroccan footballer (born 1981)

Personal information
- Date of birth: 16 May 1981 (age 45)
- Place of birth: Montreuil, France
- Height: 1.76 m (5 ft 9 in)
- Position: Defensive midfielder

Senior career*
Years	Team	Apps	(Gls)
1999–2005	Lens	0	(0)
2001–2002	→ Wasquehal (loan)	8	(0)
2002	Panionios	5	(0)
2003	BK Häcken	?	(?)
2004–2009	Umm-Salal	?	(?)
2009–2010	Al-Karamah	13	(1)
2010–2011	Dubai Club	10	(1)
2011–2012	Wydad de Fès	7	(0)
2012–2013	Stade Marocain	?	(?)
2013–2016	Feignies Aulnoye		

International career
2002	Algeria U23	1	(0)
2004	Morocco U23	3	(1)
- * Club domestic league appearances and goals

Yazid Kaïssi (Arabic: يزيد قيسي; born 16 May 1981) is a former professional footballer. He last played for Feignies Aulnoye. Born in France, he represented both Algeria and Morocco at youth level.

== Club career ==
A youth prospect of Lens, Kaïssi played for the reserve team and was a finalist in the 2000–01 Championnat National 2. He also played on loan for ES Wasquehal in Ligue 2 during the 2001–02 season.

Kaïssi never made an official appearance for the Lens first team, and he therefore left the club in October 2004 to play one season at Greek club Panionios, making only a few appearances. After his stint in Greece, he played one season at BK Häcken in Sweden. He then moved to Qatari club Umm-Salal. After stints with Al-Karamah and Dubai Club, Kaïssi signed with Moroccan club Wydad de Fès in the summer of 2011. In the 2012–13 season, he played for Stade Marocain. Kaïssi played for Feignies Aulnoye between 2013 and 2016.

== International career ==
In 2002, Kaïssi was a member of the Algerian Under-23 National Team at the 2002 Palestine Solidarity Tournament in Yemen.

However, after that he opted to play for Morocco national football team and played for the senior national team at the 2002 Arab Nations Cup in Kuwait, appearing in three matches and scoring one goal.

Kaïssi was part of the 2004 Olympic Morocco national football team, which exited in the first round, finishing third in group D, behind group winners Iraq and runners-up Costa Rica.
