= Toño Rodríguez =

Mexican footballer (born 1992)

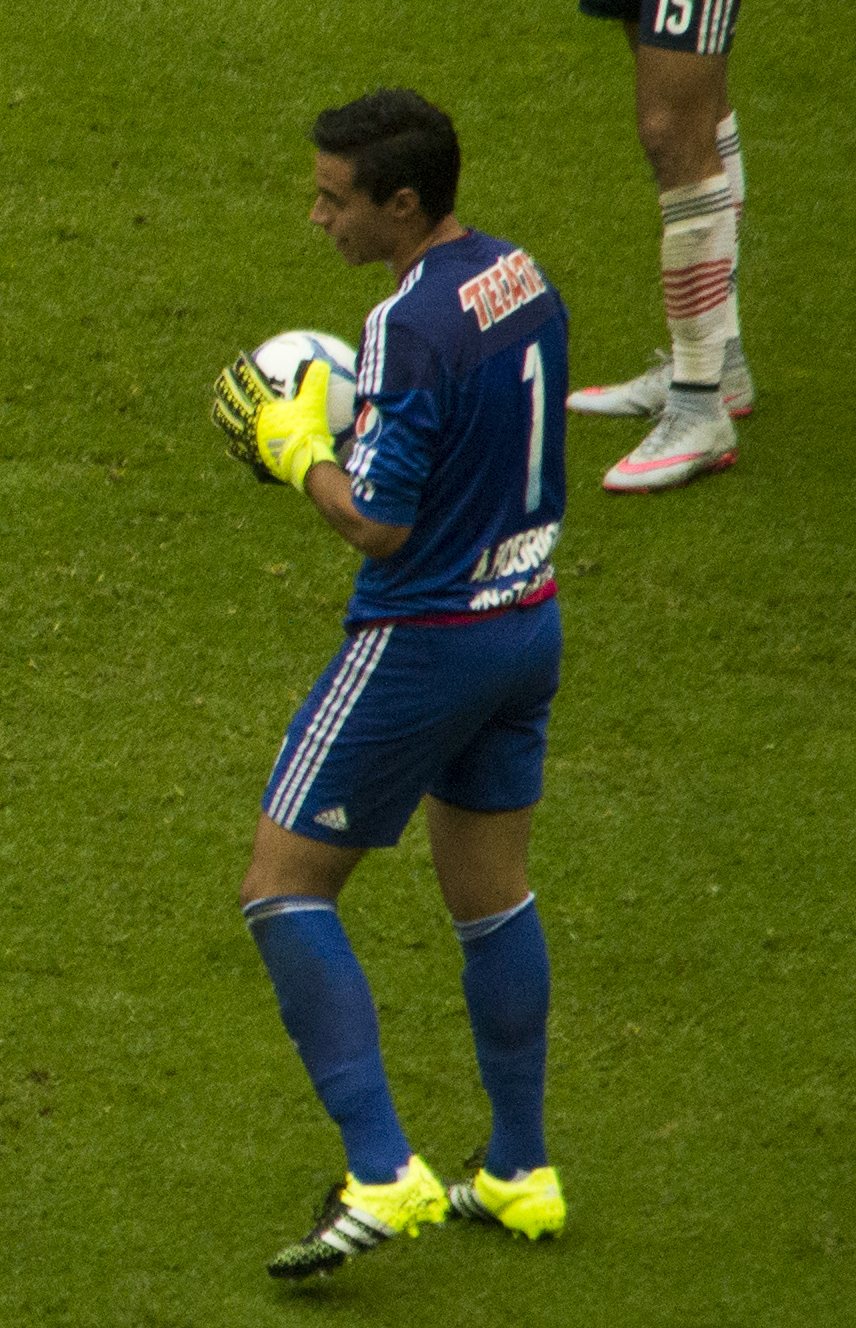
- Rodríguez with Guadalajara in 2015

Personal information
- Full name: José Antonio Rodríguez Romero
- Date of birth: 4 July 1992 (age 34)
- Place of birth: Guadalajara, Jalisco, Mexico
- Height: 1.86 m (6 ft 1 in)
- Position: Goalkeeper

Team information
- Current team: Tijuana
- Number: 2

Youth career
- 2008–2011: Guadalajara

Senior career*
| Years | Team | Apps | (Gls) |
| 2011–2023 | Guadalajara | 104 | (1) |
| 2011–2012 | → Veracruz (loan) | 21 | (0) |
| 2017 | → León (loan) | 0 | (0) |
| 2017 | → Tijuana (loan) | 0 | (0) |
| 2018–2019 | → BUAP (loan) | 32 | (0) |
| 2022 | → Queretaro (loan) | 9 | (0) |
| 2023 | → Tijuana (loan) | 17 | (0) |
| 2023– | Tijuana | 124 | (0) |

International career^{‡}
| 2009 | Mexico U17 | 7 | (0) |
| 2011 | Mexico U20 | 6 | (0) |
| 2012 | Mexico U23 | 2 | (0) |
| 2023 | Mexico | 2 | (0) |
Medal record
Men's football
Representing Mexico
CONCACAF Gold Cup
| Winner | 2023 United States–Canada | Team |
Summer Olympics
| Gold medal – first place | 2012 London | Team |
Olympic Qualifying Championship
| Winner | 2012 United States |
Toulon Tournament
| Winner | 2012 France | Team |
Pan American Games
| Gold medal – first place | 2011 Guadalajara | Team |
CONCACAF U-20 Championship
| Winner | 2011 | Team |
FIFA U-20 World Cup
| Third place | 2011 | Team |
- * Club domestic league appearances and goals as of 20 November 2026 ‡ National team caps and goals as of 16 December 2023

José Antonio "Toño" Rodríguez Romero (born 4 July 1992), is a Mexican professional footballer who plays as a goalkeeper for Liga MX club Tijuana. He is an Olympic gold medalist.

== Club career ==
Rodríguez started his career for Liga MX club Guadalajara, and made his debut on 6 April 2013 against Jaguares. In 2011, he was loaned to Veracruz for two seasons, and was the starting goalkeeper for the team. He returned to Guadalajara after two successful seasons with Veracruz, and became the starting goalkeeper of Guadalajara in 2014 after Luis Ernesto Michel was loaned to Saprissa of Costa Rica.

On 26 November 2019, Rodríguez scored a goal from inside his own box during Guadalajara's 3–1 win against Veracruz.

== International career ==
Rodríguez has represented Mexico in the U-17, U-20, and U-23 divisions, as well as the senior national team. He was among the squad that won the gold medal at the 2012 London Summer Olympics. In March 2023, Rodríguez received his first call-up to the senior national team by Diego Cocca, and made his debut on 7 June 2023, in a friendly match against Guatemala entering at halftime substituting Luis Malagón.

== Career statistics ==
=== International ===
As of match played on 16 December 2023

| National team | Year | Apps | Goals |
|---|---|---|---|
| Mexico | 2023 | 2 | 0 |
| Total | | 2 | 0 |

== Honours ==
Guadalajara

- Copa MX: Apertura 2015
- Supercopa MX: 2016
- CONCACAF Champions League: 2018

Mexico Youth

- CONCACAF U-20 Championship: 2011
- Pan American Games: 2011
- CONCACAF Olympic Qualifying Championship: 2012
- Toulon Tournament: 2012
- Olympic Gold Medal: 2012

Mexico

- CONCACAF Gold Cup: 2023
