= Karel Michlowsky =

Czech footballer and manager

Personal information
- Date of birth: 9 October 1918
- Place of birth: Lanštorf, Czechoslovakia
- Date of death: 11 December 1998 (aged 80)
- Position: Striker

Senior career*
Years	Team	Apps	(Gls)
- SK Bata Zlin
1947	Sochaux		
1947–1949	Angers		
1949–1951	Saint-Étienne		
1951–1956	Angers		

Managerial career
- 1953–1956: Angers
- 1957–1958: Lens
- 1959–1960: Nantes
- 1960–1962: Angers
- 1964–1966: AAJ Blois
- * Club domestic league appearances and goals

Karel Michlowsky (9 October 1918 – 11 December 1998) was a Czech footballer and football manager. He played for SK Bata Zlin, FC Sochaux-Montbéliard, Angers SCO and AS Saint-Étienne. After his playing career he became a coach in France. Michlowsky died in December 1998 at the age of 80.
