= Angers SCO =

Association football club in Angers, France

Angers
- Full name: Angers Sporting Club de l'Ouest
- Nicknames: Le SCO; Les Scoïstes; Les Noirs et Blancs (The Black and Whites)
- Short name: SCO
- Founded: 1919; 107 years ago
- Stadium: Stade Raymond Kopa
- Capacity: 18,752
- Owner: Chabane Family
- President: Romain Chabane
- Head coach: Stéphane Gilli
- League: Ligue 1
- 2025–26: Ligue 1, 13th of 18
- Website: angers-sco.fr
Home colours	Away colours

Angers Sporting Club de l'Ouest, commonly referred to as Angers SCO (French pronunciation: [ɑ̃ʒe]), is a French professional football club based in Angers in Pays de la Loire in western France. The club was founded in 1919 and plays in Ligue 1, the first division of Football in France. It plays its home matches at the Stade Raymond Kopa. The club has played 31 seasons in the French top flight.

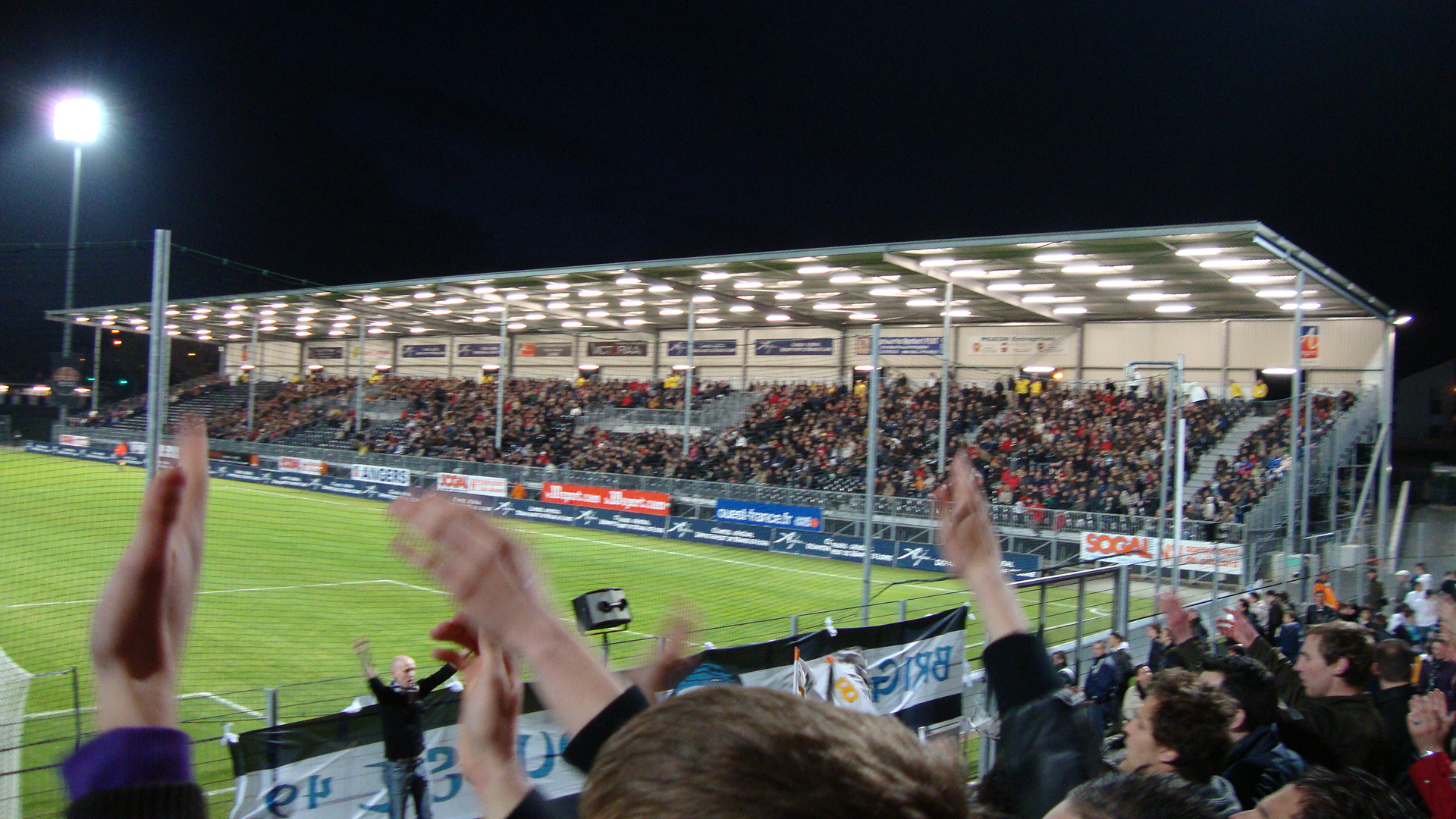
Angers SCO home stadium Stade Raymond Kopa.

== History ==
The team was founded in 1919, the same year the FFF was founded.

During the team's history, it has bounced between the top two tiers on multiple occasions. However, it did spend time in the third tier on several occasions; the 2006–07 season was its last season in the third tier.

The first season that Angers debuted in the French second division was in 1945. During this season, Angers SCO was placed in the North group; at that time, the second division was split into two groups, the North and South. Angers finished third, being seven points short of Stade Français, which was promoted to the first division. In the 2014–15 Ligue 2 season, the team achieved promotion after a long time being in the lower division. During the 2015–16 Ligue 1 season, SCO placed ninth in the final standings. In its opening league match against Montpellier, Angers won the match 2–0.

On 28 May 2017 Angers played in the 2017 Coupe de France final against Paris Saint-Germain. Angers lost the match 1–0 courtesy of 91st minute own goal. At the end of the 2017–18 Ligue 1 season, Angers finished 14th on the table and Cameroon striker Karl Toko Ekambi finished with an impressive 17 goals in the competition. In the 2018–19 Ligue 1 season, Angers finished in a respectable 13th position on the table.

On 8 June 2020, Angers broke their own transfer fee record by signing Paul Bernardoni from Bordeaux, in a deal worth 8 million euros. On 30 April 2021 Angers, along with Paris FC, were handed a transfer ban by FIFA for violation of regulations regarding relay transfers in August 2020. The ban was effective for the summer 2021 transfer window. On 27 April 2023, Angers received a two-window transfer ban from FIFA due to a dispute with Tunisian club ES Tunis over the transfer of Ilyes Chetti. Angers communicated their intent to appeal to the Court of Arbitration for Sport (CAS). In the 2022–23 Ligue 1 season, Angers suffered relegation with five matches to spare, returning to the second tier after eight years in the top flight. They were promoted back to Ligue 1 for the 2024-25 season.

== League participations ==
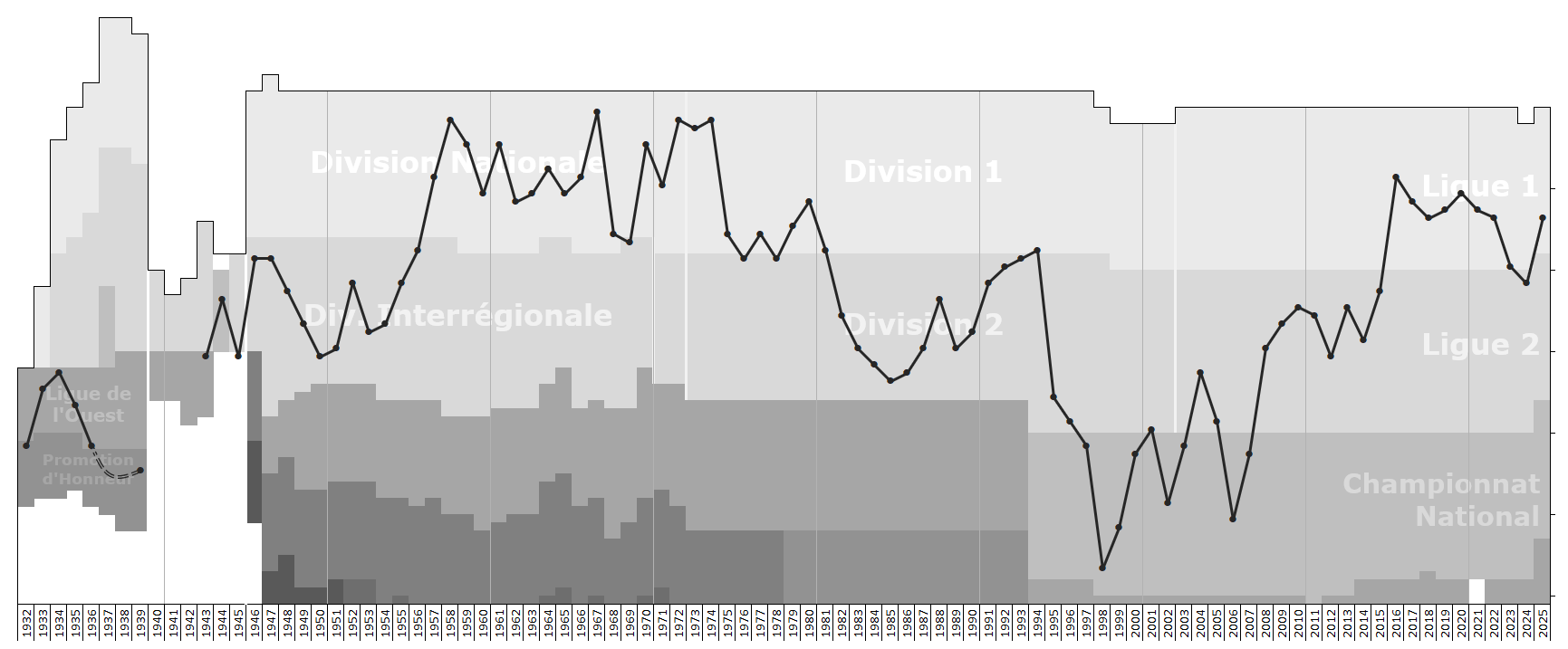
Historical league performance chart of Angers SCO

- Ligue 1: 1956–68, 1969–75, 1976–77, 1978–81, 1993–94, 2015–2023, 2024–present
- Ligue 2: 1945–56, 1968–69, 1975–76, 1977–78, 1981–93, 1994–96, 2000–01, 2003–05, 2007–15, 2023–24
- National: 1996–2000, 2001–03, 2005–07
- Regional League: 1931–39
- Division d'Honneur: 1919–31
- Coupe de France runners-up: 1957, 2017

== Players ==
=== Current squad ===
As of 8 September 2026

Note: Flags indicate national team as defined under FIFA eligibility rules; some limited exceptions apply. Players may hold more than one non-FIFA nationality.

No.	Pos.	Nation	Player
1	GK	POR	Anthony Lopes
2	DF	HAI	Carlens Arcus
4	DF	MLI	Ousmane Camara
6	MF	FRA	Louis Mouton
7	FW	CAF	Usman Simbakoli
8	MF	NED	Branco van den Boomen
9	FW	FRA	Prosper Peter
10	FW	MAR	Amine Sbaï
11	FW	CMR	Harouna Djibirin
14	MF	MAR	Yassin Belkhdim
16	GK	CGO	Melvin Zinga
17	DF	FRA	Joseph Kalulu

No.	Pos.	Nation	Player
18	FW	GAB	Jim Allevinah
19	FW	MAR	Amine El Ouazzani (on loan from Braga)
20	DF	FRA	Marius Louër
21	DF	MTN	Jordan Lefort
24	DF	FRA	Emmanuel Biumla
26	FW	FRA	Anthony Bermont (on loan from Lens)
27	DF	FRA	Lilian Raolisoa
34	DF	FRA	Maël Gernigon
36	MF	FRA	Bané Diatta
37	MF	FRA	Jules Bouffandeau
40	GK	MLI	Oumar Pona
93	MF	ALG	Haris Belkebla (captain)

=== Out on loan ===
Note: Flags indicate national team as defined under FIFA eligibility rules; some limited exceptions apply. Players may hold more than one non-FIFA nationality.

No.	Pos.	Nation	Player
—	DF	MLI	Dan Sinaté (at Amiens until 30 June 2027)
—	MF	FRA	Marius Courcoul (at RAAL La Louvière until 30 June 2027)

No.	Pos.	Nation	Player
—	FW	FRA	Lanroy Machine (at Heerenveen until 30 June 2027)

=== Youth team & Academy ===
Note: Flags indicate national team as defined under FIFA eligibility rules; some limited exceptions apply. Players may hold more than one non-FIFA nationality.

No.	Pos.	Nation	Player
34	MF	FRA	Amine Moussaoui
37	DF	FRA	Lionel Ngangué

No.	Pos.	Nation	Player
38	MF	FRA	Ilann Garin
41	MF	MAR	Jibril El Baraka

== Current technical staff ==
Position	Name
President	(France) Romain Chabane
Vice President	(France) Teddy Kefalas
Director of Sport	(France) Laurent Boissier
Manager	(France) Stéphane Gilli
Assistant manager	(France) Jean-Michel Badiane
Fitness coach	(France) Alan Berrou
Physiotherapists	(France) Antoine André (France) Aurélien Latour
Goalkeeping coach	(France) Olivier Tingry
Club doctor	(France) Claire de Labachelerie
Podologist	(France) Arnaud Perrier
Osteopath	(France) Marc Sourice

=== Notable players ===
Below are the notable former players who have represented Angers in league and international competition since the club's foundation in 1919. To appear in the section below, a player must have either played in at least 80 official matches for the club or represented his country's national team either while playing for Angers or after departing the club.

For a complete list of Angers SCO players, see Category:Angers SCO players

- (Cameroon) Paul Alo'o
- (Slovenia) Vili Ameršek
- (Socialist Federal Republic of Yugoslavia) Boško Antić
- (France) Jean-Marie Aubry
- (Tunisia) Fahid Ben Khalfallah
- (France) Marc Berdoll
- (France) Stéphane Bruey
- (France) Thierry Cygan
- (Socialist Federal Republic of Yugoslavia) Milan Damjanović
- (France) Cédric Daury
- (France) Jean-Pierre Dogliani
- (France) Jean-Marc Guillou
- (France) Kazimir Hnatow
- (Romania) Claudiu Keserü
- (France) Raymond Kopa
- (Socialist Federal Republic of Yugoslavia) Vladica Kovačević
- (France) Guy Moussi
- (Italy) Albert Poli
- (France) Ulrich Ramé
- (Algeria) Amar Rouaï
- (Romania) Emil Săndoi
- (France) Steve Savidan
- (France) Jules Sbroglia
- (France) André Strappe
- (Cameroon) Karl Toko Ekambi
- (France) Jean Vincent

== Managers ==
- (France) Georges Meuris (1942–47)
- (France) (Hungary) André Simonyi (1947)
- (France) Camille Cottin (1948–51)
- (France) Jean Grégoire (1951–53)
- (Czechoslovakia) Karel Michlowsky (1953–56)
- (Austria) (France) Walter Presch (1956–57)
- (France) Maurice Blondel (1957–60)
- (Czechoslovakia) Karel Michlowsky (1960–62)
- (France) Antoine Pasquini (1962–68)
- (France) Louis Hon (1968–69)
- (France) Lucien Leduc (1969–70)
- (France) Ladislas Nagy (1970–73)
- (Argentina) (France) César "Pancho" Gonzales (1973–74)
- (Serbia) Velibor Vasović (1974–76)
- (France) Aimé Mignot (1976–79)
- (France) Élie Fruchart (1979–81)
- (France) René Cédolin (1981)
- (France) Élie Fruchart (1981–83)
- (France) Christian Letort (1983–84)
- (France) Henri Atamaniuk (1984–87)
- (France) Pierre Garcia (1987–88)
- (France) Hervé Gauthier (1988–93)
- (France) Alain de Martigny (1993–94)
- (France) André Guesdon (1994–95)
- (France) Bruno Steck (1995)
- (France) André Guesdon (1995–97)
- (France) Jean-Marc Mezenge (1997)
- (France) Jean-Yves Chay (1997)
- (France) Jean-Marc Mezenge (1997–98)
- (France) Gustavo Silva (1998)
- (France) Christian Dupont (1998–99)
- (France) Denis Goavec (1999–01)
- (France) Stéphane Mottin (Jan 2001–02)
- (France) Éric Guérit (2002–03)
- (France) Jacky Bonnevay (2003–04)
- (France) Noël Tosi (Feb 2004–04)
- (Switzerland) Roberto Morinini (July 2004–04)
- (France) Noël Tosi (Aug 2004–05)
- (France) Stéphane Paille (July 2005 – Jan 06)
- (France) Jean-Pascal Beaufreton (Jan 2006)
- (France) Jean-Louis Garcia (June 2006–11)
- (France) Stéphane Moulin (2011–21)
- (France) Gérald Baticle (2021–22)
- (France) Abdel Bouhazama (2023)
- (France) Alexandre Dujeux (2023–2026)
- (France) Stéphane Gilli (2026–present)
