= Claidel Kohinor =

Surinamese footballer

Personal information
- Date of birth: 7 February 1992 (age 34)
- Place of birth: Paramaribo, Suriname
- Height: 1.90 m (6 ft 3 in)
- Position: Goalkeeper

Team information
- Current team: Robinhood

Senior career*
Years	Team	Apps	(Gls)
2010–2014	Leo Victor		
2014–2016	Notch		
2016–	Robinhood	12+	(3+)

International career^{‡}
2011	Suriname U20	2	(0)
2016–	Suriname	22	(1)
- * Club domestic league appearances and goals ‡ National team caps and goals as of 22 May 2022

Claidel Kohinor (born 7 February 1992) is a Surinamese footballer who plays as a goalkeeper for Surinamese club Robinhood and the Suriname national team.

== Club career ==
Kohinor played for Leo Victor and Notch before moving to Robinhood. Kohinor was named as goalkeeper of the week after a game against AS Capoise in the 2019 CONCACAF League.

== International career ==
In 2011, he was named in the Suriname team for the CONCACAF U-20 Championship. Being the second goalkeeper of Suriname senior team he got the chance to prove himself in international friendly matches against Guyana and French Guiana in February 2016. Showing potential and being in good form he got the chance to play in the 2017 Caribbean Cup qualification. He started in the 1st match of round one against Guadeloupe a match that ended in a draw. Suriname lost in the penalty shootout, in this match he was one of the penalty takers in the shootout and ended up missing the shot. He didn't get to play the second match, but did get to play in both matches of the second round against Saint Kitts and Nevis and Saint Vincent and the Grenadines.

In June 2021, Kohinor was named to the Suriname squad for the 2021 CONCACAF Gold Cup.
