= Julien Gibert (footballer, born 1976) =

French footballer

Personal information
- Date of birth: 15 June 1976 (age 50)
- Place of birth: Lunel-Viel, France
- Height: 1.75 m (5 ft 9 in)
- Position: Goalkeeper

Team information
- Current team: ES Fréjus

Senior career*
Years	Team	Apps	(Gls)
2000–2002	Gallia Club Lunel		
2002–2003	ES Wasquehal	26	(0)
2003–2008	FC Martigues		
2008–2009	SC Port-la-Nouvelle		
2009–	ES Fréjus		
- * Club domestic league appearances and goals as of 19:36, 17 November 2009 (UTC)

Julien Gibert (born 15 June 1976 in Lunel-Viel) is a French professional football player. Currently, he plays in the Championnat National for Étoile Fréjus Saint-Raphaël.

He played on the professional level in Ligue 2 for ES Wasquehal. A goalkeeper, Gibert was captain of FC Martigues playing squad during 2008.
