= Élie Fruchart =

French football manager (1922–2003)

Personal information
- Date of birth: 8 July 1922
- Place of birth: Calonne-Ricouart, France
- Date of death: 1 July 2003 (aged 80)
- Position: Goalkeeper

Senior career*
Years	Team	Apps	(Gls)
- US Auchel

Managerial career
- 1948–1962: US Auchel
- 1962–1969: Lens
- 1969–1972: Reims
- 1972–1979: Dunkerque
- 1979–1981: Angers
- 1981–1983: Angers
- * Club domestic league appearances and goals

Élie Fruchart (8 July 1922 – 1 July 2003) was a French football player and manager. He played as a goalkeeper for US Auchel. He managed US Auchel, RC Lens, Stade de Reims, USL Dunkerque and Angers SCO.
