= Angoulême Charente FC =

French football club

Angoulême
- Full name: Angoulême Charente Football Club
- Founded: 1920; 106 years ago
- Ground: Stade Camille-Lebon
- Capacity: 6,500
- Chairman: Patrick Triaud
- Manager: David Giguel
- League: National 1 Group B
- 2022–23: National 2 Group D, 4th
- Website: https://acfcfootball.net
Home colours	Away colours

Angoulême Charente Football Club, commonly known as Angoulême, is a French football club from the city of Angoulême, currently playing in Championnat National 1. Founded in 1920 as SC Angoulême, the club is well known as AS Angoulême, a name the club bore from 1948 to 1992. It was renamed AS Angoulême Charente 92 in 1992. In 2005, they rebranded as Angoulême Charente FC.

== History ==
The club was founded in 1920. In 1969, Angoulême was promoted to the French Division 1. In their first season in the elite, the club finished in a surprising fourth place in the 1969–70 season. Due to their high placement, Angoulême were invited to compete in the 1970–71 Inter-Cities Fairs Cup. Their opponent in the tournament was Portuguese side Vitória S.C. Angoulême lost the first game 3–0 away, and won 3–1 at home, suffering elimination. Next season, the club finished in 16th place, avoiding relegation by a single point. In the 1971–72 season, Angoulême finished in last place, suffering relegation to Division 2. Angoulême never returned to the top tier of French football, and currently competes in the fourth level of French football.

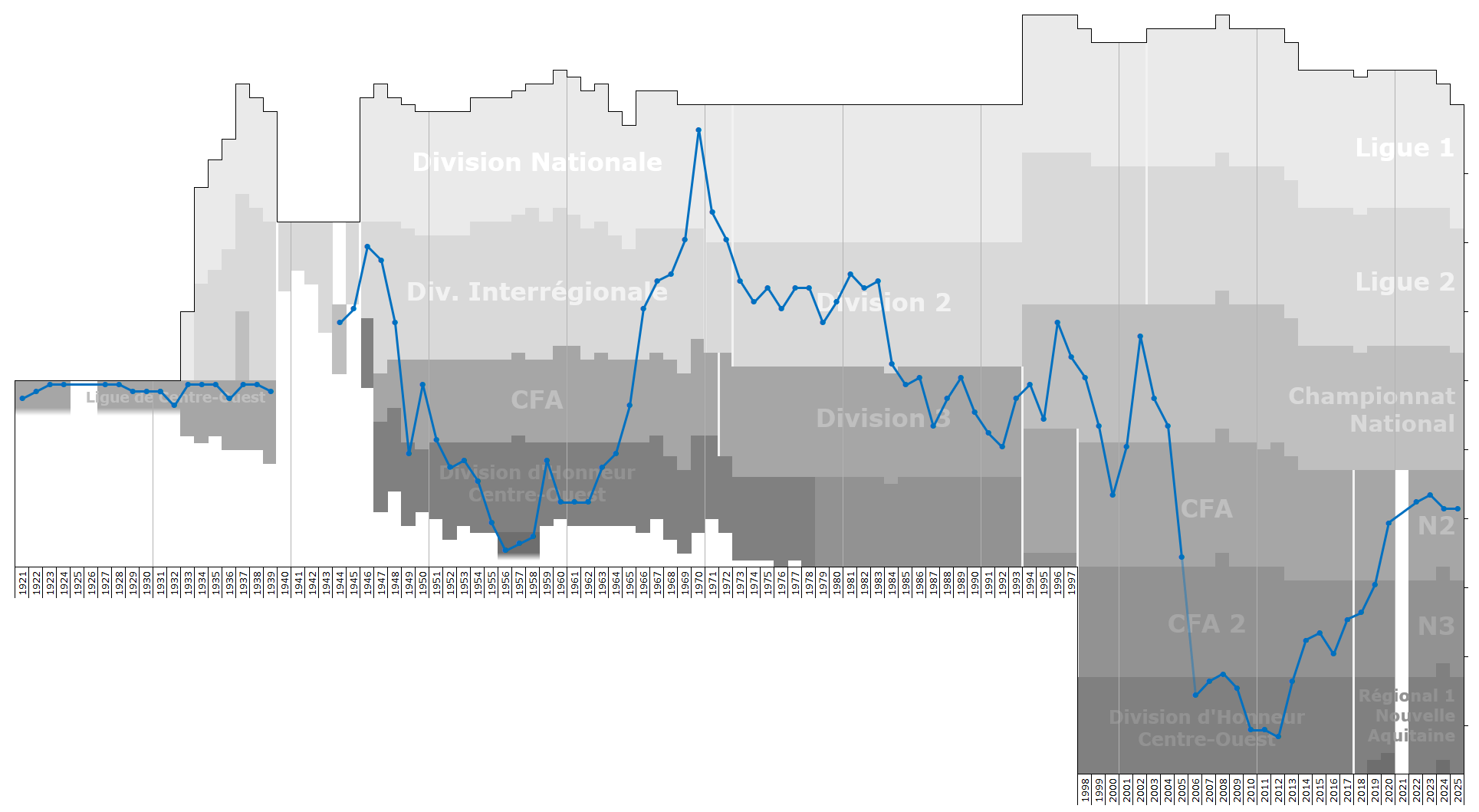
Historical league performance chart of Angoulême Charente FC

== Current squad ==
As of 10 April, 2026

Note: Flags indicate national team as defined under FIFA eligibility rules; some limited exceptions apply. Players may hold more than one non-FIFA nationality.

No.	Pos.	Nation	Player
5	DF	MAR	Mohamed Hamdi
6	MF	FRA	Mahamadou Diarra
7	MF	FRA	Ahmed Majid
8	FW	FRA	Paul Méliande
9	FW	FRA	Anthony Castera
10	MF	FRA	Victor Elissalt
11	FW	FRA	Kylian Sila
16	GK	FRA	Patrick Sintcheu
17	MF	FRA	Mouhamadou Sacko
18	DF	FRA	Lucas Llort
19	MF	FRA	Salim Jabi
20	FW	FRA	Lucas Makan

No.	Pos.	Nation	Player
21	DF	BEN	Maël Sedagondji
22	FW	FRA	Joe-Loïc Affamah
23	MF	FRA	Ibrahima Diaby
24	FW	FRA	Romain Escarpit
25	DF	FRA	Tobias Woum Woum
26	DF	FRA	Théo Chauvier
27	DF	FRA	Mamadou Kamissoko
28	MF	FRA	Thomas Dasquet
29	MF	FRA	Gatien Foll
30	GK	FRA	Alexis Mignonneaud
31	FW	FRA	Alexy Sénac

== Notable players ==
- (France) Ibrahima Diallo (youth)

== Managerial history ==
- Robert Lacoste (1945–1947)
- Coldeboeuf (1947–1949)
- Puchalt
- Friedman
- Lamaud
- Dupouy
- Lambertus De Harder (1957–1960)
- Joseph Ibanez (1960–1965)
- Angelo Grizzetti (1965–1966)
- Jacques Favre (1966–1968)
- Pierre Phelipon (1968–1969)
- Yvon Goujon and Mohamed Lekkak (1969–1970)
- Claude Hugues (1970 – May 1971)
- Angelo Grizzetti (May 1971 – 1972)
- Yvon Goujon (1972 – November 1973)
- Henri Skiba (November 1973 – 1977)
- Paul Lévin (1977–1983)
- Mohamed Lekkak (1983 – October 1983)
- Robert Salun (October 1983 – 1984)
- Guy Latapie (1984–1987)
- Ángel Bargas (1987–1991)
- Patrick Duvoid (1991 – October 1991)
- Andrzej Szarmach (October 1991 – April 1995)
- Guy Latapie (April 1995 – March 1997)
- Éric Guérit (March 1997 – December 1998)
- Patrice Neveu (December 1998 – 1999)
- Christian Letard (1999 – January 2001)
- Hervé Goursat (January 2001 – 2003)
- Pascal Chavroche (2003 – August 2003)
- Yannick Plissoneau (August 2003 – October 2003)
- Patrice Lair (October 2003 – February 2004)
- Éric Guérit (February 2004 – 2005)
- Nicolas Bastère (June 2005 – February 2008)
- Jean-Claude Chemier (February 2008 – March 2008)
- Laurent Dauriac (July 2008 – June 2009)
- Jean-Jacques Eydelie (July 2009 – June 2010)
- Jean-Pierre Bernard (July 2010 – April 2011)
- Johann Dumais – Gilles Crapoulet (April 2011 – 2012)
- Christophe Forest – Johann Dumais (since 2012)
