= Guillaume Benon =

French footballer (born 1975)

Personal information
- Date of birth: 16 May 1975 (age 51)
- Place of birth: Croix, France
- Height: 1.87 m (6 ft 2 in)
- Position: Defender

Senior career*
Years	Team	Apps	(Gls)
1996–2003	ES Wasquehal	195	(4)
2003–2006	Dijon		
2006–2008	FC Sète		
2008–2010	USL Dunkerque		
2010–2011	ES Wasquehal		
- * Club domestic league appearances and goals

Guillaume Benon (born 16 May 1975) is a French former professional footballer who played as a defender in Ligue 2 for six seasons with Wasquehal and two seasons with Dijon. (Note: Guillaume Benon at WorldFootball.net)
