= Fabrice Correia =

French footballer and coach (born 1979)

Personal information
- Date of birth: March 15, 1979 (age 47)
- Place of birth: Le Creusot, France
- Height: 1.78 m (5 ft 10 in)
- Position: Defender

Team information
- Current team: Montceau Bourgogne (youth coach)

Senior career*
Years	Team	Apps	(Gls)
1996–2000	FC Gueugnon	23	(0)
1999	→ AS Beauvais (loan)	3	(0)
2000–2003	ES Wasquehal	77	(1)
2003–2012	Montceau Bourgogne		
2014–2016	USC Paray Foot		

Managerial career
- 2016–: Montceau Bourgogne (youth)
- * Club domestic league appearances and goals

Fabrice Correia (born March 15, 1979) is a French football coach and retired professional football player. Currently, he works as a youth coach for Montceau Bourgogne.

He played at the professional level in Ligue 2 for FC Gueugnon, AS Beauvais Oise and ES Wasquehal.
