= Stéphane Gilli =

French footballer and football manager (born 1974)

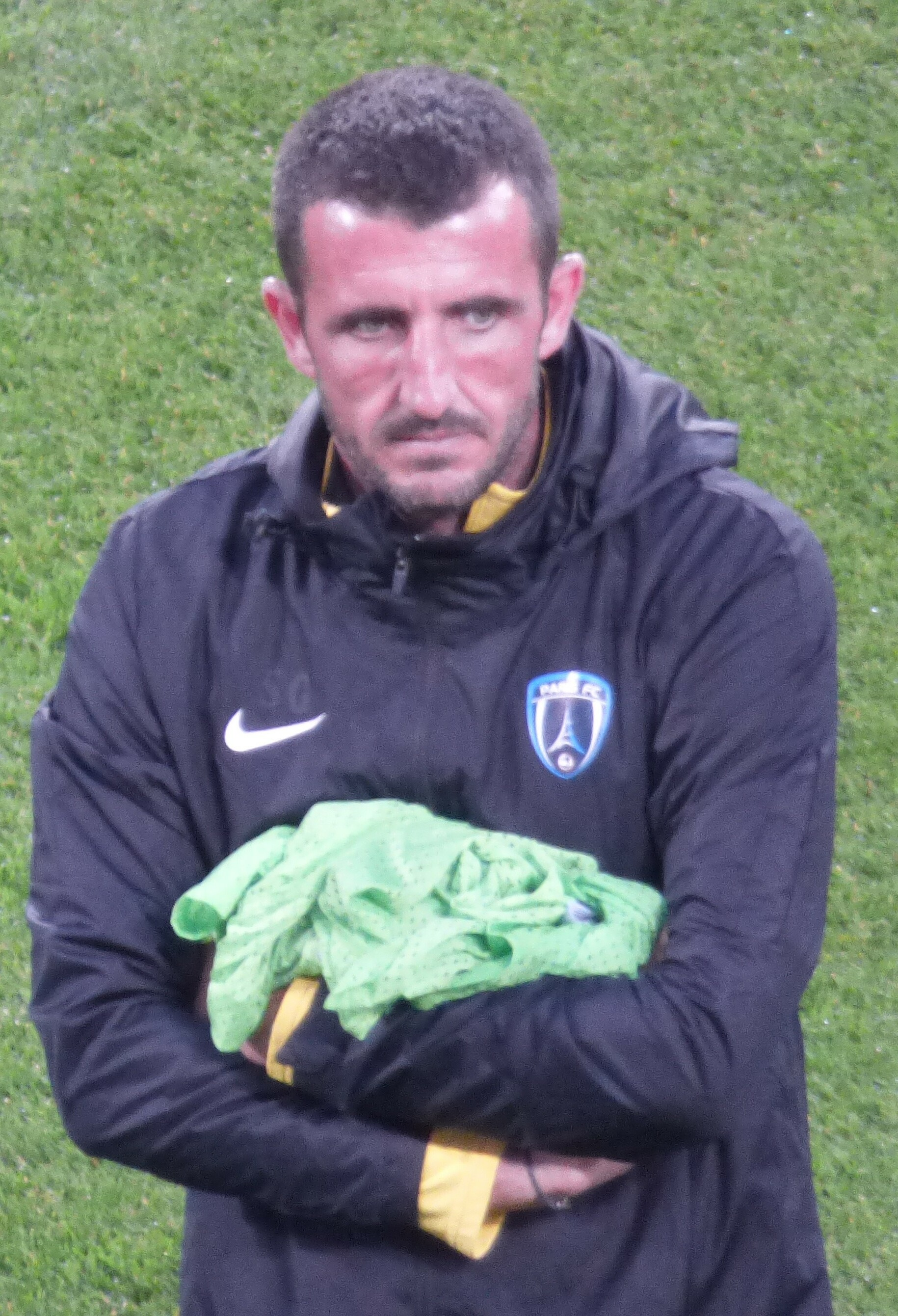
- Gilli with Paris FC in 2018

Personal information
- Date of birth: 30 April 1974 (age 52)
- Place of birth: Ganges, France
- Height: 1.84 m (6 ft 0 in)
- Position: Defender

Team information
- Current team: Angers (manager)

Senior career*
Years	Team	Apps	(Gls)
1995–1997	Nîmes B		
1997–1999	Vergèze		
1999–2001	Lunel		

Managerial career
- 2019–2020: Paris FC (interim)
- 2023–2026: Paris FC
- 2026–: Angers
- * Club domestic league appearances and goals

Stéphane Gilli (born 30 April 1974) is a French professional football manager and former player who played as a defender. He is currently the manager of Ligue 1 club Angers.

== Managerial career ==
Gilli had a career as a semi-amateur footballer, before working as a physical therapist after a bad injury. In that role, he worked with CS Sfaxien, Nîmes and Fulham.

In 2003, he started working as the long-term assistant manager to Mehmed Baždarević, with whom he stayed for 17 years. He followed Baždarević as assistant at Istres, ESS, Al-Wakrah, Grenoble, Sochaux, the Bosnia and Herzegovina national team. He managed Bosnia and Herzegovina for a game against Gibraltar in March 2017 after Baždarević was suspended for unsportsmanlike behaviour. He was terminated from Bosnia and Herzegovina, after knocking the tooth out of the Greek player Giannis Gianniotas during a brawl after the whistle after a 0-0 2018 FIFA World Cup qualification draw with Greece on 9 June 2017.

In 2018, he joined Baždarević again at the French club Paris FC. After Baždarević was sacked on 30 December 2019, Gilli was appointed as the interim manager. In 2020, René Girard was appointed as manager, and Gilli then shifted to his assistant. From 2020 to 2022, he was appointed as the assistant manager for Vahid Halilhodžić during his stint with the Morocco national team.

On 3 June 2023, he was formally appointed the manager of Paris FC in Ligue 2. He led the club to promotion to Ligue 1 after finishing second in the second division, marking their first return to the top flight in 46 years. He was dismissed on 22 February 2026 following a run of poor results.

On 9 June 2026, Gilli was named as the manager of Ligue 1 side Angers.

== Managerial statistics ==
As of match played 22 November 2026

Managerial record by team and tenure
Team	From	To	Record				
Team	From	To	P	W	D	L	Win %
Paris FC (caretaker)	30 December 2019	6 January 2020	1	1	0	0	100.00
Paris FC	1 July 2023	22 February 2026	104	46	28	30	44.23
Angers	9 June 2026	present	11	2	2	7	18.18
Career total			116	49	30	37	42.24
