= Angelo Grizzetti =

Italian footballer and coach (1916-1998)

Personal information
- Date of birth: May 14, 1916
- Place of birth: Vedano Olona, Italy
- Date of death: December 20, 1998 (aged 82)
- Position: Midfielder

Senior career*
Years	Team	Apps	(Gls)
–1944	Sochaux		
1944–1945	RC Paris	17	(0)
1945–1947	Angoulême		
1947–1950	RC Paris	56	(0)
1950–1952	CA Paris	45	(1)

Managerial career
- 1952–1953: Monaco
- 1955–1956: Red Star
- 1961–1963: CA Paris
- 1965–1966: Angoulême
- 1966–1967: Boulogne
- 1969–1970: Racing Paris-Neuilly
- 1971–1972: Angoulême
- * Club domestic league appearances and goals

Angelo Grizzetti (14 May 1916 – 20 December 1998) was an Italian footballer and coach.

He played for Sochaux, RC Paris, Angoulême and CA Paris.

After his playing career, he became a coach with Monaco, Red Star, CA Paris, Angoulême and Racing Paris-Neuilly.

== External links and references ==
- Barreaud, Marc (1998). Dictionnaire des footballeurs étrangers du championnat professionnel français (1932-1997). L'Harmattan, Paris. ISBN 2-7384-6608-7.
- Angelo Grizzetti at L'Équipe Football (in French)
