= Victor Elissalt =

French footballer (born 1991)

Personal information
- Date of birth: 23 November 1991 (age 34)
- Place of birth: Mont-de-Marsan, France
- Height: 1.80 m (5 ft 11 in)
- Position: Midfielder

Team information
- Current team: Angoulême
- Number: 10

Youth career
- 2009–2011: Stade Montois

Senior career*
Years	Team	Apps	(Gls)
2011–2014	Stade Montois	83	(17)
2014–2015	Martigues	30	(7)
2015–2016	Bayonne	15	(1)
2016–2017	Stade Montois	30	(7)
2017–2020	Béziers	47	(3)
2018–2019	→ Le Mans (loan)	9	(0)
2019	→ Le Mans B (loan)	5	(0)
2019–2020	Béziers B	3	(0)
2020–2024	Bergerac	83	(5)
2024–	Angoulême	40	(3)
- * Club domestic league appearances and goals as of 4 December 2025

Victor Elissalt (born 23 November 1991) is a French professional footballer who plays as a midfielder for Championnat National 1 club Angoulême.

== Career ==
Elissalt made his professional debut with Béziers in a 1–1 (6–5) shootout loss in the Coupe de la Ligue to Orléans on 14 August 2018.

In November 2018, Elissalt joined Le Mans of the Championnat National on loan until the end of the season.
