= William Loko =

French footballer (born 1972)

Personal information
- Full name: William Loko
- Date of birth: February 5, 1972 (age 54)
- Place of birth: Sully-sur-Loire, France
- Height: 1.74 m (5 ft 8 1/2 in)
- Position: Striker

Senior career*
Years	Team	Apps	(Gls)
1990–1992	Reims	2	(0)
1992–1996	Chamois Niortais	97	(6)
1996–1998	Wasquehal	73	(25)
1998–1999	Caen	32	(4)
1999–2000	Valence	33	(5)
2000–2002	Wasquehal	33	(10)
- * Club domestic league appearances and goals

William Loko (born February 5, 1972) is a former professional footballer who played as a striker.
