= Steve Bizasène =

Guadeloupean footballer and manager (born 1970)

Personal information
- Date of birth: 24 April 1970 (age 56)
- Place of birth: Pointe-à-Pitre, Guadeloupe
- Height: 1.72 m (5 ft 8 in)
- Position: Midfielder

Senior career*
| Years | Team | Apps | (Gls) |
| 1991–1998 | AS Beauvais | 115 | (7) |
| 1998–2002 | ES Wasquehal | 129 | (7) |
| 2002–2007 | US Lesquin | | |

International career
| 2006–2008 | Guadeloupe | 8 | (1) |

Managerial career
- –2012: Guadeloupe U-20
- 2012–2017: Guadeloupe
- * Club domestic league appearances and goals

Steve Bizasène (born 24 April 1970) is a Guadeloupean professional football player and manager.

In 1991, he began his career for the AS Beauvais. In Summer 1998 he transferred to the ES Wasquehal. In July 2002 he moved to US Lesquin.

In 2006, he made his debut for the Guadeloupe national football team.

Since September 2012 he is a head coach of the Guadeloupe national football team.

== International career ==
=== International goals ===
Scores and results list Guadeloupe's goal tally first.

| No | Date | Venue | Opponent | Score | Result | Competition |
|---|---|---|---|---|---|---|
| 1. | 14 January 2007 | Manny Ramjohn Stadium, Marabella, Trinidad and Tobago | Cuba | 1–0 | 2–1 | 2007 Caribbean Cup |
