= Éric Guérit =

French footballer and manager (born 1964)

Personal information
- Date of birth: 21 July 1964 (age 62)
- Place of birth: Niort, France
- Height: 1.77 m (5 ft 9 1/2 in)
- Position: Defensive midfielder

Senior career*
Years	Team	Apps	(Gls)
1981–1982	Angoulême	1	(0)
1982–1984	Chamois Niortais	?	(?)
1984–1986	Angoulême	60	(5)
1986–1989	Nice	96	(6)
1989–1990	Monaco	13	(0)
1990–1992	Cannes	65	(5)
1992–1995	Bordeaux	66	(0)

Managerial career
- 1995: Bordeaux
- 1997–1998: Angoulême
- 1999–2002: Lille B
- 2002–2003: Angers
- 2004–2005: Angoulême
- * Club domestic league appearances and goals

Éric Guérit (born 21 July 1964) is a French former professional football player and manager. A defensive midfielder by trade, he made more than 300 senior appearances for seven different clubs during a 14-year playing career spent mostly in the top division of French football. He later went into management, firstly as manager of Bordeaux in 1995, and has since held various positions at a number of clubs in France.

== Playing career ==
Born in Niort in the west of France, Guérit played for several clubs around the Deux-Sèvres department as a youth, including Brûlain and ASPTT Niort. He began his senior career with Angoulême and broke into the first team during the 1981–82 campaign, making his debut in Division 2. However, he was released by the club at the end of the season and subsequently moved into amateur football with Division 4 side Chamois Niortais. He spent two seasons with his home-town club, helping the team to a finish fourth in 1983 before securing promotion to the third tier the following year after a third-placed finish.

In the summer of 1984, Guérit returned to his first club Angoulême. The team had been relegated to Division 3 that year after finishing second-bottom of their group the previous season. Angoulême narrowly missed out on promotion twice over the following two years, ending the campaign in third place in 1985 before finishing as runners-up to Bourges a year later. Guérit was ever-present for the senior team during this period, scoring five goals in 60 league matches. His performances led to interest from clubs at higher levels and in 1986 he was signed by Division 1 side OGC Nice. Over the next three years, he became a regular in the Nice midfield, making 96 league appearances for the club and scoring on six occasions.

Guérit began the 1989–90 season with Nice, playing in the opening three matches, but transferred to nearby rivals Monaco in August 1989. He found his opportunities more limited and was restricted to only 13 games as the club challenged for the title, eventually finishing third, seven points behind champions Marseille. Guérit left Monaco ahead of the 1990–91 campaign, instead opting to sign for Cannes. He played 35 times in his first season with the south-coast outfit, scoring four goals as the team secured a fourth-place finish in Division 1. However, the following campaign was rather less successful for Cannes as they ended the year in 19th position, thereby being relegated to the second tier. Guérit nevertheless remained in the top division, joining Bordeaux in the summer of 1992. He went on to spend three years at the Parc Lescure, making a total of 66 league appearances for Bordeaux before announcing his retirement from football in 1995.

== Managerial career ==
In April 1995, following his retirement from playing, Guérit was hired as Bordeaux manager for the remainder of the season following the departure of Portuguese coach Toni. He guided the team to a seventh-place finish, winning five and drawing one of his eight matches in charge. However, he was not given the job on a permanent basis as the club hired Serbian Slavoljub Muslin as manager for the following season. Guérit left Bordeaux and returned for a third spell at his former side Angoulême, as assistant manager to Guy Latapie. When Latapie left the club in March 1997, Guérit was installed as head coach, a position he held until December of the following year.

After a short spell as assistant manager to Patrice Neveu at Angoulême, Guérit was hired as manager of the reserve team at Lille in 1999. He spent three years in the job, and his time at Lille culminated in the team winning the Championnat de France amateur (CFA) Group A at the end of the 2001–02 season. Shortly afterwards, he was appointed manager at Championnat National side Angers. He guided the team to promotion in his first season in charge, ending the campaign as runners-up to Besançon and thereby returning the club to the second tier after two years in the National. His stay at Angers did not last much longer, however, as he was dismissed and replaced by Jacky Bonnevay in August 2003 after winning only one of the opening five matches of the 2003–04 season.

A second stint as Angoulême manager followed, but he left the post in the summer of 2005 after a disappointing season which saw the club finish 17th in the CFA Group D and consequently drop into the Division d'Honneur, the sixth tier of French football, for the first time since 1964. In 2007, he joined Ligue 1 side Stade Rennais as a scout, a position he still holds as of May 2013.

== Personal life ==
Guérit is one of two brothers to have played professional football; his younger brother Fabrice played 24 matches as a defender for Chamois Niortais between 1991 and 1993.

== Honours ==
Lille B

- Championnat de France amateur Group A winners: 2001–02
