= Stéphane Capiaux =

French footballer (born 1969)

Personal information
- Full name: Stéphane Capiaux
- Date of birth: 5 June 1969 (age 57)
- Place of birth: Lille, France
- Height: 1.76 m (5 ft 9 1/2 in)
- Position: Midfielder

Senior career*
Years	Team	Apps	(Gls)
1992–1994	Wasquehal	41	(9)
1994–1998	Nancy	123	(5)
1998–1999	Laval	11	(0)
1999–2000	Chamois Niortais	17	(0)
2000–2002	Wasquehal	41	(2)
2002–2004	Changé	?	(?)
2004–2005	Wasquehal	16	(1)
- * Club domestic league appearances and goals

Stéphane Capiaux (born 5 June 1969) is a former professional footballer. He played as a midfielder.
