= Abdelmajid Oulmers =

Moroccan footballer

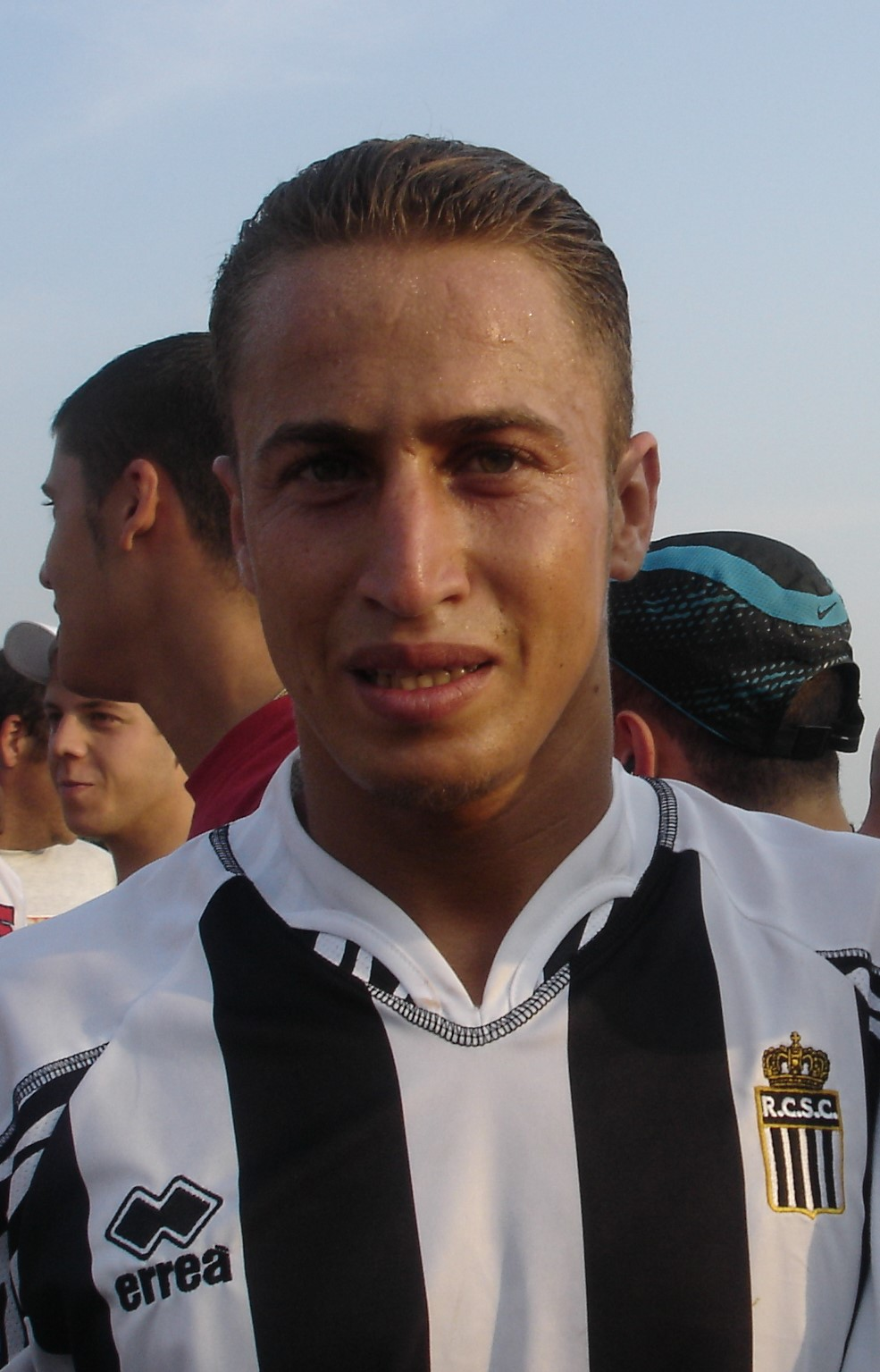

Personal information
- Date of birth: 12 September 1978 (age 48)
- Place of birth: Sidi-Bouali, Morocco
- Height: 1.74 m (5 ft 8 1/2 in)
- Position: Midfielder

Senior career*
Years	Team	Apps	(Gls)
1998–1999	Racing Besançon	19	(3)
1999–2003	Lens B	31	(9)
2000–2002	→ ES Wasquehal (loan)	57	(9)
2003	Amiens	15	(3)
2003–2010	Charleroi	125	(12)
2011	Panthrakikos	14	(3)
2012	FC Charleroi	?	(?)

International career
2004	Morocco	1	(1)
- * Club domestic league appearances and goals

Abdelmajid Oulmers (born 12 September 1978) is a retired Moroccan professional footballer.

Oulmers is the subject of a major legal battle between football clubs and FIFA over the right to compensation for injuries sustained during international duty. He was sidelined from playing for eight months following an injury sustained playing against Burkina Faso in November 2004.

Oulmers played for Morocco at the 2000 Summer Olympics.
