= Wasquehal FC =

Association football club in France

Wasquehal
- Full name: Wasquehal Football Club
- Founded: 1924; 102 years ago
- Dissolved: 2026; 0 years ago
- Ground: Complexe Lucien Montagne, Wasquehal
- League: National 2 Group C
- 2025–26: National 2 Group B, 13th of 16
- Website: wasquehal-football.com
Home colours	Away colours

Wasquehal Football Club, commonly referred to as Wasquehal FC or simply Wasquehal, was a French football club based in the town of Wasquehal, Hauts-de-France. The club was founded in 1924 and last played in the National 1, the fourth tier of the French football league system.

== History and mergers ==
The club was founded in 1924 as L'Union Sportive de Wasquehal. It was known as Entente Sportive de Wasquehal in 1945, when it merged with L'Association Sportive de Wasquehal (founded in 1931). In 2017, it merged further with Wasquehal Futsal Club and took on the current name.

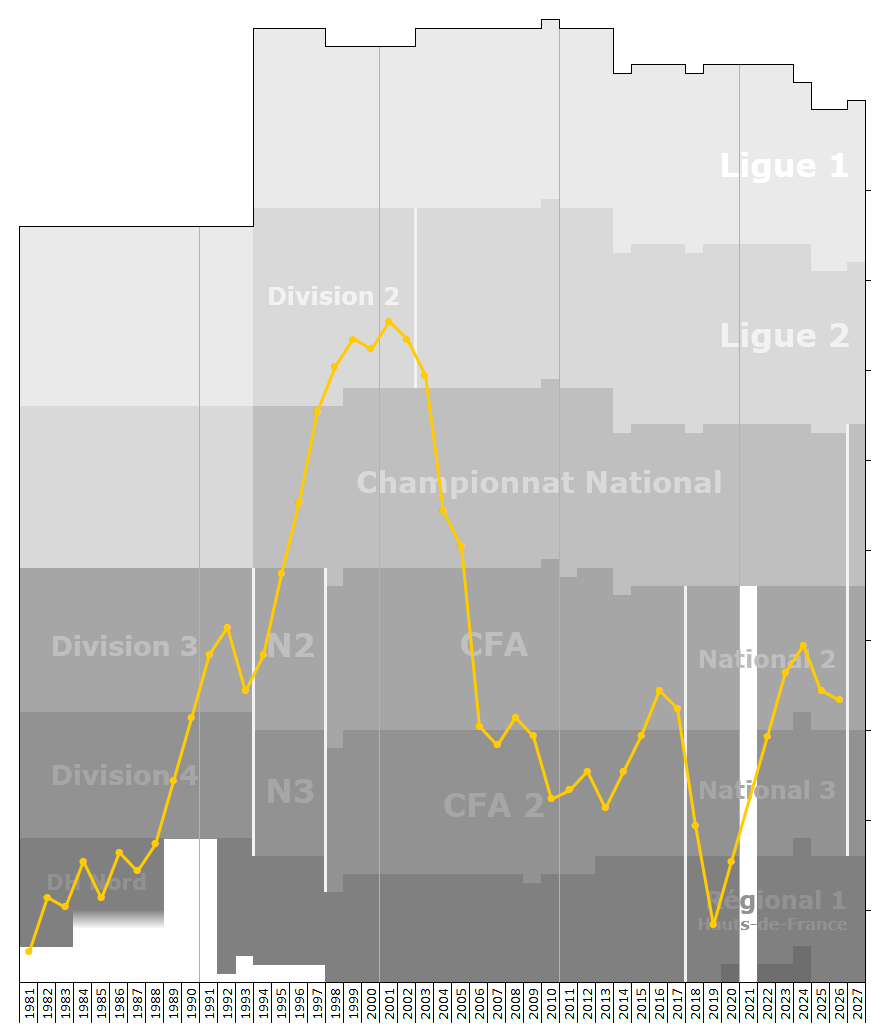
Historical league performance chart of Wasquehal Football

The club held professional status between 1997 and 2004, playing in Ligue 2 from 1997 until 2003.

As of the 2020–21 season, the club plays in Championnat National 3, after securing promotion from Régional 1 in 2020.

In June 2026, the club went bankrupt and disappeared.

== Stadium ==
Wasquehal played their home matches at a minor pitch at the Stadium Lille Metropole in Villeneuve-d'Ascq. In recent years they played at the main stadium but following their relegation from the French National League local rivals Lille OSC have been left as the sole tenants.

== Notable players ==
- (Burkina Faso) Ismaëlo Ganiou (youth)
- (France) Alassane Pléa (youth)
- (Haiti) Hervé Bazile

== Achievements ==
- France Championnat de France Amateur 2 champion (Group D): 2015
- France Division 3 runner-up: 1997
- France Division 4 champion: 1995
- France DH North champion: 1988
- France League 2, 2001 – 13th position (all-time league high)
