= Greenland national football team results =

- Win Draw Loss Void

This is a list of Greenland national football team results from 1980 to present.

== Results ==
=== 1980s ===
2 July 1980 1980 Greenland Cup	Faroe Islands	6–0	Greenland	Sauðárkrókur, Iceland
20:00	Asmund Nolsøe 33', 79', 82', 88'; Kristian Petersen 71'; Samuel Vagalid 78'	Report

4 July 1980 1980 Greenland Cup	Iceland	4–1	Greenland	Húsavík, Iceland
	Larus Godmundsson 23'; Paul Olfsson 32'; Martinus Gerisson 34'; Godmund Steirsson 36'	Report	Kristoffer Ludvigsen 49'

29 June 1983 1983 Greenland Cup	Greenland	0–0	Faroe Islands	Nuuk, Greenland
		Report		Stadium: Nuuk Stadium

3 July 1983 1983 Greenland Cup	Greenland	2–3	Faroe Islands	Nuuk, Greenland
	Kresten Kreutzmann 5'; Lars Sandgreen (?)	Report	Niels Davidson 25'; Eydun Dahl Christiansen 30'; Aksel Højgaard 45'	Stadium: Nuuk Stadium; Attendance: 2,000

3 August 1984 1984 Greenland Cup	Iceland	1–0	Greenland	Fuglafjørður, Faroe Islands
		Report

5 August 1984 1984 Greenland Cup	Faroe Islands	1–0	Greenland	Klaksvík, Faroe Islands
		Report

7 August 1984 Friendly	Faroe Islands	4–2	Greenland	Tórshavn, Faroe Islands
		Report

1986 Friendly	Åland	5–3	Greenland

June 1989 Hybrid friendly	Iceland U16	3–6	Greenland	Reykjavík, Iceland

6 July 1989 1989 Island Games	Greenland	4–1	Shetland	Vágur, Faroe Islands
	Mathæus Larsen (?); Kresten Kreutzmann (?)	Report	Colin Morrison (?)

9 July 1989 1989 Island Games	Faroe Islands	3–0	Greenland	Fuglafjørður, Faroe Islands
	Jens Erik Rasmussen 48', 78', 82'	Report		Stadium: Í Fløtugerði; Attendance: 2,500; Referee: Herman Midjord (Faroe Islands)

11 July 1989 1989 Island Games	Åland	3–0	Greenland	Sandur, Faroe Islands
		Report		Attendance: 200; Referee: John Eysturoy (Faroe Islands)

12 July 1989 1989 Island Games	Ynys Môn	1–0	Greenland	Klaksvík, Faroe Islands
		Report

=== 1990s ===
24 June 1991 1991 Island Games	Jersey	4–3	Greenland	Åland
	Chris Hamon (?); Tony Salaun (?)		Karl Kreutzmann (?); Edvard Kristiansen (?); Peter Møller (?)

25 June 1991 1991 Island Games	Faroe Islands	3–2	Greenland	Åland
	Jens Erik Rasmussen (?); Magni Jarnskor (?)		Karl Kreutzmann (?); Gedion Jørgensen (?)

26 June 1991 1991 Island Games	Shetland	5–2	Greenland	Åland
	Tony Johnston (?); George Watt (?); Michael Williamson (?)		Karl Kreutzmann (?); Jan Nielsen (?)

28 June 1991 1991 Island Games	Isle of Wight	3–1	Greenland	Åland
	Steve Greening (?); Lee Dixon (?); Adam Robinson (?)		Edvard Kristiansen (?)

4 July 1993 1993 Island Games	Ynys Môn	0–1	Greenland	Cowes, Isle of Wight
19:30			Nielsen (?)	Stadium: Westwood Park; Attendance: 340

5 July 1993 1993 Island Games	Jersey	4–2	Greenland	Brading, Isle of Wight
17:00	Greig (?)		Nielsen (?); Janussen (??)	Stadium: Vicarage Lane; Attendance: 220

6 July 1993 1993 Island Games	Greenland	5–0	Gibraltar	Freshwater, Isle of Wight
17:00	Gabrielsen (?); Janussen (?); Nielsen (?)			Stadium: Camp Road

9 July 1993 1993 Island Games	Greenland	1–2	Åland	Cowes, Isle of Wight
14:30	Kreutzmann 67'			Stadium: Westwood Park

16 July 1995 1995 Island Games	Gibraltar	0–1	Greenland	Gibraltar
			Johanesen (?)	Stadium: Victoria Stadium; Attendance: 4,000

17 July 1995 1995 Island Games	Greenland	1–2	Ynys Môn	Gibraltar
	Janissen 66'		Williams 9'; Hughes 86'	Stadium: Victoria Stadium

18 July 1995 1995 Island Games	Greenland	4–0	Isle of Man	Gibraltar
	J. Nielsen 16', 38'; Muller 28'; A. Nielsen (??)			Stadium: Victoria Stadium

20 July 1995 1995 Island Games	Greenland	1–2	Isle of Wight	Gibraltar
	Muller (?)		Barsdell (?)	Stadium: Victoria Stadium

21 July 1995 1995 Island Games	Jersey	6–3 (a.e.t.)	Greenland	Gibraltar
	Greig 11', 72'; Morton 25'; Perez (?); Daley (?); Peebles (?)		Malik Petersen 5'; Anda Kielsen 40'; Jan Nielsen 55'	Stadium: Victoria Stadium

30 June 1997 1997 Island Games	Greenland	1–2	Jersey	St Peter, Jersey
18:00	Jan Nielsen (?)		Adam Greig (?); Steve Coutanche (?)	Stadium: La Hague Manor

1 July 1997 1997 Island Games	Guernsey	0–0	Greenland	St Helier, Jersey
18:00				Stadium: Springfield Stadium

2 July 1997 1997 Island Games	Gibraltar	5–1	Greenland	St Lawrence, Jersey
15:30	Nathan Bagu (?); Dennis Lopez (?); Aaron Lima (?)		Charles Rasmussen (?)	Stadium: La Couvent

3 July 1997 1997 Island Games	Frøya	2–1	Greenland	Grouville, Jersey
15:30	Karl Måsøval (?)		Jan Nielsen (?)	Stadium: La Boulivot

27 June 1999 1999 Island Games	Greenland	4–1	Saaremaa	Väskinde, Gotland
	John Davidsen (?); Jan Nielsen (?); Rene Overballe (?)		Piehl (?)

28 June 1999 1999 Island Games	Frøya	1–3	Greenland	Dalhem, Gotland
	Hallgeir Pettersen (?)		Jan Nielsen (?); Jakob Petersen (?); Jens Jakob Hansen (?)

29 June 1999 1999 Island Games	Isle of Wight	7–2	Greenland	Väskinde, Gotland
	A. Barsdell (?); D. Plenty (?); L. Dent (?); A. Sunsburg (?); P. Young (?)		Harry Enggaard (?); Karl Rosbach (?)

1 July 1999 1999 Island Games	Greenland	0–2	Rhodes	Fårösund, Gotland
			S. Galands (?); G. Karikis (?)

1 July 1999 1999 Island Games	Gotland	7–2	Greenland	Norrbacka, Gotland

=== 2000s ===
30 June 2001 Friendly	Greenland	4–1	Tibet	Copenhagen, Denmark
			Lobsang Norbu (?)	Stadium: Vanløse Idrætspark; Attendance: 5,000

4 July 2001 Friendly	Sápmi	5–1	Greenland	Odense, Denmark

8 July 2001 2001 Island Games	Isle of Wight	0–0	Greenland	Peel, Isle of Man
				Stadium: Douglas Road

9 July 2001 2001 Island Games	Greenland	0–2	Rhodes	Ramsey, Isle of Man
				Stadium: Ballacloan Stadium

12 July 2001 2001 Island Games	Greenland	4–0	Falkland Islands	Braddan, Isle of Man
	Tom Nielsen (?); Anders H. Petersen (?)			Stadium: Garey Mooar

13 July 2001 2001 Island Games	Greenland	2–0	Saaremaa	Ramsey, Isle of Man
	Knud Olsen Egede (?) unknown (?)			Stadium: Ballacloan Stadium

29 June 2003 2003 Island Games	Isle of Wight	1–2	Greenland	St Martin, Guernsey
	Aaron Cook 58'		Leifeeraq Karlsen 25'; Mark Fletcher 55' (o.g.)	Stadium: Blanche Pierre Lane

30 June 2003 2003 Island Games	Gibraltar	2–0	Greenland	St Martin, Guernsey
	Al Greene (?); Dylan Moreno (?)			Stadium: Blanche Pierre Lane

1 July 2003 2003 Island Games	Greenland	16–0	Sark	St Martin, Guernsey
	Anders H. Petersen 6', 20', 38'; Vitus Kofoed 9', 15', 25', 37', 44', 50'; Joel Hansen 28'; Peri Fleischer 33'; Anda Aminaq 60'; Leifeeraq Karlsen 62'; Jens Madsen 66'; Wayne Dolan 68' (o.g.); Niklas Kreutzmann 74'			Stadium: Blanche Pierre Lane

3 July 2003 2003 Island Games	Alderney	0–3	Greenland	St Sampson, Guernsey
			John Eldevig 31'; Niklas Kreutzmann 84'; Peter Svane 90'	Stadium: The Corbet Field

4 July 2003 2003 Island Games	Gotland	2–1 (a.e.t.)	Greenland	St Sampson, Guernsey
	Magnus Aronsson 3'; Johan Hultman 102'		Vitus Kofoed 38'	Stadium: The Corbet Field

10 July 2005 2005 Island Games	Greenland	0–0	Ynys Môn	Whalsay, Shetland
14:00				Stadium: Harbison Park

11 July 2005 2005 Island Games	Greenland	2–1	Orkney	Unst, Shetland
14:00	Brian Thomsen 10'; Peri Fleischer 84'		Steven Poke 76'

12 July 2005 2005 Island Games	Western Isles	4–4	Greenland	Burra, Shetland
14:00	Alasdair Mackay 57'; Gordon Morrison 66', 88'; Murdo Maclennan 89'		Salomon Thomassen 2', 37', 66'; Leifeeraq Karlsen 50'

13 July 2005 2005 Island Games	Guernsey	6–0	Greenland	Burra, Shetland
	Dave Rihoy 9'; Neil Clegg 11'; John Nobes 45'; Dominic Heaume 58'; Joby Bourgaize 73'; Daragh Duffy 80'

15 July 2005 2005 Island Games	Åland	3–2	Greenland	Scalloway, Shetland
11:00	Fredrik Rautiainen 26'; Jonas Blonqvist 30'; Dan Lindblom 70'		Brian Thomsen 12'; Leifeeraeq Karlsen 72'	Stadium: Fraser Park

29 May 2006 FIFI Wild Cup	Northern Cyprus	1–0	Greenland	Hamburg, Germany
18:00	Ali Oraloğlu 55'			Stadium: Millerntor-Stadion; Referee: Tobias Mayer (Germany)

31 May 2006 FIFI Wild Cup	Greenland	2–4	Zanzibar	Hamburg, Germany
20:15	Anders Cortsen 6'; Kaassannquaq Zeeb 12'		Alek Mohammed 55', 88'; Abdallah Juma 59', 77'	Stadium: Millerntor-Stadion

19 November 2006 ELF Cup	Găgăuzia	0–2	Greenland	Kyrenia, Northern Cyprus
12:00			Kristian Sandgreen 33'; Niklas Kreutzmann 68' (pen.)	Stadium: 20 Temmuz Stadium; Referee: Fahim Dayı (Northern Cyprus)

20 November 2006 ELF Cup	Greenland	1–1	Zanzibar U20	Gazimağusa, Northern Cyprus
14:00	Pelle Murt Leysen 78'		Rajab Rashid Omar 62'	Stadium: Dr. Fazıl Küçük Stadium; Referee: Serdar Bilginer (Northern Cyprus)

21 November 2006 ELF Cup	Greenland	0–1	Kyrgyzstan (futsal)	Kyrenia, Northern Cyprus
12:00			Vadim Kondratkov 24'	Stadium: 20 Temmuz Stadium; Referee: Cevdet Mertkaya (Northern Cyprus)

28 June 2009 2009 Island Games	Åland	4–2	Greenland	Mariehamn, Åland
	Petter Isaksson 16'; David Welin 33'; Alexander Weckstrom 42'; André Karring 51'		Pavia Mølgaard 58', 90'	Stadium: Wiklöf Holding Arena; Attendance: 900

29 June 2009 2009 Island Games	Menorca	6–0	Greenland	Sund, Åland
	Alejandro Perez Palliser 22'; Pere Rodriguez Prats 27'; Gabriel Llabrés 38'; Jordi Segui 73'; David Mas 76'; John Mercadal 90'			Stadium: Sportkila

30 June 2009 2009 Island Games	Greenland	3–1	Shetland	Sund, Åland
	Hans Knudsen 6'; Pavia Mølgaard 65', 90'		Leighton Flaws 24'	Stadium: Sportkila

2 July 2009 2009 Island Games	Greenland	3–4	Gotland	Jomala, Åland
19:30	Peri Fleischer 17', 68'; Kaati Lund Mathiassen 44'		Peter Ohman 10', 15'; Emil Segerlund 22'; Andrean Lindblom 53'	Stadium: Vikingavalenn

=== 2010s ===
26 June 2011 2011 Island Games	Rhodes	2–1	Greenland	Brading, Isle of Wight
15:00	Panagiotis Mathios 30'; Panagiotis Pompou 55'	Report	Pavia Mølgaard 86'	Stadium: Vicarage Lane; Attendance: 204; Referee: Gary Sutton (England)

27 June 2011 2011 Island Games	Greenland	2–3	Menorca	East Cowes, Isle of Wight
19:00	Pavia Mølgaard 38'; John-Ludvig Broberg 65'	Report	Ignasi Dalmedo 6'; David Mas 51', 90'	Stadium: Beatrice Avenue; Attendance: 60; Referee: Gavin Ward (England)

28 June 2011 2011 Island Games	Greenland	1–2	Jersey	Freshwater, Isle of Wight
19:00	Norsaq Lund Mathæussen 87'	Report	Craig Leitch 9' (pen.); Craig Russell 58'	Stadium: Camp Road; Attendance: 80; Referee: Chris Powell (England)

30 June 2011 2011 Island Games	Greenland	1–0	Western Isles	Shanklin, Isle of Wight
14:00	Anders H. Petersen 88'	Report		Stadium: Green Lane; Referee: Daniel Cook (England)

14 July 2013 2013 Island Games	Bermuda	3–0	Greenland	Hamilton, Bermuda
20:00	Damico Coddington 10'; Antwan Russell 51'; Zeiko Lewis 58'	Report		Stadium: Bermuda National Stadium

15 July 2013 2013 Island Games	Greenland	12–0	Frøya	Hamilton, Bermuda
20:00	John-Ludvig Broberg 2', 57'; Anders H. Petersen 9'; Sakiu Lundblad 17'; Palu Petersen 27'; Norsaq Lund Mathæussen 33', 70', 80'; Kaali Lund Mathæussen 47', 52'; Joar Sigurd Johansen 73' (o.g.); Lars Peter Broberg 87'	Report		Stadium: Bermuda Athletics Association

17 July 2013 2013 Island Games	Falkland Islands	0–9	Greenland	Hamilton, Bermuda
18:00		Report	Norsaq Lund Mathæussen 5', 8'; Minik Stephensen 20'; Johan Bidstrup 38', 61'; Aputsiaq Birch 42'; Maasi Maqe 57'; John-Ludvig Broberg 59'; Palu Petersen 63'	Stadium: Bermuda National Stadium

18 July 2013 2013 Island Games	Bermuda	1–0	Greenland	Hamilton, Bermuda
20:00	Drewonde Bascome 88' (pen.)	Report		Stadium: Bermuda National Stadium

28 June 2015 2015 Island Games	Greenland	2–2	Menorca	Grouville, Jersey
12:30	Frederik Funch (?); John-Ludvig Broberg (?)	Report	Pablo Rioja (?); Izan Canet (?)	Stadium: Le Boulivot

29 June 2015 2015 Island Games	Åland	0–2	Greenland	St Clement, Jersey
12:30		Report	Frederik Funch (?); Malik Juhl (?)	Stadium: La Coeffardiere; Attendance: 84

30 June 2015 2015 Island Games	Greenland	2–1	Saaremaa	Grouville, Jersey
15:00	Frederik Funch (?); John-Ludvig Broberg (?)	Report	unknown (?)	Stadium: Le Boulivot

2 July 2015 2015 Island Games	Isle of Wight	1–2	Greenland	St Clement, Jersey
12:00	Nathan Lewis (?)	Report	Norsaq Lund Mathæussen (?); Kaali Lund Mathæussen (?)	Stadium: La Coeffardiere; Attendance: 70

25 June 2017 2017 Island Games	Western Isles	0–3	Greenland	Visby, Gotland
17:00		Report	Niels Svane 20'; Nukannguaq Zeeb 45'; Johan Bistrup 90'	Stadium: Gutavallen

26 July 2017 2017 Island Games	Frøya	2–2	Greenland	Hemse, Gotland
17:00	Bjarne Sørdal 13'; Andreas Johansen 40'	Report	Norsaq Lund Mathæussen 27'; Malik Juuhl 77'

27 June 2017 2017 Island Games	Gotland	0–1	Greenland	Visby, Gotland
17:00		Report	Norsaq Lund Mathæussen 4'	Stadium: Visborgsvallen

29 June 2017 2017 Island Games	Greenland	1–1 (a.e.t.) (3–1 p)	Menorca	Väskinde, Gotland
13:00	Malik Juhl (?)	Report	Adrià Mercadal Mercadal 25'
	Penalties
	Aputsiaq Birch (penalty scored); Johan Bistrup (penalty scored); John-Ludvig Broberg (penalty missed); Anders H. Petersen (penalty scored); Malik Juhl (penalty missed)		(penalty missed) Miquel Capó Payeras; (penalty missed) Victor Lebrero Fernandez; (penalty missed) David Febrer Pons; (penalty scored) Javier Zurbano Lacalle

30 June 2017 2017 Island Games	Greenland	0–6	Isle of Man	Visby, Gotland
13:00		Report	Daniel Simpson 24', 36'; Frank Jones 58'; Ciaran McNulty 80'; Liam Doyle 83', 86'	Stadium: Gutavallen; Referee: Adam Ladebäck (Sweden)

=== 2020s ===
23 September 2022 Hybrid friendly	Greenland	0–1	Kosovo U21	Kemer, Turkey
		Report	Dion Krasniqi 77'

9 July 2023 2023 Island Games	Orkney	2–2	Greenland	Saint Martin, Guernsey
	Connan Rendall 1'; Toby Macleod 46'		Nemo Thomsen 10', 60'	Stadium: Blanche Pierre Lane

10 July 2023 2023 Island Games	Greenland	2–0	Frøya	Saint Sampson, Guernsey
10:30 UTC+1	Niels Erik Eriksen 70'; Nemo Thomsen 77'	Report		Stadium: Northfield Stadium

11 July 2023 2023 Island Games	Greenland	2–3	Bermuda U23	Saint Sampson, Guernsey
	Nemo Thomsen 72', 79'		Jai Bean 6'; Tokia Russel 62'; Blaiz Hall 81'	Stadium: The Corbet Field

13 July 2023 2023 Island Games	Shetland	5–1	Greenland	Saint Sampson, Guernsey
	Ronan Grant 11', 40', 66'; James Aitken 59'; Neil Laurenson 62'		Nemo Thomsen 49'	Stadium: The Corbet Field

1 June 2024 Friendly	Greenland	0–5	Turkmenistan	Antalya, Turkey
16:00 UTC+3		Report	Tagaýew 55', 69'; Tirkişow 75'; Durdyýew 78'; Abdyrahmanow 83'	Stadium: Sense De Luxe Hotel Stadium

6 June 2025 Friendly	Sydslesvig	3–4	Greenland	Flensborg, Germany
19.00

6 October 2025 ANT Nations Cup 2025	Austria Amateurs	5–1	Greenland	Neunkirchen, Austria
		Report		Stadium: Städtische Sportanlage

8 October 2025 ANT Nations Cup 2025	Slovenia Amateurs	5–4	Greenland	Traiskirchen, Austria
		Report	Petersen (?); Christensen; Thomsen	Stadium: Sportzentrum Traiskirchen

31 May 2026 Friendly	Friuli	5–0	Greenland	Manzano, Italy
18:15				Stadium: Campo Polisportivo Comunale Cav. Giuseppe Morigi

3 June 2026 2026 CONIFA European Football Cup	Padania	3–1	Greenland	Carate Brianza, Italy
14:30	Ravasi 36'; Colombo 54'; Rossetti 86'		Ejler 55'	Stadium: Stadio XXV Aprile

4 June 2026 2026 CONIFA European Football Cup	Raetia	1–4	Greenland	Carate Brianza, Italy
	Agaei 85'		Eriksen Petersen 1'; Johansen 33'; Gundel-Collin 53'; B. Rosing 59'	Stadium: Stadio XXV Aprile

6 June 2026 2026 CONIFA European Football Cup	Greenland	3–2	Canton Ticino	Carate Brianza, Italy
14:00	Gundel-Collin 9'; Jensen 51'; Ejler 80'		Bejeranu 22'; Heimidach 61'	Stadium: Carate Stadium

== Head-to-head record ==
As of 4 June 2026

Opponent	P	W	D	L	GF	GA	GD	Win %
FIFA members
Bermuda	2	0	0	2	0	4	−4	0.00
Faroe Islands	7	0	1	6	6	20	−14	0.00
Gibraltar	4	2	0	2	7	7	+0	50.00
Iceland	2	0	0	2	1	5	−4	0.00
Turkmenistan	1	0	0	1	0	5	−5	0.00
Total FIFA	16	2	1	13	14	41	−27	12.50
Non FIFA members
Åland	6	1	0	5	10	17	−7	16.67
Alderney	1	1	0	0	3	0	+3	100.00
Bermuda U23	1	0	0	1	2	3	−1	0.00
Falkland Islands	2	2	0	0	13	0	+13	100.00
Frøya	5	3	1	1	20	5	+15	60.00
Găgăuzia	1	1	0	0	2	0	+2	100.00
Gotland	4	2	0	2	8	12	−4	50.00
Guernsey	2	0	1	1	0	6	−6	0.00
Isle of Man	2	1	0	1	4	6	−2	50.00
Isle of Wight	6	2	1	3	8	14	−6	33.33
Jersey	5	0	0	5	10	18	−8	0.00
Kosovo U21	1	0	0	1	0	1	−1	0.00
Kyrgyzstan (futsal)	1	0	0	1	0	1	−1	0.00
Menorca	4	0	2	2	5	12	−7	0.00
Northern Cyprus	1	0	0	1	0	1	−1	0.00
Orkney	2	1	1	0	4	3	+1	50.00
Padania	1	0	0	1	1	3	−2	0.00
Raetia	1	1	0	0	4	1	+3	100.00
Rhodes	3	0	0	3	1	6	−5	0.00
Saaremaa	3	3	0	0	8	2	+6	100.00
Sápmi	1	0	0	1	1	5	−4	0.00
Sark	1	1	0	0	16	0	+16	100.00
Shetland	4	2	0	2	10	12	−2	50.00
Tibet	1	1	0	0	4	1	+3	100.00
Western Isles	3	2	1	0	8	4	+4	66.67
Ynys Môn	4	1	1	2	2	3	−1	25.00
Zanzibar	1	0	0	1	2	4	−2	0.00
Zanzibar U20	1	0	1	0	1	1	+0	0.00
Total non FIFA	68	25	9	34	147	141	+6	36.76
Total	84	27	10	47	161	182	−21	32.14
