= 2024 CONIFA World Football Cup qualification =

Tournament details
- Dates: June – July 2023
- Teams: 7 (from 1 confederation)

Tournament statistics
- Matches played: 5
- Goals scored: 28 (5.6 per match)
- Top scorer: (Székely Land) Kovács (4 goals)

The 2024 CONIFA World Football Cup qualification is the process to decide a number of the teams that will play in the 2024 CONIFA World Football Cup. This is the third tournament to feature a qualification process. The first qualification match was played on 17 June 2023 between Canton Ticino and Raetia.

== European qualification ==
On 14 June, CONIFA announced the groups for the European qualification. Of CONIFA's 19 members, initially 10 were confirmed as participants in the 2024 qualification. However, Padania later withdrew with no formal reason provided and no replacement announced.

Group A	Group B	Group C	Group D
(Cornwall) Kernow; Sápmi	Canton Ticino; Raetia; ~~Padania~~	Székely Land; Chameria; Two Sicilies	Abkhazia; ~~Artsakh~~

=== Group A ===
16 July 2023
13:00 WEST

Kernow (Cornwall)	2–1	Sápmi
Gilbert; Jennings (pen.)		Leppakangas

Bickland Park Stadium, Falmouth

=== Group B ===
17 June 2023
18:00 CEST

Canton Ticino	1–8	Raetia
Sanchez 72'		Tasco 20'; Perren 38'; Osvald 41'; Bulloni 45+1', 67'; Bucher 52'; Good 77'; Kastrie 90'

Brochini-CST Stadium, Tenero-Contra

=== Group C ===
Team	Pld	W	D	L	GF	GA	GD	Pts
Székely Land (Q)	2	2	0	0	10	2	+8	6
Chameria	2	1	0	1	5	4	+1	3
Two Sicilies	2	0	0	2	1	10	−9	0

Source: CONIFA Europe WFC Qualifier 2023
(Q) Qualified for the phase indicated
30 June 2023
19:00 CEST

Székely Land	3–2	Chameria
Szilard 58'; Veres 89'; Kovács 90+1'		Sejdini 38' (pen.); Gjeci 90+6'

Eross Zsolt Stadium, Csikszereda

1 July 2023
19:00 CEST

Chameria	3–1	Two Sicilies
Sejdini 40'; Gjoka 52', 73'		Mendil 82' (pen.)

Eross Zsolt Stadium, Csikszereda

2 July 2023
19:00 CEST

Two Sicilies	0–7	Székely Land
		Szilard 34'; Kovács; Györgyi; Csürös

Eross Zsolt Stadium, Csikszereda

=== Group D ===
~~TBD~~

Abkhazia	Cancelled	Artsakh†

Dinamo Stadium, Sokhumi

† Artsakh withdrew from the competition due to ongoing instability, Abkhazia selected for 2024 CONIFA World Football Cup. See more: Armenia–Azerbaijan border crisis (2021–present)

== See also ==
- 2024 CONIFA World Football Cup
- CONIFA
