= 2023 CONIFA European Football Cup =

Tournament details
- Dates: Cancelled
- Teams: 12

The 2023 CONIFA European Football Cup was planned to be the fourth edition of this tournament, an international football tournament for states, minorities, stateless peoples and regions unaffiliated with FIFA with an affiliation to Europe, organised by CONIFA. Northern Cyprus were originally announced as hosts, but withdrew to support humanitarian efforts in Turkey; the tournament was then subsequently cancelled.

== Hosts and format ==
Originally Northern Cyprus was announced as the host on 9 November 2022. However, on 16 February 2023, following the 2023 Turkey–Syria earthquake the decision was made to relocate the tournament to enable Northern Cyprus to focus on supporting humanitarian efforts in Turkey. No replacement host was announced at the time, with the tournament later cancelled.

Twelve teams were to be divided into four groups of three teams. At the end of the tournament, the four semifinalists were to qualify for the 2024 CONIFA World Football Cup. In addition, the six first qualified teams were to clinch a direct spot for the 2026 European Football Cup.

== Participants ==
Team	Previous appearances in tournament (Note: Bold indicates champion for that year. Italic indicates host for that year.)
Abkhazia	2 (2017, 2019)
Kárpátalja	1 (2017)
Kernow	0 (debut)
Northern Cyprus	1 (2017)
Padania	3 (**2015**, **2017**, 2019)
Raetia	0 (debut)
Sápmi	1 (2019)
Sardinia	0 (debut)
Sicily	0 (debut)
South Ossetia	2 (2017, **2019**)
Székely Land	3 (2015, 2017, 2019)
Two Sicilies	0 (debut)

=== Draw ===
A total of twelve teams were scheduled to participate, with their seedings below.

Pot A	Pot B	Pot C	Pot D
Northern Cyprus; South Ossetia; Kárpátalja	Abkhazia; Padania; Kernow	Sápmi; Székely Land; Sardinia	Sicily; Raetia; Two Sicilies

4 teams have been named as reserve sides in case other teams withdraw from the tournament; Elba Island, Yorkshire, Canton Ticino and Chameria.
