= Two Sicilies national football team =

Unofficial Italian football team

Two Sicilies
- Association: Regno delle Due Sicilie FA
- Confederation: Football Alliance of Territorial Identities
- Head coach: Ludovico Lanzilli
First colours	Second colours

First international
- Padania 0–0 Two Sicilies (Darfo Boario Terme, Italy; April 30, 2009)

Biggest win
- Two Sicilies 3–0 Sardinia (Avellino, Italy; September 23, 2009)

Biggest defeat
- Székely Land 7–0 Two Sicilies (Csíkszereda, Romania; July 2, 2023)

VIVA World Cup
- Appearances: 1 (first in 2010)
- Best result: Fourth place (2010)

The national football team of the Two Sicilies is the football team of the Two Sicilies, which are a territory formed by the southern part of Italy including the Island of Sicily. The team is controlled by the Regno delle Due Sicilie FA. As the Two Sicilies are not a recognised state they are neither a member of FIFA nor UEFA, and the team therefore is not eligible to enter either the World Cup or European Championship. However, from January 2010, they became a provisional member of the NF-Board. The team was a member of ConIFA from January 2021 to January 2026 before announcing their membership of the Football Alliance of Territorial Identities.

== History ==
In December 2008, the national football team of the Two Sicilies was established on the initiative of Guglielmo Di Grezia and Antonio Pagano, with the purpose, then not achieved, to participate in the 2009 VIVA World Cup. On April 30, 2009, the team played its first match against Padania in Darfo Boario Terme during the charity tournament "1° Trofeo SMArathon".

They made their VIVA World Cup debut against Iraqi Kurdistan, of the fourth edition of the tournament. Two Sicilies took fourth place, losing the 3rd-place match against Occitania. On September 23, 2010, the team took part in the second edition of "Trofeo del Mediterraneo", against Gozo and ASD Castellana, which they went on to win. after which it disappeared.

In 2020 Massimo Amitrano established Kingdom of the Two Sicilies FA. Over the years they have been called up several players from 7 regions of the south, among the former professional footballers, also making their debut: Giuseppe Garziano, Maykol Setola, Nicola Mora, Raffaele Imparato, Luca Natale Imbroinisi, Mario Ferri, Federico Di Fuzio, Nassim Mendil, Vincenzo Margiotta, Fabiano Santacroce, Emanuele Calaiò, Sossio Aruta, Gennaro Scarlato.

It was supposed to participate in the 2021 and 2023 editions of the CONIFA European Football Cup, before they were canceled.

In 2023, Two Sicilies participated in the 2024 CONIFA World Cup Qualifiers. They were placed in Group C with Sekler Land and Chameria. Two Sicilies ended up losing both their games, 3–1 to Chameria and 7–0 to Sekler Land. But they were selected anyway to participate, before the tournament was canceled.

In January 2026, Two Sicilies announced that they had withdrawn from CONIFA to join the Football Alliance of Territorial Identities. Two Sicilies were at the time rumoured to be the unannounced hosts of the 2026 CONIFA European Football Cup, CONIFA did not issue any statement regarding their withdrawal or status of the tournament.

== Regno delle Due Sicilie FA ==
The Regno delle Due Sicilie FA is The Football Association of Two Sicilies.

== Team image ==
=== Kit suppliers ===
Kit supplier	Period
?	2009–2021
(Italy) Givova	2021–present

== Competitive record ==
=== World Cup record ===
Year	Position	GP	W	D	L	GS	GA
VIVA World Cup
(Gozo) 2010	Fourth place	4	1	0	3	2	8
(Kurdistan Region) 2012	Withdrew						
ConIFA World Football Cup
(Sápmi) 2014	Not a member of ConIFA						
(Abkhazia) 2016	Not a member of ConIFA						
(Ogaden) 2018	Not a member of ConIFA						
(North Macedonia) 2020	Not a member of ConIFA						
(Kurdistan Region) 2024	Qualified, but cancelled						
Total		4	1	0	3	2	8

=== European Cup record ===
Year	Position	P	W	D	L	F	A
ConIFA European Football Cup
(Hungary) 2015	Not a member of ConIFA						
(Northern Cyprus) 2017	Not a member of ConIFA						
(Republic of Artsakh) 2019	Not a member of ConIFA						
(County of Nice) 2021	Qualified, but cancelled						
(Northern Cyprus) 2023	Qualified, but cancelled						
Total		0	0	0	0	0	0

=== Mediterranean Trophy ===
Year	Position	GP	W	D	L	GS	GA
Mediterranean Trophy
2009	Second place	2	1	0	1	3	2
2010	Champion	2	2	0	0	8	1
2011	Champion	2	2	0	0	9	0
2012	Champion	1	1	0	0	3	2
Total	3 titles	7	6	0	1	23	5

== Results and fixtures ==
Date	Venue		Opponent	Score
November 27, 2023	2023 Givova Trophy, Scafati, Italy	Two Sicilies	Canton Ticino	2–1
June 13, 2012	2012 Mediterranean Trophy, Carrara, Italy	Two Sicilies	Sardinia	3–2
June 16, 2011	2011 Mediterranean Trophy, Ponte, Italy	Two Sicilies	Casalduni Calcio	3–0
June 16, 2011	2011 Mediterranean Trophy, Ponte, Italy	Two Sicilies	Atletico Pontelandolfo	6–0
September 23, 2010	2010 Mediterranean Trophy, Mercogliano, Italy	S.C. Castellana	Two Sicilies	0–6
September 23, 2010	2010 Mediterranean Trophy, Mercogliano, Italy	Two Sicilies	Gozo	2–1
June 5, 2010	2010 VIVA World Cup, Gozo	Two Sicilies	Occitania	0–2
June 4, 2010	2010 VIVA World Cup, Gozo	Two Sicilies	Padania	0–2
June 1, 2010	2010 VIVA World Cup, Gozo	Two Sicilies	Provence	1–0
May 31, 2010	2010 VIVA World Cup, Gozo	Two Sicilies	Kurdistan Region	1–4
September 23, 2009	2009 Mediterranean Trophy, Mercogliano, Italy	Two Sicilies	Sardinia	3–0
September 23, 2009	2009 Mediterranean Trophy, Mercogliano, Italy	Two Sicilies	U.S. Serino calcio	0–2
April 30, 2009	Trofeo SMArathon, Darfo Boario Terme, Italy	U.S. Darfo Boario S.S.D.	Two Sicilies	2–0
April 30, 2009	Trofeo SMArathon, Darfo Boario Terme, Italy	Two Sicilies	Padania	0–0

== Managers ==
Manager	Period	Played	Won	Drawn	Lost	Win %
(Italy) Michele Riviello	2009–2011	12	7	1	4	58.3
(Italy) Gianfranco Napolitano	2012	1	1	0	0	100.0
(Italy) Gennaro Iezzo	2021	0	0	0	0	—
(Italy) Ludovico Lanzilli	2021–	0	0	0	0	—
Totals		12	7	1	4	58.3

== See also ==
- Category:Footballers from Campania
- Category:Footballers from Sicily
