= CONIFA European Football Cup =

- Organiser(s): CONIFA
- Founded: 2015
- Region: Europe (CONIFA)
- Teams: 17
- Current champions: Northern Cyprus (1st title)
- Most championships: Padania (2 titles)
- 2026 CONIFA European Football Cup

The CONIFA European Football Cup is an international football tournament organized by CONIFA, an umbrella association for states, minorities, stateless peoples and regions unaffiliated with FIFA, planned to be held every two years beginning with 2015. The 2017 edition was in Northern Cyprus.

== History ==
Map of CONIFA European Football Cup Locations

=== Hungary 2015 ===
In June 2014 CONIFA announced plans to organize the ConIFA European Football Cup. 3 FAs applied to host the tournament: Abkhazia, Ellan Vannin and Nagorno Karabakh. Ellan Vannin was announced as host on August 6. However, in March 2015, at the draw for the competition, the tournament was moved as a result of logistical issues; Székely Land was announced as the replacement host, with the competition to be held in Hungary.

=== Northern Cyprus 2017 ===
In January 2017 CONIFA announced that the 2017 edition of the CONIFA European Football Cup would take place in Northern Cyprus. The competition featured 8 teams, 2 more than in 2015.

=== Republic of Artsakh 2019 ===
In August 2018, CONIFA announced the 2019 edition of the CONIFA European Football Cup took place in Nagorno Karabakh and featured 12 teams, 4 more than in 2017. However, this was revised down to 8 teams following the late withdrawal of 4 teams.

=== County of Nice 2021 ===
In January 2021, CONIFA announced the 2021 edition of the CONIFA European Football Cup took place in Nice, France and featured 12 teams, 4 more than in the 2017 and 2019 editions. This was announced in a backdrop of the then-ongoing COVID-19 Global Pandemic.

=== Northern Cyprus 2023 ===
In September 2022, CONIFA announced the 2023 edition of the CONIFA European Football Cup would take place in Northern Cyprus. It was suspended following the 2023 Turkey–Syria earthquake, to enable Northern Cyprus to focus on supporting humanitarian efforts in Turkey. No replacement host was announced.

=== Insubria 2026 ===
In November 2025, Massimo Amitrano, President of the Two Sicilies FA announced the 2026 edition of the CONIFA European Football Cup would take place in Cilento, Italy. At the time, no formal announcement of the decision was made from one of CONIFA's official social media accounts. On January 9, 2026 Two Siclies announced that they had withdrawn from CONIFA and presumed to withdraw as hosts of the 2026 CONIFA European Football Cup.

On February 14, 2026 CONIFA announced that a 6-team European tournament would be held at the Sportitalia Village in located north of Milan, Italy between June 1–7, 2026.

== Results ==
Ed.	Year	Host	First place game			Third place game			Num. teams
Ed.	Year	Host	(gold) Champion	Score	(silver) Runner-up	(bronze) Third	Score	Fourth	Num. teams
1	2015	(Hungary) Debrecen	Padania	4–1	County of Nice	Ellan Vannin	1–1; 5–3 (p)	Felvidék	6
2	2017	Northern Cyprus	Padania	1–1; 3–2 (p)	Northern Cyprus	Székely Land	3–1	Abkhazia	8
3	2019	Artsakh	South Ossetia	1–0	Western Armenia	Abkhazia	0–0; 5–4 (p)	Chameria	8
~~4~~	~~2022~~	~~County of Nice~~	Suspended (Note: Postponed until 2022 due to COVID-19 Pandemic, Cancelled after host later withdrew)						~~12~~
~~4~~	~~2023~~	~~Northern Cyprus~~	Suspended (Note: Cancelled due to 2023 Turkey–Syria earthquake)						~~12~~
4	2026	(Italy) Insubria	Northern Cyprus	6–1	Padania	Greenland	3–2	Canton Ticino	6

== Appearances ==
Legend

- 1st — Champions
- 2nd — Runners-up
- 3rd — Third place
- 4th — Fourth place
- GS — Group Stage
- q — Qualified for upcoming tournament
- •• — Qualified but withdrew
- • — Did not qualify
- × — Did not enter / Withdrew / Banned / Entry not accepted by CONIFA
- — Hosts

For each tournament, the number of teams in each finals tournament (in brackets) are shown.

Team	2015 (Székely Land) (6)	2017 (Northern Cyprus) (8)	2019 (Republic of Artsakh) (8)	2026 (Italy) (6)	Total participations
Abkhazia	••	4th	3rd	×	2/4
Artsakh	×	×	GS	×	1/4
Chameria	×	×	4th	×	1/4
Canton Ticino	×	×	×	4th	1/4
County of Nice	2nd	••	••	×	1/4
(Isle of Man) Ellan Vannin	3rd	GS	×	×	2/4
Felvidék	4th	GS	•	×	2/4
Greenland	•	•	•	3rd	1/4
Kárpátalja	•	GS	•	×	1/4
Northern Cyprus	••	2nd	•	1st	2/4
Padania	1st	1st	GS	2nd	4/4
Raetia	×	×	×	GS	1/4
Rouet-Provence	×	×	×	GS	1/4
Romani people	GS	•	•	×	1/4
Sápmi	••	••	GS	×	1/4
South Ossetia	••	GS	1st	×	2/4
Székely Land	GS	3rd	GS	×	3/4
Western Armenia	•	•	2nd	×	1/4

== Members of CONIFA Europe ==
As of January 2025

Europe (17)
Abkhazia
Canton Ticino
Chameria
Cornwall
Ellan Vannin
Gozo
Greenland
Kárpátalja
Northern Cyprus
Occitania
Padania
Raetia
Rouet-Provence
Sápmi
South Ossetia
Székely Land
Two Sicilies
