= Hawaii soccer team =

Hawaii soccer team may refer to:

- Hawaii men's soccer team also known as Hui Kanaka Pōwāwae
- Hawaii Rainbow Wahine soccer team of the University of Hawaiʻi
- Team Hawaii, a 1977 team that played in the North American Soccer League
