= Football at the 1991 Island Games =

Football at the Island Games 1991
Tournament details
- Host country: Åland
- Dates: 24–29 June
- Teams: 8

Final positions
- Champions: Faroe Islands (2nd title)
- Runners-up: Ynys Môn
- Third place: Jersey
- Fourth place: Åland

Tournament statistics
- Matches played: 16
- Goals scored: 56 (3.5 per match)
- Top scorer(s): (Faroe Islands) Jens Erik Rasmussen (6 goals)

Football was contested as part of the programme for the 1991 Island Games which was hosted in Åland from 23 to 29 June 1991. It was the second edition of the men's football tournament at the multi-sport event organised by the International Island Games Association.

The football tournament began with the first matches in the group stage on 24 June 1991 and ended with the gold medal match on 29 June 1991. Ynys Môn and the Faroe Islands, the defending champions, contested the final. Goals from Jens Erik Rasmussen and Eyðstein Davidsen helped the Faroe Islands to successfully defend their title as they won the match 2–0 after extra time. In the bronze medal match, Jersey defeated the hosts Åland 2–0.

This was the last time that the Faroe Islands men's team contested the Island Games.

== Background ==
A five-a-side youth football tournament was held at the inaugural games in 1985 held in Douglas, Isle of Man but football was completely absent from the programme at the 1987 Island Games held in Guernsey.

The first men's football tournament was held at the 1989 Island Games in the Faroe Islands. The five nations which entered – Åland, the Faroe Islands, Greenland, Shetland and Ynys Môn – contested a single round robin group. The hosts, the Faroe Islands, won gold, Ynys Môn won silver and Åland won the bronze medal.

== Format ==
Eight teams took part in the competition. They were drawn into two single round robin groups of four teams. The winning team from each group would contest the gold medal match and the runners-up would contest the bronze medal match. Play-off placement matches were held for the teams finishing third and fourth in each group – the third-placed teams contested the fifth-place match and the fourth-placed teams contested the seventh-place match.

=== Participants ===
- Åland
- Faroe Islands
- Greenland
- Guernsey
- Isle of Wight
- Jersey
- Shetland
- Ynys Môn

== Group phase ==
The group phase was played on 24, 25 and 26 June 1991.

=== Group 1 ===
The Faroe Islands won all three of their games to progress to the gold medal match.

Pos	Team	Pld	W	D	L	GF	GA	GD	Pts	Qualification
1	Faroe Islands	3	3	0	0	11	5	+6	6	Qualification for the Gold medal match
2	Jersey	3	2	0	1	9	8	+1	4	Qualification for the Bronze medal match
3	Shetland	3	1	0	2	5	7	−2	2	Qualification for the fifth-place match
4	Greenland	3	0	0	3	7	12	−5	0	Qualification for the seventh-place match

24 June

Faroe Islands	3–0	Shetland
Rasmussen; Jarnskor; Mørkøre

24 June

Jersey	4–3	Greenland
Hamon (3); Salaun		Kreutzmann; Kristiansen; Møller

25 June

Faroe Islands	3–2	Greenland
Rasmussen (2); Jarnskor		Kreutzmann; Jøorgensen

25 June

Jersey	2–0	Shetland
Hamon; Livesey

26 June

Faroe Islands	5–3	Jersey
Reynheim; Thomassen; Rasmussen (2); Dam		Greig (3)

26 June

Shetland	5–2	Greenland
Johnston (2); Watt (2); Williamson		Kreutzmann; Nielsen

=== Group 2 ===
Ynys Môn won all three of their games to progress to the gold medal match.

Pos	Team	Pld	W	D	L	GF	GA	GD	Pts	Qualification
1	Ynys Môn	3	3	0	0	7	1	+6	6	Qualification for the Gold medal match
2	Åland	3	2	0	1	3	1	+2	4	Qualification for the Bronze medal match
3	Guernsey	3	1	0	2	1	4	−3	2	Qualification for the fifth-place match
4	Isle of Wight	3	0	0	3	2	7	−5	0	Qualification for the seventh-place match

24 June

Ynys Môn	1–0	Guernsey
Jones

24 June

Åland	1–0	Isle of Wight
Söderdahl

25 June

Åland	2–0	Guernsey
Marchini; Henriksson

25 June

Ynys Môn	5–1	Isle of Wight
Kasparek (2); Welsh (2); Parry		Grenning

26 June

Åland	0–1	Ynys Môn
		Parry

26 June

Isle of Wight	0–2	Guernsey
		Greening; Luscome

== Placement play-off matches ==
=== Seventh-place match ===
The Isle of Wight defeated Greenland in the seventh-place match.

28 June

Isle of Wight	3–1	Greenland
Greening; Dixon; Robinson		Kristiansen

=== Fifth-place match ===
Shetland defeated Guernsey in the fifth-place match.

28 June

Shetland	2–1	Guernsey
Williamson (2)		Le Tissier

== Bronze medal match ==
Jersey defeated Åland to win the bronze medal.

28 June

Jersey	2–0	Åland
Greig (2)

== Gold medal match ==
After a goalless 90 minutes, the tournament's top scorer, Jens Erik Rasmussen gave the Faroe Islands the lead before Eyðstein Davidsen secured a 2–0 win as the Faroe Islands successfully defended their title.

29 June

Faroe Islands	2–0 (a.e.t.)	Ynys Môn
Rasmussen; Davidsen

== Final rankings ==
Rank	Team
Gold medal	Faroe Islands
Silver medal	Ynys Môn
Bronze medal	Jersey
4	Åland
5	Shetland
6	Guernsey
7	Isle of Wight
8	Greenland

== Top goalscorers ==
There were 56 goals scored in 16 matches, for an average of 3.5 goals per match.

6 goals

- (Faroe Islands) Jens Erik Rasmussen

5 goals

- (Jersey) Adam Greig

4 goals

- (Jersey) Chris Hamon

3 goals

- (Greenland) Karl Kreutzmann
- (Isle of Wight) Steve Greening
- (Shetland) Michael Williamson

2 goals

- (Faroe Islands) Magni Jarnskor
- (Greenland) Edvard Kristiansen
- (Shetland) Tony Johnston
- (Shetland) George Watt

1 goal

- (Åland) Jonas Henriksson
- (Åland) Olav Marchini
- (Åland) Robert Söderdahl
- (Faroe Islands) Jan Dam
- (Faroe Islands) Eyðstein Davidsen
- (Faroe Islands) Kurt Mørkøre
- (Faroe Islands) Kari Reynheim
- (Faroe Islands) Ari Thomasen
- (Greenland) Gedion Jörgensen
- (Greenland) Peter Møller
- (Greenland) Jan Nielsen
- (Guernsey) Darren Le Tissier
- (Guernsey) Larry Luscome
- (Isle of Wight) Lee Dixon
- (Isle of Wight) Adam Robinson
- (Jersey) Neil Livesey
- (Jersey) Tony Salaun
- (Anglesey) Colin Jones
- (Anglesey) Peter Kasparek
- (Anglesey) Bob Parry
- (Anglesey) John Walsh

== Aftermath ==
The Faroe Islands Football Association (FSF) became affiliated with FIFA in 1988 and with UEFA in 1989. The 1991 Island Games would be the last that the Faroe Islands men's team would contest. Having won the first two editions unbeaten, they hold a record of eight wins from eight matches overall.
