= Béla Fejér =

Romanian footballer

Personal information
- Full name: Béla Csongor Fejér
- Date of birth: 11 May 1995 (age 31)
- Place of birth: Zăbala, Romania
- Height: 1.90 m (6 ft 3 in)
- Position: Goalkeeper

Team information
- Current team: Sepsi OSK
- Number: 95

Youth career
- 2004–2013: FC Zagon

Senior career*
Years	Team	Apps	(Gls)
2013–2014	FC Zagon		
2014–2016	ASA Târgu Mureș	1	(0)
2014	→ CSM Râmnicu Vâlcea (loan)	5	(0)
2016–2021	Sepsi OSK	37	(0)
2020–2021	→ Nyíregyháza (loan)	22	(0)
2021–2025	Nyíregyháza	71	(0)
2025–	Sepsi OSK	1	(0)

International career
2014	Romania U19	1	(0)
2018	Kárpátalja	6	(0)
- * Club domestic league appearances and goals as of 3 August 2025

Béla Csongor Fejér (born 11 May 1995) is a Romanian professional footballer who plays as a goalkeeper for Liga I club Sepsi OSK.

== International career ==
At youth level he made one appearance for Romania under-19 in 2014.

In 2018 he was member of the Kárpátalja squad that won the 2018 ConIFA World Football Cup. He saved three penalties in the final shoot-out against Northern Cyprus. For his numerous impressive stints in goals he has been named the Player of the Tournament.

== Personal life ==
Born in Zăbala, Fejér is of Hungarian ethnicity.

== Honours ==
ASA Târgu Mureș

- Supercupa României: 2015

Nyíregyháza

- Nemzeti Bajnokság II: 2023–24

Kárpátalja

- ConIFA World Football Cup: 2018

Individual

- ConIFA World Football Cup Player of the Tournament: 2018
