= Balázs Csiszér =

Romanian footballer

Personal information
- Date of birth: 3 March 1999 (age 27)
- Place of birth: Miercurea Ciuc, Romania
- Height: 1.76 m (5 ft 9 in)
- Position: Right-back

Team information
- Current team: FK Csíkszereda
- Number: 99

Youth career
- –2017: FK Csíkszereda

Senior career*
Years	Team	Apps	(Gls)
2017–2019	FK Csíkszereda		
2018	→ Kaposvár (loan)	0	(0)
2019	→ Budafok (loan)	3	(0)
2019–2022	Sepsi OSK	25	(0)
2022–2024	FK Csíkszereda	18	(0)
2024–	Minaur Baia Mare	0	(0)

International career
2017–2018	Székely Land		
- * Club domestic league appearances and goals as of 13 November 2023

Balázs Csiszér (born 3 March 1999) is a Romanian professional footballer who plays as a defender for Liga III side Minaur Baia Mare.

== International career ==
He was member of the Székely Land squad that finished 3rd at 2017 ConIFA European Football Cup and 4th at the 2018 ConIFA World Football Cup respectively.

== Career statistics ==
=== Club ===
As of match played 13 November 2023

Appearances and goals by club, season and competition
Club	Season	League			National Cup (Note: Includes Cupa Romaniei, Magyar Kupa)		League Cup		Continental		Other		Total	
Club	Season	Division	Apps	Goals	Apps	Goals	Apps	Goals	Apps	Goals	Apps	Goals	Apps	Goals
FK Csíkszereda	2017–18	Liga III	?	?	?	?	—		—		—		?	?
Kaposvár (loan)	2018–19	NB II	0	0	2	0	—		—		—		2	0
Budafok (loan)	2018–19	NB II	3	0	2	0	—		—		—		5	0
Sepsi OSK	2019–20	Liga I	13	0	2	0	—		—		—		15	0
Sepsi OSK	2020–21	Liga I	12	0	0	0	—		—		—		12	0
Sepsi OSK	Total		25	0	2	0	—		—		—		27	0
FK Csíkszereda	2021–22	Liga II	6	0	—		—		—		—		15	0
FK Csíkszereda	2020–21	Liga II	7	0	1	0	—		—		—		12	0
FK Csíkszereda	2023–24	Liga II	5	0	0	0	—		—		—		5	0
FK Csíkszereda	Total		18	0	1	0	—		—		—		19	0
Career total			46	0	7	0	—		—		—		53	0

== Honours ==
FK Csíkszereda

- Liga III: 2018–19

Sepsi OSK

- Cupa României runner-up: 2019–20

Székely Land

- CONIFA European Football Cup third place: 2017
- CONIFA World Football Cup fourth place: 2018
