= Zoltán Baksa =

Ukrainian footballer (born 1983)

Personal information
- Full name: Zoltán Baksa
- Date of birth: 2 January 1983 (age 43)
- Place of birth: Serne, Soviet Union
- Height: 1.78 m (5 ft 10 in)
- Position: Midfielder

Team information
- Current team: Mándok KSE
- Number: 3

Youth career
- Szernyei Oazis FC

Senior career*
Years	Team	Apps	(Gls)
1999–2002	Szernyei Oázis FC	?	(?)
2002–2004	Debreceni VSC	0	(0)
2004–2005	Létavértes SC	?	(?)
2005	FC Zakarpattia Uzhhorod	0	(0)
2006	Nyíregyháza Spartacus FC	12	(0)
2006–2007	Mateszalka FC	12	(1)
2007–2009	Varda SE	?	(?)
2009	SC Beregvidek Berehove	?	(?)
2009–2010	Mándok KSE	15	(5)
2010	Szernyei Oázis FC	17	(7)
2010–2019	Cigánd SE	33	(1)
2019–2022	Nyírkarászi KSE	46	(12)
- * Club domestic league appearances and goals

Zoltán Baksa (born 2 January 1983) is a Hungarian footballer who currently plays for Mándok KSE in the Hungarian Regional League. He usually plays as a midfielder. He is well known football player in his native land in Transcarpathia. CONIFA World Cup 2018 champion as a team captain of Transcarpathia.

== Honours ==
=== National ===
- CONIFA World Cup:
  - Champion (1): 2018

=== Club ===
- Hungarian National Championship 3:
  - Runner-Up (2): 2007–08, 2010–11
  - Third Place (2): 2011–12, 2015–16
- Hungarian Regional League 1:
  - Runner-Up (1): 2006–07
- Hungarian Regional League 2:
  - Runner-Up (1): 2019–20
- Ukrainian Regional League:
  - Champion (1): 2009
- Ukrainian Regional Cup:
  - Runner-Up (1): 2009
- Ukrainian District League:
  - Champion (1): 1999
- Ukrainian District Cup:
  - Winner (1): 1999

=== Individual ===
- (Hungary) Cigánd SE Player Of The Year: 2011
- (Ukraine) Szernyei Oazis FC Player Of The Year: 2001, 2005, 2010
- Player Of The Year in Szernye: 2001, 2003, 2006, 2008
