= Adam Ejler =

Greenlandic footballer (born 2004)

Personal information
- Full name: Adam Ejler Hansen
- Date of birth: 13 January 2004 (age 22)
- Place of birth: Denmark
- Height: 1.70 m (5 ft 7 in)
- Position: Left-back

Team information
- Current team: HB Køge
- Number: 35

Youth career
- 2015–2021: Holbæk B&I
- 2021–2022: HB Køge

Senior career*
Years	Team	Apps	(Gls)
2020–2021	Holbæk B&I	1	(0)
2022	HB Køge	1	(0)
2023–	Holbæk B&I	20	(1)

International career^{‡}
2021–	Greenland	4	(2)
- * Club domestic league appearances and goals as of 7 June 2026 ‡ National team caps and goals as of 7 June 2026

Adam Ejler Hansen (born 13 January 2004) is a professional footballer who plays for Danish side Holbæk B&I. Born in Denmark, he represents the Greenland national team.

== Club career ==
Ejler came up through the academy of Holbæk B&I. He had been with the club since at least 2015 while playing for the under-12 side. On 3 September 2020 he made his senior team debut in a 2–1 2020–21 Danish Cup victory over Suså IF. At 16 years 7 months and 21 days old, he became the youngest player ever to represent the first team in official competition. He was later recognized as a member of the Holbæk Academy Hall of Fame.

In 2021 Ejler moved to the academy of HB Køge of the Danish 1st Division. He made his senior debut for the club as a second-half substitute on 15 October 2022 in a 3–0 victory over Fremad Amager.

== International career ==
Ejler is of Greenlandic descent through his grandparents, but grew up in Denmark. In August 2021, Greenland head coach Morten Rutkjær named Ejler to the 24-man squad that would train and compete against several Danish clubs in Denmark the following month. Ejler was one of two Denmark-based players in the squad, along with Nemo Thomsen. He made his debut for the team in the opening match of the camp, an eventual 1–1 draw with Vildbjerg SF on 8 September 2021. The camp was the first of its kind after the Greenland Football Association began the process of joining CONCACAF. Eljer played regularly during the camp's matches and was named Man of the Match in a 1–4 defeat to FC Nordsjælland at the Right to Dream Park in the final friendly.

He was then part of the roster for Greenland's first match against an official national team after beginning the process of joining CONCACAF, a friendly match against Kosovo under-21 to be played in Turkey in September 2022.

List of international goals scored by Adam Ejler
No.	Date	Venue	Opponent	Score	Result	Competition
1	3 June 2026	Verano Stadium, Carate Brianza, Italy	Padania	1–1	1–3	2026 CONIFA European Football Cup
