= Rene Eriksen Petersen =

Greenlandic footballer (born 2001)

Personal information
- Date of birth: 11 June 2001 (age 25)
- Place of birth: Greenland
- Position: Centre-forward

Team information
- Current team: KÍ

Youth career
- 2018–2020: Nykøbing
- 2020–2022: B.1901

Senior career*
Years	Team	Apps	(Gls)
2022	N-48		
2023–	KÍ	7	(0)
2023–	→ KÍ II (loan)	1	(1)

International career^{‡}
2022–	Greenland	1	(0)
- * Club domestic league appearances and goals as of 18:00, 8 June 2023 (UTC) ‡ National team caps and goals as of 18:00, 8 June 2023 (UTC)

Rene Eriksen Petersen (born 11 June 2001) is a Greenlandic footballer who plays as a forward for Faroe Islands Premier League club Klaksvíkar Ítróttarfelag and the Greenland national team.

== Club career ==
As a youth, Petersen was in the academy of Nykøbing in Denmark. In 2019 B-67 Vice-president Finn Meinel identified him as the best young talent in Greenland. In 2022, he was named to the Greenlandic Football Championship Team of the Year while playing for N-48. He scored in the final to help the club win the championship.

From 31 January to 17 February 2023 Petersen and fellow-Greenlander Bastian Rosing went on trial with Faroese club KÍ Klaksvík through a partnership between the club and B-67. The players had the opportunity to join the first team in the Faroe Islands Premier League or the reserve team in the 1. deild. During the trial, he scored for the reserve team in a training match and spent time with the first team while Rosing was forced out through a knee injury. In March 2023 it was officially announced that Petersen had signed an initial deal with the reserve squad.

== International career ==
Petersen was named to Greenland's squad for the 2021 Island Games to be held in Guernsey. However, the games were eventually cancelled because of the COVID-19 pandemic.

In August 2021, Greenland head coach Morten Rutkjær named Petersen to the 24-man squad that would train and compete against several Danish clubs in Denmark the following month. The camp was the first of its kind after the Greenland Football Association began the process of joining CONCACAF. Petersen was then part of the roster for Greenland's first match against an official national team after beginning the process of joining CONCACAF, a friendly match against Kosovo under-21 played in Turkey in September 2022.

He was named to the squad again for the 2023 Island Games to be played in July of that year.

List of international goals scored by Rene Eriksen Petersen
No.	Date	Venue	Opponent	Score	Result	Competition
1	8 October 2025	Sportzentrum Traiskirchen, Traiskirchen, Austria	Slovenia Amateurs	–	4–5	ANT Nations Cup 2025
2	8 October 2025	Sportzentrum Traiskirchen, Traiskirchen, Austria	Slovenia Amateurs	–	4–5	ANT Nations Cup 2025
3	4 June 2026	Verano Stadium, Carate Brianza, Italy	Raetia	1–0	4–1	2026 CONIFA European Football Cup
