= Kárpátalja football team =

Unofficial national football team representing the region of Carpathian Ruthenia

Kárpátalja
- Confederation: ConIFA
- Head coach: István Sándor
First colours	Second colours

First international
- Kárpátalja 0–5 Székely Land (Berehovo; 16 August 2014)

Biggest win
- Kárpátalja 5–1 Tibet (Bracknell; 3 June 2018)

Biggest defeat
- Kárpátalja 0–5 Székely Land (Berehovo; 16 August 2014)

ConIFA World Football Cup
- Appearances: 1 (first in 2018)
- Best result: Champion (2018)

ConIFA European Football Cup
- Appearances: 1 (first in 2017)
- Best result: 5th Place (2019)

The Kárpátalja football team (Hungarian pronunciation: [ˈkaːrpaːtɒjjɒ], Hungarian: Kárpátaljai magyar labdarúgó-válogatott) is a team representing the Hungarian minority in Carpathian Ruthenia, a historic region mostly located in western Ukraine's Zakarpattia Oblast. It is a member of ConIFA, an umbrella association for states, minorities, stateless peoples and regions unaffiliated with FIFA.

== History ==
Kárpátalja joined ConIFA in 2016, first competing in the 2017 ConIFA European Football Cup as an invited team. They lost their first ever international game 1–0 against host nation Northern Cyprus, but defeated South Ossetia on the final day to finish 3rd in Group A and put them in the 5th place play-off. A 5–4 penalty shootout win over Ellan Vannin ensured that they finished 5th overall.

Due to their inactivity after the tournament, Kárpátalja failed to qualify for the 2018 ConIFA World Football Cup. However, after the withdrawal of Felvidék, they were admitted to the final tournament as a wildcard replacement. Kárpátalja went on to win the tournament, defeating Northern Cyprus on penalties in the final.

In October 2018, it was reported, by ConIFA, that the Football Federation of Ukraine had banned Kárpátalja players with Ukrainian citizenship from footballing activities for life, whilst Hungarian nationals on the team have been advised they can no longer enter Ukraine.

== Tournament Record ==
=== ConIFA World Football Cup ===
Year	Position	P	W	D	L	F	A
(Sápmi) 2014	did not enter						
(Abkhazia) 2016	did not qualify						
(Barawa) 2018	Champion	6	4	2	0	15	5
(North Macedonia) 2020	cancelled						
(Kurdistan Region) 2024	cancelled						
Total	1 title	6	4	2	0	15	5

=== ConIFA European Football Cup ===
Year	Position	P	W	D	L	F	A
(Székely Land) 2015	did not enter						
(Northern Cyprus) 2017	5th	4	1	2	1	5	6
(Republic of Artsakh) 2019	withdrew						
(County of Nice) 2021	cancelled						
Total		4	1	2	1	5	6

== Fixtures & Results ==
=== 2014 Results ===
16 August 2014	Kárpátalja	0–5	Székely Land	Druzhba Stadium, Berehove, Ukraine

=== 2016 Results ===
1 August 2016	Felvidék	1–1 (5–4 p)	Kárpátalja	Erzsébet-ligeti Sporttelep, Szarvas, Hungary
17:45 CEST	Renczes 30'		42'

=== 2017 Results ===
4 June 2017	Northern Cyprus	1–0	Kárpátalja	Atatürk Stadium, Nicosia
20:00 EEST	Yaşınses 89'

6 June 2017	Kárpátalja	2–2	Abkhazia	Atatürk Stadium, Nicosia
20:00 EEST	Roland 33'; Roman 77'		Anatoli Semyonov 20', 50'

7 June 2017	South Ossetia	1–4	Kárpátalja	Dr. Fazıl Küçük Stadium, Famagusta
20:00 EEST	Kochiev 85'		Mile 20'; Baksa 33'; Barta 45+1'; Kész 62'

9 June 2017	Kárpátalja	3–3 (5–4 p)	Ellan Vannin	Üner Berkalp Stadium, Morphou
20:00 EEST	Kelly (o.g.) 2'; Fodor 30'; Kész 61'		Cown 23'; Cannell 61'; Doyle 83'

=== 2018 Results ===
31 May 2018	Northern Cyprus	1–1	Kárpátalja	Queen Elizabeth II Stadium, Enfield
15:00 BST	Mehmet 13'	Report	I. Sándor 53'

2 June 2018	Abkhazia	0–2	Kárpátalja	Queen Elizabeth II Stadium, Enfield
14:00 BST		Report	Gajdos 11'; I. Sándor 90+8'	Referee: Dmitrii Zhukov

3 June 2018	Kárpátalja	5–1	Tibet	Larges Lane, Bracknell
15:00 BST	Gajdos 2'; G. Sándor 36' (pen.); Takács 42', 77'; Svedjuk 75'	Report	Yougyal 69'	Referee: Raymond Mashamba

5 June 2018	Kárpátalja	3–1	Cascadia	Gander Green Lane, Sutton
18:00 BST	Gyürki 49'; Takács 59'; Gadjos 87' (pen.)	Report	Haddadi 80'	Referee: Fehim Dayı

7 June 2018	Kárpátalja	4–2	Székely Land	Colston Avenue, Carshalton
20:00 BST	Toma 36', 57'; Gyürki 75' (pen.); Peres 90+1'	Report	Csizmadia 77'; Bajkó 79'	Referee: Mark Clattenburg

9 June 2018	Northern Cyprus	0–0 (2–3 p)	Kárpátalja	Queen Elizabeth II Stadium, Enfield
18:00 BST		Report		Referee: Mark Clattenburg
	Penalties
	Mehmet (penalty missed); Kurt (penalty missed); Oshan (penalty scored); Ersalan (penalty scored); Turan (penalty missed)		(penalty scored) Gyürki; (penalty scored) Toma; (penalty missed) Baksa; (penalty missed) I. Sándor; (penalty scored) Svedjuk

== Current squad ==
The following players were called up for the 2018 ConIFA World Football Cup.

No.	Pos.	Player	Date of birth (age)	Caps	Goals	Club
1	GK	Béla Fejér	11 May 1995 (age 30)	0	0	(Romania) Sepsi OSK
2	DF	Csaba Peres	20 October 1996 (age 28)	0	0	(Hungary) Ceglédi VSE
3	MF	Roland Szabó	7 March 1994 (age 31)	4	0	(Hungary) Nyírbátori FC
4	DF	László Rácz	20 October 1996 (age 28)	0	0	(Hungary) SZEOL
5	MF	György Sándor	20 March 1984 (age 41)	0	0	(Hungary) Aqvital FC Csákvár
6	MF	György Toma	27 April 1996 (age 29)	0	0	(Hungary) Cigánd SE
7	FW	Norbert Angyal	28 May 1992 (age 32)	0	0	(Hungary) Szolnoki MÁV FC
8	MF	Zoltán Baksa (captain)	2 January 1983 (age 42)	4	1	(Hungary) Cigánd SE
9	MF	Gergő Gyürki	3 October 1993 (age 31)	0	0	(Hungary) FC Sopron
10	MF	István Sándor	4 January 1986 (age 39)	0	0	(Hungary) Ceglédi VSE
11	MF	Zsolt Gajdos	4 February 1993 (age 32)	0	0	(Hungary) Nyíregyháza Spartacus FC
12	GK	Szergej Petranics	22 March 1972 (age 53)	0	0	Retired
13	DF	Robert Molnar	24 June 1991 (age 33)	0	0	(Hungary) Kisvárda FC
14	DF	Milán Lászik	20 November 1996 (age 28)	0	0	(Hungary) SZEOL
15	FW	Tibor Molnár	12 May 1993 (age 32)	0	0	(Hungary) Aqvital FC Csákvár
16	MF	Kristóf Késmárki	4 January 1998 (age 27)	0	0	(Hungary) Paksi FC
17	MF	Ronald Takács	26 January 1998 (age 27)	0	0	(Hungary) MTK Budapest FC
18	MF	Alex Svedjuk	11 July 1996 (age 28)	0	0	(Hungary) Békéscsaba 1912 Előre
19	DF	Sándor Szidor	17 June 1999 (age 25)	0	0	(Hungary) Tarpa SC

== Technical staff ==
Position	Name
Manager	(Hungary) István Sándor
Assistant manager	(Hungary) Istvan Marton
Coach	(Hungary) Krisztiján Mile
Coach	(Hungary) József Dörfler
Physio	(Hungary) Róbert Andrejcsák

== Honours ==
=== Non-FIFA competitions ===
- CONIFA World Football Cup
  - Champions (1): 2018

== See also ==
- Felvidék football team
- Székely Land football team
