= Canton Ticino football team =

Unofficial national football team representing Ticino, Switzerland

Canton Ticino
- Association: Canton Ticino Football Association
- Confederation: ConIFA
- Head coach: Daniele Marchi
- Top scorer: Viola Sánchez (1)

First international
- Canton Ticino 1–8 Raetia (Tenero-Contra, Switzerland; 17 June 2023)

Biggest win
- Rouet-Provence 0–1 Canton Ticino (Carate Brianza, Italy; 2 June 2026)

Biggest defeat
- Canton Ticino 1–8 Raetia (Tenero-Contra, Switzerland; 17 June 2023)

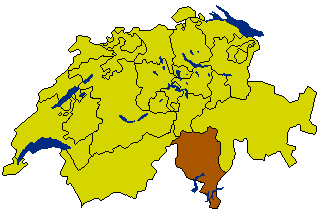
Map of Switzerland, with Ticino in orange

The Canton Ticino football team is a team representing the Swiss canton of Ticino (/tɪˈtʃiːnoʊ/ tih-CHEE-no) in association football. It is a member of ConIFA, an umbrella association for states, minorities, stateless peoples and regions unaffiliated with FIFA.

== History ==
Canton Ticino joined ConIFA in 2022. The ConIFA site describes Ticino as "a Canton and a Republic", noting that Ticinese are a cultural and ethnic minority in Switzerland as the only Italian-speaking canton.

It was named as one of the reserve sides for the 2023 CONIFA European Football Cup; Ticino may take the place of a team if they withdraw from the competition.

Canton Ticino participated in the 2024 CONIFA World Cup Qualification, drawn in Group B against Raetia. Their only match in the tournament would be a 8–1 defeat, knocking Canton Ticino out. Their only goalscorer in the competition was Viola Sanchez. A few months later, they played Raetia again, this time in the Benedikt Fontana Cup. They lost again, this time 5-1. In November 2023 Ticino were selected for the 2024 CONIFA World Football Cup, which was scheduled to take place in Iraqi Kurdistan in 2024. Canton Ticino played their third game against Padania in Verano Brianza, and would lose the game 5-0.

=== ConIFA World Football Cup ===
ConIFA World Football Cup Record
Year	Round	Position	GP	W	D	L	GS	GA
(Sápmi) 2014	Not a CONIFA member							
(Abkhazia) 2016	Not a CONIFA member							
(Barawa) 2018	Not a CONIFA member							
(Kurdistan Region) 2024	Qualified, later cancelled							

== International Fixtures & Results ==
17 June 2023 CONIFA World Cup Qualifier	Canton Ticino	1–8	Raetia	Brochini-CST Stadium, Tenero-Contra

6 August 2023 Benedikt Fontana Cup	Raetia	5-1	Canton Ticino	Domat/Ems

2024 Friendly	Padania	5-0	Canton Ticino	Verano Brianza

2 June 2026 2026 CONIFA European Football Cup	Rouet-Provence	0–1	Canton Ticino	Carate Brianza, Italy
14:00			Garcia 58'	Stadium: Verano Stadium

3 June 2026 2026 CONIFA European Football Cup	Canton Ticino	1-5	Northern Cyprus	Carate Brianza, Italy
17:30	Moccetti 88' (pen.)		Şöför 44', 46'; Sezer 48'; Güçlucan 63'; Oshan 87'	Stadium: Verano Stadium

== Players ==
=== Current squad ===
The following 23 players were called up for the 2026 CONIFA European Football Cup, to be played in Verano Brianza, Italy from 2 to 6 June 2026.

No.	Pos.	Player	Date of birth (age)	Caps	Goals	Club
	GK	Manuel Aiello	8 January 2003 (age 23)	0	0	(Swiss Football Association) Paradiso
	GK	Jordan Scaccia	2006	0	0	(Swiss Football Association) Paradiso Reserves
	GK	Anthony Moccetti	2009	0	0	(Swiss Football Association) Paradiso Reserves
	DF	Luca Benedetto	11 February 2002 (age 24)	0	0	(Swiss Football Association) Paradiso Reserves
	DF	Anas Houssni	18 February 2004 (age 22)	0	0	(Swiss Football Association) Paradiso Reserves
	DF	Giovanni D’Aprile	1 July 2005 (age 20)	0	0	(Swiss Football Association) Paradiso
	DF	Stefan Mitrovic	4 August 2004 (age 21)	0	0	(Swiss Football Association) Paradiso Reserves
	DF	Diego Giovannacci	2002	0	0	(Swiss Football Association) Paradiso Reserves
	DF	Marco Capra	2007	0	0	(Swiss Football Association) Paradiso Reserves
	DF	Aldo Capocasale	2 August 2004 (age 21)	0	0	(Swiss Football Association) Paradiso Reserves
	MF	Arian Al Jamur	11 June 2008 (age 17)	0	0	(Swiss Football Association) Paradiso Reserves
	MF	Nicolò Pirrello	26 January 2001 (age 25)	0	0	(Swiss Football Association) Paradiso Reserves
	MF	Nelu Bejeranu (captain)	4 December 2009 (age 16)	0	0	(Swiss Football Association) Paradiso Reserves
	MF	Hamza Ennaour	9 October 1999 (age 26)	0	0	(Swiss Football Association) Paradiso Reserves
	MF	Alessandro Ambrosone	2003	0	0	(Swiss Football Association) Paradiso Reserves
	MF	Rayan Hemidach	12 August 2007 (age 18)	0	0	(Swiss Football Association) Paradiso Reserves
	MF	Miguel Ángel Montes	6 November 2004 (age 21)	0	0	(Swiss Football Association) Paradiso
	FW	Fabio Vasta	11 July 1988 (age 37)	0	0	(Italian Football Federation) Camuna
	FW	Federico Milano	8 April 2003 (age 23)	0	0	(Swiss Football Association) US Semine
	FW	Mathias Kombaté	24 March 1982 (age 44)	0	0	Retired
	FW	Adama Guem		0	0	
	FW	Filippo Mancuso	28 April 2001 (age 25)	0	0	(Swiss Football Association) Bioggio
	FW	James Minoggio	3 September 1984 (age 41)	0	0	

== See also ==
- Raetia football team
