= Székely Land football team =

Unofficial national football team representing the region of Székely Land

Székely Land
- Nickname: Székelyek
- Association: Székelyföld Labdarúgó Egyesület (SZFE)
- Confederation: ConIFA
- Head coach: József Gazda
First colours

First international
- Kárpátalja 0–5 Székely Land (Berehovo; 16 August 2014)

Biggest win
- Somaliland 3–10 Székely Land (Gagra; 3 June 2016); Székely Land 7-0 Two Sicilies (Csíkszereda; 2 July 2023)

Biggest defeat
- Székely Land 0–5 Western Armenia (Askeran; 3 June 2019)

World Cup
- Appearances: CONIFA World Football Cup
- Best result: 4th 2018
- Appearances: CONIFA European Football Cup
- Best result: 3rd 2017

The Székely Land football team (Hungarian: Székely labdarúgó-válogatott) is a team representing Székely Land, a historic and ethnographic region in eastern Transylvania, in central Romania, inhabited mainly by the Székelys, a subgroup of the Hungarian people. It is a member of ConIFA, an umbrella association for states, minorities, and regions unaffiliated with FIFA.

== Székelyföld Labdarúgó Egyesület ==
The Székelyföld Labdarúgó Egyesület is the football association of Székely Land.

== History ==
The association named Székelyföld Labdarúgó Egyesület (English: Székely Land Football Association) was founded in 2013 at Budapest, Hungary on the initiative of Kristóf Wenczel, a sports lawyer by profession. In January 2014, the Székelyföld Labdarúgó Egyesület was admitted to the N.F.-Board, an organisation consisting of teams that represent nations, dependencies, unrecognized states, minorities, stateless peoples, regions and micronations not affiliated to FIFA; and afterwards, they became a member of the newly founded ConIFA.

In 2023, they participated in the 2024 CONIFA World Cup Qualifiers. They were placed in Group C with Chameria and Two Sicilies. Sekler Land won both matches, 3-2 and 7-0 respectively, and qualified for the tournament.

== Tournament records ==
=== ConIFA World Football Cup record ===
Year	Position	GP	W	D	L	GS	GA
(Sápmi) 2014	did not enter						
(Abkhazia) 2016	9th place	4	2	0	2	17	7
(Ogaden) 2018	4th place	6	3	1	2	16	7
(North Macedonia) 2020	Cancelled						
(Kurdistan Region) 2024	Partially cancelled. Classified	2	2	0	0	10	2
Total	0 titles	12	7	1	4	43	16

=== ConIFA European Football Cup record ===
Year	Position	GP	W	D	L	GS	GA
(Hungary) 2015	6th place	3	0	0	3	5	10
(Northern Cyprus) 2017	3rd place	5	2	1	2	9	7
(Republic of Artsakh) 2019	8th place	5	0	1	4	5	16
(County of Nice) 2022	Cancelled						
(Northern Cyprus) 2023	Cancelled						
(Padania) 2026	Did not enter						
Total	0 titles	13	2	2	9	19	33

== Current squad ==
The following players were called up for the 2019 CONIFA European Football Cup.

No.	Pos.	Player	Date of birth (age)	Caps	Goals	Club
1	GK	Levente Mihok	27 May 1982 (aged 37)	0	0	(Romanian Football Federation) ACS Olimpic Cetate Râșnov
2	DF	Hunor Ghinea	24 February 1999 (aged 20)	0	0	(Romanian Football Federation) KSE Târgu Secuiesc
3	DF	Robert Oprea	10 June 1988 (aged 30)	4	0	(Romanian Football Federation) SK Nyárádszereda
4	DF	Norbert Lazar	27 April 1989 (aged 30)	0	0	(Romanian Football Federation) Baróti VSC
5	MF	István Hadnagy	19 September 1996 (aged 22)	4	1	(Romanian Football Federation) Malomfalvi Fiatalság
6	MF	Norbert-Cristian Albu	1 November 1996 (aged 22)	0	0	(Romanian Football Federation) KSE Târgu Secuiesc
7	MF	Barna Vékás	12 August 1994 (aged 24)	6	5	(Romanian Football Federation) AFC Odorheiu Secuiesc
8	MF	Csaba Dézsi	13 December 1989 (aged 29)	4	0	(Romanian Football Federation) AFC Odorheiu Secuiesc
9	FW	Ákos Kovács	22 March 1983 (aged 36)	8	1	(Romanian Football Federation) AFC Odorheiu Secuiesc
10	MF	Mozes Peter	30 December 1984 (aged 34)	8	2	(Romanian Football Federation) AFC Odorheiu Secuiesc
11	FW	Szilárd Magyari	20 May 1998 (aged 21)	9	6	(Romanian Football Federation) FK Miercurea Ciuc
12	GK	Attila Farkas	22 March 1999 (aged 20)	0	0	(Romanian Football Federation) KSE Târgu Secuiesc
13	FW	Attila Lazar	10 July 1989 (aged 29)	0	0	(Romanian Football Federation) Baróti VSC
14	DF	Árpád Rózsa	18 June 1989 (aged 29)	15	0	Free agent
15	DF	Norbert Benkő-Bíró	8 October 1992 (aged 26)	14	1	(Hungarian Football Federation) Salgótarjáni BTC
16	MF	Tankó Előd	13 July 1995 (aged 23)	0	0	(Romanian Football Federation) AFC Odorheiu Secuiesc
17	FW	Barna Bajkó	16 May 1984 (aged 35)	13	10	(Romanian Football Federation) FK Miercurea Ciuc
18	MF	József Gazda	26 October 1982 (aged 36)	14	0	(Romanian Football Federation) KSE Târgu Secuiesc
19	MF	Botond Kovács	10 September 1996 (aged 22)	0	0	(Hungarian Football Federation) Szolnoki MÁV FC
20	MF	Attila Gall	2 June 1996 (aged 22)	0	0	(Romanian Football Federation) KSE Târgu Secuiesc
21	MF	Gothard Gajdo	17 July 1991 (aged 27)	0	0	(Romanian Football Federation) KSE Târgu Secuiesc
22	FW	Rajmond Bálint	8 December 1993 (aged 25)	1	0	(Romanian Football Federation) AFC Odorheiu Secuiesc
23	FW	Norbert János	30 May 1998 (aged 21)	0	0	(Romanian Football Federation) FC Universitatea Cluj

== Notable former players ==
The footballers enlisted below have played for Székely Land at least at one ConIFA World Football Cup or ConIFA European Football Cup and have had played at the top level.

- Balázs Csiszér
- Csaba Csizmadia
- István Fülöp
- Lóránd Fülöp
- Róbert Ilyés
- Szabolcs Kilyén
- László Szőcs

== Managers ==
The following managers have been the head coach of Székely Land at least at one ConIFA World Football Cup or ConIFA European Football Cup.

- Róbert Ilyés
- József Gazda
- Zoltán Jakab

== Honours ==
=== Non-FIFA competitions ===
- CONIFA European Football Cup
  - Third place (1): 2017
