= Jan Dam (footballer) =

Faroese footballer

Personal information
- Full name: Jan Christian Dam
- Date of birth: 7 September 1968 (age 58)
- Place of birth: Faroe Islands
- Height: 1.77 m (5 ft 10 in)
- Position: Defender

Senior career*
Years	Team	Apps	(Gls)
1986–1995	HB Tórshavn	144	(22)
1995–1996	Ølstykke FC		
1996	KÍ Klaksvík	8	(1)
1997–1999	HB	37	(1)
2000–2001	B68 Toftir	30	(0)
2002–2004	HB	35	(0)
Total		254	(24)

International career
1990–2000	Faroe Islands	39	(1)
- * Club domestic league appearances and goals

Jan Dam (born 7 September 1968) is a Faroese former professional footballer who played as a defender. At present, he works as a teacher at a Faroese public school and also as a reserve team coach at the football club EB/Streymur.

== Club career ==
Dam made his debut in Faroese football at the age of 17 with HB Tórshavn as a defender in the 1986 season and remained with the club for ten years before he moved abroad to Danish side Ølstykke FC. He returned home after only one season to join KÍ Klaksvík and later HB again and B68.

== International career ==
Dam made his debut for the Faroe Islands in an August 1990 friendly match against Iceland in which he immediately scored from the penalty spot after coming on as a substitute for Abraham Løkin Hansen. The penalty was awarded after foul on Jan. His second match was the 1–0 defeat of Austria, his country's first competitive match. On his third international duty, away to Denmark, he set Brian Laudrup out of the game, despite Faroes losing the match 4–1. His last international match was an April 2000 friendly against Liechtenstein. Dam collected 39 caps, scoring one goal.

== Career statistics ==
Scores and results list Faroe Islands' goal tally first, score column indicates score after each Dam goal.

List of international goals scored by Jan Dam
No.	Date	Venue	Opponent	Score	Result	Competition
1	8 August 1990	Gundadalur, Tórshavn, Faroes	Iceland	2-2	2-3	Friendly
