= Football at the 1995 Island Games =

Men's Football at the Island Games 1995
Tournament details
- Host country: Gibraltar
- Dates: 16–22 July
- Teams: 8

Final positions
- Champions: Isle of Wight (1st title)
- Runners-up: Gibraltar
- Third place: Jersey
- Fourth place: Greenland

Tournament statistics
- Matches played: 18
- Goals scored: 58 (3.22 per match)
- Top scorer: (Isle of Wight) Adam Barsdell (4 goals)

Football was contested as part of the programme for the 1995 Island Games which was hosted in Gibraltar from 15 to 22 July 1995. It was the fourth edition of the men's football tournament at the multi-sport event organised by the International Island Games Association.

The football tournament began with the first matches in the group stage on 16 July 1995 and ended with the gold medal match on 22 July 1995. The Isle of Wight and hosts Gibraltar contested the final. The Isle of Wight defeated Gibraltar 1–0 to win the gold medal. In the bronze medal match, defending champions Jersey defeated Greenland 6–3 after extra time.

== Background ==
A five-a-side youth football tournament was held at the inaugural games in 1985 held in Douglas, Isle of Man but football was completely absent from the programme at the 1987 Island Games held in Guernsey. The first men's football tournament was held at the 1989 Island Games in the Faroe Islands. The Faroe Islands won the first two editions undefeated but have not competed since their win at the 1991 Island Games in Åland. Jersey were the defending champions after defeating the Isle of Man 5–1 in the gold medal match at the 1993 Island Games held on the Isle of Wight.

== Format ==
Eight teams took part in the competition. They were drawn into two single round robin groups of four teams. The group winners and runners-up would contest the semi-finals which would decide the teams contesting the gold and bronze medal matches. Play-off placement matches were held for the teams finishing third and fourth in each group – the third-placed teams contested the fifth-place match and the fourth-placed teams contested the seventh-place match.

=== Participants ===
- Åland
- Greenland
- Gibraltar
- Guernsey
- Isle of Wight
- Isle of Man
- Jersey
- Ynys Môn

== Group phase ==
=== Group 1 ===
Greenland and Gibraltar to progress to the semi-finals head of Ynys Môn on goal difference.

Pos	Team	Pld	W	D	L	GF	GA	GD	Pts	Qualification
1	Greenland	3	2	0	1	6	2	+4	4	Qualification for the semi-finals
2	Gibraltar	3	2	0	1	4	2	+2	4	Qualification for the semi-finals
3	Ynys Môn	3	2	0	1	4	3	+1	4	Qualification for the fifth-place match
4	Isle of Man	3	0	0	3	1	8	−7	0	Qualification for the seventh-place match

16 July

Isle of Man	0–2	Ynys Môn
		C. Redmayn; D. Barker

16 July

Gibraltar	0–1	Greenland
		Johanesen

17 July

Gibraltar	2–1	Isle of Man

17 July

Greenland	1–2	Ynys Môn
Janissen		Williams; Hughes

18 July

Gibraltar	2–0	Ynys Môn
Castle (2)

18 July

Greenland	4–0	Isle of Man
J. Nielsen (2); Muller; A. Nielsen

=== Group 2 ===
Jersey won all three of their games to progress to the semi-finals alongside the Isle of Wight.

Pos	Team	Pld	W	D	L	GF	GA	GD	Pts	Qualification
1	Jersey	3	3	0	0	6	1	+5	6	Qualification for the semi-finals
2	Isle of Wight	3	1	1	1	6	3	+3	3	Qualification for the semi-finals
3	Guernsey	3	0	2	1	3	4	−1	2	Qualification for the fifth-place match
4	Åland	3	0	1	2	3	10	−7	1	Qualification for the seventh-place match

16 July

Jersey	2–0	Isle of Wight
M. Strafford; A. Greig

16 July

Åland	2–2	Guernsey
Straudfult; Gustafsson		Chalmers; Ogier

17 July

Åland	0–5	Isle of Wight
		Sperry; Barsdell (2); Plenty; Raggett

17 July

Jersey	1–0	Guernsey
Barker

18 July

Jersey	3–1	Åland
Perez; Brown; de Freitas		Skogberg

18 July

Isle of Wight	1–1	Guernsey
Watson		Vance

== Placement play-off matches ==
=== Seventh-place match ===
Åland defeated the Isle of Man in the seventh-place match.

21 July

Åland	4–1	Isle of Man
Overstron; Gustafsson; Andersson (2)		Williams

=== Fifth-place match ===
Guernsey defeated Ynys Môn in the seventh-place match.

21 July

Guernsey	4–2	Ynys Môn
Renouf; Deport (2); Galliene		Williams; Turner

== Semi-finals ==
The Isle of White defeated Greenland and Gibraltar defeated Jersey in the semi-finals.

20 July

Greenland	1–2	Isle of Wight
Muller		Barsdell (2)

20 July

Gibraltar	1–0	Jersey
Campos (o.g.)

== Bronze medal match ==
Jersey defeated Greenland in the bronze medal match.

21 July

Jersey	6–3 (a.e.t.)	Greenland
Greig (2); Morton; Perez; Daley; Peebles		Petersen; A. Nielsen; J. Nielsen

== Gold medal match ==
The Isle of Wight defeated Gibraltar in the bronze medal match.

22 July

Gibraltar	0–1	Isle of Wight

== Final rankings ==
Rank	Team
Gold medal	Isle of Wight
Silver medal	Gibraltar
Bronze medal	Jersey
4	Greenland
5	Guernsey
6	Ynys Môn
7	Åland
8	Isle of Man

== Top goalscorers ==
4 goals

- (Isle of Wight) Adam Barsdell
