= Hawaii men's official soccer team =

Soccer team representing Hawaiʻi

Hawai‘i
- Nickname: Nā ‘Ālapa Hawai‘i
- Association: Hui Kanaka Pōwāwae (Hawaiian Football)
- Confederation: ConIFA
- Website: https://hawaiianfootball.com/

The Hawaii national soccer team is a team representing the people of the Hawaiian Islands, located in the central Pacific Ocean. They are not affiliated with FIFA, CONCACAF or OFC (as they instead recognize the United States men's national soccer team as having jurisdiction over the region), and therefore cannot compete for the FIFA World Cup, the CONCACAF Gold Cup or the OFC Nations Cup. Instead, they are part of ConIFA and compete in their competitions.

== History ==
The flag of the defunct Hawaiian Kingdom, and now U.S. state of Hawaii, is used as one of the symbols of the soccer team.

Hawaii joined ConIFA on November 28, 2019, under the principle that "Hawaiʻi is a sovereign nation-state in continuity, under prolonged occupation by the United States." As of 2023, Hawaii are the only Oceanian CONIFA member, therefore were granted a spot in the 2024 CONIFA World Football Cup, but declined.

== Organization ==
The Hui Kanaka Pōwāwae (Hawaiian Football) is the soccer (association football) association of Hawaii.

== See also ==
- Hawaiian sovereignty movement
- Hawaiian Kingdom
