= 2022 CONIFA European Football Cup =

Tournament details
- Host country: Nice; France
- Dates: 3–12 June 2022
- Teams: 12

The 2021 Sportsbet.io CONIFA European Football Cup, later renamed CONIFA Euro 2022 is the planned fourth edition of the CONIFA European Football Cup, an international football tournament for states, minorities, stateless peoples and regions unaffiliated with FIFA with an affiliation to Europe, organised by CONIFA. It was to be hosted by Nice in France.

Initially to be played from 9 to 19 June, it was postponed to 7–17 July due to the ongoing pandemic, and finally cancelled on 6 May 2021. The organisers stated that they were hoping to make a decision to hold the competition in 2022, by August 2022. On 10 January 2022, CONIFA announced on social media, that the competition would be taking place between 3–12 June 2022 and had been renamed CONIFA Euro 2022 - in Nice as previously planned.

Less than 1 month before the tournament was due to begin CONIFA announced organisation problems with regards to hosts Nice. The tournament was not officially declared cancelled, but no alternative host was announced.

== Tournament ==
=== Venues ===
County of Nice

Nice

Stade de Nice
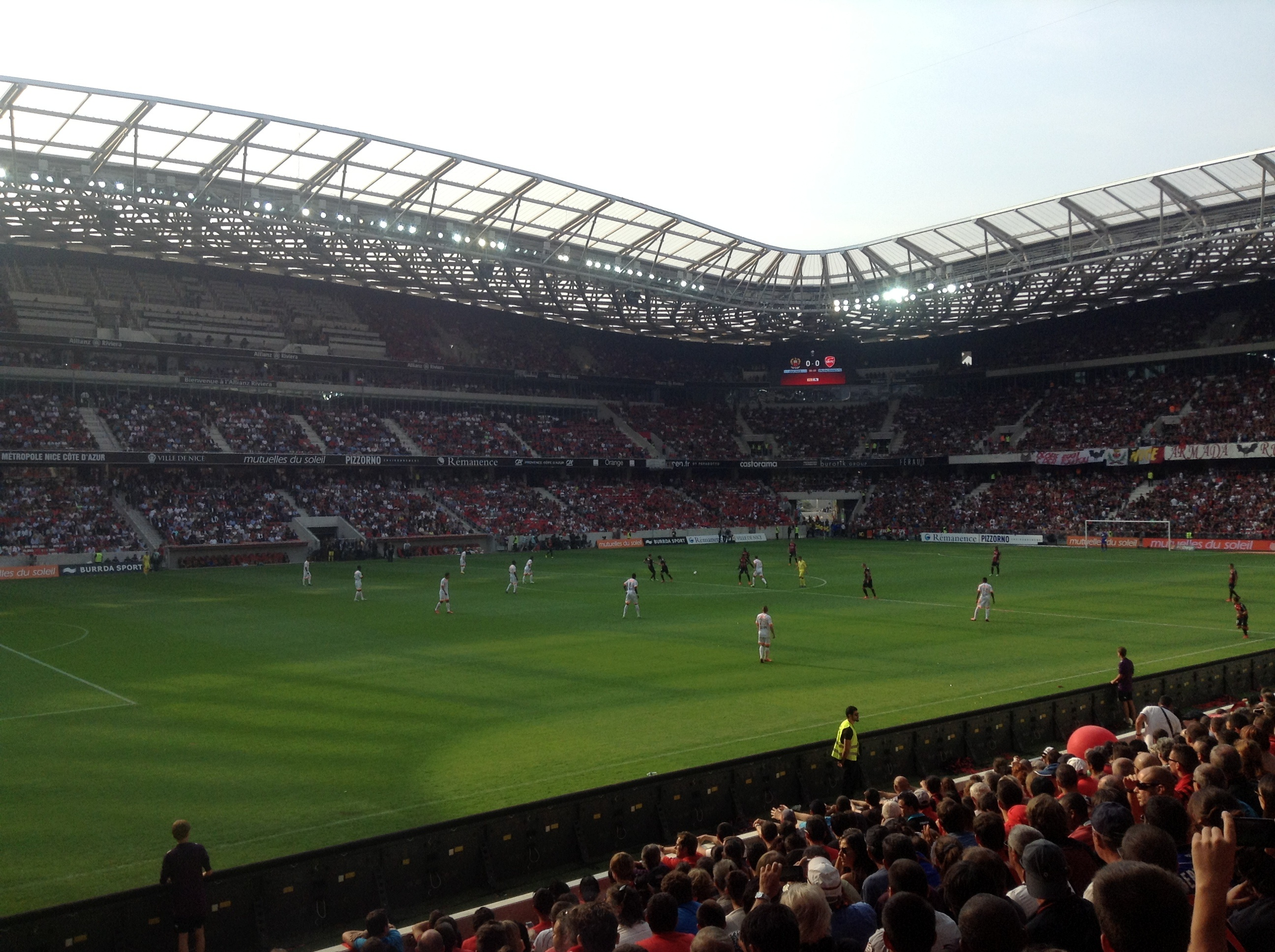

Capacity: 38,223

== Participants ==
A total of twelve teams were scheduled to participate, with their seedings below.

Pot 1	Pot 2	Pot 3
County of Nice; South Ossetia; Padania; Abkhazia	Sápmi; Western Armenia; Two Sicilies; Artsakh	Székely Land; Chameria; TBD; Cornwall

Northern Cyprus withdrew from the tournament after the draw. It was replaced by a reserve team of the tournament, Two Sicilies.

There are two additional reserve teams in case further teams withdraw from the tournament, Kárpátalja and Romani people.

In April 2022, Abkhazia, South Ossetia and Chameria all withdrew. The official reason given was "organizational issues". They were replaced by Kárpátalja, Elba Island and Sicily.

In May 2022, Sardinia withdrew from the tournament due to "safety reasons".

== Matches ==
=== Group stage ===
Key to colours in group tables
Teams that advanced to the quarter-finals

==== Group A ====
Team	Pld	W	D	L	GF	GA	GD	Pts
County of Nice	0	0	0	0	0	0	0	0
Two Sicilies	0	0	0	0	0	0	0	0
TBD	0	0	0	0	0	0	0	0

Source: "Groups of the CONIFA European Football Cup". Archived from the original on 2021-03-17.
3 June 2022

County of Nice	v	Two Sicilies

5 June 2022

County of Nice	v	TBD

6 June 2022

TBD	v	Two Sicilies

==== Group B ====
Team	Pld	W	D	L	GF	GA	GD	Pts
Sicily	0	0	0	0	0	0	0	0
Sápmi	0	0	0	0	0	0	0	0
Székely Land	0	0	0	0	0	0	0	0

Source: "Groups of the CONIFA European Football Cup". Archived from the original on 2021-03-17.
4 June 2022

Sicily	v	Sápmi

5 June 2022

Sicily	v	Székely Land

6 June 2022

Sápmi	v	Székely Land

==== Group C ====
Team	Pld	W	D	L	GF	GA	GD	Pts
Elba Island	0	0	0	0	0	0	0	0
Artsakh	0	0	0	0	0	0	0	0
Cornwall	0	0	0	0	0	0	0	0

Source: "Groups of the CONIFA European Football Cup". Archived from the original on 2021-03-17.
4 June 2022

Elba Island	v	Artsakh

5 June 2022

Elba Island	v	Cornwall

6 June 2022

Artsakh	v	Cornwall

==== Group D ====
Team	Pld	W	D	L	GF	GA	GD	Pts
Padania	0	0	0	0	0	0	0	0
Western Armenia	0	0	0	0	0	0	0	0
Kárpátalja	0	0	0	0	0	0	0	0

Source: "Groups of the CONIFA European Football Cup". Archived from the original on 2021-03-17.
3 June 2022

Padania	v	Western Armenia

4 June 2022

Padania	v	Kárpátalja

6 June 2022

Western Armenia	v	Kárpátalja

=== Knockout stage ===
Quarter-finals
8 June – Nice
?
?
8 June – Nice
?
?
8 June – Nice
?
?
8 June – Nice
?
?

Semi-finals
10 June – Nice
?
?
10 June – Nice
?
?

Final
12 June – Nice
?
?
Third place
12 June – Nice
?
?

==== Quarter-finals ====
8 June 2022

v

8 June 2022

v

8 June 2022

v

8 June 2022

v

==== Semi-finals ====
10 June 2022

v

10 June 2022

v

==== Third-place play-off ====
12 June 2022

v

==== Final ====
12 June 2022

v

Stade de Nice, Nice

=== Placement round ===
==== Placement round 1 ====
June 2022

v

June 2022

v

June 2022

v

June 2022

v

==== Placement round 2 ====
June 2022

v

June 2022

v

June 2022

v

June 2022

v

== Final positions ==
Pos	Team	Pld	W	D	L	GF	GA	GD	Pts
1	?	0	0	0	0	0	0	0	0
2	?	0	0	0	0	0	0	0	0
3	?	0	0	0	0	0	0	0	0
4	?	0	0	0	0	0	0	0	0
5	?	0	0	0	0	0	0	0	0
6	?	0	0	0	0	0	0	0	0
7	?	0	0	0	0	0	0	0	0
8	?	0	0	0	0	0	0	0	0
9	?	0	0	0	0	0	0	0	0
10	?	0	0	0	0	0	0	0	0
11	?	0	0	0	0	0	0	0	0
12	?	0	0	0	0	0	0	0	0
