= Football at the 1993 Island Games =

Men's Football at the Island Games 1993
Tournament details
- Host country: Isle of Wight
- Dates: 4–9 July
- Teams: 8

Final positions
- Champions: Jersey (1st title)
- Runners-up: Isle of Man
- Third place: Åland
- Fourth place: Greenland

Tournament statistics
- Matches played: 16
- Goals scored: 49 (3.06 per match)
- Top scorer(s): (Jersey) Adam Greig (7 goals)

The 1993 Island Games on the Isle of Wight was the 3rd edition in which a men's football tournament was played at the multi-games competition. It was contested by 8 teams.

Jersey won the tournament for the first time.

== Participants ==
- Åland
- Greenland
- Gibraltar
- Isle of Wight
- Isle of Man
- Jersey
- Shetland
- Ynys Môn

== Group phase ==
=== Group 1 ===
Rank	Nation	Pld	W	D	L	GF	GA	Pts	GD
1	Jersey	3	2	1	0	8	5	7	+3
2	Greenland	3	2	0	1	8	4	6	+4
3	Ynys Môn	3	1	1	1	3	3	4	0
4	Gibraltar	3	0	0	3	1	8	0	−7

4 July

Gibraltar	1–2	Jersey
Laglella ?'		Greig ?' de Freitas ?'

4 July

Ynys Môn	0–1	Greenland
		Nielsen ?'

5 July

Jersey	4–2	Greenland
Greig ?', ?', ?', ?'		Nielsen ?'; Janussen ?'

5 July

Ynys Môn	1–0	Gibraltar
Humphreys ?'

6 July

Greenland	5–0	Gibraltar
Gabrielsen ?', ?'; Janussen ?', ?'; Nielsen ?'

6 July

Jersey	2–2	Ynys Môn
Greig ?', ?'		Roberts ?'; Baker ?'

=== Group 2 ===
Rank	Nation	Pld	W	D	L	GF	GA	Pts	GD
1	Isle of Man	3	2	0	1	7	2	6	+5
2	Åland	3	2	0	1	5	3	6	+2
3	Isle of Wight	3	2	0	1	3	2	6	+1
4	Shetland	3	0	0	3	2	10	0	−8

4 July

Isle of Wight	1–0	Isle of Man
McArthur ?'

4 July

Åland	3–1	Shetland
Nordström ?', ?'; Henriksson ?'		Odie ?'

5 July

Isle of Man	2–0	Åland
Langridge ?'; Bramwell ?'

5 July

Isle of Wight	2–0	Shetland
Watson ?'; Simpson ?'

6 July

Shetland	1–5	Isle of Man
Williamson ?'		Bass ?', ?'; Langridge ?'; Wakenshaw ?'; West ?' (o.g.)

6 July

Isle of Wight	0–2	Åland
		Henriksson ?'; Söderdahl ?'

== Placement play-off matches ==
=== 7th place match ===
8 July

Shetland	1–0	Gibraltar
Goal

=== 5th place match ===
8 July

Isle of Wight	1–1	Ynys Môn
Goal		Goal

=== 3rd Place Match ===
9 July

Greenland	1–2	Åland
Goal		Goal

== Final ==
9 July

Jersey	5–1	Isle of Man
Goal		Goal

1993 Island Games Winners
Jersey
First Title

== Final rankings ==
Rank	Team
Gold medal	Jersey
Silver medal	Isle of Man
Bronze medal	Åland
4	Greenland
5	Isle of Wight
6	Ynys Môn
7	Shetland
8	Gibraltar

== Top goalscorers ==
7 goals

- (Jersey) Adam Greig*

3 goals

- (Greenland) Nielsen*
- (Greenland) Janussen*

* May have scored more
