= Nassim Mendil =

French former professional footballer (born 1979)

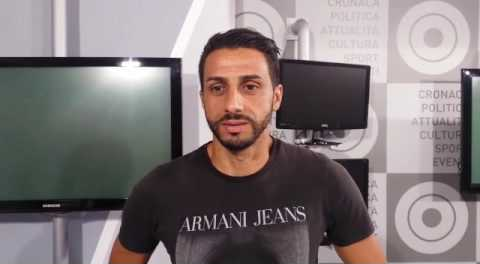
- Mendil in 2018

Personal information
- Date of birth: 27 March 1979 (age 47)
- Place of birth: Rognac, France
- Height: 1.80 m (5 ft 11 in)
- Position: Striker

Youth career
- Bastia

Senior career*
Years	Team	Apps	(Gls)
1998–2000	Bastia	1	(0)
2000–	Avellino	16	(5)
2001	Lecco	8	(2)
2001–2002	Cosenza	30	(10)
2002–	Catania	6	(0)
2003	Ascoli	11	(1)
2003–2004	Spezia	26	(2)
2004–2005	Salernitana	17	(2)
2005–2007	Ancona	46	(11)
2007–2008	Pro Sesto	25	(6)
2008–2009	Paganese	10	(0)
2009	Eupen	13	(3)
2009–2010	Villacidrese	8	(1)
Total		217	(43)
- * Club domestic league appearances and goals

Nassim Mendil (born 27 March 1979) is a French Algerian former professional footballer who played striker.

== Club career ==
Born in Rognac, France, Mendil began his career in the SC Bastia academy, which he joined at the age of 15. On 22 February 1999, he made his first team debut for Bastia, coming as a second-half substitute against Toulouse FC in the 25th week of Ligue 1 action. It would be his only first team appearance after a contract dispute with the club. He spent one more season with the club's reserve team, scoring 24 goals, before leaving to Italy to join US Avellino in Serie C1. After just half a season with the club, he was signed by another Serie C1 team Lecco.

In his second season in Italy, Mendil joined Serie B side Cosenza, playing alongside former A.C. Milan striker Gianluigi Lentini and scoring 10 goals. His performances that season did not go unnoticed and he was linked with moves to a number of clubs including English clubs Fulham and West Ham United, and Italian clubs Atalanta and Reggina both playing in Serie A at the time. In the summer of 2002, he signed a 5-year contract with Reggina.

After signing with Reggina, Mendil was loaned out a number of times, spending time with Catania, Ascoli, Spezia Calcio 1906 and Salernitana. Since then, he has also played for AC Ancona and A.C. Pro Sesto. Mendil scored six goals for Pro Sesto in Serie C1 during the 2007–08 season.

In the summer of 2008, he signed with Serie C1 team Paganese Calcio 1926. but in January 2009 he joined Belgian Second Division team Eupen.

In the summer of 2010 he signed with Serie D team Bacoli.

== International career ==
Mendil was contacted several times by then Algerian head coach Rabah Madjer to play in the Algerian National Team in a friendly against Belgium. Mendil asked Madjer for some time to consider the call-up and eventually declined to allow him to deal with his transfer situation. He was called up a second time for a friendly, but his club never received the invitation. He has not been called up again since.
