= 2026 CONIFA European Football Cup =

Tournament details
- Host country: Padania (official); Italy (location)
- Dates: 2–6 June 2026
- Teams: 6
- Venues: 2 (in 1 host city)

Final positions
- Champions: Northern Cyprus
- Runners-up: Padania
- Third place: Greenland
- Fourth place: Canton Ticino

Tournament statistics
- Matches played: 9
- Goals scored: 43 (4.78 per match)
- Top scorer: (Northern Cyprus) Erhun Oztumer (4)

The 2026 CONIFA European Football Cup was the fourth edition of this tournament, an international football tournament for states, minorities, stateless peoples and regions unaffiliated with FIFA with an affiliation to Europe, organised by CONIFA. The edition will be the first since 2019, with editions in 2021 and 2023, both being cancelled.

== Participants ==
Team	Previous appearances in tournament (Note: Bold indicates champion for that year. Italic indicates host for that year.)
Canton Ticino	0 (debut)
Greenland	0 (debut)
Northern Cyprus	1 (2017)
Padania	3 (**2015**, **2017**, 2019)
Raetia	0 (debut)
Rouet-Provence	0 (debut)

=== Draw ===
The draw is scheduled to take place during the CONIFA AGM on April 18, 2026, in Lefkosa, Northern Cyprus. Teams were divided into 3 pots for the draw and would be split between 2 3-team groups. While not directly confirmed by CONIFA, pots are thought to be based on the 2025 European rankings.

Pot 1	Pot 2	Pot 3
Raetia; Rouet-Provence	Canton Ticino; Padania	Greenland; Northern Cyprus

=== Format ===
Six teams will be divided into two groups of three teams. The two group winners will progress to the final, the two runners-ups will progress to a third-place match; a fifth-place game is scheduled as a friendly and not officially as part of the tournament.

== Venues ==
Two venues are being used to hold fixtures at the tournament, both in the same area known as the Sportitalia Village. The 3,000 capacity Stadio XXV Aprile, also known as the Carate Stadium or Sportitalia Arena for sponsorship reasons, home of Serie D side US Folgore Caratese ASD is being used as the main venue for the tournament. The neighbouring Stadio Comunale Verano Brianza, or Verano Stadium, is also being used to host matches.

== Group stage ==
=== Group A ===
Pos	Team	Pld	W	D	L	GF	GA	GD	Pts	Qualification
1	Padania	2	2	0	0	7	2	+5	6	Advanced to final
2	Greenland	2	1	0	1	5	4	+1	3	Advanced to third place match
3	Raetia	2	0	0	2	2	8	−6	0	Advanced to fifth place match

First match(es) will be played: 2 June 2026. Source:
2 June 2026
18:15

Raetia	1–4	Padania
Roffler 84'		Colombo 23'; Montalbano 28'; Pozzoni 86', 90+8'

Carate Stadium, Carate Brianza, Italy
3 June 2026
14:30

Padania	3–1	Greenland
Ravasi 36'; Colombo 56'; Rossetti 86'		Ejler 55'

Verano Stadium, Carate Brianza, Italy
4 June 2026
14:30

Raetia	1–4	Greenland
Agaei 85'		Eriksen Petersen 1'; Johansen 33'; Gundel-Collin 53'; B. Rosing 59'

Verano Stadium, Carate Brianza, Italy

=== Group B ===
Pos	Team	Pld	W	D	L	GF	GA	GD	Pts	Qualification
1	Northern Cyprus	2	2	0	0	9	1	+8	6	Advanced to final
2	Canton Ticino	2	1	0	1	2	5	−3	3	Advanced to third place match
3	Rouet-Provence	2	0	0	2	0	5	−5	0	Advanced to fifth place match

Updated to match(es) played on 2 June 2026. Source:
2 June 2026
14:00

Rouet-Provence	0–1	Canton Ticino
		Garcia 58'

Verano Stadium, Carate Brianza, Italy
3 June 2026
17:30

Canton Ticino	1–5	Northern Cyprus
Moccetti 88' (pen.)		Şöför 44', 46'; Sezer 48'; Güçlucan 63'; Oshan 87'

Verano Stadium, Carate Brianza, Italy
4 June 2026
17:30

Rouet-Provence	0–4	Northern Cyprus
		Eseller 1'; Güçlucan 42'; Aykut 58'; Oshan 66'

Verano Stadium, Carate Brianza, Italy

=== Placement games ===
==== 3rd Group A vs 3rd Group B match ====
6 June 2026
10:30

Raetia	3–3 (a.e.t.)	Rouet-Provence
Schleich 63', 71', 81' (pen.)		Schmitz 15' (o.g.); Simonis 51', 77'
Penalties
Fahmy (penalty missed); Santini (penalty scored); Schmitz (penalty scored); Hägel (penalty missed)	2–4	Rodriguez (penalty scored); Olive (penalty scored); Tsalikian (penalty scored); Didier (penalty scored)

Verano Stadium, Carate Brianza, Italy

==== Third-place match ====
6 June 2026
14:00

Greenland	3–2	Canton Ticino
Gundel-Collin 9'; Jensen 51'; Ejler 80'		Bejeranu 22'; Heimidach 61'

Carate Stadium, Carate Brianza, Italy

==== Final ====
6 June 2026
18:30

Padania	1–6	Northern Cyprus
Alvitrez 28'		Şöför 31'; Öztümer 32', 40', 49', 54'; Çalban 90'

Carate Stadium, Carate Brianza, Italy

Winners

Northern Cyprus
1st title

== Final positions ==
Pos	Team	Pld	W	D	L	GF	GA	GD
1	Northern Cyprus	3	3	0	0	15	2	+13
2	Padania	3	2	0	1	8	8	0
3	Greenland	3	2	0	1	8	6	+2
4	Canton Ticino	3	1	0	2	4	8	−4
5	Rouet-Provence	3	0	1	2	3	8	−5
6	Raetia	3	0	1	2	5	11	−6

== Goalscorers ==
4 goals

- (Northern Cyprus) Erhun Oztumer

3 goals

- (Northern Cyprus) Şenol Şöför
- (Raetia) Julian Schleich

2 goals

- (Greenland) Adam Ejler
- (Greenland) Angutivik Gundel-Collin
- (Northern Cyprus) Mert Güçlucan
- (Northern Cyprus) Kenan Oshan
- (Padania) Leonardo Pozzoni
- (Padania) Nicolo Colombo
- Jerome Simonis

1 goal

- Nelu Bejeranu
- Rayan Heimidach
- Miguel Garcia
- Anthony Moccetti
- (Greenland) Rene Eriksen Petersen
- (Greenland) Malik Jensen
- (Greenland) Niklas Johansen
- (Greenland) Bastian Rosing
- (Northern Cyprus) Olcay Mahmut Aykut
- (Northern Cyprus) Ada Osman Eseller
- (Northern Cyprus) Mert Sezer
- (Northern Cyprus) Batuhan Calban
- (Padania) Cristian Alvitrez
- (Padania) Riccardo Ravasi
- (Padania) Mirko Montalbano
- (Raetia) Amir Agaei
- (Raetia) Silvan Roffler
