= Padania national football team =

Unofficial national football team representing the region of Padania

- Association: Padania Football Association A.S.D.
- Confederation: CONIFA
- Head coach: (Italy) Arturo Merlo
- Most caps: Andrea Rota (24)
- Top scorer: Matteo Prandelli (14)
First colours	Second colours

First international
- (Italy) Ausonia 2–0 Padania (Benevento, 1 March 1998)

Biggest win
- Padania 20–0 Darfur (Östersund; 1 June 2014)

Biggest defeat
- Northern Cyprus 6–1 Padania (Milan, 6 June 2026)

VIVA World Cup
- Appearances: 3 (first in 2008)
- Best result: Champions 2008, 2009, 2010
- Website: www.padaniasports.it

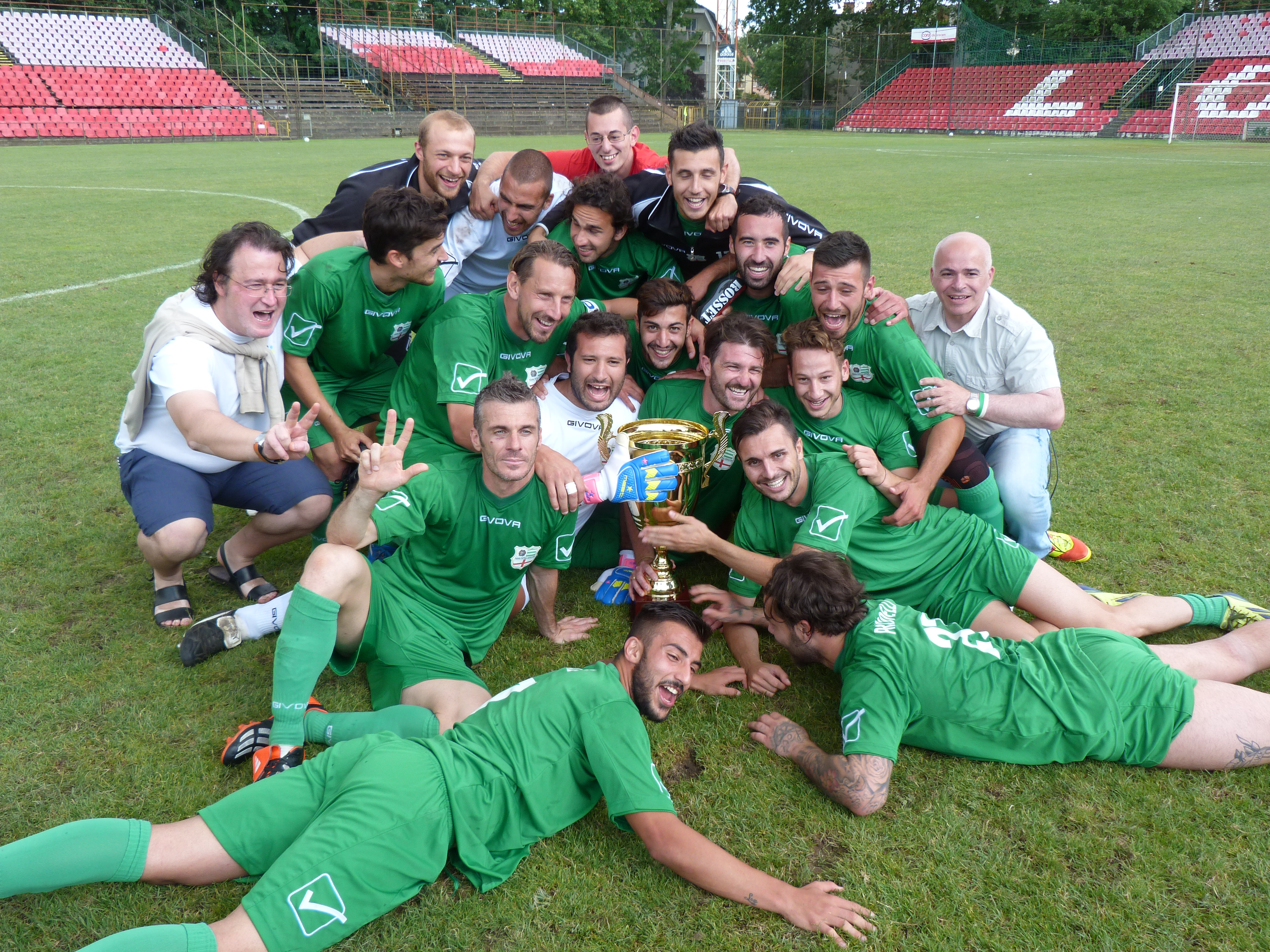
Padania – County of Nice – Debrecen, 21 June 2015.

The Padania representative football team is an unofficial football team that represents Padania, a geographical region composed by the eight regions of Northern Italy. The team is not a member of UEFA, nor is it affiliated with the Italian Football Federation. They have established the Lega Federale Calcio Padania.

Padania had gained provisional membership of the NF-Board in 2008 and was able to take part in the 2008 VIVA World Cup along with Arameans Suryoye, Iraqi Kurdistan, Provence and Sápmi, which they won beating the Arameans Suryoye football team in the final by 2–0. Padania retained their crown when they hosted the 2009 finals, beating Kurdistan in the final. They defeated the Kurds again in 2010 to lift their third VIVA World Cup. Their non-appearance at the 2012 finals meant they did not make it to four consecutive titles. The team is currently a member of ConIFA.

== Tournament records ==
=== World Cup record ===
Year	Position	GP	W	D	L	GF	GA
VIVA World Cup
(Occitania) 2006	did not enter						
(Sápmi) 2008	Champion	5	5	0	0	16	3
(Padania) 2009	Champion	4	4	0	0	9	1
(Gozo) 2010	Champion	4	4	0	0	6	1
(Kurdistan Region) 2012	did not enter						
ConIFA World Football Cup
(Sápmi) 2014	Quarter-Finals	4	2	1	1	25	4
(Abkhazia) 2016	Fourth place	5	1	1	3	9	7
(Ogaden) 2018	Third place	6	4	1	1	21	5
(North Macedonia) 2020	did not enter						
(Kurdistan Region) 2024	withdraw						
Total	3 titles	28	20	3	5	86	21

=== European Cup record ===
Year	Position	GP	W	D	L	GF	GA
ConIFA European Football Cup
(Hungary) 2015	Champion	4	4	0	0	13	3
(Northern Cyprus) 2017	Champion	5	4	1	0	5	2
(Republic of Artsakh) 2019	Quarterfinals	5	2	1	2	10	5
(County of Nice) 2021	Group Stage	3	1	1	1	6	3
(Northern Cyprus) 2023	N/A						
Total	2 titles	14	10	2	2	28	10

== Selected internationals ==
Date	Venue		Opponent	Score
4 June 2022	2022 CONIFA European Football Cup – Nice	Padania	Kárpátalja	
3 June 2022	2022 CONIFA European Football Cup – Nice	Padania	Western Armenia	
5 June 2010	2010 VIVA World Cup – Gozo	Padania	Kurdistan Region	1–0
4 June 2010	2010 VIVA World Cup – Gozo	Padania	Two Sicilies	2–0
1 June 2010	2010 VIVA World Cup – Gozo	Padania	Occitania	1–0
31 May 2010	2010 VIVA World Cup – Gozo	Gozo	Padania	1–2
11 March 2010	Rodengo Saiano	Padania	Provence	1–3
27 June 2009	2009 VIVA World Cup – Padania	Padania	Kurdistan Region	2–0
25 June 2009	2009 VIVA World Cup – Padania	Padania	Sápmi	4–0
24 June 2009	2009 VIVA World Cup – Padania	Padania	Kurdistan Region	2–1
22 June 2009	2009 VIVA World Cup – Padania	Padania	Occitania	1–0
30 April 2009	Darfo Boario Terme, Brescia	Padania	Two Sicilies	0–0 (3–1 pk)
13 July 2008		Padania	Arameans Suryoye	2–0
12 July 2008	2008 VIVA World Cup – Sápmi	Padania	Arameans Suryoye	4–1
11 July 2008	2008 VIVA World Cup – Sápmi	Sápmi	Padania	0–2
9 July 2008	2008 VIVA World Cup – Sápmi	Padania	Kurdistan Region	2–1
10 July 2008	2008 VIVA World Cup – Sápmi	Padania	Provence	6–1
4 July 1999	St. Pierre (Aosta Valley)	Arpitania	Padania	2–1
5 April 1999	Corte Franca	Franciacorta	Padania	3–3 (7–8 pk)
18 July 1998	Bassano del Grappa	Padania	South Tyrol	12–0
7 June 1998	Marnaz (Savoy)	Savoy	Padania	3–3 (8–7 pk)
24 May 1998	Alassio	Padania	(Provence-Alpes-Côte d'Azur) Còsta Azzura/Côte d'Azur	4–1
13 April 1998	Broni	Oltrepò	Padania	1–0
22 March 1998	Stadio F. Ossola (Varese)	Padania	Ausonia	3–0
1 March 1998	Benevento	Ausonia	Padania	2–0

== Current squad ==
The following 23 players were called up for the 2026 CONIFA European Football Cup, to be played in Verano Brianza, Italy from 2 to 6 June 2026.

No.	Pos.	Player	Date of birth (age)	Caps	Goals	Club
	GK	Edoardo Ciancio	April 15, 2003 (age 23)			(Italian Football Federation) Kings League Italy (7-a-side)
	GK	Alessandro Pessagno	March 7, 2008 (age 18)			(Italian Football Federation) Rovato Vertovese
	DF	Giorgio Belotti	November 26, 1998 (age 27)			(Italian Football Federation) Caravaggio
	DF	Nicolò Pavan	September 11, 1993 (age 33)			(Italian Football Federation) Biellese
	DF	Francesco Del Carro	March 25, 1993 (age 33)			(Italian Football Federation) Trevigliese
	DF	Riccardo Ippolito	August 30, 2001 (age 25)			(Italian Football Federation) Lesmo
	DF	Emanuele Ghezzi	November 3, 2005 (age 20)			(Italian Football Federation) Pavonese
	DF	Tommaso Mutti	March 17, 2008 (age 18)			(Italian Football Federation) Rovato Vertovese U19
	DF	Cristian Bettoni	January 18, 2005 (age 21)			(Italian Football Federation) Zingonia Verdellino
	DF	Ryad Zaid				
	MF	Daniele Pozzoni	February 2, 1998 (age 28)			(Italian Football Federation) Caravaggio
	MF	Davide D’Elia	October 7, 2002 (age 24)			(Italian Football Federation) Olimpic Trezzanese
	MF	Alessandro Gandolfo	November 22, 2007 (age 18)			(Italian Football Federation) Lemine Almenno
	MF	Luca Gestra	February 4, 1988 (age 38)			(Italian Football Federation) Gandinese
	MF	Christian Alvitrez	March 5, 1992 (age 34)			(Italian Football Federation) Ivrea
	MF	Federico Vada	September 17, 1991 (age 35)			(Italian Football Federation) Top Serramenti (5-a-side)
	MF	Stefano Pozzaglio	May 2, 2007 (age 19)			(Italian Football Federation) Ospitaletto U19
	FW	Mirko Montalbano	September 28, 1995 (age 31)			(Italian Football Federation) Trevigliese
	FW	Niccolò Colombo	December 13, 1990 (age 35)			(Italian Football Federation) Caronnese
	FW	Leonardo Pozzoni	February 16, 2002 (age 24)			(Italian Football Federation) Zingonia Verdellino
	FW	Marco Ghirardelli	October 23, 2008 (age 18)			(Italian Football Federation) Varesina U19
	FW	Stanislav Bagirov	April 22, 1998 (age 28)			(Italian Football Federation) Siziano Lanterna
	FW	Riccardo Ravasi	December 9, 1994 (age 31)			(Italian Football Federation) Villa Valle

== Important personalities ==
=== Managers ===
Manager	Period	Played	Won	Drawn	Lost	Win %
(Italy) Leopold Siegel	1998–2000	10	3	4	3	30.0
(Italy) Renzo Bossi	2007–2012	19	17	2	0	89.5
(Italy) John Motta	2014	5	2	2	1	40.0
(Italy) Arturo Merlo	2015–present	27	15	6	6	55.6
Totals		61	37	14	10	60.65

=== Presidents of the Padania FA ===
Name	Périod
(Italy) Marco Camerotto	1998–2000
Vacant position from 2000 to 2007
(Italy) Renzo Bossi	2007–2012
(Italy) Ivan Orsi	2013–2015
(Italy) Fabio Cerini	2015–2024
(Italy) Alberto Rischio	2024–20..

== Honours ==
=== Non-FIFA competitions ===
- Viva World Cup
  - Champions (3): 2008, 2009, 2010
- CONIFA World Football Cup
  - Third place (1): 2018
- CONIFA European Football Cup
  - Champions (2): 2015, 2017
