= Magni Jarnskor =

Faroese footballer

Personal information
- Date of birth: 16 November 1968 (age 57)
- Position: Midfielder

Senior career*
Years	Team	Apps	(Gls)
1989–2002	GÍ Gøta		

International career
1989–1998	Faroe Islands	27	(0)
- * Club domestic league appearances and goals

Magni Jarnskor (born 16 November 1968) is a Faroese retired football midfielder.
