= 2024 CONIFA World Football Cup =

Tournament details
- Host country: Kurdistan
- Dates: Cancelled

Tournament statistics

The 2024 CONIFA World Football Cup would have been the fourth edition of the CONIFA World Football Cup, an international football tournament for states, minorities, stateless peoples and regions unaffiliated with FIFA organised by CONIFA. On 9 May 2023, Kurdistan Region was announced as the tournament host, but was removed in September 2024 following their suspension by CONIFA.

On 30 April 2024, CONIFA announced that the tournament would be postponed until summer 2025 after security concerns meant that a large number of teams would not travel to the region. On 9 September 2024, it was announced that Kurdistan would no longer host the tournament and had been suspended. Statement by the CONIFA president shared through social media suggested that Brazilian state of São Paulo was to become the new host.

On 18 December 2024, CONIFA announced that the rescheduled 2025 tournament would be cancelled, after potential host São Paulo failed to show proof of organisational or financial ability. CONIFA announced that the next World Football Cup would be held in either 2026 or 2027.

== Host selection ==
In April 2023, following a visit to the region a month earlier announced that the Kurdistan Region would host the 2024 CONIFA World Football Cup, the first since the 2018 CONIFA World Football Cup due to the COVID-19 pandemic resulting in the cancellation of the 2020 CONIFA World Football Cup due to be held in Skopje, North Macedonia. Following the suspension of Kurdistan Football Association by CONIFA, the former lost its hosting rights. Therefore, the 2024 CONIFA World Cup was cancelled.

== Qualification ==
CONIFA assigns the number of berths for each continent according to the percentage of CONIFA members that come from that continent, with each continent having guaranteed at least one spot in the tournament. In addition, one place is reserved to the host team, other to the current champion (Kárpátalja) and one wild card. Hawaiʻi shared, via social media, that while they had been given an automatic ticket to the tournament, as Oceania's only member, they had declined the invitation and transferred their ticket to Asia, although no formal confirmation had been made by CONIFA.

Continent	Active members	Percentage	Proposed Spots	Actual Spots
Africa	1	10%	1	1
Asia	6	17%	2	5
Europe	16	50%	6	8
North America	3	7%	1	1
Oceania	1	3%	1	0
South America	2	13%	2	2

=== Qualified teams ===
Team	Region	Method of qualification	Date of qualification	Finals appearance	Previous appearance	Previous best performance
Kárpátalja	Europe	2018 Champion	9 June 2018	2nd	2018	Champion (2018)
Kurdistan Region	Asia	Host team	9 May 2023	3rd	2014, 2016	Quarterfinalist (2014, 2016)
Raetia	Europe	European Group B Winner	17 June 2023	2nd	2016	Group stage (2016)
Székely Land	Europe	European Group C Winner	2 July 2023	3rd	2016, 2018	Fourth (2018)
Cornwall	Europe	European Group A Winner	16 July 2023	1st	—N/a	—N/a
Tamil Eelam	Asia	Asia Football Cup Winner	8 August 2023	3rd	2016, 2018	Group Stage (2016)
Tibet	Asia	Asia Football Cup Third Place	8 August 2023	2nd	2018	Group Stage (2018)
ANBM	North America	Selected	18 August 2023	1st	—N/a	—N/a
Kabylie	Africa	Selected	14 September 2023	2nd	2018	Group Stage (2018)
Abkhazia	Europe	Selected	14 September 2023	4th	2014, 2016, 2018	Champion (2016)
Panjab	Asia	Selected	7 November 2023	2nd	2016, 2018	Runners-up (2016)
Kashmir	Asia	Selected	7 November 2023	1st	—N/a	—N/a
Two Sicilies	Europe	Selected	7 November 2023	1st	—N/a	—N/a
South Ossetia	Europe	Selected	7 November 2023	2nd	2014	Fourth (2014)
Canton Ticino	Europe	Selected	7 November 2023	1st	—N/a	—N/a
São Paulo	South America	Selected	28 February 2024	1st	—N/a	—N/a
Maule Sur	South America	Selected	20 March 2024	1st	—N/a	—N/a
