= Raetia national football team =

Unofficial national football team representing the region of Raetia

Raetia
- Nickname: The Grisons
- Association: Raetia Football Association (Fussballauswahl Raetia)
- Confederation: ConIFA
- Head coach: Simone Fontana
- Captain: Mirco Oswald
- Most caps: Kastrie (3)
- Top scorer: Kastrie (10)
First colours	Second colours

First international
- Chagos Islands 6–1 Raetia (Crawley, England; 4 December 2011)

Biggest win
- Ticino 1–8 Raetia (Tenero-Contra, Switzerland; 17 June 2023)

Biggest defeat
- Gozo 17–1 Raetia (Xewkija, Malta; 14 January 2012)

CONIFA World Football Cup
- Appearances: 1 (first in 2016)
- Best result: 11th place (2016)

VIVA World Cup
- Appearances: 1 (first in 2012)
- Best result: 8th place (2012)

The Raetia national football team (German: Fussballauswahl Raetia) represents Grisons, formerly known as R(h)aetia, (/ˈriːʃ(i)ə/ REE-sh(ee-)ə) in ConIFA association football. The current head coach is Simone Fontana. The team is commonly referred to as The Grisons.

== History ==
Silvan Tomaschett, Alan Egli, Cafer Yildirim, Ugur Sihyürek, Simone Fontana, and Manuel Rodriguez, Kastrie, Mirco Oswald, Bulloni as part of Raetia's golden generation.

Raetia's first game was played in December 2011 against the Chagos Islands national football team. The second game took place in January 2012 on the island of Gozo against Gozo.

The first home game was on 26 May 2012 against the fifth Team of FC St. Pauli in Domat/Ems and Raetia won 6–0.

Raetia was qualified to play the 2012 VIVA World Cup in the northern Iraqi region of Kurdistan. In the group matches they gained a victory against Tamil Eelam and a loss to Zanzibar the 2nd rank and missed the semi-finals only because of goal difference.

On 6 September 2015 Raetia beat Franconia 6–0 and qualified for the 2016 ConIFA World Football Cup in Abkhazia.

In 2023, Raetia entered the 2024 CONIFA World Cup Qualifiers, where they beat Ticino 8-1, thus qualifying them for the competition. A few months later, they participated in their second Benedikt Fontana Cup, where they beat Ticino again, 5-1.

== Players and managers ==
=== Current squad ===
The following 23 players were called up for the 2026 CONIFA European Football Cup, to be played in Verano Brianza, Italy from 2 to 6 June 2026.

No.	Pos.	Player	Date of birth (age)	Caps	Goals	Club
	GK	Gabriel Hägel				(German Football Association) SV Hundszell
	GK	Matthias Priebs				(Swiss Football Association) Team Imboden
	GK	Fadri Dennier				
	DF	Raphael Urben				(Swiss Football Association) Team Witikon-Neumünster
	DF	Paolo Spinelli				(Swiss Football Association) Raggruppamento Castello-Coldrerio
	DF	Philipp Schmitz				
	DF	Serkan Karamese (captain)	1 May 1987 (age 39)			(Swiss Football Association) Erlinsbach
	DF	Christian Nüssli				
	DF	Ugur Sihyürek	8 September 1989 (age 36)			
	DF	Philipp Brasser				(Swiss Football Association) Landquart
	MF	Sebastian Doden				
	MF	Silvan Roffler				(Swiss Football Association) Landquart
	MF	Yahia Fahmy				
	MF	Teke Oruç	30 July 1997 (age 29)			(Swiss Football Association) Lenzburg
	MF	Christian Perren				
	MF	Mauro Furger				(Swiss Football Association) Bonaduz Reserves
	MF	Ruben Bernegger				
	MF	Michel Santini	1989			
	FW	Julian Schleich	8 March 1996 (age 30)			(German Football Association) TSV Langenau
	FW	Danijel Milićević	5 January 1986 (age 40)			Retired
	FW	Amir Agaei				(Swiss Football Association) Ems Reserves
	FW	Jakob Engelberger				
	FW	Luca Good				

=== Notable players ===
- (Raetia) Mirco Oswald - captain
- (Raetia) Luca Good - Second captain
- (Raetia) Franco Conzett - MVP
- (Raetia) Paolo Bottoni - MVP
- (Raetia) Andrea Rüttimann - MVP
- (Raetia) Erion Kuqi - MVP
- (Raetia) Corsin Schumacher - kein MVP
- (Raetia) Silvan Roffler - MVP

=== Managers ===
Name	Nationality	Year
Rudolf Schmid	(Switzerland)	2011
Gian-Marco Schmid	(Switzerland)	2011–2012
Ursin Caviezel	(Switzerland)	2012
Costantino Demenga	(Switzerland)	2012–2014
Arsim Ramizi	(Switzerland) (Kosovo)	2014–2015
Alen Bratelj	(Switzerland) (Croatia)	2015–2016
Pascal Amrein	(Switzerland)	2016–2017
Aziz Agirman	(Switzerland)	2017–2020
Simone Fontana	(Switzerland)	2020–present

=== Presidents ===
Name	Nationality	Year
Gubert Luck a.k.a. Gubi	(Switzerland)	2020-present

== Competitive record ==
=== VIVA World Cup ===
VIVA World Cup Record
Year	Round	Position	GP	W	D	L	GS	GA
(Occitania) 2006	did not qualify							
(Sápmi) 2008	did not qualify							
(Padania) 2009	did not qualify							
(Gozo) 2010	did not qualify							
(Kurdistan Region) 2012	Round of 8	8th	4	1	0	3	1	13

=== ConIFA World Football Cup ===
ConIFA World Football Cup Record
Year	Round	Position	GP	W	D	L	GS	GA
(Sápmi) 2014	did not qualify							
(Abkhazia) 2016	Round of 12	11th	4	0	1	3	3	23
(Barawa) 2018	did not qualify							
(Kurdistan Region) 2024	Qualified							

=== EUROPEADA European Championship ===
In 2008, 2010 and 2012 the Raetian national team was not at the tournament but a selection of the Rhaeto-Romance speaking part of the canton of Grisons.

=== Benedikt Fontana Cup ===
Benedikt Fontana Cup record
Year	Round	Position	Pld	W	L	GF	GA
(Raetia) 2015	Champions	1st	1	1	0	3	0
(Raetia) 2023	Champions	1st	1	1	0	5	1

== Schedule ==
=== All time results and upcoming fixtures ===
Date	Place	Home	Guest	Score
3 January 2026	France, Sausset-les-Pins	Rouet-Provence	Raetia	5–0
26 January 2025	Morocco, Casablanca	Avadas Club Casablanca	Raetia	5–2
17 March 2024	Switzerland, Chur	Raetia	Tibet Schweiz	11–1
6 August 2023	Switzerland, Domat/Ems	Raetia	Canton Ticino	5–1
17 June 2023	Switzerland, Tenero-Contra	Canton Ticino	Raetia	1–8
4 Februar 2023	Switzerland, Zürich	Raetia	Tibet Schweiz	2–5
13 November 2022	Netherlands, The Hague	West Papua	Raetia	1–1
7 August 2022	Switzerland, Chur	Raetia	Tibet Schweiz	3–3
16 July 2022	Italy, Capoliveri	Elba Island	Raetia	5–0
25 June 2019	Switzerland, Chur	Raetia	Franconia	3-4 (a.e.t.)
23 March 2019	Italy, Rome	Vatican City	Raetia	2–2
12 March 2017	Switzerland, Trubbach	Raetia	Tamil Eelam	0–5
3 June 2016	Abkhazia, Gagra	Chagos Islands	Raetia	3-3 (penalties 2-4)
2 June 2016	Abkhazia, Gagra	Székely Land	Raetia	7–0
31 May 2016	Abkhazia, Gagra	Northern Cyprus	Raetia	7–0
30 May 2016	Abkhazia, Gagra	Raetia	Padania	0–6
6 September 2015	Switzerland, Chur	Raetia	Franconia	6–0
8 November 2014	Romania, Sepsiszentgyörgy	Székely Land	Raetia	3–0
9 August 2014	Switzerland, Chur	Raetia	Sealand	1–6
29 May 2014	Germany, Lohr am Main	Franconia	Raetia	4–2
7 July 2013	Isle of Man, St John's	Tamil Eelam	Raetia	5–0
6 July 2013	Isle of Man, St John's	Raetia	Alderney	3–2
29 June 2013	France, La Chaux	Saugeais	Raetia	1–1
10 June 2012	France, Beausoleil	Monaco	Raetia	1–2
9 June 2012	Iraq, Arbil	Tamil Eelam	Raetia	4–0
8 June 2012	Iraq, Arbil	Western Sahara	Raetia	3–0
5 June 2012	Iraq, Arbil	Tamil Eelam	Raetia	0–1
4 June 2012	Iraq, Arbil	Zanzibar	Raetia	6–0
14 January 2012	Malta, Xewkija	Gozo	Raetia	17–1
4 December 2011	United Kingdom, Crawley	Chagos Islands	Raetia	6–1

== Home stadium ==
Raetia does not have a national stadium as such, though major matches are usually played in Chur, Ems or Trin. Other large grounds which could be used include Vaduz and Bellinzona.

== Colours ==
Raetia's traditional kit is a white jersey with black, accompanied by black shorts and socks while their current away kit is a royal blue shirt. As a reference to the 60th jubilee of Queen Elizabeth, Raetia has worn the blue shirts on 9 June 2012 against Tamil Eelam.

The colours blue-white-grey/black are the national colours of Raetia.

== Raetias's historical kits ==
Collections of kits used by The Grisons

Home 2011	Away 2011	Home 2012	Away 2012–	Home 2012–2014	Home 2014–

== Honours ==
By Team

- Benedikt Fontana Cup
  - (gold) Champions (3): 2015, 2017, 2023
  - (silver) Finalist (2): 2019, 2025
- Tynwald Hill International Football Tournament
  - 4th: 2013

Individual awards By Players For Raetia

- Kastrie - (gold) Golden boot (1): 2016
- Bulloni - (silver) Silver boot (1): 2024

== Songs for competitions ==
Rapper Gimma made an unreleased song to encourage the national football team for the 2012 VIVA World Cup:

Series	Anthem / Song	Performer(s)	Writer(s) / Producer(s)
2012 VIVA World Cup	"FA RAETIA"	Gimma	Gimma
