= Northern Cyprus national football team =

Men's association football team

Northern Cyprus
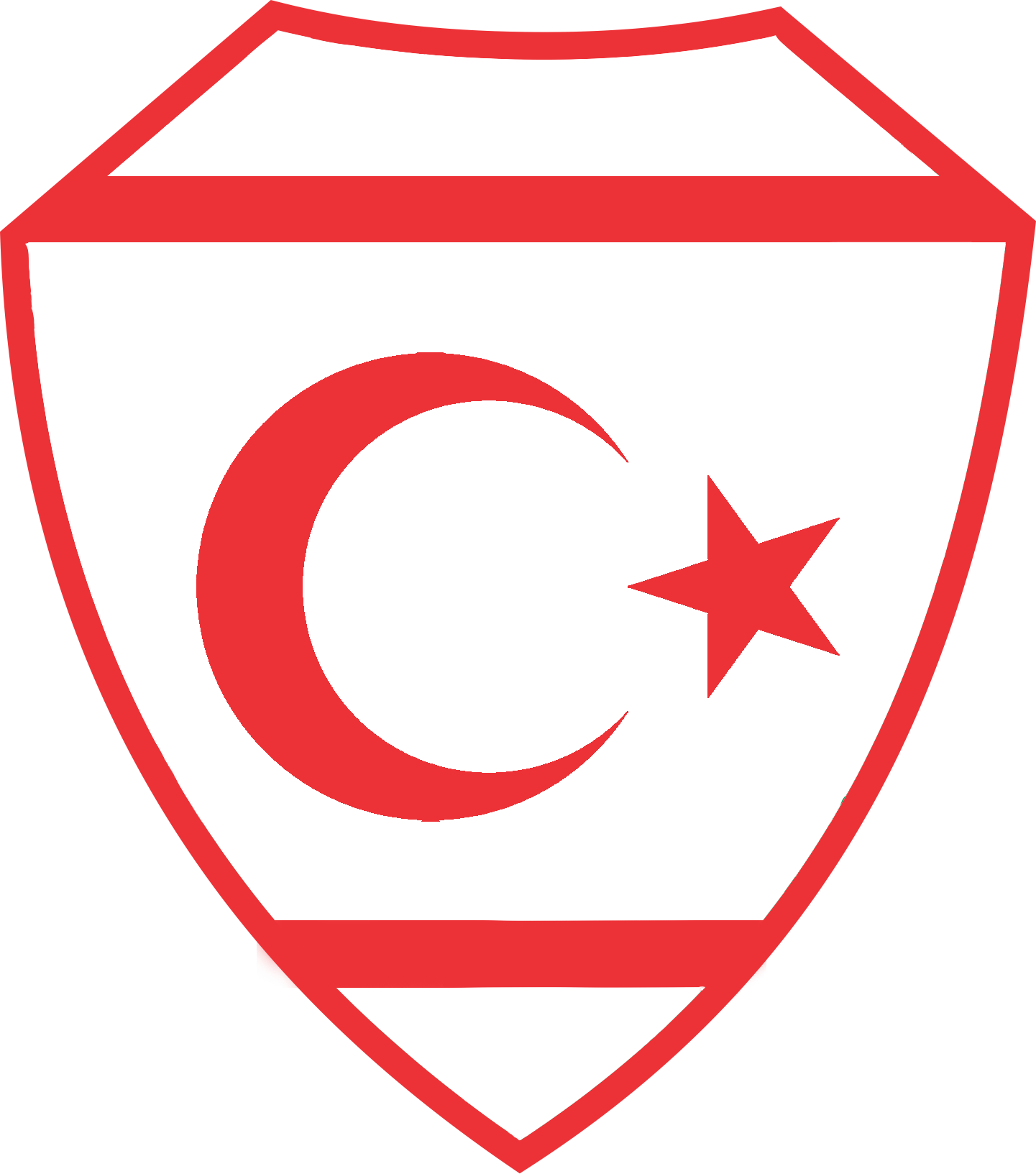
- Association: Cyprus Turkish Football Association (CTFA)
- Confederation: [none]
- Head coach: Caner Oshan
- Most caps: Serkan Önet (25)
- Top scorer: Halil Turan (18)
- Home stadium: Nicosia Atatürk Stadium
- FIFA code: NCY (*Non-FIFA member)
First colours	Second colours

First international
- Turkish Cypriots 0–5 Turkey (1962)

Biggest win
- Northern Cyprus 15-0 Darfur (Arbil, Iraq; 4 June 2016)

Biggest defeat
- Turkish Cypriots 0–5 Turkey (1962); Turkey 5–0 Turkish Cypriots (İzmir, Turkey; 28 September 1980)

CONIFA World Football Cup
- Appearances: 2 (first in 2016)
- Best result: Runners-up (2018)

CONIFA European Football Cup
- Appearances: 2 (first in 2017)
- Best result: Champions (2026)
- Website: ktff.org

The Northern Cyprus national football team (Turkish: Kuzey Kıbrıs Millî Futbol Takımı) represents Northern Cyprus, a de facto country, in association football. They were a member of the New Football Federations-Board for non-FIFA-affiliated nations, until its dissolution in 2013. Northern Cyprus' home stadium is Nicosia Atatürk Stadium in North Nicosia and their head coach is Fırat Canova. They are the current FIFI Wild Cup champions, having won the event in Germany in June 2006. They are also the current ELF Cup champions, having won the event at home in November 2006.

Due to an ongoing sports embargo against Northern Cyprus, the team cannot play international matches with FIFA members.

== History ==
=== Origins (1955–1962) ===
The Cyprus Turkish Football Federation (Turkish: Kıbrıs Türk Futbol Federasyonu, KTFF) was formed as early as 1955 – a consequence of Turkish Cypriot clubs withdrawing from playing in Cypriot sport competitions. Turkish Cypriots first played with a representative national side in 1962, against Turkey. This was before the 1974 war which caused the de facto partition of Cyprus and – as such – participating players were Turkish speakers from all over Cyprus.

=== Islamic Games (1980) ===
Despite not being considered an independent country, Northern Cyprus played in the 1980 Islamic Games football tournament, which was held in İzmir, Turkey. They suffered a 5–0 defeat against Turkey, their worst to date. Other results were a 2–0 loss against Saudi Arabia, 2–1 victory against Malaysia, and a 1–1 tie with Libya.

Reportedly, these matches were tolerated by FIFA as a result of an agreement with then-FIFA General Secretary Helmut Käser. After Northern Cyprus declared itself independent in 1983, this deal came to an end, leaving the Northern Cypriot team unable to play against FIFA-affiliated countries.

=== After the foundation of TRNC (1983–2004) ===
After the foundation of the Turkish Republic of Northern Cyprus in 1983, the KTFF hosted Sport Games Football Federation in 1999, winning the event.

=== NF-Board (2004–2013) ===
KTFF joined the NF-Board in 2004, expanding the horizons of the national team. KTFF hosted the KTFF 50th Anniversary Cup in 2005, winning the event. Turkish Republic of Northern Cyprus won the first NF-Board tournament, the FIFI Wild Cup, in Hamburg, Germany in June 2006 after defeating Zanzibar 4–1 on penalties after a goalless draw. KTFF was set to host the VIVA World Cup during November 2006, however due to issues between the sides the KTFF chose to host its own tournament, the ELF Cup at that time. Turkish Republic of Northern Cyprus opened the tournament against Crimea, winning 5–0, beating their previous 'largest win' record of 6–2 against Sápmi. Soon after the opener, they beat the new record with a 10–0 victory against Tibet.

Turkish Republic of Northern Cyprus defeated Crimea 3–1 in the ELF Cup finals to lift their second NF-Board cup in the same year. On the 9th of January, Northern Cyprus was chosen to participate in the 2016 ConIFA World Football Cup

== Tournament history ==
Turkish Republic of Northern Cyprus have taken part in five international tournaments and won four. KTFF 50th Anniversary Cup, organised to celebrate 50 years of the KTFF, involved national teams from Kosovo and the Sápmi region of northern Scandinavia, and was won by the hosts with maximum points. NF-Board invited Turkish Republic of Northern Cyprus to take part in the first FIFI Wild Cup, held in Hamburg, Germany. This also featured teams from Greenland, Tibet, Gibraltar, Zanzibar, and a team representing "The Republic of St. Pauli", amateur players drawn from the St Pauli district of Hamburg. TRNC defeated Zanzibar on penalties in the final after a goalless draw to lift the trophy. KTFF hosted and won the ELF Cup beating in the final Crimea, in 2006. In 1999 hosted and won the Sport Games Football Association. The only one tournament lost is the 1980 Islamic Games in Turkey, where they lost 2 matches on 4. the team will compete at the 2016 ConIFA World Football Cup

=== FIFI Wild Cup record ===
Year	Round	Position	Pld	W	D*	L	GF	GA	Scorers
(Germany) 2006	Champions	1st	4	3	1	0	6	1	Oraloğlu (2 goals), Kolcu (1 goal), Çerkez (1 goal), Dylan (o.g.), Morris (o.g.)
Total	1/1	1st	4	3	1	0	6	1	Top scorer: Oraloğlu (2 goals)

- Draws include knockout matches decided on penalty kicks.

=== ELF Cup record ===
Year	Round	Position	Pld	W	D*	L	GF	GA	Scorers
(Northern Cyprus) 2006	Champions	1st	5	5	0	0	28	2	Taşkıran (6 goals), Çakır (5 goals), Uçaner (3 goals), Çukurovalı (3 goals), Kolcu (2 goals), Selden (2 goals), Ulusoy (2 goals), Arıkbuka (1 goal), Kansu (1 goal), Keleşzade (1 goal), Sapsızoğlu (1 goal), Rizvan Abıltarov (o.g.)
Total	1/1	1st	5	5	0	0	28	2	Top scorer: Ertaç Taşkıran (6 goals)

== Competitions record ==
=== Islamic Games ===
Year	Position	GP	W	D	L	GS	GA
Tournament İzmir
1980	4th	4	1	0	3	3	9
Total	Best: 4th	4	1	0	3	3	9

=== Northern Cyprus tournament ===
Year	Position	GP	W	D	L	GS	GA
KTFF 50th Anniversary Cup
2005	1st	2	2	0	0	7	2
ELF Cup
2006	1st	5	5	0	0	28	2
Total	Best: 1st	7	7	0	0	35	4

=== World Cup record ===
Year	Position	GP	W	D	L	GS	GA
FIFI Wild Cup
FC St. Pauli 2006	1st	4	3	1	0	6	1
VIVA World Cup
(Occitania) 2006	did not enter						
(Sápmi) 2008	did not enter						
(Padania) 2009	did not enter						
(Gozo) 2010	did not enter						
(Kurdistan Region) 2012	2nd	4	2	0	2	19	4
ConIFA World Football Cup
(Sápmi) 2014	did not enter						
(Abkhazia) 2016	3rd	5	3	1	1	12	4
(Ogaden) 2018	2nd	6	3	3	0	17	6
(North Macedonia) 2020	did not enter						
Total	Best: 1st	19	14	5	3	54	15

=== European Cup record ===
Year	Position	GP	W	D	L	GS	GA
ConIFA European Football Cup
(Székely Land) 2015	did not enter						
(Northern Cyprus) 2017	2nd	5	3	1	1	14	5
(Republic of Artsakh) 2019	did not enter						
(County of Nice) 2021	cancelled						
(Northern Cyprus) 2023	cancelled						
(Padania) 2026	1st	3	3	0	0	15	2
Total		8	6	1	1	29	7

== Players ==
=== Current squad ===
The following 23 players were called up for the 2026 CONIFA European Football Cup, to be played in Verano Brianza, Italy from 2 to 6 June 2026.

No.	Pos.	Player	Date of birth (age)	Caps	Goals	Club
	GK	Dursun Cem Ateş	29 October 1998 (age 28)			(Cyprus Turkish Football Association) Doğan Türk Birliği
	GK	İrfan Özbay	27 February 1988 (age 38)			(Cyprus Turkish Football Association) Lefke
	GK	Kemal Bağbal	3 September 1994 (age 32)			(Cyprus Turkish Football Association) Gençlik Gücü
	DF	Abdullah Çomunoğlu	5 March 2004 (age 22)			(Cyprus Turkish Football Association) Alsancak Yeşilova
	DF	Batuhan Calban	9 September 1999 (age 27)		1	(Cyprus Turkish Football Association) Çetinkaya
	DF	Emre Kuvvetlişahin	31 March 1999 (age 27)			(Cyprus Turkish Football Association) Mağusa Türk Gücü
	DF	Olcay Mahmut Aykut	11 June 1999 (age 27)		1	(Cyprus Turkish Football Association) Dumlupınar
	DF	Sena Develioğlu	21 September 1999 (age 27)			(Cyprus Turkish Football Association) Küçük Kaymaklı
	DF	Ünal Kaya	6 June 2000 (age 26)	8	1	(Turkish Football Federation)
	DF	Zihni Temelci	11 January 1999 (age 27)			(Turkish Football Federation) Mağusa Türk Gücü S.K.
	MF	Ada Osman Esseler	20 November 2003 (age 22)		1	(Turkish Football Federation) Çankaya
	MF	Erhun Aksel Öztümer (captain)	29 May 1991 (age 35)		4	(Cyprus Turkish Football Association) Doğan Türk Birliği
	MF	Mert Sezer	25 February 2005 (age 21)		1	(Cyprus Turkish Football Association) Mağusa Türk Gücü
	MF	Mustafa Sakalli	9 August 1993 (age 33)			(Cyprus Turkish Football Association) Yedidalga
	MF	Mustafa Salk	24 September 1999 (age 27)			(Cyprus Turkish Football Association) Doğan Türk Birliği
	MF	Sercan Demirman	9 July 1990 (age 36)			(Cyprus Turkish Football Association) Cihangir
	FW	Arif Uysal	27 April 1996 (age 30)			(Cyprus Turkish Football Association) Gençlik Gücü
	FW	Hüseyin Arifoğlu	6 February 2007 (age 19)			(Cyprus Turkish Football Association) Yenicami Ağdelen
	FW	Kenan Oshan	27 December 1995 (age 30)	14	5	(Cyprus Turkish Football Association) Doğan Türk Birliği
	FW	Mert Güçlücan	4 March 2002 (age 24)		2	(Cyprus Turkish Football Association) Dumlupınar
	FW	Şenol Şöför	16 November 1994 (age 32)		3	(Cyprus Turkish Football Association) Mağusa Türk Gücü
	FW	Tahsin Özler	28 January 2006 (age 20)			(Turkish Football Federation) Malatya Yeşilyurtspor
	FW	Uğur Naci Gök	22 October 1990 (age 36)	15	5	(Cyprus Turkish Football Association) Cihangir

== Honours ==
=== Non-FIFA competitions ===
- FIFI Wild Cup
  - (gold) Champions (1): 2006
- Viva World Cup
  - (silver) Runners-up (1): 2012
- CONIFA World Football Cup
  - (silver) Runners-up (1): 2018
  - (bronze) Third place (1): 2016
- CONIFA European Football Cup
  - (gold) Champions (1): 2026
  - (silver) Runners-up (1): 2017
- ELF Cup
  - (gold) Champions (1): 2006

== See also ==
- Sport in Northern Cyprus
