= 2018 CONIFA World Football Cup qualification =

Tournament details
- Dates: 6 January 2016 – 10 December 2017
- Teams: 23 (from 1 confederation)

Tournament statistics
- Matches played: 50
- Goals scored: 189 (3.78 per match)
- Top scorer: (Tamil Eelam) Panushanth Kulenthiran (6 goals)

The 2018 CONIFA World Football Cup qualification was the process to decide a number of the teams that will play in the 2018 CONIFA World Football Cup. This is the second tournament to feature a qualification process, following on from the 2016 qualification. The first qualification match played was on 13 March 2016 between the Tamil Eelam team and the team representing the Romani people, with the first goal scored by Tamil Eelam's Panushanth Kulenthiran.

== Background ==
The Confederation of Independent Football Associations (CONIFA) was founded in June 2013, as an organisation to represent football associations that are not eligible or choose not to join FIFA. One year later, it held its first official tournament, the 2014 CONIFA World Football Cup, in Sweden, to which the twelve participating teams were invited. The success of this tournament led to the decision to make it a biannual competition, with continental tournaments taking place in between, the first of which was the 2015 CONIFA European Football Cup.

CONIFA published a set of qualification criteria for the World Football Cup ahead of its 2017 Annual General Meeting, setting out the various methods in which teams could qualify for the WFC. This was subsequently revised into an official version for publication in June 2017.

- Host – Barawa
- World Football Cup Holder – Abkhazia
- Wild Card – CONIFA's Executive Committee were required to give a Wild Card place to a team that has not yet qualified for the WFC no later than 9 months prior to the start of the tournament - this was given to Western Armenia. The Committee also had the right to issue a second Wild Card if approved by CONIFA's Annual General Meeting, which occurred and was given to Tibet.
- Qualification tournament – Any member of CONIFA had the right to request that a tournament it hosts be sanctioned as a qualifier, providing it is held between 1 January of the year of the previous WFC, and 31 December of the year before the next WFC, and consists of at least four CONIFA members. The request to have the tournament sanctioned as a qualifier must be submitted at least two months prior to the start, and must be approved by CONIFA's Executive Committee. Three such tournaments were held, the CONIFA Challenger Cup, the Hungary Heritage Cup and the World Unity Cup 2016.
- Continental tournament – If a CONIFA continental championship is held after the previous WFC, then a number of its participants qualify for the WFC; the total qualifiers is worked out by the number of participants in the tournament divided by 4. Only one such tournament was held, the ConIFA European Football Cup 2017 at which both the winner and runner-up qualified.
- Qualification points – The remaining places (which numbered 8) were distributed according to the final positions in the various CONIFA continental rankings according to their accumulated ranking points, distributed by a system which rewarded playing matches against both CONIFA and other opponents. Where two or more teams from the same continental zone had the same number of qualification points, qualification was to be determined by the CONIFA World Rankings.

CONIFA is split into six continental zones, with the total number of places in the World Football Cup based on the number of CONIFA members from each zone. As of October 2026, the distribution of places for the WFC, dependent on the size of the final tournament, is:

No of finals spots	Europe	Asia	Africa	Oceania	North America	South America
12	5	3	2	1	1	0 (Note: There were no South American members of ConIFA at the time of the tournament)
16	8	3	3	1	1	0

The first qualifying process was undertaken for the 2016 CONIFA World Football Cup, which saw a series of friendly matches and tournaments, together with the 2015 CONIFA European Football Cup, designated as qualifiers for the 2016 WFC. However, this decision was taken at a late stage prior to the start of the European Football Cup tournament, only a year prior to the planned start of the 2016 WFC in Abkhazia. As a consequence, for its 2018 WFC tournament, ConIFA began designating planned friendly matches as qualifiers from the beginning of 2016, allowing a greater time for those teams achieving qualification to plan for the tournament. The first of these was the CONIFA Challenger Cup, held in Remscheid on 12 and 13 March 2016.

== Qualified teams ==
Team	Region	Method of qualification	Date of qualification	Finals appearance	Previous appearance	Previous best performance	Notes
Tamil Eelam	Asia	CONIFA Challenger Cup winners	13 March 2016	2nd	2014	11th place (2014)	
Abkhazia	Europe	CONIFA World Football Cup Winners	6 June 2016	3rd	2016	Winners (2016)	
Felvidék	Europe	Hungary Heritage Cup winners	3 August 2016	1st	N/A	N/A	
Western Armenia	Europe	Wild Card	14 January 2017	2nd	2016	Quarter-Final (2016)	
Barawa	Africa	Host	8 June 2017	1st	N/A	N/A	
Tibet	Asia	Wild Card	8 June 2017	1st	N/A	N/A	
Kiribati	Oceania	Regional qualification	8 June 2017	1st	N/A	N/A	
Cascadia	North America	Regional qualification	8 June 2017	1st	N/A	N/A	
Padania	Europe	CONIFA European Football Cup Winners	10 June 2017	3rd	2016	4th Place (2016)	
Northern Cyprus	Europe	CONIFA European Football Cup Runners Up	10 June 2017	2nd	2016	3rd Place (2016)	
Panjab	Asia	Regional qualification	2 September 2017	2nd	2016	2nd Place (2016)	
(Korea) United Koreans of Japan	Asia	Regional qualification	2 September 2017	2nd	2016	Quarter-Final (2016)	
Matabeleland	Africa	Regional qualification	2 September 2017	1st	N/A	N/A	
Kabylie	Africa	Regional qualification	2 September 2017	1st	N/A	N/A	
(Isle of Man) Ellan Vannin	Europe	Regional qualification	2 September 2017	2nd	2014	2nd Place (2014)	
Székely Land	Europe	Regional qualification	2 September 2017	2nd	2016	Placement Round (2016)	

== Qualification ==
=== CONIFA Challenger Cup ===
The CONIFA Challenger Cup was a two team competition held over two days. The two participants, Tamil Eelam and Romani people, each played a 45-minute match against a local select side from the town of Remscheid, where the tournament was being held, on the first day, before playing off against each other on the second.

13 March 2016 Final	Tamil Eelam	4–1	Romani people	Stadion Reinshagen, Remscheid, Germany
19:45 CET	Kulenthiran 17', 90'; Sivanesamurthy 23'; Navaneethakrishnan 78'	Report	Eyob 82'
Note: Tamil Eelam qualify for WFC; Romani People – 3 qualifying points

=== Hungary Heritage Cup ===
The Hungary Heritage Cup was a four-team competition held at the beginning of August 2016 in Szarvas, celebrating the heritage of various members of the Hungarian diaspora. The four teams featured two current members of ConIFA, together with two other teams, with the winner qualifying for the World Football Cup.

1 August 2016 Semi-final	Felvidék	1–1 (5–4 p)	Kárpátalja	Erzsébet-ligeti Sporttelep, Szarvas, Hungary
17:45 CEST	Renczes 30'	Report	? 42'
Note: Felvidek – 9 qualifying points; Kárpátalja – 3 qualifying points

1 August 2016 Semi-final	Délvidék	3–1	Székely Land	Erzsébet-ligeti Sporttelep, Szarvas, Hungary
15:00 CEST	Mindlecz 16'; Pozsár 63'; Könyves 77'	Report	Bajkó 78'
Note: Délvidék – 9 qualifying points; Székely Land – 3 qualifying points

3 August 2016 Final	Délvidék	1–2	Felvidék	Erzsébet-ligeti Sporttelep, Szarvas, Hungary
16:45 CEST	Nagy	Report	Érsek; Magyar
Note: Délvidék – 3 qualifying points; Felvidek qualify for WFC

=== World Unity Cup 2016 ===
The World Unity Cup was planned as a four-team tournament held at the end of August 2016 in Sutton. The competition was organised jointly by three ConIFA members representing displaced peoples, with the winner qualifying for the World Football Cup.

- Chagos Islands
- Darfur
- (Isle of Man) Ellan Vannin (not a displaced people)
- Tamil Eelam

Subsequent to the announcement, both Darfur and Ellan Vannin withdrew, and the tournament was reorganized as a three-team event, with the Barawa team replacing them.

25 August 2016 Group stage	Barawa	0–5	Tamil Eelam	Borough Sports Ground, Sutton, England
18:00 BST			Kasthuran 28'; Jan 30'; Navaneethakrishnan 52'; Kulenthiran 75', 84'
Note: Barawa – 3 qualifying points; Tamil Eelam – N/A (already qualified for WFC)

26 August 2016 Group stage	Barawa	2–3	Chagos Islands	Borough Sports Ground, Sutton, England
18:15 BST	Sufi		Bhujan; Robertson; Sooprayen
Note: Chagos Islands – 9 qualifying points; Barawa – 3 qualifying points

27 August 2016 Group stage	Chagos Islands	P–P	Tamil Eelam	Borough Sports Ground, Sutton, England
19:30 BST

28 August 2016 Final	Chagos Islands	1–5	Tamil Eelam	Borough Sports Ground, Sutton, England
18:45 BST	Gaspard 48'		Navaneethakrishnan 4' (pen.); Sivanesamurthy 8', 11'; Kulenthiran 68'; Chandran 70' (pen.)
Note: Chagos Islands – 3 qualifying points; Tamil Eelam – N/A (already qualified for WFC)

=== CONIFA European Football Cup 2017 ===
The 2017 European Football Cup was announced in January 2017 with a total of eight teams due to take part. The winner of the competition was guaranteed a place at the World Football Cup.

Key to colours in group tables
Teams that advanced to the semi-finals

==== Group A ====
Team	Pld	W	D	L	GF	GA	GD	Pts
Northern Cyprus (Q)	3	2	1	0	9	0	+9	7
Abkhazia (Q)	3	1	2	0	4	3	+1	5
Kárpátalja	3	1	1	1	6	4	+2	4
South Ossetia	3	0	0	3	2	14	−12	0

(Q) Qualified for the phase indicated

4 June 2017	Northern Cyprus	1–0	Kárpátalja	Nicosia, N. Cyprus
20:00 EEST	Yasinses			Stadium: Atatürk Stadium

5 June 2017	Abkhazia	2–1	South Ossetia	Kyrenia, N. Cyprus
20:00 EEST	Kortava; Shoniya		Kadjaev	Stadium: Mete Adanır Stadium

6 June 2017	South Ossetia	0–8	Northern Cyprus	Kyrenia, N. Cyprus
20:00 EEST			Yasinses; Taskiran; Çıdamlı; Turan (pen.); Gok	Stadium: Mete Adanır Stadium

6 June 2017	Kárpátalja	2–2	Abkhazia	Nicosia, N. Cyprus
20:00 EEST	Robert; Roman		Semyonov	Stadium: Atatürk Stadium

7 June 2017	South Ossetia	1–4	Kárpátalja	Famagusta, N. Cyprus
20:00 EEST	Kochiev		Mile; Baksa; Tibor	Stadium: Dr. Fazıl Küçük Stadium

7 June 2017	Northern Cyprus	0–0	Abkhazia	Morphou, N. Cyprus
20:00 EEST				Stadium: Üner Berkalp Stadium

==== Group B ====
Team	Pld	W	D	L	GF	GA	GD	Pts
Padania (Q)	3	2	1	0	4	1	+3	7
Székely Land (Q)	3	1	1	1	5	4	+1	4
Ellan Vannin	3	1	0	2	3	5	−2	3
Felvidék	3	1	0	2	1	3	−2	3

(Q) Qualified for the phase indicated

5 June 2017	Padania	1–0	(Isle of Man) Ellan Vannin	Morphou, N. Cyprus
20:00 EEST	Rota			Stadium: Üner Berkalp Stadium

5 June 2017	Felvidék	1–0	Székely Land	Famagusta, N. Cyprus
20:00 EEST	Krizan			Stadium: Dr. Fazıl Küçük Stadium

6 June 2017	Székely Land	1–1	Padania	Famagusta, N. Cyprus
20:00 EEST	Szőcs		? (o.g.)	Stadium: Dr. Fazıl Küçük Stadium

6 June 2017	Ellan Vannin (Isle of Man)	1–0	Felvidék	Morphou, N. Cyprus
20:00 EEST	Bass			Stadium: Üner Berkalp Stadium

7 June 2017	Ellan Vannin (Isle of Man)	2–4	Székely Land	Kyrenia, N. Cyprus
20:00 EEST	McNulty		Bajko	Stadium: Mete Adanır Stadium

7 June 2017	Padania	2–0	Felvidék	Nicosia, N. Cyprus
20:00 EEST	Rota; Rosset			Stadium: Atatürk Stadium

==== Knockout stages ====
9 June 2017 Semi-final 1	Northern Cyprus	2–1	Székely Land	Atatürk Stadium, Nicosia, Northern Cyprus
20:00 EEST	Onet; Turan		Petru

9 June 2017 Semi-final 2	Padania	0–0 (6–5 p)	Abkhazia	Mete Adanır Stadium, Kyrenia, Northern Cyprus
20:00 EEST
	Penalties
	Penalty scored		Penalty scored Penalty missed

10 June 2017 Final	Northern Cyprus	1–1 (2–3 p)	Padania	Atatürk Stadium, Nicosia, Northern Cyprus
20:00 EEST	Turan		Pllumbjai
	Penalties
	Penalty scored Penalty missed		Penalty scored Penalty missed
Note: Padania and Northern Cyprus qualify for WFC

=== Qualification points standing ===
The following is a list of games not part of sanctioned ConIFA tournaments for which teams have accrued qualifying points:^{α}

6 January 2016 Friendly	Olympique de Marseille (CFA)	3–2	Western Armenia	Stade Roger Lebert, Marseille, France
16:00 CET	Goal		Militosyan
Note: Western Armenia – 1 qualifying point

20 February 2016 Friendly	Leicester City FC International Academy	2–2	(Sikh Empire) Panjab	Belvoir Drive, Leicester, England
12:00 BST	Goal		Virk; Minhas
Note: Panjab – 2 qualifying points

20 March 2016 Friendly	Manchester International Football Academy	1–9	(Sikh Empire) Panjab	Salford Sports Village, Salford, England
13:00 BST	Goal		Singh; Singh; Shanker; Purewal; Riaz
Note: Panjab – 3 qualifying points

24 April 2016 International Friendly	Panjab (Sikh Empire)	0–2	Jersey	Aggborough Stadium, Kidderminster, England
15:00 BST			Goal
Note: Panjab – 2 qualifying points

16 May 2016 International Friendly	Romani people	0–2	Padania	Arena Civica, Milan, Italy
21:00 CET			Rota; Rosset
Note: Padania – 9 qualifying points; Romani People – 3 qualifying points

19 May 2016 International Friendly	Abkhazia	0–0	(Donetsk People's Republic) Donetsk PR	Dinamo Stadium, Sukhumi, Abkhazia
20:00 GET
Note: Donetsk PR – 6 qualifying points; Abkhazia – N/A (already qualified for WFC)

19 June 2016 2016 Europeada Group C	Carinthian Slovenes (Carinthia)	0–1	Felvidék	St Johann, Ahrntal, Italy
15:00 CET			Lagos
Note: Felvidék – 6 qualifying points

19 June 2016 2016 Europeada Group D	Occitania	4–1	Aromanians	Sporthalle-Palasport, Sand in Taufers, Italy
15:00 CET	Irigoyemboyde; Natal; Lafuente		Goal
Note: Occitania – 6 qualifying points

19 June 2016 2016 Europeada Group E	South Tyrol	3–0	(Isle of Man) Ellan Vannin	Sommersportzone, Olang, Italy
15:00 CET	Goal
Note: Ellan Vannin – 2 qualifying points

20 June 2016 2016 Europeada Group C	Sorbs	2–2	Felvidék	Waldstadion, Mühlwald, Italy
16:00 CET	Sauer; Domaschke		Meszlenyi; David
Note: Felvidék – 4 qualifying points

20 June 2016 2016 Europeada Group E	Ellan Vannin (Isle of Man)	2–3	North Frisians	Fussballplatz, Niederdorf, Italy
16:00 CET	Davies		Goal
Note: Ellan Vannin – 2 qualifying points

20 June 2016 2016 Europeada Group D	Occitania	4–1	Slovaks in Hungary	St Johann, Ahrntal, Italy
18:30 CET	Bertini; Massare; Irigoyemborde		Goal
Note: Occitania – 6 qualifying points

21 June 2016 2016 Europeada Group C	North Schleswig Germans (Schleswig-Holstein)	0–10	Felvidék	Sporthalle-Palasport, Sand in Taufers, Italy
16:00 CET			Zoli; Meszlenyi; Kalmar; Pragai; Zoller; Jozsef Katona; Meszaros ?
Note: Felvidék – 6 qualifying points

21 June 2016 2016 Europeada Group E	Ellan Vannin (Isle of Man)	2–0	Germans in Upper Silesia	Sommersportzone, Olang, Italy
16:00 CET	Jones; Doyle
Note: Ellan Vannin – 6 qualifying points

21 June 2016 2016 Europeada Group D	Occitania	1–1	Danes in Germany	Waldstadion, Mühlwald, Italy
18:30 CET	Barremaecker		Goal
Note: Occitania – 4 qualifying points

23 June 2016 2016 Europeada QF	Occitania	0–0 (5–3 p)	Felvidék	Sommersportzone, Olang, Italy
18:00 CET
	Penalties
	Penalty scored		Penalty scored Penalty missed
Note: Occitania – 9 qualifying points; Felvidek – 3 qualifying points

23 June 2016 2016 Europeada SF	Occitania	A–A	Croats in Serbia	Ciamp dal sport Pradel, San Martin de Tor, Italy
15:30 CET
Note: Match abandoned after 41 minutes because of unsportmanlike behavior; Occitania awarded 3–0 victory; Occitania – 6 qualifying points

25 June 2016 2016 Europeada Final	South Tyrol	2–1	Occitania	Sporthalle-Palasport, Sand in Taufers, Italy
16:00 CET	Goal		Martinez
Note: Occitania – 2 qualifying points

7 August 2016 Friendly	Barawa	1–5	Cricklewood Wanderers FC	Silver Jubilee Stadium, London, England
14:30 BST	Goal		Goal
Note: Barawa – 1 qualifying point

13 August 2016 International Friendly	Donetsk PR (Donetsk People's Republic)	1–1	(Luhansk People's Republic) Luhansk PR	Metallurg Stadium, Yenakiyevo, Donetsk People's Republic
20:00 EEST	Klyuyev		Titarenko
Note: Donetsk PR – 6 qualifying points; Luhansk PR – 6 qualifying points

28 August 2016 Friendly	Barawa	3–2	(Tamil Eelam) UK Tamil XI	Borough Sports Ground, Sutton, England
16:00 BST	Goal		Goal
Note: Barawa – 3 qualifying points

25 October 2016 Friendly	Östersunds FK Academy	1–6	Darfur	Jämtkraft Arena, Östersund, Sweden
20:00 CEST	Goal		Goal
Note: Darfur – 3 qualifying points

26 November 2016 International Friendly	Ryūkyū	0–9	(Korea) United Koreans of Japan	Gosamaru Field, Nakagusuku, Japan
12:00 JST			Tae; Gomi; Seong-cheol; Awe; Kaijin; Yoshiaki
Note: United Koreans of Japan – 9 qualifying points; Ryūkyū – 3 qualifying points

4 March 2017 Friendly	Leicester City FC International Academy	4–3	(Sikh Empire) Panjab	Belvoir Drive, Leicester, England
13:00 GMT	Goal		Goal
Note: Panjab – 1 qualifying point

12 March 2017 International Friendly	Raetia	0–5	Tamil Eelam	Sportplatz Gufalons, Trübbach, Switzerland
13:00 CET			Kulenthiran; Prashanth; Prabashan ?
Note: Raetia – 3 qualifying points; Tamil Eelam – N/A (already qualified for WFC)

9 April 2017 Friendly	Barawa	4–3	Tokyngton Harvest FC	Coles Park Stadium, London, England
18:45 BST	Goal		Goal
Note: Barawa – 3 qualifying points

23 April 2017 International Friendly	Jersey	0–2	(Sikh Empire) Panjab	Springfield Stadium, Saint Helier, Jersey
12:45 BST			Purewal; Sandhu
Note: Panjab – 6 qualifying points

6 May 2017 Friendly	Peckham Town FC	4–0	Somaliland	Menace Arena, London, England
15:00 BST	Goal
Note: Somaliland – 1 qualifying point

6 May 2017 Friendly	Occitania	2–2	Sélection Quartiers	Stade Borderouge, Toulouse, France
17:00 CET	Goal		Goal
Note: Occitania – 2 qualifying points

27 May 2017 Friendly	Stockport Town FC	0–7	(Isle of Man) Ellan Vannin	Stockport Sports Village, Woodley, England
14:30 BST			Doyle; Whitley; Simpson; Quaye; Cowin ? (o.g.)
Note: Ellan Vannin – 3 qualifying points

28 May 2017 International Friendly	Panjab (Sikh Empire)	1–2	England "C"	Damson Park, Solihull, England
15:00 BST	Virk		Goal
Note: Panjab – 2 qualifying points

3 June 2017 Friendly	Rodez AF	2–2	Occitania	Stade Paul Ligon, Rodez, France
18:00 CET	Goal		Goal
Note: Occitania – 2 qualifying points

17 June 2017 Friendly	Western Sahara	3–3	(United Nations) UN Select XI	Local Field, Tindouf, Algeria
18:00 AST	Boglaida; Mohammed		Goal
Note: Western Sahara – 2 qualifying points

25 June 2017 2017 Island Games Group B	Greenland	3–0	Western Isles	Gutavallen, Visby, Sweden
17:00 CEST	Svane; Zeeb; Bistrup
Note: Greenland – 6 qualifying points

26 June 2017 2017 Island Games Group B	Frøya	2–2	Greenland	Fardhem IP, Hemse, Sweden
17:00 CEST	Goal		Mathæussen; Juhl
Note: Greenland – 4 qualifying points

27 June 2017 2017 Island Games Group B	Gotland	0–1	Greenland	Visborgsvallen, Visby, Sweden
17:00 CEST			Mathæussen
Note: Greenland – 6 qualifying points

29 June 2017 2017 Island Games SF	Greenland	1–1 (3–1 p)	Menorca	Björkome IP, Väskinde, Sweden
13:00 CEST	Juhl		Goal
	Penalties
	Penalty scored Penalty missed		Penalty scored Penalty missed
Note: Greenland – 4 qualifying points

30 June 2017 2017 Island Games Final	Greenland	0–6	Isle of Man	Gutavallen, Visby, Sweden
13:00 CEST			Goal
Note: Greenland – 2 qualification points

10 December 2017 International Friendly	Matabeleland	Cancelled	Darfur	White City Stadium, Bulawayo, Zimbabwe
Note: The game was cancelled due to travel problems.

Key:	Qualification for WFC

Ranking	Europe	Asia	Africa	North America	Oceania	Qualification points	
Ranking	Europe	Asia	Africa	North America	Oceania	Opposition Factor (OF)	Result Factor (RF)
1	Ellan Vannin (52 pts)	United Koreans of Japan (27 pts)	Kabylie (30 pts)	Cascadia (0 pts) Quebec (0 pts)	Kiribati (0 pts) Tuvalu (0 pts)	ConIFA Member = 3	Win = 3
2	Szekely Land (39 pts)	Panjab (18 pts)	Matabeleland (30 pts)			Other international opposition = 2	Draw = 2
3	Kárpátalja (36 pts)	Iraqi Kurdistan (15 pts)	Somaliland (30 pts)			Any other opposition = 1	Loss = 1
4	Occitania (34 pts)	Ryūkyū (3 pts)	Chagos Islands (18 pts)			Points for a single match = OF × RF	
5	Greenland (32 pts)	Arameans Suryoye (0 pts) Uyghurs (0 pts) Lezgians (0 pts) Rohingya (0 pts) Tibet (0 pts)	Darfur (5 pts)			Matches played in WFC do not count towards qualification points totals.; Only the first two matches between teams accrue points.; Additional matches are only considered if played as part of a tournament.; Only the ten matches where a team accrued the most points are considered.; If a member hosts a continental championship during the qualifying period, it receives additional points (number of participants × 3).	
6	Donetsk PR (21 pts)		Western Sahara (2 pts)			Matches played in WFC do not count towards qualification points totals.; Only the first two matches between teams accrue points.; Additional matches are only considered if played as part of a tournament.; Only the ten matches where a team accrued the most points are considered.; If a member hosts a continental championship during the qualifying period, it receives additional points (number of participants × 3).	
7	Delvidek (15 pts)		Zanzibar (0 pts) Barotseland (0 pts)			Matches played in WFC do not count towards qualification points totals.; Only the first two matches between teams accrue points.; Additional matches are only considered if played as part of a tournament.; Only the ten matches where a team accrued the most points are considered.; If a member hosts a continental championship during the qualifying period, it receives additional points (number of participants × 3).	
8	South Ossetia (12 pts)					Matches played in WFC do not count towards qualification points totals.; Only the first two matches between teams accrue points.; Additional matches are only considered if played as part of a tournament.; Only the ten matches where a team accrued the most points are considered.; If a member hosts a continental championship during the qualifying period, it receives additional points (number of participants × 3).	
9	Raetia (9 pts)					Matches played in WFC do not count towards qualification points totals.; Only the first two matches between teams accrue points.; Additional matches are only considered if played as part of a tournament.; Only the ten matches where a team accrued the most points are considered.; If a member hosts a continental championship during the qualifying period, it receives additional points (number of participants × 3).	
10	Luhansk PR (6 pts)					Matches played in WFC do not count towards qualification points totals.; Only the first two matches between teams accrue points.; Additional matches are only considered if played as part of a tournament.; Only the ten matches where a team accrued the most points are considered.; If a member hosts a continental championship during the qualifying period, it receives additional points (number of participants × 3).	
11	Romani people (6 pts)					Matches played in WFC do not count towards qualification points totals.; Only the first two matches between teams accrue points.; Additional matches are only considered if played as part of a tournament.; Only the ten matches where a team accrued the most points are considered.; If a member hosts a continental championship during the qualifying period, it receives additional points (number of participants × 3).	
12	County of Nice (3 pts)					Matches played in WFC do not count towards qualification points totals.; Only the first two matches between teams accrue points.; Additional matches are only considered if played as part of a tournament.; Only the ten matches where a team accrued the most points are considered.; If a member hosts a continental championship during the qualifying period, it receives additional points (number of participants × 3).	
13	Western Armenia (1 pt)					Matches played in WFC do not count towards qualification points totals.; Only the first two matches between teams accrue points.; Additional matches are only considered if played as part of a tournament.; Only the ten matches where a team accrued the most points are considered.; If a member hosts a continental championship during the qualifying period, it receives additional points (number of participants × 3).	
14	Franconia (0 pts) Heligoland (0 pts) Monaco (0 pts) Nagorno-Karabakh (0 pts) Sapmi (0 pts) Skåneland (0 pts) Transnistria (0 pts)					Matches played in WFC do not count towards qualification points totals.; Only the first two matches between teams accrue points.; Additional matches are only considered if played as part of a tournament.; Only the ten matches where a team accrued the most points are considered.; If a member hosts a continental championship during the qualifying period, it receives additional points (number of participants × 3).	

ConIFA World Rankings
1.	Occitania
2.	(Sikh Empire) Panjab
3.	Northern Cyprus
4.	County of Nice
5.	Abkhazia
6.	Kurdistan Region
7.	Greenland
8.	Arameans Suryoye
9.	Padania
10.	(Isle of Man) Ellan Vannin
11.	Artsakh
12.	Quebec
13.	Zanzibar
14.	Sápmi
15.	(Korea) United Koreans of Japan
16.	(Luhansk People's Republic) Luhansk PR
17.	Székely Land
17.	Western Armenia
19.	Tamil Eelam
20.	Monaco
21.	Felvidék
22.	Romani people
23.	Franconia
24.	South Ossetia
25.	Somaliland
26.	Chagos Islands
27.	Raetia
28.	Kiribati
29.	Darfur
30.	Tibet

:1.^α Teams that have already qualified no longer accrue qualification points

=== Wild Card ===
In May 2017, CONIFA announced on its website that five of its members had completed the necessary process to be considered for the WFC Wild Card place by the deadline of 2 May 2017. The wild card spot was decided at the CONIFA Executive Committee meeting, held during the European Football Cup in Northern Cyprus. The five teams under consideration were:

Team	Zone
Darfur	Africa
Western Sahara	Africa
Kiribati	Oceania
Tuvalu	Oceania
Tibet	Asia

At the Executive Committee meeting, held in Northern Cyprus on 8 June 2017, Tibet were awarded the Wild Card place.

== Top goalscorers ==
6 goals

- (Tamil Eelam) Panushanth Kulenthiran

5 goals

- Barna Bajko

4 goals

- (Sikh Empire) Gurjit Singh

3 goals

- (Tamil Eelam) Gvinthan Navaneethakrishnan
- (Tamil Eelam) Sujan Sivanesamurthy
- (Korea) On-Song Tae
- (Isle of Man) Sean Doyle
- Renàto Meszlènyi
- (Northern Cyprus) Ertaç Taşkıran
- (Northern Cyprus) Halil Turan
- (Padania) Andrea Rota

2 goals

- J. Sufi
- (Western Armenia) Vahagn Militosyan
- (Sikh Empire) Terlochan Singh
- (Sikh Empire) Rajpal Virk
- (Occitania) Guillaume Lafuente
- (Occitania) Mathieu Irigoyemboyde
- (Occitania) Mickael Bertini
- (Isle of Man) Furo Davies
- (Isle of Man) Ciaran McNulty
- (Korea) Yuuki Gomi
- David Zoller
- (Abkhazia) Anatoli Semyonov
- (Northern Cyprus) Mustafa Yasinses
- (Northern Cyprus) İbrahim Çıdamlı
- (Zakarpattia Oblast) Krisztián Mile
- (Padania) William Rosset
- (Greenland) Norsaq Lund Mathæussen
- (Western Sahara) Mohamed Boglaida

1 goal

- Grmawi Eyob
- Sandor Mindlecz
- Daniel Pozsár
- Norbert Könyves
- Zoltán Nagy
- László Szőcs
- Silion Petru
- Gabor Renczés
- Ádám Érsek
- Zoltan Magyar
- Kalmar Lajos
- Mèszàros David
- Nemeth Zoli
- Lajos Kalmar
- György Pragai
- Jozsef Katona
- David Meszaros
- Richard Krizan
- (Tamil Eelam) Johnath Chandran
- (Tamil Eelam) Ragvan Prashanth
- (Tamil Eelam) Prabashan
- (Chagos Archipelago) Didier Gaspard
- (Chagos Archipelago) Mervin Bhujan
- (Chagos Archipelago) Hansley Robertson
- (Chagos Archipelago) Diveeyen Sooprayen
- (Sikh Empire) Aaron Minhas
- (Sikh Empire) Karum Shanker
- (Sikh Empire) Amar Purewal
- (Sikh Empire) Rio Riaz
- (Occitania) Quentin Chalut Natal
- (Occitania) Boris Massarè
- (Occitania) Pierre Barremaecker
- (Occitania) Brice Martinez
- (Isle of Man) Frank Jones
- (Isle of Man) Ste Whitley
- (Isle of Man) Dan Simpson
- (Isle of Man) Sean Quaye
- (Isle of Man) Liam Cowin
- (Isle of Man) Chris Bass
- (Korea) Lee Seong-Cheol
- (Korea) Kang Awe
- (Korea) Akimoto Kaijin
- (Korea) Lee Yoshiaki
- (Donetsk People's Republic) Vladislav Klyuyev
- (Luhansk People's Republic) Valeriy Titarenko
- (Northern Cyprus) Serhan Önet
- (Northern Cyprus) Uğur Gök
- (Abkhazia) Dmitri Kortava
- (Abkhazia) Ruslan Shoniya
- (South Ossetia) Alan Kadjaev
- (South Ossetia) Solsan Kochiev
- (Zakarpattia Oblast) David Robert
- (Zakarpattia Oblast) Ohar Roman
- (Zakarpattia Oblast) Zoltan Baksa
- (Zakarpattia Oblast) Kész Tibor
- (Padania) Ersid Pllumbaj
- (Greenland) Niels Svane
- (Greenland) Nukannguaq Zeeb
- (Greenland) Johan Bistrup
- (Greenland) Malik Juhl
- (Western Sahara) Hamid Mohammed
- Own goal
