= Ellan Vannin football team =

Unofficial national football team representing the Isle of Man

Ellan Vannin
- Association: Manx International Football Alliance
- Confederation: ConIFA
- Head coach: Chris Bass
- Captain: Frank Jones
- Most caps: Frank Jones (30)
- Top scorer: Frank Jones; Calum Morrissey (11)
- Home stadium: The Bowl
First colours	Second colours	Third colours

First international
- Ellan Vannin 10–0 Monaco (Douglas, Isle of Man; 6 April 2014)

Biggest win
- Ellan Vannin 14–0 Chagos Islands (Douglas, Isle of Man; 13 August 2017)

Biggest defeat
- Occitania 5–1 Ellan Vannin (Toulouse, France; 30 December 2014)

ConIFA World Football Cup
- Appearances: 2 (first in 2014)
- Best result: Runners-up (2014)

ConIFA European Football Cup
- Appearances: 2 (first in 2015)
- Best result: Third Place (2015)

The Ellan Vannin Football Team is a football team that represents the Isle of Man. It is not affiliated with FIFA or UEFA, and therefore cannot compete in the FIFA World Cup or in the UEFA European Championship.

Unlike the Isle of Man official football team which selects players who play in for clubs in the Manx league regardless of nationality, the Ellan Vannin team selects those of Manx nationality no matter where they are based.

They competed first at the ConIFA World Football Cup in 2014, where they won their group and became runners-up to the County of Nice.

== History ==
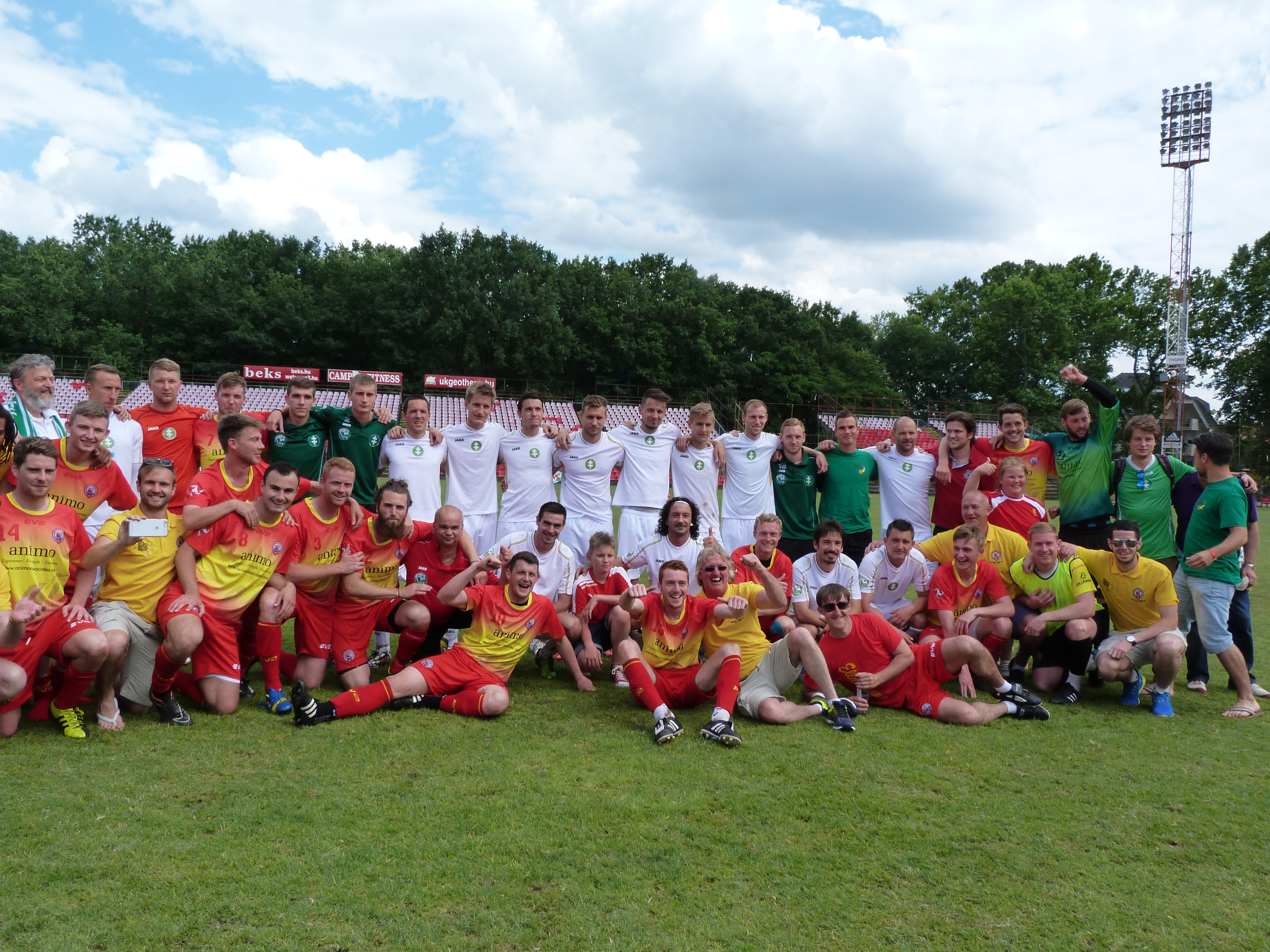
Ellan Vannin – Felvidék – Debrecen, 2015.06.21

=== Formation and early games ===
Formed in 2013, the Ellan Vannin team was created by the newly formed Manx International Football Alliance (MIFA) in order to enter ConIFA and compete at the ConIFA World Football Cup. As opposed to the official Isle of Man team (run by the Isle of Man FA), which is composed entirely of Isle of Man Football League players – regardless of nationality, Ellan Vannin will allow only those with Manx ties to play for them, in line with FIFA eligibility rules.

Following the signing of a memorandum of understanding between the MIFA and Isle of Man FA, intended to set out a working relationship between the two organisations, the MIFA announced that the first international to be played by Ellan Vannin would be a home game against Monaco on 6 April 2014, to be played at The Bowl in Douglas. Ellan Vannin won their first international 10–0.

=== Entry into ConIFA and 2014 ConIFA World Cup ===
Ellan Vannin were invited to participate in the first ConIFA World Football Cup in Sápmi, in 2014. Despite being a previously unknown quantity, they reached the final of the inaugural tournament, losing on penalties to County of Nice despite winning 4–2 over them in the Group Stage thanks to a Calum Morrissey hattrick.

=== 2015 ConIFA European Cup and 2016 ConIFA World Cup ===
While the Isle of Man was originally set to host the 2015 ConIFA European Football Cup in June 2015, logistical problems eventually led to the tournament being moved to Székely Land. Here, despite defeat to Padania in the Group Stage, they still achieved a semi-final place where they were again defeated by the County of Nice. A penalty win over Felvidék in the play-off saw them finish third. The next year, Ellan Vannin was set to appear in the 2016 ConIFA World Football Cup, but withdrew after being advised by the British Home Office not to travel to Abkhazia, where the tournament was to be held.

=== 2017 European Football Cup, 2018 World Football Cup and Expulsion ===
The team returned to ConIFA activity in 2017 for the 2017 ConIFA European Football Cup in Northern Cyprus, finishing 6th. However, the team qualified for the 2018 ConIFA World Football Cup to be held in London (hosted by Barawa). In late 2017 it was announced that they would become the first opponents of the new Yorkshire national football team on 28 January 2018. After Yorkshire's membership to ConIFA was confirmed at the beginning of January, it meant that it would become an officially sanctioned friendly that would provide qualification points for future competitions. In May that year they took part in the 2018 ConIFA World Football Cup in London. However, after being knocked out by Barawa in the group stage, the MIFA protested at their opponents' alleged use of an ineligible player. After the other competing clubs voted to reject their appeal, Ellan Vannin withdrew from the tournament, and following a number of accusations made by the MIFA on social media against ConIFA, they were provisionally expelled from the organisation on 7 June 2018. Ellan Vannin were reinstated as full members at ConIFA's 2019 AGM in January 2019.

== Fixtures and Results ==
=== 2014 ===
6 April 2014 Friendly	Ellan Vannin (Isle of Man)	10–0	Monaco	Jämtkraft Arena, Östersund
	Ciaran McNulty 1'; Calum Morrissey 2', 45'; Julian Ringham (?); Sean Quaye 66'; Chris Bass Jr 69'; Joey Morling (?); Sam Caine (?)			Attendance: The Bowl, Douglas

1 June 2014 2014 ConIFA World Football Cup	Ellan Vannin (Isle of Man)	3–2	Artsakh	Jämtkraft Arena, Östersund
19:00	Ciaran McNulty 41'; Antony Moore 88'; Frank Jones 90'		Mihran Manasyan 27', 31'

2 June 2014 2014 ConIFA World Football Cup	Ellan Vannin (Isle of Man)	4–2	County of Nice	Jämtkraft Arena, Östersund
19:00	Calum Morrissey 16', 31', 35'; Daniel Bell 87'		Frank Delerue 37'; Malik Tchokounte 74'

4 June 2014 2014 ConIFA World Football Cup	Ellan Vannin (Isle of Man)	1–1 (4–2 p)	Kurdistan Region	Jämtkraft Arena, Östersund
19:00	Seamus Sharkey 80'		Khaled Mushir 23'
	Penalties
	Ciaran McNulty (penalty scored); Calum Morrissey (penalty scored); Chris Bass Jr (penalty scored); Jack McVey (penalty scored)		(penalty missed) Khaled Mushir; (penalty missed) Sherzad Mohammed; (penalty scored) Younis Shakour; (penalty scored) Ahmed Salar

6 June 2014 2014 ConIFA World Football Cup	Arameans Suryoye	1–4	(Isle of Man) Ellan Vannin	Jämtkraft Arena, Östersund
19:00	Rabi Mourad 9'		Frank Jones 23'; Jack McVey 60'; Chris Bass Jr 70'; Ciaran McNulty 72'

8 June 2014 2014 ConIFA World Football Cup	County of Nice	0–0 (5–3 p)	(Isle of Man) Ellan Vannin	Jämtkraft Arena, Östersund
13:00		Report
	Penalties
	Gilles Noto (penalty scored); Baptiste Delfino (penalty scored); Loic Malitini (penalty scored); Frank Delerue (penalty scored); Hichem Ferreri (penalty scored)		Ciaran McNulty (penalty scored); Calum Morrisey (penalty scored); Chris Bass (penalty missed); Jack McVey (penalty scored)

30 December 2014 Friendly	Occitania	5–1	(Isle of Man) Ellan Vannin	Toulouse

=== 2015 ===
30 May 2015 Niamh Challenge Cup	Ellan Vannin (Isle of Man)	8–1	Panjab	The Bowl, Douglas
15:00 BST	Sean Quaye 11', 37'; Ciaran McNulty 15'; Conor Doyle 44'; Frank Jones 50', 55'; Furo Davies 67'; Liam Doyle 75'		? 28'	Referee: Andrew Lodge (Isle of Man)

31 May 2015 Niamh Challenge Cup Final	Felvidék	1–3	(Isle of Man) Ellan Vannin	The Bowl, Douglas
17:30 BST	Attila Dálnoky 72'	Report	Ciaran McNulty 20'; Sam Caine 25'; Conor Doyle 88'

18 June 2015 2015 ConIFA European Football Cup	Romani people	1–3	(Isle of Man) Ellan Vannin	Stadion Oláh Gábor Út, Debrecen
16:00	Irhas 29'	Report	Sharkey 11'; Jones 49'; Bass 55'

19 June 2015 2015 ConIFA European Football Cup	Padania	1–0	(Isle of Man) Ellan Vannin	Stadion Oláh Gábor Út, Debrecen
15:00	Prandelli

20 June 2015 2015 ConIFA European Football Cup	County of Nice	3–1	(Isle of Man) Ellan Vannin
15:00	Delerue; Floridi; Girand		Jones

21 June 2015 2015 ConIFA European Football Cup	Ellan Vannin (Isle of Man)	1–1 (5–3 p)	Felvidék
13:00	Bass		Magyar

=== 2017 ===
5 June 2017 2017 ConIFA European Football Cup	Padania	1–0	Ellan Vannin	Üner Berkalp Stadium, Morphou
20:00 EEST	Rota 70'

6 June 2017 2017 ConIFA European Football Cup	Ellan Vannin	1–0	Felvidék	Üner Berkalp Stadium, Morphou
20:00 EEST	Bass 52'

7 June 2017 2017 ConIFA European Football Cup	Ellan Vannin	2–4	Székely Land	Mete Adanır Stadium, Kyrenia
20:00 EEST	McNultey 79', 86'		Bajkó 13', 36', 69' (pen.), 75'

9 June 2017 2017 ConIFA European Football Cup	Kárpátalja	3–3 (5–4 p)	Ellan Vannin	Üner Berkalp Stadium, Morphou
20:00 EEST	Kelly 2' (o.g.); Fodor 30'; Kész 61'		Cown 23'; Cannell 61'; Doyle 83'

12 August 2017 Niamh Challenge Cup	Ellan Vannin (Isle of Man)	6–2	Barawa	London

13 August 2017 Niamh Challenge Cup	Ellan Vannin (Isle of Man)	14–0	Chagos Islands	London

=== 2018 ===
28 January 2018 Friendly	Yorkshire	1–1	Ellan Vannin	Fitzwilliam, England
15:30 GMT	Coduri 54'		Davies 48'	Stadium: Yorkshire NuBuilds Stadium; Attendance: 627; Referee: Steve Lynch

29 April 2018 Friendly	Ellan Vannin	2–1	Panjab	Sandbach, England
	Gale 22'; Simpson 72'	Report	90'	Stadium: Sandbach Community Football Centre

31 May 2018 2018 ConIFA WFC Group A	Ellan Vannin	4–1	Cascadia	Sutton, England
12:00 BST	Whitley 15'; Jones 41'; Caine 62'; McVey 70'	Report	Doughty 18'	Stadium: Gander Green Lane

2 June 2018 2018 ConIFA WFC Group A	Ellan Vannin	2–0	Tamil Eelam	Carshalton, England
14:00 BST	Whitley 47'; Caine 57'	Report		Stadium: Colston Avenue; Attendance: 276; Referee: Guastafierro Mario

3 June 2018 2018 ConIFA WFC Group A	Barawa	2–0	Ellan Vannin	Haringey, England
14:00 BST	Bettamer 40'; Ismail 56'	Report		Stadium: Coles Park

== Personalities of Ellan Vannin's football team ==
=== Squad ===
The following players were called up to the 22 man squad for the 2018 ConIFA World Football Cup to commence on 31 May 2018. Caps and goals correct as of 3 June 2018 after the game against Barawa.

No.	Pos.	Player	Date of birth (age)	Caps	Goals	Club
1	GK	Andy Perry	19 May 1982 (aged 36)	14	0	(Isle of Man Football Association) Ramsey AFC
25	GK	Dean Kearns	17 June 1993 (aged 24)	5	0	(Isle of Man Football Association) Rushen United
14	DF	Jack McVey	13 January 1991 (aged 27)	21	3	(Isle of Man Football Association) St Georges
2	DF	Sam Caine	26 May 1988 (aged 30)	18	4	(Isle of Man Football Association) St Georges
4	DF	Sean Quaye	19 August 1984 (aged 33)	17	3	(Isle of Man Football Association) St Georges
17	DF	Cameron Lee	22 August 1993 (aged 24)	3	0	(Isle of Man Football Association) Corinthians
15	DF	Darren Cain	2 April 1988 (aged 30)	2	0	(Isle of Man Football Association) Corinthians
7	DF	Tom Callister	28 March 1994 (aged 24)	1	0	(Isle of Man Football Association) Corinthians
24	DF	Andrew Burkitt	3 August 2000 (aged 17)	0	0	(Isle of Man Football Association) Laxey
8	MF	Frank Jones (captain)	22 October 1987 (aged 30)	30	17	(Isle of Man Football Association) St Georges
11	MF	Joey Morling	3 January 1997 (aged 21)	12	3	(Isle of Man Football Association) St Georges
18	MF	Dan Bell	26 January 1986 (aged 32)	10	2	(Isle of Man Football Association) Peel
21	MF	Mike Williams	19 August 1994 (aged 23)	7	3	(Isle of Man Football Association) Rushen United
5	MF	Daniel Simpson	28 July 1995 (aged 22)	7	2	(Isle of Man Football Association) Corinthians
10	MF	Alex Holden	12 January 1996 (aged 22)	6	3	(The Football Association) Bottesford Town
3	MF	Joel Ibañez	2 October 1993 (aged 24)	4	0	(Isle of Man Football Association) St Georges
6	MF	Joey Quayle	4 March 1999 (aged 19)	4	0	(Isle of Man Football Association) St Georges
22	MF	Brodie Patience	7 February 1998 (aged 20)	2	0	(Isle of Man Football Association) Corinthians
12	MF	Ryan Burns	18 March 1994 (aged 24)	1	0	(Isle of Man Football Association) Corinthians
9	FW	Ciaran McNulty	1 July 1987 (aged 30)	13	8	(Isle of Man Football Association) St Georges
16	FW	Stephen Whitley	20 February 1995 (aged 23)	9	5	(Isle of Man Football Association) Corinthians
20	FW	Furo Davies	21 December 1988 (aged 29)	8	6	(Isle of Man Football Association) St Georges
23	FW	Sean Doyle	11 July 1994 (aged 23)	7	3	(Isle of Man Football Association) Corinthians

=== Recent callups ===
Pos.	Player	Date of birth (age)	Caps	Goals	Club	Latest call-up
DF	Séamus Sharkey	11 May 1990 (age 36)	9	2	(Northern Ireland) Glenavon	2018 ConIFA World Football Cup^{WD}
DF	Julian Ringham	3 June 1984 (aged 33)	5	0	(Isle of Man) St Georges	2018 ConIFA World Football Cup^{WD}
DF	Conor Doyle	16 February 1990 (age 36)	7	1	(United Arab Emirates) Elite FC Dubai	2018 ConIFA World Football Cup^{PRE}
DF	Thomas Smith	23 October 1997 (age 28)	3	0	(Isle of Man) Corinthians	2018 ConIFA World Football Cup^{PRE}
DF	Sam Ingham	21 August 1991 (age 35)	1	0	(Isle of Man) St Johns United	2018 ConIFA World Football Cup^{PRE}
MF	Lee Gale	6 August 1991 (age 35)	4	5	(Isle of Man) Peel	2018 ConIFA World Football Cup^{WD}
MF	Stephen Riding	30 April 1988 (age 38)	5	0	(Isle of Man) Rushen United	2018 ConIFA World Football Cup^{PRE}
MF	Rhys Oates	17 June 1995 (age 31)	4	0	(Isle of Man) St Johns United	2018 ConIFA World Football Cup^{PRE}
FW	Stephen Priestnal	4 January 1984 (age 42)	0	0	(Isle of Man) St Mary's	2018 ConIFA World Football Cup^{PRE}

=== Managers ===
N°	Manager	Period	Played	Won	Drawn	Lost	Win %
1	Lee Dixon	2014–2015	13	7	3	3	53.8
2	(Isle of Man) Alan Rogers	2016	5	3	0	2	60.0
3	(Isle of Man) Christopher Bass Snr	2017–2018	12	7	2	3	58.3
Totals			30	17	5	8	56.66

=== Presidents of the Manx International Football Alliance ===
N°	Name	Périod
1	(Isle of Man) Malcolm Blackburn	2014–?

== Competitive Record ==
=== ConIFA World Cup ===
Year	Round	Position	GP	W	D	L	GS	GA
(Sápmi) 2014	Final	2nd	5	3	2	0	12	6
(Abkhazia) 2016	Did not qualify							
(Barawa) 2018	Group Stage†	16th	3	2	0	1	6	3
(North Macedonia) 2020	Did not qualify							

† Ellan Vannin withdrew from the tournament after the group stage, their remaining knockout games were each given as walkovers.

=== ConIFA European Cup ===
Year	Round	Position	GP	W	D	L	GS	GA
(Székely Land) 2015	Semi Final	3rd	4	1	1	2	5	6
(Northern Cyprus) 2017	Group Stage	6th	4	1	1	2	6	8
(Republic of Artsakh) 2019	Did not qualify							
(Nice) 2022	Did not qualify							

== Honours ==
=== Non-FIFA competitions ===
- CONIFA World Football Cup
  - Runners-up (1): 2014
- CONIFA European Football Cup
  - Third place (1): 2015

== General references ==
- http://www.bbc.com/sport/football/26921628
- http://sportifmeseleler.blogspot.fr/2014/06/ellan-vannin-3-2-daglk-karabag-conifa.html
- http://archives.nicematin.com/nice/premiere-cruelle-pour-la-selecioun-de-nice-a-la-coupe-du-monde-conifa.1766079.html
- http://www.bbc.com/sport/football/27715858
- https://ejilgun.com/2014/06/07/arameans-come-up-short-against-ellan-vannin/
- http://www.bbc.com/news/world-europe-isle-of-man-27778930
- https://conifaofficial.wordpress.com/2014/12/30/friendly-occitania-ellan-vannin-5-1/
- http://www.bbc.com/sport/football/32957696
- http://archives.nicematin.com/derniere-minute/la-selecioun-en-finale-de-leuro-conifa.2258212.html
- https://hongrieactuelle.wordpress.com/2015/06/22/conifa-haute-hongrie-jouera-mondial-2016/
- https://www.stockporttownfc.co.uk/single-post/2017/05/30/Lions-Come-Up-Short-Against-Manx
- http://www.goalstream.org/match/101448070/817023da#/messages/gclub_club_10057334
- http://www.goalstream.org/match/101448073/5e39336f#/messages/gclub_club_10059550
- http://www.goalstream.org/match/101448074/711d1bd7#/messages/gclub_club_10059550
- http://www.rsssf.com/tablesn/nonfifa-coneuro17.html
- http://www.three.fm/news/isle-of-man-news/win-for-ellan-vannin-in-sweden/
- http://www.three.fm/news/isle-of-man-news/ellan-vannin-reach-semi-finals-of-conifa-world-football-cup/
- http://www.bbc.com/sport/football/27718273
- https://www.footballbloggingawards.co.uk/blog/football-blog-isle-of-man-national-team-ellan-vannin-world-football-cup/
- http://www.three.fm/news/isle-of-man-news/ellan-vannin-football-team-reach-international-final/
- http://www.bbc.com/sport/football/27715859
- https://www.energyfm.net/cms/news_story_321424.html
- http://www.bbc.com/sport/football/27760554
- http://www.three.fm/news/isle-of-man-news/ellan-vannin-defeated-but-mifa-sets-sights-on-next-competition/
- https://www.bbc.com/sport/football/32957696
- https://www.energyfm.net/cms/news_story_321468.html
- http://www.bbc.com/news/world-europe-isle-of-man-28675166
- http://www.three.fm/news/isle-of-man-news/ellan-vannin-wins-its-first-2015-conifa-euros-game/
- https://www.crowdfunder.co.uk/support-ellan-vannin-in-europeada-2016/?
- http://www.iomtoday.co.im/article.cfm?id=34223&headline=Heartbreak%20for%20Ellan%20Vannin&sectionIs=SPORT&searchyear=2017
- http://www.iomtoday.co.im/article.cfm?id=38658&headline=Football:%20Ellan%20Vannin%20line%20up%20another%20friendly&sectionIs=SPORT&searchyear=2018
- http://www.bbc.com/news/uk-england-leeds-42859583
- http://www.iomtoday.co.im/article.cfm?id=38311&headline=Ellan%20Vannin%20face%20Yorkshire%20in%20historic%20match&sectionIs=SPORT&searchyear=2018
- http://www.sandbachunitedfc.co.uk/news/the-england-universities-mens-football-squad-inter-2172136.html
- http://www.iomtoday.co.im/article.cfm?id=37975&headline=Football:%20Ellan%20Vannin%20find%20out%20opponents%20for%20ConIFA%20World%20Cup&sectionIs=SPORT&searchyear=2018
- http://www.manxradio.com/news/isle-of-man-sport/more-teams-for-niamh-challenge-cup/
- http://www.iomtoday.co.im/article.cfm?id=34896&headline=Ellan%20Vannin%20to%20play%20in%20charity%20tournament%20in%20August&sectionIs=SPORT&searchyear=2017
- http://www.europeada2016.eu/en/teams/gruppe-e/ellan-vannin/
- http://www.europeada2016.eu/en/tournament/results/?l=16&w=all
