= 2016 ConIFA World Football Cup qualification =

Football tournament stage

Tournament details
- Dates: 30 May 2015 – 6 September 2015
- Teams: 10 (from 1 confederation)

Tournament statistics
- Matches played: 15
- Goals scored: 56 (3.73 per match)
- Top scorer(s): (Raetia) Kastrie (6 goals)

The 2016 ConIFA World Football Cup qualification was a football competition to determine some of the participants of the 2016 ConIFA World Football Cup. This was the first time a qualification process was used for the ConIFA World Cup. The first qualification match was played on 30 May 2015 between the newly constituted Felvidék team and the team representing Alderney, with the first goal scored by Felvidék's Zoltán Novota.

== Background ==
The Confederation of Independent Football Associations (ConIFA) was founded in June 2013, as an organisation to represent football associations that are not eligible or choose not to join FIFA. One year later, it held its first official tournament, the 2014 ConIFA World Football Cup, in Sweden, to which the twelve participating teams were invited. The success of this tournament led to the decision to make it a biannual competition, with continental tournaments taking place in between, the first of which was the 2015 ConIFA European Football Cup.

During the planning process for the European Football Cup, ConIFA took the decision that, in addition to finding its first European champions, the competition would also serve as a qualification tournament for the 2016 World Football Cup, with the top three teams gaining automatic entry into the WFC. The finalised European Football Cup eventually featured a total of six teams, including both the current WFC champions, Countea de Nissea, and the runners up, Ellan Vannin. A number of the participants undertook warm-up games prior to the start of the tournament, with Ellan Vannin planning two charity games over the weekend of the 30–31 May against Alderney. However, in mid-May 2015, a few weeks prior to the fixtures taking place, the fixtures were cancelled and replaced by a four team tournament called the Niamh Challenge Cup, with Ellan Vannin and Alderney joined by teams representing Felvidék and Punjab. At the same time, ConIFA announced that they were officially sanctioning the tournament, with the winners gaining automatic entry to the WFC. A second tournament, the Benedikt Fontana Cup, hosted in Switzerland by the Fussballauswahl Raetia, was announced as taking place in parallel with the EFC in June 2015, with three participants, including the hosts Raetia, Felvidék and the Chagos Islands. ConIFA announced that this too would serve as a qualification tournament for the WFC, with the winner gaining automatic entry.

In addition to the qualification process that ConIFA put in place, the organisation announced in May that it had reached an agreement with the football association representing the Aymara people for their team to be the first South Americans to play at the World Football Cup.

On 7 July, ConIFA announced that Abkhazia had been selected as the host of the 2016 ConIFA World Football Cup, which confirmed their participation.

In December 2015, following advice from the UK Foreign and Commonwealth Office over security concerns regarding travel to Abkhazia, the Manx Independent Football Alliance announced that the Ellan Vannin team would withdraw from the World Football Cup, and instead take part in the 2016 Europeada Championship in Italy.

== Qualified teams ==
Team	Method of qualification	Date of qualification	Finals appearance	Previous appearance	Previous best performance	Notes
Aymará	Invitation	13 May 2015	1st	N/A	N/A	Subsequently, withdrew from competition
(Isle of Man) Ellan Vannin	Niamh Challenge Cup winners	31 May 2015	2nd	2014	Runners-up (2014)	Subsequently, withdrew from competition
Padania	European Football Cup Winner	21 June 2015	2nd	2014	5th place (2014)	Initially expelled from competition, but subsequently restored
County of Nice	European Football Cup Runner Up	21 June 2015	2nd	2014	Winners (2014)	Subsequently, withdrew from competition
Abkhazia	Host	7 July 2015	2nd	2014	8th place (2014)	
Raetia	Benedikt Fontana Cup Winners	6 September 2015	1st	N/A	N/A	

== Qualification ==
In the qualification process, Ellan Vannin and Felvidek had two opportunities to qualify; through the Niamh Challenge Cup and the ConIFA European Football Cup.

=== Niamh Challenge Cup ===
The Niamh Challenge Cup was a four-team knockout tournament held over two days; the winners of the two games played on the first day advanced to the final, with the winner of that game qualifying automatically for the WFC.

30 May 2015 Match 1	Alderney	1–2	Felvidék	The Bowl, Douglas
11:30 BST	Concacnen 60'		Novatar 40'; Dalonky 61'

30 May 2015 Match 2	Ellan Vannin (Isle of Man)	8–1	Panjab	The Bowl, Douglas
15:00 BST	Quaye 11', 37'; McNulty 15'; Doyle 44'; Jones 50', 55'; Davies 67'; Doyle 75'		? 28'	Referee: Andrew Lodge (Isle of Man)

31 May 2015 Final	Felvidék	1–3	(Isle of Man) Ellan Vannin	The Bowl, Douglas
17:30 BST	Dalnoky 72'	Report	McNulty 20'; Caine 25'; Doyle 88'

=== 2015 European Football Cup ===
The 2015 European Football Cup featured a total of six teams, divided into two groups of three for the first round. The top two in each group advanced to the semi-finals. The winner of the tournament, runner-up and team that finished third were automatically awarded places in the 2016 World Football Cup.

Key to colours in group tables
Teams that advanced to the semi-finals

Group A
Team	Pld	W	D	L	GF	GA	GD	Pts
County of Nice	2	2	0	0	7	3	+4	6
Felvidék	2	1	0	1	4	5	−1	3
Székely Land	2	0	0	2	3	6	−3	0

Group B
Team	Pld	W	D	L	GF	GA	GD	Pts
Padania	2	2	0	0	4	2	+2	6
(Isle of Man) Ellan Vannin	2	1	0	1	3	2	+1	3
Romani people	2	0	0	2	3	6	−3	0

20 June 2015 Semi-final 1	County of Nice	3–1	(Isle of Man) Ellan Vannin	Stadion Oláh Gábor Út, Debrecen
15:00 CEST	Delerue; Floridi; Girand		Jones

20 June 2015 Semi-final 2	Padania	5–0	Felvidék	Stadion Oláh Gábor Út, Debrecen
18:00 CEST	Prandelli; Mazzotti; De Peralta; Baruwah

21 June 2015 3rd place match	Ellan Vannin (Isle of Man)	1–1 (5–3 p)	Felvidék	Stadion Oláh Gábor Út, Debrecen
13:00 CEST	Bass		Magyar

21 June 2015 Final	County of Nice	1–4	Padania	Stadion Oláh Gábor Út, Debrecen
16:00	Delerue		Tignonsini; De Peralta; Prandelli

=== Benedikt Fontana Cup ===
The Benedikt Fontana Cup was planned as a two-game tournament held over two days in June 2015 between Raetia and the Chagos Islands, with the winners automatically qualifying for the World Football Cup. The competition was originally planned as a three-team tournament, with Panjab and Felvidek due to take part alongside the hosts. Panjab were forced to withdraw in May 2015, and were replaced by the Chagos Islands. Subsequently, Felvidek also withdrew, leaving it as a two-legged tie, with the winner (and qualification place) decided by the aggregate score. In June 2015, just prior to the event taking place, the competition was cancelled by the Raetia FA as a result of the Chagos team pulling out, and rescheduled for August 2015. The Raetia FA announced that the tournament would be played as a single game against Franconia on Sunday 6 September.

6 September 2015	Raetia	6–0	Franconia	Fussballplätze Ringstrasse, Chur
13:00 CET	Kastrie
