= CONIFA World Football Cup =

- Founded: 2014; 12 years ago
- Region: International
- Current champions: Kárpátalja (1st title)
- Most championships: Abkhazia; County of Nice; Kárpátalja (1 title each)
- 2024 CONIFA World Football Cup

The CONIFA World Football Cup is an international association football tournament organized by CONIFA, an umbrella association for states, minorities, stateless peoples and regions unaffiliated with FIFA, which has been held every two years since 2014. This tournament is the successor of the Viva World Cup which was held from 2006 to 2012.

== Hosting ==
Map of CONIFA World Football Cup Tournaments

CONIFA is an organisation that provides an outlet for countries, sub-national entities, stateless peoples and ethnic minorities to play international football. Because a number of their members represent diasporas or displaced peoples, it is not always possible for the host of the World Football Cup to be able to hold the competition in their own "territory". As a consequence of this, CONIFA defines the "host" of the World Football Cup as being the member association that heads the organising committee, whether or not the tournament is actually played in the geographical area that the host association represents.

== History ==
=== Sápmi 2014 ===
In May 2013, CONIFA announced that Sápmi had been chosen to host the inaugural CONIFA World Football Cup in Östersund, Sweden. It was an invitational tournament played between 1 and 8 June 2014, with all matches being held in the 5092-capacity Jämtkraft Arena.

Twelve teams took part in the tournament. Catalonia and Rapa Nui were thought to be potential participants, but ultimately declined or withdrew.

In parallel with the tournament, a festival celebrating the cultural diversity of the teams involved was held in Östersund.

Of the twelve invited teams, eight had previously participated at the Viva World Cup.

The draw initially included Quebec and Zanzibar. However, in May 2014, it was announced that both Quebec and Zanzibar had withdrawn from the tournament. The Quebec team had affiliated with the Fédération de soccer du Québec, with the intention that the FSQ eventually apply for membership of CONCACAF. To this end, the team will only play internationals against full national teams that are members of either CONCACAF or FIFA, and will no longer participate in Non-FIFA Football. The Zanzibar team were unable to obtain visas to enter Sweden and were thus forced to pull out of the tournament. Quebec's place was taken by South Ossetia, while Zanzibar were replaced by County of Nice.

=== Abkhazia 2016 ===
The 2016 tournament was the first to feature a measure of qualification, rather than all of the teams being invited. In April 2015, CONIFA, during its announcement of the final make up of the 2015 European Football Cup, that the top three teams in that competition would gain automatic entry into the 2016 WFC. Also in April, the Ellan Vannin team announced it would play two charity matches against Alderney, which would also serve as warm up games for the Island Games tournament in which both Alderney and the Isle of Man were competing. Subsequently, in May 2015, two weeks before the scheduled dates of the two games, CONIFA and the MIFA announced that it had been expanded to four teams, with both Panjab and Felvidék also taking part; CONIFA also announced that the winner of the expanded Niamh Challenge Cup would gain automatic entry into the 2016 World Football Cup. A further four team tournament, the Benedikt Fontana Cup, was announced to be hosted by the Raetia FA to run during the European Football Cup. This would also feature Felvidék, as well as the hosts and Chagos Islands, and would also serve as a qualification tournament for the World Football Cup.

In December 2015, following advice from the UK Foreign and Commonwealth Office over security concerns regarding travel to Abkhazia, the Manx Independent Football Alliance announced that the Ellan Vannin team would withdraw from the World Football Cup, and instead take part in the 2016 Europeada Championship in Italy, like Occitania. Subsequently, both the Aymará team, and County of Nice also withdrew.

In March 2016, CONIFA announced that Padania had been expelled from the tournament due to procedural irregularities, to be replaced by Székely Land. However, three weeks prior to the start of the tournament, it was announced that Padania had been reinstated, taking the place of the Romani people team, who had been forced to withdraw due to difficulties with their travel documents.

=== Barawa 2018 ===
The 2018 competition saw the tournament expanded from 12 to 16 teams, and featured a full set of qualification criteria as laid down by CONIFA. In addition to the various friendly tournaments sanctioned as qualifiers, the 2018 tournament featured ranking points awarded for games played by members, which went towards the awarding of various continental places to CONIFA's various geographical zones. For the first time, teams from both North America and Oceania gained places in the competition.

In June 2017, at the CONIFA meeting held during the 2017 CONIFA European Football Cup in Northern Cyprus, it was announced that Barawa would be the hosts of the 2018 World Football Cup, with the announcement of the actual location of the tournament (owing to the Barawa FA representing part of the Somali diaspora and being located in the United Kingdom) subsequently announced as London in September 2017. The tournament was documented by Irish journalist James Hendicott in the book CONIFA: Football for the Forgotten.

=== North Macedonia 2020 (cancelled) ===
In January 2019, at the CONIFA Annual General Meeting in Kraków, Poland, Somaliland was voted in a non-binding vote before the decision was finalized by the executive committee the following day. The 2020 competition will be the first CONIFA World Football Cup to be hosted outside Europe, with previous host Barawa holding the competition in London. However, on the 19th of August 2019 Conifa announced that the cup would not be held in Somaliland due to logistical difficulties. In December 2019 CONIFA announced that the relocated tournament would take place in Skopje, North Macedonia. On 23 March 2020 CONIFA announced that the tournament will not be taking place in North Macedonia from 30 May – 7 June because of the COVID-19 pandemic. The Tournament was eventually cancelled by CONIFA with the organisation outlining plans to expand continental tournaments.

=== Kurdistan Region - Iraq 2024 (cancelled) ===
On 9 May 2023, ConIFA announced on its official twitter account that the 2024 CONIFA World Cup hosting rights had been awarded to Kurdistan FA. On 30 April 2024 the Kurdistan Football Association announced that the tournament would be postponed until "Summer 2025" citing security concerns preventing some teams from travelling to the region. On 9 September 2024 CONIFA announced that the Kurdistan Football Association was suspended after withdrawing from hosting the 2024 tournament, and the revised 2025 tournament, until a fee had been paid. The tournament was subsequently cancelled.

== Results ==
Ed.	Year	Host	First place game			Third place game			Num. teams
Ed.	Year	Host	(gold) Champion	Score	(silver) Runner-up	(bronze) Third	Score	Fourth	Num. teams
1	2014	Sápmi (Note: Sapmi association named as official host; matches were held in Ostersund, Sweden.)	County of Nice	0–0 (5–3 p)	(Isle of Man); Ellan Vannin	Arameans Suryoye	4–1	South Ossetia	12
2	2016	Abkhazia	Abkhazia	1–1 (6–5 p)	Panjab	Northern Cyprus	2–0	Padania	12
3	2018	Barawa (Note: Barawa association named as official host; matches were held in London, United Kingdom)	Kárpátalja	0–0 (3–2 p)	Northern Cyprus	Padania	0–0 (5–4 p)	Székely Land	16
~~4~~	~~2020~~	North Macedonia	(Cancelled due to COVID-19 pandemic)						16
~~4~~	~~2024~~	Kurdistan Region	(Cancelled due to "security concerns")						16

== Appearances ==
Legend

- 1st — Champions
- 2nd — Runners-up
- 3rd — Third place
- 4th — Fourth place
- QF — Quarterfinals
- PR — Placement Round (bottom placed teams in group stage)
- q — Qualified for upcoming tournament
- •• — Qualified but withdrew
- • — Did not qualify
- × — Did not enter / Withdrew / Banned / Entry not accepted by CONIFA
- — Hosts

For each tournament, the number of teams in each finals tournament (in brackets) are shown.

Team	2014 (Sápmi) (12)	2016 (Abkhazia) (12)	2018 (Ogaden) (16)	Total participations
Abkhazia	QF	1st	PR	3/3
Arameans Suryoye	3rd	•	•	1/3
Artsakh	PR	•	•	1/3
Barawa	×	×	QF	1/3
Cascadia	×	×	QF	1/3
Chagos Islands	•	PR	•	1/3
County of Nice	1st	••	•	1/3
Darfur	PR	•	•	1/3
Ellan Vannin	2nd	••	PR	2/3
Kabylie	×	×	PR	1/3
Kárpátalja	×	×	1st	1/3
Kurdistan Region	QF	QF	•	2/3
Matabeleland	×	×	PR	1/3
Northern Cyprus	•	3rd	2nd	2/3
Occitania	QF	••	•	1/3
Padania	QF	4th	3rd	3/3
Panjab	•	2nd	QF	2/3
Raetia	•	PR	•	1/3
Sápmi	PR	QF	•	2/3
Somaliland	•	PR	•	1/3
South Ossetia	4th	•	•	1/3
Székely Land	•	PR	4th	2/3
Tamil Eelam	PR	•	PR	2/3
Tibet	×	×	PR	1/3
Tuvalu	×	×	PR	1/3
United Koreans in Japan	•	QF	PR	2/3
Western Armenia	•	QF	QF	2/3

== Top goalscorers ==
In total, 27 teams have played, and across 3 editions, there have been 413 goals scored in 97 matches. Below are the Top scorers of CONIFA World Cup

Rank	player	Team	Goals	Caps
1	Matteo Prandelli	(Padania)	10	
1	Amar Purewal	(Panjab)	10	
3	Giacomo Innocenti	(Padania)	9	
3	Artur Yelbayev	(South Ossetia)	9	5
5	Prashanth Ragavan	(Tamil Eelam)	8	

== See also ==
- Non-FIFA international football
