= 2014 ConIFA World Football Cup =

Tournament details
- Host country: Sweden (Host association: Sápmi)
- Dates: 1 June – 8 June
- Teams: 12
- Venue: 1 (in 1 host city)

Final positions
- Champions: County of Nice (1st title)
- Runners-up: (Isle of Man) Ellan Vannin
- Third place: Arameans Suryoye
- Fourth place: South Ossetia

Tournament statistics
- Matches played: 28
- Goals scored: 140 (5 per match)
- Top scorer: Artur Elbaev (9 goals)

The 2014 ConIFA World Football Cup was the first edition of the ConIFA World Football Cup, an international football tournament for states, minorities, stateless peoples and regions unaffiliated with FIFA organised by ConIFA and a successor of Viva World Cup, last held in 2012. The tournament was hosted by FA Sápmi in the Sápmi region, with all games held in the city of Östersund in Sweden.

== Tournament ==
Twelve teams took part in the tournament. Catalonia and Rapa Nui were thought to be potential participants, but ultimately declined or withdrew.

=== Hosts ===
In May 2013 ConIFA announced that Sápmi had been chosen to host the inaugural ConIFA World Football Cup in Östersund, Sweden. It was an invitational tournament played between 1 and 8 June 2014, with all matches being held in the 6626-capacity Jämtkraft Arena.

Sápmi

Östersund
Jämtkraft Arena
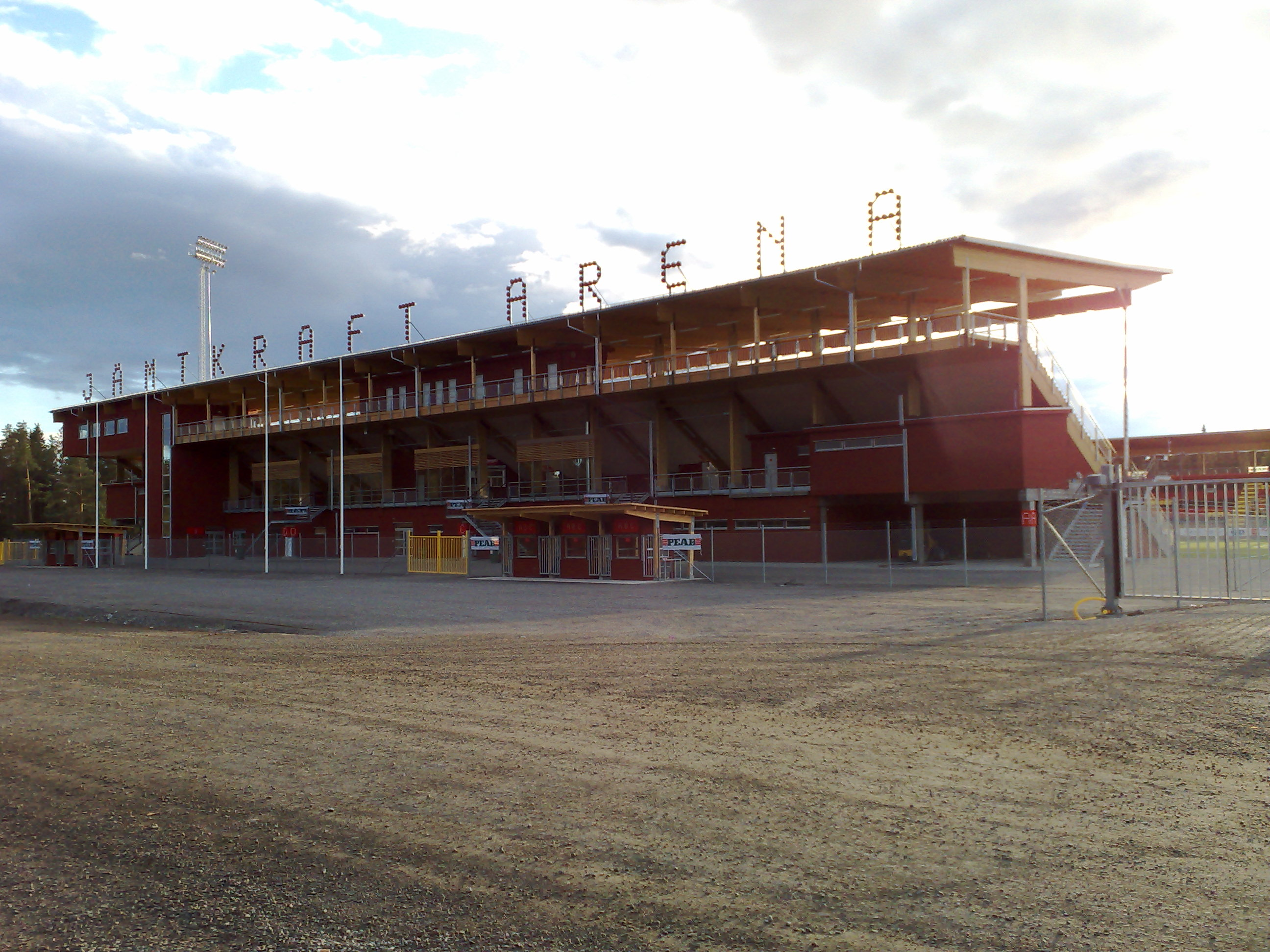
63°11′41.47″N 14°39′21.05″E
Capacity: 6,626

In parallel with the tournament, a festival celebrating the cultural diversity of the teams involved was held in Östersund.

== Participants ==
The twelve participating teams were drawn into the four groups of three teams each for the group stage. In preparation for this, the teams were organised into three pots. The draw was made by ConIFA World President Per-Anders Blind in Östersund on 24 March 2014.

| Pot 1 | Pot 2 | Pot 3 |
|---|---|---|
| Kurdistan Region; Padania; Sápmi; Zanzibar | Arameans Suryoye; Nagorno-Karabakh; Occitania; Quebec | Abkhazia; Darfur; (Isle of Man) Ellan Vannin; Tamil Eelam |

Of the twelve invited teams, eight had previously participated at the Viva World Cup.

=== Withdrawals ===
The draw initially placed Quebec in Group C and Zanzibar in Group D. However, in May 2014, it was announced that both Quebec and Zanzibar had withdrawn from the tournament. The Quebec team had affiliated with the Fédération de soccer du Québec, with the intention that the FSQ eventually apply for membership of CONCACAF. To this end, the team will only play internationals against full national teams that are members of either CONCACAF or FIFA, and will no longer participate in Non-FIFA Football. The Zanzibar team were unable to obtain visas to enter Sweden and were thus forced to pull out of the tournament. Quebec's place was taken by South Ossetia, while Zanzibar were replaced by County of Nice.

== Matches ==
=== Group stage ===
Key to colours in group tables
| Teams that advanced to the quarter-finals |

==== Group A ====
| Team | Pld | W | D | L | GF | GA | GD | Pts |
|---|---|---|---|---|---|---|---|---|
| Arameans Suryoye | 2 | 2 | 0 | 0 | 4 | 1 | +3 | 6 |
| Kurdistan Region | 2 | 1 | 0 | 1 | 10 | 2 | +8 | 3 |
| Tamil Eelam | 2 | 0 | 0 | 2 | 0 | 11 | −11 | 0 |

1 June 2014
13:00

| Kurdistan Region | 1–2 | Arameans Suryoye |
|---|---|---|
| Shakour 38' | | Karli 78'; Candemir 84' |

Jämtkraft Arena, Östersund

2 June 2014
10:00

| Tamil Eelam | 0–2 | Arameans Suryoye |
|---|---|---|
| | | Aydin 36'; Karli 48' |

Jämtkraft Arena, Östersund

3 June 2014
10:00

| Tamil Eelam | 0–9 | Kurdistan Region |
|---|---|---|
| | | Aras 17'; Ahmed 23', 35'; Younes 28'; Shukri 31'; Ali; Shakor 62', 86', 90+4' |

Jämtkraft Arena, Östersund

==== Group B ====
| Team | Pld | W | D | L | GF | GA | GD | Pts |
|---|---|---|---|---|---|---|---|---|
| Abkhazia | 2 | 1 | 1 | 0 | 3 | 2 | +1 | 4 |
| Occitania | 2 | 1 | 1 | 0 | 2 | 1 | +1 | 4 |
| Sápmi | 2 | 0 | 0 | 2 | 1 | 3 | −2 | 0 |

1 June 2014
16:00

| Abkhazia | 1–1 | Occitania |
|---|---|---|
| Hernandez 83' (o.g.) | | Martinez 68' |

Jämtkraft Arena, Östersund

2 June 2014
16:00

| Abkhazia | 2–1 | Sápmi |
|---|---|---|
| Vardania 19'; Argun 72' | | Kanth 51' |

Jämtkraft Arena, Östersund

3 June 2014
16:00

| Occitania | 1–0 | Sápmi |
|---|---|---|
| Lafuente 47' |

Jämtkraft Arena, Östersund

==== Group C ====
| Team | Pld | W | D | L | GF | GA | GD | Pts |
|---|---|---|---|---|---|---|---|---|
| Padania | 2 | 2 | 0 | 0 | 23 | 1 | +22 | 6 |
| South Ossetia | 2 | 1 | 0 | 1 | 20 | 3 | +17 | 3 |
| Darfur | 2 | 0 | 0 | 2 | 0 | 39 | −39 | 0 |

1 June 2014
10:00

| Darfur | 0–20 | Padania |
|---|---|---|
| | | Garavelli 2', 13', 24'; Innocenti 4', 10', 27', 39'; Rota 11', 26'; Nannini 16'; Mosti 46'; Prandelli 48', 57', 81', 87'; Barwuah 50', 54'; Mussi 62', 64', 69' |

Jämtkraft Arena, Östersund

2 June 2014
13:00

| Darfur | 0–19 | South Ossetia |
|---|---|---|
| | | Elbaev 10', 39', 42', 62', 75', 76', 82', 88'; Salbiev 13', 40'; Kobaldze 45'; Khutiev 56', 59', 70', 79', 90'; Kudziev 63'; Kulov 68'; Tskhovrebov 90+1' |

Jämtkraft Arena, Östersund

3 June 2014
13:00

| South Ossetia | 1–3 | Padania |
|---|---|---|
| Elbaev 46' | | Innocenti 6'; Mussi 37'; Barwuah 86' |

Jämtkraft Arena, Östersund

==== Group D ====
| Team | Pld | W | D | L | GF | GA | GD | Pts |
|---|---|---|---|---|---|---|---|---|
| (Isle of Man) Ellan Vannin | 2 | 2 | 0 | 0 | 7 | 4 | +3 | 6 |
| County of Nice | 2 | 1 | 0 | 1 | 3 | 4 | −1 | 3 |
| Nagorno-Karabakh | 2 | 0 | 0 | 2 | 2 | 4 | −2 | 0 |

1 June 2014
19:00

| Ellan Vannin (Isle of Man) | 3–2 | Nagorno-Karabakh |
|---|---|---|
| McNulty 41'; Moore 88'; Jones 90' | | Manasyan 27', 31' |

Jämtkraft Arena, Östersund

2 June 2014
19:00

| Ellan Vannin (Isle of Man) | 4–2 | County of Nice |
|---|---|---|
| Morrissey 16', 31', 35'; Bell 87' | | Delerue 37'; Tchokounte 74' |

Jämtkraft Arena, Östersund

3 June 2014
19:00

| Nagorno-Karabakh | 0–1 | County of Nice |
|---|---|---|
| | | Sborgni 7' |

Jämtkraft Arena, Östersund

=== Knockout stage ===
Quarter-finals
4 June – Östersund
Padania | 1
County of Nice | 2
4 June – Östersund
Abkhazia | 0 (0)
South Ossetia | 0 (2)
4 June – Östersund
Arameans Suryoye | 0 (7)
Occitania | 0 (6)
4 June – Östersund
(Isle of Man) Ellan Vannin | 1 (4)
Kurdistan Region | 1 (2)

Semi-finals
6 June – Östersund
County of Nice | 3
South Ossetia | 0
6 June – Östersund
Arameans Suryoye | 1
(Isle of Man) Ellan Vannin | 4

Final
8 June – Östersund
County of Nice | 0 (5)
(Isle of Man) Ellan Vannin | 0 (3)
Third place
8 June – Östersund
South Ossetia | 1
Arameans Suryoye | 4

==== Quarter-finals ====
4 June 2014
10:00

| Padania | 1–2 | County of Nice |
|---|---|---|
| Camussi 45+1' | | Malatini 8'; Tchokounte 85' |

Jämtkraft Arena, Östersund

4 June 2014
13:00

| Abkhazia | 0–0 | South Ossetia |
Penalties
| Akhmat Agrba (penalty missed); Sandrik Tsveyba (penalty missed); Dmitri Akhba (penalty missed); Georgij Zhanava (penalty missed) | 0–2 | (penalty missed) Alan Khadarzev; (penalty scored) David Siukaev; (penalty missed) Taimuraz Karatsev; (penalty scored) Taimuraz Kudziev |

Jämtkraft Arena, Östersund

4 June 2014
16:00

| Arameans Suryoye | 0–0 | Occitania |
Penalties
| Lukas Can (penalty scored); Thomas Can (penalty scored); Mattias Candemir (penalty scored); Rabi Mourad (penalty scored); Andreas David (penalty scored); Marco Aydin (penalty scored); Jakob Sauma (penalty scored) | 7–6 | (penalty scored) Brice Martinez; (penalty scored) Ronald Rodas; (penalty scored) Vivian Dors; (penalty scored) Pierre Bru; (penalty scored) Nabil Moussi; (penalty scored) Nicolas Dubois; (penalty missed) Joel Congré |

Jämtkraft Arena, Östersund

4 June 2014
19:00

| Ellan Vannin (Isle of Man) | 1–1 | Kurdistan Region |
|---|---|---|
| Sharkey 80' | | Mushir 23' |
Penalties
| Ciaran McNulty (penalty scored); Calum Morrissey (penalty scored); Chris Bass Jr (penalty scored); Jack McVey (penalty scored) | 4–2 | (penalty missed) Khaled Mushir; (penalty missed) Sherzad Mohammed; (penalty scored) Younis Shakour; (penalty scored) Ahmed Salar |

Jämtkraft Arena, Östersund

==== Semi-finals ====
6 June 2014
16:00

| County of Nice | 3–0 | South Ossetia |
|---|---|---|
| Malik Tchokounte 3', 28'; Kevin Puyoo 83' |

Jämtkraft Arena, Östersund

6 June 2014
19:00

| Arameans Suryoye | 1–4 | (Isle of Man) Ellan Vannin |
|---|---|---|
| Mourad 9' | | Jones 23'; McVey 60'; Bass Jr. 70'; McNulty 72' |

Jämtkraft Arena, Östersund

==== Third-place play-off ====
8 June 2014
10:00

| South Ossetia | 1–4 | Arameans Suryoye |
|---|---|---|
| Siukaev 92' | | Kacho 9', 24', 73'; Percin 47' |

Jämtkraft Arena, Östersund

==== Final ====
8 June 2014
13:00

| County of Nice | 0–0 | (Isle of Man) Ellan Vannin |
|---|---|---|
| | Report |
Penalties
| Gilles Noto (penalty scored); Baptiste Delfino (penalty scored); Loic Malitini (penalty scored); Frank Delerue (penalty scored); Hichem Ferreri (penalty scored) | 5–3 | Ciaran McNulty (penalty scored); Calum Morrisey (penalty scored); Chris Bass (penalty missed); Jack McVey (penalty scored) |

Jämtkraft Arena, Östersund

ConIFA World Football Cup 2014 winners

County of Nice
First title

=== Placement round ===
| Placement round 1 | | Placement round 2 | | Placings | |
|---|---|---|---|---|---|
| 5 June – Östersund | | 7 June – Östersund | | 5th place | Padania |
| Tamil Eelam | 2 | Tamil Eelam | 10 | 6th place | Kurdistan Region |
| Sápmi | 4 | Darfur | 0 | 7th place | Occitania |
| 5 June – Östersund | | 7 June – Östersund | | 8th place | Abkhazia |
| Darfur | 0 | Sápmi | 1 | 9th place | Nagorno-Karabakh |
| Nagorno-Karabakh | 12 | Nagorno-Karabakh | 5 | 10th place | Sápmi |
| 5 June – Östersund | | 7 June – Östersund | | 11th place | Tamil Eelam |
| Padania | 3 (4) | Abkhazia | 0 | 12th place | Darfur |
| Abkhazia | 3 (2) | Occitania | 1 | | |
| 5 June – Östersund | | 7 June – Östersund | | | |
| Occitania | 2 (4) | Padania | 1 (4) | | |
| Kurdistan Region | 2 (5) | Kurdistan Region | 1 (3) | | |

==== Placement round 1 ====
5 June 2014
10:00

| Tamil Eelam | 2–4 | Sápmi |
|---|---|---|
| Ragvan 55', 77' | | Dreyer 58', 66' (??); 79' (o.g.) |

Jämtkraft Arena, Östersund

5 June 2014
13:00

| Darfur | 0–12 | Nagorno-Karabakh |
|---|---|---|
| | | Nranyan 7', 24', 45', 75'; Gyozalyan 22', 39', 54', 74'; Grigoryan 33', 42'; Karapetyan 69'; Bareghanyan 90+2' |

Jämtkraft Arena, Östersund

5 June 2014
16:00

| Padania | 3–3 | Abkhazia |
|---|---|---|
| Mosti 41'; Barwuah 48'; Prandelli 90+1' | | Vardania 60', 62'; Akhba 86' |
Penalties
| Andrea Rota (penalty scored); Luca Mosti (penalty scored); Stefano Tignonsini (penalty missed); Mauro Nannini (penalty scored); Andrea Mussi (penalty scored) | 4–2 | Ruslan Adzhindzhal (penalty scored); Alen Ardzheniya (penalty missed); Astamur Tarba (penalty missed); Aleksandr Khoklov (penalty scored) |

Jämtkraft Arena, Östersund

5 June 2014
19:00

| Occitania | 2–2 | Kurdistan Region |
|---|---|---|
| Dors 41', 47' | | Shakor 19'; Ahmed 76' |
Penalties
| Brice Martinez (penalty scored); Ronald Rodas (penalty scored); Vivian Dors (penalty scored); Pierre Bru (penalty missed); Nabil Moussi (penalty scored) | 4–5 | Younis Shakour (penalty scored); Nechirvan Shukri (penalty scored); Dozhgahr (penalty scored); Nechjrvan (penalty scored); Khaled Mushir (penalty scored) |

Jämtkraft Arena, Östersund

==== Placement round 2 ====
7 June 2014
10:00

| Tamil Eelam | 10–0 | Darfur |
|---|---|---|
| Navaneethakrishnan 2', 10'; Jeganthan 8'; Ragvan 16', 69', 69'; Balamurali 53'; Vigmeswararajah 73'; Gunasingham 81', 89' |

Jämtkraft Arena, Östersund

7 June 2014
13:00

| Sápmi | 1–5 | Nagorno-Karabakh |
|---|---|---|
| Ring 68' | | Poghosyan 30', 83'; Manasyan 32', 52'; Petrosyan 64' |

Jämtkraft Arena, Östersund

7 June 2014
16:00

| Abkhazia | 0–1 | Occitania |
|---|---|---|
| | | Hernandez 78' |

Jämtkraft Arena, Östersund

7 June 2014
19:00

| Padania | 1–1 | Kurdistan Region |
|---|---|---|
| Rota 64' | | Goal |
Penalties
| | 4–3 |

Jämtkraft Arena, Östersund

== Final Positions ==
| Pos | Team | Pld | W | D | L | GF | GA | GD | Pts | Result |
|---|---|---|---|---|---|---|---|---|---|---|
| 1 | County of Nice | 5 | 3 | 1 | 1 | 8 | 5 | +3 | 10 | |
| 2 | (Isle of Man) Ellan Vannin | 5 | 3 | 2 | 0 | 12 | 6 | +6 | 11 | |
| 3 | Arameans Suryoye | 5 | 3 | 1 | 1 | 9 | 6 | +3 | 10 | |
| 4 | South Ossetia | 5 | 1 | 1 | 3 | 21 | 10 | +11 | 4 | |
| 5 | Padania | 5 | 2 | 2 | 1 | 28 | 7 | +21 | 8 | Eliminated in the Quarterfinals |
| 6 | Kurdistan Region | 5 | 1 | 3 | 1 | 14 | 6 | +8 | 6 | Eliminated in the Quarterfinals |
| 7 | Occitania | 5 | 2 | 3 | 0 | 5 | 3 | +2 | 9 | Eliminated in the Quarterfinals |
| 8 | Abkhazia | 5 | 1 | 3 | 1 | 6 | 6 | 0 | 6 | Eliminated in the Quarterfinals |
| 9 | Nagorno-Karabakh | 4 | 2 | 0 | 2 | 19 | 5 | +14 | 6 | Eliminated in the First Stage |
| 10 | Sápmi | 4 | 1 | 0 | 3 | 6 | 10 | −4 | 3 | Eliminated in the First Stage |
| 11 | Tamil Eelam | 4 | 1 | 0 | 3 | 12 | 15 | −3 | 3 | Eliminated in the First Stage |
| 12 | Darfur | 4 | 0 | 0 | 4 | 0 | 61 | −61 | 0 | Eliminated in the First Stage |

== See also ==
- Viva World Cup
