= Artsakh national football team =

Unofficial national football team representing the Artsakh nation

Artsakh
2012–2019
- Association: Artsakh Football Association
- Confederation: ConIFA
- Head coach: Slavik Gabrielyan
- Home stadium: Stepanakert Republican Stadium, Stepanakert (formerly)
- FIFA code: NKR (not official)
First colours	Second colours

First international
- Abkhazia 1–1 Nagorno-Karabakh (Sukhumi, Abkhazia; 25 September 2012)

Last international
- Padania 0–2 Artsakh (Stepanakert, Artsakh; 8 June 2019)

Biggest win
- Nagorno-Karabakh 12–0 Darfur (Östersund, Sweden; 5 June 2014)

Biggest defeat
- Chameria 4–1 Artsakh (Martuni, Artsakh; 3 June 2019)

CONIFA World Football Cup
- Appearances: 1 (first in 2014)
- Best result: 9th

CONIFA European Football Cup
- Appearances: 1 (first in 2019)
- Best result: 5th

The Artsakh national football team (Armenian: Արցախի ֆուտբոլի հավաքական), until 2017 known as the Nagorno-Karabakh national football team, was the national representative of the Republic of Artsakh (Nagorno-Karabakh), which was internationally unrecognized. Consequently, it was not a member of FIFA or UEFA and was therefore not eligible to enter the FIFA World Cup or the UEFA European Championship.

== History ==
On 25 September 2012, they played their first competitive match away against Abkhazia getting a 1–1 tie. The following month they played the return match at home against Abkhazia, this time getting a 3–0 win for Artsakh. Their first competitive competition was the ConIFA World Football Cup which took place in Östersund, Sweden. The Association of Football Federations of Azerbaijan failed to stop their participating in the competition after contacting ConIFA. ConIFA refused to revoke their invitation and Artsakh finished 9th overall after losses to Ellan Vannin, Nice and wins against Darfur and Sapmi.

In 2019, Artsakh came back to CONIFA competitions by organising the 2019 CONIFA European Football Cup, where they finished in the fifth position.

In 2023, Artsakh were drawn in Group D of the 2024 CONIFA World Cup Qualification with Abkhazia. Their match was originally to be scheduled on 10 July 2023, but the match was delayed by CONIFA to a later date. It was eventually cancelled due to rising tensions between Armenia and Azerbaijan due to the blockade of Nagorno-Karabakh. On 19 September 2023, Azerbaijan launched a military offensive against Artsakh, the government surrendered and announced the dissolution of all government institutions by the end of 2023. However, that announcement was annulled just a few days before it was supposed to happen, and instead a government-in-exile was formed. As of 2024, it is unknown if the team will regroup again. However, Artsakh remains a listed member of CONIFA and was listed as an active member at the 2024 AGM.

== International record ==
=== At CONIFA World Football Cup ===
Year	Position	GP	W	D	L	GF	GA
(Sápmi) 2014	9th	4	2	0	2	19	5
(Abkhazia) 2016	did not participate						
(Ogaden) 2018	did not participate						
(Kurdistan Region) 2024	did not participate						
Total		4	2	0	2	19	5

=== At CONIFA European Football Cup ===
Year	Position	GP	W	D	L	GF	GA
(Székely Land) 2015	did not enter						
(Northern Cyprus) 2017	did not enter						
(Republic of Artsakh) 2019	5th	5	3	1	1	9	8
(County of Nice) 2021	cancelled						
(Northern Cyprus) 2023	did not enter						
Total		5	3	1	1	9	8

== Current squad ==
The following 23 players were called up to the squad for the 2019 CONIFA European Football Cup.

No.	Pos.	Player	Date of birth (age)	Caps	Goals	Club
1	GK	Erik Khachatryan	5 January 1998 (aged 21)			
2	FW	Marat Karapetyan	17 May 1991 (aged 28)			
3	DF	Artur Abrahamyan	2 May 1997 (aged 22)			
4	DF	Armen Abrahamyan	25 August 1997 (aged 21)			
5	DF	Gevorg Poghosyan	26 August 1986 (aged 32)			Free agent
6	DF	Aram Kostandyan	20 June 1989 (aged 29)			
7	MF	Gor Poghosyan	11 June 1988 (aged 30)			(Football Federation of Armenia) FC Ararat Yerevan
8	MF	Mher Mkrtumyan	3 July 1986 (aged 32)			
9	FW	Levon Grigoryan	23 September 1989 (aged 29)			
10	MF	Arsen Sargsyan	8 March 1983 (aged 36)			
11	FW	Karen Shakhkeldyan	8 November 1993 (aged 25)			Free agent
12	GK	Sergey Asryan	2 January 1993 (aged 26)			
13	MF	Tigran Hambardzumyan	2 April 1997 (aged 22)			
14	MF	Khoren Veranyan	4 September 1985 (aged 33)			(Football Federation of Armenia) Shirak SC
15	MF	Dmitri Malyaka	15 January 1990 (aged 29)			Free agent
16	DF	Orbeli Hambardzumyan	26 March 1996 (aged 23)			(Football Federation of Armenia) FC Ararat Yerevan
17	DF	Vadim Hayriyan	6 April 1997 (aged 22)			(Football Federation of Armenia) Artsakh FC
18	MF	Artyom Gevorkyan	21 May 1993 (aged 26)			(Football Federation of Armenia) Shirak SC
19	MF	Narek Danielyan	23 September 1990 (aged 28)			
20	FW	Norik Mkrtchyan	9 March 1997 (aged 22)			Free agent
21	DF	Davit Harutyunyan	14 December 1994 (aged 24)			Free agent
22	GK	Stepan Ghazaryan	11 January 1985 (aged 34)			(Football Federation of Armenia) FC Banants
23	FW	Davit Ghandilyan	4 June 1993 (aged 25)			(Football Federation of Armenia) Shirak SC

== Matches played ==
25 September 2012 Friendly	Abkhazia	1–1	Nagorno-Karabakh	(Abkhazia) Sukhumi
	Gublia 75'	Report	Barikyan 80'	Stadium: Republican Stadium; Referee: Serhiy Streletskyi (Ukraine)

21 October 2012 Friendly	Nagorno-Karabakh	3–0	Abkhazia	(Republic of Artsakh) Stepanakert
		Report		Stadium: Stepanakert Republican Stadium

1 June 2014 2014 ConIFA WC GS	Ellan Vannin (Isle of Man)	3–2	Nagorno-Karabakh	(Sápmi) Östersund
19:00	McNulty 41'; Antony Moore 88'; Frank Jones 90'		Manasyan 27', 31'	Stadium: Jämtkraft Arena

3 June 2014 2014 ConIFA WC GS	Nagorno-Karabakh	0–1	County of Nice	(Sápmi) Östersund
19:00			Sborgni 7'	Stadium: Jämtkraft Arena

5 June 2014 2014 ConIFA WC PR1	Darfur	0–12	Nagorno-Karabakh	(Sápmi) Östersund
13:00			Nranyan 7', 24', 45', 75'; Gyozalyan 22', 39', 54', 74'; Grigoryan 33', 42'; Karapetyan 69'; Bareghamyan 90+2'	Stadium: Jämtkraft Arena

7 June 2014 2014 ConIFA WC PR2	Sápmi	1–5	Nagorno-Karabakh	(Sápmi) Östersund
13:00	Ivar Ring 68'		Poghosyan 30', 83'; Manasyan 32', 52'; Petrosyan 64'	Stadium: Jämtkraft Arena

2 June 2019 2019 ConIFA EC GS	Artsakh	3–2	Sápmi	(Republic of Artsakh) Stepanakert
16:00	Mkrtchyan 3'; Sargsyan 43'; Malyaka 82'	Report	Zakrisson 24'; Edvardsen 83'	Stadium: Stepanakert Republican Stadium; Attendance: 12,000; Referee: Dmitrii Zhukov

4 June 2019 2019 ConIFA EC GS	Chameria	4–1	Artsakh	(Republic of Artsakh) Martuni
18:00	Çema 58', 90+3'; Mziu 85'; Gjoka 90+5'	Report	Sargsyan 83'	Stadium: Avakyan Arena; Attendance: 1,080; Referee: Ivan rkalj

4 June 2019 2019 ConIFA EC GS	Artsakh	1–1	Abkhazia	(Republic of Artsakh) Martuni
18:00	Mkrtchyan 33'	Report	Logua 8'	Stadium: Avakyan Arena; Attendance: 1,080; Referee: Dmitrii Zhukov

6 June 2019 2019 ConIFA EC PR1	Artsakh	2–1	Székely Land	(Republic of Artsakh) Martuni
17:00	Sargsyan 76' (pen.); Danielyan 90+4'	Report	Vékás 62'	Stadium: Avakyan Arena; Attendance: 1,080; Referee: Dmitrii Zhukov

8 June 2019 2019 ConIFA EC PR2	Padania	0–2	Artsakh	(Republic of Artsakh) Stepanakert
11:00			Sargsyan 58'; Malyaka 90+6'	Stadium: Stepanakert Republican Stadium; Attendance: 4,400; Referee: Ivan Mrkalj

== See also ==
- Republic of Artsakh
- Stepan Shahumyan Republican Stadium
