= 2017 CONIFA European Football Cup =

2017 ConIFA European Football Cup

Tournament details
- Host country: Northern Cyprus
- Dates: 4 June – 10 June
- Teams: 8
- Venue(s): 4 (in 4 host cities)

Final positions
- Champions: Padania
- Runners-up: Northern Cyprus
- Third place: Székely Land
- Fourth place: Abkhazia

Tournament statistics
- Matches played: 18
- Goals scored: 51 (2.83 per match)
- Top scorer(s): (Székely Land) Barna Bajko (5 goals)

The 2017 ConIFA European Football Cup was the second edition of the ConIFA European Football Cup, an international football tournament for states, minorities, stateless peoples and regions unaffiliated with FIFA organised by ConIFA. It was hosted in Northern Cyprus.

== Tournament ==
Following the 2015 ConIFA European Football Cup, the next tournament was announced to take place between 4–11 June 2017 in Northern Cyprus at the organization's Annual General Meeting in February 2017. A total of eight teams were announced as taking part in the tournament, planned to be held across four locations.

=== Hosts ===
Northern Cyprus

Nicosia	Kyrenia	Famagusta	Morphou
Lefkoşa Atatürk Stadı	Mete Adanır Stadyumu	Dr. Fazıl Küçük Stadı	Üner Berkalp Stadyumu
35.213611°N 33.337778°E	35.346948°N 33.26114124°E	35.1194332°N 33.9517383°E	35.2061244°N 32.9918883°E
Capacity: 28,000	Capacity: 1,500	Capacity: 7,000	Capacity: 7,000
2017 CONIFA European Football Cup is located in Cyprus

== Participants ==
A total of eight teams were announced as participating – both the current European Football Cup holders Padania and reigning World Football Cup champions Abkhazia were automatically qualified, with the remainder voted on by ConIFA members.

- Abkhazia
- Northern Cyprus
- Sápmi
- Occitania
- County of Nice
- Ellan Vannin
- Padania
- Székely Land

=== Withdrawals ===
Subsequent to the announcement of the eight participants, three then withdrew:

- Sapmi withdrew and were replaced by South Ossetia.
- County of Nice withdrew and were replaced by Felvidék.
- Occitania withdrew and were replaced by Kárpátalja.

== Matches ==
=== Group stage ===
The results of the group stage draw:

Key to colours in group tables
Teams that advanced to the semi-finals

==== Group A ====
Team	Pld	W	D	L	GF	GA	GD	Pts
Northern Cyprus (Q)	3	2	1	0	9	0	+9	7
Abkhazia (Q)	3	1	2	0	4	3	+1	5
Kárpátalja	3	1	1	1	6	4	+2	4
South Ossetia	3	0	0	3	2	14	−12	0

(Q) Qualified for the phase indicated
4 June 2017
20:00 EEST

Northern Cyprus	1–0	Kárpátalja
Yaşınses 89'

Atatürk Stadium, Nicosia
5 June 2017
20:00 EEST

Abkhazia	2–1	South Ossetia
Kortava 1'; Shoniya 90+1'		Kadjaev 61'

Mete Adanır Stadium, Kyrenia
6 June 2017
20:00 EEST

South Ossetia	0–8	Northern Cyprus
		Yaşınses 13'; Taşkıran 15', 20', 58'; Çıdamlı 57', 68'; Turan 62' (pen.); Gök 88'

Mete Adanır Stadium, Kyrenia
6 June 2017
20:00 EEST

Kárpátalja	2–2	Abkhazia
Szabó 33'; Roman 77'		Anatoli Semyonov 20', 50'

Atatürk Stadium, Nicosia
7 June 2017
20:00 EEST

South Ossetia	1–4	Kárpátalja
Kochiev 85'		Mile 20'; Baksa 33'; Barta 45+1'; Kész 62'

Dr. Fazıl Küçük Stadium, Famagusta
7 June 2017
20:00 EEST

Northern Cyprus	0–0	Abkhazia

Üner Berkalp Stadium, Morphou

==== Group B ====
Team	Pld	W	D	L	GF	GA	GD	Pts
Padania (Q)	3	2	1	0	4	1	+3	7
Székely Land (Q)	3	1	1	1	5	4	+1	4
Ellan Vannin	3	1	0	2	3	5	−2	3
Felvidék	3	1	0	2	1	3	−2	3

(Q) Qualified for the phase indicated
5 June 2017
20:00 EEST

Padania	1–0	Ellan Vannin
Rota 70'

Üner Berkalp Stadium, Morphou
5 June 2017
20:00 EEST

Felvidék	1–0	Székely Land
Križan 55'

Dr. Fazıl Küçük Stadium, Famagusta
6 June 2017
20:00 EEST

Székely Land	1–1	Padania
Szőcs 81'		Rota 8'

Dr. Fazıl Küçük Stadium, Famagusta
6 June 2017
20:00 EEST

Ellan Vannin	1–0	Felvidék
Bass 52'

Üner Berkalp Stadium, Morphou
7 June 2017
20:00 EEST

Ellan Vannin	2–4	Székely Land
McNultey 79', 86'		Bajkó 13', 36', 69' (pen.), 75'

Mete Adanır Stadium, Kyrenia
7 June 2017
20:00 EEST

Padania	2–0	Felvidék
Rota 62'; Rosset 90'

Atatürk Stadium, Nicosia

=== Knockout stage ===
==== Bracket ====
Semi-finals
9 June – Kyrenia
Padania	0 (6)
Abkhazia	0 (5)
9 June – Nicosia
Northern Cyprus	2
Székely Land	1

Final
10 June – Nicosia
Padania	1 (3)
Northern Cyprus	1 (2)
Third place
10 June – Kyrenia
Abkhazia	1
Székely Land	3

==== Placement round ====
9 June 2017
20:00 EEST

South Ossetia	0–2	Felvidék
		Molnár 5', 42'

Dr. Fazıl Küçük Stadium, Famagusta
9 June 2017
20:00 EEST

Kárpátalja	3–3	Ellan Vannin
Kelly 2' (o.g.); Fodor 30'; Kész 61'		Cown 23'; Cannell 61'; Doyle 83'
Penalties
	5–4

Üner Berkalp Stadium, Morphou

==== Semi-finals ====
9 June 2017
20:00 EEST

Northern Cyprus	2–1	Székely Land
Onet 16'; Turan 83'		Silion 49'

Atatürk Stadium, Nicosia
9 June 2017
20:00 EEST

Padania	0–0	Abkhazia
Penalties
	6–5

Mete Adanır Stadium, Kyrenia

==== Third-place play-off ====
10 June 2017
18:00 EEST

Székely Land	3–1	Abkhazia
Csürös 9'; Szőcs 24'; Bajkó 36'		Kortava 3'

Mete Adanır Stadium, Kyrenia

==== Final ====
10 June 2017
20:00 EEST

Padania	1–1	Northern Cyprus
Pllumbaj 23'		Turan 52'
Penalties
	4–2

Atatürk Stadium, Nicosia

== Final positions ==
Pos	Team	Pld	W	D	L	GF	GA	GD	Pts
1	Padania	5	2	3	0	5	2	+3	9
2	Northern Cyprus	5	3	2	0	12	2	+10	11
3	Székely Land	5	2	1	2	9	7	+2	7
4	Abkhazia	5	1	3	1	5	6	−1	6
5	Kárpátalja	4	1	2	1	9	7	+2	5
6	Ellan Vannin	4	1	1	2	6	8	−2	4
7	Felvidék	4	2	0	2	3	3	0	6
8	South Ossetia	4	0	0	4	2	16	−14	0

== Top scorers ==
5 goals

- (Székely Land) Barna Bajkó

3 goals

- (Northern Cyprus) Ertaç Taşkıran
- (Northern Cyprus) Halil Turan
- (Padania) Andrea Rota

2 goals

- (Abkhazia) Dmitri Kortava
- (Abkhazia) Anatoli Semyonov
- (Isle of Man) Ciaran McNultey
- (Upper Hungary) Attila Molnár
- (Kárpátalja) Tibor Kész
- (Székely Land) László Szőcs
- (Northern Cyprus) İbrahim Çıdamlı
- (Northern Cyprus) Mustafa Yaşınses

1 goal

- (Abkhazia) Ruslan Shoniya
- (Isle of Man) Chriss Bass, Jr
- (Isle of Man) Liam Cowin
- (Isle of Man) Chris Cannell
- (Isle of Man) Sean Doyle
- (Upper Hungary) Richard Križan
- (Kárpátalja) Ferenc Barta
- (Kárpátalja) Krisztián Mile
- (Kárpátalja) Roland Szabó
- (Kárpátalja) Ohar Roman
- (Kárpátalja) Zoltán Baksa
- (Kárpátalja) Norbert Fodor
- (Northern Cyprus) Uğur Gök
- (Northern Cyprus) Serhan Önet
- (Padania) Ersid Plumbaj
- (Padania) William Rosset
- (South Ossetia) Alan Kadjaev
- (South Ossetia) Solsan Kochiev
- (Székely Land) Attila Csürös
- (Székely Land) Petru Silion

Own goals

- (Isle of Man) Marc Kelly (in match Kárpátalja – Ellan Vannin)
