= County of Nice national football team =

Unofficial national football team representing the County of Nice

County of Nice
- Nickname(s): La Selecioun
- Association: Countea de Nissa Football Association
- Confederation: ConIFA
- Head coach: Frédéric Gioria
- Top scorer: Franck Delerue (8)
First colours	Second colours

First international
- Ellan Vannin 4–2 County of Nice (Östersund, Sweden; 2 June 2014)

Biggest win
- County of Nice 3–0 South Ossetia (Östersund, Sweden; 6 June 2014); Felvidék 1–4 County of Nice (Debrecen, Hungary; 19 June 2015)

Biggest defeat
- Padania 4–1 County of Nice (Debrecen, Hungary; 21 June 2015)

ConIFA World Football Cup
- Appearances: 1 (first in 2014)
- Best result: Champion 2014

CONIFA European Football Cup
- Appearances: 1 (first in 2015)
- Best result: Runners-up 2015

The County of Nice Football Team is a football team that represents the County of Nice. It is organized by the Countea de Nissa Football Association, established in April 2014. They are not affiliated with FIFA or UEFA, and therefore cannot compete for the FIFA World Cup or the UEFA European Championship.

The County of Nice Football Team won the 2014 ConIFA World Football Cup in Östersund, Sweden.

== Tournament records ==
=== ConIFA World Football Cup record ===
Year	Position	GP	W	D	L	GS	GA	GD
(Sápmi) 2014	Champion	5	4	0	1	8	5	+3
(Abkhazia) 2016	Withdrew							
(England) 2018	did not enter							
(North Macedonia) 2020	did not enter							
Total		5	4	0	1	8	5	+3

=== ConIFA European Football Cup record ===
Year	Position	GP	W	D	L	GS	GA	GD
(Székely Land) 2015	Runners-up	4	3	0	1	11	8	+3
(Northern Cyprus) 2017	Withdrew							
(Republic of Artsakh) 2019	Withdrew							
(County of Nice) 2021	Withdrew							
(Northern Cyprus) 2023	Did not enter							
Total		4	3	0	1	11	8	+3

== International record ==
Date	Location	Venue	Competition	Opponent	Score ^{(1)}
29 May 2019	Grasse, France		Friendly	(France) RC Grasse	1–3
28 March 2019	Nice, France	Allianz Riviera	Friendly	(France) OGC Nice II	2–2
17 June 2017	Nice, France	Allianz Riviera	Friendly	(France) AS Cannes	2–0
21 June 2015	Debrecen, Hungary		2015 ConIFA European Football Cup – Final	Padania	1–4
20 June 2015	Debrecen, Hungary		2015 ConIFA European Football Cup – Semi-final	Ellan Vannin	3–1
19 June 2015	Debrecen, Hungary		2015 ConIFA European Football Cup – Group Stage	Felvidék	4–1
17 June 2015	Debrecen, Hungary		2015 ConIFA European Football Cup – Group Stage	Székely Land	3–2
25 May 2015	Nice, France	Stade des Francs-Archers	Friendly	(Monaco) Challenge Prince Rainier III	4–2
8 June 2014	Östersund, Sweden	Jämtkraft Arena	2014 ConIFA World Football Cup – Final	Ellan Vannin	0–0 (5–3 p)
6 June 2014	Östersund, Sweden	Jämtkraft Arena	2014 ConIFA World Football Cup – Semi-final	South Ossetia	3–0
4 June 2014	Östersund, Sweden	Jämtkraft Arena	2014 ConIFA World Football Cup – Quarter-final	Padania	2–1
3 June 2014	Östersund, Sweden	Jämtkraft Arena	2014 ConIFA World Football Cup – Group stage	Artsakh	1–0
2 June 2014	Östersund, Sweden	Jämtkraft Arena	2014 ConIFA World Football Cup – Group stage	Ellan Vannin	2–4
^{(1)}In the Score column, County of Nice's score is shown first.

== Managers ==
Manager	Period	Played	Won	Drawn	Lost	Win %
(France) Jean-Philippe Mattio/Frédéric Gioria	2014–2019	13	8	2	3	61.5
Totals		13	8	2	3	61.53

== Honours ==
=== Non-FIFA competitions ===
- CONIFA World Football Cup
  - Champions (1): 2014
- CONIFA European Football Cup
  - Runners-up (1): 2015
