= Marco Aydin =

Dutch footballer (born 1988)

Marco Aydin (born 27 September 1988) is a Dutch footballer who plays as a midfielder for CVV Achilles.

== Early life ==
Aydin was born in 1988 in Enschede, Netherlands, to Assyrian parents from southeastern Turkey. He attended sports university in Zwolle.

== Club career ==
After leaving Dutch side Quick '20 due to a conflict with the manager, Aydin signed for Dutch side SC Enschede, where he was regraded as one of the clun's most important players. He trialed at Dutch side Sparta on the recommendation of Dutch manager Theo Vonk. After that, he signed for Dutch side Excelsior '31, but he eventually did not receive confidence from the club's management, so he decided to move to Germany.

== International career ==
Aydin played for the Arameans Suryoye football team at the 2014 ConIFA World Football Cup, helping the team achieve third place.

== Post-playing career ==
Aydin has worked as a youth community organizer, physical education teacher, and as the chairman of Dutch side Zaalvoetbalclub Twente.

== Managerial career ==
In 2020, Aydin was appointed player-manager of German side Vorwärts Epe, where he was regarded to have helped the club achieve good results during his first season. In 2021, his contract with them was extended. After that, he was appointed manager of German side DJK Stadtlohn, where the club was regarded to have struggled defensively during his first season.

== Personal life ==
Aydin is the brother of Dutch footballer Lucas Aydin. He is a supporter of Dutch side Ajax.
