= Malik Tchokounté =

French footballer (born 1988)

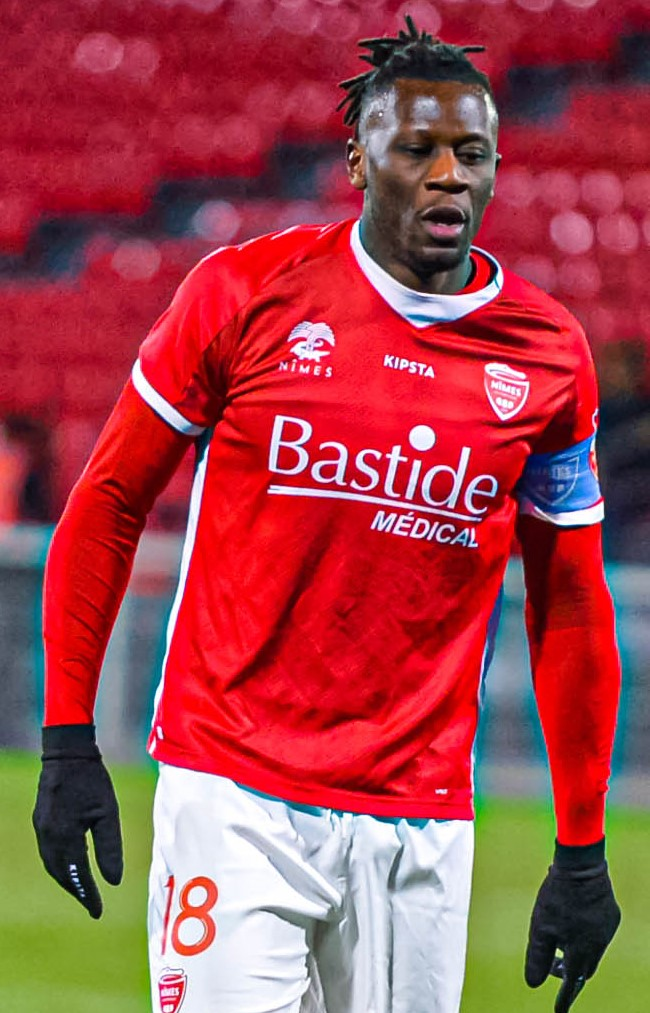
- Tchokounté in 2023

Personal information
- Date of birth: 11 September 1988 (age 38)
- Place of birth: Nice, France
- Height: 1.91 m (6 ft 3 in)
- Position: Forward

Team information
- Current team: Rouen
- Number: 9

Youth career
- 1992–2008: Nice

Senior career*
Years	Team	Apps	(Gls)
2008–2009	Thurrock		
2009–2013	Calvi	118	(48)
2013–2017	Dunkerque	92	(28)
2017–2018	Paris FC	36	(12)
2018–2020	Caen	46	(4)
2020–2022	Dunkerque	65	(18)
2022–2023	Nîmes	38	(13)
2023–2026	Laval	95	(20)
2026–	Rouen	0	(0)

International career
2014–	County of Nice	9	(5)
Medal record
Representing County of Nice
ConIFA World Football Cup
Winner	2014 Sapmi
- * Club domestic league appearances and goals as of 12 May 2026

Malik Tchokounté (born 11 September 1988) is a French professional footballer who plays as a forward for Ligue 3 club Rouen.

== Club career ==
A youth product of OGC Nice, Tchokounté was a prolific scorer in the lower divisions of France, before transferring to Paris FC in the Ligue 2 on 4 July 2017. He made his professional debut with Paris FC in a 0–0 Ligue 2 tie with Clermont Foot on 28 July 2017.

On 10 July 2018, Tchokounté joined Stade Malherbe Caen in Ligue 1.

In June 2022, Tchokounté joined Nîmes on a one-year contract.

== International career ==
Tchokounté appeared for the County of Nice national football team at the 2014 ConIFA World Football Cup, and helped them win the tournament for the first time.

== Personal life ==
Tchokounté is of Cameroonian and Guinean descent.
