= Seamus Sharkey =

Manx footballer

Personal information
- Date of birth: 11 May 1990 (age 36)
- Place of birth: Laxey, Isle of Man
- Height: 1.79 m (5 ft 10 in)
- Position: Defender

Youth career
- –2007: Derry City

Senior career*
Years	Team	Apps	(Gls)
2007–2010	Derry City	5	(1)
2009	→ Finn Harps (loan)	10	(0)
2011	Southern Cross United		
2011	Lisburn Distillery	1	(0)
2014	Rochester Lancers (indoor)	3	(0)
2015	Derry City	11	(0)
2016	Limerick	5	(0)
2017–2018	Sligo Rovers	33	(1)
2019–2020	Glenavon	18	(1)
2020–2023	Institute		

International career
- Ellan Vannin
- * Club domestic league appearances and goals as of 17 September 2025

Seamus Sharkey (born 11 May 1990) is a Manx former professional footballer who played as a defender.

== Career ==
=== Club career ===
Sharkey started his career with League of Ireland First Division side Derry City, helping them earn promotion to the League of Ireland Premier Division. Before the 2011 season, he signed for Southern Cross United in Australia, where he played for a few months until returning home and signing for Lisburn Distillery for a brief period. In 2014, he signed for Rochester Lancers in the United States. Before the 2015 season, Sharkey returned to League of Ireland Premier Division club Derry City. Before the 2016 season, he signed for Limerick in the League of Ireland First Division.

Before the 2017 season, he returned to the League of Ireland Premier Division, signing for Sligo Rovers. Before the second half of 2018–19, Sharkey signed for Glenavon in the NIFL Premiership, helping them win the 2019 Mid-Ulster Cup. In 2020, he signed for NIFL Championship club Institute.

=== International career ===
He represented Ellan Vannin at the 2014 ConIFA World Football Cup but missed the 2018 ConIFA World Football Cup.
