= Musa Karli =

German footballer

Personal information
- Date of birth: January 27, 1990 (age 36)
- Place of birth: Delmenhorst, West Germany
- Height: 1.87 m (6 ft 2 in)
- Position: Attacking midfielder

Youth career
- Atlas Delmenhorst
- TuR Abdin
- TuS Heidkrug
- –2007: Werder Bremen
- 2007–2009: VfL Osnabrück

Senior career*
Years	Team	Apps	(Gls)
2009–2012	SV Wilhelmshaven	92	(10)
2012–2013	Darmstadt 98	4	(0)
2013–2014	VfB Oldenburg	7	(0)
2014–2021	Atlas Delmenhorst		

International career
	Arameans Suryoye	4	(2)
- * Club domestic league appearances and goals as of December 22, 2012

Musa Karli (born January 27, 1990) is a German footballer who most recently played for Atlas Delmenhorst. At international level, he has represented the Arameans Suryoye football team. He previously played in the 3. Liga for Darmstadt 98.
