= Franconia football team =

Unofficial national football team representing the region of Franconia

Franconia
- Nickname: Franken-Elf (Franken 11)
- Association: Franconian Football Association
- Confederation: ConIFA
- Head coach: Rudi Schiebel
- Home stadium: Lohr am Main
First colours

First international
- Franconia 4–2 Raetia (Lohr am Main; 29 May 2014)

Biggest win
- Franconia 4–2 Raetia (Lohr am Main; 29 May 2014)

Biggest defeat
- Raetia 6–0 Franconia (Chur; 6 September 2015)

CONIFA European Football Cup
- Appearances: 0

The Franconia football team, also called Franken 11, is a team representing the people of Franconia, located in south-central Germany.

== History ==
The team was founded in 2014 by Rudi Schiebel. They played their first game against Raetia on 29 May 2014; this game was opposed by the Bavarian Football Association as it claimed to be exclusively responsible for organizing any "selected teams".

They entered the 2015 ConIFA European Football Cup but later withdrew. Franconia also took part in the 2016 ConIFA World Football Cup qualification but failed to make it through to the finals.
