= Jean-Philippe Mattio =

French footballer (born 1965)

Personal information
- Date of birth: 24 February 1965 (age 61)
- Place of birth: Nice
- Position: Defender

Senior career*
Years	Team	Apps	(Gls)
1981–1998	OGC Nice		
1998–1999	US Cagnes		
- * Club domestic league appearances and goals

Jean-Philippe Mattio (born 24 February 1965) is a retired French football defender.

== Career ==
Mattio started his career with OGC Nice.
