= Panushanth Kulenthiran =

Italian footballer

Personal information
- Full name: Panushanth Kulenthiran
- Date of birth: 26 July 1990 (age 36)
- Place of birth: Palermo, Italy
- Position: Striker

Youth career
- 2007–2008: Palermo

Senior career*
Years	Team	Apps	(Gls)
2008–2009	Palermo	0	(0)
2008–2009	→ Vibonese (loan)	22	(0)
2009–2010	AC Bellinzona	0	(0)
2010–2011	→ Roma (loan)	0	(0)
2011–2012	→ AC Bellinzona		
2012	→ Monreale Calcio		
2015–2018	Real Milano		
2018–20??	Senna Gloria		

International career
2013–201?	Tamil Eelam	10	(8)
- * Club domestic league appearances and goals

Panushanth Kulenthiran (born 26 July 1990) is an Italian professional footballer who plays as a striker for Italian side Senna Gloria and the Tamil Eelam national team.

== Career ==
Born in Italy to parents from the Sri Lankan city of Jaffna, Kulenthiran began his career in the youth side for Palermo. In the 2008–09 season, he made 22 appearances on loan at Vibonese.

After two years with Palermo signed in summer 2009 for Swiss side AC Bellinzona. On 1 February 2010, A.S. Roma signed the Tamil forward on loan from Bellinzona. He returned Switzerland for the 2011–12 season and, in summer 2012, he moved to Italian team A.S.D. Monreale Calcio, based in Monreale. On 17 December 2012 he leaves Monreale Calcio ad free agents.

In 2015 he Eccellenza side Real Milano.
