= Franck Delerue =

French association footballer (born 1989)

Personal information
- Date of birth: 1 March 1989 (age 37)
- Place of birth: Nice, France
- Height: 1.80 m (5 ft 11 in)
- Position: Striker

Team information
- Current team: Villefranche Saint-Jean Beaulieu

Senior career*
Years	Team	Apps	(Gls)
–2012	US Cap d'Ail		
2012–2013	Cannes	16	(3)
2013–2014	Hyères	22	(5)
2014–2015	FC Balagne	26	(3)
2015–2017	Cannet Rocheville	49	(19)
2018–2022	RC Grasse	81	(13)
2022–	Villefranche Saint-Jean Beaulieu		
- * Club domestic league appearances and goals

Franck Delerue (born 1 March 1989) is a French footballer who plays as a striker for Villefranche Saint-Jean Beaulieu.

== Early life ==
Delerue was born in 1989 in Nice, France.

== Club career ==
Delerue started his career with French side US Cap d'Ail. In 2012, Delerue signed his first professional contract with French side Cannes, helping the club achieve second place. In 2013, he signed for French side Hyères. After that, he sighed for French side Cannet Rocheville. In 2018, he signed for French side RC Grasse, where he was regarded as one of the club's most important players.

== International career ==
Delerue played for the County of Nice national football team, helping the team win the 2014 ConIFA World Football Cup. He was the top scorer of the 2015 CONIFA European Football Cup with five goals.

== Style of play ==
Delerue mainly operates as a striker or right-winger.

== Personal life ==
Delerue has a son named Lenny. He is a supporter of French Ligue 1 side Nice.
