= Frédéric Gioria =

French footballer (born 1969)

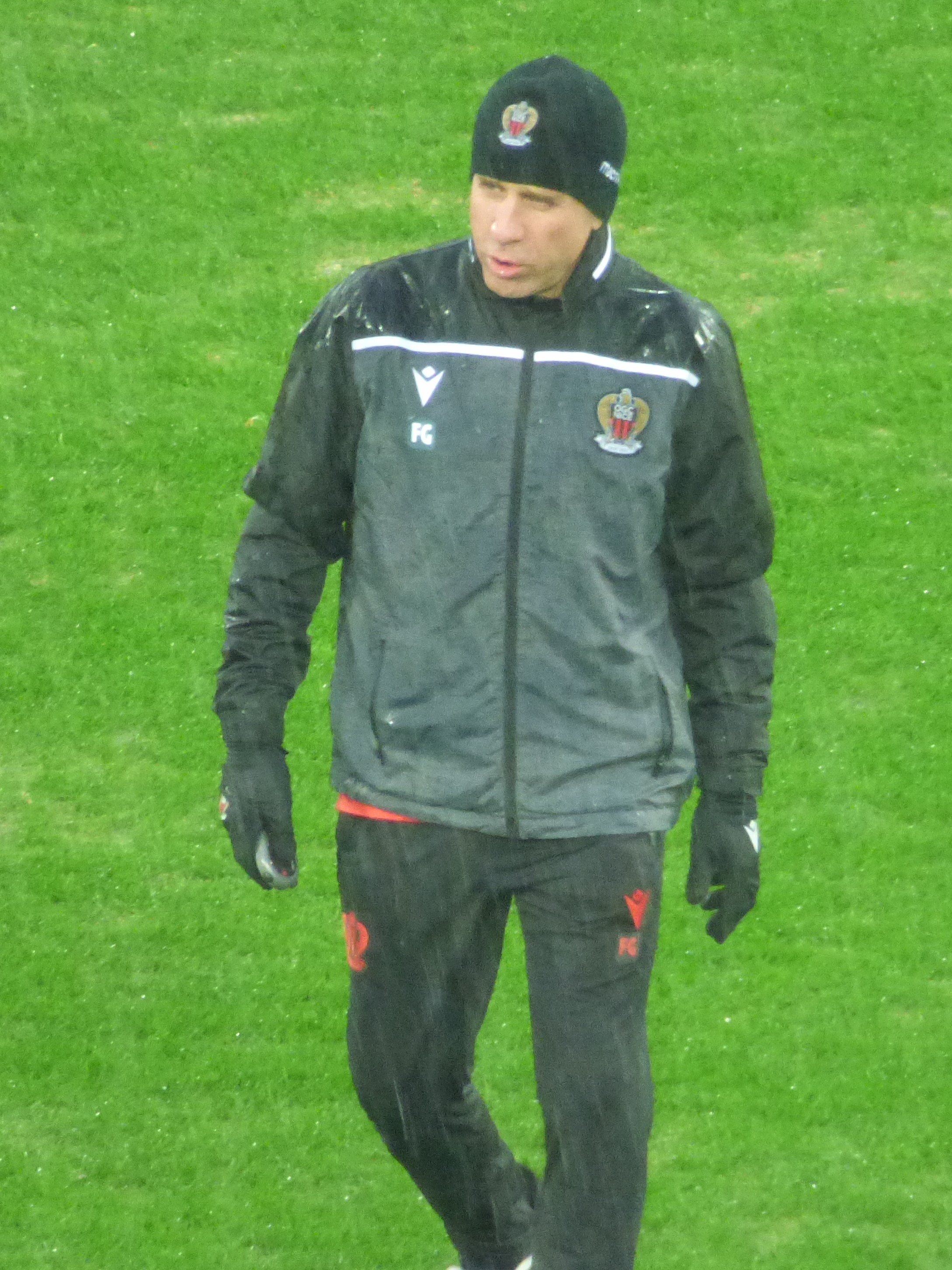
- Gioria in 2021

Personal information
- Date of birth: 2 September 1969 (age 57)
- Place of birth: Nice, France
- Height: 1.75 m (5 ft 9 in)
- Position: Midfielder

Youth career
- 1979–1986: Nice

Senior career*
Years	Team	Apps	(Gls)
1986–1988	Nice II	1	(0giovanolo)
1988–2000	Nice	216	(4)

Managerial career
- 2012–2022: Nice (assistant)
- * Club domestic league appearances and goals

Frédéric Gioria (born 2 September 1969) is a French football coach and former player.

== Career ==
A youth product of his native club Nice since the age of 10, Gioria began his professional career with the club in 1988. A midfielder, he went on to captain the side, and led them when they won the 1997 Coupe de France Final. He retired from professional football in 2000 after a recurring knee injury.

After retirement, he returned to Nice as a physical trainer, then managed the reserves. In 2012, he was named assistant manager by Claude Puel, and has stayed in that post since.

== See also ==
- List of one-club men in association football

== Honours ==
Nice

- Coupe de France: 1997
