= Barna Bajkó =

Romanian association footballer

Barna Bajkó (born 16 May 1984) is a Romanian former footballer who last played as a striker for FK Csíkszereda.

== Early life ==
Bajkó was born in 1984 in Miercurea Ciuc (Hungarian: Csíkszereda), Romania and was described as a "fan favorite... highly respected by spectators and professionals in every Transylvanian city.".

== Club career ==
Bajkó played in the Romanian top flight Liga I with Romanian side Gloria, where he suffered an injury, before finishing his career solely playing for clubs in the Transylvania region. In 2009, Bajkó signed for Romanian side CSM Deva. In 2010, he signed for Romanian side FK Csíkszereda. He was regarded as an important player for the club, helping the club earn promotion and achieve good runs the Romanian Cup. He captained the club. He retired from professional football in 2020.

== International career ==
Bajkó played for the Székely Land football team, including at the CONIFA World Football Cup.

== Style of play ==
Bajkó mainly operated as a striker and was known for his penalty kick taking ability.

== Managerial career ==
Bajkó has worked as a youth manager of the youth academy of Romanian side FK Csíkszereda, helping the club win the league.

== Personal life ==
While playing football, Bajkó also worked as a referee. He has been married and has children.
