= Artur Yelbayev =

Russian footballer

Personal information
- Full name: Artur Sergeyevich Yelbayev
- Date of birth: 5 November 1988 (age 37)
- Height: 1.72 m (5 ft 8 in)
- Position: Forward

Senior career*
| Years | Team | Apps | (Gls) |
| 2007–2009 | FC Avtodor Vladikavkaz | 56 | (20) |
| 2009–2010 | FC Gubkin | 9 | (0) |
| 2010–2011 | FC FAYUR Beslan | 22 | (4) |
| 2011 | FC Tekstilshchik Ivanovo | 7 | (0) |
| 2012 | FC FAYUR Beslan | 20 | (8) |
| 2012 | FC Biolog-Novokubansk Progress | 17 | (1) |
| 2013–2014 | FC Digora (amateur) | | |
| 2014–2015 | FC Alania Vladikavkaz | 7 | (1) |
| 2015–2018 | FC Digora (amateur) | | |

International career
| | South Ossetia | 5 | (9) |
- * Club domestic league appearances and goals

Artur Sergeyevich Yelbayev (Russian: Артур Серге́евич Елбаев; born 5 November 1988) is a Russian former professional football player.

== Honours ==
- Top goal scorer: 2011–12 Russian Cup
