= László Szőcs =

Romanian futsal player

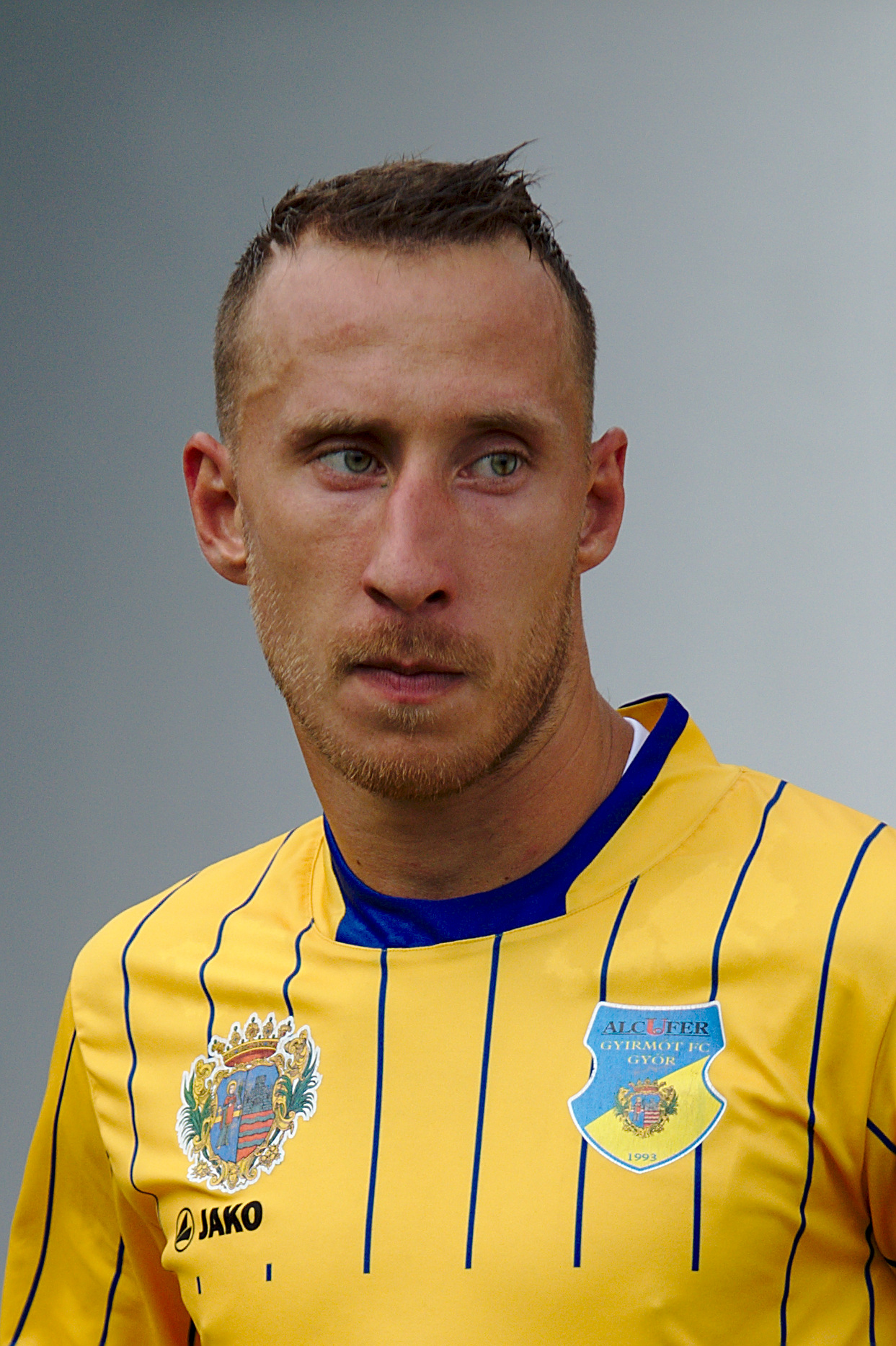

Personal information
- Full name: László Szőcs
- Date of birth: 10 October 1984 (age 42)
- Place of birth: Romania
- Height: 1.73 m (5 ft 8 in)
- Position: Winger

Team information
- Current team: Futsal Klub Székelyudvarhely
- Number: 10

Senior career*
Years	Team	Apps	(Gls)
- Sportklub Székelyudvarhely
- AS City'us Târgu Mureș

International career
	Romania (futsal)		(51)
	Székely Land (football)	10	(7)
- * Club domestic league appearances and goals

László Szőcs (born 10 October 1984) is a Romanian futsal player of Hungarian ethnicity, who plays for Futsal Klub Székelyudvarhely and the Romanian national futsal team.
