= Arameans Suryoye football team =

National association football team

Arameans Suryoye
- Association: Arameans Suryoye Football Association
- Confederation: ConIFA
- Head coach: Melke Alan
First colours

First international
- Arameans Suryoye 1–0 Sápmi (Gällivare, Sweden; 9 July, 2008)

Biggest win
- Arameans Suryoye 5–0 Provence (Malmberget, Sweden; 10 July, 2008)

Biggest defeat
- Arameans Suryoye 1–4 Padania (Malmberget, Sweden; 12 July, 2008)

ConIFA World Football Cup
- Appearances: 1 (first in 2014 ConIFA World Football Cup)
- Best result: 3rd (2014)

The Arameans Suryoye football team is the representative football team for Arameans worldwide. They are not affiliated with FIFA or Asian Football Confederation, and therefore cannot compete for the FIFA World Cup or Asian Cup. The team played in the 2008 VIVA World Cup reaching the final which they lost 2–0 to Padania. The team played in the CONIFA World Football Cup 2014 in Östersund, Sweden, and won bronze medal in the game against South Ossetia with 1–4.

== Competitive Record ==
=== World Cup ===
Year	Round	Position	P	W	D	L	GS	GA
Viva World Cup
(Occitania) 2006	did not enter							
(Sápmi) 2008	Runners-up	2nd	5	2	1	2	7	6
(Padania) 2009	did not enter							
(Gozo) 2010	did not enter							
(Kurdistan Region) 2012	did not enter							
ConIFA World Football Cup
(Sápmi) 2014	Third Place	3rd	5	3	1	1	9	6
(Abkhazia) 2016	did not qualify							
(Barawa) 2018	did not qualify							
(Kurdistan Region) 2024	did not qualify							
Total	2/6	0 Titles	10	5	2	3	16	12

== Selected internationals ==
Date	Venue	Opponent	Score
9 July 2008	2008 VIVA World Cup – Sápmi	Sápmi	1–0
10 July 2008	2008 VIVA World Cup – Sápmi	Provence	5–0
11 July 2008	2008 VIVA World Cup – Sápmi	Kurdistan Region	0–0
12 July 2008	2008 VIVA World Cup – Sápmi	Padania	1–4
13 July 2008	2008 VIVA World Cup – Sápmi	Padania	0–2
1 June 2014	2014 ConIFA World Football Cup – Sápmi	Kurdistan Region	2–1
2 June 2014	2014 ConIFA World Football Cup – Sápmi	Tamil Eelam	2–0
4 June 2014	2014 ConIFA World Football Cup – Sápmi	Occitania	0–0
6 June 2014	2014 ConIFA World Football Cup – Sápmi	Ellan Vannin	1–4
8 June 2014	2014 ConIFA World Football Cup – Sápmi	South Ossetia	4–1

== Managers ==
Manager	Period	Played	Won	Drawn	Lost	Win %
(Sweden) Melke Alan	2008–2014	10	5	2	3	50
Totals		10	5	2	3	50

== Honours ==
=== Non-FIFA competitions ===
- Viva World Cup
  - Runners-up (1): 2008
- CONIFA World Football Cup
  - Third place (1): 2014
