= Frank Jones (footballer) =

Welsh footballer

Personal information
- Full name: Frank Jones
- Date of birth: 3 October 1960 (age 66)
- Place of birth: Llandudno, Wales
- Height: 5 ft 11 in (1.80 m)
- Position: Defender

Youth career
- Wrexham

Senior career*
Years	Team	Apps	(Gls)
1978–1981	Wrexham	8	(0)
1981–1982	Oswestry Town		
1982–1983	Bangor City		
1983–1984	Conwy United		
1985–1986	Wrexham	31	(0)
1987–1989	Rhyl		
1990–1991	Conwy United		
1991–1996	Llandudno		

International career
	Wales U21	1	(0)
- * Club domestic league appearances and goals

Frank Jones (born 3 October 1960) is a Welsh former footballer who played as a defender. Mostly playing in the Welsh football league, he made appearances in the English football league with Wrexham.

== Career ==
A product of Wrexham's youth system, Jones turned professional in 1978, making 8 appearances in his first spell at the club.

Jones would leave in 1981, having spells at Oswestry Town, Bangor City and Conwy United before returning to Wrexham in 1985.

He would only stay one season, before he would move back into the Welsh football league with Rhyl, before returning to Conwy United and ending his career at home-town club Llandudno.

During his career, Jones won a cap for the Wales Under-21 team.
