= Üner Berkalp Stadium =

Coordinates: 35°12′22″N 32°59′41″E

Zafer Stadı is a multi-purpose stadium in Guzelyurt, Northern Cyprus. It is currently used mostly for football matches and hosted some matches for 2006 ELF Cup. The stadium holds 7,000 people. It is the home of the football clubs Baf Ülkü Yurdu S.K. and Binatlı Yılmaz S.K. and is the original home ground of Digenis Akritas Morphou.

The stadium is owned by Morphou Municipality of the Republic of Cyprus but because of the 1974 Turkish invasion of Cyprus, the stadium and the town of Morphou are illegally occupied. According to the Cypriot Government the official name of the stadium is Morphou Municipal Stadium.
