= Romani people official football team =

Unofficial national football team representing the Romani people

Romani people
- Association: Federación Romaní de fútbol
- Head coach: Andrea Luigi Mazza
- Top scorer: J. Oivido; I. Irhas. Horvath (2 goals each)

First international
- Southern Cameroons 1–3 Romani people (Montreuil, France; 9 June 2007)

Biggest win
- Southern Cameroons 1–3 Romani people (Montreuil, France; 9 June 2007); Székely Land 2–4 Romani people (Debrecen, Hungary; 19 June 2015)

Biggest defeat
- Ellan Vannin 3–1 Romani people (Debrecen, Hungary; 17 June 2015); Padania 2–0 Romani people (Milan, Italy; 16 May 2016)

ConIFA European Football Cup
- Appearances: 1 (first in 2015)
- Best result: 5th (2015)

The Romani people official football team is a national football team representing the Romani people.

== Affiliation ==
It is not affiliated to any FIFA confederation, so it cannot play in any of their tournaments. It was, however, affiliated to ConIFA, and play in the ConIFA European Football Cup.

== History ==
They played in the 2015 edition, where they finished 5th out of 6, above the hosts Székely Land. They showed good form and skill, and they narrowly lost to Ellan Vannin and Padania. Since January 2016 the third football team of Milan – Brera Calcio –, whose chairman is Alessandro Aleotti, is managing the Romani People national team as a tool to fight the ongoing discrimination of the Romani People across Europe.

Brera Calcio is launching a new project which aims to use football as a way for changing the perception and growing the awareness of Romani People. The football club is working in collaboration with the international activist Dijana Pavlovic, a Romani actress with a Serbian passport living in Milan. Staff at Brera Calcio is selecting the players from this certain ethnicity in 18 European countries, who will proudly wear the T-shirts of “National” being the largest ethnic minority in Europe. The team is coached by Brera Calcio coach Andrea Mazza and they were due to compete at the 2016 ConIFA World Football Cup, but later withdrew.

== International matches ==
Date	Location	Venue	Competition	Opponent	Score ^{(1)}
9 June 2007	Montreuil, France	Unknown	Friendly	Southern Cameroons	3–1
17 June 2015	Debrecen, Hungary	Stadion Oláh Gábor Út	2015 ConIFA European Football Cup – Group Stage	Padania	2–3
18 June 2015	Debrecen, Hungary	Stadion Oláh Gábor Út	2015 ConIFA European Football Cup – Group Stage	Ellan Vannin	1–3
19 June 2015	Debrecen, Hungary	Stadion Oláh Gábor Út	2015 ConIFA European Football Cup – 5th/6th place game	Székely Land	4–2
^{(1)}In the Score column, the Romani People's score is shown first.
