= Felvidék football team =

Unofficial national football team representing the region of Felvidèk

Felvidék
- Association: Felvidéki Labdarúgó Egyesület
- Confederation: ConIFA
First colours

First international
- Alderney 1–2 Felvidék (Douglas, Isle of Man; 30 May 2015)

Biggest win
- Felvidék 3–1 Székely Land (Debrecen, Hungary; 18 June 2015)

Biggest defeat
- Padania 5–0 Felvidék (Debrecen, Hungary; 20 June 2015)

ConIFA European Football Cup
- Appearances: 2 (first in 2015)
- Best result: 4th (2015)

The Felvidék football team (Hungarian: [ˈfɛlvideːk]) is a team representing the Hungarian minority in Southern Slovakia. Felvidék is the Hungarian word for “highlands” and the region usually referred to as Felvidék makes up nearly 10% of the territory of modern Slovakia. It is a member of ConIFA, an umbrella association for states, minorities, stateless peoples and regions unaffiliated with FIFA.

The team participated in the 2015 ConIFA European Football Cup and 2017 ConIFA European Football Cup finishing 4th and 7th overall respectively.

== Felvidéki Labdarúgó Egyesület ==
The Felvidéki Labdarúgó Egyesület is the football association of Felvidék.

== See also ==
- Kárpátalja football team
- Székely Land football team
