= Jämtkraft Arena =

Sports venue in Östersund, Sweden

Östersund Arena
- Jämtkraft Arena
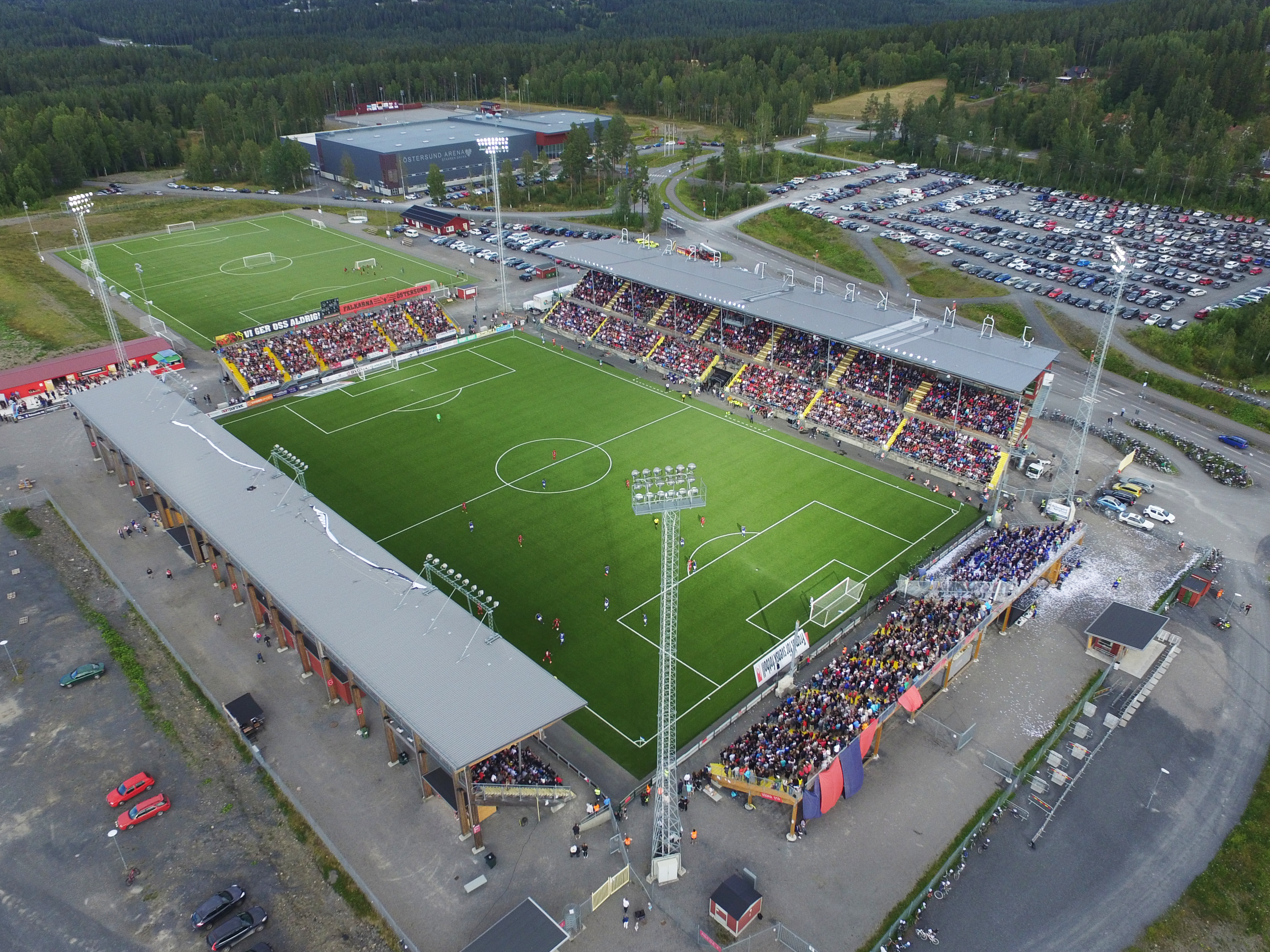
- Jämtkraft Arena
- Interactive map of Östersund Arena
- Address: Arenavägen 23, Östersund
- Location: Östersund, Sweden
- Coordinates: 63.19458°N 14.65692°E
- Owner: Östersund Municipality
- Capacity: 8,466
- Surface: Plastic turf
- Public transit: Local bus

Construction
- Opened: 13 July 2007

Tenants
- Östersunds FK, Östersunds DFF

Östersund Arena, currently known as Jämtkraft Arena for sponsorship reasons, is a football stadium in Östersund, Sweden. Its current capacity is 8,466 and it was opened on 13 July 2007.

The official tenants are Östersunds FK and Östersunds DFF, but many other football clubs in the area regularly play there.

One of its most famous visitors was Arsenal Football Club. On February 15, 2018, they defeated Östersunds FK by 3-0 in the first-leg of the Europa League's Round of 32.
