= Sports in Somaliland =

Sports are popular in Somaliland from both the participation and spectating aspect. The most popular sport in Somaliland is football; other popular sports include track and field and basketball. Sporting events in Somaliland are organised by the Somaliland's Ministry of Youth and Sports. Somaliland hosts the Somaliland Regional Games, a multi-sport event every two or four years. The participants of this event are the athletes from all regions of Somaliland.

The Somaliland national football team has a FIFA application for membership pending recognition and would join Confederation of African Football and CECAFA in African competitive football, Somaliland has participated in the CONIFA World Football Cup. Somaliland would likely join International Olympic Committee pending recognition as a sovereign country, Basketball is also a keen sport in Somaliland with Men's and Women's Teams and Leagues.

== See also ==
- Somaliland Football Association
- Somaliland Regional Games
- Somaliland national football team
- Ministry of Youth and Sports
- Hassan Mohamed Abdulle
