= Somaliland Football Association =

Football governing body in Somaliland

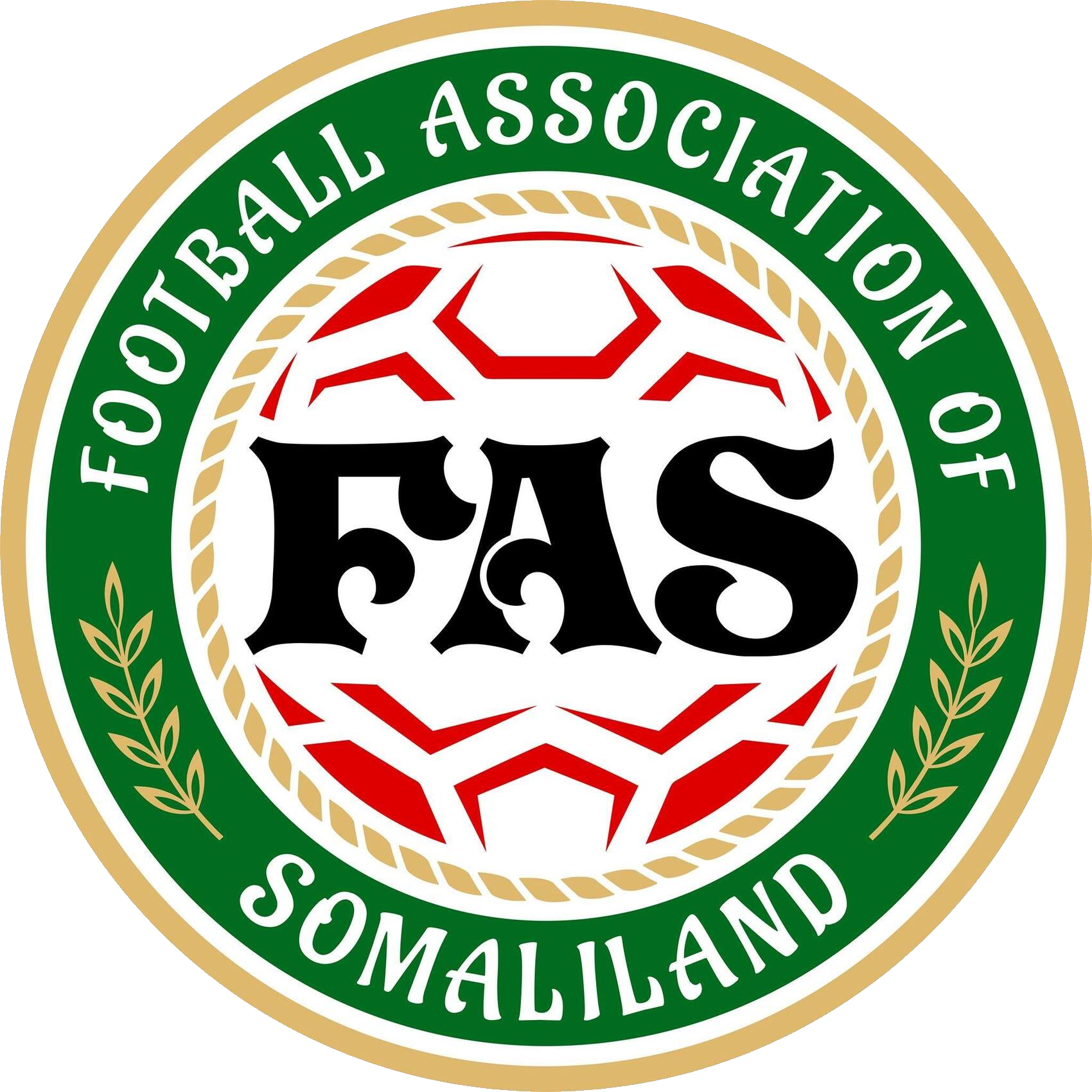
- Sport: Football
- Jurisdiction: Somaliland
- Abbreviation: SFA
- Founded: 2011
- Affiliation: FIFA Application pending Recognition.
- Headquarters: Hargeisa
- Chairperson: Mohamed Abdi Dixood
- Secretary: Samatar Mohamed Abdillahi
- (Somaliland)

The Somaliland Football Association (SFA; Somali: Xidhiidhka Kubadda Cagta Somaliland, Arabic: صوماليلاند اتحاد كرة القدم) is the governing body of football in Somaliland. The association was established in 2011. The current Chairman is Mohamed Abdi Dixood, and the General Secretary is Samatar Mohamed Abdillahi.

== History ==
Somaliland is a former British protectorate which declared independence from Somalia in 1991. Organised football has been held in Somaliland since at least 2002.

In 2011, the Somaliland Football Association was formed as the national governing body for the de facto state.

In 2014, the Somaliland national football team was formed by the Somaliland Football Association. It played its first international match, a 2–2 draw against Sealand, on 17 May 2014 in London, England, United Kingdom. The squad included mostly United Kingdom-based players but was not recognised by the Government of Somaliland which has proved a barrier to FIFA membership.

Somaliland became a member of the Confederation of Independent Football Associations (CONIFA) in 2015 and participated in the 2016 CONIFA World Football Cup held in Abkhazia. The team lost both its matches in the group stage 5–0 and was eliminated from the competition.

In 2018, a group of men from the United Kingdom descended from Somalilanders established the Somaliland Football Academy.

In 2019, Somaliland was announced as the host of the 2020 CONIFA World Football Cup, but this was later revoked due to concerns regarding their ability to fund it.

Somaliland is no longer a member of CONIFA.

== See also ==
- Somaliland national football team
- Ministry of Youth and Sports (Somaliland)
- Hargeisa Stadium
- Alamzey Stadium
