= Patrick McGuire =

Patrick McGuire may refer to:

- Patrick McGuire (footballer) (born 1987), English footballer
- Pat McGuire (politician), Illinois State Senator
- Patrick McGuire, an American Civil War Medal of Honor recipient
- Patrick McGuire (Doctors), a character from Doctors
- Patrick McGuire, a Scottish personal injury solicitor

== See also ==
- Paddy McGuire (1884–1923), silent film actor
- Paddy McGuire (footballer) (1889–1916), English footballer
- Pat McGuire (disambiguation)
- Brian Patrick McGuire (born 1946), American Danish professor of history
- Patrick Maguire (disambiguation)
