= Yusuf Mire Mohamed =

Somali politician

Yusuf Mire Mohamed يوسف محمد مره
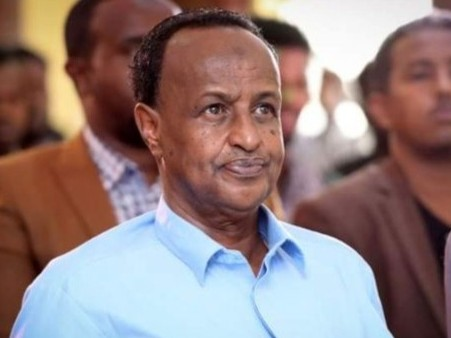

Minister of Youth and Sports
- Incumbent
- Assumed office 14 December 2017
- President: Muse Bihi Abdi
- Preceded by: Abdirisaq Waberi Roble

Personal details
- Party: Peace, Unity, and Development Party

Yusuf Mire Mohamed (Somali: Yuusuf Mire Maxamed) also known as Boos is a Somali politician, who served as the Minister of Youth and Sports of Somaliland.

== Biography ==
Boos is from the Habar Yoonis clan.

In October 2015, President Ahmed Mohamed Mohamoud "Silanyo" carried out a ministerial reshuffle in which Boos was appointed deputy minister of defence.

In December 2016, President Silanyo implemented a cabinet reshuffle in which Boos was dismissed from his post as deputy minister of finance.

=== Governor of Maroodi Jeex ===
On 26 October 2017, President Silanyo appointed Boos as governor of Maroodi Jeex region, replacing Mustafe Abdi Isse; after Muse Bihi Abdi took office December that year Boos entered his cabinet as a minister and Jama Haji Ahmed was appointed as governor of Maroodi Jeex.

=== Youth and Sports Minister ===
On 14 December 2017, newly elected President Muse Bihi Abdi announced his cabinet, appointing Boos as Minister of Youth and Sports.

On 6 January 2018, Boos attended the opening ceremony of the 34th high council meeting of the national youth umbrella SONYO as a guest of honour, where he underlined the government’s commitment to supporting young people and SONYO. In his speech, he stated that "it is young people who change the world, and Somaliland has the advantage of being a peaceful country; development and job creation must come from you yourselves".

On 25 January 2018, Boos criticised the finance minister's decision to disband the Ministry of Finance and prison police football teams, arguing that it did not conform to the ruling Kulmiye party' s programme or principles and that the party' s top priority was to encourage young people; he insisted that clubs should be increased and organised rather than abolished, and stated that decisions on sport lay with the sports minister, whose policy was to expand, not dissolve, the naadi (clubs).

In June 2018, Boos stated that while he had no personal comment regarding the participation of his brother, Axmed Mire, in the Garhajis clan meeting held at Mount Gaanlibah, clan assemblies were the legitimate right of clans and he believed that no decisions would emerge from the gathering that would undermine the nation’s legitimacy or peace. According to the conference’s final communiqué, participants argued that the agreements reached at the 1993 Borama Conference had not been upheld, that national resources were being appropriated by a privileged group under the guise of governmental authority, and that major infrastructures such as the Berbera Port and Berbera Airport had been handed over to foreign companies and governments without following constitutional procedures. The meeting resolved to affirm the unity of the Garhajis clan, to demand the correction of clan-based imbalances in state institutions, to call for a Somaliland to be shared by all, and to insist on the equitable distribution of national resources and rights, as well as the prompt settlement of the clan conflict that had persisted for two years in the El Afweyn District.

In April 2019, Boos attended the Admas University football league, praising the university for supporting its students not only academically but also in sports, and noting that he had also been present at the opening of the tournament the previous year; he went on to underline the importance of sport for health and social interaction, echoing the idea that a sound mind resides in a sound body.

In October 2020, Boos joined his brother, former SNM fighter Axmed Mire Maxamed, President Muse Bihi Abdi and Interior Minister Mohamed Kahin Ahmed for a meeting in Hargeisa; that Axmed Mire had long lived in the United Kingdom after parting ways with Muse Bihi and Mohamed Kahin over differences of opinion, and that this encounter signalled reconciliation between these former SNM comrades.

On 2 September 2021, President Muse Bihi Abdi announced a cabinet reshuffle in which Abdirashid Haji Duale Qambi was appointed Minister of Youth and Sports, replacing Boos.

== See also ==
- Somaliland Regional Games
- Somaliland Football Association
- Somaliland national football team
- List of Somaliland politicians

Political offices
Preceded by Abdirisaq Waberi Roble	Minister of Youth and Sports; 2017–present	Next: Abdirashid Haji Duale Qambi
