= 2021 Southern Frontier Cup =

- Logo of Southern Frontier Cup

Tournament details
- Host country: Surrey
- Cities: Whyteleafe, Tandridge
- Dates: 23–24 May 2020 (postponed); 29–30 May 2021 (cancelled)
- Teams: 4
- Venue: 1 (in 1 host city)

Tournament statistics
- Matches played: 4

The 2021 Southern Frontier Cup is the first edition of the Southern Frontier Cup, an international football tournament held in Surrey, England. It was going to take place from 23 to 24 May 2020 in Whyteleafe, Surrey. The competition was originally scheduled to take place 1 week prior to the 2020 CONIFA World Football Cup in Skopje, North Macedonia, and was intended to serve as a preparation tournament for teams hoping to take part in the World Football Cup which was due to start on 30 May. However, on 20 March 2020 International Surrey Football announced the tournament will be postponed until the summer of 2021 because of the coronavirus pandemic.

On 23 October 2020, International Surrey Football announced that the tournament would be rescheduled for 29–30 May 2021, and would be subject to any COVID-19 restrictions still enforced at the time by the UK Government. On 15 January 2021, International Surrey Football announced the tournament would face further postponement due to continued COVID-19 related uncertainty regarding travel for opposition teams and fan attendance. No new date or time frame was given at the time.

== Format ==
The competition will have the format of a regular knockout competition. The winners of each of the two matches on the first day compete against each other for the Southern Frontier Cup, while the two losing sides play in a third-place match. The trophy will be contested over two days, with each day seeing two matches play back-to-back. Games will be played to 90 minutes if the teams are tied after this time then a penalty shootout will immediately follow.

== Participating teams† ==
Team	Region	ConIFA Ranking (February 2020)	Roonba Ranking (April 2020)
Surrey (Host)	Europe	N/A	411
Cascadia	North America	11	205
Parishes of Jersey	Europe	4	214
Yorkshire	Europe	12	248

† 2020 Teams shown, all 3 invited teams were automatically reinvited to the 2021 edition, but no confirmation of participation has yet been made.

== Venue ==
Whyteleafe, Surrey	Church Road is located in Surrey
Church Road	Church Road is located in Surrey
51.3052027°N 0.0805955°W	Church Road is located in Surrey
Capacity: 2,000	Church Road is located in Surrey
