= Kernow football team =

Unofficial national football team representing the region of the Cornwall

Kernow
- Association: Kernow Football Alliance
- Confederation: ConIFA
- Head coach: Darren Gilbert
- Captain: James Ward
- Most caps: Mark Goldsworthy (6)
- Top scorer: Dan Jennings (7)
First colours

First international
- Cornwall 5–0 Barawa (Bodmin, Cornwall; 25 May 2019)

Biggest win
- Cornwall 10–3 Chagos Islands (Bodmin, Cornwall; 25 August 2019); Cascadia 1–8 Cornwall (London, England; 22 May 2021)

The Kernow football team has represented Cornwall at international association football since 2018. It uses the native Cornish name of the region, Kernow, to represent its team, and is managed by the Kernow Football Alliance. As the side is not a member of UEFA or FIFA, it cannot qualify for the UEFA European Championship or FIFA World Cup, although it is a member of ConIFA and is eligible to participate in the ConIFA World Football Cup and ConIFA European Football Cup. The team is currently managed by Darren Gilbert, and coached by Darren Wright, Andrew Graham and Wayne Roberts. In 2023, Kernow faced the Sápmi football team in a deciding match to join the 2024 ConIFA World Football Cup. Kernow won 2–1, progressing to the 2024 CONIFA World Football Cup finals.

== History ==
Following the 2018 ConIFA World Football Cup held in London, the Kernow Football Alliance was formed by Andrew Bragg and Jason Heaton, and officially joined CONIFA in November 2018. They played their first game on 25 February 2019 against Foxhole Stars in an unofficial game, running out 3–2 winners. The next month, it was announced that they would take part in the 2019 Atlantic Heritage Cup, which was to act as a 2020 ConIFA World Football Cup qualification tournament. However, they withdrew before the tournament, to be replaced by the Chagos Islands. They played their first official international on 25 May 2019 against Barawa, winning 5–0 in Bodmin.

Kernow entered the 2024 CONIFA World Cup Qualification, where they were placed in Group A with Sápmi. They beat Sápmi 2–1 and qualified for the 2024 CONIFA World Cup.

== Tournament records ==
=== ConIFA World Football Cup record ===
Year	Position	GP	W	D	L	GS	GA
(Sápmi) 2014	Not a CONIFA Member						
(Abkhazia) 2016	Not a CONIFA Member						
(Ogaden) 2018	Not a CONIFA Member						
(North Macedonia) 2020	Cancelled						
(Kurdistan Region) 2024	Qualified						

== Recent fixtures and results ==
25 February 2019 Unofficial Friendly	Kernow (Cornwall)	3–2	(Cornwall) Foxhole Stars XI	St Austell
19:30	Clarke 28'; Brokenshire 50' (pen.); Eddy 56'	Report	Jennings 71' (pen.); Downing 75'	Stadium: Poltair Park

13 May 2019 Unofficial Friendly	Kernow (Cornwall)	5–0	(Cornwall) St Dennis	Bodmin
19:30	Goldsworthy 4', 90'; Lorenz 70'; Annear 80', 88'			Stadium: Priory Park

25 May 2019 Friendly	Kernow (Cornwall)	5–0	Barawa	Bodmin
15:00	C. Turner 18'; Lorenz 19'; Goldsworthy 48'; Eddy 64', 80'	Report		Stadium: Priory Park

31 May 2019 2019 Atlantic Heritage Cup	Ellan Vannin	Cancelled	(Cornwall) Kernow	Ossett, Yorkshire
17:00				Stadium: Ingfield Stadium

1 May 2019 2019 Atlantic Heritage Cup	Yorkshire	Cancelled	(Cornwall) Kernow	Ossett, Yorkshire
12:30				Stadium: Ingfield Stadium

2 June 2019 2019 Atlantic Heritage Cup	Kernow (Cornwall)	Cancelled	Parishes of Jersey	Harrogate, Yorkshire
19:45				Stadium: CNG Stadium

28 July 2019 Unofficial Friendly	Mousehole (Cornwall)	Cancelled	(Cornwall) Kernow	Mousehole
				Stadium: Trungle Parc

25 August 2019 Friendly	Kernow (Cornwall)	10–3	Chagos Islands	Bodmin
16:00	Goldsworthy 9', 20', 65' (pen.); Brokenshire 13'; Jennings 42', 45', 78', 88'; Jacques 57' (o.g.); Summers 62'	Report	Sooprayen 27', 76', 90'	Stadium: Priory Park

22 May 2021 Prost International Trophy	Cascadia	1–8	(Cornwall) Kernow	Northwood, London
15:00		Report	Mitchell, Turner, Gilbert (3), Clarke, Jennings (2)	Stadium: Acretweed Stadium

5 June 2022 2022 CONIFA European Football Cup	Elba Island	Cancelled	(Cornwall) Kernow	Nice, France

6 June 2022 2022 CONIFA European Football Cup	Artsakh	Cancelled	(Cornwall) Kernow	Nice, France

16 July 2023 2024 CONIFA World Cup Qualification	Kernow (Cornwall)	2–1	Sápmi	Falmouth
13:00	Gilbert Jennings	Report	Leppakangas	Stadium: Bickland Park

21 July 2024 Friendly	Kernow (Cornwall)	5 - 2	(British Indian Ocean Territory) Chagos BIOT	Liskeard
15:00 BST				Stadium: Lux Park

== Selected International Opponents ==
Opponents	Matches	Win	Draw	Loss	GF	GA
Barawa	1	1	0	0	5	0
Cascadia	1	1	0	0	8	1
Chagos Islands	1	1	0	0	10	3
(British Indian Ocean Territory) Chagos BIOT	1	1	0	0	5	2
Sápmi	1	1	0	0	2	1

== Players ==
=== Current squad ===
The following players were called up to a friendly against Chagos Islands on 25 August 2019.

Caps and goals correct as of 16 July 2024 after the game against FA Sapmi. CONIFA includes unofficial friendlies towards the caps total.

No.	Pos.	Player	Date of birth (age)	Caps	Goals	Club
1	GK	Jason Robertson	28 November 2003 (age 22)	3	0	(Kernow football team) Helston Athletic
5	DF	Tom Whipp	28 November 1998 (age 27)	4	0	(Kernow football team) Bodmin Town
2	DF	Ed Timmons		3	0	(Kernow football team) Helston Athletic
6	DF	James Ward (captain)		4	0	(Kernow football team) Falmouth Town
3	DF	Will Tinsley		1	0	(Kernow football team) AFC St Austell
4	DF	Jack Calver		1	0	(The Football Association) Plymouth Parkway
14	DF	Billy Palfrey		0	0	(The Football Association) Plymouth Parkway
15	DF	Kieran Conibear-Trathen		0	0	(Swedish Football Association) Sandviks IK
7	MF	Harry Clarke		5	2	(Kernow football team) Bodmin Town
8	MF	Olly Brokenshire		3	2	(Kernow football team) Helston Athletic
12	MF	Max Gilbert		5	4	(Kernow football team) Bodmin Town
16	MF	Cameron Turner		2	2	(Kernow football team) Bodmin Town
11	MF	Hayden Turner		2	1	(Kernow football team) Mousehole
17	MF	Josh Bragg		0	0	(Swedish Football Association) Åtvidabergs FF
18	MF	Harry Evans		0	0	(Football Australia) ECU Joondalup
19	MF	Shane White		1	0	(The Football Association) Taunton Town
9	FW	Mark Goldsworthy		6	6	(Kernow football team) Helston Athletic
10	FW	Dan Jennings	3 September 2003 (age 23)	3	7	(Kernow football team) Bodmin Town
20	FW	Josh Grant		0	0	(The Football Association) Tavistock
21	FW	Andy Watkins	28 November 2000 (age 25)	0	0	(The Football Association) Bath City

=== Recent call-ups ===
The following players have been called up in the past twelve months or withdrew from the squad due to injury or suspension.

Pos.	Player	Date of birth (age)	Caps	Goals	Club	Latest call-up

== Cornish footballers who represented FIFA national teams ==
- (England) Nigel Martyn
- (Republic of Ireland) Chris Morris
