= Abdirisaq Waberi Roble =

Somali politician

Abdirisaq Waberi Roble عبد الرزاق وابيري روبله

Minister of Youth and Sports
- In office 12 December 2016 – 14 December 2017
- President: Ahmed Mohamed Mohamoud
- Preceded by: Abdillahi Farah Maidane
- Succeeded by: Yusuf Mire Mohamed

Abdirisaq Waberi Roble (Somali: Cabdirisaaq Waaberi Rooble) is a Somali politician, He previously served as the Minister of Youth and Sports of Somaliland, from December 2016 to December 2017.

== See also ==
- Politics of Somaliland
- Ministry of Youth and Sports (Somaliland)
- Cabinet of Somaliland

Political offices
| Preceded by Abdillahi Farah Maidane | Minister of Youth and Sports; 2016-2017 | Succeeded by Yusuf Mire Mohamed |
