= Sport in the Principality of Sealand =

The Principality of Sealand, an unrecognized micronation situated on HM Fort Roughs in the North Sea, has national sport teams that compete in association football and American football. Additionally, the micronation has been the site of a skateboarding event, a half-marathon, and a long-distance swimming event.

== Association football ==
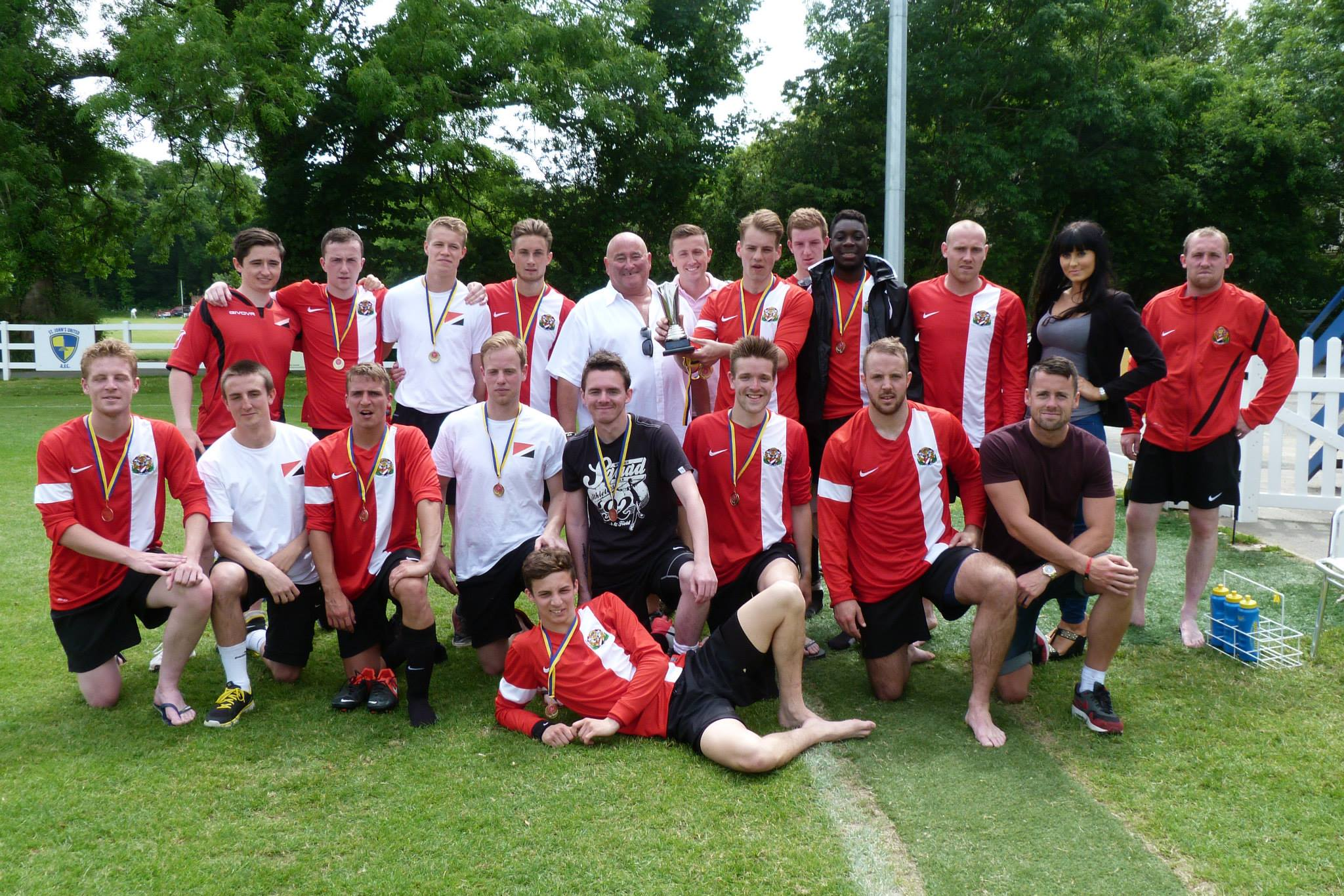
The Sealand national football team in 2013

The Sealand national football team was founded in 2003. The team was originally the team of Vestbjerg, but a Danish hotel manager named Christian Olsen convinced Michael Bates to allow the team to represent Sealand. The team's first game was a 2-2 draw against the Åland official football team. Sealand hoped to arrange a game against the Tibet national football team, but this never materialized, and the team from Vestbjerg ceased activities in 2009.

In 2009, Scottish author Neil Forsyth was appointed manager of the revised team. The Sealand team played against the Chagos Islands national football team in 2012, losing 3-1. This was Sealand's first game as a member of the N.F.-Board. The game was also the first international football game to be held in Surrey. Forsyth was replaced in 2013 by Julian Dicks to lead the Sealand team at the Tynwald Hill International Football Tournament. Under Dicks, the team won their first game, defeating the Alderney official football team with a 2-1 victory. Since then, the team has been led by Ed Stubbs. Stubbs is the most successful manager in the team's history, with the team having won 71.43% of their games under his management as of 2023.

Notable players for Sealand have included Simon Charlton and Ralf Little. The team's mascot is a seal.

== American football ==
The Sealand Seahawks, the official American football club of Sealand, was founded in the summer of 2021 by husband-and-wife Mike and Nia Ireland and Mikey Gray. The trio who were veterans of the sport in the United Kingdom, and Mike Ireland and Mikey Gray had the idea to create a Sealand national team while in a pub. They attained permission from Sealand and the team won their first game against the South Dublin Panthers in a 42-13 victory that year. As of 2022, the club had men's, women's, flag, and masters (players over 35 years old) teams, and had over 200 players and staff.

== Other sports ==
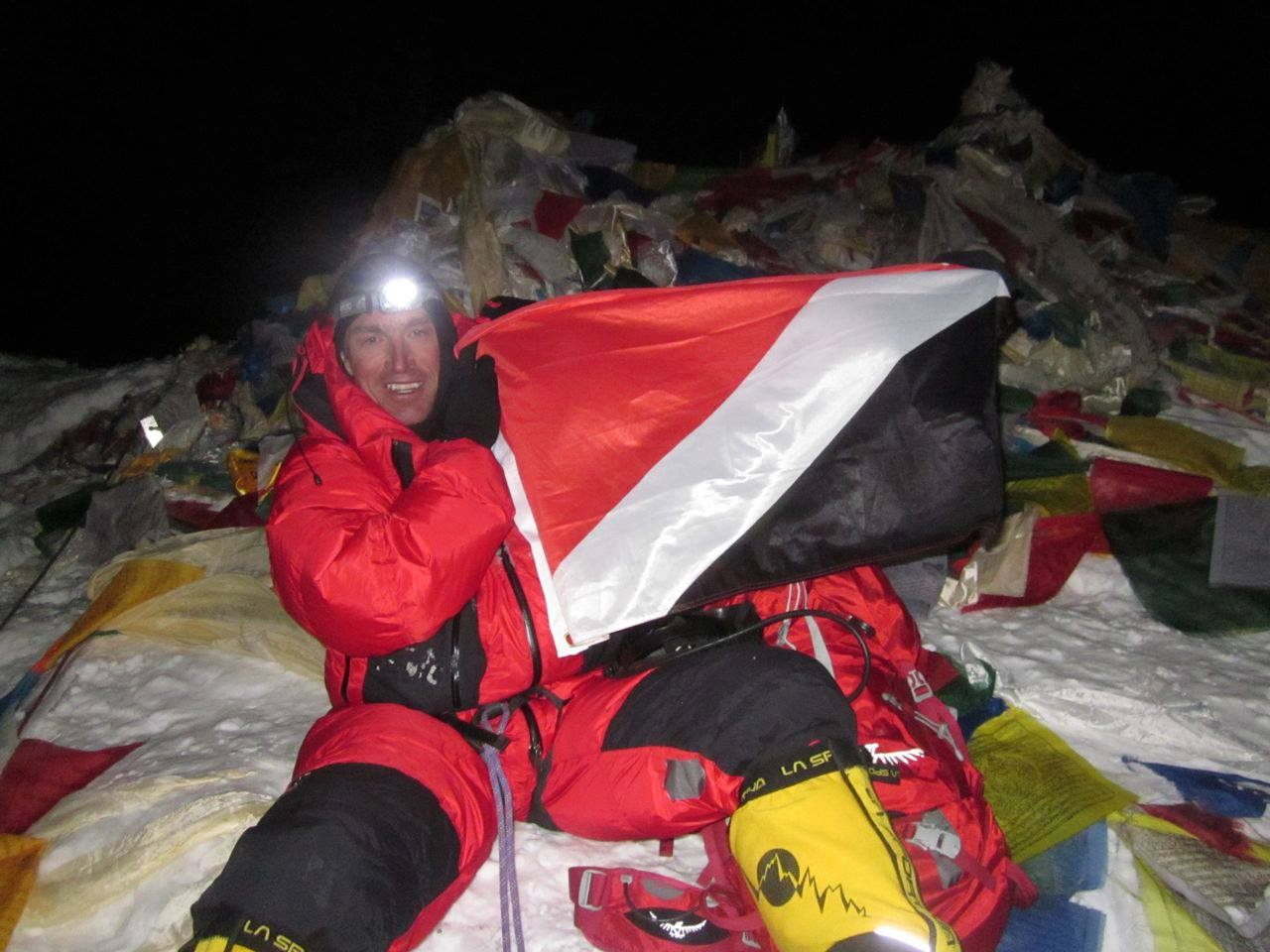
Kenton Cool with the flag of Sealand at the peak of Mount Everest in 2015

At the 2007 World Kung Fu Championship, Canadian martial artist Michael Martelle represented Sealand, bearing the micronation's designation of Athleta Principalitas Bellatorius (transl. Principal Martial Arts Athlete and Champion). In 2008, a non-competitive skateboarding event sponsored by Red Bull was hosted on HM Forts Rough itself. Additionally, Sealand participated in the UK ultimate nationals in 2010, placing 11th.

In 2004, mountaineer Slader Oviatt carried the national flag of Sealand to the peak of Muztagh Ata. Mountaineer Kenton Cool went on to carry the national flag to the peak of Mount Everest in 2015. Simon Messenger ran a half-marathon on Sealand in 2015 as part of "around the world in 80 races", a challenge to run races in 80 locations around the world. Due to the space limitations of HM Forts Rough, the half-marathon was completed on a treadmill on the fort.

On August 20, 2018, competitive swimmer Richard Royal swam the 12 km (7.5 mi) from Sealand to Felixstowe in three hours and twenty-nine minutes. Royal was subsequently awarded a Sealand Knighthood by Michael Bates. Two days prior to Royal's swim, a man named Nick Glendinning swam from Sealand to Bawdsey in just under five hours. Royal alleged that Glendinning had attempted to deceive maritime authorities, but Glendinning maintained that the timing was coincidental. The British Long Distance Swimming Association formally recognizes Royal's swim as the inaugural first swim from Sealand to the mainland UK, and the swim was verified by the World Open Water Swimming Association and Guinness World Records. With the support of Sealand, Royal worked with spinal injury charity Aspire to establish the swim from Sealand to Felixstowe as an event to raise money for the charity. The swim has since been made by other swimmers for the charity.
