= Seborga national football team =

Seborga
- Association: Seborga Football Federation (FCPS)
- Confederation: N.F.-Board
- Head coach: Fabrizio Gatti
- Top scorer: Siberie; Cutellè (2)
- Home stadium: Stadio Comunale, Ospedaletti
First colours

First international
- Seborga 2–3 Sealand (Ospedaletti, Italy; 10 August 2014)

Biggest win
- Seborga 2–0 SSD Bergamo Longuelo (Ospedaletti, Italy; 9 May 2015)

Biggest defeat
- Seborga 2–3 Sealand (Ospedaletti, Italy; 10 August 2014)

The Seborga national football team is the team that represents the Principality of Seborga. It is not a member of FIFA or UEFA, but is an associate member of the N.F.-Board, an organisation for teams who are not members of FIFA. They were admitted to the N.F.-Board as a provisional member in 2014.

== Seborga Football Federation ==
The Seborga Football Federation is the football association of Seborga. It was founded on June 6, 2014, in conjunction with the national football team.

== History ==
=== Foundation ===
The team was then admitted to the N.F.-Board and the signing of the registration act to the federation took place in Seborga at the presence of the President of CONS Marcello Paris, the Crown Counselor for Sports Giuseppe Bernardi, the Crown Counselor for Foreign Affairs and Princess Consort Nina Menegatto and the Seborgan Representative for Alsace Marcel Mentil. The board of directors of the FCPS is composed by Claudio Gazzano, Matteo Bianchini, Marcel Mentil and Linda Chittolini.

The first international game of the Seborgan team was disputed on August 10, 2014, in Ospedaletti against Sealand. For the occasion most of the Seborga players were lent by the local team ASD Ospedaletti. The game ended 2-3 and Seborga lost.

== Overall record ==
| Opponent | Pld | W | D* | L | GF | GA |
|---|---|---|---|---|---|---|
| Sealand | 1 | 0 | 0 | 1 | 2 | 3 |
| SSD Bergamo Longuelo | 1 | 1 | 0 | 0 | 2 | 0 |
| Total | 2 | 1 | 0 | 1 | 4 | 3 |

*Denotes draws include knockout matches decided on penalty kicks.

== International results and upcoming fixtures ==
| 10-08-2014 | Ospedaletti, Italy | Seborga | Sealand | 2–3 |
| 09-05-2015 | Ospedaletti, Italy | Seborga | SSD Bergamo Longuelo | 2–0 |

== Kit ==
Seborga's kit has the same colors as the flag of Seborga. The main uniform of Seborga has a blue shirt with a white cross, blue shorts and white socks. The technical sponsor is FOOTEX.

== Futsal Team ==
In 2021 CONIFA hosted the 2021 CONIFA No Limits Mediterranean Futsal Cup in Sanremo, while not a member of CONIFA Seborga participated in the 6-team competition.

September 11, 2021
15:00 GMT+2
Group Stage

| Seborga | 1–5 | County of Nice |
|---|---|---|
| Goal | | Goal |

September 11, 2021
15:30 GMT+2
Group Stage

| County of Nice | 2–1 | Sicily |
|---|---|---|
| Goal | | Goal |

September 11, 2021
18:00 GMT+2
Fifth-Place play-off

| Terra Brigasca | 3–4 | Seborga |
|---|---|---|
| Goal | | Goal |
