= Somaliland Regional Games =

- Abbreviation: SLR Games
- Purpose: Multi-sport event for regions of Somaliland
- Frequency: Every 2 years
- Inaugurated: 2011 in Burao, Somaliland
- Headquarters: Hargeisa, Somaliland

The Somaliland Regional Games (SLR Games) is a multi-sport event involving athletes from the Regions of Somaliland. The event was first held in 2011, and has taken place every two or four years since then. The games is under regulation of the Ministry of Youth and Sports (Somaliland) with supervision by the Somaliland Football Association.

== See also ==
- Alamzey Stadium
- Somaliland national football team
