= ABFC =

ABFC may refer to:

- Australian Border Force Cutter, ships operated by the Marine Unit, Australian Border Force
- All Black FC, a football club based in Hong Kong
- Austin Bold FC, former professional soccer team in Austin, Texas, US
- Armagh Blues F.C., Mid-Ulster League football team from County Armagh, Northern Ireland
- Ambari Falakata (station code), in the List of railway stations in India
- Advanced Base Functional Component, in the List of U.S. government and military acronyms
- Autorails de Bourgogne-Franche-Comté, a company with preserved SNCF Class X 3800 railcars
