= World Unity Football Alliance =

International governing body for association football teams unaffiliated with FIFA

- Formation: 7 July 2020; 6 years ago
- Type: Federation of associations
- Members: 19 members
- Official languages: English, Spanish

The World Unity Football Alliance (WUFA) was an international governing body for association football teams that are not affiliated with FIFA, similar to but smaller than the older Confederation of Independent Football Associations. As of May 2025, WUFA is inactive.

== History ==
WUFA initially announced 9 founding members, and were joined by the Yorkshire International Football Association on 8 July. Of the 19 members of WUFA, 7 are also members of CONIFA, Darfur left CONIFA prior to establishing WUFA, and Surrey were not a member of any federation prior to joining WUFA. On 13 July 2020, WUFA announced a partnership with COSANFF – Consejo Sudamericano de Nuevas Federaciones de Fútbol, establishing an alliance. 3 members, the Armenian Argentine Community, Rapa Nui (Easter Island) and Mapuche Nation later joined as members of the World Unity Football Alliance as well as the COSANFF.

On 12 September 2020, WUFA announced their first tournament, the World Series, scheduled for 2021. On 6 April 2021, International Surrey Football announced it would host the first stage of the WUFA World Series, all 4 games were played behind closed doors due in part to local COVID-19 restrictions imposed in the United Kingdom at the time. On 7 July 2021, WUFA announced the Kashmir Football Association as its newest member. Kashmir was not previously a member of any non-FIFA organisation prior to joining WUFA. On 29 June 2021, WUFA announced plans to organise the WUFA Women's World Unity Cup, its first major international tournament. On 15 March 2022, the World Unity Football Alliance announced the election of its first general secretary, president and founder of members International Surrey Football.

== Former Members ==
Europe (3)
Team	M	W
Parishes of Jersey	Yes	No
Surrey	Yes	Yes
Yorkshire	Yes	No

Asia (4)
Team	M	W
All Black FC Hong Kong	Yes	No
Karen	Yes	Yes
Kashmir	Yes	Yes
Tamil Eelam	Yes	Yes

Africa (5)
Team	M	W
Barawa	Yes	No
Chagos Islands	Yes	No
Darfur	Yes	Yes
Matabeleland	Yes	Yes
Western Sahara	Yes	Yes

North America (2)
Team	M	W
California	Yes	No
Kuskatan	Yes	No

South America (4)
Team	M	W
Armenian Argentine Community	Yes	No
Mapuches	Yes	No
Easter Island	Yes	No
São Paulo	Yes	No

Oceania (1)
Team	M	W
West Papua	Yes	No

=== Member Federation ===
- Consejo Sudamericano de Nuevas Federaciones de Fútbol (COSANFF)

== Tournaments ==
=== World Series ===
- WUFA World Series
  - 2021 WUFA World Series: Surrey Stage

Semi-finals
16 May 2021 – Worplesdon
Surrey	1
Chagos Islands	3
16 May 2021 – Worplesdon
Barawa	3
(Morocco) Maghreb	1

Final
23 May 2021 – Worplesdon
Chagos Islands	2 (5)
Barawa	2 (4)
Third-place playoff
23 May 2021 – Worplesdon
Surrey	2
(Morocco) Maghreb	1

== Organisation ==
=== General secretary ===
General Secretary of WUFA
No.	Name	Country of origin	Took office	Left office
1	Danny Clarke	United Kingdom	18 February 2022	30 June 2023

== See also ==
- Non-FIFA international football
- New Football Federations-Board
- CONIFA – Several WUFA members hold membership of the CONIFA
