= Jersey national football team =

Jersey national football team may refer to:

- Jersey official football team (active since 1905), which represents Jersey in non-FIFA international matches, including the Muratti Vase
- Parishes of Jersey football team (active since 2018), which represents Jersey in CONIFA tournaments
