= Patrick Maguire =

Patrick Maguire may refer to:

- Patrick Maguire (politician) (died 1970), Irish Fianna Fáil politician
- Patrick Maguire (bishop) (died 1826), Irish Roman Catholic prelate
- Patrick Leo Maguire (1903–1985), Irish singer-songwriter and radio presenter
- Patrick Maguire House, on National Register of Historic Places listings in Maury County, Tennessee
- Pat Maguire (boxer) in 1966 British Empire and Commonwealth Games

== See also ==
- Paddy Maguire (disambiguation)
- Pat McGuire (disambiguation)
- Patrick McGuire (disambiguation)
