= Yorkshire football team =

CONIFA regional football team

Yorkshire
- Nickname: The Vikings
- Association: Yorkshire International Football Association
- Confederation: WUFA
- Head coach: Paddy McGuire
- Captain: Paddy McGuire
- Most caps: Jordan Coduri (7)
- Top scorer: Jordan Coduri, Tom Greaves, Brodie Litchfield (4)
- Home stadium: Various
First colours	Second colours

First international
- Yorkshire 1–1 Ellan Vannin (Fitzwilliam, Yorkshire; 28 January 2018)

Biggest win
- Yorkshire 8–1 Kashmir (Ossett, Yorkshire; 17 October 2021)

Biggest defeat
- Parishes of Jersey 2–1 Yorkshire (Saint Peter, Jersey; 21 October 2018); Yorkshire 1–2 Tamil Eelam (Ossett, Yorkshire; 10 October 2019)

The Yorkshire football team represents Yorkshire as a region in international association football. The team is not currently a member of a European or world governing body and as the team is not a member of UEFA or FIFA, it cannot qualify for the UEFA European Championship or FIFA World Cup. The team was previously a member of CONIFA and was eligible to participate in the CONIFA World Football Cup and CONIFA European Football Cup. The team was latterly a member of WUFA, which as of 2025 is an inactive governing body.

The Yorkshire team does not have a home stadium, instead choosing to play at various venues throughout the region. Founded in 2017, the team was initially controlled by the Yorkshire International Football Association (YIFA), but after many of the key figures in the creation of YIFA and the representative team left their roles, YIFA was quietly disbanded. Yorkshire's first ever game, a CONIFA match, ended in a 1–1 draw with Ellan Vannin. This match took place on 28 January 2018 at the Yorkshire NuBuilds Stadium in Fitzwilliam, covered by a wide range of media organisations including BBC Look North and Channel 4 News, conducting interviews with key players and YIFA personnel.

== History ==
=== Early attempts at a Yorkshire team ===
Despite Yorkshire having a representative schoolboy team for many years, there was no formal senior equivalent until 1924 when the West Riding County Football Association put together a men's side as part of the jubilee of the University of Leeds. Players were chosen from Bradford City, Bradford Park Avenue, Halifax Town, Huddersfield Town and Leeds United. Although the team won 2–0, it did not represent the whole county. In 1935, a Yorkshire team made up of players from leading clubs across the entire region, including Bradford City, Huddersfield Town, Leeds United and Sheffield United, took on a team formed of Middlesbrough, Newcastle United and Sunderland players at the latter's Roker Park ground as part of the Queen's jubilee celebrations. Once again, however, the team, which beat the North East side 3–2, was reported as representing only West Yorkshire.

=== First official Yorkshire international team ===
Officially established on 16 July 2017, YIFA held a foundation meeting in October of the same year at the Square Chapel, Halifax, to sign off its constitution and formalise its existence as a footballing body. In attendance were YIFA Chairman Phil Hegarty, Yorkshire Party Executive Committee member Matthew Thomas and Godzown Sport's Director Simon Gibson, who signed the constitution into being. Godzown Sports also unveiled the team's first ever home kit, as primary kit manufacturer. While organising a senior Yorkshire international football team was its primary focus, YIFA also gave notice of its intention to seek membership of CONIFA. Plans for a senior women's team and disability teams were also announced. The announcement caught the attention of national and international sports and news media, many of whom covered open trials held by YIFA, to identify eligible Yorkshire footballers. A number of high-profile magazine, radio, newspaper and television publishers continued to cover the developments through to the team's first game.

On 13 November 2017, YIFA announced that Bradford City Academy Coach Ryan Farrell, assisted by Micky Long, had been appointed as Yorkshire's first ever Head Coach. On 6 January 2018, ahead of the friendly against Ellan Vannin, Yorkshire was accepted as a member of CONIFA. The following week, Matt Bradley of Dinnington Town was the first player revealed to have been called up to the Yorkshire team, while Paddy McGuire, who then played for Thackley, was named the first captain. YIFA announced a major sponsorship deal had been agreed with Utilita Energy, who became primary sponsors of the home and away kits, as part of their focus on wider football sponsorship. In January 2018 CONIFA formally accepted YIFA's bid for membership which coincided with a good showing in the 2017 general election by the Yorkshire Party, along with the upcoming devolution debates and mayoral elections, prompting some in Yorkshire and across the United Kingdom to question if the unprecedented interest in YIFA and the Yorkshire team was a reflection on a cry for independence by Yorkshire's population. As an association with close ties to the Yorkshire Party YIFA were supportive of the party's "one Yorkshire" devolution stance.

In their first official fixture Yorkshire battled to a 1–1 draw versus Ellan Vannin (the Isle of Man), in a CONIFA friendly, in front of a capacity crowd at the Yorkshire NuBuilds Stadium, in Fitzwilliam. Jordan Coduri became Yorkshire's first ever goalscorer, with his strike to equalise the game. After an initial flurry of fixtures Yorkshire's progress was interrupted by the outbreak of the COVID-19 pandemic, with future fixtures against Chagos Islands and Panjab both postponed, then cancelled. Around this time the YIFA association, which had initially created the Yorkshire football team, and many of its original committee and management structure were disbanded, with key figures from the team's coaching staff taking on responsibility for overseeing the team, without an association structure. This new management committee led to the deletion of all YIFA social media accounts, the team and association's official website and the disbanding of the official supporter's club structure, with the loss of thousands of subscribers and followers, and national media interest in the team waned.

Yorkshire's new management committee made the decision to apply for membership of the World Unity Football Alliance and for a short while were members of CONIFA and WUFA simultaneously. The team did not play again until October 2021, when it defeated Kashmir. In June 2022 Head Coach Ryan Farrell stepped down from his position with YIFA, to concentrate on his professional domestic duties with captain Paddy McGuire announced as his replacement. Later the same month FC Halifax Town's Assistant Manager Andy Cooper was announced as an addition to the coaching team, bringing a wealth of experience from his time as Leeds United's U23 Manager.

=== Decline and inactivity ===
Following the abandoned 2021 WUFA World Series tournament Yorkshire have not competed in any competitive fixtures. Due to WUFA's subsequent collapse as a football governing body Yorkshire have no membership to a European or world governing body and interest in the Yorkshire team has dwindled due to inactivity, though their social media channels sporadically post content and retain a small public following. It is unclear why Yorkshire are no longer members of CONIFA, or what future plans are for the team in terms of governing body membership.

== Social Responsibility ==
A primary aim of YIFA and the Yorkshire football team was to promote Yorkshire on an international stage and to raise awareness of Yorkshire identity and culture. Alongside this YIFA were able to provide support to people from around the world, via its membership of CONIFA. A notable example of this was when a terrorist attack at a stadium in Barawa led to the deaths of a number of civilians, on the eve of their friendly against the Yorkshire team. YIFA General Manager Matthew Thomas, who was responsible for supporter liaison and media duties, led media engagement in the United Kingdom to help the Barawan's raise awareness of the situation.

== Team colours ==
Yorkshire's traditional home kit colour is blue, drawing on the blue of the Yorkshire flag. The current kit is provided by Yorkshire-based sportswear company, Godzown Sports.

== Logo ==
Inspired by the Yorkshire flag, the crest of the Yorkshire International Football Association featured a stylised White Rose of York on a blue shield, with "Yorkshire International Football Association" written across the top of the shield. This motif featured on all of the Yorkshire football team's kits, as the official team crest, and on all social media and websites, until the disbanding of YIFA. A later variation of this crest was then adopted with the motto changed to "Yorkshire Representative Football Team", otherwise identical to the former YIFA crest.

== Tournament records ==
=== CONIFA World Football Cup record ===
Year	Position	GP	W	D	L	GS	GA
(Sápmi) 2014	Not a CONIFA member						
(Abkhazia) 2016	Not a CONIFA member						
(Ogaden) 2018	Did not qualify						
(North Macedonia) 2020	Tournament suspended						

=== CONIFA European Football Cup record ===
Year	Position	GP	W	D	L	GS	GA
(Székely Land) 2015	Not a CONIFA member						
(Northern Cyprus) 2017	Not a CONIFA member						
(Republic of Artsakh) 2019	Did not qualify						
(County of Nice) 2021	Tournament suspended						
(Northern Cyprus) 2023	Tournament suspended						

== Fixtures and results ==
Win Draw Loss

=== 2018 ===
28 January Friendly	Yorkshire	1–1	Ellan Vannin	Fitzwilliam
15:30 GMT	Coduri 54'	Report	Davies 48'	Stadium: Yorkshire NuBuilds Stadium; Attendance: 627; Referee: Steve Lynch

25 March Friendly	Yorkshire	6–0	Chagos Islands	Fitzwilliam
15:00 BST	Collier 14', 29'; Rhodes 44'; Hobson 56'; Mole 68'; Bradley 78'	Report		Stadium: Yorkshire NuBuilds Stadium; Attendance: 532

15 April Friendly	Barawa	2–7	Yorkshire	London
17:00 BST	53' 65'		Hurtley 26'; Coduri 50', 72', 88'; Rigby 60'; Rhodes 78', 90'	Stadium: Coles Park Stadium

21 October Friendly	Parishes of Jersey	2–1	Yorkshire	Saint Peter, Jersey
15:30 BST	Boyle 23'; C. Weir 76'		Ripley 83'	Stadium: La Rue des Vignes

18 November Friendly	Yorkshire	5–4	Panjab	Ossett
16:00 GMT	Greaves 5', 38', 65', 72'; Litchfield 51'		J. Panesar 1'; Minhas 12'; Singh Sandhu 56'; Zia 63'	Stadium: Ingfield Stadium

=== 2019 ===
4 May Friendly	Yorkshire	6–2	Somaliland	Athersley
15:00 BST	Walshaw 19' (pen.), 73', 83'; Dempsey 42'; Litchfield 64'; Normanton 75'	Report	Abdi 49', 87'	Stadium: Sheerien Park

1 June 2019 Atlantic Heritage Cup	Yorkshire	1–0	Parishes of Jersey	Ossett
15:00	Litchfield 90+3'			Stadium: Ingfield Stadium; Attendance: 521; Referee: Karl Parker

TBC 2019 Atlantic Heritage Cup	Chagos Islands	Postponed	Yorkshire	TBC
		No revised fixture agreed

10 October Friendly	Yorkshire	1–2	Tamil Eelam	Ossett
19:45	Litchfield 87'		Thomas A. 19'; Prashanth R. 80'	Stadium: Ingfield Stadium; Attendance: 175

=== 2021 ===
17 October Friendly	Yorkshire	8 - 1	Kashmir	Ossett
				Stadium: Ingfield Stadium

== Selected international opponents ==
Opponents	Matches	Win	Draw	Loss	GF	GA
Barawa	1	1	0	0	7	2
Chagos Islands	1	1	0	0	6	0
Ellan Vannin	1	0	1	0	1	1
Parishes of Jersey	2	1	0	1	2	2
Kashmir	1	1	0	0	8	1
Panjab	1	1	0	0	5	4
Somaliland	1	1	0	0	6	2
Tamil Eelam	1	0	0	1	1	2

== Players ==
The following players were called up to the squad for the friendly against Tamil Eelam on 10 October 2019.

Caps and goals correct as of 1 June 2019 after the game against Parishes of Jersey.

No.	Pos.	Player	Date of birth (age)	Caps	Goals	Club
	GK	George Clarke	11 May 2000 (age 26)	3	0	(Yorkshire football team) Brighouse Town
	GK	Luke Wilson	28 November 2000 (age 25)	1	0	(Yorkshire football team) Thackley
	DF	Danny Buttle		4	0	(Yorkshire football team) Handsworth Parramore
	DF	Isaac Baldwin		0	0	(Yorkshire football team) Farsley Celtic
	DF	Kris Hargreaves		0	0	(Yorkshire football team) Thackley
	DF	Joshua Dacre	22 June 1996 (age 30)	1	0	(Yorkshire football team) Goole
	MF	Jordan Coduri		7	4	(Yorkshire football team) Penistone Church
	MF	Paddy McGuire (captain)	29 July 1987 (age 39)	6	0	(Yorkshire football team) Thackley
	MF	Cameron Rigby	20 January 1997 (age 29)	4	1	(Yorkshire football team) Maltby Main
	MF	Jack Normanton	7 April 1997 (age 29)	2	1	(Yorkshire football team) Brighouse Town
	MF	Kieron Thompson		0	0	(Yorkshire football team) Thackley
	MF	Sam Barker		0	0	(Yorkshire football team) Harrogate Railway Athletic
	FW	Matt Bradley	28 November 1998 (age 27)	5	1	(Yorkshire football team) Dinnington Town
	FW	Brodie Litchfield	17 October 1997 (age 29)	3	3	(Lancashire Football Association) FC United of Manchester
	FW	James Wilshaw	12 February 1984 (age 42)	1	3	(Yorkshire football team) Scarborough Athletic

== Recent call-ups ==
The following players have been called up in the previous twelve months or withdrew from the squad due to injury or suspension.

Pos.	Player	Date of birth (age)	Caps	Goals	Club	Latest call-up
GK	Kyle Trenerry	10 July 1999 (age 27)	1	0	(Yorkshire) Farsley Celtic	v. Parishes of Jersey, 1 June 2019
GK	Ed Hall	31 October 1992 (age 34)	4	0	(Yorkshire) Stocksbridge Park Steels	v. Panjab, 18 November 2018
DF	Ben Rhodes	28 November 1999 (age 26)	6	3	(Yorkshire) Stocksbridge Park Steels	v. Parishes of Jersey, 1 June 2019
DF	Eddy Busfield	23 May 1997 (age 29)	3	0	(Yorkshire) Nostell Miners Welfare	v. Parishes of Jersey, 1 June 2019
DF	Matt Dempsey	6 February 1990 (age 36)	2	1	(England) FC United of Manchester	v. Parishes of Jersey, 1 June 2019
DF	Connor Smythe	11 January 1996 (age 30)	1	0	(Yorkshire) Pontefract Collieries	v. Parishes of Jersey, 1 June 2019
DF	James Knowles	23 May 1983 (age 43)	1	0	(Yorkshire) Ossett United	v. Parishes of Jersey, 1 June 2019
DF	Lawrence Hunter		6	0	(Yorkshire) Knaresborough Town	v. Somaliland, 4 May 2019
DF	Andy McManus	26 July 1987 (age 39)	5	0	(Yorkshire) Athersley Recreation	v. Panjab, 18 November 2018
DF	Alex McQuade	7 November 1992 (age 34)	1	0	(Yorkshire) Ossett United	v. Panjab, 18 November 2018
MF	Adam Hayton (vice-captain)		6	0	(Yorkshire) Nostell Miners Welfare	v. Parishes of Jersey, 1 June 2019
MF	Ross Daly	3 May 1989 (age 37)	1	0	(England) Hyde United	v. Parishes of Jersey, 1 June 2019
MF	Corey Gregory	22 February 1993 (age 33)	1	0	(Yorkshire) Ossett United	v. Parishes of Jersey, 1 June 2019
MF	Nathan Valentine	5 October 1993 (age 33)	0	0	(Yorkshire) Scarborough Athletic	v. Parishes of Jersey, 1 June 2019
MF	Jordan Emery		2	0	(Yorkshire) Armthorpe Welfare	v. Panjab, 18 November 2018
FW	Tom Greaves (vice-captain)	23 April 1985 (age 41)	3	4	(England) Bury AFC	v. Parishes of Jersey, 1 June 2019
FW	Seon Ripley	23 March 1994 (age 32)	4	1	(Yorkshire) Hemsworth Miners Welfare	v. Somaliland, 4 May 2019 ^{WD}

== Head coach ==
Manager	Period	Played	Won	Drawn	Lost	Win %
(England) Ryan Farrell	2018-2022	8	5	1	2	62.5
(England) Paddy McGuire	2022	0	0	0	0	—
Totals		9	6	1	2	66.6

== See also ==
- Category:Footballers from Yorkshire
- Football in England
- English football league system
- Football records in England
- Yorkshire rugby league team
