= Josh Bragg =

English footballer

Personal information
- Date of birth: 30 July 1991 (age 35)
- Position: Midfielder

Senior career*
Years	Team	Apps	(Gls)
2013	Sandviks IK	40	(23)
2014	Umeå FC	17	(6)
2015	FC Linköping City	23	(11)
2016	Bodens BK		
2017	Dandenong Thunder		
2020–2022	Åtvidabergs FF	60	(13)

International career
- Kernow
- * Club domestic league appearances and goals

Joshua Bragg (born 30 July 1991) is an English footballer who last played as a midfielder for Åtvidabergs FF.

== Early life ==
Bragg was born in 1991 in Cornwall, England, before helping his clubs achieve three promotions as a footballer.

== Club career ==
Bragg started his career with Swedish side Sandviks IK, where he was regarded to have performed well for the club. In 2017, he signed for Australian side Dandenong Thunder. In 2020, he signed for Swedish side Åtvidabergs FF. However, he did not play for the club until the summer due to the coronavirus pandemic. He was regarded as an important player for the club.

== International career ==
Bragg played for the Kernow football team, where he was one of the few players on the team to have played professionally.

== Style of play ==
Bragg mainly operates as a midfielder and can operate as a defender. He is known for his free-kick taking ability.

== Personal life ==
Bragg is the son of Andrew Bragg, one of the founders of the Kernow football team.
