= Pat McGuire =

Pat McGuire may refer to:

- Pat McGuire (politician), member of the Illinois State Senate
- Patricia McGuire (born 1952), president of Trinity Washington University
- Pat McGuire (baseball) in 1988 Atlantic Coast Conference baseball tournament
- Pat McGuire (wrestler), see Future of Wrestling
- Pat McGuire (footballer), English footballer

== See also ==
- Patrick McGuire (disambiguation)
