= 2019 Atlantic Heritage Cup =

Tournament details
- Host country: Yorkshire
- Dates: 1 June – TBC 2019
- Teams: 3

Tournament statistics
- Matches played: 2
- Goals scored: 12 (6 per match)
- Top scorer(s): (Jersey) Tom Harris (Jersey) Kieran Lester (3 goals)

The 2019 Atlantic Heritage Cup was the first edition of the Atlantic Heritage Cup, and is a qualification tournament for the 2020 CONIFA World Football Cup in Skopje, North Macedonia. Yorkshire were announced in March 2019 as hosts, with Parishes of Jersey, Ellan Vannin and Kernow also originally set to participate. All 4 teams are either part of the United Kingdom, or are Crown dependencies. However, Ellan Vannin and Kernow both pulled out for undisclosed reasons, being replaced by Chagos Islands and reducing the tournament to a 3 team format.

== Format ==
The tournament is a round-robin, with each team playing each other once. This means a total of 3 games to be played over 3 days, at two stadiums (Ingfield Stadium, the home of Ossett United, and the CNG Stadium, home of Harrogate Town. The winner was due to be offered a place at the 2020 CONIFA World Football Cup, which in the event was cancelled due to the coronavirus pandemic.

== Standings ==
Pos	Team	Pld	W	D	L	GF	GA	GD	Pts
1	Parishes of Jersey	2	1	0	1	9	3	+6	3
2	Yorkshire (H)	1	1	0	0	1	0	+1	3
3	Chagos Islands	1	0	0	1	2	9	−7	0

Updated to match(es) played on 2 June 2019. Source:
Rules for classification: 1) Points; 2) Goal difference; 3) Number of goals scored;
(H) Hosts

All times are local.

== Results ==
1 June 2019
15:00 BST

Yorkshire	1–0	Parishes of Jersey
Litchfield 90+3'

Ingfield Stadium, Ossett
Attendance: 521
Referee: Karl Parker

2 June 2019
15:00 BST

Parishes of Jersey	9–2	Chagos Islands
Lester 5', 26', 41'; Hinds 7', 71'; Harris 52', 61', 67'; Watson 89'		Leelah 19', 21'

CNG Stadium, Harrogate
Referee: Chris Akers

TBC
TBC

Chagos Islands	v	Yorkshire

Ingfield Stadium, Ossett

== Top scorers ==
3 goals

- (Jersey) Tom Harris
- (Jersey) Kieran Lester

2 goals

- (Chagos Archipelago) Steven Leelah
- (Jersey) Karl Hinds

1 goal

- (Jersey) Luke Watson
- (Yorkshire) Brodie Litchfield

== Controversy ==
The decision by CONIFA to host the 2020 World Football Cup in Somaliland was met with criticism by some, with James Scott, the president of Parishes of Jersey FC, telling the Jersey Evening Post that he would not accept the place at the final tournament if his side won the Atlantic Heritage Cup. The comments were met with a backlash from CONIFA, who criticised inaccurate reporting and defended the decision to host the World Football Cup in Somaliland. The hosting of the 2020 World Football Cup was later transferred to Skopje, North Macedonia, with Parishes of Jersey and Chagos Islands due to participate, before the event was cancelled due to the coronavirus pandemic.
