= Sealand national football team =

Football team representing Sealand

Sealand
- Nickname: Seals
- Association: Sealand National Football Association (SNFA)
- Confederation: N.F.-Board (former)
- Captain: Ed Stubbs
- Most caps: Christian Gunn; Jack Field; Sam Churchman (8)
- Top scorer: Dan Hughes (6)
- Home stadium: Broadfield Stadium
- FIFA code: N/A
First colours	Second colours

First international
- Åland 2–2 Sealand (Åland; 15 May 2004)

Biggest win
- Raetia 1–6 Sealand (Chur, Switzerland; 9 August 2014)

Biggest defeat
- Occitania 8–0 Sealand (St John's, Isle of Man; 5 July 2013)

The Sealand national football team represents the unrecognized, self-proclaimed micronation of the Principality of Sealand. It is not a member of FIFA or UEFA, but is an associate member of the N.F.-Board, an organisation for teams who are not members of FIFA. They were admitted to the N.F.-Board as a provisional member in 2005 and as an associate member in 2006. The team has been inactive since 2014, although discussions are underway to revive the team as of April 2023, but this did not materialise. On August 7, 2026, Sealand announced the launch of Sealand International Football Club.

== History ==
Wey Court where Sealand played their first game after reforming in 2012 against the Chagos Islands national football team.

=== Foundation ===
The Sealand National Football Association (SNFA) was founded in 2003. In 2004, they played their first game against Åland drawing 2–2. All the players on the Sealand team were members of Vestbjerg Vintage Idrætsforening, a veterans side from Aalborg. However, the Danish-based SNFA ended their activities in 2006 and Sealand football took a break.

=== Recent times ===
On 23 December 2009, Scottish author Neil Forsyth was appointed head of the revived SNFA. He stated a goal of participation in the 2010 VIVA World Cup, a dream ultimately ended by a lack of finance. On 5 May 2012, Sealand took to the field against fellow N.F.-Board members the Chagos Islands at Weycourt in Godalming, Surrey. The Chagossians won 3–1, with Ryan Moore scoring for Sealand. The team was captained by former Bolton Wanderers defender Simon Charlton and actor Ralf Little.

Sealand played an away game against Alderney on 25 August 2012. After drawing the match by a scoreline of 1–1, Sealand won 5–4 on penalties. On 9 March 2013 Sealand won their first ever international when they beat Alderney 2–1 in Godalming.

Sealand competed in the Tynwald Hill Tournament on the Isle of Man in July 2013. The tournament was held at Mullen-e-Cloie, St John's. Following a late 5–3 defeat to Tamil Eelam and an 8–0 demolition at the hands of eventual winners Occitania, Sealand finished bottom of their group and went on to the 5th place playoff where they beat Alderney 2–1.

In February 2014, Sealand recorded their record win as they beat the Chagos Islands 4–2 in Godalming.

In May 2014, Sealand drew 1–1 with the Chagos Islands at Crawley Town a fortnight before another draw, 2–2 with Somaliland (who were making their non-FIFA debut) in London.

Sealand underwent a European tour for the first time in August 2014 which proved to be hugely successful. In Chur a record 6–1 win over Raetia saw Dan Hughes become the record-scorer with 4 goals, before a 3–2 win over Seborga in Ospedaletti, Italy. Hughes added to his tally in that game and the Seals extended their unbeaten international run to 6 games.

Sealand has not been a member of a confederation since the N.F.-Board abolished their member status. An application to join CONIFA was rejected.

== Overall record ==
Opponent	Pld	W	D*	L	GF	GA	% Won	% Drawn	% Lost
Åland	1	0	1	0	2	2	0%	100%	0%
Alderney	3	2	1	0	5	3	66.7%	33.33%	0%
Chagos Islands	3	1	1	1	6	6	33.33%	33.33%	33.33%
Raetia	1	1	0	0	6	1	100%	0%	0%
Seborga	1	1	0	0	3	2	100%	0%	0%
Somaliland	1	0	1	0	2	2	0%	100%	0%
Tamil Eelam	1	0	0	1	3	5	0%	0%	100%
Occitania	1	0	0	1	0	8	0%	0%	100%
Total	12	5	4	3	56	37	41.67%		

*Includes knockout matches decided on penalty kicks.

=== B team record ===
Opponent	Pld	W	D*	L	GF	GA	% Won	% Drawn	% Lost
Panjab	1	0	0	1	1	4	0%	0%	100%
Total	1	0	0	1	1	4	0%	0%	100%

*Includes knockout matches decided on penalty kicks.

== International results and upcoming fixtures ==
15 May 2004	Åland	2–2	Sealand	Åland, Finland

5 May 2012	Sealand	1–3	Chagos Islands	Godalming, England

25 August 2012	Alderney	1–1 (4–5 p)	Sealand	Saint Anne, Alderney

8 March 2013	Sealand	2–1	Alderney	Godalming, England

4 July 2013	Sealand	3–5	Tamil Eelam	St John's, Isle of Man

5 July 2013	Occitania	8–0	Sealand	St John's, Isle of Man

7 July 2013	Sealand	2–1	Alderney	St John's, Isle of Man

23 February 2014	Sealand	4–2	Chagos Islands	Godalming, England

5 May 2014	Chagos Islands	1–1 (4–3 p)	Sealand	Crawley, England

17 May 2014	Somaliland	2–2	Sealand	London, England

9 August 2014	Raetia	1–6	Sealand	Chur, Switzerland

10 August 2014	Seborga	2–3	Sealand	Ospedaletti, Italy

22 December 2014	Panjab	4–1	Sealand B	Smethwick, England

== Coaches ==
Manager	Nat	Span	G	W	D	L	GF	GA	Win %	Honours
Christian Olsen	(Denmark)	2003–2006	1	0	1	0	2	2	0%	
Neil Forsyth	(Scotland)	2009–2013	3	1	1	1	4	5	33.33%	
Julian Dicks	(England)	2013	3	1	0	2	5	14	33.33%	
Ed Stubbs	(Principality of Sealand)	2013–present	7	5	2	0	24	10	71.43%	

== Kit ==
Sealand's kit has the same colors as the flag of Sealand. Their original kit consisted of a red shirt with white trim, black shorts and white socks, and was provided by JJB with sponsorship from UK investment firm Property Secrets.

For the Tynwald Tournament, Sealand introduced a new Nike home kit, in red, with a white stripe down the right-hand side. In the 8–0 defeat to Occitania, Sealand debuted their Stanno away kit of a white shirt with pale red shorts.

== See also ==
- Sport in the Principality of Sealand
