= Patrick McGuire (solicitor) =

Scottish solicitor and solicitor advocate

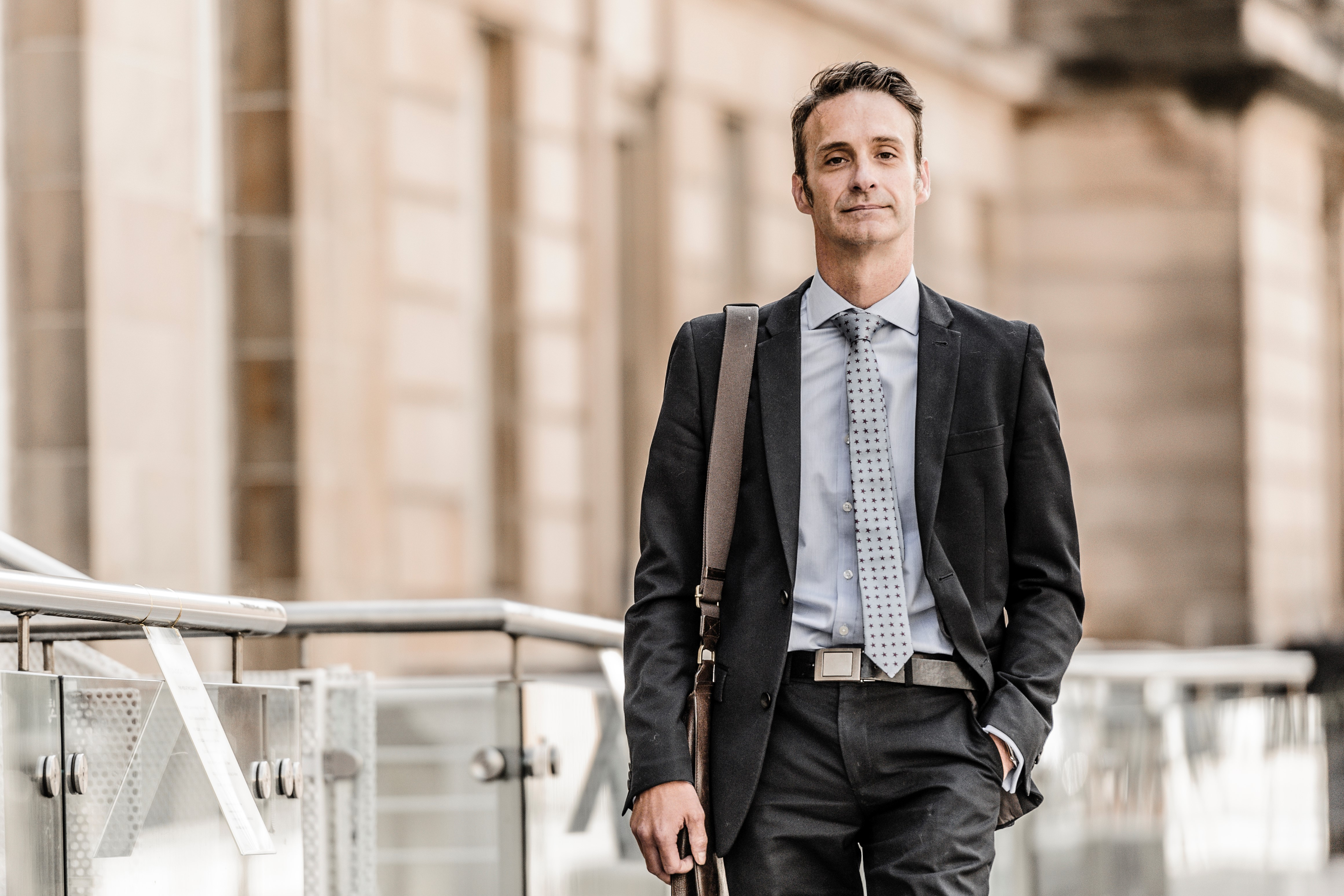
Patrick McGuire

Patrick McGuire is a Scottish solicitor and solicitor advocate. He is a partner with personal injury law firm Thompsons Solicitors Scotland.

He is known for his campaigning on issues relating to the rights of victims of accident and disease, including calling for and serving as the Recognised Legal Representative in three of the four Public inquiries held in Scotland since the Inquiries Act 2005 came into force: the ICL / Stockline Public Inquiry; the Vale of Leven Hospital Public Inquiry (C. difficile); and the Penrose Inquiry (infected blood products causing Hepatitis C and HIV). Other victim-related campaigns include PiP breast implants, DePuy hip replacements, cyclists injured as a result of Edinburgh's tram works and Edinburgh City Council's handling of babies ashes at Mortonhall Crematorium.

In 2005 his work with trade unions on corporate homicide led to him being appointed as the STUC's legal adviser to the panel of experts set up by the Justice Minister, Cathy Jamieson, to consider the issue of corporate killing in Scotland.

More recently McGuire has been involved in campaigning for a review of the civil justice system in Scotland and reform of Scotland's Fatal Accident Inquiry system.

He also serves on the Law Society of Scotland’s Access to Justice Committee.

== Notable cases ==
- Patrick Davidson v. Lothian & Borders Fire Brigade established that, despite the need to ensure that fire-fighters are properly and fully trained, fire-fighters still have the same rights under the health and safety legislation as any other employee.
- Clement v. Scottish Ambulance Service and Skinner v. Scottish Ambulance Service established that use of traditional needles by branches of the NHS could be considered a breach of the country's health and safety legislation.
- McFarlane v. Scottish Borders Council involved a road worker who was building a passing place and suffered injury when his vehicle rolled down a steep embankment. The case tested the parameters of the Construction (Health, Safety and Welfare) Regulations 1996 and the Provision and Use of Work Equipment Regulations 1998.
- McGowan v. W & JR Watson Ltd. involved a band saw operating accident in which the claimant injured his hand. The defender's position was that the guard was functioning as it should have been, but McGuire argued that the regulations state dangerous parts must be guarded and there was strict liability in this regard.

McFarlane and McGowan went to the Scottish appeal court, the Inner House of the Court of Session, and established that employers must do everything that is reasonably practicable to avoid risk and to safeguard employees. McGowan was notable as a prima facie case, whereby the employer had to prove they did everything possible to keep their employee safe. McGuire demonstrated to the court that the employer did not and therefore the appeal was upheld.

In McFarlane, the judge in the first instance dismissed the claim and found the claimant to be 75 per cent negligent. At the Inner House, the court upheld the appeal and "interfered" with the contributory negligence ruling, reducing this factor to 25 per cent. This was significant, as typically the Inner House takes the first instance ruling as "matter of fact"; however, McGuire demonstrated the flawed nature of the initial ruling.

== Mass wrongs ==
Patrick works on behalf of groups of people who have collectively experienced wrongs and injustices. He has spent much of his later legal career working on public inquiries and mass litigations as noted below.

=== Public inquiries ===
In 2005, Patrick campaigned for a full public inquiry to be set up into the Stockline Plastics factory explosion. He worked with the families of those killed and injured, and alongside Patricia Ferguson (former MSP, Glasgow Maryhill), Ann McKechin (former MP, Glasgow Maryhill) and with the Scottish Trades Union Congress. Out of the six public inquiries which have taken place in Scotland up to 2021, Patrick has been the Recognised Legal Representative in four:

- Stockline /ICL Joint Public Inquiry (commenced 2004)
- The Penrose Inquiry (infected blood products causing Hepatitis C and HIV) (commenced 2009)
- The Vale of Leven Hospital Public Inquiry (C-difficile) (commenced 2009)
- The Scottish Hospitals Inquiry (ongoing – Queen Elizabeth University Hospital, Glasgow and Royal Hospital for Children and Young People, Edinburgh) (commenced 2020)

In the Vale of Leven Public Inquiry he worked closely with family groups and Jackie Baillie (MSP). Throughout the Penrose Inquiry, and onwards into the Infected Blood Inquiry, he worked closely with the Haemophilia Society.

=== Infected blood inquiry ===
Patrick is the Recognised Legal Representative to more than 300 Core Participants at the Infected Blood Inquiry which commenced in 2018, three years after the conclusion of the Penrose Inquiry in Scotland.

While Penrose was the first statutory inquiry, its powers and terms of reference were limited. The subsequent Infected Blood Inquiry is a UK-wide investigation which will also re-examine what happened to patients in Scotland who were infected with Hepatitis C and HIV through contaminated blood products. Patrick served on the Contaminated Blood Financial Review Group which resulted in a significantly increased financial support package for victims of the contaminated blood scandal through the newly created Scottish Infected Blood Support Scheme (SIBSS)

=== Mass litigation ===
Patrick campaigns on issues relating to the rights of victims of accidents and disease and has represented mass litigants in the following issues:

- PiP breast implants
- DePuy hip replacements
- Cyclists injured as a result of Edinburgh's tram works
- Edinburgh City Council’s handling of baby ashes at MortonHall Crematorium (which has subsequently led to claims throughout Scotland.)
- Vaginal mesh implants
- Clutha public house helicopter crash

=== Scotland's first Group Proceedings Litigation – Volkswagen emissions claims ===
Following the introduction of the Civil Litigation (Expenses and Group Proceedings) (Scotland) Act 2018, Patrick lobbied the Scottish Civil Justice Council for the introduction of Rules relating to group actions. The new Rules under the Act came into force in August 2021 and introduced the statutory framework for formal group actions to be heard in Scotland. Such actions mean that groups of claimants, all suffering the same wrong, can act as one group, thereby streamlining the litigation process.

Under the Act, Patrick was the first solicitor in Scotland to bring a 'class-style' group action claim to court – he is lead solicitor in the VW NOx Emissions claim in which Thompsons is representing more than 2,000 claimants.

=== Work with survivors of historical child abuse ===
From 2015, Patrick began working with survivors of historical child abuse.

In May 2017 the first hearing in the Scottish Child Abuse Inquiry heard apologies from more than 60 organisations which had run children's homes and institutions across Scotland including Quarrier's, Daughters of Charity of St Vincent de Paul, Sisters of Nazareth, Good Shepherd Sisters, De La Salle Brothers and Christian Brothers. Patrick attended the hearing and was pictured with survivors who had gathered for a vigil outside Rosebery House before the inquiry started.

On 4 October 2017, the time bar preventing survivors of historic abuse from taking civil legal action against the perpetrators was lifted. Patrick and the Survivors Team from Thompsons Solicitors Scotland are now in the process of representing survivors of child abuse across Scotland and from a number of different settings. The team represented survivors who were abused by Celtic Boys' Club founder Jim Torbett and former youth coach Frank Cairney who have both been convicted and imprisoned for their crimes. Patrick has campaigned for the Scottish Football Association to take responsibility for their failings in this and other matters relating to historical child abuse.

In 2022, Lord Arthurson granted 22 former Celtic Boys Club players the right to launch a group action lawsuit against Celtic FC in respect of the historical child abuse. Patrick McGuire and Thompsons Solicitors in Scotland are representing the survivors. He told the Glasgow Times that this was a "watershed moment". The news of the group action claim saw more former Celtic Boys Club players to come forward to tell of the abuse they suffered in the past.

== Trade unions ==
In 2005, due in part to the notoriety generated by his work with trade unions on corporate homicide, he was appointed as the STUC's legal adviser to the panel of experts set up by the Justice Minister, Cathy Jamieson, to consider the issue of corporate killing in Scotland. When Labour and SNP stated opposition to the UK Government's Trade Union Bill, McGuire spoke out against Presiding Officer Tricia Marwick and her decision to reject a motion letting Holyrood block the Bill in Scotland.

In 2021, he worked alongside "Scotland's biggest unions to represent workers" in the aftermath of the coronavirus pandemic, representing those whose employers failed to protect them from COVID-19 in the course of their employment.

== Official roles and charity work ==
McGuire is on the board of directors for Wellbeing Scotland and fully supports the Charity's work.

As a campaigning lawyer, McGuire has supported Scottish Hazards in their work seeking justice for bereaved families whose loved ones died in occupational accidents.

He also supports and works with Show Racism the Red Card and is a Treasurer/Trustee/Director of Bo'ness United JFC (Bo'ness Athletic Football Club).
