= DePuy Synthes =

Orthopaedic company

Johnson & Johnson Medtech
- Type: Subsidiary
- Industry: Medical equipment
- Founded: 1895; 131 years ago
- Founders: Revra DePuy
- Headquarters: 325 Paramount Drive, Raynham, Massachusetts, U.S.
- Area served: Worldwide
- Key people: Namal Nawana (Worldwide President), Michael M. Schulman (CFO)
- Products: Replacement knees, hips, biomaterials, spine
- Parent: Johnson & Johnson Medtech
- Website: depuysynthes.com

DePuy Synthes (/dəˈpjuː/) is a franchise of orthopaedic and neurosurgery companies. Acquired by Johnson & Johnson in 1998, its companies form part of the Johnson & Johnson MedTech business segment. DePuy develops and markets products under the Codman, DePuy Mitek, DePuy Orthopaedics and DePuy Spine brands.

DePuy Orthopaedics designs, manufactures, markets and distributes products for reconstructing damaged or diseased joints and for repairing and reconstructing traumatic skeletal injuries. DePuy Spine products facilitate fusion of the spine and correction of spinal deformities, preserving motion of the spine and repairing bone fractures.

DePuy is now operating from several countries, including the United Kingdom, Japan, France, Germany, Ireland and Australia. In many other countries, DePuy operates as a brand under the Johnson & Johnson Medical organization.

DePuy is currently the subject of more than 11,000 lawsuits related to its recall of faulty hip replacement systems, which lawyers and industry analysts estimate will cost parent company Johnson & Johnson billions of dollars to resolve.

== History ==
Founded 1895 in Warsaw, Indiana, by Revra DePuy, DePuy Manufacturing began designing and building fiber splints to replace wooden barrel staves that were used to set fractures.

When DePuy died in 1921, his widow Winifred Stoner took over and remarried Herschel Leiter who would become president of the company. When Stoner died in 1949, Leiter remarried Amrette Webb Ailes and shortly died in 1950. Amrette Leiter married Harry Hoopes and jointly ran DePuy until 1965.

In 1968, Bio-Dynamics acquired DePuy Manufacturing and then in 1974 sold the company to Boehringer Mannheim, a subsidiary of Corange. Boehringer Mannheim acquired Thackray in 1990 and ACE Medical in 1994 and placed them within the DePuy arm. In 1998, DePuy acquired AcroMed for $325 million and was renamed DePuy AcroMed.

On April 22, 2008, the DePuy franchise and Johnson & Johnson Medical marked the official opening of Johnson & Johnson Medical (Suzhou), Ltd., establishing production facilities in China for DePuy and the J&J Family of Companies. At 120,000 square feet (11,000 m^{2}), this facility occupies a fraction of the J&J campus, which encompasses 69 acres (280,000 m^{2}) in total. Manufacturing at JJM began in February 2008.

On August 24, 2010, DePuy recalled all ASR hip implant systems sold since 2003. The 2010 DePuy Hip Recall was issued after research released by the National Joint Registry (NJR) found high rates of hip replacement failure for the ASR XL Acetabular and ASR Hip Resurfacing systems. Another study noted the high rate of failure in patients who received ASR XL hip arthroplasty.

In August 2013, attorneys for thousands of patients who received the implants sent a letter to the Food and Drug Administration accusing the company of breaking federal law by hiding experts’ misgivings about the device, and called on the agency to investigate. “We believe almost all of these injuries would have been avoided had DePuy complied with the reporting requirements and informed your agency about the adverse events and concerns about the safety of the ASR which came to the company’s attention,” the attorneys said.

DePuy faces more than 11,000 plaintiffs nationwide over the ASR XL, which generally allege that the product is prone to degrading prematurely and shedding toxic metal debris, causing pain and necessitating revision surgeries that can be more invasive than the initial total hip replacements. In the first trial related to the product, a California jury awarded $8.3 million in compensatory damages to a retired prison guard, finding the implant's design to be faulty and DePuy to have acted negligently. A judge later upheld the jury verdict on post-trial motions. In the second trial, an Illinois jury returned a verdict in favor of DePuy in a lawsuit brought by a nurse who had sought $5 million in damages.

On June 14, 2012, Johnson & Johnson completed the acquisition of Synthes, which was integrated with the DePuy franchise to establish the DePuy Synthes Companies of Johnson & Johnson. Subsequently, the company's logo changed from its previous characteristic red-dot. In 2017, Codman Neurosurgery, part of Depuy Synthes, was acquired by medical device maker Integra LifeSciences for $1.045 billion.

On September 14, 2023, Johnson & Johnson announced its MedTech and pharmaceutical segments were uniting under the Johnson & Johnson brand name.

On October 14, 2025, Johnson & Johnson announced the planned divestiture of DePuy Synthes over the following 18–24 months.

== Operating companies ==
- Codman & Shurteff, Inc.
- DePuy Mitek, Inc.
- DePuy Orthopaedics, Inc.
- DePuy Spine, Inc
