= Paddy Maguire =

Paddy Maguire may refer to:

- Paddy Maguire (Shameless), a character on the TV series Shameless
- Paddy Maguire (boxer) (born 1948), former bantamweight boxer from Northern Ireland

== See also ==
- Paddy McGuire (1884–1923), actor
- Patrick Maguire (disambiguation)
