= Revra DePuy =

American inventor

- Born: 22 March 1860; Grand Rapids, Michigan
- Died: 9 October 1921 (aged 61); Warsaw, Indiana

Revra DePuy (March 22, 1860 – October 9, 1921), was an American inventor, noted for his invention of the fiber splint. He was the founder of DePuy Manufacturing, now part of Johnson and Johnson (J&J).

== Biography ==
DePuy was born in Grand Rapids, Michigan, where his father was a lawyer, but the family moved to Canada when Revra was a child. After his father died, Revra's mother moved the family to Marseilles, Illinois.

As a young man, DePuy supported himself by doing many kinds of work. He worked as a clerk in a drug store, and then studied chemistry at the University of Toronto, where he received a degree. After college, he invented a technique for sugar coating pills.

Later, he worked as a traveling salesman. DePuy settled in Warsaw, Indiana, and decided to make a fiber splint to replace the wooden barrel splints which were used back then to set bone fractures. DePuy Manufacturing became the first commercial orthopedic manufacturer in the world. The company operated out of the Hayes Hotel in Warsaw from 1895 - 1901.

On March 9, 1896, he married Miss Winifred Stoner, who was the daughter of the sheriff of Kosciusko County. Their marriage was childless.

DePuy moved the manufacturing site to Niles, Michigan, from 1901 to 1904, then moved back to Warsaw, Indiana after sales slumped. At that point, he built a factory at the corner of Columbia and Center streets in Warsaw, where the company made "fracture appliances" from 1904 to 1925. In 1905, J.O. Zimmer began working for DePuy as the first sales representative. Zimmer later left DePuy and founded Zimmer Holdings.

DePuy died of heart disease aged 61, on October 9, 1921, in Warsaw, Indiana. His wife later married Herschel Leiter, who then became president of DePuy Manufacturing.
