= 2010 DePuy Hip Recall =

Recall of hip replacement implants

The 2010 DePuy Hip Replacement Recall was instituted when DePuy Orthopaedics, Inc., a division of Johnson & Johnson, recalled its ASR XL Acetabular metal-on-metal hip replacement system on August 24, 2010.

== Background ==
The recall came after data from a study indicated that the five year failure rate of this product is approximately 13%, or 1 in 8 patients. Even if the defective device is replaced, it can leave behind dangerous, possibly deadly fragments that may not be discovered for years. DePuy identified reasons for the failure of the hip replacement system as component loosening, component malalignment, infection, fracture of the bone, dislocation, metal sensitivity and pain. Additional complications from the hip replacement system may include increased metal ion levels in the blood, bone staining, necrosis, swelling, nerve damage, tissue damage and/or muscle damage.

At the beginning of 2011, DePuy Orthopaedics said they were phasing out the ASR Hip Implant because of declining sales, but never mentioned the high failure rate data from an Australian implant registry. In March 2011, The New York Times reported that DePuy issued its first warning to doctors and patients about the high early failure rate. However, at this point, they still had not issued a recall of the product. In fact, they claimed any statements referencing a recall were false.

=== Lawsuits ===
About 93,000 persons worldwide received an ASR implant.

Shine Lawyers commenced an Australian class action in the Federal Court of Australia on September 27, 2011, against DePuy International Pty Ltd and Johnson and Johnson Medical Pty Ltd. Both lawsuits claimed that the DePuy ASR hip replacement was defectively designed, that DePuy knew that there were problems with the implant early on but did not do anything to let patients or their surgeons know about the possible problems.

==== United States ====
The first lawsuit in the United States against DePuy Orthopaedics was filed on June 15, 2010.

Through the multidistrict litigation process, the cases were centralized in different courts depending on the exact implant at issue. The United States Judicial Panel on Multidistrict Litigation (JPML) issued a ruling on December 7, 2010 that determined the fate of the United States lawsuits relating to the ASR XL Acetabular Hip System implants. Its ruling stated that all cases filed across the country "are transferred to the Northern District of Ohio and, with the consent of that court, assigned to the Honorable David A. Katz for coordinated or consolidated pretrial proceedings." On January 26, 2011, Judge Katz entered an order in the multidistrict litigation naming the leadership counsel for both the plaintiffs and the defendants. Ben Gordon, Eric Kennedy, Ellen Relkin, Mark Robinson, Christopher Seeger, and Steven Skikos were named on the plaintiffs' Executive Committee. Robert Tucker and Susan Sharko were named as defendants' Co-Lead Counsel.

In 2013, Johnson & Johnson announced that it would pay $2.5 billion to settle claims related to the ASR XL implants globally. Johnson & Johnson retained an option to withdraw the settlement if too few claimants signed up, but in May 2014 it announced it would not withdraw the global settlement. Settlements began at a base of $250,000. Johnson & Johnson continued to deny culpability.

==== Pinnacle implant litigation ====
On May 24, 2011, the JPML centralized all cases relating to the Pinnacle Acetabular Cup System in the Northern District of Texas before judge James E. Kinkeade.

The Pinnacle litigation centralized in the Northern District of Texas proceeded to a series of bellwether trials for selected plaintiffs from different states. In a first trial with a single Montana plaintiff, the jury found for DePuy. In a second trial with five Texas plaintiffs, the jury awarded $502 million to the plaintiffs, consisting of $142 million in actual damages and $360 million in punitive damages. The judge reduced this to a total judgment of $151 million based on the Texas limitation on punitive damages. In a third trial with six California plaintiffs, the jury awarded $1.04 billion to the plaintiffs, consisting of $30 million in actual damages and over $1 billion in punitive damages.

== India ==
Of the total number of people receiving the implants, about 4,700 were in India. As of 2018, J&J committed to working with the Indian government to support all Indian ASR patients. In late 2018, an Indian government report, the accuracy of which has been disputed by J&J, proposed that each patient who had a faulty implant should receive a lump sum payment of ₹2 million (US$27,812). J&J had previously provided US$2.25 million to cover diagnostic and surgical costs to patients with defective implants, but the Indian government was concerned that these monies included no compensatory funds.
