= Alamzey Stadium =

Football stadium in Burao, Somaliland

- Interactive map of Alamzey Stadium
- Full name: Alamzey Stadium
- Location: Burao, Somaliland
- Coordinates: 9.51730°N 45.54030°E
- Owner: Public
- Capacity: 8,000
- Surface: Artificial turf
- Field size: 95 m × 60 m (312 ft × 197 ft)

Construction
- Built: October 1982 – December 1985
- Opened: 1986
- Renovated: 2018

Tenant
- Togdheer Regional Team (2011–present)

Alamzey Stadium (Somali: Garoonka Kubadda Cagta Alamzey) is a football stadium in Burao, Somaliland. It has been the home stadium of the Togdheer Regional Team since 2011.

It is the largest stadium in Burao and the third largest in Somaliland.

== See also ==
- Hargeisa Stadium
- Ministry of Youth and Sports (Somaliland)
- List of stadiums in Africa
- Somaliland national football team
