= Hassan Mohamed Abdulle =

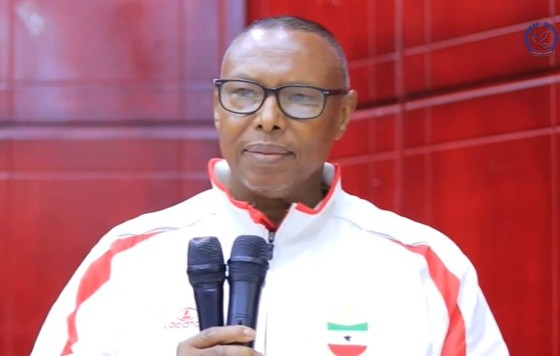

Personal information
- Native name: Xasan Maxamed Cabdulle
- Other names: Hassan Warabe Adde
- Born: 1958 (age 67–68) Near Hargeisa, Somaliland
- Occupation: Sports administrator

Hassan (Haji) Mohamed Abdulle (Somali: Xasan (Xaaji) Maxamed Cabdulle; born 1958), widely known as Hassan Warabe Adde (Somali: Xasan Waraabe Cadde or Cade), is a Somaliland sports administrator and advisor. He is best known for serving as the chairman of the Somaliland Olympic Committee from 2013 to 2015. He has also worked as a sports advisor to the mayor of Hargeisa. As of 2016, he was living in Norway.

== Biography ==
In 1958, Hassan was born in the countryside north of Hargeisa. He belongs to the Sa'ad Musa sub-clan of the Habr Awal clan of the Isaaq clan.

His father moved to Mogadishu, the capital of Somalia, and Hassan and his family soon joined him there. At the time, Hassan played football, basketball, and running at the 21 October School (the name is derived from Somalia's Revolution Day.) When he retired, he vowed to use his knowledge and experience to help the younger generation.

In 1992, Hassan first visited Hargeisa. From then on, whenever he visited Somaliland, Hassan would deliver sports equipment to local sports teams.

In October 2012, Hassan participated in a charity event in Hargeisa where a local company, AL-NUUR Furniture, donated clothes and shoes to 480 orphans. During the event, he praised the company's generous donation and encouraged other businesses to follow their example and support orphaned children in the community.

In February 2013, President Silanyo honored 100 personalities who contributed to Somaliland's development since its 1991 separation from Somalia, and Hassan was recognized as one of the two individuals in the Sports Development category.

=== Chairman of the Somaliland Olympic Committee ===
In December 2013, Hassan Warabe Adde was appointed chairman of the Somaliland Olympic Committee. Six other members, including a vice chairman and a secretary general, were appointed at the same time. The committee had a transitional term of one and a half years, and its duties included preparing various laws to govern sports in the country, preparing elections for various sports associations, establishing relations with all international organizations working in sports, and promoting and improving the quality of various sports in the country.

In June 2014, Hassan attended the official opening of the rebuilt Xawaadle Stadium in Hargeisa. As the chairman of the National Olympic Committee, he stated that the stadium was good but its measurements needed to be corrected. He also stressed the importance of installing artificial turf at the venue.

In June 2014, Hassan called for a football carpet to be laid at Hargeisa Stadium within the year.

In December 2014, Hassan presented a trophy to Somaliland President Ahmed Mohamed Mohamoud Silanyo at the presidential palace. This award honored the president's role in encouraging the country's youth. The president thanked Hassan and promised that his government would continue supporting and encouraging young people in Somaliland.

In December 2014, Hassan spoke at a press conference in Hargeisa against clan divisions. He expressed worry that young people were being drawn back into tribalism. Citing former President Egal, he urged politicians to work together and focus on the development and unity of their community and Somaliland.

In October 2015, Hassan contacted FIFA to help them follow the Somaliland regional football tournament. He planned to provide a link from the sports website Cadalool.com so FIFA officials could watch the matches online. He also announced that two referees from Europe would arrive to officiate the tournament games.

In November 2015, Hassan announced his resignation as chairman of the Somaliland Olympic Committee through the media. It is said that the reason for this is that Hassan refuses to engage in discussions with the other committee members.

=== Former chairman of the Somaliland Olympic Committee ===
In May 2016, a football team from Somaliland participated in the CONIFA World Football Cup held in Abkhazia for unrecognized countries. Hassan, who served as the sports advisor to the mayor of Hargeisa and was the former chairman of the Somaliland Olympic Committee, gave an interview about the tournament.

In May 2016, the Somaliland Minister of Sports criticized Hassan for still claiming to be the chairman of the Somaliland Olympic Committee. After that, Hassan released a press statement responding to criticisms from the Ministry of Sports. He stated that he had previously resigned as chairman of the Somaliland National Olympic Committee due to corruption in the ministry. He also supported the Somaliland football team competing in the 2016 CONIFA World Football Cup in Abkhazia.

In December 2016, when the president replaced the Somaliland Minister of Sports, Hassan welcomed the change, stating that the former minister had been overwhelmed by the vast responsibilities of the ministry and the vision to guide the youth toward a better future had been lost.

In May 2018, Somaliland was excluded from the CONIFA World Football Cup in London. Players also criticized the Ministry of Sports for its negligence in failing to help the team participate. Hassan, the former chairman of the Somaliland Olympic Committee, noted that another country had taken their place.

In November 2023, Hassan gave a speech about developing and modernizing sports in Somaliland. He reviewed the history of sports since the British colonial period and emphasized that sports protect young people from crime and drug abuse. To support the youth, he proposed building a sports system centered on school education, urging the government to protect physical education classes, create school tournaments, and promote running and women's sports. Hassan also stressed the need for strict discipline, fair play, and modern management in sports organizations. He demanded an end to violence and cheating, reminding everyone to respect referees and prevent fan trouble at stadiums. Finally, he mentioned the successful installation of artificial turf in stadiums across Hargeisa, Berbera, Borama, and Gabiley, calling for continued infrastructure growth to bring peace and unity to the country.
