= Hargeisa Stadium =

Multi-sports stadium in Somaliland

- Interactive map of Hargeisa Stadium
- Full name: Hargeisa Stadium
- Location: Hargeisa, Somaliland
- Coordinates: 9°32′58″N 44°3′45″E
- Capacity: 30,000
- Surface: Artificial turf

Construction
- Renovated: 2015

Hargeisa Stadium, also known as Hargeysa National Stadium, is a multi-sports stadium and is used mostly for football matches and currently serves as the home of Somaliland national football team.

== See also ==
- Somaliland national football team
- Ministry of Youth and Sports (Somaliland)
- Alamzey Stadium
