= Chagos Islands national football team =

Men's association football team

Chagos Islands
- Association: Chagos Football Association
- Confederation: World Unity Football Alliance
First colours	Second colours

First international
- Chagos Islands 6–1 Raetia (Crawley, England; 4 December 2011)

Biggest win
- Chagos Islands 6–1 Raetia (Crawley, England; 4 December 2011)

Biggest defeat
- Ellan Vannin 14–0 Chagos Islands (London, England; 13 August 2017)

ConIFA World Football Cup
- Appearances: 1 (first in 2016)
- Best result: 12th, 2016

The Chagos Islands national football team is a football team representing the Chagos Archipelago in the Indian Ocean. However, this area, which falls under the administration of the British Indian Ocean Territory, is uninhabited save for the presence of a US military base on the island of Diego Garcia and the few Islanders who resettled on Île du Coin, after the United Kingdom evicted the local population between 1967 and 1973. As a consequence, the team in fact represents the Chagossian diaspora around the world.

They were led by Sussex-based manager Jimmy Ferrar until June 2024 when a number of players expressed a desire to play under the British Indian Ocean Territory name, leading to a split and two separate teams under different names representing the territory.

== History ==
=== Union Chagossiene de Football years ===
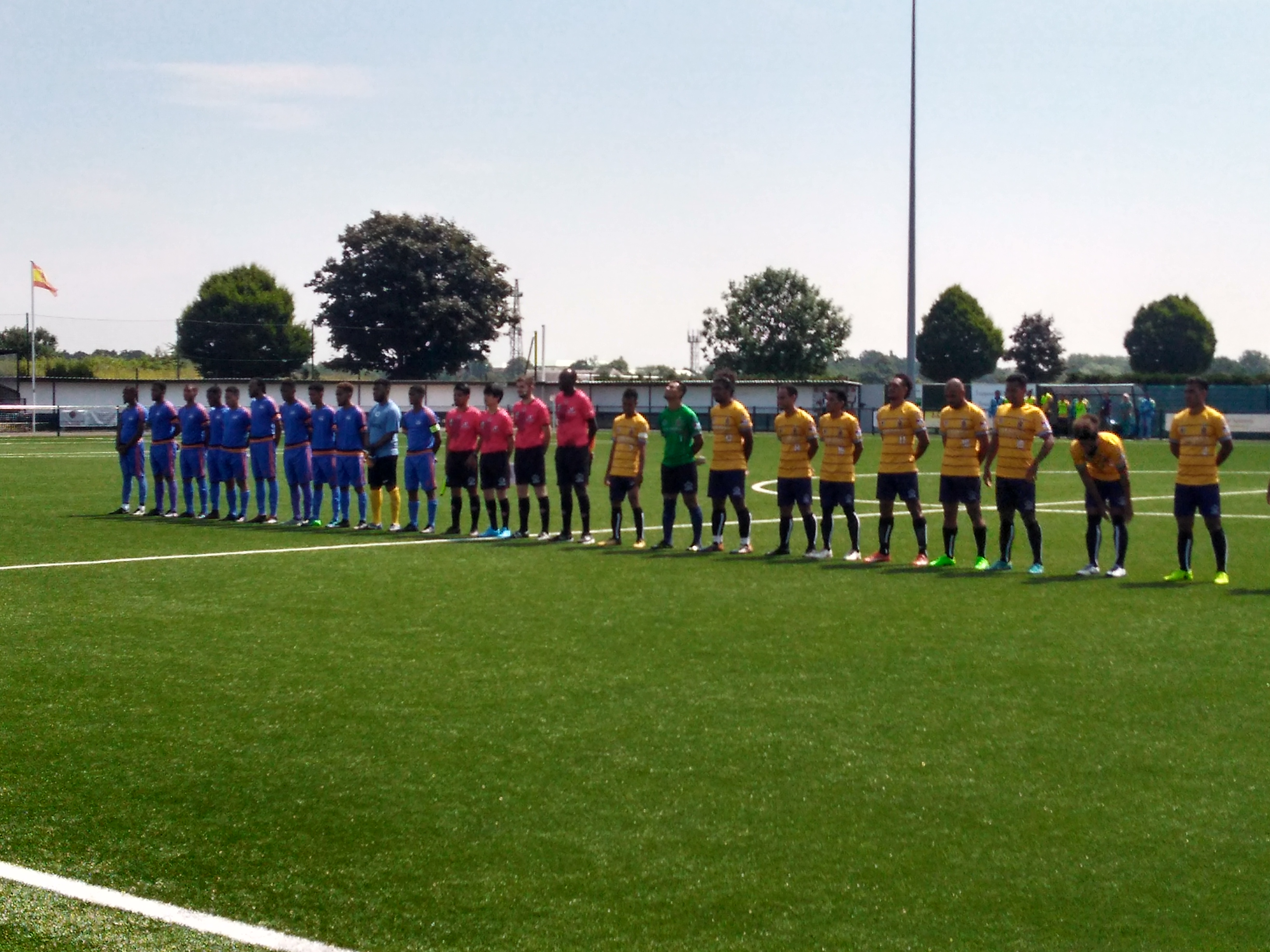
Chagos Islands and Tuvalu line up before their match in June 2018

In 2004, following the granting of Chagossians living in the UK the right to apply for a British passport, a group of islanders living near Crawley in West Sussex founded a governing body for football among their community, and the wider worldwide Chagossian diaspora, with a view to forming a national team. This resulted in the formation of the Union Chagossiene de Football, which joined the N.F.-Board, an international body for national football teams unable to join FIFA, in 2005. Amongst the activities the UCF undertook was organizing a club side, Chagos Islands F.C., which played in the Crawley and District Football League until it was disbanded in 2010. With no immediate UK domestic outlet for their players to play, the UCF attempted to promote the side in the international arena, attempting to take a team to the 2010 Viva World Cup in Gozo. However, owing to the association's financial situation, and the wholly amateur status of the players, this was not possible. Attempts to reform the club side in another local league in Sussex also failed, leading to the team training regularly, but not playing.

In December 2011, a friendly was finally arranged with the Raetia football team, another member of the N.F.-Board, who not only came to the UK, but also brought a full set of kit for the Chagossian team to use. The game was played at the ground of Oakwood F.C., for whom Chagossian straker Mervin Bhujan was a player, and who arranged use of the stadium, and led to a 6–1 victory for the Chagos Islands. This led to hopes that the team would be able to participate more fully in N.F.-Board events, but lack of finances again meant this was to prove impossible.

In May 2012, a second match was organized, this time against Sealand. This was a first "away" game for the Chagossians, played at the home of Godalming Town F.C. in Surrey, which was used by Sealand for their home games, and resulted in a second consecutive win for the Chagos Islands. However, in spite of successfully staging a pair of games, the UCF was forced to fold.

=== Chagos Football Association years ===
In February 2013, a new organization, the Chagos Football Association, was formed by Sabrina Jean and others to continue the management of the Chagos team. The first match organized under the new body was a game against Sealand, taking place in February 2014 at Godalming, and which saw the Chagossians suffer their first defeat. A third game was quickly organized, this time taking place at the home of Crawley Town F.C., in May 2014, ending in a 1–1 draw.

In February 2014, around the same time as playing their second fixture against Sealand, the CFA joined ConIFA, in an attempt to find more regular games. The team played its first official fixture against another member of ConIFA when they turned out for a game against Somaliland in London in November 2014, again ending in a 1–1 draw. In 2015, the CFA announced its intention to attempt to qualify to participate in its first tournament, the ConIFA World Football Cup, via ConIFA's recently announced qualification process, by participating in a tournament hosted by Raetia, the Benedikt Fontana Cup. Originally planned as a three-team tournament, this altered into a two-legged play-off between the hosts and the Chagossians. However, just before the tie was due to take place, the Chagossians were forced to withdraw. This did not stop the ambition of the CFA to participate, with a fundraising effort to help the team make it to the 2016 tournament in Abkhazia announced in October 2015. To this end, the team played another friendly against Panjab in December 2015, which saw the team suffer its heaviest defeat 4–1.

In January 2016, the Chagos Islands were announced as one of the 12 participants in the 2016 World Football Cup. The opportunity to participate in a first ever overseas tournament led to a drive to raise the money necessary to allow the team to make the journey to Abkhazia. The Chagos Islands were successful in raising the necessary funds and took part in the 2016 ConIFA World Football Cup, however the team failed to win a single game and suffer 2 of their biggest defeats in the group stage, 9–0 loss to Panjab and 12–0 loss to Western Armenia, the team subsequently lost 3–2 to Somaliland and lost on penalties to Raetia after drawing 3–3 in their final game of the tournament.

Following the 2016 World Football Cup the Chagos Islands participated in the World Unity Cup, originally organised by Darfur United, who later withdrew, the Chagos Islands would play 3 games in total against Barawa, recording their first victory since 2012, 3–2 in the opening game, before losing two games against Tamil Eelam, both 5–1, with all games played at Gander Green Lane, home of Sutton United FC.

In 2017, the Chagos Islands participated in the Niamh Challenge Cup, organised by Ellan Vannin, for a place in the 2018 CONIFA World Football Cup. The Chagos Islands would play two games, losing both to Barawa, 3–0, and Ellan Vannin, 14–0. This meant the team failed to qualify for the 2018 CONIFA World Football Cup hosted by Barawa in London.

In 2018, the Chagos Islands played friendly fixtures against new CONIFA members Yorkshire and Barawa, losing both games. Following the sudden withdrawal of Ellan Vannin partway through the 2018 CONIFA World Football Cup after a controversial decision of the inclusion of an alleged ineligible player the Chagos Islands played two friendlies against Matabeleland and Tuvalu.

In early 2019, the Chagos Islands played a friendly against the county of Surrey, recording their first win since 2016, a 3–2 victory over the hosts in Merstham. Following losses to Cascadia, Parishes of Jersey and Kernow the team appointed Jimmy Ferrar as their new manager. Ferrar has previously managed at Oakwood, Crawley Down and Alfold where he won the Southern Combination Div 1 for season 2018/19.

The Chagos Islands would go on to play a number of games over the final months of 2019, a Yorkshire-based charity team, local non-FIFA side Surrey, and Panjab. Like teams across the world the Chagos Islands were unable to play in 2020 due to the COVID-19 pandemic and were unable to participate in the 2020 CONIFA World Football Cup in North Macedonia.

In July 2020, the Chagos Islands were announced as co-founding members of the World Unity Football Alliance a new governing body of non-FIFA international football. and were later announced as participants of the inaugural WUFA World Series hosted by International Surrey Football and played behind closed doors in May 2021 at Merrist Wood College, near Guildford in Surrey.

The team would record a 3–1 semi-final victory over hosts Surrey before a 2–2 draw in the final against Barawa saw the game being decided by penalties. The Chagos Islands won 5–4 on penalties to claim their first-ever piece of silverware.

In 2023 the Chagos Islands hosted the Falklands on their way to participate in the 2023 Island Games, winning 4–0 in Reigate.

=== Chagos Islands (BIOT) team ===
Chagos Islands (BIOT)
- Association: Chagos Islands BIOT Football Association

First international
- British Indian Ocean Territory 4–2 Surrey (Dorking, England; 9 June 2024)

Biggest win
- British Indian Ocean Territory 1–0 British Medical (Reigate, England; 7 July 2024)

Biggest defeat
- Cornwall 5–2 British Indian Ocean Territory (Liskeard, England; 13 August 2017)

In June 2024, the Chagos Islands players decided to align the team with the British Indian Ocean Territory as opposed to the Chagos Islands. The team played its first game under the new "Chagos Islands (BIOT)" name against Surrey, losing 4-2. In July 2024 they played a match against Kernow, losing 5–2. Jimmy Ferrar was the manager. The team's home kit features the Flag of the British Indian Ocean Territory.

== Notable players ==
- Robert Cullen
- Damien Ramsamy

== Tournament record ==
=== CONIFA World Football Cup ===
Year	Position	P	W	D	L	F	A
ConIFA World Football Cup
(Sápmi) 2014	did not enter						
(Abkhazia) 2016	12th	4	0	1	3	5	27
(Barawa) 2018	did not qualify						
Total	Best: 12th	4	0	1	3	5	27

=== WUFA World Series ===
WUFA World Series
Year	Position	P	W	D	L	GF	GC
2021	1st	2	1	1	0	5	3
Total	Best: 1st	2	1	1	0	5	3

== International results ==
Win Draw Loss

=== 2011 ===
4 December 2011 Friendly	Chagos Islands	6–1	Raetia	Tinsley Lane, Crawley

=== 2012 ===
9 May 2012 Friendly	Sealand	1–3	Chagos Islands	Weycourt, Godalming

=== 2014 ===
23 February 2014 Friendly	Sealand	4–2	Chagos Islands	Weycourt, Godalming

5 May 2014 Friendly	Chagos Islands	1–1	Sealand	Broadfield Stadium, Crawley

31 October 2014 Friendly	Somaliland	1–1	Chagos Islands	Coles Park, Haringey

=== 2015 ===
20 December 2015 Friendly	Panjab	4–1	Chagos Islands	Central Ground, Sutton Coldfield

=== 2016 ===
29 May 2016 ConIFA WFC Group A	Abkhazia	9–0	Chagos Islands	Dinamo Stadium, Sokhumi
20:00 GET		Report

30 May 2016 ConIFA WFC Group A	Chagos Islands	0–12	Western Armenia	Dinamo Stadium, Sokhumi

2 June 2016 ConIFA WFC Placement Round 1	Chagos Islands	2–3	Somaliland	Daur Akhvlediani Stadium, Gagra
11:00 GET

3 June 2016 ConIFA WFC 11th place play-off	Chagos Islands	3–3 (2–4 p)	Raetia	Daur Akhvlediani Stadium, Gagra
11:00 GET

26 August 2016 World Unity Cup	Barawa	2–3	Chagos Islands	Sutton, London
15:30 GMT				Stadium: Gander Green Lane; Attendance: 627; Referee: Steve Lynch

27 August 2016 World Unity Cup	Chagos Islands	1–5	Tamil Eelam	Sutton, London
19:30 GMT				Stadium: Gander Green Lane

28 August 2016 World Unity Cup	Chagos Islands	1–5	Tamil Eelam	Sutton, London
18:15 GMT				Stadium: Gander Green Lane

=== 2017 ===
9 August 2017 Niamh Challenge Cup	Barawa	3–0	Chagos Islands	London

13 August 2017 Niamh Challenge Cup	Ellan Vannin (Isle of Man)	14–0	Chagos Islands	London

=== 2018 ===
25 March 2018 Friendly	Yorkshire	6–0	Chagos Islands	Yorkshire NuBuilds Stadium, Fitzwilliam
15:00 BST

8 April 2018 Friendly	Barawa	4–1	Chagos Islands	Coles Park, Haringey

7 June 2018 Friendly	Matabeleland	1–0	Chagos Islands	Parkside, Aveley
12:00 BST

9 June 2018 Friendly	Chagos Islands	1–6	Tuvalu	Bedfont Recreation Ground, Bedfont
12:00 BST

=== 2019 ===
28 April 2019 Friendly	Surrey	2–3	Chagos Islands	Merstham, Surrey
16:00 BST				Stadium: Moatside

25 May 2019 Friendly	Cascadia	6–3	Chagos Islands	Whyteleafe, Surrey
	Powell 22', 73'; Boone 23', 78'; Calfo 46'; Oldham 50'		Sagai 30'; Bunjun 51' (pen.); Heroseau 87'	Stadium: Church Road

2 June 2019 2019 Atlantic Heritage Cup	Parishes of Jersey	9–2	Chagos Islands	Harrogate, Yorkshire
15:00				Stadium: CNG Stadium

25 August 2019 Friendly	Kernow	10–3	Chagos Islands	Bodmin, Cornwall
15:00				Stadium: Priory Park

1 December 2019 Friendly	Supporting Charities F.C.	1–3	Chagos Islands	Hyde, Cheshire
17:30				Stadium: Ewen Fields

22 December 2019 Friendly	Chagos Islands	1–4	Surrey	Crawley, West Sussex
				Stadium: Broadfield 3G

29 December 2019 Friendly	Chagos Islands	0–6	Panjab	Horsham, West Sussex
				Stadium: Camping World Community Stadium

=== 2020 ===
TBC 2020 Atlantic Heritage Cup	Chagos Islands	v	Yorkshire	Yorkshire
				Stadium: TBC

=== 2021 ===
9 May 2021 Friendly	Surrey	2–3	Chagos Islands	Guildford, Surrey
13:00 BST				Stadium: Merrist Wood College

16 May 2021 WUFA World Series Semi-Final	Surrey	1–3	Chagos Islands	Guildford, Surrey
12:00 BST				Stadium: Merrist Wood College

23 May 2021 WUFA World Series Final	Barawa	2–2 (4–5 p)	Chagos Islands	Guildford, Surrey
15:00 BST				Stadium: Merrist Wood College; Referee: Nathan Bartram (Wales)

29 August 2021 Friendly	Kashmir	8–0	Chagos Islands	Bradford, Yorkshire
12:00 BST

=== 2022 ===
22 May 2022 Friendly	Surrey	2–2	Chagos Islands	Dorking, Surrey
15:30 BST				Stadium: Meadowbank

=== 2023 ===
3 July 2023 Friendly	Chagos Islands	4–0	Falkland Islands	Reigate, Surrey
19:30 BST				Stadium: Whitehall Lane

=== 2024 ===
9 June 2024 Friendly	Surrey	4 - 2	British Indian Ocean Territory	Dorking, Surrey
15:30 BST				Stadium: Meadowbank

7 July 2024 Friendly	British Indian Ocean Territory	1 - 0	(United Kingdom) British Medical	Reigate, Surrey
12:00 BST				Stadium: Whitehall Lane

21 July 2024 Friendly	Kernow	5–2	British Indian Ocean Territory	Liskeard, Cornwall
				Stadium: Lux Park

== Selected International opponents ==
=== Chagos Islands ===
Opponents	Matches	Win	Draw	Loss	GF	GA
Abkhazia	1	0	0	1	0	9
Barawa	4	1	1	2	6	11
Cascadia	1	0	0	1	3	6
Falkland Islands	1	1	0	0	4	0
Ellan Vannin	1	0	0	1	0	14
Kernow	1	0	0	1	3	10
Matabeleland	1	0	0	1	0	1
Panjab	1	0	0	1	1	4
Parishes of Jersey	1	0	0	1	2	9
Raetia	2	1	1	0	9	4
Sealand	3	1	1	1	6	6
Somaliland	1	0	0	1	3	4
Surrey	5	3	1	1	12	11
Tuvalu	1	0	0	1	1	6
Western Armenia	1	0	0	1	0	12
Yorkshire	1	0	0	1	0	6
Kashmir	1	0	0	1	0	8

=== Chagos BIOT ===
Opponents	Matches	Win	Draw	Loss	GF	GA
Kernow	1	0	0	1	2	5
Surrey	1	0	0	1	2	4

== Managers ==
Manager	Period	Played	Won	Drawn	Lost	Win %
(England) Jimmy Ferrar	2019-2024	9	4	2	3	44.4
Totals		32	8	5	19	25

== Historical kits ==
2011 Home (As (British Indian Ocean Territory) )	2012 Home	2013 Home	2014 Home	2017 Away	2018 Home	2019 Home	2019 Home

2019 Away
