= Ministry of Youth and Sports (Somaliland) =

Government ministry of Somaliland

Republic of Somaliland Ministry of Youth & Sports
- Wasaaradda Ciyaraaha & Dhallinyarada (MoYS)
- Coat of arms of Somaliland

Agency overview
- Formed: 20 February 2000
- Jurisdiction: Somaliland
- Headquarters: Hargeisa, Maroodi Jeh (Somaliland)
- Minister responsible: Ahmed Yasin Mohamed Farah
- Deputy Minister responsible: Yusuf Nouh Yusuf (Tadhase)
- Website: https://moys.govsomaliland.org

Footnotes
- Ministry of Youth and Sports on Facebook

The Ministry of Youth & Sports (Somali: Wasaaradda Ciyaraaha & Dhallinyarada Somaliland) (Arabic: وزارة الشباب والرياضة) is a Somaliland government ministry that is in charge of regulating activities related to sports and youth development in Somaliland. The current minister is Ahmed Yasin Mohamed Farah and the deputy minister is Yusuf Noah Yusuf.

== History ==
Prior to the establishment of a dedicated Ministry of Youth and Sports in 2000, sports and youth affairs were managed under the Ministry of Education, Youth and Sports (MOEYS). In 1997, in collaboration with UNICEF, a four-day educational workshop was held in Hargeisa focusing on physical education, recreation, and sports training.

The Ministry of Youth & Sports was established on 20 February 2000.

In July 2002, reports indicated that the football stadium in the Borama district had deteriorated into a waste dumping site, leading to public appeals for the government and the Ministry of Youth and Sports to rehabilitate the facility. During the same period, formal requests were directed to the Ministry and the national Olympic committee to include the Gabiley district in the upcoming inter-regional sports tournaments.

In 2004, the Somaliland Ministry of Youth and Sports organized a two-day coordination meeting in Burao for youth organizations in the Togdheer region. The meeting was aimed at strengthening cooperation with youth in the area, improving information sharing among agencies working with youth groups, and developing action plans for youth activities in the region.

In 2011, the ministry held its first major tournament, a Multi-sport event between the regions of the country called Somaliland Regional Games at Alamzey Stadium in Burao.

According to a report published in September 2014 by the international NGO Progressio, the Ministry of Youth, Sport and Tourism was evaluated as possessing a "medium to high" level of power because it represented the country's large youth demographic. However, its interest in inclusive decision-making and transparent processes was assessed as "low to medium." The report noted that the Ministry's activities were primarily focused on organizing inter-regional sports events, and female youth were not being adequately considered.

In October 2015, the Minister of Youth and Sports resigned from his position. The media speculated that the resignation stemmed from a dispute between the Ministry of Sports and the Ministry of Finance, following the latter's refusal to release funds requested for a sports tournament. Although the Minister denied these speculations when questioned by the press, he confirmed his departure from the cabinet. Having been at the top of the parliamentary waiting list since a seat became vacant a year earlier, the Minister became a Member of Parliament immediately following his resignation.

In March 2020, the media claimed that most sports competitions in the country were funded by private companies or individuals. The Ministry of Youth and Sports explained that 90% of the tournaments held across various regions are financed by the state budget under its management. However, it acknowledged that private companies do provide financial support for certain expenses.

In December 2020, Somaliland's first regional women's football tournament was planned as a seven-day event, featuring six teams representing all six regions of the country. However, the Ministry of Youth and Sports cancelled the tournament, citing "strong public backlash" on the grounds that it was "inconsistent with Islamic values and norms." The decision sparked intense anger among women's rights advocacy groups.

== Ministers of Youth and Sports ==
Image	Minister	Ministry Name	Term start	Term end
	Mohamed Farah Mohamoud (Jaweyn)	Wasaaradda Dhalinyarada iyo Ciyaaraha		November 2002
	Mohamoud Said Mohamed	Wasaaradda Dhalinyarada iyo Ciyaaraha	November 2002	
	Mohamed Ibrahim Madar	Wasaaradda Ciyaaraha, Dhallinyarada iyo Hiddaha	July 2010	June 2011
	Abdi Said Fahiye	Wasaaradda Ciyaaraha, Dhalinyarada iyo Dhaqanka	June 2011	March 2012
	Ali Said Raygal	Wasaaradda Ciyaaraha, Dhalinyarada iyo Dhaqanka	March 2012	February 2015
	Ahmed Abdi Kahin	Ministry of Youth and Sports; Wasaaradda Dhalinyarada iyo Ciyaaraha	February 2015	October 2015
	Abdillahi Farah Maidane	Wasaaradda Dhalinyarada iyo Ciyaaraha	October 2015	December 2016
	Abdirisaq Waberi Roble	Wasaaradda Ciyaaraha iyo Dhalinyarada	December 2016	
	Yusuf Mire Mohamed (Boos)	Wasaaradda Dhallinyarada iyo Ciyaaraha	December 2017	September 2021
	Abdirisaq Haji Duale (Qanbi)	Wasaaradda Dhallinyarada iyo Ciyaaraha	September 2021	September 2023
	Abdirahman Hirsi Jama (Dooble)	Wasaaradda Ciyaaraha iyo Dhalinyarada	September 2023	December 2023
	Abdirizak Muse Farah	Wasaaradda Ciyaaraha iyo Dhalinyarada	December 2023	
	Ahmed-yasin Mohamed Farah (Coofle)	Minister of Sports and Youth; Wasaaradda Dhallinyarada iyo Ciyaaraha	December 2024	

== See also ==
- Somaliland national football team
- Hargeisa Stadium
- Alamzey Stadium
