= 2020 CONIFA World Football Cup =

Tournament details
- Host country: North Macedonia
- Dates: 30 May – 7 June
- Teams: 16
- Venue(s): 1 (in 1 host city)

The 2020 CONIFA World Football Cup would have been the fourth edition of the CONIFA World Football Cup, an international football tournament for states, minorities, stateless peoples and regions unaffiliated with FIFA organized by CONIFA. Somaliland were originally announced as the tournament host, but were forced to withdraw as hosts in August 2019. It was later announced that the tournament would be held in Skopje, the capital city of North Macedonia, with no CONIFA member as designated host. However, on 23 March 2020 CONIFA announced that the tournament would not be taking place in North Macedonia from 30 May – 7 June because of the coronavirus pandemic. The Tournament was eventually cancelled by CONIFA with the organisation outlining plans to expand continental tournaments.

== Host selection ==
In January 2019, at the CONIFA Annual General Meeting in Krakow, Poland, it was announced that Somaliland had been selected to act as the host for the 2020 CONIFA World Football Cup. In August 2019 CONIFA announced that Somaliland had given up hosting rights for the 2020 ConIFA World Football Cup without naming a replacement. Kernow had subsequently bid to host the tournament. In December 2019 CONIFA announced that the tournament would be held in Skopje, the capital city of North Macedonia with no CONIFA member as designated host.

== Venues ==
North Macedonia
Skopje, Skopje
Toše Proeski Arena

Capacity: 36,460

== Qualification ==
CONIFA assigns the number of berths for each continent according to the percentage of CONIFA members that come from that continent. Europe has 4 berths, including one for the winners of the 2019 CONIFA European Football Cup. Asia and Africa both have 3, and North America, South America and Oceania have one berth each. Additionally, one berth is reserved for a wild card team. Kárpátalja, the defending champions, qualified automatically. Originally, Somaliland qualified automatically as hosts, but the tournament has since been moved to North Macedonia and no CONIFA member is hosting, so it was unclear whether Somaliland has still qualified.

Not all CONIFA members entered qualification, and in the continents of Africa and South America, an equal number of teams entered compared to the number of berths available, so all entrants from those continents qualified automatically.

=== Qualified teams ===
Team	Region	Method of qualification	Date of qualification	Finals appearance	Previous appearance	Previous best performance	Notes
Western Sahara	Africa	Wild Card	17 May 2019	1st	N/A	N/A	Subsequently, withdrew
Mapuche	South America	Regional Qualification	18 June 2019	1st	N/A	N/A	
Kárpátalja	Europe	Defending Champion	9 May 2018	2nd	2018	Champions (2018)	
South Ossetia	Europe	European Champion	9 June 2019	2nd	2014	4th (2014)	
Darfur	Africa	Regional Qualification	18 June 2019	2nd	2014	12th (2014)	
Matabeleland	Africa	Regional Qualification	18 June 2019	2nd	2018	13th (2018)	
Kabylia	Africa	Regional Qualification	18 June 2019	2nd	2018	10th (2018)	
Cascadia	North America	Regional Qualification	4 January 2020	2nd	2018	6th (2018)	
Chagos Islands	Africa	Global Ticket	4 January 2020	2nd	2016	12th (2016)	
Kernow	Europe	Regional Qualification	4 January 2020	1st	N/A	N/A	
Australian First Nations	Oceania	Regional Qualification	4 January 2020	1st	N/A	N/A	
Panjab	Asia	Regional Qualification	4 January 2020	3rd	2018	Runners-up (2016)	
Parishes of Jersey	Europe	Regional Qualification	4 January 2020	1st	N/A	N/A	
Tamil Eelam	Asia	Regional Qualification	4 January 2020	3rd	2018	11th (2014)	
United Koreans in Japan	Asia	Regional Qualification	4 January 2020	3rd	2018	7th (2016)	
Western Armenia	Europe	Regional Qualification	4 January 2020	3rd	2018	6th (2016)	
County of Nice	Europe	Replacement		1st	2014	Champions (2014)	Replaced Western Sahara

== Controversy ==
The decision by CONIFA to originally host the 2020 World Football Cup in Somaliland was met with criticism by some, with James Scott, the president of Parishes of Jersey FC, telling the Jersey Evening Post that he would not accept the place at the final tournament if his side won the Atlantic Heritage Cup. The comments were met with a backlash from CONIFA, who criticised inaccurate reporting and defended the decision to host the World Football Cup in Somaliland. The competition was later moved to North Macedonia after Somaliland had hosting rights revoked by CONIFA.

== Postponement and cancellation ==
On 22 March 2020, members of the CONIFA Executive Committee made the decision that the tournament would not be taking place in North Macedonia from 30 May – 7 June 2020 due to the COVID-19 emergency being seen across the world. On 29 April 2020 the CONIFA Executive Committee announced through its social media channels that the competition was cancelled, with no rescheduling, and the organisation outlining plans to expand continental competitions in the future by redirecting funding from the 2020 World Football Cup from sponsors Sportsbet.io.
