= Ospedaletti =

Ospedaletti Spiareti
- Comune
- Comune di Ospedaletti
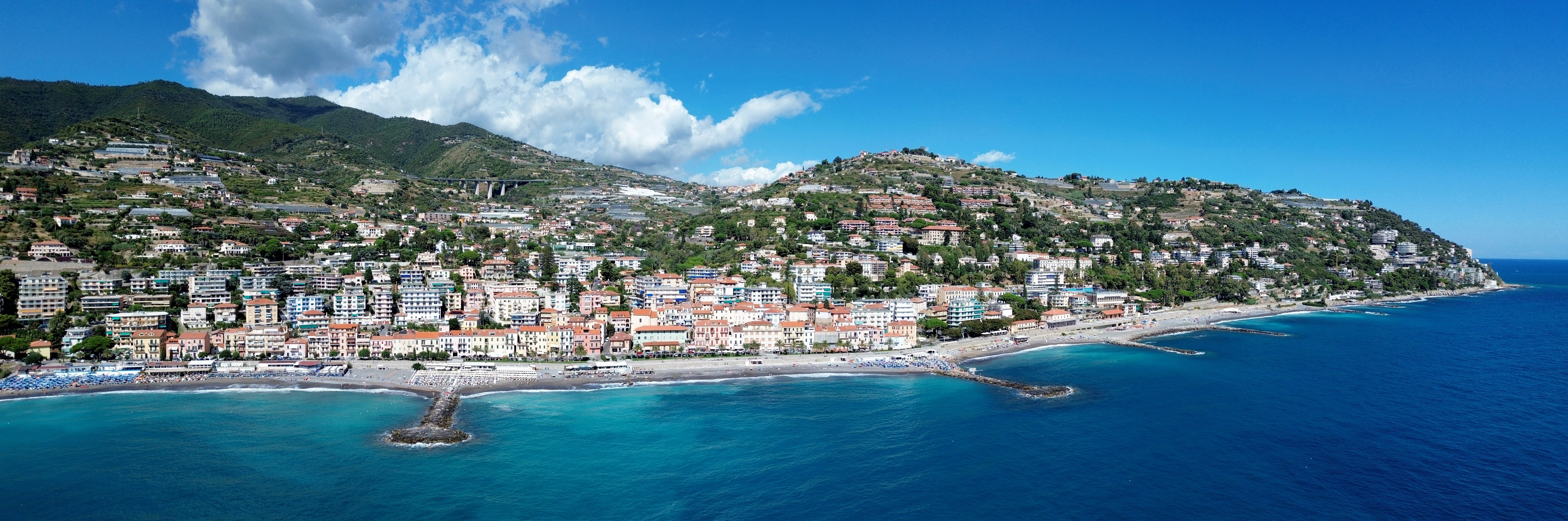
- View of Ospedaletti

- Location within Italy Location within Liguria
- Coordinates: 43°48′N 7°43′E
- Country: Italy
- Region: Liguria
- Province: Imperia (IM)
- Frazioni: Porrine

Government
  - Mayor: Daniele Cimiotti

Area
  - Total: 5.45 km^{2} (2.10 sq mi)
- Elevation: 5 m (16 ft)

Population (28 February 2017)
  - Total: 3,336
  - Density: 612/km^{2} (1,590/sq mi)
- Demonym: Ospedalettesi
- Time zone: UTC+1 (CET)
  - Summer (DST): UTC+2 (CEST)
- Postal code: 18014
- Dialing code: 0184
- Website: Official website

Ospedaletti (Ligurian: Spiareti) is a comune (municipality) in the Province of Imperia in the Italian region of Liguria, located about 120 kilometres (75 mi) southwest of Genoa and about 25 kilometres (16 mi) southwest of Imperia.

Ospedaletti borders the following municipalities: Bordighera, Sanremo, Seborga, and Vallebona.

== History ==
Ospedaletti is named after a 14th-century hospital which was established by the Knights of Saint John of Jerusalem.

== Geography ==
Located between Caponero and Cape Sant'Ampelio, just six kilometres from Sanremo, it gets some north winds. It is about 30 kilometres (19 mi) from Imperia, the provincial capital. The lush, sub-tropical vegetation, combined with moderate and refined urbanization, makes Ospedaletti the pearl of the Riviera dei Fiori (Coast of Flowers). The climate is usually mild.

== Twin towns ==
Ospedaletti is twinned with:

- Soulac-sur-Mer, France (1972)
