= All Black FC =

All Black Football Club (Chinese: 香港全黑足球會) is a football club based in Hong Kong.

== History ==
All Black FC was founded in 2016.
