= Patrick McGuire (footballer) =

English footballer

Personal information
- Date of birth: 27 September 1987 (age 39)
- Place of birth: Bradford, England
- Height: 1.78 m (5 ft 10 in)
- Position: Midfielder

Team information
- Current team: Yorkshire (manager)

Youth career
- 2002–2006: Bradford City

Senior career*
Years	Team	Apps	(Gls)
2006-2007	Bradford City	0	(0)
2007–2008	Farsley Celtic		
2008	Woodley Sports		
2008–2009	Buxton		
2009	→ Glapwell (loan)		
2009	Guiseley		
2009	Glapwell		
2009–2010	Ossett Town		
2010–2011	Frickley Athletic		
2011–2012	Wakefield		
2012–2013	Harrogate Railway Athletic		
2013	Guiseley		
2013–2014	Ossett Town		
2014–2019	Thackley		

International career
2018–2021	Yorkshire	6	(0)

Managerial career
- 2018-2022: Thackley
- 2022–: Yorkshire
- 2023–2024: Frickley Athletic
- 2024: Maltby Main (joint)
- * Club domestic league appearances and goals as of 12:22, 12 August 2007 (UTC)

Patrick McGuire (born 27 September 1987) is an English former semi-professional footballer who played as a midfielder. He is the current head coach of the Yorkshire football team.

== Career ==
Born in Baildon, McGuire signed with Bradford City aged 11, before graduating through the Bradford City 'Centre of Excellence' and signed a youth team scholarship at the age of 15, ensuring him a full-time apprenticeship as a footballer when leaving school a year later.

At the beginning of March 2006, McGuire was offered a full professional contract with the club. He made his debut in a 2–1 defeat to Scunthorpe United in the Football League Trophy and also made a substitute appearance for Bradford in 2006 with Bradford winning 4–0 in the FA Cup First Round against Crewe Alexandra. He was released at the end of the season and signed for Farsley Celtic.

After making just a couple of appearances in the 2007–08 season, he moved on to play semi professionally with Woodley Sports in March 2008 before joining Buxton. He spent a spell on loan at Glapwell on loan in September 2009

Next he joined Ossett Town, before moving to Frickley Athletic in July 2010 and Wakefield in November 2010. A move to Guiseley was followed by a return to former club Ossett Town, before signing initially as a player for Thackley afterwards.

In January 2018, McGuire was called up to the Yorkshire football team, a team represented in ConIFA from players in the region.

== Coaching career ==
Following the resignation of manager Chris Reape, McGuire and fellow senior player Mike Garrod took charge of Thackley as joint-managers in January 2018. Due to Garrod's decision to leave in May 2018 after guiding the club to safety in the NCEL, McGuire became the sole manager at the club. During his tenure at Thackley, McGuire reached consecutive NCEL League Cup quarter-finals, as well as a County Cup semi-final, whilst establishing the team as a top-half team in the league. However, following poor performances despite a much-publicised increased playing budget, McGuire parted company with Thackley in December 2022.

In February 2023, McGuire was confirmed as the new manager of Frickley Athletic, a team which McGuire had previously featured for. He was joined by assistant manager Blake Campbell. In April 2023, both McGuire and Campbell succeeded in avoiding relegation with the club.

In addition to being the first team manager of Frickley Athletic, McGuire also coached the Yorkshire football team (a role which he has held since June 2022), and was the scholarship head coach at Bradford (Park Avenue).

In March 2024, McGuire was released as manager by Frickley Athletic due to a poor run of results. Subsequently, McGuire was appointed joint-manager of Maltby Main alongside Joe Austin in May 2024, before leaving the club in July owing to increased work commitments.

In March 2025, he returned to former club Bradford City, as a professional development phase link coach.
