= Parishes of Jersey football team =

Unofficial national football team representing the island of Jersey

Parishes of Jersey
- Association: Parishes of Jersey FC
- Confederation: World Unity Football Alliance
- Head coach: James Scott
- Captain: Jack Boyle
- Most caps: 7 players (3)
- Top scorer: Tom Harris, Kieran Lester (3)
- Home stadium: Various
First colours	Second colours

First international
- Parishes of Jersey 2–1 Yorkshire (Saint Peter, Jersey; 21 October 2018)

Biggest win
- Parishes of Jersey 9–2 Chagos Islands (Harrogate, Yorkshire; 2 June 2019)

Biggest defeat
- Yorkshire 1–0 Parishes of Jersey (Ossett, Yorkshire; 1 June 2019)

The Parishes of Jersey football team is a representative team of Jersey in international football. As opposed to the Jersey official football team, which is administered by the Jersey Football Association and is seen as part of the English FA, the Parishes of Jersey team is independent and operates as a member of the WUFA. As it is not a member of UEFA or FIFA, it cannot compete in the FIFA World Cup or UEFA European Championship. Parishes of Jersey were members of CONIFA between 2018 and 2021 and had qualified for the 2020 CONIFA World Football Cup before the tournament was cancelled due to COVID-19.

== History ==
The Parishes of Jersey team was formed in summer 2018 by former Jersey international James Scott, after the Jersey Football Association's unsuccessful application to join UEFA. In June 2018, ConIFA general secretary Sascha Düerkop offered an invitation to Jersey to join the organization, and in September, the team was officially accepted as a member after signing a memorandum of understanding with the JFA.

While it was originally thought that Parishes of Jersey would make its international debut in a 2019 CONIFA European Football Cup qualification tournament in November, it was announced a week later that their first international fixture would be a home tie against fellow newcomers Yorkshire on 21 October. On 3 October, Jack Boyle was announced as the first captain of the team.

Coverage of the first match was provided by BBC Radio Jersey. Captain Jack Boyle scored the first ever goal for the team during the game. On 7 July, 2020, Parishes of Jersey were announced as a founding member of the World Unity Football Alliance. On 2 February, 2021, Parishes of Jersey announced they had left CONIFA by an open letter to their players after being left disappointed by the organisation, feeling they'd been omitted from the 2021 CONIFA European Football Cup as punishment for joining the World Unity Football Alliance the previous summer.

== Fixtures & Results ==
Win Draw Loss

=== 2018 ===
21 October Friendly	Parishes of Jersey	2–1	Yorkshire	Saint Peter
	Boyle 23'; C. Weir 76'		Ripley 83'	Stadium: La Rue des Vignes

=== 2019 ===
1 June 2019 2019 Atlantic Heritage Cup	Yorkshire	1–0	Parishes of Jersey	Ossett, Yorkshire
15:00	Litchfield 90+3'			Stadium: Ingfield Stadium; Attendance: 521; Referee: Karl Parker

2 June 2019 2019 Atlantic Heritage Cup	Parishes of Jersey	9–2	Chagos Islands	Harrogate, Yorkshire
15:00	Lester 5', 26', 41'; Hinds 7', 71'; Harris 52', 61', 67'; Watson 89'		Leelah 19', 21'	Stadium: CNG Stadium; Referee: Chris Akers

=== 2021 ===
29 May 2021 Southern Frontier Cup	TBC	Cancelled	Parishes of Jersey	Whyteleafe, Surrey
				Stadium: Church Road

30 May 2021 Southern Frontier Cup	TBC	Cancelled	Parishes of Jersey	Whyteleafe, Surrey
				Stadium: Church Road

== Selected International Opponents ==
Opponents	Matches	Win	Draw	Loss	GF	GA
Chagos Islands	1	1	0	0	9	2
Yorkshire	2	1	0	1	2	2

== Squad ==
The following players were called up to the squad for the 2019 Atlantic Heritage Cup in June 2019.

Caps and goals correct as of 2 June 2019 after the game against Chagos Islands.

No.	Pos.	Player	Date of birth (age)	Caps	Goals	Club
1	GK	Euan van der Vliet	11 August 1996 (aged 22)	2	0	(Jersey Football Association) Jersey Bulls
18	GK	Daniel Birrell	4 April 2000 (aged 19)	1	0	(Jersey Football Association) Jersey Bulls
2	DF	Harry Curtis	23 February 1999 (aged 20)	3	0	(Jersey Football Association) St. Paul's
4	DF	Luke Campbell (vice-captain)	4 May 1989 (aged 30)	3	0	(Jersey Football Association) Jersey Bulls
9	DF	Michael Weir	18 February 1991 (aged 28)	3	0	(Jersey Football Association) St. Paul's
5	DF	Connor O'Shea	3 October 1999 (aged 19)	2	0	(Jersey Football Association) St. Clement
6	DF	James Carr	28 December 2001 (aged 17)	2	0	(Jersey Football Association) Jersey Bulls
7	MF	Luke Watson	29 January 1987 (aged 32)	3	1	(Jersey Football Association) St. Paul's
11	MF	Zeljko Martinovic	30 November 1993 (aged 25)	3	0	(Jersey Football Association) Jersey Bulls
3	MF	Jay Giles	22 November 1995 (aged 23)	2	0	(Jersey Football Association) Jersey Bulls
14	MF	Tom Harris	25 July 1998 (aged 20)	1	3	(Jersey Football Association) St. Clement
17	MF	Johnny Sellers	1 October 1996 (aged 22)	1	0	(Jersey Football Association) Jersey Wanderers
19	MF	Mark Logue	28 November 1997 (aged 21)	1	0	(Jersey Football Association) St. Peter
16	FW	Karl Hinds	10 December 1998 (aged 20)	3	2	(Jersey Football Association) Jersey Bulls
10	FW	Adam Trotter	15 January 1996 (aged 23)	3	0	(Jersey Football Association) Jersey Bulls
17	FW	Kieran Lester	19 July 1991 (aged 27)	2	3	(Jersey Football Association) Jersey Bulls
12	FW	Jake Prince	29 June 1998 (aged 20)	1	0	(Jersey Football Association) St. Paul's

== Recent call-ups ==
The following players have been called up in the past twelve months or withdrew from the squad due to injury or suspension.

Pos.	Player	Date of birth (age)	Caps	Goals	Club	Latest call-up
GK	Matt Donaldson	10 August 1994 (aged 24)	0	0	(Jersey) St. Peter	v. Yorkshire, 21 October 2018
DF	Jack Cannon	17 February 1987 (age 39)	1	0	(Jersey) St. Paul's	2019 Atlantic Heritage Cup^{PRE}
DF	James Quérée	23 July 1990 (aged 28)	1	0	Jersey Bulls	v. Yorkshire, 21 October 2018
MF	Jack Boyle (captain)	9 July 1990 (age 35)	1	1	Jersey Bulls	2019 Atlantic Heritage Cup^{PRE}
MF	Calvin Weir	7 March 1994 (aged 24)	1	1	(Jersey) St. Paul's	v. Yorkshire, 21 October 2018
MF	Jake Baker	9 December 1992 (age 33)	0	0	(Jersey) St. Peter	v. Yorkshire, 21 October 2018
FW	Sol Solomon	17 March 2001 (age 25)	0	0	Jersey Bulls	2019 Atlantic Heritage Cup^{PRE}

== Staff ==
Position	Name
Manager	(Jersey) James Scott
Head coach	(Jersey) Simon Moiani
Goalkeeper Coach	(Jersey) Matt Elcock
Coach	(Jersey) Mark Logue
Physio	(Jersey) Sam Freeborn

== See also ==
- Jersey official football team
