= Somaliland national football team =

Men's association football team

Somaliland
- Association: Somaliland Football Association
- Head coach: Omar Abdillahi
- Captain: Mohamed Jama
- Most caps: Abdillahi Nur
- Home stadium: Hargeisa Stadium
- FIFA code: SMD
First colours	Second colours

First international
- Somaliland 1–2 Ethiopia (Hargeisa, Somaliland; 6 November 2003)

The Somaliland national football team is the football team that represents Somaliland, a self-declared republic internationally recognised as a de facto state. Although Somaliland is a de facto state, it has not yet received international de jure recognition. Somaliland is not a member of FIFA or the Confederation of African Football (CAF). Instead, it is an associate member of the Confederation of Independent Football Associations (ConIFA), an association established in 2014 of teams from dependencies, unrecognised states, minorities, stateless peoples, and regions that are not affiliated with FIFA.

== History ==
The Somaliland national team's first known match was on 6 November 2002 against Ethiopia, ending in a 1–2 loss; however, their first "proper" international match was a 2–2 draw against Sealand, played on 17 May 2014 in London, England.

The Somaliland Football Association runs a national league consisting of 12 semi-professional clubs, sponsored or backed by both public and private organisations. The Association also holds a biannual inter-regional football tournament, in which all 13 regions participate in group stages held across the country, with the final four group winners contesting the semi-finals in the capital, Hargeisa.

=== 2016 ConIFA World Football Cup ===
Following ConIFA's annual conference, the Somaliland national team was invited to compete at the 2016 ConIFA World Football Cup (hosted by Abkhazia), which became their first appearance at an international tournament.

Somaliland was drawn into Group D alongside Panjab and Sápmi. Somaliland lost their opening game against Sápmi with a score of 5–0, and lost again to Panjab 5–0, resulting in Somaliland finishing at the bottom of Group D.

In Placement Round 1, Somaliland won 3–2 against the Chagos Islands to advance to Placement Round 2. In their Placement Round 2 match against Székely Land, Somaliland lost 3–10, placing tenth out of twelve teams.

== Stadium ==
Hargeysa National Stadium is the home of the national team and has a capacity of 12,000.

== Coaches ==
Name	Nat	Period	Matches	Wins	Draws	Losses	Efficiency %
Fuad Abdillahi Isse	Somaliland	2012–2015					%
Omar Abdillahi	Somaliland	2015–?					%

== Current squad ==
No.	Pos.	Player	Date of birth (age)	Caps	Goals	Club
1	GK	Abdirisaq Mohamed Jama				(Somaliland Football Association) Maroodi Jeeh
23	GK	Abdiqani Saleban Aynan				(Somaliland Football Association) Hawd
22	GK	Mohamed Ahmed Hashi				(Somaliland Football Association) Sanaag
2	DF	Abdifatah Osman Hussein				(Somaliland Football Association) Maroodi Jeeh
3	DF	Abdisamad Ibrahim Miigane				(Somaliland Football Association) Awdal
4	DF	Ibrahim Said Dahir				(Somaliland Football Association) Awdal
5	DF	Abdirahman Mohamed Mohamoud				(Somaliland Football Association) Saaxil
19	DF	Abdirisaq Hassan Jama				(Somaliland Football Association) Togdheer
18	DF	Abdirahman Jama Musa				(Somaliland Football Association) Gabiley
6	MF	Abdikarin Mohamed Hersi				(Somaliland Football Association) Maroodi Jeeh
8	MF	Hamse Ahmed Abdillahi				(Somaliland Football Association) Hawd
14	MF	Muhiyadin Duale Diriye				(Somaliland Football Association) Awdal
15	MF	Jama Abdillahi Awad				(Somaliland Football Association) Saaxil
16	MF	Farhan Mohamed Ahmed				(Somaliland Football Association) Togdheer
7	MF	Abdirahman Ibrahim Alixayd				(Somaliland Football Association) Sanaag
21	MF	Omar Ali Osman				(Somaliland Football Association) Gabiley
13	MF	Sakariye Ali Egeh				(Somaliland Football Association) Gabiley
24	FW	Abdiriyad Bashir Abdi				(Somaliland Football Association) Maroodi Jeeh
12	FW	Mohamoud Abdi Hassan				(Somaliland Football Association) Maroodi Jeeh
9	FW	Sharma'arke Fu'ad Ali				(Somaliland Football Association) Maroodi Jeeh
10	FW	Haibe Good Hurre				(Somaliland Football Association) Hawd
11	FW	Awil Mohamed Elmi				(Somaliland Football Association) Hawd
26	FW	Liban Mohamed Ahmed				(Somaliland Football Association) Awdal
17	FW	Ahmed Abdi Osman				(Somaliland Football Association) Sool
20	FW	Ibrahim Abdirahman Salah				(Somaliland Football Association) Sanaag
25	FW	Guleid Hassan Muhumed				(Somaliland Football Association) Gabiley

== Association officials ==
Name	Position
(Somaliland) Ilyas Mohamed	President
(Somaliland) Guiled Adan	Chief Operating Officer
(Somaliland) Idris Mohamed	General Secretary

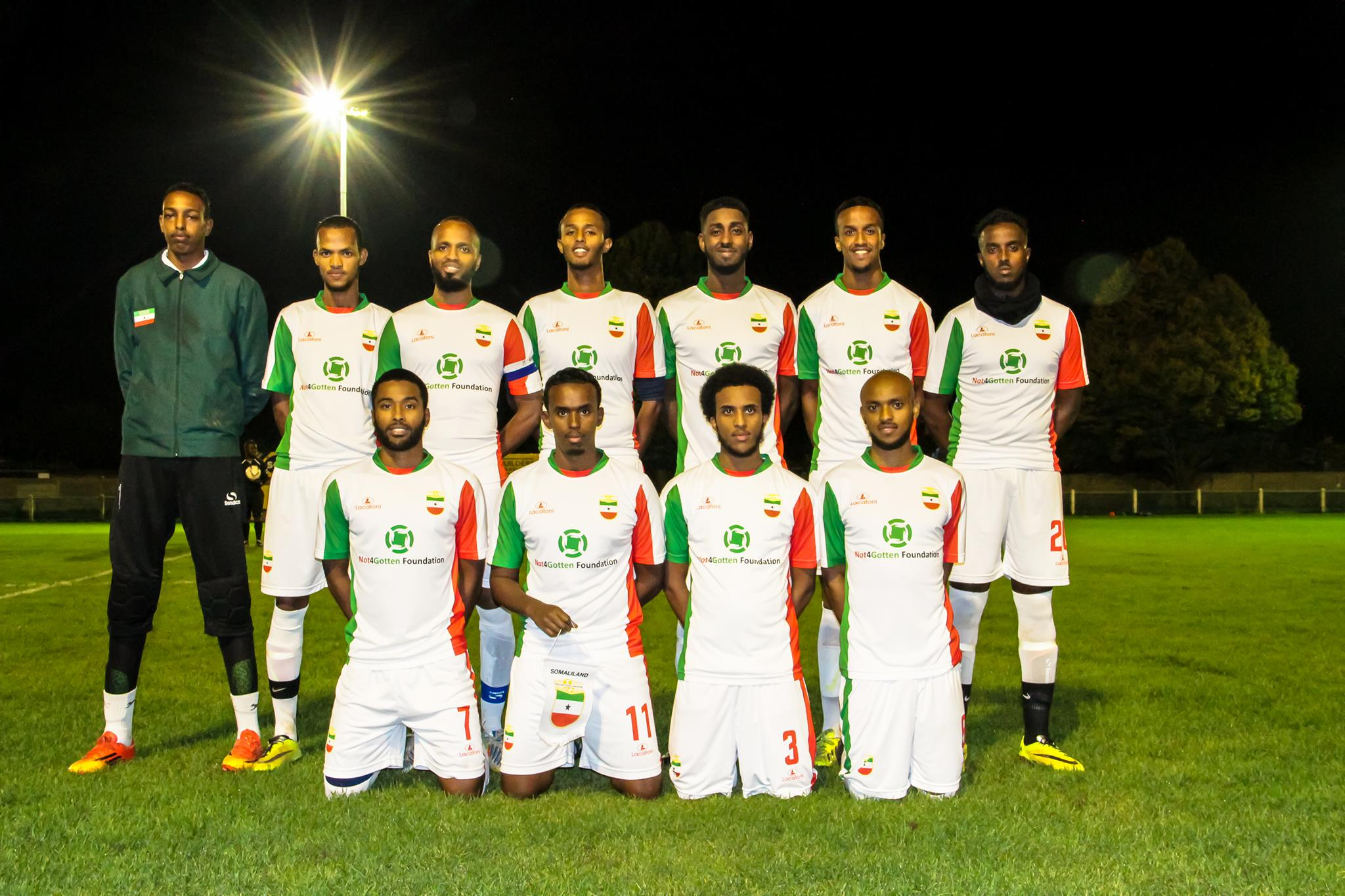
Somaliland national football team starting XI

== Historical kits ==
2014 Home	2014 Away	2015 African Cup (UK)	2015 African Cup (UK)	2016 Home	2016 Away

== See also ==
- Somaliland
