= Lists of national association football teams by nickname =

The following is a list of nicknames of national association football teams.

== FIFA teams ==
- List of AFC national association football teams by nickname
- List of CAF national association football teams by nickname
- List of CONCACAF national association football teams by nickname
- List of CONMEBOL national association football teams by nickname
- List of OFC national association football teams by nickname
- List of UEFA national association football teams by nickname

== Non-FIFA and former teams ==
- List of non-FIFA and former national association football teams by nickname

== See also ==
- Glossary of association football terms
- List of men's national association football teams
- List of women's national association football teams
