= List of AFC national association football teams by nickname =

The following is a list of nicknames of Asian Football Confederation (AFC) national association football teams.

== Nicknames ==
- Translations listed in italics are commonly used in English.

=== Men's ===
Team	Nickname	English translation	Notes	Ref.
Afghanistan	شیرهای خراسان; Šīrhā-yi Khurāsān	The Lions of Khorasan	Afghanistan in general and the Khorasan region in particular is referred to as the "Land of Lions".	
Australia	Socceroos		Blend word formed by "Soccer" and "Kangaroos".	
Bahrain	الأحمر al-Aḥmar	The Reds	Referring to the Bahraini team's red kits.	
Bangladesh	Bengal Tigers		The Bengal tiger is the national animal of Bangladesh.	
Bhutan	Dragon Boys		Referring to the "Thunder Dragon", known locally as the "Druk", a national symbol of Bhutan.	
Brunei	Tebuan	The Wasps	Referring to the team's yellow and black kits, which are also the colours of the flag of Brunei.	
Cambodia	អ្នកចម្បាំងអង្គរ; Neak Chomreang Angkor	Angkor Warriors	Angkor was the capital city of the Khmer Empire, which flourished from approximately the 9th to 15th centuries. It was also one of the world's early megacities.	
Cambodia	គោព្រៃកម្ពុជា Kouprey Kampuchea	Koupreys of Cambodia	The kouprey is a possibly extinct species of bovine native to Southeast Asia. It is the national mammal of Cambodia.	
China	龙之队 (Note: In Simplified Chinese, utilized in Mainland China and Singapore); Lóng zhī duì (Note: Chinese pronunciation: [lʊŋ˩˥ ʈ͡ʂɻ̩˥ twei̯˥˩])	Dragon Team	The dragon is an important symbol of Chinese culture.	
Chinese Taipei	藍翼軍團 (Note: In Traditional Chinese, utilized in Hong Kong, Macao, and Taiwan); Lányì jūntuán (Note: Chinese pronunciation: [lan˩˥ji˦˥˩ t͜ɕyn˥tʰwan˩˥])	Blue Wings	Referring to Taiwan's blue home kit, as well as the Taiwan blue magpie which is present on the Chinese Taipei Football Association logo.	
Guam	Matao	The Noblemen	"Matao" is the Chamorro word for nobility.	
Hong Kong	勁揪; Jìng jiū (Note: Mandarin Chinese transliteration) (Note: Chinese pronunciation: [t͡ɕiŋ˥˩ t͡ɕjoʊ̯˥]) ging6 cau1 (Note: Cantonese transliteration)	The Strength	A popular slang term in Hong Kong which translated means "strong, powerful and/or sturdy"	
Hong Kong	蛟龍; Jiāo lóng (Note: Chinese pronunciation: [t͡ɕjaʊ̯˥ lʊŋ˩˥]) gaau1 lung4	The Dragons	The dragon is an important symbol in Chinese culture and is also used by Hong Kongers to show their pride.	
India	The Blue Tigers		The colour blue, present on the Ashoka Chakra symbol on India's flag, as well as the Bengal tiger are national symbols of India.	
Indonesia	Tim Garuda	Garuda Team	The Garuda, a mythical bird, is a national symbol of Indonesia.	
Indonesia	Merah Putih	The Red and White	Referring to the Indonesian flag.	
Iran	تیم ملی; Tīm-e Mellī (Team Melli)	The National Team	Literally meaning "the national team" in Persian.	
Iran	شیران پارس; Šīrān-e Pārs	Lions of Persia	Refers to the Persian lion.	
Iran	یوزپلنگان; Yūzpalangān	The Cheetahs	The nickname refers to the Asiatic cheetah, which featured on Iran's 2014 FIFA World Cup kit.	
Iraq	أسود الرافدين; Usūd al-Rāfidayn	Lions of Mesopotamia	The nickname reflects Iraq's ancient heritage, where lions frequently appeared in Mesopotamian art and symbolism.	
Japan	サムライ・ブルー; Samurai Burū (Note: Japanese pronunciation: [sa̠mɯ̥̈ɾa̠ː bɯ̥̈ɾɯ̥̈])	Samurai Blue	The samurai is a well-known symbol of Japan, while the Japanese national team's colours are predominantly blue.	
Jordan	النشامى al-Našāmā	The Chivalrous Ones	"An-Nashama" means "The Chivalrous Ones" in Arabic.	
Kuwait	الأزرق al-Azraq	The Blues	Blue is the color of the Kuwaiti national team's kits.	
Kyrgyzstan	Ак шумкарлар Ak shumkarlar	White Falcons	The nickname refers to the falcon, a bird of prey associated with the team's identity.	
Laos	ທີມຊາດ; Thim Xat	The National Team	Literally "the National Team" in Lao.	
Laos	ລ້ານຊ້າງ; Lan Xang	Million Elephants	Laos is known as the "Land of a Million Elephants", referring to both the importance of elephants in Laotian culture and the Kingdom of Lan Xang, the first united Laotian state and one of the largest kingdoms in Southeast Asian history.	
Lebanon	رجال الأرز; Rijāl al-Arz	The Cedars	The cedar is an important national symbol of Lebanon and appears on the country's flag.	
Macau	A Equipa Verde	The Green Team	Green is the color of the flag of Macau.	
Malaysia	Harimau Malaya	Malayan Tigers	The Malayan tiger is the national animal of Malaysia.	
Maldives	Red Snappers		The red snapper is a species of fish usually seen in the Maldives.	
Mongolia	Xөx чононууд Khökh Chononuud	Blue Wolves	The blue wolf features in traditional Mongolian origin mythology and is a symbol associated with Mongolian cultural heritage.	
Myanmar	Chinthe		The Chinthe is a mythical lion, regularly seen outside pagodas in Myanmar. It is considered an important cultural and national symbol of the country.	
Nepal	नेपाली राष्ट्रिय फुटबल टोली Nepālī rāṣṭriya phuṭabala ṭolī	Nepali national football team	The name means "Nepali national football team" and is the standard Nepali-language designation for the national side.	
Nepal	The Gorkhalis		The nickname refers to the Gurkha tradition, associated with Nepal's military history.	
North Korea	천리마; Cheollima	Chollima	The Chollima is a mythical horse and a national symbol of North Korea.	
Oman	الأحمر al-Aḥmar	The Reds	Referring to the Omani team's red kits.	
Oman	سامبا الخليج; Sāmbā al-Khalīj	Gulf Samba	The nickname compares the team's style of play to Brazilian samba football.	
Pakistan	شاہین; Shāhīn	The Falcons	The Shaheen falcon is the state bird of Pakistan and is heavily associated with the national poet Allama Iqbal's poetry.	
Palestine	أسود كنعان ʾUsūd Kanʿān	Lions of Canaan	The nickname combines the lion with Canaan, the historical name for a region encompassing present-day Palestine and surrounding areas.	
Palestine	الفدائيون al-Fidāʾiyyūn	The Fedayeen	Referring to the Palestinian fedayeen.	
Philippines	Azkals		Stylised form of "askal", a Tagalog slang for a stray or mixed-breed dog. The nickname, adopted in the 2010s, represents tenacity and resilience and is also a reference to the mixed heritage of many Filipino players.	
Qatar	العنابي al-ʿAnnābī	The Maroons	From the national flag of Qatar.	
Saudi Arabia	الصقور الخضر al-Ṣuqūr al-Khuḍr	The Green Falcons	Falconry is an important aspect of Arabian culture, as well as the Bedouins that came before them. The colour green comes from the Saudi flag.	
Saudi Arabia	الصقور العربية al-Ṣuqūr al-ʿArabiyya	The Arabian Falcons	Falconry is an important aspect of Arabian culture, as well as the Bedouins that came before them. The colour green comes from the Saudi flag.	
Saudi Arabia	الأخضر al-Akhḍar	The Green	Falconry is an important aspect of Arabian culture, as well as the Bedouins that came before them. The colour green comes from the Saudi flag.	
Singapore	The Lions		The name Singapore derives from Singapura, commonly interpreted as "Lion City" from Sanskrit-derived elements.	
South Korea	태극 전사; Taegeuk Jeonsa	Taegeuk Warriors	The Taegeuk on the South Korean flag represents the balance of yin and yang.	
South Korea	아시아의 호랑이; Asia-ui Horangi	Asian Tigers	The tiger is a symbol of bravery and strength.	
Sri Lanka	Golden Lions		Derived from the lion symbol on the flag of Sri Lanka.	
Syria	نسور قاسيون; Nusūr Qāsiyūn	Qasioun Eagles	Mount Qasioun is a mountain overlooking the city of Damascus.	
Tajikistan	Шерҳои Форсӣ; Sherhoi forsī	Persian Lions	The nickname combines the lion, a symbol of strength and courage, with the team's association with Persian culture and heritage.	
Thailand	ช้างศึก; Chang Suek	War Elephants	The elephant is an important symbol in Thai culture.	
Timor-Leste	O Sol Nascente	The Rising Sun	Timor Leste is known as the land of the rising sun.	
Timor-Leste	Lafaek	The Crocodiles	Crocodiles are revered as the indigenous creation myth of Lafaek Diak in East Timor, where they are honoured with shrines across the country.	
Timor-Leste	The Little Samba Nation		The nickname has been used in media coverage of the team's recruitment of naturalised Brazilian players.	
Turkmenistan	Karakum Warriors		The Karakum Desert covers about 70 percent of Turkmenistan.	
United Arab Emirates	الأبيض al-Abyaḍ	The Whites	Referring to the United Arab Emirates team's white kits.	
United Arab Emirates	عيال زايد ʿIyāl Zāyid	Sons of Zayed	Sheikh Zayed bin Sultan Al Nahyan was the founding father of the United Arab Emirates.	
Uzbekistan	Oq boʻrilar	White Wolves	The nickname refers to the grey wolf, an important symbolic figure in Turkic mythology and cultural tradition.	
Vietnam	Những Chiến Binh Sao Vàng	Golden Star Warriors	Derived from the "golden star" on the Vietnamese flag.	
Yemen	اليمن السعيد al-Yaman al-saʿīd	The Happy Yemen	Ancient historians refer to Yemen as "Arabia Felix", meaning "Happy" or "Fortunate Arabia" in Latin.	

=== Women's ===
- Teams not listed below generally use the same nickname as their male counterpart.

Team	Nickname	English translation	Notes	Ref.
Australia	Matildas		From the Australian folk song "Waltzing Matilda".	
China	铿锵玫瑰; Kēngqiāng méiguī (Note: Chinese pronunciation: [kɤŋ˥t͡ɕʰjaŋ˥ meɪ̯˩˥kweɪ̯˥])	The Steel Roses	In the 1999 World Cup final match, the Chinese team lost to the United States on penalties. After that loss, the Chinese team was nicknamed "Steel Roses" by their fans.	
Chinese Taipei	木蘭女足; Mùlán nǚzú (Note: Chinese pronunciation: [mu˥˩lan˩˥ ny˧˦˧t͡ɕʰjoʊ̯˩˥])	Team Mulan	This nickname was given by General Zheng Weiyuan, chairman of the CTFA in 1977, in praise of the folk heroine Mulan.	
India	The Blue Tigresses		The colour blue, present on the Ashoka Chakra symbol on India's flag, as well as the Bengal tiger are national symbols of India.	
Indonesia	Garuda Pertiwi	Garuda of the Motherland	The name combines Garuda, the mythical bird featured on Indonesia's national emblem, with Pertiwi, referring to Ibu Pertiwi ("Mother Earth" or the personification of the Indonesian motherland).	
Iran	شیرزنان; Šīrzanān	Lionesses	The Persian name literally means lionesses.	
Japan	なでしこジャパン; Nadeshiko Japan (Note: Japanese pronunciation: [na̠de̞ɕi̥ko̞ dʑa̠pã̠ɴ])	Nadeshiko Japan	"Nadeshiko" is a floral metaphor, representing the characteristics of an ideal Japanese woman.	
Lebanon	صبايا الأرز; Sabāyā al-Arz	The Lady Cedars	The cedar is an important national symbol of Lebanon and appears on the country's flag.	
Philippines	Filipinas	Filipino women	Nickname officially adopted by the federation in March 2022 to replace Malditas.	
Philippines (former nickname)	Malditas	Feisty Ladies	The nickname was adopted in 2005 under the tutelage of coach Ernest Nierras. It is meant to reflect the team's gutsy and feisty nature. "Maldita" in Filipino slang could alternatively mean "bratty" hence coach Marlon Maro in 2021 proposed the discontinue the usage of the nickname.	
South Korea	태극 낭자; Taegeuk Nangja	Taegeuk Ladies	The Taegeuk is an important national symbol of South Korea.	
Thailand	ชบาแก้ว; Chaba Kaeo	Chaba Kaew	Referring to the female elephant character in Khan Kluay.	
Vietnam	Những Nữ Chiến Binh Sao Vàng	Golden Star Women Warriors	Derived from the "golden star" on Vietnam's flag.	

== See also ==
- List of national association football teams by nickname
