= List of CONMEBOL national association football teams by nickname =

The following is a list of nicknames of South American Football Confederation (CONMEBOL) national association football teams.

== Nicknames ==
- Nicknames in italics are commonly used in English.

Team	Nickname	English translation	Notes	Ref.
Argentina	La Albiceleste	The White and Sky-Blue	The Argentinian flag has 3 equal stripes, the white and blue stripe represent the sky clouds and the yellow sun in the middle.	
Bolivia	La Verde	The Green	In 1957, the Bolivian Football Federation decided to use one of the colors in the Flag of Bolivia. Given red and yellow were used by many of the other South American countries, green became the primary color, leading to the nickname "La Verde" ("The Green").	
Brazil	Canarinho	The Little Canary	In reference to the yellow shirt.	
Brazil	A Seleção	The Team	Seleção means national team in Portuguese.	
Brazil	Verde-Amarela	The Green and Yellow	The flag of Brazil also known in Portuguese as Verde e amarela ("The Green and Yellow").	
Chile	La Roja	The Red One	The Chile national football team wears Red Jerseys, Blue shorts and white socks. The color scheme of red, white, and blue has been in use since 1947.	
Chile	El equipo de todos	Everyone's team	The Chile national football team wears Red Jerseys, Blue shorts and white socks. The color scheme of red, white, and blue has been in use since 1947.	
Colombia	Los Cafeteros	The Coffee Growers	Colombian coffee is renowned around the world for its quality and delicious taste.	
Colombia	La Tricolor	The Tricolour	The national flag of Colombia symbolizes Colombian independence from Spain, gained on 20 July 1810. It is a horizontal tricolor of yellow, blue and red.	
Colombia	Las Chicas Superpoderosas (Women's)	The Powerpuff Girls	In reference to the popular Powerpuff Girls cartoon, in which super-powered little girls set out to save the world.	
Ecuador	La Tri / Tricolor	The Tricolour	The Flag of Ecuador has a horizontal tricolor of yellow blue and red with the National Coat of Arms superimposed at the center.	
Paraguay	La Albirroja	The White-Red	From the Paraguayan Flag which is white and red.	
Paraguay	Los Guaraníes	The Guaraní	From their ancestors. Many modern Paraguayans are descendants of the intermingling of the Spanish and Guarani.	
Peru	La Blanquirroja	The White-Red	From the Peruvian flag which is white and red.	
Uruguay	La Celeste (Olímpica)	The (Olympic) Sky Blue	From the Uruguay flag which has sky blue and white colors.	
Uruguay	Los Charrúas	The Charrúa	Indigenous people living in present-day Uruguay.	
Venezuela	La Vinotinto	The Burgundy	Because of the traditional burgundy color of their shirts.	
Venezuela	Los Llaneros	The Plainsmen	A llanero is a South American herder. The name is taken from the Llanos grasslands occupying western-central Venezuela.	
Venezuela	La Remolacha Mecanica	The Clockwork Beet	From the sugar beetroot.	

== See also ==
- List of national association football teams by nickname
