= List of OFC national association football teams by nickname =

The following is a list of nicknames of Oceania Football Confederation (OFC) national association football teams.

== Nicknames ==
- Nicknames in italics are commonly used in English.

Team	Nickname	English translation	Notes	Ref.
American Samoa	Au Fili	The National Team	Filifili means the "Chosen" or "Selected" in Samoan.	
Cook Islands	Te Kukis	The Cooks	The Flag of the Cook Islands from 1973 to 1979 was a predominantly green color representing the continuous growth and life of the islands	
Fiji	Bula Boys		"Bula" is a greeting used in Fijian.	
New Caledonia	Les Cagous	The Kagus	From a crested, almost flightless bluish-grey bird related to the rails, endemic to the island of New Caledonia.	
New Caledonia	Les Rouges et Gris	The Red and Grays	From a crested, almost flightless bluish-grey bird related to the rails, endemic to the island of New Caledonia.	
New Zealand	All Whites		New Zealand adopted an 'all white' playing strip during the 1982 World Cup qualifying campaign.	
New Zealand (Women's)	Football Ferns		The fern is one of the national symbols of New Zealand.	
Papua New Guinea	Kapuls	The Cuscus	A species of Australasian possum.	
Samoa	Manumea		After a native bird.	
Solomon Islands	The Bonitos		Tribe of fishes.	
Tahiti	Toa Aito Les guerriers de fer	Iron Warriors	Iron has been entwined in the Tahiti culture from the onset. When British Captain Samuel Wallis "discovered" Tahiti on 18 June 1767, the natives were eager to trade, especially in iron nails.	
Tonga	Timi Fakafomua	The National Team	The national football team of Tonga.	
Vanuatu	The Men in Black and Gold		From the Vanuatu flag which has Red and green sections, divided horizontally by a gold stripe running within a black border.	

== See also ==
- List of national association football teams by nickname
