= List of CONCACAF national association football teams by nickname =

The following is a list of nicknames of Confederation of North, Central America and Caribbean Association Football (CONCACAF) national association football teams.

== Nicknames ==
- Nicknames in italics are commonly used in English.

Team	Nickname	English translation	Notes	Ref.
Anguilla	The Rainbow Warriors		Set in the Caribbean sea and with St. Martin as a backdrop, Anguilla has one of the largest community of Dolphins in the world.	
Anguilla	The Soccer Dolphins		Set in the Caribbean sea and with St. Martin as a backdrop, Anguilla has one of the largest community of Dolphins in the world.	
Antigua and Barbuda	The Wadadi Boyz		Wadadi is a local dance.	
Aruba	Seleccion	Selection		
Bahamas	Rake & Scrape Boys		Rake-and-scrape is a genre of music native to the Bahamas.	
Barbados	Bajan Pride		Bajan is a popular term for citizens of Barbados.	
Bermuda	Gombey Warriors		The Gombey is an iconic symbol of Bermuda, a unique performance art full of colorful and intricate masquerade, dance and drumming.	
Belize	The Jaguars		Belize is home to one of the biggest Jaguar Populations. The Jaguar Reserve is the world's biggest and only Jaguar Preserve spanning 150 square miles.	
Bonaire	Caribbean warriors			
British Virgin Islands	Nature Boyz		The British Virgin Islands are a collection of 60 unspoiled islands that pack the best of the Caribbean. They are commonly referred to as nature's little secrets.	
Canada	Canucks		"Canuck" is a slang term for Canadian.	
Canada	Les Rouges	The Reds	From their Red uniforms.	
Cayman Islands	The Turtles		The sea turtle is a prominent symbol in Cayman culture. Turtles adorn Caymanian money and appear on the islands' flag as part of the official coat of arms.	
Costa Rica	Los Ticos	The Ticos	From the local linguistic habit of creating diminutives by adding "tico" instead of "tito" to the end of words.	
Costa Rica	La Sele	Shortening of "The Selection" (in Spanish)	Named after the most successful national football team in the history of Central America. Which won three CONCACAF Championships (1963, 1969 and 1989) and eight championships in the Copa Centroamericana and its predecessor.	
Costa Rica	Los Matacampeones	The Champion Killers	Named after the most successful national football team in the history of Central America. Which won three CONCACAF Championships (1963, 1969 and 1989) and eight championships in the Copa Centroamericana and its predecessor.	
Cuba	Los Leones del Caribe	The Caribbean Lions	Cuba is an island in the Caribbean and the Lion is one of the most ferocious animals on earth.	
Curaçao	The Blue Stars		The flag of Curaçao is blue, with a yellow horizontal stripe slightly below the midline, and two white stars in the upper left corner. The blue symbolizes the sea and sky, and the yellow represents the sun. The two stars are for Curaçao and Klein Curaçao, but also stand for 'Love and Happiness.'	
Dominica	Dominica Team		The imperial amazon or Dominican amazon, also known as the sisserou, is a parrot found only on the Caribbean island of Dominica. It has been designated as the national bird of Dominica.	
Dominica	Los Pericos	The Parrots	The imperial amazon or Dominican amazon, also known as the sisserou, is a parrot found only on the Caribbean island of Dominica. It has been designated as the national bird of Dominica.	
Dominican Republic	Los Quisqueyanos	The Quisqueyanos	Quisqueya is one of the names of Hispaniola Island otherwise known as the Dominican Republic. It is believed to mean "mother of all lands" in the Taíno language.	
El Salvador	La Selecta	The Selected	The Selected or chosen in Spanish.	
El Salvador	Los Cuscatlecos	The Cuscatlecos	The Selected or chosen in Spanish.	
French Guiana	Les Yana Dòkòs	The Yana Dòkòs		
Guatemala	Los Chapines	The Guatemalans	"Chapin" is a Spanish slang term to refer to Guatemalans.	
Guatemala	La Azul y Blanco	The Blue & White	From the Guatemalan flag which is a tri-band of white and Blue.	
Grenada	Spice Boyz		Grenada is known as the "Island of Spice".	
Guadeloupe	Les Gars de Guadeloupe	Guys of Guadeloupe		
Guadeloupe	Les Boug'Wada	Gwada Boys		
Guyana	Golden Jaguars		The jaguar is one of the largest carnivorous mammals in Central America and it is found in Guyana. The Guyanese Coat of Arms features two jaguars.	
Haiti	Les Grenadiers	The Soldiers	A grenadier is a specialized soldier whose specialty was throwing grenades.	
Haiti	Le Rouge et Bleu	The Red & Blue	From the Haitian Flag which is Red and Blue.	
Jamaica	Reggae Boyz		Reggae is a music genre that originated in Jamaica.	
Jamaica (Women's)	Reggae Girlz		Reggae is a music genre that originated in Jamaica.	
Honduras	Los Catrachos	The Catrachos	Catracho is a name for a male from Honduras.	
Honduras	La Bicolor	The Bi-color	From the Honduran Flag which is Blue and White.	
Honduras	La H	The H	The initial for Honduras.	
Martinique	Les Matinino	The Matatino	Tribute to the history of the island.	
Montserrat	Emerald Boys		Montserrat is nicknamed "The Emerald Isle of the Caribbean".	
Mexico	El Tri / Tricolor	From "Tricolor" (Tricolour)	From the Tri-colors of the Mexican Flag.	
Nicaragua	Los Albiazules	The Whites & Blues	From the Nicaraguan Flag which is white and blue.	
Nicaragua	Los Pinoleros	The Pinole Makers	"Pinolero" is slang for a citizen of Nicaragua.	
Panama	La Marea Roja	The Red Tide	The red tide is a phenomenon when a population of phytoplankton, a single-celled plant, grows very fast or "blooms" and accumulates	
Panama	Equipo Canalero	The Canal Team	In reference to the Panama Canal.	
Puerto Rico	El Huracán Azul	The Blue Hurricane	From a tropical cyclone which has strong winds, and a spiral arrangement of thunderstorms that produce heavy rain common in the Island.	
Saint Kitts and Nevis	Sugar Boys		The economy of Saint Kitts and Nevis has traditionally depended on the growing and processing of sugar cane.	
Saint Lucia	The Piton		The Pitons are two mountainous volcanic plugs, volcanic spires, located in Saint Lucia.	
Saint Martin	Saint Swallows			
Saint Vincent and the Grenadines	Vincy Heat		Shortened nickname for the island of saint Vincent.	
Sint Maarten				
Suriname	De Natio	Short for "Nationale Selectie"	The National Selection.	
Suriname	Suriboys		From the Country name and shortened.	
Trinidad and Tobago	Soca Warriors		Soca is a music genre that originated in Trinidad and Tobago.	
Turks and Caicos Islands	TCI Team		TCI is the acronym of "Turks and Caicos Islands".	
United States	USMNT		Acronym of "United States Men's National Football Team".	
United States	Stars & Stripes		Reference to the American flag.	
United States	The Yanks		Slang term to refer to someone of American origin.	
United States (Women's)	USWNT		An acronym of "United States Women's National Football Team".	
United States (Women's)	Team USA		Team USA or United States national team may refer to any of a number of sports team representing the United States in international competitions.	
United States (Women's)	The Stars and Stripes		Reference to the American flag.	
U.S. Virgin Islands	The Dashing Eagle		The eagle is the national symbol of the U.S. Virgin Islands.	

== See also ==
- List of national association football teams by nickname
