= List of non-FIFA and former national association football teams by nickname =

The following is a list of nicknames of non-FIFA and former national association football teams.

== Nicknames ==
=== Non-FIFA teams ===
==== ConIFA teams ====
- Nicknames in italics are commonly used in English.

Team	Nickname	English translation	Notes	Ref.
Abkhazia	Горцы	The Highlanders	From the Greater Caucasus mountains in northwestern Georgia.	
Abkhazia	Кавказцы	Caucasians	From the Greater Caucasus mountains in northwestern Georgia.	
Artsakh	Խաչակիրներ	The Crusaders	From the volunteer detachment of the Armenians from the diaspora who volunteered to fight in the Artsakh conflict.	
Barawa	مدينة ﺑﺮﺍﻭة	The Barawanis		
Cascadia	The Dougies		The Doug, or Douglas fir, is one of the primary symbols of the Cascadia bioregion.	
Chagos Islands				
County of Nice	La Selecioun	The Selection		
Darfur	دارفور المتحدة; Darfur United			
Ellan Vannin	Ellan Vannin	Isle of Man		
Felvidék				
Franconia	Franken-Elf	Franken Eleven		
Greenland	Polar-Bamserne	The Polar Teddy Bears	Referencing the polar bears that live within Greenland.	
Kurdistan Region		The Tricolour Team	The Kurdistan region's flag is a tricolour of green, red and white.	
Kabylie				
Kárpátalja	kaːrpaːtɒjjɒ			
Kiribati				
Lazistan				
Matabeleland	Ingqungqulu	The Warrior Birds	The Matabeleland region is a renowned birding destination, home to over 400 species.	
Monaco				
Northern Cyprus	Kuzey Kıbrıs Millî Futbol Takımı			
Occitania	La Seleccion	The Selection		
Padania	I Rossocrociati	The Red Crosses	The Saint George's cross has been used extensively as a symbol of Northern Italy. It was also included in the previous version of the flag of Padania.	
Panjab				
Quebec	Les Québécois	The Québécois		
Raetia	Die Bündner	The Grisons		
Romani people	I Rom	The Gypsies	Romanis are referred to as "gypsies".	
Sápmi	Lapps	Laplanders		
Sardinia	Sa Natzionale	The National Team		
Sicily	A naziunali siciliana (Note: Sicilian pronunciation: [a nɑttsjuˈnaːlɪ sɪçɪljaːnɑ])	The Sicilian National Team		
Skåneland	Skånelandene	The Scanians		
Somaliland				
South Ossetia				
Székely Land				
Tamil Eelam	Tamil Tigers		Possibly a reference to the Liberation Tigers of Tamil Eelam, who fought for the region's independence from Sri Lanka.	
Tibet	禁断の集団	The Forbiddens	Named after the Danish documentary on the team, called The Forbidden Team.	
Transnistria				
Tuvalu				
United Koreans in Japan	FC Korea			
Western Armenia		The Highlanders		
Western Sahara	الإبل; Los Dromedarios	The Dromedaries	Dromedary is the official name of the one-humped camel, which are revered as the primary transport in the Sahara.	
Yorkshire	The Vikings		The Vikings are major historical influencers of Yorkshire culture including dialect words and aspects of pronunciation derive from old Norse.	
Zanzibar	Zanzibar Heroes			
Zanzibar	The Leopards		Named after the extirpated Zanzibar leopard.	

==== Other non-FIFA teams ====
- Nicknames in italics are commonly used in English.

Team	Nickname	English translation	Notes	Ref.
Basque Country	Euskal Selekzioa	The Basque Team		
Bonaire				
Brittany	An Du Diaouloù (Breton); Les Diables Noirs (French)	The Black Devils	Shared nickname with the club US Saint-Malo, which is also based in Brittany. Refers to the colour of the flag and the region's folklore being tied to the Devil and dark entities, including Mourioche.	
Catalonia	La Selecció	The Selection		
Catalonia	La Quatribarrada	The Four-barred	In reference to the four red horizontal bands on the flag of Catalonia.	
Catalonia	La Segadora	The Reaper	Els Segadors is the official anthem of Catalonia.	
French Guiana	Les Yana Dòkòs	The Yana Dòkòs		
Federated States of Micronesia	The Four Stars		In reference to the stars on the flag of the F.S. of Micronesia.	
Great Britain	Team GB			
Guadeloupe	Les Gars de Guadeloupe	Guys of Guadeloupe		
Guadeloupe	Les Boug'Wada	Gwada Boys		
Martinique	Les Matinino	The Matatino	Tribute to the history of the island.	
Nauru				
Niue				
Northern Mariana Islands	The Blue Ayuyus		Ayuyu is the name given to the Coconut crab.	
Palau				
Réunion	Club R		In reference to the initial for Réunion.	
Republika Srpska	Бијели орлови Bijeli orlovi	The White Eagles		
Saint Martin	Saint Swallows			
Sint Maarten				
Vatican City				

=== Former teams ===
- Translations in italics indicate nicknames also used in English.

Team	Nickname	English translation	Notes	Ref.
CIS				
Czechoslovakia				
East Germany	Weltmeister der Freundschaftsspiele	World Champion of Friendlies	Dubbed by Fritz Wutke, recalling the 3–3 draw in a friendly match against Brazil in the Maracanã Stadium coming from a three-goal deficit.	
Ireland				
Mandatory Palestine	Eretz Israel	Land of Israel		
Netherlands Antilles	De Antilopen	The Antelopes		
Saar				
Serbia and Montenegro	Plavi Плави	The Blues		
South Vietnam	Rồng Vàng	Golden Dragons		
South Yemen	صقور الجنوب	Falcons of the South		
Soviet Union	Красная Армия	Red Army		
Yugoslavia	Plavi	The Blues		
Zaire	Les Léopards	The Leopards		

== See also ==
- List of national association football teams by nickname
