= Lafaek Diak =

Creation myth of Timor

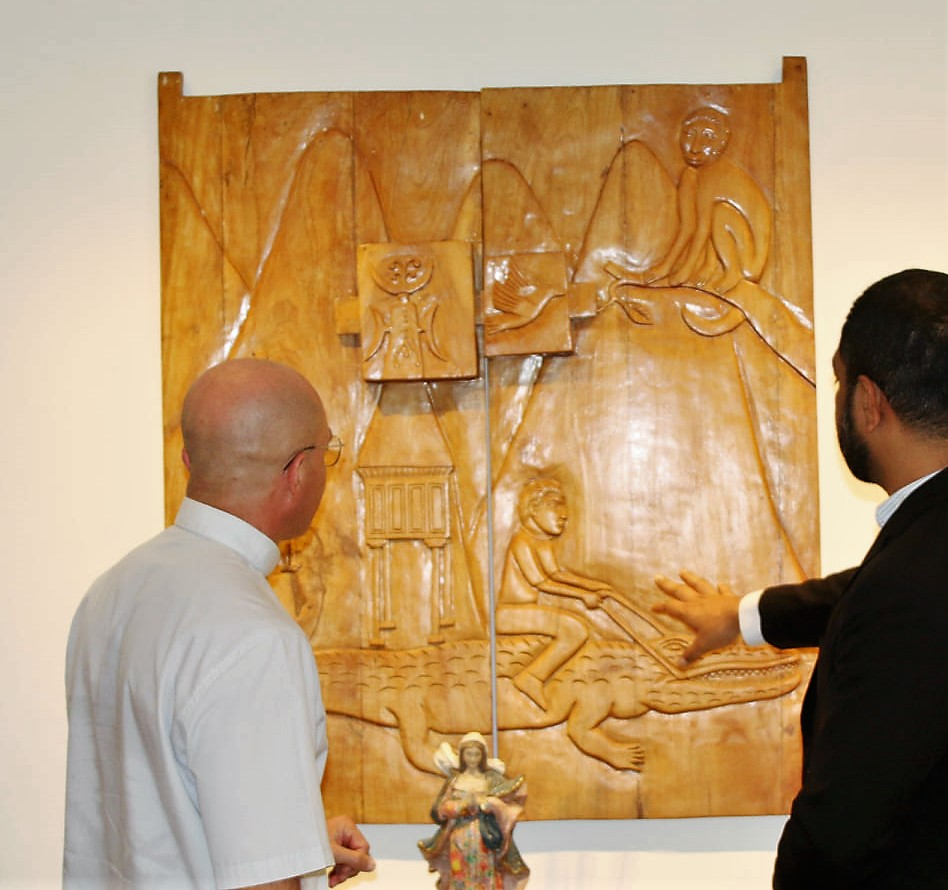
Presentation of the legend at the seat of the nuncio in East Timor

Lafaek Diak (translated as "The Good Crocodile") is the indigenous creation myth of the island of Timor, often referred to as the "Land of the Sleeping Crocodile" due to the island's shape resembling a crocodile.

== Story ==
According to the myth, one day, a young boy discovered a baby crocodile struggling to move from a lagoon to the sea. Because it was very weak, the boy took the little crocodile and carried it to the sea. The crocodile was very grateful and promised to return the favour. It told the boy that it wanted to go travelling with him. The boy should come to the sea, call it and the crocodile would help him. After a while, the boy remembered the crocodile's promise and went to the seashore, calling the crocodile three times. When the crocodile appeared, they were both very happy to see each other again. The crocodile told the boy to sit on his back, and the crocodile carried the boy on many, many journeys for many years.

Despite their companionship, the crocodile still remained a crocodile in nature. The crocodile felt an innate instinct and urge to eat the boy. Troubled by this impulse, the crocodile sought advice from various animals, including the whale, tiger, and water buffalo. All advised: ‘The boy was nice to you, you can't eat him.’ Eventually, the crocodile sought the counsel of a wise monkey, who cursed the crocodile upon hearing the story and then disappeared. Ashamed, the crocodile resolved not to harm the boy. Instead, he took the boy back on his back and they travelled together until the crocodile grew very old.

As the crocodile grew old, it realized it could never fully repay the boy's kindness. Before dying, the crocodile told the boy that its body would transform into a new land for the boy and his descendants. True to its word, the crocodile's body became the island of Timor, which retains the shape of a crocodile to this day. Thus the boy had many descendants, who would inherited his goodness, kindness and sense of justice.

== Zoological background ==
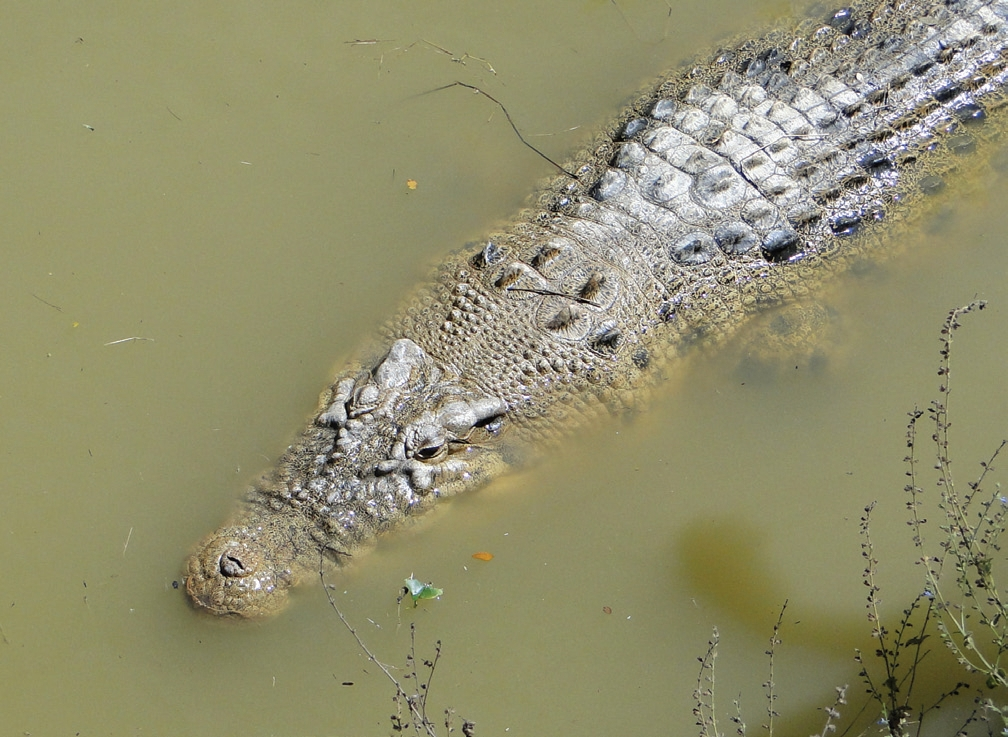
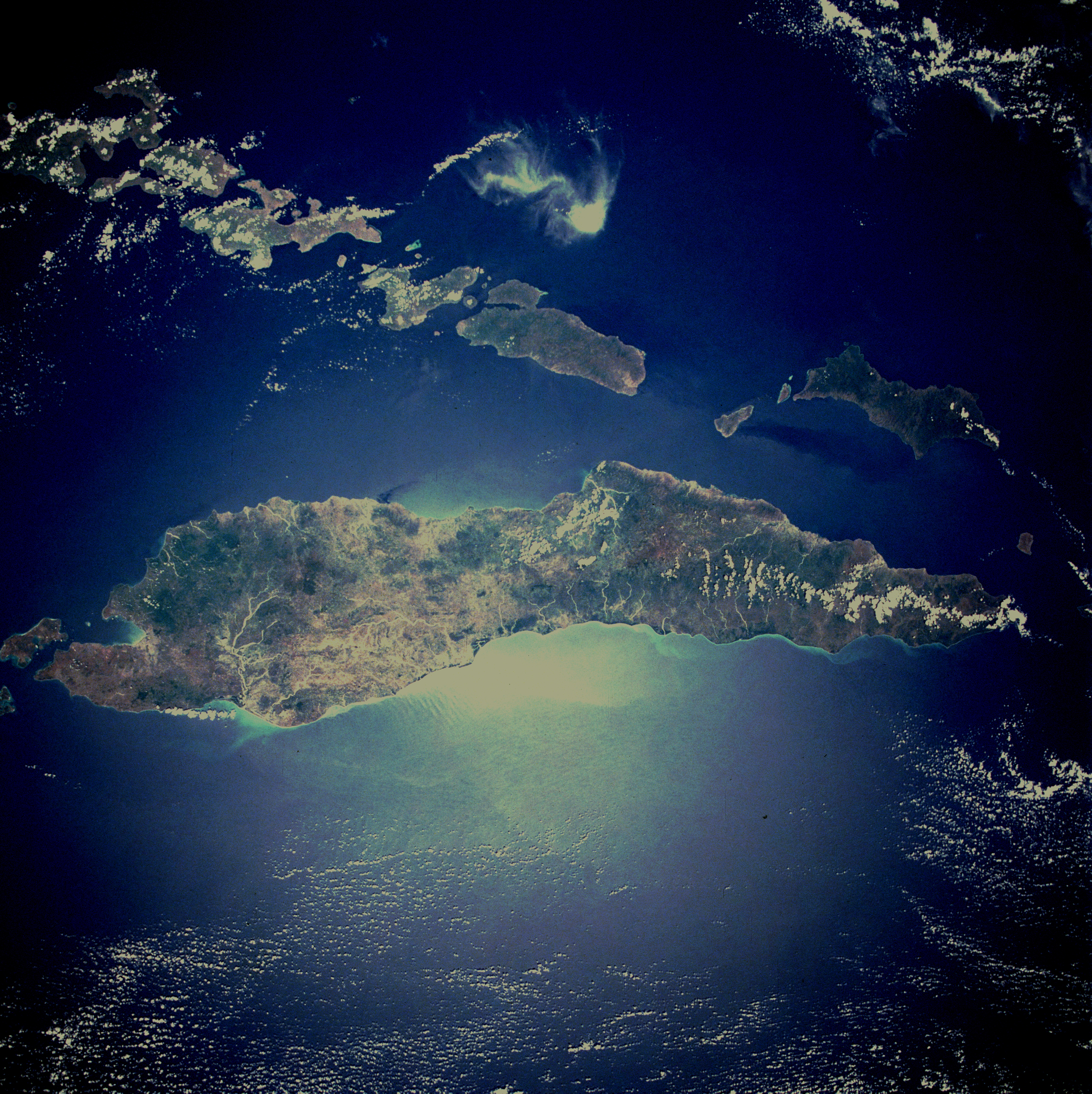
The Saltwater crocodile, the mythical origin of Timor, compared with the satellite image of Timor. The crocodile's head is in the east (right).

The inguinal saltwater crocodile (Crocodylus porosus) is the largest predator inhabiting the coasts, rivers, and lakes of Timor. It is the only crocodile species capable of living in both saltwater and freshwater environments and is native to the entire Southeast Asian archipelago, ranging from the eastern coast of India to the northern coast of Australia. In East Timor, a population of approximately 300 saltwater crocodiles resides in isolation at Ira Lalaro, the country's largest lake, and its connected rivers. These crocodiles exclusively inhabit freshwater environments, located about nine kilometers inland from the sea. They are geographically separated from the coast by the Paitchau mountain range, preventing contact with the ocean or other populations of their species.

== Crocodile in East Timor ==
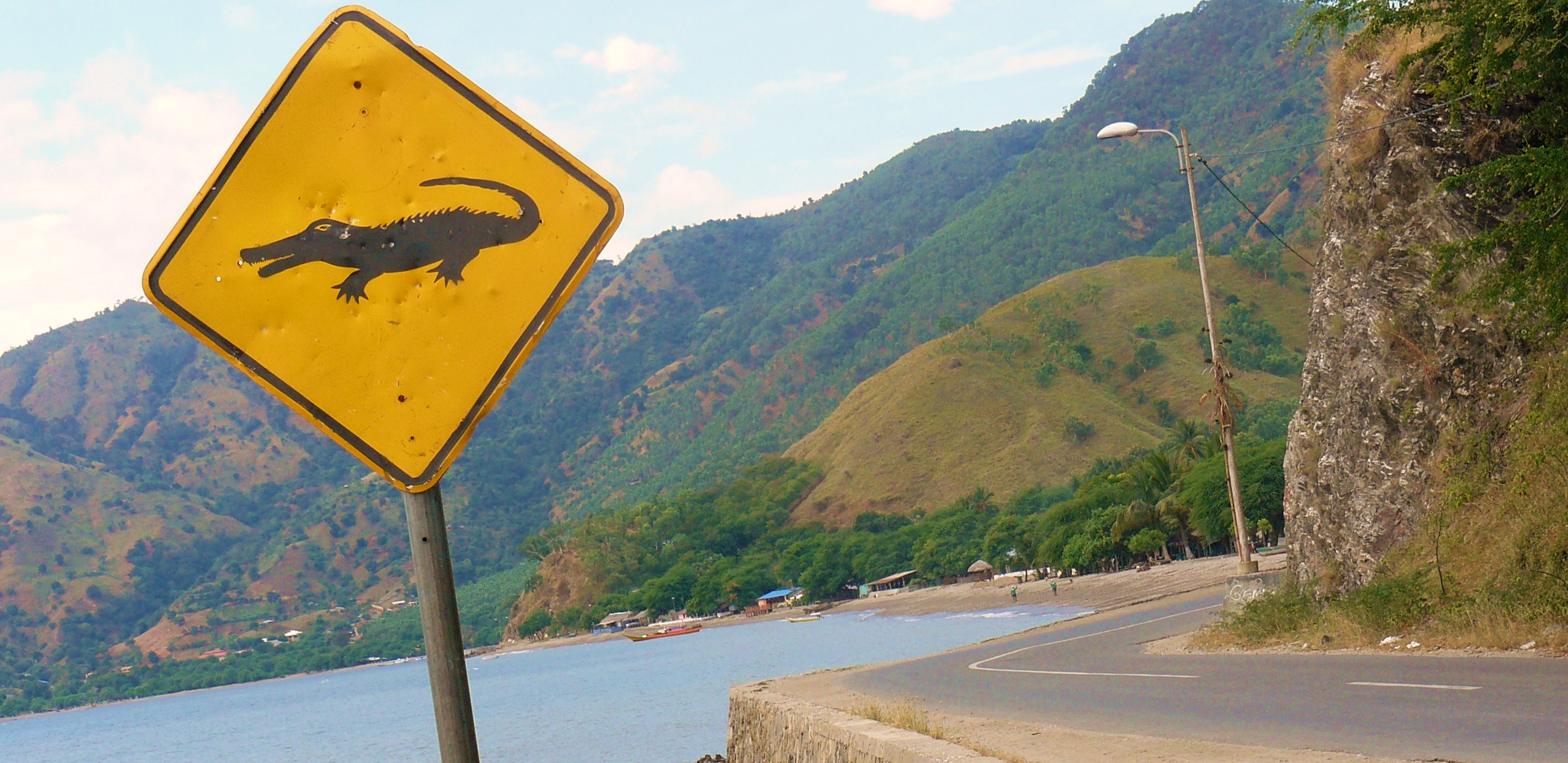
Crocodile sign in Dili

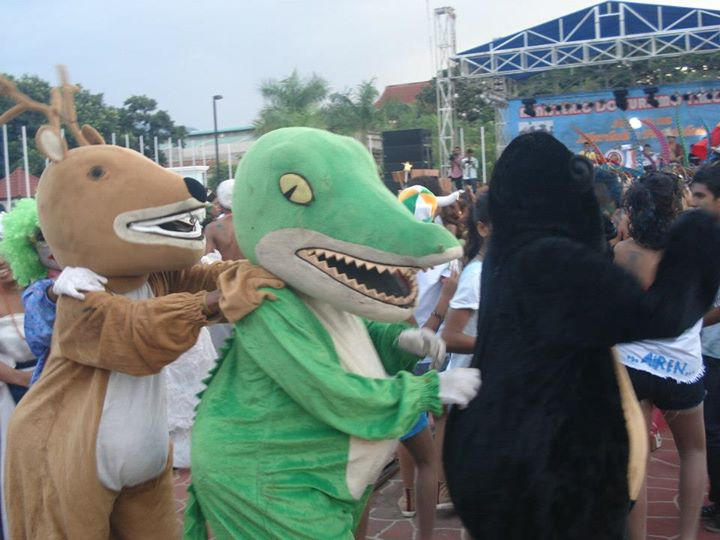
Crocodile dances at the carnival (2013)

The crocodile is a national symbol of East Timor. While it was still hunted during the Portuguese colonial period (until 1975) and Indonesian occupation (1975-1999), it has been protected in independent East Timor since 2002. It appears in a wide variety of forms in everyday life, for example in logos and brands, comic figures, graffiti or as a regular costume at the Dili Carnival.

The protection of the inguinal crocodile has led to an increase in the population and an increase in crocodile attacks on humans and pets. CrocBITE, the database for crocodile attacks at Charles Darwin University, has recorded 61 fatal and 24 other attacks on humans in East Timor since 2007 (as of 25 May 2020). However, the numbers could be even higher, as various communities consider the death of a relative by a crocodile to be a mark of shame. A crocodile attack is seen as a punishment from the ancestors, which is why many families do not officially report their victims. According to press reports, it is not possible to swim at several beaches due to the crocodile threat.

On 2 December 2015, a crocodile even swam to the shore in the state capital of Dili, directly below the government palace. A large crowd gathered to marvel at the crocodile. The Public Order Battalion (Batalhão de Ordem Pública; BOP) of the National Police of East Timor (PNTL) keeps three crocodiles named ‘Aminu’ (bodyguard, three and a half metres long), ‘Sparro’ (sword) and ‘Rama’ (beret) at its main base in Bairro Pite. The BOP has named three special units after its mascots. The East Timor Defence Forces also keep crocodiles at their bases.

In 2010, a Crocodile Task Force of ten men was established. East Timor received support from the Australian Northern Territory, which has long experience in dealing with inguinal crocodiles. Captured crocodiles were to be housed in a park in Hera. However, traditional leaders opposed the plan. They argued that if crocodiles and the environment were treated with respect, there would be no attacks. Local anthropologist Josh Trindade, who advised the task force, explained that in each individual case involving the removal of a crocodile from its environment, the situation had to be considered and local beliefs taken into account. The task force taught people in rural areas how to recognise crocodile hunting grounds and how to handle the animals. However, the unit had to cease its work after budget cuts.

Coat of arms of East Timor (UNTAET)

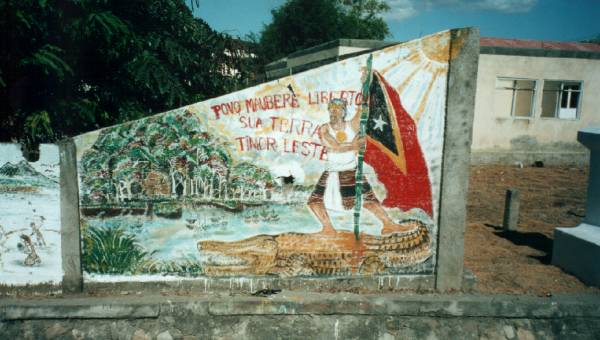
Mural in Manatuto

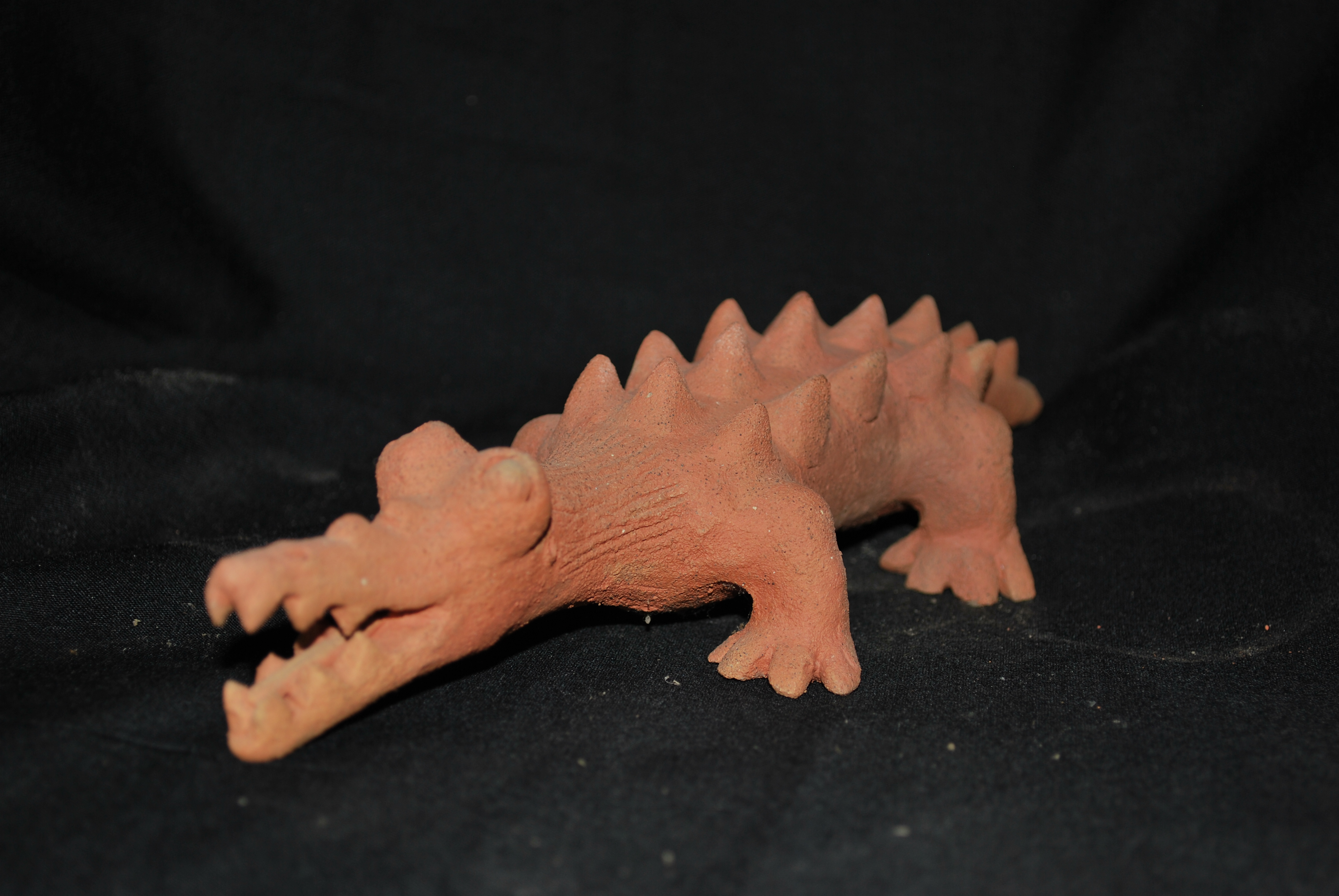
Pottery in Manatuto

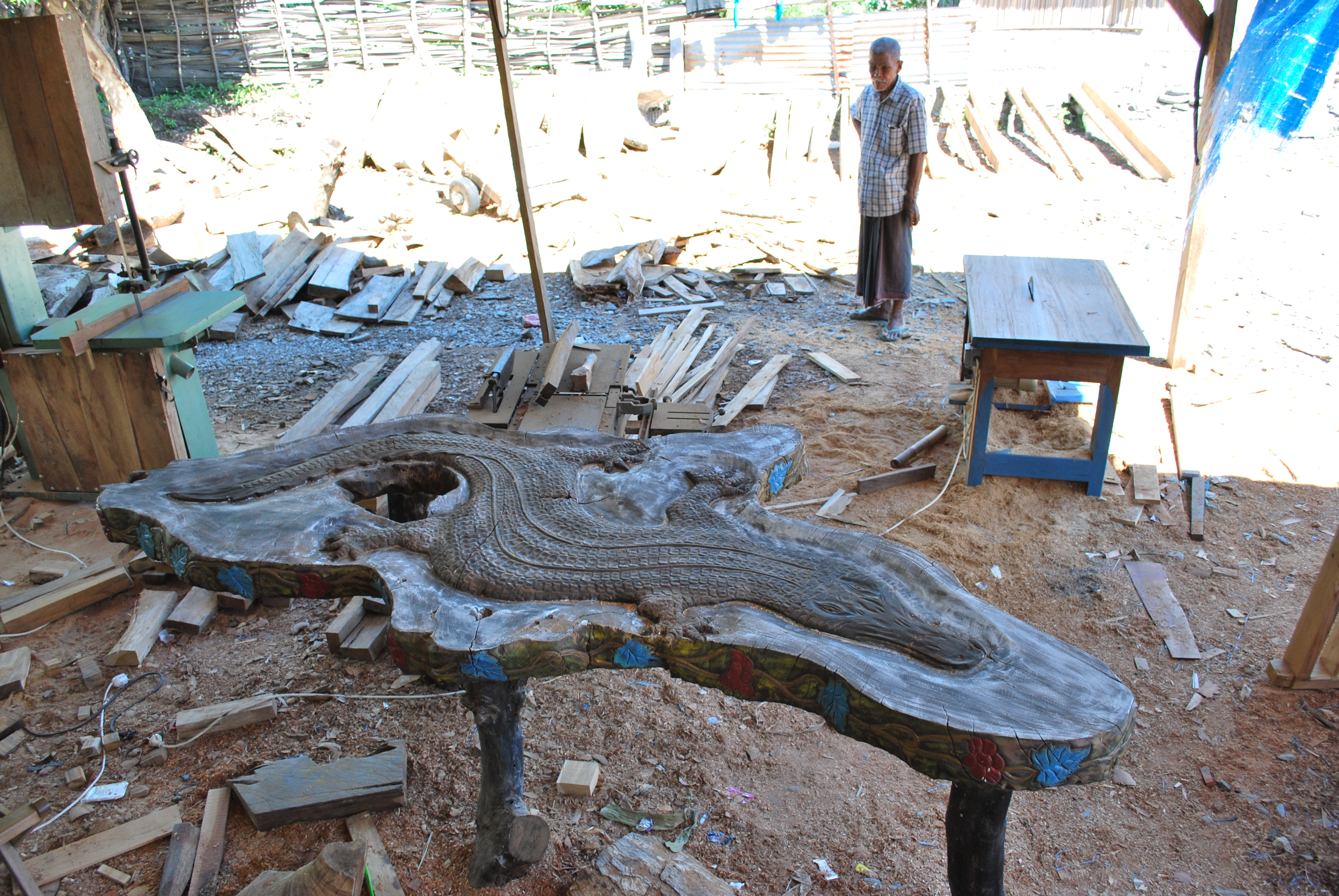
Woodwork in Maubara

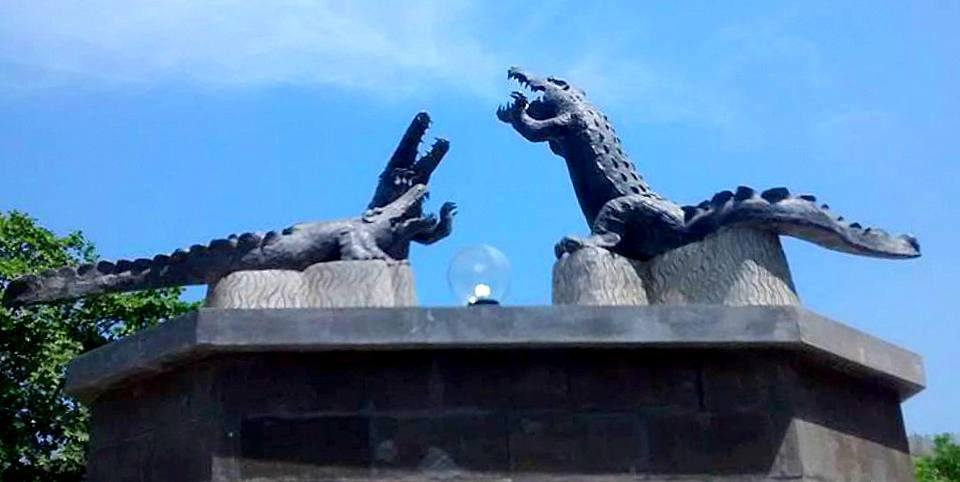
Statues at Areia Branca

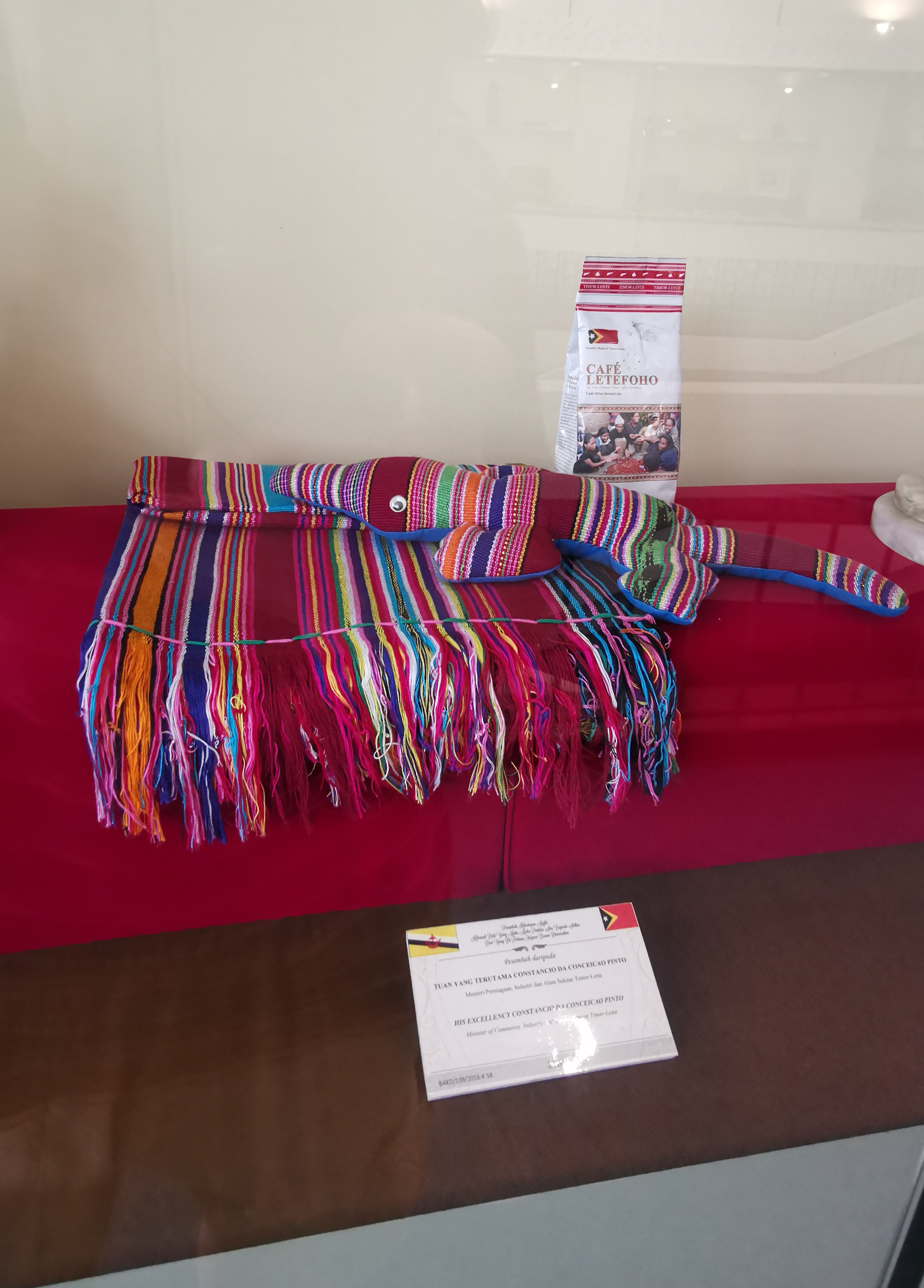
Crocodile plushy given as a gift to the Sultan of Brunei

== Symbolism ==
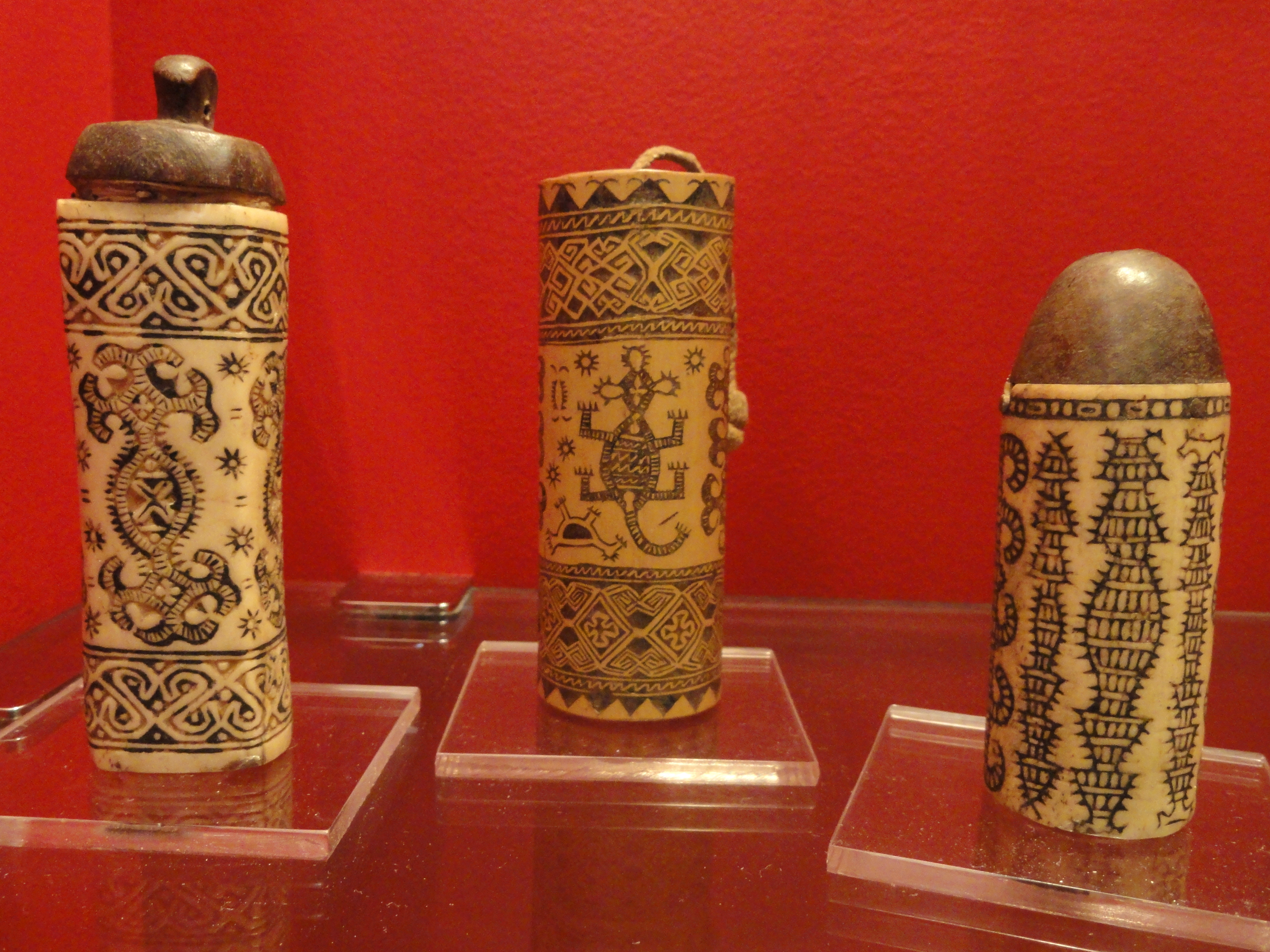
The middle betel nut container shows a stylised depiction of a crocodile (early 20th century)

For most of Timor's ethnic groups, the crocodile is considered sacred (lulik). The crocodile is affectionately referred to as "Grandfather" (Abo Lafaek), and when crossing rivers, locals often call out, "Crocodile, I am your grandson—don't eat me!" Among the Fataluku people, the east is called the "head of the land" (mua cao), and the west is referred to as the "tail of the land" (mua ulafuka), complementing their terms for sunrise (vacu hia sukana) and sunset (vacu isinu).

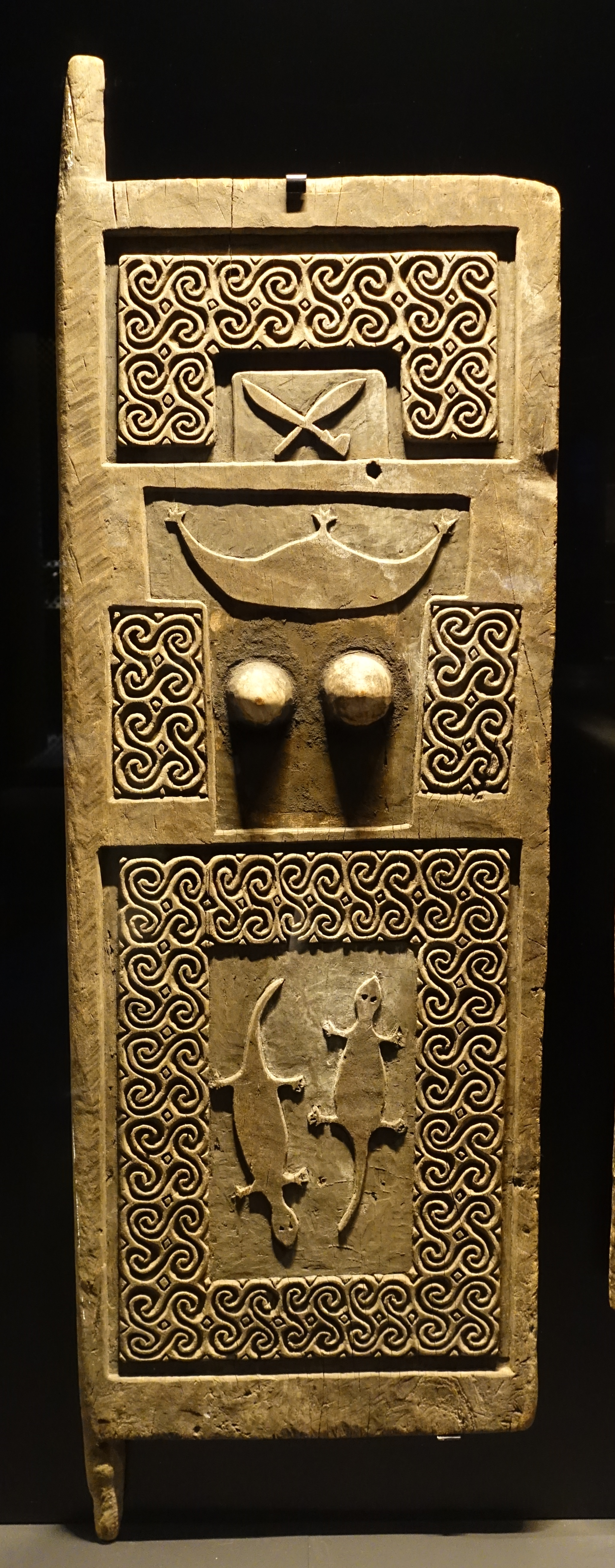
Rosewood carved door with crocodile symbols from Bobonaro (around 1900)

The crocodile is a prominent symbol in Timorese culture, frequently appearing in traditional handicrafts, artworks, and carvings within sacred houses (Tetum: Uma Lulik; Fataluku: lee teinu). Traditional depictions, from a European perspective, may resemble lizards. Xanana Gusmão, a politician and writer, celebrated this cultural icon in his poem, Grandfather Crocodile.

Crocodiles also serve as metaphors in Timorese narratives. For instance, during the Indonesian occupation, the exodus of Timorese refugees was described as "Leaving the crocodile." Legends and traditions involving crocodiles vary across regions. In some areas, crocodiles are kept as pets, while in others, they are revered as sacred warnings to maintain distance. Certain events are culturally explained through crocodile myths. On the south coast of Timor, if a young girl is abducted by a crocodile while crossing a river, it is said to signify the cleansing of village sins through her death. In Lago Malai, Bobonaro, specific interpretations are attached to crocodile attacks. If a woman is killed, it is believed that the crocodiles were enamored with her and sought her as a bride. Conversely, men who fall victim are thought to have been punished for pride or arrogance.

In West Timor's Kupang region, historical rulers considered themselves descendants of crocodiles. Public sacrifices were performed to honor crocodiles during the enthronement of new rulers. The ritual involved a pig with red bristles and a young girl, who was dressed festively, perfumed, and adorned with flowers. The girl was tied to a sacred stone in a cave, and crocodiles summoned by the ruler's guard were believed to claim her as their bride. It was thought that if the girl was not a virgin, the crocodiles would reject her and return her body. Other ceremonies included consecrating newborn girls to the crocodiles, who would later be symbolically married to a priest.
