= List of UEFA national association football teams by nickname =

List of nicknames of UEFA inter national association football teams

The following is a list of nicknames of Union of European Football Associations (UEFA) national association football teams.

== Nicknames ==
- Nicknames in italics are commonly used in English.

Team	Nickname	English translation	Notes	Ref.
Albania	Kuqezinjtë	The Red and Blacks	Depicts the colours of the flag of Albania.	
Albania	Shqiponjat / Shqipet	The Eagles	The eagle is one of the national symbols of Albania. The crossed hands gesture, which symbolizes an eagle, is sometimes used as a celebration by Albanian players.	
Andorra	La Seleccio Tricolor	The Tricolour Selection	The flag of Andorra is a vertical tricolour of blue, yellow, and red with the country's coat of arms.	
Armenia	Հավաքական	The Collective Team	From the Armenia national football team.	
Austria	Wunderteam	Wonder Team	In the 1930s led by Manager Hugo Meisl, the team earned the Nickname after a 14 matches undefeated run.	
Azerbaijan	Milli Komanda	The National Team		
Belarus	Белыя Крылы	The White Wings	In August 2016, the Football Federation of Belarus announced that the team's nickname would be the "White Wings". The name was influenced by the book The Land Beneath White Wings (1977) by famous Belarusian writer Uladzimir Karatkievich.	
Belgium	De Rode Duivels; Les Diables Rouges (Note: French pronunciation: [le djabl ʁuʒ]); Die Roten Teufel	The Red Devils	In 1906, the Belgium national team players received the nickname Red Devils because of their red jersey.	
Belgium (Women)	The Red Flames			
Bosnia and Herzegovina	Zmajevi	The Dragons	Popularized by football TV commentator Marjan Mijajlović during Belgium vs. Bosnia 2010 World Cup qualification game on 28 March 2009. A historical allusion to general Husein Gradaščević, who fought for independence, and was known as the "Dragon of Bosnia".	
Bosnia and Herzegovina	Zlatni Ljiljani	The Golden Lilies	Sometimes referred to as the Golden Lilies, which was an original nickname given to all the country's teams and sportsmen or Women by fans after independence in reference to official state insignia at the time (flag and coat of arms).	
Bulgaria	Лъвовете	The Lions	The coat of arms of Bulgaria consists of a crowned golden lion rampant over a dark red shield. The Lion is the national animal of Bulgaria.	
Croatia	Vatreni	The Fiery Ones	Vatra means Fire in Croatian.	
Croatia	Kockasti	The Chequered Ones	The Croatian checkerboard is the national symbol of Croatia.	
Cyprus	Η γαλανόλευκη	The White and Blues	The Naval Jack of Cyprus is blue with a white cross.	
Czech Republic	Nároďák	The National Team	Narod translates to the people in English	
Czech Republic	Lokomotiva	The Locomotive	The Czech Republic is one of the world biggest Locomotive builders led by Škoda.	
Denmark	The Danish Dynamite		Mainly relating to the Danish team of the 1980s.	
Denmark	De Rød-Hvide	The Red-Whites	From the Danish flag which is red and white.	
England	The Three Lions (Note: UK: /ðiː θɹiː lɑɪənz/)		The three lions symbol was first recorded in 1198 when a red crest with three gold lions was used as a coat of arms by Richard I.	
England (Women)	The Lionesses (Note: UK: /ðiː 'lɑɪənzəsəz/)		The three lions symbol was first recorded in 1198 when a red crest with three gold lions was used as a coat of arms by Richard I.	
Estonia	Sinisärgid	The Blue shirts	From their home kit which traditionally consists of a blue shirt.	
Faroe Islands	Landsliðið	The National Team	Landsliðið means National Team in Faroese.	
Finland	Huuhkajat	The Eagle Owls	Huuhkajat means Owls in Finnish.	
Finland (Women)	Helmarit	The Pearl Owls	Huuhkajat means Owls in Finnish.	
France	Les Bleus (Note: French pronunciation: [le blø])	The Blues	Because of the traditional color of their uniforms which is blue.	
Georgia	ჯვაროსნები	The Crusaders	Legend tells of Crusaders who left France 800 years ago and became detached from the main army, marched through Turkey and Armenia and settled in the Greater Caucasus mountains in Georgia.	
Germany	DFB-Team	DFB Team		
Germany	Die Nationalelf	The National Eleven		
Germany	DFB-Elf	DFB Eleven		
Gibraltar	Team 54		Gibraltar was the 54th nation to join UEFA.	
Greece	Η Εθνική	The National Team	Η Εθνική (Ethnikí) means the National team in Greek.	
Greece	Το Πειρατικό	The Pirate Ship	Unofficial nickname given after the Euro 2004 win.	
Hungary	Nemzeti Tizenegy	National Eleven	From the teams starting 11 players.	
Iceland	Strákarnir okkar	Our Boys	Strákarnir okkar means our boys in Icelandic.	
Israel	הכחולים-לבנים	The Skyblue and Whites (HaTkhulim-Levanim)	From the Hebrew words for the original colors of the Flag of Israel (as well as the colors of the capital city of Israel's emblem as depicted in the Coat of Arms of Jerusalem), which is two skyblue horizontal stripes framing a skyblue Star of David on top of white background.	
Israel	הנבחרת	The Chosen Team (HaNivcheret)	From the shortened Modern Hebrew term used primarily for the selected national sportspeople, combined with the biblical Hebrew term of the Chosen people that alludes to the Jews and the Israelites.	
Italy	La Nazionale (Note: Italian pronunciation: [la nattsjoˈnaːle])	The National Team	From the Italian National Team.	
Italy	Gli Azzurri	The Blues	The colour blue originates from the House of Savoy coat of arms, which had a blue background.	
Italy (Women)	Le Azzurre (Note: Italian pronunciation: [le adˈdzurre])	The Blues (female)	The colour blue originates from the House of Savoy coat of arms, which had a blue background.	
Kazakhstan	Казахстанские барсы	The Kazakh Leopards (Kazakhstanskiye Barsi)	Refers to the snow leopard, one of the rarest animals in Kazakhstan and a symbol of the Kazakh people.	
Kosovo	Dardanët	The Dardanians	The Dardani was an Indo-European tribe that settled in the region of present-day Kosovo.	
Latvia	11 vilki	11 wolves	From the teams starting 11 players.	
Liechtenstein	Nati	Short for "National".	From "Nationalmannschaft", the German for "National team".	
Lithuania	Rinktinė	The National Team	Rinktinė means national team in Lithuanian.	
Luxembourg	d'Roud Léiwen	The Red Lions	d'Roud Léiwen means red lions in Luxembourgish.	
Malta	Knights of St. John		The Order of the Knights of St John was a Catholic Military Order established in 603	
Moldova	Selectionata	The Selection	From the chosen ones or the chosen	
Montenegro	Hrabri Sokoli	The Brave Falcons	From the Falco vespertinus which are native to Montenegro.	
Netherlands	Oranje	Orange	Orange is the colour of the Dutch royal family.	
Netherlands	Clockwork Orange		Nickname of the 1970s the Dutch team, famous for its precision passing.	
Netherlands	The Flying Dutchmen		Wordplay associated with the legendary ship the Flying Dutchman	
Netherlands (Women)	Oranjeleeuwinnen	Orange Lionesses	The Lion is one of the national symbols of the Netherlands, orange is its national color.	
North Macedonia	Црвени Рисови	The Red Lynx	The Balkan lynx is a national symbol.	
North Macedonia	Црвено-Жолти	The Red-Yellow	From the Macedonian flag which is red and yellow.	
Northern Ireland	Norn Iron		Slang term for "Northern Ireland".	
Norway	Drillos		Used during the tenure of Egil "Drillo" Olsen.	
Poland	Biało-czerwoni	The White and Reds	From the polish flag which is white and Red.	
Poland	Orły	The Eagles	From the polish coat of arms which depicts white crowned eagle on red field.	
Portugal	Seleção das Quinas	Team of the quinas	From the group of 5 shields and the 5 groups of 5 bezants present in the Coat of arms of Portugal, known in Portuguese as "Quinas".	
Republic of Ireland	Na Buachaillí i nGlas	The Boys in Green	The green in Ireland's tricolor flag is meant to represent Ireland's Catholic heritage and nationalism.	
Romania	Tricolorii	The Tricolours	From the Romanian flag that has three colors.	
Russia	Наши парни Сборная	Our Guys; The National Team	Сборная means national team in Russian.	
San Marino	La Serenissima (Note: Italian pronunciation: [la ˌsereˈnissima])	The Most Serene	The Republic of San Marino is unofficially as the Most Serene Republic of San Marino.	
Scotland	The Tartan Terriers		Refers to Scottish Terriers amongst other Scottish dog breeds.	
Serbia	Бели Орлови	White Eagles	From the Serbian double-headed heraldic eagle, a common symbol in the nation's heraldry and vexillology	
Slovakia	Repre	Short for "Národná reprezentácia" (The National Team)	From the Slovak national team meaning.	
Slovakia	Národný tím	National Team	From the Slovak national team meaning.	
Slovakia	Bojovní Jondovci	The Fighting Jondas	From the Slovak word meaning warrior.	
Slovakia	Sokolíci	The Falcons	The falcon is the unofficial Slovak national animal.	
Slovenia	Zmajčeki	The Dragons	A dragon is a large, serpent-like legendary creature that appears in the folklore of many cultures around the world. There is also a myth that the Ljubljana Dragon protects the capital city, Ljubljana.	
Spain	La Roja (Note: Spanish pronunciation: [la ˈroxa])	The Red One	"La Furia Roja (Note: Spanish pronunciation: [la ˈfuɾja ˈroxa])", means the Red Fury in Spanish.	
Sweden	Blågult	The Blue-Yellow	From the Swedish flag which is Blue and Yellow	
Switzerland	Nati	Short for "Nationalmannschaft" (The National Team)	From Nationalmannschaft which means National team in German.	
Turkey	Ay Yıldızlılar	The Crescent-Stars	The crescent and the star, present on the flag, are the national symbols of Turkey.	
Ukraine	Синьо-жовті	The Blue and Yellows	From the flag of Ukraine.	
Wales	Y Dreigiau	The Dragons	The Welsh Dragon is the national symbol of Wales.	

== See also ==
- Glossary of association football terms
- List of men's national association football teams
- List of women's national association football teams
